= Aishath Maain Rasheed =

Maldivian singer

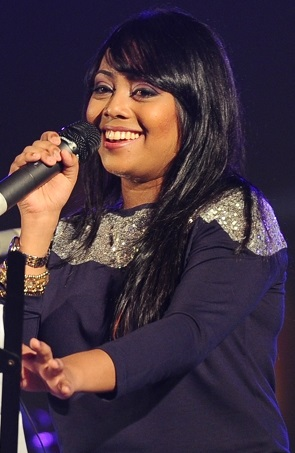
- Maain at "Minivan 50, Sarindha" music show, 2015
- Born: 2 November 1992 (age 33); Thiruvananthapuram, India
- Occupation: Playback singer
- Years active: 2009–present
- Spouse: Ibrahim Shifaz (m. 2015)
- Musical career
- Genres: Pop; filmi; electronic
- Instrument: Vocals

Aishath Maain Rasheed (2 November 1992) is a Maldivian singer.

== Early life ==
At the age of seven, Maain's interest in music grew as she observes her father, Ibrahim Rasheed, working as a mentor to the students of MES Malé English School, participating in Television Maldives Interschool Singing Competition. In 2000, she presented her first stage performance while studying in Jamaluddin school where she was ranked third in her age category. The following year, she received the first place from her age category and second place in Junior Age Group. Ever since, till 2008, she was placed in the top five of the competition.

In 2008, during her last year of secondary education, Maain participated in the National Centre for the Arts Interschool Singing Competition and won several awards including, best performer in her age category, best performer in senior age group and best performer of the competition. She then auditioned for the Maldivian edition of Voice of India, in which she was selected to perform alongside Abbas, an Indian singer. However, citing the tragic death of Voice of India title holder, Ishmeet Singh, she lost her chance at international exposure.

== Career ==
In 2009, Maain was offered to feature in the singing show Ehandhaanugai Duet alongside Hussain Shiham, where they performed the a recreated version of the retro song "Kuri Khiyaal Hithuge Noora". Their performance and the song was positively received by the audience where it was placed in the top ten performances of the show. She then auditioned for a local television singing show, Maldivian Icon where she got selected as the runner-up from the competition, which resulted in her receiving several offers from music directors and producers. The same year, she made her career debut with the romantic song "Loabin Thi Hiyy Hiba Kohfinama" from the film Udhabaani which fetched her a nomination as the Best Female Playback Singer at 1st Maldives Film Awards ceremony. She next contributed to the soundtrack album of the films Jinni (2010), Fanaa (2010) and Niuma (2010), where her soft rendition of the song "Hiyy Dhevijje Kalaayah Huvaa" from the latter fetched her first nomination as the Best Female Playback Singer at the 6th Gaumee Film Awards ceremony. The success was continued with her second nomination as the Best Female Singer at the 7th Gaumee Film Awards ceremony, for the title song of Hiyy Yaara Dheefa (2011).

Maain is mainly known for her slow-paced romantic songs and the classical influence in her rendition with her higher octave vocals. However, in her career she has tried other genres of songs including hip-hop with the song "Bunelaa Loabivey", while experimenting with her lower vocal ranges in songs like "Ishqun Masthey Vanee". On 4 April 2015, Maain married a local musician, Ibrahim Shifaz. In the media she is lauded for her courage to pursue a professional career in music despite her medical limitations as a thalassemia patient.

== Discography ==
=== Feature film ===
Year	Film	Song	Lyricist(s)	Co-Artist(s)
2009	Udhabaani	"Loabin Thi Hiyy Hiba Kohfinama"		Mohamed Farhad
2009	Loaiybahtakaa	"Loaiybahtakaa"	Adam Haleem Adnan	Ibrahim Zaid Ali
2010	Jinni	"Loabivaa"		Mohamed Abdul Ghanee
2010	Fanaa	"Yaaru Kairi"	Ahmed Nashidh (Dharavandhoo)	Mohamed Abdul Ghanee
2010	Niuma	"Hiyy Dhevijje Kalaayah Huvaa"	Adam Haleem Adnan	Ibrahim Zaid Ali
2011	E Bappa	"Moosun Mi Reethi Bahaarey"		Hassan Ilham
2011	E Bappa	"Keevvebaa?"		Solo
2011	Hiyy Yaara Dheefa	"Hiyy Yaaraa Dheefa" (Title song)		Mohamed Farhad, Ibrahim Rasheed, Hawwa Zahir
2012	Mihashin Furaana Dhandhen	"Thiya Moonah"	Mohamed Abdul Ghanee	Moosa Samau
2012	Love Story	"Heyverikan Nethi Dhanee"		Ibrahim Zaid Ali
2016	Haadharu	"Konme Hin'dheh"		Solo
2016	Vee Beyvafa	"Mihithun Kalaa"	Mohamed Abdul Ghanee	Ibrahim Zaid Ali
2017	Bos	"Bos Dheyhaa Loabivey"	Mausoom Shakir	Mohamed Abdul Ghanee

=== Non-Film songs ===
Year	Album/single	Song	Lyricist(s)	Co-artist(s)
2009	Ehan'dhaanugai Duet	"Kuri Khiyaalu Hithuge Nooraa"		Hussain Shiham
2009	Vaahan'dhaanakun	"Han'dhuves Nagaafaa"		Solo
2010	Ehan'dhaanugai Remix	"Dhin Hiyaa Ishqugaa"		Ibrahim Nashidh
2010	Vaahan'dhaanakun 2	"Nudhaashey Vakivegen"		Solo
2010	Vaahan'dhaanakun 2	"Vaahan'dhaanakun Rovenee" (Group Version)	Mohamed Amir Ahmed (Fares)	Various Artists
2011	Badhunaseebu Loabi	"Reyrey Nidhin"	Hussain Inaz	Ibrahim Zaid Ali, Ahmed Ibrahim (Ammadey)
2011	Ehan'dhaanugai Retro	"Nan Edhemey Hoadhaalan"		Ibrahim Mamdhooh (Mandey)
2011	Tharinge Rey 2011	"Ishqee Maabageechaa"	Ahmed Falah	Mohamed Abdulla
2011	Fini Neyvaa	"Dheynee Jaaney"	Moosa Saaidh	Ahmed Yafiu
2011	Jaadhuvee Thari	"Marudheynee Marudheynee"		Mohamed Abdul Ghanee
2011	Jaadhuvee Thari	"Yaaraa Ey"		Hassan Ilham
2012	Ehan'dhaanugai 1433	"Mihithun Filaa Numedhaaneyey"	Mohamed Abdul Ghanee	Hamdhoon
2012	Hithuge Enme Funminun: S01	"Loabi Mulhin Mahuroom Vefaa"	Mohamed Abdul Ghanee	Solo
2012	Hithuge Enme Funminun: S01	"Thiya Han'dhaan Veyey"	Mohamed Abdul Ghanee	Ahmed Yafiu
2012	Tharinge Rey 2012	"Nunidheynehaa Sazaa"	Yoosuf Mohamedfulhu	Abdulla Zaeem
2012	Single	"Kaarisaa"		Mohamed Abdul Ghanee, Ibrahim Zaid Ali
2013	Tharinge Rey 2013	"Veynee Baarey Baarey"		Ahmed Mahloof
2014	Single	"Aiy Jahaa"		Ahmed Yafiu, Mohamed Yasif, Mauroof Khaleel, Muneefa Ahmed Mujthaba
2014	Tharinge Rey 2014	"Fenna Hin'dhu Konme Thaakun"	Abdulla Muaz Yoosuf	Ali Seezan
2014	Vaahan'dhaanakun 3	"Nuveyhey Maafu Libumeh"		Mohamed Naffan Amir
2014	Vaahan'dhaanakun 3	"Vaahan'dhaanakun Rovenee" (Group Version)	Mohamed Amir Ahmed (Fares)	Various Artists
2015	Ehan'dhaanugai Starz	"Hiyy Rovvaaladhin Farikamey"		Ahmed Shabeen
2015	Minivan 50	"Minivan 50" (Theme Song)	Adam Naseer Ibrahim	Mohamed Abdul Ghanee, Rafiyath Rameeza, Hussain Ali, Unoosha Ahmed Ibrahim (Ammadey)
2016	Ehan'dhaanugai Covers	"Kehidheynamey"	Ahmed Sharumeel	Ahmed Yafiu
2017	Qaumee Dhuvahuge Jalsaa	"Mi Dheenaai Qaumiyyathu"		Mohamed Abdul Ghanee, Rafiyath Rameeza, Ahmed Aathif
2017	Celebrating 20	"Hiyy Vey Gayaa"		Maison
2021	Single	"Loabi Vevumun"	Aminath Riznee (Ritz Lyrics)	Solo
2022	Single	"Hithugaa Jahaa Vindhun"	Aminath Riznee (Ritz Lyrics)	Mohamed Maisan (Bokitos)

== Accolades ==
Year	Award	Category	Nominated work	Result	Ref(s)
2000	Interschool Singing Competition	Best Performer of the age category		3rd Place	
2001	Interschool Singing Competition	Under 9 - Best Performer	"Veheythi Vaarey"	Won	
2001	Interschool Singing Competition	Junior Group - Best Performer	"Veheythi Vaarey"	2nd place	
2008	Interschool Singing Competition	Under 16 - Best Performer	"Ekuveri Vamaahey"	Won	
2008	Interschool Singing Competition	Senior Group - Best Performer	"Ekuveri Vamaahey"	Won	
2008	Interschool Singing Competition	Best Performer of the Competition	"Ekuveri Vamaahey"	Won	
2009	1st Maldivian Icon	Best Performer of the Competition		2nd place	
2010	2nd SunFM Awards	Most Entertaining Female Vocalist		Nominated	
2011	1st Maldives Film Awards	Best Female Playback Singer	"Loabin Thi Hiyy Hiba Kohfinama" - Udhabaani	Nominated	
2015	6th Gaumee Film Awards	Best Female Playback Singer	"Hiyy Dhevijjey" - Niuma	Nominated	
2016	7th Gaumee Film Awards	Best Female Playback Singer	"Thiya Moonah" - Mihashin Furaana Dhandhen	Nominated	
