= Mariyam Ashfa =

Maldivian singer and actress (born 1982)

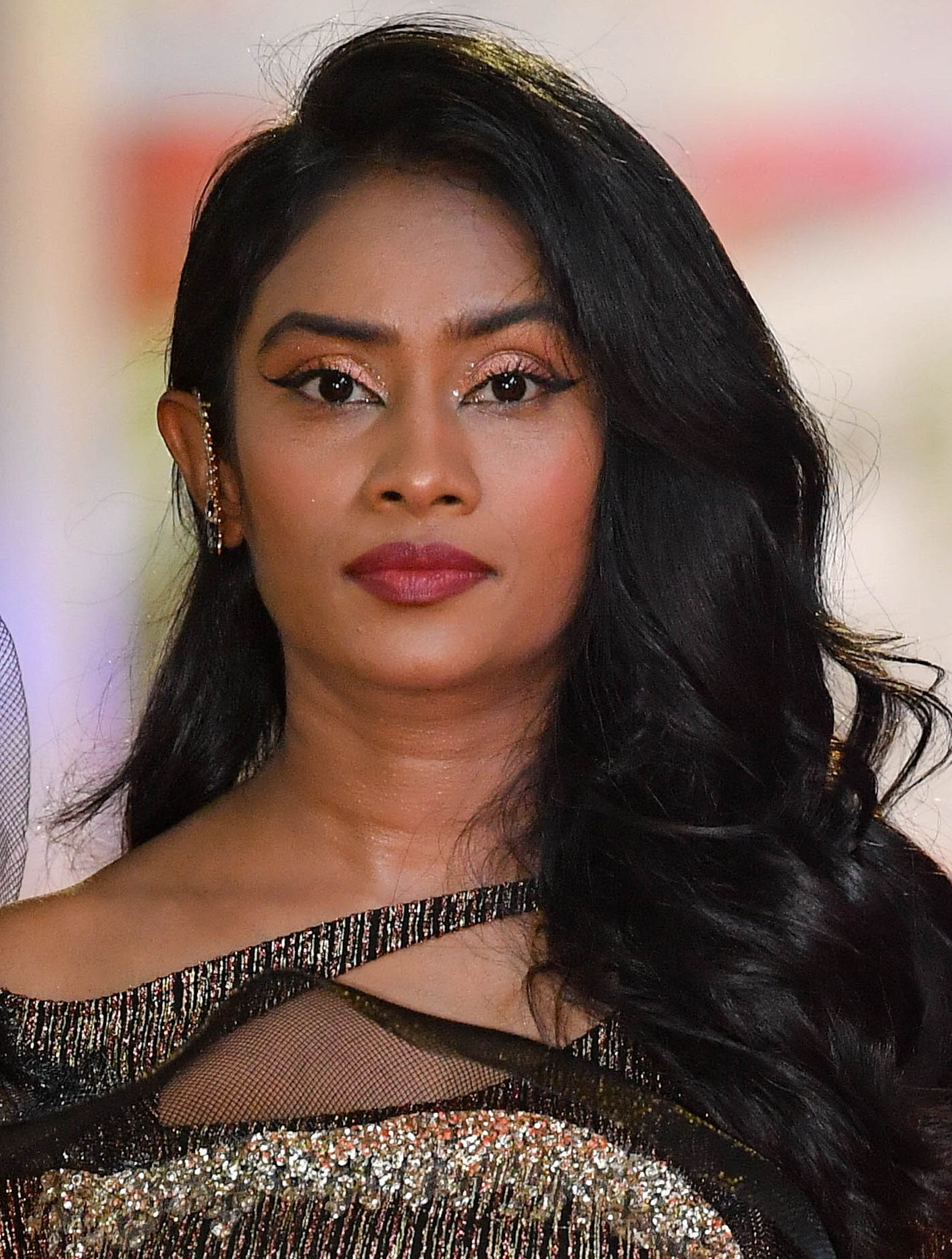
- Ashfa attending Olympus reopening ceremony, 2023
- Born: 25 December 1982 (age 43); Malé, Maldives
- Occupations: Playback singer; actress
- Years active: 2006–present
- Spouses: Mohamed Abdul Ghanee (divorced); Ali Shaniz (m. 2024)
- Children: Yoosuf Alsan Mohamed (deceased)
- Musical career
- Genres: Pop; filmi; electronic
- Instrument: Vocals

Mariyam Ashfa (born 25 December 1982) is a Maldivian singer and actress.

== Career ==
Since a very early age, Ashfa participated in Interschool Singing Competition where she received several accolades for the same. She made her career debut with the song "Dhan Dhan Dhan" from the album Rovvaanulaa (2006). A duet with Mohamed Abdul Ghanee, the song topped several charts upon release and her talent was recognized by the music composers. Even though "Dhan Dhan Dhan" was released earlier, her first recorded song was "Vindhaa Hithaa Jaanaa", another duet with Ghanee. Soon after, she rendered several songs and became a prominent name in the industry. Ashfa received her first Gaumee Film Award nomination for Best Female Playback Singer with the song "Niuma" from the film Niuma (2010). The "pain" and "emotion" in her rendition were praised by the music critics.

Apart from singing, Ashfa received several offers for acting performances which she rejected citing lack of "self confidence" during the time. However, considering the "well-wishes" from her family and friends, she accepted a film offer from director Ravee Farooq, in which the project was halted in pre-production due to several issues. Later on, Dark Rain Entertainment offered her a project titled Beeveemaa which is scheduled to release in 2021.

== Discography ==
=== Feature Film ===
Year	Film	Song	Lyricist(s)	Co-Artist(s)	Notes
2009	Hiyy Rohvaanulaa	"Inthizaarun Hithuga Ufedhey"	Mohamed Abdul Ghanee	Mumthaz Moosa	
2009	Hiyy Rohvaanulaa	"Haaufaa Dheynamey"	Mohamed Abdul Ghanee	Mumthaz Moosa, Ibrahim Zaid Ali	
2009	Hiyy Rohvaanulaa	"Haaufaa Dheynamey" (Remix Version)	Mohamed Abdul Ghanee	Mumthaz Moosa, Ibrahim Zaid Ali	
2009	Hiyy Rohvaanulaa	"Ufaavey Kalaa Fenumun"	Ahmed Falah	Ibrahim Zaid Ali	
2009	Hiyy Rohvaanulaa	"Vaudhey Vevey Mee"	Kopee Ibrahim Rasheedh	Ibrahim Zaid Ali	Appears in Soundtrack album
2009	E Dharifulhu	"Ey Yaaraa"	Mohamed Abdul Ghanee	Solo	
2009	E Dharifulhu	"Hiyy Mi Edhey"	Mohamed Abdul Ghanee	Ibrahim Zaid Ali	
2009	Loaiybahtakaa	"Ishq Kameenaa"		Mumthaz Moosa	Appears in Soundtrack album
2010	Jinni	"Fenifaa Kalaa"	Ahmed Haleem	Mohamed Abdul Ghanee	
2010	Jinni	"Aadhey" (Promotional Song)	Mohamed Abdul Ghanee	Ahmed Ibrahim	Appears in Soundtrack album
2010	Dhin Veynuge Hithaamaigaa	"Annaashey Hinithun Velamaa"	Mohamed Abdul Ghanee	Mohamed Abdul Ghanee, Ibrahim Zaid Ali, Ahmed Shabeen, Aminath Shaufa Saeed, Rafiyath Rameeza	
2010	Veeraana	"Veeraana" (Promotional Song)	Adam Haleem Adnan	Various artists	Appears in Soundtrack album
2010	Fanaa	"Thiya Jismuge Hoonun"	Ahmed Nashidh (Dharavandhoo)	Ibrahim Zaid Ali	
2010	Niuma	"Vindhaa Kulhey"	Mohamed Abdul Ghanee	Mohamed Abdul Ghanee, Abdulla Nashif, Ibrahim Zaid Ali, Aminath Shaufa Saeed	
2010	Niuma	"Niuma" (Title Song)	Mohamed Abdul Ghanee	Solo	Nominated— Gaumee Film Award for Best Female Playback Singer
2010	Vakinuvinama	"Thiya Loabeegaa"	Mohamed Abdul Ghanee	Ibrahim Zaid Ali	
2010	Vakinuvinama	"Han'dhuvaru Bin Ujaalaa"	Mohamed Abdul Ghanee	Mohamed Abdul Ghanee	
2011	Hafaraaiy	"Sissaigen Dhaahaavey"	Mohamed Abdul Ghanee	Mohamed Abdul Ghanee	Appears in Soundtrack album
2011	Hafaraaiy	"Loaiybahtakaa Dheefaanamey"	Mohamed Abdul Ghanee	Mohamed Abdul Ghanee	Appears in Soundtrack album
2011	Sazaa	"Hin'dhukolheh"	Mohamed Abdul Ghanee	Ibrahim Zaid Ali	
2011	14 Vileyrey	"Thaureef"	Mohamed Abdul Ghanee	Mohamed Abdul Ghanee	
2011	Wathan	"Ekamaku Saharoa"	Mohamed Abdul Ghanee	Solo	
2011	Hiyy Yaara Dheefa	"Vindhaa Furaanain" (Promotional Song)	Mohamed Abdul Ghanee	Mohamed Abdul Ghanee, Ibrahim Zaid Ali	Appears in Soundtrack album
2011	Hiyy Yaara Dheefa	"Loabivaa Ey"	Mohamed Abdul Ghanee	Mohamed Abdul Ghanee	Nominated— Gaumee Film Award for Best Female Playback Singer
2012	Mihashin Furaana Dhandhen	"Iyye Dhuh Huvafen"	Mausoom Shakir	Mohamed Abdul Ghanee	
2012	Mihashin Furaana Dhandhen	"Mi Hashin Furaana Dhandhen"	Adam Haleem Adnan	Ibrahim Zaid Ali, Ahmed Yafiu	
2012	Mihashin Furaana Dhandhen	"Neygey Bunaakah"	Mohamed Abdul Ghanee	Mohamed Abdul Ghanee, Ibrahim Zaid Ali	
2012	Love Story	"Saahibaa Ey Magey"	Mohamed Abdul Ghanee	Ahmed Yafiu	
2012	Love Story	"Alathu Loabi"	Mohamed Abdul Ghanee	Mohamed Abdul Ghanee	
2013	Dhilakani	"Inthihaayah"		Mohamed Abdul Ghanee, Ahmed Shabeen	
2014	Aadheys	"Aadheys" (Female Version)	Mohamed Abdul Ghanee	Solo	Appears in Soundtrack album
2014	Aadheys	"Aadheys" (Remix Version)	Mohamed Abdul Ghanee	Ibrahim Zaid Ali	Appears in Soundtrack album
2015	Ahsham	"Loabi Vaavaru"	Mohamed Abdul Ghanee	Ibrahim Zaid Ali	
2016	Vafaatheri Kehiveriya	"Ummeedhu"	Adam Haleem Adnan	Mohamed Abdul Ghanee	
2016	Vafaatheri Kehiveriya	"Vaa Loabi Dhulun"	Mohamed Abdul Ghanee	Solo	Nominated— Gaumee Film Award for Best Female Playback Singer
2016	Vee Beyvafa	"Jaanaa Furaanain"	Mohamed Abdul Ghanee	Mumthaz Moosa	
2017	Malikaa	"Vey Ufaa"	Fathuhulla Abdul Fahthah (Fatho)	Fathuhulla Abdul Fahthah (Fatho)	
2017	Naughty 40	"Farudha"	Mohamed Abdul Ghanee	Mohamed Abdul Ghanee	
2017	Hahdhu	"Giritee Loabin"	Beyya Huhthu	Mohamed Abdul Ghanee	
2017	Hahdhu	"Udhuhilamaa"	Mohamed Abdul Ghanee	Mohamed Abdul Ghanee	Nominated— Gaumee Film Award for Best Female Playback Singer
2017	Hahdhu	"Beehilaashey"	Mohamed Abdul Ghanee	Mohamed Abdul Ghanee	Nominated— Gaumee Film Award for Best Female Playback Singer
2017	Hahdhu	"Dhu'aa"	Mohamed Abdul Ghanee	Yoosuf Alson Mohamed	Nominated— Gaumee Film Award for Best Female Playback Singer
2017	Hahdhu	"Neydheymey Alivileykah"	Mohamed Abdul Ghanee	Solo	
2017	Neydhen Vakivaakah	"Abadhu Ekugaa Vaanee"	Mohamed Abdul Ghanee	Mohamed Abdul Ghanee	
2017	Bos	"Veynthakun Dhin"	Adam Haleem Adnan	Shalabee Ibrahim	
2020	Andhirikan	"Andhirikan"	Mohamed Abdul Ghanee	Mohamed Abdul Ghanee	
2022	Hehes	"Ishq Mee Imthihaan"		Mohamed Abdul Ghanee	
2023	Beeveema	"Beeveema"	Ahmed Zareer	Shalabee Ibrahim	
2023	Beeveema	"Hiyy Adhu Ronee Ey"	Hussain Shihab	Solo	
2023	Beeveema	"Kuri Khiyaal"	Yoosuf Mohamedfulhu	Solo	
2023	Hindhukolheh	"Hithugaa"	Fathuhulla Abdul Fahthah (Fatho)	Fathuhulla Abdul Fahthah (Fatho)	
2023	Loabi Vevijje	"Thiya Ummeedhu"	Mohamed Abdul Ghanee	Mumthaz Moosa	
2023	Loabi Vevijje	"Heelumey Hiyy Furey" (Version 2)	Mohamed Abdul Ghanee	Mohamed Abdul Ghanee	
2023	Nina	"Aa Ummeedh"	Mohamed Abdul Ghanee	Solo	
2023	Nina	"Azza"	Mohamed Abdul Ghanee	Mohamed Abdul Ghanee, Ahmed Ifnaz Firag	
2023	Jokaru	"Vagunge Jagadaa"	Mohamed Abdul Ghanee	Hassan Tholaaq	
2023	November	"Moosun"	Shammoon Mohamed	Solo	MSPA Film Awards for Best Playback Singer — Female
2023	November	"Moosun" (Remix Version)	Shammoon Mohamed	Mohamed Nabeel (Toy)	Appears in Soundtrack album
2024	Mee Ishq	"Shaahee Lolugaa" (Promotional Song)	Azhan Ibrahim	Mohamed Abdul Ghanee	
2024	Lasviyas	"Kiyaaladhee Kiyaaladhee"	Mausoom Shakir	Moosa Samaau	
2024	Saaya	"Thee Hithuge Vindhey"		Mohamed Abdul Ghanee	
2024	Kamanaa	"Kathi Kathi Chaalu Balaalun"	Mohamed Abdul Ghanee	Mohamed Abdul Ghanee, Rafiyath Rameeza	
2024	Kamanaa	"Saafu Loaiybah Adhaa"	Easa Shareef	Mohamed Abdul Ghanee	
2024	Bibii	"Laalu Bibii" (Promotional Song)	Mohamed Nabeel (Toy)	Mohamed Nabeel (Toy)	
2025	Sorry	"Fun'dufun'du Veemaa"	Kaneeru Abdul Raheem	Mohamed Abdul Ghanee	
2025	Sorry	"Hithugaa Thi Soora Vaaney"	Adam Haleem Adnan	Shalabee Ibrahim	
2025	Sorry	"Hithugaa Thi Soora Vaaney" (Promotional Song)	Adam Haleem Adnan	Shalabee Ibrahim, Zahil Ibrahim Rameez	Appears in Soundtrack album
2025	Kan'bulo	"Vaanan Ekeegaa Vaanan"	Mohamed Abdul Ghanee	Ahmed Lais	
2025	Kan'bulo	"Dharifulhaa Ey"	Mohamed Abdul Ghanee	Solo	
2025	Kan'bulo	"Heeveyey"	Mohamed Abdul Ghanee	Hajar Amelia Binth Nihaz	
2025	Kos Gina Mistake	"Reethi Meehun"		Abdullah Shafiu Ibrahim	
2025	Kos Gina Mistake	"Kessaa Veynaa" (Version 1)		Mohamed Abdul Ghanee	
2025	Kos Gina Mistake	"Kessaa Veynaa" (Version 2)		Dewin	
2025	Lily	"Maa Lily" (Promotional Song)	Ribaah Hussain	Mohamed Naail, Ali Yameen	
2025	Lily	"Hiyy Kathiliye"	Mohamed Abdul Ghanee	Mohamed Abdul Ghanee	
2026	Jannath	"Sikunthu Kashi"	Shammoon Mohamed	Solo	
2026	Jannath	"Thee Hithuge Vindhakee"	Ismail Mubarik	Ahmed Naashiu	
2026	Magey Bituge Wedding	"Kaiveni Medley"	Ismail Mubarik	Abdullah Shafiu Ibrahim	
2026	Dhevi	"Dhevi" (Female Version)	Abdulla Muaz	Solo	
2026	Dhevi	"Funhaa Loabi Dheynuthoa Ey"	Naifaru Dhohokko (Additional lyrics by Mohamed Abdul Ghanee)	Solo	
2026	Majunoon	"Dhemeyhen Mibin"	Mohamed Abdul Ghanee	Mohamed Abdul Ghanee	
2026	Keevve?	"Fidhaa"	Izza Ahmed Nizar	Mumthaz Moosa	
2026	Keevve?	"Lolun Thiya Balaalaa"	Easa Shareef	Mumthaz Moosa	
2026	Keevve?	"Keehvehey" (Theme Song)	Easa Shareef	Solo	
2026	Keevve?	"Gulhumey Aailee"	Easa Shareef	Mumthaz Moosa, Zaya Mohamed Umar, Nur Aydin Bin Hassan Jalaal	
2026	Keevve?	"Keevve" (Promotional Song)	Mohamed Abdul Ghanee	Mohamed Maisan	

=== Short films ===
Year	Film	Song	Lyricist(s)	Co-artist(s)
2008	Umurah Salaam	"Rihi Han'dhuvaru Dhey Reyreygaa"	Ahmed Falah	Ahmed Falah
2008	Girlfriend	"Aadhey Aadhey Enmen Aadhey"		Mohamed Abdul Ghanee
2009	Pink Fairy	"Dum Dadum Dum"	Mohamed Abdul Ghanee	Mohamed Abdul Ghanee
2009	Pink Fairy	"Naananayo"	Mohamed Abdul Ghanee	Mohamed Abdul Ghanee

=== Television ===
Year	Title	Song	Lyricist(s)	Co-artist(s)
2007	Vamey Kaireegaa Kalaa	"Vamey Kaireegaa Kalaa" (Title Song)	Mohamed Abdul Ghanee	Mohamed Abdul Ghanee
2019	Huvaa	"Mivaa Gotheh"	Mausoom Shakir	Shalabee Ibrahim
2023	Yaaraa	"Beynunvanee Yaaraa" (Original song by Ahmed Amir)	Mohamed Abdul Ghanee	Mariyam Rifqa Rasheed
2023	Yaaraa	"Aadhey Yaaraa Aadhey"	Mohamed Abdul Ghanee	Various
2023	Yaaraa	" Yaaraa Ey"	Mohamed Abdul Ghanee	Solo
2025	Imthihaan	"Imthihaan"		Ali Inaan Saeed

=== Non-Film songs ===
Year	Album/single	Song	Lyricist(s)	Co-Artist(s)
2006	Hiyy Roaney	"Loabeegaa Vindhey Jahanee"	Ahmed Falah	Ibrahim Zaid Ali
2006	Hiyy Roaney	"Yaaraa Ey Yaaraa Ey"	Mohamed Abdul Ghanee	Mohamed Abdul Ghanee
2007	Hiyy Kiyaathee	"Vindhaa Hithaa Jaanaa Ey"	Mohamed Abdul Ghanee	Mohamed Abdul Ghanee
2007	Hiyy Kiyaathee	"Dhan Dhan Dhanvaru"	Mohamed Abdul Ghanee	Mohamed Abdul Ghanee
2007	Hinithunvelaashey	"Dheyn Fini Hiyy"	Ahmed Falah	Solo
2007	Hiyy Dheebalaa	"Crazy Khiyaaley"	Mohamed Abdul Ghanee	Solo
2007	Thihan'dhaanugai...	"Ey Ehan'dhaan Aadhey"	Aminath Faiza	Solo
2008	Hiyy Sihenee	"Hiyy Sihenee"	Ahmed Falah	Mohamed Abdul Ghanee
2008	Thihan'dhaanugai Remix	"Mee Mihithuge Shakuvaa Ey"		Solo
2008	Jaadhuvee Nooru	"Loabi Chaaloovi Thee Ranparee"	Adam Haleem Adnan	Mohamed Abdul Ghanee
2008	Jaadhuvee Nooru	"Hey Hutteyhaavey"	Adam Haleem Adnan	Mohamed Abdul Ghanee
2008	Hiyy Dhoovee	"Dhuruga Huttas Kalaa Ey"		Mumthaz Moosa
2008	MDP	"Wathan Edhey Migothah"		Various
2008	Fini Roalhi	"Adhu Vanee Dhaahithey"		Mukhthar Adam
2009	Adhives... Loabivey	"Race"		Mohamed Abdul Ghanee
2009	Fenumun Hiyy Magey	"Hiyy Magey Edhevenee"	Adam Jinaah	Mohamed Abdul Ghanee
2009	Ehan'dhaanugai Duet	"Annaashey Kalaa"		Moosa Thoriq
2010	Loabeege Vaguthu	"Mi Meygavaa Hithuvindhu"	Ahmed Haleem	Mohamed Abdul Ghanee
2010	Ehan'dhaanugai Remix	"Dhin Mihitheh"	Jameela Saleem	Abdulla Zaeem
2010	Jaadhuvee Thari	"Aiy Alhaa Aiy Alhaa"		Mohamed Abdul Ghanee
2011	Badhunaseebu Loabi	"Dheewaana Kuree"	Hussain Inaaz	Ibrahim Zaid Ali
2011	Badhunaseebu Loabi	"Mi Hiyygaimu Reygaa"	Hussain Inaaz	Ahmed Ibrahim
2011	Hiyy Dheewaanaa 5	"Yaaraa Fenifaa"		Mohamed Abdul Ghanee
2011	Dhohokkobe: Raaja Raanee	"Funhaa Loabi Dheynuthoa Ey"		Solo
2011	Ehan'dhaanugai Retro	"Qurubaan Vaanee"		Abdullah Shafiu Ibrahim
2011	Tharinge Rey 2011	"Hiyy Dhevijjey Kalaayah"	Adam Haleem Adnan	Ahmed Azmeel
2012	Bodu Rey 2012	"Manzil Thee Hithuge Ufaa"		Solo
2012	Hithuge Enme Funminun: S01	"Magey Dhariyaa"	Mohamed Abdul Ghanee	Solo
2012	Hithuge Enme Funminun: S01	"Haali Falhukollaa"	Mohamed Abdul Ghanee	Fatho
2012	Ehan'dhaanugai 1433	"Rehendhi Kaamiyaabu"	Mohamed Abdul Ghanee	Solo
2012	Ehan'dhaanugai 1433	"Ehan'dhaanuge Asaruthakey"	Mohamed Abdul Ghanee	Various artists
2012	Tharinge Rey 2012	"Hithugaavaa Han'dhaaney"	Abdulla Haseen	Ibrahim Nifar (Thihthi)
2013	Hiyy Dheebalaa 3	"Lovely Girl"	Mohamed Abdul Ghanee	Mohamed Abdul Ghanee
2013	Tharinge Rey 2013	"Loabi Loabi Thiya Heelun"	Adam Haleem Adnan	Ravee Farooq
2014	Hiyy Dheebalaa Collection	"Hiyy Dheebalaa Mix"	Mohamed Abdul Ghanee	Mohamed Abdul Ghanee, Aminath Lamha Latheef, Mariyam Lawfa Hassan
2014	Tharinge Rey 2014	"Fenuneemaa Beley"	Mausoom Shakir	Mohamed Abdul Ghanee
2014	Vaahan'dhaanakun 3	"Gulaabee Maafulhu"		Solo
2014	Vaahan'dhaanakun 3	"Vaahan'dhaanakun Rovenee" (Group Version)	Mohamed Amir Ahmed (Fares)	Various
2015	Gellunu Haaru	"Oagaavedheyshey"		Mohamed Abdul Ghanee
2015	Ehan'dhaanugai Starz	"Kalaa Kalaa Bunebalaashey"	Easa Shareef	Yaamin Rasheedh
2015	Enme Reethi: S01	"Varah Loabivaakan"	Mohamed Abdul Ghanee	Hassan Jalaal
2015	Enme Reethi: S01	"Aavaa Thikhiyaalun"	Mohamed Abdul Ghanee	Solo
2015	Enme Reethi: S01	"Yaaraa Thihan'dhaan"	Mohamed Abdul Ghanee	Solo
2015	Enme Reethi: S01	"Dheynuhey Gengos Vayaa Ey"		Solo
2015	Tharinge Rey 2015	"Saafu Thedhuveri Gothugaa"		Solo
2015	Ran Han'dhaanugai: S01	"Hiyy Nurovvaa"	Ahmed Shakeeb	Mohamed Naffan Amir
2016	Single	"Heeleemaa"	Mohamed Abdul Ghanee	Mohamed Abdul Ghanee
2016	Dr. Naazge Nazarun	"Hiyy Magey Vaathee"		Mohamed Ahmed (Dockey)
2016	Ehandhaanugai Covers	"Vevunee Loaiybey"	Mohamed Abdul Ghanee	Shalabee Ibrahim
2017	Jumhooree 50	"Jumhooree 50"	Adam Naseer Ibrahim	Various artists
2017	Qaumee Dhuvas 1439: Bahuruva	"Khidhumaiy Kuran Mi Qaumah"	Adam Shareef Umar	Various artists
2018	Mi Hithugaa	"Mihithugaa Firumaaladheyshey"	Hussain Inaaz	Hussain Inaaz
2018	7th ABU TV Song Festival	"Flower"		Mohamed Abdul Ghanee
2018	Han'dhakee Thee Hiyy Edhey	"Vaudhey Vanee Hithun"	Mohamed Abdul Ghanee	Mohamed Abdul Ghanee
2018	Dhivehi Fuluhunge 85th Anniversary	"Dhivehi Fuluhun"	Adam Abdul Rahuman	Various artists
2018	Saff Champions 2018	"Aharemenge Ummeedhu"		Various artists
2018	Saff Champions 2018	"Maruhabaa Dhivehi Qaumee Footboalha Team"	Abdulla Afeef	Various artists
2018	Qaumee Dhuvas 1440: Bathalun	"Dharumavantha Rasgefaanu"	Ramla	Hassan Tholaaq, Aminath Saina Mohamed Rasheedh
2019	Single	"Hoadhaifi Kaamiyaabu"		Mohamed Abdul Ghanee, Ibrahim Zaid Ali
2019	Single	"Kiyaa Maruhabaa"	Amir Saleem	Mohamed Abdul Ghanee, Shalabee Ibrahim
2019	Han'dhaan Kurahchey	"Vaafashakun"	Easa Shareef	Solo
2019	Han'dhaan Kurahchey	"Bosdheefaa Dhamun"	Easa Shareef	Mumthaz Moosa
2019	Han'dhaan Kurahchey	"Ehera Han'dhu Dhenhey"	Easa Shareef	Mohamed Abdul Ghanee
2019	Han'dhaan Kurahchey	"Vindhaa Himeyn Vaashey"	Izza Ahmed Nizar	Mohamed Abdul Ghanee
2019	Han'dhaan Kurahchey	"Han'dhaan Kurahchey"	Izza Ahmed Nizar	Mohamed Abdul Ghanee
2019	Iskandharu School 2019	"Qaumee Roohun"	Naaish	Ibrahim Zaid Ali, Eanash, Ainee
2019	Qaumee Dhuvas 1441: Mintheege Hamahamakan	"Qaanoonee Dhaairaa Kurieruvumugaa"		Mohamed Abdul Ghanee, Ibrahim Zaid Ali, Amaanee
2020	Single	"Ilaahee Mibin"	Abdul Rasheedh Hussain	Various artists
2020	Single	"Fenunu Thasveeru"	Hussain	Solo
2020	Single	"Gunamun Midhaa"	Hussain	Ibrahim Zaid Ali
2020	Qaumee Dhuvas 1442	"Naseyhatheh"		Various artists
2021	Adhives Reethi 1442	"Thaakun" (Cover Version)		Solo
2021	Adhives Reethi 1442	"Raalhuthah" (Cover Version)		Solo
2021	Adhives Reethi 1442	"Vaavaru Bunan" (Cover Version)		Solo
2021	Adhives Reethi 1442	"Eki Reyrey" (Cover Version)		Solo
2021	Adhives Reethi 1442	"Kasabun Boavalhu" (Cover Version)	Fenthashi Mohamed Khaleel	Solo
2021	Single	"Shikaara Kollee"	Mohamed Abdul Ghanee	Shalabee Ibrahim
2023	Hiyala Eid Song 1444	"Koadi"	Abdulla Shahid (Teddy)	Hamdhan Saleem (Anna)
2023	Single	"Thoofaany Ishq"	Mohamed Abdul Ghanee	Solo
2024	Single	"Loabivevumun"	Hussain Inaaz	Hussain Inaaz
2024	Hiyala Women's Day 2024	"Hemun Hemun Vaashe Fidhaa"	Abdulla Shahid (Teddy)	Solo
2024	Hiyala Eid Song 1445	"Boakibanbaa"	Abdulla Shahid (Teddy)	Solo
2025	Kamadhoo Eid Ufaa 1446	"Kamadhoo Eid Song 1446"	Mohamed Shameem	Ibrahim Zaid Ali
2025	Araairu	"Mee Magey Raajjeyey"	Abdul Raheem Abdulla	Various Artists
2025	Hiyala Eid Song 1446	"Eid Boamathivanee"	Abdulla Shahid (Teddy)	Solo
2025	Single	"Ran Javaahiru"	Mohamed Abdul Ghanee	Shalabee Ibrahim
2025	Single	"Ishqee Saahibaa"	Mohamed Abdul Ghanee	Solo
2025	Single	"Nookulain"	Fathuhulla Abdul Fahthah (Fatho)	Fathuhulla Abdul Fahthah (Fatho)
2026	Children's Day 2026	"Aslee Ufaa"	Izza Ahmed Nizar	Solo
2026	Kin'bidhoo Eid 2026	"Kin'bidhoo Eid Song"	Ibrahim Naveen	Mohamed Naail
2026	Bodu Eid 1447	"Ufalun Hemaa"		Solo
2026	Maduvvari Suvaasthi Eid 1447	"Suvaasthi Eidge Foareegaa"	Mohamed Abdul Ghanee	Ibrahim Zaid Ali, Mohamed Abdul Ghanee
2026	Sathoara Boduberu Eid Song 1447	"Dhuvelaa"	Abdulla Easafulhu	Naveeh
2026	Hiyala Eid Song 1447	"Ran Ran Nooralya"	Abdulla Shahid (Teddy)	Solo
2026	Fulidhoo Eid Song 2026	"Eid Vedhun"	Abdulla Shahid (Teddy)	Ayaan
2026	Funadhoo Eid Ufaa 1447	"Eidge Roalhi Nayaa"		Mohamed Ageel

=== Religious/Madhaha ===
Year	Album	Madhaha	Lyricist(s)	Co-artist(s)
2019	Aalam	"Maruhabaa Yaa Ramadan"	Adam Naseer Ibrahim	Solo

== Filmography ==
Year	Title	Role	Notes	Ref(s)
2010	Dhin Veynuge Hithaamaigaa	Herself	Special appearance in the song "Annaashey Hinithun Velamaa"	
2010	Veeraana	Herself	Special appearance in the promotional song "Veeraana"	
2019	Karu Hakuru	Herself	Guest role; Episode "Nightingale"	
2023	Beeveema	Raniya	Debut film	
2023	Yaaraa	Sultan's girlfriend	Guest role; "Episode 2"	
2024	Bibii	Herself	Special appearance in the promotional song "Laalu Bibii"	

== Accolades ==
Year	Award	Category	Nominated work	Result	Ref(s)
2011	2nd SunFM Awards	Most Entertaining Female Vocalist		Nominated	
2015	6th Gaumee Film Awards	Best Female Playback Singer	"Niuma" - Niuma	Nominated	
2016	7th Gaumee Film Awards	Best Female Playback Singer	"Loabivaa Ey" - Hiyy Yaara Dheefa	Nominated	
2017	8th Gaumee Film Awards	Best Female Playback Singer	"Vaa Loabi Dhulun" - Vafaatheri Kehiveriya	Nominated	
2019	9th Gaumee Film Awards	Best Female Playback Singer	"Udhuhilamaa" - Hahdhu	Nominated	
2019	9th Gaumee Film Awards	Best Female Playback Singer	"Dhuaa" - Hahdhu	Nominated	
2019	9th Gaumee Film Awards	Best Female Playback Singer	"Beehilaashey" - Hahdhu	Nominated	
2025	1st MSPA Film Awards	Best Debut – Female	Beeveema	Won	
2025	1st MSPA Film Awards	Best Playback Singer – Female	"Moosun" – November	Won	
2025	1st MSPA Film Awards	Best Playback Singer – Female	"Aa Ummeedh" – Nina	Nominated	
2025	1st MSPA Film Awards	Best Playback Singer – Female	"Hiy Adhu Ronee" – Beeveema	Nominated	
