= Mumthaz Moosa =

Maldivian singer

- Born: Male', Maldives
- Occupation: Playback singer
- Years active: 2000–present
- Musical career
- Genres: Pop; filmi; electronic
- Instrument: Vocals

Mumthaz Moosa is a Maldivian singer.

== Career ==
Mumthaz was first heard in the early 2000s where he appeared in some of the local stage shows being performed at that time. After his talent was recognized by the music directors, he was offered to record several songs for studio albums and feature films where the songs "Reydhuvaa Gunamun" from Rasfarihi (2003) and "Hibakuramey" from Saahil (2004) were some of his earlier releases in his professional career. His precise rendition of the songs "Fenna Hin'dhu Konme Thaakun" from Hiyy Dheefaa (2005) and "Ulhe Ulhefa" from Ulhe Ulhefa (2005) turns to be a major breakthrough in his career. He then lent his voice for the song "Loabivaayaanulaa" from the film Zuleykha (2005) which is considered as one of the biggest hits in his career.

At the 6th Gaumee Film Awards ceremony, Moosa received two nominations as Best Male Playback Singer; one for his emotional and sorrowful rendition of the song "Hiyy Rovvaanulaashey" from the film Hiyy Rohvaanulaa (2009) and another for his vocal performance in the song "Hithu Vindhaa" from the film Dhin Veynuge Hithaamaigaa (2010).

In 2012, Mumthaz made a public announcement that he has decided to quit music and regret his involvement in the industry. Afterwards, he only performed religious tracks and advised his followers to avoid listening his music. However, even after he quits music, some of his unreleased songs were included in the soundtrack album of Vee Beyvafa (2016), Neydhen Vakivaakah (2017) and Reyvumun (2018). In 2020, he featured alongside various artists in a cover version of the song "Ilaahee Mi Bin" which was dedicated to front-liners fighting against COVID-19.

Despite stepping away from the musical scene for personal reasons, many of his songs remain popular even after several years of its release. In 2018, Mumthaz was ranked fifth in the list of the "Most Desired Comeback Voices", compiled by Dho?.

== Discography ==
=== Feature film ===
Year	Film	Song	Lyricist(s)	Co-artist(s)	Notes
2005	Zuleykha	"Loabivaayaanulaa" (Duet Version)	Mausoom Shakir	Fathimath Zoona	
2005	Zuleykha	"Loabivaayaanulaa" (Male Version)	Mausoom Shakir	Solo	Appears in Soundtrack album
2005	Zuleykha	"Veynaa Udhaahaa"	Adam Haleem Adnan	Fathimath Rauf	Appears in Soundtrack album
2006	Hithuge Edhun	"Haadha Ufaa Ihusaasvey"	Ahmed Nashid	Aishath Inaya	
2006	Hithuge Edhun	"Fini Fini Vaareyey"	Ahmed Nashid	Lahufa Faiz	
2006	Hithuge Edhun	"Thaubaa Vamey"	Adam Haleem Adnan	Solo	
2006	Hithuge Edhun	"Ran Loaiybakee"	Adam Haleem Adnan	Solo	Appears in Soundtrack album
2006	Hiyani	"Dhaashey Yaaraa"	Adam Haleem Adnan	Fazeela Amir	
2008	Yoosuf	"Loabilee Oyaa"	Mausoom Shakir	Moonisa Khaleel	
2008	Yoosuf	"Theeye Hithugaa Mivaa"	Adam Haleem Adnan	Moonisa Khaleel	
2008	Khalaas	"Hiygaimey Chaaley Chaaley"	Amir Saleem	Aishath Inaya	
2009	Udhabaani	"Gennanee Hiyy Furuvan"	Ahmed Nashid	Shaheedha Mohamed	
2009	Hiyy Rohvaanulaa	"Hiyy Rohvaanulaashey"	Ahmed Falah	Solo	
2009	Hiyy Rohvaanulaa	"Hinithunvelaa Ufaa Dheyshey"	Mohamed Abdul Ghanee	Solo	
2009	Hiyy Rohvaanulaa	"Inthizaarun Hithuga Ufedhey"	Mohamed Abdul Ghanee	Mariyam Ashfa	
2009	Hiyy Rohvaanulaa	"Haaufaa Dheynamey"	Mohamed Abdul Ghanee	Mariyam Ashfa, Ibrahim Zaid Ali	
2009	Hiyy Rohvaanulaa	"Haaufaa Dheynamey" (Remix Version)	Mohamed Abdul Ghanee	Mariyam Ashfa, Ibrahim Zaid Ali	Appears in Soundtrack album
2009	Karuna Vee Beyvafa	"Thiya Loley"		Aishath Inaya	
2009	Karuna Vee Beyvafa	"Hiyy Neyngi Veeyey Dheewaanaa"		Solo	Appears in Soundtrack album
2009	Baaraige Fas	"Hissuthah Heylavvaey"	Ahmed Nashid	Shaheedha Mohamed	
2009	Baaraige Fas	"Hiyy Edhey Moonakee"	Ahmed Nashid	Fathimath Zoona	
2009	Baaraige Fas	"Mithuraage Moonaa Thi Soorayaa"	Ahmed Nashid	Lileetha Massood	
2009	Baaraige Fas	"Haadhaey Beynumee Kalaa"	Adam Haleem Adnan	Aishath Inaya	Appears in Soundtrack album
2009	Loaiybahtakaa	"Ufalugaa Yaaru Thiya"	Adam Haleem Adnan	Hassan Ilham	
2009	Loaiybahtakaa	"Ishq Kameenaa"		Mariyam Ashfa	Appears in Soundtrack album
2010	Mi Hiyy Keekkuraanee?	"Yaaraa Dhekey Hiyy Veyey" (Version 1)		Fathimath Zoona	
2010	Mi Hiyy Keekkuraanee?	"Yaaraa Dhekey Hiyy Veyey" (Version 2)		Shaheedha Mohamed	
2010	Jinni	"Kehiveriveeye Kalaa"		Aishath Inaya	Appears in Soundtrack album
2010	Dhin Veynuge Hithaamaigaa	"Dhoadhi Ran" (Version 1)	Mohamed Abdul Ghanee	Rafiyath Rameeza	
2010	Dhin Veynuge Hithaamaigaa	"Gulshan Nayaa Farikoh Folhey"	Mohamed Abdul Ghanee	Solo	
2010	Dhin Veynuge Hithaamaigaa	"Dhin Veynuge Hithaamaigaa"	Abdul Hannan Moosa Didi	Solo	
2010	Dhin Veynuge Hithaamaigaa	"Dhin Veynuge Hithaamaigaa"	Abdul Hannan Moosa Didi	Solo	Appears in Soundtrack album
2010	Veeraana	"Vindhuthah Mihithugaavaa"	Adam Haleem Adnan	Solo	
2010	Veeraana	"Theeye Hithugaa Mivaa" (Bonus Song)	Adam Haleem Adnan	Moonisa Khaleel	Appears in Soundtrack album
2010	Niuma	"Edhenee Hayaatheh Fashaashey"	Adam Haleem Adnan	Aminath Shaufa Saeed	Appears in Soundtrack album
2010	Heyonuvaane	"Hiyy Adhu Roneeyey" (Male Version)	Hussain Shihab	Solo	
2010	Heyonuvaane	"Loabivaaey Ey Loabivaaey"	Mausoom Shakir	Moonisa Khaleel	
2011	Sazaa	"Lafzuthakey"	Mohamed Abdul Ghanee	Aminath Shaufa Saeed	
2011	Hithey Dheymee	"Saafu Nayaa Han'dhuvaru"	Mohamed Abdul Ghanee	Rafiyath Rameeza	
2011	Hithey Dheymee	"Themuneemaa Dhey Firumun"	Ahmed Nashid	Shaheedha Mohamed	Appears in Soundtrack album
2011	E Bappa	"Ulhe Ulhe Gaimuvee" (Duet Version)		Rafiyath Rameeza	
2011	E Bappa	"Ulhe Ulhe Gaimuvee" (Male Version)		Solo	Appears in Soundtrack album
2011	Wathan	"Hiygaimey Chaaley Chaaley"	Amir Saleem	Aishath Inaya	Appears in Soundtrack album
2011	Laelaa	"Alhe Gaigaa Dhen Beehilaashey"	Ahmed Nashid	Fathimath Zoona	Appears in Soundtrack album
2011	Hiyy Yaara Dheefa	"Thivee Beywafaa" (Version 1)	Mohamed Abdul Ghanee	Rafiyath Rameeza	
2011	Hiyy Yaara Dheefa	"Thivee Beywafaa" (Version 2)	Mohamed Abdul Ghanee	Moonisa Khaleel	Appears in Soundtrack album
2016	Vee Beyvafa	"Jaanaa Furaanain"	Mohamed Abdul Ghanee	Mariyam Ashfa	
2017	Neydhen Vakivaakah	"Mendhan Veemaa"	Mohamed Abdul Ghanee	Rafiyath Rameeza	
2018	Reyvumun	"Hiyy Kiyanee"		Nashidha Ahmed	
2023	Loabi Vevijje	"Thiya Ummeedhu"	Mohamed Abdul Ghanee	Mariyam Ashfa	
2024	Udhabaani 2	"Alhe Gaigaa Dhen Beehilaashey"	Ahmed Nashid	Fathimath Zoona	
2026	Keevve?	"Fidhaa"	Izza Ahmed Nizar	Mariyam Ashfa	
2026	Keevve?	"Lolun Thiya Balaalaa"	Easa Shareef	Mariyam Ashfa	
2026	Keevve?	"Gulhumey Aailee"	Easa Shareef	Mariyam Ashfa, Zaya Mohamed Umar, Nur Aydin Bin Hassan Jalaal	

=== Short film ===
Year	Film	Song	Lyricist(s)	Co-artist(s)	Notes
2005	Dheke Dhekeves 2	"Ey Magey Hithuge Zuvaan"	Adam Naseer Ibrahim	Solo	
2005	Falhi Sikunthu 2	"Inthizaaruge Gitaa"	Adam Naseer Ibrahim	Solo	
2006	Mohamma Kalo V/S Bao Kalo	"Ran Loaiybakee"	Adam Haleem Adnan	Solo	
2006	Dheke Dhekeves 3	"Dhoalhuvee Loabin"	Kopee Mohamed Rasheed	Aishath Inaya	
2006	Salhibe	"Mihithun Mi Kuraahaa Huvaa"		Solo	
2006	Dheke Dhekeves 4	"Jismaai Mey"	Adam Haleem Adnan	Moonisa Khaleel	
2006	Dheke Dhekeves 4	"Loa Tholhey Loa Tholhey"	Hassan Rasheed	Shafeeqa Abdul Latheef	
2007	Handi Ganduvaru Dhonkamana	"Kamanaaey Nikan Bunaashey"		Solo	
2007	Santhi Mariyan'bu 2	"Ey Kobaa Ey Kobaa"		Aminath Nashidha	
2007	Farihibe 1	"Kihineh Jaanaa Mihithah Mivanee"	Ahmed Falah	Solo	
2007	Hiyy Ekaniveemaa	"Mithuraa Kiyaadheyn Ma Veethoa"	Adam Haleem Adnan	Shaheedha Mohamed	
2008	Farihibe 2	"Kilan'bu Koarehge"	Ahmed Falah	Solo	
2008	Farihibe 2	"Farihi Set"	Ahmed Falah	Hassan Ilham, Ahmed Falah, Mohamed Farhad	
2009	Dheke Dhekeves 5	"Ranaafulhu Dhooni"	Mohamed Abdul Ghanee	Solo	
2011	Farihibe 3	"Gaidhuru Nukiyaa"	Ahmed Falah	Solo	
2013	Farihibe 4	"Mahuroomu Vee Alhugan'du"	Ahmed Falah	Solo	

=== Television ===
Year	Film	Song	Lyricist(s)	Co-artist(s)	Notes
2005	Kalaage Haqqugaa	"Veynaa Udhaahaa" (Duet Version)	Adam Haleem Adnan	Fathimath Rauf	
2005	Kalaage Haqqugaa	"Veynaa Udhaahaa" (Male Slow Version)	Adam Haleem Adnan	Solo	
2010	Mohamma Gaadiyaa 2	"Ishqee Maabageechaa"	Ahmed Falah	Rafiyath Rameeza	
2022	Lafuzu	"Lafuzu" (Theme Song)	Adam Haleem Adnan	Aminath Raaya Ashraf	

=== Non-film songs ===
Year	Album/single	Song	Lyricist(s)	Co-artist(s)
1997	Inter-School Singing Competition 1997	"Adhu Adu Ahaa Balaashey"		Solo
2000	Single	"Bahaarun Reethi Maa Bin'dhegen"		Solo
2000	Endheri	"Nufilaane Mi Khiyaalee"		Lushan
2000	Endheri	"Qurubaan Vamey Dhiwaanaa"		Solo
2001	Theeru	"Nasheedhaa, Loabin Thiyahen Noolhey"		Solo
2002	Hulhudhaan	"Nasheedhaa, Loabin Thiyahen Noolhey"		Solo
2002	Hulhudhaan	"Bunan Bunan Loabivaa"		Solo
2003	Eki Reyrey	"Thiya Reethi Zuvaan Moonun"		Lileetha Massood
2003	Eki Reyrey	"Thiya Yaaru Fenifaa"		Solo
2003	Eki Reyrey	"Haraamey Mi Kuranee Dhuniyeyn"		Solo
2003	Eki Reyrey	"Aadhey Hithuge Bahaaraa"		Solo
2003	Hadhiyaa	"Bunan Bunan Loabivaa"		Solo
2003	Hadhiyaa	"Ey Loabivaa Malaa" (Remix Version)		Solo
2003	Mendhan	"Bunan Bunan Loabivaa"		Solo
2003	Rasfarihi	"Fasdheefaa Nudhaashey Vee"		Solo
2003	Rasfarihi	"Reydhuvaa Gunamun"		Solo
2003	Fannaanun	"Ufaaveri Ekuveri Vetteh Mee"		Various Artists
2004	Falak	"Kurafidhara Hiley Hiley"		Solo
2004	Falak	"Thiya Hedhumuge Jareeyaa"		Solo
2004	Falak	"Vaudhuthah Vaathee Hoadhee"		Solo
2004	Saahil	"Hibakuramey"	Adam Haleem Adnan	Fazeela Amir
2004	Ehan'dhaanugai...	"Edhunee Edhunee Vaathee"		Solo
2005	Maahiyaa	"Kuhveriyakeemey"	Adam Naseer Ibrahim	Solo
2005	Maahiyaa	"Sihi Sihi Yaaru Nuhunnaashey"	Adam Naseer Ibrahim	Solo
2005	Hiyy Dheefaa	"Fenna Hin'dhu Konme Thaakun"	Abdulla Muaz Yoosuf	Aishath Inaya
2005	Hiyy Dheefaa	"Vaguthey Dhoa Loa"		Aishath Inaya
2005	Single	"Ehan'dhaaney Kuraanee"		Fathimath Rauf
2005	Ulhe Ulhefa	"Ulhe Ulhefa"	Ahmed Nashid	Fathimath Rauf
2005	Ulhe Ulhefa	"Ey Dance Kurey"	Mausoom Shakir	Lahufa Faiz
2005	Vakivi Hin'dhu	"Isjahaalaneehey Loabivey Buneleemaa"		Solo
2005	Vakivi Hin'dhu	"Loabi Vaavaru"	Ahmed Nashid	Solo
2005	Zuvaanaa	"Hithugaa Vanee Yaaraa Namey"		Shifa Thaufeeq
2005	Yaa' Habeys	"Ey Magey Hithuge Zuvaan"	Adam Naseer Ibrahim	Solo
2005	Yaa' Habeys	"Inthizaaruge Gitaa"	Adam Naseer Ibrahim	Solo
2006	Dhenves...	"Malaa Folhey Thaazaa"	Rusthullo Ismail	Solo
2006	Dhenves...	"Magey Hiyy Thelheyey"	Hussain Sobah	Solo
2006	Dhenves...	"Thiya Kalhiravain"	Adam Naseer Ibrahim	Solo
2006	Dhenves...	"Dheewaana Vedhaneeyey"	Mohamed Abdul Ghanee	Moonisa Khaleel
2006	Funn Loabi (VCD)	"Loabin Beynumey"	Adam Naseer Ibrahim	Solo
2006	Hiyy Dheewaanaa 3	"Ishqu Yaaraa Gendhaneehey"	Ahmed Nashid	Shifa Thaufeeq
2006	Fari Dheyliyaa	"Saadhavileyrey"		Ismail Huzam
2006	Bichaana	"Dhaashey Yaaraa"	Adam Haleem Adnan	Fazeela Amir
2006	Bichaana	"Vaagoiy Angaalaashe Kaloa"		Hussain Ali
2006	Keehve..?	"Thiya Loley"		Aishath Inaya
2006	Kisthee	"Noorey Thiyey"		Fathimath Rauf
2006	Kisthee	"Noorey Thiyey" (Remix Version)		Fathimath Rauf
2006	Mi Hithun	"Mihithun Mi Kuraahaa Huvaa"		Solo
2006	Jism	"Hiyy Mihaaru Vejje Kairi"	Ahmed Nashid	Fathimath Zoona
2006	Hiyy Roane	"Rakiveehey Aiyleemaa Rey"	Ahmed Nashid	Lileetha Massood
2006	Mihan'dhaanugai...	"Dhulakun Huvaa Mi Kuranee"	Yoosuf Mohamedfulhu	Solo
2006	Oh' Salhi	"Loa Tholhey Loa Tholhey"	Hassan Rasheed	Shafeeqa Abdul Latheef
2006	Oh' Salhi	"Jismaai Mey"	Adam Haleem Adnan	Moonisa Khaleel
2006	Oh' Salhi	"Dhoalhuvee Loabin"	Kopee Mohamed Rasheed	Aishath Inaya
2007	Hiyy Kiyaathee	"Ey Kobaa Ey Kobaa"		Aminath Nashidha
2007	Hiyy Dheebalaa	"Dheyshey Loabin Hiyvaru"	Ahmed Nashid	Mariyam Rifqa
2007	Hiyy Beynumey	"Hiyy Beynumey Dhulun"	Ahmed Falah	Solo
2007	Hiyy Beynumey	"Faruvaa Thiya Athun Noonee"	Ahmed Falah	Solo
2007	Loabin Hinithunvelaashey	"Yaaraaey Loabivey"	Ahmed Haleem	Aishath Inaya
2007	Loabin Hinithunvelaashey	"Manjey Manjey"	Ahmed Haleem	Abdulla Waheed, Shaheedha Mohamed
2007	Thihan'dhaanugai...	"Aashiqaa Dhushumah Edhey"	Ibrahim Mansoor	Solo
2008	Kalaa Haadha Loaiybey	"Hithugaa Zuvaan"	Mohamed Shamin	Lileetha Massood
2008	Kalaa Haadha Loaiybey	"Mi Loaiybaa Ufaa Dheefaa"	Hussain Sobah	Solo
2008	Kalaa Haadha Loaiybey	"Mithuraage Mohabbathu Ufulaa"	Ahmed Falah	Shaheedha Mohamed
2008	Beywafaa Viyas	"Udhaahaa Veyn Filaanee"	Adam Haleem Adnan	Solo
2008	Beywafaa Viyas	"Vindhaa Gulhifaa Veemaa"	Adam Haleem Adnan	Aishath Inaya
2008	Hiyy Dheewaanaa 4	"Hithaaey Loabi Dheyshey"	Shareefa Fakhry	Fathimath Zoona
2008	Hiyy Dhemey Loabin	"Nubalaashe Gurudu Fiyayah"		Solo
2008	Hiyy Dhemey Loabin	"Rey Dhusheemey Huvafenugaa Yaaraa"	Adam Haleem Adnan	Fathimath Zoona
2008	Hiyy Fanaa	"Furaanaey Thee Magey"		Solo
2008	Hiyy Fanaa	"Thiya Loabi Hooru Fenumun"		Solo
2008	Hiyy Dhoovee	"Dhuruga Huttas Kalaaey"		Mariyam Ashfa
2008	Hiyy Dhoovee	"Furaana Gandhee Hithey"		Solo
2008	Thihan'dhaanugai Remix	"Vindhu Loabin Jehi Hithehgaa"	Ahmed Falah	Solo
2009	Yaaraa 4	"Aadhebala Thiya Nala Hooru"	Ahmed Nashid	Shaheedha Mohamed
2009	Adhives... Loabivey	"Loabivaa Maafukuraashey"		Solo
2009	Loabi Vaathee (VCD)	"Haadhaey Beynumee Kalaa"	Adam Haleem Adnan	Aishath Inaya
2009	Ali Waheed 2009 (Campaign Song)	"Maathakun Vedhun Kuranee"	Moosa Hassan	Solo
2009	Fenumun Hiyy Magey	"Aadhey Loabin Yaaraa"	Adam Jinaah	Solo
2009	Fari Kamana	"Hiyy Dheyhaa Dheewaanaa Vejjeyey"	Ahmed Haleem	Fathimath Zoona
2009	Mi Dhehiyy Gulhuney	"Mi Dhehiyy Gulhuney"		Shifa Thaufeeq
2009	Mi Dhehiyy Gulhuney	"Hayaathah Dhirun Dhey Zamaan"		Solo
2009	Nazaara	"Dhoonyehge Thun'bun Nukoshey Malakaa"	Zaraana Zareer	Solo
2009	Hiyy Furendhen	"Magey Loabivee Hin'dhu Kuraa"		Solo
2009	Hiyy Furendhen	"Loabeegaa Kalaa"		Lileetha Massood
2009	Hiyy Furendhen	"Yaaru Hiyy Keemathaa"		Aishath Inaya
2009	Feniliyas	"Reethi Moonaa Chaalu Belumaa"		Moonisa Khaleel
2009	Shaahee Kamana	"Mithuraa Haadha Reehchey"		Solo
2010	Single	"Meri Loa Himeyn Mi Reygaa"	Ali Waheed	Solo
2010	Loabeege Vaguthu	"Nuhuttaa Loabidhee Mithuraa"	Ahmed Haleem	Shifa Thaufeeq
2010	Vasmeeru	"Thiya Loa Kuraa Ishaaraaiy"		Rafiyath Rameeza
2010	Vasmeeru	"Keiytherikan Nethi Dhaneeyey"		Fathimath Zoona
2010	Vasmeeru	"Edheyey Mihiyy"		Solo
2011	Badhunaseebu Loabi	"Mihithah Sazaa Nudheyshey"	Hussain Inaaz	Solo
2012	Edhuvasthah	"Loabivey Kiyaa Olhuvaaleehey"	Ibrahim Shareef	Solo
2012	Dhohokko Han'dhaanugai: Raaja Raanee	"Lily Of The Dhivelee"		Solo
2013	Jaanaa	"Han'dhufadha Reethivi Fari Gomaa"	Imaad Ismail	Solo
2018	Qaumee Dhuvas 1440: Bathalun	"Shaheed Hussain Adamge Han'dhaanugai"	Adam Shareef Umar	Various Artists
2018	SAFF Champions 2018	"Kulhe Fisaari Joashugaa"	Abdul Rasheed Hussain	Hussain Sobah, Shaheedha Mohamed
2018	Han'dhakee Thee Hiyy Edhey	"Mendhan Veemaa"	Mohamed Abdul Ghanee	Rafiyath Rameeza
2018	Han'dhakee Thee Hiyy Edhey	"Marey Mithuraa"	Yoosuf Mohamedfulhu	Solo
2018	Han'dhakee Thee Hiyy Edhey	"Marey Mithuraa" (Slow Mix)	Yoosuf Mohamedfulhu	Solo
2019	Shuja 2019 (Campaign Song)	"Thaaeedhugaa Dhaairaa Adhu Othee"		Rafiyath Rameeza
2019	Han'dhaan Kurahchey	"Konme Hinithunvumeh"	Easa Shareef	Solo
2019	Han'dhaan Kurahchey	"Ivey Adu"	Easa Shareef	Solo
2019	Han'dhaan Kurahchey	"Haadha Loabiveyey"	Easa Shareef	Solo
2019	Han'dhaan Kurahchey	"Bosdheefaa Dhamun"	Easa Shareef	Mariyam Ashfa
2020	Single	"Ilaahee Mibin" (Cover Version)	Abdul Rasheed Hussain	Various Artists

=== Religious / Madhaha ===
Year	Album/single	Madhaha	Lyricist(s)	Co-artist(s)
N/A	Al Haqqu	"Meyge Funn Loabi"		Solo
N/A	Huvan'dhu	"Heyobas"		Solo
2014	Ihuge Lhen 2: Waqth	"Abadhu Saafu Noorey"		Solo
2019	Aalam	"Dhiri Hithaa Roohu Alun"	Izza Ahmed Nizar	Solo
2019	Aalam	"Leyaa Leyge Gulhumee"	Easa Shareef	Fathimath Rauf, Hassan Aahil
2020	Covid-19	"Dhu'aage Mih'raabugaa"	Adam Naseer Ibrahim	Ibrahim Zaid Ali, Mohamed Abdul Ghanee, Shalabee Ibrahim, Abdulla Naashif, Ali Zaidh, Hussain Ali, Mohamed Nihan, Abdulla Rasheedh

== Filmography ==
Year	Title	Role	Notes	Ref(s)
2005	Falhi Sikunthu 2	Himself	Special appearance in the song "Inthizaaruge Guitar"	

== Accolades ==
Year	Award	Category	Nominated work	Result	Ref(s)
2015	6th Gaumee Film Awards	Best Male Playback Singer	"Hiyy Rohvaanulaashey" - Hiyy Rohvaanulaa	Nominated	
2015	6th Gaumee Film Awards	Best Male Playback Singer	"Hithu Vindhaa" - Dhin Veynuge Hithaamaigaa	Nominated	
