= Gaumee Film Award for Best Female Playback Singer =

- Awarded for: Best Female Playback Singer
- Country: Maldives
- Presented by: National Centre for the Arts

The Gaumee Film Award for Best Female Playback Singer is given as part of the Gaumee Film Awards for Maldivian films.

The award was first given in 1994. Here is a list of the award winners and the nominees of the respective award ceremonies.

== Superlatives ==
Superlative	Actor	Record
Most awards	Shifa Thaufeeq	4
Most nominations	Shifa Thaufeeq; Mariyam Ashfa	6
Most nominations in a single year	Mariyam Ashfa (9th award)	3
Most consecutive year nominations	Mariyam Ashfa (6th–9th award)	4
Most nominations without ever winning	Mariyam Ashfa	6
Eldest winner	Shifa Thaufeeq (7th award)	43
Eldest nominee	Shifa Thaufeeq (8th award)	44
Youngest winner	Mariyam Rifqa Rasheed (9th award)	25
Youngest nominee	Aishath Maain Rasheed (6th award)	18

== Winners and nominees ==
Year	Photos of winners	Singer	Film and song	Ref(s)
1st (1995)		Fathimath Rauf	"Loabin Ujaalaa" – Dhon Manma	
1st (1995)		No Other Nominee		
2nd (1997)		Shifa Thaufeeq	"Aavaaney Naa" – Masthu	
2nd (1997)		No Other Nominee		
3rd (2007)		Fazeela Amir	"Mihitha Loabi Dheynan" - Amaanaaiy	
3rd (2007)		No Other Nominee		
4th (2007)		Shifa Thaufeeq	"Ossifavaa Iru Eree Ey" - Edhi Edhi Hoadheemey	
4th (2007)		No Other Nominee		
5th (2008)		Fathimath Zoona	"Magey Loabivaa Ey" - Hithuge Edhun	
5th (2008)		No Other Nominee		
6th (2015)		Shifa Thaufeeq	"Aadhey Araamu" - Zalzalaa En'buri Aun	
6th (2015)		Aishath Maain Rasheed	"Hiyy Dhevijjey" - Niuma	
6th (2015)		Mariyam Ashfa	"Niuma" - Niuma	
6th (2015)		Moonisa Khaleel	"Mausoom Hiyy" - Veeraana	
6th (2015)		Rafiyath Rameeza	"Aadhey Aadhey" - Zalzalaa En'buri Aun	
7th (2016)		Shifa Thaufeeq	"Zuvaanaa Thiyanan" – Fathis Handhuvaruge Feshun 3D	
7th (2016)		Aishath Maain Rasheed	"Thiya Moonah" – Mihashin Furaana Dhandhen	
7th (2016)		Mariyam Ashfa	"Loabivaa Ey" - Hiyy Yaara Dheefa	
7th (2016)		Rafiyath Rameeza	"Beyvafaa" - Hiyy Yaara Dheefa	
7th (2016)		Shifa Thaufeeq	"Vamey Fun Khiyaalu" - Fathis Handhuvaruge Feshun 3D	
8th (2017)		Mariyam Unoosha	"Forever in Love" - 24 Gadi Iru	
8th (2017)		Khadheeja Mohamed	"Vaashey Mashaa Ekee" - Vaashey Mashaa Ekee	
8th (2017)		Mariyam Ashfa	"Vaa Loabi Dhulun" - Vafaatheri Kehiveriya	
8th (2017)		Mira Mohamed Majid	"Gandhee Huvaa" - Ahsham	
8th (2017)		Shifa Thaufeeq	"Hiy Meygaa Mibunanee" - Aniyaa	
9th (2019)		Mariyam Rifqa Rasheed	"Vishka" - Vishka	
9th (2019)		Khadheeja Mohamed	"Maazee Aalaa Vumun" - Mee Loaybakee	
9th (2019)		Mariyam Ashfa	"Udhuhilamaa" - Hahdhu	
9th (2019)		Mariyam Ashfa	"Dhuaa" - Hahdhu	
9th (2019)		Mariyam Ashfa	"Beehilaashey" - Hahdhu	

== See also ==
- Gaumee Film Awards
