= Udhabaani =

- Official film poster
- Directed by: Amjad Ibrahim
- Written by: Mohamed Gasim
- Screenplay by: Amjad Ibrahim
- Produced by: Hamid Ali
- Starring: Yoosuf Shafeeu; Amira Ismail; Hamid Ali; Aminath Shareef
- Cinematography: Riyaz
- Edited by: Yoosuf Shafeeu; Abdul Faththaah
- Music by: Ayyuman Shareef
- Production company: Learner's Production
- Release date: February 1, 2009
- Country: Maldives
- Language: Dhivehi

Udhabaani (transl. High tide) is a 2009 Maldivian romantic horror feature film directed by Amjad Ibrahim. Produced by Hamid Ali under Learner's Production, the film stars Yoosuf Shafeeu, Amira Ismail, Hamid Ali and Aminath Shareef in pivotal roles. Upon release, the film received mixed reviews from critics, although it performed well at the box office, making it Ibrahim's most successful venture.

== Plot ==
Lathaafa (Lathaa) (Amira Ismail) is a schoolgirl from a low-income family. Her parents, Adamfulhu (Hamid Ali) and Mariyam Manike (Aminath Shareef), work all day to earn an income hoping to sustain basic necessities. One night, Adamfulhu goes fishing and is dragged into the sea by a supernatural force. Concerned about him, Mariyam Manike searches for him and finds him at the fishing spot sitting idle. On his return, Lathaa and Mariyam Manike observe differences in his habits; forgetting his daily chores and distancing himself from prayer. Lathaa, who is in a romantic relationship with Laami (Yoosuf Shafeeu), a shopkeeper, sees a black shadow at the beach, causing them to stop meeting there.

Two nights later, Laami comes to Lathaa's house and tries to rape her after she refuses to have sex with him. Mariyam Manike opens the door in time and kicks him out. The next morning Laami's father storms out on him for harassing Lathaa, which Laami had no memory of. Lathaa was expelled from school and her father warns her about her relationship with Laami. To clear his suspicions, Laami and his friend, Areesh (Hussain Solah) spy on Adamfulhu and witness him transforming into a monster. After eating raw fish, he transforms back to Adamfulhu and goes back to his house. A few minutes later, they observe the same man, now disguised as Laami, enter Lathaa's room.

The following day, Areesh is found dead. A witch doctor who figures out the truth through Areesh and Laami, explains the events to Mariyam Manike and hands over two amulets to be used for protection. She ties one of the amulets to Lathaa's hand but she does not have the chance to tie the next amulet on her body. The following day, the witch doctor and Mariyam Manike are found murdered in their houses.

== Cast ==
- Yoosuf Shafeeu as Laamiu
- Amira Ismail as Lathaafa
- Hamid Ali as Adamfulhu
- Aminath Shareef as Mariyam Manike
- Hussain Solah as Areesh

== Soundtrack ==
Track listing
No.	Title	Lyrics	Music	Singer(s)	Length
1.	"Kalhu Foige Reythah Gunan"		Hussain Sobah	Fathimath Zoona, Abdul Baaree
2.	"Udhabaani Laa"		Hussain Sobah	Aminath Shaufa Saeed, Hassan Ilham
3.	"Gennany Hiyy Furuvan"	Ahmed Nashid	Hussain Sobah	Mumthaz Moosa, Shaheedha Mohamed
4.	"Loabin Thi Hiyy Hiba Kohfinama"	Ahmed Nashid	Hussain Sobah	Aishath Maain Rasheed, Mohamed Farhad
5.	"Handhuvaruge Alikan Libey"		Hussain Sobah	Abdul Baaree, Fathimath Zoona
6.	"Udhabaani Laigen Fiyey"		Hussain Sobah	Fathimath Zoona

== Accolades ==
Year	Award	Category	Recipients	Result	Ref.
2011	1st Maldives Film Awards	Best Female Playback Singer	Aishath Maain Rasheed	Nominated	
