= Dhon Manma =

- Directed by: Ahmed Sharmeel; Ibrahim Waheed
- Written by: Haajara Abdul Kareem
- Screenplay by: Ibrahim Waheed
- Starring: Haajara Abdul Kareem; Ibrahim Shakir; Ahmed Sharmeel; Mariyam Haajara; Lillian Saeed
- Cinematography: Ibrahim Waheed
- Edited by: Moosa Haleem
- Production company: Star Light
- Release date: 1992
- Country: Maldives
- Language: Dhivehi

Dhon Manma is a 1992 Maldivian drama film directed by Ahmed Sharmeel and Ibrahim Waheed. Produced for Star Light, the film stars Haajara Abdul Kareem, Ibrahim Shakir, Ahmed Sharmeel, Mariyam Haajara and Lillian Saeed in pivotal roles.

== Plotline ==
The mother of two siblings (Mariyam Haajara and Lillian Saeed) passes away leaving the whole family shattered. Their father decides to marry a widow with three children, Jameela (Haajara Abdul Kareem), who has been living under financial strain caused by the dismissal of her husband. The film then portrays the hardship the step-mother endures while striving to create a bond with her step-children.

== Cast ==
- Haajara Abdul Kareem as Jameela
- Ibrahim Shakir as Solih
- Ahmed Sharmeel as Zaid
- Mariyam Haajara as Ashiya
- Lillian Saeed as Shalinee
- Fazeen Ahmed as Hishan
- Abdul Rahman Rauf as Zaid
- Ali Shameel as Shareef
- Mariyam Dhawood as Hamidha

== Soundtrack ==
Track listing
No.	Title	Lyrics	Singer(s)	Length
1.	"Hithun Nufilaaney"		Sama Abbas
2.	"Mi Kuda Kuda Loabi Naana Ah"		Jameela Saleem
3.	"Dheytho Hurin Mirey Dhen Khabar"	Abdul Hannan Moosa Didi	Abdul Hannan Moosa Didi, Sama Abbas
4.	"Loabin Ujaalaa"		Fathimath Rauf
5.	"Furi Furi Dheloa"		Sofa Thaufeeq

== Accolades ==
Award	Category	Recipients	Result
1st Gaumee Film Awards	Best Regional Film	Dhon Manma	Won
1st Gaumee Film Awards	Jury's Award	Haajara Abdul Kareem	Won
1st Gaumee Film Awards	Best Female Playback Singer	Fathimath Rauf - "Loabin Ujaalaa"	Won
