= Bodu 13 Muassasaa =

2011 film directed by Ahmed Falah

- Directed by: Ahmed Falah
- Written by: Ahmed Falah
- Screenplay by: Ahmed Falah
- Produced by: Mohamed Afeef
- Starring: Ismail Rasheed; Ahmed Asim; Aishath Rishmy; Fathimath Azifa
- Cinematography: Moomin Fuad
- Edited by: Ahmed Asim
- Music by: Fathuhulla Abdul Faththaah
- Production company: Afeef Production
- Release date: October 30, 2011
- Running time: 67 minutes
- Country: Maldives
- Language: Dhivehi

Bodu 13 Muassasaa is a 2011 Maldivian political comedy short-film directed by Ahmed Falah. Produced by Afeef Production under Mohamed Afeef, the film stars Ismail Rasheed, Ahmed Asim, Aishath Rishmy and Fathimath Azifa in pivotal roles.

== Premise ==
Dr. PD Mohamed Manik (Ismail Rasheed) and Azman (Ahmed Asim) representing the Bodu 13 Muassasaa, initiate the campaign program in Kaashi Capital City, for the 2013 Maldivian presidential election. Their initial meeting with the City Council went haywire due to Dr. PD's short temper. The priority to their promotion strategy becomes sidelined when they fall in love with Mariyam (Aishath Rishmy) and Sharu (Fathimath Azifa). Despite Dr. PD's several attempts to win Mariyam's love, she rejects all his offers citing her parents' disapproval to Dr. PD's philosophy and political ethics. Complications arise, when Dr. PD realizes that Mariyam's father is the Chief of City Council whom he had a fight during their initial meeting.

== Cast ==
- Ismail Rasheed as Dr. PD Mohamed Manik
- Ahmed Asim as Azman
- Aishath Rishmy as Mariyam
- Fathimath Azifa as Sharu
- Mohamed Sodhiq

== Soundtrack ==
Track listing
No.	Title	Lyrics	Music	Singer(s)	Length
1.	"Baara Theyra Dhe Haas Theyra"	Ahmed Falah	Ahmed Falah	Ahmed Falah	4:11
