= Farihibe =

Maldivian short film series

- Screenplay by: Ahmed Falah
- Produced by: Mohamed Abdulla
- Production company: Dhekedheke Ves Productions
- Country: Maldives
- Language: Dhivehi

Farihibe is a four-part Maldivian short film series written by Ahmed Falah and produced by Mohamed Abdulla under Dhekedheke Ves Productions. The first two installments of the series, directed by Falah were released in 2007 and 2008 respectively. The last two installments of the series were directed by Abdulla Muaz. All the dialogues from Farihibe 4 were conveyed in the form of farihi, a traditional satirical format of a poem.

== List of productions ==
Title	Release date	Director(s)	Producer(s)	Writer(s)	Cinematographer(s)	Editor(s)	Music	runtime
Farihibe 1	19 June 2007	Ahmed Falah	Mohamed Abdulla	Ahmed Falah	Hassan Haleem	Abdulla Muaz	Muaviyath Anwar	53 minutes
Farihibe 2	5 June 2008	Ahmed Falah	Mohamed Abdulla	Ahmed Falah	Ibrahim Moosa	Abdulla Muaz	Ibrahim Zaid Ali	89 minutes
Farihibe 3	16 March 2011	Abdulla Muaz	Mohamed Abdulla	Ahmed Falah	Hassan Haleem	Abdulla Muaz	Muaviyath Anwar	73 minutes
Farihibe 4	2013	Abdulla Muaz	Mohamed Abdulla	Ahmed Falah	Ibrahim Wisan	Abdulla Muaz	Muaviyath Anwar	61 minutes

== Premise ==
=== Farihibe 1 ===
Purposeless, Farihibe (Mohamed Abdulla) sits on a rock in the seashore when his rival Moosafulhu (Ismail Rasheed) appears to bully him. During the heated argument Farihibe catches a glimpse of a pretty young woman, Dhon Aisa (Nadhiya Hassan) and tries his best to hide her from Moosafulhu. However, Moosafulhu sees her for the first time and decides to pursue her love at any cost. This initiates a battle between Farihibe and Moosafulhu to see who can succeed in achieving the love of Dhon Aisa, where the latter starts swinging in both directions.

=== Farihibe 2 ===
Farihibe falls in love with another woman, Zareefa (Mariyam Azza), an orphan, while she has been the center of attention for Mafuthu Ali (Ismail Rasheed). He hires Qadhir (Hamdhan Farooq) to assist him in penning and reciting the most powerful poem, Farihi, to win the heart of Zareefa. Farihibe leads the poem battle and impresses the guardian of Zareefa who advises her to marry him as he seems to be the most eligible candidate to fulfil the will of her dead father. However, in a turn of events, Mafuthu Ali succeeds in finding the jar of silver coins and the poem book as mentioned by the will, which ensured his marriage with Zareefa.

=== Farihibe 3 ===
Farihibe, a wealthy man who despises women in his life, finally agrees to marry Shaheema (Fathimath Azifa) as requested by his mother, which awakens the devastated Moosafulhu (Ismail Rasheed) with jealousy. Farihibe's first wife, Atheela (Mariyam Rana) warns her to watch out for Farihibe as his father is well known for his fourteen marriages. A night later to their wedding, Shaheema failed to prepare food for Farihibe citing that the storeroom of the house was locked. This leads Farihibe to divorce her similar to his first marriage. His third wife, Futhoona (Mariyam Azza) follows the same fate and is ultimately approached by Moosafulhu for marriage which she declines. Muhamma's failing arranged marriages hits a success note when he marries the responsible homemaker, Fadheeha (Aishath Rishmy) who meets his requirement of a perfect wife who can run a household.

=== Farihibe 4 ===
Farihibe is romantically attracted to a young pretty woman, Abidha (Fathimath Azifa) while her vile step-mother (Mariyam Haleem) arranges her marriage with wealthy businessman Ajumal (Ismail Rasheed) who is rumored to be having an affair with Suraiyya (Aishath Rishmy). Farihibe brings up his marriage proposal to Abidha's father who outright rejects him considering his impoverished nature.

== Cast ==
Cast	Part 1	Part 2	Part 3	Part 4
Mohamed Abdulla	Farihibe	Farihibe	Farihibe	Farihibe
Ismail Rasheed	Moosafulhu	Mafuthu Ali	Moosafulhu	Ajumal
Nadhiya Hassan	Dhon Aisa			
Mariyam Azza		Zareefa	Futhoona	
Hamdhan Farooq		Kandunoo Qadhir	Ishqee Abeeru	
Aminath Rasheedha		Khalidha		
Mohamed Adham		Alifulhu		
Yoosuf		Yoosube		
Ahmed Hussain		Seytu		
Aishath Rishmy			Fadheeha	Suraiyya
Fathimath Azifa			Shaheema	Abidha
Aminath Rana			Atheela	
Mariyam Haleem				Abidha's step-mother

== Soundtrack ==
Farihibe 1
No.	Title	Lyrics	Music	Singer(s)	Length
1.	"Aniyaage Handharakaa"	Ahmed Falah	Hussain Sobah	Mohamed Farhad	4:11
2.	"Kihineh Jaanaa Mihithah Mivanee"	Ahmed Falah	Hussain Sobah	Mumthaz Moosa
3.	"Kuredhi Lakudin"	Ahmed Falah	Hussain Sobah	Mohamed Farhad
4.	"Kalhirava Thooney Nooney"	Ahmed Falah	Hussain Sobah	Hassan Ilham	3:23
5.	"Adi Neygey Maakanduga"	Ahmed Falah	Hussain Sobah	Ahmed Falah	3:20

Farihibe 2
No.	Title	Lyrics	Music	Singer(s)	Length
1.	"Velaa Bis Alhan Dhaa"	Ahmed Falah		Ahmed Falah	3:42
2.	"Farihi Set"	Ahmed Falah	Hussain Sobah	Mumthaz Moosa, Ahmed Falah, Mohamed Farhad, Hassan Ilham	5:47
3.	"Kilanbu Koarehge Fengandu"	Ahmed Falah		Mumthaz Moosa	4:36
4.	"Gathiyya Thila Galun"	Ahmed Falah		Ahmed Falah	8:09
5.	"Valhi Reethivaanee"	Ahmed Falah		Abdulla Nashif
6.	"Aniyaage Buradhan Hifaigen"	Ahmed Falah		Mohamed Farhad

Farihibe 3
No.	Title	Lyrics	Music	Singer(s)	Length
1.	"Maa Kanduge Adiah"	Ahmed Falah	Ibrahim Zaid Ali	Mukhthar Adam
2.	"Gaidhuru Nukiyaa"	Ahmed Falah	Muaviyath Anwar	Mumthaz Moosa
3.	"Udhuhi Dhooni Fulhu"	Ahmed Falah	Ibrahim Zaid Ali	Ibrahim Zaid Ali
4.	"Thin Goh Dhunburi"	Ahmed Falah	Muaviyath Anwar	Ahmed Falah
5.	"Hatharu Kandu"	Ahmed Falah	Ibrahim Zaid Ali	Abdulla Nashif

Farihibe 4
No.	Title	Lyrics	Music	Singer(s)	Length
1.	"Fariyah Folhey Reethi"	Ahmed Falah	Muaviyath Anwar	Abdulla Nashif	3:35
2.	"Riyaleh Nagan"	Ahmed Falah	Muaviyath Anwar	Mohamed Abdul Ghanee	4:20
3.	"Dhun Elhi Fariyaa"	Ahmed Falah	Ibrahim Zaid Ali	Ibrahim Zaid Ali	4:43
4.	"Mahroom Vee Alhugandu"	Ahmed Falah	Muaviyath Anwar	Mumthaz Moosa	3:44
5.	"Ishqee Mihithugaa"	Ahmed Falah	Muaviyath Anwar	Ahmed Falah	3:44

== Accolades ==
Year	Award	Category	Recipients	Nominated film	Result	Ref.
2012	2nd Maldives Film Awards	Best Film - Short film	Farihibe 3		Won	
2014	3rd Maldives Film Awards	Best Film - Short film	Farihibe 4		Won	
2014	3rd Maldives Film Awards	Best Director - Short film	Abdulla Muaz	Farihibe 4	Won	
2014	3rd Maldives Film Awards	Best Actor - Short film	Mohamed Abdulla	Farihibe 4	Won	
2014	3rd Maldives Film Awards	Best Actress - Short film	Fathimath Azifa	Farihibe 4	Won	
2014	3rd Maldives Film Awards	Best Supporting Actor - Short film	Ismail Rasheed	Farihibe 4	Won	
2014	3rd Maldives Film Awards	Best Supporting Actress - Short film	Aishath Rishmy	Farihibe 4	Won	
2014	3rd Maldives Film Awards	Best Editing	Abdulla Muaz	Farihibe 4	Nominated	
2014	3rd Maldives Film Awards	Best Screenplay - Short film	Ahmed Falah	Farihibe 4	Won	
2014	3rd Maldives Film Awards	Best Cinematography - Short film	Ibrahim Wisan	Farihibe 4	Won	
2014	3rd Maldives Film Awards	Best Makeup Artist - Short film	Aishath Rishmy, Fathimath Azifa	Farihibe 4	Won	
2017	8th Gaumee Film Awards	Best Film - Short film	Farihibe 4		Nominated	
2017	8th Gaumee Film Awards	Best Director - Short film	Abdulla Muaz	Farihibe 4	Nominated	
2017	8th Gaumee Film Awards	Best Actor - Short film	Mohamed Abdulla	Farihibe 4	Nominated	
2017	8th Gaumee Film Awards	Best Actress - Short film	Fathimath Azifa	Farihibe 4	Won	
2017	8th Gaumee Film Awards	Best Supporting Actor - Short film	Ismail Rasheed	Farihibe 4	Nominated	
2017	8th Gaumee Film Awards	Best Supporting Actor - Short film	Ismail Rasheed	Farihibe 3	Nominated	
2017	8th Gaumee Film Awards	Best Supporting Actress - Short film	Aishath Rishmy	Farihibe 4	Nominated	
2017	8th Gaumee Film Awards	Best Supporting Actress - Short film	Aishath Rishmy	Farihibe 3	Nominated	
2017	8th Gaumee Film Awards	Best Supporting Actress - Short film	Fathimath Azifa	Farihibe 3	Nominated	
2017	8th Gaumee Film Awards	Best Editing - Short film	Abdulla Muaz	Farihibe 4	Nominated	
2017	8th Gaumee Film Awards	Best Editing - Short film	Abdulla Muaz	Farihibe 3	Nominated	
2017	8th Gaumee Film Awards	Best Cinematography - Short film	Ibrahim Wisan	Farihibe 4	Nominated	
2017	8th Gaumee Film Awards	Best Cinematography - Short film	Hassan Haleem	Farihibe 3	Nominated	
