= Mihashin Furaana Dhandhen =

- Official film poster
- Directed by: Ravee Farooq
- Produced by: Fathimath Nahula
- Starring: Niuma Mohamed; Mohamed Manik; Ali Seezan
- Cinematography: Ibrahim Wisan
- Edited by: Ahmed Shah Ali
- Music by: Ibrahim Nifar
- Production company: Crystal Entertainment
- Release date: February 28, 2012
- Country: Maldives
- Language: Dhivehi

Mihashin Furaana Dhandhen is a 2012 Maldivian romantic drama film directed by Ravee Farooq. Produced by Fathimath Nahula under Crystal Entertainment, the film stars Niuma Mohamed, Mohamed Manik and Ali Seezan in pivotal roles. The film was released on 28 February 2012.

== Cast ==
- Niuma Mohamed as Saara
- Ali Seezan as Shiyaz
- Mohamed Manik as Amir
- Roanu Hassan Manik as Hassan
- Ahmed Nimal as Asim
- Mariyam Shakeela as Wadheefa

== Soundtrack ==
Track listing
No.	Title	Lyrics	Music	Singer(s)	Length
1.	"Furathama Nazaru"	Mohamed Abdul Ghanee	Ibrahim Zaid Ali	Ibrahim Zaid Ali	03:39
2.	"Iyye Dhuh Huvafen"	Mausoom Shakir	Ibrahim Zaid Ali	Mariyam Ashfa, Mohamed Abdul Ghanee	04:49
3.	"Mi Hashin Furaana Dhandhen"	Adam Haleem Adnaan	Ibrahim Zaid Ali	Ibrahim Zaid Ali, Mariyam Ashfa, Ahmed Yafiu	06:10
4.	"Neygey Bunaakah"	Mohamed Abdul Ghanee	Ibrahim Zaid Ali	Ibrahim Zaid Ali, Mariyam Ashfa, Mohamed Abdul Ghanee	06:08
5.	"Sihijjey Birun"	Mausoom Shakir	Ibrahim Zaid Ali	Rafiyath Rameeza, Humaidh	05:27
6.	"Thiya Moonah"	Mohamed Abdul Ghanee	Moosa Samaau	Moosa Samaau, Aishath Maain Rasheed	05:55
7.	"Thiya Moonah" (Slow version)	Mohamed Abdul Ghanee	Moosa Samaau	Moosa Samaau	02:01
Total length:					34:12

== Release and reception ==
Upon release, the film received mixed response from critics. Ahmed Nadheem of Haveeru noted the film as "the best Maldivian melodramatic film" he had seen in the past two years. Impressed with the performance of actors, cinematography and back music, Nadheem was displeased with he plot of film for having resemblance to Subhash Ghai's musical romantic drama film Taal (1999) and Sanjay Leela Bhansali-directed Hum Dil De Chuke Sanam of the same genre and released in the same year.

== Accolades ==
Award	Category	Recipients	Result	Ref.
3rd Maldives Film Awards	Best Film	Mihashin Furaana Dhandhen	Nominated	
3rd Maldives Film Awards	Best Director	Ravee Farooq	Nominated	
3rd Maldives Film Awards	Best Supporting Actor	Ahmed Nimal	Nominated	
3rd Maldives Film Awards	Best Supporting Actress	Mariyam Shakeela	Nominated	
3rd Maldives Film Awards	Best Screenplay	Fathimath Nahula	Nominated	
3rd Maldives Film Awards	Best Costume Design	Fathimath Nahula	Nominated	
3rd Maldives Film Awards	Best Original Songs	Mohamed Abdul Ghanee	Nominated	
3rd Maldives Film Awards	Best Original Songs	Mohamed Abdul Ghanee, Moosa Samau	Nominated	
3rd Maldives Film Awards	Best Original Music	Ibrahim Nifar	Nominated	
3rd Maldives Film Awards	Best Choreography	Ravee Farooq	Nominated	
7th Gaumee Film Awards	Best Actress	Niuma Mohamed	Nominated	
7th Gaumee Film Awards	Best Supporting Actor	Ahmed Nimal	Nominated	
7th Gaumee Film Awards	Best Supporting Actor	Roanu Hassan Manik	Nominated	
7th Gaumee Film Awards	Best Original Song	Mohamed Abdul Ghanee	Nominated	
7th Gaumee Film Awards	Best Original Song	Moosa Samau for "Thiya Moonah"	Nominated	
7th Gaumee Film Awards	Best Lyricist	Mohamed Abdul Ghanee	Won	
7th Gaumee Film Awards	Best Lyricist	Adam Haleem Adnan	Nominated	
7th Gaumee Film Awards	Best Playback Singer – Male	Moosa Samau for "Thiya Moonah"	Nominated	
7th Gaumee Film Awards	Best Playback Singer – Female	Aishath Maain Rasheed for "Thiya Moonah"	Nominated	
7th Gaumee Film Awards	Best Choreography	Ravee Farooq	Won	
