= Hiyy Rohvaanulaa =

- Official film poster
- Directed by: Yoosuf Shafeeu
- Screenplay by: Yoosuf Shafeeu
- Produced by: Mohamed Abdulla
- Starring: Yoosuf Shafeeu; Niuma Mohamed; Abdulla Muaz; Nadhiya Hassan
- Cinematography: Ibrahim Wisan
- Edited by: Yoosuf Shafeeu; Abdulla Muaz
- Music by: Ayyuman Shareef
- Production company: Dhekedheke Ves Productions
- Release date: 29 March 2009
- Running time: 207 minutes
- Country: Maldives
- Language: Dhivehi

Hiyy Rohvaanulaa is a 2009 Maldivian drama film written and directed by Yoosuf Shafeeu. Produced by Mohamed Abdulla under Dhekedheke Ves Productions, the film stars Shafeeu, Niuma Mohamed, Abdulla Muaz and Nadhiya Hassan in pivotal roles.

== Plot ==
Zeeshan (Niuma Mohamed) and Najoo (Nadhiya Hassan), two college students, visit a nearby island to do their practicum and they are being supervised by school's senior supervisor Shiyan (Yoosuf Shafeeu). He falls in love with Zeeshan and profess his love for her though she is petrified to romantically involve with anyone. After two weeks of teaching practicum, they leave the island without giving a proper reply to Shiyan's proposal. Weeks later, Zeeshan called Shiyan and agrees to marry him. After their wedding, they go to picnic to an uninhabited island where he is unexpectedly hit by a coconut while sleeping beneath a palm tree. Shiyan loses his eyesight and they moved to Zeeshan's island.

Four months later, on his friend's request, Shiyan agrees to let Vishal (Abdulla Muaz) stay at his house, who has been exiled from his island for being involved in a gang fight. It was revealed that Vishal and Zeeshan were in romantic relationship few years back and they were separated when Vishal had to leave abroad for further studies. Zeeshan, afraid of his madness, was looking for a chance to escape from his insanity. Shiyan departs for UK with his friend Ahmeen (Miraz Farooq) for a medical operation to regain his eyesight. Soon after, Shiyan's mother had to leave for Hajj, hence Zeesha invites Najoo to their house, scared of being alone with Vishal. At Shiyan's absence, Vishal threatens Zeeshan to seek divorce from Shiyan if she does not want to be exposed.

Shiyan called Zeeshan and lies that the operation was unsuccessful, planning to surprise her with the good news only after he returns. However, on his return, he was startled to witness Zeeshan and Vishal together and decided to continue his charade of blindness to discover their real relationship. Zeeshan reveals her past to Shiyan but he differed to believe her. Vishal and Zeeshan engages in a fight before Shiyan hits Vishal on his forehead with a steel rod. He beats him several times till Vishal falls unconscious. Suffering from internal bleeding, Vishal dies of the injury while Shiyan is sentenced to prison. Several years later, he was released from jail and reunites with Zeeshan and their child.

== Cast ==
- Yoosuf Shafeeu as Shiyan
- Niuma Mohamed as Zeeshan
- Abdulla Muaz as Vishal
- Nadhiya Hassan as Najoo
- Miraz Farooq as Ahmeen
- Arifa as Shiyan's mother
- Moosa as Zeeshan's father

== Soundtrack ==
Track listing
No.	Title	Lyrics	Music	Singer(s)	Length
1.	"Haa Ufaa Dheynamey"	Mohamed Abdul Ghanee	Ibrahim Zaid Ali	Mumthaz Moosa, Mariyam Ashfa, Ibrahim Zaid Ali
2.	"Ufaavey Kalaa Fenumun"	Ahmed Falah	Ibrahim Zaid Ali	Mariyam Ashfa, Ibrahim Zaid Ali
3.	"Inthizaarun Hithuga Ufedhey"	Mohamed Abdul Ghanee	Ibrahim Zaid Ali	Mumthaz Moosa, Mariyam Ashfa
4.	"Hiyy Rovvaanulaashey"	Ahmed Falah	Ibrahim Zaid Ali	Mumthaz Moosa
5.	"Hinithunvelaa Ufaa Dheyshey"	Mohamed Abdul Ghanee	Ibrahim Zaid Ali	Mumthaz Moosa

== Accolades ==
Year	Award	Category	Recipients	Result	Ref.
2011	1st Maldives Film Awards	Best Actress	Niuma Mohamed	Nominated	
2011	1st Maldives Film Awards	Best Supporting Actor	Abdulla Muaz	Won	
2011	1st Maldives Film Awards	Best Choreographer	Yoosuf Shafeeu, Abdulla Muaz for "Haa Ufaa"	Nominated	
2015	6th Gaumee Film Awards	Best Actress	Niuma Mohamed	Nominated	
2015	6th Gaumee Film Awards	Best Original Song	Hussain Sobah and Ahmed Falah for "Hiyy Rovvaanula"	Nominated	
2015	6th Gaumee Film Awards	Best Male Playback Singer	Mumthaz Moosa for "Hiyy Rovvaanulaashey"	Nominated	
2015	6th Gaumee Film Awards	Best Costume Design	Mohamed Abdulla and Niuma Mohamed	Nominated	
