= Mohamed Farhad =

Maldivian male singer

- Born: 25 June 1982 (age 43); Th. Madifushi, Maldives
- Occupation: Playback singer
- Years active: 2005–present
- Musical career
- Genres: Pop; filmi; electronic
- Instrument: Vocals

Mohamed Farhad (18 sep 1999) is a Maldivian singer.

== Early life and career ==
Farhad was born on 25 June 1982 in Th. Madifushi. Since childhood, he was exposed to music of several genres which leads him to perform in the stage shows held in some of the occasions. In 2005, he performed the track "Jahanvaane Athaa Athaa" for the album Yaahabeys (2005) which was ultimately included in Mohamed Abdulla's comedy short film series, Falhi Sikunthu 2 (2005). He then collaborated with Abdulla for several other projects including the Farihibe series. In 2009, he auditioned for a local television singing show, Maldivian Icon where he got selected as the second runner-up of the competition, which resulted in him further expanding his career as a singer with several offers from music directors and producers. The same year, he recorded his first song in a feature film, the romantic track "Loabin Thi Hiyy Hiba Kohfinama" from the film Udhabaani (2009) followed by the groovy dance track "Fenifaa Zuvaan" from the film Baaraige Fas (2009). He next contributed to the soundtrack album of the films Veeraana (2010), Hithey Dheymee (2011) and Hiyy Yaara Dheefa (2011). Some of his notable songs include, "Kalaa Keehvehey Vakivee Yaaraa" from Vakivi Hin'dhu (2006), "Loabivaa Thihan'dhaan" from I Love You (2010), "Dhaiygoani Ossaalaaneyoa" from Santhi Mariyan'bu 3 (2010) and "Ekugaa Loabin Yaaru Ulhefaa" from Jaanaa (2013).

== Discography ==
=== Feature film ===
Year	Film	Song	Lyricist(s)	Co-Artist(s)	Notes
2009	Udhabaani	"Loabin Thihiyy Hibakohfinama"		Aishath Maain Rasheed	
2009	Baaraige Fas	"Fenifaa Zuvaan"		Moonisa Khaleel	
2010	Veeraana	"Veeraanaa" (Promotional Song)	Adam Haleem Adhnan	Various	Appears in Soundtrack
2011	Hithey Dheymee	"Hithey Dheymee"		Rafiyath Rameeza	
2011	Hithey Dheymee	"Hithey Dheymee" (Slow Version)		Rafiyath Rameeza	
2011	Hithey Dheymee	"Vey Kalaa Furaanaigaa"	Mohamed Abdul Ghanee	Rafiyath Rameeza	
2011	Hiyy Yaara Dheefa	"Hiyy Yaaraa Dheefaa"		Aishath Maain Rasheed, Ibrahim Nashidh, Hawwa Zahira	

=== Short film ===
Year	Film	Song	Lyricist(s)	Co-Artist(s)	Notes
2005	Falhi Sikunthu 2	"Jahanvaane Athaa Athaa"	Adam Naseer Ibrahim	Solo	Appears in Yaahabeys album
2007	Farihibe 1	"Aniyaage Handharakaa"	Ahmed Falah	Solo	
2007	Farihibe 1	"Kuredhi Lakudin"	Ahmed Falah	Solo	
2007	Hiyy Ekaniveemaa	"Hiyy Ekaniveemaa" (Title Song)	Ahmed Falah	Solo	Appears in Hiyy Beynumey album
2008	Farihibe 2	"Aniyaage Buradhan"	Ahmed Falah	Solo	
2008	Farihibe 2	"Farihi Set"	Ahmed Falah	Mumthaz Moosa, Hassan Ilham, Ahmed Falah	
2010	Santhi Mariyan'bu 3	"Dhaiygoani Ossaalaaneyoa"	Amjad Ibrahim	Solo	

=== Television ===
Year	Film	Song	Lyricist(s)	Co-Artist(s)
2011	Furaana Dheynan	"Furaana Dheynan" (Title Song)		Rafiyath Rameeza
2019	Maayoos	"Maayoos"	Ali Mihad	Solo

=== Non-Film songs ===
Year	Album/single	Song	Lyricist(s)	Co-artist(s)
—N/a	—N/a	"Mee Roifaa Kuraa"		Solo
—N/a	—N/a	"Ey Hithaa Ey"		Solo
—N/a	—N/a	"Rovvaaneyey Dheefaa Ufaa"		Solo
—N/a	Dhohokkobe: Raaja Raanee	"Edheynee Mi Shabaab"		Solo
2005	Yaahabeys	"Jahanvaane Athaa Athaa"	Adam Naseer Ibrahim	Solo
2006	Vakivi Hin'dhu	"Kalaa Keehvehey Vakivee Yaaraa"	Adam Haleem Adhnan	Solo
2006	Hiyy Roaney	"Mirey Boadhee Balan"	Ahmed Falah	Hussain Sobah
2007	Loabin Hinithunvelaashey...	"Gendhaashey Gendhaashey"	Ahmed Haleem	Shaheedha Mohamed
2007	Hiyy Beynumey	"Hiyy Ekaniveemaa"	Ahmed Falah	Solo
2007	Thihan'dhaanugai...	"Hithaa Roohun Asaru Kuranee"		Solo
2008	Hiyy Dhemey Loabin	"Vey Dhekey Hiyy Nikan"		Moonisa Khaleel
2008	Hiyy Dhemey Loabin	"Thiee Thiee Ey Magey Loaiybakee"		Moonisa Khaleel, Hussain Sobah
2008	Kalaa Haadha Loaiybey	"Dhera Hiyy Vee Mithuraa Dhaathee Ey"		Moonisa Khaleel
2008	Kalaa Haadha Loaiybey	"I'm In Love"	Ahmed Falah	Rafiyath Rameeza
2008	Kalaa Haadha Loaiybey	"Mifuraana Dhen Hayaathaa"		Solo
2008	Maumoon 2008	"Mi Maumoon Hovan Hovan"		Hussain Sobah, Rafiyath Rameeza, Fathimath Zoona
2008	Thihan'dhaanugai Remix	"Ekamanaa"	Ahmed Nashidh (Dharavandhoo)	Solo
2009	Foni Foni 2	"Enme Reethi Soora Ey"		Lileetha Massoodh
2009	Hiyy Furendhen	"Vindhaa Leygaavaa"		Fathimath Rauf
2009	Nazaaraa	"Reethivi Moonaa"	Zarana Zareer	Solo
2009	Single	"Dhaaney Dhimaaleh"		Solo
2009	Single	"Loabi Dheefaa Dhiyaimaa Roveyney"		Solo
2009	Single	"Ishqugaa Thiya Dhin Araama"		Solo
2010	I Love You	"Loabivaa Thihan'dhaan"		Fathimath Zeenath
2010	I Love You	"Fini Fini Roalhin"		Solo
2010	Kan'bulo - VCD	"Majubooruvee Vakivaashey Dhen"	Ahmed Nashidh (Dharavandhoo)	Solo
2011	Badhunaseebu Loabi	"Edhuvas En'buri Annaanehey"	Hussain Inaaz	Solo
2011	Badhunaseebu Loabi	"Keiynuvaaney Yaaru Dhurugaa"	Hussain Inaaz	Rafiyath Rameeza
2011	Leveythee Mineyvaa	"Heekuree Miee Dhushmanehhey"		Hussain Sobah, Aishath Afaaf
2011	Single	"Hiyy Halaakey Vanee"		Solo
2013	Dhooni Magey	"Dhuniyeyge Kan Hin'gaa Gothun"		Solo
2013	Hiyy Dheewaanaa 6	"Vaa Ishqu Hithugaa"		Solo
2013	Jaanaa	"Ekugaa Loabin Yaaru Ulhefaa"	Imaadh Ismail	Rafiyath Rameeza
2013	Single	"Kashithah Herey"		Hassan Tholaaq
2015	Single	"Beehilaa Mi Roalhi Bunedhey"		Rafiyath Rameeza
2015	Ran Han'dhaanugai... S01	"Bunelabalaashey Loabivaa"		Aminath Athoofa
2017	Ran Han'dhaanugai... S02	"Aslu Athugaa Beehilaa"		Leela
2017	Qaumee Dhuvas 1439: Bahuruva	"Mamenge Mi Raajje Minivanvun"		Mohamed Ishaan, Abdulla Hishaan
2020	Single	"Gislanee Dhuniye Mithaa"		Solo

== Filmography ==
Year	Title	Role	Notes	Ref(s)
2010	Veeraana	Himself	Special appearance in the promotional song "Veeraana"	

== Accolades ==
Year	Award	Category	Nominated work	Result	Ref(s)
2009	1st Maldivian Icon	Best Performer of the Competition		3rd Place	
