= Vee Beyvafa =

- Official film poster
- Directed by: Ibrahim Wisan
- Written by: Ahmed Zareer
- Screenplay by: Ahmed Zareer; Mahdi Ahmed
- Produced by: Ahmed Shah; Hussain Munawwar
- Starring: Niuma Mohamed; Yoosuf Shafeeu; Zeenath Abbas; Abdulla Muaz; Fathimath Fareela
- Cinematography: Hassan Haleem
- Edited by: Ahmed Nimal; Ali Musthafa
- Music by: Hussain Sobah; Ayyuman Shareef
- Production company: Sunshine Production
- Release date: November 30, 2016
- Running time: 122 minutes
- Country: Maldives
- Language: Dhivehi

Vee Beyvafa is a 2016 Maldivian romantic film directed by Ibrahim Wisan. Produced by Ahmed Shah and Hussain Munawwar under Sunshine Production, the film stars Niuma Mohamed, Yoosuf Shafeeu, Zeenath Abbas, Abdulla Muaz and Fathimath Fareela in pivotal roles. The film was released on 18 October 2016.

== Cast ==
- Niuma Mohamed as Riyasha
- Yoosuf Shafeeu as Hassan Ziyad
- Zeenath Abbas as Shiuna
- Abdulla Muaz as Huzam
- Fathimath Fareela as Nisha
- Ajnaaz Ali as Faruhad

== Soundtrack ==
Track listing
No.	Title	Lyrics	Singer(s)	Length
1.	"Beynunvanee Themi Foavelan"	Mohamed Abdul Ghanee	Rafiyath Rameeza
2.	"Ufalaa Hithaamaigaa Vaanan Ekee"	Mohamed Abdul Ghanee	Ibrahim Zaid Ali, Aishath Maain Rasheed
3.	"Jaanaa Furaanain"	Mohamed Abdul Ghanee	Mumthaz Moosa, Mariyam Ashfa
4.	"Hithugaa Foruvifaa Yaara"	Mohamed Abdul Ghanee	Mohamed Abdul Ghanee

== Release ==
The film was released on 30 November 2016, five years after commencing pre-production. Upon release, the film received a negative response from critics. Ahmed Adhushan of Mihaaru concluded his review calling the film "a step backward" in the progress of cinema. He further criticised the screenplay by Zareer and Ahmed, and blamed its weak writing for the lack of character development.

== Accolades ==
Award	Category	Recipients	Result	Ref.
8th Gaumee Film Awards	Best Supporting Actress	Zeenath Abbas	Nominated	
