= Fathimath Rauf =

Maldivian singer

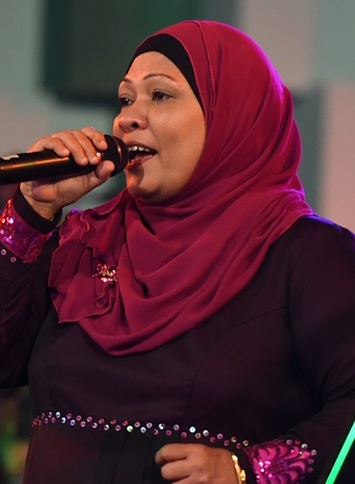
- Rauf performing at the Eid Kulhivaru Show, 2015
- Born: 7 October 1959 (age 66); Male', Maldives
- Occupation: Playback singer
- Years active: 1982–present
- Musical career
- Genres: Pop; filmi; electronic
- Instrument: Vocals
- Labels: Olympians

Fathimath Rauf (7 October 1959) is a Maldivian singer.

== Early life and career ==
Fathimath Rauf was born and raised in the "Masodi family" where several local artists emerged as prominent singers. At the age of thirteen, as insisted by her father, Rauf performed a song on the stage which caught the attention of the audience. Music directors realized her potential and roped in to sing for their projects which enabled her to "rise to fame" during her career beginning. While working at Dhivehi Raajjeyge Adu, she joined the local band "Olympians" and became a prominent face in their stage shows. With the inauguration of National Centre for the Arts, she joined the centre and served for the government till her retirement in August 2017.

In 1983, the Government of Maldives honoured her with the National Award of Recognition, which makes her the third female singer to receive this honour. Besides, she was bestowed with the first Gaumee Film Award for Best Female Playback Singer for her rendition of the fast-paced song "Loabin Ujaalaa" from the film Dhon Manma (1992). Her high-pitched rendition of the song "Oagaaverivey Loabivaa" from the film Amaanaaiy (1998) remains as one of the most iconic songs she has recorded. After contributing to the soundtrack album of Zuleykha with the song "Heevey Ladhugannahen", her voice was not heard in any further film releases where she reasoned it as "making path for the upcoming talented singers". However, she has frequently collaborated with the Olympians band and participated in several stage performances and lent her voice for few studio albums released afterwards.

== Discography ==
=== Feature film ===
Year	Film	Song	Lyricist(s)	Co-artist(s)
1982	Orchid – Eynaage Maa	"Reyrey Dhiwaanaa"		Ibrahim Hamdhee
1985	Fidhaa	"Kiyaadhey Mi Raagunney"	Yoosuf Mohamedfulhu	Abdul Hannan Moosa Didi
1989	Nufolhey Maa	"Uthureythee Kiyaadhey Mee Bayaaney"	Chilhiya Moosa Manik	Abdul Hannan Moosa Didi
1992	Dhon Manma	"Loabin Ujaalaa"		Solo
1998	Amaanaaiy	"Amaanaaiy"	Aminath Faiza (Deyzeemaa)	Solo
1998	Amaanaaiy	"Jawahir"	Ahmed Sharumeel	Solo
1998	Amaanaaiy	"Oagaaverivey Loabivey"	Mausoom Shakir	Umar Zahir
2000	Saahibaa	"Kiyaadhevuneemaa Haal"	Ahmed Sharumeel	Ali Rameez
2001	Aaah	"Hingi Haadhisaain"		Solo
2001	Aaah	"Veynugaa Roalumun"		Abdul Baaree
2001	Dheevaanaa	"Loabiveema Vaagothey"	Mariyam Waheedha	Ahmed Falah
2001	Naaummeedhu	"Oagaavee Hithakun"	Boi Ahmed Khaleel	Umar Zahir
2002	Loabi Nuvevununama	"Loabin Magey Hiy"	Mausoom Shakir	Hassan Ilham
2002	Sandhuravirey	"Hithuga Loabin Kalaaey"	Ahmed Haleem	Ali Rameez
2002	Kahvalhah Dhaandhen	"Nan Kalaage Hama Eba Liyevey"		Ibrahim Rameez
2002	Kahvalhah Dhaandhen	"Alivaa Alivaa Nooru"		Mohamed Huzam
2002	Aan... Aharenves Loabivin	"Liyefaa Vamey Hithugaa Thinan"	Mausoom Shakir	Mohamed Huzam
2002	Aan... Aharenves Loabivin	"Baakee Vumun Hiyy"	Mausoom Shakir	Mukhthar Adam
2003	Kalaayaanulaa	"Neyndhen Vakivaakah"	Mausoom Shakir	Ibrahim Rameez
2003	Edhi Edhi Hoadheemey	"Dhila Hoonugaa"	Kopee Mohamed Rasheed	Abdul Hannan Moosa Didi
2005	Zuleykha	"Heevey Ladhugannahen"	Mausoom Shakir	Hassan Ilham
2024	Udhabaani 2	"Keiynuvaavaru Loabin Magey Hiyy"	Ismail Mubarik	Hassan Ilham

=== Television ===
Year	Title	Song	Lyricist(s)	Co-artist(s)
1995	Malakaa	"Vaareyaa Rey Han'dhaanun"	Ahmed Sharumeel	Solo
1998-1999	Aisha	"Roan Roanveehey Alhey"	Jaufar Abdul Rahuman	Mukhthar Adam
2001	Aniyaa	"Khiyaaluga Foni Foni"	Annaarumaa Rasheedh	Ali Rameez
2003	Dheewanaa Hiyy	"Thiya Khiyaalu Aalaa Vanee Ey"	Easa Shareef	Hassan Ilham
2005	Kalaage Haqqugaa	"Veynaa Udhaahaa"	Adam Haleem Adhnan	Mumthaz Moosa

=== Non-film songs ===
Year	Album/single	Song	Lyricist(s)	Co-artist(s)
1982	Single	"Beynunveemaa Loabinney"	Hussain Rasheedh	Solo
N/A	Single	"Kiyaadhevvavaashey"		Ibrahim Hamdhee
N/A	Single	"Dhin Mi Ummeedhugaa Rey"	Yoosuf Mohamedfulhu	Solo
N/A	Single	"Thedheh Bunedheythoa"		Ibrahim Shakeeb
N/A	Single	"Mee Eveylaa Zaatheke Heylaa"		Ibrahim Shakeeb
N/A	Single	"Veeyey Veeyey Veeyey"		Ibrahim Shakeeb
N/A	Single	"Gisli Eyruge Khiyaal Kiyaa"		Solo
N/A	Single	"Dheynee Fakhuru Loaiybaa Qadharu"		Solo
N/A	Single	"Ruhevey Abeerun Mey Furi Araanee"		Solo
N/A	Single	"Hoadhaa Beleeme Dhuniyeyn"	Kashimaa Ahmed Shakir	Solo
N/A	Single	"Hin'gaa Hin'gaa Dhenvee Balaan"		Solo
N/A	Single	"Akhuney Zuvaanee Rivethi Malakee"		Solo
N/A	Single	"Balaashe Dheyshe Dhen"		Abdul Hannan Moosa Didi
N/A	Single	"Hiyy Dhoa Gulhuneeyey"	Yoosuf Mohamedfulhu	Abdul Hannan Moosa Didi
N/A	Single	"Nan Edhunee Hoadhaalan"		Umar Zahir
N/A	Single	"Thuraa Dhinee Veynaa"		Solo
N/A	Single	"Kaakuhey Dheynee Rahum"	Abdul Hannan Moosa Didi	Solo
N/A	Single	"Fakhuruveri Mi Eidhuge Thahaanee"		Abdul Hannan Moosa Didi, Shafeeqa Abdul Latheef, Mahumoodha Shakeeb
1987	DIB – 1	"Edheythee Chaandhaneemaathoa"	Ibrahim Mansoor	Abdul Hannan Moosa Didi
1989	Galaxyge Therein	"Hiyy Meygaa Vaathee"	Yoosuf Mohamedfulhu	Abdul Hannan Moosa Didi
1989	Galaxyge Therein	"Fun Asaru Kuri Fun Asaru"	Yoosuf Mohamedfulhu	Abdul Hannan Moosa Didi
1991	Galaxyge Therein 2	"Kaaku Aimaahe"	Yoosuf Mohamedfulhu	Solo
1991	Galaxyge Therein 2	"Hoadhey Hoadhey Yaaru Hoadhey"		Imaadh Ismail
1991	Galaxyge Therein 2	"Evee Gothekey"		Imaadh Ismail
1991	Galaxyge Therein 2	"Loaiybah Magey Oiy Ithubaaru"	Abdulla Sodhiq	Abdul Hannan Moosa Didi
1991	Galaxyge Therein 2	"Hithuga Vaathee Veemey Fidhaa"	Abdul Hannan Moosa Didi	Abdul Hannan Moosa Didi
1992	Galaxyge Therein 3	"Annaashey Kalaa"		Abdul Raoof
1992	Galaxyge Therein 3	"Vaareyaa Rey Han'dhaanun"	Ahmed Sharumeel	Solo
1992	Galaxyge Therein 3	"Magey Hithakee Faraqu Neydhey"		Solo
1992	Galaxyge Therein 3	"Dhin Veynugaa Hithaa"		Solo
1992	Galaxyge Therein 3	"Vaareyge Paree"		Ibrahim Shakeeb
1992	Galaxyge Therein 3	"Govaalee Kaaku Kaaku"		Ibrahim Shakeeb
1992	Galaxyge Therein 3	"Dheyshey Thaazaa Khiyaalu"		Ibrahim Shakeeb
1992	Galaxyge Therein 3	"Loaiybey Loaiybaa Fidhaavegen"		Abdul Hannan Moosa Didi
1992	Chance	"Loabin Ujaalaa Kuri Yaarakee"		Solo
1993	Galaxyge Therein 4	"Fenigenne Neyvaa Haahey Vee"		Abdul Raoof
1993	Galaxyge Therein 4	"Loabeege Feshunthaa Dhoa"		Abdul Raoof
1993	Galaxyge Therein 4	"Eki Ummeedhu Dheefa Inthizaaru"		Abdul Raoof
1993	Galaxyge Therein 4	"Reyrey Dheewaanaa Vee"		Ibrahim Shakeeb
1993	Galaxyge Therein 4	"Kuranveehe Mehefil Ujaalaa"		Solo
1994	Galaxyge Therein 5	"Dhen Mee Roohu Dhirey"		Ibrahim Shakeeb
1994	Galaxyge Therein 5	"Barubaadhuvee Hayaathey"		Solo
1998	Foni Karuna	"Niyaa Meeyey"		Solo
1999	Farumaan	"Fun Khiyaalu Hithaa Kulheleeyey"		Imaadh Ismail
1999	Farumaan	"Seedhaa E Hiyaa Libey"	Tharaboozu Ahmed Riza	Abdul Hannan Moosa Didi
1999	Farumaan	"Amunaalevey Mee Lafuzey"	Ahmed Sharumeel	Abdul Hannan Moosa Didi
1999	Raaya	"Alathu Dhee Loabivevun"		Solo
1999	Rahmedhu	"Roan Roanveehey Alhey"	Jaufar Abdul Rahuman	Mukhthar Adam
1999	Vara	"Konme Kameh Kohfaa"	Kopee Mohamed Rasheedh	Mohamed Huzam
2000	Dhoapattaa	"Nukuraashey Huree Dhen Thi Khiyaal"		Solo
2000	Gumree	"Aawaaraavey Fenigen"		Ibrahim Amir
2000	Hamaroalhi	"Leykarunaey Neeraalanee"	Kopee Mohamed Rasheedh	Hassan Ilham
2000	Laat	"Hoadhan Edhey Misraabuhey"	Abdulla Afeef	Solo
2000	Namaves	"Mendhan Veemaa Dhuniye"	Easa Shareef	Ali Rameez
2000	Namaves	"Aalam Mirey Loabeegaa"	Easa Shareef	Ali Rameez
2000	Namaves	"Konthaakubaa Ey Han'dhu Vanee"	Easa Shareef	Mohamed Huzam
2000	Nihaa	"Khiyaalee Vaafashun Ban'dhevenee"	Easa Shareef	Abdul Hannan Moosa Didi
2000	Nihaa	"Reyge Mendhan Vaan Fesheemaa"		Ali Rameez
2001	Aimina	"Khiyaaluga Foni Foni"	Mohamed Rasheedh (Annaarey)	Ali Rameez
2001	Aimina	"Kalaa Heekuranee"	Mohamed Rasheedh (Annaarey)	Abdul Baaree
2001	Baaodi	"Dhaanamey Dhaanamey"		Hussain Sobah
2001	Baaodi	"Hureveyey Thiya Khiyaaluga Loabin"		Ahmed Sobah
2001	Fattaru	"Reyreygaa Ekaniveemaa"	Ismail Shakeeb	Solo
2001	Fattaru	"Nudhaashey Thihen Yaaraa Rulhin"	Ismail Shakeeb	Hassan Ilham
2001	Haasil	"Dheewaanaa Nuvey Ey Hithaa"		Solo
2001	Reyfanaa	"Mulhi Jaanaa Roohaa Fidhaavegen"		Mohamed Ahmed (Dokey)
2001	Saamaraa	"Nidheemaa Govaalaathoa"		Solo
2001	Saamaraa	"Ishqee Dheewaanaa Nazaru"		Solo
2001	Saamaraa	"Aan Fun Asaru"		Massoodh Moosa Didi
2001	Saamaraa	"Dhen Mi Kiyaaladheebalaa"		Mohamed Rashad
2001	Shoakh	"Zuvaan Hitheh Mi Meygavey"	Ahmed Sharumeel	Abdul Baaree
2002	Single	"Nuveeyey Hiyy Ufaa"		Solo
2002	Abaarana	"Dhehithun Mi Loabivaathee"		Solo
2002	Abaarana	"Yaaraa Edheyhen Dhoa"		Imaadh Ismail
2002	Dhanvaru	"Nulame Thiya Loabi Oyaa"	Ahmed Nashidh (Dharavandhoo)	Hassan Ilham
2002	Paruvaana	"Nan Kalaage Hama Eba Liyevey"		Ibrahim Rameez
2002	Paruvaana	"Dhen Neydhen Kuran Inthizaaru"	Easa Shareef	Abdul Baaree
2002	Himeyn Dhuniye	"Liyefaa Vamey Hithugaa Thinan"	Mausoom Shakir	Mohamed Huzam
2002	Himeyn Dhuniye	"Baakeevumun Hiyy"	Mausoom Shakir	Mukhthar Adam
2002	Hithuge Loabi	"Neyngi Mi Vaarey Themuneemaa Dhoa"		Solo
2002	Raiyvilaa	"Libi Libi Ishqee Loabithaa"		Abdul Raoof
2003	Hiyy Roavarun	"Hihchaa Veynaa"		Solo
2003	Loabi Loabin	"Chaalu Chaalu Moonaa"	Ahmed Saleem (Salle)	Loosiyan Abdul Rahuman
2003	Loabi Loabin	"Vindhugaa Hithuge Mivanee Kalaa"	Ahmed Saleem (Salle)	Hassan Ilham
2003	Han'dhaan	"Magey Rasreethi Rankamanaa"		Ibrahim Shakeeb
2003	Qaumee Lava: Vol. 1	"Thiya Zaeemah"		Solo
2003	Saamaraa 3	"Nanve Ilzaamuge Insaafu"		Solo
2004	Hooru	"Dhuruvumeh Neydhemey Loamathin"		Mukhthar Adam
2004	Maamuige Reythah	"Beeveema Kalaa"	Abdul Hameedh	Solo
2004	Ehan'dhaanugai...	"Naa E Dhathuru"		Solo
2005	Hithun Hithah	"Hithaa Jaanaa"	Ahmed Haleem	Loosiyan Abdul Rahuman
2005	Ulhe Ulhefa	"Ulhe Ulhefa"	Ahmed Nashidh (Dharavandhoo)	Mumthaz Moosa
2005	Yaaraa 2	"Ey Gomaa"	Ahmed Nashidh (Dharavandhoo)	Abdul Baaree
2005	Single	"Ehan'dhaaney Kuraanee Thaa Abadhah"		Mumthaz Moosa
2005	Single	"Ehan'dhaan Hithun Filaane Gotheh"		Mohamed Farhad
2006	Kisthee	"Noorey Thiyey"		Mumthaz Moosa
2006	Kisthee	"Noorey Thiyey" (Remix Version)		Mumthaz Moosa
2006	Kisthee	"Karunun Dheloa Vee Furifaa"		Hassan Ilham
2006	Mihithun	"Roalhi Jehilaa Gothun"	Hafsa Ali	Mohamed Huzam
2008	Hiyy Dheewaanaa 4	"Lolugaavaa Thiya Jaadhoo"	Shareefa Fakhry	Hassan Ilham
2009	Adhives... Loabivey	"Dhen Mihiyyves Nuroaney"		Solo
2009	Hiyy Furendhen	"Vindhaa, Meygaavaa Thee"		Mohamed Farhad
2013	Qaumee Dhuvas 1434	"Akhlaaq"		Various Artists
2021	Soba With Tharin: Fathimath Raoof	"Aavee Khiyaalakun"		Hussain Sobah
2021	Soba With Tharin: Fathimath Raoof	"Haadha Ujaalaa Moonekey Thee"		Hussain Sobah
2021	Soba With Tharin: Fathimath Raoof	"Kaiveneege Amaazu Kamugaa"	Aminath Faiza (Deyzeemaa)	Hussain Sobah
2021	Soba With Tharin: Fathimath Raoof	"Saafu Loabi Veemey"		Hussain Sobah
2021	Soba With Tharin: Fathimath Raoof	"Vindhaa, Meygaavaa Thee"		Hussain Sobah
2021	Soba With Tharin: Fathimath Raoof	"Maathakeh Mithaa Vanee"		Solo
2022	Single	"Edhey Loabi Heelun"	Mohamed Fazeen	Mohamed Fazeen
2022	Single	"Fennan Fesheemaa"	Abdulla Sodhiq	Mohamed Fazeen
2023	Single	"Loabin Yaaraa Dhaanamey Buney"	Mohamed Didi	Mohamed Fazeen
2024	Single	"Hiyy Zakham Zakham"	Abdulla Afeef	Mohamed Fazeen

=== Religious / Madhaha ===
Year	Album/single	Madhaha	Lyricist(s)	Co-artist(s)
—N/a	—N/a	"Yaa Rasoolullah"		Solo
2019	Aalam	"Leyaa Leyge Gulhumee"	Easa Shareef	Mumthaz Moosa, Hassan Aahil
2019	Aalam	"Faalameke Elhunu Aakhirah"	Easa Shareef	Solo

== Accolades ==
Year	Award	Category	Nominated work	Result	Ref(s)
1983	National Award of Recognition	Performing Arts - Singing		Won	
1995	1st Gaumee Film Awards	Best Female Playback Singer	"Loabin Ujaalaa" - Dhon Manma	Won	
