= Hithey Dheymee =

- Official film poster
- Directed by: Amjad Ibrahim
- Written by: Aminath Rinaza
- Screenplay by: Amjad Ibrahim
- Produced by: Hussain Ibrahim; Ali Ibrahim; Amjad Ibrahim
- Starring: Amira Ismail; Hussain Solah; Ali Ahmed; Fathimath Azifa; Aminath Shareef
- Cinematography: Hussain Shibau; Hassan Haleem; Shuaau; Ibrahim Wisan; Ali Rasheed; Ali Ibrahim; Moomin Fuad
- Edited by: Ahmed Latheef; Ahmed Asim
- Music by: Songs: Hussain Sobah; Score: Muaviyath Anwar
- Production companies: V Stream; Farivaa Films
- Release date: April 20, 2011
- Country: Maldives
- Language: Dhivehi

Hithey Dheymee is a 2011 Maldivian drama film directed by Amjad Ibrahim. Produced by Hussain Ibrahim, Ali Ibrahim and Amjad Ibrahim under Farivaa Films, the film stars Amira Ismail, Hussain Solah, Ali Ahmed, Fathimath Azifa and Aminath Shareef in pivotal roles. The film was released on 20 April 2011.

== Premise ==
Nadheema, a school teacher marries the only son from a wealthy family, Hisham (Hussain Solah) despite his mother's disapproval since Nadheema is from a middle-class family. Upon discovering their relationship, Ahmed (Ali Ahmed), the best friend of Hisham and who is secretly in love with Nadheema is heartbroken. When Nadheema gets pregnant, they bring a maid, Shifa (Fathimath Azifa) to help them with their responsibilities. Complications arise when his mother plots against Nadheema and Hisham has a secret affair with Shifa.

== Cast ==
- Amira Ismail as Nadheema
- Hussain Solah as Hisham
- Ali Ahmed as Ahmed
- Fathimath Azifa as Shifa
- Aminath Shareef as Fareedha
- Ali Shameel as Shameel
- Fauziyya Hassan as Shakeela
- Nadhiya Hassan as Shaza
- Mariyam Shahuzaa as Fazeena
- Nashidha Mohamed as Rish

== Soundtrack ==
Track listing
No.	Title	Lyrics	Music	Singer(s)	Length
1.	"Hithey Dheymee"	Mohamed Abdul Ghanee	Hussain Sobah	Rafiyath Rameeza, Mohamed Farhad
2.	"Hithey Dheymee" (Slow Version)	Mohamed Abdul Ghanee	Hussain Sobah	Rafiyath Rameeza, Mohamed Farhad
3.	"Vey Kalaa Furaanaigaa"	Mohamed Abdul Ghanee	Hussain Sobah	Rafiyath Rameeza, Mohamed Farhad
4.	"Huvafenthakey Dhekkee Kalaa"	Easa Shareef	Hussain Sobah	Abdul Hannan Moosa Didi
5.	"Saafu Nayaa Han'dhuvaru"	Mohamed Abdul Ghanee	Hussain Sobah	Mumthaz Moosa, Rafiyath Rameeza
