= Hithuge Edhun =

2006 Maldivian film

- Official film poster
- Directed by: Amjad Ibrahim
- Written by: Mariyam Moosa
- Screenplay by: Amjad Ibrahim
- Produced by: Mohamed Abdulla
- Starring: Niuma Mohamed; Mohamed Manik; Sheela Najeeb; Mohamed Shavin
- Cinematography: Shaniz
- Edited by: Ahmed Shah
- Music by: Mohamed Ahmed
- Production company: Dhekedheke Ves Production
- Release date: 1 May 2006
- Country: Maldives
- Language: Dhivehi

Hithuge Edhun is a 2006 Maldivian romantic drama film directed by Amjad Ibrahim. Produced by Mohamed Abdulla under Dhekedheke Ves Productions, the film stars Niuma Mohamed, Mohamed Manik, Sheela Najeeb and Mohamed Shavin in pivotal roles.

== Cast ==
- Niuma Mohamed as Shaniya
- Mohamed Manik as Shahil
- Sheela Najeeb as Nisha
- Mohamed Shavin as Nahid
- Mohamed Vishan Aboobakuru as Idan
- Ahmed Aiham Ali
- Mariyam Siyadha as Jeeza
- Nadhiya Hassan as Sofi
- Mariyam Haleem as Wakleedha; Shaniya's mother
- Ali Farooq as Mohamed; Shaniya's father
- Hussain Nooradeen as Shahil's friend
- Mariyam Shahuza as Idan's teacher
- Zeenath Abbas (Special appearance)

== Soundtrack ==
Track listing
No.	Title	Lyrics	Singer(s)	Length
1.	"Veynee Udhaas"	Ahmed Nashidh (Dharavandhoo)	Aishath Inaya
2.	"Magey Loabivaaey"	Adam Haleem Adnan	Fathimath Zoona
3.	"Bappaaey Adu Ahaashey"	Adam Haleem Adnan	Andhala Haleem
4.	"Haadha Ufaa Ihsaas Vey"	Ahmed Nashidh (Dharavandhoo)	Mumthaz Moosa, Aishath Inaya
5.	"Thaubaa Vamey"	Adam Haleem Adnan	Mumthaz Moosa
6.	"Finifini Vaareyey"	Ahmed Nashidh (Dharavandhoo)	Mumthaz Moosa, Lahfa Faiz

== Accolades ==
Year	Award	Category	Recipients	Result	Ref.
2008	5th Gaumee Film Awards	Best Actor	Mohamed Manik	Nominated	
2008	5th Gaumee Film Awards	Best Actress	Niuma Mohamed	Nominated	
2008	5th Gaumee Film Awards	Best Supporting Actress	Sheela Najeeb	Nominated	
2008	5th Gaumee Film Awards	Best Female Playback Singer	Fathimath Zoona - "Magey Loabivaaey"	Won	
2008	5th Gaumee Film Awards	Best Lyricist	Ahmed Nashid - "Veynee Udhaas"	Won	
