= E Bappa =

2011 film directed by Yoosuf Shafeeu

- Official film poster
- Directed by: Yoosuf Shafeeu
- Written by: Yoosuf Shafeeu; Koyya Hassan Manik
- Produced by: Koyya Hassan Manik
- Starring: Yoosuf Shafeeu; Sheela Najeeb; Amira Ismail; Fathimath Fareela; Koyya Hassan Manik; Mohamed Manik
- Cinematography: Ibrahim Moosa
- Edited by: Yoosuf Shafeeu
- Music by: Songs: Mohamed Ahmed; Score: Ayyuman Shareef
- Production companies: Lantern Production; Eupe Productions
- Release date: 31 May 2011
- Running time: 120 minutes
- Country: Maldives
- Language: Dhivehi

E Bappa is a 2011 Maldivian family drama directed by Yoosuf Shafeeu. Produced by Koyya Hassan Manik under Lantern Production, the film stars Yoosuf Shafeeu, Sheela Najeeb, Amira Ismail, Fathimath Fareela, Koyya Hassan Manik and Mohamed Manik in pivotal roles. The film was released on 31 May 2011. Upon release, the film received mixed to negative reviews from critics and was considered a box office failure.

== Premise ==
Hassan (Koyya Hassan Manik) successfully lands a job as a sailor and considering his financial insecurities, leaves his three children and wife, Atheefa (Mariyam Shakeela) to return after few years when he is financially stable. After his departure, Atheefa prostituted herself and abandons her children. Realizing his grave mistake, Hassan divorces Atheefa and is forced to separate the children where he looked after his only daughter, Sheeza (Amira Ismail) and his friend, Adamfulhu took care of his two sons, Liyaz (Yoosuf Shafeeu) and Iyaz (Lufshan Shakeeb). Years later, Atheefa returns to the family and starts brainwashing her children and in-laws while bad-mouthing about their father. Atheefa and Liyaz's wife (Sheela Najeeb) conspire to throw Hassan out of the house when an accident resulted in him being handicapped.

== Cast ==
- Yoosuf Shafeeu as Liyaz
- Sheela Najeeb as Sabeehaa
- Amira Ismail as Sheeza
- Fathimath Fareela as Mazeena
- Koyya Hassan Manik as Hassan
- Mohamed Manik as Yooshau
- Mariyam Shakeela as Atheefa
- Lufshan Shakeeb as Iyaz
- Roanu Hassan Manik as Mazeena's father
- Maajidha as Nadheema
- Ali Shameel as Sheeza's step-father (Special appearance)
- Mariyam Haleem as Mariyam (Special appearance)
- Reeko Moosa Manik as Moosa (Special appearance)
- Mohamed Rasheed as Adhurey (Special appearance)
- Abdulla Naseer as Alibe (Special appearance)
- Mubarak Mohamed Abdulla as ahmed (Special appearance)

== Soundtrack ==
Track listing
No.	Title	Lyrics	Music	Singer(s)	Length
1.	"Bappa Ekey"	Mohamed Abdul Ghanee	Mohamed Ahmed (Kokko)	Mohamed Abdul Ghanee	05:14
2.	"Moosun Mi Reethi Bahaarey"		Mohamed Ahmed (Kokko)	Hassan Ilham, Aishath Maain Rasheed	06:21
3.	"Ulhe Ulhe Gaimuvee" (Duet Version)		Mohamed Ahmed (Kokko)	Mumthaz Moosa, Rafiyath Rameeza	04:06
4.	"Keevvebaa?"		Mohamed Ahmed (Kokko)	Aishath Maain Rasheed	05:04
5.	"Kaaku Alhaalee"		Mohamed Ahmed (Kokko)	Hassan Ilham	05:29
6.	"Thee Loabi Manzil"		Mohamed Ahmed (Kokko)	Shaheedha Riffath	06:09
7.	"Ulhe Ulhe Gaimuvee" (Solo Version)		Mohamed Ahmed (Kokko)	Mumthaz Moosa	04:11
Total length:					36:37
