= Ahmed Falah =

Maldivian filmmaker

- Born: Ahmed Falah; 25 July 1975 (age 50); Kaashidhoo, Maldives
- Occupations: Musician, Maldivian singer, film director, screenwriter, poet and vocalist
- Years active: 1990–present
- Spouse: Mariyam Nashfa

Ahmed Falah (Dhivehi: އަޙްމަދު ފަލާޙް; born 1975) is a Maldivian singer, musician, film director, screenwriter/ scriptwriter, songwriter, lyricist and poet. He won the Best Director Award in 2011 for Fageeru Koe in Maldives Film Awards 2011. He won the Best Melodition in 2008 in "Miadhu Crystal Awards 2008". He also won first place at the Maldivian Icon in 2009.

== Filmography ==
Year	Film	Director	Screenplay	Notes
2007	Haa Shaviyani Rasgefaanu 1	Yes	Yes	
2007	Bunyey Bunyey		Yes	
2007	Haa Shaviyani Rasgefaanu 2	Yes	Yes	
2007	Farihibe 1	Yes	Yes	
2007	Hiyy Ekaniveemaa	Yes	Yes	
2007	Haa Shaviyani Rasgefaanu 3	Yes	Yes	
2007	Handi Kujjaa	Yes	Yes	
2008	Vathukiba	Yes	Yes	Actor
2008	Haa Shaviyani Rasgefaanu 4	Yes	Yes	
2008	Farihibe 2	Yes	Yes	
2008	Faqeeru Koe	Yes	Yes	Gaumee Film Award for Best Director - Short Film
2009	Dhanna Nudhanna	Yes	Yes	
2010	Dhanna Nudhanna 2	Yes	Yes	
2011	Farihibe 3		Yes	
2011	Bodu 13 Muassasaa	Yes	Yes	
2011	Siyaasee Vaccine		Yes	
2012	13 Ah Visnaa Dhehaas		Yes	
2013	Farihibe 4		Yes	
2013	Siyaasee Koalhun		Yes	

== Discography ==
=== Feature Film ===
Year	Film	Song	Lyricist(s)	Co-Artist(s)
2001	Dheevaanaa	"Loabiveemaa Vaagothey"	Mariyam Waheedha	Fathimath Rauf
2003	Araamagu Dhonkamana	"Hiyy Nufilaaney"		Lahufa Faiz

=== Short film ===
Year	Film	Song	Lyricist(s)	Co-Artist(s)
2007	Farihibe 1	"Adi Neyngey Maakan'duga"	Ahmed Falah	Solo
2008	Farihibe 2	"Velaa Bis Alhan Dhaan"	Ahmed Falah	Solo
2008	Farihibe 2	"Gathiyyaa Thila Galun"	Ahmed Falah	Solo
2008	Farihibe 2	"Farihi Set"	Ahmed Falah	Mumthaz Moosa, Hassan Ilham, Mohamed Farhad
2008	Umurah Salaam	"Rihi Han'dhuvaru Dhey Reyreygaa"	Ahmed Falah	Mariyam Ashfa
2008	Vathukiba	"Vathukiba"	Ahmed Falah	Unknown
2011	Bodu 13 Muassasaa	"Baara Theyra Dhehaas Theyra"	Ahmed Falah	Solo
2011	Farihibe 3	"Thin Goh Dhun'buri"	Ahmed Falah	Solo
2013	Farihibe 4	"Ishqee Mihithugaa"	Ahmed Falah	Solo

=== Non-film songs ===
Year	Album	Song	Lyricist(s)	Co-Artist(s)
2002	Eynaa	"Kiyaaladhenhey Loabivefaa"	Ahmed Falah	Solo
2002	Eynaa	"Erey Finikan"	Ahmed Falah	Solo
2002	Eynaa	"Vindhu Loabin Jehi Hithehgaa" (Version 2)	Ahmed Falah	Solo
2003	Haalathu	"Beywafaatheriyaa Vaudheh Nuvanhey"	Ahmed Falah	Solo
2003	Haalathu	"Kehidheefa Kalaa Loabeegaa"	Ahmed Falah	Solo
2003	Haalathu	"Beynunvumun Loabeegaa"	Ahmed Falah	Solo
2003	Haalathu	"Ithubaaru Thiya Loabeegaa"	Ahmed Falah	Solo
2003	Haalathu	"Hayaathehge Feshumaa Nimun"	Ahmed Falah	Solo
2003	Haalathu	"Wafaatherive Loabin"	Ahmed Falah	Solo
2003	Haalathu	"Reethi Reethi Raanee"	Ahmed Falah	Solo
2007	Hiyy Beynumey	"Hithun Hithah Dhin Loabi Kalaa"	Ahmed Falah	Solo
2007	Hiyy Beynumey	"Haadha Loabivey"	Ahmed Falah	Solo
2007	Hiyy Beynumey	"Reethi Raanee Hiyy Edhey"	Ahmed Falah	Solo
2008	Waqth	"Keehvehey Loabi Dheegen"	Ahmed Falah	Solo
2008	Waqth	"Ma Heeves Nukuramey Kalaa"	Ahmed Falah	Solo
2008	Waqth	"Mihithey Veynugaa"	Ahmed Falah	Solo
2008	Waqth	"Nan Dhulun Kiyan Hiyy Edhey"	Ahmed Falah	Solo
2008	Waqth	"Oagaatheriyekey Kalaa Thee"	Ahmed Falah	Solo
2008	Waqth	"Reethi Moonaa Dheloa"	Ahmed Falah	Solo
2008	Waqth	"Waqth Dhuniyeygaa En'buri Dhiyumun"	Ahmed Falah	Solo
2008	Waqth	"Aharenge Hiyy Kalaayah Dhinee"	Ahmed Falah	Solo
2008	Waqth	"Dhulun Kalaa"	Ahmed Falah	Solo

=== As A Lyricist ===
==== Feature Film ====
Year	Film	Song	Co-Artist(s)
2009	Hiyy Rohvaanulaa	"Hiyy Rohvaanulaashey"	Mumthaz Moosa
2009	Hiyy Rohvaanulaa	"Ufaavey Kalaa Fenumun"	Ibrahim Zaid Ali, Mariyam Ashfa

==== Short film ====
Year	Film	Song	Co-Artist(s)
2007	Farihibe 1	"Aniyaage Handharakaa"	Mohamed Farhad
2007	Farihibe 1	"Kuredhi Lakudin"	Mohamed Farhad
2007	Farihibe 1	"Kihineh Jaanaa Mihithah Mivanee"	Mumthaz Moosa
2007	Farihibe 1	"Kalhirava Thooney Nooney"	Hassan Ilham
2007	Farihibe 1	"Adi Neyngey Maakan'duga"	Ahmed Falah
2007	Bunyey Bunyey	"Bunyey Bunyey"	Mohamed Farhad, Hussain Sobah
2007	Haa Shaviyani Rasgefaanu	"Alifu Abafili"	Mohamed Farhad
2007	Haa Shaviyani Rasgefaanu	"Kon Akureh"	Mohamed Farhad
2007	Haa Shaviyani Rasgefaanu	"Sukun Akuruthah"	Mohamed Farhad
2007	Haa Shaviyani Rasgefaanu	"Nameh Veyey"	Mohamed Farhad
2007	Haa Shaviyani Rasgefaanu	"Haa Shaviyani Nooru Raa"	Andhala Haleem (Anya)
2007	Hiyy Ekaniveemaa	"Hiyy Ekaniveemaa"	Mohamed Farhad
2008	Faqeeru Koe	"Hadi Fanuge Dhan'di Jifuti"	Ibrahim Zaid Ali
2008	Farihibe 2	"Velaa Bis Alhan Dhaan"	Ahmed Falah
2008	Farihibe 2	"Gathiyyaa Thila Galun"	Ahmed Falah
2008	Farihibe 2	"Kilan'bu Koarehge Fengan'du"	Mumthaz Moosa
2008	Farihibe 2	"Valhi Reethi Vaanee"	Abdulla Naashif (Thaathi)
2008	Farihibe 2	"Aniyaage Buradhan Hifaigen"	Mohamed Farhad
2008	Farihibe 2	"Farihi Set"	Mumthaz Moosa, Hassan Ilham, Mohamed Farhad
2008	Umurah Salaam	"Rihi Han'dhuvaru Dhey Reyreygaa"	Mariyam Ashfa
2008	Vathukiba	"Vathukiba"	Ahmed Falah
2011	Bodu 13 Muassasaa	"Baara Theyra Dhehaas Theyra"	Ahmed Falah
2011	Farihibe 3	"Maakan'duge Adiah"	Mukhthar Adam
2011	Farihibe 3	"Gaidhuru Nukiyaa"	Mumthaz Moosa
2011	Farihibe 3	"Udhuhi Dhoonifulhu"	Ibrahim Zaid Ali
2011	Farihibe 3	"Thin Goh Dhun'buri"	Ahmed Falah
2011	Farihibe 3	"Hatharu Kan'du"	Abdulla Naashif (Thaathi)
2011	Siyaasee Vaccine	"Siyaasee Vaccine"	Ibrahim Zaid Ali, Mohamed Abdul Ghanee, Majeedh Ismail
2012	13 Ah Visnaa Dhehaas	"13 Ah Visnaa Dhehaas"	Ibrahim Zaid Ali, Mohamed Abdul Ghanee
2013	Farihibe 4	"Fariyah Folhey Reethi"	Abdulla Naashif (Thaathi)
2013	Farihibe 4	"Riyaleh Nagan"	Mohamed Abdul Ghanee
2013	Farihibe 4	"Dhun Elhi Fariyaa"	Ibrahim Zaid Ali
2013	Farihibe 4	"Mahuroomuvee Alhugan'du"	Mumthaz Moosa
2013	Farihibe 4	"Ishqee Mihithugaa"	Ahmed Falah
2013	Siyaasee Koalhun	"Siyaasee Koalhun"	Ibrahim Zaid Ali, Mohamed Abdul Ghanee

==== Non-film songs ====
Year	Album	Song	Co-Artist(s)
2002	Eynaa	"Vindhu Loabin Jehi Hithehgaa" (Version 1)	Ali Rameez
2002	Eynaa	"Kiyaaladhenhey Loabivefaa"	Ahmed Falah
2002	Eynaa	"Erey Finikan"	Ahmed Falah
2002	Eynaa	"Vindhu Loabin Jehi Hithehgaa" (Version 2)	Ahmed Falah
2003	Haalathu	"Beywafaatheriyaa Vaudheh Nuvanhey"	Ahmed Falah
2003	Haalathu	"Kehidheefa Kalaa Loabeegaa"	Ahmed Falah
2003	Haalathu	"Beynunvumun Loabeegaa"	Ahmed Falah
2003	Haalathu	"Ithubaaru Thiya Loabeegaa"	Ahmed Falah
2003	Haalathu	"Hayaathehge Feshumaa Nimun"	Ahmed Falah
2003	Haalathu	"Wafaatherive Loabin"	Ahmed Falah
2003	Haalathu	"Reethi Reethi Raanee"	Ahmed Falah
2007	Hiyy Beynumey	"Hiyy Beynumey Dhulun"	Mumthaz Moosa
2007	Hiyy Beynumey	"Faruvaa Thiya Athun Noonee"	Mumthaz Moosa
2007	Hiyy Beynumey	"Hiyy Haraamey"	Abdulla Waheedh (Waddey)
2007	Hiyy Beynumey	"Hithun Hithah Dhin Loabi Kalaa"	Ahmed Falah
2007	Hiyy Beynumey	"Haadha Loabivey"	Ahmed Falah
2007	Hiyy Beynumey	"Reethi Raanee Hiyy Edhey"	Ahmed Falah
2007	Hiyy Beynumey	"Loabeege Raasthaa"	Ahmed Falah, Aishath Inaya, Hussain Sobah
2007	Hiyy Beynumey	"Dhulaa Hiyy Leygaa"	Adam Jinaah
2007	Hiyy Beynumey	"Hiyy Ekaniveemaa"	Mohamed Farhad
2008	Hiyy Sihenee	"Hiyy Sihenee"	Mohamed Abdul Ghanee, Mariyam Ashfa
2008	Kalaa Haadha Loaiybey	"I'm In Love"	Mohamed Farhad, Rafiyath Rameeza
2008	Kalaa Haadha Loaiybey	"Mithuraage Mohabbathu Ufulaa"	Mumthaz Moosa, Shaheedha Mohamed
2008	Waqth	"Keehvehey Loabi Dheegen"	Ahmed Falah
2008	Waqth	"Ma Heeves Nukuramey Kalaa"	Ahmed Falah
2008	Waqth	"Mihithey Veynugaa"	Ahmed Falah
2008	Waqth	"Nan Dhulun Kiyan Hiyy Edhey"	Ahmed Falah
2008	Waqth	"Oagaatheriyekey Kalaa Thee"	Ahmed Falah
2008	Waqth	"Reethi Moonaa Dheloa"	Ahmed Falah
2008	Waqth	"Waqth Dhuniyeygaa En'buri Dhiyumun"	Ahmed Falah
2008	Waqth	"Aharenge Hiyy Kalaayah Dhinee"	Ahmed Falah
2008	Waqth	"Dhulun Kalaa"	Ahmed Falah

== Awards ==
Year	Award	Category	Nominated work	Result
2009	Maldivian Icon			Won
2011	1st Maldives Film Awards	Best Director - Short Film	Faqeeru Koe	Won
2014	3rd Maldives Film Awards	Best Screenplay - Short Film	Farihibe 4	Won
2014	3rd Maldives Film Awards	Best Screenplay - Short Film	Siyaasee Koalhun	Nominated
2014	3rd Maldives Film Awards	Best Screenplay - Short Film	13 Ah Visnaa Dhehaas	Nominated

- 2009: Maldivian Icon as a Singer
