= Edhuvas Hingajje =

1996 Maldivian film

Edhuvas Higajje
- Official film poster
- Directed by: Easa Shareef
- Screenplay by: Easa Shareef; Ibrahim
- Produced by: Aslam Rasheed
- Starring: Reeko Moosa Manik; Wadheefa; Nooma Ibrahim
- Cinematography: Ibrahim Moosa
- Edited by: Ibrahim Rafeeu; Mohamed Amsad
- Production company: Slam Studio
- Release date: 1996
- Country: Maldives
- Language: Dhivehi

Edhuvas Higajje is a 1996 Maldivian film directed by Easa Shareef. Produced by Aslam Rasheed under Slam Studio, the film stars Reeko Moosa Manik, Wadheefa Adam and Nooma Ibrahim in pivotal roles.

== Premise ==
The film opens with Wadheefa Adam (Wadheefa) spending sleepless nights desperately waiting for husband, Imran (Reeko Moosa Manik) who simply avoids her citing his busy schedule, though Imran is actually having an intimate relationship with his co-actor, Azma (Nooma Ibrahim). Blackmailed, Imran confesses to Wadheefa that he is having an affair with Azma, which leads him to choose between his acquiescent wife and vile girlfriend, in which he chooses the latter. Dejected, Wadheefa relocates to her island and resides at her friend's house. As demanded by Azma, Imran divorces Wadheefa. She meets a charmy guy named Waseem (Mohamed Aboobakuru) at a screen test where he expresses romantic feelings towards her. meanwhile, Azma suffers from hypochondriasis and seeks help from Wadheefa.

== Cast ==
- Reeko Moosa Manik as Imran
- Wadheefa Adam as Wadheefa
- Nooma Ibrahim as Azma
- Mohamed Aboobakuru as Waseem
- Mohamed Waheed as Mondhu
- Fathimath Didi as Azma's mother
- Chilhiya Moosa Manik as Kasimfulhu
- Azma as Shimana
- Aamina Fulhu as Aamina
- Niru as Baby Niru
- Ibrahim Wisan as Vishan

== Soundtrack ==
Track listing
No.	Title	Lyrics	Singer(s)	Length
1.	"Ma Edhey Ufaa Dheveyne"	Easa Shareef	Abdul Hannan Moosa Didi
2.	"Kalaa Aeemaa Handhaa Iru"	Easa Shareef	Abdul Hannan Moosa Didi

== Accolades ==
Year	Award	Category	Recipients	Result	Ref.
1996	Aafathis Awards - 1996	Best Supporting Actress	Nooma Ibrahim	Won	
2007	2nd Gaumee Film Awards	Best Makeup	Aishath Ali Manik	Won	
