= Loabi '90 =

- Official film poster
- Directed by: Easa Shareef
- Written by: Dhonannaaru Rasheed
- Screenplay by: Easa Shareef
- Produced by: Mohamed Saeed
- Starring: Asad Shareef; Mariyam Rasheedha; Khadheeja Adam; Fathimath Nizar; Easa Shareef
- Cinematography: Easa Shareef; Hussain Latheef; Ahmed Zaki; Ahmed Suja; Ali Amir
- Edited by: Easa Shareef
- Production company: D.H. Studio
- Release date: 1990
- Country: Maldives
- Language: Dhivehi

Loabi '90, also known as Love '90, is a 1990 Maldivian film written, edited and directed by Easa Shareef. Produced by Mohamed Saeed under D.H. Studio, the film stars Asad Shareef, Mariyam Rasheedha, Khadheeja Adam, Fathimath Nizar and Easa Shareef in pivotal roles.

== Premise ==
Zuhudha (Fathimath Nizar) is married to the school headmaster, Ashraf (Easa Shareef), and resides in S. Gan with her husband and his brother, Shihab (Asad Shareef). Shihab is known for his short temper and hyperactive nature, but he shares a close bond with Zuhudha. When Zuhudha's proud mother and her younger sister, Seema (Mariyam Rasheedha), visit them from Male', they are irritated by Shihab's behavior. As time passes, tensions rise, and Ashraf and Seema engage in harmful actions. Eventually, Ashraf becomes so infuriated with Shihab that he ejects him from the house. During this period, Seema starts developing feelings for Shihab.

Shihab heads to Male', where he is welcomed by Chilhiya Moosa Manik, who appreciates his empathy and kindness. Upon Manik's request, Shihab stays at his home until he becomes financially stable enough to live independently. While on his deathbed, Manik expresses his wish for Shihab to marry his daughter, Aashiya, a proposal that Shihab accepts. Shihab faces the challenges of poverty and takes on various unideal jobs to support him and Aashiya. During his work, Shihab crosses paths with Seema, who extends an invitation to her birthday party. Despite numerous obstacles, Seema is determined to win Shihab's heart while Aashiya longs for the love of Shihab too, leaving the difficult choice to Shihab.

== Cast ==
- Asad Shareef as Shihab
- Mariyam Rasheedha as Seema
- Khadheeja Adam as Aashiya
- Fathimath Nizar as Zuhudha
- Easa Shareef as Ashraf
- Chilhiya Moosa Manik as Aashiya's father
- Fathimath Didi as Fareedha; Seema's mother
- Ibrahim Rasheed as Wahid; Seema's father
- Dhonannaaru Rasheed as Ziyadh

== Soundtrack ==
Track listing
No.	Title	Lyrics	Singer(s)	Length
1.	"Hithuge Vindhey Avas Vedhanee"	Easa Shareef	Abdul Hannan Moosa Didi, Sofoora Khaleel
2.	"Loabeege Dhaairaain"	Easa Shareef	Massoodh Moosa Didi, Zahiyya Thaufeeq

== Reception ==
The film received mainly positive reviews from critics and praised Easa Shareef's contribution to the film. Calling the film a "perfect mix of Bollywood films", it was ranked second in the top 5 films directed by Shareef in a list compiled by Ahmed Adhushan from Mihaaru in 2021.
