= Emme Fahu Dhuvas =

- Official film poster
- Directed by: Easa Shareef
- Written by: Ibrahim Naeem
- Screenplay by: Easa; Ibbe; Moosa
- Produced by: Seven Private Limited
- Starring: Reeko Moosa Manik; Hassan Afeef; Niuma Mohamed; Mariyam Nazima
- Cinematography: Ibrahim Moosa; Ali Rasheed
- Edited by: Easa; Hussain
- Music by: Mohamed Ahmed
- Release date: 2000
- Country: Maldives
- Language: Dhivehi

Emme Fahu Dhuvas is a 2000 Maldivian drama film directed by Easa Shareef. Produced by Seven Private Limited, the film stars Reeko Moosa Manik, Hassan Afeef, Niuma Mohamed and Mariyam Nazima in pivotal roles.

== Premise ==
Haseena (Mariyam Nazima) who is engaged to B. Eydhafushi sport's club secretary Atheef, (Reeko Moosa Manik) relocates to Male' in order to master the skills of handicraft and fashion designing before the marriage. During her stay in Male', Shahid is smitten by Haseena's beauty. Shahid's best-friend Azeeza (Niuma Mohamed), ploys to sunder Haseena and Atheef by creating a misleading impression regarding the relationship between Atheef and his secretary while Atheef is being told that Haseena is having an affair with her teacher, Ali Nafees (Ibrahim Rasheed).

== Cast ==
- Reeko Moosa Manik as Atheef
- Hassan Afeef as Shahid
- Niuma Mohamed as Azeeza
- Mariyam Nazima as Haseena
- Fauziyya Hassan as Nasheedha; Shahid's mother
- Satthar Ibrahim Manik as Atheef's father
- Mariyam Haleem as Khadheeja; Haseena's mother
- Zarana
- Ali Abdulla as Hameed (Special appearance)
- Sithi Fulhu as an aspiring actress (Special appearance)
- Ibrahim Rasheed as Ali Nafees (Special appearance)
- Haajara Abdul Kareem as Azeeza's mother (Special appearance)

== Soundtrack ==
Track listing
No.	Title	Lyrics	Singer(s)	Length
1.	"Loabeege Aalam Dhekeyshey"	Easa Shareef	Saahir, Fathimath Zoona
2.	"Gulhifaa Kandaa Vaahen"	Easa Shareef	Abdul Hannan Moosa Didi
3.	"Heeviyey Hithuge Haraarathu"	Saikuraa Ibrahim Naeem	Abdul Hannan Moosa Didi
4.	"Neyvaa Olhey"	Easa Shareef	Abdul Hannan Moosa Didi, Fathimath Zoona
5.	"Neyngeyhen Heelaafa"	Easa Shareef	Abdul Hannan Moosa Didi, Fathimath Zoona
