= Fathis Handhuvaru =

- Official film poster
- Directed by: Easa Shareef
- Written by: Ibrahim Waheed
- Screenplay by: Ibrahim Waheed; Easa Shareef
- Produced by: Aslam Rasheed
- Starring: Reeko Moosa Manik; Niuma Mohamed
- Cinematography: Ibrahim Moosa; Ibrahim Wisan; Abdulla Jameel
- Edited by: Mohamed Amsad
- Music by: Imad Ismail
- Production company: Slam Studio
- Release date: September 4, 1997
- Country: Maldives
- Language: Dhivehi

Fathis Handhuvaru (transl. Twilight) is a 1997 Maldivian horror film directed by Easa Shareef. Produced by Aslam Rasheed under Slam Studio, the film stars Reeko Moosa Manik and Niuma Mohamed in pivotal roles. The film is celebrated as the most successful and watched Maldivian film release and was considered to be the "all time favorite" Maldivian film.

== Plot ==
Zoona (Niuma Mohamed) and her friends travel to an uninhabited island for a short getaway. Amongst them is Jina (Reeko Moosa Manik) whom she's instantly attracted to and has a crush on, despite not having the confidence to pursue him. Because it's uninhabited, the caretaker of the island starts a generator manually; telling the group that he'll turn it off at midnight and warns them not to stay out after 11pm.

That night, Zoona wakes up past midnight and disregards the warning and sneaks out to the beach carrying an oil lamp. The night sky is beautiful and it's a full moon, she stargazes a while before she notices a figure in the distance. Startled and scared, she calls out and holds out her lamp hoping to illuminate the figure.

The figure turns out to be Jina, and he tells her he's been interested in her all along. Surprised and pleased that her attraction seems mutual, they flirt back and forth. He mentions that he's embarrassed by all the teasing that would inevitably follow if their friends should they know of their romantic involvement, and wishes to lay low during the day. They agree to meet again every night for the duration of the trip.When she says that they should head home, he tells her to leave first; that he'd follow soon after to avoid being caught together.

Upon returning home, she's surprised to see Jina already in bed and asleep in the hut they all share. The next morning, Jina is laying low as he said he would and they both pretend there's no involvement. She accompanies Jina when he goes to collect some wood and is surprised when he didn't seem to mind them being seen together and shrugs off the idea of anyone assuming something about their relationship.

The next night, Zoona sneaks out again but sees that Jina is still asleep in his bed when she steps out. When she reaches their secret spot at the beach however, Jina is already waiting for her. She asks how he made it there faster than her and he replies saying that he knows the island better. Zoona tells him that it's probably going to rain, to which he agrees. She has some doubts about their relationship but he smooths it over, and upon insistence take some photos together with a camera.

Jina asks her to make a decision before the rain starts pouring; go home or stay with him. She chooses to stay and he takes her to a hut. They spend the night together and she sneaks back in before the rest of their friend group wakes up.

During breakfast that morning, Zoona, Jina and one of the friends are having a chat when the friend teases Zoona about sneaking out the previous night. Jina does not cover for her and instead teases her as well, which upsets her. However, the friend says that he saw Zoona alone at the beach, bothered by this she confronts him later to ask what he meant by that. He tells her that he followed her and saw her alone, and that he saw her taking photos alone as well before he decided to go back home.

Suspicious and upset, she asks her friend Ainthu to follow her that night and watch her from a distance. Zoona meets Jina per usual while Ainthu stays out of sight. Zoona tells Jina that she wants to come clean to the friend group and let everyone know about their relationship so they can be together. And she tells him she doesn't want to pretend anymore and that they'd announce their relationship the very next day, during daytime, because Jina had previously told her not to talk to him during the day. Ainthu starts walking towards the couple and Jina makes a hasty retreat. Ainthu asks who Zoona's here to meet and it's evident that she has not seen anyone besides Zoona. Scared and confused, Zoona tells her friend everything that's been happening up till that point. Ainthu tells her that it's not normal and likely paranormal. She also tells her friend that she knows Jina very well, and that he's married with kids and vouches for his good character. Zoona had been meeting a Jinn who had disguised himself as Jina the whole time. Ainthu comforts Zoona saying that it will likely be over once they leave the island.

Devasted and confused, Zoona returns to Malé and discovers herself pregnant with the Jinns child. She gives birth to a human looking baby girl, Jenny, after an unusually easy pregnancy and labor. The Jinn appears outside her window. She has a religious text hanging in her room which prevents him from entering, but he seems eager to want to know his own child and professes his love for Zoona despite the deception. The Jinn wants to tell her his true name and show her his real form but Zoona stops him saying that she knew him as Jina so she'll call him as such, and that he better continue appearing as Jina instead. For a while she entertains him and tells him that she loves him as well, though nobody can know because they'll never understand. She tells him about how difficult her life had become as a result of their entanglement. He offers to relocate her and their baby to his world, leaving behind all the judgement and hardship. Zoona refuses him because she can't abandon her life and her own mother.

He then asks her to give her their daughter so he can introduce her to his family, promising that he'd return her. Zoona does not like the idea nor does she trust him, so she tells him to come back to take the baby later, after she's recovered from her postpartum state. He agrees and leaves.

Zoona confides in her friend Ainthu once again and tells her how she plans to get an amulet for Jenny, to prevent the Jinn Jina from taking her. Ainthu tells her that she's about to come between father and daughter, and asks if she no longer loves him. To which she replies saying that she loves the child more.

The Jinn Jina is mad at Zoona for going back on her word, and before disappearing tells her that he will return on Jenny's fifth birthday to take her.

Five years have passed since, and Zoona has married a kind man named Ihusan (Ali Shameel) an acquaintance of Ainthu who does not care about her past nor the fact that she is a single mother, and cares for Jenny as his own. She feels anxious as the time Jinn Jina mentioned has come. They take a family vacation which she only agrees to because it's not the island she met Jinn Jina at. But while at sea, a strange turn of events have them docking at the same island she feared.

Anxious about her return to where they met, especially with Jenny in tow, Zoona makes Jenny swear that she'll keep her amulet on and never take it off under any circumstances. Soon afterwards however, Jenny goes swimming, gets caught in the tide during which she loses the amulet and goes missing. She reappears in front of Zoona and tells her that a strange man saved her and flew her there.

That night, Jinn Jina appears as Ihusan and tricks Zoona into letting Jenny go with him. Ihusan is distraught and a search party commences, while Zoona searches alone and succeeds. Jenny is with her father up on a tree, both of them happy with the reunion. Jinn Jina informs Zoona that it's his time now, and that he'd return her again after five years, with Jenny reinsuring she'd come back then. The whole group continues to search for Jenny in the sea and forest while Jenny leaves with her father.

Five years later, Zoona and Ihusan have a son, Saajid. Meanwhile Jenny is presumed dead. Ever since Jenny disappeared with her dad, Zoona has not left the capital, but gives in for her son's sake and the family take a trip. But once again, strange circumstances force them to return to the same island which is now inhabited. On the island, they are being followed by Jenny while Jina fails to debauch Zoona. One night, during a social gathering Zoona lures a trap to burn Jina. Afterwards, Zoona convinced Ihusan to welcome Jenny into their family since she is an orphan. To avoid suspicion Jenny is strained from calling Zoona mother and she works as a maid in the house. To Zoona's disbelief, Jina shows up alive and reveals that jinns cannot be incinerated.

Several disputes arises between Zoona and Jina regarding her unfair treatment towards. Saajid falls very sick and Zoona blames it on Jina. However, he shows up with medication which Zoona refused to take. One night, when Saajid was admitted at hospital, Jina disguised as Ihusan have sex with her. Zoona, aware of his betrayal too late, brings a spell-maker who ultimatum has one of the two options; Either Jenny and Jina separates or Zoona dies. Jina exposes Ihusan's true identity that he has a wife and two kids elsewhere to Zoona which she refused to believe. One last time, Jina offered Zoona to migrate to his world which she declines. Saajid dies and Ihusan attempted to make a spell on Jenny believing she is the root of all problems. Jina threatens Zoona that he will take Jenny with him and he once more will impregnate her, making her give birth to a ghost rather than a human after suffering a strenuous labor. Jina murders the spell-maker and come to take Jenny with him.

On their departure, Zoona creates a scene blaming Saajid's death on Jina. Ihusan joins them and was surprised to see Jina and Jenny. Jina reveals the true identity of Jenny, their secret affair and informs about Zoona's next child. As soon as they leave she has a swift pregnancy and delivers an undefined-shaped ghost. Ihusan and Zoona discuss about the fate of their relationship. He agrees to take her in his life only if she gets rid of her new-born child. A breakout happens and is revealed that Ihusan is being killed by her child. It later changes its form to its true shape freaking out Zoona.

== Cast ==
- Reeko Moosa Manik as Jina
- Niuma Mohamed as Zoona
- Ali Shameel as Ihusan
- Arifa Ibrahim as Zoona's mother
- Mariyam Sheleen as Jenny / Sajidh
- Hawwa Enee as Jenny

== Soundtrack ==
Track listing
No.	Title	Lyrics	Music	Singer(s)	Length
1.	"Boa Vehey Vaareya"	Easa Shareef	Mohamed Ahmed	Abdul Hannan Moosa Didi, Shifa Thaufeeq	05:05
2.	"Fathis Handhuvaru Hekivedheyney"	Easa Shareef	Mohamed Ahmed	Sahir	04:16
3.	"Dhekey Hithun Dhen Kalaa"	Easa Shareef	Mohamed Ahmed	Fathimath Zoona, Sahir	04:39
4.	"Uff Heevanee"	Easa Shareef	Mohamed Ahmed	Abdul Hannan Moosa Didi, Fathimath Zoona	05:05
5.	"Leygaavaa Thi Nan"	Easa Shareef	Mohamed Ahmed	Abdul Hannan Moosa Didi	05:00
6.	"Hithuge Hin'gumaa"	Easa Shareef		Abdul Hannan Moosa Didi	03:55
7.	"Mi Araa Iraku Han'dhaku"	Easa Shareef		Fathimath Zoona	03:52
8.	"Moya Hiyy Dhoa"	Easa Shareef		Abdul Hannan Moosa Didi, Zuhura Waheedh	02:51
9.	"Kaakuthoa Bunedheyshey"	Easa Shareef		Abdul Hannan Moosa Didi, Shifa Thaufeeq	05:17
10.	"Dhaagothah Maruvaashe Vee"	Easa Shareef		Abdul Hannan Moosa Didi	03:28
11.	"Iquraaru Kurume Molhuvaanee"	Easa Shareef		Shifa Thaufeeq	04:24
12.	"Lakka Asaru Kurey Mihaaru"	Easa Shareef		Abdulla Waheedh (Feeali)	04:51
Total length:					52:47

== Reception ==
The film received positive response from critics. Ahmed Nadheem from Haveeru wrote: "Fathis Handhuvaru is easily the best Maldivian horror film released in Maldivian Cinema. The spine-chilling memory of the film will never be able to leave the mind of cinema-goers. The scene where Jinaa sparkles a lightning from his eyes and shatters the window is a "classic shot" and will be long-remembered. He also appreciated with the inclusion of a "male ghost" in lead role which is featured in a Maldivian film for the first time.

== Accolades ==
Year	Award	Category	Recipient(s)	Result
1998	Aafathis Awards - 1997	Best Film	Fathis Handhuvaru	Won
1998	Aafathis Awards - 1997	Best Director	Easa Shareef	Won
1998	Aafathis Awards - 1997	Best Actor	Reeko Moosa Manik	Won
1998	Aafathis Awards - 1997	Best Actress	Niuma Mohamed	Won
1998	Aafathis Awards - 1997	Best Supporting Actor	Ali Shameel	Won
1998	Aafathis Awards - 1997	Best Male Playback Singer	Abdul Hannaan Moosa Didi for "Leygaa Vaathee Nan"	Won
1998	Aafathis Awards - 1997	Best Female Playback Singer	Fathimath Zoona for "Uff Heevanee"	Won
1998	Aafathis Awards - 1997	Best Child Artist	Mariyam Sheleen	Won
1998	Aafathis Awards - 1997	Best Story	Binmaa Ibrahim Waheedh	Won
1998	Aafathis Awards - 1997	Best Dialogue	Binmaa Ibrahim Waheedh	Won
2007	3rd Gaumee Film Awards	Best Actress	Niuma Mohamed	Nominated
2007	3rd Gaumee Film Awards	Best Actor	Reeko Moosa Manik	Nominated

== Prequel ==
Dark Rain Entertainment had announced plans to make a prequel called Fathis Handhuvaruge Feshun 3D which tells of Jina and his journey till he meets Zoona. Yoosuf Shafeeu replaced Reeko Moosa Manik as Jina while Fathimath Fareela, Ahmed Nimal, Ahmed Saeed and Ahmed Faisal were included to the cast. The film was marketed as being the first 3D release for a Maldivian film and the first release derived from spin-off. However, upon release the film received generally negative reviews from critics.
