= Easa Shareef =

Maldivian film director

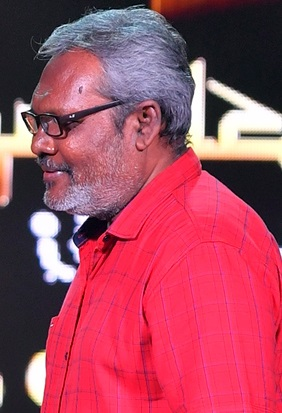
- Shareef at 9th Gaumee Film Awards ceremony, 2019
- Born: 26 August 1961 (age 64); Male City
- Occupations: Director, actor, screen-writer, editor, lyricist
- Years active: 1984–present
- Spouse: Nasheedha Ismail
- Children: 6

Easa Shareef is a Maldivian film director, actor, screen-writer, editor and lyricist.

== Career ==
In 1993, Shareef collaborated with Yoosuf Rafeeu for his tragedy drama film Vaudhu (1993) which narrates the separation of a happy couple due to the societal differences. The following year, he directed and starred in the critically acclaimed film Zakham (1994) where he played the supportive brother of a young girl who has been forced to marry out of her will. In 1996, he directed the film Edhuvas Hingajje which follows the love triangle of a devoted wife, a reckless husband and his short tempered mistress. This was followed by Yoosuf Rafeeu's award winning film Haqqu which revolves around a man who is forced to marry a woman against his will, and stars Mariyam Nisha, Reeko Moosa Manik and Mariyam Shakeela in lead roles. The film received positive reviews from critics.

In 1997, Shareef released the most successful film of his career, the horror film Fathis Handhuvaru (1997), which stars Reeko Moosa Manik and Niuma Mohamed in lead roles. The film narrates the story of a married young woman who falls in love with a ghost. It received both critical and commercial success, where it is celebrated as one of the most successful Maldivian film with the highest number of shows screened upon release. The same year, he released the drama film Emme Fahu Dhuvas (2000), starring Reeko Moosa Manik, Niuma Mohamed, Hassan Afeef, and Mariyam Nazima. The following year, he collaborated with Arifa Ibrahim to co-write the drama film Dhauvaa (1998), which was an unofficial remake of Deepak Sareen's Bollywood film Aaina (1993).

In 2000, he directed another horror film 2000 Vana Ufan Dhuvas which follows the affair and revenge of a twins. The following year, he collaborated with Aishath Ali Manik for her romantic drama film Hiiy Edhenee, to adapt Dharmesh Darshan's romantic film Dhadkan (2000), along with Ahmed Nimal, which was well received by critics and audience. In the film, he starred as a ruthless father who forces his daughter to cut off the ties with an underpreviledged man.

In 2003, Easa Shareef directed the horror film, titled Ginihila (2003), which stars Ali Seezan, Mariyam Nisha, Niuma Mohamed and Reeko Moosa Manik in lead roles. The film is an unofficial remake of Vikram Bhatt's Indian horror film Raaz (2002), featuring Bipasha Basu, Dino Morea, Malini Sharma, and Ashutosh Rana, which itself is an unofficial adaptation of What Lies Beneath. Apart from that, Shareef directed a five episode television series, Dheewanaa Hiyy which focuses on the reunion of a long lost family through conflicts and disputes.

Shareef's action-adventure film Hatharu Udhares was released in 2004 which stars Ali Seezan, Reeko Moosa Manik, Ali Ahmed and Mariyam Manike in lead roles and marketed as the first adventurous Maldivian film. Upon release, it received mixed to negative reviews from critics, where several critics lauded the post production of the film and the directors were criticized for releasing a "half-baked" film.

Apart from direction, acting, screenwriting and editing, Shareef is notable as a lyricist for his work in several films and studio albums. At the 7th Gaumee Film Awards, Shareef received a nomination as the Best Lyricist for his song "Inthizaarey Othee Hiyy Edheythee" from the film Kuhveriakee Kaakuhey? (2011).

== Filmography ==
=== As an actor ===
Feature film
Year	Title	Role	Notes	Ref(s)
1984	Nufoozu		Also the director	
1988	Haasil		Also the director	
1990	Loabi '90	Ashraf	Also the director, screenwriter and editor	
1990	Karunaige Agu	Ziyad	Also the director and producer	
1992	Naseebu		Also the director	
1993	Vaudhu	Fazla's brother		
1994	Alathu Loabi	Shareef		
1994	Zakham	Nadheem	Also the director	
1995	Dhushman	Riyaz's brother		
1996	Haqqu	Hameed	Also the editor	
2001	Hiiy Edhenee	Mohamed Yoosuf	Also the writer	

Short film
Year	Title	Role	Notes	Ref(s)
1996	Kolhukehi	Easa	Main role	

=== Other work ===
Year	Title	Director	Producer	Writer	Editor	Camera	Notes	Ref(s)
1984	Nufoozu	Yes						
1988	Haasil	Yes						
1990	Karunaige Agu	Yes	Yes	Yes	Yes			
1990	Loabi '90	Yes						
1992	Naseebu	Yes						
1993	Gundolhi	Yes					Teledrama	
1993	Vaudhu	Yes						
1994	Alathu Loabi	Yes			Yes			
1994	Zakham	Yes			Yes	Yes		
1996	Edhuvas Hingajje	Yes		Yes				
1996	Haqqu				Yes			
1997	Fathis Handhuvaru	Yes		Yes				
1998	Dhauvaa			Yes				
2000	2000 Vana Ufan Dhuvas	Yes		Yes				
2000	Emme Fahu Dhuvas	Yes		Yes	Yes			
2001	Hiiy Edhenee			Yes	Yes			
2003	Ginihila	Yes		Yes	Yes			
2003	Dheewanaa Hiyy	Yes		Yes	Yes		5 episodes	
2004	Hatharu Udhares	Yes		Yes				

== Discography ==
=== As a lyricist ===
Feature Film
Year	Film	Song	Artist(s)	Notes
1990	Loabi '90	"Hithuge Vindhey Avas Vedhanee"	Abdul Hannan Moosa Didi, Sofoora Khaleel	
1990	Loabi '90	"Loabeege Dhaairaain"	Massoodh Moosa Didi, Zahiyya Thaufeeq	
1993	Sitee	"Mulhi Jaan Hithaa"	Mohamed Huzam	
1993	Vaudhu	"Inthihaa Keiykurun"	Abdulla Waheedh (Feeali)	
1993	Vaudhu	"Signal Dhehithun Dhey Buneveynehey"	Abdulla Waheedh (Feeali), Aminath Ibrahim	
1993	Vaudhu	"Vakivegen Dhaathee Hithaa Mey Thelheyney" (Male Version)	Abdulla Waheedh (Feeali)	
1993	Vaudhu	"Loabin Kalaa Nulibeynenyaa"	Abdulla Waheedh (Feeali), Aminath Ibrahim	
1993	Vaudhu	"Vakivegen Dhaathee Hithaa Mey Thelheyney" (Female Version)	Aminath Ibrahim	
1994	Dhevana An'bi	"Hissaa Kuraashey Asaru Mithuraaey"	Aminath Hussain	
1994	Alathu Loabi	"Nishana, I Love You"	Abdulla Waheedh (Feeali), Aminath Hussain	
1994	Alathu Loabi	"Hunumaai Majaa"	Abdul Satthar	
1994	Alathu Loabi	"Ishaaraathu Libenee Dhurudhurun Dhey"	Imaadh Ismail, Shafeeqa Abdul Latheef	
1994	Alathu Loabi	"Mihiyy Adhu Roolhi Dhaahaa"	Abdulla Waheedh (Feeali)	
1994	Alathu Loabi	"Hin'gamun Thelhemun Meygaa"	Haneef Hussain, Aminath Hussain	
1996	Lheedharifulhu	"Inthihaa Yaaru Libun"	Abdulla Waheedh (Feeali)	
1996	Lheedharifulhu	"Dhen Othee Hoadhumey"	Mohamed Rashad, Shifa Thaufeeq	
1996	Edhuvas Hingajje	"Ma Edhey Ufaa Dheveyne"	Abdul Hannan Moosa Didi	
1996	Edhuvas Hingajje	"Kalaa Aeemaa Han'dhaa Iru"	Abdul Hannan Moosa Didi	
1996	Fun Asaru	"Neyngi Hithey Gendhevee"	Ali Rameez, Shifa Thaufeeq	
1997	Emme Fahu Dhuvas	"Gulhifaa Kan'daa Vaahen"	Abdul Hannan Moosa Didi	
1997	Emme Fahu Dhuvas	"Loabeege Aalam Dhekeyshey"	Sahir, Fathimath Zoona	
1997	Emme Fahu Dhuvas	"Neyngeyhen Heelaafaa"	Abdul Hannan Moosa Didi, Fathimath Zoona	
1997	Emme Fahu Dhuvas	"Neyvaa Olhey"	Abdul Hannan Moosa Didi, Fathimath Zoona	
1997	Fathis Handhuvaru	"Boa Vehey Vaareyaa"	Abdul Hannan Moosa Didi, Shifa Thaufeeq	
1997	Fathis Handhuvaru	"Fathis Han'dhuvaru Hekivedheyney"	Sahir	
1997	Fathis Handhuvaru	"Dhekey Hithun Dhen Kalaa"	Sahir, Fathimath Zoona	
1997	Fathis Handhuvaru	"Uff Heevanee"	Abdul Hannan Moosa Didi, Fathimath Zoona	
1997	Fathis Handhuvaru	"Leygaa Vaathee Nan"	Abdul Hannan Moosa Didi	
1997	Fathis Handhuvaru	"Hithuge Hin'gumaa"	Abdul Hannan Moosa Didi	Appears in Soundtrack album
1997	Fathis Handhuvaru	"Dhaagothah Maruvaashe Vee"	Abdul Hannan Moosa Didi	Appears in Soundtrack album
1997	Fathis Handhuvaru	"Miaraa Iraku Han'dhaku"	Fathimath Zoona	Appears in Soundtrack album
1997	Fathis Handhuvaru	"Iquraaru Kurume Molhuvaanee"	Shifa Thaufeeq	Appears in Soundtrack album
1997	Fathis Handhuvaru	"Kaakuthoa Bunedheyshey"	Abdul Hannan Moosa Didi, Shifa Thaufeeq	Appears in Soundtrack album
1997	Fathis Handhuvaru	"Moya Hiyy Dhoa"	Abdul Hannan Moosa Didi, Zuhura Waheedh	Appears in Soundtrack album
1997	Fathis Handhuvaru	"Lakka Asaru Kurey Mihaaru"	Abdulla Waheedh (Feeali)	Appears in Soundtrack album
1998	Ethoofaaneerey	"Thi Lolun Saafuvee"	Abdul Hannan Moosa Didi, Shifa Thaufeeq	
1998	Dhauvaa	"Konme Vindhakun Jahaa"	Imaadh Ismail, Mariyam Waheedha	
1998	Dhauvaa	"Thiya Heelaa Gothun"	Imaadh Ismail, Mariyam Waheedha	
1998	Dhauvaa	"Loabi Hoadhan Kuraa Dhauvaa"	Imaadh Ismail, Mariyam Waheedha	
1998	Dhauvaa	"Meebaa E Hama Naseebakee"	Mariyam Waheedha	
1998	Dhauvaa	"Heenukuraahaa Loabivamey"	Mariyam Waheedha	
1998	Huvafen	"Ekee Heynan"	Imaadh Ismail, Ammaar Aslam	
1998	Huvafen	"Hiyy Magey Nagaadhinee"	Imaadh Ismail	
1998	Huvafen	"Gendhaashey Loabeege Khiyaal"	Imaadh Ismail, Mariyam Waheedha	
1999	Qurbaani	"Heylaa Hunnanveemaa"	Abdul Hannan Moosa Didi, Shifa Thaufeeq	
1999	Viraashaa	"Vanee Haas Neyvaa"	Abdul Hannan Moosa Didi, Fathimath Zoona	
2000	2000 Vana Ufan Dhuvas	"Hinithunvelaashey Malaa Ey"	Imaadh Ismail, Fazeela Amir	
2000	2000 Vana Ufan Dhuvas	"Dhekilaa Hithey Vanee"	Ali Rameez, Fathimath Zoona	
2000	2000 Vana Ufan Dhuvas	"Fini Roalhi Beehenee Ey"	Abdul Hannan Moosa Didi, Fazeela Amir	
2000	2000 Vana Ufan Dhuvas	"Ey Sudha"	Ali Rameez	
2000	2000 Vana Ufan Dhuvas	"Balaanumelaa Dhevey Magakun"	Abdul Hannan Moosa Didi	
2001	Aaah	"Vee Athuga Hifanhey"	Ibrahim Amir, Fazeela Amir	
2001	Hiiy Edhenee	"Hiyy Edhenee" (Duet Version)	Abdul Hannan Moosa Didi, Fathimath Zoona	
2001	Hiiy Edhenee	"Hiyyves Dhen Fisaari Moyaey" (Version 1)	Abdul Hannan Moosa Didi, Fathimath Zoona, Abdul Baaree	
2001	Hiiy Edhenee	"Hiyyves Dhen Fisaari Moyaey" (Version 2)	Abdul Baaree, Fathimath Zoona	
2001	Hiiy Edhenee	"Hoahoa Govamun"	Ali Rameez, Fathimath Zoona	
2001	Hiiy Edhenee	"Furusathu Libi Dhuniyeygaa"	Fathimath Zoona	
2001	Hiiy Edhenee	"Hiyy Edhenee" (Male Version)	Abdul Hannan Moosa Didi	
2001	Hiiy Edhenee	"Yaqeeney Neiy Araameh"	Abdul Hannan Moosa Didi	Appears in Soundtrack album
2001	Hiiy Edhenee	"Hiyy Ufaavey Kalaa Balaaleemaa"	Abdul Hannan Moosa Didi	Appears in Soundtrack album
2001	Hiiy Edhenee	"Aadhakoh Mi Magun"	Abdul Hannan Moosa Didi	Appears in Soundtrack album
2001	Hiiy Edhenee	"Fennaane Jehunu Bika Haal"	Shifa Thaufeeq	Appears in Soundtrack album
2001	Hiiy Edhenee	"Nan Ahaalan Haadha Beynumey"	Fathimath Zoona	Appears in Soundtrack album
2001	Ranmuiy	"Bahdhal Vumun Vejje Dheewaanaa"	Ibrahim Amir, Fazeela Amir	
2002	Aan... Aharenves Loabivin	"Huvafen Dhekeynee"	Ali Rameez, Fazeela Amir	
2003	Ginihila	"Fun Asarugaa Mihiyy"	Ali Rameez, Shifa Thaufeeq	
2003	Ginihila	"Dhiriulhumakee Miee Nunimey"	Abdul Baaree, Fathimath Zoona	
2003	Ginihila	"Loaiybakee Haadhahaa Fun Asarekey"	Abdul Baaree	
2003	Ginihila	"Loabi Mee Jaazubee Foni Asarekey"	Shifa Thaufeeq	
2003	Ginihila	"Dhekilan Edheythee"	Ali Rameez, Thoahira Hussain	
2003	Dhonkamana	"Annanee Fenvaruvan"	Abdul Baaree, Fathimath Zoona	
2003	Dhonkamana	"Naazukee Balaalun"	Abdul Hannan Moosa Didi, Fathimath Zoona	
2003	Dhonkamana	"Thiya Khiyaal Foheleveyhey"	Abdul Hannan Moosa Didi, Shifa Thaufeeq	
2003	Vehey Vaarey Therein	"Nan Bunan Kereynehey"	Abdul Baaree, Shifa Thaufeeq	
2003	Vehey Vaarey Therein	"Yaaraa Ey Loaiybeh Nuveyhey"	Mohamed Zaidh, Unoosha	
2003	Vehey Vaarey Therein	"Kalaa Kalaa"	Aishath Inaya	
2003	Vehey Vaarey Therein	"I Love You"	Muaviyath Anwar	
2003	Vehey Vaarey Therein	"Jaadhoogaa Jehijjey"	Mukhthar Adam, Aishath Inaya	
2003	Vehey Vaarey Therein	"Loabeege Nanves Kiyaaney"	Mukhthar Adam, Aishath Inaya	
2004	Hatharu Udhares	"Vefaa Othee Dhen Kon Kushehbaa Ey"	Abdul Hannan Moosa Didi, Shifa Thaufeeq	
2004	Dharinnahtakai	"Insaaneke Mee Dhuniyeygaa" (Female Version)	Rafiyath Rameeza	
2004	Dharinnahtakai	"Insaaneke Mee Dhuniyeygaa" (Male Version)	Ibrahim Rameez	
2005	Hureemey Inthizaarugaa	"Miadhu Ulhunas Mithaa"	Mukhthar Adam, Shifa Thaufeeq	
2005	Hureemey Inthizaarugaa	"Hiyy Furaadhey"	Mukhthar Adam, Shifa Thaufeeq	
2005	Hureemey Inthizaarugaa	"Firumunthakun Thedhey"	Fazeela Amir	
2005	Hureemey Inthizaarugaa	"Visnaa Visnaa"	Abdul Baaree, Shifa Thaufeeq	
2005	Hureemey Inthizaarugaa	"Ma Dhuru Nuvaanan"	Mohamed Abdul Ghanee, Shifa Thaufeeq	
2005	Hureemey Inthizaarugaa	"Ulhenee Thi Dhurah Dhaan"	Mukhthar Adam, Unoosha	
2005	Hureemey Inthizaarugaa	"Haadhahaa Fariyey Thi Harakaaiy"	Mukhthar Adam	
2005	Hureemey Inthizaarugaa	"Maaiykalaakoa Ey"	Mukhthar Adam	
2005	Hureemey Inthizaarugaa	"Moosun Genesdhey Nayaa"	Ibrahim Amir, Fazeela Amir	Appears in Soundtrack album
2005	Hureemey Inthizaarugaa	"Bunebalaa Loabivey Bunebalaa"	Mohamed Abdul Ghanee	Appears in Soundtrack album
2005	Hureemey Inthizaarugaa	"Dhekilan Edheythee"	Ali Rameez, Thoahira Hussain	Appears in Soundtrack album
2011	Hafaraaiy	"Kuran Gandhee Huvaa"	Hassan Ilham, Shifa Thaufeeq	
2011	Hithey Dheymee	"Huvafenthakey Dhekkee Kalaa"	Abdul Hannan Moosa Didi	
2011	Kuhveriakee Kaakuhey?	"Khiyaalee Vaafashun"	Abdul Hannan Moosa Didi, Fathimath Rauf	
2011	Kuhveriakee Kaakuhey?	"Inthizaarey Othee Hiyy Edheythee"	Abdul Hannan Moosa Didi	
2011	Kuhveriakee Kaakuhey?	"Insaafeh Loabeegaa Nethey"	Abdul Hannan Moosa Didi	Appears in Soundtrack album
2014	Aadheys	"Dhefuraana Ekuvefaavaa"	Ali Rameez, Rafiyath Rameeza	
2019	Nafrathuvumun	"Saadhaa Mooney Mooney Thee"	Ahmed Reehan	
2021	Loabi Vevijje	"Miss Veyey"	Abdul Hannan Moosa Didi	Appears in Soundtrack album

Television
Year	Title	Song	Artist(s)
N/A	N/A	"Hithugaa Thi Nan Vaathee"	Abdul Hannan Moosa Didi
1993	Dhen Keehkuraanee?	"Kalaage Loabi Libeythoa"	Abdulla Waheedh (Feeali), Shifa Thaufeeq
1997-1999	Kahthiri	"Mee Himeyn Dhanvaru"	Abdul Hannan Moosa Didi, Shifa Thaufeeq
2000	Dhoapatta	"Hoadhumah Dhaanan"	Mukhthar Adam, Shifa Thaufeeq
2003	Dheewanaa Hiyy	"Thiya Loabi Aalaavanee Ey"	Hassan Ilham, Fathimath Rauf

Non-Film Songs
Year	Album/single	Song	Artist(s)
1990	Guldhasthaa	"Evaareyaa Themi Foavee"	Abdulla Waheedh (Feeali)
1991	Bahaaru Moosum	"Neyngi Sirrun Kalaa"	Mohamed Rashad
1992	Guldhasthaa 2	"Hissaa Kuraashey Asaru Mithuraa Ey"	Aminath Hussain
1992	Guldhasthaa 2	"Roveniyyey Hama Themeniyyey"	Aminath Hussain
1992	Hirilandhoo Mala 2	"Viyya Loabi Dhiniyyaa"	Abdul Satthar, Aminath Hussain
1992	Hirilandhoo Mala 2	"Furusathu Dheynan Hunnaashey"	Haneef Hussain, Aminath Hussain
1993	Hiyani	"Mulhi Jaan Hithaa"	Mohamed Huzam
1994	Asaru	"Mihiyy Adhu Roolhi Dhaahaa"	Abdulla Waheedh (Feeali)
1994	Loodhifaa	"Dheyn Bunihaa Hadhiyaa Kobaa"	Aishath Inaya
1994	Loodhifaa	"Aslu Athugaa Beehilaa"	Umar Zahir
1994	Loodhifaa	"Reyrey Kurevey Mee Araam"	Umar Zahir, Shifa Thaufeeq
1994	Loodhifaa	"Thihira Gothakun Balaa"	Umar Zahir, Shifa Thaufeeq
1995	Aniyaa	"Hiyy Edheythee Ma Edhemey"	Abdul Hannan Moosa Didi
1995	Aniyaa	"Loabin Kalaage Raaey Dhin"	Abdul Hannan Moosa Didi
1995	Aniyaa	"Kastholhunney Kalaa"	Abdul Hannan Moosa Didi
1995	Aniyaa	"Jaanuge Faruvaa Dheefiyey"	Abdul Hannan Moosa Didi
1995	Aniyaa	"Govenee Ey Nudhaashey Aadhey"	Aminath Ibrahim
1995	Aniyaa	"Salaamey Vakivanee Ey"	Mohamed Rashad
1995	Aniyaa	"Bunamey Roifaa Dheynuhey"	Fathimath Zoona
1995	Aniyaa	"Ley Dhauruve Uthurey Naaruthakey"	Fathimath Zoona
1995	Han'dhaan	"Miee Thiya Maqaamey"	Sofa Thaufeeq
1995	Hiyfahi 2	"Mirey Beehileemaa"	Abdul Hannan Moosa Didi, Fazeela Amir
1995	Thaubeer	"Samaasaa Samaasaathakun"	Abdul Hannan Moosa Didi, Sofa Thaufeeq
1995	Thaubeer	"Dhen Othee Hoadhumey"	Mohamed Rashad, Shifa Thaufeeq
1995	Thaubeer	"Inthihaa Yaaru Libun"	Abdulla Waheedh (Feeali)
1995	Thaubeer	"Biruverikan Vey"	Abdul Hannan Moosa Didi
1995	Thaubeer	"Faalhuga Hiyy Mi Dhenee"	Abdul Hannan Moosa Didi, Shifa Thaufeeq
1996	Fiyavalhu	"Hithugaa Thinan Vaathee"	Abdul Hannan Moosa Didi
1996	Fiyavalhu	"Dheewaanaa Kuraa Baarun"	Abdul Hannan Moosa Didi, Fathimath Zoona
1996	Misraab	"Dheyshey Hithuge Maqaam"	Abdul Hannan Moosa Didi, Fathimath Zoona
1996	Misraab	"Gelluvaalee E Thi An'dhireege Himeynkan"	Abdul Hannan Moosa Didi, Fathimath Zoona
1996	Misraab	"Mihenvee Furaanaiga Dhirumeh Hureemaa"	Abdul Hannan Moosa Didi
1996	Misraab	"Huvafenthakey Dhekkee Kalaa"	Abdul Hannan Moosa Didi
1996	Misraab	"Loabi Loabin Salaam"	Abdul Hannan Moosa Didi
1996	Misraab	"Nethee Hithaama Thahammal"	Umar Zahir
1996	Misraab	"Edheythee Reethi Moonaa"	Umar Zahir
1996	Misraab	"Hithuga E Loabin Vikaafaa"	Abdul Hannan Moosa Didi, Shifa Thaufeeq
1996	Misraab	"Thunfathaa Moonaa Lolaa"	Abdul Hannan Moosa Didi, Shifa Thaufeeq
1996	Misraab	"Hiyy Dhen Kuree Kon Kushehhey"	Ahmed Amir
1996	Sahaaraa	"Furi Loa Dhanee"	Abdul Hannan Moosa Didi, Shifa Thaufeeq
1996	Sahaaraa	"Loabivanyaa Kureegaa Bunaashey"	Umar Zahir
1996	Sahaaraa	"Neyngi Hithey Gendhevee"	Ali Rameez, Shifa Thaufeeq
1996	Sahaaraa	"Ufaavee Raasthaa Vee"	Ali Rameez
1996	Udhares	"Hiyy Oyaalaathoa Kalaa"	Abdul Hannan Moosa Didi, Fathimath Zoona
1996	Udhares	"Ey Nuforuvaa Khazaanaa"	Abdul Hannan Moosa Didi, Fathimath Zoona
1996	Udhares	"Kollee Nagaafaa Samaasaa"	Abdul Hannan Moosa Didi, Fathimath Zoona
1996	Udhares	"E Loabeege Raanee"	Abdul Hannan Moosa Didi
1996	Udhares	"Hiyy Magey Adhu Halaakuvaathee Ey"	Abdul Hannan Moosa Didi
1996	Udhares	"Ma Kurin Huree Nuangaashey"	Abdul Hannan Moosa Didi
1996	Udhares	"Dhehiyy Gulhunee Kihaa Loabin"	Abdul Hannan Moosa Didi
1996	Udhares	"Kalaa Dhuh Fahunney Thedhey"	Abdul Hannan Moosa Didi
1997	Alivilun	"Dhookurey Keekey"	Abdul Hannan Moosa Didi, Fathimath Zoona
1997	Alivilun	"Inkaaru Kuran Seedhaa"	Abdul Hannan Moosa Didi, Fathimath Zoona
1997	Eheege Adu	"Naaraa Han'dhaa Ey"	Ali Rameez
1997	Kurunees	"Ladhunhe Loamaraa Nulaashey"	Abdul Hannan Moosa Didi
1997	Sarindhaa	"Sirru Sirrun Kuri Ishaaraaiy"	Abdul Hannan Moosa Didi, Fazeela Amir
1997	Sarindhaa	"Haadha Edhen Kairin Dheken"	Abdul Hannan Moosa Didi, Fazeela Amir
1997	Sarindhaa	"Hoonuvanee Jismaa Mey"	Ibrahim Amir
1997	Xth	"Udun Tharithah"	Mohamed Maajidh (Mezzo)
1998	Foni Zaharu	"Ey Nuruhunvee Dhoa"	Abdul Hannan Moosa Didi, Fazeela Amir
1998	Foni Zaharu	"Mee Namugaa Vaguthee Shaairekey"	Abdul Hannan Moosa Didi
1998	Foni Zaharu	"Neenaa Aadhey Neenaa"	Abdul Hannan Moosa Didi
1998	Foni Zaharu	"Insaafeh Loabeegaa Nethey"	Abdul Hannan Moosa Didi
1998	Foni Zaharu	"Umurah Nidhan Mi Dheloa Meree"	Abdul Hannan Moosa Didi
1998	Foni Zaharu	"Inthizaarey Othee Hiyy Edheythee"	Abdul Hannan Moosa Didi
1998	Foni Zaharu	"Thi Lolun Saafuvee"	Abdul Hannan Moosa Didi, Shifa Thaufeeq
1998	Foni Zaharu	"Ninjeh Naadhey"	Abdul Hannan Moosa Didi, Shifa Thaufeeq
1998	Foni Zaharu	"Shukuriyaa Hama Shukuriyaa"	Abdul Hannan Moosa Didi, Shifa Thaufeeq
1998	Foni Zaharu	"Naazukee Balaalun"	Abdul Hannan Moosa Didi, Fathimath Zoona
1998	Furaana	"Veynugaa Hunnan Mihaa"	Ali Rameez
1998	Furaana	"Hairaan Nuveyhey"	Ali Rameez
1998	Randhoadhi	"Seedhaa En'gi Huregen"	Ali Rameez
1998	Thaureef	"Heylaa Hunnanveemaa"	Abdul Hannan Moosa Didi, Shifa Thaufeeq
1999	Farumaan	"Dhahi Nukuraashey"	Ali Rameez, Fathimath Zoona
1999	Himeyn	"Eynaage Khabareh Neiy Vefaa"	Rafiyath Rameeza
1999	Himeyn	"Fahun Beywafaa Vee"	Rafiyath Rameeza
1999	Himeyn	"Nufilaa Thadheh Zamaanvee"	Rafiyath Rameeza
1999	Himeyn	"Rahumu Neiy Dhuniyeyn"	Rafiyath Rameeza
1999	Himeyn	"Reethi Malah Ekuraa Ziyaaraaiy"	Rafiyath Rameeza
1999	Himeyn	"Heydhavey Gadi Heydhavey"	Ali Rameez, Rafiyath Rameeza
1999	Himeyn	"Loabivan Thiya Khiyaalu Kuran"	Ali Rameez, Rafiyath Rameeza
1999	Himeyn	"Maunavee Aalamun"	Ali Rameez, Rafiyath Rameeza
1999	Himeyn	"Insaanaa Meedhoa"	Ibrahim Rameez, Rafiyath Rameeza
1999	Himeyn	"Moosun Alivejjey"	Ibrahim Amir, Rafiyath Rameeza
1999	Kalhirava	"Heyo Haalugaa"	Ali Rameez
1999	Kalhirava	"Dhookoh Ma Dhiyaimaa"	Ali Rameez
1999	Kalhirava	"Hithi Veynehgaa"	Ali Rameez
1999	Kalhirava	"Eyruge Fun Han'dhaan"	Ali Rameez
1999	Kastholhu	"Adugadha Nukuraashey"	Abdul Hannan Moosa Didi, Fathimath Zoona
1999	Kastholhu	"Vanee Haas Neyvaa"	Abdul Hannan Moosa Didi, Fathimath Zoona
1999	Kastholhu	"Rulhin Dhen Noolheyshey"	Abdul Hannan Moosa Didi, Fathimath Zoona
1999	Kastholhu	"Foaraanehey Baaru"	Abdul Hannan Moosa Didi, Fathimath Zoona
1999	Kastholhu	"Hithugaavaa Loabi Dheynee Aima Ey"	Abdul Hannan Moosa Didi, Fathimath Zoona
1999	Kastholhu	"Mibinmathee Dhirihurumuge"	Fathimath Zoona
1999	Kastholhu	"Hiyyheyo Kameh Huregenney"	Fathimath Zoona
1999	Malakaa	"Nuvaanama Kalaa"	Mohamed Huzam, Shifa Thaufeeq
1999	Malakaa	"Hoadhumah Dhaanan"	Mukhthar Adam, Shifa Thaufeeq
1999	Malakaa	"Dhefuraana Ekuvefaavaa"	Ali Rameez, Rafiyath Rameeza
1999	Rukkuri	"Merifavee Dheloa Hulhuvee"	Mukhthar Adam
1999	Thafaathu	"Ekee Heynan"	Imaadh Ismail, Ammaar Aslam
1999	Thafaathu	"Hiyy Magey Nagaadhinee"	Imaadh Ismail
1999	Thafaathu	"Gendhaashey Loabeege Khiyaal"	Imaadh Ismail, Mariyam Waheedha
2000	Goyye	"Lolakah Ninjeh Naadhey"	Ali Rameez
2000	Hinithun	"Mihaarah Loabin"	Ahmed Rasheedh (Hulhudheli)
2000	Inthihaa	"Ihusaaseh Veyhey"	Ahmed Aathif, Shifa Thaufeeq
2000	Karuna	"Magey Haalu Bunedhen Mithuraa Ey"	Ali Rameez
2000	Karuna	"Maazeevee Foni Dhaurun"	Ali Rameez
2000	Karuna	"Umurah Thiya Namugaa"	Ali Rameez
2000	Karuna	"Gasthugaa Kiyaadhemey"	Ali Rameez
2000	Karuna	"Erey Haadha Loabin"	Ali Rameez
2000	Karuna	"Vaudheh Mirey Vaanan"	Ali Rameez, Rafiyath Rameeza
2000	Koadi	"Ey Sudha"	Ali Rameez
2000	Koadi	"Dhekilaa Hithey Vanee"	Ali Rameez, Fathimath Zoona
2000	Koadi	"Hinithunvelaashey Malaa Ey"	Imaadh Ismail, Fazeela Amir
2000	Koadi	"Fini Roalhi Beehenee Ey"	Abdul Hannan Moosa Didi, Fazeela Amir
2000	Koadi	"Loabeege Aalam Dhekeyshey"	Sahir, Fathimath Zoona
2000	Koadi	"Neyngeyhen Heelaafaa"	Abdul Hannan Moosa Didi, Fathimath Zoona
2000	Maaburu	"Dheewaanaa Vey Moosun"	Muaviyath Anwar
2000	Namaves	"Insaaneke Mee Dhuniyeygaa"	Meena Saleem
2000	Namaves	"Vaarey Vehen Feshee Ey"	Ali Rameez
2000	Namaves	"Mendhan Veemaa Dhuniye Himeyn Vaaney"	Ali Rameez, Fathimath Rauf
2000	Namaves	"Aalam Mirey Loabeegaa"	Ali Rameez, Fathimath Rauf
2000	Nihaa	"Khiyaalee Vaafashun"	Abdul Hannan Moosa Didi, Fathimath Rauf
2000	Rasrana	"Annanee Fenvaruvan"	Abdul Baaree, Fathimath Zoona
2001	Kan'bulo	"Heelaashey Chaaley Heelaashey"	Ali Rameez
2001	Gulfaam	"Jaadhoogaa Jassaa Dhiwaanaa"	Abdul Baaree
2001	Reyfanaa	"Hey Naahaanan"	Abdul Baaree
2001	Rukkuri 2	"Saadhaa Thi Moonaa Lolaa"	Ali Rameez, Fathimath Zoona
2001	Rukkuri 2	"Loa Numaraa"	Ibrahim Amir, Fazeela Amir
2001	Rukkuri 2	"Ulhunee Haadha Balaigenney"	Fathimath Zoona
2001	Rukkuri 3	"Loabeege Moosun Dhanee Ey"	Umar Zahir
2001	Rukkuri 3	"Karunaige Agu Netheemaa"	Hassan Ilham, Shifa Thaufeeq
2002	Bonus	"Mithuraage Loabi Ran Han'dhaan"	Ali Rameez
2002	Bonus	"Saadhaa Mooney Mooney Thee"	Ali Rameez
2002	Guraha	"Huvafen Dhekeynee"	Ali Rameez, Fazeela Amir
2002	Samaasa	"Neyngi Vevey Ihusaaseh Miee"	Ali Rameez
2002	Vaudhu	"Haadha Loabinney Hinithunvanee"	Ali Rameez
2003	Himeyn Dhanvaru	"Hithaa Hithaa"	Abdul Baaree, Shifa Thaufeeq
2003	Hiyy Roavarun	"Kuran Gandhee Huvaa"	Hassan Ilham, Shifa Thaufeeq
2003	Inthizaarugai - VCD	"Bahdhalu Kollan Annaashey"	Shifa Thaufeeq
2003	Mizaaju	"Buneemaa Dhen Libeyney"	Abdul Hannan Moosa Didi
2003	Mizaaju	"Buneveythoa Buneveythoa"	Abdul Hannan Moosa Didi
2003	Mizaaju	"Hiyy Edheythee Ma Edhemey"	Abdul Hannan Moosa Didi
2003	Mizaaju	"Heeliyas Dhurudhurun"	Abdul Hannan Moosa Didi
2003	Mizaaju	"Erunu Moya Heeve Han'dhu"	Abdul Hannan Moosa Didi
2003	Mizaaju	"Thiya Khiyaal Foheleveyhey"	Abdul Hannan Moosa Didi, Shifa Thaufeeq
2004	Maamuige Reythah	"Hama Neyngey Vee Majuboorey"	Shifa Thaufeeq
2004	Maamuige Reythah	"Kaireegaa Kalaa Netheemaa"	Fathimath Zoona
2004	Qaathil - VCD	"Yaaraa Miee Loabi Heylaa Moosunhey"	Shifa Thaufeeq
2004	Yaaraa	"Hithaa Meygaa Mihaaru"	Ibrahim Amir, Fazeela Amir
2015	Single	"Miss Veyey"	Abdul Hannan Moosa Didi
2018	Hithukeytha	"Hithukeytha Thibaa Hiyanin"	Haamidh Nishan
2018	Hithukeytha	"Aniyaa Dhey Mi Naazuku Dhuniyeygaa"	Haamidh Nishan
2018	Hithukeytha	"Hiyy Ronyaa Ivvaashey"	Haamidh Nishan
2018	Hithukeytha	"Vakivaanehey Vaki Kureveynehey"	Haamidh Nishan
2018	Hithukeytha	"Loa Maraaleemaa"	Haamidh Nishan
2018	Hithukeytha	"Kuru Thin Lafuzun"	Haamidh Nishan
2018	Hithukeytha	"Hiyy Dhen Bunee Madumadunney"	Haamidh Nishan
2018	Hithukeytha	"Manzil Gaathah Ais"	Haamidh Nishan
2018	Hithukeytha	"Maafukuran Dhasveemaa"	Haamidh Nishan
2018	Hithukeytha	"Thi Moonah Belumun"	Haamidh Nishan
2019	Han'dhaan Kurahchey	"Vaafashakun"	Mariyam Ashfa
2019	Han'dhaan Kurahchey	"Konme Hinithunvumeh"	Mumthaz Moosa
2019	Han'dhaan Kurahchey	"Ivey Adu"	Mumthaz Moosa
2019	Han'dhaan Kurahchey	"Haadha Loabiveyey"	Mumthaz Moosa
2019	Han'dhaan Kurahchey	"Ehera Han'dhu Dhenhey"	Mohamed Abdul Ghanee, Mariyam Ashfa
2019	Han'dhaan Kurahchey	"Loa Meriyey"	Haamidh Nishan
2019	Han'dhaan Kurahchey	"Bosdheefaa Dhamun"	Mumthaz Moosa, Mariyam Ashfa
2019	Han'dhaan Kurahchey	"Eynaa"	Rafiyath Rameeza
2020	Single	"Mee Maeh"	Haamidh Nishan, Rafiyath Rameeza
2021	Qatil	"Loaiybakee"	Ahmed Shavin
2021	Qatil	"Heylaa Mihiree"	Ahmed Shavin
2021	Qatil	"Fini Neyvaa"	Ahmed Shavin
2021	Qatil	"Dhuruvaan Beynumiyyaa"	Ahmed Shavin
2021	Qatil	"Huttey Huttey"	Ahmed Shavin
2021	Qatil	"Ulheynee Konheneh"	Ahmed Shavin
2021	Qatil	"Bosdhin Roalhi"	Ahmed Shavin
2021	Qatil	"Thiya Dhelolah Balaalumun"	Ahmed Shavin
2021	Balabalaa Huttaey	"Balabalaa Huttaey"	Haamidh Nishan
2021	Balabalaa Huttaey	"Antharees"	Haamidh Nishan
2021	Balabalaa Huttaey	"Maafu Mi Lafuzakee"	Haamidh Nishan
2021	Balabalaa Huttaey	"Maazeege Bihdhoh"	Abdul Razzaq, Nasheedha
2021	Balabalaa Huttaey	"Qaabil Nuvee Ey"	Ahmed Shavin
2021	Balabalaa Huttaey	"Faithila Beehey"	Ahmed Shavin
2021	Balabalaa Huttaey	"Shabunamun Foavanee"	Ahmed Shavin
2021	Balabalaa Huttaey	"Vindhu"	Hassan Ajuaan
2021	Iuthiraaf	"Aashoakhuvee"	Ahmed Nayaz
2021	Iuthiraaf	"Vakivedhaan"	Ahmed Nayaz
2021	Iuthiraaf	"Thee Hiyanyey"	Ahmed Nayaz
2021	Iuthiraaf	"Thihira Beywafaatherikan"	Ahmed Nayaz
2021	Iuthiraaf	"Fahu Neyvayaa"	Ahmed Nayaz, Aminath Nihaa
2021	Iuthiraaf	"Nuvaaney Salaamaiy"	Ahmed Nayaz, Aminath Nihaa

Religious / Madhaha
Year	Album/Single	Madhaha	Artist(s)
N/A	Al Haqqu	"Thiya Mausoomu"	Rafiyath Rameeza
2019	Aalam	"Leyaa Leyge Gulhumee"	Mumthaz Moosa, Fathimath Rauf, Hassan Aahil
2019	Aalam	"Levey Noonhe Neyvaa"	Aminath Saina Mohamed Rasheedh
2019	Aalam	"Yaa Rabbanaa"	Haamidh Nishan
2019	Aalam	"Thaubaa Vumah Mihiyy Edhi"	Haamidh Nishan
2019	Aalam	"Faalameke Elhunu Aakhirah"	Fathimath Rauf

== Accolades ==
Year	Award	Category	Nominated work	Result	Ref(s)
1994	Aafathis Awards – 1993	Best Director	Naseebu	Won	
1998	Aafathis Awards – 1997	Best Director	Fathis Handhuvaru	Won	
2007	3rd Gaumee Film Awards	Best Director	Fathis Handhuvaru	Nominated	
2016	7th Gaumee Film Awards	Best Lyricist	"Inthizaarey Othee Hiyy Edheythee" – Kuhveriakee Kaakuhey?	Nominated	
