= Ginihila =

- Official film poster
- Directed by: Easa Shareef
- Screenplay by: Easa Shareef
- Starring: Ali Seezan; Mariyam Nisha; Reeko Moosa Manik; Niuma Mohamed
- Cinematography: Ibrahim Wisan
- Edited by: Easa Shareef; Ali Seezan
- Music by: Hussain Sobah
- Production company: EMA Productions
- Release date: January 26, 2003
- Country: Maldives
- Language: Dhivehi

Ginihila is a 2003 Maldivian horror film directed by Easa Shareef. Produced under EMA Productions, the film stars Ali Seezan, Mariyam Nisha, Reeko Moosa Manik and Niuma Mohamed in pivotal roles. The film is an unofficial remake of Vikram Bhatt's Indian horror film Raaz (2002) which itself is an unofficial adaptation of What Lies Beneath.

== Cast ==
- Ali Seezan as Mifzal Amir
- Mariyam Nisha as Sajuna
- Reeko Moosa Manik as Hakeem
- Niuma Mohamed as Suhana
- Sheereen Abdul Wahid as Zeyba
- Aishath Gulfa as Sweydha
- Ibrahim Wisan as Mifzal's friend
- Koyya Hassan Manik as Ibrahim Rafeeu

== Soundtrack ==
Track listing
No.	Title	Lyrics	Singer(s)	Length
1.	"Fun Asaruga"	Easa Shareef	Ali Rameez, Shifa Thaufeeq	5:46
2.	"Haadhahaa Loabivey"	Easa Shareef	Abdul Baaree, Fathimath Zoona	5:37
3.	"Loaibakee Haadhaha"	Easa Shareef	Shifa Thaufeeq	5:30
4.	"Loabimee Jaazubee Foni Asarekey"	Easa Shareef	Abdul Baaree	5:30
5.	"Dhekilan Edheythee"	Easa Shareef	Ali Rameez, Thohira	6:14

== Accolades ==
Year	Award	Category	Recipients	Result	Ref.
2007	Miadhu Crystal Award	Best Visual Effects	Shiyad, Shah	Won	
