= Dheewanaa Hiyy =

Maldivian television series

- Screenplay by: Ibrahim Waheed
- Story by: Ibrahim Waheed; Easa Shareef
- Directed by: Easa Shareef
- Music by: Hussain Sobah
- Country of origin: Maldives
- Original language: Dhivehi
- No. of seasons: 1
- No. of episodes: 5

Production
- Producer: EMA Production
- Cinematography: Ibrahim Wisan
- Editors: Ahmed Shah; Easa Shareef
- Running time: 29–30 minutes

Original release
- Release: 2003

Dheewanaa Hiyy is a Maldivian television series directed by Easa Shareef. Produced by EMA Productions, the series stars Yoosuf Shafeeu, Lufshan Shakeeb and Sheereen Abdul Wahid in lead roles. The series narrates the conflicts between two families due to the resurface of a brief love affair in the past.

== Cast ==
=== Main ===
- Yoosuf Shafeeu as Amir
- Lufshan Shakeeb as Fahud
- Sheereen Abdul Wahid as Maiha
- Koyya Hassan Manik as Naseer
- Fauziyya Hassan as Asima
- Aminath Rasheedha as Shaira
- Hussain Shibau as Ahusan

=== Guest ===
- Ibrahim Wisan as family doctor (Episode 5)

== Episodes ==
No. in season	Title	Directed by
1	"Episode 1"	Easa Shareef
Amir (Yoosuf Shafeeu) relocates to Male' with his mother, Asima (Fauziyya Hassan) and starts working at an office where he befriends with Fahud (Lufshan Shakeeb). A day later, Amir is hired by Fahud's father, Naseer (Koyya Hassan Manik) to work part-time at his shop. Fahud requests Amir to help him resolve his differences with his girlfriend, Maiha (Sheereen Abdul Wahid).
2	"Episode 2"	Easa Shareef
Naseer queries about his past relationship with Asima. She reveals that Amir is a child of Naseer from their two months' marriage. Maiha finds herself more connected with Amir and unwillingly falls in love with him. Maiha becomes confident that Amir shared similar feelings towards her.
3	"Episode 3"	Easa Shareef
Maiha determines to stay with Amir while he decides to move away from her. Sales boy of the shop, Ahusan (Hussain Shibau) exposes their brief affair to Fahud which creates rivalry between the friends. Amir observes a difference in Fahud's behavior.
4	"Episode 4"	Easa Shareef
Amir quits his job at Naseer's shop which resulted in further conflicts between Naseer and Fahud. Maiha tries to reconcile with Amir but he rejects her proposal. Fahud tries every possible way to make Amir's life miserable. He even tries to frame Amir for theft which backfires on him. Shaira eavesdrops a telephone conversation between Naseer and Asima. Shaira confronts Naseer for answers, where he reveals Amir's parenthood.
5	"Episode 5"	Easa Shareef
Shaira refuses to forgive Naseer which creates disputes between them. Amir discovers his parenthood from Fahud. As the whole family was separated into pieces, Fahud realizes that he had been brainwashed by Ahusan and reunites with Amir.

== Soundtrack ==
Track listing
No.	Title	Lyrics	Music	Singer(s)	Length
1.	"Hiyy Dheewaana Dhen Mihaaru"	Easa Shareef	Imthiyaz	Hassan Ilham, Fathimath Rauf	4:06
