= Karunaige Agu =

1990 Maldivian film

- Official film poster
- Directed by: Easa Shareef
- Written by: Mohamed Manik
- Screenplay by: Mohamed Manik; Easa Shareef
- Produced by: Easa Shareef
- Starring: Asad Shareef; Fathimath Nizar; Fathimath Rahma; Easa Shareef
- Cinematography: Hassan Latheef; Amir Ali
- Edited by: Easa Shareef
- Production companies: D.H. Studio; Easa Films
- Release date: 1990
- Running time: 130 minutes
- Country: Maldives
- Language: Dhivehi

Karunaige Agu is a 1990 Maldivian film directed by Easa Shareef. Produced by Shareef under D.H. Studio and Easa Films, the film stars Asad Shareef, Fathimath Nizar, Fathimath Rahma and Easa Shareef in pivotal roles.

== Premise ==
Shahid Shareef (Asad Shareef), an intelligent doctor proposes his colleague, a hardworking nurse, Shiyana (Fathimath Rahma) who accepts him as her love interest despite being hesitant due to their social difference. Meanwhile, his impertinent mother, Shahidha (Fathimath Didi) arranges his marriage with a prideful daughter from a wealthy family, Shehenaz (Fathimath Nizar), whose father, also the step-father of Shahid, financed him with medical education. He gets heartbroken when he hear the news of his marriage being arranged to Shehenaz, though hopeless, he agrees to the wedding. The couples experience infertility and Shahid suggest that his plan for another marriage if his wife cannot conceive a baby for him. Shortly, Shehenaz discovers her husband's affair with Shiyana.

Shahid's father, Muneer (Kaneeru Abdul Raheem), agrees him to marry Shiyana and this initiates a series of hurdles in the family. After the demise of Muneer and Shahidha, Shehenaz dominates in the house and undermines Shiyana at all her attempts. Soon after Shiyana gives birth to a healthy boy, Shahid has to leave abroad for a course. In the meantime, Shehenaz's friend, Ziyad (Easa Shareef) stays in their house. Shehenaz takes the opportunity to plant evidence against her as having an affair with Ziyad. Shiyana, nothing in her defense and none to protect her, is thrown out from Shahid's house.

== Cast ==
- Asad Shareef as Shahid Shareef
- Fathimath Nizar as Shehenaz
- Fathimath Rahma as Shiyana
- Easa Shareef as Ziyad
- Fathimath Didi as Shahidha
- Kaneeru Abdul Raheem as Muneer; Shehenaz's father
- Aishath as Shaaira
- Ahusan
- Sithi Fulhu as Shiyana's grandmother
- Jaleel as Wahid

== Soundtrack ==
Track listing
No.	Title	Lyrics	Singer(s)	Length
1.	"Loaiybey Mithaa Bunevenee Ey"	Kaneeru Abdul Raheem	Abdul Hannan Moosa Didi
2.	"Mifaraaiy Balaabalaashey"	Kaneeru Abdul Raheem	Abdul Hannan Moosa Didi, Shafeeqa Abdul Latheef
3.	"Nikamethi Ehaa Dhera Meehakee"	Kaneeru Abdul Raheem	Shafeeqa Abdul Latheef
4.	"Lavvaashi Rahumathugaa Kalaa"	Kaneeru Abdul Raheem	Shafeeqa Abdul Latheef

== Response ==
The film received mixed reviews from critics, where the performance of the lead actors and the songs by Abdul Hannan Moosa Didi were in particular praised by the critics.
