= Abdul Baaree =

Maldivian singer

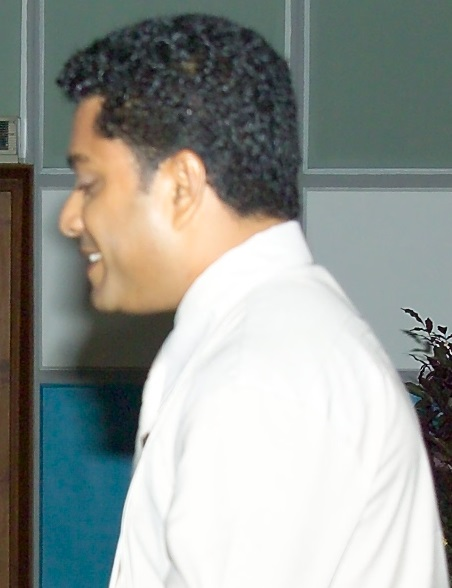
- Baaree receiving the National Award of Recognition, 2005
- Born: Abdul Bari Aboobakur; 20 March 1967 (age 58); B. Fulhadhoo, Maldives
- Occupation: Playback singer
- Years active: 1997–2011
- Musical career
- Genres: Pop; filmi; electronic
- Instrument: Vocals

Abdul Bari Aboobakur commonly spelled as Abdul Baree (20 March 1967) is a former Maldivian singer.

== Career ==
In 1990, Baaree started performing in the "Aksheeba" shows without any charge, which helped in gaining recognition from music lovers. Afterwards, he expanded his presence to other stage shows including "Fannaanunge Muzikee Eid", "Galaxy" and other shows being performed in Male' and atoll islands. He started his professional career as a singer in 1997 by contributing to the studio albums including Mathaaran. Indian classical touch in his rendition, often compared with Bollywood singer Mohammed Rafi, was particularly noted by the music directors which helped him gain several projects within a short period of time. From the year 2000 to 2011, Bari had been a consistent contributor to the soundtrack album of several films.

In 2005, the Government of Maldives honoured him with the National Award of Recognition, which he attributed as his biggest achievement of his career. During the time, he worked as a mentor to the students performing in the Interschool Singing Competition. In the media, he has been noted as a "bubbly performer who brings a smile to the listener with his joyful rendition, except for the emotional songs". Similarly, his live performances are discussed to be enjoyable with his engaging behavior on the stage.

In 2011, Baaree made a public announcement that after listening to a religious documentary titled Maru, he decided to quit music and regret his involvement in the industry. Afterwards, he only performed religious tracks and advised his followers to avoid listening his music. Despite stepping away from the musical scene for personal reasons, many of his songs remain popular even after decades of its release. In 2018, Baaree was ranked third in the list of the "Most Desired Comeback Voices", compiled by Dho?.

== Discography ==
=== Feature film ===
Year	Film	Song	Lyricist(s)	Co-artist(s)	Notes
1999	Umurah	"Ei Reethivi Iru Han'dhuthaaEy"	Boi Ahmed Khaleel	Fathimath Zoona	
2000	Ainbehge Loabi Firiehge Vaajib	"Mithuraa Libumunney"	Adam Haleem Adnan	Solo	
2001	Aaah	"Ma Vaanan Qurubaan"	Adam Haleem Adnan	Solo	
2001	Aaah	"Veynugaa Roalumun"		Fathimath Rauf	
2001	Hiiy Edhenee	"Hiyyves Dhen Fisaari Moyaey" (Version 1)	Easa Shareef	Fathimath Zoona, Abdul Hannan Moosa Didi	
2001	Hiiy Edhenee	"Hiyyves Dhen Fisaari Moyaey" (Version 2)	Easa Shareef	Fathimath Zoona	
2001	Hiyy Heyokuraathi	"Ei Reethivi Iru Han'dhuthaaEy"	Boi Ahmed Khaleel	Fathimath Zoona	Appears in Soundtrack album
2001	Naaummeedhu	"Bappaa Aimaa Aharen Vaa Ufaa"	Mausoom Shakir	Ahmed Nabeel Mohamed	
2001	Naaummeedhu	"Haadha Dheraey"	Mausoom Shakir	Solo	
2002	Loabi Nuvevununama	"Ufalun Kulhelan"		Mariyam Eanash Sinan	Appears in Soundtrack album
2002	Sandhuravirey	"Heyluvaalee Roohaa Shabaabey"	Adam Haleem Adnan	Shifa Thaufeeq	Appears in Soundtrack album
2002	Kahvalhah Dhaandhen	"Mihithun Abadhu Loabi Dhevidhaaney"	Adam Naseer Ibrahim	Fathimath Zoona	
2002	Kahvalhah Dhaandhen	"Ey Fari Maushooqaa"		Solo	
2002	Aan... Aharenves Loabivin	"Aadhey Mirey Loabin"	Jaufar Abdul Rahuman	Solo	
2003	Ginihila	"Dhiriulhumakee Miee Nunimey"	Easa Shareef	Fathimath Zoona	
2003	Ginihila	"Loabi Mee Jaazubee Foni Asarekey"	Easa Shareef	Solo	
2003	Kalaayaanulaa	"Nukerifa Nuhurey Aadhey"	Mausoom Shakir	Shifa Thaufeeq	
2003	Dhonkamana	"Annanee Fenvaruvan"	Easa Shareef	Fathimath Zoona	
2003	Dhonkamana	"Ahaashey Loabivaaey Ahaashey"	Adam Naseer Ibrahim	Shifa Thaufeeq	
2003	Vehey Vaarey Therein	"Nan Bunan Kereynehey"	Easa Shareef	Shifa Thaufeeq	
2003	Vehey Vaarey Therein	"Alhe Alhe Dhoonukurey"	Easa Shareef	Shifa Thaufeeq	Appears in Soundtrack album
2003	Vehey Vaarey Therein	"Aadhey Nikan Loabin Ekugaa Nashaalan"		Solo	Appears in Soundtrack album
2004	Sandhuravirey 2	"Masthee Dhehiyy"	Ahmed Haleem	Shifa Thaufeeq	
2004	Eynaa	"Loabin Thi Loabin"	Ahmed Nashidh (Dharavandhoo)	Aishath Inaya	
2005	Handhu Keytha	"Thi Farudhaa Nagaashey"		Shifa Thaufeeq	
2005	Zuleykha	"Bappage Loa Foodhi Karuna"	Mausoom Shakir	Mariyam Eanash Sinan	
2005	Hureemey Inthizaarugaa	"Visnaa Visnaa Hoadhaa Hoadhaa"	Easa Shareef	Shifa Thaufeeq	
2006	Hukuru Vileyrey	"Vaathi Fari Loa"	Ahmed Nashidh (Dharavandhoo)	Mariyam Rifqa	
2008	Yoosuf	"Ivvenee Haaley"	Mausoom Shakir	Solo	
2008	Yoosuf	"Loabivan Aharen Malikaa Ey"	Adam Haleem Adnan	Solo	Appears in Soundtrack album
2009	Udhabaani	"Han'dhuvaruge Alikan Libey"		Fathimath Zoona	
2009	Udhabaani	"Kalhufoige Reythah Gunan" (Duet Version)		Fathimath Zoona	
2009	Baaraige Fas	"Thi Loabi Noon Loaiybakah"	Ahmed Nashidh (Dharavandhoo)	Shifa Thaufeeq	
2009	Loaiybahtakaa	"Hiyy Nagaafaa Ma Dhineemaa"	Adam Haleem Adnan	Rafiyath Rameeza	
2009	Loaiybahtakaa	"Shaairekey Thee Beynunvey Khiyaal"		Rafiyath Rameeza	Appears in Soundtrack album
2010	Mi Hiyy Keekkuraanee?	"Fun Araamekey Thibaage Loaibakee"		Aishath Inaya	
2010	Mi Hiyy Keekkuraanee?	"Kairivelanthoa Kairi Kurey"	Ahmed Nashidh (Dharavandhoo)	Moonisa Khaleel	
2010	Dhin Veynuge Hithaamaigaa	"Saahibaa"	Hussain Sobah	Rafiyath Rameeza	
2011	Laelaa	"Fari Nala Thibaage Soora"		Shifa Thaufeeq	

=== Short films ===
Year	Film	Song	Lyricist(s)	Co-artist(s)
2001	Juhaage Buhdhi	"Chaalu Paree Aashoakhu Kuree"		Solo
2006	Salhibe	"Raaguthakun Foni Roohee"	Adam Haleem Adnan	Fathimath Zoona

=== Television ===
Year	Title	Song	Lyricist(s)	Co-artist(s)
2000	Dhoapatta	"Hadhiyaa Badhal Vanee Ey"	Kopee Mohamed Rasheedh	Shifa Thaufeeq
2004	Dhanmaanu	"Gulzaarakee Thiyey"		Shifa Thaufeeq

=== Non-film songs ===
Year	Album/single	Song	Lyricist(s)	Co-artist(s)
1995	Hiyyfahi 2	"Zuvaan Zuvaan Hiyy Magey"		Fazeela Amir
1997	Mathaaran	"Dheefaa Hiyy Dhiyaimaa"		Solo
1997	Mathaaran	"Hairaanvey Soora Vanee Ey"		Mariyam Shiham
1997	Raahi	"Kaaku Dhekeynee Baakeevee"	Kopee Mohamed Rasheed	Solo
1998	Foni Karuna	"Mihithaa Furaana Edhenee"	Kaneeru Abdul Raheem	Fazeela Amir
1998	Foni Karuna	"Beynumey Nubunan Ulhenyaa"		Fazeela Amir
1998	Foni Karuna	"Loabeege Miee Shakuvaa"		Solo
1999	Adhaarasam	"Loabin Othee Thi Un'gugaa"		Solo
1999	Dhirun	"Firumunee Faalhugaa"	Kaneeru Abdul Raheem	Solo
1999	Dhirun	"Nuhureveyneyey Roaneyey Roaneyey"	Easa Shareef	Fazeela Amir
1999	Fariyaadhu	"Mithuraa Libumunney"	Adam Haleem Adnan	Solo
1999	Farumaan	"Adhu Mee Vaavaru"		Solo
1999	Raaya	"Bunelaadheynveehey"		Solo
1999	Shikaara	"Mibinmatheega Kaaku Oyaalee"	Ahmed Shakeeb	Solo
1999	Shikaara	"Loa Merin Fenifaa Edhigen"	Ahmed Shakeeb	Shifa Thaufeeq
1999	Vara	"Veynee Shakuvaa Ey"	Kopee Mohamed Rasheed	Solo
1999	Vara	"Fajuru Tharihen Vidhaalaathee"	Kopee Mohamed Rasheed	Fazeela Amir
2000	Hissaa	"Aan' Ey Mee Loabi Yaaraa"		Solo
2000	Hiyala	"Aadhey Mirey Hevilaa"		Solo
2000	Hiyala	"Saafu E Han'dhuvaru"		Athifa Aboobakuru
2000	Inthihaa	"Aadhey Mirey Loabin"	Jaufar Abdul Rahuman	Solo
2000	Khareef	"Ma Vaanan Qurubaan"	Adam Haleem Adnan	Solo
2000	Khareef	"Chaalu Paree Aashoakhu Kuree"		Solo
2000	Laat	"Hoadhaa Balamey"	Abdulla Afeef	Solo
2000	Rasrana	"Annanee Fenvaruvan"	Easa Shareef	Fathimath Zoona
2000	Rasrana	"Saafu Naazukuvi Dhehithey"	Adam Haleem Adnan	Fazeela Amir
2000	Muraka	"Fennanee Mihiyy Edhey"		Fathimath Zoona
2000	Muraka	"Foadhemundhaa Gulshan Chaaloo"		Fazeela Amir
2000	Muraka	"Veythuvun Edhi Thiya Yaaruge Un'gugaa"	Adam Haleem Adnan	Shifa Thaufeeq
2000	Rivethi	"Dheynuhey Kalaa"	Adam Haleem Adnan	Shifa Thaufeeq
2000	Rivethi	"Hadhiyaa Badhal Vanee Ey"	Kopee Mohamed Rasheed	Shifa Thaufeeq
2000	Rivethi	"Me Dheefaa Hiyy Badhal Vee"	Kopee Mohamed Rasheed	Solo
2000	Thoonu	"Ithubaaru Kohfaa Huree"	Mausoom Shakir	Solo
2000	Thoonu	"Hiyygaimey Haadhahaa Kalaa"	Mausoom Shakir	Fazeela Amir
2000	Thoonu	"Beynumey Javaabeh Dheyn"	Mausoom Shakir	Fazeela Amir
2001	Aimina	"Dheyshey Ruheyshey"	Mohamed Rasheedh (Annaarey)	Solo
2001	Aimina	"Kalaa Heekuranee"	Mohamed Rasheedh (Annaarey)	Fathimath Rauf
2001	Baaodi	"Faalhuga Loabi Uvaalaa Dhiyumun"	Hussain Sobah	Solo
2001	Boduraalhu	"Govijje Nadhuru Mirey"		Aishath Inaya
2001	Fattaru	"Thiya Aee Alun Gulhenhey"	Ismail Shakeeb	Fathimath Zoona
2001	Fattaru	"Dhin Sazaayaa Veynugaa"	Ismail Shakeeb	Solo
2001	Gulfaam	"Jaadhoogaa Jassaa Dhiwaanaa"	Easa Shareef	Solo
2001	Gulfaam	"Ey Kathilaifiyey Hiyy Magey"	Adam Naseer Ibrahim	Solo
2001	Gulfaam	"Edhemey Libey Araamu"	Adam Haleem Adnan	Shifa Thaufeeq
2001	Haasil	"Dheyn Vaaneyey"		Rafiyath Rameeza
2001	Haasil	"Visnaalaashey Vaanee"		Solo
2001	Huvafen	"Loabeege Beynun Netheemaa"		Solo
2001	Mendhan	"Zuvaan Leyaai Masthu Masthu"	Ahmed Shakeeb	Solo
2001	Muthee	"Abadhu Edheythee"	Adam Haleem Adnan	Fazeela Amir
2001	Muthee	"Guraafulhu Magey"		Solo
2001	Nayaa	"Loabeegaa Ma Dhen"		Shifa Thaufeeq
2001	Nayaa	"Vaaloabi Mee Ey Ahaashey"		Solo
2001	Nayaa	"Thee Han'dhey"		Solo
2001	Reyfanaa	"Hey Naahaanan"	Easa Shareef	Solo
2001	Rukkuri 3	"Mulhi Hiyy Ekee Oyaalaa"	Ahmed Nashidh (Dharavandhoo)	Aishath Inaya
2001	Rukkuri 3	"Kuri Khiyaalee Khiyaalee Sooraekey"		Solo
2001	Rukkuri 3	"Naasiraa Gaadhiraa" (Sagiko Ad)		Fathimath Zoona
2001	Shoakh	"Zuvaan Hitheh Mi Meyga Vey"	Ahmed Sharumeel	Fathimath Rauf
2001	Tharaanaa	"Mithuraaey Keiytherivaashey"	Adam Haleem Adnan	Fathimath Zoona
2002	Anaa	"Loabi Kuraa Hiyy Vey"		Fathimath Zoona
2002	Dhanvaru	"Hoorekey Thee Dheyshe Heelaa"	Ahmed Nashidh (Dharavandhoo)	Solo
2002	Dhonmanje	"Mihithun Abadhu Loabi Dhevidhaaney"	Adam Naseer Ibrahim	Fathimath Zoona
2002	E' Kamanaa	"Thiya Loabeege Athun"	Ismail Mubarik	Shaheedha Riffath
2002	Hulhevi Han'dhu	"Neiy Ufaa Bahaarekey"		Solo
2002	Jazbaath	"Ekuga Hin'gaalan Dhaahithey Vanee"	Mausoom Shakir	Solo
2002	Jazbaath	"Thee Manziley"	Adam Naseer Ibrahim	Solo
2002	Khanjaru	"Kollee Zakham Zuvaan Hithey"	Adam Naseer Ibrahim	Solo
2002	Leykokaa	"Farivee Chaaloo Leykokaa"	Kopee Mohamed Rasheedh	Solo
2002	Leykokaa	"Fennanee Mihiyy Edhey"		Fathimath Zoona
2002	Lily	"Hama Thedhekey Oagaavey"		Solo
2002	Loabi	"Beynumey Loabi Haadha Kollaidheyn"	Boi Ahmed Khaleel	Shifa Thaufeeq
2002	Moahiru	"Eyrugaves Yaqeen Kohdhineemey"	Ismail Mubarik	Solo
2002	Moahiru	"Rovey Haalu Gislaa"	Ahmed Abdulla	Solo
2002	Oivaru	"Hunnanveehey Maayooseegaa"		Solo
2002	Paruvaana	"Dhen Neydhen Kuran Inthizaaru"	Easa Shareef	Fathimath Rauf
2002	Paruvaana	"Dheynamey Jaanaai Roohaa"	Kaneeru Abdul Raheem	Rafiyath Rameeza
2002	Ran Han'dhu	"Maafu Kureveynehey Foohiveemaa"		Solo
2002	Ran Han'dhu	"Ran Han'dhakun Dhey Han'dhuvarun"		Solo
2002	Reethi Abadhuves Reethi	"Gislaa Roveyne Noonhey"		Solo
2002	Samaasa	"Nuthemeyshey"	Abdulla Muaz Yoosuf	Shifa Thaufeeq
2002	Thun'di	"Kathive Baaru Dhiyaimaa"		Solo
2002	Vaa Vaa	"Aimaa Bunelaanamey"	Ahmed Nashidh (Dharavandhoo)	Solo
2002	Vadhaau	"Fari Thari Thari Dhillaalaathee"	Hamdhoon Hameedh	Suweydha Ibrahim
2002	Vadhaau	"Mihiyy Adhu Dhinee"	Hamdhoon Hameedh	Solo
2002	Vaudhu	"Ey Fari Maushooqaa"		Solo
2003	Billoori	"Hiyy Amey Bunan"	Ahmed Nashidh (Dharavandhoo)	Fazeela Amir
2003	Billoori	"Reyrey Ekanive Hoadheemey"	Ahmed Nashidh (Dharavandhoo)	Fazeela Amir
2003	Fathevare	"Thihan'dhaan Vumun Rovenee Ey"		Solo
2003	Kinaaree	"Ahaashey Loabivaaey Ahaashey"	Adam Naseer Ibrahim	Shifa Thaufeeq
2003	Kinaaree	"Khabaru Balamaa"		Solo
2003	Himeyn Dhanvaru	"Hithaa Hithaa"	Easa Shareef	Shifa Thaufeeq
2003	Hiyy Roavarun	"Abadhuves Bunanee"		Solo
2003	Laal Heeraa	"Nudhey Nudhey Ey Nan Bunedhee"		Aishath Shahudha
2003	Laal Heeraa	"Disco Lavaset"		Shifa Thaufeeq, Hassan Ilham, Mukhthar Adam
2003	Laal Heeraa	"Enmenah Haamavaahen"		Solo
2003	Laal Heeraa	"Gulzaarakee Thiyey"		Shifa Thaufeeq
2003	Loabi Loabin	"Hiyy Furidhaathee Ey"	Ahmed Saleem	Shaheedha Mohamed
2003	Loabi Loabin	"Hiyy Edhi Govaa Edhumakee"	Ahmed Saleem	Fazeela Amir
2003	Loabi Loabin	"Abadhu Kalaa Thi Dhey Ufaa"	Ahmed Saleem	Fathimath Zoona
2003	Rama	"Ey Chaalu Nayaa Fari Mooney"		Solo
2003	Rose Marry	"Ahaashey Fariyaadhu Aashiqaa"	Adam Haleem Adnan	Solo
2003	Rasmaa	"Thi Farudhaa Nagaashey"		Shifa Thaufeeq
2003	Rasmaa	"Mee Hiyydhathivi Vaguthekey"		Solo
2004	Dhonaa	"Mastheevi Ufaa Dheyshey" (Version 1)		Solo
2004	Dhonaa	"Mastheevi Ufaa Dheyshey" (Version 2)		Solo
2004	Ehan'dhaanugai...	"Dheyshey Thi Asaru"		Solo
2004	Fari Kan'bulo	"Nikan Hin'gaa Mashaa Ekee"	Ahmed Haleem	Solo
2004	Fari Kan'bulo	"Masthee Dhehiyy"	Ahmed Haleem	Shifa Thaufeeq
2004	Hiyy	"Fini Fini Masthee Vayaa"	Adam Haleem Adnan	Fazeela Amir
2004	Hooru	"Beynun Beynun"		Shifa Thaufeeq
2004	Ihusaas	"Kiyaadhevvavaa Zuvaaneh Kobaa"	Adam Haleem Adnan	Fathimath Zoona
2004	Jaadhooga Jeheyne	"Hayaathugaa Libenvaa"	Abdul Muhaimin	Fazeela Amir
2004	Jaadhooga Jeheyne	"Jaadhoogaa Jeheynehey"	Adam Haleem Adnan	Fazeela Amir
2004	Maamuige Reythah	"Thihithaa Mihithaa Mivaa Gulhun"	Abdul Hameedh	Shaheedha Mohamed
2004	Maamuige Reythah	"Magey Mithuraa"	Abdul Hameedh	Solo
2004	Mariyaadhu	"Fissanee Mihiyythoa"		Fathimath Zoona
2004	Saahil	"Loabin Thi Loabin"	Ahmed Nashidh (Dharavandhoo)	Aishath Inaya
2004	Thibaa	"Kuri Hadhiyaa Kobaahe"	Ahmed Nashidh (Dharavandhoo)	Fathimath Zoona
2004	Single	"Vidhaali Gothun En'gune Han'dhuvaru"		Solo
2004	Vidhaathari	"Reetheege Mi Laamaseel"	Abdul Muhaimin	Solo
2004	Vidhaathari	"Han'dhuvaruge Reethi Moosun Mee"	Abdul Muhaimin	Fazeela Amir
2004	Yaaraa	"Fisvanee Fisvanee"	Ahmed Nashidh (Dharavandhoo)	Zuhura Waheedh
2004	Yaaraa	"Thee Bunan Chaalu Nayaa Hooruparee"	Ahmed Nashidh (Dharavandhoo)	Solo
2004	Zamaan	"Reethi Fari Hoorey Thiee"	Boi Ahmed Khaleel	Solo
2004	Zamaan	"Dhauruvi Maazee"	Boi Ahmed Khaleel	Solo
2005	Dhilaasaa	"Mihiyy Adhu Dhevijjey"	Adam Haleem Adnan	Shifa Thaufeeq
2005	Fari Goma	"Thiyaee Amaazu"	Adam Haleem Adnan	Shifa Thaufeeq
2005	Fari Goma	"Naazukee Magey Magey"		Solo
2005	Fari Goma	"Vanee Sooraekey"		Solo
2005	Fura Dhanvaru	"Kairin Fenumun Yaaraa"	Shareefa Fakhry	Shifa Thaufeeq
2005	Fura Dhanvaru	"Hama Thiyey Zuvaanvee Yaaraa"	Shareefa Fakhry	Zuhura Waheedh
2005	Hiyy Dheefaa	"Hiyy Dheefaa Dhaneethoa Ey"	Adam Haleem Adnan	Shifa Thaufeeq
2005	Maahiyaa	"Lafzeh Neiy Hithugaa"	Ahmed Shakeeb	Solo
2005	Maahiyaa	"Vindhaa Hiyy Magey"	Adam Naseer Ibrahim	Solo
2005	Maahiyaa	"Meyge Vindhaa Hithaa"	Adam Haleem Adnan	Shifa Thaufeeq
2005	Loabi Viyas	"Thiya Loaiybah Oiy Ithubaarakee"	Mohamed Shamin	Shaheedha Mohamed
2005	Vakivi Hin'dhu	"Loabi Neiynamaee E Hithugaa"	Adam Naseer Ibrahim	Solo
2005	Vakivi Hin'dhu	"Hiyy Nufilaathoa"	Adam Naseer Ibrahim	Solo
2005	Yaa Habeys	"Thadhu Mihithun Filaanehey"		Solo
2005	Yaaraa 2	"Ey Gomaa"	Ahmed Nashidh (Dharavandhoo)	Fathimath Rauf
2005	Yaaraa 2	"Hutteythoa Kalaa"	Ahmed Nashidh (Dharavandhoo)	Fathimath Zoona
2005	Zuvaanaa	"Theeyey Hoadhaa Mithuraa Chaalu"	Adam Haleem Adnan	Fathimath Zoona
2005	Zuvaanaa	"Neyngi Hiyy Dhooviyey"	Adam Haleem Adnan	Shaheedha Riffath
2005	Zuvaanaa	"Han'dhakee Thee Hiyy Edhey"		Fazeela Amir
2005	Zuvaanaa	"Just Chill Chill"		Mariyam Unoosha
2006	Dhenves...	"Alhe Loabeege Nukurey Samaasaa"	Adam Haleem Adnan	Mariyam Rifqa
2006	Fari Dheyliyaa	"Jaanu Dhemey Bune Noonhey"		Shifa Thaufeeq
2006	Hiyy Dheewaanaa 3	"Beynunvey Adhu Ekugaa"	Shareefa Fakhry	Moonisa Khaleel
2006	Jism	"Yaaru Hiyy Edhey"	Adam Haleem Adnan	Aishath Inaya
2006	Keehve..?	"Ran'galhey Alhe Enme Ran'galhey"	Adam Naseer Ibrahim	Fazeela Amir
2006	Keehve..?	"Fun Loaiybeh Eba Aalaavey"	Adam Naseer Ibrahim	Solo
2006	Keehve..?	"Thihira Themenee Noonbaa"		Solo
2006	Kisthee	"Mithuraaey Hiyy Hulhuvaalaa"	Adam Haleem Adnan	Fathimath Zoona
2006	Mihan'dhaanugai...	"Dhaanvee Hemun"	Yoosuf Mohamedfulhu	Solo
2006	Mi Hithun	"Raaguthakun Foni Roohee"	Adam Haleem Adnan	Fathimath Zoona
2006	Single	"Aavedhaathee Han'dhaan"		Solo
2006	Yaaraa 3	"Asthaa Mihiyy Beynunveyey"	Ahmed Nashidh (Dharavandhoo)	Mariyam Unoosha
2006	Yaaraa 3	"Yaqeen Ma Kuramey"	Ahmed Nashidh (Dharavandhoo)	Solo
2006	Yaaraa 3	"Thoonu Lolaa Burusoora Beleemaa"	Ahmed Nashidh (Dharavandhoo)	Fathimath Zoona
2006	Yaaraa 3	"Seedhaa Thiyahen Dhen Nubalaashey"	Ahmed Nashidh (Dharavandhoo)	Fathimath Zoona
2006	Yaaraanulaa	"Mihithaa Nafsaa Roohu"		Solo
2007	Salaamey...	"Naazunee O Magey Naazunee"	Ahmed Nashidh (Dharavandhoo)	Moonisa Khaleel
2007	Thihan'dhaanugai...	"Dhin Mi Nazarugaa"	Hussain Rasheedh	Solo
2007	Single	"Iraa Han'dhu Dhauru Kurumun"	Maumoon Abdul Gayyoom	Solo
2008	Beywafaa Viyas	"Fun Araamekey Thibaage Loaiybakee"		Aishath Inaya
2008	Hiyy Dheewaanaa 4	"Kairivelanthoa Kairi Kurey"	Ahmed Nashidh (Dharavandhoo)	Moonisa Khaleel
2008	Hiyy Dheewaanaa 4	"Hissu Dhey Filaa"	Shareefa Fakhry	Fathimath Zoona
2008	Hiyy Dhemey Loabin	"Hiyy Dhemey Loabin Zuvaanaa"	Adam Haleem Adnan	Mariyam Rifqa
2008	Hiyy Dhemey Loabin	"Hiyy Ronee Ey Keiyvaaneyhey"	Adam Haleem Adnan	Solo
2008	Hiyy Dhoovee	"Thiya Chaalu Paree"		Solo
2008	Hiyy Sihenee	"Mihithugaa Kalaa Vey"	Adam Haleem Addnan	Shifa Thaufeeq
2008	Thihan'dhaanugai Remix	"Hithaa Kulhelaifi Jaan"		Solo
2009	Adhives... Loabivey	"Hiyy Dhen Dheyshey"		Solo
2009	Adhives... Loabivey	"Miyey Loabeege Hadhiyaa"		Shifa Thaufeeq
2009	Fari Kamana	"Aadhey Aadhey"	Ahmed Haleem	Aminath Nashidha
2009	Fari Kamana	"Jaanaa Hiyyves Dheynamey"	Ahmed Haleem	Solo
2009	Fari Kamana	"Balaa Hiyy Vaaney"	Ahmed Haleem	Solo
2009	Hiyy Dheebalaa 2	"Accident Kohfathaa"	Ahmed Nashidh (Dharavandhoo)	Fathimath Zoona
2009	Nazaaraa	"Magey Loabi Hibain"	Zaraana Zareer	Shifa Thaufeeq
2009	Nazaaraa	"Kuranee Ekeegaa Samaasaa"	Zaraana Zareer	Shifa Thaufeeq
2009	Nazaaraa	"Dhin Thibaa Veyn"	Zaraana Zareer	Solo
2009	Yaaraa 4	"Alhe Heyonuvaane Adhu Nubalaa"	Ahmed Nashidh (Dharavandhoo)	Mariyam Rifqa
2009	Yaaraa 4	"Vaathi Fari Loa"	Ahmed Nashidh (Dharavandhoo)	Mariyam Rifqa
2009	Yaaraa 4	"En'geyhey En'geyhey"	Ahmed Nashidh (Dharavandhoo)	Solo
2009	Yaaraa 4	"Thi Burusoora Fenifaa"	Ahmed Nashidh (Dharavandhoo)	Fathimath Zoona
2011	Vasmeeru	"Kastholhu Elhuney"		Solo
2012	Loabivumakee	"Kalaa Thee Bunan Furihama Mithurey"	Ismail Shameem	Fathimath Zoona
2013	Hiyy Dheebalaa 3	"Naazunee O Magey Naazunee"	Ahmed Nashidh (Dharavandhoo)	Moonisa Khaleel
2018	Han'dhakee Thee Hiyy Edhey	"Saahibaa"	Hussain Sobah	Rafiyath Rameeza
2018	Han'dhakee Thee Hiyy Edhey	"Han'dhakee Thee Hiyy Edhey"		Rafiyath Rameeza

=== Religious / Madhaha ===
Year	Album/single	Madhaha	Lyricist(s)	Co-artist(s)
N/A	Alinooru	"Yaa Rabbanaa"		Solo
2010	Dhuaa	"Yaa Zal Jalaal"	Adam Haleem Adnan	Solo
2010	Dhuaa	"Dhinnavaan'dhey Mi Alhaa Faafathakun"	Adam Haleem Adnan	Solo
2014	Ihuge Lhen 2: Waqth	"Naanaa"		Solo

== Accolades ==
Year	Award	Category	Nominated work	Result	Ref(s)
2005	National Award of Recognition	Performing Arts - Singing		Won	
2007	1st Miadhu Crystal Award	Best Male Playback Singer	"Beynunvey Adhu Ekuga" - Hiyy Dheewana 3	Won	
