= Dhonkamana =

- Official film poster
- Directed by: Amjad Ibrahim
- Written by: Moosa Saaid
- Screenplay by: Moosa Saaid; Amjad Ibrahim; Yoosuf Shafeeu
- Starring: Yoosuf Shafeeu; Fauziyya Hassan; Sheela Najeeb; Sheereen Abdul Wahid; Amira Ismail; Niuma Mohamed
- Cinematography: Ibrahim Wisan
- Edited by: Ahmed Amir
- Production company: EMA Productions
- Release date: June 2, 2003
- Running time: 124 minutes
- Country: Maldives
- Language: Dhivehi

Dhonkamana is a 2003 Maldivian horror film directed by Amjad Ibrahim. Produced under EMA Productions, the film stars Yoosuf Shafeeu, Sheela Najeeb, Fauziyya Hassan, Niuma Mohamed, Amira Ismail and Sheereen Abdul Wahid in pivotal roles.

== Premise ==
Shahil (Yoosuf Shafeeu) decides to marry his girlfriend, Zaana (Sheela Najeeb) despite his mother's disapproval who planned to wed her son to her friend Zahidha's daughter, Anoosha (Amira Ismail). Shahil, however married Zaana and brought her to his home who in spite of her righteousness became tormented by her mother-in-law and Shahil's sister. She died during pregnancy and Shahil decided to relocate himself to an uninhabited island occupying himself in agriculture. There he meets an old lady, Kuda Dhaitha (Fauziyya Hassan) who agreed to take the job as a cook in the island where an unexpected romantic relationship grows between them.

== Cast ==
- Yoosuf Shafeeu as Shahil
- Sheela Najeeb as Zaana
- Niuma Mohamed as Zaana
- Fauziyya Hassan as Kuda Dhaitha
- Ibrahim Wisan as Shakeeb
- Waleedha Waleed as Shahil's sister
- Sheereen Abdul Wahid as Zoona
- Amira Ismail as Anoosha
- Aminath Rasheedha as Haleema
- Neena Saleem as Haleema's sister

== Soundtrack ==
Track listing
No.	Title	Lyrics	Music	Singer(s)	Length
1.	"Annanee Fenvaruvan"	Easa Shareef	Feeali Abdulla Waheedh	Abdul Baaree, Fathimath Zoona
2.	"Ahaashey Loabivaaey Ahaashey"	Adam Naseer Ibrahim	Haady	Abdul Baaree, Shifa Thaufeeq
3.	"Naazukee Balaalun"	Easa Shareef		Abdul Hannan Moosa Didi, Fathimath Zoona
4.	"Thiya Khiyaal Foheleveyhey?"	Easa Shareef	Hussain Sobah	Shifa Thaufeeq, Abdul Hannan Moosa Didi
5.	"Dheyn Ufaavaaney"	Adam Haleem Adnan	Haady	Mukhthar Adam, Shifa Thaufeeq
