= Abdul Hannan Moosa Didi =

Maldivian singer, composer and producer

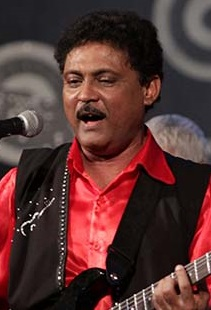
- Born: 13 June 1959 (age 66); Male', Maldives
- Occupations: Playback singer; music composer; producer
- Years active: 1977–present
- Spouse: Aishath Ali Manik
- Musical career
- Genres: Pop; filmi; electronic
- Instrument: Vocals

Abdul Hannan Moosa Didi (13 June 1959) is a Maldivian singer, music composer and producer.

== Early life and career ==
At the age of seventeen, Didi started performing casually with his friends which helped him develop self-confidence and improve his singing capabilities. In 1977, he was offered a stage performance in a tourist resort to celebrate one of their occasions, which resulted in him getting several offers. During the time, he was more keen to perform English language songs than Hindustani classical songs. Apart from singing, he has also contributed to the industry by composing original music and tracks for films, albums and events. One of his most acclaimed music composition includes "Kaiveneege Amaazu" from the film Haali.

In 1983, the Government of Maldives honoured her with the National Award of Recognition, which makes him the fourth male singer to receive this honour. In the Aafathis Awards ceremony held in 1998, he received the Best Male Playback Singer Award for his performance in the song "Leygaa Vaathee Nan" from the film Fathis Handhuvaru (1997), which was widely appreciated for his possession of high vocal range in the song. At the 4th Gaumee Film Awards ceremony, Hannan was bestowed as the Best Male Playback Singer for his classical rendition of the song "Ossifavaa Iru Eree Ey" from the film Edhi Edhi Hoadheemey (2003). He received his second nomination in the same category for the title song of Kuhveriakee Kaakuhey? (2011) at the 7th Gaumee Film Awards.

After relocating to Sri Lanka, Hannan slowly distanced himself from the industry, though during the time he served as the producer of the film Kuhveriakee Kaakuhey? which directed by his wife, Aishath Ali Manik. A film he considered as a "family production" was theatrically released in 2011, though the film was written in 2007 by their two daughters Hawwa Alishan and Ulvy. Inspired by Ram Gopal Varma's Bollywood horror romantic thriller film Darling (2007), the film revolves around a man who cheats on his wife with his secretary, and how his life slides to a haunting shift when he accidentally kills his mistress. Upon release, the film received negative response from critics and was declared a flop at box office. Apart from producing the film, he contributed to the soundtrack album of films including Kuhveriakee Kaakuhey? which also resulted in him being nominated in the Best Original Song composition for the title track of the film.

== Discography ==
=== Feature films ===
Year	Film	Song	Lyricist(s)	Co-artist(s)	Notes
1984	Haali	"Kaiveneege Amaazu Kamugaa"	Aminath Faiza (Deyzeemaa)	Solo	Deleted Song
1985	Fidhaa	"Kiyaadhey Mi Raagunney"	Yoosuf Mohamedfulhu	Fathimath Rauf	
1987	Ikhthiyaaru	"Iquraaru Kobaahey"	Yoosuf Mohamedfulhu	Mahumoodha Shakeeb	
1987	Ikhthiyaaru	"Meygaavi Alikuri Noorakee Maley"	Yoosuf Mohamedfulhu	Mahumoodha Shakeeb	
1987	Maqsadh	"Hithuge Loabeege Nan"	Abdul Hannan Moosa Didi	Solo	
1987	Maqsadh	"Han'dhuvaru Dhey Reyrey"	Abdul Hannan Moosa Didi	Solo	
1989	Nufolhey Maa	"Uthureythee Kiyaadhey Miee Bayaaney"	Chilhiya Moosa Manik	Fathimath Rauf	
1990	Karunaige Agu	"Loaiybey Mithaa Bunevenee Ey"	Kaneeru Abdul Raheem	Solo	
1990	Karunaige Agu	"Mifaraaiy Balaabalaashey"	Kaneeru Abdul Raheem	Shafeeqa Abdul Latheef	
1990	Loabi '90	"Hithuge Vindhey Avas Vedhanee"	Easa Shareef	Sofoora Khaleel	
1992	Dhon Manma	"Dhenthoa Hurin Mirey Dhen Khabar"	Abdul Hannan Moosa Didi	Sama Abbas	
1994	Zakham	"Nunetheyne Asaru Mihithun"	Abdul Hannan Moosa Didi	Solo	
1994	Zakham	"Nan Adhu Mihithugaa Thi Noonee Nuvey"	Mariyam Waheedha	Mariyam Waheedha	
1994	Zakham	"Khiyaalugaa Hissaavelaa"	Mariyam Waheedha	Mariyam Waheedha	
1994	Zakham	"Thi Dhulun Nubune Khiyaalu Kuraneehey"	Mariyam Waheedha	Mariyam Waheedha	
1994	Zakham	"Thuraa Veynun"	Mariyam Waheedha	Solo	
1994	Nafrathu	"Sirru Sirrunhey Bunanvee"	Ali Shameel	Suveydha Ibrahim	
1994	Nafrathu	"Libemun Midhaa Aniyaa"	Ali Shameel	Solo	
1994	Nafrathu	"Goanaa Kollaafaa Kalaa"	Ali Shameel	Sofa Thaufeeq	
1994	Nafrathu	"Rankula Jehi Loabi Thi Firumumun"	Ali Shameel	Sofa Thaufeeq	
1995	Dhehithehge Loabi	"Bunedhen Mihen Thihan'dhaanugaa"	Ahmed Sharumeel	Solo	
1995	Dhehithehge Loabi	"Thadhuvee E Libey Aahun"	Ahmed Sharumeel	Solo	
1995	Dhehithehge Loabi	"Vaaloabi Meehey"	Ahmed Sharumeel	Solo	
1995	Dhushman	"Aavaa Udhaahey"	Ahmed Sharumeel	Fathimath Zoona	
1996	Edhuvas Hingajje	"Ma Edhey Wafaa Dheveyne Yaarakee"	Easa Shareef	Solo	
1996	Edhuvas Hingajje	"Kalaa Aeemaa Han'dhaa Iru"	Easa Shareef	Solo	
1996	Hagu An'bi	"Aavaahaa Fari Soora Ey"	Ahmed Sharumeel	Solo	
1996	Hagu An'bi	"Dhusheeme Loabi Yaarekey"	Ahmed Sharumeel	Fathimath Iraadhaa	
1996	Hagu An'bi	"Mi Leygaa Baaru Hin'ganee"	Hussain Rameez	Solo	
1996	Badhal	"Thaazaa Ufaa Vee Ey"	Tharaboozu Ahmed Riza	Fathimath Zoona	
1996	Badhal	"Nulibey Ufaa Hoadhan"	Easa Shareef	Solo	
1996	Huras	"Reygaa Khiyaal Kureemey"	Jaufar Abdul Rahuman	Fathimath Zoona	
1996	Huras	"Ehan'dhaan Hithun Filuveynebaa"	Jaufar Abdul Rahuman	Solo	
1996	Huras	"Fisve Jaanaai Hithaa"	Jaufar Abdul Rahuman	Solo	
1996	Huras	"Reygaa Khiyaal Kureemey" (Slow Version)	Jaufar Abdul Rahuman	Solo	
1997	Loabeega Aniyaa	"Saahibaa"	Hussain Sobah	Shifa Thaufeeq	
1997	Diary	"Dhaairu Mi Dhuaa Ey"	Ahmed Sharumeel	Solo	
1997	Diary	"Heelaashey Kalaa Loabivaa"	Ahmed Sharumeel	Solo	
1997	Diary	"Hiyy Mi Milkey"	Ahmed Sharumeel	Fathimath Zoona	
1997	Diary	"Khiyaal Mihithugaa Sirreh"	Ahmed Sharumeel	Shifa Thaufeeq	
1997	Fathis Handhuvaru	"Leygaa Vaathee Nan"	Easa Shareef	Solo	Aafathis Award for Best Male Playback Singer
1997	Fathis Handhuvaru	"Uff Heevanee"	Easa Shareef	Fathimath Zoona	
1997	Fathis Handhuvaru	"Boa Vehey Vaareyaa"	Easa Shareef	Shifa Thaufeeq	
1997	Fathis Handhuvaru	"Fathis Han'dhuvaru Hekivedheyney"	Easa Shareef	Saahir	
1998	Ethoofaaneerey	"Gasthugaa Geydhoshun"	Ahmed Sharumeel	Solo	
1998	Ethoofaaneerey	"Eyru Dhinhaa Ufaa"	Ahmed Shakeeb	Rafiyath Rameeza	
1998	Ethoofaaneerey	"Thilolun Saafuvee"	Easa Shareef	Shifa Thaufeeq	
1998	Sirru	"Moosun Haaufaa"	Kaneeru Abdul Raheem	Fazeela Amir	
1999	Qurbaani	"Heylaa Hunnanveemaa Maafkurey"	Easa Shareef	Shifa Thaufeeq	
1999	Loabiveriyaa	"Eynaa Miadhu Heevey Fennaaney"	Mariyam Waheedha	Solo	
1999	Loabiveriyaa	"Ufaa Neiy Hayaathey Miee" (Male Version)	Mariyam Waheedha	Solo	
1999	Loabiveriyaa	"Hithuge Khiyaal Asaru Vaathee" (Male Version)	Mariyam Waheedha	Solo	
1999	Loabiveriyaa	"Kuraathee Khiyaalu Maa Loabin"	Mariyam Waheedha	Mariyam Waheedha	
1999	Viraashaa	"Vanee Haas Neyvaa"	Easa Shareef	Fathimath Zoona	
2000	Maazee	"Dhirihureemey Mithaa"	Boi Ahmed Khaleel	Shifa Thaufeeq	
2000	2000 Vana Ufan Dhuvas	"Fini Roalhi Beehenee Ey"	Easa Shareef	Fazeela Amir	
2000	2000 Vana Ufan Dhuvas	"Balaanumelaa Dhevey Magakun"	Easa Shareef	Solo	
2000	Zalzalaa	"Hunnanveehey Mikhiyaalugaa"	Aishath Ali Manik	Solo	
2000	Zalzalaa	"Mee Zalzalaathaa"	Abdul Hannan Moosa Didi	Solo	
2000	Emme Fahu Dhuvas	"Heeviyey Hithuge Haraarathu"	Saikuraa Ibrahim Naeem	Solo	
2000	Emme Fahu Dhuvas	"Gulhifaa Kan'daa Vaahen"	Easa Shareef	Solo	
2000	Emme Fahu Dhuvas	"Neyvaa Olhey Hiyyves Thelhey"	Easa Shareef	Fathimath Zoona	
2000	Emme Fahu Dhuvas	"Neyngeyhen Heelaafaa"	Easa Shareef	Fathimath Zoona	
2000	Shaalinee	"Vakivun Mihiyy"	Mariyam Waheedha	Mariyam Waheedha	
2001	Hilihilaa	"Edhemey Inkaaru Nuvun"	Abdul Hannan Moosa Didi	Solo	
2001	Hiiy Edhenee	"Hiyy Edhenee" (Duet Version)	Easa Shareef	Fathimath Zoona	
2001	Hiiy Edhenee	"Hiyyves Dhen Fisaari Moyaey" (Version 1)	Easa Shareef	Fathimath Zoona, Abdul Baaree	
2001	Hiiy Edhenee	"Hiyy Edhenee" (Male Version)	Easa Shareef	Solo	
2003	Dhonkamana	"Naazukee Balaalun"	Easa Shareef	Fathimath Zoona	
2003	Dhonkamana	"Thiya Khiyaal Foheleveyhey"	Easa Shareef	Shifa Thaufeeq	
2003	Edhi Edhi Hoadheemey	"Ossifaavaa Iru Eree Ey"	Kopee Mohamed Rasheedh	Shifa Thaufeeq	Best Male Playback Singer
2003	Edhi Edhi Hoadheemey	"Dhila Hoonugaa"	Kopee Mohamed Rasheedh	Fathimath Rauf	
2003	Edhi Edhi Hoadheemey	"Abadhaa Abadhu Hinithun Vumey"	Kopee Mohamed Rasheedh	Solo	
2004	Hatharu Udhares	"Vefaa Othee Dhen Kon Kushehbaa Ey"	Easa Shareef	Shifa Thaufeeq	
2011	Hithey Dheymee	"Huvafenthakey Dhekkee Kalaa"	Easa Shareef	Solo	
2011	Kuhveriakee Kaakuhey?	"Nubune Keehhey Kuraanee"	Abdul Hannan Moosa Didi	Solo	
2011	Kuhveriakee Kaakuhey?	"Nuruhifaa Dhuruga Dhen"	Abdul Hannan Moosa Didi	Solo	
2011	Kuhveriakee Kaakuhey?	"Aharenves Loabivin" (Sad Version)	Abdul Hannan Moosa Didi	Solo	
2011	Kuhveriakee Kaakuhey?	"Aharenves Loabivin"	Abdul Hannan Moosa Didi	Shifa Thaufeeq	Nom: Best Male Playback Singer Nom: Best Original Song
2011	Kuhveriakee Kaakuhey?	"Khiyaalee Vaafashun"	Easa Shareef	Fathimath Rauf	
2011	Kuhveriakee Kaakuhey?	"Inthizaarey Othee Hiyy Edheythee"	Easa Shareef	Solo	

=== Television ===
Year	Title	Song	Lyricist(s)	Co-artist(s)
1997	Ummeedhu	"Roashan Folhemundhaa"	Fathimath Nahula	Solo
1997-1999	Kahthiri	"Mee Himeyn Dhanvaru"	Easa Shareef	Shifa Thaufeeq
1997-1999	Kahthiri	"Mendhanve Himeyn Veemaa"	Ahmed Sharumeel	Solo
1998	Kulheybeybe	"Mihiyy Ekee Fanaavanee"	Fathimath Nahula	Shifa Thaufeeq
1999	Thadhu Thedhu Huvafen	"Hiyy Dheewaanaa"	Kopee Mohamed Rasheed	Shifa Thaufeeq
2000	Gas Neyngey Maa	"Dhekey Hithey Abadhu Vanee"	Ahmed Nashidh (Dharavandhoo)	Solo
2000	Kashithanmathi	"Nudheybalaa Alhaanulaa"	Fathimath Nahula	Fathimath Zoona
2003	Dheewaanaa	"Ummeedhu Aavefaa Vanee"	Kopee Mohamed Rasheedh	Shifa Thaufeeq

=== Non-film songs ===
Year	Album/single	Song	Lyricist(s)	Co-artist(s)
—	—	"Ahaashe Yaaraa Oagaave Dhin Mee"		Solo
—	—	"Amaazu Hoadhaa Jaan Dheveyney"		Solo
—	—	"Netheehey Pyaaru Loabin"		Solo
—	—	"Ohey Shabnam"		Solo
—	—	"Gulhi Thiya Dhaashey"		Solo
—	—	"Marey Mithuraa"		Solo
—	—	"Kiyaadheyshey Hithuge Araamey"		Solo
—	—	"Qaumahtakaa Adhu Visnaalamaa"		Solo
—	—	"Eid Aee Hinithunvamun"		Mohamed Rashadh
—	—	"Balamun Midhaa Sofuhaathakun"		Mahumoodha Shakeeb
—	—	"Hiyaa Reethi Libifaavee"		Mahumoodha Shakeeb
—	—	"Than Dheyshie Mithuraa Ey"		Mahumoodha Shakeeb
—	—	"Hiyy Dhoa Gulhunee Ey"	Yoosuf Mohamedfulhu	Fathimath Rauf
—	—	"Nunidhaa Reyaa Dhuvaalugaa"		Solo
—	—	"Dhinveynuge Hithaamaigaa"	Abdul Hannan Moosa Didi	Shifa Thaufeeq
N/A	DIB - 1	"Dhulakun Huvaa Mi Kuranee"	Yoosuf Mohamedfulhu	Solo
N/A	DIB - 1	"Dhaanvee Hemun"	Yoosuf Mohamedfulhu	Solo
N/A	DIB - 1	"Meygaavi Alikuri Noorakee Maley"	Yoosuf Mohamedfulhu	Mahumoodha Shakeeb
N/A	DIB - 1	"Kuraa Khiyaalakee Thiya Ey"		Solo
N/A	DIB - 1	"Edheythee Chaandhaneemaathoa"		Fathimath Rauf
N/A	Hulhevi Han'dhu	"Aahugaa Balaalee"		Solo
N/A	Hulhevi Han'dhu	"Dhanvaru, Bala Kotareega Bandhuvee"	Ahmed Sharumeel	Ruksana Ilyas
N/A	Finifenmaa	"Loabeegaa Hitheh Zakhamu Vejjeyyaa"		Solo
1990	Galaxyge Therein 1	"Fun Asaru Kuri Fun Asaru"		Mahumoodha Shakeeb
1991	Galaxyge Therein 2	"Loaiybah Magey Oiy Ithubaaru Kobaahey"		Fathimath Rauf
1991	Galaxyge Therein 2	"Hithuga Vaathee Veemey Fidhaa"		Fathimath Rauf
1991	Galaxyge Therein 2	"Hiyy Meygaa Vaathee"		Fathimath Rauf
1991	Galaxyge Therein 2	"Koathaafathugaa Veethi Nishaan"		Mahumoodha Shakeeb
1992	Galaxyge Therein 3	"Loaiybey Loaiybey Fidhaavegen"		Fathimath Rauf
1993	Beylaa-1	"Nan Adhu Mihithugaa"	Mariyam Waheedha	Mariyam Waheedha
1993	Beylaa-1	"Miee Reyrey Asarugaa"	Mariyam Waheedha	Mariyam Waheedha
1993	Beylaa-1	"Khiyaalugaa Hissaavelaa"	Mariyam Waheedha	Mariyam Waheedha
1993	Beylaa-1	"Thi Dhulun Nubune Khiyaalu Kuraneehey"	Mariyam Waheedha	Mariyam Waheedha
1993	Beylaa-1	"Loabi Gulzaaru Therey"	Mariyam Waheedha	Mariyam Waheedha
1993	Beylaa-1	"Dhey Miee Saafu Bayaan"	Mariyam Waheedha	Solo
1993	Beylaa-1	"Thuraa Veynun"	Mariyam Waheedha	Solo
1993	Beylaa-1	"Fun Nazaru Jaadhuvee Reyrey"	Mariyam Waheedha	Solo
1993	Beylaa-1	"Numedheyme Asaru Mihithun"	Abdul Hannan Moosa Didi	Solo
1993	Beylaa-1	"Aadhey Mithuraa"	Abdul Hannan Moosa Didi	Solo
1994	Beywafaa	"Fenifayey Balan Mihuree"	Easa Shareef	Shifa Thaufeeq
1994	Dhassoora	"Thihen Nudhaashey"	Fathimath Nahula	Solo
1994	Dhassoora	"Roashan Folhemundhaa"	Fathimath Nahula	Solo
1994	Dhassoora	"Vaudhu Uvaalevi Dhiyaeehey"	Fathimath Nahula	Aminath Ibrahim
1994	Dhassoora	"Vindhu Jahaathee Kiyaadhemey"	Fathimath Nahula	Shifa Thaufeeq
1994	Dhassoora	"Kalaa Huvaakoh Thihen Bunaaney"	Fathimath Nahula	Shifa Thaufeeq
1994	Dhassoora	"Nudheybalaa Alhaanulaa"	Fathimath Nahula	Shifa Thaufeeq
1994	Dhassoora	"Hoadhenee Ey Hoadhenee"	Fathimath Nahula	Shifa Thaufeeq
1994	Dhassoora	"E Keehvehey Nivaavamun"	Fathimath Nahula	Fathimath Zoona
1994	Galaxyge Therein 5	"Kerivaa Loabi"		Solo
1994	Galaxyge Therein 5	"Fini Hiyalugaa"	Yoosuf Mohamedfulhu	Moonisa Khaleel
1994	Galaxyge Therein 5	"Adhu Hithuge Khiyaalakee"		Mahumoodha Shakeeb
1994	Galaxyge Therein 5	"Roaneyhe Gislaa Amudhun Mihaaru"		Solo
1995	Aniyaa	"Hiyy Edheythee Ma Edhemey"	Easa Shareef	Solo
1995	Aniyaa	"Loabin Kalaage Raaey Dhin"	Easa Shareef	Solo
1995	Aniyaa	"Kastholhunney Kalaa"	Easa Shareef	Solo
1995	Aniyaa	"Jaanuge Faruvaa Dheefiyey"	Easa Shareef	Solo
1995	Dhanvaru	"Nudhaashe Loabeegaa Fikuru"		Shifa Thaufeeq
1995	Falivalhu	"Beynumey Dheynamey"	Fathimath Nahula	
1995	Falivalhu	"Mihiyy Ekee Fanaavanee"	Fathimath Nahula	Shifa Thaufeeq
1995	Falivalhu	"Dheefaa Thi Loabi Faalhukurey"	Fathimath Nahula	Shifa Thaufeeq
1995	Falivalhu	"Aadhey Loabin Keehhe Vee Kuran"	Fathimath Nahula	Aminath Ibrahim
1995	Falivalhu	"Kuraahaa Dhuaa Mee"	Fathimath Nahula	Solo
1995	Gagunas	"Fenifaa Mooney Kaali Alhaalee"	Kopee Mohamed Rasheedh	Solo
1995	Gagunas	"Kaireegaa Viyas"	Kopee Mohamed Rasheedh	Shifa Thaufeeq
1995	Gagunas	"Vumun Beywafaa"	Kopee Mohamed Rasheedh	Shifa Thaufeeq
1995	Hiyfahi 2	"Mirey Beehileemaa"	Easa Shareef	Fazeela Amir
1995	Thaubeer	"Call Ey Call Ey"		Solo
1995	Thaubeer	"Dhinee Faalhugaa Loa"	Easa Shareef	Solo
1995	Thaubeer	"Biruverikan Vey"	Easa Shareef	Solo
1995	Thaubeer	"Samaasaa Samaasaathakun"	Easa Shareef	Sofa Thaufeeq
1995	Thaubeer	"Faalhuga Hiyy Mi Dhenee"	Easa Shareef	Shifa Thaufeeq
1996	Dheewaanaa	"Kalaage Khiyaaluge Foni Inthizaaru"	Hussain Rameez	Solo
1996	Dheewaanaa	"Thuraa Vanee Ey"		Sofa Thaufeeq
1996	Fiyavahi	"Moosun Haaufaa"		Fazeela Amir
1996	Fiyavahi	"Ninjeh Lolah Naey"		Solo
1996	Fiyavalhu	"Hithugaa Thinan Vaathee"	Easa Shareef	Solo
1996	Fiyavalhu	"Dheewaanaa Kuraa Baarun"	Easa Shareef	Fathimath Zoona
1996	Fiyavalhu	"Vaavaru Miee"	Fathimath Nahula	Fathimath Zoona
1996	Goanaa	"Saahibaa"	Hussain Sobah	Shifa Thaufeeq
1996	Maayoos	"Dhen Dhen Hithaa Loaiybah"	Ahmed Shakeeb	Fathimath Zoona
1996	Maayoos	"Dhin Thadhaa Veynaa Sazaa"	Ahmed Shakeeb	Solo
1996	Maayoos	"Hithuga Vee Dhirumey Kalaa"	Ahmed Shakeeb	Solo
1996	Maayoos	"Thee Ey Magey Wafaatherivi Raanee"	Ahmed Shakeeb	Shifa Thaufeeq
1996	Misraab	"Hithugaey Loabin Vikaafaa"	Easa Shareef	Shifa Thaufeeq
1996	Misraab	"Thunfathaa Moonaa Lolaa"	Easa Shareef	Shifa Thaufeeq
1996	Misraab	"Dheyshey Hithuge Maqaam"	Easa Shareef	Fathimath Zoona
1996	Misraab	"Gelluvaalee Ey Thi An'dhireege Himeynkan"	Easa Shareef	Fathimath Zoona
1996	Misraab	"Mihenvee Furaanaiga Dhirumeh Hureemaa"	Easa Shareef	Solo
1996	Misraab	"Huvafenthakey Dhekkee Kalaa"	Easa Shareef	Solo
1996	Misraab	"Loabi Loabin Salaam"	Easa Shareef	Solo
1996	Ranmuiy	"Thiya Moonah Balaalaa"	Sofa Thaufeeq	Sofa Thaufeeq
1996	Ranmuiy	"Ladhugannanee"	Sofa Thaufeeq	Sofa Thaufeeq
1996	Ranmuiy	"Moosun Mi Edhey Chaal"	Sofa Thaufeeq	Sofa Thaufeeq
1996	Sahaaraa	"Furi Loa Dhanee"	Easa Shareef	Shifa Thaufeeq
1996	Shakuvaa	"Heelun Thi Foruvee Ladhunhey"	Ahmed Shakeeb	Fazeela Amir
1996	Shakuvaa	"Nazaruthoa Foruvanee Raanee"	Ahmed Shakeeb	Solo
1996	Udhares	"Hiyy Oyaalaathoa Kalaa"	Easa Shareef	Fathimath Zoona
1996	Udhares	"Ey Nuforuvaa Khazaanaa"	Easa Shareef	Fathimath Zoona
1996	Udhares	"Kollee Nagaafaa Samaasaa"	Easa Shareef	Fathimath Zoona
1996	Udhares	"E Loabeege Raanee"	Easa Shareef	Solo
1996	Udhares	"Hiyy Magey Adhu Halaaku Vaathee Ey"	Easa Shareef	Solo
1996	Udhares	"Ma Kurin Huree Nuangaashey"	Easa Shareef	Solo
1996	Udhares	"Dhehiyy Gulhunee Kihaa Loabin"	Easa Shareef	Solo
1996	Udhares	"Kalaa Dhuh Fahunney Thedhey"	Easa Shareef	Solo
1996	Udhares	"Fun Hinithunvun"	Ahmed Sharumeel	Solo
1996	Udhares	"Hithuge Naazuku Govumey"	Ahmed Sharumeel	Solo
1997	Alivilun	"Oh My Love"	Easa Shareef	Solo
1997	Alivilun	"Mihaaru Nuruhey"	Easa Shareef	Solo
1997	Alivilun	"Inkaaru Kuran Seedhaa"	Easa Shareef	Fathimath Zoona
1997	Alivilun	"Dhookurey Keekey"	Easa Shareef	Fathimath Zoona
1997	Alivilun	"Sahaaraa Edhey Libeythoa Huree"	Easa Shareef	Zuhura Waheedh
1997	Alivilun	"Hifaa Hiyy Loabin Vanee"	Fathimath Nahula	Shifa Thaufeeq
1997	Beyqaraar	"Gasthugaa Geydhoshun"		Solo
1997	Dhunfini	"Reethi Moonu Beehilan"		Solo
1997	Dhunfini	"Thaashive Hasheegaa"		Solo
1997	Dhunfini	"Reethi Moonaa Nazaru Milkuveethoa"	Tharaboozu Ahmed Riza	Solo
1997	Eheege Adu	"Fari Gothakah Balaalaafa"	Kopee Mohamed Rasheedh	
1997	Faruvaa	"Faruvaadhee Faruvaadhee"	Ahmed Haleem	Shifa Thaufeeq
1997	Faruvaa	"Ufaa Libi Dhaneethaa"		Shifa Thaufeeq
1997	Huvan'dhu	"Farudhaa Nagaabalaashey"		Solo
1997	Kurunees	"Ladhunhe Loa Maaraanulaashey"	Easa Shareef	Solo
1997	Raahi	"Beynunvaa Khiyaalu Bunedheyshey"	Kopee Mohamed Rasheedh	Shifa Thaufeeq
1997	Raahi	"Hayaathun Mi Maamui"	Kopee Mohamed Rasheedh	Shifa Thaufeeq
1997	Raalhu	"Eloaiybakun Ehan'dhaanun"	Tharaboozu Ahmed Riza	Solo
1997	Raalhu	"Ishqu Dheyhun Nuvey"	Tharaboozu Ahmed Riza	Solo
1997	Raalhu	"Dheloa Vanee Mammaa Ey"	Tharaboozu Ahmed Riza	Shifa Thaufeeq
1997	Raalhu	"Yaarunney Kiyaadhenee Ey"	Tharaboozu Ahmed Riza	Fathimath Zoona
1997	Ranthari	"Faalhuveemaa Buneythoa"	Sofa Thaufeeq	Sofa Thaufeeq
1997	Ranthari	"Saadhaa Thi Mooney"	Sofa Thaufeeq	Sofa Thaufeeq
1997	Ranthari	"Yaaraa O Yaaraa"	Sofa Thaufeeq	Sofa Thaufeeq
1997	Sarindhaa	"Sirru Sirrun Kuri Ishaaraaiy"	Easa Shareef	Fazeela Amir
1997	Sarindhaa	"Haadha Edhen Kairin Dheken"	Easa Shareef	Fazeela Amir
1997	Thasveeru	"Dhanvaraku Vehunu Vaareygaa"		Fathimath Zoona
1997	Thasveeru	"Hithi Hithi Gothehgaa Mihaaru"		Solo
1998	Aawaaraa	"Asthaa Geyah Dhaanvee Ey"	Easa Shareef	Shifa Thaufeeq
1998	Foni Karuna	"Moosun Badhal Vedhaaney"		Shifa Thaufeeq
1998	Foni Karuna	"Hiyy Meygavee Meygavee"		Solo
1998	Foni Karuna	"Edhey Thiya Moonu Hithugaa"		Solo
1998	Foni Zaharu	"Ey Nuruhunvee Dhoa"	Easa Shareef	Fazeela Amir
1998	Foni Zaharu	"Mee Namugaa Vaguthee Shaairekey"	Easa Shareef	Solo
1998	Foni Zaharu	"Neenaa Aadhey Neenaa"	Easa Shareef	Solo
1998	Foni Zaharu	"Insaafeh Loabeegaa Nethey"	Easa Shareef	Solo
1998	Foni Zaharu	"Umurah Nidhan Mi Dheloa Meree"	Easa Shareef	Solo
1998	Foni Zaharu	"Inthizaarey Othee Hiyy Edheythee"	Easa Shareef	Solo
1998	Foni Zaharu	"Thilolun Saafuvee"	Easa Shareef	Shifa Thaufeeq
1998	Foni Zaharu	"Ninjeh Naadhey Hairaanvaahaa Hoonuveyey"	Easa Shareef	Shifa Thaufeeq
1998	Foni Zaharu	"Shukuriyaa Hama Shukuriyaa"	Easa Shareef	Shifa Thaufeeq
1998	Foni Zaharu	"Naazukee Balaalun"	Easa Shareef	Fathimath Zoona
1998	Juhaage Handi	"Aadhey Handee" (Version 1)		Solo
1998	Juhaage Handi	"Aadhey Handee" (Version 2)		Solo
1998	Juhaage Handi	"Libidhin Mi Ufaa"		Solo
1998	Juhaage Handi	"Dhiyaee Ey Mammaa"		Solo
1998	Juhaage Handi	"Bala Kulhelaa Migothugaa"		Shifa Thaufeeq
1998	Kuran'gi	"Vaa Foni Asaru"		Fazeela Amir
1998	Kuran'gi	"Hoadhamaa Fenidhaanebaa"		Sofa Thaufeeq
1998	Kurikeela	"Reydhuvaa Dhey Eki Irushaadhu"	Kopee Mohamed Rasheedh	Solo
1998	Kurikeela	"Vee Kon Kushehhe Bunedhee"	Kopee Mohamed Rasheedh	Solo
1998	Kurikeela	"Vamey Hithuge Haalee Thereygaa"	Kopee Mohamed Rasheedh	Aminath Ibrahim
1998	Kurikeela	"Ummeedhu Aavefaa Vanee"	Kopee Mohamed Rasheedh	Shifa Thaufeeq
1998	Meeraa	"Thin Rey Gayaave Hoadheemey"	Kopee Mohamed Rasheedh	Shifa Thaufeeq
1998	Meeraa	"Ihi Kan'dhuraa Nayaa Reethi"	Kopee Mohamed Rasheedh	Solo
1998	Randhoadhi	"Finikan Mihithah Dhey Mithuraa Ey"		Solo
1998	Randhoadhi	"Vee E Iquraaruthah"	Tharaboozu Ahmed Riza	Shifa Thaufeeq
1998	Randhoadhi	"Saafu Roohee Nazarakun"		Fathimath Zoona
1998	Redhan	"Ey Kalaa Hifaanuhey"	Kopee Mohamed Rasheedh	Fathimath Zoona
1998	Redhan	"Fenvilaa Vey Mirey"	Kopee Mohamed Rasheedh	Aminath Ibrahim
1998	Redhan	"Khiyaal Kuraakan"	Kopee Mohamed Rasheedh	Aminath Ibrahim
1998	Redhan	"Kalaa Vakiveemaa"	Kopee Mohamed Rasheedh	Solo
1998	Redhan	"Raanee Dhon"	Kopee Mohamed Rasheedh	Solo
1998	Thaureef	"Heylaa Hunnanveemaa Maafkurey"	Easa Shareef	Shifa Thaufeeq
1999	Farumaan	"Seedhaa E K Hiyaa Libey"		Fathimath Rauf
1999	Farumaan	"Amunaalevey Mee Lafuzey"		Fathimath Rauf
1999	Itthifaaq	"Dhen Mee Dhoovi Hithekey"	Ahmed Sharumeel	Zahiyya Thaufeeq
1999	Itthifaaq	"Soaniyaa Magey Aadhey"	Ahmed Sharumeel	Zahiyya Thaufeeq
1999	Jalparee	"Kuraathee Khiyaalu Maa Loabin"	Mariyam Waheedha	Mariyam Waheedha
1999	Jalparee	"Ufaa Neiy Hayaathey Miee"	Mariyam Waheedha	Mariyam Waheedha
1999	Kastholhu	"Adugadha Nukuraashey"	Easa Shareef	Fathimath Zoona
1999	Kastholhu	"Vanee Haas Neyvaa"	Easa Shareef	Fathimath Zoona
1999	Kastholhu	"Rulhin Dhen Noolheyshey"	Easa Shareef	Fathimath Zoona
1999	Kastholhu	"Foaraanehey Baaru"	Easa Shareef	Fathimath Zoona
1999	Kastholhu	"Hithugaavaa Loabi Dheynee Aimaey"	Easa Shareef, Abdul Hannan Moosa Didi	Fathimath Zoona
1999	Kastholhu	"Hiyy Mi Thelhilaaneyey"		Fathimath Zoona
1999	Mahinoor	"Nufeni Ulheneehey Kalaa"	Kopee Mohamed Rasheedh	Solo
1999	Mahinoor	"Maazee Veemaa Moosun Aaroa"	Kopee Mohamed Rasheedh	Solo
1999	Mahinoor	"Dhila Hoonekey Aavee"	Kopee Mohamed Rasheedh	Shifa Thaufeeq
1999	Raayaa	"Govaalee Loabin"	Tharaboozu Ahmed Riza	Fathimath Zoona
1999	Vakivun	"Mi Mehefil Vidhaa Reyrey"	Mariyam Waheedha	Mariyam Waheedha
1999	Vakivun	"Ekeegaa Kureegaa"	Mariyam Waheedha	Mariyam Waheedha
1999	Vakivun	"Hoonuvanee Ley Mi Hin'gaa"	Mariyam Waheedha	Mariyam Waheedha
1999	Vakivun	"Edhenyaa Vebalaashey"	Mariyam Waheedha	Mariyam Waheedha
1999	Vakivun	"Thiyey Meyge Hoonakee"	Mariyam Waheedha	Mariyam Waheedha
1999	Vakivun	"Vakivun Mihiyy"	Mariyam Waheedha	Mariyam Waheedha
1999	Vakivun	"Mey Sissaa Finikollaahaa"	Mariyam Waheedha	Mariyam Waheedha
2000	Gumree	"Milkey Kalaa Veythoa"		Solo
2000	Hinithun	"Hiyy Kuraa Shakuvaa"		Solo
2000	Inthihaa	"Gaathunney Dhushee"		Fazeela Amir
2000	Koadi	"Fini Roalhi Beehenee Ey"	Easa Shareef	Fazeela Amir
2000	Koadi	"Neyngeyhen Heelaafaa"	Easa Shareef	Fathimath Zoona
2000	Maazee	"Dhirihureemey Mithaa"	Boi Ahmed Khaleel	Shifa Thaufeeq
2000	Maazee	"Ekugaa Maruvun Mee"		Solo
2000	Namaves	"Kahchaave Huvaa"		Solo
2000	Nihaa	"Khiyaalee Vaafashun"	Easa Shareef	Fathimath Rauf
2000	Sahaaraa 2	"Kuraashey Mi Loabin Ulheynee Samaasaa"		Zuhura Waheedh
2001	Shoakh	"Vai Baaru Ehaa Veemaa"	Ismail Abdul Qadhir	Fathimath Zoona
2002	Dhanvaru	"Haasvee Eynaa Nuruhumun"	Ahmed Nashidh (Dharavandhoo)	Solo
2002	Single	"Ruhenyaa Loabidhee"	Ahmed Nashidh (Dharavandhoo)	Fazeela Amir
2003	Mizaaju	"Buneveythoa Buneveythoa"	Easa Shareef	Solo
2003	Mizaaju	"Hiyy Edheythee Ma Edhemey"	Easa Shareef	Solo
2003	Mizaaju	"Heeliyas Dhurudhurun"	Easa Shareef	Solo
2003	Mizaaju	"Erunu Moya Heeve Han'dhu"	Easa Shareef	Solo
2003	Mizaaju	"Thiya Khiyaal Foheleveyhey"	Easa Shareef	Shifa Thaufeeq
2003	Mizaaju	"Iraadhaigaa Huree Viyyaa"	Ahmed Nashidh (Dharavandhoo)	Solo
2003	Mizaaju	"Loabiviyyaa Eloabi Maves Vaanamey"	Mukhthar Fahumee	Solo
2003	Mizaaju	"Buneemaa Dhen Libeyney"		Solo
2003	Mizaaju	"Reethee Hama Reethee"	Abdul Hannan Moosa Didi	Solo
2003	Mizaaju	"Milkuveenama Hiyala Huvaey"	Ahmed Didi (AIHA)	Solo
2003	Reehchey Thi Moonu	"Lakka Visnaa Bunanhe Yaaraa Ey"		Shifa Thaufeeq
2003	Reehchey Thi Moonu	"Fenifaa Mashah Balaey Mihaaru"		Shifa Thaufeeq
2003	Reehchey Thi Moonu	"Dhurunuvaashey Jaanaa"		Shifa Thaufeeq
2003	Tho	"Vejjey Ma Hairaan Ey Zuvaanaa"	Ahmed Nashidh (Dharavandhoo)	Thoahira
2003	Tho	"Thibaa Netheemaa Keiynuvaaney"		Thoahira
2003	Tho	"Ninjeh Naadhey"	Abdul Hannan Moosa Didi	Solo
2003	Tho	"Kuraahaa Khiyaalakee Thiyaey"	Abdul Hannan Moosa Didi	Solo
2003	Tho	"Nudhey Loabi Aisha"	Abdul Hannan Moosa Didi	Solo
2004	Ehan'dhaanugai...	"Dhiruvaashe Vaanee"		Solo
2005	Ehan'dhaanugai...	"Loabeege Gulshanah"	Ibrahim Shihab	Solo
2009	Hiyy Dheebalaa 2	"Hiyy Dheyn Dhey"		Solo
2012	Eid Mubarak 2012	"Eid Salaam Kuramaahey"	Abdul Hannan Moosa Didi	Solo
2012	Eid Mubarak 2012	"Eid Ey Aee"	Abdul Hannan Moosa Didi	Solo
2015	Single	"Miss Veyey Hama Miss Veyey"	Easa Shareef	Solo
2017	Celebrating 20	"Obage Mathaken"		Shashinee
2018	Single	"Dhivehi Qaumah Salaamaiy Edhenyaa"		Solo
2020	Single	"Waqthakee Nikanme Gaaiy Ehchekey"		Solo
2020	Single	"Nurakkaatheri Corona In Miadhu"		Solo
2025	Eid Mubarak 1446	"Ufaaveri Ekuveri Eidh Eh Mee"	Abdul Hannan Moosa Didi	Shifa Thaufeeq, Asim Thaufeeq, Lileetha Massoodh

== Accolades ==
Year	Award	Category	Nominated work	Result	Ref(s)
1984	National Award of Recognition	Performing Arts - Singing		Won	
1998	Aafathis Awards - 1997	Best Male Playback Singer	"Leygaa Vaathee Nan" - Fathis Handhuvaru	Won	
2007	4th Gaumee Film Awards	Best Male Playback Singer	"Ossifavaa Iru Eree Ey" - Edhi Edhi Hoadheemey	Won	
2012	2nd Maldives Film Awards	Best Lyrics	"Dhin Veynuge Hithaamaigaa" -Dhin Veynuge Hithaamaigaa	Won	
2015	6th Gaumee Film Awards	Best Lyricist	"Dhin Veynuge Hithaamaigaa" -Dhin Veynuge Hithaamaigaa	Nominated	
2016	7th Gaumee Film Awards	Best Male Playback Singer	"Kuhveriakee Kaakuhey?" - Kuhveriakee Kaakuhey?	Nominated	
2016	7th Gaumee Film Awards	Best Original Song	"Kuhveriakee Kaakuhey?" - Kuhveriakee Kaakuhey?	Nominated	
