= Vaudhu =

- Directed by: Yoosuf Rafeeu
- Written by: Yoosuf Rafeeu; Easa Shareef
- Screenplay by: Easa Shareef
- Produced by: Ibrahim Dawood
- Starring: Yoosuf Rafeeu; Mariyam Shakeela
- Cinematography: Mohamed Rasheed
- Edited by: Yoosuf Rafeeu; Mohamed Amsad
- Music by: Abdulla Waheed; Back Music: Mohamed Rashad
- Production company: Bukhari Films
- Release date: 1993
- Country: Maldives
- Language: Dhivehi

Vaudhu is a 1993 Maldivian drama film written and directed by Yoosuf Rafeeu. Produced by Ibrahim Dawood under Bukhari Films, the film stars Yoosuf Rafeeu and Mariyam Shakeela in lead roles. The film was an unofficial remake of Raj Kapoor's romantic drama film Bobby (1973).

== Premise ==
Afzal (Yoosuf Rafeeu), a young man from a wealthy family returns to the Maldives for a study-break and meets Fazla (Mariyam Shakeela), daughter of Shareefa (Sithi Fulhu), the woman who worked as a servant in his house during his childhood. Afzal invites Fazla for a celebration party being hosted for him to which Fazla did not appear noting the difference in their societal standards. Afzal starts an affair with Fazla while his mother disapproves the relationship and arranges his marriage with another girl from a reputed family, Sheryna.

== Cast ==
- Yoosuf Rafeeu as Afzal
- Mariyam Shakeela as Fazla
- Abdul Raheem Rashad as Ishmath Abdul Majeed
- Arifa Ibrahim as Sheereena
- Easa Shareef as Fazla's brother
- Athifa as Sheryna
- Sithi Fulhu as Shareefa
- Koyya Hassan Manik as Abdul Ghafoor
- kaafa as Hussain Manik

== Soundtrack ==
Track listing
No.	Title	Lyrics	Music	Singer(s)	Length
1.	"Inthihaa Keiykurun"	Easa Shareef	Abdulla Waheedh (Feeali)	Abdulla Waheedh (Feeali)
2.	"Signal Dhehithun Dhey Buneveynehey"	Easa Shareef	Abdulla Waheedh (Feeali)	Abdulla Waheedh (Feeali), Aminath Ibrahim
3.	"Vakivegen Dhaathee Hithaa Mey Thelheyney" (Male Version)	Easa Shareef	Abdulla Waheedh (Feeali)	Abdulla Waheedh (Feeali)
4.	"Loabin Kalaa Nulibeynenyaa"	Easa Shareef	Abdulla Waheedh (Feeali)	Abdulla Waheedh (Feeali), Aminath Ibrahim
5.	"Vakivegen Dhaathee Hithaa Mey Thelheyney" (Female Version)	Easa Shareef	Abdulla Waheedh (Feeali)	Aminath Ibrahim
