= Alathu Loabi =

- Directed by: Easa Shareef
- Screenplay by: Easa Shareef
- Produced by: Aslam Rasheed
- Starring: Mohamed Shakeeb; Easa Shareef; Nadhiya Zahir; Niuma Abdul Raheem
- Cinematography: Hassan Latheef; Easa Shareef
- Edited by: Ahmed Amir
- Release date: 1994
- Country: Maldives
- Language: Dhivehi

Alathu Loabi is a 1994 Maldivian film written and directed by Easa Shareef. Produced by Aslam Rasheed, the film stars Mohamed Shakeeb, Easa Shareef, Nadhiya Zahir and Niuma Abdul Raheem in pivotal roles.

== Premise ==
Niuma (Niuma Abdul Raheem) a smart playgirl is instantly attracted to a photographer and artist, Shakeeb (Mohamed Shakeeb), who outright rejects her, which costs him the relationship between his brother and an unnecessary enmity with a wealthy and powerful businessman, Shiham, the brother of Niuma. Shakeeb moves to Th. Hirilandhoo, where he meets Greysha, an underprivileged woman who relocates to the same island evading her short-tempered landlord. Shakeeb falls in love with Greysha, who is also caught by the attention of her current landlord, Shareef (Easa Shareef), a well-mannered architect. Meanwhile, Niuma makes every attempt to trace Shakeeb to avenge him for tarnishing her reputation.

== Cast ==
- Mohamed Shakeeb as Shakeeb
- Easa Shareef as Shareef
- Nadhiya Zahir as Greysha
- Niuma Abdul Raheem as Niuma
- Hannaan
- Akram as Akram
- Riyaza Shakir as Riyaza
- Hassan Shiham
- Hassan Latheef

== Soundtrack ==
Track listing
No.	Title	Lyrics	Singer(s)	Length
1.	"Nishana, I Love You"	Easa Shareef	Abdulla Waheedh (Feeali), Aminath Hussain
2.	"Hunumaai Majaa"	Easa Shareef	Abdul Satthar
3.	"Ishaaraathu Libenee Dhurudhurun Dhey"	Easa Shareef	Imaadh Ismail, Shafeeqa Abdul Latheef
4.	"Mihiyy Adhu Roolhi Dhaahaa"	Easa Shareef	Abdulla Waheedh (Feeali)
5.	"Hin'gamun Thelhemun Meygaa"	Easa Shareef	Mohamed Haneef, Aminath Hussain

== Release ==
Upon release, the film received mixed to positive reviews from critics where Shareef's work as a director was particularly praised.
