= 2000 Vana Ufan Dhuvas =

- Official film poster
- Directed by: Easa Shareef
- Written by: Easa Shareef
- Screenplay by: Easa Shareef
- Produced by: Ahmed Wafau
- Starring: Reeko Moosa Manik; Jamsheedha Ahmed; Ali Seezan; Mariyam Shakeela
- Cinematography: Ibrahim Moosa
- Music by: Mohamed Ahmed
- Production company: Genius Movies
- Release date: 2000
- Running time: 121 minutes
- Country: Maldives
- Language: Dhivehi

2000 Vana Ufan Dhuvas (Eng: 2000th birthday) is a 2000 Maldivian horror drama film written and directed by Easa Shareef. Produced by Ahmed Wafau under Genius Movies, the film stars Reeko Moosa Manik, Jamsheedha Ahmed, Ali Seezan and Mariyam Shakeela in pivotal roles.

== Synopsis ==
Sudha (Jamsheedha Ahmed), a peculiar woman moves into a live-in relationship with Vishan (Reeko Moosa Manik) who is already married to a light-hearted woman, Shakeela Mariyam Shakeela. Sudha and Vishan continues their affair while Shakeela, who is now pregnant to a child of Vishan, helplessly watches them romance. Meanwhile, Sudha's identical twin, Shiuna is involved in a romantic relationship with Vishan's best friend, Latheef (Ali Seezan). In guilt, Shiuna explains to Latheef that they are in fact not twins but lookalikes, and she is involved in their game because Sudha begged her to act as her twin-sister. Latheef suspects Sudha is a fraud and is secretly working to desperately achieve something for her benefit. The following day, Latheef is drowned in the sea.

== Cast ==
- Reeko Moosa Manik as Vishan
- Jamsheedha Ahmed as Sudha / Shiuna / Reema
- Ali Seezan as Latheef
- Mariyam Shakeela as Shakeela
- Ali Shameel as Mohamed Fulhu
- Fauziyya Hassan as Shareefa
- Mariyam Haleem as Zubeidha
- Maryam Shafaza Shameem (Special appearance)
- Hawwa Dheena (Special appearance)

== Soundtrack ==
Track listing
No.	Title	Lyrics	Singer(s)	Length
1.	"Hinithun Velaashey Malaaey"	Easa Shareef	Imaadh Ismail, Fazeela Amir
2.	"Dhekelaa Hithey Vanee"	Easa Shareef	Ali Rameez, Fathimath Zoona
3.	"Fini Roalhi Beehenee Ey"	Easa Shareef	Abdul Hannan Moosa Didi, Fazeela Amir
4.	"Ey Sudhaa"	Easa Shareef	Ali Rameez
5.	"Balaanumelaa Dhevey Magakun"	Easa Shareef	Abdul Hannan Moosa Didi
