= Hamdhan Farooq =

Maldivian actor

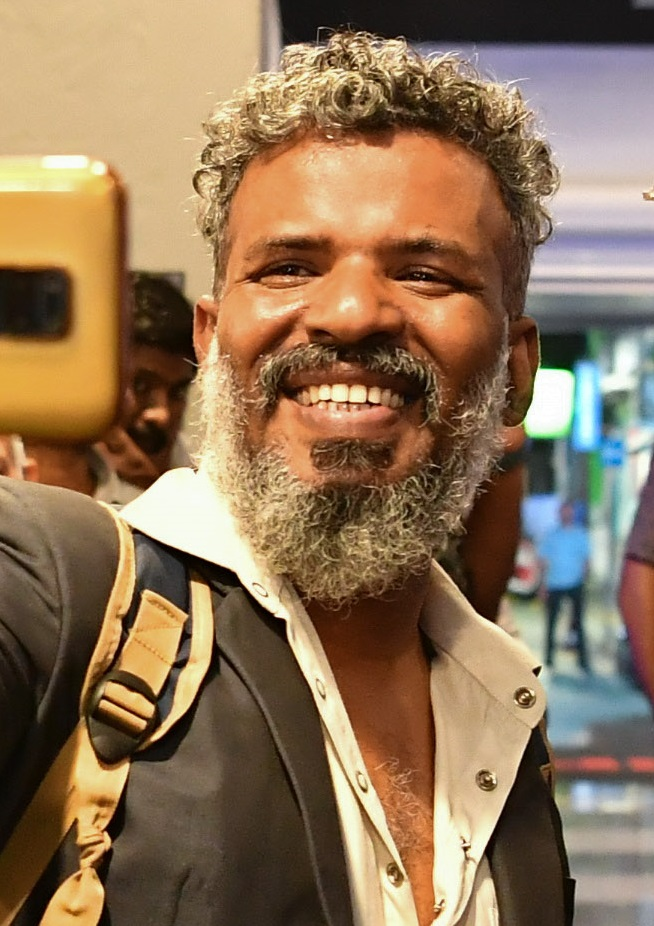
- Hamdhan attending Olympus reopening ceremony, 2023
- Born: 3 June 1983 (age 43); Ga. Dhaandhoo, Maldives
- Occupation: Actor
- Years active: 2004–present
- Spouse: Hamdhoona Saleem (m. 2019)

Hamdhan Farooq (born 3 June 1983) is a Maldivian film actor.

== Early life ==
Farooq was born on 3 June 1983 in Ga. Dhaandhoo. His parents, Ali Farooq and Mariyam Haleem are actors working in the film industry since 1997. He is the brother of actor Ravee Farooq and Hamdhoon Farooq. He credits his parents and brothers to be his inspiration to pursue a career in the film industry.

== Career ==
In 2005, Farooq appeared in Mohamed Abdulla's comedy short films series Dheke Dhekeves in two of its installments, followed by several other productions from Abdulla's "Dheke Dhekeves" studio including Farihibe short film series and his comedy television series Mohamma Gaadiyaa. Ali Seezan's family drama Maafeh Neiy was released in 2010, where he appeared alongside Ali Seezan and Niuma Mohamed, playing the role of a heartless son-in-law. The film highlighting many social issues including human rights abuses, forced marriage and domestic violence was criticized for its melodrama. It was followed by Amjad Ibrahim's romantic horror film Vakinuvinama (2010) alongside Niuma Mohamed and Ravee Farooq, which was a critical and commercial failure.

He then collaborated with Dark Rain Entertainment, for Ali Shifau-directed romantic comedy film Vaashey Mashaa Ekee (2016), where he played the role of a male nurse which was considered the "required comic element" in the film. Afterwards, he continued playing similar role of an effeminate man in several other production ventures of Dark Rain Entertainment including Mee Loaybakee (2017) and Maamui (2019), where he portrayed the role of a hairdresser and stylist in the latter which was positively received by the critics.

== Filmography ==
=== Feature film ===
Year	Title	Role	Notes	Ref(s)
2010	Maafeh Neiy	Mafaaz		
2010	Dhin Veynuge Hithaamaigaa	Himself	Special appearance in the song "Annaashey Hinithun Velamaa"	
2010	Veeraana	School supervisor	Special appearance	
2010	Vakinuvinama	Hussain		
2016	Vaashey Mashaa Ekee	Nurse		
2017	Mee Loaybakee	Shakir Usman		
2019	Maamui	Rozy		
2023	Jokaru	Haris		
2024	Fureytha	Hamdhan		

=== Television ===
Year	Title	Role	Notes	Ref(s)
2004	Kamana Vareh Neiy	Hamdhan	Guest role; "Episode 5"	
2005	Baiveriyaa	Himself	Guest role; "Episode 1"	
2008	Kushakaanulaa Shazaa Nudheyshey			
2009	Mohamma Gaadiyaa	Labeeb	Recurring role; 4 episodes	
2020	Ehenas	Lawyer	Guest role	
2021	Nafsu	Afzal	Recurring role; 10 episodes	
2021	Girlfriends	Shiyam	Guest role; "Episode: Virgin"	
2021–2022	Giritee Loabi	Naaz's boss	Recurring role; 22 episodes	
2022	Vihaali	Rimzee	Main role in the segment "Barber"	
2022	Gudhan	Imran	Guest role; "Episode 12"	
2023	Gareena	Ibrahim	Recurring role	
2025	Roaleemay	Samah	Guest role; Episode: "The Final Blow"	
2025	Feshumaai Nimun	Zaina's client	Guest role; Episode: "Illusions of Love"	
2026	Ganaa †	Rashid		

=== Short film ===
Year	Title	Role	Notes	Ref(s)
2005	Dheke Dhekeves 2	Muhamma's friend		
2006	Dheke Dhekeves 4	Muhamma's friend		
2006	Kudafoolhuge Vasvaas	Himself	Special appearance	
2006	Salhibe	Kokko Foolhu		
2008	Farihibe 2	Kandunoo Qadhir		
2008	Kurafi Dhaadha	Kokko Foolhu		
2009	01 January	Unnamed		
2010	Loabeege Ninja	Mr. Back		
2010	Muhammaage Briefcase	Rasheed's friend		
2011	Farihibe 3	Ishqee Abeeru		
2012	Island Thief	Dholhi Thuhthu		

== Accolades ==
Year	Award	Category	Nominated work	Result	Ref(s)
2025	1st MSPA Film Awards	Best Comedian	Maamui	Nominated	
