= Dheke Dhekeves =

- Produced by: Mohamed Abdulla
- Production companies: Mai Dream Entertainment (Part 1–2); Dheke Dhekeves Productions (Part 3–6)
- Country: Maldives
- Language: Dhivehi

Dheke Dhekeves is a series of Maldivian comedy short films produced by Mohamed Abdulla. The short films are written and directed by different people and follow a linear storytelling though its final installment Dheke Dhekeves 6 has no continuation in the script from its prior installments.

== List of productions ==
Title	Release date	Director(s)	Producer(s)	Writer(s)	Cinematographer(s)	Editor(s)	runtime	Ref(s)
Dheke Dhekeves 1	2004	Yoosuf Shafeeu	Mohamed Abdulla	Mohamed Abdulla	Hassan Haleem	Yoosuf Shafeeu; Ahmed Shah	52 minutes	
Dheke Dhekeves 2	2005	Ravee Farooq	Mohamed Abdulla	Mohamed Abdulla; Ravee Farooq	Hassan Haleem	Yoosuf Shafeeu; Ahmed Asim; Ravee Farooq	68 minutes	
Dheke Dhekeves 3	1 April 2006	Ahmed Nimal	Mohamed Abdulla	Ibrahim Rasheed	Hassan Haleem; Ibrahim Moosa	Ahmed Asim	50 minutes	
Dheke Dhekeves 4	4 December 2006	Ahmed Nimal	Mohamed Abdulla	Ibrahim Rasheed	Hassan Haleem	Abdulla Muaz; Ravee Farooq	54 minutes	
Dheke Dhekeves 5	3 December 2009	Hassan Haleem	Mohamed Abdulla	Ibrahim Rasheed	Hassan Haleem	Muaviyath Anwar	64 minutes	
Dheke Dhekeves 6	6 July 2012	Hassan Haleem	Mohamed Abdulla	Ibrahim Rasheed	Hassan Haleem	Ashwad	73 minutes	

== Plot ==
=== Part 1 ===
Muhamma who is called a madman in the island, confesses his love for Pinky who shows no interest towards him. Pinky's friend, Reena returns to the island and is caught by Muhamma's attention. He buys her several gifts but she refuses to disclose her name even. Muhamma makes several efforts to accomplish his love but Reena mockingly declines, who at the time is planning her marriage with Fareed. Few days later, Reena realizes that Muhamma's feelings are true and accepts him as her love-interest.

=== Part 2 ===
Muhamma rushes to airport to meet his love of life, Reena one last time but instead is smitten with the beauty of another young woman, Suzy, who was waiting at the departure terminal. Muhamma follows Suzy to her island and searches every house for her. There he runs into Pinky and changes his plan from pursuing Suzy's love to marrying Pinky. However, next morning he meets Suzy, and determines to win her heart through extreme measures. Rumors spread that Muhamma had multiple divorces and is a father of many children, which creates misunderstanding between Suzy and Muhamma. Further complication arises, when Pinky and Suzy discover that Muhamma is simultaneously dating both of them. Muhamma successfully convinced the duo of his equal affection and he marries both Pinky and Suzy. Soon after the marriage, it was revealed that Muhamma actually married a spirit (Fauziyya Hassan) in disguise of Pinky.

=== Part 3 ===
The newly wedded couple, Muhamma and Suzy start experiencing paranormal activities. An expert suggests the couple to relocate to another island for a week where he encounters with Ninni, a young woman more attractive to Muhamma than Suzy. Few day later, Suzy discovers about Muhamma's affair and comes to a mutual understanding between the trio; after marriage, Muhamma shall spend first six months with Ninni and the rest of the year with Suzy. Muhamma's second wife, Faudy, a ghost, forewarns him that she will create disputes between his wives and everyone will abandon him. However, few hours later, he again falls for another woman, Sharumeela. As instructed by Faudy, Suzy ditches him and he ultimately gets bored of rest of his affairs.

=== Part 4 ===
After Suzy's unexplained disappearance, Muhamma avoids all the women begging for his love including Ninni and Sharumeela. He hears the news of Suzy's marriage with another man and makes an emotional appearance in the ceremony. Concerned about his "non-affection towards women" condition, Muhamma consults a doctor who gives a medicine as a cure. Soon after, Muhamma builds fondness towards women of every age, minor to elder. A stunning item-girl, Burnerz, the daughter of Faudy becomes the latest addition to Muhamma's list of romance. Faudy inquires from Muhamma about the murder of her husband and he explains it as an accidental death. Muhamma is mentally unstable and roam around the island calling out for his first love, Reena.

=== Part 5 ===
Muhamma wears an amulet which repels women. One day, Muhamma meets Zamra in a forest and she proposes to him which Muhamma politely declines. Due to Zamra's consistent begging, Muhamma agrees to marry her despite his "zero-interest". After the marriage, the couple refrains from intimacy because Muhamma can not develop any emotional attachment. Meanwhile, Pinky returns to the same island on a mission to ruin Muhamma's wedding and win his heart back. Pinky removes his amulet and lures Muhamma into a trap where he shows more affection towards Pinky. Zamra successfully ties the amulet back on Muhamma's hand though the girls continue their fight to win Muhamma.

=== Part 6 ===
Muhamma, an introvert and emotionally immature adult who is "allergic" to women is forced into a relationship with Nashaath by his mother. Nashaath tries to seduce him into sex but Muhamma forcefully evades from her. Concerned of his phobia, Muhamma's mother consult him to an expert, Thakurufaanu whose medication turns him into a romeo. However, things do not go as planned when Muhamma becomes overly affectionate towards Nashaath after marriage. The black magic made by Thakurufaanu loses its power when the couple leaves abroad for honeymoon. Nashaath realizes that devoted version of Muhamma is not real but a curse and leaves him, while Muhamma celebrates being single.

== Cast and characters ==
Cast	Part 1	Part 2	Part 3	Part 4	Part 5	Part 6
Mohamed Abdulla	Muhamma	Muhamma	Muhamma	Muhamma	Muhamma	Muhamma
Fathimath Neelam	Reena					
Ahmed Ziya	Fareed	Fareed				
Nadhiya Hassan	Pinky	Pinky			Pinky	Nashaath
Aminath	Ainth					
Ali Mahir	Adam Naseer	Adam Naseer				Yaube
Dhon Kamana	Reena's mother					
Aminath Rana		Suzy	Suzy	Suzy / Lizy		
Adam Mohamed		Hillath				
Hamdhan Farooq		Muhamma's friend		Muhamma's friend		
Fauziyya Hassan		Fauziyya "Faudy"	Fauziyya "Faudy"	Fauziyya "Faudy"		
Aishath Siyadha			Ninni	Ninni		
Nashidha Mohamed			Sharumeela	Sharumeela		
Ahmed Latheef			Abdul Fatthah			
Hussain Nooradeen			Ghaffar	Ghaffar		
Niuma Mohamed				Burnerz		
Ibrahim Naseer				Gareeb		
Ahmed Nimal				Doctor		
Ravee Farooq				Dancer		
Hamdhoon Farooq				Muhamma's friend	Muhamma's friend	
Amira Ismail					Zamra	
Mohamed Rifshan					Dhonko	
Mariyam Haleem						Muhamma's mother
Ali Farooq						Magistrate
Roanu Hassan Manik						Thakurufaanu

== Soundtrack ==
=== Part 1 ===
No.	Title	Lyrics	Singer(s)	Length
1.	"Fendaa Matheegaa Hurey Kalaa"	Ahmed Nashidh (Dharavandhoo)	Mukhthar Adam
2.	"Lui Lui Madu Madu Foni Foni Raha Eh"		Fathimath Zoona
3.	"Emme Rangalhu"		Hussain Sobah
4.	"Kalaa Miadhu Thihiree Mashaa Nuhurifaa"	Ahmed Nashidh (Dharavandhoo)
5.	"Dhon Kamanaa Aharennaa Indhefaanan Hey?"	Ahmed Nashidh (Dharavandhoo)	Hussain Sobah, Shaheedha Mohamed

=== Part 2 ===
No.	Title	Lyrics	Singer(s)	Length
1.	"Loabivey Haadha Suzee Ey"	Adam Naseer Ibrahim		3:24
2.	"Engeyhey Ran Loabeegaa"	Adam Naseer Ibrahim	Moonisa Khaleel, Hassan Ilham	3:49
3.	"E Magey Hithuge Zuvaan"	Adam Naseer Ibrahim	Mumthaz Moosa	4:57
4.	"Nidhaalumun Heeviyey"	Ahmed Nashidh (Dharavandhoo)	Ali Rameez	3:26
5.	"Kadaboh Kadaboh"	Adam Naseer Ibrahim	Hussain Sobah	4:27

=== Part 3 ===
No.	Title	Lyrics	Music	Singer(s)	Length
1.	"Dhoalhuvee Loabin"	Mohamed Rasheed	Hussain Sobah	Mumthaz Moosa, Aishath Inaya	4:31
2.	"Beehumun Ufaaveyhey"	Ahmed Nashidh (Dharavandhoo)	Imad Ismail	Fathimath Zoona	6:02
3.	"Hithu There Dhekkeemey Falhaa"	Mohamed Rasheed	Hardy	Imad, Nashidha	4:31
4.	"Magey Jaan Hibaen Dhemey"	Mohamed Rasheed	Ibrahim Zaid Ali	Ibrahim Zaid Ali	3:38
5.	"Ran Keema"	Mohamed Rasheed	Muaviyath Anwar	Mukhthar Adam	4:21

=== Part 4 ===
No.	Title	Lyrics	Music	Singer(s)	Length
1.	"Loa Tholhey"	Hassan Rasheed	Imad Ismail	Shafeeqa Abdul Latheef, Mumthaz Moosa	5:03
2.	"Bigaraa Ey"	Adam Naseer Ibrahim	Hussain Sobah	Hussain Ali, Fathimath Zoona	7:54
3.	"Farubadha Kandaashe"	Mohamed Rasheed	Hussain Sobah	Hussain Ali, Hussain Sobah	4:21
4.	"Hiyy Thelhey Varu"	Mohamed Rasheed	Hussain Sobah	Hussain Sobah	4:15
5.	"Jismaai Mey"	Adam Haleem Adnan	Hussain Sobah	Mumthaz Moosa, Moonisa Khaleel	5:52

=== Part 5 ===
No.	Title	Lyrics	Music	Singer(s)	Length
1.	"Laki Laki"	Mohamed Abdul Ghanee	Hussain Sobah	Hassan Ilham, Aminath Shaufa Saeed
2.	"Shaadhee Veema"	Mohamed Abdul Ghanee	Ibrahim Zaid Ali	Abdulla Nashif
3.	"Ranaa Fulhu"	Mohamed Abdul Ghanee	Ibrahim Zaid Ali	Mumthaz Moosa
4.	"Dheynan Jaan"	Adam Haleem Adnan	Nasir Ibrahim (Maliku)	Nasir Ibrahim (Maliku)
5.	"Mihitheh Dheykah"	Adam Haleem Adnan	Ibrahim Zaid Ali	Mohamed Abdul Ghanee

=== Part 6 ===
No.	Title	Lyrics	Music	Singer(s)	Length
1.	"Hiyy Thelheyhey"	Ibrahim Rasheed	Hussain Sobah	Hussain Sobah, Rafiyath Rameeza	04:43
2.	"Unda Kakkaigen Viyas"	Adam Haleem Adnan	Hussain Sobah	Abdulla Nashif, Samaha Moosa	04:12
3.	"Kulliyakah Hama Loabi Vevijjey"	Adam Haleem Adnan	Hussain Sobah	Abdulla Nashif	03:20
4.	"Alhe Kevvegen Hey Bunebalaa"	Adam Haleem Adnan	Hussain Sobah	Aaddey, Shaheedha Riffath	03:34
