= Hiyy Vanee Inthizaarugai =

Maldivian television series

- Genre: Drama
- Written by: Mariyam Moosa
- Directed by: Mohamed Manik
- Music by: Ibrahim Zaid Ali

Production
- Producer: Mohamed Abdulla
- Cinematography: Ibrahim Moosa
- Production company: Dhekedheke Ves Productions

Original release
- Release: 2011

Hiyy Vanee Inthizaarugai is a Maldivian television series developed for Television Maldives by Mohamed Manik. Produced by Mohamed Abdulla under Movie Dhekedheke Ves Productions, the series stars Mohamed Manik, Sheela Najeeb and Zeenath Abbas in pivotal roles. The entire film was shot in Aa. Rasmaadhoo.

== Cast ==
=== Main ===
- Mohamed Manik as Shafiu
- Sheela Najeeb as Suha
- Zeenath Abbas as Zara

=== Recurring ===
- Koyya Hassan Manik as Moosa
- Mariyam Haleem as Naseema
- Naashidha Mohamed as Jazlee
- Rifa as Wadheefa
- Abdulla as Arushid

== Episodes ==
| No. in season | Title | Directed by |
|---|---|---|
| 1,2 | "Episode 1 and 2" | Mohamed Manik |
Suha (Sheela Najeeb) and Zara (Zeenath Abbas) are two siblings who are miles apart in personality and lifestyle choices, where the former is an acquiescent introvert while the latter is more sociable and outgoing. Zara is pampered by her mother, Naseema (Mariyam Haleem), where their father, Moosa (Koyya Hassan Manik) blames Naseema for sidelining Suha in the family and for unequal treatment between the sisters. Zara falls in love with a wealthy young man, Shafiu (Mohamed Manik) while he is romantically attracted to Suha. Moosa agrees to their marriage on one condition; conceal a family secret from Suha.
| 3,4 | "Episode 3 and 4" | Mohamed Manik |
Though initially reluctant, Suha agrees to marry Shafiu one she realizes that her crush Arushad does not have mutual feelings towards each other. Shafiu's ex-girlfriend, Jazlee (Naashidha Mohamed) determines to avenge on Shafiu and reveal their past relationship to Suha.
| 5,6 | "Episode 5 and 6" | Mohamed Manik |
Suha gets pregnant and Zara visits her for two months. Meanwhile, Zara blackmails Shafiu to act according to her demands unless he wants Suha to find out about their family secret.

== Soundtrack ==
Track listing
| No. | Title | Singer(s) | Length |
|---|---|---|---|
| 1. | "Hiyy Vanee Inthizaarugai" | Ibrahim Zaid Ali |
