= Mhendhan =

Maldivian TV series

- Genre: Romantic drama
- Written by: Moomin Fuad
- Directed by: Hussain Nooradeen
- Starring: Aminath Nisha Rasheed; Ajnaaz Ali; Mariyam Shakeela; Ahmed Asim; Aishath Eshal Asim; Hussain Nooradeen

Production
- Producer: Baiskoafu
- Editor: Ahmed Asim
- Running time: 18 minutes

Original release
- Network: Baiskoafu
- Release: June 4 – July 2, 2019

Mhendhan is a Maldivian romantic drama web television series developed for Baiskoafu by Hussain Nooradeen. The series stars Aminath Nisha Rasheed, Ajnaaz Ali, Mariyam Shakeela, Ahmed Asim, Aishath Eshal Asim and Hussain Nooradeen in pivotal roles. The first episode of the series was released on Baiskoafu on 4 June 2019 on the occasion of Eid al-Fitr. It revolves around a young woman who relocates to her husband's house and is isolated from the society. Filming for the series took place in F. Nilandhoo.

== Premise ==
A young couple Sofoora (Aminath Nisha Rasheed) and Aslam (Ajnaaz Ali), who are married for two years, relocate to the husband's island with their daughter, and struggle to mingle with the society when everyone from his family to friends had already abandoned him. Aslam moves back to Male' for a week in search of a job. Left alone, Sofoora suffers in the unfriendly environment.

== Cast ==
- Aminath Nisha Rasheed as Sofoora
- Ajnaaz Ali as Aslam
- Mariyam Shakeela as Sakeena
- Ahmed Asim as Habeeb
- Aishath Eshal Asim
- Hussain Nooradeen as Usman
- Samsunnisa Ibrahim
- Ahmed Shareef as Zameer
- Wajeeha Nasir as Usman's wife

== Soundtrack ==
Track listing
No.	Title	Length
1.	"Ekaniverikan Vanee"

== Release ==
The first episode among the five episodes was released on 4 June 2019 on the occasion of 1440 Eid al-Fitr. A new episode is scheduled to release on Tuesday at 21:00 of every week. The last episode of the series was released on 2 July 2019.
