= Farihibe 4 =

- Official film poster
- Directed by: Abdulla Muaz
- Written by: Ahmed Falah
- Screenplay by: Ahmed Falah
- Produced by: Mohamed Abdulla
- Starring: Mohamed Abdulla; Ismail Rasheed; Fathimath Azifa; Aishath Rishmy
- Cinematography: Ibrahim Wisan
- Edited by: Abdulla Muaz
- Music by: Muaviyath Anwar
- Production company: Dhekedheke Ves Production
- Release date: 2013
- Country: Maldives
- Language: Dhivehi

Farihibe 4 is a 2013 Maldivian period drama short-film directed by Abdulla Muaz. Produced by Mohamed Abdulla under Dhekedheke Ves Production, the film stars Mohamed Abdulla, Ismail Rasheed, Fathimath Azifa and Aishath Rishmy in pivotal roles. All the dialogues of the film were conveyed in the form of farihi, a traditional satirical format of a poem.

== Premise ==
Farihibe (Mohamed Abdulla) is romantically attracted to a young pretty woman, Abidha (Fathimath Azifa) while her vile step-mother (Mariyam Haleem) arranges her marriage with wealthy businessman Ajumal (Ismail Rasheed) who is rumored to be having an affair with Suraiyya (Aishath Rishmy). Farihibe brings up his marriage proposal to Abidha's father who outright rejects him considering his impoverished nature.

== Cast ==
- Mohamed Abdulla as Farihibe
- Ismail Rasheed as Ajumal
- Fathimath Azifa as Abidha
- Aishath Rishmy as Suraiyya
- Mariyam Haleem as Abidha's step-mother

== Soundtrack ==
Track listing
No.	Title	Lyrics	Music	Singer(s)	Length
1.	"Fariyah Folhey Reethi"	Ahmed Falah	Muaviyath Anwar	Abdulla Nashif	3:35
2.	"Riyaleh Nagan"	Ahmed Falah	Muaviyath Anwar	Mohamed Abdul Ghanee	4:20
3.	"Dhun Elhi Fariyaa"	Ahmed Falah	Ibrahim Zaid Ali	Ibrahim Zaid Ali	4:43
4.	"Mahroom Vee Alhugandu"	Ahmed Falah	Muaviyath Anwar	Mumthaz Moosa	3:44
5.	"Ishqee Mihithugaa"	Ahmed Falah	Muaviyath Anwar	Ahmed Falah	3:44

== Accolades ==
Award	Category	Recipients	Result	Ref.
3rd Maldives Film Awards	Best Film - Short Film	Farihibe 4	Won	
3rd Maldives Film Awards	Best Director - Short Film	Abdulla Muaz	Won	
3rd Maldives Film Awards	Best Actor - Short Film	Mohamed Abdulla	Won	
3rd Maldives Film Awards	Best Actress - Short Film	Fathimath Azifa	Won	
3rd Maldives Film Awards	Best Supporting Actor - Short Film	Ismail Rasheed	Won	
3rd Maldives Film Awards	Best Supporting Actress - Short Film	Aishath Rishmy	Won	
3rd Maldives Film Awards	Best Editing	Abdulla Muaz	Nominated	
3rd Maldives Film Awards	Best Screenplay - Short Film	Ahmed Falah	Won	
3rd Maldives Film Awards	Best Cinematography - Short Film	Ibrahim Wisan	Won	
3rd Maldives Film Awards	Best Makeup Artist - Short Film	Aishath Rishmy, Fathimath Azifa	Won	
8th Gaumee Film Awards	Best Short Film	Farihibe 4	Nominated	
8th Gaumee Film Awards	Best Director - Short Film	Abdulla Muaz	Nominated	
8th Gaumee Film Awards	Best Actor - Short Film	Mohamed Abdulla	Nominated	
8th Gaumee Film Awards	Best Actress - Short Film	Fathimath Azifa	Won	
8th Gaumee Film Awards	Best Supporting Actor - Short Film	Ismail Rasheed	Nominated	
8th Gaumee Film Awards	Best Supporting Actress - Short Film	Aishath Rishmy	Nominated	
