= Ethoofaaneerey =

- Directed by: Ali Musthafa
- Written by: Fathimath Nahula
- Produced by: Hassan Ali
- Starring: Aishath Shiranee; Hussain Sobah
- Cinematography: Mohamed Nasheed
- Music by: Imad Ismail; Hussain Sobah
- Production company: Dash Studio
- Release date: 1998
- Running time: 182 minutes
- Country: Maldives
- Language: Dhivehi

Ethoofaaneerey is a 1998 Maldivian film directed by Ali Musthafa. Produced by Hassan Ali under Dash Studio, the film stars Aishath Shiranee and Hussain Sobah in pivotal roles.

== Premise ==
A woman dies while giving birth to a twins. In a helpless condition, their uncle (Chilhiya Moosa Manik) handover one of the twins to an infertile parent (Aminath Rasheedha and Ibrahim) living in Male'.

Several years later, Ifasha (Aishath Shiranee), an unattractive nerd, abandoned by her mother (Mariyam Haleem), joins a class to complete her studies where she is harassed and bullied for looking ordinary. Nifasha lashes out at her classmate, Fayaz (Hussain Sobah) when he approaches her in public, with whom she later bonds once he apologizes for being rude to her. A romantic relationship grows between them which resulted in them getting married and living their happiest lives with their daughter, Shuha (Mariyam Sheleen), until Fayaz's unfortunate demise in a fire accident. In a state of shock, she loses her voice and becomes mute.

Shuha sees Fayaz's twin brother, Latheef (Hussain Sobah) in a park and brings him home treating him as her father. Latheef tries every possible way to compensate for the loss of Shuha, though Nifasha's affection for Fayaz remains irreplaceable. Latheef narrates his past to Nifasha; an unhappy marriage with Aishath (Aishath Jaleel) gets influenced by the latter's vile mother (Arifa Ibrahim) who spoils their only child, Fizee (Aishath Fizee), a classmate of Shuha.

== Cast ==
- Aishath Shiranee as Ifasha
- Hussain Sobah as Fayaz / Latheef
- Aishath Jaleel as Aishath
- Arifa Ibrahim as Aishath's mother
- Aminath Sheleen as Aishath Shuha
- Aishath Fizee as Aishath Fizee
- Aminath Rasheedha as Haseena; Fayaz's adoptive mother
- Ibrahim as Fayaz's adoptive father
- Chilhiya Moosa Manik as Fayaz's uncle
- Mariyam Haleem as Nifasha's mother
- Shahzadh
- Ravee Farooq as Habeeb; Fayaz's friend
- Abidha
- Mohamed Nasheed
- Athifa Abdulla
- Mariyam Rizla as a school teacher
- Sithi Fulhu as Faathuma; house maid
- Ibrahimbe
- Azra
- Shiyam
- Mariyam Shazna (Special appearance in the song "Gaathuga Geydhoshun")

== Soundtrack ==
Track listing
No.	Title	Lyrics	Singer(s)	Length
1.	"Gasthuga Geydhoshun"	Ahmed Sharumeel	Abdul Hannan Moosa Didi
2.	"Nifasha I Love You"	Ahmed Haleem	Ali Rameez, Shifa Thaufeeq
3.	"Bappa Loabi Bappa"	Mausoom Shakir	Imaadh Ismail, Unoosha
4.	"Eyru Dhinhaa Ufaa"	Ahmed Shakeeb	Abdul Hannan Moosa Didi, Rafiyath Rameeza
5.	"Thi Lolun Saafuvee"	Easa Shareef	Abdul Hannan Moosa Didi, Shifa Thaufeeq

== Reception ==
Upon release, the film received mainly positive reviews from critics and audience. Reviewing from Mihaaru, Ahmed Adhushan included the film in the list of Shiranee's five best performances in her career and applauded the work by Ali Musthafa in his debut direction and acknowledges the chemistry between the lead actors.

== Accolades ==
Year	Award	Category	Recipients	Result	Ref(s)
1998	Aafathis Awards - 1998	Best Actress	Aishath Shiranee	Nominated	
1998	Aafathis Awards - 1998	Best Actor	Hussain Sobah	Won	
