= 13 Ah Visnaa Dhehaas =

- Official film poster
- Directed by: Abdulla Muaz
- Screenplay by: Ahmed Falah
- Starring: Mohamed Abdulla; Niuma Mohamed; Ismail Rasheed; Fathimath Azifa
- Cinematography: Shivaz Abdulla
- Edited by: Abdulla Muaz
- Music by: Ibrahim Zaid Ali
- Production company: Dhekedheke Ves Productions
- Release date: 2012
- Country: Maldives
- Language: Dhivehi

13 Ah Visnaa Dhehaas is a 2012 Maldivian political comedy short film directed by Abdulla Muaz. Produced by Mohamed Abdulla under Dhekedheke Ves Productions, the film stars Abdulla, Niuma Mohamed, Ismail Rasheed and Fathimath Azifa in pivotal roles. The entire film was shot in R. Ungoofaaru. At the 3rd Maldives Film Awards ceremony, the film was nominated in eight categories.

== Premise ==
The film revolves around the conflict of two political parties, Maldives Democratic Party (MDP) and Progressive Party of Maldives (PPM) where two couples representing each party involves in political and personal complications in regards to the 2013 Presidency of Maldives. The film also incorporates several actual footage from the campaign events held by MDP. The film ends with PPM activist, Hussein Fulhu (Mohamed Abdulla) and MDP activist, Ismail Fulhu (Ismail Rasheed) unintentionally divorcing their respective wives, Zuleykha (Fathimath Azifa) and Mariyam Zeeniya (Niuma Mohamed).

== Cast ==
- Mohamed Abdulla as Hussein Fulhu
- Niuma Mohamed as Mariyam Zeeniya
- Ismail Rasheed as Ismail Fulhu
- Fathimath Azifa as Zuleykha
- Ali Waheed as President Mohamed Nasheed

== Soundtrack ==
Track listing
No.	Title	Lyrics	Music	Singer(s)	Length
1.	"13 Ah Visnaa Dhehaas"	Ahmed Falah	Ibrahim Zaid Ali	Mohamed Abdul Ghanee, Ibrahim Zaid Ali

== Accolades ==
Award	Category	Recipients	Result	Ref.
3rd Maldives Film Awards	Best Film (Short Film)	13 Ah Visnaa Dhehaas	Nominated	
3rd Maldives Film Awards	Best Director (Short Film)	Abdulla Muaz	Nominated	
3rd Maldives Film Awards	Best Actor (Short Film)	Mohamed Abdulla	Nominated	
3rd Maldives Film Awards	Best Actress (Short Film)	Niuma Mohamed	Nominated	
3rd Maldives Film Awards	Best Supporting Actor (Short Film)	Ismail Rasheed	Nominated	
3rd Maldives Film Awards	Best Supporting Actress (Short Film)	Fathimath Azifa	Nominated	
3rd Maldives Film Awards	Best Screenplay (Short Film)	Ahmed Falah	Nominated	
3rd Maldives Film Awards	Best Cinematography (Short Film)	Shivaz Abdulla	Nominated	
8th Gaumee Film Awards	Best Actress - Short Film	Niuma Mohamed	Nominated	
8th Gaumee Film Awards	Best Supporting Actress - Short Film	Fathimath Azifa	Won	
8th Gaumee Film Awards	Best Cinematography - Short Film	Shivaz Abdulla	Nominated	
