= Falhi Sikunthu =

Maldivian comedy short film series

- Official film poster
- Produced by: Mohamed Abdulla
- Production company: Mai Dream Entertainments
- Country: Maldives
- Language: Dhivehi

Falhi Sikunthu is a two-part Maldivian comedy short film series produced by Mohamed Abdulla under Mai Dream Entertainments. The first installment of the series, written by Abdullah and directed by Amjad Ibrahim was released in 2004. The second installment, a standalone short film from its prequel, written by Ibrahim Rasheed and directed by Ravee Farooq was released in 2005.

== List of productions ==
Title	Release date	Director(s)	Producer(s)	Writer(s)	Cinematographer(s)	Editor(s)	runtime	Ref(s)
Falhi Sikunthu 1	2004	Amjad Ibrahim	Mohamed Abdulla	Mohamed Abdulla	—N/a	—N/a	48 minutes	
Falhi Sikunthu 2	6 December 2005	Ravee Farooq	Mohamed Abdulla	Ibrahim Rasheed	Ibrahim Moosa	Ahmed Shah	61 minutes	

== Premise ==
=== Falhi Sikunthu 1 ===
Muhamma (Mohamed Abdulla), an old-fashioned, short-tempered man, visits Male' and problems follow with him from bumping on random people walking by. On his way to his friend's home, he spots a gorgeous poster woman, Mariyam (Sheereen Abdul Wahid) where he falls in love with at first sight. His friend, Habeeb (Hussain Nooradeen) advises him to undergo a full makeover and wear modern attire, if he insists to win her heart. He goes from door-to-door asking for her whereabouts where he meets her father, who warns him to stay away from his daughter. Soon, he becomes shortly distracted after seeing another woman (Waleedha). This does not stop Muhamma from his hunt for Mariyam though Habeeb recommends him to go back to his island and return after performing black magic to win her love.

=== Falhi Sikunthu 2 ===
Fathuhiyya, who got pregnant forty years later goes into an unusual labor during her eleventh month of pregnancy. The newborn child grows up to an adult, Muhamma (Mohamed Abdulla), within a fraction of few seconds, who seems to be possessed by Michael Jackson. A song later it is revealed that Muhamma has a body of an adult but a mind of five years' child. However, when it comes to women, Muhamma has a very mature mind and is incontrollable with his feelings and desires.

== Cast ==
Falhi Sikunthu 1

- Mohamed Abdulla as Muhamma
- Sheereen Abdul Wahid as Mariyam
- Ahmed Shaz as Aadhanu; a chef / a physics teacher
- Hussain Nooradeen as Habeeb
- Nazim
- Sameema
- Hussain Shibau
- Nafiu Saleem
- Nadhiya Hassan (special appearance in the song "Meheboob Magey")
- Ahmed Ziya (special appearance in the song "Meheboob Magey")
- Waleedha (special appearance in the song "Manjey Bunedhee")

Falhi Sikunthu 2

- Mohamed Abdulla as Muhamma
- Zeenath Abbas as Athika
- Ibrahim Naseer as Siraj
- Aishath Siyadha as Rizna aunty
- Mariyam Haleem as Athika's mother
- Ahmed Nimal as Ziyazor
- Ahmed Shah as doctor
- Niuma Mohamed as a nurse
- Ali Farooq as Athika's father
- Ravee Farooq (special appearance in the song "Sissaali Dhanvaru")
- Mumthaz Moosa (special appearance in the song "Inthizaaruge Guitar")

== Soundtrack ==
Falhi Sikunthu 1
No.	Title	Lyrics	Singer(s)	Length
1.	"Meheboob Magey"		Mukhthar Adam, Fazeela Amir	5:13
2.	"Muniyaa Magey Fari Aadhey"			6:16
3.	"Baraveli Kanduge Adeega"	Ahmed Nashidh (Dharavandhoo)	Mohamed Musthafa Ali	4:09
4.	"Manjey Bunedhee"		Mohamed Musthafa Ali	4:11
5.	"Ey Handhaanun Filaigen Nudhaathee"		Mohamed Musthafa Ali	4:32

Falhi Sikunthu 2
No.	Title	Lyrics	Singer(s)	Length
1.	"Sissaali Dhanvaru"		Aminath Nashidha, Mohamed Abdul Ghanee	7:08
2.	"Hooreh Fadha Zuvaana"	Ahmed Nashidh (Dharavandhoo)	Mukhthar Adam	3:14
3.	"Hithuge Maina Nudhahchey"	Adam Naseer Ibrahim	Sofoora Khaleel, Hussain Sobah	3:57
4.	"Inthizaaruge Guitar"	Adam Naseer Ibrahim	Mumthaz Moosa	4:03
5.	"Jahanvaane Athaa"	Adam Naseer Ibrahim	Mohamed Farhad	4:42

== Accolades ==
Year	Award	Category	Nominated work	Result	Ref(s)
2007	4th Gaumee Film Awards	Best Film — Short film	Falhi Sikunthu 2	Won	
2007	4th Gaumee Film Awards	Best Director — Short film	Ravee Farooq — Falhi Sikunthu 2	Won	
2007	4th Gaumee Film Awards	Best Actor — Short film	Ahmed Shaz — Falhi Sikunthu 1	Won	
