= Ibrahim Zaid Ali =

Maldivian singer, music composer (born 1978)

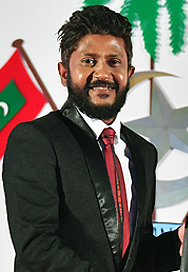
- Ali receiving the National Award of Recognition, 2017
- Born: 15 January 1978 (age 48); GDh. Thinadhoo, Maldives
- Occupations: Playback singer; Music composer
- Years active: 2001–present
- Musical career
- Genres: Pop; filmi; electronic
- Instrument: Vocals

Ibrahim Zaid Ali (born 15 April 1978), commonly known as Kuda Ibbe is a Maldivian singer and music composer.

== Early life and career ==
Since childhood, Ali had been listening to all genres of songs from Bollywood classical to hip-hop to heavy metal music. At the age of seven, Ali fabricated music equipment including guitar and drum using wood, plywood and tin, where he used these self-made instruments to perform songs in the football stadium. His talent was recognized by a band member who visited his island for a show where this member gifted him with a real guitar. In 1997, during his vacation, Ali visited Male' where one of his family members, Ahmed Nihan, a music performer back then, introduced him to the world of The Beatles, Creedence Clearwater Revival, Iron Maiden, Metallica and Guns N' Roses. Before pursuing a career in music, Ali worked as a professional painter and artist developing banners and posters.

His first public stage performance was as a guitarist in the Hafthaa Show where prominent faces including Ali Rameez and Mezzo Mohamed Majid were star performers. In of the shows, he performed a Bollywood track of Sonu Nigam which caught the eyes of several music artists. During the time, Dhivehi Raajjeyge Adu was in the process of forming a music band titled "Waves Band". The band was formed in 2001 which also marks his career beginning by performing three tracks for the album Aimina. The following year he performed his breakthrough song "Edhemey Kalaayah" from the album Hithukooru which topped charts for many weeks. Initially, scheduled to record the song in the voice of Mohamed Abdul Ghanee, it was later landed to Ali which he considered as his "biggest fortune" in his career.

Afterwards, Ali became one of the most sought after artists and was hired by several music directors and producers to perform songs and compose music for many studio albums, films, national songs and religious tracks. Initially, he was labelled as a composer "rehashing copy tunes" though later he was credited as one of the "prominent original music composers" of the nation where in 2018, the Government of Maldives honoured him with the National Award of Recognition, which he attributed as his biggest achievement.

== Discography ==
=== Feature film ===
Year	Film	Song	Lyricist(s)	Co-artist(s)	Notes
2005	Zuleykha	"Thi Loaiybah Hiyy Kiyaaleemaa"	Mausoom Shakir	Aishath Inaya	
2008	Yoosuf	"Beevedhaanebaa"	Mausoom Shakir	Ahmed Lais Asim, Sofoora Khaleel	
2009	Hiyy Rohvaanulaa	"Haaufaa Dheynamey"	Mohamed Abdul Ghanee	Mumthaz Moosa, Mariyam Ashfa	
2009	Hiyy Rohvaanulaa	"Ufaavey Kalaa Fenumun"	Ahmed Falah	Mariyam Ashfa	
2009	Hiyy Rohvaanulaa	"Faqeeru Koe"	Ahmed Falah	Solo	Appears in Soundtrack album
2009	Hiyy Rohvaanulaa	"Vaudhey Vevey Mee"	Kopee Ibrahim Rasheed	Mariyam Ashfa	Appears in Soundtrack album
2009	Hiyy Rohvaanulaa	"Haaufaa Dheynamey" (Remix Version)	Mohamed Abdul Ghanee	Mumthaz Moosa, Mariyam Ashfa	Appears in Soundtrack album
2009	Karuna Vee Beyvafa	"Karunavee Beyvafaa" (Remix Version)	Mohamed Abdul Ghanee	Mohamed Abdul Ghanee	Appears in Soundtrack album
2009	E Dharifulhu	"Hiyy Mi Edhey"	Mohamed Abdul Ghanee	Mariyam Ashfa	
2009	Loaiybahtakaa	"Loaiybahtakaa"	Adam Haleem Adnan	Aishath Maain Rasheed	
2010	Maafeh Neiy	"Antharees Hiyy Veyey"	Mohamed Abdul Ghanee	Maya Nasih	
2010	Maafeh Neiy	"Thihen Ladhun Heeleemaa"	Mohamed Abdul Ghanee	Solo	
2010	Maafeh Neiy	"Hanhaarain Hiyy Furidhey"	Mohamed Abdul Ghanee	Rafiyath Rameeza	
2010	Dhin Veynuge Hithaamaigaa	"Annaashey Hinithunvelamaa"	Mohamed Abdul Ghanee	Various Artists	
2010	Dhin Veynuge Hithaamaigaa	"Dhoadhi Ran" (Version 2)	Mohamed Abdul Ghanee	Rafiyath Rameeza	Appears in Soundtrack album
2010	Dhin Veynuge Hithaamaigaa	"Dhin Veynuge Hithaamaigaa" (Theme Version)	Abdul Hannan Moosa Didi	Solo	Appears in Soundtrack album
2010	Veeraana	"Hoorehhe Thiyaee"	Adam Haleem Adnan	Solo	
2010	Veeraana	"Veeraanaa Vefaavaa Hayaaiy"	Adam Haleem Adnan	Rafiyath Rameeza	
2010	Veeraana	"Mausoomu Hiyy"	Adam Haleem Adnan	Moonisa Khaleel	
2010	Veeraana	"Veeraanaa" (Promotional Song)	Adam Haleem Adnan	Various Artists	Appears in Soundtrack album
2010	Veeraana	"Vakivedhiyayas" (Bonus Song)	Adam Haleem Adnan	Mariyam Unoosha	Appears in Soundtrack album
2010	Veeraana	"Ivvenee Haaley" (Bonus Song)	Mausoom Shakir	Solo	Appears in Soundtrack album
2010	Veeraana	"Beevedhaanebaa" (Bonus Song)	Mausoom Shakir	Solo	Appears in Soundtrack album
2010	Fanaa	"Thiya Jismuge Hoonun"	Ahmed Nashid (Dharavandhoo)	Mariyam Ashfa	
2010	Niuma	"Hiyy Dhevijjey Kalaayah"	Adam Haleem Adnan	Aishath Maain Rasheed	
2010	Niuma	"Vindhaa Kulhey Kulhey"	Mohamed Abdul Ghanee	Various Artists	
2010	Niuma	"Niumaa" (Promotional Song)	Mohamed Abdul Ghanee	Various Artists	Appears in Soundtrack album
2010	Niuma	"Fathihaa Fenilaa Nala Goma" (Bonus Song)	Mohamed Abdul Ghanee	Solo	Appears in Soundtrack album
2010	Vakinuvinama	"Thiya Loabeegaa"	Mohamed Abdul Ghanee	Mariyam Ashfa	
2010	Heyonuvaane	"Konkahala Lolhumeh"	Adam Haleem Adnan	Solo	Nominated— Gaumee Film Award for Best Male Playback Singer
2011	Sazaa	"Furathama Nazarun"	Mohamed Abdul Ghanee	Solo	
2011	Sazaa	"Kuruvi Dhigu Inthizaaru"	Mohamed Abdul Ghanee	Mariyam Ashfa	
2011	Zaharu	"Dhuniyeynvee Baakee" (Duet Version)	Mohamed Abdul Ghanee	Rafiyath Rameeza	
2011	Zaharu	"Araamu Dheyshey"	Mohamed Abdul Ghanee	Rafiyath Rameeza	
2011	Zaharu	"Zaharu"	Mohamed Abdul Ghanee	Solo	Appears in Soundtrack album
2011	Zaharu	"Zaharu" (Remix Version)	Mohamed Abdul Ghanee	Solo	Appears in Soundtrack album
2011	Zaharu	"Dhuniyeynvee Baakee" (Male Version)	Mohamed Abdul Ghanee	Solo	Appears in Soundtrack album
2011	14 Vileyrey	"Saadhavileyrey" (Promotional Song)	Mohamed Abdul Ghanee	Solo	Appears in Soundtrack album
2011	Wathan	"Balaaleemaa Loabin"	Mohamed Abdul Ghanee	Mariyam Unoosha	
2011	Wathan	"Fari Paree Fenilumun" (Bonus Song)	Mohamed Abdul Ghanee	Solo	Appears in Soundtrack album
2011	Laelaa	"Mihiree Kalaayahtakaa"		Shaheedha Mohamed	
2011	Laelaa	"Mifuraana Ekugaa"		Shaheedha Mohamed	
2011	Hiyy Yaara Dheefa	"Dheyshey Naa" (Version 2)	Mohamed Abdul Ghanee	Aminath Lamha Latheef	Nominated— Gaumee Film Award for Best Male Playback Singer
2011	Hiyy Yaara Dheefa	"Vindhaa Furaanain" (Promotional Song)	Mohamed Abdul Ghanee	Mariyam Ashfa, Mohamed Abdul Ghanee	Appears in Soundtrack album
2011	Hiyy Yaara Dheefa	"Dheyshey Naa" (Version 1)	Mohamed Abdul Ghanee	Mariyam Rifqa	Appears in Soundtrack album
2011	Hiyy Yaara Dheefa	"Fini Rey Moosun" (Bonus Song)		Mariyam Rifqa	Appears in Soundtrack album
2012	Mihashin Furaana Dhandhen	"Furathama Nazarun"	Mohamed Abdul Ghanee	Solo	
2012	Mihashin Furaana Dhandhen	"Neyngey Bunaakah"	Mohamed Abdul Ghanee	Mariyam Ashfa, Mohamed Abdul Ghanee	
2012	Mihashin Furaana Dhandhen	"Mihashin Furaana Dhaandhen"	Adam Haleem Adnan	Mariyam Ashfa, Ahmed Yafiu	
2012	Love Story	"Vaaloabinney"	Ismail Mubarik	Solo	
2012	Love Story	"Maamelaameli"	Ismail Mubarik	Aishath Maain Rasheed	
2014	Insaana	"Insaana" (Promotional Song)	Mohamed Abdul Ghanee	Solo	
2014	Aadheys	"Aadheys" (Remix Version)	Mohamed Abdul Ghanee	Mariyam Ashfa	
2015	Ahsham	"Loabi Vaavaru"	Mohamed Abdul Ghanee	Mariyam Ashfa	
2015	Ahsham	"Loaiybey Mee"	Mohamed Abdul Ghanee	Lahufa Faiz	Appears in Soundtrack
2016	Vafaatheri Kehiveriya	"Loaiybey Mee"	Mohamed Abdul Ghanee	Lahufa Faiz	
2016	Vee Beyvafa	"Ufalaa Hithaamaiga Vaanan Ekee"	Mohamed Abdul Ghanee	Aishath Maain Rasheed	
2016	Baiveriyaa	"Kan'bulo Magey Reehchey"		Solo	
2017	Hahdhu	"Thaubaa Vamey"	Mohamed Abdul Ghanee (Arabic verse by Ismail Mubarik)	Various Artists	
2017	Bos	"Mi Vaavaru"	Mausoom Shakir	Solo	
2017	Bos	"Edhemey Rahumaiy"	Mausoom Shakir	Solo	
2023	Loabi Vevijje	"Gunamun Midhaa"	Mohamed Abdul Ghanee	Mariyam Nafha	
2024	Udhabaani 2	"Thiya Ey Thiya Ey Nufili Han'dhaan"	Ahmed Nashid	Shifa Thaufeeq	
2025	Sorry	"Dhen Sorry"	Kaneeru Abdul Raheem	Solo	

=== Short films ===
Year	Film	Song	Lyricist(s)	Co-artist(s)
2006	Dheke Dhekeves 3	"Magey Jaanu Hibain Dhemey"	Kopee Mohamed Rasheedh	Solo
2008	E Sirru	"E Sirru" (Theme Song)		Solo
2008	Faqeeru Koe	"Faqeeru Koe" (Theme Song)	Ahmed Falah	Solo
2009	Aharennah Loabi Nuvevununama	"Loabin Heelaa Kalaa"	Shifa Thaufeeq	Shifa Thaufeeq
2010	Muhammaage Briefcase	"Muhammaage Briefcase"	Mohamed Abdul Ghanee	Mohamed Abdul Ghanee
2011	Farihibe 3	"Udhuhi Dhooni Fulhu"	Ahmed Falah	Solo
2012	13 Ah Visnaa Dhehaas	"Theyrayah Visnaa Dhehaas"		Mohamed Abdul Ghanee
2013	Siyaasee Koalhun	"Siyaasee Koalhun"	Ahmed Falah	Mohamed Abdul Ghanee
2013	Farihibe 4	"Dhun Elhi Fariyaa"	Ahmed Falah	Solo

=== Television ===
Year	Title	Song	Lyricist(s)	Co-artist(s)
2008	Soora	"Vakivedhiyayas"	Adam Haleem Adnan	Solo
2008	Hama Ekani Kalaayahtakai	"Hama Ekani Kalaayahtakai"		Solo
2009	Mihithah Loabi Dheyshey	"Mihithah Loabi Dheyshey"	Adam Haleem Adnan	Rafiyath Rameeza
2009	Vakinuvaan Bunefaa Vaudheh Nuvanhey?	"Vakinuvaan Bunefaa Vaudheh Nuvanhey?"		Moonisa Khaleel
2009	Ssshhh... Miee Sirreh!	"Miee Sirrekey"		Solo
2010	14 February	"Mila Han'dhuvaruge Mathee"		Mariyam Ashfa
2010	Diary	"Hithu Loabi Hithaa Vakivee Kamaku"	Mohamed Abdul Ghanee	Mariyam Ashfa
2010	Magey Hithakee Hitheh Noon Hey?	"Magey Hithakee Hitheh Noonhey"	Adam Haleem Adnan	Moonisa Khaleel
2011	Hiyy Vanee Inthizaarugai	"Hiyy Vanee Inthizaarugaa"		Solo
2012	Adhives Eloaibah Gadharu Kuran	"Adhives Eloaiybah Qadharu Kuran"	Mausoom Shakir	Mohamed Abdul Ghanee
2012	Adhives Eloaibah Gadharu Kuran	"Vakivedhiyayas"	Adam Haleem Adnan	Unoosha
2015	Vakivumuge Kurin	"Vakivumuge Kurin"	Adam Haleem Adnan	Solo
2018-2020	Huvaa	"Huvaa"	Adam Haleem Adnan	Solo
2018-2020	Huvaa	"Hiyy Mi Edhey"	Mohamed Abdul Ghanee	Mariyam Ashfa
2020	Hanaa	"Hiyy Dhevijjey Kalaayah Huvaa"	Adam Haleem Adnan	Aishath Maain Rasheed

=== Non-Film songs ===
Year	Album/Single	Song	Lyricist(s)	Co-artist(s)
2001	Aimina	"Mihiyy Dhevunee Hithaa Vaathee"	Mohamed Rasheed (Annaarey)	Waheedha
2001	Aimina	"Aimina"	Mohamed Rasheed (Annaarey)	Solo
2001	Aimina	"Hiyy Dheefaa Athuleemaa Kalaa"	Mohamed Rasheed (Annaarey)	Solo
2002	Hithukooru	"Cinderella"	Mohamed Abdul Ghanee	Waves Band
2002	Hithukooru	"Fanara Vileyrey"	Mohamed Abdul Ghanee	Waves Band
2002	Hithukooru	"Leenaa"	Mohamed Abdul Ghanee	Waves Band
2002	Hithukooru	"Heyfilaa Dhaavaruge Kameh"	Mohamed Abdul Ghanee	Waves Band
2002	Hithukooru	"Edhemey Kalaayaa"	Mohamed Abdul Ghanee	Waves Band
2002	Hithukooru	"Kan'bulo Beynunveemaa"	Mohamed Abdul Ghanee	Waves Band
2002	Hithukooru	"Pink & Blue"	Mohamed Abdul Ghanee	Waves Band
2002	Hithukooru	"Elli Kalhin"	Mohamed Abdul Ghanee	Mohamed Abdul Ghanee, Waves Band
2002	Hithukooru	"Mi Kiyaadhey Haadhisaa"	Mohamed Abdul Ghanee	Mohamed Abdul Ghanee, Waves Band
2002	Hithukooru	"Keehhey Vee Olhuvaalee"	Mohamed Abdul Ghanee	Mohamed Shahuban, Waves Band
2002	Fari Hooru	"Vaaloaiybeh Neyngey Bunedhen Nadhaa"		Solo
2002	Fari Hooru	"Hoorehfadha Moonekey"		Waves Band
2002	Fari Hooru	"Such A Feeling"		Waves Band
2002	Fari Hooru	"Saadhaa Dhon Moonaa"		Waves Band
2002	Fari Hooru	"Suni Suni Raatein"		Waves Band
2002	Fari Hooru	"Edhemey Kalaayaa" (Remix Version)	Mohamed Abdul Ghanee	Waves Band
2004	Han'dhuma	"Hunnaaname Gaathugaa Loabivaa"		Solo
2004	Han'dhuma	"Maadhamaa Dheken Mithaan'gaa"		Solo
2004	Ehan'dhaanugai...	"Thanthan Mi Balan"		Solo
2006	Hiyy Dheewaanaa 3	"Hoadheyney Kalaa"	Shareefa Fakhry	Shifa Thaufeeq
2006	Jism	"Hiyy Meygaa Thelhilaifiyey"	Mohamed Abdul Ghanee	Solo
2006	Jism	"Aniyaa Dhey Reyrey"	Mohamed Abdul Ghanee	Solo
2006	Hiyy Roane	"Loabeegaa Vindhey Jahanee"	Ahmed Falah	Mariyam Ashfa
2006	Hiyy Roane	"Thiya Fari Reethi Nazaru"	Adam Haleem Adnan	Solo
2006	Mihan'dhaanugai...	"Dhinveynuge Hithaamaigaa"	Abdul Hannan Moosa Didi	Solo
2006	Oh' Salhi	"Magey Jaanu Hibain Dhemey"	Kopee Mohamed Rasheed	Solo
2007	Hiyy Kiyaathee	"No Entry"		Aminath Nashidha
2007	Single	"Zuvaanun"	Maumoon Abdul Gayoom	Mohamed Abdul Ghanee
2007	Hiyy Dheebalaa	"Masthee Veveneethoa"	Ahmed Nashid (Dharavandhoo)	Aishath Inaya
2007	Single	"Furaavaru Miee"		Mohamed Abdul Ghanee
2007	Thihan'dhaanugai...	"Ufaavaa Zamaaney"	Hussain Rasheed	Solo
2007	Salaamey	"Dhaashey Dhen"	Ahmed Nashid (Dharavandhoo)	Mariyam Rifqa
2008	Hiyy Sihenee	"Ishqu Mee"	Ahmed Falah	Mariyam Unoosha
2008	I Love You	"I Love You"	Ali Saeed (Saittey)	Solo
2008	I Love You	"Saahibaa"	Ali Saeed (Saittey)	Solo
2008	I Love You	"Hairaanvey Fenifaa"	Ali Saeed (Saittey)	Solo
2008	Nasheed 2008	"Wathan Edhey Migothah"		Various Artists
2008	Jaadhuvee Nooru	"Aawaaraa Aawaaraa"	Mohamed Abdul Ghanee	Mariyam Unoosha
2008	Thihan'dhaanugai Remix	"Vaaneyhe Dhuniyeygaa"	Ahmed Midh'hath (Midde)	Solo
2008	Hiyy Dhoovee	"Haalu Hurigothey Mee"		Solo
2009	Yaaraa 4	"Dheki Dheki Kuranee Hithey"	Ahmed Nashid (Dharavandhoo)	Mariyam Rifqa
2009	Mi Dhehiyy Gulhuney	"Annaashey Loabin Han'dhaa"		Solo
2009	Loabivaathee	"Maheynethidhaaney" (Remix Version)	Mohamed Fuwad (Ford)	Shaheedha Riffath
2009	Ehan'dhaanugai Duet	"Meygaavi Alikuri Noorakee Maley"	Yoosuf Mohamedfulhu	Mariyam Nadha Inaz
2009	Vaahan'dhaanakun	"Malaa Thiya Maluge Sharafugaey"		Solo
2009	Vaahan'dhaanakun	"Vaahan'dhaanakun Rovenee" (Group Version)	Mohamed Amir Ahmed	Various Artists
2010	Hiyy Dheewaanaa 4 In 1	"Magey Hithakee Hitheh Noonhey"	Adam Haleem Adnan	Moonisa Khaleel
2010	Ehan'dhaanugai Remix	"Maathoa Bulaasam"		Liusha Mohamed
2010	Vaahan'dhaanakun 2	"Dhillaali Han'dhu"		Solo
2010	Vaahan'dhaanakun 2	"Vaahan'dhaanakun Rovenee" (Group Version)	Mohamed Amir Ahmed	Various Artists
2011	Badhunaseebu Loabi	"Badhunaseebu Loabi"	Hussain Inaz	Solo
2011	Badhunaseebu Loabi	"Reyrey Nidhin"	Hussain Inaz	Aishath Maain Rasheed, Ahmed Ibrahim
2011	Badhunaseebu Loabi	"Dheewaana Kuree"	Hussain Inaz	Mariyam Ashfa
2011	Badhunaseebu Loabi	"Thiyey Edhey Loaiybakee"	Hussain Inaz	Rafiyath Rameeza
2011	Single	"Loabin Mi Lolugaa Bosdhemun"		Solo
2011	Beywafaatheriyaa	"Firumaalaanamey"		Solo
2011	Ehan'dhaanugai Retro	"Nethee Nethee Beynunhey"		Fathimath Nashwa
2011	Tharinge Rey 2011	"Ey Hithaa Ey"	Adam Haleem Adnan	Fathimath Azifa
2012	Bodu Rey 2012	"Vaguthu Faaithu Vaneeyey"		Solo
2012	Raagu	"Halaboli Mihayaathun"	Mohamed Abdul Ghanee, Mohamed Majid (Mezzo)	Solo
2012	Raagu	"Iru Ossemun"	Mohamed Abdul Ghanee	Solo
2012	Raagu	"Beehilaa Vairoalhi"	Mohamed Abdul Ghanee	Solo
2012	Raagu	"Roalhin Fini Roalhin"		Solo
2012	Raagu	"Vaifini Beehilaa"		Solo
2012	Raagu	"Faiyminyeh Fadhan Kujjeh"		Solo
2012	Raagu	"Ladhuge Farudhaa"		Solo
2012	Raagu	"Hamaekani Kalaayahtakaa"		Solo
2012	Raagu	"Rovvaafaa Loabivaa"		Solo
2012	Raagu	"Erey Nidhin Baakeevefaa"		Solo
2012	Vevenee	"Athugaa Hifaalaa"	Ahmed Anwar	Khadheeja Mohamed (Rizoo)
2012	Vevenee	"Ey Aashiqaa"	Ahmed Anwar	Solo
2012	Vevenee	"Shaahee Fari Hin'gumehgaa"		Solo
2012	Vevenee	"Dhin E Aniyaa"		Ahmed Anwar, Vaau
2012	Ehan'dhaanugai 1433	"Hithakah Baareh Nethiyyaa"	Mohamed Abdul Ghanee	Khadheeja Mohamed (Rizoo)
2012	Ehan'dhaanugai 1433	"Ehan'dhaanuge Asaruthakey"	Mohamed Abdul Ghanee	Various Artists
2012	Hithuge Enme Funminun: S01	"Mee Ilaahiyya Naseebaa Rahumaa"	Mohamed Abdul Ghanee	Solo
2012	Hithuge Enme Funminun: S01	"Magey Rankolhu Vee Ekaherivefaa"	Mohamed Abdul Ghanee	Mira Mohamed Majid
2012	Tharinge Rey 2012	"Maheynethidhaaney"	Mohamed Fuwad (Ford)	Nuzuha
2012	Single	"Kaarisaa"		Aishath Maain Rasheed, Mohamed Abdul Ghanee
2012	Qaumee Dhuvas 1433	"Nujehi Fahathah"		Various Artists
2012	Loabivumakee	"Thiya Malugaa Evaa Karugan'du"	Ismail Shameem	Fathimath Zoona
2013	Hiyy Dheebalaa 3	"Dhaashey Dhen"	Ahmed Nashid (Dharavandhoo)	Mariyam Rifqa
2013	Hiyy Dheebalaa 3	"Loaiybakah Ithubaaru Kurumeh"		Solo
2013	MDP	"Leyn Favaathee"		Rafiyath Rameeza
2013	Hithuge Enme Funminun: S02	"Haqqakeebaa Haqqakeebaa"		Rafiyath Rameeza
2014	Single	"Maruvaan Magey Hiyy" (Cover Version)		Solo
2014	Tharinge Rey 2014	"Dheynan Hithaa Jaanaa"		Samaha Moosa Didi
2014	Vaahan'dhaanakun 3	"Aakujjekey Dhasvee Fahun"	Abdulla Sodhiq	Solo
2014	Vaahan'dhaanakun 3	"Vaahan'dhaanakun Rovenee" (Group Version)	Mohamed Amir Ahmed	Various Artists
2015	Gellunu Haaru	"Dhaanee Dhekilan"		Hawwa Ashra
2015	People's Cup 2015	"People's Cup" (Official Song)	Mohamed Abdul Ghanee	Solo
2015	Single	"Vaathee Ma Kaireegaa" (Cover Version)	Fathimath Nahula	Aminath Lamha Latheef
2015	Single	"Lolakah Ninjeh Naadhey" (Cover Version)	Easa Shareef	Solo
2015	Makita 2015	"Makita" (Official Song)		Mohamed Naffan Amir
2015	Hithuge Enme Funminun: S03	"Hithuge Funminun"	Mohamed Abdul Ghanee	Solo
2015	Enme Reethi: S01	"Ishaaraaiyhey Kuree"	Ahmed Haleem	Solo
2015	Enme Reethi: S01	"Rankula Jehi Loabin"	Hussain Rasheed	Solo
2015	Enme Reethi: S01	"Dhushun Edhihuri Araamaa"	Mausoom Shakir	Solo
2015	Enme Reethi: S01	"Rey Nidheegaaves Dhusheemey"	Mausoom Shakir	Hawwa Ashra
2015	Single	"Inthizaarugaa"	Hussain	Solo
2016	Single	"Kalaa Dhen Midhuniyeyn" (Cover Version)	Abdul Raheem Abdulla	Rafiyath Rameeza
2016	Single	"Heelaa Gothun"		Solo
2016	Single	"Eheetheri Vamaathoa"	Ismail Mubarik	Various Artists
2017	Single	"Loabikan"	Ali Waheed	Solo
2017	Jumhooree 50	"Jumhooree 50 Mee"	Adam Naseer Ibrahim	Various Artists
2017	Qaumee Dhuvas 1439: Bahuruva	"Qaumee Nidhaa"	Adam Shareef Umar	Various Artists
2017	Qaumee Dhuvas 1439: Bahuruva	"Bahuruva Thafaathas"	Abdulla Afeef	Various Artists
2018	Han'dhakee Thee Hiyy Edhey	"Meygaavi Alikuri Noorakee Maley"	Yoosuf Mohamedfulhu	Rafiyath Rameeza
2018	Dhivehi Fuluhunge 85th Anniversary	"Dhivehi Fuluhun"	Adam Abdul Rahuman	Various Artists
2018	Dhivehi Fuluhunge 85th Anniversary	"Ey Shaheedhee Zuvaan"		Mohamed Abdul Ghanee, Majeed Ismail
2018	Ooredoo Mas Race	"Ooredoo Mas Race"		Samaha Moosa Didi
2018	Saff Champions 2018	"Aharemenge Ummeedhu"		Various Artists
2018	Iboo 2018	"Vee Haalehga Vaan"		Mohamed Abdul Ghanee, Ahmed Ibrahim
2019	Qaumee Dhuvas 1441: Mintheege Hamahamakan	"Qaanoonee Dhaairaa Kurieruvumugaa"		Mohamed Abdul Ghanee, Mariyam Ashfa, Amaanee
2019	Zakaathu Fund	"Dheelathi Vamaathoa"	Adam Naseer Ibrahim	Abdulla Rasheed
2019	Olympics 2019	"Hoadhaifi Kaamiyaabu"		Mohamed Abdul Ghanee, Mariyam Ashfa
2019	Iskandharu School 2019	"Qaumee Roohun"		Mariyam Ashfa, Eanash, Amaanee
2020	Single	"Enmen Ekee"	Mohamed Abdul Ghanee	Mohamed Abdul Ghanee
2020	Single	"Ilaahee Mibin" (Cover Version)	Abdul Rasheed Hussain	Various Artists
2020	Loabi Nulibunas	"Mihithugaa Thiya Vindhu Jahayey"		Rafiyath Rameeza
2020	Loabi Nulibunas	"Haadhahaa Loaiybey Buneemaa"		Solo
2020	Loabi Nulibunas	"Thasveeru Hithugaa Fevifaa"		Solo
2020	Single	"Gunamun Midhaa"	Hussain	Mariyam Ashfa
2021	Single	"Zoonaa"	Mohamed Abdul Ghanee	Solo
2024	Eid Mubarik	"Fariveli Finifenmaluge Vahun" (Cover Version)		Various Artists
2024	Single	"Gaamun Mieebu"	Abdulla Hilmee	Solo
2024	Single	"Finifini Reyakau" (Cover Version)	Mohamed Naseem	Solo
2025	Araairu	"Lhenveriyakah Ma Veenama"	Abdul Raheem Abdulla	Solo
2025	Araairu	"Loa Magey"	Abdul Raheem Abdulla	Solo
2025	Araairu	"Hithehge Funun"	Abdul Raheem Abdulla	Solo
2025	Araairu	"Dhaaneyey Miadhu In'gey"	Abdul Raheem Abdulla	Solo
2025	Araairu	"Mee Magey Raajje"	Abdul Raheem Abdulla	Various Artists

=== Religious / Madhaha ===
Year	Album/Single	Song	Lyricist(s)	Co-artist(s)
2008	Faanthari	"Visnaalumun Hithah Sifavanee"	Abdulla Afeef	Solo
2008	Faanthari	"Bahaarey Dhuniyeah Mi Aee"	Abdulla Afeef	Solo
2009	Dhoadhi	"Allah Akbar"	Abdulla Afeef	Ahmed Anwar
2009	Dhoadhi	"Sallallah Alaa Muhammadh"	Abdulla Afeef	Ahmed Anwar

== Filmography ==
Year	Title	Role	Notes	Ref(s)
2009	Mohamma Gaadiyaa	Himself	Guest role; "Episode 2"	
2010	Dhin Veynuge Hithaamaigaa	Himself	Special appearance in the song "Annaashey Hinithun Velamaa"	
2010	Veeraana	Himself	Special appearance in the promotional song "Veeraana"	
2023	Loabi Vevijje	Tholal's friend	Special appearance	

== Accolades ==
Year	Award	Category	Nominated work	Result	Ref(s)
2010	Maldives Video Music Awards	Best Duet Song	"Mihithah Loabi Dheyshey" - Mihithah Loabi Dheyshey	Won	
2011	2nd SunFM Awards	Most Entertaining Male Vocalist		Nominated	
2015	6th Gaumee Film Awards	Best Male Playback Singer	"Kon Kahala Lolhumeh" - Heyonuvaane	Nominated	
2016	7th Gaumee Film Awards	Best Male Playback Singer	"Dheyshey Naa" - Hiyy Yaara Dheefa	Nominated	
2017	8th Gaumee Film Awards	Best Original Song	"Vaa Loabi Dhulun" - Vafaatheri Kehiveriya	Nominated	
2017	8th Gaumee Film Awards	Best Original Song	"Gandhee Huvaa" - Ahsham	Nominated	
2018	National Award of Recognition	Performing Arts - Singing and music composition		Won	
