= Vakinuvinama =

2010 film directed by Amjad Ibrahim

- Official film poster
- Directed by: Amjad Ibrahim
- Written by: Hassan Gasim
- Produced by: Fathimath Shifa
- Starring: Niuma Mohamed; Ravee Farooq; Ali Seezan
- Cinematography: Hassan Haleem
- Edited by: Hussain Adam
- Music by: Shiuz
- Production company: See Far Productions
- Release date: December 4, 2010
- Running time: 76 minutes
- Country: Maldives
- Language: Dhivehi

Vakinuvinama is a 2010 Maldivian horror film directed by Amjad Ibrahim. Produced by Fathimath Shifa under See Far Productions, the film stars Niuma Mohamed, Ravee Farooq and Ali Seezan in pivotal roles.

== Premise ==
Rashaga (Niuma Mohamed) is in a romantic relationship with an indolent and short-tempered man, Ihusan (Ravee Farooq). Despite her family's disapproval to their relationship due to Ihusan's indecorous behavior, Rashaga refuses to leave him since he is her first love. One day, Rashaga's younger brother was saved by Zaid (Ali Seezan) from drowning, which helped him secure a place in her family's position. Ihusan breaks up with Rashaga and she marries Zaid as requested by her father, Waheed (Ali Shameel). Soon after she gives birth to a baby girl, Rasha feels sick and fails to be cured by any doctoral medication. One night, Waheed follows Zaid to the forest and discovers his true identity which forces him to do everything possible to save his family.

== Cast ==
- Niuma Mohamed as Rashaga
- Ravee Farooq as Ihusan
- Ali Shameel as Waheed
- Ali Seezan as Zaid
- Fauziyya Hassan as Ameena
- Nadhiya Hassan as Rashfa
- Hamdhan Farooq as Hussain

== Release ==
The film was premiered on 4 December 2010. Upon release, the film received negative reviews from critics and fared poorly at box-office.

== Soundtrack ==
Track listing
No.	Title	Lyrics	Music	Singer(s)	Length
1.	"Vakinuvinama"	Mohamed Abdul Ghanee	Ibrahim Zaid Ali	Moonisa Khaleel
2.	"Handhuvaru Bin Ujaalaa"	Mohamed Abdul Ghanee	Ibrahim Zaid Ali	Mohamed Abdul Ghanee, Mariyam Ashfa
3.	"Thiya Loabeegaa"	Mohamed Abdul Ghanee	Ibrahim Zaid Ali	Ibrahim Zaid Ali, Mariyam Ashfa
