= Faqeeru Koe =

2008 short-film directed by Ahmed Falah

- Official film poster
- Directed by: Ahmed Falah
- Screenplay by: Ahmed Falah
- Produced by: Mohamed Abdulla
- Starring: Mohamed Abdulla; Sheela Najeeb
- Cinematography: Ibrahim Moosa
- Edited by: Abdulla Muaz
- Music by: Ibrahim Nifar
- Production company: Dhekedheke Ves Production
- Release date: December 30, 2008
- Running time: 55 minutes
- Country: Maldives
- Language: Dhivehi

Faqeeru Koe is a 2008 Maldivian period short-film written and directed by Ahmed Falah. Produced by Mohamed Abdulla under Dhekedheke Ves Production, the film stars Mohamed Abdulla, Sheela Najeeb in pivotal roles.

== Premise ==
Kasim Fulhu (Mohamed Abdulla) and Sanfa Fulhu (Sheela Najeeb) are an underprivileged married couple who has a large family of six children. Despite their financial instability, the family manages every shortcomings, though the husband believes in a philosophy where a man shall never confide in a woman and shall never disclose the financial details to his wife. One day, the family were attended by two generous businessmen from the atoll, where they lend some money to Kasim Fulhu who hides all the statements and details from Sanfa Fulhu.

Their lives take an unexpected downfall when Sanfa Fulhu sells a cadjan unbeknownst to her that Kasim Fulhu has hidden all the money inside the cadjan. The businessmen return to the island and queries the couple on their limitations. Expecting a change in their lives, the men handover the money to Sanfa Fulhu this time, who makes a positive change to their lives.

== Cast ==
- Mohamed Abdulla as Kasim Fulhu
- Sheela Najeeb as Sanfa Fulhu
- Mufeed as Razzaq
- Naeem as Thahhaan
- Ali Waheed as Ali Fulhu
- Matheen as Ibrahim Fulhu
- Mohamed as Mohamedbe
- Siththi as Siththi
- Aminafulhu as Fathimaidhaitha
- Abdul Kareem as Edhurube
- Ahmed as Seytu

== Soundtrack ==
Track listing
No.	Title	Lyrics	Music	Singer(s)	Length
1.	"Hadi Fanuge Dhandi Fanuge Jifuti"	Ahmed Falah	Ibrahim Zaid Ali	Ibrahim Zaid Ali

== Accolades ==
Year	Award	Category	Recipients	Result	Ref.
2011	1st Maldives Film Awards	Best Film - Short film	Faqeeru Koe	Won	
2011	1st Maldives Film Awards	Best Director - Short film	Ahmed Falah	Won	
2011	1st Maldives Film Awards	Best Actor - Short film	Mohamed Abdulla	Won	
2011	1st Maldives Film Awards	Best Actress - Short film	Sheela Najeeb	Won	
2015	6th Gaumee Film Awards	Best Film - Short film	Faqeeru Koe	Won	
