= Mohamma Gaadiyaa =

Maldivian Comedy television drama series

- Genre: Comedy drama
- Screenplay by: Mohamed Abdulla
- Directed by: Hassan Haleem
- Music by: Ibrahim Zaid Ali
- Country of origin: Maldives
- Original language: Divehi
- No. of seasons: 1
- No. of episodes: 5

Production
- Cinematography: Hassan Haleem

Original release
- Release: 21 August – 18 September 2009

Mohamma Gaadiyaa is a Maldivian Comedy television drama series developed for Television Maldives, directed by Hassan Haleem. The series stars film stars Mohamed Abdulla, Niuma Mohamed and Ismail Rasheed in main roles. The series was aired on 21 August 2009 on the occasion of 1430 Ramadan.

== Cast and characters ==
=== Main roles ===
- Mohamed Abdulla as Mohamma
- Niuma Mohamed as Raqeeba

=== Recurring roles ===
- Ismail Rasheed as Burukhan
- Ali Shameel as Yoosube
- Koyya Hassan Manik as Adambe
- Hamdhan Farooq as Labeeb; a DJ artist

=== Guest roles ===
- Ravee Farooq as a choreographer (Episode 1)
- Ibrahim Zaid Ali as a music composer (Episode 2)
- Abdul Latheef as a customer (Episode 3)
- Hussain Shibau as Yoosube's friend (Episode 4)
- Aminath Rana as a customer (Episode 5)
- Mohamed Manik as a customer (Episode 5)
- Nadhiya Hassan as a customer (Episode 5)
- Aishath Rasheedha as Mohamma's mother (Episode 5)

== Episodes ==
| No. in season | Title | Directed by | Original release date |
|---|---|---|---|
| 1 | "Episode 01" | Hassan Haleem | August 21, 2009 |
Mohamma (Mohamed Abdulla), an ambitious man who does multiple works for living, desperately keeps seeking for other jobs including choreography to sailing. In the meantime, he becomes romantically attracted to a similar woman, Raqeeba (Niuma Mohamed) who also does multiple works from being a dustwoman to cleaner.
| 2 | "Episode 02" | Hassan Haleem | August 28, 2009 |
Realizing the similarities in their life circumstances, Mohamma and Raqeeba marry which becomes the centre of enviousness to Mohamma's friend, Burukhan (Ismail Rasheed). The couple tries to explore several talents of Muhamma from taxi driving to singing but fails in all fields.
| 3 | "Episode 03" | Hassan Haleem | September 4, 2009 |
With the help of Adambe (Koyya Hassan Manik), the couple expands their cart business, much to the surprise of their rival, Yoosube (Ali Shameel).
| 4 | "Episode 04" | Hassan Haleem | September 11, 2009 |
| 5 | "Episode 05" | Hassan Haleem | September 18, 2009 |

== Soundtrack ==
Track listing
| No. | Title | Singer(s) | Length |
|---|---|---|---|
| 1. | "Naseebu Loabinney" | Abdulla Nashif |
| 2. | "Rangalhu Thedhuveri" | Mukhthar Adam |
| 3. | "Firumaalaafa Kanaa Athun" | Ibrahim Zaid Ali |
| 4. | "Balaaleema Dhenyaa Dhee" | Abdulla Nashif |
| 5. | "Farudhaa Nagaafa Ey" | Mohamed Abdul Ghanee, Ibrahim Zaid Ali, Niuma Mohamed |
| 6. | "Nana Huvafen Dhusheemey" | Ibrahim Zaid Ali |
