= Hussain Nooradeen =

Maldivian producer and actor

Hussain Nooradeen Nasir
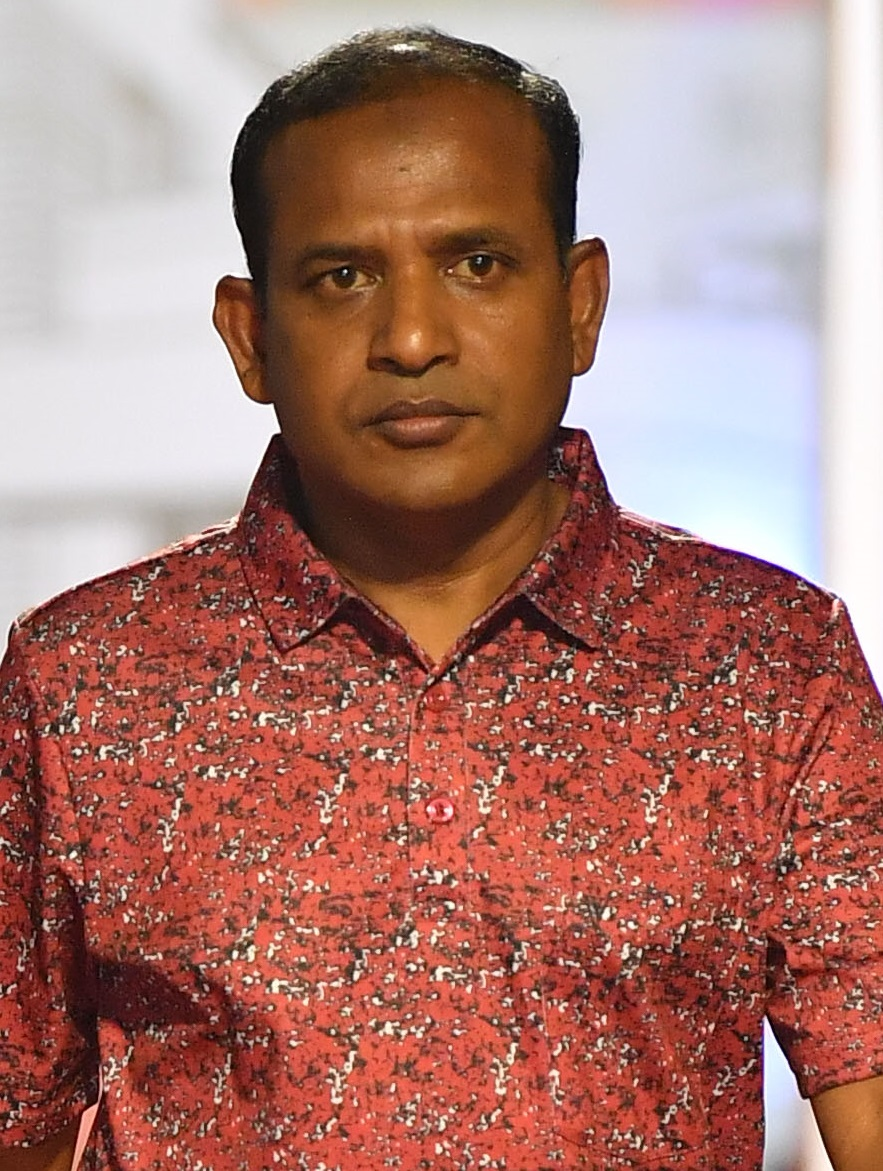
- Nooradeen attending Olympus reopening ceremony, 2023
- Born: 3 April 1969 (age 57); S. Maradhoo, Maldives
- Occupations: Producer, actor
- Years active: 2000–present

Hussain Nooradeen Nasir (born 3 April 1969) is a Maldivian film producer and actor.

== Career ==
Nooradeen initially appeared in small roles in films like Himeyn Dhuniye (2000) and office drama Hulhukolhu (2000), before expanding his career as a producer with studio albums including Boduraalhu (2001). In 2003, he played the role, Waheed, a businessman who is heartbroken in love and desperately waiting for a minor to grow up before asking her for marriage, in the television series, Ujaalaa Raasthaa. Co-directed by Mohamed Shareef and Muawiyath Anwar, it narrates the journey of two best friends in three generations. The series developed as an attempt to aware the audience on several social issues, was widely accepted by the audience and received positive reviews from critics.

He next appeared in a small role in Mohamed Shareef-directed drama series Loabi Vaanama (2005) where he played the role of Waheed, an infedile husband. The first episode of the series was met with lukewarm response from the audience due to the different "visualization style" of the director and the scene arrangement by screenwriter. However, from the second episode onwards, the series picked up and become a success among the critics and audience.

The following year, he played the title role in the short film Salhibe (2006) and was a part of the cast in the third and fourth installment of the Dheke Dhekeves. He also served as the producer for the first installment of the horror short film Vasvaas (2006) and Umurahvess Inthizaaru Kuraanan (2007). Apart from Salhibe, he also produced and played the title role in Seedhibe (2009). One of the most notable work of Nooradeen as a producer is Moomin Fuad-directed crime tragedy drama Loodhifa. Featuring an ensemble cast, the film deals with several social issues in the society told from different perspectives of the characters. Made on a budget of MVR 600,000, the film was declared a commercial failure though it received wide critical acclaim, praising the performance of cast and the film's "realism" in its language, characters and their attitude.

== Filmography ==
=== Feature Film ===
Year	Title	Role	Notes	Ref(s)
2000	Himeyn Dhuniye	Taxi driver	Special appearance	
2006	Hithuge Edhun	Shahil's friend		
2006	Hiyani	Katheeb		

=== Television and web series ===
Year	Title	Role	Notes	Ref(s)
2000	Hulhukolhu		Office drama	
2003	Ujaalaa Raasthaa	Khalidh	Main role; 13 episodes	
2005	Baiveriyaa	Badhuru	Main role; 14 episodes	
2005	Loabi Vaanama	Waheed	Guest role; 2 episodes	
2005	Fukkashi	Various roles	Main role; 7 episodes	
2006	Kuramey Vadhaaee Salaam	Shop keeper	Guest role; "Episode 11"	
2019	Mhendhan	Usman	Recurring role; 5 episodes	

=== Short film ===
Year	Title	Role	Notes
2004	Falhi Sikunthu 1	Habeeb	
2006	Mohamma Kalo V/S Bao Kalo	Seytu	
2006	Dheke Dhekeves 3	Ghaffar	
2006	Salhibe	Salhibe	Also co-producer
2006	Dheke Dhekeves 4	Ghaffar	Special appearance
2008	Salhibe 2	Salhibe	Also co-producer
2009	Seedhibe	Seedhibe	Also the producer

=== Other work ===
Year	Title	Director	Producer	Notes
2000	Hulhukolhu	Yes		Office drama
2001	Boduraalhu		Yes	Audio album
2006	Keehve..?		Yes	Audio album
2006	Vasvaas 1		Yes	Short film
2007	Umurahvess Inthizaaru Kuraanan		Yes	Short film; co-produced with Ahmed Azmeel
2007	Paruvaana		Yes	Short film; co-produced with Ibrahim
2009	Fahun Rangalhuvaane		Yes	Short film
2009	Karuna Vee Beyvafa		Yes	Feature film
2009	Seedhibe		Yes	Short film
2009	Santhi Mariyan'bu 3		Yes	Short film
2011	Loodhifa		Yes	Feature film
2012	Love Story		Yes	Feature film
2019	Mhendhan	Yes		Web series
2025	Abadhah		Yes	Feature film
