= Vafaatheri Kehiveriya =

- Official film poster
- Directed by: Ali Seezan
- Written by: Ibrahim Waheedh
- Screenplay by: Ali Seezan
- Produced by: Mohamed Abdullah
- Starring: Ali Seezan; Maleeha Waheed; Zeenath Abbas; Ahmed Saeed
- Cinematography: Ibrahim Wisan
- Edited by: Ali Seezan
- Production company: Dhedhekeves Production
- Release date: May 10, 2016
- Country: Maldives
- Language: Dhivehi
- Budget: MVR 500,000

Vafaatheri Kehiveriya is a 2016 Maldivian romantic film directed by Ali Seezan. Produced by Mohamed Abdullah under Dhedhekeves Production, the film stars Ali Seezan, Maleeha Waheed, Zeenath Abbas and Ahmed Saeed in pivotal roles. The film was released on 10 May 2016. The film was based on Ibrahim Waheedh's novel Vanhanaa. Apart from four scenes, the whole film was shot in Ha. Kelaa.

== Cast ==
- Ali Seezan as Fayaa
- Maleeha Waheed as Nuzoo
- Zeenath Abbas as Ainthu
- Ahmed Saeed as Iburey
- Ahmed Azmeel as Lahche

== Soundtrack ==
Track listing
| No. | Title | Singer(s) | Length |
|---|---|---|---|
| 1. | "Ummeedhu" | Mohamed Abdul Ghanee, Mariyam Ashfa |
| 2. | "Mooney Thee Hiyy Edhey" | Hassan Jalal |
| 3. | "Loaibbey Miee" | Ibrahim Zaid Ali, Lahufa Faiz |
| 4. | "Vaa Loabi Dhulun" | Mariyam Ashfa |
| 5. | "Vafaatheri Kehiveriya (Title song)" | Rafiyath Rameeza |

== Response ==
The film received a mixed to negative reception from critics. Ahmed Nadheem from Avas blamed the title of the film for giving the impression of an "old typical" taste to the film. He further criticised the acting of lead actress Maleeha Waheedh; for her weak portrayal of the character and bad dialogue delivery. Besides, he also criticised the acting of Zeenath Abbas and Ahmed Azmeel. However, he liked the main storyline and the plot twists of the film. Aishath Maahaa from the same publication echoed similar sentiments for the film. She was pleased with the overall make up and styling carried out in the film, however was disappointed that it did not show the "island life".

The film was premiered at Olympus on 10 May 2016. After a few shows, the production team had to cease the screening of the film due to the difficulty in getting further dates in Olympus and also due to bad weather conditions. The film was later scheduled to be released at Schwack Cinema, however was cancelled due to less tickets than minimum being sold.

== Accolades ==
| Award | Category | Recipient(s) and nominee(s) | Result | Ref(s) |
|---|---|---|---|---|
| 8th Gaumee Film Awards | Original Song | Ibrahim Zaid Ali for "Vaa Loabi Dhulun" | Nominated | |
| 8th Gaumee Film Awards | Best Lyricist | Adam Haleem Adnan for "Ummeedh" | Nominated | |
| 8th Gaumee Film Awards | Male Playback Singer | Mohamed Abdul Ghanee for "Ummeedh" | Nominated | |
| 8th Gaumee Film Awards | Best Female Playback Singer | Mariyam Ashfa for "Vaa Loabi Dhulun" | Nominated | |
| 8th Gaumee Film Awards | Best Background Music | Ibrahim Nifar | Nominated | |
