= Mohamed Abdul Ghanee =

Maldivian playback singer and songwriter (born 1978)

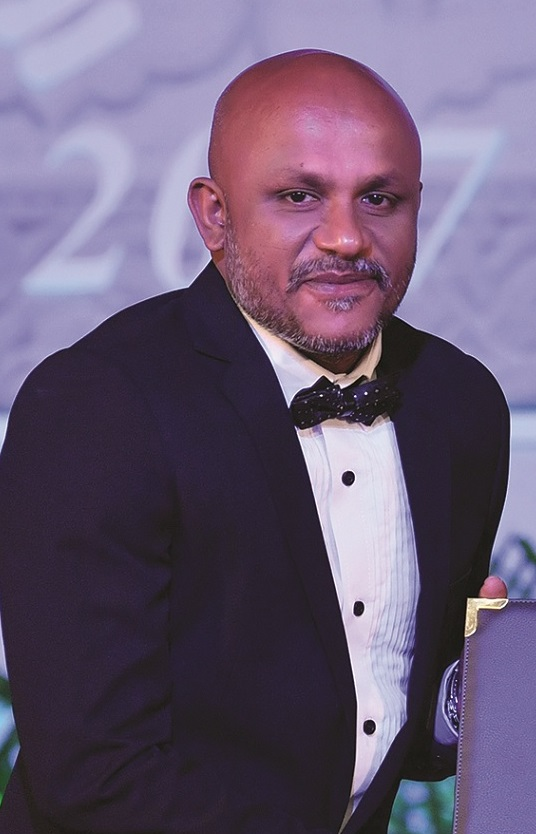
- Ghanee receiving the National Award of Recognition, 2017
- Born: 15 April 1978 (age 48); Lh. Naifaru, Maldives
- Occupations: Playback singer; songwriter
- Years active: 1999–present
- Spouses: Mariyam Ashfa (divorced); Nashfa (m. 2025)
- Children: Yoosuf Alsan Mohamed (deceased)
- Musical career
- Genres: Pop; filmi; electronic
- Instrument: Vocals

Mohamed Abdul Ghanee (born 15 April 1978), commonly known as Theyravaa is a Maldivian singer and songwriter.

== Early life and career ==
Born to a musical family, Ghanee had no interest in music even when his siblings spend their time in jamming and singing. While studying at Madhrasathul Ifthithaah, he participated in the Inter-house singing competition, on a request by his elder brother. His performance was well noted by judges and received several prizes. The success was followed by his next performance, the song "Theyravaa" which caught the attention of a member from the local music band Zero Degree Atoll, who insisted him to perform a different version of the song in the Fannaanunge Muzikee Eid Show (1992). The version, which marks his first break in the industry, was loved by the audience and he was considered "a promising singer".

At the age of fourteen, Ghanee relocated to Male' and was enrolled to Ahmadhiyya International School and later to Malé English School which allowed him to showcase his talent as a singer. From 1996 to 1999, Ghanee was a prominent face in the Interschool Singing Competition, in which he was awarded as the Best Performer of the Competition in the year 1999. He then worked as a mentor to other students participating in the same competition. After completing studies, Ghanee joined the local band "Amazon Jade" and started performing in resorts, as a profession. Afterwards, he started performing in several music shows and national gatherings. During the time, he was more involved with the studio albums than film songs.

In 2001, Ghanee joined "Waves Band", a group formed by Dhivehi Raajjeyge Adu, where he contributed to several studio albums. His sensuous rendition of the song 'Vee Reethi Neyngey Neyngey" from the album Yaaraa turned to be a major breakthrough in his career, where he was roped in to perform several film songs by music directors and producers. He particularly mentioned music directors, Ibrahim Nifar and Ibrahim Zaid Ali as "constant pillars" in accelerating his music career. At 6th Gaumee Film Awards ceremony, Ghanee received two nominations as the Best Male Playback Singer for his renditions in the song "Bunaa Hiyy Vey" from Zalzalaa En'buri Aun (2010) and "Vee Banavefaa Adhu Falhuvefaa" from Veeraana, where he won his first award for the former. In the following ceremony, he was bestowed with the title for a second time for his classical rendition in the romantic song "Loabivaa Ey" from Hiyy Yaara Dheefa (2011), while also being nominated for the song "Vejjey Fanaa" from the same film.

== Discography ==
=== Feature film ===
Year	Film	Song	Lyricist(s)	Co-artist(s)	Notes
2005	Hureemey Inthizaarugaa	"Ma Dhuru Nuvaanan"	Easa Shareef	Shifa Thaufeeq	
2005	Hureemey Inthizaarugaa	"Bunebalaa Loabivey Bunebalaa"	Easa Shareef	Solo	Appears in Soundtrack album
2006	Hithuge Edhun	"Koreh Koreh"	Adam Haleem Adnan	Solo	Appears in Soundtrack album
2006	Hithuge Edhun	"Meeyey Muhammaa"	Ahmed Nashid (Dharavandhoo)	Aminath Nashidha	Appears in Soundtrack album
2006	Vaaloabi Engeynama	"Vaaloabi En'geynama" (Duet Version)	Mohamed Abdul Ghanee	Aishath Inaya	
2006	Vaaloabi Engeynama	"Jaadhooga Dheewana"	Mohamed Abdul Ghanee	Shifa Thaufeeq	
2008	Yoosuf	"Hairaan Vaahaa Chaaley Thiloa"	Adam Haleem Adnan	Solo	
2008	Yoosuf	"Shakuvaa"	Mausoom Shakir	Solo	
2009	Hiyy Rohvaanulaa	"Hammaa Muhammaa"	Mohamed Abdul Ghanee	Solo	Appears in Soundtrack album
2009	Karuna Vee Beyvafa	"Karunavee Beyvafaa"	Mohamed Abdul Ghanee	Moonisa Khaleel	
2009	Karuna Vee Beyvafa	"Karunavee Beyvafaa" (Remix Version)	Mohamed Abdul Ghanee	Ibrahim Zaid Ali	Appears in Soundtrack album
2009	E Dharifulhu	"Baakeevefaa"	Mohamed Abdul Ghanee	Shifa Thaufeeq	
2009	E Dharifulhu	"Vindhu Hithaa"	Mohamed Abdul Ghanee	Aminath Shaufa Saeed	
2010	Jinni	"Loabivaa"	Mohamed Abdul Ghanee	Aishath Maain Rasheed	
2010	Jinni	"Roveyhaavey"	Mohamed Abdul Ghanee	Shifa Thaufeeq	
2010	Jinni	"Fenifaa Kalaa"	Ahmed Haleem	Mariyam Ashfa	
2010	Maafeh Neiy	"Soora Naya Fenuneema"	Mohamed Abdul Ghanee	Maya Nasih	
2010	Dhin Veynuge Hithaamaigaa	"Annaashey Hinithun Velamaa"	Mohamed Abdul Ghanee	Various artists	
2010	Zalzalaa En'buri Aun	"Bunaa Hiyyvey"	Mohamed Abdul Ghanee	Solo	
2010	Veeraana	"Vee Banavefaa"	Adam Haleem Adnan	Solo	
2010	Veeraana	"Veeraana" (Promotional Song)	Adam Haleem Adnan	Various artists	Appears in Soundtrack album
2010	Fanaa	"Yaaru Kairi Veybalaa"	Ahmed Nashidh (Dharavandhoo)	Aishath Maain Rasheed	
2010	Niuma	"Dheevaana Hiyy"	Mohamed Abdul Ghanee	Aminath Shaufa Saeed	
2010	Niuma	"Vindhaa Kulhey"	Mohamed Abdul Ghanee	Various artists	
2010	Niuma	"Niuma" (Promotional Song)	Mohamed Abdul Ghanee	Ibrahim Zaid Ali, Ahmed Ibrahim, Shammoon Mohamed	Appears in Soundtrack album
2010	Mendhamuge Evaguthu	"Ibaraskalaange Niyaafulhah"		Solo	
2010	Vakinuvinama	"Handhuvaru Bin Ujaalaa"	Mohamed Abdul Ghanee	Mariyam Ashfa	
2010	Heyonuvaane	"Neyndhen Ufaa"	Mohamed Abdul Ghanee	Solo	
2011	Hafaraaiy	"Finiveye Hiyy"	Easa Shareef	Shifa Thaufeeq	
2011	Hafaraaiy	"Hafaraaiy Hafaraaiy"		Shifa Thaufeeq	
2011	Hafaraaiy	"Vevunee Loaibey"	Mohamed Abdul Ghanee	Solo	
2011	Hafaraaiy	"Sissaigen Dhaahaavey" (Promotional Song)	Mohamed Abdul Ghanee	Mariyam Ashfa	Appears in Soundtrack album
2011	Hafaraaiy	"Loaiybahtakaa Dheefaanamey"	Mohamed Abdul Ghanee	Mariyam Ashfa	Appears in Soundtrack album
2011	Sazaa	"Keehvehey"	Mohamed Abdul Ghanee	Solo	
2011	E Bappa	"Bappa Ekey"		Solo	
2011	14 Vileyrey	"Loabeegaa" (Male Version)	Mohamed Abdul Ghanee	Solo	
2011	14 Vileyrey	"Thaureef"	Mohamed Abdul Ghanee	Mariyam Ashfa	
2011	Laelaa	"Dhuniyein Laelaa"		Aminath Nashidha	
2011	Hiyy Yaara Dheefa	"Vindhaa Furaanain" (Promotional song)	Mohamed Abdul Ghanee	Ibrahim Zaid Ali, Mariyam Ashfa	
2011	Hiyy Yaara Dheefa	"Loabivaa Ey"	Mohamed Abdul Ghanee	Mariyam Ashfa	
2011	Hiyy Yaara Dheefa	"Vejjey Fanaa"	Mohamed Abdul Ghanee	Solo	
2011	Insaaf	"Ranyaa"	Mohamed Abdul Ghanee	Rafiyath Rameeza	
2012	Mihashin Furaana Dhandhen	"Neyngey Bunaakah"	Mohamed Abdul Ghanee	Ibrahim Zaid Ali, Mariyam Ashfa	
2012	Mihashin Furaana Dhandhen	"Iyye Dhuh Huvafen"	Mausoom Shakir	Mariyam Ashfa	
2012	Love Story	"Alathu Loabi"	Mohamed Abdul Ghanee	Mariyam Ashfa	
2012	Love Story	"Inthihaa Loabivey"	Mohamed Abdul Ghanee	Solo	
2013	Fathis Handhuvaruge Feshun 3D	"Edhemey Kalaayah Inthihaa" (Male Version)	Shifa Thaufeeq	Solo	
2013	Fathis Handhuvaruge Feshun 3D	"Fathis Handhuvaru Hekivedheyney"	Ismail Mubarik	Solo	
2013	Fathis Handhuvaruge Feshun 3D	"Kuramey Kalaayah Inthizaaru"	Ismail Mubarik	Solo	
2013	Fathis Handhuvaruge Feshun 3D	"Vamey Fun Khiyaalu Thakugaa"	Ismail Mubarik	Shifa Thaufeeq	
2013	Dhilakani	"Inthihaayah"		Mariyam Ashfa, Ahmed Shabeen	
2014	24 Gadi Iru	"Sandhuravirey"		Khadheeja Mohamed	
2014	Aadheys	"Aadheys" (Theme Song)	Mohamed Abdul Ghanee	Solo	
2016	Vafaatheri Kehiveriya	"Ummeedhu"	Adam Haleem Adnan	Mariyam Ashfa	
2016	Vee Beyvafa	"Hithugaa Foruvifaa Yaara"	Mohamed Abdul Ghanee	Solo	
2016	Baiveriyaa	"Neyngey Gotheh Vey"	Abdulla Muaz Yoosuf	Mira Mohamed Majid	
2017	Naughty 40	"Farudhaa Nagan Noolheyshey"	Mohamed Abdul Ghanee	Mariyam Ashfa	
2017	Hahdhu	"Giritee Loabin"	Beyya Huhthu	Mariyam Ashfa	
2017	Hahdhu	"Udhuhilamaa"	Mohamed Abdul Ghanee	Mariyam Ashfa	
2017	Hahdhu	"Beehilaashey"	Mohamed Abdul Ghanee	Mariyam Ashfa	
2017	Hahdhu	"Thaubaa"	Mohamed Abdul Ghanee (Arabic verse by Ismail Mubarik)	Various artists	
2017	Neydhen Vakivaakah	"Abadhu Ekugaa Vaanee"	Mohamed Abdul Ghanee	Mariyam Ashfa	
2017	Neydhen Vakivaakah	"Neydhen Vakivaakah"	Mohamed Abdul Ghanee	Solo	
2017	Neydhen Vakivaakah	"Ishqu Hithuge Edhenee Yaaraa"	Mohamed Abdul Ghanee	Solo	Appears in Soundtrack album
2017	Bos	"Bos Dheyhaa Loabivey"	Mausoom Shakir	Aishath Maain Rasheed	
2017	Bos	"Loabin Gos Bos Dheyn"	Mausoom Shakir	Solo	
2017	Bos	"Aharenge Hiyy Himeynvaan"	Mohamed Abdul Ghanee	Solo	
2019	Kaaku?	"Maayoos Vefaa"	Mohamed Abdul Ghanee	Solo	
2020	Andhirikan	"Andhirikan"	Mohamed Abdul Ghanee	Mariyam Ashfa	
2022	Hehes	"Veynekey Ishq Mee"		Mariyam Ashfa	
2023	Loabi Vevijje	"Heelumey Hiyy Furey" (Version 2)	Mohamed Abdul Ghanee	Mariyam Ashfa	
2023	Nina	"Azza"	Mohamed Abdul Ghanee	Mariyam Ashfa, Ahmed Ifnaz Firag	
2024	Mee Ishq	"Shaahee Lolugaa" (Promotional song)	Azhan Ibrahim	Mariyam Ashfa	
2024	Saaya	"Thee Hithuge Vindhey"		Mariyam Ashfa	
2024	Kamanaa	"Kathi Kathi Chaalu Balaalun"	Mohamed Abdul Ghanee	Rafiyath Rameeza, Mariyam Ashfa	
2024	Kamanaa	"Saafu Loaiybah Adhaa"	Easa Shareef	Mariyam Ashfa	
2024	Udhabaani 2	"Libenee Sazaa" (Male Version)	Mohamed Abdul Ghanee	Solo	
2025	Sorry	"Mamma"	Mausoom Shakir	Solo	
2025	Sorry	"Rovvaifi"	Mohamed Abdul Ghanee	Solo	
2025	Sorry	"Fun'dufun'du Veemaa (Duet Version)"	Kaneeru Abdul Raheem	Mariyam Ashfa	
2025	Sorry	"Fun'dufun'du Veemaa (Solo Version)"	Kaneeru Abdul Raheem	Solo	Appears in Soundtrack album
2025	Kan'bulo	"Mi Libunu Sazaa Akee"	Mohamed Abdul Ghanee	Rafiyath Rameeza	
2025	Kos Gina Mistake	"Kos Gina Mistake"		Hassan Jalaal	
2025	Kos Gina Mistake	"Kessaa Veynaa Dheefaa" (Version 1)		Mariyam Ashfa	
2025	Lily	"Hiyy Kathiliye"	Mohamed Abdul Ghanee	Mariyam Ashfa	
2026	Dhevi	"Huvafenehgaa"	Mohamed Abdul Ghanee	Ikram Mohamed	
2026	Majunoon	"Dhemeyhen Mibin"	Mohamed Abdul Ghanee	Mariyam Ashfa	
2026	Majunoon	"Maushooq"	Abdulla Shahidh (Teddy)	Aminath Raaya Ashraf	

=== Short film ===
Year	Film	Song	Lyricist(s)	Co-artist(s)
2005	Falhi Sikunthu 1	"Sissaali Dhanvaru"	Ahmed Nashidh (Dharavandhoo)	Aminath Nashidha
2006	Mohamma Kalo V/S Bao Kalo	"Koreh Koreh Dhen"	Adam Haleem Adhnan	Solo
2006	Vasvaas (Film Series)	"Vasvaas" (Theme Song)		Solo
2007	Neena	"Chaaley Thiya Fun Nazaru"		Solo
2007	Ossunu Iraaeku	"Iru Ossumun"		Solo
2007	Fenu Paree	"Fenu Paree Fenilumun"	Mohamed Abdul Ghanee	Solo
2007	Edhonveli Thundi 1	"Thun'dimathi Naamaan"		Solo
2007	Fahu Sofha	"Hairaanvefa Ey"	Mohamed Abdul Ghanee	Solo
2008	No Money Full Beggy	"Kathilee Reethi Nazarekey"		Solo
2008	Umurah Salaam	"Dhulakun Huvaa"	Yoosuf Mohamedfulhu	Solo
2009	Pink Fairy	"Dum Dudum Dum"	Mohamed Abdul Ghanee	Mariyam Ashfa
2009	Pink Fairy	"Naananayo"	Mohamed Abdul Ghanee	Mariyam Ashfa
2009	Pink Fairy	"Mi Dheloa Keiymadhuvefaa"	Mohamed Abdul Ghanee	Solo
2009	Haadhisaa	"Haadhisaa" (Theme Song)	Mohamed Abdul Ghanee	Solo
2009	Dheke Dhekeves 5	"Mihitheh Dheykah Dhen Neydhen"	Adam Haleem Adnan	Solo
2010	Muhammaage Briefcase	"Muhammaage Briefcase" (Theme Song)		Ibrahim Zaid Ali
2011	Siyaasee Vaccine	"Siyaasee Vaccine" (Theme Song)	Ahmed Falah	Ibrahim Zaid Ali
2012	13 Ah Visnaa Dhehaas	"13 Ah Visnaa Dhehaas" (Theme Song)	Ahmed Falah	Ibrahim Zaid Ali
2012	Mammaa Ey	"Mammaa Ey"	Mohamed Abdul Ghanee	Solo
2013	Siyaasee Koalhun	"Siyaasee Koalhun" (Theme Song)	Ahmed Falah	Ibrahim Zaid Ali
2013	Farihibe 4	"Riyaleh Nagan"	Ahmed Falah	Solo

=== Television and web series ===
Year	Title	Song	Lyricist(s)	Co-artist(s)
2006	Hinithun Velaashey Kalaa	"Hinithunvelaashey Kalaa" (Theme Song)		Solo
2007	Kalaa Dheke Varah Loabivey	"Kalaa Dheke Varah Loabivey"	Mohamed Abdul Ghanee	Solo
2007	Vamey Kaireegaa Kalaa	"Vamey Kaireegaa Kalaa"	Mohamed Abdul Ghanee	Mariyam Ashfa
2008	Hammaa Muhammaa	"Hammaa Muhammaa" (Title Song)	Mohamed Abdul Ghanee	Solo
2009	Mohamma Gaadiyaa	"Farudhaa Nagaafa Ey"		Ibrahim Zaid Ali, Niuma Mohamed
2009	Sirru Sirrun Kalaa	"Sirru Sirrun Kalaa"		Solo
2013	Adhives Eloaibah Gadharu Kuran 2	"Karuna Loluga Vee Furifaa"	Mausoom Shakir	Ibrahim Zaid Ali
2019	Nama (Teledrama)	"Kani"		Solo
2020	Huvaa Kohfa Bunan	"Veyneh Yageene Mee Ishq Ishq"		Solo
2022	Yasna	"Jazubaathu"	Aminath Rizny	Aminath Raya Ashraf
2023	Yaaraa	"Aadhey Yaaraa Aadhey"	Mohamed Abdul Ghanee	Various artists
2025	Varah Loabivey	"Varah Loabivey"	Asim Ali	Solo

=== Non-film songs ===
Year	Album/single	Song	Lyricist(s)	Co-artist(s)
1993	Fannaanunge Muzikee Show	"Theyravaa"		Solo
1999	Khiyaal	"Oagaavedhee"	Mohamed Abdul Ghanee	Solo
1999	Khiyaal	"Ivvaa Soanaa Han'dhu"	Abdulla Hameed Fahumee	Solo
2000	Hinithun	"Nulaahiku Noo Fazaaehgaa"	Ismail Abdul Qadhir	Solo
2000	Neyvaa	"Masthu Kuruvaane Haallaa Ulheyney"	Kopee Mohamed Rasheed	Solo
2000	Kathiriyaa	"Bala Ranin"	Adam Naseer Ibrahim	Solo
2001	Aimina	"Vejje Hithah Thadhu"	Mohamed Rasheed (Annaarey)	Aminath Ibrahim
2002	Hithukooru	"Elli Kalhin"	Mohamed Abdul Ghanee	Waves Band
2002	Hithukooru	"Mi Kiyaadhey Haadhisaa"	Mohamed Abdul Ghanee	Waves Band
2002	Hithukooru	"Fanara Vileyrey"	Mohamed Abdul Ghanee	Waves Band
2002	Hithukooru	"Heyfilaa Dhaavaruge Kameh"	Mohamed Abdul Ghanee	Waves Band
2002	Hithukooru	"Leenaa"	Mohamed Abdul Ghanee	Waves Band
2002	Hithukooru	"Pink & Blue"	Mohamed Abdul Ghanee	Waves Band
2002	Hithukooru	"Edhemey Kalaayaa"	Mohamed Abdul Ghanee	Ibrahim Zaid Ali, Waves Band
2002	Hithukooru	"Kan'bulo Beynunveemaa"	Mohamed Abdul Ghanee	Ibrahim Zaid Ali, Waves Band
2002	Hithukooru	"Keehhey Vee Olhuvaalee"	Mohamed Abdul Ghanee	Mohamed Shahuban, Waves Band
2002	Ukulhasthila	"Kasheegaa Mas Huree Viyyaa"		Solo
2002	Fari Hooru	"Hoorehfadha Moonekey"		Waves Band
2002	Fari Hooru	"Saadhaa Dhon Moonaa"		Waves Band
2002	Fari Hooru	"Such A Feeling"		Waves Band
2002	Fari Hooru	"Suni Suni Raatein"		Waves Band
2002	Fari Hooru	"Edhemey Kalaayaa" (Remix Version)	Mohamed Abdul Ghanee	Ibrahim Zaid Ali, Waves Band
2003	Fannaanun	"Ufaaveri Ekuveri Vetteh"		Various Artists
2003	Han'dhaan	"Lailaa O Lailaa"		Sofoora Khaleel, Majeed Ismail
2004	Han'dhuma	"Hanhaarain Hiyy Virenee"		Solo
2004	Ehan'dhaanugai...	"Han'dhu Naaraanama"		Solo
2005	Yaaraa 2	"Vee Reethi Neyngey Neyngey"	Ahmed Nashid (Dharavandhoo)	Aishath Inaya
2005	Ulhe Ulhefa	"Manzil Manzil"	Ahmed Nashid (Dharavandhoo)	Aishath Inaya
2006	Hiyy Dheewaanaa 3	"Dheewaanavey Dheewaanavey"	Shareefa Fakhry	Mariyam Unoosha
2006	Hiyy Dheewaanaa 3	"Nikan Loaiybey"	Mohamed Abdul Ghanee	Sofoora Khaleel
2006	Jism	"Jaaney Thiyaee Magey"	Mohamed Abdul Ghanee	Solo
2006	Yaaraanulaa	"Oagaavey Kalaa"		Solo
2006	Bichaanaa	"Yaaraa Heelaa"	Mohamed Abdul Ghanee	Solo
2006	Bichaanaa	"Heelaashe Heelaashey"	Mohamed Abdul Ghanee	Aminath Nashidha
2006	Dhenves	"Loabeegaa Aniyaa"	Mohamed Abdul Ghanee	Solo
2006	Hiyy Roane	"Farikan E Masthee Balan"	Mohamed Abdul Ghanee	Solo
2006	Hiyy Roane	"Yaaraa Ey Yaaraa Ey"	Mohamed Abdul Ghanee	Mariyam Ashfa
2006	Mihan'dhaanugai...	"Nulibey Kamunne Lazzathu"	Abdulla Hilmee	Solo
2007	Hiyy Kiyaathee	"Vindhaa Hithaa Jaanaa Ey"	Mohamed Abdul Ghanee	Mariyam Ashfa
2007	Hiyy Kiyaathee	"Dhan Dhan Dhanvaru"	Mohamed Abdul Ghanee	Mariyam Ashfa
2007	Hiyy Kiyaathee	"Hiyy Kiyaathee Ey"	Mohamed Abdul Ghanee	Solo
2007	Single	"Zuvaanun"	Maumoon Abdul Gayoom	Ibrahim Zaid Ali
2007	Hiyy Dheebalaa	"Hiyy Dheebalaa"	Mohamed Abdul Ghanee	Solo
2007	Single	"Furaavaru Miee"		Ibrahim Zaid Ali
2007	Thihan'dhaanugai...	"Dhevvanee Mi Jazaa Ey"	Ibrahim Mansoor	Solo
2007	Salaamey	"Ticket To Hollywood"	Ahmed Nashid (Dharavandhoo)	Mariyam Rifqa
2008	Hiyy Dheewaanaa 4	"Hiyy Dheewaanaa"	Mohamed Abdul Ghanee	Sofoora Khaleel
2008	Hiyy Sihenee	"Hiyy Sihenee"	Ahmed Falah	Mariyam Ashfa
2008	Hiyy Sihenee	"Hithuga Veyey Thi Asaru"	Ahmed Falah	Aminath Shaufa Saeed
2008	Hiyy Sihenee	"I Am A Disco Dancer"	Mohamed Abdul Ghanee	Shaheedha Mohamed
2008	Single	"Fehi Raiy Hudhun Nashaalaa"		Mariyam Unoosha
2008	Hiyy Fanaa	"Maushooqaa Maushooqaa"		Solo
2008	Hiyy Fanaa	"Hiyy Ronee Hiyy Ronee"		Solo
2008	Hiyy Fanaa	"Hureeme Thihithun Jaaga Dheythoa"		Solo
2008	Hiyy Fanaa	"Foavey Dheloa Karunaigaa"		Solo
2008	Jaadhuvee Nooru	"Loabi Chaaloovi Thee Ranparee"	Adam Haleem Adnan	Mariyam Ashfa
2008	Jaadhuvee Nooru	"Hey Hutteyhaavey"	Adam Haleem Adnan	Mariyam Ashfa
2008	Jaadhuvee Nooru	"Baiveriyaa O Baiveriyaa"	Adam Haleem Adnan	Mariyam Rifqa
2008	Jaadhuvee Nooru	"Goalhi Goalhi Sirrun Sirrun"	Mohamed Abdul Ghanee	Mariyam Unoosha
2008	Nasheed 2008	"Wathan Edhey Migothah"		Various Artists
2008	Fini Roalhi	"Haas Hithaama" (Bonus Song)		Mukhthar Adam
2008	Thihan'dhaanugai Remix	"Veheyvaareytherein"	Meynaa Hassaan	Solo
2008	Hiyy Dhoovee	"Yaaru Mithuraa"		Solo
2009	Adhives... Loabivey	"Neyngi Hiyy Ishqun"		Solo
2009	Adhives... Loabivey	"Thiya Reethi Lolugaa"		Solo
2009	Adhives... Loabivey	"Thiya Reethi Lolugaa" (Remix Version)		Solo
2009	Adhives... Loabivey	"Thuni Thuni Miee Hitheh"		Solo
2009	Adhives... Loabivey	"Race"		Mariyam Ashfa
2009	Yaaraa 4	"Faathimaa Huttey Alhey"	Ahmed Nashid (Dharavandhoo)	Fathimath Zoona
2009	Yaaraa 4	"Nuveythoa Hiyy Thi Aalaa"	Ahmed Nashid (Dharavandhoo)	Fathimath Zoona
2009	Aavedhaa	"Furi Dhanee Mihithey"	Mohamed Abdul Ghanee	Solo
2009	Fenumun Hiyy Magey	"Hiyy Magey Edhevenee"	Adam Jinaah	Mariyam Ashfa
2009	Hiyy Dheebalaa 2	"Haadhisaa" (Theme Song)	Mohamed Abdul Ghanee	Solo
2009	MDP	"Nanaa Huvafen Dhusheemey"		Solo
2009	Ehan'dhaanugai Duet	"Edheythee Chaandhaneemaa Thoa"	Ibrahim Mansoor	Fathimath Zeenath
2009	Shaahee Kamana	"Thiya Loabivaa Shaahee Ashey"		Shifa Thaufeeq
2009	Vaahan'dhaanakun	"Nuvaanama Ishqu Dhuniyeygaa"		Solo
2009	Vaahan'dhaanakun	"Huri Kanthakaa Dhuruvaashey Darr"		Solo
2009	Vaahan'dhaanakun	"Vaahan'dhaanakun Rovenee" (Group Version)	Mohamed Amir Ahmed	Various Artists
2010	Loabeege Vaguthu	"Loabivey Loabivey"	Ahmed Haleem	Shifa Thaufeeq
2010	Loabeege Vaguthu	"Aashiqaa Ey Magey"	Ahmed Haleem	Shifa Thaufeeq
2010	Loabeege Vaguthu	"Aashiqaa Ey Aadhey"	Ahmed Haleem	Shifa Thaufeeq
2010	Loabeege Vaguthu	"Shakku Kurevumun Loaiybah"	Ahmed Haleem	Shifa Thaufeeq
2010	Loabeege Vaguthu	"Mi Meygavaa Hithuvindhu Maduvaaney"	Ahmed Haleem	Mariyam Ashfa
2010	Loabeege Vaguthu	"Fenifaa Hiyyvaa Haalu Balaalaa"	Ahmed Haleem	Solo
2010	Ehan'dhaanugai Remix	"Gendhey Bunamey"		Khadheeja Mohamed (Rizoo)
2010	Vasmeeru	"Twist"		Solo
2010	Vasmeeru	"Vamey Kaireegaa Kalaa"	Mohamed Abdul Ghanee	Mariyam Ashfa
2010	Vasmeeru	"Zoobi Doobi"		Andhala Haleem
2010	Vaahan'dhaanakun 2	"Lily Of The Dhivelee"		Solo
2010	Vaahan'dhaanakun 2	"Vaahan'dhaanakun Rovenee" (Group Version)	Mohamed Amir Ahmed	Various Artists
2010	Jaadhuvee Thari	"Fathihuge Thari"	Mohamed Abdul Ghanee	Mariyam Rifqa Rasheedh
2010	Jaadhuvee Thari	"Dance Ge Chance"	Adam Haleem Adhnan	Mariyam Rifqa Rasheedh
2010	Jaadhuvee Thari	"Vee Gothehves Neyngey Ahdhey"		Mariyam Rifqa Rasheedh
2010	Jaadhuvee Thari	"Aiy Alhaa Aiy Alhaa"		Mariyam Ashfa
2010	Jaadhuvee Thari	"Maru Dheynee"		Aishath Maain Rasheed
2011	17th SAARC Summit	"Ehbaivanthakan"	Mohamed Abdul Ghanee, Ismail Hameed	Mariyam Unoosha
2011	Single	"Haas Hithaamain"	Mohamed Abdul Ghanee	Rafiyath Rameeza
2011	Hiyy Dheewaanaa 5	"Ishqu Heyleemaa"		Mariyam Unoosha
2011	Hiyy Dheewaanaa 5	"Yaaraa Fenifaa"		Mariyam Ashfa
2011	Dhohokkobe Han'dhaanugai: Raaja Raanee	"Dhaaru Ofu Maaiyvi"		Solo
2011	Dhohokkobe Han'dhaanugai: Raaja Raanee	"Giritee Loabin"	Beyya Huhthu	Solo
2011	Ehan'dhaanugai Retro	"Ummeedhey Foari"		Aishath Shifana
2011	Tharinge Rey 2011	"Vaudhey Vevey Mee"	Kopee Ibrahim Rasheed	Aishath Rishmy
2012	Mee Raajje	"Dhonhiyala"		Solo
2012	Mee Raajje	"Koadi"		Solo
2012	Mee Raajje	"Mee Raajjeyey" (Remake Version)		Liusha Mohamed
2012	Bodu Rey 2012	"Hissuthah Heefilaa"		Solo
2012	Single	"Shaadhee Vaalaa" (Cover Version)		Solo
2012	Palestine Song	"Karunayaa Leyge Thoofaanugaa"		Solo
2012	Edhuvasthah	"Hiyy Thiya Libeythoa"	Ibrahim Shareef	Solo
2012	Edhuvasthah	"Keehvebaa Magey Mihithaa Kulhelee"	Ibrahim Shareef	Solo
2012	Vevenee	"Han'dhey Thiyaee Magey"	Mohamed Abdul Ghanee	Solo
2012	Ehan'dhaanugai 1433	"Rehendhi Vaahaka Vanavaru"	Mohamed Abdul Ghanee	Solo
2012	Ehan'dhaanugai 1433	"Ehan'dhaanuge Asaruthakey"	Mohamed Abdul Ghanee	Various Artists
2012	Hithuge Enme Funminun: S01	"Loabi Maivantha"	Mohamed Abdul Ghanee	Solo
2012	Hithuge Enme Funminun: S01	"Mammaa Ey"	Mohamed Abdul Ghanee	Aminath Lamha Latheef
2012	Tharinge Rey 2012	"Balaashe Dheyshe Dhen"		Fathimath Azifa
2012	Single	"Kaarisaa"		Aishath Maain Rasheed, Ibrahim Zaid Ali
2013	Hiyy Dheebalaa 3	"My Lovely Girl"	Mohamed Abdul Ghanee	Mariyam Ashfa
2013	Hiyy Dheewaanaa 6	"Ninjeh Naadhey Heylaa Hoadhey"		Fathimath Zoona
2013	Jaanaa	"Thee Hooruparee Ey"	Mohamed Abdul Ghanee	Solo
2013	Jaanaa	"Adhaa"	Mohamed Abdul Ghanee	Solo
2013	Jaanaa	"Veyey Reydhuvaa Gaimu Yaaraa"	Mohamed Abdul Ghanee	Solo
2013	Tharinge Rey 2013	"Mooney Thiee Hiyy Edhey"	Mausoom Shakir	Niuma Mohamed
2013	Soul	"Beehi Beehi"	Mohamed Abdul Ghanee	Solo
2014	Hiyy Dheebalaa Collection	"Hiyy Dheebalaa Mix"	Mohamed Abdul Ghanee	Various Artists
2014	Environment Day 2014	"Thimaaveshi"	Zaki	Mariyam Unoosha
2014	Tharinge Rey 2014	"Fenuneemaa Beley"	Mausoom Shakir	Mariyam Ashfa
2014	Vaahan'dhaanakun 3	"Indhiraasve Hayaathun"		Solo
2014	Vaahan'dhaanakun 3	"Vaahan'dhaanakun Rovenee" (Group Version)	Mohamed Amir Ahmed	Various Artists
2015	Gellunu Haaru	"Oagaa Vedheyshey"		Solo
2015	Single	"Reethi Nala Nala Han'dheh"	Abdul Rasheed Hussain	Solo
2015	Ehan'dhaanugai Starz	"Boa Vehey Vaareyaa"	Easa Shareef	Hawwa Ashra
2015	Hithuge Enme Funminun: S03	"Han'gaa Kurun"	Mohamed Abdul Ghanee	Solo
2015	Enme Reethi: S01	"Adu Iveyhe Hithaa"	Mohamed Abdul Ghanee	Aminath Lamha Latheef
2015	Enme Reethi: S01	"Chaaluvee Han'dhaa"		Solo
2015	Enme Reethi: S01	"Ey Loabivaa Malaa"		Solo
2015	Enme Reethi: S01	"Loabeege Mi Aalamugaa"	Ahmed Zahir	Solo
2015	Ran Han'dhaanugai: S01	"Neyngey Gothehvey"	Abdulla Muaz Yoosuf	Mira Mohamed Majid
2015	Tharinge Rey 2015	"Hithugaa Eki Reyrey"		Solo
2015	Minivan 50	"Minivan 50" (Theme Song)	Adam Naseer Ibrahim	Various Artists
2016	Single	"Heeleemaa"	Mohamed Abdul Ghanee	Mariyam Ashfa
2017	Celebrating 20	"Mooney Thiee Hiyy Edhey"	Mausoom Shakir	Niuma Mohamed
2017	Jumhooree 50	"Jumhooree 50" (Theme Song)	Adam Naseer Ibrahim	Various Artists
2017	Qaumee Dhuvahuge Jalsaa	"Mi Dheenaai Qaumiyyathu"		Various Artists
2017	Qaumee Dhuvas 1439: Bahuruva	"Qaumee Nidhaa"	Adam Shareef Umar	Various artists
2017	Qaumee Dhuvas 1439: Bahuruva	"Vaajibeke Mee Hitheygen"	Mohamed Abdul Ghanee	Moosa Samaau
2018	Han'dhakee Thee Hiyy Edhey	"Vaudhey Vanee Hithun"	Mohamed Abdul Ghanee	Mariyam Ashfa
2018	Han'dhakee Thee Hiyy Edhey	"Kalaayahtakaa Edhi"		Solo
2018	Dhivehi Fuluhunge 85th Anniversary	"Dhivehi Fuluhun"	Adam Abdul Rahuman	Various Artists
2018	Dhivehi Fuluhunge 85th Anniversary	"Ey Shaheedhee Zuvaan"		Ibrahim Zaid Ali, Majeed Ismail
2018	Dhivehi Fuluhunge 85th Anniversary	"Thanavas Khidhumaiy"		Various Artists
2018	Saff Champions 2018	"Aharemenge Ummeedhu"		Various Artists
2018	Saff Champions 2018	"Maruhabaa Dhivehi Qaumee Football Team"	Abdulla Afeef	Various Artists
2018	Single	"Udhavee Aligadha Ireh"		Solo
2018	Single	"Vee Haalehga Vaan"		Ibrahim Zaid Ali, Ahmed Ibrahim
2018	Qaumee Dhuvas 1440: Bathalun	"Shaheedh Hussain Adamge Han'dhaanugai"	Adam Shareef Umar	Various Artists
2019	Saudh Hussain 2019	"Hin'gaa Hovamaa Nikan Kerigen"		Solo
2019	Mother's Day 2019	"Kuraa Dhu'aa Mee"	Izza Ahmed Nizar	Solo
2019	Single	"Hoadhaifi Kaamiyaabu"		Mariyam Ashfa, Ibrahim Zaid Ali
2019	Single	"Kiyaa Maruhabaa"	Amir Saleem	Mariyam Ashfa, Shalabee Ibrahim
2019	Han'dhaan Kurahchey	"Ehera Han'dhu Dhenhey"	Easa Shareef	Mariyam Ashfa
2019	Han'dhaan Kurahchey	"Vindhaa Himeyn Vaashey"	Izza Ahmed Nizar	Mariyam Ashfa
2019	Han'dhaan Kurahchey	"Han'dhaan Kurahchey"	Izza Ahmed Nizar	Mariyam Ashfa
2019	Qaumee Dhuvas 1441: Mintheege Hamahamakan	"Qaanoonee Dhaairaa Kurieruvumugaa"		Mariyam Ashfa, Ibrahim Zaid Ali, Amaanee
2019	Qaumee Dhuvas 1441: Mintheege Hamahamakan	"Sihhee Dhaairaa Kurieruvumugaa"	Izza Ahmed Nizar	Rafiyath Rameeza, Hassan Tholaaq
2020	Loabi Nulibunas	"Thoonufili Lolugaavi Jaadhoo"		Solo
2020	Loabi Nulibunas	"Loabi Nulibunas"		Rafiyath Rameeza
2020	Covid-19	"Karunun Mi Dheloa Foaveyey"	Abdul Raheem Abdulla	Solo
2020	Single	"Enmen Ekee"	Mohamed Abdul Ghanee	Ibrahim Zaid Ali
2020	Single	"Amalu Seedhaa Kurey"		Solo
2020	Single	"Ilaahee Mibin" (Cover Version)	Abdul Rasheed Hussain	Various Artists
2020	Nurse Day 2020	"Eku Naruhun"		Nasma Abdul Muhsin
2020	Qaumee Dhuvas 1442	"Mee Magey Dheebey"		Various Artists
2022	Single	"Thiya Soora"	Mohamed Abdul Ghanee	Aishath Juni Jinah
2025	Araairu	"Mee Magey Raajjeyey"	Abdul Raheem Abdulla	Various Artists

=== Religious / Madhaha ===
Year	Album/single	Madhaha	Lyricist(s)	Co-artist(s)
2007	100 Javaahiru 2	"Shakkeh Nethey"	Kopee Mohamed Rasheed	Solo
2008	Ramadan Kareem	"Nafsuthah Thoahiru Kuraashey"		Solo
2008	Faanthari	"Qaburusthaanu"	Abdulla Afeef	Solo
2017	PSM Madhaha Album	"Roadhayah"		Solo
2017	PSM Madhaha Album	"Hamdhu Thaureefu"		Solo
2017	Single	"Maruhabaa Saahibu Al Sa'aadhaa"	Adam Naseer Ibrahim	Various Artists
2020	Single	"Dhu'aage Mih'raabugaa"	Adam Naseer Ibrahim	Various Artists

== Filmography ==
Year	Title	Role	Notes	Ref(s)
2010	Dhin Veynuge Hithaamaigaa	Himself	Special appearance in the song "Annaashey Hinithun Velamaa"	
2010	Veeraana	Himself	Special appearance in the promotional song "Veeraana"	
2023	Yaaraa	Zeyba's friend	Guest role; "Episode 10"	
2023	November	Himself	Special appearance	

== Accolades ==
Year	Award	Category	Nominated work	Result	Ref(s)
2011	2nd SunFM Awards	Most Entertaining Male Vocalist		Nominated	
2014	3rd Maldives Film Awards	Best Original Song	"Neyngey Bunaakah" - Mihashin Furaana Dhandhen	Nominated	
2014	3rd Maldives Film Awards	Best Original Song	"Huvaakohfaa Bunan" - Mihashin Furaana Dhandhen (Shared with Moosa Samau)	Nominated	
2015	6th Gaumee Film Awards	Best Male Playback Singer	"Bunaa Hiyy Vey" - Zalzalaa En'buri Aun	Won	
2015	6th Gaumee Film Awards	Best Male Playback Singer	"Vee Banavefaa" - Veeraana	Nominated	
2015	6th Gaumee Film Awards	Best Lyricist	"Dhoadhi Ran" - Dhin Veynuge Hithaamaigaa	Nominated	
2016	7th Gaumee Film Awards	Best Male Playback Singer	"Loabivaa Ey" - Hiyy Yaara Dheefa	Won	
2016	7th Gaumee Film Awards	Best Male Playback Singer	"Vejjey Fanaa" - Hiyy Yaara Dheefa	Nominated	
2016	7th Gaumee Film Awards	Best Original Song	"Neyngey Bunaakah" - Mihashin Furaana Dhandhen	Nominated	
2016	7th Gaumee Film Awards	Best Lyricist	"Huvaakohfaa Bunan" - Mihashin Furaana Dhandhen	Won	
2016	7th Gaumee Film Awards	Best Lyricist	"Nethifanaa" - Loodhifa	Nominated	
2016	7th Gaumee Film Awards	Best Lyricist	"Alathu Loabi" - Love Story	Nominated	
2017	National Award of Recognition	Performing Arts - Singing		Won	
2017	8th Gaumee Film Awards	Best Male Playback Singer	"Ummeedh" - Vafaatheri Kehiveriya	Nominated	
2017	8th Gaumee Film Awards	Best Lyricist	"Aadheys" - Aadheys	Nominated	
2017	8th Gaumee Film Awards	Best Lyricist	"Gandhee Huvaa" - Ahsham	Nominated	
2019	9th Gaumee Film Awards	Best Male Playback Singer	"Aharenge Hiyy Himeynvaan" - Bos	Nominated	
2019	9th Gaumee Film Awards	Best Original Song	"Vishka" - Vishka (Shared with Ismail Adheel)	Nominated	
2019	9th Gaumee Film Awards	Best Lyricist	"Dhu'aa" - Hahdhu	Nominated	
2025	1st MSPA Film Awards	Best Lyrics	"Aa Ummeedhu" – Nina	Won	
2025	1st MSPA Film Awards	Best Lyrics	"Raalheh Hen" – Goh Raalhu	Nominated	
