= Wathan =

Wathan is a surname. Notable people with the surname include:

- Dusty Wathan (born 1973), American baseball player and manager
- John Wathan (born 1949), American baseball player and manager

== See also ==
- Nathan (surname)
