= Mohamed Abdulla (actor) =

Maldivian actor, producer, politician

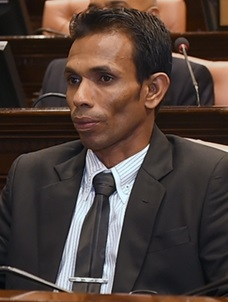
- Abdulla at Parliament opening ceremony, 2015
- Born: 6 December 1974 (age 51); Ihavandhoo, Haa Alif Atoll, Maldives
- Occupations: Producer, actor, politician
- Years active: 1999–present
- Political party: Maldivian Democratic Party
- Other political affiliations: Jumhooree Party; Progressive Party of Maldives

Member of the People's Majlis
- In office 27 May 2014 – 27 May 2019
- Succeeded by: Mohamed Shifau
- Constituency: Ihavandhoo

Mohamed Abdulla (born 6 December 1974) is a Maldivian film producer, actor and a politician.

== Career ==
=== Acting career ===
In his career, Abdulla starred in a limited feature films; Bulbulaa (1999) and Amjad Ibrahim's comedy drama film Majubooru Loabi (2000). The latter being a commercial success, marks the only collaboration of Abdulla with legendary comedy actors, Haajara Abdul Kareem and Sithi Fulhu.

Abdulla made his career breakthrough with the role Muhamma in the first installment of Dheke Dhekeves (2004) short film series which extended until the sixth installment, released in 2012. The success of the character Muhamma retained with several other projects including the short film series, Falhi Sikunthu and the television series, Mohamma Gaadiyaa. Other successful short film series of Abdulla includes the short film series, Haa Shaviyani Rasgefaanu and Farihibe. Apart from starring in these films, Abdulla served as the producer from his production company, Dhekedheke Ves Productions.

In 2008, he released the period short film Faqeeru Koe starring opposite Sheela Najeeb which was considered as one of the "best critically acclaimed short film" made in local cinema. At the 1st Maldives Film Awards ceremony, he was bestowed with the Best Actor award in the short films category. He received the second award from the same category in the 3rd Maldives Film Awards ceremony, for the titular role in the fourth installment of the Farihibe series.

From 2011, the theme of his comedy films expanded into political drama genre where short films Siyaasee Vaccine (2011), 13 Ah Visnaa Dhehaas (2012) and Siyaasee Koalhun (2012), all starring opposite Ismail Rasheed were released to positive response from critics and audience. The latter two fetched him further two nominations in the Best Actor - Short film category.

=== Political career ===
Abdulla contested in the 2014 Maldivian parliamentary election and was elected as the Member of Parliament for Ihavandhoo constituency on a Jumhooree Party ticket as part of the former ruling coalition. However, citing a pledge to work with the government to deliver infrastructure projects, he signed for the Progressive Party of Maldives shortly after the elections. In July 2017, Abdulla left the party after backing the opposition's bid to impeach the former speaker. Shortly after, the Supreme Court announced that he has lost his seat over an anti-defection ruling. After more than a year out of parliament, in October 2018, he was reinstated as the Member of Parliament. In November 2018, he signed for the Maldivian Democratic Party but fails to contest to back his seat as the parliament member for Ihavandhoo constituency through the party's primary and individually.

== Media image ==
In 2011, Abdulla was voted as the "Most Entertaining Actor" in the SunFM Awards 2010, an award night ceremony initiated by Sun Media Group to honour the most recognized personalities in different fields, during the previous year, while defending the award in the next year.

== Filmography ==
=== Feature film ===
| Year | Title | Role | Notes | Ref(s) |
|---|---|---|---|---|
| 1999 | Bulbulaa | | | |
| 2000 | Ajaaib | | | |
| 2000 | Majubooru Loabi | Giritee | | |
| 2010 | Dhin Veynuge Hithaamaigaa | Himself | Special appearance in the song "Annaashey Hinithun Velamaa" | |

=== Short film ===
| Year | Title | Role | Notes |
|---|---|---|---|
| 2004 | Dheke Dhekeves 1 | Muhamma | |
| 2004 | Falhi Sikunthu 1 | Muhamma | |
| 2005 | Dheke Dhekeves 2 | Muhamma | |
| 2005 | Falhi Sikunthu 2 | Muhamma | |
| 2006 | Mohamma Kalo V/S Bao Kalo | MK | |
| 2006 | Dheke Dhekeves 3 | Muhamma | |
| 2006 | Salhibe | Muhamma Kaloa | Special appearance |
| 2006 | Dheke Dhekeves 4 | Muhamma | |
| 2006 | Haa Shaviyani Rasgefaanu 1 | Haa Shaviyani Rasgefaanu | |
| 2006 | Haa Shaviyani Rasgefaanu 2 | Haa Shaviyani Rasgefaanu | |
| 2007 | Bunyey Bunyey | Dhon Aadhanu | |
| 2007 | Farihibe 1 | Farihibe | |
| 2007 | Haa Shaviyani Rasgefaanu 3 | Haa Shaviyani Rasgefaanu | |
| 2007 | Haa Shaviyani Rasgefaanu 4 | Haa Shaviyani Rasgefaanu | |
| 2007 | Haa Shaviyani Rasgefaanu 5 | Haa Shaviyani Rasgefaanu | |
| 2008 | Vathukiba | Hazaaru | |
| 2008 | Farihibe 2 | Farihibe | |
| 2008 | Faqeeru Koe | Kaasimfulhu | |
| 2009 | Dheke Dhekeves 5 | Muhamma | |
| 2010 | Loabeege Ninja | Ninja | |
| 2010 | Muhammaage Briefcase | Muhamma | |
| 2011 | Farihibe 3 | Farihibe | |
| 2011 | Siyaasee Vaccine | Waseem | |
| 2012 | Dheke Dhekeves 6 | Muhamma | |
| 2012 | 13 Ah Visnaa Dhehaas | Hussainfulhu | |
| 2013 | Siyaasee Koalhun | | |
| 2013 | Farihibe 4 | Farihibe | |

=== Television ===
| Year | Title | Role | Notes |
|---|---|---|---|
| 2000 | Reysham | Himself | Special appearance in the song medley; Episode 09 |
| 2004 | Dhanmaanu | Muhamma | |
| 2008 | Hammaa Mohammaa | Muhamma | |
| 2009 | Mohamma Gaadiyaa | Muhamma | |
| 2010 | Mohamma Gaadiyaa 2 | Muhamma | |

=== Other work ===
| Year | Title | Producer | Writer | Notes |
|---|---|---|---|---|
| 2004 | Dheke Dhekeves 1 | Yes | Yes | Short film |
| 2004 | Falhi Sikunthu 1 | Yes | | Short film |
| 2004 | Edhathuru | Yes | | Feature film |
| 2005 | Dheke Dhekeves 2 | Yes | Yes | Short film; co-written with Ravee Farooq |
| 2005 | Falhi Sikunthu 2 | Yes | | Short film |
| 2006 | Mohamma Kalo V/S Bao Kalo | Yes | | Short film |
| 2006 | Dheke Dhekeves 3 | Yes | | Short film |
| 2006 | Hithuge Edhun | Yes | | Feature film |
| 2006 | Hiyani | Yes | | Feature film |
| 2006 | Dheke Dhekeves 4 | Yes | | Short film |
| 2006 | Haa Shaviyani Rasgefaanu 1 | Yes | | Short film |
| 2006 | Haa Shaviyani Rasgefaanu 2 | Yes | | Short film |
| 2007 | Bunyey Bunyey | Yes | | Short film |
| 2007 | Hiyy Ekaniveemaa | Yes | | Short film |
| 2007 | Farihibe 1 | Yes | | Short film |
| 2007 | Haa Shaviyani Rasgefaanu 3 | Yes | | Short film |
| 2007 | Haa Shaviyani Rasgefaanu 4 | Yes | | Short film |
| 2007 | Haa Shaviyani Rasgefaanu 5 | Yes | | Short film |
| 2007 | Handi Kujjaa | Yes | | Short film |
| 2008 | Vathukiba | Yes | | Short film |
| 2008 | Farihibe 2 | Yes | | Short film |
| 2008 | Hammaa Mohammaa | Yes | | Drama series; 5 episodes |
| 2008 | Faqeeru Koe | Yes | | Short film |
| 2009 | Hiyy Rohvaanulaa | Yes | | Feature film |
| 2009 | Mohamma Gaadiyaa | Yes | | Drama series; 5 episodes |
| 2009 | Dheke Dhekeves 5 | Yes | | Short film |
| 2010 | Loabeege Ninja | Yes | | Short film |
| 2010 | Muhammaage Briefcase | Yes | | Short film |
| 2010 | Veeraana | Yes | | Feature film; co-produced with Fathimath Nahula |
| 2010 | Mohamma Gaadiyaa 2 | Yes | | Drama series; 5 episodes |
| 2010 | Niuma | Yes | | Feature film |
| 2011 | Farihibe 3 | Yes | | Short film |
| 2011 | Siyaasee Vaccine | Yes | | Short film |
| 2012 | Dheke Dhekeves 6 | Yes | | Short film |
| 2012 | 13 Ah Visnaa Dhehaas | Yes | | Short film |
| 2013 | Siyaasee Koalhun | Yes | | Short film |
| 2013 | Farihibe 4 | Yes | | Short film |
| 2016 | Vafaatheri Kehiveriya | Yes | | Feature film |
| 2022–2023 | Lafuzu | Yes | | Web series; 30 episodes |
| 2024 | Ereahfahu | Yes | | Web series; 15 episodes |
| 2025 | Ilzaam | Yes | | Feature film |

== Accolades ==
| Year | Award | Category | Nominated work | Result | Ref(s) |
|---|---|---|---|---|---|
| 2011 | 1st Maldives Film Awards | Best Actor - Short Film | Faqeeru Koe | Won | |
| 2011 | 2nd SunFM Awards | Most Entertaining Actor | | Won | |
| 2014 | 3rd Maldives Film Awards | Best Actor - Short Film | Farihibe 4 | Won | |
| 2014 | 3rd Maldives Film Awards | Best Actor - Short Film | Siyaasee Koalhun | Nominated | |
| 2014 | 3rd Maldives Film Awards | Best Actor - Short Film | 13 Ah Visnaa Dhehaas | Nominated | |
| 2015 | 6th Gaumee Film Awards | Best Costume Design | Hiyy Rohvaanulaa (shared with Niuma Mohamed) | Nominated | |
| 2017 | 8th Gaumee Film Awards | Best Actor - Short Film | Farihibe 4 | Nominated | |
