= Dhaandhoo =

- Inhabited island
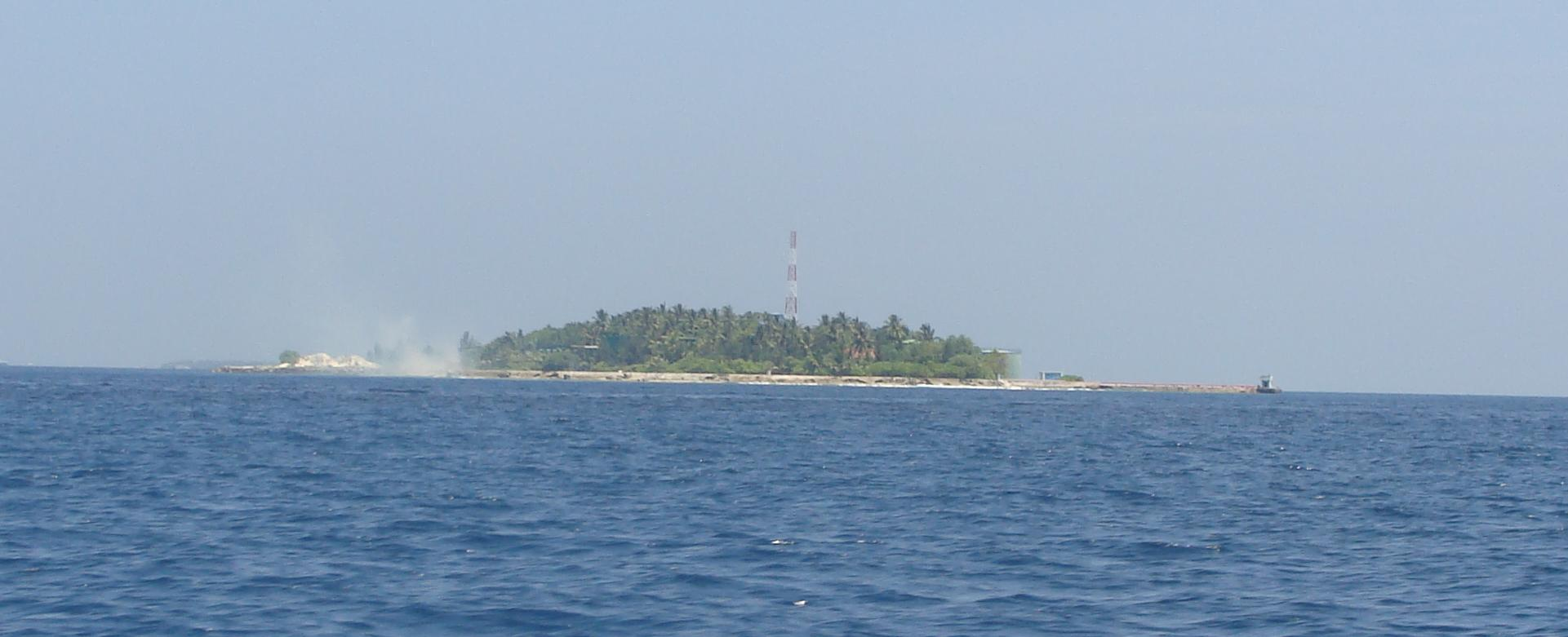

- Location in Maldives
- Coordinates: 00°37′11″N 73°27′50″E
- Country: Maldives
- Administrative atoll: Gaafu Alif Atoll
- Distance to Malé: 393.19 km (244.32 mi)

Dimensions
  - Length: 0.750 km (0.466 mi)
  - Width: 0.130 km (0.081 mi)

Population (2014)
  - Total: 1,077 (including foreigners)
- Time zone: UTC+05:00 (MST)

Dhaandhoo (Dhivehi: ދާންދޫ) is one of the inhabited islands of Gaafu Alif Atoll in the Maldives.

== Geography ==
The island is 393.19 km (244 mi; 212 nmi) south of the country's capital, Malé.

== Demography ==
Historical population
Year	Pop.	±%
2006	1,113	—
2014	1,044	−6.2%
2006-2014: Census populations Source:
