= Hassan Ilham =

Maldivian singer

- Occupation: Playback singer
- Years active: 2000–present
- Musical career
- Genres: Pop; filmi; electronic
- Instrument: Vocals

Hassan Ilham is a Maldivian singer.

== Career ==
Ilham made his career debut in the late 1990s though his professional career is noted to be initiated in the year 2000 with the studio album Hamaroalhi where he rendered ten songs for it. The following year, he released the song "Yaaraage Moonu Ma Dhusheemey" from the album Mendhan and "Rey Nidheegaa E Fenunu HUvafeneh" from the album Huvafen, which were marked as his breakthrough performances in his career. The song being a chartbuster leads him to be a prominent voice in the industry where several music directors and producers roped him to lend his voice for several upcoming film releases and studio albums.

In 2010, Ilham appeared as a vocal coach in the local singing reality show Voice of Maldives for its two seasons. Though all his participants get eliminated early in the competition in its first season, the following season was a fruitful challenge for him, where the title was awarded to one of his participants. Afterwards, he slowly disappeared from the music scene though he collaborates few film releases including Naughty 40 (2017) and Kos Gina Mistake (2021). At the 2nd Maldives Film Awards ceremony, Ilham was bestowed with the Best Male Playback Singer award for his soulful and emotional rendition of the song "Kalaa Beevumun" from the film Dhin Veynuge Hithaamaigaa (2010). Nominations for the major categories were announced on 25 June 2012. In 2018, Ilham was ranked third in the list of the "Most Desired Comeback Voices", compiled by Dho?.

== Discography ==
=== Feature film ===
| Year | Film | Song | Lyricist(s) | Co-artist(s) | Notes |
|---|---|---|---|---|---|
| 2001 | Naaummeedhu | "Fennaathee Huvafenugaa" (Bonus Song) | | Solo | Appears in Soundtrack album |
| 2001 | Hiyy Heyokuraathi | "Annaaneythoaey" (Bonus Song) | Ahmed Haleem | Solo | Appears in Soundtrack album |
| 2002 | Loabi Nuvevununama | "Loabin Magey Hiyy" | Mausoom Shakir | Fathimath Rauf | |
| 2002 | Sandhuravirey | "Inthihaavee Khiyaal Thakehgaa" | Ahmed Haleem | Shifa Thaufeeq | Appears in Soundtrack album |
| 2002 | Sandhuravirey | "Kuri Ishquge Mee Thaareefu" | Adam Haleem Adnan | Shifa Thaufeeq | Appears in Soundtrack album |
| 2002 | Sandhuravirey | "Kuri Lhazuvaanaa" | Adam Naseer Ibrahim | | Appears in Soundtrack album |
| 2002 | Kahvalhah Dhaandhen | "Loabivaa Mee Hithey" | Ahmed Sharumeel | Solo | |
| 2003 | Kalaayaanulaa | "Mivaa Gotheh Neyngeyey" | Mausoom Shakir | Fathimath Zoona | |
| 2003 | Kalaayaanulaa | "Loabin Thiya Athuga" | Mausoom Shakir | Shifa Thaufeeq | |
| 2003 | Edhi Edhi Hoadheemey | "Hithu Therey Mi Loabi Fevunas" | Kopee Mohamed Rasheed | Fazeela Amir | |
| 2003 | Edhi Edhi Hoadheemey | "Edhi Edhi Hoadheemey" (Version 2) | Shifa Thaufeeq | Appears in Soundtrack album | |
| 2004 | Edhathuru | "Behidhaaneyey Loabeegaa Oyaa" | Kaneeru Abdul Raheem | Shifa Thaufeeq | |
| 2005 | Handhu Keytha | "Libeythee Ufaa Migothah" | | Shifa Thaufeeq | |
| 2005 | Zuleykha | "Heevey Ladhugannahen" | Mausoom Shakir | Fathimath Rauf | |
| 2006 | Vaaloabi Engeynama | "Vaaloabi En'geynama" (Male Slow Version) | Mohamed Abdul Ghanee | Solo | |
| 2008 | Yoosuf | "Ushaa" | Adam Haleem Adnan | Shifa Thaufeeq | |
| 2009 | Udhabaani | "Udhabaanilaa" | | Aminath Shaufa Saeed | |
| 2009 | Loaiybahtakaa | "Ufalugaa Yaaru Thiya" | Adam Haleem Adnan | Mumthaz Moosa | |
| 2009 | Loaiybahtakaa | "Abadhuves Feneyey Kalaa" | Ahmed Nashid | Shifa Thaufeeq | |
| 2010 | Jinni | "Leygavey Finiveehey Mey" | | Solo | |
| 2010 | Jinni | "Loabiveema Hiyvaa Masthee" | Ahmed Haleem | Solo | Appears in Soundtrack album |
| 2010 | Dhin Veynuge Hithaamaigaa | "Kalaa Beevumun Dhen" | Amir Saleem | Solo | |
| 2010 | Heyonuvaane | "Dhekefeemey Beevi Manzaru" | Boi Ahmed Khaleel | Fathimath Zoona | |
| 2011 | Hiyy Vindhaa Nulaa | "Vaudhaa Huvaa Mee Kuraa" | Shifa Thaufeeq | Shifa Thaufeeq | |
| 2011 | Hiyy Vindhaa Nulaa | "Vaudhaa Huvaa Mee Kuraa" (Sad Version) | Shifa Thaufeeq | Shifa Thaufeeq | |
| 2011 | Hiyy Vindhaa Nulaa | "Moosun Nalae Reehchey Kalaa" | Shifa Thaufeeq | Shifa Thaufeeq | |
| 2011 | Hiyy Vindhaa Nulaa | "Meehe Ebunaa Loaiybakee" | Shifa Thaufeeq | Shifa Thaufeeq | |
| 2011 | Hiyy Vindhaa Nulaa | "Dharifulhaa Nidhaalaashey" (Male Version) | Shifa Thaufeeq | Solo | |
| 2011 | Hafaraaiy | "Kuran Gandhee Huvaa" | Easa Shareef | Shifa Thaufeeq | |
| 2011 | Hithey Dheymee | "Oagaave Bunamey" | Ahmed Nashid | Rafiyath Rameeza | Appears in Soundtrack album |
| 2011 | Zaharu | "Lah La La Laa" | Ismail Mubarik | Shifa Thaufeeq, Aminath Sidhana | |
| 2011 | E Bappa | "Haaufaavey Zamaaney" | | Aishath Maain Rasheed | |
| 2011 | E Bappa | "Kaaku Alhaalee" | | Solo | Appears in Soundtrack album |
| 2011 | 14 Vileyrey | "Loabin Nuhanu Loabin" | Mohamed Abdul Ghanee | Solo | |
| 2011 | 14 Vileyrey | "Dhey Asaru Vaathee Loabeegaa" | Ismail Mubarik | Shifa Thaufeeq | |
| 2011 | Laelaa | "Neydhemey Badhunaamakun" | Ahmed Nashid | Solo | |
| 2014 | Aniyaa | "Hiyy Meygaa Mi Bunaneebaaey" | Ismail Mubarik | Shifa Thaufeeq | |
| 2014 | Raanee | "Oagaave Bunamey" | Ahmed Nashid | Rafiyath Rameeza | |
| 2016 | E Re'ah Fahu | "Mi Dhulun Thiya Faraathah" | | Rafiyath Rameeza | |
| 2016 | E Re'ah Fahu | "Karunain Mi Themi" | | Solo | |
| 2017 | Naughty 40 | "Kamanaa Reethikamunney" | Ahmed Haleem | Solo | |
| 2017 | Naughty 40 | "Nala Nala Insaanaa" | Adam Haleem Adnan | Shifa Thaufeeq | |
| 2024 | Udhabaani 2 | "Keiynuvaavaru Loabin Magey Hiyy" | Ismail Mubarik | Fathimath Rauf | |
| 2025 | Koss Gina Mistake | "Fari Kan'bulo" | | Shifa Thaufeeq | |

=== Short film ===
| Year | Film | Song | Lyricist(s) | Co-artist(s) | Notes |
|---|---|---|---|---|---|
| 2005 | Dheke Dhekeves 2 | "Kuranvee Dance" | Adam Naseer Ibrahim | Moonisa Khaleel | |
| 2007 | Handi Ganduvaru Dhonkamana | "Kamanaaey Nikan Bunaashey" | | Solo | |
| 2007 | Farihibe 2 | "Kalhirava Thooney Nooney" | Ahmed Falah | Solo | |
| 2007 | Magey Dharifulhu | "Hithuga Magey" | Ahmed Haleem | Fathimath Zoona | |
| 2008 | Farihibe 2 | "Farihi Set" | Ahmed Falah | Mumthaz Moosa, Ahmed Falah, Mohamed Farhad | |
| 2009 | Dheke Dhekeves 5 | "Laki Laki Jehenee Hithey" | Mohamed Abdul Ghanee | Aminath Shaufa Saeed | |

=== Television ===
| Year | Title | Song | Lyricist(s) | Co-artist(s) | Notes |
|---|---|---|---|---|---|
| 2003 | Dheewanaa Hiyy | "Thiya Khiyaalu Aalaavaneeyey" | Easa Shareef | Fathimath Rauf | |
| 2005 | Fukkashi | "Ishqee Aawaaraakan" | Adam Haleem Adnan | Solo | |
| 2005 | Kalaage Haqqugaa | "Mooney Mooney" (Male Version) | Ahmed Shakeeb | Solo | |
| 2010 | Magey Hithakee Hitheh Noon Hey? | "Hiyy Masthuvee" | | Moonisa Khaleel | |

=== Non-film songs ===
| Year | Album/single | Song | Lyricist(s) | Co-artist(s) |
|---|---|---|---|---|
| 2000 | Hamaroalhi | "Ishqee Aawaaraakan" | Adam Haleem Adnan | Solo |
| 2000 | Hamaroalhi | "Veeye Loafan Alhaa" | Kopee Mohamed Rasheed | Solo |
| 2000 | Hamaroalhi | "Thedhuverivaa Kaaku Huree" | Kopee Mohamed Rasheed | Solo |
| 2000 | Hamaroalhi | "Haaviyaa Vee Hayaathey" | Kopee Mohamed Rasheed | Solo |
| 2000 | Hamaroalhi | "Ey Malaa Fenumun Kalaa" | Kopee Mohamed Rasheed | Solo |
| 2000 | Hamaroalhi | "Eku Ulhefaa Magey Yaaru" | Kopee Mohamed Rasheed | Solo |
| 2000 | Hamaroalhi | "Ishqee Loabeegaa Jehijjey" | Kopee Mohamed Rasheed | Solo |
| 2000 | Hamaroalhi | "Hiyy Oyaa Behenee Dhekeyshey" | Kopee Mohamed Rasheed | Solo |
| 2000 | Hamaroalhi | "Basnaahaa Hiyy Meygaa Thelhenee Ey" | Kopee Mohamed Rasheed | Solo |
| 2000 | Hamaroalhi | "Leykarunaey Neeraalanee" | Kopee Mohamed Rasheed | Fathimath Rauf |
| 2000 | Koadi | "Haalu Magey Dhekilaa" | | Solo |
| 2000 | Theyonaashi | "Mi Loabeegaa Ageh Nethumun" | | Solo |
| 2001 | Dhunthari | "Reyga Kalaa Beachun Ma Dhusheemey" | Ahmed Nashidh (Dharavandhoo) | Solo |
| 2001 | Dhunthari | "Loabin Veemaa Gayaa" | Ahmed Nashidh (Dharavandhoo) | Solo |
| 2001 | Dhunthari | "Nunidheyney Heekaruvaathee" | Ahmed Nashidh (Dharavandhoo) | Solo |
| 2001 | Dhunthari | "Heeleemaa Goyyey" | Ahmed Nashidh (Dharavandhoo) | Solo |
| 2001 | Dhunthari | "Malakaa Han'dhaanun" | Ahmed Nashidh (Dharavandhoo) | Shaheedha Mohamed |
| 2001 | Fattaru | "Nudhaashey Thihen Yaaraa Rulhin" | Ismail Shakeeb | Fathimath Rauf |
| 2001 | Hithuge Loabi | "Loaiybakun Mee Kuraa" | | Solo |
| 2001 | Huvafen | "Rey Nidheegaa E Fenunu Huvafeneh" | Adam Naseer Ibrahim | Solo |
| 2001 | Kalaa | "Loabeegaa Mihiyy Roathee" | | Solo |
| 2001 | Mendhan | "Yaaraage Moonu Ma Dhusheemey" | Ahmed Shakeeb | Solo |
| 2001 | Mendhan | "Rihun Meyga Ufedheythee" | Ahmed Shakeeb | Solo |
| 2001 | Nayaa | "Kalaayah Faalhukoh Mi Dhenee" | | Solo |
| 2001 | Nayaa | "Ey Han'dhaa Mithuraa Magey" | | Solo |
| 2001 | Nayaa | "Ey Han'dhaa Mithuraa Magey" (Remix Version) | | Solo |
| 2001 | Ranfaunu | "Loabivaa Mee Hithey" | Ahmed Sharumeel | Solo |
| 2001 | Ranfaunu | "Rashah Dhaahithun Nunidhey" | | Fazeela Amir |
| 2001 | Rukkuri 3 | "Dheki Feni Rakivegen" | Ahmed Nashidh (Dharavandhoo) | Aishath Inaya |
| 2001 | Rukkuri 3 | "Karunaige Agu Netheemaa" | Easa Shareef | Shifa Thaufeeq |
| 2001 | Rukkuri 3 | "Mee Keehve Vaa Kamehhey" (Sagiko Ad) | | Solo |
| 2001 | Rukkuri 3 | "Meeru Buimeh Boalaanenyaa" (Sagiko Ad) | | Solo |
| 2002 | Dhanvaru | "Nulame Thiya Loabi Oyaa" | Ahmed Nashidh (Dharavandhoo) | Fathimath Rauf |
| 2002 | Dhonmanje | "Dhonkamanaa Loabin" | | Solo |
| 2002 | E' Kamanaa | "Magumagugaa" | Ismail Mubarik | Shaheedha Riffath |
| 2002 | E' Kamanaa | "Thi Dhey Aniyaa Dhuniyeyn" | Ismail Mubarik | Solo |
| 2002 | E' Kamanaa | "Eyru Dhin Fari Loabi" | Ismail Mubarik | Solo |
| 2002 | Hithakah | "Nudhaashey Thiya Aniyaa Dheefaa" | | Solo |
| 2002 | Jazbaath | "Aniyaage Athun" | Adam Naseer Ibrahim | Solo |
| 2002 | Khanjaru | "Dhon Kaiydhaa" | Ahmed Nashidh (Dharavandhoo) | Solo |
| 2002 | Khanjaru | "Aadhey Aadhey Loabi Midhuniyeyn" | Ahmed Nashidh (Dharavandhoo) | Shifa Thaufeeq |
| 2002 | Khanjaru | "Dhereyaku Thibemaahey" | Adam Naseer Ibrahim | Shifa Thaufeeq |
| 2002 | Khanjaru | "Kathi Nazaraa" | Adam Naseer Ibrahim | Solo |
| 2002 | Khanjaru | "Hithi E Han'dhaan" | Adam Haleem Adhnan | Solo |
| 2002 | Lily | "Moonaa Vidhaa Han'dhey" | | Solo |
| 2002 | Lily | "Hithi Aniyaa Ey Kuri Shikuvaa Ey" | | Solo |
| 2002 | Loabi | "Dhaashey Vayaa Ey" | Boi Ahmed Khaleel | Solo |
| 2002 | Loabi | "Vey Gayaa Vey Gayaa" | Boi Ahmed Khaleel | Solo |
| 2002 | Loabi | "Hithugaa Zakhamuthah Hedhijjey" | Boi Ahmed Khaleel | Shifa Thaufeeq |
| 2002 | Naash | "Haadha Reehchey Kamanaa Ey" | Ahmed Nashidh (Dharavandhoo) | Solo |
| 2002 | Naash | "Naaree Naarey" | Ahmed Nashidh (Dharavandhoo) | Mariyam Unoosha |
| 2002 | Nazaru | "Haadhahaa Ufaaveyey" | | Solo |
| 2002 | Oivaru | "Kiyaadhemey Mi Kuraa Asaru" | | Solo |
| 2002 | Oivaru | "Loabeege Raahathu" | | Solo |
| 2002 | Nazaru | "Sajunaa" | | Solo |
| 2002 | Raasthaa | "Libenee Sazaa Midhuniyeyn" | | Solo |
| 2002 | Raasthaa | "Maathah Farivaneeyey" | | Ali Rameez |
| 2002 | Raasthaa | "Hurihaa Kathun" | | Ali Rameez, Mariyam Unoosha, Mukhthar Adam |
| 2002 | Raiyvilaa | "Furaana Dheyn" | | Solo |
| 2002 | Ran Han'dhu | "Veevare Nubalai" | | Solo |
| 2002 | Ran Han'dhu | "Nala Nala Thiya Chaalu" | | Solo |
| 2002 | Rasmaa | "Libeythee Ufaa Migothah" | | Shifa Thaufeeq |
| 2002 | Rasmaa | "Thunivefaa Dhonkan Huri Lhazuvaanaa" | | Solo |
| 2002 | Rasmaa | "Roalanhey Aashiqaa Ey" | Ahmed Nashidh (Dharavandhoo) | Solo |
| 2002 | Rasmaa | "Madukohbalaa Loabivaanan Bunefiyyaa" | | Solo |
| 2002 | Reethi Abadhuves Reethi | "Dhaaim Vedhaa Fadha Loaiybakah" | | Solo |
| 2002 | Reethi Abadhuves Reethi | "Magey Hithuge Kekulhun" | | Solo |
| 2002 | Reethi Abadhuves Reethi | "Yaaraa Kureehe Loa Thi Bandh" | | Shaheedha Mohamed |
| 2002 | San'dhuravirey | "Kuri Ishquge Mee Thaareefu Dhulun" | Adam Haleem Adhnan | Shifa Thaufeeq |
| 2002 | San'dhuravirey | "Inthihaavee Khiyaal Thakehgaa" | | Shifa Thaufeeq |
| 2002 | San'dhuravirey | "Kuri Lhazuvaanaa Loaiybah Aavaaneyey" | Adam Naseer Ibrahim | Solo |
| 2002 | Single | "Kalaa Thee Magey Hiyy Edhey" | | Solo |
| 2002 | Thun'di | "Hevifaa Kan'bulo Dhiyaimaa" | | Solo |
| 2002 | Ukulhasthila | "Hin'gaa Keyolhaa Dhamaa" | | Solo |
| 2002 | Ukulhasthila | "Ai Foari Ufaathakun" | | Solo |
| 2002 | Ukulhasthila | "Jamaa'athah Faidhaavaa" | | Solo |
| 2002 | Ukulhasthila | "Indhaa Indhaa Fendhee" | | Solo |
| 2002 | Ukulhasthila | "Nanun Beyney Varah" | | Solo |
| 2002 | Vadhaau | "Badhal Nuvaanamey" | Ismail Mubarik | Solo |
| 2002 | Vaudhu | "Mihiyy Eba Thelhey" | | Solo |
| 2003 | Billoori | "Bahdhal Vevey Goiy Veemaa" | | Shifa Thaufeeq |
| 2003 | Himeyn Dhanvaru | "Hithuga Magey" | Ahmed Haleem | Fathimath Zoona |
| 2003 | Himeyn Dhanvaru | "Eyru Zindhagee Hibain Dhin" | Ahmed Nashidh (Dharavandhoo) | Solo |
| 2003 | Hiyy Roavarun | "Kuran Gandhee Huvaa" | Easa Shareef | Shifa Thaufeeq |
| 2003 | Hiyy Roavarun | Thi Dheloa Fenifaa Jaadhuvee" | Adam Haleem Adhnan | Shifa Thaufeeq |
| 2003 | Jaadhoo | "Fanaave Midhanee" | | Solo |
| 2003 | Jaadhoo | "Han'dhuma Aave Aavefaa" | Ahmed Nashidh (Dharavandhoo) | Solo |
| 2003 | Jaadhoo | "Hiyy Firumaafa Nudhaashey" | Ahmed Nashidh (Dharavandhoo) | Aishath Inaya |
| 2003 | Kinaaree | "Barubaadhey Loabi Yaaraa" | | Solo |
| 2003 | Kinaaree | "Loabivun Yaaru Buney" | Adam Haleem Adhnan | Shifa Thaufeeq |
| 2003 | Kinaaree | "Kudhi Kudhi Himanaaru Thakehgaa" | Ahmed Nashidh (Dharavandhoo) | Shifa Thaufeeq |
| 2003 | Kinaaree | "Dhon Aimina" | Ahmed Nashidh (Dharavandhoo) | Aishath Inaya |
| 2003 | Laal Heeraa | "Disco Lavaset" | | Shifa Thaufeeq, Abdul Baaree, Mukhthar Adam |
| 2003 | Laal Heeraa | "Dhariyakah Bappage Naseyhaiy" | | Solo |
| 2003 | Loabi Loabin | "Bala Reethi Nayaa Fari Muniyaa Ey" | Ahmed Saleem | Solo |
| 2003 | Loabi Loabin | "Vindhugaa Hithuge Mivanee Kalaa" | Ahmed Saleem | Fathimath Rauf |
| 2003 | Manzil | "Manzil Thiyey Mihiyy Edhey" | | Solo |
| 2003 | Manzil | "Fini Reyge Dhunfineegaa" | | Solo |
| 2003 | Manzil | "Fini Fini Roalhithah" | | Solo |
| 2003 | Vehenee Vaarey | "Eyru Nooney Kiyaa Kiyaa" | | Aneesa Saeedh |
| 2004 | Ehan'dhaanugai... | "Tharutheebu Magun" | | Solo |
| 2004 | Falak | "Dheewaanaa" | | Solo |
| 2004 | Falak | "Moosun Mi Moosun" | | Solo |
| 2004 | Falak | "Nikan Ufalun" | | Solo |
| 2004 | Hooru | "Fiskoh Magey Hithaa Mey Zakhamukoh" | | Solo |
| 2004 | Ithubaaru | "Beevumun Loabi Magey" | Abdulla Muaz Yoosuf | |
| 2004 | Mariyaadhu | "Haama Kuramey Magey Hithuge Haal" | | Solo |
| 2004 | Mariyaadhu | "Heelaashe Kalaa Loabin" | | Solo |
| 2004 | Thibaa | "Enme Dhurugaa Viyas" | Abdulla Muaz Yoosuf | Solo |
| 2004 | Yaaraa | "Nala Ey Kalaa Nala Ey Mihaaru" | Abdulla Muaz Yoosuf | Aishath Inaya |
| 2005 | Dhilaasaa | "Maazeevi Han'dhaan" | | Solo |
| 2005 | Hilan | "Dhunfini Thereygaa" | | Solo |
| 2005 | Hilan | "Karunain Mi Themi Oyaalaa" | | Solo |
| 2005 | Hilan | "Nunidhey Han'dhaan Vaathee" | | Solo |
| 2005 | Hilan | "Annaashey Beynumee" | | Solo |
| 2005 | Maahiyaa | "Jaanaa, Hiyy Vanee Ey Dhiwaanaa" | Adam Naseer Ibrahim | Aishath Inaya |
| 2005 | Yaa Habeys | "Kuranvee Dance" | Adam Naseer Ibrahim | Moonisa Khaleel |
| 2005 | Zuvaanaa | "Isjehifaa Thiya Hureehey Ladhun" | | Solo |
| 2006 | Bichaanaa | "Hithuge Ran Loabi Thee Ey" | | Fathimath Zoona |
| 2006 | Bunebalaa | "Heyohithun Loabi Dhenyaa" | Easa Shareef | Thoahira Hussain |
| 2006 | Bunebalaa | "Thiya Heelun" | Hussain Rasheedh | Thoahira Hussain |
| 2006 | Hiyy Kiyaathee | "Yaaraa Ey Magey" | Ahmed Nashidh (Dharavandhoo) | Aishath Inaya |
| 2006 | Hiyy Roaney | "Annaashey Raanee Ey" | Adam Haleem Adnan | Solo |
| 2006 | Jism | "Hiyy Buneyey Roalaashey" | Ahmed Nashidh (Dharavandhoo) | Fazeela Amir |
| 2006 | Kisthee | "Chaalu Vanaathah" | | Solo |
| 2006 | Kisthee | "Hiyy Magey Roavarun" | | Fathimath Rauf |
| 2006 | Kisthee | "Neyngi Kisthee" | | Fathimath Zoona |
| 2006 | Mihan'dhaanugai... | "Dhin Mi Ummeedhugaa Rey" | | Solo |
| 2006 | Yaaraanulaa | "Chaaley Thiya Hinithunvun" | | Shifa Thaufeeq |
| 2007 | Hiyy Dheebalaa | "Ishquga Mi Maruvaanan" | Ahmed Nashidh (Dharavandhoo) | Solo |
| 2007 | Hiyy Dheebalaa | "Nunidhey Nunidhey Nunidhey" | Ahmed Nashidh (Dharavandhoo) | Solo |
| 2007 | Jaanaa | "Ey Nudhey Ehfaharu" | | Solo |
| 2007 | Thihan'dhaanugai... | "Ey Zamaanaa Vaguthu Dhiyaee" | Yoosuf Mohamedfulhu | Solo |
| 2008 | Beywafaa Viyas | "Majaa Kollaa" | | Solo |
| 2008 | Hiyy Dheewaanaa 4 | "Nuveythoa Ey Loabi" | Shareefa Fakhry | Fazeela Amir |
| 2008 | Hiyy Dheewaanaa 4 | "Lolugaavaa Thiya Jaadhoo" | Shareefa Fakhry | Fathimath Rauf |
| 2008 | Hiyy Dhoovee | "Sirru Sirrun Hithey" | | Aishath Inaya |
| 2008 | Hiyy Fanaa | "Rey Nidhin Yaaraa" | | Solo |
| 2008 | Hiyy Fanaa | "Ekani Kollaafaa Yaaru Nudhaashey" | | Solo |
| 2008 | Thihan'dhaanugai Remix | "Fari Paree" | Adam Haleem Adnan | Solo |
| 2009 | Aavedhaa | "Inthihaa Loabi Veveythee" | Abdulla Muaz Yoosuf | Solo |
| 2009 | Fari Kamana | "Loabiveema Hiyy Vaa Masthee" | Ahmed Haleem | Solo |
| 2009 | Fari Kamana | "Basnaahanee Hiyy Keehvehey" | Ahmed Haleem | Shifa Thaufeeq |
| 2009 | Hiyy Dheebalaa 2 | "Dhaashey Vayaa Ey" | Boi Ahmed Khaleel | Solo |
| 2009 | Hiyy Furendhen | "Abadhuves Feneyey Kalaa" | Ahmed Nashidh (Dharavandhoo) | Shifa Thaufeeq |
| 2009 | Loabi Vaathee | "Roalanhey Aashiqaa Ey" | Ahmed Nashidh (Dharavandhoo) | Solo |
| 2009 | Shaahee Kamana | "Shaahee Kamanaa Ey" | | Solo |
| 2009 | Shaahee Kamana | "Thiya Han'dhaanugaa Alhaa" | | Solo |
| 2010 | Jaadhuvee Thari | "Yaaraa Ey" | | Aishath Maain Rasheed |
| 2010 | Vasmeeru | "Rain Is Falling" | | Shifa Thaufeeq |
| 2011 | Hiyy Dheewaanaa 5 | "Meygaa Veyey Fenifaa Yaaraage Nan" | | Shifa Thaufeeq |
| 2011 | Hiyy Dheewaanaa 5 | "Hiyy Masthuvee" | | Moonisa Khaleel |
| 2011 | Tharinge Rey 2011 | "Mihithaa Thiyahen Nukulheyshey" | | Waleedha Waleed |
| 2012 | Edhuvasthah | "Loabivaathee Kiyaadheynamey" | Shareef | Solo |
| 2012 | Loabivumakee | "Aashiqun Maushooqunaa" | Ismail Shameem | Fathimath Zoona |
| 2013 | Hiyy Dheewaanaa 6 | "Aadhey Hithaa" | | Rafiyath Rameeza |
| 2013 | Hiyy Dheebalaa 3 | "Loaiybeh Thi Noon Nethey Mihithugaa" | | Rafiyath Rameeza |
| 2014 | Shuja 2014 | "Rayyithun Hovamaa Sujaa" | | Solo |
| 2017 | Ran Han'dhaanugai: S02 | "Loaiybakee Zaharu" | | Shafeeqa Abdul Latheef |
| 2018 | Maakanaakaloa | "Marutha Vaan Dhanee" | | Solo |
| 2019 | Shuja 2019 | "Vote Dhemaa Hovamaa Sujaa" | | Naash |

== Accolades ==
| Year | Award | Category | Nominated work | Result | Ref(s) |
|---|---|---|---|---|---|
| 2012 | 2nd Maldives Film Awards | Best Male Playback Singer | "Kalaa Beevumun" - Dhin Veynuge Hithaamaigaa | Won | |
