= Ali Ahmed (actor) =

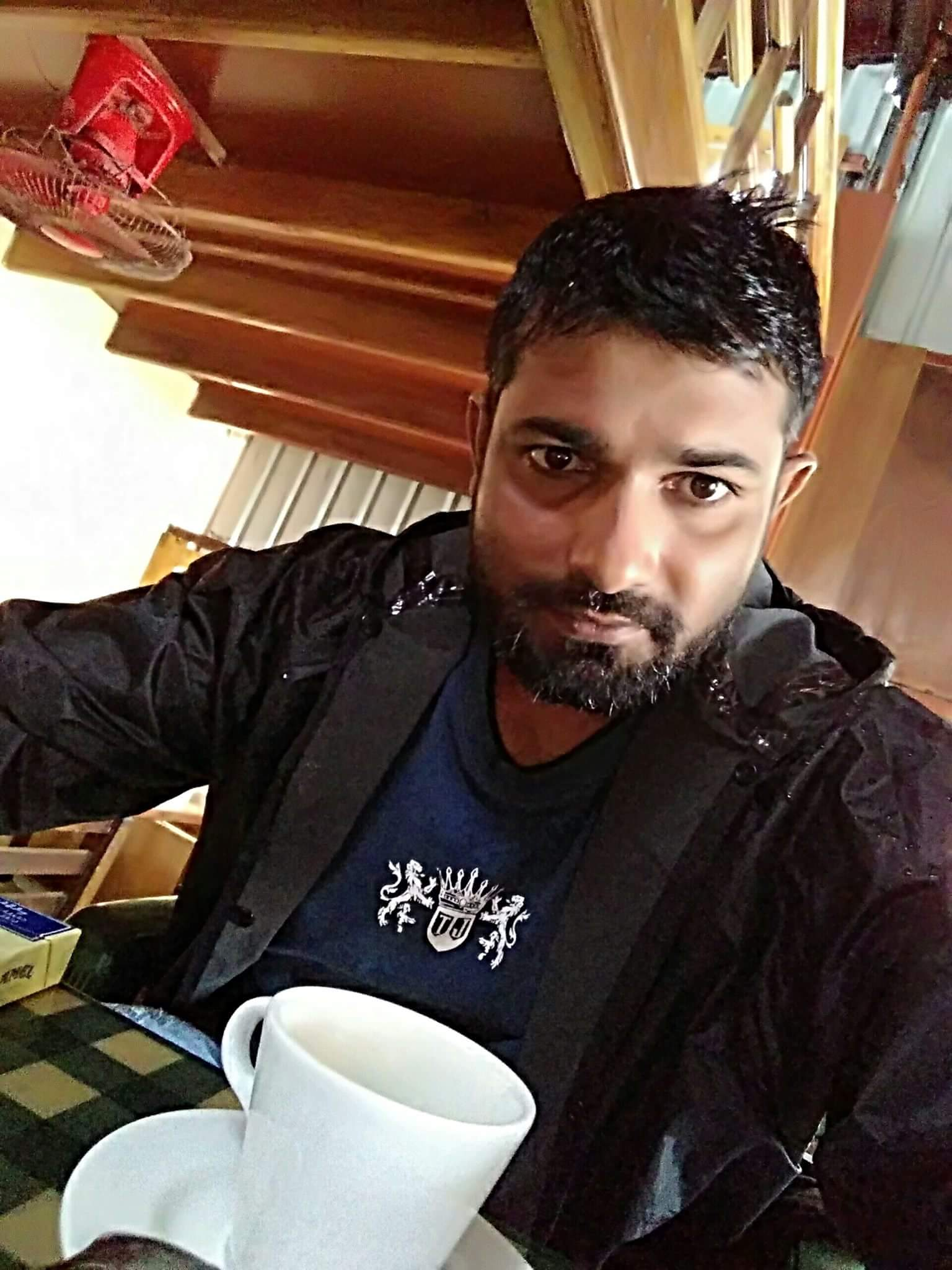
- Ali Ahmed
- Born: 1 October 1971; Sh. Komandoo, Maldives
- Died: 13 March 2017 (aged 45); Male', Maldives
- Occupation: Actor
- Years active: 2003–2011

Ali Ahmed (commonly known by his nicknames Hatharu Udhares Ayya, Komandoo Ayya, and Alifulhu in his hometown) was a prominent Maldivian actor celebrated for his contributions to the local film and television industry. Born and raised in Shaviyani Komandoo, Ali Ahmed showed a passion for acting and singing from a young age, despite losing his parents early in life. After completing his secondary education at Shaviyani Atoll Education Centre, he moved to Malé to pursue his dream of acting. His breakthrough came when he was cast as the lead in Hatharu Udhares, a feature film directed by Esa Shareef. The success of the film earned him widespread recognition and cemented his status as one of the most beloved figures in Maldivian entertainment. In addition to his roles in films and TV series, Ali Ahmed also appeared in numerous commercials.

== Career ==
In 2003, Ahmed played the role of a greedy man, in the Abdul Faththaah-directed critically acclaimed television series, Thiyey Mihithuge Vindhakee (2003) which was considered as one of the best series production in television industry. The following year, he made his official film debut in the action-adventure film Hatharu Udhares as a heart-broken Romeo, starring alongside Reeko Moosa Manik, Ali Seezan and Mariyam Manike. He next played a brief role of a ten-pin bowler in Fattah's horror film Eynaa (2004), in which appear Sheela Najeeb, Mohamed Manik, Ahmed Shah, Khadheeja Ibrahim Didi, Ibrahim Jihad and Nashidha Mohamed as six colleagues who go on a picnic to a haunted uninhabited island and their battle for survival. The film garnered critical appreciation especially for its technical department and was a commercial success.

Yoosuf Shafeeu directed horror film Edhathuru was released in 2004 in which appeared Mohamed Shavin, Sheereen Abdul Wahid, Ahmed, Lufshan Shakeeb, Fathmath Neelam, Nadhiya Hassan, Ibrahim Sobah and Yoosuf Solih as eight friends who go to an island and how they fight to survive the horrific incidents that befall them. The film was appreciated by critics, specifically praising its sound effects and was a commercial success. At the 4th Gaumee Film Awards ceremony, Ahmed was nominated as the Best Supporting Actor for his performance in the film. He collaborated with Fathimath Nahula for the first time in her critically and commercially successful romantic drama television series, Kalaage Haqqugaa (2005), to portray the role of Hussain, the younger brother from a non-identical twins who is forced to marry his sister-in-law.

In 2008, Ahmed appeared in a small role in Fathimath Nahula's romantic drama film, Yoosuf which depicts the story of a deaf and mute man (played by Yoosuf Shafeeu) who has been mistreated by a wealthy family, mocking his disability. Featuring an ensemble cast including Yoosuf Shafeeu, Niuma Mohamed, Sheela Najeeb, Ahmed Nimal, Fauziyya Hassan, Ravee Farooq, Zeenath Abbas and Ahmed Lais Asim, the film received widespread critical acclaim and attained blockbuster status at box office. Ahmed next starred as twins (Riyaz and Niyaz), in Yoosuf Shafeeu and Fathimath Nahula's direction, Soora released in 2008. The film was originally released as a television series to a positive response.

In 2010, Ahmed starred in Abdul Fahtah's horror film Jinni alongside Ali Seezan and Mariyam Afeefa. Based on true incidents that occurred in an island of Maldives, he played the friend of Javid who has been enthralled by a ghost. Prior to release, the film was marketed to be full of "suspense and uniqueness" compared to other Maldivian horror films. Upon release, the film received mixed reviews from critics; the majority of them complaining for having the "same old feeling" of prior horror films though the performances were noted to be satisfactory. Despite the mixed reviews, the film witnessed a positive response at the box office, declaring it as a Mega-Hit. His last film release was a collaboration with Amjad Ibrahim for his family drama Hithey Dheymee (2011) which received negative reviews from critics and was a box office disaster.

== Death ==
Ali Ahmed was pronounced dead on 13 March 2017 at 18:40 at H. Garden Beauty. At the time of his death, Ahmed was sentenced to house arrest for drug importation. After rumors that cause of his death was a drug overdose, Maldives Police Commission denied the rumors and confirmed that Ahmed had no external physical injuries. His funeral prayer was performed at Aasahara Mosque.

== Filmography ==
=== Feature film ===
Year	Title	Role	Notes	Ref(s)
2004	Hatharu Udhares	Adnan		
2004	Eynaa	Malakaa's lover	Special appearance	
2004	Edhathuru	Azmee	Nominated—Gaumee Film Award for Best Supporting Actor	
2008	Yoosuf	Mary's friend		
2010	Jinni	Fairooz		
2010	Magey Hithakee Hitheh Noon Hey?	Mohamed Hameed		
2011	Hithey Dheymee	Ahmed		

=== Television ===
Year	Title	Role	Notes	Ref(s)
2004	Thiyey Mihithuge Vindhakee	Hussain	Recurring role; 12 episodes	
2004	Kamana Vareh Neiy	Himself	Guest role; "Episode 4"	
2005	Kalaage Haqqugaa	Hussain	Main role	
2008	Soora	Riyaz / Niyaz	Main role	
2010	Magey Hithakee Hitheh Noon Hey?	Mohamed Hameed	Main role; 5 parts	

=== Short film ===
Year	Title	Role	Notes	Ref(s)
2008	Dhanthura	Dheulhi Dhon Moosafulhu		
2009	Santhi Mariyanbu 3	Shahid		

== Accolades ==
Year	Award	Category	Nominated work	Result	Ref(s)
2007	4th Gaumee Film Awards	Best Supporting Actor	Edhathuru	Nominated	
