= Hatharu Udhares =

- Official film poster
- Directed by: Easa Shareef; Mohamed Rasheed; Ibrahim Rasheed
- Written by: Moosa Latheef
- Screenplay by: Easa Shareef
- Produced by: EMA Productions
- Starring: Ali Seezan; Reeko Moosa Manik; Ali Ahmed; Mariyam Manike
- Cinematography: Ibrahim Wisan; Ahmed Amir
- Edited by: Mohamed Rasheed
- Music by: Imthiyaz
- Production company: EMA Productions
- Release date: March 10, 2004
- Country: Maldives
- Language: Dhivehi

Hatharu Udhares is a 2004 Maldivian action-adventure film directed by Easa Shareef, Mohamed Rasheed and Ibrahim Rasheed. Produced by EMA Productions, the film stars Ali Seezan, Reeko Moosa Manik, Ali Ahmed and Mariyam Manike in pivotal roles. The film was marketed as the first adventurous Maldivian film.

== Premise ==
Adnan (Ali Ahmed) a heart-broken Romeo is dejected as his ex-girlfriend, Nishmeen (Mariyam Manike) marries another man Junaid (Ali Seezan). As requested by Nishmeen's brother, Naseem (Reeko Moosa Manik), Adnan begins the journey by sea to a nearby island on his unreliable boat, with Naseem, Nishmeen, Junaid and Adnan's friend, Razzaq. In the trip, Adnan and Razzaq determines to unveil the true identity of Junaid; a person who has betrayed several women on the promise of marrying them. While they were preparing for departure, a wise man warns them about an incoming storm. Halfway to their destination, the engine of the boat stops abruptly while the storm hits them hard. As the four people gets stuck on the small boat, disputes arise between them leading to several fights and complications.

== Cast ==
- Ali Seezan as Junaid
- Reeko Moosa Manik as Naseem
- Ali Ahmed as Adnan
- Mariyam Manike as Nishmeen
- Nadheeha
- Nihaama
- Nazeeha
- Fauziyya Hassan as Naseem's mother
- Fayaz as Razzaq
- Ismail Rasheed
- Aminath Rasheedha as Adnan's mother
- Hussain Shibau as Naseem's family friend (special appearance)

== Development ==
The story was based on the novel of the same name published by Moosa Latheef on Haveeru Daily. The film marks the debut of actor Ali Ahmed and Mariyam Manike, and the only film which appears the latter on-screen. With the collapse of EMA in 2007, the ownership of the film was transferred solely to Ibrahim Rasheed. The film was registered under Maldivian Classification Board on 15 December 2009.

== Soundtrack ==
Track listing
No.	Title	Lyrics	Music	Singer(s)	Length
1.	"Vefaa Othee Dhen Kon Kushehbaaey?"	Easa Shareef	Abdul Hannan Moosa Didi	Abdul Hannan Moosa Didi, Shifa Thaufeeq

== Release and response ==
The film was released on 10 March 2004. Upon release, it received mixed to negative reviews from critics, where several critics lauded the post production of the film and the directors were criticized for releasing a "half-baked" film. The film was later made available for streaming on the digital platform Baiskoafu from 5 July 2020.
