= Zuleykha =

- Official film poster
- Directed by: Fathimath Nahula
- Written by: Fathimath Nahula
- Starring: Yoosuf Shafeeu; Mariyam Nisha; Sheela Najeeb; Ali Seezan; Mohamed Manik; Mariyam Enash Sinan
- Cinematography: Mohamed Rasheed; Mohamed Shiyaz; Hussain Imthiyaz
- Edited by: Sadha Ahmed
- Music by: Mohamed Shahuban
- Production company: Mapa
- Release date: July 19, 2005
- Country: Maldives
- Language: Dhivehi

Zuleykha is a 2005 Maldivian romantic drama film written and directed by Fathimath Nahula. Produced under Mapa, the film stars Yoosuf Shafeeu, Mariyam Nisha, Sheela Najeeb, Mohamed Manik and Mariyam Enash Sinan in pivotal roles.

== Plotline ==
The story is mainly based on the unconditional love of a father (Yoosuf Shafeeu) towards his only daughter (Mariyam Enash Sinan).

Shahid (Yoosuf Shafeeu) a dedicated tailor working at a company owned by a rich businessman engages in a romantic relationship with the owner's daughter, Zuleykha (Mariyam Nisha) despite her father's detestation. Shahid was fired from his workplace and ultimately quits his relationship with Zuleykha considering the barriers between their social classes. On a visit to a nearby island, Shahid meets Ashiya (Sheela Najeeb) who instantly falls in love with Shahid. Contemplating that Ashiya can distract him from his memories with Zuleykha, Shahid marries Ashiya but his life takes a toll due to her insolent behavior. At the time of pregnancy, she tried to abort their child only be stopped when Shahid promised her they will relocate to Male' sooner.

Shahid fails to convince his father to allow them stay at his house in Male'. He return to the island, only to discover Ashiya having an extramarital affair with her ex-lover where Shahid exposed her truth to the whole island and divorced her. He moved to Male' with his daughter, Zuleykha (Mariyam Enash Sinan) and starts working at a hotel where the owner of the place allowed him to stay at his place being impressed with his dignity and honesty. Meanwhile, Shahid consults Dr. Suheil, (Ali Seezan) who is Zuleykha's husband for having frequent headaches and coughing up bloody phlegm where he was diagnosed with final stage of cancer.

Shahid decided to hide the fact for Zuleykha and try to spend most of his time with her. However, on Zuleykha's birthday Shahid died after giving his daughter's custody to Zuleykha and Suheli and left a note for Zuleykha, in which he advice her to be kind to everyone and always do good deeds.

== Cast ==
- Yoosuf Shafeeu as Shahid
- Ali Seezan as Dr. Suheil; Zuleykha's husband
- Mohamed Manik as Fazeel; Ashiya's boyfriend
- Mariyam Nisha as Zuleykha / Zul; Shahid's sister
- Sheela Najeeb as Ashiya; Shahid's ex-wife
- Mariyam Enash Sinan as Zuleykha Shahid
- Ahmed Asim as Hamid
- Aminath Shareef as Zuleykha's teacher (special appearance)
- Maryam Shafaza Shameem as Seema; Shahid's friend
- Mishka Fazeel as Ashiya's daughter

== Soundtrack ==
Track listing
No.	Title	Lyrics	Singer(s)	Length
1.	"Loabivaaya Nulaa" (Male version)	Mausoom Shakir	Mumthaz Moosa	6:26
2.	"Haadha Loaiybey Dho"	Mausoom Shakir	Shifa Thaufeeq	5:29
3.	"Bappage Loa"	Mausoom Shakir	Abdul Baaree, Mariyam Enash Sinan	6:01
4.	"Heevey Ladhugannahen"	Mausoom Shakir	Hassan Ilham, Fathimath Rauf	5:54
5.	"Thi Loaiybah Hiyy Kiyaaleema"	Mausoom Shakir	Ibrahim Zaid Ali, Aishath Inaya	5:37
6.	"Giyaamath"	Mausoom Shakir	Mohamed Zaidh, Fathimath Zoona	6:11
7.	"Beevedhaathee"	Mausoom Shakir	Mohamed Shahuban	6:25
8.	"Mammaaey Mihithuga"	Adam Haleem Adnan	Mariyam Enash Sinan	5:41
9.	"Edhenee Thiya Loaibaa"	Mausoom Shakir	Moonisa Khaleel	5:41
10.	"Loabivaaya Nulaa" (Female version)	Mausoom Shakir	Fathimath Zoona	6:26

== Accolades ==
Year	Award	Category	Recipients	Result	Ref.
2007	Miadhu Crystal Award	Best Film	Zuleykha	Won	
2007	Miadhu Crystal Award	Best Director	Fathimath Nahula	Won	
2007	Miadhu Crystal Award	Best Actor	Yoosuf Shafeeu	Won	
2007	Miadhu Crystal Award	Best Supporting Actor	Mohamed Manik	Won	
2007	Miadhu Crystal Award	Best Child Artist	Mariyam Enash Sinan	Won	
2007	Miadhu Crystal Award	Best Makeup	Shareefa Fakhree, Mohamed Manik	Won	
2007	Miadhu Crystal Award	Best Story	Fathimath Nahula	Won	
2007	Miadhu Crystal Award	Best Cinematography	Mohamed Rasheed, Mohamed Shiyaz, Hussain Imthiyaz	Won	
2007	4th Gaumee Film Awards	Best Film	Zuleykha	Nominated	
2007	4th Gaumee Film Awards	Best Director	Fathimath Nahula	Nominated	
2007	4th Gaumee Film Awards	Best Actor	Yoosuf Shafeeu	Nominated	
2007	4th Gaumee Film Awards	Best Actress	Mariyam Nisha	Nominated	
2007	4th Gaumee Film Awards	Best Supporting Actor	Ali Seezan	Won	
2007	4th Gaumee Film Awards	Best Supporting Actor	Mohamed Manik	Nominated	
2007	4th Gaumee Film Awards	Best Supporting Actress	Sheela Najeeb	Won	
2007	4th Gaumee Film Awards	Best Screenplay	Fathimath Nahula	Won	
2007	4th Gaumee Film Awards	Best Child Artist	Mariyam Enash Sinan	Won	
2007	4th Gaumee Film Awards	Best Costume Design	Jadhulla Ismail, Laila	Won	
