= Hiyy Vindhaa Nulaa =

- Official film poster
- Directed by: Mohamed Aboobakuru
- Written by: Ahmed Iqbal
- Screenplay by: Mohamed Aboobakuru
- Produced by: Mohamed Aboobakuru
- Starring: Shafiu Mohamed; Mariyam Naajee; Muslima Abdulla; Mariyam Afeefa
- Cinematography: Mohamed Aboobakuru
- Edited by: Mohamed Aboobakuru
- Music by: Ayyuman Shareef
- Production company: Enboo Maa Studio
- Release date: February 2, 2011
- Country: Maldives
- Language: Dhivehi

Hiyy Vindhaa Nulaa is a 2011 Maldivian romantic drama film produced and directed by Mohamed Aboobakuru. Produced by Emboo Maa Studio, the film stars Shafiu Mohamed, Mariyam Naajee, Muslima Abdulla and Mariyam Afeefa in pivotal roles. The film was released on 2 February 2011.

== Synopsis ==
Maisha (Mariyam Naajee), the mother of two children is diagnosed with a blood trauma which devastates her caring husband, Shafiu Mohamed (Visham). Counting her last days, Maisha requests Visham to marry another woman and to settle with his life before she dies. Hesitated, Visham marries his ex-girlfriend, Suzy (Muslima Abdulla)

== Cast ==
- Shafiu Mohamed as Visham
- Mariyam Naajee as Maisha
- Muslima Abdulla as Suzy
- Aishath Rafa Rashadh
- Ahmed Zaul Rasheed
- Mariyam Afeefa
- Fathimath Jeeza
- Fauziyya Hassan as Suzy's mother
- Ibrahim Manik
- Ahmed Riffath
- Ahmed Waheed
- Ibrahim Naseem

== Soundtrack ==
Track listing
| No. | Title | Lyrics | Music | Singer(s) | Length |
|---|---|---|---|---|---|
| 1. | "Vaudhaa Huvaa Mee Kuraa" | Shifa Thaufeeq | Ayyuman Shareef | Hassan Ilham, Shifa Thaufeeq |
| 2. | "Dharifulhaa Nidhaalaashey" (Female Version) | Shifa Thaufeeq | Ayyuman Shareef | Shifa Thaufeeq |
| 3. | "Vaudhaa Huvaa Mee Kuraa" (Sad Version) | Shifa Thaufeeq | Ayyuman Shareef | Hassan Ilham, Shifa Thaufeeq |
| 4. | "Moosun Nalae Reehchey Kalaa" | Shifa Thaufeeq | Ayyuman Shareef | Hassan Ilham, Shifa Thaufeeq |
| 5. | "Meehe Ebunaa Loaiybakee?" | Shifa Thaufeeq | Ayyuman Shareef | Hassan Ilham, Shifa Thaufeeq |
| 6. | "Dharifulhaa Nidhaalaashey" (Male Version) | Shifa Thaufeeq | Ayyuman Shareef | Hassan Ilham |
