= Kalaage Haqqugaa =

Maldivian romantic drama television series

- Genre: Romantic drama
- Created by: Fathimath Nahula
- Written by: Fathimath Nahula
- Screenplay by: Fathimath Nahula
- Directed by: Fathimath Nahula
- Starring: Niuma Mohamed; Ali Ahmed; Ali Seezan; Jamsheedha Ahmed; Sheela Najeeb; Nashidha Mohamed; Aminath Rasheedha; Ali Shameel
- No. of seasons: 1
- No. of episodes: 18

Production
- Running time: 23–25 minutes

Original release
- Network: Television Maldives
- Release: 2005

Kalaage Haqqugaa is a Maldivian romantic drama television series developed for Television Maldives by Fathimath Nahula. The series stars Niuma Mohamed, Ali Ahmed, Ali Seezan, Jamsheedha Ahmed, Sheela Najeeb, Aminath Rasheedha and Ali Shameel in pivotal roles.

== Premise ==
Hassan (Ali Seezan) and Hussain (Ali Ahmed) are the only children of Faiz (Ali Shameel) and Waheedha (Aminath Rasheedha). The couple is revealed that Hussain is a thalassemia carrier. The non-identical twins grew up with an orphan, Imna (Niuma Mohamed) who stays at their house, Faiz's business partner, Anwar's (Roanu Hassan Manik) only daughter, Nuzu (Jamsheedha Ahmed later played by Sheela Najeeb) and Zeena (Nashidha Mohamed), a neighbor. Nuzu and Hassan marries while Imna and Hussain's secret love affair is being exposed to Waheedha by Zeena, who secretly is in love with Hussain. Imna is expelled from the house in a desperate act by Nuzu to frame Imna having a secretive relationship with their guest, Zubair (Ahmed Saeed). Hussain follows Imna and cuts off the ties with his family and decides to marry her.

Hassan leaves to HDh. Kulhudhuffushi to join Hussain and Imna on their wedding while he dies when the boat he was travelling capsizes into the sea. The whole family is traumatized on hearing the news of grief. Faiz requests Hassan to stay with them for around five months. Afterwards, to strengthen the family relations and to honor Hassan's memory, Waheedha arranges Hussain and Nuzu's marriage.

== Cast and characters ==
=== Main ===
- Niuma Mohamed as Aishath Imna
- Ali Ahmed as Hussain
- Ali Seezan as Hassan (3 episodes)
- Jamsheedha Ahmed as Nuzu (7 episodes)
- Sheela Najeeb as Nuzu (6 episodes)
- Aminath Rasheedha as Waheedha as Hussain's mother
- Ali Shameel as Faiz; Hussain's father

=== Recurring ===
- Roanu Hassan Manik as Anwar; Nuzu's father
- Nashidha Mohamed as Zeena
- Ahmed Saeed as Zubair
- Aminath Shareef as Zeena's mother
- Chilhiya Moosa Manik as Habeeb; Imna's uncle
- Arifa Ibrahim as Habeeb's wife

=== Guest ===
- Hassan Haleem as a Radio Journalist
- Ali Shahid as a dancer in the song "Veynaa Udhaahaa"

== Soundtrack ==
Track listing
No.	Title	Lyrics	Singer(s)	Length
1.	"Veynaa Udhaahaa"	Adam Haleem Adnan	Mumthaz Moosa, Fathimath Rauf
2.	"Veynaa Udhaahaa" (Female version)	Adam Haleem Adnan	Shaheedha Mohamed
3.	"Veynaa Udhaahaa" (Male slow version)	Adam Haleem Adnan	Mumthaz Moosa
4.	"Veynaa Udhaahaa" (Female slow version)	Adam Haleem Adnan	Shaheedha Mohamed
5.	"Mooney Mooney" (Female Version)	Ahmed Shakeeb	Moonisa Khaleel
6.	"Mooney Mooney" (Male Version)	Ahmed Shakeeb	Hassan Ilham
