= Magey Hithakee Hitheh Noon Hey? =

2010 Maldivian drama series

- Official film poster
- Written by: Shareefa Fakhri
- Screenplay by: Shareefa Fakhri
- Directed by: Shareefa Fakhri
- Starring: Ali Ahmed; Amira Ismail; Nadhiya Hassan
- Music by: Muaviyath Anwar
- Country of origin: Maldives
- Original language: Dhivehi

Production
- Producer: Suneetha Ali
- Cinematography: Shivaz Abdulla
- Editor: Ali Musthafa
- Running time: 81 minutes (Part 1); 71 minutes (Part 2); 64 minutes (Part 3); 66 minutes (Part 4); 36 minutes (Part 5)
- Production company: SSA Production

Original release
- Release: 2010

Magey Hithakee Hitheh Noon Hey? is a 2010 Maldivian romantic drama series written and directed by Shareefa Fakhri. Produced by Suneetha Ali under SSA Production, the film stars Amira Ismail and Nadhiya Hassan as two cousins who fall in love with the same man, played by Ali Ahmed.

== Premise ==
=== Part one ===
At a very young age, Sameera's (Amira Ismail) parent pass away and she was raised by her beholden aunt, Saleema (Fauziyya Hassan) whose only child, Salma (Nadhiya Hassan) is living in Male' to complete her higher education. Sameera falls deeply in love with Mohamed (Ali Ahmed) who returns to the island after a long break. Similarly, Mohamed becomes romantically attracted to Sameera though Salma (Nadhiya Hassan) tries getting closer to him. Observing his change in his behavior, Mohamed's parents inquired about his love life, to which Mohamed shares his plans to marry Salma, where his mother, Rasheedha outright rejects it since Sameera is an underprivileged orphan.

=== Part two ===
Salma secures a job as a nurse in the island's hospital. Unaware of Rasheedha's dissent towards their relationship, Sameera continues dating Mohamed until her aunt finds out about them. Wishing all the happiness to her child, Rasheedha changes her mind and takes Mohamed's wedding proposal to Saleema which breaks Salma's heart who intends to propose to Mohamed on his birthday.

=== Part three ===
Salma hides her affection but starts throwing shade at Sameera. Mohamed and Sameera marry and lives a happy life with their new born child.

=== Part four ===
Unable to find a decent job from the island, the family struggles with their financial limitation which creates lot of troubles with their parents. Desperate for an income source, Mohamed decides to go sailing for one year, which Sameera initially dismisses fearing his fate to be the same as of her father. Mohamed gets hold of a love letter written by Salma which was subjected to him.

=== Part five ===
Saleema becomes extremely sick and Sameera suggests she retires from her job to which Salma shares her concern. A year later, Mohamed makes an unexpected return.

== Cast ==
- Ali Ahmed as Mohamed Hameed
- Amira Ismail as Sameera
- Nadhiya Hassan as Salma
- Roanu Hassan Manik as Abdulla Hameed
- Fauziyya Hassan as Saleema
- Sameera Ahmed as Saadhuna
- Latheefa as Rasheedha
- Waheedha
- School Student 1 - Eema Naaz

== Soundtrack ==
Track listing
No.	Title	Lyrics	Music	Singer(s)	Length
1.	"Magey Hithakee Hitheh Noonhey?"	Adam Haleem Adnan	Ibrahim Zaid Ali	Ibrahim Zaid Ali, Moonisa Khaleel	4:20
2.	"Mi Dhefai Olhi"	Ahmed Haleem		Shifa Thaufeeq	3:57
3.	"Hiyy Masthuvey"			Hassan Ilham, Moonisa Khaleel	4:24
4.	"Loabi Vevuneemaa Mithuraa"	Ahmed Haleem			5:32
5.	"Mihithah Araameh Nulibenee"			Shifa Thaufeeq	5:56
6.	"Dhurugaa Hunnan Foohivanee"			Ahmed Fazeel	4:29
7.	"Mihithah Araameh Nulibenee" (Sad version)			Suneetha Ali	2:23
8.	"Magey Hiyy Ekaniverive Rovey"			Suneetha Ali	1:17
