= Laelaa =

- Directed by: Hamid Ali
- Written by: Hamid Ali
- Screenplay by: Hamid Ali
- Produced by: Hamid Ali
- Starring: Yoosuf Shafeeu; Hamid Ali; Amira Ismail; Hassan Manik; Ahmed Easa
- Music by: Ayyuman Shareef
- Production company: Learner's Production
- Release date: September 29, 2011
- Country: Maldives
- Language: Dhivehi

Laelaa is a 2011 Maldivian romantic drama film produced and directed by Hamid Ali. Produced under Learner's Production, the film stars Yoosuf Shafeeu, Amira Ismail, Hamid Ali, Hassan Manik and Ahmed Easa in pivotal roles. The titular role was initially offered to Fathimath Fareela, but was ultimately played by Amira Ismail. The film was released on 29 September 2011.

== Cast ==
- Yoosuf Shafeeu as Ziyad
- Amira Ismail as Laela
- Ahmed Easa as Shivan
- Fathimath Azifa as Leena
- Hamid Ali as Ahammaa
- Roanu Hassan Manik as Laelaa and Leena's father
- Mariyam Haleem as Laelaa and Leena's mother
- Koyya Hassan Manik as Hassan Manik
- Arifa Ibrahim
- Neena Saleem
- Mariyam Shahuza
- Niuma Mohamed as the item number "Dhuniyein Laelaa" (Special appearance)

== Soundtrack ==
Track listing
No.	Title	Singer(s)	Length
1.	"Kuramey Rovey"	Rafiyath Rameeza	05:51
2.	"Fari Nala Thibaage Soora"	Abdul Baaree, Shifa Thaufeeq	05:04
3.	"Alhe Gaigaa Dhen Beehilaashey"	Mumthaz Moosa, Fathimath Zoona	05:02
4.	"Dhuniyein Laelaa"	Mohamed Abdul Ghanee, Aminath Nashidha	04:50
5.	"Dharifulhu"	Aishath Afaaf	04:30
6.	"Mihiree Kalaayahtakaa"	Ibrahim Zaid Ali, Shaheedha Mohamed	05:51
7.	"Mifuraana Ekugaa"	Ibrahim Zaid Ali, Shaheedha Mohamed	01:55
8.	"Naseebuge Aee Ranzamaaney"	Hassan Jalaal, Shifa Thaufeeq	04:55
9.	"Neydhemey Badhunaamakun"	Hassan Ilham	06:26
Total length:			44:35

== Release and response ==
The film was released on 29 September 2011. Upon release the film received negative response from critics. Ahmed Nadheem from Haveeru Daily was satisfied with the moral of the story while blaming the weak screenplay for the "fragile film". "Laela is too slow and dragged, some scenes get too lengthy leaving the audience yawning at boredom. The story is predictable and lacks reality".
