= Moonisa Khaleel =

Maldivian female singer

- Born: 6 November 1974 (age 50); Male', Maldives
- Occupation: Playback singer
- Years active: 1990–2013
- Musical career
- Genres: Pop; filmi; electronic
- Instrument: Vocals

Moonisa Khaleel (6 November 1974) is a Maldivian playback singer.

== Career ==
Khaleel began singing at a young age while studying at Malé English School, often performing at Kresendo shows. After finishing her studies, she joined the Antaris band of Dhivehi Raajjeyge Adu and featured in multiple albums including, Scope '90, Chance, Abaarana, Theeru, Hithuge Loabi, Han'dhaan, Moosun and the Galaxyge Therein series. After leaving the band in 2004, she transitioned to singing for films, television series and commercial albums. Her debut film song was featured in Fathimath Nahula's Zuleykha (2005), where she performed the song "Edhenee Thiya Loaiybaa Ufalaa", to the tune of "Gali Mein Aaj Chaand Nikla". Afterwards, she rendered popular songs including "Loabi Lee Oyaa" and "Theeye Hithugaa Mivaa Vindhakee" for the film Yoosuf, the title track of Karuna Vee Beyvafa and "Mausoomu Hiyy" for Veeraana for which she received a Gaumee Film Award nomination for Best Female Playback Singer. Khaleel also performed popular theme tracks for Arifa Ibrahim's television series including Vairoalhi Ahves Sirrun and Vaguthu Faaithu Nuvanees, as well as collaborating with Suneetha Ali for Magey Hithakee Hitheh Noon Hey? series and Hiyy Dheewaanaa album series.

== Discography ==
=== Films ===
Year	Film	Song	Lyricist(s)	Co-artist(s)
2005	Zuleykha	"Edhenee Thiya Loaiybaa Ufalaa"	Mausoom Shakir	Solo
2006	Vaaloabi Engeynama	"Vaaloabi En'geynama" (Slow Version)	Mohamed Abdul Ghanee	Solo
2008	Yoosuf	"Loabi Lee Oyaa"	Mausoom Shakir	Mumthaz Moosa
2008	Yoosuf	"Theeye Hithugaa Mivaa Vindhakee"	Adam Haleem Adhnan	Mumthaz Moosa
2009	Udhabaani	"Hiyy Ufaavey Mireyge Haflaagaa" (Bonus Song)	Ismail Huzam	Solo
2009	Karuna Vee Beyvafa	"Karuna Vee Beywafaa"	Mohamed Abdul Ghanee	Mohamed Abdul Ghanee
2009	Baaraige Fas	"Fenifaa Zuvaan Thibaayaa"	Ahmed Nashidh (Dharavandhoo)	Mohamed Farhad
2010	Mi Hiyy Keekkuraanee?	"Kairivelanthoa Kairi Kurey"	Ahmed Nashidh (Dharavandhoo)	Abdul Baaree
2010	Maafeh Neiy	"Loadhe Furigen Karuna Foodhey"	Mohamed Abdul Ghanee	Solo
2010	Veeraana	"Mausoomu Hiyy"	Adam Haleem Adhnan	Ibrahim Zaid Ali
2010	Veeraana	"Theeye Hithugaa Mivaa Vindhakee" (Bonus Song)	Adam Haleem Adhnan	Mumthaz Moosa
2010	Vakinuvinama	"Vakinuvinama" (Theme Song)	Mohamed Abdul Ghanee	Solo
2010	Heyonuvaane	"Loabivaa Ey"	Mausoom Shakir	Mumthaz Moosa
2011	Hiyy Yaara Dheefa	"Thivee Beywafaa" (Version 2)	Mohamed Abdul Ghanee	Mumthaz Moosa

=== Short films ===
Year	Film	Song	Lyricist(s)	Co-artist(s)
2005	Dheke Dhekeves 2	"Kuranvee Dance"	Adam Naseer Ibrahim	Hassan Ilham
2006	Dheke Dhekeves 4	"Jismaai Mey Thiya Lee Nolhaa"	Adam Haleem Adhnan	Mumthaz Moosa
2008	Jinneenge Dharubaaru	"Hiyy Ufaavey Mireyge Haflaagaa"	Ismail Huzam	Solo

=== Television ===
Year	Film	Song	Lyricist(s)	Co-artist(s)
2005	Kalaage Haqqugaa	"Mooney Mooney" (Female Version)	Ahmed Shakeeb	Solo
2005	Vairoalhi Ahves Sirrun	"Vairoalhiahves Sirrun" (Female Version)	Ahmed Nashidh (Dharavandhoo)	Solo
2006	Vaguthu Faaithu Nuvanees	"Vaguthu Faaithu Nuvanees" (Theme Song)	Ahmed Nashidh (Dharavandhoo)	Solo
2009	Vakinuvaan Bunefaa Vaudheh Nuvanhey?	"Vakinuvaan Bunefaa Vaudheh Nuvanhey" (Theme Song)		Ibrahim Zaid Ali
2010	Magey Hithakee Hitheh Noon Hey?	"Magey Hithakee Hitheh Noonhey" (Theme Song)	Adam Haleem Adhnan	Ibrahim Zaid Ali
2010	Magey Hithakee Hitheh Noon Hey?	"Hiyy Masthuvee Fenifaa Kalaa"		Hassan Ilham

=== Non-film Songs ===
Year	Album/Single	Song	Lyricist(s)	Co-artist(s)
1990	Scope '90	"Dhiruvaa Nishaaney Libidhaanebaa Ey"	Abdulla Afeef	Solo
1990	Scope '90	"Vee Dheyshe Hithaa Roohun Thedhekey"	Abdulla Afeef	Solo
1990	Scope '90	"Maadhamaa Ufaaveri Edheyshey"	Abdulla Afeef	Solo
1990	Scope '90	"Ma Dhuniyeyn Fanaavaaney"	Abdulla Afeef	Abdulla Rasheedh
1991	Single	"Hithugaa Dhorufaiy Hulhuvaaladhee"		Solo
1992	Chance	"Dhey Isnegun Ma Ruhey"		Abdul Raoof
1992	Galaxyge Therein 3	"Haasve Hiyy Molhivey"		Abdul Raoof
1992	Galaxyge Therein 3	"Hureemey Hureemey Aadhe Dhaan"		Abdul Raoof
1993	Galaxyge Therein 4	"Hiyy Farudhaa Kureethoa"		Abdul Raoof
1993	Galaxyge Therein 4	"Loa Meri Hiyy Ufaa"		Ibrahim Shakeeb
1994	Galaxyge Therein 5	"Loabi Oyaalaa Vaudhu Uvaalaa"		Solo
1994	Galaxyge Therein 5	"Fini Hiyalugaa Han'dhuge Alivaa"	Yoosuf Mohamedfulhu	Abdul Hannan Moosa Didi
1994	Galaxyge Therein 5	"Milkuveri Dheloa E Ohoranee"		Solo
1997	Beyqaraar	"Khiyaaluthah Kureveythee Ey"		Solo
2001	Abaarana	"Dheyshey Kalaa Beynumey Hithaa"		Abdul Raoof
2001	Abaarana	"Ey Khiyaaleh Beynun"		Imaadh Ismail
2001	Theeru	"Vaaneythoa Belee Ey"		Solo
2001	Theeru	"Fennaanee Hayaathugaa"		Solo
2001	Theeru	"Hun Yageeney Zuvaan"		Solo
2002	Hithuge Loabi	"Hen'dhunaa Haveeraa"		Solo
2002	Hithuge Loabi	"Vakivaan Jehumun Rovenee Ey"		Ibrahim Shakeeb
2003	Han'dhaan	"Leygaa Hin'gaa"		Solo
2003	Qaumee Lava: Vol. 1	"Mala Reethi Nalavi Rahthah"		Solo
2004	Moosun	"Abadhu Nufilaa Hithun"		Abdul Raoof
2005	Ulhe Ulhefa	"Eheevey Loabivaa Mithuraa"	Adam Haleem Adhnan	Abdulla Waheedh (Waddey)
2005	Yaa' Habeys	"Kuranvee Dance"	Adam Naseer Ibrahim	Hassan Ilham
2006	Dhenves	"Dheewaanaa Vedhanee Ey"	Mohamed Abdul Ghanee	Mumthaz Moosa
2006	Dhenves	"Moonu Balaa Foohiveehey"	Rusthulla Ismail	Abdulla Waheedh (Waddey)
2006	Dhenves	"Vee Loabin Kohdheefi Ufaa"	Hussain Sobah	Hussain Sobah
2006	Hiyy Dheewaanaa 3	"Beynunvey Adhu Ekugaa"	Shareefa Fakhry	Abdul Baaree
2006	Oh' Salhi	"Jismaai Mey"	Adam Haleem Adhnan	Mumthaz Moosa
2006	Single	"Fehi Mi Rivethi Qaumu Magey"		Hussain Sobah
2007	Salaamey	"Naazunee O Magey Naazunee"	Ahmed Nashidh (Dharavandhoo)	Abdul Baaree
2008	Hiyy Dheewaanaa 4	"Kairivelanthoa Kairi Kurey"	Ahmed Nashidh (Dharavandhoo)	Abdul Baaree
2008	Kalaa Haadha Loaiybey	"Dhera Hiyy Vee Mithuraa Dhaathee Ey"	Ahmed Falah	Mohamed Farhad
2011	Hiyy Dheewaanaa 5	"Hiyy Masthuvee Fenifaa Kalaa"		Hassan Ilham
2013	Hiyy Dheebalaa 3	"Naazunee O Magey Naazunee"	Ahmed Nashidh (Dharavandhoo)	Abdul Baaree
2013	Hiyy Dheewaanaa 6	"Masthee Loa Vee Hulhuvaashey"		Hassan Jalaal

== Accolades ==
Year	Award	Category	Nominated work	Result	Ref(s)
2015	6th Gaumee Film Awards	Best Female Playback Singer	"Mausoom Hiyy" – Veeraana	Nominated	
