= Edhathuru =

- Official film poster
- Directed by: Yoosuf Shafeeu
- Written by: Mohamed Qasim
- Screenplay by: Yoosuf Shafeeu
- Produced by: Mohamed Abdulla
- Starring: Mohamed Shavin; Sheereen Abdul Wahid; Ali Ahmed; Lufshan Shakeeb; Fathmath Neelam; Nadhiya Hassan; Ibrahim Sobah; Yoosuf Solih
- Cinematography: Ali Rasheed
- Edited by: Yoosuf Shafeeu; Ali Rasheed
- Music by: Ayyuman Shareef
- Production company: Mai Dream Entertainments
- Release date: September 15, 2004
- Running time: 2 hours
- Country: Maldives
- Language: Dhivehi

Edhathuru is a 2004 Maldivian horror film directed by Yoosuf Shafeeu. Produced by Mohamed Abdulla under Mai Dream Entertainments, the film stars Mohamed Shavin, Sheereen Abdul Wahid, Ali Ahmed, Lufshan Shakeeb, Fathmath Neelam, Nadhiya Hassan, Ibrahim Sobah and Yoosuf Solih in pivotal roles.

== Plot ==
A group of eight friends goes on a picnic to a nearby uninhabited island. They start roaming around the island having fun and playing sports. They encounter a man whose name is Hamid (Hamid Ali), who has been living on the island in a hut. He warns the group to return home before night falls. Things fall apart when Azmee (Ali Ahmed) teases his crush Husna (Sheereen Abdul Wahid) who is in a relationship with Dhaain (Mohamed Shavin). Due to low-tide, they were unable to travel back by sea hence they decided to stay on the island for the night and leave at the earliest light. After the planned night fishing, they spent the rest of the night barbecuing and enjoying horror stories. On exchanging stories, Hamid tells a true incident that had occurred on the island.

Several years ago, Hamid's son, Eevan (Yoosuf Shafeeu) discovers his girlfriend, Taniya (Khadheeja Ibrahim Didi) is having affairs with other men. Possessed by a spirit inside him, Eevan stabs Taniya killing her. Discovering that he killed Taniya with his own hands, Eevan undergoes a mental breakdown. Hamid brings him to the island where they are currently staying, to distract him and separate him from the society and dies there. Unaish goes to the boat to fetch a torch and is killed by an unknown spirit. Distressed by Unaish's absence, Dhaain goes to the place where the boat was placed and discovers the boat is missing. The whole group gathers to the beach only to find the boat sunk in the sea while Unaish's torch on the ground. They are unable to call anyone due to no connection or signal for their mobile phones.

The group encounters several horrifying incidents. Reena (Nadhiya Hassan) disappears and the event is linked to Azmee. Perturbed with their disappearing the group continuously kept searching for them in the woods only to find Unaish's corpse lying in the bush. They later uncover Reena and Hamid's bodies beaten to death. Suspicious of Azmee's involvement in all deaths, Dhaain ties him up to a tree, only to witness Yooshau's death. One by one, members of the group is murdered including Dhaain, Husna and Husham. After the panicking events, a boat sees Taniya and Azmee waving on the island and comes to rescue them. Fearing they will not survive, Azmee rushes into the island to distract the spirit. He was able to come back to the time the boat reaches the shore and so is followed by the spirit.

== Cast ==
- Mohamed Shavin as Dhaain
- Sheereen Abdul Wahid as Husna
- Ali Ahmed as Azmee
- Lufshan Shakeeb as Husham
- Fathmath Neelam as Taniya
- Nadhiya Hassan as Reena
- Ibrahim Sobah as Unaish
- Yoosuf Solih as Yooshau
- Hamid Ali as Hamid
- Ahmed Asim as Ahmed
- Yoosuf Shafeeu as Eevan
- Khadheeja Ibrahim Didi as Taniya
- Ahmed Azmeel as Anas (Special appearance)
- Abdulla Muaz as Taniya's secret boyfriend (Special appearance)

== Soundtrack ==
Track listing
No.	Title	Lyrics	Singer(s)	Length
1.	"Iru Ossunas Dhen Mihaaru"	Ahmed Nashidh (Dharavandhoo)	Shifa Thaufeeq	5:05
2.	"Hiyy Edhey Varun"	Ahmed Shakeeb	Mohamed Fazeel, Shifa Thaufeeq	4:59
3.	"Behidhaaneyey"	Kaneeru Abdul Raheem	Shifa Thaufeeq, Hassan Ilham	3:45
4.	"Vaadhera Nethi"	Ahmed Nashidh (Dharavandhoo)	Ali Abdulla, Shifa Thaufeeq	4:31

== Accolades ==
Award	Category	Recipients	Result	Ref(s)
4th Gaumee Film Awards	Best Supporting Actor	Ali Ahmed	Nominated	
4th Gaumee Film Awards	Best Supporting Actress	Fathmath Neelam	Nominated	
4th Gaumee Film Awards	Best Score	Ayyuman Shareef	Won	
4th Gaumee Film Awards	Best Sound Editing	Mohamed Amsad	Won	
