= Shifa Thaufeeq =

Maldivian female singer

Shifa Thowfyq
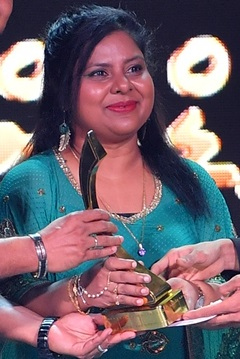
- Thaufeeq at 9th Gaumee Film Awards ceremony, 2019
- Born: 11 July 1970 (age 55); Male', Maldives
- Occupation: Playback singer
- Years active: 1986–present
- Musical career
- Genres: Pop; filmi; electronic
- Instrument: Vocals

Shifa Thowfyq commonly spelled as Shifa Thaufeeq (11 July 1970) is a Maldivian singer and a recipient of five Gaumee Film Awards, three Aafathis Awards, one Maldives Film Award. She holds the record of maximum number of awards as a playback singer in Maldives.

== Early life and career ==
Shifa Thaufeeq was born on 11 July 1970. She is the sister of notable local playback singers Sofa Thaufeeq and Asim Thaufeeq. Influenced by her brother and sister, Thaufeeq started singing at a very early age. In 1986, she initiated her career as a singer which resulted in her receiving several offers from music directors and producers to sing for their films and albums.

In an interview from Avas, Ahmed Hameed Adam commended her excellence for being relevant in the industry for more than three decades and praised her experience and quality. "The most awarded singer in the industry, Shifa is one of those few singers who still gets more offer than the current generation and can still sound young at this age". Ahmed Adhushan from Mihaaru placed her in the top five female vocalists of Maldives and noted that she holds the record of most awards for a singer and most recordings in the local industry.

== Discography ==
=== Feature film ===
Year	Film	Song	Lyricist(s)	Co-artist(s)	Notes
1992	Loabi Veveynee Furaana Dheegen	"Raahathu Mirey Kuruvaifiyey"		Hussain Rasheed	
1995	Masthu	"Aavaaney Naa"		Solo	
1995	Dhehithehge Loabi	"Ruhi Kuramey Aadhey"	Ahmed Sharumeel	Umar Zahir	
1995	Dhehithehge Loabi	"Loabi Mooney"	Ahmed Sharumeel	Umar Zahir	
1995	Dhehithehge Loabi	"Uff Kalaa Han'dhaanvumun"	Ahmed Sharumeel	Solo	Appears in Soundtrack album
1996	Lheedharifulhu	"Reyrey Kuri Dhauru Neyngeythee"		Solo	
1996	Lheedharifulhu	"Dhen Othee Hoadhumey"	Easa Shareef	Mohamed Rashad	
1996	Lheedharifulhu	"Loabi Dheyneyey Araam"		Ali Rameez	
1996	Lheedharifulhu	"Uff Kalaa Han'dhaanvumun"	Ahmed Sharumeel	Solo	
1996	Badhal	"Ekani Vaneeye Adhi Fenifa Rovey"	Hussain Sobah	Hussain Sobah	
1996	Badhal	"Adhi Heelaa Adhi Dheyshey Kiyaa"	Hussain Sobah	Hussain Sobah	
1996	Fun Asaru	"Neyngi Hithey Gendheveema Loabin"	Easa Shareef	Ali Rameez	
1996	Fun Asaru	"Miljulvey Loabi Neyngunuthaaey"	Ahmed Sharumeel	Aasim Thaufeeq	
1996	Fun Asaru	"Ufaa Dhin Jaadhuvee Reyrey" (Sad Version)	Fathimath Nahula	Solo	
1996	Huras	"Meygaa Rihumeh Vaathee"	Jaufar Abdul Rahuman	Solo	
1997	Loabeega Aniyaa	"Saahibaa"	Hussain Sobah	Abdul Hannan Moosa Didi	
1997	Loabeega Aniyaa	"Thiya Nan Kiyaa Hoadhey"	Hussain Sobah	Ahmed Rasheedh	
1997	Loabeega Aniyaa	"Reyrey Mithuraa"	Tharaboozu Ahmed Riza	Mohamed Rashad	
1997	Diary	"Dheyneehey Sazaa Loabivaa"	Ahmed Sharumeel	Solo	
1997	Diary	"Yaaraa Ulheyney Foruvan"	Ahmed Sharumeel	Abdul Hannan Moosa Didi	
1997	Fathis Handhuvaru	"Boa Vehey Vaareya"	Easa Shareef	Abdul Hannan Moosa Didi	
1997	Fathis Handhuvaru	"Kaakuthoa Bunedheyshey"	Easa Shareef	Abdul Hannan Moosa Didi	Appears in Soundtrack album
1997	Fathis Handhuvaru	"Iquraaru Kurume Molhuvaanee"	Easa Shareef	Solo	Appears in Soundtrack album
1997	Laila	"Moonu Thee Han'dhunama"	Fathimath Nahula	Ali Rameez	Appears in Soundtrack album
1998	Ethoofaaneerey	"Thilolun Saafuvee"	Easa Shareef	Abdul Hannan Moosa Didi	
1998	Ethoofaaneerey	"Nifasha, I Love You"	Ahmed Haleem	Ali Rameez	
1998	Fahuneyvaa	"Hin'gaashey Hin'gaashey"	Fathimath Nahula	Mukhthar Adam	
1998	Fahuneyvaa	"Dhevilaagan'du Jehi Fithuneemaa"	Easa Shareef	Umar Zahir	
1998	Fahuneyvaa	"Thikhiyaalugaa Thikhiyaalugaa"	Ahmed Haleem	Ali Rameez	
1998	Sirru	"Feninulaa Loabivethi Mithuraa"	Ahmed Sharumeel	Umar Zahir	
1998	Amaanaaiy	"Thuhthu Moonaa Dheloa" (Female Version)	Ahmed Sharumeel	Solo	
1998	Mila Handhuvaru	"Dhen Othee Hoadhumey"	Easa Shareef	Mohamed Rashad	
1999	Qurbaani	"Heylaa Hunnanveemaa Maafkurey Yaaraa"	Easa Shareef	Abdul Hannan Moosa Didi	
1999	Leykokaa	"Maafkuraashey Mi Beyzaaru"	Easa Shareef	Mukhthar Adam	
1999	Leykokaa	"Mithuraa Feneythoa Hureemey Mithaan'gaa"		Umar Zahir	
2000	Ainbehge Loabi Firiehge Vaajib	"Vaareyaa Themi Foaveema"	Easa Shareef	Umar Zahir	
2000	Ainbehge Loabi Firiehge Vaajib	"Veynugaa Kuramey Dhuaa" (Female Version)	Ahmed Sharumeel	Solo	
2000	Ainbehge Loabi Firiehge Vaajib	"Muniyaa" (Slow Version)	Ahmed Sharumeel	Solo	
2000	Ainbehge Loabi Firiehge Vaajib	"Jismu Hibain Dhinee"	Ahmed Sharumeel	Mohamed Huzam	
2000	Maazee	"Dhirihureemey Mithaa"	Boi Ahmed Khaleel	Abdul Hannan Moosa Didi	
2000	Majubooru Loabi	"Neyvaage Therein"		Umar Zahir	
2000	Majubooru Loabi	"Bune Anga Anga"		Mukhthar Adam	
2000	Majubooru Loabi	"Mithuraaey Furusatheh" (Slow Version)	Adam Haleem Adnan	Solo	
2000	Rihun	"Dheynan Jaanaa Hithaa"	Hussain Shihab	Solo	
2000	Rihun	"Ehan'dhaan Iyaadha Kuramaa"	Hussain Shihab	Solo	
2000	Rihun	"Aashiqaa Edhemey Ahaa"	Hussain Shihab	Umar Zahir	
2000	Rihun	"Vaanehey Loabi Vazan"	Hussain Shihab	Umar Zahir	
2000	Rihun	"Aadheyhey Kuraa Mee Hithun"	Hussain Shihab	Umar Zahir	
2001	Aaah	"Oagaavee Heyo Hithakun"		Mohamed Huzam	
2001	Hilihilaa	"Gaathuga Hurumun"	Mohamed Huzam	Mohamed Huzam	
2001	Hiiy Edhenee	"Fennaane Jehunu Bika Haal"	Easa Shareef	Solo	Appears in Soundtrack album
2001	Hiyy Heyokuraathi	"Fun Vindhaa Mulhi Hithugaa"	Ahmed Haleem	Muaviyath Anwar	
2001	Hiyy Heyokuraathi	"Ahaashey Zuvaanaa"	Ahmed Haleem	Muaviyath Anwar	
2002	Kahvalhah Dhaandhen	"Abadhu Thiya Loabi"	Shifa Thaufeeq	Ali Rameez	
2002	Kahvalhah Dhaandhen	"Loabivaa Mee Hithey" (Female Version)	Ahmed Sharumeel	Solo	
2002	Sandhuravirey	"Vindhey Thee Hin'gaa Kiyanhey"	Ahmed Haleem	Muaviyath Anwar	
2002	Sandhuravirey	"Vevey Loabi Kiyaaladheyn"	Ahmed Haleem	Ali Rameez	
2002	Sandhuravirey	"Mirey Ishqugaa Kuruvaa"	Ahmed Haleem	Ali Rameez	
2002	Sandhuravirey	"Inthihaavee Khiyaal Thakehgaa"		Hassan Ilham	Appears in Soundtrack album
2002	Sandhuravirey	"Kuri Ishquge Mee Thaareefu Dhulun"	Adam Haleem Adnan	Hassan Ilham	Appears in Soundtrack album
2002	Sandhuravirey	"Heyluvaalee Roohaa Shabaabey"	Adam Haleem Adnan	Abdul Baaree	Appears in Soundtrack album
2003	Ginihila	"Fun Asarugaa Mihiyy"	Easa Shareef	Ali Rameez	
2003	Ginihila	"Loaiybakee Haadhahaa Fun Asarekey"	Easa Shareef	Solo	
2003	Kalaayaanulaa	"Nukerifa Nuhurey Aadhey"	Mausoom Shakir	Abdul Baaree	
2003	Kalaayaanulaa	"I Love You"	Mausoom Shakir	Hassan Ilham	
2003	Dhonkamana	"Ahaashey Loabivaaey Ahaashey"	Adam Naseer Ibrahim	Abdul Baaree	
2003	Dhonkamana	"Dheyn Ufaavaaney"	Adam Haleem Adnan	Mukhthar Adam	
2003	Dhonkamana	"Thiya Khiyaal Foheleveyhey?"	Easa Shareef	Abdul Hannan Moosa Didi	
2003	Edhi Edhi Hoadheemey	Ossifaavaa Iru Eree Ey"	Kopee Mohamed Rasheedh	Abdul Hannan Moosa Didi	
2003	Edhi Edhi Hoadheemey	"Edhi Edhi Hoadheemey" (Version 1)	Kopee Mohamed Rasheedh	Ali Rameez	
2003	Edhi Edhi Hoadheemey	"Edhi Edhi Hoadheemey" (Version 2)	Kopee Mohamed Rasheedh	Hassan Ilham	Appears in Soundtrack album
2003	Vehey Vaarey Therein	"Nan Bunan Kereynehey?"	Easa Shareef	Abdul Baaree	
2003	Vehey Vaarey Therein	"Alhe Alhe Dhoonukurey"	Easa Shareef	Abdul Baaree	Appears in Soundtrack album
2004	Hatharu Udhares	"Vefaa Othee Dhen Kon Kushehbaaey?"	Easa Shareef	Abdul Hannan Moosa Didi	
2004	Dharinnahtakai	"Dhaan Hin'gaa"	Ahmed Nashidh (Dharavandhoo)	Ibrahim Rameez	
2004	Sandhuravirey 2	"Masthee Dhehiyy"	Ahmed Haleem	Abdul Baaree	
2004	Sandhuravirey 2	"Magey Jaaney Thee"	Ahmed Haleem	Mukhthar Adam	
2004	Sandhuravirey 2	"Sandhuravirey Vaudhey Kuraa Mee"	Ahmed Haleem	Mukhthar Adam	
2004	Edhathuru	"Gaiy Biru Gayaa"	Ahmed Nashidh (Dharavandhoo)	Solo	
2004	Edhathuru	"Vaadhera Nethi Dhaaneythoa"	Ahmed Nashidh (Dharavandhoo)	Ali Abdulla (Komandoo)	
2004	Edhathuru	"Hiyy Edhey Varun"	Ahmed Shakeeb	Mohamed Fazeel	
2004	Edhathuru	"Behidhaaneyey Loabeegaa Oyaa"	Kaneeru Abdul Raheem	Hassan Ilham	
2005	Handhu Keytha	"Thi Farudhaa Nagaashey"		Abdul Baaree	
2005	Handhu Keytha	"Libeythee Ufaa Migothah"		Hassan Ilham	
2005	Handhu Keytha	"Loabi Ummeedhu Dhinhaa"	Easa Shareef	Solo	
2005	Zuleykha	"Haadha Loaiybey Dhoa"	Mausoom Shakir	Solo	
2005	Hureemey Inthizaarugaa	"Miadhu Ulhunas Mithaa"	Easa Shareef	Mukhthar Adam	
2005	Hureemey Inthizaarugaa	"Hiyy Furaadhey"	Easa Shareef	Mukhthar Adam	
2005	Hureemey Inthizaarugaa	"Visnaa Visnaa"	Easa Shareef	Abdul Baaree	
2005	Hureemey Inthizaarugaa	"Ma Dhuru Nuvaanan"	Easa Shareef	Mohamed Abdul Ghanee	
2006	Vaaloabi Engeynama	"Jaadhooga Dheewanaa Hiyy Vey"	Mohamed Abdul Ghanee	Mohamed Abdul Ghanee	
2006	Vaaloabi Engeynama	"Annaashey Annaashey"	Mohamed Abdul Ghanee	Solo	
2008	Yoosuf	"Ushaa"	Adam Haleem Adnan	Hassan Ilham	
2009	Karuna Vee Beyvafa	"Dheynuhe Loabi Edhey"		Umar Zahir	
2009	E Dharifulhu	"Libunas Ufaa Veemey Baakeevefaa"	Mohamed Abdul Ghanee	Mohamed Abdul Ghanee	
2009	Baaraige Fas	"Thiloabi Noon Loaiybakah"	Ahmed Nashidh (Dharavandhoo)	Abdul Baaree	
2009	Loaiybahtakaa	"Abadhuves Feneyey Kalaa"	Ahmed Nashidh (Dharavandhoo)	Hassan Ilham	
2010	Jinni	"Roveyhaaveyey"	Mohamed Abdul Ghanee	Mohamed Abdul Ghanee	
2010	Maafeh Neiy	"Hiyy Furi Loameri Dhaahaavey"	Mohamed Abdul Ghanee	Umar Zahir	
2010	Maafeh Neiy	"Mammage Ran Dhoonyaa Nidhaalaashey"	Mohamed Abdul Ghanee	Solo	
2010	Zalzalaa En'buri Aun	"Aadhey Araamu Dheynamey"	Mohamed Abdul Ghanee	Solo	
2010	Fanaa	"Fanaa" (Theme Song)	Ahmed Nashidh (Dharavandhoo)	Solo	
2011	Hiyy Vindhaa Nulaa	"Dharifulhaa Nidhaalaashey" (Female Version)	Shifa Thaufeeq	Solo	
2011	Hiyy Vindhaa Nulaa	"Vaudhaa Huvaa Mee Kuraa"	Shifa Thaufeeq	Hassan Ilham	
2011	Hiyy Vindhaa Nulaa	"Vaudhaa Huvaa Mee Kuraa" (Sad Version)	Shifa Thaufeeq	Hassan Ilham	
2011	Hiyy Vindhaa Nulaa	"Moosun Nalae Reehchey Kalaa"	Shifa Thaufeeq	Hassan Ilham	
2011	Hiyy Vindhaa Nulaa	"Meehe Ebunaa Loaiybakee?"	Shifa Thaufeeq	Hassan Ilham	
2011	Hafaaraiy	"Kuran Gandhee Huvaa"	Easa Shareef	Hassan Ilham	
2011	Hafaaraiy	"Finiveye Hiyy"	Easa Shareef	Mohamed Abdul Ghanee	
2011	Hafaaraiy	"Hafaraaiy Hafaraaiy"		Mohamed Abdul Ghanee	
2011	Hafaaraiy	"Dhon Dhon Mooney Thee Nayaa"		Solo	
2011	Hafaaraiy	"Thiyaee Finikan		Hassan Jalaal	Appears in Soundtrack album
2011	Zaharu	"Moosumey Mee"	Mohamed Zaheen	Umar Zahir	
2011	Zaharu	"Lah La La Laa"	Ismail Mubarik	Hassan Ilham, Aminath Sidhana	
2011	Kuhveriakee Kaakuhey?	"Aharenves Loabivin"	Abdul Hannan Moosa Didi	Abdul Hannan Moosa Didi	
2011	14 Vileyrey	"Loabeegaa" (Female Version)	Mohamed Abdul Ghanee	Solo	
2011	14 Vileyrey	"Ossey Han'dhey"	Ismail Mubarik	Hassan Ilham	
2011	Laelaa	"Fari Nala Thibaage Soora Dhen"		Abdul Baaree	
2011	Laelaa	"Naseebuge Aee Ranzamaaney Ujaalaa"		Hassan Jalaal	
2011	Hiyy Yaara Dheefa	"Dhiriulhun Fasleveythan Fenumun Magey"	Mohamed Abdul Ghanee	Solo	
2011	Hiyy Yaara Dheefa	"Aadhey Loabivaa"	Mohamed Abdul Ghanee	Mukhthar Adam	Appears in Soundtrack album
2013	Fathis Handhuvaruge Feshun 3D	"Edhemey Kalaayah Inthihaa" (Female Version)	Shifa Thaufeeq	Solo	
2013	Fathis Handhuvaruge Feshun 3D	"Zuvaanaa Thiya Nan Hithugaa"	Shifa Thaufeeq	Solo	
2013	Fathis Handhuvaruge Feshun 3D	"Vamey Fun Khiyaaluthakugaa"	Ismail Mubarik	Mohamed Abdul Ghanee	
2014	Aniyaa	"Hiyy Meygaa Mi Bunaneebaaey?"	Ismail Mubarik	Hassan Ilham	
2017	Malikaa	"Hiyy Magey Dhevijjey"	Fathuhulla Abdul Fahthah (Fatho)	Ibrahim Mamdhooh (Mandey)	
2017	Naughty 40	"Nala Nala Insaanaa"	Adam Haleem Adnan	Hassan Ilham	
2019	Kos Gina Mistake	"Fari Kan'bulo"		Hassan Ilham	
2020	Andhirikan	"Kiyaa Miee Loabi Hey?"	Mohamed Abdul Ghanee	Aleef Ali	
2024	Udhabaani 2	"Thiya Ey Thiya Ey Nufili Han'dhaaney"	Ahmed Nashid	Ibrahim Zaid Ali	

=== Short films ===
Year	Film	Song	Lyricist(s)	Co-artist(s)
2006	Ereyge Fahun	"Mi Aalam Thereygaa"		Solo
2007	Nudhaashe Dhookohfaa Loabivaa	"Nudhaashe Dhookohfaa Loabivaa" (Theme Song)	Shifa Thaufeeq	Solo
2008	Noonekey Nubunaashey	"Insaanakeemey Veyn Libifaavaa"		Solo
2009	Aharennah Loabi Nuvevununama	"Loabin Heelaa Kalaa"	Shifa Thaufeeq	Ibrahim Zaid Ali
2010	Nu Ufan Dhari	"Nu Ufan Dhari (Theme Song)	Shifa Thaufeeq	Ibrahim Shahin

=== Television ===
Year	Title	Song	Lyricist(s)	Co-artist(s)
N/A	Fithuna (Teledrama)	"Thiya Dhin Ufaa"		Ahmed Aathif
1993	Dhen Keehkuraanee?	"Kalaage Loabi Libeythoa Hureeme Dhuniyeygaa"	Easa Shareef	Abdulla Waheedh (Feeali)
1996	Malakaa	"Hithaaey Thiya Hiyy Edhey"	Ahmed Sharumeel	Hussain Rasheedh
1996	Badhunaam	"Fenifame Kohfi Asaru"	Mausoom Shakir	Aasim Thaufeeq
1997	Kahthiri	"Mee Himeyn Dhanvaru"	Easa Shareef	Abdul Hannan Moosa Didi
1998	Kulheybeybe	"Mihiyy Ekee Fanaavanee"	Fathimath Nahula	Abdul Hannan Moosa Didi
1998	Kekulhun (Teledrama)	"Kaaku Dhekeynee Haal"	Moomina Rasheed	Umar Zahir
1999	Thadhu Thedhu Huvafen	"Hiyy Dheewaanaa"	Kopee Mohamed Rasheedh	Abdul Hannan Moosa Didi
2000	Dhoapatta	"Hoadhumah Dhaanan Ey Bala Malaa"	Easa Shareef	Mukhthar Adam
2000	Dhoapatta	"Veyn Libeythee Ey"	Ahmed Shakeeb	Mohamed Huzam
2000	Dhoapatta	"Hadhiyaa Badhal Vanee Ey"	Kopee Mohamed Rasheedh	Abdul Baaree
2002	Fahu Fiyavalhu	"Masthuvejjey Fenifaa Mithuraa"	Jaufar Abdul Rahuman	Ahmed Aathif
2002	Saadhaa (Teledrama)	"Nukulhedhey Haalugaa"	Adam Haleem Adnan	Muaviyath Anwar
2003	Dheewaanaa (Teledrama)	"Ummeedhu Aavefaa Vanee"	Kopee Mohamed Rasheedh	Abdul Hannan Moosa Didi
2003	Ruheveynee Kon Hithakun?	"Fun Araamu Numedhee Dhiyaimaa"		Solo
2003	Hiyy Edhey Raasthaa	"Yaaru Thiyey Mihithuge Shifaa"	Adam Haleem Adhnan	Ali Rameez
2003	Kan'bulo (Teledrama)	"Udhaasvey Mihiyy"	Adam Haleem Adhnan	Solo
2003	Raiy Finifenmaa	"Beynun Asaru Dheynuhey"	Adam Naseer Ibrahim	Ali Rameez
2003	Thiyey Mihithuge Vindhakee	"Nindheveethee Meymathee" (Female Version)	Ahmed Shakeeb	Solo
2004	Dhanmaanu	"Gulzaarakee Thiyey"		Abdul Baaree
2004	Loabi Nulibunas	"Loabi Nulibunas" (Theme Song)	Adam Naseer Ibrahim	Solo
2004	Loabi Nulibunas	"Veynaa Rihun Meygaa Vanee"	Adam Naseer Ibrahim	Solo
2004	Loabi Nulibunas	"Loabeege Jaadhooeh Fadhain"	Adam Naseer Ibrahim	Muaviyath Anwar
2004	Loabi Nulibunas	"Chaaloo Thuhthu Dhon Moonakee Thiyey"	Adam Haleem Adnan	Solo
2005	Baiveriyaa	"Baiveriyaa Kuramey Handhaan"		Solo
2005-2006	Vairoalhi Ahves Sirrun	"Eyrugaa Ufaa"	Ahmed Haleem	Solo
2006	Kuramey Vadhaaee Salaam	"Loabin Kalaa Kaireegaa Vaanamey"	Mohamed Abdul Ghanee	Mukhthar Adam
2006	Kuramey Vadhaaee Salaam	"Dhookoh Nudhey Kaireegaa Vey Magey"	Mohamed Abdul Ghanee	Mukhthar Adam
2006	Yaaraanulaa	"Yaaraanulaa Yaaraanulaa"		Mukhthar Adam
2008	Umurah Ekee Ulhen Bunefaa	"Umurah Ekee Ulhen Bunefaa" (Theme Song)		Solo
2010	Sirrun Hithaa Kulhelaafa	"Sirrun Hithaa Kulhelaafa" (Theme Song)		Solo
2010	Thiya Loabeegai Abadhahme Vaanamey	"Thiya Loabeegaa Abadhahme Vaanamey" (Theme Song)		Solo
2010	Magey Hithakee Hitheh Noon Hey?	"Mi Dhefai Olhi Varu Nethidhaaney"	Ahmed Haleem	Solo
2010	Magey Hithakee Hitheh Noon Hey?	"Hunnanveehey Heylaa"		Solo

=== Non-film songs ===
Year	Album / Single	Song	Lyricist(s)	Co-artist(s)
1989	Galaxyge Therein	"Chaandhanee Maley"		Hussain Rasheedh
1989	Galaxyge Therein	"Eki Raagu Ivvaadheythee Ey"		Imaadh Ismail
1990	Maaburaa Kokaa	"Moosumey Mee"	Mohamed Zaheen	Mohamed Zaheen
1990	Maaburaa Kokaa	"Raahathu Mirey Kuruvaifiyey"		Hussain Rasheedh
1990	Maaburaa Kokaa	"Gaimey Thadhaa Veyn Libey"		Massoodh Moosa Didi
1990	Maaburaa Kokaa	"Fun Han'dhaaney"		Solo
1992	Telethone '92	"Aashiqaa Ey Bune Aashiq"		Solo
1993	Saalhan'ga	"Dhilley Noorey Kiyaa Dhilley Nayaa"		Solo
1993	Saalhan'ga	"Kalaage Loabi Libeythoa"	Easa Shareef	Feeali Abdulla Waheedh
1994	Addana	"Beynumeehey Bunan"		Fenthashi Mohamed Khaleel
1994	Addana	"Ehaa Maadhurunney"		Solo
1994	Addana	"Hekivaashe Mee"		Solo
1994	Addana	"Hithaa Ey Thiya Hiyy Edhey"	Ahmed Sharumeel	Ali Moosa
1994	Beywafaa	"Dheynanhey Hithuge Maqaam"	Easa Shareef	Hussain Rasheedh
1994	Beywafaa	"Fenifayey Balan Mihuree"	Easa Shareef	Abdul Hannan Moosa Didi
1994	Beywafaa	"Han'dhaan Nufileemaa"		Fenthashi Mohamed Khaleel
1994	Beywafaa	"Hoonekey Mee Zuvaanaa"		Solo
1994	Beywafaa	"Veynaai Badhunaseebuhey"		Solo
1994	Loodhifaa	"Reyrey Kurevey Mee Araam"	Easa Shareef	Umar Zahir
1994	Loodhifaa	"Thihira Gothakun Balaa"	Easa Shareef	Umar Zahir
1994	Loodhifaa	"Thoathoa Eynaa Ey Libeythoa"	Kaneeru Abdul Raheem	Umar Zahir
1994	Loodhifaa	"Filamun Nudhaaneythee"	Kaneeru Abdul Raheem	Umar Zahir
1994	Loodhifaa	"Dhin Thadhaa Veynakee Eyrugaa"	Kaneeru Abdul Raheem	Solo
1994	Loodhifaa	"Enme Veyn Dheynmethoa"	Kaneeru Abdul Raheem	Solo
1994	Kasab	"Niyanethi Moorithi Lhadhareenney"	Fenthashi Mohamed Khaleel	Fenthashi Mohamed Khaleel
1994	Kasab	"Loabin Thihen Naghumaa Kiyaa"	Fenthashi Mohamed Khaleel	Fenthashi Mohamed Khaleel
1994	Kasab	"Khiyaalee Shuooru"	Fenthashi Mohamed Khaleel	Fenthashi Mohamed Khaleel
1994	Udhaas	"Loabi Dheyneyey Araam"		Ali Rameez
1995	Dhassoora	"Badhal Vaanehey"	Fathimath Nahula	Muaviyath Anwar
1995	Dhassoora	"Hoadheneeye Hoadhenee"	Fathimath Nahula	Abdul Hannan Moosa Didi
1995	Dhassoora	"Kalaa Huvaakoh Thihen Bunaaney"	Fathimath Nahula	Abdul Hannan Moosa Didi
1995	Dhassoora	"Vindhu Jahaathee Kiyaadhemey"	Fathimath Nahula	Abdul Hannan Moosa Didi
1995	Dhassoora	"Keiymadhuvaneeyey Dhiwaanaa"	Fathimath Nahula	Solo
1995	Gagunas	"Kaireegaa Viyas"	Kopee Mohamed Rasheedh	Abdul Hannan Moosa Didi
1995	Gagunas	"Vumun Beywafaa"	Kopee Mohamed Rasheedh	Abdul Hannan Moosa Didi
1995	Han'dhaan	"Milkuve Hiyy Hithaa"		Solo
1995	Han'dhaan	"Aadheyhey, Aadheyhey Ahaa"		Solo
1995	Ranhaaru	"Fenifame Kohfi Asaru"	Mausoom Shakir	Asim Thaufeeq
1995	Ranhaaru	"Fenuneemaa Beley"	Mausoom Shakir	Asim Thaufeeq
1995	Falivalhu	"Mihiyy Ekee Fanaavanee"	Fathimath Nahula	Abdul Hannan Moosa Didi
1995	Falivalhu	"Dheefaa Thi Loabi Faalhukurey"	Fathimath Nahula	Abdul Hannan Moosa Didi
1995	Thaubeeru	"Reyrey Kuri Dhauru"		Solo
1995	Thaubeeru	"Eynaa Edhenee Fennan Gennan"	Easa Shareef	Solo
1995	Thaubeeru	"Dhen Othee Hoadhumey"	Easa Shareef	Mohamed Rashad
1995	Thaubeeru	"Faalhuga Hiyy Mi Dhenee"	Easa Shareef	Abdul Hannan Moosa Didi
1995	Dhanvaru	"Hithugaa Malee Zavaajee"		Solo
1995	Dhanvaru	"Edhey Mooney Muhabbathugaa"		Umar Zahir
1995	Dhanvaru	"Nudhaashe Loabeegaa Fikuru"		Abdul Hannan Moosa Didi
1996	Fashuvi	"Fenilee Gothun Thedhey"	Ahmed Sharumeel	Ibrahim Amir
1996	Fashuvi	"Bunebala Dhen Mey Thelhilaa"	Afeefa	Ali Rameez
1996	Goanaa	"Neyngeyey Nan Ivenee"	Hussain Sobah	Hussain Sobah
1996	Goanaa	"Loabin Mi Vaavaru"	Hussain Sobah	Hussain Sobah
1996	Goanaa	"Thiya Nan Kiyaa Hoadhey"	Hussain Sobah	Ahmed Rasheedh
1996	Goanaa	"Saahibaa"	Hussain Sobah	Abdul Hannan Moosa Didi
1996	Goanaa	"Ey Naa Goanaa"		Solo
1996	Haadhisaa	"Hama Dhenme Kalaa"	Ahmed Haleem	Umar Zahir
1996	Haadhisaa	"Edhey Moonakeehey"	Ahmed Sharumeel	Umar Zahir
1996	Itthifaaq	"Miljulvey Loabi Neyngunthaa Ey"	Ahmed Sharumeel	Asim Thaufeeq
1996	Koveli	"Aavaa Usoolu Funkoh"	Ahmed Sharumeel	Solo
1996	Koveli	"Loabin Ehaa Ulheynee"	Ahmed Sharumeel	Solo
1996	Koveli	"Dhinhaa Han'dhaanugaa Vanee"	Ahmed Sharumeel	Solo
1996	Koveli	"Loabi Ehaavaa Hoadhi E Hithakun"	Ahmed Sharumeel	Solo
1996	Koveli	"Dhanvaru Dhan"	Ahmed Sharumeel	Solo
1996	Koveli	"Vaaeygaa Vaaeygaa"	Ahmed Sharumeel	Solo
1996	Koveli	"Sayonaaraa Sayonaaraa"	Ahmed Sharumeel	Solo
1996	Koveli	"Bunedheyshey Heelaa Veevaru"	Ahmed Sharumeel	Solo
1996	Koveli	"Dhaashey, Thiya Beli Farikan"	Ahmed Sharumeel	Solo
1996	Koveli	"Dheyshey Fashaa Loabin"	Ahmed Sharumeel	Solo
1996	Maayoos	"Thee Ey Magey Wafaatherivi Raanee"	Ahmed Shakeeb	Abdul Hannan Moosa Didi
1996	Misraab	"Hithuga E Loabin Vikaafaa"	Easa Shareef	Abdul Hannan Moosa Didi
1996	Misraab	"Thunfathaa Moonaa Lolaa"	Easa Shareef	Abdul Hannan Moosa Didi
1996	Sahaaraa	"Furi Loa Dhanee"	Easa Shareef	Abdul Hannan Moosa Didi
1996	Sahaaraa	"Neyngi Hithey Gendheveema"	Easa Shareef	Ali Rameez
1996	Shakuvaa	"Veeyey Fanaa"	Ahmed Shakeeb	Solo
1997	Alivilun	"Hifaa Hiyy Loabin Vanee"	Fathimath Nahula	Abdul Hannan Moosa Didi
1997	Alivilun	"Loa Maraalaafa Han'dhey"	Easa Shareef	Feeali Abdulla Waheedh
1997	Alivilun	"Thi Khiyaaluga Ey Rovenee"	Easa Shareef	Solo
1997	Dhunfini	"Thiya Nan Kiyaa Hoadhey"	Hussain Sobah	Ahmed Rasheedh
1997	Dhunfini	"Eku Ulhefaa Vakiveemaa"		Abdulla Waheedh (Waddey)
1997	Dhunfini	"Ey Vevigen Khiyaalugaa Dheewaanaa"		Solo
1997	Dhunfini	"Aadhey Ladhun Nuhurey"		Solo
1997	Eheege Adu	"Hairaan Veehey"	Easa Shareef	Ahmed Nimal
1997	Faruwaa	"Aanan Baavaaney"	Kopee Mohamed Rasheedh	Umar Zahir
1997	Faruwaa	"Dhey Lafuzun Heelaa"	Ahmed Haleem	Umar Zahir
1997	Faruwaa	"Faruvaadhee Faruvaadhee"	Ahmed Haleem	Abdul Hannan Moosa Didi
1997	Faruwaa	"Ufaa Libi Dhaneethaa"	Ahmed Haleem	Abdul Hannan Moosa Didi
1997	Faruwaa	"Meygaa Meygaa Mihithey Thelhenee"	Ahmed Haleem	Solo
1997	Faruwaa	"Kaakuhey Bunan Huree"	Easa Shareef	Solo
1997	Faruwaa	"An'buraa Alun Nulevey Varu"		Solo
1997	Faruwaa	"Zuvaan Leyge Hoonaa"		Solo
1997	Faruwaa	"Fennaathee Dheken Dhaahiyy Vee"		Mohamed Shahuban
1997	Faruwaa	"Fikuraa Khiyaalaa Seedhaavey"		Mohamed Rashad
1997	Haadhisaa 2	"Kollee Hithaahe Samaasaa"	Ahmed Haleem	Umar Zahir
1997	Haadhisaa 2	"Vaaloabi Aalaa"	Ahmed Sharumeel	Umar Zahir
1997	Huvan'dhu	"Dhin Khiyaalu Khiyaalu Theehey"		Ali Rameez
1997	Huvan'dhu	"Dheewaanaa Dheewaanaa"		Mohamed Shahuban
1997	Huvan'dhu	"Aiylevidhaane Thihaavaru Veemaa"	Mausoom Shakir	Abdul Rasheedh (Absy)
1997	Kurunees	"Heekaruvaathee Hurevey Dhoa"	Easa Shareef	Umar Zahir
1997	Kurunees	"Vaareyaa Themi Foaveemaa"	Easa Shareef	Umar Zahir
1997	Kurunees	"Karunuge Ohey"	Easa Shareef	Solo
1997	Lailaa	"Moonu Thee Han'dhunama"	Fathimath Nahula	Ali Rameez
1997	Raahi	"Beynunvaa Khiyaalu Bunedheyshey"	Kopee Mohamed Rasheedh	Abdul Hannan Moosa Didi
1997	Raahi	"Hayaathun Mi Maamui"	Kopee Mohamed Rasheedh	Abdul Hannan Moosa Didi
1997	Raalhu	"Goanaa Mihithah Nukuraashey"	Tharaboozu Ahmed Riza	Stepin Ali Rasheedh
1997	Raalhu	"Khiyaaru Kuraa Ithubaaru Kuraashey"	Tharaboozu Ahmed Riza	Umar Zahir
1997	Raalhu	"Dheloa Vanee Mammaa Ey"	Tharaboozu Ahmed Riza	Abdul Hannan Moosa Didi
1997	Raalhu	"Moonu Thee Han'dhunama" (Bonus Song)	Fathimath Nahula	Ali Rameez
1997	Shabaab	"Hiyy Edheyhen Hithuge Inthizaaru"	Ahmed Shakeeb	Solo
1997	Thasveeru	"Roomee, I Love You"		Umar Zahir
1997	Thasveeru	"Evaarey Fineegaa"		Muaviyath Anwar
1997	Xth	"Maakan'duge Medhutherey"		Mezzo Mohamed Majidh
1998	Aawaaraa	"Aawaaraa Veema Dhe Jaan"		Solo
1998	Aawaaraa	"Heelanveehey Asarugaa Roanveehey"		Solo
1998	Aawaaraa	"Ladhun Nudhaashey"		Solo
1998	Aawaaraa	"Nulibeythee Ufaa Loabin"		Solo
1998	Aawaaraa	"Koadi Bala Dhen Kan'daa" (Eid Song)		Ayyuman Shareef
1998	Aawaaraa	"Aniyaa Ey Loabeegaa"		Ayyuman Shareef
1998	Aawaaraa	"Asthaa Geyah Dhaanvee Ey"	Easa Shareef	Abdul Hannan Moosa Didi
1998	Aawaaraa	"Bune Anga Angaa"		Mukhthar Adam
1998	Aawaaraa	"Neyngivaa Baarakun"		Mukhthar Adam
1998	Aawaaraa	"Oagaavee Heyo Hithakun"		Mohamed Huzam
1998	Aawaaraa	"Kiyaadheebalaashey"	Shifa Thaufeeq	Umar Zahir
1998	Aawaaraa	"Visnaanulaa Kuri Inthizaaru"	Boi Ahmed Khaleel	Umar Zahir
1998	Arutha	"Han'dhaan Aaveveythee"		Mukhthar Adam
1998	Arutha	"Vee Beynwafaa Eynaa"		Umar Zahir
1998	Foni Karuna	"Kuran Hithuleemey"		Umar Zahir
1998	Foni Karuna	"Moosun Badhal Vedhaaney"	Boi Ahmed Khaleel	Abdul Hannan Moosa Didi
1998	Foni Karuna	"Ufaa Dhuniyeyge Imugaa"		Solo
1998	Foni Zaharu	"Thilolun Saafuvee"	Easa Shareef	Abdul Hannan Moosa Didi
1998	Foni Zaharu	"Aahaa Ninjeh Naadhey"	Easa Shareef	Abdul Hannan Moosa Didi
1998	Foni Zaharu	"Shukuriyaa Hama Shukuriyaa"	Easa Shareef	Abdul Hannan Moosa Didi
1998	Hungaanu	"Hithah Dhathi Kuruvi Haaley"		Solo
1998	Hungaanu	"Vaa Jazubaathey Mee Loabin"		Mukhthar Adam
1998	Juhaage Handi	"Mithuraa Dhurugaa Vaan Edhey Iru"	Tharaboozu Ahmed Riza	Solo
1998	Juhaage Handi	"Bala Kulhelaa Migothugaa"	Tharaboozu Ahmed Riza	Abdul Hannan Moosa Didi
1998	Juhaage Handi	"Reyrey Mithuraa" (Bonus Song)	Tharaboozu Ahmed Riza	Mohamed Rashad
1998	Kurikeela	"Alidhanmathi Vejjey Ey Saahibaa"	Kopee Mohamed Rasheedh	Solo
1998	Kurikeela	"Ummeedhu Aavefaa Vanee"	Kopee Mohamed Rasheedh	Abdul Hannan Moosa Didi
1998	Meeraa	"Thin Rey Gayaave Hoadheemey"	Kopee Mohamed Rasheedh	Abdul Hannan Moosa Didi
1998	Meeraa	"Mihiree Mihiree"	Kopee Mohamed Rasheedh	Ibrahim Amir
1998	Randhoadhi	"Nunidhey Mihiyy Thelhey Varun"	Easa Shareef	Umar Zahir
1998	Randhoadhi	"Vee E Iquraaruthah"	Tharaboozu Ahmed Riza	Abdul Hannan Moosa Didi
1998	Redhan	"Abadhu Fenilanvee"	Kopee Mohamed Rasheedh	Solo
1998	Redhan	"Vaaney Kaireegaa"	Kopee Mohamed Rasheedh	Umar Zahir
1998	Redhan	"Fini Reyge Fathihey"	Kopee Mohamed Rasheedh	Umar Zahir
1998	Thaureef	"Heylaa Hunnanveemaa Maafkurey Yaaraa"	Easa Shareef	Abdul Hannan Moosa Didi
1998	Thaureef	"Ekaniveleemaa"	Boi Ahmed Khaleel	Solo
1999	Adhaarasam	"Haalu Bunedhenhey Ma"		Ibrahim Amir
1999	Dhirun	"Neyvaage Therey"		Umar Zahir
1999	Dhirun	"Loabiveemaa Kihineh Vaanee"		Umar Zahir
1999	Dhirun	"Madumadun Hiyy Bunaathee Mihen"	Easa Shareef	Umar Zahir
1999	Dhirun	"Eynaa Veethan Hoadhaidheyshey"	Easa Shareef	Solo
1999	Farumaan	"Faalhuga Nan Bune Eynaa"		Solo
1999	Farumaan	"Erey Loabin Goanaa Kuree"		Solo
1999	Ithaa	"Mihin'dhu Viye Dheewaanaa"		Umar Zahir
1999	Ithaa	"Thee Edhey Hithey"		Mukhthar Adam
1999	Ithaa	"Mee Moosun Dhin Saafu Amaan"		Mukhthar Adam
1999	Kasthoori	"Dheewaanaa, Dheewaanaave Nimeyney"		Hussain Sobah
1999	Kasthoori	"Vaa Dhuru Han'dhaanaa"		Mukhthar Adam
1999	Khiyaal	"Maafkuraashey Mi Beyzaaru"	Easa Shareef	Mukhthar Adam
1999	Khiyaal	"Aslu Haalathu Buneveyhey"	Easa Shareef	Mukhthar Adam
1999	Khiyaal	"Seedhaahey Balanvaaney"		Mukhthar Adam
1999	Mahinooru	"Dhila Hoonekey Aavee"	Kopee Mohamed Rasheedh	Abdul Hannan Moosa Didi
1999	Mahinooru	"Nidheyneyhey Ekaniveemaa"	Kopee Mohamed Rasheedh	Umar Zahir
1999	Malakaa	"Dhinee Zaharu Mithuraa"		Mohamed Huzam
1999	Malakaa	"Nuvaanama Kalaa"	Easa Shareef	Mohamed Huzam
1999	Malakaa	"Hoadhumah Dhaanan"	Easa Shareef	Mukhthar Adam
1999	Malakaa	"Hiyy Edheythee Naseebey Nethee"		Mukhthar Adam
1999	Malakaa	"Mithuraa Feneythoa Hureemey"		Umar Zahir
1999	Muniyaa	"Fun Loabi Dheyshey"		Umar Zahir
1999	Muniyaa	"Hoadhaa Hoadhaa Loa Edheythee Hoadhaa"		Ali Rameez
1999	Raaya	"Hithaa Ey, I Love You"		Umar Zahir
1999	Rahmedhu	"Loa Mee Themey" (Female Version)		Solo
1999	Rahmedhu	"Loabivaa Beynun Hithaa"		Mukhthar Adam
1999	Rukkuri	"Naseebugaa Magey Othee"	Boi Ahmed Khaleel	Solo
1999	Rukkuri	"Haamakuraaneehey Isve Bunaaneehey"	Boi Ahmed Khaleel	Mukhthar Adam
1999	Shikaara	"Veyn Libeythee Ey"	Ahmed Shakeeb	Mohamed Huzam
1999	Shikaara	"Loa Merin Fenifaa Edhigen"	Ahmed Shakeeb	Abdul Baaree
2000	Bolirava	"Aniyaa Vanyaa Hithaa"		Solo
2000	Bulbul	"Seedhaa Saadhaa Hiyy Magey"	Adam Haleem Adhnan	Solo
2000	Endheri	"Badhunaamu Mi Veemaa Loabeegaa"		Solo
2000	Hissaa	"Dhelolun Balaafaathaa Ey Heeleemaa"		Solo
2000	Hissaa	"Hiyy Dhenthoa Yaaru Loa Maraashey"		Solo
2000	Hiyala	"Vairoalhin Dhey Dhauvathugaa"		Umar Zahir
2000	Hiyala	"Veleemaa Reethi Hinithun"		Solo
2000	Inthihaa	"Abadhu Thiya Loabi Kalaa Vaananhey"	Shifa Thaufeeq	Ali Rameez
2000	Inthihaa	"Ihusaaseh Veyhey"	Easa Shareef	Ahmed Athif
2000	Maaburu	"Anna Hin'dhugaa Roalhi Vai"	Adam Haleem Adhnan	Solo
2000	Maaburu	"Loabi Kuri Khiyaal Kobaa"		Solo
2000	Moosum	"Jismu Hibain Dhinee"		Mohamed Huzam
2000	Moosum	"Muniyaa Mammage Dhooni (Slow Version)		Solo
2000	Moosum	"Mithuraa Ey Furusatheh" (Slow Version)	Adam Haleem Adhnan	Umar Zahir
2000	Mujuraa	"Kairivelee Thiya Loaiybah Edheythee"	Adam Haleem Adhnan	Umar Zahir
2000	Mujuraa	"Gendhaashe Ey Vayaa Ey"		Solo
2000	Mujuraa	"Veemaa Beyqaraaru"		Solo
2000	Muraka	"Loabin Hoadhamaahey"		Solo
2000	Muraka	"Veythuvun Edhi Thiya Yaaruge Un'gugaa"	Adam Haleem Adhnan	Abdul Baaree
2000	Namaves	"Loabi Ummeedhu Dhinhaa Fonikamaa"		Solo
2000	Namaves	"Loa Meridhaaney"		Ahmed Nimal
2000	Rivethi	"Dheynuhey Kalaa"	Adam Haleem Adhnan	Abdul Baaree, Mohamed Nasheedh
2000	Rivethi	"Yaaru Thiyey Mihithuge Shifaa"	Adam Haleem Adhnan	Ali Rameez
2000	Rivethi	"Hadhiyaa Badhal Vanee Ey"	Kopee Mohamed Rasheedh	Abdul Baaree
2000	Rukkuri 2	"Kiyaanee Fahe Keekeybaa"	Boi Ahmed Khaleel	Mukhthar Adam
2000	Sahaaraa 2	"Reyge Saadhaa Han'dhey"	Easa Shareef	Muaviyath Anwar
2001	Aimina	"Vaanuhey Seedhaa"	Mohamed Rasheedh (Annaarumaa)	Mukhthar Adam
2001	Aimina	"Dheyshey Hiyy Dheyshey"	Mohamed Rasheedh (Annaarumaa)	Mukhthar Adam
2001	Aimina	"Nidhi Naadhey Feni Thiya Moonu"	Mohamed Rasheedh (Annaarumaa)	Mohamed Manik
2001	Dhalha	"O Magey Raanee"		Mohamed Shahuban
2001	Dhunthari	"Thee Loabi Hithekey"	Ahmed Nashidh (Dharavandhoo)	Hussain Sobah
2001	Gulfaam	"Behidhaane Oyaa"	Easa Shareef	Mukhthar Adam
2001	Gulfaam	"Edhemey Libey Araamu"	Adam Haleem Adhnan	Abdul Baaree
2001	Haasil	"Alun Vaa Han'dhaanaa" (Bonus Song)	Ismail Abdul Qadhir	Solo
2001	Mendhan	"Moodhu Kan'daa Bunedheyshey"	Ahmed Shakeeb	Solo
2001	Nayaa	"Loa Merey Hin'dhugaa Nidheegaa"	Mohamed Musthafa	Solo
2001	Nayaa	"Loabeegaa Ma Dhen Vee Nimidhaanhey"		Abdul Baaree
2001	Nayaa	"Thiya Ey Magey Roohakee" (Duet Version)	Adam Naseer Ibrahim	Mukhthar Adam
2001	Nayaa	"Wafaatherikan Netheemaa"		Mukhthar Adam, Mohamed Nasheedh
2001	Rukkuri 3	"Mi Aalam Thereygaa"		Solo
2001	Rukkuri 3	"Karunaige Agu Netheemaa"	Easa Shareef	Hassan Ilham
2001	Saamaraa	"Ujaalaavi Moonaa Nayaa"		Solo
2001	Saamaraa	"Fenilaa O Fenilaa"		Solo
2001	Shoakh	"Alun Vaa Han'dhaanaa"	Ismail Abdul Qadhir	Solo
2001	Single	"Dhinveynuge Hithaamaigaa"	Abdul Hannan Moosa Didi	Abdul Hannan Moosa Didi
2001	Tharaanaa	"Hayaathun Gelli Dhiyathan"		Solo
2001	Tharaanaa	"Hithuge Yaaraa Kuraashey Ithubaaru"	Adam Haleem Adhnan	Mohamed Huzam
2001	Tharaanaa	"Vaudhekey Bunan En'gey"	Hafsa Ali	Umar Zahir
2001	Theeru	"Dhathivaanee Hellun Dheythee Ey"		Ibrahim Shakeeb
2002	Dhanvaru	"Eyrugaa Ufaa"	Ahmed Haleem	Solo
2002	Dhanvaru	"Mi Dhefai Olhi Varu Nethidhaaney"	Ahmed Haleem	Solo
2002	Dhanvaru	"Fari Fari Loluge Belun Feney"	Ahmed Haleem	Loosiyan Abdul Rahuman
2002	Fari Raanee	"Raaniyaa.. Raaniyaa"		Ahmed Athif
2002	Guraha	"Dhaathee Dheloa Numaraashey"		Umar Zahir
2002	Guraha	"Hithugaavi Ishqu"	Adam Haleem Adhnan	Umar Zahir
2002	Jazbaath	"Kairiah Kalaa Aima Vey Ufaa"	Mausoom Shakir	Ali Rameez
2002	Kashfu	"Dheynuhe Loabi Edhey"		Umar Zahir
2002	Kashfu	"Moonu Thee Hiyy Edhey"	Adam Haleem Adhnan	Mohamed Huzam
2002	Khanjaru	"Aadhey Aadhey Loabi Midhuniyeyn"	Ahmed Nashidh (Dharavandhoo)	Hassan Ilham
2002	Khanjaru	"Dhereyaku Thibemaahey"	Adam Naseer Ibrahim	Hassan Ilham
2002	Khanjaru	"Dhehiyy Fahtharuvee" (Duet Version)	Adam Naseer Ibrahim (Poem verse by Abdulla Sodhiq)	Ali Rameez
2002	Leykokaa	"Hunnanveehey Heylaa"		Solo
2002	Leykokaa	"Loabin Hoadhamaahey"		Solo
2002	Loabi	"Beynumey Loabi Haadha Kollaidheyn"	Boi Ahmed Khaleel	Abdul Baaree
2002	Loabi	"Magey Reydhuvaa"	Boi Ahmed Khaleel	Ali Rameez
2002	Loabi	"Hithugaa Zakhamuthah Hedhijjey"	Boi Ahmed Khaleel	Hassan Ilham
2002	Loabi	"Loa Fureynehaa Sazaa"	Boi Ahmed Khaleel	Solo
2002	Paruvaana	"Gaathugaa Hurumun"	Mohamed Huzam	Mohamed Huzam
2002	Samaasa	"Jehilunve Mey Thelhey Goiyvey"	Abdulla Muaz Yoosuf	Ali Rameez
2002	Samaasa	"Neyngey Gotheh Vey"	Abdulla Muaz Yoosuf	Ali Rameez
2002	Samaasa	"Heelaa Nuroi Heelaa"	Abdulla Muaz Yoosuf	Umar Zahir
2002	Samaasa	"Nuthemeyshey"	Abdulla Muaz Yoosuf	Abdul Baaree
2003	Billoori	"Bahdhal Vevey Goiy Veemaa"	Ismail Mubarik	Hassan Ilham
2003	Dheraha	"Dhey Zuvaan"		Solo
2003	Dheraha	"Fenifaa Mashah Balayey Mihaaru"	Ahmed Sharumeel	Abdul Hannan Moosa Didi
2003	Dheraha	"Khiyaal Kuraa Ithubaaru Kuraashey"		Imaadh Ismail
2003	Haadhisaa 3	"Haadha Amaan Thanekey"		Umar Zahir
2003	Himeyn Dhanvaru	"Hithaa Hithaa"	Easa Shareef	Abdul Baaree
2003	Himeyn Dhanvaru	"Madumadun Hurebalaa"	Ahmed Haleem	Solo
2003	Himeyn Dhanvaru	"Vaaneybaa"	Aishath Suiza	Solo
2003	Himeyn Dhanvaru	"Meygaa Erey Firumaalaa"	Hussain Sobah	Hussain Sobah
2003	Hiyy Roavarun	"Kuran Gandhee Huvaa"	Easa Shareef	Hassan Ilham
2003	Hiyy Roavarun	"Thi Dheloa Fenifaa Jaadhuvee"	Adam Haleem Adhnan	Hassan Ilham
2003	Hiyy Roavarun	"Thiyey Loabi Magey"	Adam Haleem Adhnan	Ibrahim Rameez
2003	Hiyy Roavarun	"Dhehiyy Fahtharuvee" (Female Version)	Adam Haleem Adhnan	Solo
2003	Inthizaarugai...	"Bahdhal Kollan Annaashey"	Easa Shareef	Solo
2003	Jaadhoo	"Loaiybaa Ufaa Dheefaa Mihaaru"	Ahmed Nashidh (Dharavandhoo)	Solo
2003	Jaadhoo	"Jahanee Hithugaa"		Ahmed Moosa (Ammaty)
2003	Kinaaree	"Loabivun Yaaru Buney"	Adam Haleem Adhnan	Hassan Ilham
2003	Kinaaree	"Dheyn Ufaa Vaaney"	Adam Haleem Adhnan	Mukhthar Adam
2003	Kinaaree	"Ahaashey Loabivaa Ey Ahaashey"	Adam Naseer Ibrahim	Abdul Baaree
2003	Kinaaree	"Bunedheynamey Haalathu Mirey"		Ibrahim Rameez
2003	Laal Heeraa	"Disco Lavaset"		Abdul Baaree, Hassan Ilham, Mukhthar Adam
2003	Laal Heeraa	"Aslu Zuvaanun Heelaa Ulhefaa"		Solo
2003	Laal Heeraa	"Gulzaarakee Thiyey"		Abdul Baaree
2003	Loabi Loabin	"Hureveyney Thiya Moonah Balan"	Ahmed Saleem	Loosiyan Abdul Rahuman
2003	Loabi Loabin	"Hurenimidhaanee"	Ahmed Saleem	Solo
2003	Mizaaju	"Thiya Khiyaal Foheleveyhey"	Easa Shareef	Abdul Hannan Moosa Didi
2003	Nuruhunas	"Kudhi Kudhi Himanaaru Thakehgaa"	Ahmed Nashidh (Dharavandhoo)	Hassan Ilham
2003	Rasmaa	"Libeythee Ufaa Migothah"		Hassan Ilham
2003	Rasmaa	"Thi Farudhaa Nagaashey"		Abdul Baaree
2003	Reehchey Thi Moonu	"Lakka Visnaa Bunan"	Ahmed Nashid (Dharavandhoo)	Abdul Hannan Moosa Didi
2003	Reehchey Thi Moonu	"Fenifaa Mashah"	Ahmed Sharumeel	Abdul Hannan Moosa Didi
2003	Reehchey Thi Moonu	"Dhurunuvaashey Jaanaa"	Fathimath Nahula	Abdul Hannan Moosa Didi
2003	Reehchey Thi Moonu	"Khiyaaluga Loabin Ulheveyneythaa Ey"		Massoodh Moosa Didi
2003	Reehchey Thi Moonu	"Moosun Badhaluvey"		Massoodh Moosa Didi
2003	Reehchey Thi Moonu	"Dhey Zuvaan"		Solo
2003	Reehchey Thi Moonu	"Dhanyaa Dhanyaa Dhanyaa Dhey"		Solo
2003	Rosemarry	"Ey Aashiqaa"		Solo
2003	Single	"Asthaa Geyah Dhaanvee Ey"	Easa Shareef	Loosiyan Abdul Rahuman
2004	Ehan'dhaanugai...	"Edhevey Bahaareege Fari Malakee"		Solo
2004	Hooru	"Beynun Beynun"		Abdul Baaree
2004	Maamuige Reythah	"Aathee Magey Aathee"	Abdul Hameedh	Solo
2004	Maamuige Reythah	"Hama Neyngey Vee Majuboorey"	Easa Shareef	Solo
2004	Mainaa	"Nunidhey Nunidhey"	Ahmed Sharumeel	Asim Thaufeeq
2004	Mainaa	"Loabivaanuhey Eynaa Ahanee"	Kaneeru Abdul Raheem	Asim Thaufeeq
2004	Mainaa	"Vaudhaa Huvaathahves Kureemey"	Aishath Suiza	Asim Thaufeeq
2004	Mainaa	"Hithuge Hin'gumaa Kalaayaa"	Shifa Thaufeeq	Asim Thaufeeq
2004	Qaathil	"Yaaraa Miee Loabi Heylaa Moosunhey"	Easa Shareef	Solo
2004	Zamaan	"Kolhu Neiy Kolhah"	Boi Ahmed Khaleel	Solo
2004	Single	"Thiya Mooney Kurehifaavee"	Easa Shareef	Solo
2004	Single	"Asthaa Mihaaru Yaaru"		Solo
2004	Single	"Hayaathah Kalaa Genai Mee Bahaarekey"		Solo
2004	Single	"Konme Vindheh"		Unknown Artist
2005	Dhilaasaa	"Mihiyy Adhu Dhevijjey"	Adam Haleem Adhnan	Abdul Baaree
2005	Fari Goma	"Kalaa Nuruhenhey"	Adam Haleem Adhnan	Mukhthar Adam
2005	Fari Goma	"Thiyaee Amaazu"	Adam Haleem Adhnan	Abdul Baaree
2005	Fura Dhanvaru	"Laila Lailaa"	Shareefa Fakhree	Solo
2005	Fura Dhanvaru	"Kairin Fenumun Yaaraa"	Shareefa Fakhree	Abdul Baaree
2005	Hiyy Dheefaa	"Hiyy Dheefaa Dhaneethoa"	Adam Haleem Adhnan	Abdul Baaree
2005	Kuri Inthizaarugai...	"Nindhavaashey Un'gugaa"		Solo
2005	Maahiyaa	"Meyge Vindhaa Hithaa"	Adam Haleem Adhnan	Abdul Baaree
2005	Mirey	"Loabin Aisbalaa"		Abdul Sameeu
2005	Zuvaanaa	"Hithugaa Vanee Yaaraa Namey"		Mumthaz Moosa
2006	Fari Dheyliyaa	"Jaanu Dhemey Bune Noonhey"		Abdul Baaree
2006	Hiyy Dheewaanaa 3	"Hoadheyney Kalaa"	Shareefa Fakhree	Ibrahim Zaid Ali
2006	Hiyy Dheewaanaa 3	"Ishqu Yaaraa Gendhaneehey"	Ahmed Nashidh (Dharavandhoo)	Mumthaz Moosa
2006	Jism	"Hiyy Vey Dheewaanaa"	Adam Haleem Adhnan	Hussain Ali
2006	Jism	"Moosun Mi Kihaa Nalahey"	Adam Haleem Adhnan	Abdulla Waheedh (Waddey)
2006	Mihan'dhaanugai...	"Inthizaarey Othee Hiyy Edheythee"	Easa Shareef	Solo
2006	Mihithun	"Vaudhaa Huvaa"	Adam Haleem Adhnan	Mohamed Huzam
2006	Mihithun	"Nudhaashey Athugaa Hifaa"	Adam Haleem Adhnan	Mukhthar Adam
2006	Yaaraanulaa	"Yaaraanulaa.. Yaaraanulaa"		Mukhthar Adam
2006	Yaaraanulaa	"Yaaraanulaa.. Yaaraanulaa" (Remix Version)		Mukhthar Adam
2006	Yaaraanulaa	"Chaaley Thiya Hinithunvun"		Hassan Ilham
2007	Thihan'dhaanugai...	"Mee Veegothey"	Fenthashi Mohamed Khaleel	Solo
2007	Single	"Foari Dheyshe Foari Dhee"	Hamdhoon Hameedh	Umar Zahir, Ali Abdul Kareem, Mohamed Suhail, Begonia Shareef
2008	Hiyy Dheewaanaa 4	"O Beywafaa"	Adam Haleem Adhnan	Solo
2008	Hiyy Dhemey Loabin	"Falakaa Kaunaa"	Adam Haleem Adhnan	Hussain Ali
2008	Hiyy Sihenee	"Mihithugaa Kalaa Vey"	Adam Haleem Adhnan	Abdul Baaree
2008	Thihan'dhaanugai Remix	"Hithugaa Vaa Ufaa Thiya Ey"	Umar Zahir	Solo
2009	Adhives... Loabivey	"Loabin Kalaa Kaireegaa Vaanamey"	Mohamed Abdul Ghanee	Mukhthar Adam
2009	Adhives... Loabivey	"Miyey Loabeege Hadhiyaa"		Abdul Baaree
2009	Ehan'dhaanugai Duet	"Kuraa Khiyaalakee Thiya Ey"		Mohamed Ahmed (Dokey)
2009	Fari Kamana	"Basnaahanee Hiyy Keehvehey"	Ahmed Haleem	Hassan Ilham
2009	Fari Kamana	"Hithugavi Fasaanaa"	Ahmed Haleem	Hussain Ali
2009	Fari Kamana	"Mee Ishquthaa Ey"	Ahmed Haleem	Solo
2009	Feniliyas	"Kaakuthoa Ei"		Solo
2009	Feniliyas	"Kaakuhey Midhuniyeygaa"		Solo
2009	Hiyy Dheebalaa 2	"Magey Reydhuvaa"	Boi Ahmed Khaleel	Ali Rameez
2009	Hiyy Furendhen	"Abadhuves Feneyey Kalaa"	Ahmed Nashidh (Dharavandhoo)	Hassan Ilham
2009	Mi Dhehiyy Gulhuney	"Mi Dhehiyy Gulhuney"		Mumthaz Moosa
2009	Nazaaraa	"Magey Loabi Hibain"	Zarana Zareer	Abdul Baaree
2009	Nazaaraa	"Kuranee Ekeegaa Samaasaa"	Zarana Zareer	Abdul Baaree
2009	Nazaaraa	"Dhanvelumun Phone Nagaa"	Zarana Zareer	Solo
2009	Shaahee Kamana	"Gulhaalaashey"		Mukhthar Adam
2009	Shaahee Kamana	"Kaireegaa Hurey"		Solo
2009	Shaahee Kamana	"Seedhaa Dhehiyy Kollan Hin'gaa"		Solo
2009	Shaahee Kamana	"Thiya Loabivaa Shaahee Ashey"		Mohamed Abdul Ghanee
2009	Single	"Inthihaa Loaiybaa Ufaa"		Aaddey
2009	Single	"Dhondhooni Nidhaalaashey"		Solo
2010	Loabeege Vaguthu	"Loabivey.. Loabivey"	Ahmed Haleem	Mohamed Abdul Ghanee
2010	Loabeege Vaguthu	"Aashiqaa Ey Magey"	Ahmed Haleem	Mohamed Abdul Ghanee
2010	Loabeege Vaguthu	"Aashiqaa Ey Aadhey"	Ahmed Haleem	Mohamed Abdul Ghanee
2010	Loabeege Vaguthu	"Shakku Kurevumun Loaiybah"	Ahmed Haleem	Mohamed Abdul Ghanee
2010	Loabeege Vaguthu	"Nuhuttaa Loabidhee Mithuraa"	Ahmed Haleem	Mumthaz Moosa
2010	Thin Fiya	"Nashame Nashame"		Solo
2010	Vasmeeru	"Rain Is Falling"		Hassan Ilham
2010	Vasmeeru	"Hithuge Therein"	Shifa Thaufeeq	Solo
2010	Vasmeeru	"Thiyaee Finikan"		Hassan Jalaal
2011	Hiyy Dheewaanaa 5	"Mi Dhefai Olhi Varu Nethidhaaney"	Ahmed Haleem	Solo
2011	Hiyy Dheewaanaa 5	"Hunnanveehey Heylaa"		Solo
2011	Hiyy Dheewaanaa 5	"Meygaa Veyey Fevifaa"		Hassan Ilham
2011	Leveythee Mi Neyvaa	"Vaa Jazubaathey Mee Loabin"		Mukhthar Adam
2013	Hiyy Dheebalaa 3	"Dhiriulhun Fasleveythan"	Mohamed Abdul Ghanee	Solo
2013	Hiyy Dheewaanaa 6	"Loabin Fidhaa Ma Vaanamey"	Ahmed Nashidh (Dharavandhoo)	Hassan Tholaaq
2013	Hiyy Dheewaanaa 6	"Hiyy Mithurah Dheyn Beynumey"		Ali Abdulla (Komandoo)
2013	Hiyy Dheewaanaa 6	"Vaaneybaa"	Aishath Suiza	Solo
2013	Soul	"All Alone"	Shifa Thaufeeq	Solo
2013	Soul	"Dheravey Dheravey"	Shifa Thaufeeq	Solo
2013	Soul	"Hiyy Loabin Dhinee"	Shifa Thaufeeq	Solo
2013	Soul	"Ummeedhey"	Shifa Thaufeeq	Solo
2013	Soul	"Dheynan Hiyy Nagaafaa"	Shifa Thaufeeq	Hussain Shaadh
2014	Hiyy Dheewaanaa: Suny Special	"Hiyy Dheewaanaa Kuruvaifiyey"		Hassan Tholaaq
2014	Single	"Reyvefaa Alun"	Ismail Mubarik	Solo
2015	Ehan'dhaanugai Starz	"Han'dhakee Kalaa Kamugaa Viyas"		Umar Zahir
2017	Ran Han'dhaanugai...: S02	"Jaanu Dheyn"	Ali Riza	Mohamed Zaleef Abdulla
2017	Celebrating 20	"Loabeegaa Magey Vaanamey"	Fathuhulla Abdul Fahthah (Fatho)	Yaamin Rasheedh
2018	Single	"Bali Mi En'guneemaa Sihey"	Zarana Zareer	Solo
2018	Dhivehi Fuluhunge 85th Anniversary	"Jehilunvumeh Nethi Azumugaa"		Shalabee Ibrahim, Yaamin Rasheedh
2018	Han'dhakee Thee Hiyy Edhey	"Hithuge Therein"	Shifa Thaufeeq	Hassan Jalaal
2018	Mooney Thiee Hiyy Edhey	"Samaasaa Samaasaa" (Unplugged Version)	Easa Shareef	Umar Zahir
2018	Mooney Thiee Hiyy Edhey	"Moosumey Mee" (Unplugged Version)	Mohamed Zaheen	Umar Zahir
2018	Mooney Thiee Hiyy Edhey	"Oagaaverivey Loabivaa" (Unplugged Version)	Mausoom Shakir	Umar Zahir
2018	Mooney Thiee Hiyy Edhey	"Mooney Thiee Hiyy Edhey" (Unplugged Version)	Mausoom Shakir	Umar Zahir
2018	Mooney Thiee Hiyy Edhey	"Ajeeb Daastan Hai Yeh" (Unplugged Version)	Shailendra	Umar Zahir
2020	Single	"Ilaahee Mibin"	Abdul Rasheedh Hussain	Various Artists
2020	Loabi Nulibunas	"Nudhaashey Hithi Mi Sazaa"		Solo
2020	Single	"Dhinee Zaharu Mithuraa" (Cover Version)		Shalabee Ibrahim
2021	Adhives Reethi 1442	"Balamun Midhaa Sofuhaathakun"		Solo
2021	Adhives Reethi 1442	"Ey Malaa Thiyaee Magey"		Solo
2021	Adhives Reethi 1442	"Heeviyey"		Solo
2021	Adhives Reethi 1442	"Hithuge Therein"	Shifa Thaufeeq	Solo
2021	Adhives Reethi 1442	"Maakan'duge Medhutherey"		Solo
2021	Soba With Tharin: Shifa Thaufeeq	"Saahibaa"	Hussain Sobah	Hussain Sobah
2021	Soba With Tharin: Shifa Thaufeeq	"Loabeegaa Huvaa"		Hussain Sobah
2021	Soba With Tharin: Shifa Thaufeeq	"Vaguthaa Zamaan"		Hussain Sobah
2021	Soba With Tharin: Shifa Thaufeeq	"Hiyy Edheythee Ma Ulhemey"		Hussain Sobah
2021	Soba With Tharin: Shifa Thaufeeq	"Dhemoonaa Lolaa Loa"		Hussain Sobah
2021	Soba With Tharin: Shifa Thaufeeq	"Folhuvan Ma Beynumee"		Hussain Sobah
2025	Eid Mubarak 1446	"Ufaaveri Ekuveri Eidh Eh Mee"	Abdul Hannan Moosa Didi	Abdul Hannan Moosa Didi, Lileetha Massoodh, Asim Thaufeeq

== Accolades ==
Year	Award	Category	Nominated work	Result	Ref(s)
1995	Aafathis Awards – 1995	Best Female Playback Singer	"Aavaaney Naa" - Masthu	Won	
1996	Aafathis Awards – 1996	Best Female Playback Singer		Won	
1996	2nd Gaumee Film Awards	Best Female Playback Singer	"Aavaaney Naa" - Masthu	Won	
1998	Aafathis Awards – 1998	Best Female Playback Singer		Won	
2000	National Award of Recognition	Performing Arts - Singing		Won	
2007	4th Gaumee Film Awards	Best Female Playback Singer	"Ossifavaa Iru Eree Ey" - Edhi Edhi Hoadheemey	Won	
2011	2nd SunFM Awards	Most Entertaining Female Vocalist		Nominated	
2012	2nd Maldives Film Awards	Best Female Playback Singer	"Loabeegaa" - 14 Vileyrey	Won	
2014	3rd Maldives Film Awards	Best Female Playback Singer	"Vamey Fun Khiyaalu" - Fathis Handhuvaruge Feshun 3D	Nominated	
2014	3rd Maldives Film Awards	Best Lyrics	"Zuvaanaa Thiyanan Hithugaa" - Fathis Handhuvaruge Feshun 3D	Nominated	
2015	6th Gaumee Film Awards	Best Female Playback Singer	"Aadhey Araamu" - Zalzalaa En'buri Aun	Won	
2015	6th Gaumee Film Awards	Best Original Song	"Bunaa Hiyy Vey" - Zalzalaa En'buri Aun (Shared with Ayyuman Shareef)	Won	
2015	6th Gaumee Film Awards	Best Original Song	"Aadhey Aadhey" - Zalzalaa En'buri Aun (Shared with Ayyuman Shareef)	Nominated	
2015	6th Gaumee Film Awards	Best Original Song	"Aadhey Araamu" - Zalzalaa En'buri Aun (Shared with Ayyuman Shareef)	Nominated	
2016	7th Gaumee Film Awards	Best Female Playback Singer	"Zuvaanaa Thiyanan Hithugaa" - Fathis Handhuvaruge Feshun 3D	Won	
2016	7th Gaumee Film Awards	Best Female Playback Singer	"Edhemey Kalaayah Inthihaa" - Fathis Handhuvaruge Feshun 3D	Nominated	
2016	7th Gaumee Film Awards	Best Original Song	Fathis Handhuvaruge Feshun 3D	Nominated	
2017	8th Gaumee Film Awards	Best Female Playback Singer	"Hiy Meygaa Mibunanee" - Aniyaa	Nominated	
