= Fathimath Azifa =

Maldivian film actress

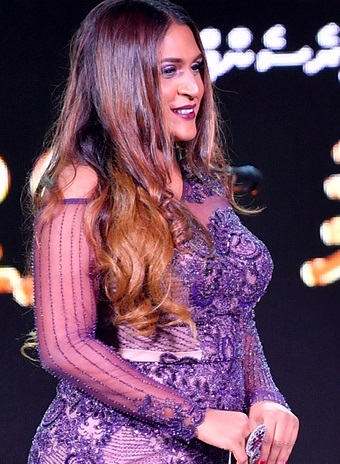
- Azifa at 9th Gaumee Film Awards ceremony, 2019
- Born: 28 October 1988 (age 37)
- Occupation: Actress
- Years active: 2009–present
- Spouse: Ahmed Saeed (m. 2016)
- Children: 1

Fathimath Azifa (born 28 October 1988) is a Maldivian film actress. She has established a career in Maldivian films and is the recipient of several awards, including a Gaumee Film Award.

== Career ==
=== 2010–16: Debut and breakthrough ===
Azifa made her career debut while studying at grade four, in an episode from Yoosuf Rafeeu's comedy television series Dhiriulhumakee Mieebaa. Afterwards, she appeared in another episode of the same series aired in 2007. After a break of two years, she appeared in Ali Shifau's suspense thriller Happy Birthday (2009) which narrates the story of a simple man who receives a call on his birthday informing that his wife and son have been kidnapped, only to be returned for a ransom. Azifa played the role of Fazla, a colleague of a straightforward man who had an unfortunate birthday. A total of five shows with little occupancy were screened at the cinema, declaring the film a commercial failure, despite the positive response from the critics. Winning five Gaumee Film Awards and twelve Maldives Film Awards, the film was also screened at the Venice Film Festival. Afterwards, she appeared as model in a special appearance in Niuma Mohamed's directorial debut drama film Niuma (2010). She was next signed on by Amjad Ibrahim to play a devious maid in his family drama Hithey Dheymee (2011) alongside Amira Ismail and Hussain Solah which failed to do well commercially and critically.

In 2011 Azifa played the role of Areeka, an introverted prudent girlfriend living a modest lifestyle, in the Moomin Fuad-directed crime tragedy drama Loodhifa. Featuring an ensemble cast, the film deals with current social issues in the society told from different perspectives of the characters. Made on a budget of MVR 600,000, the film was declared a commercial failure though it received wide critical acclaim. Her portrayal garnered her several awards, including a Gaumee Film Award for Best Supporting Actress and a nomination for the Best Actress at the 2nd Maldives Film Awards ceremony. Azifa next starred alongside Niuma Mohamed and Ismail Rasheed in Hussain Munawwar's romantic drama Sazaa. Story of the film revolves around a carefree girl whose life flips upside down once she is forced to marry a brutal man. She played the role of an independent woman who commits suicide when she is brutally raped by her brother-in-law. Ahmed Nadheem reviewing from Haveeru wrote: Azifa leaves a strong impact. She seems polishing her acting skills with each movies". Though her performance received positive comments, reviewers were displeased with her the character when a "well-developed strong character ended up so badly". Critically well-received, the film emerged as a commercial success. It was followed by Hamid Ali's romantic family drama Laelaa opposite Yoosuf Shafeeu which was a critical and box office failure.

In 2014, Azifa starred opposite Yoosuf Shafeeu in the suspense thriller film 24 Gadi Iru (2014) which was co-directed by Shafeeu and Mohamed Rasheed. The film focuses on a romantic relationship between a girl diagnosed with mental illness and her psychiatrist. Production of the film began in 2010, though it was theatrically released four years later. Her role as Reesha, a psycho girl and the film received mixed reviews from critics. Ahmed Nadheem reviewing from Haveeru wrote: "Indeed, Azifa is a very promising actress and she has proved her worth in the industry with Loodhifa. However an actor needs a good mentor to extract the best in oneself. It is very clear the directors haven't tried a bit to bring out the raw talent inside of her". She next starred in Abdul Faththaah's romantic drama Aadheys, alongside Niuma Mohamed, Hussain Sobah, Amira Ismail, Moosa Zakariyya and Ali Azim. Filming was completed in 2011, though it was released three years following the death of film producer Hassain Ali. It revolves around a sacrificing mother and her affection towards her child. Upon release, the film received mixed reviews from critics and failed to leave an impression commercially. Ismail Naail reviewing from Vaguthu wrote: "In contrast to her performance in Loodhifa, this can be termed as disappointing". At the 8th Gaumee Film Awards she received her second Best Supporting Actress nomination for her role in the film.

Mohamed Aboobakuru-directed Randhari was Azifa's only release of 2015. Her portrayal of the character Aisha, along with the film, received negative reviews from critics and performed below average at the box office. The following year, she made a special appearance in the Yoosuf Shafeeu-directed Baiveriyaa (2016), a comedy film featuring an ensemble cast. The film emerged as one of the highest grossing Maldivian films of the year.

=== 2017–present: Commercial success ===
Azifa's first release of 2017 came in the Ali Musthafa-directed family drama Malikaa. Featuring Nuzuhath Shuaib and Mohamed Jumayyil in the lead role, the film tells the story of the sidelined daughter, played by Shuaib, who manages the family. Azifa played the role of Jeeza, the envious and insecure sister-in-law of the title character, showing an excessive interest in acquiring money and wealth. Ahmed Nadheem, revieweing for Avas opined that Azifa was the only star who "left an impression in the acting department" from the film, though he felt the "flaws in her character development led to lack of exhilaration" at her presence. Despite low expectations from trade analysts, the film received mixed reviews and performed moderately at the box office. She next featured alongside an ensemble cast including Yoosuf Shafeeu, Mohamed Manik, Ahmed Saeed and Ali Seezan in the romantic comedy film Naughty 40 which was directed by Shafeeu. The film revolves around three friends, Ashwanee, Ahsan and Ajwad (Played by Shafeeu, Saeed and Manik respectively) who are single and having a youthful outlook, in spite of being in their forties. Azifa played the role of Taniya, the beguiling lady signed up by her aunt to seduce and take down their rival businessman in the island, Jawad. The film met with both critical and commercial success, emerging as one of the highest grossing Maldivian films of 2017.

She was next seen alongside Jadhulla Ismail in the Mohamed Aboobakuru-directed Neydhen Vakivaakah, which was a critical and commercial failure. In the film she played the role of Zeena, a woman who is having a tragic and unfortunate love life where she is forced to separate from her lovers after dreadful events. Her fourth and final release of the year was Aishath Rishmy's romantic drama Bos. Penned and produced by Fathimath Nahula, the film tells the story of Ibaa (played by Mariyam Azza), a woman from a royal family and her battle with depression after the demise of her father. Azifa played the role of June, a greedy woman going to extreme lengths for money, the love interest of Maish (played by Ibrahim Jihad) while duping other men in her trap. A reviewer from Avas criticise the film for having resemblance with American coming-of-age romantic drama A Walk to Remember (2002) and Indian romantic drama Sanam Teri Kasam (2016), however applauded Azifa's performance as the greedy and ungrateful woman. Though the film received mixed response from critics, it emerged as the highest grossing Maldivian film of 2017.

2018 was a dull year for Maldivian film-industry with regards to 2018 Maldivian presidential election, hence only one film of Azifa was released during the year; a suspense thriller film Dhevansoora (2018) written and directed by Yoosuf Shafeeu. The film marks Shafeeu's thirtieth direction and features an ensemble cast of twenty-one actors. Revolving around a murder investigation, she played an imaginary doctor counselling the character played by Shafeeu; a man suffering from dissociative identity disorder. The film received positive reviews from critics and was considered a "norm-breaker" for the Maldivian cinema. Ahmed Hameed Adam reviewing from VNews applauded Azifa's performance and found her to "sensuous yet convincing". The following year, she starred in Yoosuf Shafeeu's horror comedy film 40+ (2019), a sequel to 2017 released comedy film Naughty 40, which was well received both critically and commercially.

== Media image ==
In 2012, Azifa was ranked at the sixth position in the list of "Best Actresses in Maldives" compiled by Haveeru, where writer Ahmed Nadheem considered her the "most promising actress" from the current generation and credited her "powerful performance" in Loodhifa for the same. In 2018, Azifa was ranked in the sixth position from Dho?'s list of Top Ten Actresses of Maldives where writer Aishath Maaha opined that Azifa is a "promising" actress who perfectly pulls off several characters, mostly supporting roles.

== Personal life ==
On 2 September 2016, Azifa married one of her co-stars, Ahmed Saeed. On 18 May 2019, Azifa gave birth to a daughter.

== Filmography ==
=== Feature film ===
Year	Title	Role	Notes	Ref(s)
2009	Happy Birthday	Fazla		
2010	Niuma	Model	Special appearance	
2011	Hithey Dheymee	Shifa		
2011	Loodhifa	Areeka	Gaumee Film Award for Best Supporting Actress; Nominated—Maldives Film Award for Best Actress	
2011	Sazaa	Zeena		
2011	Laelaa	Leena		
2014	Raanee	Nathasha		
2014	24 Gadi Iru	Reesha		
2014	Aadheys	Niha	Nominated—Gaumee Film Award for Best Supporting Actress	
2015	Randhari	Aisha		
2016	Baiveriyaa	Herself	Special appearance	
2017	Malikaa	Jeeza		
2017	Naughty 40	Thaniya		
2017	Neydhen Vakivaakah	Aishath Zeena		
2017	Bos	June	Nominated—Gaumee Film Award for Best Supporting Actress	
2018	Dhevansoora	Shiyama	Nominated—Gaumee Film Award for Best Supporting Actress	
2019	40+	Thaniya		
2026	Gilan †	Nadhuva/Ulfa	Completed; Double role	

=== Television ===
Year	Title	Role	Notes	Ref(s)
2008	Hanaa	Hanaa	Main role	
2008	Loabi Nuviyas Firumaaladhee		Main role	
2008	FB!		Main role	
2008	Loabin Hiyy Furenee	Nathasha	Main role; 6 episodes	
2009	Silsilaa	Liusha	Main role; 5 episodes	
2009	Sirru Sirrun Kalaa	Nisha	Main role	
2009	Vakinuvaan Bunefaa Vaudheh Nuvanhey?	Reema	Main role; 13 episodes	
2010	14 February	Shima / Suma	Main role; 4 episodes	
2011	Furaana Dheynan	Aishath Rizna	Main role; 4 episodes	
2012	San'dhuraveerey		Main role; 5 episodes	
2019–2020	Haasaa	Nima	Main role; 13 episodes	
2023	Mirai	Mira's friend	Guest role; Episode: "Faafa"	

=== Short film ===
Year	Title	Role	Notes	Ref(s)
2008	Girlfriend	Raaya		
2009	Lhakoe	Herself	Special appearance	
2009	Santhi Mariyanbu 3	Zakiyya		
2010	Loabeege Ninja	Jasmine		
2011	Farihibe 3	Shaheema		
2011	Bodu 13 Muassasaa	Sharu		
2012	13 Ah Visnaa Dhehaas	Zuleykha	Gaumee Film Award for Best Supporting Actress - Short Film; Nominated—Maldives Film Award for Best Supporting Actress - Short Film	
2013	Farihibe 4	Abidha	Gaumee Film Award for Best Actress - Short Film; Maldives Film Award for Best Actress - Short Film	
2020	KKB: Kuda Kuda Baaru	Mariyam		

== Accolades ==
Year	Award	Category	Nominated work	Result	Ref(s)
2012	2nd Maldives Film Awards	Best Actress	Loodhifa	Nominated	
2014	3rd Maldives Film Awards	Best Actress - Short film	Farihibe 4	Won	
2014	3rd Maldives Film Awards	Best Supporting Actress - Short film	13 Ah Visnaa Dhehaas	Nominated	
2014	3rd Maldives Film Awards	Best Supporting Actress - Short film	Siyaasee Koalhun	Nominated	
2014	3rd Maldives Film Awards	Best Makeup - Short film	Farihibe 4 (Shared with Aishath Rishmy)	Won	
2014	3rd Maldives Film Awards	Best Makeup - Short film	Siyaasee Koalhun (Shared with Zeenath Abbas)	Nominated	
2014	3rd Maldives Film Awards	Best Makeup - Short film	13 Ah Visnaa Dhehaas (Shared with Niuma Mohamed)	Nominated	
2016	7th Gaumee Film Awards	Best Supporting Actress	Loodhifa	Won	
2016	7th Gaumee Film Awards	Best Makeup	Loodhifa	Nominated	
2016	7th Gaumee Film Awards	Best Makeup	Sazaa (Shared with Niuma Mohamed)	Nominated	
2017	8th Gaumee Film Awards	Best Supporting Actress	Aadheys	Nominated	
2017	8th Gaumee Film Awards	Best Actress - Short Film	Farihibe 4	Won	
2017	8th Gaumee Film Awards	Best Supporting Actress - Short Film	13 Ah Visnaa Dhehaas	Won	
2017	8th Gaumee Film Awards	Best Supporting Actress - Short Film	Farihibe 3	Nominated	
2019	9th Gaumee Film Awards	Best Supporting Actress	Bos	Nominated	
2019	9th Gaumee Film Awards	Best Supporting Actress	Dhevansoora	Nominated	
