= Happy Birthday (2009 film) =

- Official film poster
- Directed by: Moomin Fuad
- Written by: Moomin Fuad
- Screenplay by: Moomin Fuad
- Produced by: Mohamed Ali
- Starring: Yoosuf Shafeeu; Niuma Mohamed
- Cinematography: Moomin Fuad
- Edited by: Ali Shifau
- Music by: Shaaz Saeed; Basith Saeed
- Production company: Dark Rain Entertainment
- Release date: May 25, 2009
- Country: Maldives
- Language: Dhivehi

Happy Birthday is a 2009 Maldivian suspense thriller film written and directed by Moomin Fuad. Produced by Yoosuf Mohamed Ali under Dark Rain Entertainment, the film stars Yoosuf Shafeeu and Niuma Mohamed in pivotal roles. Winning five Gaumee Film Awards and twelve Maldives Film Awards, the film was also screened at the Venice Film Festival.

The film narrates the story of a simple man who receives a call on his birthday informing that his wife and son have been kidnapped and is asked to get the ransom if he wants them back. Though the film received positive reviews from critics, it was a commercial failure. According to Fuad, its failure had a big impact on his career and he lost several other projects due to its financial loss.

== Cast ==
- Yoosuf Shafeeu as Asif
- Niuma Mohamed as Suza
- Mohamed Rasheed as Office Boss
- Ahmed Asim as Ahmed
- Ahmed Saeed as Hussain
- Fathimath Azifa as Fazla
- Ali Farooq as Bank Manager
- Ismail Nuweil as Akko
- Abdul Satthar as Father
- Nashmee Mohamed Saeed as Bank Girl

== Soundtrack ==
Track listing
No.	Title	Lyrics	Music	Singer(s)	Length
1.	"Araamu"	Abdulla Hameed Fahmy	Scores of Flair	Scores of Flair
2.	"Happy Birthay"		Trio Band	Trio Band

== Reception ==
The film received positive reviews from critics. Ifraz Ali from Avas called the film a "masterpiece" of Fuad in terms of writing and direction. A total of five shows with little occupancy were screened at the cinema and was crashed afterwards. Regarding its commercial failure, producer Mohamed Ali noted; "Maldivians were experiencing a wave of melodrama at the time, few to none were aware of art films".

== Accolades ==
Year	Award	Category	Recipients	Result	Ref.
2011	1st Maldives Film Awards	Best Film	Happy Birthday	Won	
2011	1st Maldives Film Awards	Best Director	Moomin Fuad	Won	
2011	1st Maldives Film Awards	Best Actor	Yoosuf Shafeeu	Won	
2011	1st Maldives Film Awards	Best Editing	Ali Shifau	Won	
2011	1st Maldives Film Awards	Best Cinematography	Moomin Fuad	Won	
2011	1st Maldives Film Awards	Best Screenplay	Moomin Fuad	Won	
2011	1st Maldives Film Awards	Best Art Direction	Ali Shifau, Moomin Fuad	Won	
2011	1st Maldives Film Awards	Best Child Artist	Ismail Nuwail	Nominated	
2011	1st Maldives Film Awards	Best Original Song	Moomin Fuad - "Araamu"	Won	
2011	1st Maldives Film Awards	Best Original Score	Shaaz Saeed, Abdul Basith	Won	
2011	1st Maldives Film Awards	Best Sound Editing	Ali Shifau	Won	
2011	1st Maldives Film Awards	Best Sound Mixing	Ali Shifau, Moomin Fuad	Won	
2011	1st Maldives Film Awards	Best Costume Designer	Ibrahim Ali, Aminath Hassan	Won	
2015	6th Gaumee Film Awards	Best Film	Happy Birthday	Won	
2015	6th Gaumee Film Awards	Best Director	Moomin Fuad	Won	
2015	6th Gaumee Film Awards	Best Actor	Yoosuf Shafeeu	Won	
2015	6th Gaumee Film Awards	Best Original Song	Moomin Fuad - "Araamu"	Nominated	
2015	6th Gaumee Film Awards	Best Editing	Ali Shifau	Won	
2015	6th Gaumee Film Awards	Best Screenplay	Moomin Fuad	Won	
2015	6th Gaumee Film Awards	Best Art Direction	Moomin Fuad, Ali Shifau, Mohamed Ali	Nominated	
2015	6th Gaumee Film Awards	Best Costume Design	Ibrahim Ali, Aminath Hassan	Nominated	
