= Aminath Rishfa =

Maldivian actress

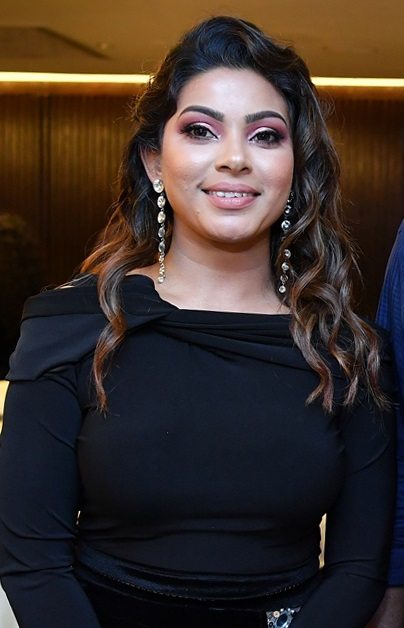
- Rishfa at Niuma Mohamed's Silver Jubilee celebration event, 2019
- Born: 8 May 1985 (age 41)
- Occupation: Actress
- Years active: 2004–present
- Spouse: Yaan Ahmed
- Children: 1

Aminath Rishfa is a Maldivian actress.

== Career ==
Born on 8th may 1985. Rishfa made her screen debut in a video song, "Heela Beleema" starred opposite Mohamed Manik and produced by Udhares Latheef. After featuring in several short films and series, Rishfa collaborated with Hussain Munawwar for his second direction, revenge thriller film Dhilakani (2013) along with Ismail Rasheed, Niuma Mohamed, Mohamed Manik and Mohamed Faisal. The film deals with a man's tumultuous journey to seek vengeance and the demolition of family bond over a girl. The film attracted negative reception from critics while Nadheem wrote: "Embraced with futile characters, impractical scenes and out-dated music, the film has problems in each department whereas Munawwar failed to extract the talent of skillful actors". Despite negative reviews, Rishfa was bestowed with the Best Female Debut award at the 3rd Maldives Film Awards while nominated as the Best Supporting Actress.

In 2015, Rishfa appeared in Ali Seezan's action film Ahsham. The film along with her performance as Maeesha, a nurse, received mixed reviews from critics. The film, made on a budget of MVR 1,500,000, was considered as the most expensive film made in Maldives. It was one of the three entries from Maldives to the SAARC Film Festival in 2016. She then collaborated with Fathimath Nahula for two television drama series. In the first release, a 15-episodes romantic series Vakivumuge Kurin, Rishfa portrayed an irresponsible sister who marries a drug addict. This was followed by Nahula's 13 episodes drama series, Umurah Salaan (2015) which centers on a squabble family which is separated due to the greed for money and misunderstandings. The series which stars Mohamed Faisal, Rishfa, Ahmed Azmeel and Mariyam Azza in lead roles, she portrays the character Reesha, an impotent young woman who deals with a dark past and is afraid to step-up in life. Her next appearance was Hussain Munawwar's Neyngi Yaaru Vakivee (2016) alongside Ahmed Azmeel. Critics panned the film and considered Rishfa's performance as Reema "boring" while criticising the character development. Despite the negative reviews, the film did an average business at the end of its run.

Abdul Fatthah's romantic drama Hahdhu was Rishfa's next film release. She was paid MVR45,000 for the role in the film. The film touched upon controversial issues in the Maldives including the depiction of flogging and also shines a light on mental health by featuring an attempted suicide. Rishfa played the role of Zamha, a single mother whose husband died from a car accident. A reviewer from Avas rated her performance 7 out of 10 and wrote: "This is easily Rishfa's best performance till date, a vast improvement from her previous ventures". The film opened to mixed reviews from critics though it emerged as one of the highest grossing Maldivian films of the year.

2018 was a dull year for Maldivian film-industry with regards to 2018 Maldivian presidential election. Her only release of the year was the first Maldivian web-series, a romantic drama by Fathimath Nahula, Huvaa. The series consisting of sixty episodes and streamed through the digital platform Baiskoafu, centers around a happy and radiant family which breaks into despairing pieces after a tragic incident that led to an unaccountable loss. The series and her performance as a young woman who gets pregnant in an extramarital affair and deals with a love betrayal were positively received.

Rishfa's first release of 2019 was the Moomin Fuad-directed psychological horror thriller Nivairoalhi (2019) which marks Niuma Mohamed's last onscreen film. Revolving around a patient suffering from depression, Rishfa played the role of a doctor. Starring opposite Mohamed, Yoosuf Shafeeu and Ahmed Asim, the film received majorly positive reviews from critics; Aishath Maaha of Dho? favored the performance of the lead actors and mentioned the "neat arrangement" of its screenplay though pointed out its "weak ending" to be unsatisfactory. Later during the year, first Maldivian anthology film was released which featured Rishfa as a helpless pregnant woman in the segment directed by Farooq, titled Gaathil. The project was shot in 2013 and digitally released six years later due to several delays in post-production.

In 2023, Rishfa played the role of a seductive woman in Ali Seezan's erotic thriller Loabi Vevijje, which follows a married man who becomes infatuated with a woman after a one-night stand. The film which was announced in 2019, but halted due to COVID-19 pandemic, opened to generally positive reviews from critics, where as her performance received mixed reviews from critics. Aminath Luba reviewing from The Press found her performance to be "strictly average, nothing exceptional". Similarly, Ahmed Nadheem from Dhauru called her acting "not bad" and "generally okay".

== Media image ==
In 2018, Rishfa was ranked in the eighth position from Dho?'s list of Top Ten Actresses of Maldives where writer Aishath Maaha opined that Rishfa is a "successful" actress who becomes "relevant even after a long gap of absence".

== Filmography ==
Key
†	Denotes films that have not yet been released

=== Feature film ===
Year	Title	Role	Notes	Ref(s)
2013	Dhilakani	Moonisa	Maldives Film Award for Best Female Debut; Maldives Film Award for Best Supporting Actress	
2015	Ahsham	Maeesha		
2016	Neyngi Yaaru Vakivee	Reema		
2017	Hahdhu	Zamha		
2019	Nivairoalhi	Dr. Shehenaz		
2020	Andhirikan	Leeza		
2023	Loabi Vevijje	Maasha		
2023	Kalhaki	Mashidha		
2025	Koss Gina Mistake	Shaima		
2026	Keevve? †	Raafiya		

=== Television ===
Year	Title	Role	Notes	Ref(s)
2003–2004	Vaisoori	Farusha / Sudha	In the segments "Kurin Visnaa Dhevunu Nama" and "An'dhiri Hayaaiy"	
2005	Baiveriyaa	Yumna	Main role; 14 episodes	
2012–2013	Adhives Eloaibah Gadharu Kuran	Mary	Main role	
2015	Vakivumuge Kurin	Raanee	Main role; 15 episodes	
2015–2016	Umurah Salaan	Reesha	Main role; 8 episodes	
2018–2020	Huvaa	Shauna	Main role; 89 episodes	
2019	Hatharu Halha	Aminath "Julie" Habeeba	In the segment Gaathil	
2020	Ehenas	Zeba Muhusin	Guest role; Episode: "Reality Check"	
2023–2024	Yaaraa	Zeyba	Recurring role; 13 episodes	

=== Short film ===
Year	Title	Role	Notes
2024	Eid Mubarak	Herself	

== Discography ==
Year	Album/Film	Song	Lyricist(s)	Co-Artist(s)
2014	Tharinge Rey 2014	"Oagaaverivey Loabivaa"	Mausoom Shakir	Ibrahim Mamdhooh
2023	Loabi Vevijje	"Loabi Vevijje" (Promo song)	Mohamed Abdul Ghanee	Abdullah Shafiu Ibrahim, Ali Seezan, Ahmed Nimal, Ahmed Easa, Ali Azim, Mariyam Azza, Irufana Ibrahim

== Accolades ==
Year	Award	Category	Nominated work	Result	Ref(s)
2014	3rd Maldives Film Awards	Best Female Debut	Dhilakani	Won	
2014	3rd Maldives Film Awards	Best Supporting Actress	Dhilakani	Won	
2025	1st MSPA Film Awards	Best Supporting Actor – Female	Kalhaki	Nominated	
