= Amira Ismail =

Maldivian actress (born 1985)

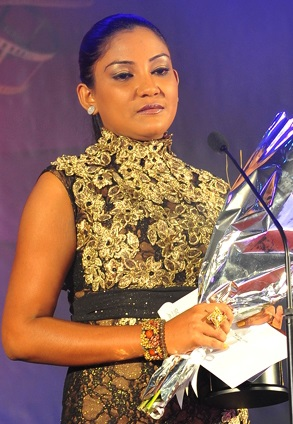
- Ismail at 2nd Maldives Film Awards ceremony, 2012
- Born: 4 October 1985 (age 41); Th. Dhiyamingili
- Occupation: Actress
- Years active: 2003–present
- Spouse: Mohamed Nahyaan (m. 2025)

Amira Ismail (born 4 October 1985) is a Maldivian actress.

== Career ==
Ismail first filmed for a film titled Loabi Dhasvejje which was ultimately delayed and shelved. She then collaborated with Amjad Ibrahim for his romantic horror film Dhonkamana (2003) which depicts the romantic relationship between a young man (played by Yoosuf Shafeeu) and an old woman (played by Fauziyya Hassan). Featuring Hassan, Yoosuf Shafeeu, Niuma Mohamed, Sheereen Abdul Wahid, Sheela Najeeb and Aminath Rasheedha, the film received mainly negative reviews from critics though its inclusion of the theme portraying the relationship between a couple with a large age group was appraised. The same year she appeared as the insecure girlfriend in Abdul Faththaah's critically praised romantic film Vehey Vaarey Therein. Featuring Yoosuf Shafeeu, Jamsheedha Ahmed, Khadheeja Ibrahim Didi, Mohamed Shavin and Aminath Rasheedha in crucial roles, the film narrates the story of unrequited love, and proved to be one of the highest-grossing Maldivian films of the year.

In 2005, Ismail starred alongside Niuma Mohamed, Ali Seezan and Sheereen Abdul Wahid in Ahmed Nimal's horror film Handhu Keytha (2005) which unfolds the story of a man who was enchanted by a spirit while witnessing a lunar eclipse. In the film, she played the comforting sister who helps her sister-in-law dealing with the horrific incidences. Ismail next starred as Nashwa, a domestically abused wife in Yoosuf Shafeeu and Fathimath Nahula's direction, Soora released in 2008. The film was originally released as a television series to positive response.

In 2009, Amira was cast as a school student who has been harassed by a supernatural force in Amjad Ibrahim's romantic horror film Udhabaani featured alongside Yoosuf Shafeeu, Hamid Ali and Aminath Shareef. Upon release, the film received mixed reviews from critics although it performed well at the box office, making it Ibrahim's most successful venture. She again collaborated with Amjad Ibrahim for his horror film Baaraige Fas, cast alongside Hussain Sobah, Mariyam Nisha, Ali Shameel, Mariyam Shakeela and Ahmed Azmeel. The film follows a temptress vampire who goes into a killing spree to quench her thirst. She played the role of Aminath Madheeha, one of the victims of the vampire. The film received mainly negative reviews from critics.

Amira's first release of 2010 was Abdul Fahtah's horror film Jinni alongside Ali Seezan and Mariyam Afeefa. Based on true incidents that occurred in an island of Maldives, she played the fiancé of Javid who has been enthralled by a ghost. Prior to release the film was marketed to be full of "suspense and uniqueness" compared to other mediocre Maldivian horror films. Upon release, the film received mixed reviews from critics; majority of them complaining for having the "same old feeling" of prior horror flicks though the performance were noted to be satisfactory. Despite the mixed reviews, the film witnessed a positive response at the box office, screening a total of twenty two housefull shows in Male', declaring it as a Mega-Hit. Later in 2010, Ismail appeared alongside Yoosuf Shafeeu and Niuma Mohamed in Veeraana, a drama film that deals with child sexual abuse. Directed by Shafeeu, she played the role of Saajila, an impotent wife whose step-daughter has been sexually assaulted by her uncle. The film received mixed to positive reviews from critics; praising the writer and director for touching a condemnatory topic though criticising its "over-the-top melodrama". Her appearance in the film was perceived to be on a "satisfactory" level. Having a strong buzz prior its release, the film was proved to be a commercial success.

Ismail began 2011 in a brief role of Fathimath, a friend of Areeka and Azeem—played by Fathimath Azifa and Ahmed Asim respectively—third-wheeling the couple, in the Moomin Fuad-directed crime tragedy drama Loodhifa. Featuring an ensemble cast, the film deals with current social issues in the society told from different perspectives of the characters. Made on a budget of MVR 600,000, the film was declared a commercial failure though it received wide critical acclaim, praising the performance of cast and the film's "realism" in its language, characters and their attitude. It was followed by Amjad Ibrahim's suspense thriller film Hafaraaiy starred alongside Ali Shameel, Mariyam Shakeela, Yoosuf Shafeeu and Fathimath Fareela, which was a critical and commercial failure. Based on a real incidence, the film narrates a story of a cannibal woman who is addicted to eats human flesh, how she victimised the inhabitants with her face covered in a veil. The film received criticism for its "fragile" plot, "unnecessary" characters though its makeup was appreciated. Ahmed Naif from Sun wrote: "neither scientifically nor psychologically, it has been proven in the film how a chicken addict turns to be a cannibal. The film slides from a suspense thriller to a comedy for its inclusion of inconceivable details". This was followed by a horror film, Mendhamuge Evaguthu (2010) co-written and co-directed by Yoosuf Shafeeu alongside Amjad Ibrahim. It follows a group of ten friends watching a horror film which is being influenced by a narration in it.

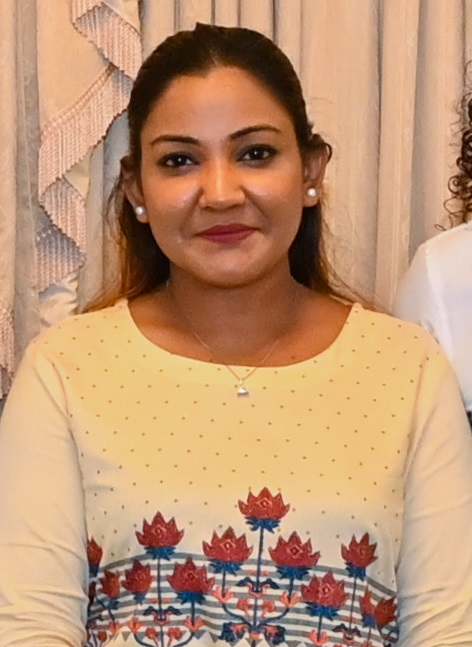
Ismail during her meet with President, 2023

She again collaborated with Amjad Ibrahim to play the role of a school teacher who discovers her husband's secret affair in his family drama Hithey Dheymee (2011) which received negative reviews from critics and was a box office disaster. She next appeared in Yoosuf Shafeeu's family drama E Bappa (2011), featuring an ensemble cast including Hassan Manik, Yoosuf Shafeeu, Mohamed Manik, Sheela Najeeb, Lufshan Shakeeb, Mariyam Shakeela and Fathimath Fareela. A film about fatherhood and how he has been treated by his family, received negative reviews for its "typical stereotype style" and was a box office failure. A series of flop was continued with Hamid Ali's Laelaa starring Yoosuf Shafeeu, Ahmed Easa and Ali opposite her. The film revolves around two daughters who were forced to arranged marriages by their parent. The film and her portrayal of titular role received negative response from critics; "It's time Amira relaxes a bit in emotional scenes, she needs to stop torturing herself and audience when she cries". The film was declared a flop at box office.

Ismail's only release of 2012 was Abdul Faththaah's romantic film Love Story alongside Ali Seezan and Aishath Rishmy. She played Rishfa, the daughter of island chief who falls in love a researcher visiting her island. The film and her performance received negative response from critics. Displeased with the screenplay and performance of the actors, Nadheem of Haveeru wrote: "None of the actors were given scope to build their characters and none was able to justify their character. With excessive emotional scenes, actors were exposed to over-acting and nothing more". He further mentioned Ismail as the worst "cry face and sound" that ruin film scenes. Despite the negative reviews, Ismail received her first Gaumee Film Award nomination for Best Actress. The following year, she starred in a small role in Hussain Munawwar's second direction, revenge thriller film Dhilakani (2013). The film deals with a man's tumultuous journey to seek vengeance and the demolition of family bond over a girl.

In 2014, Ismail starred in Abdul Faththaah's romantic drama Aadheys, alongside Niuma Mohamed, Hussain Sobah, Fathimath Azifa, Moosa Zakariyya and Ali Azim. Filming was completed in 2011, though it was released three years following the death of film producer Hassain Ali. It revolves around a sacrificing mother and her affection towards her child. Upon release, the film received mixed reviews from critics and failed to leave an impression commercially. Ismail Naail reviewing from Vaguthu wrote: "Amira's acting was so fluctuating; some scenes she shines really well while in others she lacks the glamour looking dull and off". At the 8th Gaumee Film Awards she received a Best Supporting Actress nomination for her role in the film.

== Media image ==
In 2011, Ismail was selected in the top five as the "Most Entertaining Actress" in the SunFM Awards 2010, an award night ceremony initiated by Sun Media Group to honour the most recognized personalities in different fields, during the previous year. In 2012, she was ranked at the eighth position in the list of "Best Actresses in Maldives" compiled by Haveeru.

== Personal life ==
On 10 March 2025, Ismail married a real estate agent, Mohamed Nahyaan, after being in a relationship with him for four months.

== Filmography ==
=== Feature film ===
Year	Title	Role	Notes	Ref(s)
2003	Dhonkamana	Anoosha		
2003	Vehey Vaarey Therein	Nareema		
2005	Handhu Keytha	Muna		
2009	Udhabaani	Lathaafa		
2009	Baaraige Fas	Aminath Madheeha		
2010	Mi Hiyy Keekkuraanee?	Zeesha		
2010	Jinni	Nasiha		
2010	Dhin Veynuge Hithaamaigaa	Herself	Special appearance in the song "Annaashey Hinithun Velamaa"	
2010	Veeraana	Saajila		
2010	Mendhamuge Evaguthu	Shaufa		
2011	Loodhifa	Fathimath		
2011	Hafaraaiy	Easha		
2011	Hithey Dheymee	Nadheema		
2011	E Bappa	Sheeza		
2011	Laelaa	Laelaa		
2012	Love Story	Rishfa	Nominated—Gaumee Film Award for Best Actress	
2013	Dhilakani	Muzna	Special appearance	
2014	Aadheys	Zulfa	Nominated—Gaumee Film Award for Best Supporting Actress	
2019	Leena	Zuhoor's mother	Special appearance	
2025	Sorry	Zoona	Special appearance	
2025	Ilzaam	Rasma		
2026	Dhoadhi	Faathuma		
2026	Dhevi			
2027	Dhaleyka †	Amaanee		

=== Television ===
Year	Title	Role	Notes	Ref(s)
2003–2004	Vaisoori	Aroosha	In the segment "Kurin Visnaa Dhevunu Nama"	
2007	Vamey Kaireegaa Kalaa		Main role	
2007	Wafaatheri Nuvevunas		Main role; 26 episodes	
2008	Soora	Nashwa	Main role; 5 episodes	
2008	Umurah Ekee Ulhen Bunefaa	Ramla	Main role	
2009	Ssshhh... Miee Sirreh!	Naazleen	Main role; 5 episodes	
2010	Sirrun Hithaa Kulhelaafa	Shaahzaada	Main role; 10 episodes	
2010	Magey Hithakee Hitheh Noon Hey?	Sameera	Main role; 5 parts	
2012	Case 34	Latheefa Hassan	Main role; Teledrama	
2022	Bridge	Laila	Main role; 10 episodes	
2022	Balgish	Fathun	Main role; 5 episodes	
2024	Yaaraa	Raidha	Guest role; "Episode 50"	
2026	Ekaniveri Hithakun...	Shazuma	Recurring role	

=== Short film ===
Year	Title	Role	Notes	Ref(s)
2009	Dheke Dhekeves 5	Zamra		
2009	Dhanna Nudhanna	Rauna's sister-in-law	Special appearance	
2011	Siyaasee Vaccine	Ishana	Maldives Film Award for Best Actress - Short Film	

== Accolades ==
Year	Award	Category	Nominated work	Result	Ref(s)
2011	2nd SunFM Awards	Most Entertaining Actress		Nominated	
2012	2nd Maldives Film Awards	Best Actress - Short Film	Siyaasee Vaccine	Won	
2016	7th Gaumee Film Awards	Best Actress	Love Story	Nominated	
2017	8th Gaumee Film Awards	Best Supporting Actress	Aadheys	Nominated	
