= Maldives Film Award for Best Director =

- Awarded for: Best Director
- Country: Maldives
- Presented by: Maldives Film Association

The Maldives Film Award for Best Director is given as part of the Maldives Film Awards to a director via a jury. The award was first given in 2011. Here is a list of the award winners and the nominees of the respective award ceremonies, classified by the awarded categories.

== Winners and nominees ==
Table key
Indicates the winner

=== Feature film ===
Year	Photos of winners	Director	Film	Ref(s)
2011 (1st)		Moomin Fuad	Happy Birthday	
2011 (1st)		Ahmed Nimal	E Dharifulhu	
2011 (1st)		Amjad Ibrahim	Baaraige Fas	
2011 (1st)		Fathimath Nahula	Yoosuf	
2011 (1st)		Yoosuf Shafeeu	Loaiybahtakaa	
2012 (2nd)		Niuma Mohamed	Niuma	
2012 (2nd)		Abdul Faththaah	Jinni	
2012 (2nd)		Ali Seezan	Maafeh Neiy	
2012 (2nd)		Moomin Fuad	Loodhifa	
2012 (2nd)		Yoosuf Shafeeu	Insaaf	
2014 (3rd)		Ravee Farooq	Ingili	
2014 (3rd)		Hussain Munawwar	Dhilakani	
2014 (3rd)		Ravee Farooq	Mihashin Furaana Dhandhen	

=== Short film ===
Year	Photos of winners	Director	Film	Ref(s)
2011 (1st)		Ahmed Falah	Faqeeru Koe	
2011 (1st)		No Other Nominee		
2012 (2nd)		Abdulla Muaz	Siyaasee Vaccine	
2012 (2nd)		No Other Nominee		
2014 (3rd)		Abdulla Muaz	Farihibe 4	
2014 (3rd)		Abdulla Muaz	Siyaasee Koalhun	
2014 (3rd)		Abdulla Muaz	13 Ah Visnaa Dhehaas	

== See also ==
- Maldives Film Awards
