= Niuma =

2010 Maldivian drama film

- Official film poster
- Directed by: Niuma Mohamed
- Written by: Niuma Mohamed; Abdulla Muaz
- Screenplay by: Ibrahim Waheed
- Produced by: Mohamed Abdulla
- Starring: Niuma Mohamed; Yoosuf Shafeeu; Mohamed Manik<; Ahmed Nimal; Sheela Najeeb
- Cinematography: Ibrahim Moosa
- Edited by: Abdulla Muaz
- Music by: Mohamed Ikram
- Production company: Dhekedheke Ves Production
- Release date: 25 October 2010
- Country: Maldives
- Language: Dhivehi

Niuma is a 2010 Maldivian drama film directed by Niuma Mohamed. Produced by Mohamed Abdulla under Dhekedheke Ves Production, the film stars Niuma Mohamed, Yoosuf Shafeeu, Ahmed Nimal, Mohamed Manik, and Sheela Najeeb in pivotal roles. The film was released on 25 October 2010. The entire production was shot in B. Goidhoo.

== Plot ==
Nizam (Mohamed Manik), a photographer, has a perversion which makes him sexually attracted to his sister. His younger brother Nihan (Yoosuf Shafeeu) helps their father Nizar (Ahmed Nimal) with his business. Nizar's only daughter, Niuma (Niuma Mohamed), is a reticent girl who doesn't talk often. Nihan's friend Shiyaz (Abdulla Muaz) tries to befriend Niuma. Her mother, Wafiyya (Aminath Rasheedha), disapproves of Niuma talking to Shiyaz. Nihan marries his lover Aminath (Sheela Najeeb) despite his father's dissent.

On her birthday, Aminath discovers Niuma lying on the floor after a suicide attempt. That night, Aminath hears Niuma pleading and fighting with someone. She peeps through the window to discern Nizar leaving Niuma's room. On sharing the news with Nihan, he denies it, saying that Niuma suffers from migraine and her father goes to her room to give her medication. However, Aminath heard Nizar threatening Niuma that if she uttered a word, he would torture and expel her and her mother. Frustrated for not doing anything to thwart his father, Aminath begs Nihan to save Niuma.

Aminath becomes pregnant and she decides to move to her parents' home. Nihan entreats her not to go. That night, Aminath hears Niuma sobbing again. Unable to bear the pain, Aminath leaves the house. After a heated argument between Nihan and Nizam, Niham decides to report the crime, only to be stopped by his mother in fear of being exposed to the rest of the islanders. Shiyaz meets Niuma and proposes to her. Nizar sees them together and punishes her by forcibly cutting her hair. When Shiyaz comes to her house to deliver some goods from the shop, Niuma leaves him a note. She removes her scarf in front of Shiyaz and reveals the way she has been tortured.

The next day, Wafiyya finds out about Niuma's pregnancy and blames it on Shiyaz. The same night, Niuma leaves for India with her father to get an abortion. Rumors start spreading about the pregnancy and about the child's father. Niuma reveals the truth to Shiyaz and he leaves her to her misery. That night, Niuma shaves her head, wears ornaments, and seduces her father, only to brutally murder him with a stick. Afterwards, she walks down the road with the stick in her hand, blood splashed all over her. She goes to the police station. Two police officers visit the house and arrest Nizam.

== Cast ==
- Niuma Mohamed as Niuma
- Yoosuf Shafeeu as Nihan
- Ahmed Nimal as Nizar
- Aminath Rasheedha as Wafiyya
- Sheela Najeeb as Aminath
- Mohamed Manik as Nizam
- Abdulla Muaz as Shiyaz
- Fathimath Azifa as a model (special appearance)

== Soundtrack ==
Track listing
No.	Title	Lyrics	Music	Singer(s)	Length
1.	"Hiyy Dhevijje Kalaayah Huvaa"	Adam Haleem Adnan	Ibrahim Zaid Ali	Ibrahim Zaid Ali, Aishath Maain Rasheed
2.	"Hithugaa Andhaa"	Adam Haleem Adnan	Ibrahim Zaid Ali	Rafiyath Rameeza
3.	"Dheevaana Hiyy"	Mohamed Abdul Ghanee	Ibrahim Zaid Ali	Mohamed Abdul Ghanee, Aminath Shaufa Saeed
4.	"Vindhaa Kulhey"	Mohamed Abdul Ghanee	Ibrahim Zaid Ali	Mohamed Abdul Ghanee, Ibrahim Zaid Ali, Abdulla Nasif, Mariyam Ashfa, Aminath Shaufa Saeed
5.	"Niuma" (Title song)	Mohamed Abdul Ghanee	Ibrahim Zaid Ali	Mariyam Ashfa
6.	"Niuma" (Promotional song)	Mohamed Abdul Ghanee	Ibrahim Zaid Ali	Mohamed Abdul Ghanee, Ibrahim Zaid Ali, Ahmed Ibrahim, Shammoon Mohamed

== Release and response ==
Upon release, the film received widespread acclaim from critics, praising the performance of actors and the dialogues by Ibrahim Waheed. Ahmed Nadheem from Haveeru wrote: "the film is thoroughly enjoyable. The memorable performances, awesome dialogue forced me to book another show of the film". Ahmed Naif from Sun echoed similar sentiments, though he criticized the colour exposure of the film while praising the performance of the actors: "Niuma's acting is the best I have seen from a Maldivian film. In the scene where Nimal cuts her hair, she brought the perfect expression and emotions to it, nobody else could have justified the role the way she did". The film was declared a megahit at the box office, and the highest-grossing Maldivian release of the year.

== Accolades ==
Award	Category	Recipients	Result	Ref.
2nd Maldives Film Awards	Best Film	Niuma	Nominated	
2nd Maldives Film Awards	Best Director	Niuma Mohamed	Won	
2nd Maldives Film Awards	Best Actor	Ahmed Nimal	Nominated	
2nd Maldives Film Awards	Best Actress	Niuma Mohamed	Won	
2nd Maldives Film Awards	Best Supporting Actress	Sheela Najeeb	Won	
2nd Maldives Film Awards	Best Supporting Actress	Aminath Rasheedha	Nominated	
2nd Maldives Film Awards	Best Editing	Abdulla Muaz	Won	
2nd Maldives Film Awards	Best Makeup	Mohamed Manik	Won	
6th Gaumee Film Awards	Best Film	Niuma	Nominated	
6th Gaumee Film Awards	Best Director	Niuma Mohamed	Nominated	
6th Gaumee Film Awards	Best Actor	Ahmed Nimal	Nominated	
6th Gaumee Film Awards	Best Actress	Niuma Mohamed	Won	
6th Gaumee Film Awards	Best Supporting Actor	Abdulla Muaz	Won	
6th Gaumee Film Awards	Best Supporting Actress	Sheela Najeeb	Nominated	
6th Gaumee Film Awards	Best Supporting Actress	Aminath Rasheedha	Nominated	
6th Gaumee Film Awards	Best Lyricist	Adam Haleem Adnan for "Hiyy Dhevijjey"	Won	
6th Gaumee Film Awards	Best Female Playback Singer	Mariyam Ashfa for "Niuma"	Nominated	
6th Gaumee Film Awards	Best Female Playback Singer	Maain Rasheed for "Hiyy Dhevijjey"	Nominated	
6th Gaumee Film Awards	Best Editing	Abdulla Muaz	Nominated	
6th Gaumee Film Awards	Best Cinematography	Ibrahim Moosa	Nominated	
6th Gaumee Film Awards	Best Screenplay	Ibrahim Waheed	Nominated	
6th Gaumee Film Awards	Best Background Music	Mohamed Ikram	Won	
6th Gaumee Film Awards	Best Sound Editing	Mohamed Ikram	Nominated	
6th Gaumee Film Awards	Best Sound Mixing	Mohamed Ikram	Nominated	
6th Gaumee Film Awards	Best Art Direction	Ibrahim Moosa	Nominated	
6th Gaumee Film Awards	Best Choreography	Yoosuf Shafeeu for "Hiyy Dhevijjey"	Nominated	
6th Gaumee Film Awards	Best Makeup	Mohamed Manik	Won	
