= Maldives Film Award for Best Actress =

- Awarded for: Best Actress
- Country: Maldives
- Presented by: Maldives Film Association

The Maldives Film Award for Best Actress is given as part of the Maldives Film Awards to an actress via a jury. The award was first given in 2011. Here is a list of the award winners and the nominees of the respective award ceremonies, classified by the awarded categories.

== Winners and nominees ==
Table key
Indicates the winner

=== Feature film ===
Year	Photos of winners	Actress	Film	Ref(s)
2011 (1st)		Niuma Mohamed	Yoosuf	
2011 (1st)		Mariyam Nisha	Baaraige Fas	
2011 (1st)		Niuma Mohamed	E Dharifulhu	
2011 (1st)		Niuma Mohamed	Hiyy Rohvaanulaa	
2011 (1st)		Sheela Najeeb	E Dharifulhu	
2012 (2nd)		Niuma Mohamed	Niuma	
2012 (2nd)		Fathimath Azifa	Loodhifa	
2012 (2nd)		Mariyam Afeefa	Loodhifa	
2012 (2nd)		Mariyam Afeefa	Jinni	
2012 (2nd)		Niuma Mohamed	Maafeh Neiy	
2014 (3rd)		Niuma Mohamed	Dhilakani	
2014 (3rd)		Fathimath Fareela	Fathis Handhuvaruge Feshun 3D	
2014 (3rd)		Niuma Mohamed	Mihashin Furaana Dhandhen	

=== Short film ===
Year	Photos of winners	Actor	Film	Ref(s)
2011 (1st)		Sheela Najeeb	Faqeeru Koe	
2011 (1st)		No Other Nominee		
2012 (2nd)		Amira Ismail	Siyaasee Vaccine	
2012 (2nd)		No Other Nominee		
2014 (3rd)		Fathimath Azifa	Farihibe 4	
2014 (3rd)		Zeenath Abbas	Siyaasee Koalhun	
2014 (3rd)		Niuma Mohamed	13 Ah Visnaa Dhehaas	

== See also ==
- Maldives Film Awards
