= Baaraige Fas =

- Official film poster
- Directed by: Amjad Ibrahim
- Written by: Ibrahim Waheed
- Screenplay by: Amjad Ibrahim
- Produced by: Hussain Sobah
- Starring: Mariyam Nisha; Hussain Sobah; Amira Ismail
- Cinematography: Ibrahim Riyaz; Mohamed Shuau
- Edited by: Ibrahim Riyaz; Hussain Solah; Mohamed Shuau; Ahmed Ziya
- Music by: Hussain Sobah
- Production company: Eleven Eleven Productions
- Release date: 2009
- Running time: 176 minutes
- Country: Maldives
- Language: Dhivehi

Baaraige Fas is a 2009 Maldivian horror film directed by Amjad Ibrahim. Produced by Hassan Sobah under Eleven Eleven Productions, the film stars Mariyam Nisha, Hussain Sobah, Ali Shameel, Mariyam Shakeela, Amira Ismail and Ahmed Azmeel in pivotal roles.

== Plotline ==
A female vampire, Afeefa (Mariyam Nisha) goes wandering around the island on her own while seducing a man into her trap and finally killing him. A journalist (Hussain Sobah) was assigned to prepare a news report on the incident. Afeefa, being an undergraduate, later joins a tuition center where she sucked the blood out of her classmate, Aminath Madheeha (Amira Ismail) when she see accidentally got a small cut on her neck. Afeefa's father, Nizar (Ali Shameel) buried Madheeha's body while her disappearance was reported on television and radio. Madheeha's friend, Naveen (Hussain Solah) suspects Afeefa's involvement in her disappearance since she was the last to be seen with her. In order to quench her thirst, Afeefa goes into a killing spree.

== Cast ==
- Hussain Sobah as Ziyad
- Mariyam Nisha as Afeefa
- Ali Shameel as Nizar
- Mariyam Shakeela as Samiya
- Hussain Solah as Naveen
- Amira Ismail as Aminath Madheeha
- Ahmed Azmeel as Adheel
- Ahmed Shah as Shafiu; Afeefa's victim
- Mariyam Shahuza as Aishath

== Soundtrack ==
Track listing
| No. | Title | Music | Singer(s) | Length |
|---|---|---|---|---|
| 1. | "Fenifaa Zuvaan Thibaaya" | Hussain Sobah | Mohamed Farhad, Moonisa Khaleel |
| 2. | "Hiyy Edhey Moonakee" | Hussain Sobah | Fathimath Zoona, Mumthaz Moosa |
| 3. | "Kalaa Thihen Balaa Gothun" | Hussain Sobah | Hassan Jalaal, Shaheedha Mohamed |
| 4. | "Thi loabi Noon" | Hussain Sobah | Abdul Baaree, Shifa Thaufeeq |
| 5. | "Baaraige Fas" | Hussain Sobah | Mumthaz Moosa, Shaheedha Mohamed |
| 6. | "Mithuraage Moonaa Thi Soorayaa" | Hussain Sobah | Mumthaz Moosa, Lileetha Massoodh |

== Accolades ==
| Year | Award | Category | Recipients | Result | Ref. |
|---|---|---|---|---|---|
| 2011 | 1st Maldives Film Awards | Best Film | Baaraige Fas | Nominated | |
| 2011 | 1st Maldives Film Awards | Best Director | Amjad Ibrahim | Nominated | |
| 2011 | 1st Maldives Film Awards | Best Actress | Mariyam Nisha | Nominated | |
