= 1st Maldives Film Awards =

ROHIT SHAITY HOST

- Date: 2 July 2011

Highlights
- Best Film: Happy Birthday
- Most awards: Happy Birthday (12)

1st Maldives Film Awards ceremony, presented by the Maldives Film Association, honored the best Maldivian films released in 2008 and 2009. Nominations for the major categories were announced on 8 April 2011. The ceremony was held on 2 July 2011.

== Feature film ==
Best Film	Best Director
Happy Birthday; Baaraige Fas; E Dharifulhu; Yoosuf; Loaiybahtakaa	Moomin Fuad – Happy Birthday; Amjad Ibrahim – Baaraige Fas; Ahmed Nimal – E Dharifulhu; Fathimath Nahula – Yoosuf; Yoosuf Shafeeu – Loaiybahtakaa
Best Actor	Best Actress
Yoosuf Shafeeu – Happy Birthday; Mohamed Manik – E Dharifulhu; Yoosuf Shafeeu – E Dharifulhu; Yoosuf Shafeeu – Yoosuf; Mohamed Faisal – Loaiybahtakaa	Niuma Mohamed – Yoosuf; Mariyam Nisha – Baaraige Fas; Niuma Mohamed – E Dharifulhu; Sheela Najeeb – E Dharifulhu; Niuma Mohamed – Hiyy Rohvaanulaa
Best Supporting Actor	Best Supporting Actress
Abdulla Muaz – Hiyy Rohvaanulaa	Sheela Najeeb – Yoosuf
Best Male Playback Singer	Best Female Playback Singer
Mohamed Abdul Ghanee - "Hairaan Vaahaa" - Yoosuf	Mariyam Unoosha - "Haadha Dhahivethi" - Khalaas; Aishath Maain Rasheed - "Loabin Thi Hiyy Hiba Kohfinama" - Udhabaani
Best Film of the Year (Viewer's Choice)	Best Screenplay
Yoosuf	Moomin Fuad – Happy Birthday
Best Make-up	Best Choreographer
Mohamed Manik – E Dharifulhu	Ali Seezan - "Haadha Dhahivethi Belumekey" - Khalaas; Yoosuf Shafeeu, Abdulla Muaz - "Haa Ufaa" - Hiyy Rohvaanulaa; Ahmed Fizam - "Ey Yaara" - E Dharifulhu; Mohamed Manik - "Vindhu Hithaa" - E Dharifulhu; Mohamed Manik - "Hiyy Mi Edhey" - E Dharifulhu
Best Art Direction	Best Lyrics
Ali Shifau, Moomin Fuad – Happy Birthday	Mausoom Shakir - "Shakuvaa" - Yoosuf
Best Debutant (Male)	Best Child Artist
Ahmed Lais Asim – Yoosuf	Ahmed Lais Asim – Yoosuf; Ismail Nuwail – Happy Birthday; Shaifan Shaheem – Loaiybahtakaa
Best Original Song	Best Cinematographer
Moomin Fuad - "Shakuvaa" - Happy Birthday	Moomin Fuad – Happy Birthday
Best Sound Editing	Best Sound Mixing
Ali Shifau – Happy Birthday	Ali Shifau, Moomin Fuad – Happy Birthday
Best Editing	Best Original Score
Ali Shifau – Happy Birthday	Shaaz Saeed, Abdul Basith – Happy Birthday
Best Costume Designer
Ibrahim Ali, Aminath Hassan – Happy Birthday

== Short film ==
Best Film	Best Director
Faqeeru Koe	Ahmed Falah – Faqeeru Koe
Best Actor	Best Actress
Mohamed Abdulla – Faqeeru Koe	Sheela Najeeb – Faqeeru Koe

== Special awards ==
Lifetime Achievement Award
- Roanu Hassan Manik

== Most wins ==
- Happy Birthday - 12
- Yoosuf - 7

== See also ==
- Maldives Film Awards
