= Loodhifa =

- Official film poster
- Directed by: Moomin Fuad
- Written by: Moomin Fuad
- Screenplay by: Moomin Fuad
- Produced by: Hussain Nooradeen
- Cinematography: Hussain Munawwar
- Edited by: Ahmed Asim
- Music by: Mohamed Ikram
- Production company: Noor N Movies
- Release date: February 14, 2011
- Country: Maldives
- Language: Dhivehi

Loodhifa (transl. Slipped) is a 2011 Maldivian crime tragedy drama film written and directed by Moomin Fuad. Produced by Hussain Nooradeen under Noor N Movies, the film stars an ensemble cast including Ismail Rasheed, Mohamed Rasheed, Ravee Farooq, Mariyam Afeefa and Fathimath Azifa in pivotal roles. The film was released on 13 February 2011. The film deals with current social issues in the society told from different perspectives of the characters. Prior to release, the film is marketed to be one of the most bold and risky movies released in the industry.

== Cast ==
- Mohamed Rasheed as Mohamed Jaleel
- Mariyam Shakeela as Zahira
- Ismail Rasheed as Nashid
- Khadheeja Ibrahim Didi as Afiya
- Ravee Farooq as Imran
- Mariyam Afeefa as Sherin
- Ahmed Asim as Azeem
- Fathimath Azifa as Areeka
- Ali Waheed as Amjad
- Ahmed Shiham as Shaante
- Ahmed Saeed as Junaid
- Fathimath Nashfa as Shifza
- Hussain Munawwar as Thomas
- Mariyam Nisha as Shaira
- Fauziyya Hassan
- Neena Saleem as Aishath
- Nashidha Mohamed as Zuley
- Nadhiya Hassan as Minna
- Ahmed Fizam as Suja
- Nashidha Mohamed as Fazu
- Arifa Ibrahim as Saudhiyya
- Aminath Shareef as Faheema
- Ali Shameel as Saleem
- Amira Ismail as Fathimath
- Lufshan Shakeeb as Sappe
- Ahmed Ziya as Jinatte

== Soundtrack ==
Track listing
No.	Title	Lyrics	Music	Singer(s)	Length
1.	"Nethifana" (Promotional song)	Mohamed Abdul Ghanee	Mohamed Fuad	Mariyam Unoosha, Mohamed Fuad	3:10
2.	"Kaamiyaabey"	Mohamed Abdul Ghanee	Mohamed Fuad	Mohamed Fuad

== Release and reception ==
The film was released on 13 February 2011. Upon release, the film received widespread critical acclaim. A review from the Sun praised the performance of cast and the film's "realism" in its language, characters and their attitude. Saluting the production team for making this attempt, they wrote: "Loodhifa is a very realistic bold movie which represents the dark side of our community today taking a good advantage of the concept". However, it was criticised for its length; "some scenes can be easily cut off. Beside the editing, there is nothing imperfect about the film to be noted".

== Accolades ==
Award	Category	Recipients	Result	Ref.
2nd Maldives Film Awards	Best Film	Loodhifa	Won	
2nd Maldives Film Awards	Best Film (Viewers' Choice)	Loodhifa	Won	
2nd Maldives Film Awards	Best Director	Moomin Fuad	Nominated	
2nd Maldives Film Awards	Best Actor	Ismail Rasheed	Won	
2nd Maldives Film Awards	Best Actress	Mariyam Afeefa	Nominated	
2nd Maldives Film Awards	Best Actress	Fathimath Azifa	Nominated	
2nd Maldives Film Awards	Best Supporting Actor	Ahmed Asim	Nominated	
2nd Maldives Film Awards	Best Supporting Actress	Khadheeja Ibrahim Didi	Nominated	
2nd Maldives Film Awards	Best Editing	Ahmed Asim	Nominated	
2nd Maldives Film Awards	Best Female Debut	Fathimath Nashfa	Won	
2nd Maldives Film Awards	Best Art Direction	Moomin Fuad, Ismail Rasheed, Hussain Munawwar	Won	
2nd Maldives Film Awards	Best Costume Design	Aminath Naseera	Won	
7th Gaumee Film Awards	Best Film	Loodhifa	Won	
7th Gaumee Film Awards	Best Director	Moomin Fuad	Won	
7th Gaumee Film Awards	Best Actor	Ismail Rasheed	Won	
7th Gaumee Film Awards	Best Actress	Mariyam Afeefa	Won	
7th Gaumee Film Awards	Best Supporting Actor	Ravee Farooq	Won	
7th Gaumee Film Awards	Best Supporting Actress	Fathimath Azifa	Won	
7th Gaumee Film Awards	Best Supporting Actress	Khadheeja Ibrahim Didi	Nominated	
7th Gaumee Film Awards	Best Original Song	Moomin Fuad	Won	
7th Gaumee Film Awards	Best Lyricist	Mohamed Abdul Ghanee	Nominated	
7th Gaumee Film Awards	Best Editing	Ahmed Asim	Nominated	
7th Gaumee Film Awards	Best Cinematography	Hussain Munawwar	Nominated	
7th Gaumee Film Awards	Best Screenplay	Moomin Fuad	Won	
7th Gaumee Film Awards	Best Background Music	Mohamed Ikram	Nominated	
7th Gaumee Film Awards	Best Sound Editing	Haisham Shafeeq	Won	
7th Gaumee Film Awards	Best Sound Mixing	Haisham Shafeeq	Won	
7th Gaumee Film Awards	Best Art Direction	Moomin Fuad, Hussain Munawwar, Ismail Rasheed	Won	
7th Gaumee Film Awards	Best Costume Design	Aminath Nasreena, Ahmed Saeed	Won	
7th Gaumee Film Awards	Best Makeup	Fathimath Azifa	Nominated	
7th Gaumee Film Awards	Best Visual Effects	Ahmed Shiham	Nominated	
