= Hussain Munawwar =

Maldivian director and actor

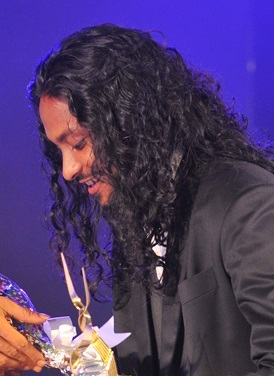
- Munawwar at 2nd Maldives Film Awards ceremony, 2012
- Born: 5 February 1988 (age 38); GA. Kolamaafushi, Maldives
- Occupations: Director, cinematographer, producer, actor
- Years active: 2006–present
- Spouse: Rishfa Abdul Samad
- Children: Kayan Hussain Munawwar; Kiyaan Hussain Munawwar; Kainaa Hussain Munawwar

Hussain Munawwar (born 5 February 1998), commonly known as Kuda Foolhu is a Maldivian film director, cinematographer, producer and actor.

== Career ==
In 2006, Munawwar starred as the character Kudafoolhu, a manipulative devil under the strict instructions of his master, in the first installment of Yoosuf Shafeeu-directed short film series, Vasvaas which proved to be a breakthrough for him with his humorous and child-friendly act. He reprised the role in several of his other ventures including Kudafoolhuge Vasvaas (2006) and Kudafoolhaai Paree Dhahtha (2007). His performance in playing the character fetched him a Maldives Film Award for Best Actor in short films category.

In 2011, Munawwar starred as gangster in the Moomin Fuad-directed crime tragedy drama Loodhifa. Featuring an ensemble cast, the film deals with modern social issues in society told from the different perspectives of the characters. Made on a budget of MVR 600,000, the film was declared a commercial failure though it received wide critical acclaim. He made his directorial debut with the romantic drama film Sazaa, featuring Ismail Rasheed, Niuma Mohamed and Lufshan Shakeeb. The story revolves around a carefree woman whose life is turned upside down when she is forced to marry a brutal man. His debut as a director was appreciated by the critics and emerged as a commercial success. At the 7th Gaumee Film Awards ceremony, Munawwar was bestowed with the Best Cinematographer award for Sazaa while being nominated in the same category for Loodhifa (2011) and Ingili (2013).

Following the success of Sazaa, Munawwar directed his second feature film, Dhilakani which stars Ismail Rasheed, Niuma Mohamed, Mohamed Manik, Aminath Rishfa and Mohamed Faisal in main roles. The film which deals with a man's tumultuous journey to seek vengeance, his undoing and his eventual redemption from an unlikeliest of sources, received negative reception from critics. Ahmed Nadheem from Haveeru wrote: "The film is similar to a ship without a direction, an aimless screenplay leading the director to no path. Embraced with futile characters, impractical scenes and out-dated music, the film has problems in each department". Despite the negative reviews, Munawwar received a nomination as the Best Director at the 3rd Maldives Film Awards.

In 2016, Munawwar directed the film Neyngi Yaaru Vakivee featuring Ahmed Azmeel, Maleeha Waheed, Ismail Jumaih and Aminath Rishfa. Critics gave the film negative reviews, considering it a "boring" and "forced" attempt at film production. Despite the negative reviews, the film did average business at the end of its theatrical run.

== Filmography ==
=== Feature film ===
Year	Title	Role	Notes	Ref(s)
2011	Loodhifa	Thomas	Also the cinematographer	

=== Television ===
Year	Title	Role	Notes	Ref(s)
2004	Kamana Vareh Neiy	Hussain	Recurring role; 3 episodes	

=== Short film ===
Year	Title	Role	Notes	Ref(s)
2006	Vasvaas 1	Kudafoolhu		
2006	Kudafoolhuge Vasvaas	Kudafoolhu		
2007	Kudafoolhaai Paree Dhahtha	Kudafoolhu		
2007	Paneeno	Paneeno		
2010	Kudafoolhu	Kudafoolhu		

=== Other work ===
Year	Title	Director	Producer	Camera	Editing	Notes	Ref(s)
2006	Kudafoolhuge Vasvaas		Yes		Yes	Short film	
2007	Kudafoolhaai Paree Dhahtha		Yes			Short film	
2007	Paneeno		Yes		Yes	Short film; Also the co-writer	
2007	Umurah Salaam			Yes	Yes	Short film	
2008	Prince of Madagaskara			Yes		Short film	
2009	01 January			Yes		Short film	
2010	Veeraana			Yes		Feature film	
2011	Loodhifa			Yes		Feature film	
2011	Sazaa	Yes		Yes		Feature film	
2011	Wathan			Yes		Feature film	
2012	Dhirumeh Nethas				Yes	Television series; 5 episodes	
2013	Ingili		Yes	Yes		Feature film	
2013	Dhilakani	Yes				Feature film	
2016	Bithufangi 2			Yes		Television series; 13 episodes	
2016	Neyngi Yaaru Vakivee	Yes	Yes	Yes		Feature film	
2016	Vee Beyvafa		Yes			Feature film	
2017	Bandharu			Yes		Office drama	
2019	Shhh		Yes			Web series; 5 episodes	
2020	Hanaa		Yes	Yes		Web series; 13 episodes	
2024	Kamanaa	Yes	Yes			Feature film	
2025	Kan'bulo	Yes	Yes			Feature film	

== Discography ==
Year	Film/album	Song	Lyricist(s)	Co-artist(s)
2007	Kudafoolhaai Paree Dhahtha	"Kuda Foolhaa"		Imad Ismail

== Accolades ==
Year	Award	Category	Nominated work	Result	Ref(s)
2012	2nd Maldives Film Awards	Best Art Direction	Loodhifa (Shared with Moomin Fuad and Ismail Rasheed)	Won	
2012	2nd Maldives Film Awards	Best Actor - Short Film	Kudafoolhu	Won	
2014	3rd Maldives Film Awards	Best Director	Dhilakani	Nominated	
2014	3rd Maldives Film Awards	Best Art Direction	Ingili (Shared with Ravee Farooq and Mahdi Ahmed)	Won	
2014	3rd Maldives Film Awards	Best Art Direction	Dhilakani (Shared with Hassan Shiyam)	Nominated	
2014	3rd Maldives Film Awards	Best Cinematography	Ingili	Won	
2016	7th Gaumee Film Awards	Best Director	Sazaa	Nominated	
2016	7th Gaumee Film Awards	Best Cinematography	Sazaa	Won	
2016	7th Gaumee Film Awards	Best Cinematography	Ingili	Nominated	
2016	7th Gaumee Film Awards	Best Cinematography	Loodhifa	Nominated	
2016	7th Gaumee Film Awards	Best Art Direction	Loodhifa (Shared with Moomin Fuad and Ismail Rasheed)	Won	
2016	7th Gaumee Film Awards	Best Art Direction	Ingili (Shared with Ravee Farooq and Mahdi Ahmed)	Nominated	
2016	7th Gaumee Film Awards	Best Art Direction	Sazaa	Nominated	
2016	7th Gaumee Film Awards	Best Costume Design	Sazaa	Nominated	
2025	5th Karnataka International Film Festival	Best Director	Kamanaa	Won	
