= Mohamed Manik =

Maldivian actor and director

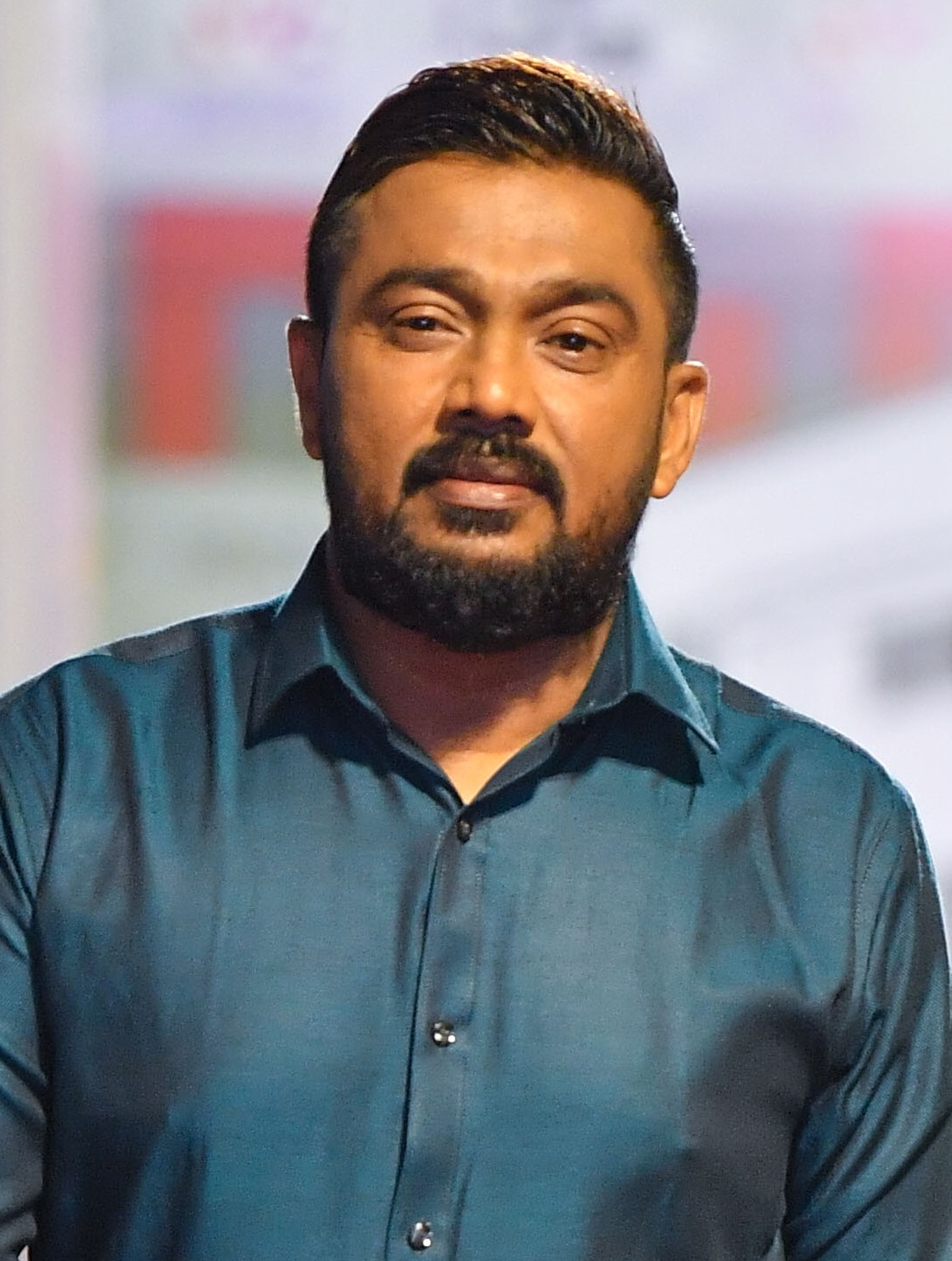
- Manik attending Olympus reopening ceremony, 2023
- Born: 15 October 1969 (age 57); Male', Maldives
- Occupations: Actor, director
- Years active: 1995–present
- Spouse: Sheela Najeeb (m. 2004)
- Children: 3

Mohamed Manik (15 October 1969) is a Maldivian film actor, director and makeup artist.

== Career ==
=== 2002–10: Critical acclaim and breakthrough ===
Manik rose to fame and prominence in the television industry and was applauded for his performance in a dual role, Ahmed Ayaz and Mohamed Adheel, in the Abdul Faththaah-directed critically acclaimed television series, Thiyey Mihithuge Vindhakee (2003) which was considered as one of the best series production in television industry.

Fattah's horror film Eynaa was released in 2004, which appears Sheela Najeeb, Manik, Ahmed Shah, Khadheeja Ibrahim Didi, Ibrahim Jihad and Nashidha Mohamed as six colleagues who go on a picnic to a haunted uninhabited island and their battle for survival. The film garnered critical appreciation specially for its technical department and was a commercial success. At 4th Gaumee Film Awards ceremony, Manik was nominated as the Best Actor for his performance in the film.

Manik collaborated for the first with Fathimath Nahula in the critically appreciated and commercially prosperous project, a romantic drama film Zuleykha (2005) which narrates the journey of a nine years old girl seeking the lost love of her mother. Featuring an ensemble cast including Yoosuf Shafeeu, Mariyam Nisha, Ali Seezan, Sheela Najeeb and Mariyam Enash Sinan, Manik played the role of a father who loses his only child, which fetched him a Gaumee Film Award nomination as the Best Supporting Actor while winning a Miadhu Crystal Award in the same category. Thirty three housefull shows of the film were screened at the cinema making it the highest grossing Maldivian release of the year. This was followed by Amjad Ibrahim's romantic drama film Hithuge Edhun (2006) which narrates the story of a disabled man. Manik played the role of Shahil, an unfaithful husband who was later partially-paralyzed by a stroke, which resulted in another Gaumee Film Award nomination as the Best Actor.

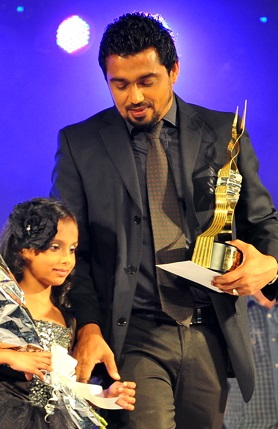
Mohamed at 2nd Maldives Film Awards ceremony with his daughter, 2012

In 2008, Manik appeared in Fathimath Nahula's romantic drama film, Yoosuf which depicts the story of a deaf and mute man (played by Yoosuf Shafeeu) who has been mistreated by a wealthy family, mocking his disability. Featuring an ensemble cast including Yoosuf Shafeeu, Niuma Mohamed, Sheela Najeeb, Ahmed Nimal, Fauziyya Hassan, Ravee Farooq, Zeenath Abbas and Ahmed Lais Asim, the film is considered to include most prominent faces in a Maldivian film. The film received widespread critical acclaim and was attained a blockbuster status at box office. A total of forty five housefull shows were screened at Olympus Cinema before the film was leaked online, however the producers were able to screen five more shows at the cinema making it one of the Maldivian all-time highest grossing movies. The film was Maldivian official entry at 2009 SAARC Film Festivals and holds the privilege of being the opening movie of the festival.

Manik played the kind-hearted boyfriend, in Ahmed Nimal-directed family drama film E Dharifulhu (2009) featuring an ensemble cast including Niuma Mohamed, Yoosuf Shafeeu, Sheela Najeeb and Ahmed Nimal. At 1st Maldives Film Awards, Manik received his first nomination as Best Actor for his performance in the film while winning the Best Makeup award for the same film. He also received two nominations for the Best Choreography; "Vindhu Hithaa" and "Hiyy Mi Edhey".

Manik's first release of 2010 was Ali Shifau-directed family drama Dhin Veynuge Hithaamaigaa where he played the role of Nahees, a caring and devoted father/doctor whose priority was to ensure the well-being of his only daughter. The film showcases discrimination against the islanders, family revenge and fatherhood responsibilities. The film and his performance received positive response from critics. The film was believed to be a "huge improvement" over the recent Maldivian films. Being able to screen fifteen housefull shows of the film, it was declared to be a commercial success. He next starred opposite Sheela Najeeb and Yoosuf Shafeeu in Ahmed Nimal's horror film Zalzalaa En'buri Aun (2010). It was a spin-off to Aslam Rasheed's horror classic film Zalzalaa (2000) starring, Ibrahim Wisan, Ali Shameel and Niuma Mohamed. The film revolves around a mariage blanc, a murder of husband by his wife with secret lover and avenging of his death from everyone involved in the crime. He played the role of Sharim, a greedy doctor, who falls in love with his patient and execute her husband for money. The film received mixed response from critics and it did average business at box office. At the 6th Gaumee Film Awards, Mohamed received Best Supporting Actor award nomination for his performance in the film.

He next starred in Niuma Mohamed's directorial debut drama film Niuma (2010) alongside an ensemble cast including Mohamed, Yoosuf Shafeeu, Sheela Najeeb, Aminath Rasheedha and Abdulla Muaz. He played the role of Nizam, a pervert who sexually abuses his own younger sister. Upon release, the film met with widespread critical acclaim specifically complimenting the performance of actors and its dialogues. Ahmed Nadheem from Haveeru wrote: "If another actor has played the role of Nizam, I can assure you that, the consistency and power will be missing from the performance. Manik has justified his character the best anyone ever can". Being able to screen over thirty housefull shows of the film, it was declared a Mega-Hit at box office, and the highest grossing Maldivian release of the year. He also worked as the makeup artist of the film. His work was praised by Ahmed Naif from Sun; "Manik deserves all approbation for his work to bring the required emotions and sentiments through makeup. He exposed Niuma's idleness and sorrowful life with perfect makeup. He was bestowed with the Best Makeup award at the 6th Gaumee Film Awards ceremony and 2nd Maldives Film Awards and. The same year he directed a 4-episodes romantic television mini-series titled Thiya Loabeegai Abadhahme Vaanamey starring opposite Sheela Najeeb and Nadhiya Hassan.

=== 2011–present: Experiment with different genres ===
The following year Manik featured in a small role in Ali Shifau's psychological romantic thriller Zaharu (2011) alongside Ali Seezan, Niuma Mohamed and Sheela Najeeb. The film centers on a married man who has a weekend affair with a woman who refuses to allow it to end and becomes obsessed with him. The film is inspired from Adrian Lyne-directed American psychological erotic thriller film Fatal Attraction (1987). Upon release the film received mixed response from critics and was declared a "flop" at box office. He then appeared in Yoosuf Shafeeu's family drama E Bappa (2011), featuring an ensemble cast including Hassan Manik, Yoosuf Shafeeu, Sheela Najeeb, Amira Ismail, Lufshan Shakeeb, Mariyam Shakeela and Fathimath Fareela. A film about fatherhood and how he has been treated by his family, received negative reviews for its "typical stereotype style" and was a box office failure. Last release of the year featured Manik in a negative role as Mac in Yoosuf Shafeeu-directed action drama film Insaaf (2011). The film revolves around the disputes between two districts of an island. Upon release, the film received mixed to positive reviews from critics while Ahmed Nadheem from Haveeru praised the performance of Manik.

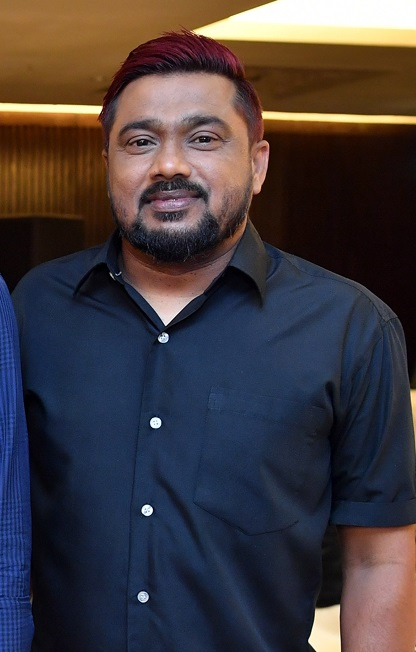
Manik at Niuma Mohamed's Silver Jubilee celebration event, 2019

In 2012, Manik starred in Ravee Farooq-directed romantic drama film Mihashin Furaana Dhandhen opposite Niuma Mohamed. Upon release, the film received mixed response from critics while his performance was recognised positively. Ahmed Nadheem of Haveeru noted the film as "the best Maldivian melodramatic film" he had seen in the past two years, though displeased with its similarities between two Bollywood films. It was followed by Abdul Fattah's romantic film Love Story alongside Ali Seezan, Amira Ismail and Aishath Rishmy. The film received negative response from critics. Displeased with the screenplay and performance of the actors, Ahmed Nadheem of Haveeru wrote: "None of the actors were given scope to build their characters and none was able to justify their character. With excessive emotional scenes, actors were exposed to over-acting and nothing more".

The following year, Manik collaborated with Hussain Munawwar for his second direction, revenge thriller film Dhilakani (2013) along with Ismail Rasheed, Niuma Mohamed, Mohamed Faisal and Aminath Rishfa. The film deals with a man's tumultuous journey to seek vengeance and the demolition of family bond over a girl. He played a politician trying to end the bloodshed in the society. The film attracted negative reception from critics while Nadheem wrote: "Embraced with futile characters, impractical scenes and out-dated music, the film has problems in each department. Munawwar failed to extract the talent of actors like [Mohamed Manik] who is one of the most accomplished actors in the industry". At the 3rd Maldives Film Awards, Mohamed was nominated as the Best Actor and Makeup artist for his work in the film.

In 2015, Manik appeared in the Ali Shifau-directed romantic film Emme Fahu Vindha Jehendhen alongside Mohamed Jumayyil and Mariyam Majudha. In a pre-premiere review from Vaguthu, Ismail Nail praised his acting skills along with that of Sheela Najeeb's. The film was the highest grossing Maldivian film of the year, and was a commercial success. Following this, he played the dual role of Ahmed Fazeel and Mohamed Saleem, a man who becomes afflicted with "Post Traumatic Amnesia", in the Ravee Farooq-directed film Mikoe Bappa Baey Baey opposite Aishath Rishmy. The film along with his performance was critically acclaimed. It was one of the three entries from the Maldives to the SAARC Film Festival in 2016.

In 2017, Manik featured in Ali Shifau-directed romantic comedy Mee Loaybakee alongside Mohamed Jumayyil and Mariyam Azza. The film which is considered to include the largest cast in a Maldivian feature film, narrates the story of two ex-lovers sliding into the friend zone with the envy and diffidence they experience amidst a convoluted love-triangle. The film and his performance as an office boss received mainly positive reviews from critics. The film emerged as one of the highest grossing Maldivian films of 2017. He next featured alongside an ensemble cast including Yoosuf Shafeeu, Fathimath Azifa, Ahmed Saeed and Ali Seezan in the romantic comedy film Naughty 40 which was directed by Shafeeu. The film revolves around three friends, Ashwanee, Ahsan and Ajwad (Played by Shafeeu, Saeed and Manik respectively) who are single and having a youthful outlook, in spite of being in their forties. The film met with both critical and commercial success, emerging as one of the highest grossing Maldivian films of 2017. He reprised the role in the horror comedy film 40+ (2019), a sequel to 2017 released comedy film Naughty 40, which was well received both critically and commercially.

== Media image ==
In 2011, Manik was voted in the top three as the "Most Entertaining Actor" in the SunFM Awards 2010, an award night ceremony initiated by Sun Media Group to honour the most recognized personalities in different fields, during the previous year. In 2018, he was ranked in the fourth position from Dho?'s list of Top Ten Actor of Maldives.

== Filmography ==
=== Feature film ===
Year	Title	Role	Notes	Ref(s)
2004	Eynaa	Nihan	Nominated—Gaumee Film Award for Best Actor	
2005	Zuleykha	Fazeel	Nominated—Gaumee Film Award for Best Supporting Actor	
2006	Hithuge Edhun	Shahil	Nominated—Gaumee Film Award for Best Actor	
2008	Yoosuf	Aslam		
2009	E Dharifulhu	Farish	Nominated—Maldives Film Award for Best Actor	
2010	Mi Hiyy Keekkuraanee?	Sunil		
2010	Dhin Veynuge Hithaamaigaa	Nahees		
2010	Zalzalaa En'buri Aun	Dr. Sharim	Nominated—Gaumee Film Award for Best Supporting Actor	
2010	Niuma	Nizam		
2011	Zaharu	Zareer	Special appearance	
2011	E Bappa	Yooshau		
2011	Insaaf	Mac		
2012	Mihashin Furaana Dhandhen	Amir		
2012	Love Story	Zahid		
2013	Dhilakani	Shahid	Nominated—Maldives Film Award for Best Supporting Actor	
2014	Raanee	Ismail		
2015	Emme Fahu Vindha Jehendhen	Afeef		
2015	Mikoe Bappa Baey Baey	Ahmed Fazeel / Mohamed Saleem		
2015	Ahsham	Najeeb		
2017	Mee Loaybakee	Adhil		
2017	Naughty 40	Ajwad		
2018	Reyvumun	Yanish	Also the co-producer	
2019	40+	Ajwad		
2022	Hehes	Himself	Special appearance	
2023	Loabi Vevijje	Himself	Special appearance	
2023	Kalhaki	Zalif		
2024	Fureytha	Junaid		
2024	Saaya			
2024	Kamanaa	Nabeel		
2024	Gellunu Rey	Nadheem		
2025	Sorry			
2026	Dhevi	Saleem		
2026	Majunoon	Gamaru	Special appearance	

=== Television ===
Year	Title	Role	Notes	Ref(s)
1989	Hudhu Angi		Teledrama	
1995	Maaburuge Usoolu	Shiyam	Teledrama	
1996	Veyn		Teledrama	
1997	Lhafuraa		Teledrama	
1999	Sifa		Teledrama	
2002	Fahu Fiyavalhu	Is'haq Ramiz	Main role; 5 episodes	
2003–2004	Thiyey Mihithuge Vindhakee	Ahmed Ayaz / Mohamed Adheel	Main role; 52 episodes	
2003	Edhuvas En'buri Annaanenama	Husham	Main role; 5 episode	
2004	Kamana Vareh Neiy	Fayaz	Recurring role; 2 episodes	
2005	Loabi Vaanama	Sameer	Main role; 13 episodes	
2005–2006	Kuramey Vadhaaee Salaam	Ahmed Fayaz	Main role; 13 episodes	
2005	Vairoalhi Ahves Sirrun	Ibrahim	Guest role: "Episode 46"	
2006	Nethi Dhiyayas	Asim	Recurring role; 3 episodes	
2006–2008	Hinithun Velaashey Kalaa	Aslam	Main role; 32 episodes	
2007	Kalaa Dheke Varah Loabivey	Fazeel	Main role; 12 episodes	
2007	Reyfanaa	Nazmee	Main role; 14 episodes	
2008	Hammaa Muhammaa			
2008	Yaasmin		Main role; 5 episodes	
2008	Hama Ekani Kalaayahtakai	Hassan Naail	Main role; 5 episodes Also the director	
2008	Inthihaa		Main role; 13 episodes	
2009	Mohamma Gaadiyaa	Himself	Guest role; "Episode 5"	
2010	Thiya Loabeegai Abadhahme Vaanamey	Nadheem	Also the director	
2011	Naamaan		Main role; 4 episodes	
2011	Hiyy Vanee Inthizaarugai	Shafiu	Also the director	
2012	Case 34	Ahmed Zamir	Teledrama	
2013	Vaudhey Mee	Fizam	Main role; 13 episodes	
2019	Yes Sir	Qadhir	Main role; 10 episodes	
2019–2020	Ehenas	Ibrahim Zahir	Main role	
2021–2022	Giritee Loabi	Sattharu	Main role; 22 episodes	
2022	Biruveri Vaahaka	Yoosuf	Main role; 3 episodes	
2023	Fandu	Nasir	Recurring role; 2 episodes	
2023	Yaaraa	Annie's boyfriend	Guest role; "Episode 15"	
2025	Hinthaa	Boss	Recurring role; 5 episodes	
2026	Ekaniveri Hithakun...	Shaam	Recurring role	

=== Short film ===
Year	Title	Role	Notes
2006	Kudafoolhuge Vasvaas	Himself	Special appearance Also the director
2007	Kudafoolhaai Paree Dhahtha	Paree Beybe	Special appearance
2008	Ummeedh	Farhad	
2008	E Sirru	Wafir	
2010	Nu Ufan Dhari	Anim	
2010	Loabeege Ninja	Lolhey	
2010	Muhammaage Briefcase	Mohamed Rasheed	
2024	Eid Mubarak	Himself	

=== Other work ===
Year	Title	Director	Producer	Screenplay	Notes
2006	Kudafoolhuge Vasvaas	Yes			Short film
2007	Kalaa Dheke Varah Loabivey	Yes		Yes	Television series; 12 episodes
2008	Hama Ekani Kalaayahtakai	Yes			Drama series; 5 episodes
2010	Thiya Loabeegai Abadhahme Vaanamey	Yes			Drama series; 5 episodes
2011	Hiyy Vanee Inthizaarugai	Yes			Drama series
2015	Zakhamvi Hiyy	Yes		Yes	Office drama
2016	Fansahahtti	Yes			Office drama
2018	Badhalu	Yes			Office drama
2018	Reyvumun		Yes		Feature film
2019–2020	Haasaa	Yes			Web series; 13 episodes

== Accolades ==
Year	Award	Category	Nominated work	Result	Ref(s)
1996	Teledrama Awards - 1996	Best Actor	Veyn	Won	
1997	Teledrama Awards - 1997	Best Actor	Lhafuraa	Won	
2007	1st Miadhu Crystal Awards	Best Supporting Actor	Zuleykha	Won	
2007	1st Miadhu Crystal Awards	Best Makeup	Zuleykha (Shared with Shareefa Fakhri)	Won	
2007	4th Gaumee Film Awards	Best Actor	Eynaa	Nominated	
2007	4th Gaumee Film Awards	Best Supporting Actor	Zuleykha	Nominated	
2008	5th Gaumee Film Awards	Best Actor	Hithuge Edhun	Nominated	
2011	1st Maldives Film Awards	Best Actor	E Dharifulhu	Nominated	
2011	1st Maldives Film Awards	Best Make-up	E Dharifulhu	Won	
2011	1st Maldives Film Awards	Best Choreographer	"Vindhu Hithaa" - E Dharifulhu	Nominated	
2011	1st Maldives Film Awards	Best Choreographer	"Hiyy Mi Edhey" - E Dharifulhu	Nominated	
2011	2nd SunFM Awards	Most Entertaining Actor		Nominated	
2012	2nd Maldives Film Awards	Best Make-up	Niuma	Won	
2014	3rd Maldives Film Awards	Best Supporting Actor	Dhilakani	Nominated	
2014	3rd Maldives Film Awards	Best Makeup	Mihashin Furaana Dhandhen	Nominated	
2014	3rd Maldives Film Awards	Best Makeup	Dhilakani	Nominated	
2015	6th Gaumee Film Awards	Best Supporting Actor	Zalzalaa En'buri Aun	Nominated	
2015	6th Gaumee Film Awards	Best Makeup	Niuma	Won	
2015	6th Gaumee Film Awards	Best Makeup	Yoosuf	Nominated	
2015	6th Gaumee Film Awards	Best Makeup	Zalzalaa En'buri Aun	Nominated	
2015	6th Gaumee Film Awards	Best Makeup	Dhin Veynuge Hithaamaigaa	Nominated	
2025	1st MSPA Film Awards	Best Supporting Actor – Male	Kalhaki	Nominated	
