= Maldives Film Award for Best Film =

- Awarded for: Best Film
- Country: Maldives
- Presented by: Maldives Film Association

The Maldives Film Award for Best Director is given as part of the Maldives Film Awards to a film via a jury. The award was first given in 2011. Here is a list of the award winners and the nominees of the respective award ceremonies, classified by the awarded categories.

== Winners and nominees ==
Table key
Indicates the winner

=== Feature film ===
Year	Film	Production studio	Ref(s)
2011 (1st)	Happy Birthday	Dark Rain Entertainment	
2011 (1st)	Baaraige Fas	Eleven Eleven Productions	
2011 (1st)	E Dharifulhu	Eupe Productions	
2011 (1st)	Yoosuf	Crystal Entertainment	
2011 (1st)	Loaiybahtakaa	Eupe Productions	
2012 (2nd)	Loodhifa	Noor N Movies	
2012 (2nd)	Niuma	Dhekedheke Ves Productions	
2012 (2nd)	Jinni	Dash Studio	
2012 (2nd)	Insaaf	Eupe Productions	
2012 (2nd)	Maafeh Neiy	CXanal Movies	
2014 (3rd)	Ingili	R2 Studio	
2014 (3rd)	Dhilakani	Antharees Production	
2014 (3rd)	Mihashin Furaana Dhandhen	Crystal Entertainment	

=== Short film ===
Year	Film	Production studio	Ref(s)
2011 (1st)	Faqeeru Koe	Dhekedheke Ves Productions	
2011 (1st)	No Other Nominee		
2012 (2nd)	Farihibe 3	Dhekedheke Ves Productions	
2012 (2nd)	Siyaasee Vaccine	Dhekedheke Ves Productions	
2012 (2nd)	Muhammaage Briefcase	Dhekedheke Ves Productions	
2014 (3rd)	Farihibe 4	Dhekedheke Ves Productions	
2014 (3rd)	Siyaasee Koalhun	Dhekedheke Ves Productions	
2014 (3rd)	13 Ah Visnaa Dhehaas	Dhekedheke Ves Productions	

== See also ==
- Maldives Film Awards
