= E Dharifulhu =

- Official film poster
- Directed by: Ahmed Nimal
- Written by: Ahmed Sharmeel
- Screenplay by: Yoosuf Shafeeu
- Produced by: Yoosuf Shafeeu
- Starring: Yoosuf Shafeeu; Niuma Mohamed; Mohamed Manik; Sheela Najeeb; Ahmed Nimal
- Cinematography: Ibrahim Moosa
- Edited by: Yoosuf Shafeeu
- Music by: Ayyuman Shareef
- Production companies: Eupe Productions; Future TV; Mai Dream Entertainments
- Release date: 2009
- Country: Maldives
- Language: Dhivehi

E Dharifulhu is a 2009 Maldivian drama film directed by Ahmed Nimal. Produced by Yoosuf Shafeeu under Eupe Productions in collaboration with Future TV and Mai Dream Entertainments, the film stars Yoosuf Shafeeu, Niuma Mohamed, Mohamed Manik, Sheela Najeeb and Ahmed Nimal in pivotal roles.

== Plot ==
Maisha (Niuma Mohamed), head of local women's committee, was returning to home after the dance practice for a show to be hosted to celebrate their organization's first anniversary. On her way, she was followed by an unknown man wearing a black mask and holding a knife. She was mentally disturbed with the incidence while her caring elder sister, Maasha (Sheela Najeeb) and boyfriend Farish (Mohamed Manik), believed it to be her uncertainty. Farish discussed his plan to marry Maisha but she insisted on delaying it. Her brother-in-law Yanish (Yoosuf Shafeeu) returns from Sri Lanka and is shocked to hear about the masked man.

One night, Yanish follows Maisha into the woods and discovers her secret affair with Ahusan (Ahmed Nimal), a friend of Farish, and their wicked plan. On a rainy night, when Maisha was alone in the house, she encounters the same man and was brutally raped. Yanish and Farish recommended to share the occurrence with concerned authority though Maasha decides to conceal it fearing a scandal might tarnish family's reputation. A month later Maisha discovers that she is pregnant and Maasha suggested to abort the child considering their family's esteem. However, Maisha determined to keep the baby creating disputes and quarrels among the siblings.

Maisha gives birth to a baby boy. She decides to end her relationship with Farish despite his love and affection towards her. Maasha opined that the baby looks familiar to Farish implying him as the rapist. Suspicious of Ahsan, Farish follows him to a warehouse where he locates the costume and knife used to frighten Maisha. Maisha tore Ahsan's shirt and notifies that the rapist has a birth mark on his chest but Ahsan doesn't. Ahsan swiftly reveals the mark on Farish's chest much to Maisha's surprise. She informs the discovery to Yanish and Maasha. Once Maisha mentions the mark, Maasha tore off Yanish's shirt revealing a similar mark on his chest too. Maisha differs to believe it since Maasha stated that Yanish is infertile. However, he owns up the child and reveals Maasha's wicked plan.

Maasha underwent a sterilization procedure to prevent pregnancy. She assigns Ahsan to scare Maisha and murders her by drowning in the sea. Maasha plans to transfer all the properties into her name after Maisha's death and marries Ahsan afterwards. Yanish hid Ahsan's coat and used it the night he raped Maasha in order to confirm his fertility. Yanish schemed to blame the incidence on Ahsan, and puts the coat to Ahsan's warehouse where Farish finds it. He divorced Maisha and leaves. Maisha apologizes to Farish and they reunite.

== Cast ==
- Yoosuf Shafeeu as Yanish
- Niuma Mohamed as Maisha
- Mohamed Manik as Farish
- Sheela Najeeb as Maasha
- Ahmed Nimal as Ahsan
- Nashidha Mohamed as Ziyadha
- Ali Fizam as choreographer (special appearance)
- Nadhiya Hassan as Faathun (special appearance)

== Soundtrack ==
Track listing
No.	Title	Lyrics	Music	Singer(s)	Length
1.	"Baakeevefaa"	Mohamed Abdul Ghanee	Ayyuman Shareef	Mohamed Abdul Ghanee, Shifa Thaufeeq
2.	"Ey Yaaraa"	Mohamed Abdul Ghanee	Ibrahim Nifar	Mariyam Ashfa
3.	"Hiyy Mi Edhey"	Mohamed Abdul Ghanee	Ibrahim Nifar	Mariyam Ashfa, Ibrahim Zaid Ali
4.	"Hiyy Kalaa"	Mohamed Abdul Ghanee	Ibrahim Ali	Mohamed Abdul Ghanee, Aminath Shaufa Saeed

== Accolades ==
Year	Award	Category	Recipients	Result	Ref.
2011	1st Maldives Film Awards	Best Film	E Dharifulhu	Nominated	
2011	1st Maldives Film Awards	Best Director	Ahmed Nimal	Nominated	
2011	1st Maldives Film Awards	Best Actor	Mohamed Manik	Nominated	
2011	1st Maldives Film Awards	Best Actor	Yoosuf Shafeeu	Nominated	
2011	1st Maldives Film Awards	Best Actress	Sheela Najeeb	Nominated	
2011	1st Maldives Film Awards	Best Actress	Niuma Mohamed	Nominated	
2011	1st Maldives Film Awards	Best Make-up	Mohamed Manik	Won	
2011	1st Maldives Film Awards	Best Choreographer	Ali Fizam - "Ey Yaara"	Nominated	
2011	1st Maldives Film Awards	Best Choreographer	Mohamed Manik - "Vindhu Hithaa"	Nominated	
2011	1st Maldives Film Awards	Best Choreographer	Mohamed Manik - "Hiyy Mi Edhey"	Nominated	
