= Yoosuf =

2008 Maldivian romantic drama film

- Official film poster
- Directed by: Fathimath Nahula
- Written by: Fathimath Nahula
- Screenplay by: Fathimath Nahula
- Starring: Yoosuf Shafeeu; Niuma Mohamed; Sheela Najeeb; Mohamed Manik; Ahmed Nimal; Ahmed Lais Asim
- Cinematography: Ibrahim Moosa
- Edited by: Fathimath Nahula
- Music by: Ibrahim Nifar
- Production company: Crystal Entertainment
- Release date: July 1, 2008
- Running time: 178 minutes
- Country: Maldives
- Language: Dhivehi

Yoosuf is a 2008 Maldivian romantic drama film written and directed by Fathimath Nahula. Produced under Crystal Entertainment, the film stars Yoosuf Shafeeu, Niuma Mohamed, Sheela Najeeb, Mohamed Manik, Ahmed Nimal and Ahmed Lais Asim in pivotal roles.

The film received widespread critical acclaim and was one of the Maldivian all-time highest-grossing films. The film was Maldivian official entry at 2009 SAARC Film Festivals and holds the privilege of being the opening movie of the festival.

== Plot ==
Yasir (Ahmed Nimal) reluctantly accepts a mute and deaf man, Yoosuf Ali (Yoosuf Shafeeu) as a servant at his house. His daughters, Usha Yasir (Niuma Mohamed) and Leesa (Zeenath Abbas) have a hard time welcoming a man as an attendant. Realizing their detestation towards him, their grandmother (Fauziyya Hassan) tried to kick him out of the house but Usha ultimately stopped her, sympathizing about his unfortunate situation. As time flies, Usha and Yoosuf share a romantic attraction towards each other. Yoosuf is then introduced to Aslam (Mohamed Manik), Usha's fiancé, which breaks his heart and determined to move back to his island. Before that, their affair was exposed to Yasir where he drags him out of the house.

Anguished, Usha reveals her true affection towards Aslam but decides to marry him fearing it might tarnish her father's reputation otherwise. With the help of her friend, Aree (Mariyam Siyadha), Usha meets Yoosuf minutes before his departure and goes to his island along with him which results in her father disowning her and warning the family never to reach out to Usha. Mary, the childhood best friend of Yoosuf who is secretly in love with him was very excited to hear the news of his return although she was devastated to see Usha with him. Yoosuf and Usha get married despite her father's disapproval and months later they have a baby boy, Yoonus (Ahmed Lais Asim). On hearing the joyous news, Yasir comes to take Usha, Yoosuf and Yoonus back to Male'. Considering the fact that, Yoonus will be hailed better in a place like Male', Yoosuf agreed to relocate. Things start to fall apart when Yoosuf is continuously humiliated by his father-in-law and he moves back to his island with his son.

== Cast ==
- Yoosuf Shafeeu as Yoosuf Ali
- Niuma Mohamed as Usha Yasir
- Sheela Najeeb as Mary
- Mohamed Manik as Aslam
- Ahmed Nimal as Yasir
- Fauziyya Hassan as Yasir's mother
- Ravee Farooq as Riyaz
- Zeenath Abbas as Leesa
- Ahmed Lais Asim as Yoonus Bin Yoosuf Ali
- Aminath Shareef as Aisth
- Ali Ahmed as Mary's friend
- Aishath Siyadha as Aree
- Aishath Rasheedha as Mary's mother
- Hamid Ali as Yasir's friend
- Roanu Hassan Manik as Yasir's friend
- Ali Shameel as Judge
- Chilhiya Moosa Manik as Adambe
- Aminath Ameela as a school teacher
- Ahmed Saeed as Aslam's friend (special appearance)
- Nadhiya Hassan as gym partner (special appearance)
- Aishath Rishmy Special appearance in item number "Masthee Masthee"

== Soundtrack ==
Track listing
| No. | Title | Lyrics | Music | Singer(s) | Length |
|---|---|---|---|---|---|
| 1. | "Ushaa" | Adam Haleem Adnan | Mohamed Ahmed | Hassan Ilham, Shifa Thaufeeq |
| 2. | "Hairaan Vaahaa Chaaley Thiloa" | Adam Haleem Adnan | Mohamed Ahmed | Mohamed Abdul Ghanee |
| 3. | "Mee Magey Haalathey" | Adam Haleem Adnan | Hussain Sobah | Mariyam Enash Shinan |
| 4. | "Theeye Hithuga Mivaa" | Adam Haleem Adnan | Hussain Sobah | Mumthaz Moosa, Moonisa Khaleel |
| 5. | "Ivvenee Haaley" | Mausoom Shakir | Hussain Sobah | Abdul Baaree |
| 6. | "Loabi Lee Oyaa" | Adam Haleem Adnan | Hussain Sobah | Mumthaz Moosa, Moonisa Khaleel |
| 7. | "Beeve Dhaanebaa" | Mausoom Shakir | Ahmed Imthiyaz | Ibrahim Zaid Ali, Ahmed Lais Asim, Sofoora Khaleel |
| 8. | "Masthee Masthee" | Adam Haleem Adnan | Ahmed Imthiyaz | Mariyam Unoosha |
| 9. | "Shakuvaa" | Mausoom Shakir | Hussain Sobah | Mohamed Abdul Ghanee |
| 10. | "Loabivan Malikaa Ey" | Adam Haleem Adnan | Hussain Sobah | Abdul Baaree |

== Accolades ==
| Year | Award | Category | Recipients | Result | Ref. |
|---|---|---|---|---|---|
| 2011 | 1st Maldives Film Awards | Best Film | Yoosuf | Nominated | |
| 2011 | 1st Maldives Film Awards | Best Film of the Year (Viewer's Choice) | Yoosuf | Won | |
| 2011 | 1st Maldives Film Awards | Best Director | Fathimath Nahula | Nominated | |
| 2011 | 1st Maldives Film Awards | Best Actor | Yoosuf Shafeeu | Nominated | |
| 2011 | 1st Maldives Film Awards | Best Actress | Niuma Mohamed | Won | |
| 2011 | 1st Maldives Film Awards | Best Supporting Actress | Sheela Najeeb | Won | |
| 2011 | 1st Maldives Film Awards | Best Male Playback Singer | Mohamed Abdul Ghanee for "Hairaan Vaahaa" | Won | |
| 2011 | 1st Maldives Film Awards | Best Lyrics | Mausoom Shakir for "Shakuvaa" | Won | |
| 2011 | 1st Maldives Film Awards | Best Debut (Male) | Ahmed Lais Asim | Won | |
| 2011 | 1st Maldives Film Awards | Best Child Artist | Ahmed Lais Asim | Won | |
| 2011 | 6th Gaumee Film Awards | Best Film | Yoosuf | Nominated | |
| 2011 | 6th Gaumee Film Awards | Best Director | Fathimath Nahula | Nominated | |
| 2011 | 6th Gaumee Film Awards | Best Actor | Yoosuf Shafeeu | Nominated | |
| 2011 | 6th Gaumee Film Awards | Best Actress | Niuma Mohamed | Nominated | |
| 2011 | 6th Gaumee Film Awards | Best Supporting Actor | Ahmed Nimal | Nominated | |
| 2011 | 6th Gaumee Film Awards | Best Supporting Actor | Ahmed Lais Asim | Nominated | |
| 2011 | 6th Gaumee Film Awards | Best Editing | Fathimath Nahula | Nominated | |
| 2011 | 6th Gaumee Film Awards | Best Cinematography | Ibrahim Moosa Manik | Won | |
| 2011 | 6th Gaumee Film Awards | Best Background Music | Ibrahim Nifar | Nominated | |
| 2011 | 6th Gaumee Film Awards | Best Sound Mixing | Hussain Shuhadh | Won | |
| 2011 | 6th Gaumee Film Awards | Best Art Direction | Fathimath Nahula | Won | |
| 2011 | 6th Gaumee Film Awards | Best Choreography | Fathimath Nahula, Ali Yooshau, Rustham Hassan for "Kiyaa Raagu Veynee" | Won | |
| 2011 | 6th Gaumee Film Awards | Best Costume Design | Razeena Thaufeeq, Jadhulla Ismail | Nominated | |
| 2011 | 6th Gaumee Film Awards | Best Makeup | Mohamed Manik | Nominated | |
