= Jinni (film) =

- Official film poster
- Directed by: Abdul Faththaah
- Written by: Ibrahim Waheed
- Screenplay by: Ibrahim Waheed; Mahdi Ahmed
- Produced by: Ahmed Sharan Hassan
- Starring: Ali Seezan; Mariyam Afeefa; Amira Ismail
- Cinematography: Ibrahim Wisan
- Edited by: Abdul Faththaah
- Music by: Ayyuman Shareef
- Production company: Dash Studio
- Release date: January 28, 2010
- Country: Maldives
- Language: Dhivehi

Jinni is a 2010 Maldivian horror film directed by Abdul Faththaah. Produced by Ahmed Sharan Hassan under Dash Studio, the film stars Ali Seezan, Mariyam Afeefa and Amira Ismail in pivotal roles. The film was released on 28 January 2010. The film is based on a true stories that occurred in an island of Maldives. The entire film is shot at B. Kamadhoo. The film took eight months to be completed and ready for release.

== Plot ==
The film starts with the scene Javid (Ali Seezan) and his father quarreling about his wedding proposal to a girl named Nasiha (Amira Ismail), who is the daughter of Javid's father's friend. His mother (Aminath Rasheedha) convinced him to marry Nasiha, though she is aware of the fact that Seezan has been chased by a spirit and it won't allow him to marry anyone. Afterwards, his mother handed over a piece of paper to him. The film is presented in a nonlinear narrative, jumping between the present and past. In the flashbacks it reveal the past incidents which have occurred in Javid's life.

In order to pursue secondary education, Javid travelled to a nearby island where he meets Thahumeena (Mariyam Afeefa) and a romantic relationship arises between them. Thahumeena spent most of her time at Javid’s house and did all the household chores. The storyline revolved around Javid, Thahumeena and a ghost shaping as Thahumeena. While the ghost urged Javid every night, to go to the beach, Thahumeena expressed her fear for the same. However, Javid and the ghost goes to the beach every night. Suspicious of difference personality of Thahumeena between the days and nights, it was later revealed to Javid, he has been dating a ghost which Thahumeena is not aware of.

== Cast ==
- Ali Seezan as Javid
- Mariyam Afeefa as Thahumeena
- Amira Ismail as Nasiha
- Aminath Rasheedha as Faheema
- Ali Ahmed as Fairooz
- Mohamed Rasheed as Azeem
- Fauziyya Hassan as Rasheedha
- Hamid Ali (Special appearance)
- Ahmed Asim as Ahmed (Special appearance)
- Mohamed Afrah as Javid's friend (Special appearance)
- Hussain Shibau as Jaufar(Special appearance)

== Release and response ==
Upon release, the film received a positive response at the box office. Twenty shows of the film were screened at Olympus Cinema, out of which eighteen shows were reported to be housefull. Further five shows were screened at Athena Cinema, while four of them were considered to be fully occupied. The film however received mixed reviews from critics. A reviewer of Haveeru Daily wrote: "Jinni, despite the hype that revolved around the country, was no exception to other mediocre Maldivian film. The suspense and uniqueness, Fahthah promised was never seen, anywhere in the movie".

== Soundtrack ==
The soundtrack album of the film was composed by Ayyuman Shareef and Mohamed Sobah while the lyrics were penned by Mohamed Abdul Ghanee, Ismail Mubarik and Ahmed Haleem.

No.	Title	Lyrics	Singer(s)	Length
1.	"Loabivaa"	Mohamed Abdul Ghanee	Mohamed Abdul Ghanee, Aishath Maain Rasheed
2.	"Binmatheegaa"	Ismail Mubarik	Mukhthar Adam
3.	"Fenifaa Kalaa"	Ahmed Haleem	Mohamed Abdul Ghanee, Mariyam Ashfa
4.	"Thundimathi"		Hassan Ilham
5.	"Roveyhaavey"	Mohamed Abdul Ghanee	Mohamed Abdul Ghanee, Shifa Thaufeeq
6.	"Aadhey"		Ahmed Ibrahim, Mariyam Ashfa

== Accolades ==
Award	Category	Recipients	Result	Ref.
2nd Maldives Film Awards	Best Film	Jinni	Nominated	
2nd Maldives Film Awards	Best Director	Abdul Faththaah	Nominated	
2nd Maldives Film Awards	Best Actor	Ali Seezan	Nominated	
2nd Maldives Film Awards	Best Actress	Mariyam Afeefa	Nominated	
2nd Maldives Film Awards	Best Editing	Abdul Faththaah	Nominated	
2nd Maldives Film Awards	Best Cinematography	Ibrahim Wisan	Won	
2nd Maldives Film Awards	Best Choreography	Abdul Faththaah	Won	
