= Loaiybahtakaa =

- Official film poster
- Directed by: Yoosuf Shafeeu
- Screenplay by: Yoosuf Shafeeu
- Produced by: Mohamed Afrah
- Starring: Yoosuf Shafeeu; Sheela Najeeb; Fathimath Fareela; Mohamed Faisal
- Cinematography: Ibrahim Moosa
- Edited by: Ahmed Shah Ali
- Music by: Ayyuman Shareef
- Production company: Eupe Productions
- Release date: November 8, 2009
- Running time: 165 minutes
- Country: Maldives
- Language: Dhivehi

Loaiybahtakaa (English Translation: For love) is a 2009 Maldivian romantic film written and directed by Yoosuf Shafeeu. Produced by Mohamed Afrah under Eupe Productions, the film stars Shafeeu, Sheela Najeeb, Fathimath Fareela and Mohamed Faisal in pivotal roles.

== Plot ==
Majid (Ahmed Nimal) receives the news of Arifa's (Aminath Shareef) sudden illness, who has been diagnosed with a cardiovascular disease. He promptly visits her, and she makes him promise to look after their son, Najah, whose parenthood is being hidden from the world and has been forcibly relocated to another island two months ago. Majid's wife, Sharmeela (Fauziyya Hassan), reluctantly agrees to welcome his son to their home, although she announced her detestation. Najah, unable to survive criticism and verbal abuse from his stepmother, agrees to go back to his island and stays at Guraidhoo Centre.

Years later, Najah (Yoosuf Shafeeu) has been released from the Centre, and Majid takes him back to his house. Majid and Sharmeela's son, Zaid (Mohamed Faisal) befriends Najah. Zaid is secretly in love with his friend Reysham (Sheela Najeeb) and struggles to express his feelings for her. Zaid is also friends with Reysham's younger sister, Shabee (Fathimath Fareela), who continuously gets harassed by a local gangster, Bassan (Mohamed Shah Ali). He has been previously arrested by police, reported by Shabee, for involvement in drug dealing. One day, Najah stops Bassan from tormenting Shabee on her way back home, and she starts to consider him a "hero". He is then properly introduced to the group, and they start hanging out together. Najah soon finds a childhood photograph of Reysham and realizes that he has been in love with Reysham since childhood.

One night, while Najah was going home, he was brutally attacked Bassan and his gang. Sharmeela demands that Majid kick him out of the house, fearing he will tarnish their reputation, as she was under the belief that Najah instigated the fight. Najah clears all the misunderstandings, but Sharmeela refuses to listen. In an attempt to smooth things out, Majid reveals Najah's true identity in front of everyone and open-heartedly welcomes him into his family. Zaid, now realizing that Najah is his brother, becomes closer to him and confides in him about his feelings for Reysham. Najah decides to distance himself from Reysham to make his brother happy. However, Reysham starts liking Najah due to his helpful and caring attitude. Realizing this, Najah fakes a phone call and acts like he is happily married, hoping Reysham will forget him beyond as a friend. Heartbroken, Reysham storms off home, only for Shabee to reveal that she is also attracted to Najah. Reysham instantly discloses his truth to Shabee, saying that he is a married man. Worsening the situation, Zaid enters their house and proposes to Reysham to marry him, which she politely declines.

After several conversations, Reysham agrees to marry Zaid. But soon after, she learns the truth about Najah's marital status and discovers that he has been lying to her. She confronts Najah and questions him about why he felt the need to lie to her, to which Najah reveals his true feelings for her. The two have a heartfelt moment but decide to let it be. One day, when they were swimming at the beach, Bassan attacked Najah once again, this time stabbing him with a knife and murdering him. Post his funeral, Zaid finds a photograph of little Reysham with a love quote in Najah's book, and realizes Najah's sacrifices for Zaid and for the peace of the family. Before the end credits roll in, a visitor also named Najah (Lufshan Shakeeb) is introduced, and he helps Shabee out, leaving a positive impact on her.

== Cast ==
- Yoosuf Shafeeu as Najah
- Sheela Najeeb as Reysham
- Fathimath Fareela as Shabee
- Mohamed Faisal as Zaid
- Ahmed Shah Ali as Bassan
- Ahmed Nimal as Majid
- Fauziyya Hassan as Sharmeela
- Aminath Shareef as Arifa
- Mohamed Afrah
- Zuhuree as Sham
- Mohamed Rifshan as Iqbal
- Lufshan Shakeeb as a Najah (special appearance)

== Soundtrack ==
Track listing
No.	Title	Lyrics	Singer(s)	Length
1.	"Hiyy Nagaafaa Ma Dhineema"	Adam Haleem Adnan	Abdul Baaree, Rafiyath Rameeza
2.	"Ufalugaa"	Adam Haleem Adnan	Mumthaz Moosa, Hassan Ilham
3.	"Loiybahtakaa"	Adam Haleem Adnan	Ibrahim Zaid Ali, Aishath Maain Rasheed
4.	"Abadhuves Feneyey Kalaa"	Adam Haleem Adnan	Hassan Ilham, Shifa Thaufeeq

== Accolades ==
Year	Award	Category	Recipients	Result	Ref.
2011	1st Maldives Film Awards	Best Film	Loiybahtakaa	Nominated	
2011	1st Maldives Film Awards	Best Director	Yoosuf Shafeeu	Nominated	
2011	1st Maldives Film Awards	Best Actor	Mohamed Faisal	Nominated	
2011	1st Maldives Film Awards	Best Child Artist	Shaifan Shaheem	Nominated	
