= 2nd Maldives Film Awards =

- Date: 4 July 2012

Highlights
- Best Film: Loodhifa
- Most awards: Loodhifa (6)

2nd Maldives Film Awards ceremony, presented by the Maldives Film Association, honored the best Maldivian films released in 2010 and 2011. Nominations for the major categories were announced on 25 June 2012. The ceremony was held on 4 July 2012.

== Feature film ==
Best Film	Best Director
Loodhifa; Niuma; Jinni; Insaaf; Maafeh Neiy	Niuma Mohamed – Niuma; Moomin Fuad – Loodhifa; Abdul Faththaah – Jinni; Yoosuf Shafeeu – Insaaf; Ali Seezan – Maafeh Neiy
Best Actor	Best Actress
Ismail Rasheed – Loodhifa; Ahmed Nimal – Niuma; Ahmed Saeed – Insaaf; Yoosuf Shafeeu – Veeraana; Ali Seezan – Jinni	Niuma Mohamed – Niuma; Mariyam Afeefa – Loodhifa; Fathimath Azifa – Loodhifa; Mariyam Afeefa – Jinni; Niuma Mohamed – Maafeh Neiy
Best Supporting Actor	Best Supporting Actress
Ali Seezan – Dhin Veynuge Hithaamaigaa; Ahmed Asim – Loodhifa; Ahmed Ziya – Insaaf; Ali Firaq – Veeraana; Yoosuf Shafeeu – Insaaf	Sheela Najeeb – Niuma; Aminath Rasheedha – Niuma; Khadheeja Ibrahim Didi – Loodhifa; Sheela Najeeb – Zaharu; Aishath Rishmy – 14 Vileyrey
Best Male Playback Singer	Best Female Playback Singer
Hassan Ilham - "Kalaa Beevumun" - Dhin Veynuge Hithaamaigaa	Shifa Thaufeeq - "Loabeegaa" - 14 Vileyrey
Best Child Artist	Best Screenplay
Aminath Samiyya – Veeraana	Mahdi Ahmed – Sazaa
Best Make-up	Best Choreography
Mohamed Manik – Niuma	Abdul Faththaah - "Thundimatheega" - Jinni
Best Art Direction	Best Lyrics
Moomin Fuad, Ismail Rasheed, Hussain Munawwar – Loodhifa	Abdul Hannan Moosa Didi - "Dhin Veynuge Hithaamaigaa" - Dhin Veynuge Hithaamaigaa
Best Debut (Male)	Best Debut (Female)
Ahmed Azmeel – Fanaa	Fathimath Nashfa – Loodhifa
Best Sound Editing	Best Sound Mixing
Mohamed Ikram – Insaaf	Mohamed Ikram – Insaaf
Best Editing	Best Original Score
Abdulla Muaz – Niuma; Ahmed Asim – Loodhifa; Abdul Faththaah – Jinni; Ali Seezan – Maafeh Neiy; Ahmed Ziya, Yoosuf Shafeeu – Insaaf	Mohamed Ikram – Insaaf
Best Costume Designer	Best Visual Effects
Aminath Naseera – Loodhifa	Ahmed Sinan – Dhin Veynuge Hithaamaigaa
Best Cinematographer	Best Film of the Year (Viewer's Choice)
Ibrahim Wisan – Jinni	Loodhifa

== Short film ==
Best Film	Best Director
Farihibe 3; Siyaasee Vaccine; Muhammaage Briefcase	Abdulla Muaz – Siyaasee Vaccine
Best Actor	Best Actress
Hussain Munawwar – Kudafoolhu	Amira Ismail – Siyaasee Vaccine

== Special awards ==
Lifetime Achievement Award
- Arifa Ibrahim

== Most wins ==
- Loodhifa - 6
- Niuma - 5

== See also ==
- Maldives Film Awards
