= Dhilakani =

- Official film poster
- Directed by: Hussain Munawwar
- Screenplay by: Mahdi Ahmed
- Starring: Ismail Rasheed; Niuma Mohamed; Mohamed Manik; Aminath Rishfa; Mohamed Faisal
- Cinematography: Shivaz Abdulla
- Edited by: Ali Musthafa; Ali Shifau
- Music by: Ibrahim Nifar
- Production company: Antharees Production
- Release date: May 27, 2013
- Country: Maldives
- Language: Dhivehi

Dhilakani is a 2013 Maldivian romantic thriller film directed by Hussain Munawwar. Produced under Antharees Production, the film stars Ismail Rasheed, Niuma Mohamed, Mohamed Manik, Aminath Rishfa and Mohamed Faisal in pivotal roles. The film was released on 27 May 2013.

== Cast ==
- Ismail Rasheed as Shamin
- Niuma Mohamed as Lara
- Mohamed Manik as Shahid
- Aminath Rishfa as Moonisa
- Mohamed Faisal as Shanil
- Roanu Hassan Manik as Ibrahim Saleem
- Mariyam Haleem as Faathuma
- Ahmed Ziya as Raalhey
- Abdulla Naseer as Idress
- Ali Azim as Shamin's friend
- Neena Saleem as a scanner
- Amira Ismail as Muzna

== Development ==
The production of Dhilakai commenced in Male' in late August 2012. After shooting all the scenes required to be shot in Male', production was then shifted to Sh. Feevah, before leaving to Sh. Foakaidhoo. The film marks Mahdi Ahmed and Hussain Munawwar's second collaboration after Sazaa (2011). The film deals with a man's tumultuous journey to seek vengeance, his undoing and his eventual redemption from an unlikeliest of sources. Some of the violent scenes in the film were based on real incidents that happened in different corners of Maldives.

== Soundtrack ==
Track listing
No.	Title	Lyrics	Music	Singer(s)	Length
1.	"Inthihaayah"	Ismail Mubarik	Ibrahim Nifar	Mohamed Abdul Ghanee, Ahmed Shabeen, Mariyam Ashfa
2.	"Dhilakani" (Promotional songs)	Ahmed Falah	Ibrahim Nifar	Ibrahim Nifar, Rafiyath Rameeza, Ahmed Yafiu

== Release and reception ==
The film was released on 27 May 2013. The film attracted negative reception from critics. Ahmed Nadheem of Haveeru wrote: "The film is similar to a ship without a direction, an aimless screenplay leading the director to no path. Embraced with futile characters, impractical scenes and out-dated music, the film has problems in each department". Summarising his review, Nadheem labels the film to be of "low quality" and a "displeasure".

== Accolades ==
Award	Category	Recipients	Result	Ref.
3rd Maldives Film Awards	Best Film	Dhilakani	Nominated	
3rd Maldives Film Awards	Best Director	Hussain Munawwar	Nominated	
3rd Maldives Film Awards	Best Actor	Ismail Rasheed	Nominated	
3rd Maldives Film Awards	Best Actress	Niuma Mohamed	Won	
3rd Maldives Film Awards	Best Supporting Actor	Mohamed Manik	Nominated	
3rd Maldives Film Awards	Best Supporting Actress	Aminath Rishfa	Won	
3rd Maldives Film Awards	Best Male Debut	Ahmed Reehan	Nominated	
3rd Maldives Film Awards	Best Female Debut	Aminath Rishfa	Won	
3rd Maldives Film Awards	Best Original Screenplay	Mahdi Ahmed	Nominated	
3rd Maldives Film Awards	Best Cinematography	Shivaz Abdulla	Nominated	
3rd Maldives Film Awards	Best Editing	Ali Musthafa	Won	
3rd Maldives Film Awards	Best Male Playback Singer	Ahmed Yafiu for "Dhilakani"	Nominated	
3rd Maldives Film Awards	Best Female Playback Singer	Rafiyath Rameeza for "Dhilakani"	Nominated	
3rd Maldives Film Awards	Best Original Score	Ibrahim Nifar	Nominated	
3rd Maldives Film Awards	Best Sound Editing	Ali Musthafa and Ibrahim Nifar	Nominated	
3rd Maldives Film Awards	Best Mixing	Ali Musthafa	Nominated	
3rd Maldives Film Awards	Best Art Direction	Hassan Shiyam, Hussain Munawwar	Nominated	
3rd Maldives Film Awards	Best Makeup Artist	Mohamed Manik	Nominated	
3rd Maldives Film Awards	Best Costume Design	Dhilakani	Won	
3rd Maldives Film Awards	Best Visual Effects	Ahmed Sinan	Nominated	
7th Gaumee Film Awards	Best Background Music	Ibrahim Nifar	Nominated	
7th Gaumee Film Awards	Best Sound Editing	Ali Musthafa	Nominated	
7th Gaumee Film Awards	Best Sound Mixing	Ali Musthafa	Nominated	
