= 3rd Maldives Film Awards =

- Date: 29 April 2014

Highlights
- Best Film: Ingili
- Most awards: Ingili (11)
- Most nominations: Dhilakani (20)

3rd Maldives Film Awards ceremony, presented by the Maldives Film Association, honored the best Maldivian films released in 2012 and 2013. Nominations for the major categories were announced on 28 April 2014. The ceremony was held on the same day of nomination announcement.

== Feature film ==
Best Film	Best Director
Ingili; Dhilakani; Mihashin Furaana Dhandhen	Ravee Farooq – Ingili; Hussain Munawwar – Dhilakani; Ravee Farooq – Mihashin Furaana Dhandhen
Best Actor	Best Actress
Ismail Rasheed – Ingili; Ismail Rasheed – Dhilakani; Yoosuf Shafeeu – Fathis Handhuvaruge Feshun 3D	Niuma Mohamed – Dhilakani; Niuma Mohamed – Mihashin Furaana Dhandhen; Fathimath Fareela – Fathis Handhuvaruge Feshun 3D
Best Supporting Actor	Best Supporting Actress
Abdulla Muaz – Ingili; Mohamed Manik – Dhilakani; Ahmed Nimal – Mihashin Furaana Dhandhen	Aminath Rishfa – Dhilakani; Aishath Rishmy – Love Story; Mariyam Shakeela – Mihashin Furaana Dhandhen
Best Male Playback Singer	Best Female Playback Singer
Mohamed Abdul Ghanee - "Vamey Fun Khiyaalu" - Fathis Handhuvaruge Feshun 3D; Mohamed Abdul Ghanee - "Fathis Handhuvaruge Feshun" - Fathis Handhuvaruge Feshun 3D; Ahmed Yafiu - "Dhilakani" - Dhilakani	Mira Mohamed Majid - "Mijehey Vaigaa" - Love Story; Shifa Thaufeeq - "Vamey Fun Khiyaalu" - Fathis Handhuvaruge Feshun 3D; Rafiyath Rameeza - "Dhilakani" - Dhilakani
Best Original Song	Best Original Screenplay
Ayyuman Shareef - "Vamey Fun Khiyaalu" - Fathis Handhuvaruge Feshun 3D; Mohamed Abdul Ghanee - Mihashin Furaana Dhandhen; Mohamed Abdul Ghanee, Moosa Samau - Mihashin Furaana Dhandhen	Mahdi Ahmed – Ingili; Fathimath Nahula – Mihashin Furaana Dhandhen; Mahdi Ahmed – Dhilakani
Best Makeup	Best Choreography
Hassan Adam - Fathis Handhuvaruge Feshun 3D; Mohamed Manik - Mihashin Furaana Dhandhen; Mohamed Manik - Dhilakani	Abdul Faththaah - Love Story; Ravee Farooq - Mihashin Furaana Dhandhen; Fathimath Fareela - Fathis Handhuvaruge Feshun 3D
Best Art Direction	Best Lyrics
Ravee Farooq, Mahdi Ahmed, Hussain Munawwar - Ingili; Mohamed Ali, Ali Shifau - Fathis Handhuvaruge Feshun 3D; Hassan Shiyam, Hussain Munawwar - Dhilakani	Ismail Mubarak - "Fathis Handhuvaru" - Fathis Handhuvaruge Feshun 3D; Shifa Thaufeeq - "Zuvaan Thiya Nan" - Fathis Handhuvaruge Feshun 3D; Mausoom Shakir - "Sihijjey Birun" - Mihashin Furaana Dhandhen
Best Debut (Male)	Best Debut (Female)
Ali Sofeeh Samir – Ingili; Hussain Shahid – Love Story; Ahmed Reehan – Dhilakani	Aminath Rishfa – Dhilakani; Sujeetha Abdulla – Bodyguard; Hawwa Zahira – Fathis Handhuvaruge Feshun 3D
Best Sound Editing	Best Sound Mixing
Mohamed Ikram – Ingili; Ali Musthafa, Ibrahim Nifar – Dhilakani; Ali Shifau – Fathis Handhuvaruge Feshun 3D	Mohamed Ikram – Ingili; Ali Musthafa – Dhilakani; Ali Shifau – Fathis Handhuvaruge Feshun 3D
Best Editing	Best Original Score
Ali Musthafa – Dhilakani; Ali Shifau – Fathis Handhuvaruge Feshun 3D; Ravee Farooq – Ingili	Mohamed Ikram – Ingili; Ibrahim Nifar – Mihashin Furaana Dhandhen; Ibrahim Nifar – Dhilakani
Best Costume Designer	Best Visual Effects
Dhilakani; Ingili; Mihashin Furaana Dhandhen	Ahmed Sinan – Fathis Handhuvaruge Feshun 3D; Ahmed Sinan – Dhilakani; Ahmed Sinan – Ingili
Best Cinematography	Best Film of the Year (Viewer's Choice)
Hussain Munawwar - Ingili; Shivaz Abdulla - Dhilakani; Ibrahim Wisan - Love Story	Bodyguard

== Short film ==
Best Film	Best Director
Farihibe 4; Siyaasee Koalhun; 13 Ah Visnaa Dhehaas	Abdulla Muaz – Farihibe 4; Abdulla Muaz – Siyaasee Koalhun; Abdulla Muaz – 13 Ah Visnaa Dhehaas
Best Actor	Best Actress
Mohamed Abdulla – Farihibe 4; Mohamed Abdulla – Siyaasee Koalhun; Mohamed Abdulla – 13 Ah Visnaa Dhehaas	Fathimath Azifa – Farihibe 4; Zeenath Abbas – Siyaasee Koalhun; Niuma Mohamed – 13 Ah Visnaa Dhehaas
Best Supporting Actor	Best Supporting Actress
Ismail Rasheed – Farihibe 4; Ismail Rasheed – Siyaasee Koalhun; Ismail Rasheed – 13 Ah Visnaa Dhehaas	Aishath Rishmy – Farihibe 4; Fathimath Azifa – Siyaasee Koalhun; Fathimath Azifa – 13 Ah Visnaa Dhehaas
Best Editing	Best Cinematography
Abdulla Muaz – Siyaasee Koalhun; Ali Shifau – Voodoo; Abdulla Muaz – Farihibe 4	Ibrahim Wisan – Farihibe 4; Ibrahim Wisan – Siyaasee Koalhun; Shivaz Abdulla – 13 Ah Visnaa Dhehaas
Best Screenplay	Best Makeup
Ahmed Falah – Farihibe 4; Ahmed Falah – Siyaasee Koalhun; Ahmed Falah – 13 Ah Visnaa Dhehaas	Aishath Rishmy, Fathimath Azifa – Farihibe 4; Zeenath Abbas, Fathimath Azifa – Siyaasee Koalhun; Niuma Mohamed, Fathimath Azifa – 13 Ah Visnaa Dhehaas

== Special awards ==
Lifetime Achievement Award
- Hassan Haleem

== Most wins ==
- Ingili - 11
- Dhilakani - 5
- Fathis Handhuvaruge Feshun 3D - 5

== See also ==
- Maldives Film Awards
