= Abdulla Muaz =

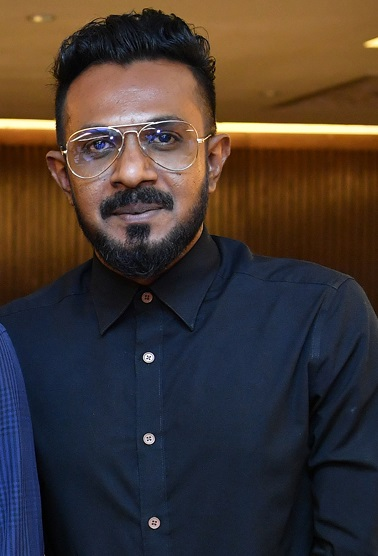
- Muaz at Niuma Mohamed's Silver Jubilee celebration event, 2019
- Occupations: Actor, editor, director
- Years active: 2004–present
- Spouse: Shayan Shahida (divorced) Mariyam Azza (m. 2020)
- Children: 1

Abdulla Muaz is a Maldivian film actor, editor and director.

== Career ==
Muaz made a brief appearance in Yoosuf Shafeeu directed horror film Edhathuru (2004) which revolves around eight friends who go on a picnic to a haunted uninhabited island and their battle for survival. The film garnered critical appreciation specially for its sound effect and was a commercial success.

Moomin Fuad and Ali Shifau's critically appreciated crime film Heylaa (2006) featured Muaz as a drug user. The film narrates the story of a fourteen years old ambitious boy who finds himself unknowingly being involved in smuggling of a revolver. It was the first Maldivian film to be shot in high-definition digital video. Though the film received positive reviews from critics, it was a commercial failure. Co-director of the film Shifau opined that its commercial status was a result of casting "not very prominent" faces in the film and the "film-goers were not ready to accept the genre" at the time of release. Ahmed Nadheem from Haveeru praised the narration and plot of the film while calling his performance to be "strictly average". He next appeared as a man practicing the art of palmistry in Hukuru Vileyrey (2006), co-directed by Aishath Rishmy and Aminath Rasheedha which was based on a novel published by Ibrahim Waheed on Haveeru Daily in 2003. The film was a critical and commercial success while being considered as "one of the few acceptable horror film the Maldivian Film Industry has ever produced". It was later released as 15 episodes television series with inclusion of several clips that were edited off while released in theatre.

Muaz officially made his film debut in a leading role with Yoosuf Shafeeu-directed Hiyy Rohvaanulaa (2009) which features Shafeeu, Niuma Mohamed and Nadhiya Hassan alongside him. The film follows a blind man who regains his eyesight but decides to fake his blindness to discover her wife's affair with another man. Muaz played the role of Vishal, a ruthless and determined man who is ready to go extreme extent to win back his first love. The film received favorable reviews from critics and was a commercial success.

The following year he starred in Niuma Mohamed's directorial debut drama film Niuma (2010) alongside an ensemble cast including Mohamed, Yoosuf Shafeeu, Sheela Najeeb, Mohamed Manik, Aminath Rasheedha and Ahmed Nimal. He played the tolerant boyfriend who was unaware that his girlfriend was being sexually abused by her father and brother. Upon release, the film met with widespread critical acclaim specifically complimenting the performance of actors and its dialogues. Being able to screen over thirty housefull shows of the film, it was declared a Mega-Hit at box office, and the highest grossing Maldivian release of the year. The film fetched him a Gaumee Film Award for Best Supporting Actor and a nomination for Best Editing at 6th Gaumee Film Awards while winning in the same category at 1st Maldives Film Awards.

In 2013, Muaz starred opposite Ismail Rasheed in Ravee Farooq directed critically acclaimed experimental suspense thriller Ingili. It was based on fourteen years old Mohamed Hassaan's National Award-winning short story, Holhuasheege Ekuveriya. It celebrates the first Maldivian film to get recognized internationally by winning bronze medal in Best Feature Film category at SAARC Film Festival 2014 held in Colombo, Sri Lanka. He received another Gaumee Film Award nomination for Best Supporting Actor while winning a Maldives Film Award for Best Supporting Actor for his performance in the film.

In 2016, he featured alongside Niuma Mohamed, Yoosuf Shafeeu in Ibrahim Wisan's debut direction Vee Beyvafa which was shot in 2011. The film received a negative response from critics while Ahmed Adhushan of Mihaaru concluded his review calling the film "a step backward" in the progress of cinema.

== Media image ==
In 2018, he was ranked in the eighth position from Dho?'s list of Top Ten Actor of Maldives.

== Filmography ==
=== Feature film ===
Year	Title	Role	Notes	Ref(s)
2004	Edhathuru	Ahmed	Special appearance	
2006	Hukuru Vileyrey	Zaid		
2006	Heylaa	Ayya		
2009	Hiyy Rohvaanulaa	Vishal	Maldives Film Awards for Best Supporting Actor	
2010	Dhin Veynuge Hithaamaigaa	Himself	Special appearance in the song "Annaashey Hinithun Velamaa"	
2010	Niuma	Shiyaz	Gaumee Film Award for Best Supporting Actor	
2013	Ingili	Ammadey	Nominated—Gaumee Film Award for Best Supporting Actor; Maldives Film Award for Best Supporting Actor	
2016	Vee Beyvafa	Huzam		
2019	Leena	Ali Zuhoor	Also the director and editor	

=== Television ===
Year	Title	Role	Notes	Ref(s)
2003	Ujaalaa Raasthaa	Asim	Recurring role; 6 episodes	
2004	Vaisoori	Shiyaz	In the segment "An'dhiri Hayaaiy"	
2005	Baiveriyaa	Naseeh	Recurring role; 4 episodes	
2020	Huvaa	Azim	Main role	
2022	Biruveri Vaahaka	Akram	Main role; Episode "Loabiverin"	
2024	Yaaraa	Himself	Guest role; "Episode 49"	

=== Short film ===
Year	Title	Role	Notes	Ref(s)
2006	Vasvaas 1	Ali	Also the co-writer	
2006	Haa Shaviyani Rasgefaanu			
2006	Haa Shaviyani Rasgefaanu 2			
2007	Badi Edhuru	Mohamed Suheil		
2010	Loabeege Ninja	Presenter	Special appearance	

=== Other work ===
Year	Title	Director	Editor	Notes	Ref(s)
2006	Dheke Dhekeves 4		Yes	Short film	
2007	Farihibe 1		Yes	Short film	
2008	Farihibe 2		Yes	Short film	
2008	Faqeeru Koe		Yes	Short film	
2010	Muhammaage Briefcase		Yes	Short film	
2011	Farihibe 3	Yes	Yes	Short film	
2011	Siyaasee Vaccine	Yes	Yes	Short film	
2012	13 Ah Visnaa Dhehaas	Yes	Yes	Short film	
2013	Siyaasee Koalhun	Yes	Yes	Short film	
2013	Farihibe 4	Yes		Short film	
2016	Dhekey goiy	Yes		Office drama	
2019	Leena	Yes	Yes	Feature film	
2021	Hatharu Manzaru	Yes	Yes	Segment "Ruqyah"	
2024	Kamanaa		Yes	Feature film	
2025	Imthihaan	Yes		Web series; 10 episodes	
2025	Kan'bulo		Yes	Feature film	

== Discography ==
Year	Album/Film	Track	Co-artist(s)
2019	Leena	"Mee Ishq Hey"	Solo

== Accolades ==
Year	Award	Category	Nominated work	Result	Ref(s)
2011	1st Maldives Film Awards	Best Supporting Actor	Hiyy Rohvaanulaa	Won	
2011	1st Maldives Film Awards	Best Choreographer	"Haa Ufaa" - Hiyy Rohvaanulaa (Shared with Yoosuf Shafeeu)	Nominated	
2012	2nd Maldives Film Awards	Best Editing	Niuma	Won	
2012	2nd Maldives Film Awards	Best Director - Short film	Siyaasee Vaccine	Won	
2014	3rd Maldives Film Awards	Best Supporting Actor	Ingili	Won	
2014	3rd Maldives Film Awards	Best Director - Short film	Farihibe 4	Won	
2014	3rd Maldives Film Awards	Best Director - Short film	13 Ah Visnaa Dhehaas	Nominated	
2014	3rd Maldives Film Awards	Best Director - Short film	Siyaasee Koalhun	Nominated	
2014	3rd Maldives Film Awards	Best Editor - Short film	Siyaasee Koalhun	Won	
2014	3rd Maldives Film Awards	Best Editor - Short film	Farihibe 4	Nominated	
2015	6th Gaumee Film Awards	Best Supporting Actor	Niuma	Won	
2015	6th Gaumee Film Awards	Best Editing	Niuma	Nominated	
2016	7th Gaumee Film Awards	Best Supporting Actor	Ingili	Nominated	
2017	8th Gaumee Film Awards	Best Director - Short film	Farihibe 4	Nominated	
2017	8th Gaumee Film Awards	Best Editing - Short film	Farihibe 4	Nominated	
2017	8th Gaumee Film Awards	Best Editing - Short film	Farihibe 3	Nominated	
2023	3rd Karnataka International Film Festival	Best Director – Short Film	Ruqyah	Won	
