= Maldives Film Award for Best Actor =

- Awarded for: Best Actor
- Country: Maldives
- Presented by: Maldives Film Association

The Maldives Film Award for Best Actor is given as part of the Maldives Film Awards to an actor via a jury. The award was first given in 2011. Here is a list of the award winners and the nominees of the respective award ceremonies, classified by the awarded categories.

== Winners and nominees ==
Table key
Indicates the winner

=== Feature film ===
Year	Photos of winners	Actor	Film	Ref(s)
2011 (1st)		Yoosuf Shafeeu	Yoosuf	
2011 (1st)		Mohamed Manik	E Dharifulhu	
2011 (1st)		Mohamed Faisal	Loaiybahtakaa	
2011 (1st)		Yoosuf Shafeeu	E Dharifulhu	
2011 (1st)		Yoosuf Shafeeu	Yoosuf	
2012 (2nd)		Ismail Rasheed	Loodhifa	
2012 (2nd)		Ahmed Nimal	Niuma	
2012 (2nd)		Ahmed Saeed	Insaaf	
2012 (2nd)		Ali Seezan	Jinni	
2012 (2nd)		Yoosuf Shafeeu	Veeraana	
2014 (3rd)		Ismail Rasheed	Ingili	
2014 (3rd)		Ismail Rasheed	Dhilakani	
2014 (3rd)		Yoosuf Shafeeu	Fathis Handhuvaruge Feshun 3D	

=== Short film ===
Year	Photos of winners	Actor	Film	Ref(s)
2011 (1st)		Mohamed Abdulla	Faqeeru Koe	
2011 (1st)		No Other Nominee		
2012 (2nd)		Hussain Munawwar	Kudafoolhu	
2012 (2nd)		No Other Nominee		
2014 (3rd)		Mohamed Abdulla	Farihibe 4	
2014 (3rd)		Mohamed Abdulla	Siyaasee Koalhun	
2014 (3rd)		Mohamed Abdulla	13 Ah Visnaa Dhehaas	

== See also ==
- Maldives Film Awards
