= Moomin Fuad =

Maldivian filmmaker

- Occupations: director, cinematographer, screenwriter
- Years active: 2006–present

Moomin Fuad is a Maldivian film director, cinematographer and screenwriter known for the critically acclaimed films Heylaa (2006), Happy Birthday (2009) and Loodhifa (2011).

== Career ==
Moomin Fuad collaborated with Ali Shifau to direct the critically appreciated crime film Heylaa (2006) featuring a cast of Ismail Rasheed, Ahmed Mauroof, Zeenath Abbas, Lufshan Shakeeb and Abdulla Muaz. The film narrates the story of a fourteen years old ambitious boy who finds himself unknowingly being involved in the smuggling of a revolver. Apart from writing and directing the film, Fuad worked as the cinematographer, marking it as the first Maldivian film to be shot in high-definition digital video. Though the film received positive reviews from critics, it was a commercial failure. Co-director of the film Shifau opined that its commercial status was a result of casting "not very prominent" faces in the film and the "film-goers were not ready to accept the genre" at the time of release. Ahmed Nadheem from Haveeru praised the narration and plot of the film; "Moomin outshone everyone from the crew. From writing to direction and camera work, Fuad has kept every little detail on his mind and arranged the whole sequences the best it can be presented". At 5th Gaumee Film Awards ceremony, Fuad won the Best Story, Best Cinematography and Best Art Direction award.

Three year later, the duo reunited for a suspense thriller Happy Birthday (2009) which narrates the story of a simple man who receives a call on his birthday informing that his wife and son have been kidnapped, only to be returned for a ransom. The film was a commercial failure, despite the positive response from the critics. Winning five Gaumee Film Awards and twelve Maldives Film Awards, the film was also screened at the Venice Film Festival. Though the film received extremely positive reviews from critics with specific praise of Fuad, he admits to "regret" his involvement in the film; "I had to forgo my standards and several ethics for the development of this project. Beyond all the obstacles, I had to harm myself to complete filming Happy Birthday and I never intend on developing a similar project in the near future". At 1st Maldives Film Awards ceremony, Fuad was bestowed with Best Director, Best Screenplay, Best Art Direction, Best Original Song, Best Costume Designer and Best Sound Mixing award. At 6th Gaumee Film Awards, Fuad received the Best Director, Best Screenplay and Best Art Direction award.

It was followed by his crime tragedy drama Loodhifa (2011). Featuring an ensemble cast, the film deals with current social issues in society told from different perspectives of the characters. Made on a budget of MVR 600,000, the film was declared a commercial failure though it received wide critical acclaim, praising the performance of cast and the film's "realism" in its language, characters and their attitude. At the 7th Gaumee Film Awards he was bestowed with his second Gaumee Film Award for Best Director, Best Original Song, Best Screenplay and Best Art Direction. He also received a nomination as the Best Director at the 2nd Maldives Film Awards ceremony.

Fuad's first work of 2019 was the psychological horror thriller Nivairoalhi (2019), written and directed by Fuad, which marks Niuma Mohamed's last onscreen film. Produced by Mohamed, it revolves around a patient suffering from depression. Starring Mohamed, Yoosuf Shafeeu and Ahmed Asim in lead roles, the film received majorly positive reviews from critics; Aishath Maaha of Dho? favored the performance of the lead actors and mentioned the "neat arrangement" of its screenplay though pointed out its "weak ending" to be unsatisfactory. This was followed by the Ahmed Sinan-directed crime thriller Goh Raalhu (2019), penned by Fuad, which centers around the criminality and misdemeanor a young man has to deal with while trying to prove his truest intention of love. Upon release, the film received widespread positive reviews from critics; Aminath Luba of Sun called it a "five-star worthy blockbuster film" and wrote: "In the fast-paced action thriller, it is the plot twist at the end which grabs most eyeballs, all thanks to Fuad's exemplary writing". Stereotyped in a romantic avatar, several reviews and comments suggest that Jumayyil is preferable in the crime related roles. Later during the year, first Maldivian anthology film was released which credited Fuad as the director of the segment titled Baiveriya which focuses on the drug smuggling scene in Male'. The project was filmed in 2013 and digitally released six years later due to several delays in post-production, where the producer of the film criticizes Farooq for "failing" to complete his segment during the stipulated time period took over the post-production.

== Filmography ==
=== Feature film ===
Year	Title	Director	Screenplay	Cinematography	Ref(s)
2006	Heylaa	Yes	Yes	Yes	
2009	Happy Birthday	Yes	Yes	Yes	
2011	Loodhifa	Yes	Yes		
2011	Hithey Dheymee			Yes	
2017	Malikaa			Yes	
2019	Nivairoalhi	Yes	Yes		
2019	Goh Raalhu		Yes		
2025	Abadhah	Yes	Yes		

=== Television ===
Year	Title	Director	Screenplay	Camera	Ref(s)
2006	Dhafaraa	Yes	Yes	Yes	
2007	Reyfanaa			Yes	
2008	Inthihaa	Yes	Yes	Yes	
2008	Yaasmeen	Yes	Yes	Yes	
2008	FB!			Yes	
2008	Asarugaa	Yes		Yes	
2009	Silsilaa			Yes	
2019	Mhendhan		Yes		
2019	Hatharu Halha	Yes	Yes		
2019–2020	Maayoos			Yes	
2020	Gamini	Yes	Yes		
2022	Netheemey	Yes	Yes		

=== Short film ===
Year	Title	Director	Screenplay	Camera	Ref(s)
2007	Badi Edhuru		Yes	Yes	
2008	Ummeedh			Yes	
2011	Bodu 13 Muassasaa			Yes	
2014	Kashfu		Yes		
2021	Feehaali	Yes	Yes		

== Accolades ==
Year	Award	Category	Nominated work	Result	Ref(s)
2008	5th Gaumee Film Awards	Best Story	Heylaa	Won	
2008	5th Gaumee Film Awards	Best Cinematography	Heylaa	Won	
2008	5th Gaumee Film Awards	Best Art Direction	Heylaa (Shared with Ali Shifau)	Won	
2011	1st Maldives Film Awards	Best Director	Happy Birthday	Won	
2011	1st Maldives Film Awards	Best Screenplay	Happy Birthday	Won	
2011	1st Maldives Film Awards	Best Art Direction	Happy Birthday (Shared with Ali Shifau)	Won	
2011	1st Maldives Film Awards	Best Original Song	"Araamu" - Happy Birthday	Won	
2011	1st Maldives Film Awards	Best Cinematography	Happy Birthday	Won	
2011	1st Maldives Film Awards	Best Sound Mixing	Happy Birthday (Shared with Ali Shifau)	Won	
2012	2nd Maldives Film Awards	Best Director	Loodhifa	Nominated	
2012	2nd Maldives Film Awards	Best Art Direction	Loodhifa (Shared with Ismail Rasheed and Hussain Munawwar)	Won	
2015	6th Gaumee Film Awards	Best Director	Happy Birthday	Won	
2015	6th Gaumee Film Awards	Best Original Song	"Araamu" - Happy Birthday	Nominated	
2015	6th Gaumee Film Awards	Best Screenplay	Happy Birthday	Won	
2015	6th Gaumee Film Awards	Best Art Direction	Happy Birthday (Shared with Ali Shifau and Mohamed Ali)	Nominated	
2016	7th Gaumee Film Awards	Best Director	Loodhifa	Won	
2016	7th Gaumee Film Awards	Best Original Song	Loodhifa	Won	
2016	7th Gaumee Film Awards	Best Screenplay	Loodhifa	Won	
2016	7th Gaumee Film Awards	Best Art Direction	Loodhifa (Shared with Ismail Rasheed and Hussain Hussain Munawwar)	Won	
2019	PSM Office Drama Competition	Best Screenplay	Nakalu	Won	
2025	1st MSPA Film Awards	Best Story	Goh Raalhu	Nominated	
2025	1st MSPA Film Awards	Best Story	Nivairoalhi	Nominated	
2025	1st MSPA Film Awards	Best Original Screenplay	Goh Raalhu	Nominated	
