= Maldives Film Awards =

Maldivian film industry awards

- Current: 3rd Maldives Film Awards
- Trophy of the award
- Awarded for: Excellence in cinematic achievements
- Country: Maldives
- Presented by: Maldives Film Association
- First award: 2011

Television/radio coverage
- Network: Television Maldives

The Maldives Film Awards are presented by Maldives Film Association to honour both artistic and technical excellence of professionals in the Maldivian film industry. The ceremony had been sponsored by various private organizations in the past including Enchanteur and Ilsha. A live ceremony was broadcast to television audiences.

== History ==
The Maldives Film Awards were first introduced in 2011. In the first awards function, held on 2 July 2011, awards were given to films released in 2008 and 2009; picked from 5th Gaumee Film Awards held in 2007.

Ceremony	Awarded year	Awarded period	Ref(s)
1st Maldives Film Awards	2 July 2011	2008 — 2009	
2nd Maldives Film Awards	4 July 2012	2010 — 2011	
3rd Maldives Film Awards	29 April 2014	2012 — 2013	

The association attempted to host the fourth edition of the award in 2016, but it was cancelled following several delays. Later in 2020, the association announced the fourth ceremony of the award which got delayed further due to the COVID-19 pandemic.

== Awards ==
Awards are given in the following categories. Follow the links for lists of the award winners, year by year.

=== Feature films ===
- Maldives Film Award for Best Film
- Maldives Film Award for Best Director
- Maldives Film Award for Best Actor
- Maldives Film Award for Best Actress
- Best Supporting Actor
- Best Supporting Actress
- Best Male Debut
- Best Female Debut
- Original Song
- Best Lyricist
- Best Playback Singer – Male
- Best Playback Singer – Female
- Best Editing
- Best Cinematography
- Best Screenplay
- Best Background Music
- Best Sound Editing
- Best Sound Mixing
- Best Visual Effects
- Best Costume Design
- Best Makeup
- Best Choreography
- Best Film of the Year (Viewer's Choice)

=== Short films ===
- Maldives Film Award for Best Film
- Maldives Film Award for Best Director
- Maldives Film Award for Best Actor
- Maldives Film Award for Best Actress
- Best Supporting Actor
- Best Supporting Actress
- Best Editing
- Best Cinematography
- Best Screenplay
- Best Makeup

=== Special awards ===
- Lifetime Achievement Award
