= List of Maldivian films of 2007 =

This is a list of Maldivian films released in 2007.

== Releases ==
=== Feature film ===
Opening		Title	Director	Studio	Cast
JUN	28	Aharen	Mohamed Shareef	NCA / UNFP	Nashidha Mohamed, Ahmed Asim, Fauziyya Hassan

=== Short film ===
Opening		Title	Director	Studio	Cast
JAN	28	Handi Ganduvaru Dhonkamana	Ali Seezan	C-Xanal Movies	Niuma Mohamed, Lufshan Shakeeb, Ali Seezan, Ahmed Asim
FEB	28	Jinni Edhurube	Amjad Ibrahim		Shaulam, Ismail Nuvail, Hamid Ali, Fauziyya Hassan, Naaz
MAR	04	Santhi Mariyan'bu 2	Amjad Ibrahim		Mariyam Haleem, Zeenath Abbas, Mariyam Shahuza, Husnee
MAR	19	Kudafoolhaai Paree Dhahtha	Amjad Ibrahim	Kid Production	Hussain Munawwar, Sheela Najeeb, Hamid Ali, Rayyan, Lamya
APR	08	Neenaa	Ali Seezan	C-xanal Movies	Ali Seezan, Aishath Siyadha, Ahmed Saeed
APR	11	Loaraiybe			
APR	11	Ossunu Iraaeku	Ahmed Nimal	ASH Productions	Yoosuf Shafeeu, Mariyam Afeefa, Ahmed Nimal, Arifa Ibrahim, Ali Riyaz
APR	15	Minikaa Dhaitha	Mohamed Nasheed	Moviepeople Studio	Nashidha Mohamed, Aiman
APR	18	Vasvaas 2	Yoosuf Shafeeu	Eupe Productions	Yoosuf Shafeeu, Ali Riyaz, Nashidha Ahmed, Mariyam Shahuza
MAY	02	Aiminaabee Aai Handi	Amjad Ibrahim		Ahmed Nisham
MAY	02	Haa Shaviyani Rasgefaanu	Ahmed Falah	Dhekedheke Ves Productions	Mohamed Abdulla, Ismail Rasheed, Ravee Farooq
MAY	29	Thandi Rondi		2 N R Production	Ali Seezan, Mohamed Afrah, Ahmed Shibau
MAY	30	Vasvaas 3	Yoosuf Shafeeu	Eupe Productions	Yoosuf Shafeeu, Ali Riyaz, Nashidha Ahmed, Mariyam Shahuza
JUN	03	Bunyey Bunyey	Ahmed Falah	Dhekedheke Ves Productions	Mohamed Abdulla, Ismail Rasheed, Nadhiya Hassan, Aishath Siyadha
JUN	08	Foolhu Dhigu Handi 2	Amjad Ibrahim		Mohamed Naseem, Neena Saleem, Mohamed Saeed
JUN	13	Kuri Inthizaaruge Nimun	Mohamed Nasheed	Moviepeople Investment	Nashidha Mohamed, Ahmed Asim, Hamid Ali, Ahmed Saeed, Aishath Rasheedha
JUN	13	Haa Shaviyani Rasgefaanu 2		Dhekedheke Ves Productions	Mohamed Abdulla, Ismail Rasheed, Ravee Farooq
JUN	19	Farihibe 1	Ahmed Falah	Dhekedheke Ves Productions	Mohamed Abdulla, Nadhiya Hassan, Ismail Rasheed
JUN	24	Loabeegaa Dhon U	Ali Rasheed	Stepin, Sim Quarts	Ismail Rasheed, Khadheeja Mohamed
JUN	27	Vigani	Ali Seezan	C-xanal Movies	Ali Seezan, Mariyam Afeefa, Lufshan Shakeeb
JUL	05	Hiyy Ekaniveemaa	Ahmed Falah	Dhekedheke Ves Productions	Ahmed Latheef, Aishath Siyadha, Aminath Ameela, Ibrahim Riyaz
JUL	07	Jinneenge Dharubaaru	Amjad Ibrahim	Learner's Production	Hamid Ali, Ahmed Saeed, Ali Shameel
JUL	10	Nudhaashe Dhookohfaa Loabivaa	Mohamed Shamaail	Stepin Productions	Mariyam Afeefa, Lufshan Shakeeb, Mohamed Afrah, Hamid Ali, Aminath Shareef
JUL	11	Dhalhamathi	Ahmed Ziya	Island Motion Production	Ahmed Ziya, Sujeetha Abdulla, Naashidha Mohamed, Aminath Shareef
JUL	25	Magey Dharifulhu	Shareefa Fakhri	S.S.A Production	Ahmed Asim, Aminath Shifana Abbas, Khadheeja Ibrahim Didi, Aminath Shareef
JUL	26	Fenu Paree	Ali Seezan	C-xanal Movies	Lufshan Shakeeb, Aishath Siyadha, Mariyam Afeefa, Muslima Abdulla, Nashidha Mohamed
SEP	01	E Soru	Ahmed Latheef	—	Ismail Rasheed, Ali Shameel, Neena Saleem, Aminath Rana, Mohamed Azzam
SEP	07	Haa Shaviyani Rasgefaanu 3		Dhekedheke Ves Productions	Mohamed Abdulla, Ismail Rasheed, Ravee Farooq
SEP	16	Umurahvess Inthizaaru Kuraanan	Ahmed Azmeel; Aishath Rishmy	Yaaraa Productions	Ahmed Azmeel, Aishath Rishmy, Aminath Rasheedha, Mariyam Shahuza, Asim
OCT	03	Nukan'daa 2	Mohamed Shareef	Redline Movies	Lufshan Shakeeb, Sujeetha Abdulla, Ahmed Ziya, Ali Shameel, Naashidha Mohamed
OCT	07	Tarzan	Ayaz	Style Movies	Mohamed Rujaan Bun Ayaz, Ahmed Vishal Ali, Aishath Raisha
OCT	11	Edhonveli Thundi 1	Yoosuf Shafeeu	Eupe Production	Yoosuf Shafeeu, Ali Riyaz, Fathimath Fareela, Mariyam Shahuza, Moosa Nazeem
OCT	24	Fahu Sofha	Ahmed Nimal	Ash Production	Ali Seezan, Niuma Mohamed, Lufshan Shakeeb, Nashidha Mohamed
NOV	01	Vasvaas 4	Yoosuf Shafeeu	Eupe Productions	Yoosuf Shafeeu, Ali Riyaz, Nashidha Ahmed, Mariyam Shahuza
NOV	08	Paneeno	Ahmed Nimal; Ibrahim Wisan	Kid Production	Lufshan Shakeeb, Niuma Mohamed, Hussain Munawwar
NOV	12	Handi Ganduvaru Dhonkamana 2½	Ali Seezan	C-xanal Movies	Lufshan Shakeeb, Niuma Mohamed, Ali Seezan
NOV	15	E Soru 2	Ahmed Latheef		Ismail Rasheed, Ali Shameel, Neena Saleem, Aminath Rana, Mohamed Azzam
NOV	22	Barbafar	Mohamed Shamaail		Ahmed Asim, Sujeetha Abdulla, Ahmed Ziya, Hussain Shibau
NOV	24	Nama Nama Usmaan	Ahmed Latheef		Ismail Rasheed, Ali Shameel, Nashidha Mohamed, Aminath Rana
NOV	26	Kandu Vigani	Ali Seezan	C-xanal Movies	Ali Seezan, Lufshan Shakeeb, Mariyam Afeefa
DEC	11	Handi Kujjaa	Ahmed Falah	Dhekedheke Ves Productions	Aminath Ameela, Ibrahim Riyaz, Ibrahim Naseer, Mohamed Ahmed, Thollath, Ameedhu, Shifana
DEC	29	Badi Edhuru	Ali Shifau	Dark Rain Entertainment	Ismail Rasheed, Abdulla Muaz, Ibrahim Jihad, Ravee Farooq, Aishath Siyadha, Nadhiya Hassan
DEC	30	An'dhiri Rey	Hussain Shakir	IF Productions	Niuma Mohamed, Ibrahim Sobah

=== Television ===
This is a list of Maldivian series, in which the first episode was aired or streamed in 2007.

Opening		Title	Director	Cast	Notes
FEB	19	Thiya Loabeegai...	Ali Seezan	Ali Seezan, Nadhiya Hassan	13 Episodes
SEP	16	Aharenge Lha Daddy	Abdul Faththaah	Hassan Afeef, Neena Saleem, Khadheeja Ibrahim Didi, Ibrahim Jihad, Fauziyya Hassan	5 Episodes
NA		Kalaa Dheke Varah Loabivey	Mohamed Manik	Mohamed Manik, Sheela Najeeb, Ibrahim Jihad, Aminath Ameela	
NA		Reyfanaa	Ali Shifau	Mohamed Manik, Niuma Mohamed, Ismail Rasheed, Roanu Hassan Manik, Fauziyya Hassan	14 Episodes
NA		Vamey Kaireegaa Kalaa	Abdul Faththaah	Mariyam Afeefa, Ibrahim Jihad, Amira Ismail	
NA		Vimlaa	Arifa Ibrahim	Mariyam Afeefa, Lufshan Shakeeb, Ahmed Asim, Nashidha Mohamed, Aminath Shareef	26 Episodes
NA		Wafaatheri Nuvevunas	Arifa Ibrahim	Mohamed Faisal, Amira Ismail, Aishath Gulfa, Aminath Shareef	26 Episodes

== See also ==
- Lists of Maldivian films
