= List of Maldivian films of 2010 =

This is a list of Maldivian films released in 2010.

== Releases ==
=== Theatre releases ===
Opening		Title	Genre	Director	Cast	Ref.
JAN	13	Mi Hiyy Keekkuraanee?	Romance/horror	Amjad Ibrahim	Mohamed Manik, Sheela Najeeb, Mohamed Shavin, Mariyam Afeefa, Ahmed Asim	
JAN	28	Jinni	Horror	Abdul Faththaah	Ali Seezan, Mariyam Afeefa, Amira Ismail, Aminath Rasheedha	
MAR	9	Maafeh Neiy	Family drama	Ali Seezan	Ali Seezan, Niuma Mohamed, Roanu Hassan Manik, Koyya Hassan Manik	
APR	5	Dhin Veynuge Hithaamaigaa	Family drama	Ali Shifau	Yoosuf Shafeeu, Niuma Mohamed, Ali Seezan, Mohamed Manik, Ravee Farooq	
APR	26	Zalzalaa En'buri Aun	Horror	Ahmed Nimal	Sheela Najeeb, Yoosuf Shafeeu, Mohamed Manik, Lufshan Shakeeb	
MAY	28	Veeraana	Drama	Yoosuf Shafeeu	Yoosuf Shafeeu, Niuma Mohamed, Amira Ismail	
JUN	14	Fanaa	Drama	Aishath Rishmy	Aishath Rishmy, Ahmed Azmeel, Aminath Rasheedha, Zeenath Abbas	
OCT	25	Niuma	Drama	Niuma Mohamed	Niuma Mohamed, Yoosuf Shafeeu, Sheela Najeeb, Mohamed Manik, Ahmed Nimal	
NOV	9	Mendhamuge Evaguthu	Horror	Yoosuf Shafeeu; Amjad Ibrahim	Yoosuf Shafeeu, Fathimath Fareela, Ahmed Fizam, Amira Ismail	
DEC	4	Vakinuvinama	Romance/horror	Amjad Ibrahim	Niuma Mohamed, Ali Seezan, Ravee Farooq	
DEC	28	Heyonuvaane	Romance	Yoosuf Shafeeu	Yoosuf Shafeeu, Sheela Najeeb, Fathimath Fareela, Lufshan Shakeeb	

=== Short film ===
Opening		Title	Director	Studio	Cast
FEB	01	Keevvehey Vakivee Yaaraa?	Ahmed Ziya	Cirrus Production	Ali Seezan, Khadheeja Ibrahim Didi, Ahmed Ziya, Mariyam Shahuza
MAR	04	Loabeege Ninja	Ahmed Nimal	Dhekedheke Ves Production	Mohamed Abdulla, Fathimath Azifa, Mohamed Manik, Ahmed Nimal
MAR	17	Muhammaage Briefcase	Ahmed Nimal	Dhekedheke Ves Production	Mohamed Abdulla, Sheela Najeeb, Mohamed Manik, Ahmed Nimal
MAR	26	Dhanna Nudhanna 2	Ahmed Falah	My-Studio	Ali Shameel, Ismail Rasheed, Zeenath Abbas, Ali Firaq
MAY	28	Lollypop	Ahmed Rasheed	Animation Studio	Ali Azim, Mariyam Shahuza, Ahmed Manik, Aminath Shareef
OCT	02	The Tree	Ahmed Nimal		Niuma Mohamed, Aminath Naseera, Niyaz, Lufshan Shakeeb
OCT	25	Fahun Rangalhuvaane 2	Ali Shameel	Noor Movies	Ali Shameel, Ismail Rasheed, Aminath Shareef, Nashidha Mohamed
DEC	12	Koru Ibilees En'buri Aun	Mohamed Aboobakuru		Shifau Mohamed, Nimal Mausoom
DEC	12	Maafkuraashey Kalaa	Ahmed Ziya	Actional Movies	Ahmed Ziya, Ahmed Latheef, Aminath Ameela, Aishath Rasheedha, Naashidha Mohamed
DEC	13	Crime Petrol-1: Nuva Aharuge Anhen Kujjehge Nimun	Mohamed Nasheedh	Farivaa School Of Arts	Ahmed Ziya, Nashidha Mohamed, Aminath Amaanee Rasheedh
NA		Dhekafi	Mohamed Shavin	Rhythm	Mohamed Shavin, Mariyam Afeefa, Nashidha Mohamed, Arifa Ibrahim
NA		Nu Ufan Dhari	Ibrahim Wisan	Dash Studio	Mohamed Manik, Sheela Najeeb, Mohamed Shavin, Mariyam Haleem, Mariyam Shakeela
NA		Magey Yaagoothu	Ismail Rasheed	Kid Production; Farivaa Films	Ismail Rasheed, Lufshan Shakeeb, Nashidha Mohamed, Ajnaz Ali
NA		Kudafoolhu	Ibrahim Wisan	Fariva Films	Ismail Rasheed, Hussain Munawwar, Ajnaz Ali, Adam Mueen, Mariyam Samira, Mishan Adam

=== Television ===
This is a list of Maldivian series, in which the first episode was aired or streamed in 2010.

Opening		Title	Director	Cast	Notes
AUG	11	14 February	Ahmed Saeed	Fathimath Azifa, Ahmed Asim, Ahmed Saeed, Ahmed Shah	4 Episodes
AUG	13	Thiya Loabeegai Abadhahme Vaanamey	Mohamed Manik	Mohamed Manik, Sheela Najeeb, Nadhiya Hassan	4 Episodes
AUG	16	Diary	Ahmed Shah	Mariyam Zuhura, Lufshan Shakeeb, Aminath Shareef, Ali Firaq, Ahmed Saeed	4 Episodes
NA		Sirrun Hithaa Kulhelaafa	Ahmed Nimal	Ahmed Latheef, Aminath Ameela, Mariyam Shakeela, Amira Ismail	10 episodes
