= List of Maldivian films of 2009 =

This is a list of Maldivian films released in 2009.

== Releases ==
=== Feature film ===
Opening		Title	Director	Studio	Cast
FEB	1	Udhabaani	Amjad Ibrahim	Learner's Production	Yoosuf Shafeeu, Amira Ismail, Hamid Ali, Aminath Shareef, Hussain Solah
MAR	29	Hiyy Rohvaanulaa	Yoosuf Shafeeu	Dhekedheke Ves Productions	Yoosuf Shafeeu, Niuma Mohamed, Abdulla Muaz, Nadhiya Hassan
APR	7	Karuna Vee Beyvafa	Ali Seezan	C-Xanal Movies	Ali Seezan, Niuma Mohamed, Nadhiya Hassan, Arifa Ibrahim, Koyya Hassan Manik
MAY	25	Happy Birthday	Moomin Fuad	Dark Rain Entertainment	Yoosuf Shafeeu, Niuma Mohamed, Ahmed Asim, Ahmed Saeed, Ismail Nuweil
NOV	8	Loaiybahtakaa	Yoosuf Shafeeu	Eupe Productions	Yoosuf Shafeeu, Sheela Najeeb, Fathimath Fareela, Mohamed Faisal, Ahmed Nimal, Fauziyya Hassan
NA		Baaraige Fas	Amjad Ibrahim	Eleven Eleven Productions	Hussain Sobah, Mariyam Nisha, Amira Ismail, Ali Shameel, Mariyam Shakeela, Hussain Solah, Ahmed Azmeel
NA		E Dharifulhu	Ahmed Nimal	Eupe Production	Niuma Mohamed, Yoosuf Shafeeu, Sheela Najeeb, Mohamed Manik, Ahmed Nimal

=== Television ===
This is a list of Maldivian series, in which the first episode was aired or streamed in 2009.

Opening		Title	Director	Cast	Notes
JUL	1	Vakinuvaan Bunefaa Vaudheh Nuvanhey?	Hassan Haleem	Ahmed Latheef, Fathimath Azifa, Ibrahim Jihad, Aminath Ameela, Mariyam Shahuza	13 episodes
AUG	21	Mohamma Gaadiyaa	Hassan Haleem	Mohamed Abdulla, Niuma Mohamed, Ismail Rasheed	5 Episodes
NA		Mihithah Loabi Dheyshey	Aishath Rishmy	Ahmed Azmeel, Aishath Rishmy, Mariyam Shakeela	
NA		Silsilaa	Ali Shifau	Ahmed Asim, Fathimath Azifa, Khadheeja Ibrahim Didi, Nashmee, Hamdhoon Farooq	5 Episodes
NA		Sirru Sirrun Kalaa	Abdul Faththaah	Ibrahim Jihad, Fathimath Azifa, Khadheeja Ibrahim Didi, Ahmed Ishaar, Neena Saleem	
NA		Ssshhh... Miee Sirreh!	Ahmed Saeed	Amira Ismail, Lufshan Shakeeb, Nashidha Mohamed, Ahmed Saeed, Ali Firaaq	5 Episodes

=== Short film ===
Opening		Title	Director	Studio	Cast
JAN	22	Burraas Jinni	Ahmed Saeed		Ahmed Saeed
JAN	22	Kafun	Ali Seezan	Redline Movies	Ali Seezan, Niuma Mohamed, Nadhiya Hassan, Ali Fizam
JAN	29	Fahun Rangalhuvaane	Ali Shameel	Noor Movies	Ali Shameel, Ismail Rasheed, Zeenath Abbas, Naashidha Mohamed
APR	8	Dhanna Nudhanna	Ahmed Falah	My-Studio	Ismail Rasheed, Ali Shameel, Ali Firaq, Zeenath Abbas
APR	8	E Vaguthu	Yoosuf Shafeeu	Eupe Production	Yoosuf Shafeeu, Fathimath Fareela, Ali Fizam
APR	27	Dheulhi Ehnuvi Dhiulhi	Mohamed Rasheed	Art-x Studio	Ali Shameel, Ismail Rasheed, Aminath Ameela, Nashidha Mohamed
APR	28	Pink Fairy	Ibrahim Wisan	Dash Studio	Mariyam Afeefa, Hussain Solah, Aishath Maani, Nadhiya Hassan, Yooshau Jameel
APR	28	01 January	Yoosuf Shafeeu	Eupe Production	Yoosuf Shafeeu, Yoosuf Zuhuree, Hamdhan Farooq, Mohamed Rifshan
JUN	23	Beyinsaafu	Ismail Rasheed	KMR Production	Ali Shameel, Ismail Rasheed, Nashidha Mohamed, Ahmed Malik, Aminath Shareef
NOV	08	Seedhibe	Ali Seezan	C-Xanal Movies	Hussain Nooradeen, Sunil, Nadhiya Hassan, Yooshau Jameel, Mohamed Rifshan
NOV	08	Raul	Ahmed Shiham		Ahmed Shiham, Aminath Naseera
NOV	08	Lhakoe	Ibrahim Wisan	Movie People	Ali Seezan, Lufshan Shakeeb, Mariyam Siyadha
NOV	08	Kalaage Handhaanuga	Ahmed Asim	Movie People	Ahmed Asim, Maisha, Ajunaz Ali, Nashidha Mohamed
NOV	08	Aharennah Loabi Nuvevununama	Mohamed Aboobakuru		Shafiu
NOV	30	Fahun Rangalhuvaane 2	Ali Shameel	Noor Movies	Ali Shameel, Ismail Rasheed, Zeenath Abbas, Naashidha Mohamed
DEC	03	Bulhaa Dhombe	Yoosuf Shafeeu	The Crystal Entertainment	Sheela Najeeb, Abdulla Mahir, Fathimath Aflaz Faisal
DEC	03	Dheke Dhekeves 5	Hassan Haleem	Dheke Dhekeves Production	Mohamed Abdulla, Amira Ismail, Nadhiya Hassan
DEC	29	Santhi Mariyan'bu 3	Amjad Ibrahim	Noor Movies	Hamid Ali, Mariyam Haleem, Hussain Shibau, Fathimath Azifa, Ali Ahmed

== See also ==
- Lists of Maldivian films
