= List of Maldivian films of 2008 =

This is a list of Maldivian films released in 2008.

== Releases ==
=== Feature film ===
Opening		Title	Director	Studio	Cast
JUL	1	Yoosuf	Fathimath Nahula	Crystal Entertainment	Yoosuf Shafeeu, Niuma Mohamed, Ahmed Nimal, Sheela Najeeb, Mohamed Manik, Ahmed Lais Asim
AUG	1	Khalaas	Ahmed Nimal	C-Xanal Movies	Ali Seezan, Mariyam Afeefa, Nadhiya Hassan, Ahmed Nimal

=== Television ===
This is a list of Maldivian series, in which the first episode was aired or streamed in 2008.

Opening		Title	Director	Cast	Notes
JUL	08	Dhekunu Huvafen	Ibrahim Wisan	Ibrahim Jihad, Zeenath Abbas, Ahmed Asim, Nashidha Mohamed	5 Episodes
NA		Asarugai...	Ali Shifau	Hamdhoon Farooq, Aminath Ameela, Roanu Hassan Manik, Aminath Shareef	5 Episodes
NA		FB!	Ahmed Saeed	Ahmed Saeed, Ahmed Nimal, Fathimath Azifa, Ibrahim Jihad, Ahmed Asim, Ahmed Ziya	5 Episodes
NA		Hama Ekani Kalaayahtakai	Mohamed Manik	Mohamed Manik, Mariyam Azza, Sheela Najeeb, Aminath Rasheedha	5 episodes
NA		Hammaa Muhammaa		Mohamed Abdulla, Sheela Najeeb, Mohamed Manik	5 Episodes
NA		Hanaa		Fathimath Azifa	
NA		Inthihaa	Moomin Fuad	Niuma Mohamed, Mohamed Manik, Sheela Najeeb	13 Episodes
NA		Just Friends	Ali Seezan	Ali Seezan, Nadhiya Hassan	
NA		Kushakaanulaa Shazaa Nudheyshey		Aminath Ameela, Ahmed Latheef, Ahmed Ziya, Mariyam Shahuza	
NA		Loabi Nuviyas Firumaaladhee	Ahmed Saeed	Fathimath Azifa, Ahmed Saeed	
NA		Loabin Hiyy Furenee	Ahmed Ziya	Ahmed Asim, Khadheeja Ibrahim Didi, Zeenath Abbas, Ahmed Ziya, Fathimath Azifa	13 Episodes
NA		Manzilakee Thee Ey Magey	Shareefa Fakhry	Ahmed Asim, Mariyam Afeefa, Khadheeja Ibrahim Didi	26 Episodes
NA		Soora	Fathimath Nahula; Yoosuf Shafeeu	Ali Ahmed, Amira Ismail, Aminath Ameela, Abdulla Maahir, Arifa Ibrahim, Aminath Shareef	5 Episodes
NA		Umurah Ekee Ulhen Bunefaa	Mohamed Shamaail	Lufshan Shakeeb, Mariyam Afeefa, Ahmed Asim, Amira Ismail, Zeenath Abbas	
NA		Yaasmin	Moomin Fuad	Mohamed Manik, Sheela Najeeb, Ahmed Saeed, Ahmed Nimal	5 Episodes

=== Short film ===
Opening		Title	Director	Studio	Cast
JAN	10	Guest House Room Number:201	Amjad Ibrahim	V Stream Production	Mohamed Shavin, Khadheeja Ibrahim Didi, Aminath Ameela, Hussain Solah
JAN	28	No Money Full Beggy	Mariyam Nisha	Style Movie	Ahmed Ayaz, Aminath Ameela
FEB	12	Erey	Ravee Farooq	Antharys Production	Ravee Farooq, Niuma Mohamed, Hamdhoon Farooq, Ibrahim Hamdhan
FEB	18	Vathukiba	Ahmed Falah	Dhekedheke Ves Productions	Mohamed Abdulla, Nadhiya Hassan, Zeenath Abbas, Ahmed Falah
FEB	27	Salhibe 2	Yoosuf Shafeeu		Hussain Nooradeen, Mariyam Shahuza, Sujeetha Abdulla
MAR	25	Edhonveli Thundi 2	Yoosuf Shafeeu	Eupe Production	Yoosuf Shafeeu, Ali Riyaz, Fathimath Fareela, Mariyam Shahuza, Moosa Nazeem
MAR	25	Kafi Kafi Loabi	Ayaz		Neena Saleem, Nashidha Mohamed, Malik, Ibrahim Naseer
MAR	30	Haa Shaviyani Rasgefaanu 4	Ahmed Falah, Ravee Farooq	Dhekedheke Ves Productions	Mohamed Abdulla, Ismail Rasheed, Abdulla Muaz, Aminath Ameela
MAY	3	Prince Of Madagaskara	Ali Seezan	Redline Movies	Lufshan Shakeeb, Ali Seezan, Muslima Abdulla
MAY	19	Kan'du Fureytha	Mohamed Aboobakuru		Mohamed Aboobakuru
JUN	05	Farihibe 2	Ahmed Falah	Dhekedheke Ves Productions	Mohamed Abdulla, Mariyam Azza, Ismail Rasheed, Aminath Rasheedha, Hamdhan Farooq
JUN	10	Umurah Salaam	Ahmed Nimal	Creative Movies	Ismail Rasheed, Mariyam Afeefa, Lufshan Shakeeb, Aminath Ameela
JUN	23	Ummeedh	Ali Shifau	Dark Rain Entertainment	Mohamed Manik, Ahmed Asim, Ibrahim Jihad, Hamdhoon Farooq, Sheela Najeeb
JUN	23	Fini Fini Rey	Mohamed Afrah		Lufshan Shakeeb, Mariyam Afeefa, Ahmed Shah, Muslima
JUL	9	Lost Island	Ahmed Asim	Moviepeople	Ahmed Asim, Ajnaz Ali, Nanni
JUL	10	The Boat	Ahmed Ziya; Ibrahim Wisan	Moviepeople; Redline Movies	Ahmed Ziya, Mariyam Shahuza, Ajnaz Ali, Shaheen
JUL	16	Dhanthura	Ahmed Latheef	Actional Movies	Ismail Rasheed, Ali Shameel, Aminath Ameela, Ali Ahmed, Mariyam Shahuza
AUG	22	E Sirru	Yoosuf Shafeeu	Stepin Production	Yoosuf Shafeeu, Sheela Najeeb, Mohamed Manik
NOV	18	Girlfriend	Ahmed Shiham	Luyu Production	Ahmed Shiham, Fathimath Azifa, Neena Saleem, Hassan Afeef, Hamid Ali
NOV	26	Paruvaanaa	Ismail Rasheed	Noor Movies	Ismail Rasheed, Hussain Shibau, Mariyam Siyadha, Mohamed Rifshan
DEC	1	Kurafi Dhaadha	Amjad Ibrahim	—	Mohamed Afrah, Ahmed Ziya, Nashidha Mohamed, Hamid Ali, Hamdhoon Farooq
DEC	05	Noonekey Nubunaashey	Mohamed Shamaiel	Moviepeople	Ahmed Asim, Mariyam Afeefa, Lufshan Shakeeb, Mariyam Shahuza, Aminath Shareef
DEC	31	Faqeeru Koe	Ahmed Falah	Dhekedheke Ves Productions	Mohamed Abdulla, Sheela Najeeb

== See also ==
- Lists of Maldivian films
