= Unoosha =

Maldivian singer (born 1985)

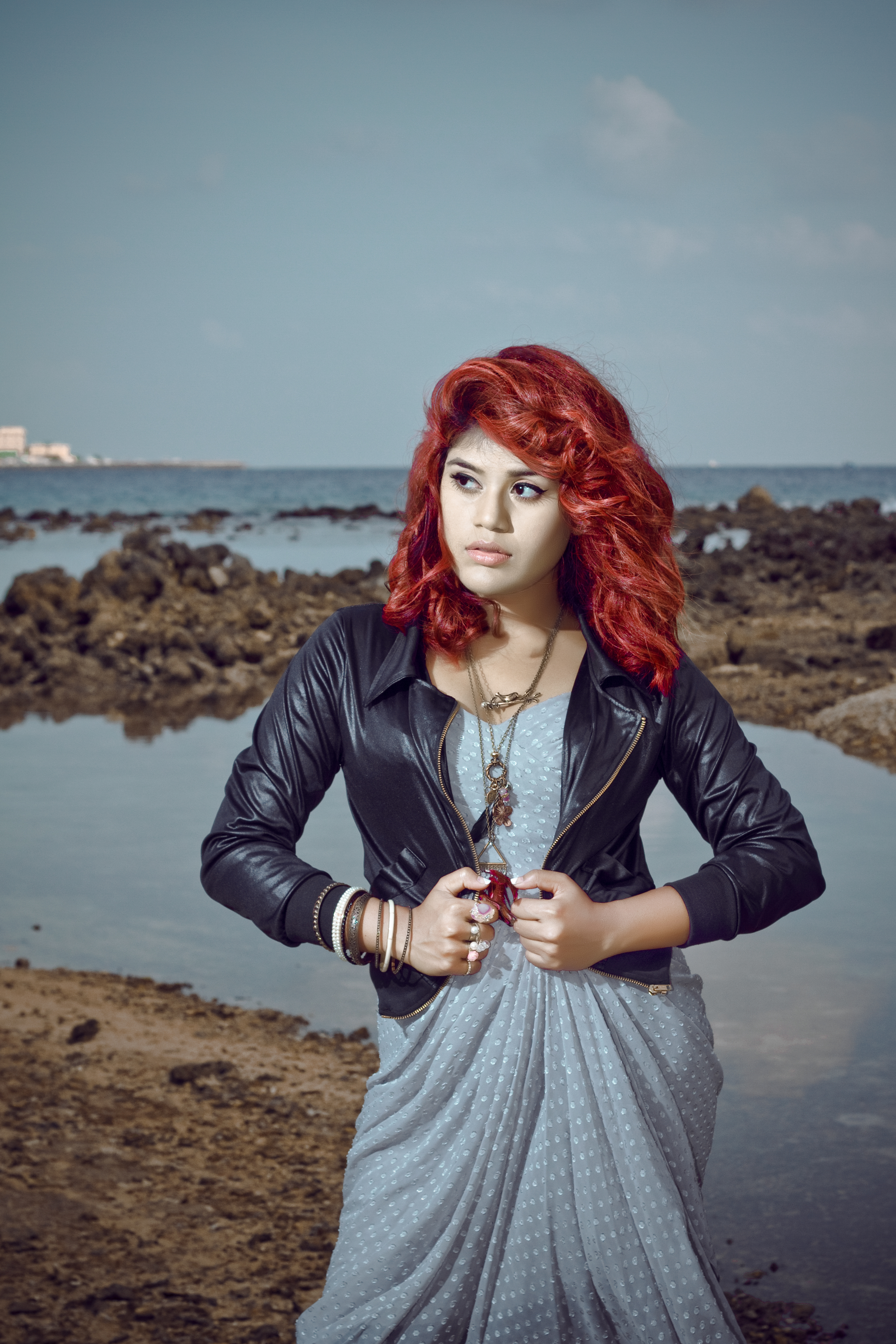
Unoosha Photoshoot for Lavish magazine. Phototaken by Funkographic

Mariyam Unoosha (born 6 October 1985), known mononymously as Kiddy, is a Maldivian female singer and songwriter. Her parents were in the 90s famous band "Olympians". She has won many awards and has performed in various high caliber shows in Maldives and abroad.

== Life and career ==
=== Early life ===
Unoosha was born on 6 October 1985 in Malé to Shafeega Abdul Latheef, a playback singer and Imaadh Ismail, a musician. Owing to the influence of her parents, she started singing at a young age. She attended Aminiya School and during her time there, won 1st place in the Inter School Music Competition and became the first ever female vocalist to win the competition 3 times.

After a year since she finished her O’levels, she took up an offer from a local music band called Amazon Jade and worked with the band for 4 years. Now with over 100 studio recordings to her name, many albums which release in Maldives have songs by Unoosha. Since then she has hosted a music show for kids for 2 seasons titled Lets Sing With Kiddy. She has also performed at Mariah Carey's wedding renewal ceremony at Reethi Rah resort.

=== Bollywood career ===
Unoosha made her bollywood debut with the 2012 Pooja Bhatt-directed erotic thriller film Jism 2. She got the chance while she was in India at the South Asian Film Festival, which was held in Goa. Bhatt heard Unoosha sing at the festival and felt that there was something unique in her voice. Pooja then met the singer and offered her to sing for her film and Unoosha readily agreed. The song titled "Hey Walla" was composed by Abdul Basit Sayeed, and written by Unoosha herself along with Sayeed.

Unoosha recorded her second Bollywood song along with Ali Azmat and KK, for the upcoming Jism franchise. The song titled "Kahaan Se Karen Shuru" is composed by Arko Pravo Mukherjee. This would be the first Bollywood song Unoosha recorded in Hindi.

== Discography ==
=== Feature Film ===
Year	Film	Song	Lyricist(s)	Co-Artist(s)
1998	Ethoofaaneerey	"Bappaa Loabi Bappaa"	Mausoom Shakir	Imaadh Ismail
2001	Dheevaanaa	"Veyney Mee Hithugaa Aalaavaa"	Mariyam Waheedha	Solo
2002	Aan... Aharenves Loabivin	"Aan Aharenves Loabivin"	Abdul Faththaah	Solo
2003	Araamagu Dhonkamana	"Heekuranee Mee Thedhey"		Solo
2003	Vehey Vaarey Therein	"Yaaraa Ey Loaiybeh Nuveyhey"	Easa Shareef	Mohamed Zaidh
2005	Hureemey Inthizaarugaa	"Ulhenee Thi Dhurah Dhaan"	Easa Shareef	Mukhthar Adam
2007	Aharen	"Hiyy Ufaavaa Hin'dhu"	Aminath Faiza	Solo
2008	Yoosuf	"Masthee Masthee"	Adam Haleem Adhnan	Solo
2008	Khalaas	"Haadha Dhahivethi Belumekey"	Amir Saleem	Ali Seezan
2008	Khalaas	"Haadha Dhahivethi Belumekey" (Remix version)	Amir Saleem	Ali Seezan
2010	Veeraana	"Veeraanaa" (Promotional Song)	Adam Haleem Adhnan	Various
2010	Niuma	"Gaimey Hithaa Vindhugaa" (Bonus Song)	Mohamed Abdul Ghanee	Mohamed Abdul Ghanee
2011	Loodhifa	"Nethifanaa"	Mohamed Abdul Ghanee	Mohamed Fuadh (Ford)
2011	Loodhifa	"Loodhifaa" (Remix Version)	Mohamed Abdul Ghanee	Mohamed Fuadh (Ford)
2011	Sazaa	"Sazaa" (Theme Song)	Mohamed Abdul Ghanee	Solo
2011	Wathan	"Balaaleemaa Loabin"		Ibrahim Zaid Ali
2013	Dhilakani	"Laslahun"		
2014	24 Gadi Iru	"Forever In Love"	Mohamed Ikram	Solo
2014	24 Gadi Iru	"Destiny"		Abdul Baasith

=== Television ===
Year	Name	Song	Lyricist(s)	Co-Artist(s)
2006	Ikhthiyaaru	"Hiyy Dheebalaashey"	Adam Haleem Adhnan	Solo
2013	Adhives Eloaibah Gadharu Kuran 2	"Vakivedhiyayas Adhu Midhuniyeyn"	Adam Haleem Adhnan	Ibrahim Zaid Ali

=== Non-film songs ===
Year	Album	Song	Lyricist(s)	Co-Artist(s)
N/A	N/A	"Qaumaa Wathanaa Farudhunney Dhen"		Solo
N/A	N/A	"Fendhee Fendhee"		Solo
N/A	N/A	"Raagu Nala Nala"		Solo
N/A	N/A	"Maa"		Solo
N/A	N/A	"Fehi Raiy Hudhun Nashaalaa"		Mohamed Abdul Ghanee
N/A	N/A	"Maathah"		Solo
N/A	Boadhaabas	"Ey Bunedheebalaa"		Ahmed Fath'hee (Fathey)
N/A	Boadhaabas	"Saahibaa"		Solo
N/A	Ekani	"Han'dhaan"		Solo
N/A	Minthi	"Kan'balun"		Solo
N/A	Minthi	"Geveshi Aniyaa"		Solo
N/A	Minthi	"Furaavaru"		Solo
N/A	Fanditha	"Salhi Kokaaleh"		Solo
1997	Alivilun	"Kathuney"		Solo
2002	E'Kamanaa	"Heelaafaa Loabi Dheynveehey"	Ahmed Nashidh (Dharavandhoo)	Solo
2002	Hithukooru	"Aadheys"	Mohamed Abdul Ghanee	Waves Band
2002	Nazaru	"Ekanivi Thanugaa"		Solo
2002	Raasthaa	"Kashikun'buru Biya Jangalee"		Solo
2002	Raasthaa	"Kurimaguge Raasthaa Alikuran"		Ali Rameez, Mukhthar Adam, Hassan Ilham Ibrahim Nifar (Thihthi), Ibrahim Amir
2003	Loabi Loabin	"Loabin Aisbalaa"	Ahmed Saleem	Solo
2004	Yaaraa	"Yaaraa Yaaraa"	Ahmed Nashidh (Dharavandhoo)	Solo
2004	Yaaraa	"Dheefeemey"	Ahmed Nashidh (Dharavandhoo)	Solo
2004	Zamaan	"Loaiybaa Ufaa Nuvaathee"	Boi Ahmed Khaleel	Solo
2005	Fari Goma	"Reyrey Mi Masthee"		Mukhthar Adam
2005	Leyfavethi	"Beehilaa"	Amir Saleem	Solo
2005	Leyfavethi	"Vee Loabin Mihiyy Dhevunee"	Amir Saleem	Solo
2005	Qaumee Dhuvas 1426	"Qaumuge Afraadhun"		MNDF
2005	Yaaraa 2	"Aisbalaa"	Ahmed Nashidh (Dharavandhoo)	Solo
2005	Yaaraa 2	"On The Beach"	Aishath Rishmy	Mohamed Zaidh
2006	Hiyy Roaney	"Mi Libey Furusathekey"	Mohamed Abdul Ghanee	Solo
2006	Hiyy Dheewaanaa 3	"Dheewaanaa Vey"	Shareefa Fakhree	Mohamed Abdul Ghanee
2006	Mihan'dhaanugai...	"Mee Naanaa Ey"	Ahmed Sharumeel	Solo
2006	Yaaraa 3	"Saahibaa Saahibaa"	Ahmed Nashidh (Dharavandhoo)	Solo
2006	Yaaraa 3	"O Loabiviyyaa"	Ahmed Nashidh (Dharavandhoo)	Solo
2006	Yaaraa 3	"Asthaa Mihiyy Beynunveyey"	Ahmed Nashidh (Dharavandhoo)	Abdul Baaree
2007	Salaamey...	"You're My Love"		Mohamed Abdul Ghanee
2007	Single	"Fenkulhi Kulhelan"	Shaaz Saeedh	Solo
2007	Thihan'dhaanugai...	:"Lavvaashi Rahumathugaa Kalaa"	Kaneeru Abdul Raheem	Solo
2008	Beywafaa Viyas	"Ey Hithaa Ey Dhen Thee"		Solo
2008	Hiyy Sihenee	"Ishqu Mee"		Mohamed Abdul Ghanee
2008	Jaadhuvee Nooru	"Aawaaraa Aawaaraa"	Mohamed Abdul Ghanee	Ibrahim Zaid Ali
2008	Jaadhuvee Nooru	"Goalhi Goalhin Sirru Sirrun"	Mohamed Abdul Ghanee	Solo
2008	Jaadhuvee Nooru	"Kohfin Hiyy Mi Loabin Hadhiyaa"	Adam Haleem Adhnan	Solo
2008	Mohamed Nasheedh 2008	"Wathan Edhey Gothah"		Various
2008	Thihan'dhaanugai Remix	"Guraafulhu"	Imaadh Ismail	Solo
2009	Hiyy Rohvaanulaa	"Ey Hithaa Ey Kushakah Veyhey"	Adam Haleem Adhnan	Abdulla Naashif (Thaathi)
2009	Qaumee Dhuvas 1429	"Nidhin Heylaa"		MNDF
2009	Single	"Ilaahee Mibin" (Cover)	Abdul Rasheedh Hussain	Solo
2009	Vaahan'dhaanakun	"Fedhu Unimi Koalhi"		Solo
2009	Vaahan'dhaanakun	"Hunnantha Vee Umurah Mihen"		Solo
2009	Vaahan'dhaanakun	"Vaahan'dhaanakun Rovenee" (Group Version)	Mohamed Amir Ahmed (Fares)	Rafiyath Rameeza, Ibrahim Zaid Ali, Mukhthar Adam Mohamed Abdul Ghanee
2010	Rakis Bon'du	"Mashah"		Solo
2010	Veeraanaa	"Vakivedhiyayas" (Duet Version)	Adam Haleem Adhnan	Ibrahim Zaid Ali
2011	17th SAARC Summit	"Ehbaivanthakan"	Mohamed Abdul GhaneeIsmail Hameedh, Zainab Mariyam Unoosha	Mohamed Abdul Ghanee
2011	Hiyy Dheewaanaa 5	"Ishqu Heyleemaa"		Mohamed Abdul Ghanee
2012	Ehan'dhaanugai 1433	"In'gey"	Ismail Mubarik	Ahmed Ibrahim
2012	Single	"Fenkulhi Kulhelan" (Remix Version)	Shaaz Saeedh	Solo
2012	Single	"Jaadhuvee Moonu"	Mohamed Abdul Ghanee	Solo
2014	Environment Day 2014	"Thimaaveshi"	Zaki	Mohamed Abdul Ghanee
2014	Single	"Hiyanyah Mudi Negun (Dheewaanaavey)"	Shaaz Saeedh	Solo
2015	Minivan 50	"Minivan 50" (Theme Song)	Adam Naseer Ibrahim	Mohamed Abdul Ghanee, Rafiyath Rameeza Hussain Ali, Aishath Maain Rasheed, Ahmed Ibrahim
2017	Single	"Themunas Hevey"	Ismail Mubarik	Solo
2020	Loabi Nulibunas	"Veyey Antharees"		Solo
2021	Udhuhilaa	"Naanaa" (Cover)	Jeymu Dhonkamana	Shafeeqa Abdul Latheef
2021	Udhuhilaa	"Thari"		Solo
2021	Udhuhilaa	"Ufaaveri Khiyaalugaa"		Solo
2021	Udhuhilaa	"Mee Kiyaidhey Naanaa"		Solo
2021	Udhuhilaa	"Udhuhilaa"		Solo
2021	Udhuhilaa	"Al'hamdhulillah"		Solo
2021	Udhuhilaa	"Nidhi Aadhey Nidhi Aadhey"		Solo
2021	Udhuhilaa	"Dhuvahuge Nimun"		Solo

== Accolades ==
Unoosha who is the only singer who has been an official ambassador of an international brand Nescafé and the local ambassador of Maldives leading telecom company Dhiraagu and the branded Eyewear company Eyecare.

Year	Award	Category	Nominated work	Result
2010	Maldives Video Music Awards	Best Female Singer		Won
2010	1st SunFm Awards	Most Entertaining Female Vocalist		Won
2011	1st Maldives Film Awards	Best Female Playback Singer	"Haadha Dhahivethi" - Khalaas	Won
2017	8th Gaumee Film Awards	Best Female Playback Singer	"Forever In Love" - 24 Gadi Iru	Won
