= Maafeh Neiy =

- Official film poster
- Directed by: Ali Seezan
- Written by: Sharee
- Produced by: Ali Seezan
- Starring: Niuma Mohamed; Ali Seezan; Koyya Hassan Manik
- Cinematography: Ibrahim Wisan
- Edited by: Ali Seezan
- Music by: Ayyuman Shareef
- Production company: CXanal Movies
- Release date: March 9, 2010
- Country: Maldives
- Language: Dhivehi

Maafeh Neii is a 2010 family drama film directed and produced by Ali Seezan. Produced under CXanal Movies, the film stars Seezan, Niuma Mohamed and Koyya Hassan Manik in pivotal roles. The film was released on 9 March 2010.

The film focuses on three generations of one family. It highlights many social issues, such as the human rights abuses, forced marriages and domestic violence. The entire film is shot at B. Kamadhoo. The font design used in the posters of film caused confused the audience with a title Maadeh Neiy which has no native meaning. A similar naming issue ensued in a previous venture of director in Karuna Vee Beyvafa (2009).

== Cast ==
- Niuma Mohamed as Seema
- Ali Seezan as Nawal
- Koyya Hassan Manik as Naseer
- Roanu Hassan Manik as Mohamed Fulhu
- Arifa Ibrahim as Abidha
- Lufshan Shakeeb as Hamza
- Nashidha Mohamed as Fazaa
- Aminath Ameela as Rizna
- Hamdhan Farooq as Mafaaz

== Release and response ==
The film was criticised for its melodrama. A reviewer from Haveeru Daily praised the cinematography and inclusion of several social issues in the film simultaneously dissatisfied with its "ornate" dialogues and "unrealistic" makeup in special effects. Similar to the mixed reviews from critics, the film did average business at box office.

== Soundtrack ==
The soundtrack album of the film was composed by Ibrahim Zaid Ali and Ayyuman Shareef while the lyrics were penned by Mohamed Abdul Ghanee and Ismail Mubarik.

Track listing
No.	Title	Lyrics	Music	Singer(s)	Length
1.	"Antharees"	Mohamed Abdul Ghanee	Ibrahim Zaid Ali	Ibrahim Zaid Ali, Maya Nasih
2.	"Thihen Ladhun Heeleema"	Ismail Mubarik	Ibrahim Zaid Ali	Ibrahim Zaid Ali
3.	"Hanhaara"	Mohamed Abdul Ghanee	Ibrahim Zaid Ali	Ibrahim Zaid Ali, Rafiyath Rameeza
4.	"Hiyfuri Loameri"	Mohamed Abdul Ghanee	Ayyuman Shareef	Umar Zahir, Shifa Thaufeeq
5.	"Soora"	Mohamed Abdul Ghanee	Ibrahim Zaid Ali	Mohamed Abdul Ghanee, Maya Nasih
6.	"Loadhefurigen"	Mohamed Abdul Ghanee		Moonisa Khaleel
7.	"Nidhaalaashey"	Mohamed Abdul Ghanee	Ayyuman Shareef	Shifa Thaufeeq

== Accolades ==
Award	Category	Recipients	Result	Ref.
2nd Maldives Film Awards	Best Film	Maafeh Neiy	Nominated	
2nd Maldives Film Awards	Best Director	Ali Seezan	Nominated	
2nd Maldives Film Awards	Best Actress	Niuma Mohamed	Nominated	
2nd Maldives Film Awards	Best Editing	Ali Seezan	Nominated	
