= Dharinnahtakai =

2004 film directed by Ahmed Nimal

- Official film poster
- Directed by: Ahmed Nimal
- Written by: Fathimath Rameeza
- Screenplay by: Ahmed Nimal
- Produced by: Ahmed Saleem
- Starring: Ali Seezan; Niuma Mohamed; Ahmed Asim; Sheereen Abdul Wahid
- Cinematography: Mohamed Manik; Ahmed Amir
- Edited by: Ahmed Shah
- Music by: Mohamed Ikram; Ahmed Rameez; Score: Imad Ismail
- Production company: Artwaves
- Release date: March 25, 2004
- Country: Maldives
- Language: Dhivehi

Dharinnahtakai is a 2004 Maldivian romantic drama film directed by Ahmed Nimal. Produced by Ahmed Saleem under Artwaves, the film stars Ali Seezan, Niuma Mohamed, Ahmed Asim and Sheereen Abdul Wahid in pivotal roles.

== Premise ==
Moonisa (Niuma Mohamed) and Shahid (Ali Seezan) live a happy life with their daughter Nadhu until Shahid's childhood friend, Junaid (Ahmed Asim) returns from abroad who decides to take revenge on Moonisa for rebuffing his relationship proposal. Moonisa, who is pregnant to their second child visits her mother-in-law while Shahid stays due to his busy work schedule. Junaid's introduces Shahid to his friend Sabeeha (Sheereen Abdul Wahid) and convinces Shahid to hire her as his personal secretary in his factory. Their plan works successfully when Shahid decides to marry Sabeeha and she makes it her life mission to make Moonisa's life miserable.

== Cast ==
- Ali Seezan as Shahid
- Niuma Mohamed as Moonisa
- Ahmed Asim as Junaid
- Sheereen Abdul Wahid as Sabeeha
- Ali Shameel as Muneez
- Fauziyya Hassan as Raheema
- Neena Saleem as Athifa
- Mariyam Haleem as Hawwa
- Aishath Shaiha as Nadhu

== Soundtrack ==
Track listing
No.	Title	Lyrics	Music	Singer(s)	Length
1.	"Insaaneke Mee Dhuniyeyga"	Easa Shareef	Imad Ismail	Rafiyath Rameeza
2.	"Athugaa Hifaadhin"	Ahmed Nashid	Imad Ismail	Ibrahim Rameez, Rafiyath Rameeza
3.	"Dhaan Hingaa"	Ahmed Nashid	Mohamed Ikram	Ibrahim Rameez, Shifa Thaufeeq
4.	"Insaaneke Mee Dhuniyeyga" (Male version)	Easa Shareef	Imad Ismail	Ibrahim Rameez

== Accolades ==
Year	Award	Category	Recipients	Result	Ref(s)
2007	4th Gaumee Film Awards	Best Actor	Ali Seezan	Nominated	
2007	4th Gaumee Film Awards	Best Actress	Niuma Mohamed	Nominated	
2007	4th Gaumee Film Awards	Best Supporting Actor	Ahmed Asim	Nominated	
2007	4th Gaumee Film Awards	Best Supporting Actress	Sheereen Abdul Wahid	Nominated	
2007	4th Gaumee Film Awards	Best Original Song	Mohamed Ikram – "Dhaan Hingaa"	Won	
