= Dhirumeh Nethas =

Maldivian television mini-series

- Genre: Drama
- Written by: Hassan Zareer
- Screenplay by: Hassan Zareer
- Directed by: Ahmed Nimal
- Starring: Lufshan Shakeeb; Nashidha Mohamed; Niuma Mohamed
- Music by: Ibrahim Nifar
- No. of seasons: 1
- No. of episodes: 5

Production
- Producer: Ahmed Shakeeb
- Cinematography: Ibrahim Moosa
- Editors: Hussain Munawwar; Ahmed Ziya
- Running time: 23–25 minutes
- Production company: Movie Maldives

Original release
- Release: 22 July – 23 August 2012

Dhirumeh Nethas is a Maldivian television mini-series developed for Television Maldives by Ahmed Nimal. Produced by Ahmed Shakeeb under Movie Maldives studio, the series stars Lufshan Shakeeb, Nashidha Mohamed and Niuma Mohamed in pivotal roles. The series was aired on 22 July 2012 on the occasion of 1433 Ramadan.

== Cast ==
- Lufshan Shakeeb as Nafiu
- Nashidha Mohamed as Azma
- Ahmed Nimal as Azma's father
- Ibrahim Jihad as Irufan
- Ali Fizam as Adil
- Nadhiya Hassan as Azma's friend
- Niuma Mohamed as Hudha
- Aminath Ameela as Noora

== Episodes ==
No. overall	No. in season	Title	Directed by	Original release date
1	1	"Episode 1"	Ahmed Nimal	July 22, 2012
Nafiu (Lufshan Shakeeb), a surveyor working on the land reclamation project of an island, falls in love with a young woman, Azma (Nashidha Mohamed) who is seemingly possessed by a ghost. When Nafiu inquired about her, his friend Adil (Ali Fizam) advises him to stay away from her.
2	2	"Episode 2"	Ahmed Nimal	August 9, 2012
Nafiu's ex-girlfriend, Hudha (Niuma Mohamed) requests him to get back together with her, which he declines. A furious gang member, Irufan (Ibrahim Jihad) warns Nafiu to leave the thoughts of Azma which ultimately creates a bond between them.
3	3	"Episode 3"	Ahmed Nimal	August 16, 2012
4	4	"Episode 4"	Ahmed Nimal	August 20, 2012
5	5	"Episode 5"	Ahmed Nimal	August 23, 2012

== Soundtrack ==
Track listing
No.	Title	Singer(s)	Length
1.	"Dhirumeh Nethas"	Andhala Haleem
