= Kalaage Handhaanuga =

2009 film directed by Ahmed Asim

Kalaage Handhaanugaa
- Official film poster
- Directed by: Ahmed Asim
- Written by: Fairooz
- Screenplay by: Fairooz
- Produced by: Mohamed Shamaail
- Starring: Ahmed Asim; Maisha
- Cinematography: Ali Mueen
- Edited by: Ahmed Asim
- Music by: Ayyuman Shareef
- Production company: Movie People
- Release date: 2009
- Running time: 56 minutes
- Country: Maldives
- Language: Dhivehi

Kalaage Handhaanuga is a 2009 Maldivian romantic film directed by Ahmed Asim. Produced by Mohamed Shamaail under Movie People, the film stars Asim and Maisha in pivotal roles. The entire film was shot in K. Thulusdhoo.

== Premise ==
A school teacher, Shasha (Maisha) starts a romantic relationship with Zanish who works at a photo-copy shop. A strong-hearted local who is obsessed over her beauty is heartbroken when he discovers their relationship and tries brainstorming her by talking ill about Zanish. Everything was going smooth between the couple until they decide to marry. A pre-marriage diagnosis reveals the couple as two carriers of thalassemia trait. Despite all the barriers, Zanish and Shasha decide to marry which infuriates her father.

== Cast ==
- Ahmed Asim as Zanish
- Maisha as Shasha
- Ajunaz Ali as Ammadey
- Nashidha Mohamed as Leena

== Soundtrack ==
Track listing
No.	Title	Singer(s)	Length
1.	"Reethi Handhaan"	Ahmed Amir
