= Fenu Paree =

2007 film directed by Ali Seezan

- Official film poster
- Directed by: Ali Seezan
- Written by: Ali Seezan
- Screenplay by: Ali Seezan
- Produced by: Ali Seezan
- Starring: Lufshan Shakeeb; Mariyam Siyadha; Mariyam Afeefa; Muslima Abdulla
- Cinematography: Ilu
- Edited by: Ali Seezan; Ali Shanaz
- Music by: Ibrahim Nifar
- Production company: C-Xanal Movies
- Release date: 2007
- Country: Maldives
- Language: Dhivehi

Fenu Paree is a 2007 Maldivian teen fantasy romantic comedy short-film, written, produced and directed by Ali Seezan. The film stars Lufshan Shakeeb, Mariyam Siyadha, Mariyam Afeefa and Muslima Abdulla in pivotal roles. The film was an unofficial remake of American teen fantasy film Aquamarine (2006) directed by Elizabeth Allen, loosely based on the 2001 young adult novel of the same name by Alice Hoffman.

== Premise ==
Suzanna (Mariyam Afeefa) spends her last few days in her home island with her best friend, Shau (Aishath Muslima) before Suzanna relocates to Male'. One day, when Suzanna was enjoying sometime at the beach, she sees something strange with a tail in the sea. The girls go back and explore the following day, and find a mermaid named Fenu Paree (Aishath Siyadha) who becomes friend with the girls instantly.

Fenu Paree reveals her mission to find true love in order to get away from an arranged marriage and requests the girl to help her accomplish it, in return she will grant a wish from the girls. Since Suzanna was not aware of how love works in the human world, she is immediately rejected by Huzam (Lufshan Shakeeb) whom everyone including the girls have a crush on. The friends work on several strategies to win Huzam's love for Fenu Paree.

== Cast ==
- Lufshan Shakeeb as Huzam
- Mariyam Siyadha as Fenu Paree
- Mariyam Afeefa as Suzanna
- Muslima Abdulla as Shau
- Nashidha Mohamed as Neelam
- Ali Seezan as Fenu Paree's father (Special appearance)
- Hishama as Suzanna's mother

== Soundtrack ==
Track listing
No.	Title	Singer(s)	Length
1.	"Fari Paree Fenilumun"	Ibrahim Zaid Ali	4:13
2.	"Fenu Paree Fenilumun"	Mohamed Abdul Ghanee	4:38

== Accolades ==
Year	Award	Category	Recipients	Result	Ref(s)
2008	2nd Miadhu Crystal Award	Best Debut Actress	Muslima Abdulla	Won	
