= Handi Ganduvaru Dhonkamana =

- Directed by: Ali Seezan
- Written by: Ali Seezan
- Screenplay by: Ali Seezan
- Produced by: Ali Seezan
- Starring: Ali Seezan; Niuma Mohamed; Lufshan Shakeeb
- Edited by: Shanaaz
- Music by: Abdulla
- Production company: Redline Movies
- Release date: 2006
- Running time: 79 minutes
- Country: Maldives
- Language: Dhivehi

Handi Ganduvaru Dhonkamana (transl. Fair Lady of the Ghost Palace) is a 2006 Maldivian comedy short-film written, produced and directed by Ali Seezan. The film stars Ali Seezan, Niuma Mohamed and Lufshan Shakeeb in pivotal roles. A sequel of the film titled Handi Ganduvaru Dhonkamana 2½ was released in 2007.

== Premise ==
Kamana (Niuma Mohamed), an explanatory young woman from a magical planet lands on Earth hoping to understand the human behavior and find a man whom she loves. Director (Ibrahim Wisan) and actor, Zaid Khan (Lufshan Shakeeb) hunts for a newcomer to star in their next venture, Handi Ganduvaru Dhonkamana. Despite her father's objection, Kamana auditions for the role of Kamana, the wife of Dhon Mohamed, played by Zaid. Kamana, along with her friend, Snow White (Khadheeja Ibrahim Didi) hatch a plan to teach a lesson to the proud and arrogant Zaid.

== Cast ==
- Ali Seezan
- Niuma Mohamed as Kamana
- Lufshan Shakeeb as Zaid Khan
- Ibrahim Wisan as Spielberg
- Khadheeja Ibrahim Didi as Snow White
- Ahmed Asim as Mahesh
- Vikash
- Reeko Moosa Manik (special appearance)

== Soundtrack ==
Track listing
No.	Title	Singer(s)	Length
1.	"Kamanaa Ey Nikan Bunaashey"	Hassan Ilham
