= Vigani =

- Directed by: Ali Seezan
- Written by: Amir Saleem
- Screenplay by: Amir Saleem
- Produced by: Ali Seezan
- Starring: Ali Seezan; Lufshan Shakeeb; Mariyam Afeefa
- Cinematography: Hussain
- Edited by: Ali Seezan
- Music by: Abdullah
- Production company: C-xanal Movies
- Release date: 2007
- Running time: 52 minutes (Part 1); 61 minutes (Part 2)
- Country: Maldives
- Language: Dhivehi

Vigani is a 2007 two-part Maldivian horror short-film directed by Ali Seezan. Produced by Seezan under C-xanal Movies, the film stars Seezan, Lufshan Shakeeb and Mariyam Afeefa in pivotal roles.

== Premise ==
=== Part 1: Vigani ===
Zila, reluctantly joins his friends, Imran and Nizu in sailing to the sandbank, hoping to catch some birds nesting on it. As the sun was ready to set and realizing the folklore and myth surrounding the very sandbank, the three friends start their journey back to their island. Halfway to their destination, the engine of the dinghy stops abruptly and Nizu falls sick. Stranded at sea, Nizu dies within few minutes while coughing in the bad weather. Zila and Imran bring the corpse of Nizu to the nearby uninhabited island. Soon after, they star hallucinating and experience paranormal activities in the island.

=== Part 2: Kandu Vigani ===
Following the events from Part 1, Zila (Ali Seezan), his friend, Imran (Lufshan Shakeeb) and the latter's girlfriend, Nizu (Mariyam Afeefa) sail to a nearby uninhabited island for an overnight. The friends start pranking each other until Zila sees a dead body in the sea. Panicked, they start pointing finger towards each other while the darkness surrounds them. The mummified body drifts towards the seashore and the friends search for a way to leave the island. In the process, Zila and Imran engages in a fight while Nizu vanishes into thin air. The part ends when Imran and Nizu wakes Zila from a dream (all prior events are believed to be Zila's dream sequences) to starts their journey to the nearby sandbank.

== Cast ==
- Ali Seezan as Zila
- Lufshan Shakeeb as Imran
- Mariyam Afeefa as Nizu

== Soundtrack ==
Track listing
No.	Title	Singer(s)	Length
1.	"Dhan Vumun Kalhu Andhirikan"	Mukhthar Adam	4:42

== Accolades ==
Year	Award	Category	Recipients	Result	Ref(s)
2008	2nd Miadhu Crystal Award	Best Actress	Mariyam Afeefa for Kandu Vigani	Won	
2008	2nd Miadhu Crystal Award	Best Make-up	Mariyam Afeefa for Kandu Vigani	Won	
