= Wathan (film) =

- Official film poster
- Directed by: Ali Seezan
- Written by: Ali Seezan
- Screenplay by: Ali Seezan
- Produced by: Ali Seezan
- Starring: Ali Seezan; Lufshan Shakeeb; Mariyam Siyadha
- Cinematography: Hussain Munawwar
- Edited by: Ali Seezan
- Music by: Ibrahim Nifar
- Production company: Cxanal Movies
- Release date: September 15, 2011
- Country: Maldives
- Language: Dhivehi

Wathan is a 2011 Maldivian war action comedy film written, edited, produced and directed by Ali Seezan. Produced under Cxanal Movies, the film stars Ali Seezan, Lufshan Shakeeb and Mariyam Siyadha in pivotal roles. The film was released on 15 September 2011.

== Cast ==
- Ali Seezan as Mr. Bond
- Lufshan Shakeeb as Capt. Niya
- Mariyam Siyadha as Siyadha; CID Agent
- Fiza as Aishath
- Ahmed Ziya as Ziya
- Shan as Shan
- Munaaz as Col. Abdulla Munaz
- Nadhiya Hassan as news presenter (Special appearance)
- Aishath Rishmy as Aishath Rishmy (Special appearance)
- Mariyam Azza in the item number "Dhurun Balaashey" (Special appearance)

== Release and response ==
The film was released on 15 September 2011. Upon release the film received negative response from critics. Haveeru Daily felt the film "deceived" the audience in the name of action thriller; "I highly doubt if the project team was even sure of what kind of movie they were planning to make. It is a total mess between a serious action movie and scoop comedy". The film was further criticized for remaking several shots from Jim Abrahams's parody film, Hot Shots! Part Deux (1993).
