= Nudhaashe Dhookohfaa Loabivaa =

2007 film directed by Mohamed Shamaail

- Official film poster
- Directed by: Mohamed Shamaail
- Produced by: Aishath Shadhin Shamaail
- Starring: Mariyam Afeefa; Lufshan Shakeeb
- Cinematography: Ibrahim Wisan
- Edited by: Mohamed Shamaail
- Music by: Ibrahim Nifar
- Production company: Stepin Productions
- Release date: July 10, 2007
- Running time: 106 minutes
- Country: Maldives
- Language: Dhivehi

Nudhaashe Dhookohfaa Loabivaa is a 2007 Maldivian short-film directed by Mohamed Shamaail. Produced by Aishath Shadhin Shamaail under Stepin Productions, the film stars Mariyam Afeefa and Lufshan Shakeeb in pivotal roles.

== Premise ==
Shabana (Mariyam Afeefa) and Hafiz (Lufshan Shakeeb) are college mates whose relationship is misunderstood by the former's aunt, Rasheedha (Aminath Shareef) who warns Hafiz to stay away from Shabana. Hafiz determines to challenge Rasheedha and wins Shabana's love where Rasheedha negotiates to arrange Shabana's marriage with a wealthy businessman, Thuhthu (Hamid Ali). Rasheedha fakes an illness and emotionally blackmails Shabana into marrying Thuhthu, which she rejects on the spot. However things take an unexpected turn when Shabana receives the news of Hafiz's untimely death in a road accident.

== Cast ==
- Mariyam Afeefa as Shabana
- Lufshan Shakeeb as Hafiz
- Hamid Ali as Thuhthu
- Mohamed Afrah as Ali
- Aminath Shareef as Rasheedha
- Ahmed Ziya as Hussain

== Soundtrack ==
Track listing
| No. | Title | Lyrics | Music | Singer(s) | Length |
|---|---|---|---|---|---|
| 1. | "Nudhaashe Dhookohfaa Loabivaa" | Shifa Thaufeeq | Ayyuman Shareef | Shifa Thaufeeq |
