= Khalaas =

- Official film poster
- Directed by: Ahmed Nimal
- Written by: Amir Saleem
- Screenplay by: Amir Saleem
- Produced by: Ali Seezan
- Starring: Ali Seezan; Mariyam Afeefa; Nadhiya Hassan
- Cinematography: Hussain
- Edited by: Ali Seezan
- Music by: Abdulla Moosa
- Production company: C-Xanal Movies
- Release date: August 1, 2008
- Country: Maldives
- Language: Dhivehi

Khalaas is a 2008 Maldivian erotic horror thriller film directed by Ahmed Nimal. Produced by Ali Seezan under C-Xanal Movies, the film stars Ali Seezan, Mariyam Afeefa and Nadhiya Hassan in pivotal roles.

== Plot ==
Faya (Ali Seezan) and Sara (Mariyam Afeefa), a newly married couple relocate themselves to Sri Lanka and they experience strange horrific incidences within the house they live in. Faya bumps into a girl Reena (Nadhiya Hassan) who intentionally drops her wallet, inviting him to her house where they share intimacy. He stays all night with her while a scared Sara is encountered with a supernatural force. She wakes up the next morning while being admitted in the hospital and Faya promises her never to leave her side again.

Faya hesitantly continues meeting Reena. Sara discovers a small photograph of Reena in the pocket of one of his shirts and conclude that they are having an affair. After a series of events, it was revealed that Reena actually has committed suicide in a locked room of the very same house Faya resides, years back when her family dejects her relationship with her impoverished boyfriend, a lookalike of Faya.

== Cast ==
- Ali Seezan as Faya
- Mariyam Afeefa as Sara
- Nadhiya Hassan as Reena
- Ahmed Nimal as Ismail

== Soundtrack ==
Track listing
No.	Title	Lyrics	Singer(s)	Length
1.	"Haadha Dhahivethi Belumekey"	Amir Saleem	Ali Seezan, Mariyam Unoosha	5:40
2.	"Hiyy Gaimey"	Amir Saleem	Mumthaz Moosa, Aishath Inaya	4:48

== Accolades ==
Year	Award	Category	Recipients	Result	Ref.
2011	1st Maldives Film Awards	Best Female Playback Singer	Mariyam Unoosha for "Haadha Dhahivethi Belumekey"	Won	
2011	1st Maldives Film Awards	Best Choreography	Ali Seezan for "Haadha Dhahivethi Belumekey"	Won	
