= Dhin Veynuge Hithaamaigaa =

- Official film poster
- Directed by: Ali Shifau
- Written by: Mohamed Ali; Ali Shifau
- Screenplay by: Ali Shifau
- Produced by: Mohamed Ali
- Starring: Yoosuf Shafeeu; Niuma Mohamed; Ali Seezan; Mohamed Manik
- Cinematography: Ali Shifau
- Edited by: Ali Shifau
- Music by: Ayyuman Shareef
- Production company: Dark Rain Entertainment
- Release date: April 5, 2010
- Country: Maldives
- Language: Dhivehi

Dhin Veynuge Hithaamaigaa is a 2010 Maldivian family drama film written and directed by Ali Shifau. Produced by Mohamed Ali under Dark Rain Entertainment, the film stars Yoosuf Shafeeu, Niuma Mohamed, Ali Seezan, Mohamed Manik and Ravee Farooq in pivotal roles. The film was released on 5 April 2010.

== Plot ==
Nahees (Mohamed Manik), a doctor, was notified of Ainth's (Niuma Mohamed) maternal death due to internal bleeding while the baby was in good condition. After her dismissal, he started spending more time with his daughter Nishath (Fathimath Aflaz Faisal) and tried to move on. Nashid (Yoosuf Shafeeu) returned from Malaysia, accidentally shuffled his luggage at Airport with Nisha Niuma Mohamed, a model, who was leaving to Addu for a photoshoot with Ravee Farooq, a photographer.

Fairooz (Ali Seezan) an impudent manager of a Motorcycle distributing company, distressed with the company's drop in sales, he discussed the issue with the company's sale team. Ishan (Mohamed Faisal), a colleague, opined to strengthen their marketing strategy and create fresh and innovative advertisements. Niuma was selected as the exclusive model for the company and was invited to a gathering to introduce a new product of the company. During the party, Nashid was introduced as the second shareholder of the company. In his speech, Nashid thanked Fairooz for upholding the business which was started by Nashid's father. Later, Nisha apologised to Nashid for making fun of him and acting rude. The duo befriends and to Nisha's surprise, Nashid proposed her to marry him. Nashid and Nisha decided to marry in a week despite his aunt's disapproval. It was revealed that Fairooz ploys to own the company, though his mother is entitled to only ten percent of the company's ownership by will, the rest passed on to Nashid.

After marriage, Nashid terminated the contract of Nisha being the exclusive model of the company and informed Fairooz not to use any of her advertisements previously prepared for marketing. Fairooz's mother started mistreating Nisha and oppressing her for being for being an outsider. Fairooz offered a serial killer (Ahmed Ziya) to kill Nashid. In a failed attempt, it was revealed that Nashid was paralysed below waist and suffers male infertility. Feeding her of guilt with all unfortunates, Nashid sees Nisha with Jana and misinterpreted it as an affair. Accusing her of taking advantages of his physical weakness, Nashid divorces her and throws her out of the house.

With the help of company's lawyer, Manik (Roanu Hassan Manik), Fairooz started to snatch the ownership of company into his hands. Ziya blackmails Fairooz to pay the rest of money, when he defied the payment for not settling the contract with all its terms. Fairooz paid him fully and warned him not to meet ever again. Sympathizing about Nashid and his situation, Fairooz's mother tried talking Fairooz out of his plan. However, deceived with other documents, Nashid signed the company's ownership transfer documents unknowingly. Fairooz's mother gets hold of the documents and hid it.

Nisha was offered the job of babysitting Nishath since Nahees decided to join the clinic inaugurated by his friend Faiz. Nahees was surprised to see Nisha since she looked identical to his deceased wife Ainth. Nishath started behaving mischievously with Nisha since she does not want any one in her house beside her mother. They later started to bond and Nahees started to grow feelings towards her. As a patient, Nashid was consulted with Nahees and he recommended to start medication immediately. He informed that Nahees's incapability to walk was temporary but maybe permanent if an operation is delayed. The operation went smoothly and he was able to walk again. One night, Nahees proposed her but Nisha revealed to him that she had been earlier married to Nashid. Nisha was visited by Nashid much to her surprise, and she was astound to see he can walk. Nashid revealed that he saw his aunt tormenting her and he never doubted her loyalty, but he was forced to divorce her for her good.

On his way to home, he was encountered with Ziya and out of fear, he spilled the truth; Fairooz paid him to kill Nashid. Questioned about his envy, Fairooz revealed that he avenges the death of his father. Fairooz's father was fired from the company and was forbidden to meet him till he dies. His mother disclosed that her husband abused her till he dies, and Nashid's father was the one who helped them through hardship. Fairooz asked forgiveness from Nashid and he agreed. Nahees decided to move to Malaysia with his daughter. But before he leaves, he requested Nahees and Nashid to look after his daughter.

== Cast ==
- Yoosuf Shafeeu as Nashid
- Niuma Mohamed as Nisha/Ainth
- Ali Seezan as Fairooz
- Mohamed Manik as Nahees
- Ravee Farooq as Jana
- Fauziyya Hassan as Fairooz's mother
- Fathimath Aflaz Faisal as Nishath
- Ahmed Ziya
- Mohamed Faisal as Ishan
- Nashidha Mohamed as Shaanee
- Mohamed Faisal as Faiz
- Ahmed Nimal (Special appearance)
- Roanu Hassan Manik as Manik (Special appearance)

Special appearances during the song "Annaashey Hinthun Velamaa" (in order of appearance)

- Ahmed Fizam
- Abdulla Muaz
- Nadhiya Hassan
- Mariyam Shakeela
- Aminath Shareef
- Ali Farooq
- Mariyam Haleem
- Sheela Najeeb
- Amjad Ibrahim
- Hassan Afeef
- Ibrahim Zaid Ali
- Ahmed Shabeen
- Hamdhan Farooq
- Roanu Hassan Manik
- Chilhiya Moosa Manik
- Mohamed Abdulla
- Ibrahim Wisan
- Jadhulla Ismail
- Amira Ismail
- Mariyam Afeefa
- Mohamed Shavin
- Ibrahim Jihad
- Mohamed Rasheed
- Mohamed Abdul Ghanee
- Mariyam Ashfa
- Moosa Zakariyya
- Ahmed Ghiyas
- Ahmed Shah Ali
- Rafiyath Rameeza
- Hamdhoon Farooq

== Release and response ==
The film received positive response from critics; Shifaus' direction and using a "unique approach in presenting the concept to the romance-starved Maldivian audience". The film was believed to be a "huge improvement" over the recent Maldivian films. Being able to screen fifteen housefull shows of the film, it was declared that Dhin Veynuge Hithaamaigaa is a commercial success.

== Soundtrack ==
Track listing
No.	Title	Lyrics	Music	Singer(s)	Length
1.	"Ey Zamaana"	Yoosuf Mohamed Fulhu	Hussain Sobah	Rafiyath Rameeza	4:46
2.	"Dhin Veynuge Hithaamaiga" (Original composition by Abdul Hannan Moosa Didi)	Abdul Hannan Moosa Didi	Hussain Sobah	Mumthaz Moosa	4:20
3.	"Kalaa Beevumun"	Amir Saleem	Hussain Sobah	Hassan Ilham	4:07
4.	"Hithu Vindhaa"	Mohamed Abdul Ghanee	Ibrahim Zaid Ali	Mumthaz Moosa	3:35
5.	"Annaashey Hinithun Velamaa"	Mohamed Abdul Ghanee	Ibrahim Zaid Ali	Mohamed Abdul Ghanee, Ibrahim Zaid Ali, Rafiyath Rameeza, Ahmed Shabeen, Mariyam Ashfa, Aminath Shaufa Saeed	4:58
6.	"Dhin Veynuge Hithaamaiga (Remix)" (Original composition by Abdul Hannan Moosa Didi)	Abdul Hannan Moosa Didi	Hussain Sobah	Mumthaz Moosa	5:40
7.	"Dhin Veynuge Hithaamaiga (Theme)" (Original composition by Abdul Hannan Moosa Didi)	Abdul Hannan Moosa Didi	Ibrahim Zaid Ali	Ibrahim Zaid Ali	00:45
8.	"Dhoadhi Ran"	Mohamed Abdul Ghanee	Ibrahim Zaid Ali	Mumthaz Moosa, Rafiyath Rameeza	3:43
9.	"Saahiba"	Hussain Sobah	Ibrahim Zaid Ali	Abdul Baaree, Rafiyath Rameeza	5:46

== Accolades ==
Award	Category	Recipients	Result	Ref.
2nd Maldives Film Awards	Best Supporting Actor	Ali Seezan	Won	
2nd Maldives Film Awards	Best Lyrics	Abdul Hannan Moosa Didi for "Dhin Veynuge Hithaamaigaa"	Won	
2nd Maldives Film Awards	Best Male Playback Singer	Hassan Ilham for "Kalaa Beevumun"	Won	
2nd Maldives Film Awards	Best Original Song	"Kalaa Beevvumun"	Won	
2nd Maldives Film Awards	Best Visual Effect	Ahmed Sinan	Won	
6th Gaumee Film Awards	Best Supporting Actor	Ali Seezan	Nominated	
6th Gaumee Film Awards	Best Lyricist	Mohamed Abdul Ghanee for "Dhoadhi Ran"	Nominated	
6th Gaumee Film Awards	Best Lyricist	Abdul Hannan Moosa Didi for "Dhin Veynuge Hithaamaigaa"	Nominated	
6th Gaumee Film Awards	Best Cinematography	Ali Shifau	Nominated	
6th Gaumee Film Awards	Best Art Direction	Ali Shifau, Mohamed Ali	Nominated	
6th Gaumee Film Awards	Best Makeup	Mohamed Manik	Nominated	
