= Thiya Loabeegai Abadhahme Vaanamey =

- Genre: Romantic drama
- Written by: Amir Saleem
- Directed by: Mohamed Manik
- Starring: Mohamed Manik; Sheela Najeeb; Nadhiya Hassan
- No. of seasons: 1
- No. of episodes: 4

Production
- Producer: Little Star Investment
- Cinematography: Ali Rasheed
- Running time: 23–25 minutes

Original release
- Network: Television Maldives
- Release: August 13, 2010 – 3 September 2010

Thiya Loabeegai Abadhahme Vaanamey is a Maldivian romantic drama television mini-series developed for Television Maldives by Mohamed Manik. The series stars Mohamed Manik, Sheela Najeeb and Nadhiya Hassan in pivotal roles. The series was aired on 13 August 2010 on the occasion of 1431 Ramadan.

== Premise ==
Nadheem (Mohamed Manik) and Shaina (Sheela Najeeb) are a happily married couple blessed with an adorable daughter, Mishka. Nadheem meets a seductive client, Sama (Nadhiya Hassan), who openly confesses her feelings towards Nadheem . He expresses similar sentiments though hesitant due to his marital status. Complications arise between Nadheem and Shaina when Sama reveals that she is having an affair with Nadheem.

== Cast ==
- Mohamed Manik as Nadheem
- Sheela Najeeb as Shaina
- Nadhiya Hassan as Sama
- Mahee Mohamed Manik as Mishka
- Furugan as Nadheem's colleague

== Soundtrack ==
Track listing
No.	Title	Singer(s)	Length
1.	"Thiya Loabeegai Abadhahme Vaanamey"	Shifa Thaufeeq
