= Nashidha Mohamed =

Maldivian actress (born 1982)

- Born: 2 January 1982 (age 44); Kulhudhuffushi, Maldives
- Occupation: Actress
- Years active: 2004–present

Nashidha Mohamed (born 2 January 1982) is a Maldivian actress who has established a career in the Maldivian film industry. She made her film debut in a supporting role in Ahmed Nimal's 2004 social drama Hama Himeyn. That same year, she had several more supporting roles, including Abdul Faththaah's horror film Eynaa and Mohamed Abdulla's comedy series Dhanmaanu. She later gained recognition for portraying negative roles in the television series Kalaage Haqqugaa (2005) and Baiveriyaa (2005), as well as in multiple short films, including the Dheke Dhekeves series, Neha, Fenu Paree, and Fahu Sofha.

Following the release of Maafeh Neiy in 2010, Mohamed became more active in the industry, starring in family dramas such as Dhin Veynuge Hithaamaigaa (2010) and Hithey Dheymee (2011), as well as in thrillers such as Loodhifa (2011) and Zaharu (2011). She also collaborated with Fathimath Nahula for the first Maldivian web series, Huvaa. Other web series appearances include roles in Huvaa Kohfa Bunan, Hatharu Manzaru, and Biruveri Vaahaka.

== Career ==
Mohamed was first noticed by the owner of the production studio Corona Arts while he was attending an event held in Kulhudhuffushi, where she was performing onstage. Impressed with her appearance and dancing skills, he offered her a starring role in a video single titled "Loabeege Khiyaal", alongside Ahmed Asim. She made her film debut in Ahmed Nimal's social drama Hama Himeyn.

Her next appearance was in Abdul Faththaah's horror film Eynaa (2004), alongside Sheela Najeeb, Mohamed Manik, Ahmed Shah, Khadheeja Ibrahim Didi, and Ibrahim Jihad. The film garnered critical acclaim, especially for its technical team, and was a commercial success. She then stepped into Fathimath Nahula's critically and commercially successful romantic drama television series Kalaage Haqqugaa to portray the role of Zeena. In April 2006, Ahmed Nimal's revenge thriller film Hiyani was released, featuring Mohamed in a small role.

Mohamed's first release of 2010 was Ali Seezan's family drama Maafeh Neiy, alongside Ali Seezan and Niuma Mohamed. The film highlights many Maldivian social issues, including human rights abuses, forced marriage, and domestic violence. The film received mixed reviews from critics, the majority of whom dismissed its melodrama; it was a moderate success at the box office. Mohamed next appeared in Ali Shifau's family drama Dhin Veynuge Hithaamaigaa, once more alongside the Maldives' top female star Niuma Mohamed. The film and her performance received positive reviews from critics and was believed to be a "huge improvement" over recent Maldivian films; it proved to be another commercial success. The actress next starred opposite Sheela Najeeb, Mohamed Manik, and Yoosuf Shafeeu in Ahmed Nimal's horror film Zalzalaa En'buri Aun (2010), a spin-off of Aslam Rasheed's classic horror film Zalzalaa (2000). The film revolves around a mariage blanc, a man's murder by his wife, and the avenging of his death. The film received mixed responses from critics and did moderately well at the box office.

The following year, Mohamed played a small role in the Moomin Fuad-directed crime tragedy drama Loodhifa. Featuring an ensemble cast, the film deals with current social issues in Maldivian society told from the different perspective of each character. Made on a budget of MVR 600,000, the film was declared a commercial failure, though it received wide critical acclaim, praising the performance of the cast and the film's "realism" in its language, characters, and their attitudes. Mohamed next appeared in Ali Shifau's psychological romance thriller Zaharu alongside Ali Seezan, Niuma Mohamed, and Sheela Najeeb. The film centres around a married man who has a brief affair with a woman who becomes obsessed with him; it was inspired by the Adrian Lyne-directed American psychological erotic thriller Fatal Attraction (1987). Upon release, it received mixed reviews from critics and was declared a flop at the box office. The same year, the actress collaborated with Amjad Ibrahim on his family drama Hithey Dheymee, which received negative reviews from critics and was a box office disaster.

In 2017, Mohamed was cast alongside Yoosuf Shafeeu, Fathimath Azifa, and Jadhulla Ismail in the Mohamed Aboobakuru-directed Neydhen Vakivaakah, which was a critical and commercial failure. The following year was a slow one for the Maldivian film industry due to the presidential election, and Mohamed only appeared in one film: a suspense thriller titled Dhevansoora, written and directed by Yoosuf Shafeeu. Speaking of Mohamed's performance, Ahmed Hameed Adam of VNews wrote: "Though Mohamed has a small and deviated role in terms of its main plot, she makes an impact with her performance".

In 2019, Mohamed's first appearance was in Moomin Fuad's psychological horror thriller Nivairoalhi, which marked Niuma Mohamed's last film as an actress. Mohamed then starred in Ali Seezan's television series Furabandhu, which depicts the life of a family struggling through the COVID-19 lockdown. Shen later collaborated with Yoosuf Shafeeu for his romantic comedy web series Huvaa Kohfa Bunan, opposite Ahmed Saeed.

In 2021, Mohamed had three releases: She appeared in three segments of the anthology web series Hatharu Manzaru, she collaborated with Ali Shazleem in the suspense thriller web series Nafsu, and she starred opposite Mohamed Faisal in the romantic web series Loabi Vias.

In 2023, Mohamed appeared in a comedic role in the Yoosuf Shafeeu-directed film Jokaru. Aminath Luba from The Press praised the performances, including Mohamed's.

== Media image ==
In 2018, Mohamed was ranked ninth in Dho?'s list of Top Ten Actresses of Maldives, with writer Aishath Maaha opining that she is a "promising" actress who is still "relevant even during her long career".

== Filmography ==
=== Film ===
Year	Title	Role	Notes	Ref(s)
2004	Hama Himeyn	Nashidha		
2004	Eynaa	Nasra		
2006	Hiyani	Zahid's mistress	Special appearance	
2007	Aharen	Nadira		
2010	Maafeh Neiy	Faza		
2010	Dhin Veynuge Hithaamaigaa	Shaanee		
2010	Zalzalaa En'buri Aun	Fazu		
2011	Loodhifa	Fazu		
2011	Hithey Dheymee	Rish		
2011	Zaharu	Liusha		
2017	Neydhen Vakivaakah	Sheeza		
2018	Dhevansoora	Thuhufa		
2019	Nivairoalhi	Aminath		
2023	Jokaru	Mahira		

=== Television ===
Year	Title	Role	Notes	Ref(s)
2004	Dhanmaanu	Latheefa		
2005	Kalaage Haqqugaa	Zeena	Recurring role	
2005	Baiveriyaa	Zulfa	Recurring role; 6 episodes	
2006	Ikhthiyaaru			
2009	Ssshhh... Miee Sirreh!	Fazu	Main role; 5 episodes	
2012	Dhirumeh Nethas	Azma	Main role; 5 episodes	
2018–2020	Huvaa	Zoya	Recurring role	
2019	Furabandhu		Main role; 5 episodes	
2020–2021	Huvaa Kohfa Bunan	Nashidha	Main role	
2021	Hatharu Manzaru	Reesha	Main role in the segments "Fulhi" and "Naama"	
2021	Nafsu	Shamsiyya	Recurring role; 10 episodes	
2021	Loabi Vias	Athika	Main role; 8 episodes	
2022	Biruveri Vaahaka	Customer	Guest role; episode: "Edhun"	
2025	Loaiybahtakaa	Rifa	Main role; 6 episodes	

=== Short film ===
Year	Title	Role	Notes	Ref(s)
2006	Dheke Dhekeves 3	Sharumeela		
2006	Neha	Neha		
2006	Dheke Dhekeves 4	Sharumeela		
2007	Minikaa Dhaitha	Minikaa Dhaitha		
2007	Kuri Inthizaaruge Nimun	Neetha		
2007	Fenu Paree	Neelam		
2007	Fahu Sofha	Mariyam		
2007	Paneeno	Yazeelio	Special appearance	
2007	Nama Nama Usmaan			
2008	Lily Magu	Nadhuwa		
2008	Kurafi Dhaadha	Super Girl		
2009	Dheulhi Ehnuvi Dhiulhi	Fatheela		
2009	Beyinsaafu	Sara		
2010	Dhekafi	Azma		
2010	Fahun Rangalhuvaane 2	Gamarunnisaa		
