= Karuna Vee Beyvafa =

- Official film poster
- Directed by: Ali Seezan
- Written by: Amir Saleem
- Screenplay by: Amir Saleem
- Produced by: Hussain Nooradeen
- Starring: Niuma Mohamed; Ali Seezan; Nadhiya Hassan
- Cinematography: Ibrahim Wisan
- Edited by: Ali Seezan
- Music by: Ibrahim Nifar
- Production company: C-Xanal Movies
- Release date: April 7, 2009
- Running time: 176 minutes
- Country: Maldives
- Language: Dhivehi

Karuna Vee Beyvafa is a 2009 Maldivian drama film directed by Ali Seezan. Produced by Hassan Nooraddheen under C-Xanal Movies, the film stars Niuma Mohamed, Ali Seezan and Nadhiya Hassan in pivotal roles.

== Plotline ==
A happily married couple, Shimla Ali (Niuma Mohamed) and Imran Mohamed (Ali Seezan) deal with the unfortunate news of Shimla's infertility. She suggests Imran to marry another woman to fulfill his father's dream of having a grandchild. Imran storms off with anger and assured he will not marry anyone else. Desperately, Shimla begged her best-friend, Fathimath Rishmy (Nadhiya Hassan) to enter Imran's life as his second wife which she declined. However, as a favor for a friend in need, Rishmy later agreed to move on with the plan while keeping their friendship as a secret.

== Cast ==
- Niuma Mohamed as Shimla Ali
- Ali Seezan as Imran Mohamed
- Nadhiya Hassan as Fathimath Rishmy
- Koyya Hassan Manik as Ibrahim Mohamed
- Arifa Ibrahim as Kuda Manike; Rishmy's step-mother
- Fauziyya Hassan as Faathuma
- Nasmee as Aisha

== Soundtrack ==
Track listing
No.	Title	Lyrics	Singer(s)	Length
1.	"Fun Kiyaalugaa"		Nasir Ibrahim (Maliku)
2.	"Dheynuhey Loabi Edhey"		Shifa Thaufeeq, Umar Zahir
3.	"Gendhey Gendhey"		Thasneem
4.	"Karunavee Beywafaa"	Mohamed Abdul Ghanee	Mohamed Abdul Ghanee, Moonisa Khaleel
5.	"Thiya Loley"		Mumthaz Moosa, Aishath Inaya
