= Ahmed Asim =

Maldivian actor (born 1981)

- Born: 29 November 1981 (age 44); R. Rasgetheemu
- Occupations: Actor, editor, writer, Director
- Years active: 1999–present
- Children: 3

Ahmed Asim (born 29 November 1981) is a Maldivian actor, editor, director, and writer who has established a career in the Maldives Film Industry.

== Career ==
Asim made his screen debut with a video single alongside Jamsheedha Ahmed. His first film release was Mohamed Abdul Hakeem and Mohamed Nasheed directed family drama Kaiveneege Furathama Rey (1999) though he was first offered to play a role Haajara Abdul Kareem-directed Ajaaib (2000) which was released a year later. In the latter, Asim starred alongside Mariyam Nazima, Koyya Hassan Manik and Waleedha Waleed which depicts the relationship of two exemplary wives and their respective families regardless of societal norms.

Asim made a guest appearance in Yoosuf Shafeeu directed horror film Edhathuru (2004) which revolves around eight friends who go on a picnic to a haunted uninhabited island and their battle for survival. The film garnered critical appreciation specially for its sound effect and was a commercial success. The same year, he starred alongside Niuma Mohamed, Ali Seezan and Sheereen Abdul Wahid in Ahmed Nimal's horror film Handhu Keytha (2005) which unfolds the story of a man who was enchanted by a spirit while witnessing a lunar eclipse. In the film, he played the friend of Ziyan who has been possessed by the spirit. He next appeared in a brief role in Abdul Fatthah's critically praised romantic film Vehey Vaarey Therein (2003). Featuring Yoosuf Shafeeu, Jamsheedha Ahmed, Khadheeja Ibrahim Didi, Mohamed Shavin, Amira Ismail and Aminath Rasheedha in crucial roles, the film narrates the story of unrequited love, and proved to be one of the highest-grossing Maldivian films of the year. He rose to widespread prominence in the television industry with his performance as the only child in the family who marries his best-friend in the Arifa Ibrahim-directed critically acclaimed television series, Vairoalhi Ahves Sirrun (2005) which revolves around two best-friends involved in extra-marital affairs and who fail to practice their duty as husband and wife. Starring alongside Niuma Mohamed, Lufshan Shakeeb, Aminath Rasheedha and Mariyam Shakeela, the series was listed as one of the most successful television series.

His last release of the year was a collaboration with Fathimath Nahula in the critically appreciated and commercially prosperous project, a romantic drama film Zuleykha (2005) which narrates the journey of a nine years old girl seeking the lost love of her mother. Featuring an ensemble cast including Sheela Najeeb, Yoosuf Shafeeu, Ali Seezan, Mohamed Manik and Mariyam Enash Sinan, he played a small role of a defeated man in love. Thirty three housefull shows of the film were screened at the cinema making it the highest grossing Maldivian release of the year. The following year, Asim again collaborated with the team of Vairoalhi Ahves Sirrun for Arifa Ibrahim's another romantic television drama series, Vaguthu Faaithu Nuvanees (2006) which consists of fifty episodes. The series which follows the vengeance and retribution two best-friends go through when they both love the same person, features Asim in a role as an overly-attached boyfriend who reconciles with his father.

In 2009, Asim appeared in Ali Shifau's suspense thriller Happy Birthday which narrates the story of a simple man who receives a call on his birthday informing that his wife and son have been kidnapped, only to be returned for a ransom. Asim played the role of Ahmed, the younger brother of a straightforward man who had an unfortunate birthday. A total of five shows with little occupancy were screened at the cinema, declaring the film a commercial failure, despite the positive response from the critics. Winning five Gaumee Film Awards and twelve Maldives Film Awards, the film was also screened at the Venice Film Festival.

The next year, Asim starred in Abdul Fahtah's horror film Jinni alongside Ali Seezan and Mariyam Afeefa. Based on true incidents that occurred in an island of Maldives, he played the friend of Thahumeena who ultimately proposes her. Prior to release the film was marketed to be full of "suspense and uniqueness" compared to other mediocre Maldivian horror films. Upon release, the film received mixed reviews from critics; majority of them complaining for having the "same old feeling" of prior horror flicks though the performance were noted to be satisfactory. Despite the mixed reviews, the film witnessed a positive response at the box office, screening a total of twenty two housefull shows in Male', declaring it as a Mega-Hit.

In 2011, Asim played the role of Azeem, the boyfriend of an introverted prudent girl living a modest lifestyle, in the Moomin Fuad-directed crime tragedy drama Loodhifa. Featuring an ensemble cast, the film deals with current social issues in the society told from different perspectives of the characters. Made on a budget of MVR 600,000, the film was declared a commercial failure though it received widespread critical acclaim. His work in the film garnered him several award nominations, including a Gaumee Film Award nomination as the Best Editor and a nomination for the Best Supporting Actor and Best Editor in 2nd Maldives Film Awards. Asim's only release of 2017 was Ali Musthafa-directed Malikaa which did not do well at the box office.

Asim returned to the mainstream film-making with the Moomin Fuad-directed psychological horror thriller Nivairoalhi (2019) which marks Niuma Mohamed's last onscreen film. He spent two years in preparation for the character portrayal. Starring opposite Mohamed and Yoosuf Shafeeu, the film received majorly positive reviews from critics; Aishath Maaha of Dho? favored the performance of the lead actors and mentioned the "neat arrangement" of its screenplay though pointed out its "weak ending" to be unsatisfactory. Praising his performance as a religious extremist, Maaha wrote: "The most authentic and best performance by a leading actor in this film has to be Asim's performance fully justifying the hardworking undertaken behind the camera". Similar sentiments were echoed from Aminath Luba of Sun, where she picked Asim to be "outstanding" from the cast and opined he still has the "acting touch" though absent from the cinema for around seven years".

== Filmography ==
=== Feature film ===
Year	Title	Role	Notes	Ref(s)
2000	Kaiveneege Furathama Rey	Sameer		
2000	Ajaaib	Ahmed		
2001	Dhumah Eri Thari	Javidh		
2003	Vehey Vaarey Therein	Nathasha's boyfriend	Special appearance	
2004	Dharinnahtakai	Junaid		
2004	Edhathuru	Ahmed	Special appearance	
2005	Handhu Keytha	Shahid		
2005	Zuleykha	Hamid		
2007	Aharen	Junaid		
2009	Happy Birthday	Ahmed		
2010	Mi Hiyy Keekkuraanee?	Asim		
2010	Jinni	Ahmed		
2011	Loodhifa	Azeem	Also the editor Nominated—Maldives Film Awards for Best Supporting Actor	
2017	Malikaa	Hassan	Also the editor	
2019	Nivairoalhi	Moosa Haidhar "Hardy"		
2024	Lasviyas	Fayyaz		

=== Television ===
Year	Title	Role	Notes	Ref(s)
2003	Ujaalaa Raasthaa	Majid	Main role; 9 episodes	
2003–2004	Vaisoori	Shafraz / Siraj	In the segments "Kurin Visnaa Dhevunu Nama" and "An'dhiri Hayaaiy"	
2004	Kamana Vareh Neiy	Himself	Guest role; "Episode 2" and "Episode 4"	
2005	Loabi Vaanama	Ibrahim Umar	Recurring role; 7 episodes	
2005–2006	Vairoalhi Ahves Sirrun	Ahmed Nadheem	Main role; 52 episodes	
2006–2007	Vaguthu Faaithu Nuvanees	Ahmed Shamin	Main role; 50 episodes	
2007	Vimlaa	Shahidh	Main role; 26 episodes	
2008	FB!		Main role; 5 episodes	
2008	Loabin Hiyy Furenee	Ahmed Iyaz	Main role; 13 episodes	
2008	Manzilakee Thee Ey Magey		Main role; 26 episodes	
2008	Umurah Ekee Ulhen Bunefaa	Nihaz	Main role	
2009	Silsilaa	Nahid	Main role; 5 episodes	
2010	14 February	Mahil	Main role; 4 episodes	
2013	Adhives Eloaibah Gadharu Kuran	Maan	Recurring role	
2019	Mhendhan	Habeeb	Recurring role; 5 episodes Also the editor	
2020	Gamini	Mohamed Siraj	Main role; 13 episodes Also the editor	
2021	Loabi Vias	Fayaz	Main role; 7 episodes	
2021	Sirru	Amir	Main role; 5 episodes	
2021	Noontha?	Sanim	Main role in the segment "Rules & Regulations"	
2022	Biruveri Vaahaka	Niyaz	Main role; Episode: "Rah"	
2022	Netheemey	Rizvi	Recurring role; 5 episodes	
2023–2024	Yaaraa	Fayaz	Recurring role; 22 episodes	
2023	Hama Emme Meehekey	Hassan	Main role; 10 episodes	
2025	Loaiybahtakaa	Mamdhooh	Recurring role; 3 episodes	
2025	Chaalaakee			

=== Short film ===
Year	Title	Role	Notes	Ref(s)
2001	Juhaage Buhdhi 1	Ahmed Ismail	Children's short film	
2002	Juhaage Buhdhi 2	Ahmed Ismail	Children's short film	
2003	Juhaage Buhdhi 3	Ahmed Ismail	Children's short film	
2006	Handi Ganduvaru Dhonkamana	Mahesh		
2007	Barbafar			
2007	Magey Dharifulhu	Ali Abdulla		
2007	Kuri Inthizaaruge Nimun	Fiyaz		
2008	Lost Island	Zuhuree		
2008	Noonekey Nubunaashey	Zeehaan		
2008	Ummeedh	Mohamed		
2009	Dhekunu Huvafen	Nadheem		
2009	Kalaage Handhaanuga	Zanish	Also the director and editor	
2011	Bodu 13 Muassasaa	Azman	Also the editor	
2012	Kidnap	Nahu's friend		
2020	Thadhu	Yoosuf	Special appearance	

=== Other work ===
Year	Title	Director	Editor	Notes
2005	Dheke Dhekeves 2		Yes	Short film
2006	Dheke Dhekeves 3		Yes	Short film
2008	Lost Island	Yes		Short film
2010	Sirrun Hithaa Kulhelaafa		Yes	Television series; 10 episodes
2011	Loodhifa		Yes	Feature film
2011	Hithey Dheymee		Yes	Feature film
2017	Malikaa		Yes	Feature film
2017	Kalhaai Hudhu		Yes	Office Drama
2018	Akbar & Birbal		Yes	Television series; 13 episodes
2019	Raasthaa	Yes		Television series; 13 episodes
2019	Mhendhan		Yes	Web series; 5 episodes
2020	Gamini		Yes	Web series; 13 episodes
2021	Feehaali		Yes	Short film
2022–2024	Vihaali	Yes	Yes	Web series; 5 episodes

== Accolades ==
Year	Award	Category	Nominated work	Result	Ref(s)
2007	4th Gaumee Film Awards	Best Supporting Actor	Dharinnahtakai	Nominated	
2012	2nd Maldives Film Awards	Best Supporting Actor	Loodhifa	Nominated	
2012	2nd Maldives Film Awards	Best Editing	Loodhifa	Nominated	
2016	7th Gaumee Film Awards	Best Editing	Loodhifa	Nominated	
2017	PSM Office Drama Competition	Best Editing	Kalhaai Hudhu	Won	
2019	9th Gaumee Film Awards	Best Editing	Malikaa	Nominated	
