= Lufshan Shakeeb =

Maldivian film actor

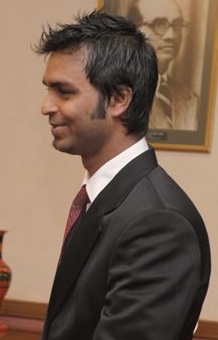
- Shakeeb in 2011
- Occupation: Actor
- Years active: 2004–present

Lufshan Shakeeb is a Maldivian film actor.

== Career ==
Shakeeb made his film debut in Yoosuf Shafeeu directed horror film Edhathuru (2004) which appears Mohamed Shavin, Sheereen Abdul Wahid, Ali Ahmed, Shakeeb, Fathmath Neelam, Nadhiya Hassan, Ibrahim Sobah and Yoosuf Solih as eight friends who go on a picnic to a haunted uninhabited island and their battle for survival. The film garnered critical appreciation specially for its sound effect and was a commercial success. He rose to widespread prominence in the television industry with his performance as an affectionate son seeking vengeance for his family's downfall and the confound lover who loses his girlfriend due to a bad judgement in the Arifa Ibrahim-directed critically acclaimed television series, Vairoalhi Ahves Sirrun (2005) which revolves around two best-friends involved in extra-marital affairs and who fail to practice their duty as husband and wife. Starring alongside Niuma Mohamed, Ahmed Asim, Aminath Rasheedha and Mariyam Shakeela, the series was listed as one of the most successful television series.

Moomin Fuad and Ali Shifau's critically appreciated crime film Heylaa (2006) featured Shakeeb as an obliging neighbor. The film narrates the story of a fourteen years old ambitious boy who finds himself unknowingly being involved in smuggling of a revolver. It was the first Maldivian film to be shot in high-definition digital video. Though the film received positive reviews from critics, it was a commercial failure. Co-director of the film Shifau opined that its commercial status was a result of casting "not very prominent" faces in the film and the "film-goers were not ready to accept the genre" at the time of release. Ahmed Nadheem from Haveeru praised the narration and plot of the film while calling his performance to be "strictly average". In April 2006, Ahmed Nimal's revenge thriller Hiyani was released which featured Shakeeb as the revenge seeking brother, punishing the man who cheated on his sister. The film which primarily focuses on a wealthy troublesome couple whose possessions have been exposed by the disappearance of the husband, was mostly received positively by the critics. At 5th Gaumee Film Awards ceremony, Shakeeb received two Gaumee Film Award nominations for Best Supporting Actor from Heylaa and Hiyani. The following year, Shakeeb again collaborated with the team of Vairoalhi Ahves Sirrun for Arifa Ibrahim's another romantic television drama series, Vaguthu Faaithu Nuvanees (2006) which consists of fifty episodes. The series which follows the vengeance and retribution two best-friends go through when they both love the same person, features Shakeeb in a role as a conflicted manager who is simultaneously attracted to two of his colleagues.

In 2009, Shakeeb starred as a guest appearance in Loaiybahtakaa which was written and directed by Yoosuf Shafeeu. The romantic drama, co-starring Shafeeu, Sheela Najeeb and Mohamed Faisal, tells the story of unrequited love, and proved to be a commercial success.

Shakeeb's first release of 2010 was Ali Seezan-directed family drama Maafeh Neiy alongside Seezan and Niuma Mohamed. The film highlights many social issues including human rights abuses, forced marriages and domestic violence. He played the role of Hamza, the love interest of Faza who ill-treats her own mother. The film received mixed reviews from critics, majority of them dismissing its melodrama and was a moderate success at box office. He next starred opposite Sheela Najeeb, Mohamed Manik and Yoosuf Shafeeu in Ahmed Nimal's horror film Zalzalaa En'buri Aun (2010). It was a spin-off to Aslam Rasheed's horror classic film Zalzalaa (2000) starring, Ibrahim Wisan, Ali Shameel and Niuma Mohamed. The film revolves around a mariage blanc, a murder of husband by his wife with secret lover and avenging of his death from everyone involved in the crime. He played the role of Ahmed, a lawyer who helps two murders to acquire the property of a deceased man. The film received mixed response from critics and it did average business at box office. He next reunited with Niuma Mohamed in Ahmed Nimal's horror film The Three, which received negative reviews from critics and was declared to be a box office disaster.

The following year, he played a brief role of Sappe, a revenging brother who exposes the counterfeit dollars business of his brother's murder, in the Moomin Fuad-directed crime tragedy drama Loodhifa. Featuring an ensemble cast, the film deals with current social issues in the society told from different perspectives of the characters. Made on a budget of MVR 600,000, the film was declared a commercial failure though it received wide critical acclaim, praising the performance of cast and the film's "realism" in its language, characters and their attitude. Shakeeb reunited with Niuma Mohamed in Hussain Munawwar's directorial debut romantic drama Sazaa (2011) featured alongside Ismail Rasheed. Story of the film revolves around a carefree girl whose life flips upside down once she is forced to marry a brutal man. He played the role of Zaid, a land surveyor from Male' who falls in love with a blithe person. Ahmed Nadheem reviewing from Haveeru wrote: "After a long time, [Shakeeb] gets much scope in a feature film and he has done a good job". Critically well-received, the film emerged as a commercial success. His performance fetched him a Best Actor nomination at 7th Gaumee Film Awards. He next appeared in Yoosuf Shafeeu's family drama E Bappa (2011), featuring an ensemble cast including Hassan Manik, Yoosuf Shafeeu, Mohamed Manik, Sheela Najeeb, Amira Ismail, Mariyam Shakeela and Fathimath Fareela. A film about fatherhood and how he has been treated by his family, received negative reviews for its "typical stereotype style" and was a box office failure.

Shakeeb's last release of the year was Ali Seezan's war action comedy film Wathan. Upon release the film received negative response from critics. Haveeru Daily felt the film "deceived" the audience in the name of action thriller; "I highly doubt if the project team was even sure of what kind of movie they were planning to make. It is a total mess between a serious action movie and scoop comedy". The film was further criticed for remaking several shots from Jim Abrahams's parody film, Hot Shots! Part Deux (1993).

== Media image ==
In 2011, Shakeeb was voted sixth place as the "Most Entertaining Actor" in the SunFM Awards 2010, an award night ceremony initiated by Sun Media Group to honour the most recognized personalities in different fields, during the previous year.

== Filmography ==
=== Feature film ===
Year	Title	Role	Notes	Ref(s)
2004	Edhathuru	Husham		
2006	Heylaa	Ashraf	Nominated—Gaumee Film Award for Best Supporting Actor	
2006	Hiyani	Yoosuf	Nominated—Gaumee Film Award for Best Supporting Actor	
2009	Loaiybahtakaa	Najah	Special appearance	
2010	Maafeh Neiy	Hamza		
2010	Zalzalaa En'buri Aun	Ahmed		
2011	Loodhifa	Sappe		
2011	Sazaa	Zaid	Nominated—Gaumee Film Award for Best Actor	
2011	E Bappa	Iyaz		
2011	Wathan	Capt. Niya		

=== Television ===
Year	Title	Role	Notes	Ref(s)
2003	Dheewanaa Hiyy	Fahud	Main role; 5 episodes	
2004	Vahum	Amir Idrees	Television film	
2004–2005	Loabi Nulibunas	Siraj	Guest role; "Episode 11"	
2005–2006	Vairoalhi Ahves Sirrun	Shah	Main role; 52 episodes	
2006–2007	Vaguthu Faaithu Nuvanees	Shifaz	Main role; 50 episodes	
2010	Diary	Mazin		
2012	Dhirumeh Nethas	Nafiu	Main role; 5 episodes	

=== Short film ===
Year	Title	Role	Notes	Ref(s)
2006	Handi Ganduvaru Dhonkamana	Zaid Khan		
2006	Kudafoolhuge Vasvaas	Himself	Special appearance	
2007	Fenu Paree	Huzam		
2007	Handi Ganduvaru Dhonkamana 2½	Zaid Khan		
2007	Nudhaashe Dhookohfaa Loabivaa	Hafiz		
2007	Paneeno	Yazeed		
2007	Fahu Sofha	Nazim		
2007	Nukandaa 2	Mustharee / Nihan		
2007	Kandu Vigani	Imran		
2007	Vigani	Imran		
2008	Prince of Madagaskara	Qadhir		
2008	Umurah Salaam	Shahid		
2008	Noonekey Nubunaashey	Naseem		
2009	Lhakoe	Lhakoe		
2010	The Tree	—N/a		

== Accolades ==
Year	Award	Category	Nominated work	Result	Ref(s)
2011	2nd SunFM Awards	Most Entertaining Actor		Nominated	
2008	5th Gaumee Film Awards	Best Supporting Actor	Hiyani	Nominated	
2008	5th Gaumee Film Awards	Best Supporting Actor	Heylaa	Nominated	
2016	7th Gaumee Film Awards	Best Actor	Sazaa	Nominated	
