= Nadhiya Hassan =

Maldivian film actress

Nadhiya Hassan is a Maldivian film actress.

== Early life ==
Hassan completed tenth standard education from Aminiya School. After graduation, she was offered to feature in several video songs being produced from notable production studios.

== Career ==
Hassan made her film debut with Yoosuf Shafeeu directed horror film Edhathuru (2004) which appears Mohamed Shavin, Sheereen Abdul Wahid, Ali Ahmed, Lufshan Shakeeb, Fathmath Neelam, Hassan, Ibrahim Sobah and Yoosuf Solih as eight friends who go on a picnic to a haunted uninhabited island and their battle for survival. The film garnered critical appreciation specially for its sound effect and was a commercial success. This was followed by Amjad Ibrahim's romantic drama film Hithuge Edhun (2006) which narrates the story of a disabled man where she played a small role of a lady having an affair with a married man. The same year, Hassan collaborated with Abdul Faththaah for his romantic disaster film, Hureemey Inthizaarugaa (2005) cast along with Ravee Farooq, Mariyam Zuhura, Waleedha Waleed, Ibrahim Jihad and Neena Saleem. The film, heavily relied on the effect of the 2004 Indian Ocean earthquake on the Maldives, received favorable reviews from critics though it failed to perform financially. Hassan played the best friend of Reena, who has been traumatized by the events that lead to a big loss in her family.

Ahmed Nimal-directed erotic horror thriller Khalaas was released in 2008 which follows a newly married couple who relocate themselves to Sri Lanka. Starring opposite Ali Seezan and Mariyam Afeefa, Hassan played the role of Reena, a cunning woman who seduces a hesitant married man. The film received mixed reviews from critics, specific appraisal being subjected to its bold and erotic theme. She next appeared in a small role in Fathimath Nahula's romantic drama film, Yoosuf which depicts the story of a deaf and mute man (played by Yoosuf Shafeeu) who has been mistreated by a wealthy family, mocking his disability. Featuring an ensemble cast including Yoosuf Shafeeu, Niuma Mohamed, Sheela Najeeb, Ahmed Nimal, Fauziyya Hassan, Mohamed Manik, Ravee Farooq, Zeenath Abbas and Ahmed Lais Asim, the film received widespread critical acclaim and was attained a blockbuster status at box office.

Hassan's first film release of 2009 was Yoosuf Shafeeu-directed Hiyy Rohvaanulaa which features Shafeeu, Niuma Mohamed and Abdulla Muaz alongside her. The film follows a blind man who regains his eyesight but decides to fake his blindness to discover her wife's affair with another man. Hassan played the role of Najoo, a school teacher and care-taking friend of a girl who is trapped in her previous relationship with a ruthless and determined man. The film received favorable reviews from critics and was a commercial success. Also, she appeared in a small role in Ahmed Nimal-E Dharifulhu (2009) featuring an ensemble cast including Niuma Mohamed, Yoosuf Shafeeu, Mohamed Manik and Sheela Najeeb. In her last release of the year, Hassan starred opposite Ali Seezan and Niuma Mohamed as the cold-hearted best friend and second wife in Seezan's melodrama Karuna Vee Beyvafa (2009). The film follows a downfall of a happily married couple on realizing the wife's infertility and destruction of their relationship with the invasion of a second wife. The following year, she starred in Amjad Ibrahim's romantic horror film Vakinuvinama alongside Niuma Mohamed and Ravee Farooq, which was a critical and commercial failure.

In 2011, Hassan was featured as Minna, one of the members in a spoiled mischievous girl gang, in the Moomin Fuad-directed crime tragedy drama Loodhifa. Featuring an ensemble cast, the film deals with current social issues in the society told from different perspectives of the characters. Made on a budget of MVR 600,000, the film was declared a commercial failure though it received wide critical acclaim, praising the performance of cast and the film's "realism" in its language, characters and their attitude. She next appeared in a brief role as a news presenter in Ali Seezan's war action comedy film Wathan, which received negative response from critics. The same year she collaborated with Amjad Ibrahim for his family drama Hithey Dheymee (2011) which received negative reviews from critics and was a box office disaster.

In 2014, Hassan starred opposite Ali Seezan in his directorial venture, psychological thriller Insaana, playing the mistress of Zabeer who unintentionally suggests him to murder his wife. It revolves around a murderer who tries to evade from the guilt after crime. Made on a budget of MVR 220,000, the film was inspired by Ryan Connolly's short psychological horror film Tell (2012) which is loosely based on the Edgar Allan Poe short story "The Tell-Tale Heart". Upon release, the film received widespread critical acclaim. Hassan Naail from Vaguthu called it "one of the best Maldivian release till date" and called her performance to be "commendable". At the 2015 South Asian Association for Regional Cooperation Film Festival, Insaana was bestowed with Bronze Medal as Best Film, competing with seventeen regional films.

== Filmography ==
=== Feature film ===
Year	Title	Role	Notes	Ref(s)
2004	Edhathuru	Reena		
2005	Hureemey Inthizaarugaa	Muna		
2006	Hithuge Edhun	Sofi		
2008	Khalaas	Reena		
2008	Yoosuf	Leesa's friend		
2009	Hiyy Rohvaanulaa	Najoo		
2009	E Dharifulhu	Faathun	Special appearance	
2009	Karuna Vee Beyvafa	Fathimath Rishmy		
2010	Dhin Veynuge Hithaamaigaa	Herself	Special appearance in the song "Annaashey Hinithun Velamaa"	
2010	Vakinuvinama	Rashfa		
2011	Loodhifa	Minna		
2011	Hithey Dheymee	Shaza		
2011	Wathan	News presenter	Special appearance	
2014	Insaana	Azu		

=== Television ===
Year	Title	Role	Notes	Ref(s)
2008	Hinithun Velaashey Kalaa	Fazna	Guest role; "Episode 52"	
2009	Mohamma Gaadiyaa	Herself	Guest role; "Episode 1"	
2010	Magey Hithakee Hitheh Noon Hey?	Salma	Main role; 5 parts	
2010	Thiya Loabeegai Abadhahme Vaanamey	Sama	4 episodes mini-series	
2012	Dhirumeh Nethas	Azma's friend	Recurring role; 5 episodes	

=== Short film ===
Year	Title	Role	Notes	Ref(s)
2004	Falhi Sikunthu 1	Herself	Special appearance in the song "Meheboob Magey"	
2004	Dheke Dhekeves 1	Pinky		
2005	Dheke Dhekeves 2	Pinky		
2007	Farihibe 1	Dhon Aisa		
2007	Loabeegaa Dhon U	Herself	Special appearance in the song "Dheynee Mi Hiyy Adhu"	
2007	Badi Edhuru	Mariyam Fazna		
2008	Vathukiba			
2009	Kafun	Fira		
2009	Dheke Dhekeves 5	Pinky		
2009	Pink Fairy	Paree		
2012	Dheke Dhekeves 6	Nashaath		
