= Mariyam Afeefa =

Maldivian actress (born 1983)

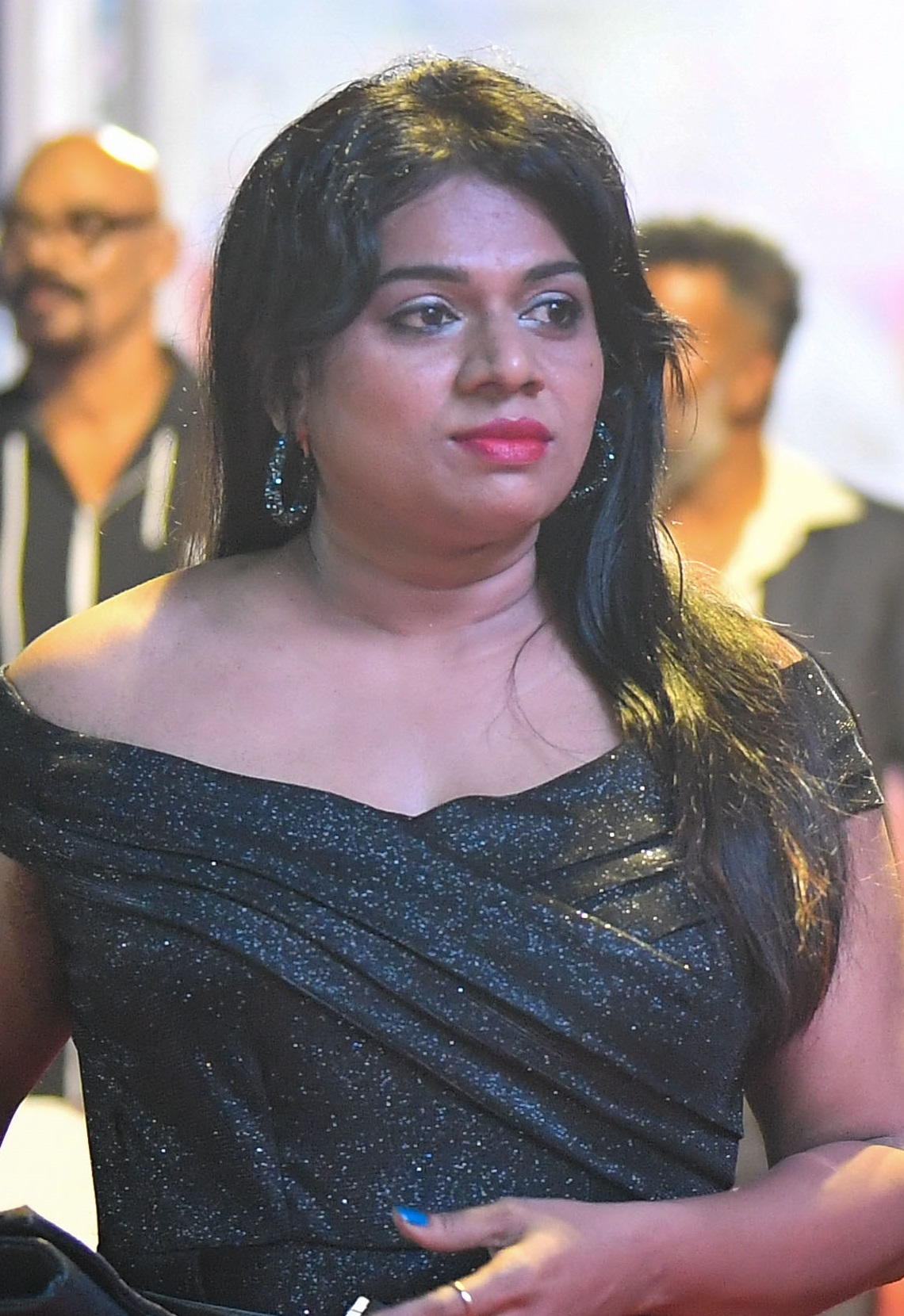
- Afeefa attends Olympus reopening ceremony, 2023
- Born: 29 July 1983 (age 43); Gn. Fuvahmulah
- Education: Gn. Atoll Education Centre
- Occupation: Actress
- Years active: 2006–present

Mariyam Afeefa (born 29 July 1983) is a Maldivian actress. She has established a career in Maldivian films and is the recipient of several awards, including two Gaumee Film Awards. She was featured in listings of the nation's most popular personalities.

Afeefa made her film debut in Ahmed Nimal's critically and commercially successful romantic film Vaaloabi Engeynama (2006), which fetched her first Gaumee Film Award for Best Actress. She then worked in several short films and television series before making her second collaborating with Nimal for his erotic horror thriller Khalaas (2008), followed by Abdul Fahtah's horror film Jinni (2010) where she received a Maldives Film Awards nomination as Best Actress for the latter. She was voted as the "Most Entertaining Actress" in the SunFM Awards for two consecutive years. In 2011, she was bestowed with her second Gaumee Film Award for Best Actress for her performance as the gluttonous wife, in the Moomin Fuad-directed crime tragedy drama Loodhifa (2011).

== Career ==
Afeefa made her film debut in Ahmed Nimal's romantic film Vaaloabi Engeynama (2006), starred alongside Yoosuf Shafeeu, Fathimath Fareela and Fauziyya Hassan which was a critical and commercial success, considered to be the most successful Maldivian release of the year. The film follows a conflicted husband struggling to convey equal affection towards his two spouses. Her performance as the superlative wife received critical appreciation, winning her a Gaumee Film Award as the Best Actress and a Miadhu Crystal Award as the Best Female Debut.

Ahmed Nimal-directed erotic horror thriller Khalaas was released in 2008 which follows a newly married couple who relocate themselves to Sri Lanka. Starring opposite Ali Seezan and Nadhiya Hassan, Afeefa played the role of Sara, a bewildered wife who encounters several supernatural activities. The film received mixed reviews from critics specific appraisal being subjected to its bold and erotic theme.

In 2010, Afeefa was featured in Abdul Fahtah's horror film Jinni alongside Ali Seezan. Based on true incidents that occurred in an island of Maldives, she played the role of Thahumeena, a simple-going girl who romantically link ups with a visitor and a ghost who seduce the same person in the shape of Thahumeena. Prior to release the film was marketed to be "full of suspense" and "unique" compared to other mediocre Maldivian horror films. Upon release, the film received mixed reviews from critics; majority of them complaining for having the "same old feeling" of prior horror flicks though the performance were noted to be satisfactory. Despite the mixed reviews, the film witnessed a positive response at the box office, screening a total of twenty two housefull shows in Male', declaring it as a Mega-Hit. At the 2nd Maldives Film Awards, Afeefa received a nomination for the Best Actress category.

Her first release of 2011, was Mohamed Aboobakuru's critical and commercial failure Hiyy Vindhaa Nulaa, where her role in the film was regarded and "unnecessary" and "meaningless". It was followed by her playing the role of Sherin, the gluttonous wife who is after her husband's wealth, in the Moomin Fuad-directed crime tragedy drama Loodhifa. Featuring an ensemble cast, the film deals with current social issues in the society told from different perspectives of the characters. Made on a budget of MVR 600,000, the film was declared a commercial failure though it received wide critical acclaim, praising the performance of cast and the film's "realism" in its language, characters and their attitude. At the 7th Gaumee Film Awards she was bestowed with her second Gaumee Film Award for Best Actress. She also received a nomination in the same category at the 2nd Maldives Film Awards ceremony.

== Media image ==
In 2010, Afeefa was voted as the "Most Entertaining Actress" in the SunFM Awards 2009, an award night ceremony initiated by Sun Media Group to honour the most recognized personalities in different fields, during the previous year, while defending the award in the next year. In 2012, she was ranked at the ninth position in the list of "Best Actresses in Maldives" compiled by Haveeru.

== Filmography ==
=== Feature film ===
Year	Title	Role	Notes	Ref(s)
2006	Vaaloabi Engeynama	Aminath Niha	Gaumee Film Award for Best Actress	
2008	Khalaas	Sara		
2010	Jinni	Thahumeena	Nominated—Maldives Film Award for Best Actress	
2010	Dhin Veynuge Hithaamaigaa	Herself	Special appearance in the song "Annaashey Hinithun Velamaa"	
2010	Mi Hiyy Keekkuraanee?	Aroosha		
2011	Hiyy Vindhaa Nulaa	Maisha's doctor		
2011	Loodhifa	Shenin	Gaumee Film Award for Best Actress; Nominated—Maldives Film Award for Best Actress	

=== Television ===
Year	Title	Role	Notes	Ref(s)
2005–2006	Fukkashi	Various roles	Main role; 5 episodes	
2006	Kuramey Vadhaaee Salaam	Aminath Yumna	Main role; 5 episodes	
2006	Saaraa		Main role; 13 episodes	
2006	Nethi Dhiyayas	Reena	Recurring role; 2 episodes	
2006–2008	Hinithun Velaashey Kalaa	Fazna	Main role; 48 episodes	
2007	Vamey Kaireegaa Kalaa		Main role	
2007–2008	Vimlaa	Vimla	Main role; 26 episodes	
2008	Manzilakee Thee Ey Magey		Main role	
2008	Umurah Ekee Ulhen Bunefaa	Sharuma	Main role	

=== Short film ===
Year	Title	Role	Notes	Ref(s)
2006	Kudafoolhuge Vasvaas	Suzanna	Special appearance in the song "E Dhanee Magey Suzaana"	
2007	Ossunu Iraaeku	Mariyam		
2007	Nudhaashe Dhookohfaa Loabivaa	Shabana		
2007	Fenu Paree	Suzanna		
2007	Kandu Vigani	Nizu		
2007	Vigani	Nizu		
2008	Umurah Salaam	Nafeesa		
2008	Noonekey Nubunaashey	Aleesha		
2008	Fini Fini Rey			
2009	Pink Fairy	Wafiyya		
2010	Dhekafi	Rishfa		
2012	Mammaa Ey			
2020	KKB: Kuda Kuda Baaru	Shiraz's wife		

== Accolades ==
Year	Award	Category	Nominated work	Result	Ref(s)
2007	1st Miadhu Crystal Award	Best Female Debut	Vaaloabi Engeynama	Won	
2008	5th Gaumee Film Awards	Best Actress	Vaaloabi Engeynama	Won	
2008	2nd Miadhu Crystal Award	Best Actress	Kandu Vigani	Won	
2008	2nd Miadhu Crystal Award	Best Makeup	Kandu Vigani	Won	
2010	1st SunFM Awards	Best Female Entertainer		Won	
2011	2nd SunFM Awards	Most Entertaining Actress		Won	
2012	2nd Maldives Film Awards	Best Actress	Jinni	Nominated	
2012	2nd Maldives Film Awards	Best Actress	Loodhifa	Nominated	
2016	7th Gaumee Film Awards	Best Actress	Loodhifa	Won	
