= Ali Seezan =

Maldivian actor

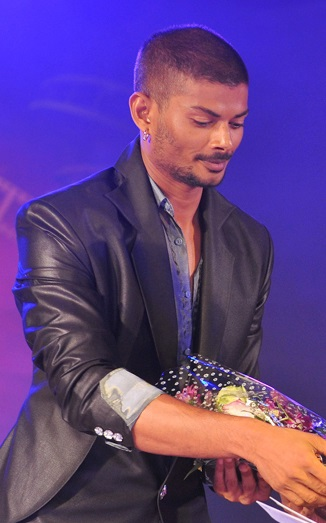
- Seezan at 2nd Maldives Film Awards ceremony, 2012
- Born: 6 February 1977 (age 49)
- Occupations: Actor, editor, director, producer
- Years active: 1998–present
- Spouses: Fathimath Azeez (divorced) Niuma Mohamed (m. 2004; div. 2006): Aminath Shanaaz
- Children: Shizan Ali Seezan

Ali Seezan (born 6 February 1977) is a Maldivian film actor, producer, director and editor. He has established a career in Maldives Film Industry and is a recipient of several awards, including two Gaumee Film Awards, and two Maldives Film Awards.

Seezan's journey in the film industry began when he worked as an assistant director for the film Maazee (1997), where he continued to work behind the scenes for over a year. He made his acting debut in 2000 Vana Ufan Dhuvas (2000). His breakthrough came with the film Hiiy Edhenee (2001) for which he received a Gaumee Film Award for Best Actor. He was later noted for his portrayal of a delusional husband in Dharinnahtakai (2004) earning him another. Best Actor nomination. He also portrayed a sympathetic doctor in Zuleykha leading to a Gaumee Film Award for Best Supporting Actor.

In 2005, Seezan ventured into working behind the camera while continuing his film appearances, by directing several short films including the action thriller Mission 24 (2006), the psychological thriller Ereyge Fahun (2006) and erotic thriller Kiss Jazbaath (2006), all of which were critical and commercial failure. However, this was followed by several commercial successes including his erotic thriller Khalaas (2008) and the melodrama Karuna Vee Beyvafa (2009). The year 2010 marked a successful period for Seezan with notable releases including the horror film Jinni, which earned him a Maldives Film Award nomination for Best Actor, the family drama Maafeh Neiy fetching him a Maldives Film Award nomination for Best Director nomination and his villainous role in Dhin Veynuge Hithaamaigaa granted him a Gaumee Film Award for Best Supporting Actor.

Following moderate success at box office with film including 14 Vileyrey (2011), Mihashin Furaana Dhandhen (2012), Love Story (2012), Seezan continued to experiment with various genres, including the action film Ahsham (2015) which earned him two Gaumee Film Award nominations, followed by the suspense thriller Vafaatheri Kehiveriya (2016), comedy film Naughty 40 (2017) and horror comedy 40+ (2019).

== Early life ==
Ali Seezan was born on 6 February 1977. His parents Fathimath Waheeda and Abdul Rasheed are not active members of the film industry, though his father has experience in organizing stage shows for various events related to showbiz. He completed his education at Madhrasathul Ameer Ahmed and Majeediyya School. He is the nephew of Maldivian actor and politician Reeko Moosa Manik. While studying he was an active participant in Scout and Cadet activities. During his school years, he actively participated in Scout and Cadet activities. In his early years, he didn't show much interest in pursuing a career in the entertainment industry, although he enjoyed making videos at home for leisure.

== Career ==
=== 1997–2009: Debut and early work ===
Seezan's journey in the film industry began as an assistant director on the film Maazee (1997), and he continued working behind the scenes for over a year. During this time, he decided to pursue a career in the film industry. With the help of actress Mariyam Nazima—a classmate of his elder sister—he made his first on-screen appearance in a video created to celebrate the 200th episode of Heyyambo (1998). He later appeared in three songs; first of them being "Neena" which was sung by Abdul Hannan Moosa Didi. Seezan committed to acting professionally and took on a supporting role in Easa Shareef's horror film 2000 Vana Ufan Dhuvas (2000). Although 2000 Vana Ufan Dhuvas marked his debut film, he had already begun acting for Slam Studio's Ekaniveriya, which was released later. In the former, he played the role of Latheef, a suspicious friend who tragically loses his life while trying to save his best friend.

In 2001, Seezan received significant acclaim for his role in Aishath Ali Manik's Hiiy Edhenee (2001) which was an unofficial remake of Dharmesh Darshan's romantic film Dhadkan (2000) starring Akshay Kumar, Suniel Shetty and Shilpa Shetty in the lead role. Cast opposite Sheela Najeeb and Asad Shareef, Seezan played the role of Vishal Amir, a religious-minded man with strong principles who values and respects his wife's sensibilities. The film proved to be a breakthrough for Seezan's career, earning him the Best Actor award at the 3rd Gaumee Film Awards ceremony. Following this success, he starred in IAbdul Faththaah-directed Aan... Aharenves Loabivin (2002), alongside Sheela Najeeb, Niuma Mohamed, Aminath Rasheedha and Neena Saleem. In the film, he played the character of Jina, a photographer who is compelled to feign a romantic relationship to assist his ex-lover, who is suffering from amnesia. Upon release, the film received positive reviews from critics and proved to be a commercial success. He also appeared in Mohamed Rasheed's Hithu Vindhu (2002) as a handicapped artist who struggles to fulfill his marital duties due to his physical limitations.

Seezan collaborated with Easa Shareef for the horror film Ginihila (2003), in which he starred alongside Mariyam Nisha, Niuma Mohamed and Reeko Moosa Manik, playing the role of Mifzal Amir, a reserved husband who hides the truth of his extramarital affair with a psychopathic girl. The film narrates the story of a young couple who decided to spend a romantic break to save their crumbling marriage and how events take a sinister turn when the wife experiences supernatural incidence which has her husband involvement in it. It was an unofficial remake of Vikram Bhatt's Indian horror film Raaz (2002) featuring Bipasha Basu, Dino Morea, Malini Sharma and Ashutosh Rana which itself is an unofficial adaptation of What Lies Beneath. The following year, he again worked with Easa Shareef for his action-adventure film Hatharu Udhares (2003) which received mixed to negative reviews from critics, where criticism was attributed for the post production of the film; more specifically for releasing a "half-baked" film. This was followed by his collaboration with Ahmed Nimal on two projects; Dharinnahtakai and Hama Himeyn. Seezan received his second Gaumee Film Award nomination for Best Actor for the former, for his portrayal of the character Shahid, a delusional husband who abandons his wife for another woman. In the latter, he portrayed a husband married to an emotionally immature wife, which received mixed to negative reviews from critics and did average business at box office.

In 2005, Seezan starred alongside Niuma Mohamed and Sheereen Abdul Wahid in Ahmed Nimal's horror film Handhu Keytha (2005), which unfolds the story of a man enchanted by a spirit during a lunar eclipse. In the film, he played the role of an unfaithful boyfriend who becomes possessed by the spirit. He made his first collaboration with Fathimath Nahula in the critically and commercially successful romantic drama television series, Kalaage Haqqugaa (2005), where he portrayed the character of Hassan, the elder brother of non-identical twins who tragically dies when the boat he is traveling in capsizes into the sea. He continued his collaboration with Fathimath Nahula in another critically acclaimed and commercially prosperous project, the romantic drama film Zuleykha (2005), which narrates the journey of a nine years old girl seeking the lost love of her mother. Featuring an ensemble cast including Yoosuf Shafeeu, Mariyam Nisha, Sheela Najeeb, Mohamed Manik and Mariyam Enash Sinan, Seezan played the role of a sympathetic doctor, which fetched him a Gaumee Film Award for Best Supporting Actor. Thirty three houseful shows of the film were screened at the cinema making it the highest-grossing Maldivian release of the year.

Ahmed Nimal-directed erotic horror thriller Khalaas was released in 2008 which revolves around a newly married couple who move to Sri Lanka. Starring opposite Mariyam Afeefa and Nadhiya Hassan, Seezan played the role of Fayaa, deceitful husband who becomes entangled with a woman who is later revealed to be deceased. The film received mixed reviews from critics, with specific attention given to its bold and erotic theme. The song "Haadha Dhahivethi Belumekey"–performed by Seezan alongside Mariyam Unoosha–from the film fetched him the Best Choreographer award at 1st Maldives Film Awards. The following year in 2009, he directed the melodrama film Karuna Vee Beyvafa (2009), in which he starred opposite Niuma and Nadhiya Hassan as a confused husband. The film depicts the decline of a once-happy married couple as they discover the wife's infertility and the subsequent deterioration of their relationship due to the arrival of a second wife.

=== 2010–12: Commercial success ===
Seezan's first release of 2010 was Abdul Faththaah's horror film Jinni, in which he starred alongside Mariyam Afeefa. Based on a true story that occurred on an island in Maldives, Seezan played the role of Javid, who falls in love with a girl and unwittingly becomes involved with a ghost created by his lover. Upon release, the film received mixed reviews from critics, with many expressing that it evoked the "same old feeling" as previous horror flicks, although the performances were deemed satisfactory. Despite the mixed critical reception, the film garnered a positive response at the box office. At the 2nd Maldives Film Awards, Seezan received a nomination in the Best Actor category. He next appeared in the family drama Maafeh Neiy alongside Niuma Mohamed, which was directed and produced by himself. The film highlights many social issues including human rights abuses, forced marriages and domestic violence. He played the role of Nawaal who is killed by necromancy for marrying a woman without her parents' consent. The film received mixed reviews from critics, majority of them dismissing its melodrama and was a moderate success at the box office.

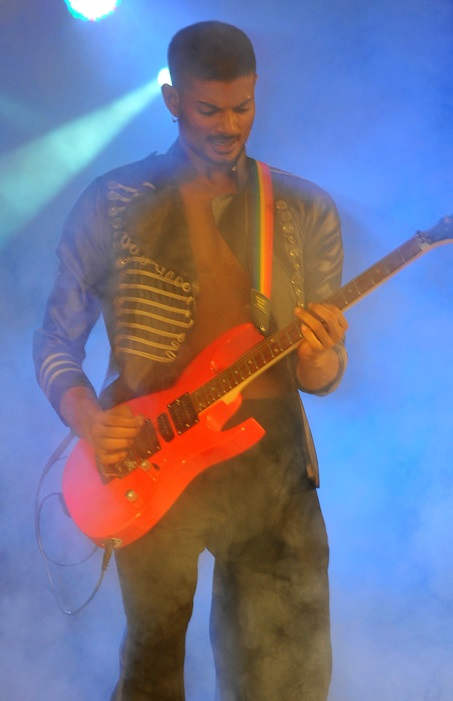
Seezan performing at 2nd Maldives Film Awards ceremony, 2012

In his next film release of the year, a family drama by Ali Shifau titled Dhin Veynuge Hithaamaigaa (2010), Seezan took on the role of Fairooz, a brazen manager seeking vengeance for his father's dismissal from the company. The film delves into themes of discrimination against islanders, family revenge, and fatherhood responsibilities. The film received positive response from critics, with particular praise for Seezan's performance in his villainous role. Critics noted that the scenes featuring the character Fairooz, enhanced by relevant background music, were among the best of their kind in Maldivian cinema. The film was considered a "significant improvement" compared to recent Maldivian films and enjoyed commercial success. For this role, he won the Best Supporting Actor award at the 2nd Maldives Film Awards and received a nomination for the Best Supporting Actor award at the 6th Gaumee Film Awards. He then reunited with Niuma Mohamed and Ravee Farooq in Amjad Ibrahim's romantic horror film Vakinuvinama which was a critical and commercial failure.

In 2011, Seezan featured in Ali Shifau's psychological romantic thriller Zaharu alongside Niuma Mohamed and Sheela Najeeb. The film revolves around a married man who has a weekend affair with a woman who refuses to allow it to end and becomes obsessed with him. He played the role of Hussain, an interior designer who has an extramarital affair with a long-lost friend. The film is inspired by Adrian Lyne-directed American psychological erotic thriller film Fatal Attraction (1987). Upon its release, the film received mixed response from critics and was declared a flop at box office. He then starred opposite Aishath Rishmy and Mariyam Nisha, in Abdul Faththaah-directed 14 Vileyrey. Written by Ibrahim Waheed, the film faced controversy when the team of Kuhveriakee Kaakuhey? accused Fatthah of "purloining the plot" of the latter. The film and his performance received mixed to positive reviews from critics; "Seezan handles the aggressive parts as well as the depression sequences with ease". The film did good business at box office and was declared a "Hit".

His next release was a war action comedy film Wathan which is directed, written, edited and produced by himself. Upon release, it received negative response from critics. Haveeru Daily felt the film "deceived" the audience in the name of action thriller; "I highly doubt if the project team was even sure of what kind of movie they were planning to make. It is a total mess between a serious action movie and scoop comedy". The film was further criticed for remaking several shots from Jim Abrahams's parody film, Hot Shots! Part Deux (1993). Seezan's last release of the year was Ahmed Azmeel's directorial debut Hiyy Yaara Dheefa (2011), in which he starred alongside Aishath Rishmy, Niuma Mohamed, Ahmed Azmeel and Aminath Rasheedha. The film received negative reviews from critics who pointed out similarities between Bollywood comedy-drama film Ishq (1997) and Kundan Shah's family drama Dil Hai Tumhaara (2002). He played Isham, a poor boy who falls in love with a rich girl. While the film did not achieve financial success, his portrayal was moderately acclaimed by critics.

In 2012, Seezan starred in the Ravee Farooq-directed romantic drama film Mihashin Furaana Dhandhen, opposite Niuma Mohamed. Upon its release, the film received mixed responses from critics, although his performance was positively recognized. Ahmed Nadheem of Haveeru described the film as "the best Maldivian melodramatic film" he had seen in the past two years but expressed displeasure with its similarities to two Bollywood films. It was followed by Abdul Faththaah's romantic film Love Story alongside Amira Ismail and Aishath Rishmy. He portrayed the character of Althaf Shair, who falls in love with the island chief's daughter. The film and his performance received negative response from critics. Nadheem criticized his role, calling it an "exact replica" of what he had portrayed in his previous release, Mihashin Furaana Dhandhen. Displeased with the screenplay and performance of the actors, he wrote: "the actors were not given sufficient scope to develop their characters and that the film was marred by excessive emotional scenes and overacting. He further noted that Seezan's performance seemed to "deteriorate as the weight of his role increased" in the film.

=== 2014–22: Experiment with different genres ===
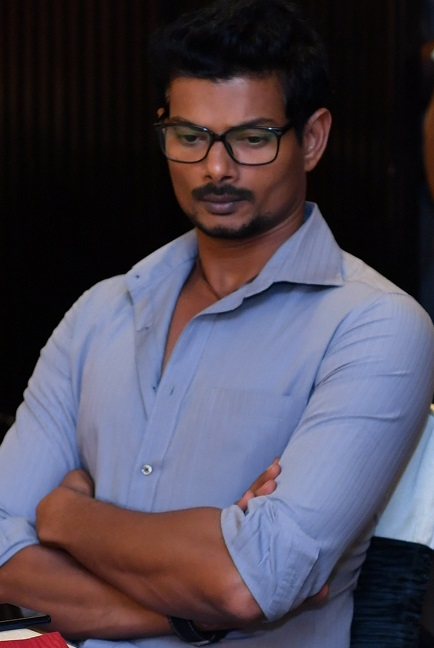
Seezan at Niuma Mohamed's Silver Jubilee celebration event, 2019

In 2014, Seezan starred opposite Aishath Rishmy in his directorial venture, the psychological thriller Insaana. In the film, he playing the timid and weak-minded man who commits the murder of his wife. The story revolves around a murderer's attempt to evade guilt after the crime. Made on a budget of MVR 220,000, the film drew inspiration from Ryan Connolly's short psychological horror film Tell (2012), which is loosely based on the Edgar Allan Poe short story "The Tell-Tale Heart". Upon its release, the film received widespread critical acclaim. Hassan Naail from Vaguthu called it "one of the best Maldivian release to date" and praised Seezan's performance, considering it his career-best. The film went on to receive the bronze medal for Best Film at the 2015 South Asian Association for Regional Cooperation Film Festival, competing against seventeen regional films.

The following year, Seezan released his first film under his own banner S. Productions. Titled Ahsham, the film was made on a budget of MVR 1,500,000, making it one of the most expensive films in the Maldivian film industry. While the film and Seezan's portrayal of the title character received mixed to positive responses from critics, his efforts in direction were well received. Ahmed Nadheem from Avas, praised the hard work and continuous effort put into producing the film, particularly in exploring a genre unfamiliar to the Maldivian audience. It was one of three entries from Maldives to the SAARC Film Festival 2016. At the 8th Gaumee Film Awards, Seezan received six nominations including, Best Actor and Best Director, Best Editing, Best Art Direction and Best Costume Design.

In 2016, Seezan's first release was Ahmed Nimal-directed horror film E Re'ah Fahu. The film received a negative response from critics and was declared a flop. His next release was the romantic film Vafaatheri Kehiveriya, which he directed himself. The film received mixed to negative reception from critics. Ahmed Nadheem from Avas attributed part of the film's reception to its title, which may have given the impression of an "old typical" taste. Despite the mixed reviews, Seezan's portrayal of the character Fayaa was considered an "overall good" performance.

He then appeared alongside an ensemble cast including Yoosuf Shafeeu, Mohamed Manik, Ahmed Saeed and Fathimath Azifa in the romantic comedy film Naughty 40 (2017), directed by Shafeeu. The film revolves around three friends in their forties who maintain a youthful outlook on life despite being single. The film achieved both critical and commercial success and emerged as one of the highest-grossing Maldivian films of 2017. He reprised the role in the horror comedy film 40+ (2019), which served as a sequel to the 2017 released comedy film Naughty 40, which was well received both critically and commercially.

In 2020, Seezan starred alongside Aminath Rishfa and Sheela Najeeb in his romantic drama film Andhirikan, in which he portrayed a confused husband who leaves his wife when she is unable to conceive a baby. Upon its release, the film received mixed reviews from critics and due to COVID-19 pandemic the film was pulled from theaters after only four shows were screened.

=== 2023–present: Further production ventures ===
In 2023, Seezan released the erotic thriller Loabi Vevijje, directed he also directed. In the film, portrayed an ordinary married man who becomes obsessed with an extramarital affair. Although the film was initially announced in 2019 but faced delays due to the COVID-19 pandemic, it eventually opened to generally positive reviews from critics. However, Seezan's performance in the film received mixed reviews from critics. Ahmed Nadheem from Dhauru criticized his acting range and wrote: "Seezan still seems to be stuck in his previous roles and avatars", while Aminath Luba reviewing from The Press opined that delivered the performance required for his role.

== Media image ==
In 2011, Seezan was selected in the top five as the "Most Entertaining Actor" in the SunFM Awards 2010, an award night ceremony initiated by Sun Media Group to honour the most recognized personalities in different fields, during the previous year. In 2018, he was ranked in the third position from Dho?'s list of Top Ten Actor of Maldives.

== Filmography ==
Key
†	Denotes films that have not yet been released

=== Feature film ===
Year	Title	Role	Notes	Ref(s)
2000	2000 Vana Ufan Dhuvas	Latheef		
2001	Hiiy Edhenee	Vishal Amir	Gaumee Film Award for Best Actor	
2002	Aan... Aharenves Loabivin	Jina		
2002	Hithu Vindhu	Aswad		
2003	Ginihila	Mifzal Amir		
2004	Hatharu Udhares	Junaid		
2004	Dharinnahtakai	Shahid	Nominated—Gaumee Film Award for Best Actor	
2004	Hama Himeyn	Faisal		
2005	Handhu Keytha	Ziyan		
2005	Zuleykha	Dr. Suheil	Gaumee Film Award for Best Supporting Actor	
2008	Khalaas	Faya	Also the producer and editor	
2009	Karuna Vee Beyvafa	Imran Mohamed	Also the director and editor	
2010	Jinni	Javid	Nominated—Maldives Film Award for Best Actor	
2010	Maafeh Neiy	Nawaal	Also the director and producer Nominated—Maldives Film Award for Best Director	
2010	Dhin Veynuge Hithaamaigaa	Fairooz	Nominated—Gaumee Film Award for Best Supporting Actor; Maldives Film Awards for Best Supporting Actor	
2010	Vakinuvinama	Zaid		
2011	Zaharu	Hussain		
2011	14 Vileyrey			
2011	Wathan	Mr. Bond	Also the director, producer, editor and writer	
2011	Hiyy Yaara Dheefa	Isham		
2012	Mihashin Furaana Dhandhen	Shiyaz		
2012	Love Story	Ahmed Althaf Shair		
2014	Insaana	Zabeer	Also the director and producer	
2015	Ahsham	Ahsham	Also the director and editor Nominated—Gaumee Film Award for Best Director; Nominated—Gaumee Film Award for Best Actor	
2016	E Re'ah Fahu	Ikuleel		
2016	Vafaatheri Kehiveriya	Fayaa	Also the director and editor	
2017	Naughty 40	Zahid		
2019	40+	Zahid		
2020	Andhirikan	Nihan	Also the director and producer	
2023	Loabi Vevijje	Tholal	Also the director and editor	
2023	Kalhaki	Nimal		
2023	Free Delivery	Himself	Special appearance in the song "U I Ah"	
2025	Koss Gina Mistake	Arumin	Also the director	
2026	Paree – Chapter 1	Ameen	Also the director	
2026	Paree – Chapter 2	Ameen	Also the director	

=== Television ===
Year	Title	Role	Notes	Ref(s)
2004–2005	Loabi Nulibunas	Imran	Main role; 15 episodes	
2005	Kalaage Haqqugaa	Hassan	Main role; 3 episodes	
2005	Baiveriyaa	Rayaan	Main role; 11 episodes	
2008	Just Friends		Main role	
2019	Karu Hakuru	Himself	Guest role; Episode "Ten Ants"	
2020	Furabandhu		Also the director and editor Main role; 5 episodes	
2021	Hatharu Manzaru	Unnamed	Main role in the segment "Naama"; Also the writer and editor of the segment	
2023–2024	Yaaraa	Rafkhan	Main role; 19 episodes	

=== Short film ===
Year	Title	Role	Notes
2006	Mission 24		Also the director
2006	Ereyge Fahun	Dr. Fazal	Also the director, editor and writer
2006	Kudafoolhuge Vasvaas	Himself	Special appearance
2006	Kiss Jazbaath	Ahmed Jana Jaleel	Also the director
2007	Handi Ganduvaru Dhonkamana	Kamana's father	Also the director, producer and writer
2007	Neena	Shifau	Also the director
2007	Thandi Rondi	Thandi Rondi's boss	
2007	Vigani	Zila	Also the director, producer and editor
2007	Fenu Paree	Fenu Paree's father	Special appearance Also the director, producer, writer and editor
2007	Fahu Sofha	Ibrahim	
2007	Handi Ganduvaru Dhonkamana 2½	Kamana's father	Also the director, producer and editor
2007	Kandu Vigani	Zila	Also the director, producer and editor
2008	Prince of Madagaskara	Imran	Also the writer
2008	Paruvaanaa	Seezan	Special appearance
2009	Kafun	Zila	Also the director and editor
2009	Lhakoe	Hamitte	
2010	Keevvehey Vakivee Yaaraa?	Faisal	

=== Other work ===
Year	Title	Director	Producer	Screenwriter	Editor	Notes
2006	Mission 24	Yes				Short film
2006	Ereyge Fahun	Yes		Yes	Yes	Short film
2006	Kiss Jazbaath	Yes		Yes	Yes	Short film
2007	Handi Ganduvaru Dhonkamana	Yes	Yes	Yes	Yes	Short film
2007	Neena	Yes				Short film
2007	Vigani	Yes	Yes		Yes	Short film
2007	Fenu Paree	Yes	Yes	Yes	Yes	Short film
2007	Paneeno				Yes	Short film
2007	Handi Ganduvaru Dhonkamana 2½	Yes	Yes	Yes	Yes	Short film
2007	Kandu Vigani	Yes	Yes		Yes	Short film
2008	Khalaas		Yes		Yes	Feature film
2008	Just Friends	Yes				Television series
2008	Prince of Madagaskara	Yes		Yes		Short film
2009	Kafun	Yes			Yes	Short film
2009	Karuna Vee Beyvafa	Yes			Yes	Feature film
2009	Seedhibe	Yes			Yes	Short film
2011	Wathan	Yes	Yes	Yes	Yes	Feature film
2014	Insaana	Yes	Yes			Feature film
2015	Ahsham	Yes			Yes	Feature film
2016	Vafaatheri Kehiveriya	Yes		Yes	Yes	Feature film
2019	Yes Sir	Yes				Web series
2020	Andhirikan	Yes	Yes		Yes	Feature film
2020	Furabandhu	Yes				Television series; 5 episodes
2021	Naama			Yes	Yes	Television series
2022	Dhoadhi				Yes	Web series; 15 episodes
2023	Loabi Vevijje	Yes			Yes	Feature film
2023	Kaushi	Yes	Yes			Sinhala film
2025	Koss Gina Mistake	Yes				Feature film

== Discography ==
Year	Album/Film	Song	Lyricist(s)	Co-Artist(s)
2008	Khalaas	"Haadha Dhahivethi Belumekey"	Amir Saleem	Mariyam Unoosha
2014	Tharinge Rey 2014	"Fenna Hin'dhu Konme Thaakun"	Abdulla Muaz Yoosuf	Aishath Maain Rasheed
2023	Loabi Vevijje	"Loabi Vevijje" (Promo song)	Mohamed Abdul Ghanee	Abdullah Shafiu Ibrahim, Ahmed Nimal, Ahmed Easa, Ali Azim, Mariyam Azza, Aminath Rishfa, Irufana Ibrahim

== Accolades ==
Year	Award	Category	Nominated work	Result	Ref(s)
2007	3rd Gaumee Film Awards	Best Actor	Hiiy Edhenee	Won	
2007	4th Gaumee Film Awards	Best Actor	Dharinnahtakai	Nominated	
2007	4th Gaumee Film Awards	Best Supporting Actor	Zuleykha	Won	
2011	1st Maldives Film Awards	Best Choreography	Khalaas	Won	
2011	2nd SunFM Awards	Most Entertaining Actor		Nominated	
2012	2nd Maldives Film Awards	Best Director	Maafeh Neiy	Nominated	
2012	2nd Maldives Film Awards	Best Actor	Jinni	Nominated	
2012	2nd Maldives Film Awards	Best Editing	Maafeh Neiy	Nominated	
2012	2nd Maldives Film Awards	Best Supporting Actor	Dhin Veynuge Hithaamaigaa	Won	
2015	6th Gaumee Film Awards	Best Supporting Actor	Dhin Veynuge Hithaamaigaa	Nominated	
2017	8th Gaumee Film Awards	Best Director	Ahsham	Nominated	
2017	8th Gaumee Film Awards	Best Actor	Ahsham	Nominated	
2017	8th Gaumee Film Awards	Best Editing	Ahsham (Shared with Ahmed Giyas)	Nominated	
2017	8th Gaumee Film Awards	Best Sound Editing	Insaana (Shared with Ibrahim Wisan)	Nominated	
2017	8th Gaumee Film Awards	Best Art Direction	Ahsham (Shared with Ibrahim Wisan)	Nominated	
2017	8th Gaumee Film Awards	Best Costume Design	Ahsham	Nominated	
2025	1st MSPA Film Awards	Best Lead Actor – Male	Kalhaki	Nominated	
