= Roanu Hassan Manik =

Maldivian actor

Hassan Manik
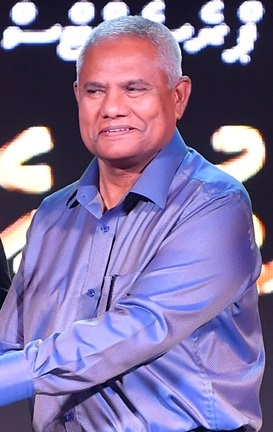
- Manik at 9th Gaumee Film Awards ceremony, 2019
- Born: 19 February 1958 (age 68); V. Villingili, Maldives
- Occupation: Actor
- Years active: 1977–present

Roanu Hassan Manik (born 19 February 1958), is a widely acclaimed Maldivian film actor, who mainly works in the Maldivian film industry.

== Early life ==
On 11 November 1977, while working as a Headmaster at educational centre, Manik produced, choreographed and starred in a theatre play, Vamundhaa Goiyy alongside his students which narrates the discrimination of locals moving from atolls to Male'. Afterwards he worked in several other theatre performances before making his screen debut in Musthafa Hussain-directed Gellunu Furaavaru (1980). Distributed through Television Maldives, Manik's talent was recognized by the producers and he was offered several films like Karudhaas Finifenmaa and Zaharu Dhin Ufaa which ultimately did not materialize. Afterwards, he went back to theatre performances played by CDS group and became a prominent name in the industry. However, due to the frequent trips out of island, Manik was unable to expand his career. He then starred in CDS's first film Dhon Hiyala Aai Alifulhu.

== Career ==
In 1996, Manik appeared in his first commercial film, Yoosuf Rafeeu's award-winning project Haqqu which featured Manik as Amjad, father of Shahid who forced his only son to marry a woman he dissent. The film starring Mariyam Nisha, Reeko Moosa Manik and Mariyam Shakeela in lead roles, received positive reviews from critics. He also appeared in a Television Maldives production, Fun Asaru which follows two women; one searching for her mother and one fighting cancer. This was followed by the Yoosuf Rafeeu's comedy film Nibu, an unofficial remake of Gulzar's Bollywood comedy film Angoor (1982), which focuses on two pairs of identical twins separated at birth and how their lives go haywire when they meet in adulthood.

He then stepped into Fathimath Nahula's critically and commercially successful romantic drama television series, Kalaage Haqqugaa (2005) to portray the role of Anwar, a wealthy businessman, starring opposite Niuma Mohamed, Ali Ahmed, Jamsheedha Ahmed and Sheela Najeeb. The following year, he collaborated with the team of Vairoalhi Ahves Sirrun for Arifa Ibrahim's another romantic television drama series, Vaguthu Faaithu Nuvanees (2006) which consists of fifty episodes. The series which follows the vengeance and retribution two best-friends go through when they both love the same person, features Manik in a recurring role as an obliging father.

In 2008, Manik appeared in a small role in Fathimath Nahula's romantic drama film, Yoosuf which depicts the story of a deaf and mute man (played by Yoosuf Shafeeu) who has been mistreated by a wealthy family, mocking his disability. Featuring an ensemble cast including Yoosuf Shafeeu, Niuma Mohamed, Sheela Najeeb, Ahmed Nimal, Fauziyya Hassan, Mohamed Manik, Ravee Farooq, Zeenath Abbas and Ahmed Lais Asim, the film received widespread critical acclaim and was attained a blockbuster status at box office.

Manik's first release of 2010 was Ali Seezan-directed family drama Maafeh Neiy alongside Seezan and Niuma Mohamed. The film highlights many social issues including human rights abuses, forced marriages and domestic violence. He played the role of Mohamed Fulhu, a father who forcefully marries his daughter to a wealthy businessman. The film received mixed reviews from critics, majority of them dismissing its melodrama and was a moderate success at box office. His next release was Ali Shifau-directed family drama Dhin Veynuge Hithaamaigaa where he featured in a supporting role of Manik, a lawyer. The film showcases discrimination against the islanders, family revenge and fatherhood responsibilities. The film was believed to be a "huge improvement" over the recent Maldivian films. Being able to screen fifteen housefull shows of the film, it was declared to be a commercial success. He next starred alongside Aminath Rasheedha, Aishath Rishmy and Ahmed Azmeel in Rishmy's drama film Fanaa. Based on a novel published by Ibrahim Waheed titled Balgish, the film received mixed to negative reviews from critics; Ali Naafiz from Haveeru Daily classified the film as the "worst Maldivian film released so far" during the year, criticing the performance of actors.

The following year, he featured in a small role in Ali Shifau's psychological romantic thriller Zaharu (2011) alongside Ali Seezan, Niuma Mohamed and Sheela Najeeb. The film centers on a married man who has a weekend affair with a woman who refuses to allow it to end and becomes obsessed with him. The film is inspired from Adrian Lyne-directed American psychological erotic thriller film Fatal Attraction (1987). Upon release the film received mixed response from critics and was declared a "flop" at box office. It was followed Abdul Fatthah's romantic horror film 14 Vileyrey, alongside Ali Seezan, Aishath Rishmy and Mariyam Nisha. Written by Ibrahim Waheed, the project faced controversy when the team of Kuhveriakee Kaakuhey? accuses Fatthah for "purloining the plot" of the latter. The film received mixed to positive reviews from critics and did good business at box office and was declared a "Hit". A "forgettable performance" of Manik was released with Hamid Ali's romantic family drama Laelaa alongside Amira Ismail and Yoosuf Shafeeu which was a critical and box office failure.

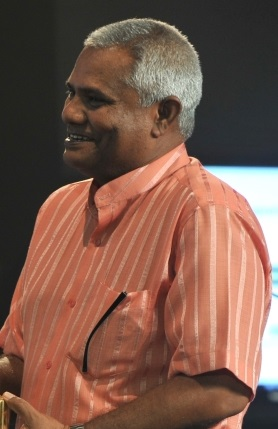
Manik at 1st Maldives Film Awards ceremony, 2011

In 2012, Manik played a middle class father in Ravee Farooq-directed romantic drama film Mihashin Furaana Dhandhen alongside Niuma Mohamed, Mohamed Manik and Ali Seezan. Upon release, the film received mixed response from critics while his performance was recognised positively. Ahmed Nadheem of Haveeru noted the film as "the best Maldivian melodramatic film" he had seen in the past two years, though displeased with its similarities between two Bollywood films. His portrayal of Hassan in the film resulted in a Gaumee Film Award nomination for Best Supporting Actor. It was followed by Abdul Fattah's romantic film Love Story alongside Ali Seezan, Amira Ismail and Aishath Rishmy. The film received negative response from critics. Displeased with the screenplay and performance of the actors, Ahmed Nadheem of Haveeru wrote: "None of the actors were given scope to build their characters and none was able to justify their character. With excessive emotional scenes, actors were exposed to over-acting and nothing more".

The following year, Manik collaborated with Hussain Munawwar for his second direction, revenge thriller film Dhilakani (2013) along with Ismail Rasheed, Niuma Mohamed, Mohamed Faisal and Aminath Rishfa. The film deals with a man's tumultuous journey to seek vengeance and the demolition of family bond over a girl. The film attracted negative reception from critics while Nadheem wrote: "Embraced with futile characters, impractical scenes and out-dated music, the film has problems in each department. Munawwar failed to extract the talent of actors like [Hassan Manik] who is one of the most accomplished actors in the industry".

In 2014, Manik appeared in the Aishath Fuad Thaufeeq-directed Hulhudhaan alongside Mariyam Majudha, which was a critical success. The film was later screened at the Venice Film Festival. His performance as Manik, an elderly man who was challenged by the harsh realities of his surroundings, received a positive response from the critics. At the 8th Gaumee Film Awards he was nominated for the Best Actor award for Hulhudhaan. The following year he appeared in the Ali Shifau-directed romantic film Emme Fahu Vindha Jehendhen (2015) alongside Mohamed Jumayyil. The film was the highest grossing Maldivian film of the year, and was a commercial success. It was followed by Ali Seezan's action film Ahsham, where he played the role of Ibrahim, Maeesha's father. The film, made on a budget of MVR 1,500,000, was considered as the most expensive film made in the Maldives. It was one of the three entries from Maldives to the SAARC Film Festival in 2016. The same year, he collaborated with Fathimath Nahula for 13 episodes television drama series, Umurah Salaan (2015) which centers on a squabble family which is separated due to the greed for money and misunderstandings. The series which stars Mohamed Faisal, Aminath Rishfa, Ahmed Azmeel and Mariyam Azza in lead roles, he portrays the character Saud, a disabled man who dies of a heart-attack.

In 2017, Manik featured in Ali Shifau-directed romantic comedy Mee Loaybakee alongside Mohamed Jumayyil and Mariyam Azza. The film which is considered to include the largest cast in a Maldivian feature film, narrates the story of two ex-lovers sliding into the friend zone with the envy and diffidence they experience amidst a convoluted love-triangle. The film and his performance as a womanizer received mainly positive reviews from critics. The film emerged as one of the highest grossing Maldivian films of 2017.

2018 was a dull year for Maldivian film-industry with regards to 2018 Maldivian presidential election. His only release of the year was the first Maldivian web-series, a romantic drama by Fathimath Nahula, Huvaa. The series consisting of sixty episodes and streamed through the digital platform Baiskoafu, centers around a happy and radiant family which breaks into despairing pieces after a tragic incident that led to an unaccountable loss. The series and his performance as a father of four children trying to bring peace into the family were positively received.

== Filmography ==
=== Feature film ===
Year	Title	Role	Notes	Ref(s)
1980	Gellunu Furaavaru			
1984	Dhonhiyala Aai Alifulhu			
1996	Haqqu	Amjad		
1996	Fun Asaru	Thakurufaanu		
1996	Nibu	Hussain		
1998	Dhauvaa			
2008	Yoosuf	Yasir's friend		
2010	Maafeh Neiy	Mohamed Fulhu		
2010	Dhin Veynuge Hithaamaigaa	Manik	Special appearance	
2010	Fanaa	Mamdhooha's Father		
2011	Zaharu	Aminath's father	Special appearance	
2011	E Bappa	Mazeena's father		
2011	14 Vileyrey	—N/a		
2011	Laelaa	Laelaa's father		
2012	Mihashin Furaana Dhandhen	Hassan	Nominated—Gaumee Film Award for Best Supporting Actor	
2012	Love Story	Ahammad		
2013	Dhilakani	Ibrahim Saleem		
2014	Hulhudhaan	Manik	Nominated—Gaumee Film Award for Best Actor	
2015	Emme Fahu Vindha Jehendhen	Samad		
2015	Ahsham	Ibrahim		
2017	Mee Loaybakee	Bodube		
2018	Vakin Loabin	Judge		
2018	Reyvumun	Bushree		

=== Television ===
Year	Title	Role	Notes	Ref(s)
1994	Inthizaaru			
2005	Kalaage Haqqugaa	Anwar	Recurring role	
2005	Fukkashi	Various roles	Main role; 3 episodes	
2006	Nethi Dhiyayas	Anwar	Main role; 5 episodes	
2006–2007	Vaguthu Faaithu Nuvanees	Waheed	Recurring role; 50 episodes	
2007	Reyfanaa		Recurring role	
2008	Inthihaa		Recurring role	
2008	Asarugai...		Recurring role	
2009	Silsilaa	Rahman	Recurring role; 5 episodes	
2010	Magey Hithakee Hitheh Noon Hey?	Abdulla Hameed	Main role; 5 parts	
2012	Kaiveni	Firasha's father	Main role; 5 episodes	
2015–2016	Umurah Salaan	Saud	Recurring role; 3 episodes	
2016	Bithufangi			
2018–2020	Huvaa	Hassan	Main role	
2021	Rumi á Jannat	Kuda Maalimee	Main role; 10 episodes	
2024	Dark Rain Chronicles	Hashim	Main role in the segment "Lafzu"	
2024–2025	Roaleemay	Haleem	Main role; 15 episodes	
2025	Hinthaa	Azeez	Main role; 10 episodes	
2025	Moosun	Faheem	Recurring role; 4 episodes	

=== Short film ===
Year	Title	Role	Notes	Ref(s)
2007	Magey Dharifulhu	Magistrate		
2012	Dheke Dhekeves 6	Thakurufaanu		
2020	KKB: Kuda Kuda Baaru	Hassan Manik		
2020	Anguru	Manik		

== Accolades ==
Year	Award	Category	Nominated work	Result	Ref(s)
2008	2nd Miadhu Crystal Award	Best Father	Vaguthu Faaithu Nuvanees	Won	
2011	1st Maldives Film Awards	Lifetime Achievement Award		Won	
2012	National Award of Recognition	Performing Arts - Acting and theatre performance		Won	
2016	7th Gaumee Film Awards	Best Supporting Actor	Mihashin Furaana Dhandhen	Nominated	
2017	8th Gaumee Film Awards	Best Actor	Hulhudhaan	Nominated	
