= Zeenath Abbas =

Maldivian actress

Fathimath Zeenath
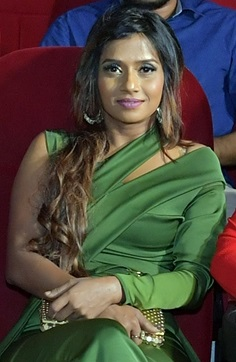
- Abbas at 9th Gaumee Film Awards ceremony, 2019
- Born: 14 August 1978 (age 47); Male', Maldives
- Occupation: Actress
- Years active: 1997–present

Fathimath Zeenath (born 14 August 1978), commonly known as Zeenath Abbas is a Maldivian actress. She has established a career in Maldivian films and is the recipient of a Gaumee Film Award.

Making her screen debut alongside Reeko Moosa Manik in the song "Edheythee Reethi Moona", her first film release was Mohamed Rasheed directed drama film Kuhveriya (1998). She next starred in Mariyam Shauqee's acclaimed family drama television series Kahthiri (1998) followed by a supporting role in Ali Musthafa-directed Umurah (1999) and Amjad Ibrahim-directed family drama Ainbehge Loabi Firiehge Vaajib (2000). She also collaborated with Ibrahim for his horror film Sandhuravirey 2 (2004) before appearing in the critically acclaimed crime film Heylaa (2006) which fetched her a Gaumee Film Award nomination for Best Actress. This was followed by a collaboration with Aishath Rishmy for the horror film Hukuru Vileyrey (2006) which garnered her first nomination for Best Supporting Actress.

Apart from starring in Fathimath Nahula's highest-grossing film Yoosuf (2008), Zeenath received critical acclaim for her role in Ali Seezan's action film Ahsham (2015) and Vee Beyvafa (2016) where she was bestowed with the Best Supporting Actress Award for the former while being nominated in the same category from the latter.

== Career ==
Zeenath made her screen debut with the song "Edheythee Reethi Moona" alongside Reeko Moosa Manik. Her first film release was Mohamed Rasheed directed drama film Kuhveriya (1998) starred opposite Moosa Zakariyya. Mariyam Shauqee's widely acclaimed family drama television series Kahthiri was released the following year, where she played the role of a spoiled daughter living in a congested housing complex, dealing with several social issues. This was followed by the Ali Musthafa-directed Umurah (1999) as a nurse opposite Jamsheedha Ahmed and Reeko Moosa Manik .

Amjad Ibrahim-directed Ainbehge Loabi Firiehge Vaajib, starring Abbas, Yoosuf Shafeeu, Jamsheedha Ahmed, Arifa Ibrahim and Niuma Mohamed was released in 2000. The film revolves around a woman who has been mistreated by her step-mother and forced into a marriage she disapproves. Abbas played the role of Lillian, an indolent daughter who ill-treats her own mother. She rose to widespread prominence in the television industry and was applauded for her performance as the cunning wife and a nurse, in the Abdul Faththaah-directed critically acclaimed television series, Thiyey Mihithuge Vindhakee (2003) which was considered one of the best series productions in television industry.

Zeenath next starred as an obsessive and heartbroken lover of an established actor in Amjad Ibrahim's next directorial venture Sandhuravirey 2 (2004); a sequel to his 2002 horror film Sandhuravirey which presented Yoosuf Shafeeu and Mariyam Nisha in lead roles. Starring additional cast including Niuma Mohamed, Mohamed Shavin and Sheereen Abdul Wahid, the film follows a storyline of a daughter jinn avenging the death of its mother and sister on Dhiyash's family. Similar to its prequel, the film received negative response from critics.

Moomin Fuad and Ali Shifau's critically appreciated crime film Heylaa (2006) featured Zeenath as a drug addict. The film narrates the story of a fourteen years old ambitious boy who finds himself unknowingly being involved in smuggling of a revolver. It was the first Maldivian film to be shot in high-definition digital video. Though the film received positive reviews from critics, it was a commercial failure. Co-director of the film Shifau opined that its commercial status was a result of casting "not very prominent" faces in the film and the "film-goers were not ready to accept the genre" at the time of release. Ahmed Nadheem from Haveeru praised the narration and plot of the film while criticizing the performance of Zeenath as the worst from the cast. Although her performance received poor reviews, she was nominated as the Best Actress at 5th Gaumee Film Awards ceremony. At the same ceremony, she was nominated as the Best Supporting Actress in the romantic horror film Hukuru Vileyrey (2006), co-directed by Aishath Rishmy and Aminath Rasheedha which was based on a novel published by Ibrahim Waheed on Haveeru Daily in 2003. The film was a critical and commercial success while being considered "one of the few acceptable horror films the Maldivian Film Industry has ever produced". It was later released as 15 episodes television series with inclusion of several clips that were edited off while released in theatre. This was followed by Amjad Ibrahim's romantic drama film Hithuge Edhun (2006) which narrates the story of a disabled man where she played a guest role of a lady being publicly humiliated.

In 2008, Zeenath appeared in Fathimath Nahula's romantic drama film, Yoosuf which depicts the story of a deaf and mute man (played by Yoosuf Shafeeu) who has been mistreated by a wealthy family, mocking his disability. Featuring an ensemble cast including Yoosuf Shafeeu, Niuma Mohamed, Sheela Najeeb, Ahmed Nimal, Mohamed Manik, Fauziyya Hassan, Ravee Farooq and Ahmed Lais Asim, the film is considered to include most prominent faces in a Maldivian film. The film received widespread critical acclaim and was attained a blockbuster status at box office. A total of forty five housefull shows were screened at Olympus Cinema before the film was leaked online, however the producers were able to screen five more shows at the cinema making it one of the Maldivian all-time highest-grossing movies. The film was Maldivian official entry at 2009 SAARC Film Festivals and holds the privilege of being the opening movie of the festival.

In 2010, Abbas starred alongside Aminath Rasheedha, Aishath Rishmy and Ahmed Azmeel in Rishmy's drama film Fanaa. Based on a novel published by Ibrahim Waheed titled Balgish, she played the villainous role. Upon release, the film received mixed to negative reviews from critics; Ali Naafiz from Haveeru Daily classified the film as the "worst Maldivian film released so far" during the year, criticing the performance of actors. However, other critics found the performance of Abbas to be "satisfactory in her evil role".

In 2015, Abbas appeared in Ali Seezan's action film Ahsham. Though the film received mixed reviews from critics, her performance in a negative shade was widely acclaimed. The film, made on a budget of MVR 1,500,000, was considered the most expensive film made in the Maldives. It was one of the three entries from the Maldives to the SAARC Film Festival in 2016. The following year, Abbas collaborated with Seezan to star in his romantic film Vafaatheri Kehiveriya (2016). The film received a mixed to negative reception from critics. Nadheem blamed the title of the film for giving the impression of "old typical" to the film. Her performance as Ainthu, a rich tycoon, was considered "too simple" for her "caliber". The same year, she featured alongside Niuma Mohamed and Yoosuf Shafeeu in Ibrahim Wisan's debut direction Vee Beyvafa which was shot in 2011. The film received negative response from critics where Ahmed Adhushan of Mihaaru concluded his review calling the film "a step backward" in the progress of cinema. At the 8th Gaumee Film Awards Abbas was bestowed with the Best Supporting Actress award for Ahsham and was nominated for her performance in Vee Beyvafa in the same category. She was announced as a nominee for the Best Makeup artist for Ahsham.

Her first release of 2019 was the Moomin Fuad-directed psychological horror thriller Nivairoalhi (2019) which marks Niuma Mohamed's last onscreen film. Revolving around a patient suffering from depression, Abbas played a small role in the film. Starring opposite Mohamed, Yoosuf Shafeeu and Ahmed Asim, the film received majorly positive reviews from critics; Aishath Maaha of Dho? favored the performance of the lead actors and mentioned the "neat arrangement" of its screenplay though pointed out its "weak ending" to be unsatisfactory.

== Media image ==
In 2018, Zeenath was ranked in the third position from Dho?'s list of Top Ten Actresses of Maldives where writer Aishath Maaha opined that she is the perfect "villain" of the industry though Abbas can pull off soft and calm characters too.

== Filmography ==
=== Feature film ===
Year	Title	Role	Notes	Ref(s)
1998	Kuhveriya	Reema		
1999	Umurah	Raheema		
2000	Ainbehge Loabi Firiehge Vaajib	Lillian		
2004	Sandhuravirey 2	Dhiyana		
2006	Heylaa	Shahula	Nominated—Gaumee Film Award for Best Actress	
2006	Hukuru Vileyrey	Evil spirit	Nominated—Gaumee Film Award for Best Supporting Actress	
2006	Hithuge Edhun	Herself	Guest appearance	
2008	Yoosuf	Leesa		
2010	Fanaa	Neetha		
2015	Ahsham	Nashidha	Gaumee Film Award for Best Supporting Actress	
2016	Vafaatheri Kehiveriya	Ainthu		
2016	Vee Beyvafa	Shiuna	Nominated—Gaumee Film Award for Best Supporting Actress	
2019	Nivairoalhi	Nafeesa		
2019	Leena	Sama		
2020	Andhirikan	Athika		

=== Television ===
Year	Title	Role	Notes	Ref(s)
1998–1999	Kahthiri	Shifa	Main role; 34 episodes	
1999	Maafkuraashey	Zeenath	Recurring role; 4 episodes	
2003	Ujaalaa Raasthaa	Ameena Adam	Main role; 8 episodes	
2003–2004	Thiyey Mihithuge Vindhakee	Husna	Main role; 46 episodes	
2004–2005	Loabi Nulibunas	Shadhiya	Main role; 15 episodes	
2005	Loabi Vaanama	Niuma	Guest role; 2 episodes	
2008	Hinithun Velaashey Kalaa	Hana	Guest role; "Episode 44"	
2008	Loabin Hiyy Furenee	Zeyna	Main role; 13 episodes	
2008	Umurah Ekee Ulhen Bunefaa	Shameema	Main role	
2011	Hiyy Vanee Inthizaarugai	Zara		
2013	Vaudhey Mee	Shaaira	Main role; 8 episodes	
2019	Shhh	Reesha	2 episodes	
2019	Yes Sir	Lailaa/Zahira	Main role; 10 episodes	

=== Short film ===
Year	Title	Role	Notes	Ref(s)
2005	Falhi Sikunthu 2	Athika		
2006	Minikaa Dhaitha	Unnamed	Special appearance	
2006	Ereyge Fahun	Dr. Najfa		
2009	Dhanna Nudhanna	Rauna		
2009	Dhekunu Huvafen	Liusha		
2009	Fahun Rangalhuvaane	Dhon Sihthi		
2010	Dhanna Nudhanna 2	Rauna		

== Accolades ==
Year	Award	Category	Nominated work	Result	Ref(s)
2008	5th Gaumee Film Awards	Best Actress	Heylaa	Nominated	
2008	5th Gaumee Film Awards	Best Supporting Actress	Hukuru Vileyrey	Nominated	
2014	3rd Maldives Film Awards	Best Actress - Short film	Siyaasee Koalhun	Nominated	
2014	3rd Maldives Film Awards	Best Makeup - Short film	Siyaasee Koalhun (Shared with Fathimath Azifa)	Nominated	
2017	8th Gaumee Film Awards	Best Supporting Actress	Ahsham	Won	
2017	8th Gaumee Film Awards	Best Supporting Actress	Vee Beyvafa	Nominated	
2017	8th Gaumee Film Awards	Best Supporting Actress - Short film	Siyaasee Koalhun	Nominated	
2017	8th Gaumee Film Awards	Best Makeup	Ahsham	Nominated	
