= Fathimath Fareela =

Maldivian film actress

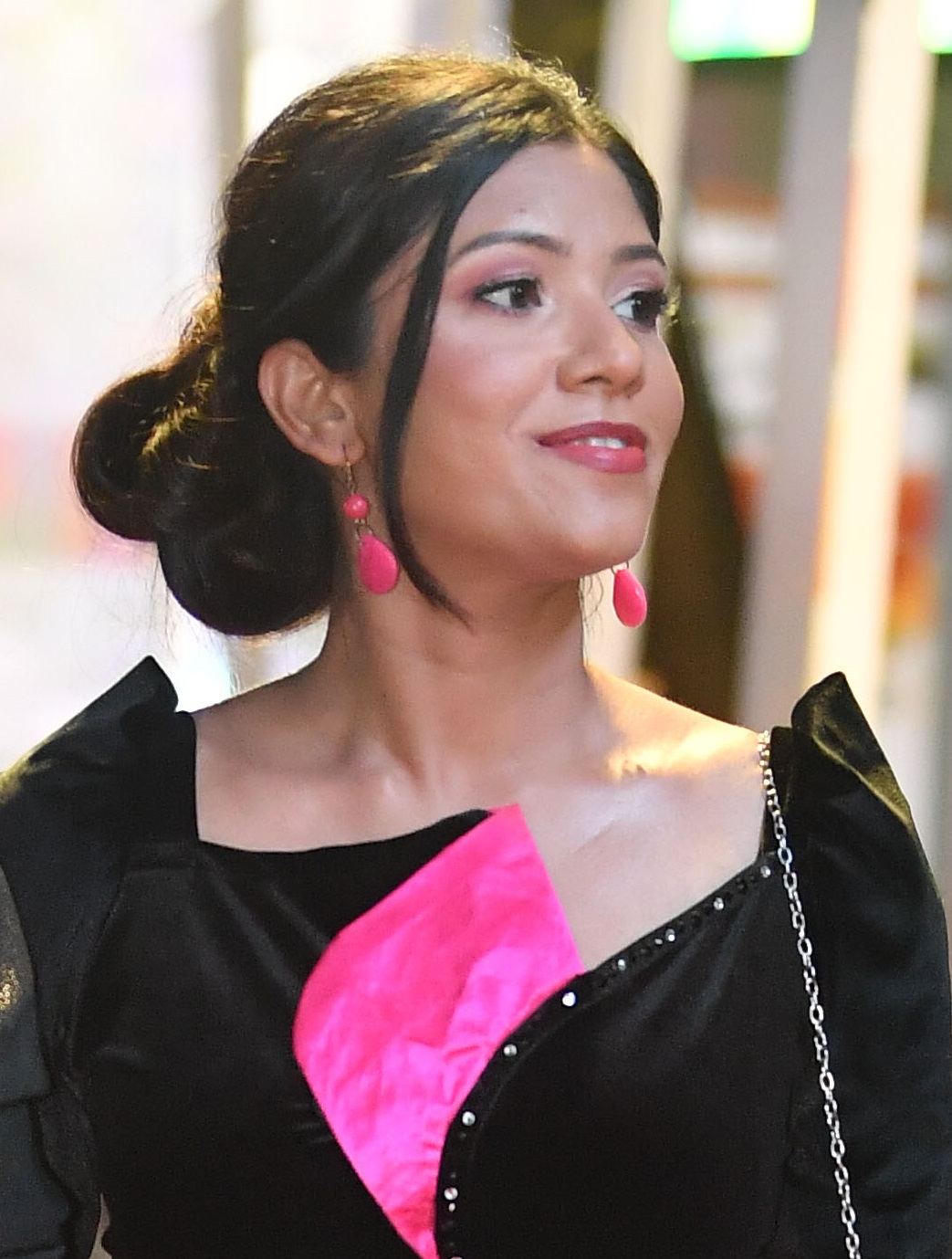
- Fareela attending Olympus reopening ceremony, 2023
- Born: 24 October 1984 (age 41); HDh. Kulhudhuffushi, Maldives
- Occupation: Actress
- Years active: 2006–present
- Spouse: Yoosuf Shafeeu (divorced)

Fathimath Fareela (24 October 1984) is a Maldivian film actress.

== Career ==
Fareela made her film debut in Ahmed Nimal's romantic film Vaaloabi Engeynama (2006), starred alongside Yoosuf Shafeeu, Mariyam Afeefa and Fauziyya Hassan which was a critical and commercial success, considered to be the most successful Maldivian release of the year. The film follows a conflicted husband struggling to convey equal affection towards his two spouses. Her performance as the grumbling wife received critical appreciation, winning her a Gaumee Film Award as the Best Supporting Actress.

In 2009, Fareela starred as the valiant and fearless girl who unintentionally falls in love with her sister's love interest in Loaiybahtakaa which was written and directed by Yoosuf Shafeeu. The romantic drama, co-starring Shafeeu, Sheela Najeeb and Mohamed Faisal, tells the story of unrequited love, and proved to be a commercial success.

This was followed by a horror film, Mendhamuge Evaguthu (2010) co-written and co-directed by Yoosuf Shafeeu alongside Amjad Ibrahim. It follows a group of ten friends watching a horror film which is being influenced by a narration in it. The last release of 2010, featured Fareela in Yoosuf Shafeeu's drama film Heyonuvaane (2010), opposite Shafeeu and Sheela Najeeb. The story revolves around a male who is victimised of domestic abuse. She played the role of Dr. Rizna Zareer, who meets her lover after six years settled with a marriage. The film received majorly negative reviews from critics though her performance was commended. Twenty two housefull shows of the film were screened at cinema, declaring it a Mega-Hit and second highest grossing Maldivian release of the year.

Fareela began 2011 with Amjad Ibrahim's suspense thriller film Hafaraaiy alongside Ali Shameel, Mariyam Shakeela, Yoosuf Shafeeu and Amira Ismail, which was a critical and commercial failure. Based on a real incidence, the film narrates a story of a cannibal woman who is addicted to eats human flesh, how she victimised the inhabitants with her face covered in a veil. The film received criticism for its "fragile" plot, "unnecessary" characters though its makeup was appreciated. Ahmed Naif from Sun wrote: "neither scientifically nor psychologically, it has been proven in the film how a chicken addict turns to be a cannibal. The film slides from a suspense thriller to a comedy for its inclusion of inconceivable details". He was displeased with Fareela's role citing it "small and unnecessary". She next appeared in Yoosuf Shafeeu's family drama E Bappa (2011), featuring an ensemble cast including Hassan Manik, Yoosuf Shafeeu, Mohamed Manik, Sheela Najeeb, Lufshan Shakeeb, Amira Ismail and Mariyam Shakeela. A film about fatherhood and how he has been treated by his family, received negative reviews for its "typical stereotype style" and was a box office failure.

In 2013, Fareela featured in Ali Shifau-directed horror film Fathis Handhuvaruge Feshun 3D which serves as a prequel to Fathis Handhuvaru (1997) starring Reeko Moosa Manik and Niuma Mohamed in lead roles. It was based on a story by Ibrahim Waheed, Jinaa: Fathis Handhuvaruge Feshun (2009), which itself is a prequel to the story Fathishandhuvaru (1996) written by himself which was later adapted to a film by same name in 1997. The film was marketed as being the first 3D release for a Maldivian film and the first release derived from spin-off. She played the role of Nihaa, the love interest of a ghost, Jinaa—played by Yoosuf Shafeeu that seeks revenge from humans for killing its wife. Upon release the film received generally negative reviews from critics. Ahmed Nadheem from Haveeru Daily wrote: "Everyone in the cast gave a forgettable performance. Fareela [still] needs to handle major scenes more efficiently such as in the climax where the entire ongoing things were revealed, her expressions and acting doesnt work there". Despite the negative reviews, at the 7th Gaumee Film Awards she was nominated in the Best Actress award category for her performance in the film.

In 2014, she played a supporting character in Mohamed Nimal-directed family drama Aniyaa alongside Ismail Rasheed and Mohamed Jumayyil and Niuma Mohamed.They were introduced by a common friend, Mohamed Hashim, a Maldivian diplomat based in UAE. The story of the film revolves around a boy who has been deprived of love from his parents. Due to several technical errors and struggle caused during the screening of the film, it failed to garner enough hype ultimately doing average to poor business at boxoffice. Next she starred opposite Ali Seezan and Aishath Rishmy in Seezan's directorial venture, psychological thriller Insaana, playing the friend of Hana who is murdered by her husband. It revolves around a murder and how the murderer tries to evade from the crime. Made on a budget of MVR 220,000, the film was inspired by Ryan Connolly's short psychological horror film Tell (2012) which is loosely based on the Edgar Allan Poe short story "The Tell-Tale Heart". Upon release, the film received widespread critical acclaim. Hassan Naail from Vaguthu called it "one of the best Maldivian release till date" and was satisfied with the performance of whole cast. At the 2015 South Asian Association for Regional Cooperation Film Festival, Insaana was bestowed with Bronze Medal as Best Film, competing with seventeen regional films.

In 2016, she appeared in Ibrahim Wisan's debut direction Vee Beyvafa which was shot in 2011. The film received a negative response from critics where Ahmed Adhushan of Mihaaru concluded his review calling the film "a step backward" in the progress of cinema. In 2019, first Maldivian anthology film was released which featured Fareela in the segment directed by Ali Shifau, titled Foshi. The project was shot in 2013 and digitally released six years later due to several delays in post-production.

== Filmography ==
=== Feature film ===
| Year | Title | Role | Notes | Ref(s) |
|---|---|---|---|---|
| 2005 | Hureemey Inthizaarugaa | Herself | Special appearance in the song "Bunedheyshey Mithura" | |
| 2006 | Vaaloabi Engeynama | Azu | Gaumee Film Award for Best Supporting Actress | |
| 2009 | Loaiybahtakaa | Shabee | | |
| 2010 | Mendhamuge Evaguthu | Mahira | | |
| 2010 | Heyonuvaane | Rizna Zareer | | |
| 2011 | Hafaraaiy | Neera | | |
| 2011 | E Bappa | Mazeena | | |
| 2013 | Fathis Handhuvaruge Feshun 3D | Niha | Nominated—Gaumee Film Award for Best Actress | |
| 2014 | Aniyaa | Zilma | | |
| 2014 | Insaana | Inaa | | |
| 2016 | Vee Beyvafa | Nisha | | |
| 2023 | Jokaru | Herself | Special appearance in item number "Vagunge Jagadaa" | |

=== Television ===
| Year | Title | Role | Notes | Ref(s) |
|---|---|---|---|---|
| 2012–2013 | Adhives Eloaibah Gadharu Kuran | Fazeela | Main role | |
| 2019 | Hatharu Halha | Sama | In the segment Foshi | |

=== Short film ===
| Year | Title | Role | Notes | Ref(s) |
|---|---|---|---|---|
| 2007 | Edhonveli Thundi 1 | Spirit | Voice-over | |
| 2008 | Edhonveli Thundi 2 | Spirit | Special appearance | |
| 2014 | Kashfu | —N/a | | |

=== Other work ===
| Year | Title | Director | Producer | Notes | Ref(s) |
|---|---|---|---|---|---|
| 2022 | Baby | | Yes | Web series; 3 episodes | |
| 2022 | Hissu | | Yes | Web series; 3 episodes | |
| 2022 | Bahdhal | | Yes | Web series; 3 episodes | |
| 2023 | Hayyaru | | Yes | Web series; 15 episodes | |
| 2025 | Imthihaan | | Yes | Web series; 10 episodes | |

== Accolades ==
| Year | Award | Category | Nominated work | Result | Ref(s) |
|---|---|---|---|---|---|
| 2008 | 5th Gaumee Film Awards | Best Supporting Actress | Vaaloabi Engeynama | Won | |
| 2008 | 5th Gaumee Film Awards | Best Choreography | "Anaashey" – Vaaloabi Engeynama | Won | |
| 2008 | 5th Gaumee Film Awards | Best Makeup | Hukuru Vileyrey (shared with Hassan Adam) | Won | |
| 2014 | 3rd Maldives Film Awards | Best Actress | Fathis Handhuvaruge Feshun 3D | Nominated | |
| 2014 | 3rd Maldives Film Awards | Best Choreography | Fathis Handhuvaruge Feshun 3D | Nominated | |
| 2016 | 7th Gaumee Film Awards | Best Actress | Fathis Handhuvaruge Feshun 3D | Nominated | |
| 2017 | 8th Gaumee Film Awards | Best Actress - Short film | Kashfu | Nominated | |
