= Yaaraa Productions =

Maldivian film production company

- Company type: Private
- Industry: Entertainment
- Headquarters: Male', Maldives
- Key people: Aminath Rasheedha; Aishath Rishmy
- Products: Film production

Yaaraa Productions is a Maldivian film production company based in Malé producing Maldivian films.

== History ==
The company's first production was Aishath Rishmy and Aminath Rasheedha's debut direction Hukuru Vileyrey (2006), which was based on a novel published by Ibrahim Waheed on Haveeru Daily 3 years before. The film was a commercial success. It was considered as "one of the few acceptable horror movies the Maldives film industry has ever produced". The film was later released as a 15 episode television series with the inclusion of several clips that were cut from the theatrical release. The company then went on to produce a family drama film Fanaa (2010) which was directed by Aishath Rishmy. Based on a novel published by Waheed titled Balgish, the film received a mixed to negative response from critics; Ali Naafiz from Haveeru Daily classified the film as the "worst Maldivian film released so far" during the year.

Their next production was Ahmed Azmeel's debut direction Hiyy Yaara Dheefa (2011), starring Ali Seezan, Aishath Rishmy, Niuma Mohamed, Ahmed Azmeel and Aminath Rasheedha. The film was a financial loss to the producers and received negative reviews from critics pointing to similarities with Bollywood comedy-drama film Ishq (1997) and Kundan Shah's family drama Dil Hai Tumhaara (2002). Six years later, they went on to produce Ravee Farooq's critically acclaimed crime thriller Vishka (2017) which revolves around a single-minded woman, Vishka, who gets trapped between an immoral person and a corrupt politician. Prior to release it faced controversies as Hassan Haleel requested a deferment in release claiming he allegedly owns the story and script of the film. However, the film was cleared for exhibition with the court order proclaiming that the ownership of the script and story belongs to Rishmy. Upon release, the film opened to a positive response from critics. The film was screened at the SAARC Film Festival 2017.

== Films produced ==
Year	Title	Director(s)	Producer(s)	Cast	Ref(s)
2006	Hukuru Vileyrey	Aishath Rishmy; Aminath Rasheedha	Aminath Rasheedha	Yoosuf Shafeeu; Aishath Rishmy; Zeenath Abbas; Mariyam Azza	
2009	Mihithah Loabi Dheyshey	Aishath Rishmy	Ismail Aziel Azmeel	Ahmed Azmeel; Aishath Rishmy; Mariyam Shakeela	
2010	Fanaa	Aishath Rishmy	Aminath Rasheedha	Aminath Rasheedha; Aishath Rishmy; Ahmed Azmeel; Zeenath Abbas	
2011	Hiyy Yaara Dheefa	Ahmed Azmeel	—N/a	Ali Seezan; Niuma Mohamed; Aishath Rishmy; Ahmed Azmeel; Aminath Rasheedha	
2017	Vishka	Ravee Farooq	Aishath Rishmy	Aishath Rishmy; Ravee Farooq; Ahmed Saeed	
