= Fanaa (2010 film) =

- Official film poster
- Directed by: Aishath Rishmy
- Written by: Ibrahim Waheed
- Screenplay by: Aishath Rishmy
- Produced by: Aminath Rasheedha
- Starring: Aminath Rasheedha; Aishath Rishmy; Ahmed Azmeel
- Cinematography: Hassan Haleem
- Edited by: Aishath Rishmy; Ahmed Azmeel
- Music by: Ayyuman Shareef
- Production company: Yaaraa Productions
- Release date: 14 June 2010
- Running time: 194 minutes
- Country: Maldives
- Language: Dhivehi

Fanaa (transl. Destroyed) is a 2010 drama film directed by Aishath Rishmy. Produced by Aminath Rasheedha under Yaaraa Productions, the film stars Rasheedha, Rishmy and Ahmed Azmeel. The film was released on 14 June 2010. It is the second film from Yaaraa Productions after 2006's horror film Hukuru Vileyrey. It is Azmeel's first appearance in a feature film. It was based on a novel published by Ibrahim Waheed titled Balgish.

== Cast ==
- Aminath Rasheedha as Zahira
- Aishath Rishmy as Mamdhooha "Mandhi"
- Ahmed Azmeel as Aadhan "Aadey"
- Ismail Aziel Azumeel as Zellu
- Zeenath Abbas as Neetha
- Aminath Shareef as Athifa
- Roanu Hassan Manik as Mamdhooha's Father
- Hussain Solah as Ahusan
- Ahmed Saeed as Fahud
- Mariyam Azza (Special appearance in "Dhopatta")

== Release and reception ==
Upon release, the film received mixed to negative reviews from critics. Ali Naafiz from Haveeru Daily classified the film as the "worst Maldivian film released so far" during the year, criticing the performance of the lead. However, other critics found the performance of Rishmy and Rasheedha to be on a "standing ovation" level, though they were displeased with the length of the film.

== Accolades ==
Award	Category	Recipients	Result	Ref.
2nd Maldives Film Awards	Best Male Debut	Ahmed Azmeel	Won	
6th Gaumee Film Awards	Best Director	Aishath Rishmy	Nominated	
6th Gaumee Film Awards	Best Actor	Ahmed Azmeel	Nominated	
6th Gaumee Film Awards	Best Actress	Aminath Rasheedha	Nominated	
6th Gaumee Film Awards	Best Supporting Actress	Aishath Rishmy	Won	
6th Gaumee Film Awards	Best Lyricist	Ahmed Nashid for "Thiya Jism"	Nominated	
6th Gaumee Film Awards	Best Cinematography	Hassan Haleem	Nominated	
6th Gaumee Film Awards	Best Screenplay	Ibrahim Waheed	Nominated	
6th Gaumee Film Awards	Best Choreography	Ismail Jumaih for "Yaaru Kairi"	Nominated	
6th Gaumee Film Awards	Best Costume Design	Aminath Rasheedha, Aishath Rishmy, Ahmed Shiyam	Won	
6th Gaumee Film Awards	Best Makeup	Hassan Adam	Nominated	
