= Malikaa =

- Official film poster
- Directed by: Ali Musthafa
- Written by: Ibrahim Waheed
- Screenplay by: Ibrahim Waheed
- Produced by: Malla Nasir; Ibrahim Rasheed
- Starring: Mohamed Jumayyil; Fathimath Azifa; Ali Azim; Nuzuhath Shuaib
- Cinematography: Moomin Fuad
- Edited by: Ahmed Asim
- Music by: Mohamed Fuad
- Production company: ES Entertainment
- Release date: March 2, 2017
- Country: Maldives
- Language: Dhivehi

Malikaa is a 2017 Maldivian romantic drama film directed by Ali Musthafa. Produced by Malla Nasir and Ibrahim Rasheed under ES Entertainment, the film stars Mohamed Jumayyil, Fathimath Azifa, Ali Azim and Nuzuhath Shuaib in pivotal roles. The film was released on 2 March 2017.

== Cast ==
- Mohamed Jumayyil as Munaaz
- Nuzuhath Shuaib as Malikaa
- Fathimath Azifa as Jeeza
- Ali Azim as Hassan
- Mariyam Shakeela as Salma
- Ahmed Shakir as Hussen
- Neena Saleem as Badhoora
- Ismail Zahir as Naseem
- Ahmed Asim as Ismail
- Sujeetha Abdulla as Fairooza
- Ali Farooq as Munaaz Father
- Mohamed Waheed
- Mohamed Afrah as Doctor

== Release and reception ==
The film was released on 2 March 2017.

== Soundtrack ==
Track listing
No.	Title	Music	Singer(s)	Length
1.	"Bappage Aadheys"	Mohamed Ahmed	Mohamed Ahmed
2.	"Ufaa"	Mohamed Fuad	Ahmed Tholal
3.	"Vey Ufaaverikan"	Fathuhulla Abdul Fahthah	Fathuhulla Abdul Fahthah, Mariyam Ashfa
4.	"Hiyy Magey Dhevijjey"	Fathuhulla Abdul Fahthah	Ibrahim Mamdhooh, Shifa Thaufeeq

== Accolades ==
Award	Category	Recipient(s) and nominee(s)	Result	Ref(s)
9th Gaumee Film Awards	Best Actor	Ismail Zahir	Nominated	
9th Gaumee Film Awards	Best Actress	Nuzuhath Shuaib	Nominated	
9th Gaumee Film Awards	Best Editing	Ahmed Asim	Nominated	
