= 6th Gaumee Film Awards =

- Date: 22 October 2015

Highlights
- Best Film: Happy Birthday
- Most awards: Niuma (6)
- Most nominations: Niuma (20)

The 6th Gaumee Film Awards ceremony honored the best Maldivian films released between 2008 and 2010. The ceremony was held on 22 October 2015.

== Winners and nominees ==
=== Main awards ===
Nominees were announced on 22 October 2015.

| Best Film | Best Director |
|---|---|
| Happy Birthday; Niuma; Veeraana; Zalzalaa En'buri Aun; Yoosuf | Moomin Fuad – Happy Birthday; Niuma Mohamed – Niuma; Ahmed Nimal – Zalzalaa En'buri Aun; Fathimath Nahula – Yoosuf; Aishath Rishmy – Fanaa |
| Best Actor | Best Actress |
| Yoosuf Shafeeu – Happy Birthday; Ahmed Nimal – Niuma; Yoosuf Shafeeu – Veeraana; Yoosuf Shafeeu – Yoosuf; Ahmed Azmeel – Fanaa | Niuma Mohamed – Niuma; Sheela Najeeb – Zalzalaa En'buri Aun; Niuma Mohamed – Hiyy Rohvaanulaa; Niuma Mohamed – Yoosuf; Aminath Rasheedha – Fanaa |
| Best Supporting Actor | Best Supporting Actress |
| Abdulla Muaz – Niuma; Mohamed Manik – Zalzalaa En'buri Aun; Ali Seezan – Dhin Veynuge Hithaamaigaa; Ahmed Nimal – Yoosuf; Ahmed Lais Asim – Yoosuf | Aishath Rishmy – Fanaa; Sheela Najeeb – Niuma; Aminath Rasheedha – Niuma; Aminath Samiyya – Veeraana; Sheela Najeeb – Heyonuvaane |
| Original Song | Best Lyricist |
| Shifa Thaufeeq, Ayyuman Shareef - "Bunaa Hiyy Vey" - Zalzalaa En'buri Aun; Shifa Thaufeeq, Ayyuman Shareef - "Aadhey Aadhey" - Zalzalaa En'buri Aun; Shifa Thaufeeq, Ayyuman Shareef - "Aadhey Araamu" - Zalzalaa En'buri Aun; Hussain Sobah, Ahmed Falah - "Hiyy Rohvaanulaa" - Hiyy Rohvaanulaa; Mohamed Fuad - "Araam" - Happy Birthday | Adam Haleem Adnan - "Hiyy Dhevijjey" - Niuma; Adam Haleem Adnan - "Vindhuthah Mihithuga" - Veeraana; Mohamed Abdul Ghanee - "Dhoadhi Ran" - Dhin Veynuge Hithaamaigaa; Abdul Hannan Moosa Didi - "Dhin Veynuge Hithaamaiga" - Dhin Veynuge Hithaamaigaa; Ahmed Nashid - "Thiya Jism" - Fanaa |
| Best Playback Singer – Male | Best Playback Singer – Female |
| Mohamed Abdul Ghanee - "Bunaa Hiyy Vey" - Zalzalaa En'buri Aun; Mohamed Abdul Ghanee - "Vee Banavefaa Adhu Falhuvefaa" - Veeraana; Mumthaz Moosa - "Hiyy Rohvaanulaa" - Hiyy Rohvaanulaa; Mumthaz Moosa - "Hithu Vindhaa" - Hiyy Rohvaanulaa; Ibrahim Zaid Ali - "Kon Kahala Lolhumeh" - Heyonuvaane | Shifa Thaufeeq - "Aadhey Araamu" - Zalzalaa En'buri Aun; Mariyam Ashfa - "Niuma" - Niuma; Aishath Maain Rasheed - "Hiyy Dhevijjey" - Niuma; Moonisa Khaleel - "Mausoom Hiyy" - Veeraana; Rafiyath Rameeza - "Aadhey Aadhey" - Zalzalaa En'buri Aun |

=== Technical awards ===
| Best Editing | Best Cinematography |
|---|---|
| Ali Shifau – Happy Birthday; Abdulla Muaz – Niuma; Yoosuf Shafeeu – Veeraana; Ahmed Nimal – Zalzalaa En'buri Aun; Fathimath Nahula – Yoosuf | Ibrahim Moosa Manik – Yoosuf; Ibrahim Moosa – Niuma; Ibrahim Moosa – Zalzalaa En'buri Aun; Hassan Haleem – Fanaa; Ali Shifau – Dhin Veynuge Hithaamaigaa |
| Best Screenplay (Original) | Best Background Music (Score) |
| Moomin Fuad – Happy Birthday; Ibrahim Waheed – Niuma; Ibrahim Waheed – Fanaa | Mohamed Ikram – Niuma; Ayyuman Shareef – Zalzalaa En'buri Aun; Ibrahim Nifar – Yoosuf |
| Best Sound Editing | Best Sound Mixing |
| Mohamed Ikram – Niuma; Ayyuman Shareef – Zalzalaa En'buri Aun; Fathimath Nahula, Hussain Shuhadh – Yoosuf | Hussain Shuhadh – Yoosuf; Ahmed Nimal, Ayyuman Shareef – Zalzalaa En'buri Aun; Mohamed Ikram – Niuma |
| Best Art Direction | Best Choreography |
| Fathimath Nahula – Yoosuf; Ibrahim Moosa – Niuma; Ahmed Nimal – Zalzalaa En'buri Aun; Moomin Fuad, Ali Shifau, Mohamed Ali – Happy Birthday; Mohamed Ali, Ali Shifau – Dhin Veynuge Hithaamaigaa | Fathimath Nahula, Ali Yooshau, Rustham Hassan – "Kiyaa Raagu Veynee" – Yoosuf; Ismail Jumaih – "Yaaru Kairi" – Fanaa; Yoosuf Shafeeu – "Hiyy Dhevijjey" – Niuma |
| Best Costume Design | Best Makeup |
| Aminath Rasheedha, Aishath Rishmy, Ahmed Shiyam – Fanaa; Shimla – Zalzalaa En'buri Aun; Mohamed Abdulla, Niuma Mohamed – Hiyy Rohvaanulaa; Ibrahim Ali, Aminath Hassan – Happy Birthday; Razeena Thaufeeq, Jadhulla Ismail – Yoosuf | Mohamed Manik – Niuma; Mohamed Manik – Yoosuf; Mohamed Manik – Zalzalaa En'buri Aun; Mohamed Manik – Dhin Veynuge Hithaamaigaa; Hassan Adam – Fanaa |

=== Short film ===
Best Film
- Faqeeru Koe
  - Ummeedhu

== Most wins ==
- Niuma - 6
- Happy Birthday - 5
- Yoosuf - 4

== See also ==
- Gaumee Film Awards
