= Hiyy Yaara Dheefa =

- Official film poster
- Directed by: Ahmed Azmeel
- Written by: Ahmed Azmeel
- Screenplay by: Ahmed Azmeel
- Starring: Ali Seezan; Niuma Mohamed; Aishath Rishmy; Ahmed Azmeel; Aminath Rasheedha
- Cinematography: Ibrahim Wisan
- Production company: Yaaraa Productions
- Release date: October 11, 2011
- Country: Maldives
- Language: Dhivehi

Hiyy Yaara Dheefa is a 2011 Maldivian romantic drama film written and directed by Ahmed Azmeel. Produced under Yaaraa Productions, the film stars Ali Seezan, Niuma Mohamed, Aishath Rishmy, Ahmed Azmeel and Aminath Rasheedha in pivotal roles. The film was released on 11 October 2011. The film revolves around four young people from different social classes fall in love with partners who do not meet with their parents' approval. It also highlights a daughter's craving for her mother's affection and her mother's constant rejection of her.

== Cast ==
- Ali Seezan as Isham
- Niuma Mohamed as Anju
- Aishath Rishmy as Nathasha
- Ahmed Azmeel as Anil
- Aminath Rasheedha as Nahidha

== Soundtrack ==
Track listing
No.	Title	Singer(s)	Length
1.	"Hiyy Yaaraa Dheefa" (Title Song)	Aishath Maain Rasheed, Mohamed Farhad, Ibrahim Nashidh, Hawwa Zahir	05:17
2.	"Hiyy Yaaraa Dheefa" (Promotional Song)	Ibrahim Zaid Ali, Mohamed Abdul Ghanee, Mariyam Ashfa	04:36
3.	"Thivee Beywafaa" (Version 1)	Mumthaz Moosa, Rafiyath Rameeza	05:39
4.	"Vejjey Fanaa"	Mohamed Abdul Ghanee	05:30
5.	"Loabivaa Ey"	Mohamed Abdul Ghanee, Mariyam Ashfa	04:40
6.	"Dheyshey Naa"	Ibrahim Zaid Ali, Aminath Lamha Latheef	05:18
7.	"Thivee Beywafaa" (Version 2)	Mumthaz Moosa, Moonisa Khaleel	05:39

== Release and response ==
The film was released on 11 October 2011. It received negative response from critics pointing similarities between Bollywood comedy-drama film Ishq (1997) and Kundan Shah's family drama Dil Hai Tumhaara (2002). Ahmed Nadheem from Haveeru wrote: "This is the most predictable Maldivian film I have watched so far. From the start to end, you can foretell the next scene, how its organized and so does the climax. Hiyy Yaara Dheefa is one boring-very much boring-Maldivian film I have watched". The film did not succeed financially, but performances were moderately acclaimed by critics.

== Accolades ==
Award	Category	Recipients	Result	Ref.
7th Gaumee Film Awards	Best Supporting Actress	Aishath Rishmy	Nominated	
7th Gaumee Film Awards	Best Playback Singer – Male	Mohamed Abdul Ghanee for "Loabivaa Ey"	Won	
7th Gaumee Film Awards	Best Playback Singer – Male	Mohamed Abdul Ghanee for "Vejjey Fanaa"	Nominated	
7th Gaumee Film Awards	Best Playback Singer – Male	Ibrahim Zaid Ali for "Dheyshey Naa"	Nominated	
7th Gaumee Film Awards	Best Playback Singer – Female	Mariyam Ashfa for "Loabivaa Ey"	Nominated	
7th Gaumee Film Awards	Best Playback Singer – Female	Rafiyath Rameeza for "Beyvafaa"	Nominated	
7th Gaumee Film Awards	Best Background Music	Mohamed Ikram	Nominated	
