= Mihithah Loabi Dheyshey =

Maldivian television drama series

- Official film poster
- Written by: Ahmed Azmeel
- Screenplay by: Ahmed Azmeel
- Directed by: Aishath Rishmy
- Music by: Muaviyath Anwar
- Country of origin: Maldives
- Original language: Dhivehi
- No. of episodes: 7

Production
- Producer: Ismail Aziel Azmeel
- Cinematography: Hassan Haleem; Shivaz Abdulla; Hussain; Ibrahim Wisan
- Editors: Aishath Rishmy; Ahmed Azmeel
- Production company: Yaaraa Productions

Original release
- Release: 2009

Mihithah Loabi Dheyshey is a Maldivian television series written by Ahmed Azmeel and directed by Aishath Rishmy. Produced by their son, Ismail Aziel Azmeel under Yaaraa Productions, the series stars Ahmed Azmeel, Aishath Rishmy and Mariyam Shakeela in pivotal roles.

== Cast ==
=== Main ===
- Ahmed Azmeel as Nawal
- Aishath Rishmy as Hudha
- Mariyam Shakeela as Nafeesa

=== Recurring ===
- Hamid Ali as Jaufar
- Aminath Shareef as Khadheeja
- Waleedha Waleed as Haatha
- Mohamed Faisal as Shareef
- Yooshau Jameel as Yooshau

=== Guest ===
- Ghafoor as a tenant (Episode 3)

== Episodes ==
No. in season	Title	Directed by
1	"Episode 1"	Aishath Rishmy
Nawal (Ahmed Azmeel), a promising staff from a construction company is married to Hudha (Aishath Rishmy), an indolent and negligent wife expecting for their first child. Nawal is assigned to lead the housing complex project in Thulusdhoo for five days. He insists Hudha to go along with him, however she preferred to stay back home with her sister, Haatha (Waleedha Waleed).
2	"Episode 2"	Aishath Rishmy
Nawal is received by Nafeesa (Mariyam Shakeela) who manages the guesthouse he stays at and lives next to his room. Nawal befriends with her, but she becomes upset when he inquires about her personal life. Later that night, he hears the sound of Nafeesa crying. When he takes a sneak peek into her room, Nawal witnesses Nafeesa's husband, Jaufar (Hamid Ali) physically abusing her.
3	"Episode 3"	Aishath Rishmy
Nawal confesses to Nafeesa that he eavesdropped the conversation last night and she demands him to keep it to himself. Haatha, realizing Hudha lacks in her sense of responsibilities, urges her to show some affection towards her husband before things slip out of their hands. Having no replacement at the site, Nawal decides to stay back in the island for further two days. On a rainy night, both Nafeesa and Nawal get locked in their balcony forcing them to spend the night together.
4	"Episode 4"	Aishath Rishmy
Confiding in each other, they spend the night discussing about their married life where Nawal discloses he is in an unhappy married life while Nafeesa reveals that Jaufar divorced her four years ago believing she is an infertile woman. They slowly start growing feelings towards each other even though Nafeesa is several years older than him. Suspicious of their relationship, Jaufar makes a surprise visit to their residence. Hudha realizes that Nawal is slowly distancing from her.
5	"Episode 5"	Aishath Rishmy
When Nafeesa raises her voice in front of Jaufar, he overpowers and wounds her. Nawal counsels her to fight against Jaufar and implies that Jaufar is concealing something with regard the couple's infertility. That night, unintentionally, Nawal and Nafeesa share sexual intimacy, which later creates a barrier of awkwardness among them. Concerned about Nawaal's welfare, Hudha visits him at the guest house uninformed, while he was preparing for departure.
6	"Episode 6"	Aishath Rishmy
The surprise from Hudha breaks Nafeesa's heart and creates discomfort between Nawaal and Nafeesa. As requested by Hudha, Nawaal extends his stay for further two days. Nafeesa and Nawaal agree to forget whatever happened that night and leave their memories aside.
7	"Episode 7"	Aishath Rishmy
Nawaal decides to shorten their trip and arranges all departure formalities. Nafeesa bids an emotional farewell to Nawaal thinking they will never meet again. However, things take an unexpected turn when Nawaal figures out that Nafeesa is pregnant to a child of his.

== Soundtrack ==
Track listing
No.	Title	Lyrics	Music	Singer(s)	Length
1.	"Mihithah Loabi Dheyshey"	Adam Haleem Adnan	Ibrahim Zaid Ali	Ibrahim Zaid Alii, Rafiyath Rameeza	4:47
2.	"Magey Reydhuvaa"	Boi Ahmed Khaleel		Ali Rameez	5:09

== Accolades ==
Year	Award	Category	Recipients	Result	Ref(s)
2010	Maldives Video Music Awards	Best Duet Song	Ibrahim Zaid Ali and Rafiyath Rameeza for "Mihithah Loabi Dheyshey"	Won	
