= Gaumee Film Award for Best Lyricist =

- Awarded for: Best Lyricist
- Country: Maldives
- Presented by: National Centre for the Arts

The Gaumee Film Award for Best Lyricist is given as part of the Gaumee Film Awards for Maldivian Films.

The award was first given in 1995. Here is a list of the award winners and the nominees of the respective award ceremonies.

== Winners and nominees ==
| Year | Photos of winners | Lyricist | Film and song | Ref(s) |
|---|---|---|---|---|
| 1st (1995) | | Abdul Qadir | "Vaane Kesseh Loabeega" – Maavaharuge Hadhiyaa | |
| 1st (1995) | | No Other Nominee | | |
| 2nd (1997) | | Mausoom Shakir | "Mooney Thiee Hiyy Edhey" – Haqqu | |
| 2nd (1997) | | No Other Nominee | | |
| 3rd (2007) | Not Available | | | |
| 4th (2007) | | Mohamed Rasheed | "Ossifavaa Iru Eree Ey" - Edhi Edhi Hoadheemey | |
| 4th (2007) | | No Other Nominee | | |
| 5th (2008) | | Ahmed Nashid | "Veynee Udhaas" - Hithuge Edhun | |
| 5th (2008) | | No Other Nominee | | |
| 6th (2015) | | Adam Haleem Adnan | "Hiyy Dhevijjey" - Niuma | |
| 6th (2015) | | Abdul Hannan Moosa Didi | "Dhin Veynuge Hithaamaiga" - Dhin Veynuge Hithaamaigaa | |
| 6th (2015) | | Adam Haleem Adnan | "Vindhuthah Mihithuga" - Veeraana | |
| 6th (2015) | | Ahmed Nashid | "Thiya Jism" - Fanaa | |
| 6th (2015) | | Mohamed Abdul Ghanee | "Dhoadhi Ran" - Dhin Veynuge Hithaamaigaa | |
| 7th (2016) | | Mohamed Abdul Ghanee | "Neyngey Bunaakah" - Mihashin Furaana Dhandhen | |
| 7th (2016) | | Easa Shareef | "Inthizaarey Othee" - Kuhveriakee Kaakuhey? | |
| 7th (2016) | | Mohamed Abdul Ghanee | "Nethifanaa" - Loodhifa | |
| 7th (2016) | | Mohamed Abdul Ghanee | "Alathu Loabi" - Love Story | |
| 7th (2016) | | Adam Haleem Adnan | "Mihashin Furaana Dhandhen" - Mihashin Furaana Dhandhen | |
| 8th (2017) | | Zero Degree | "Thakurah Baheh" - Hulhudhaan | |
| 8th (2017) | | Adam Haleem Adnan | "Ummeedh" - Vafaatheri Kehiveriya | |
| 8th (2017) | | Ahmed Furugan | "Noon Noon Nudhey" - Vaashey Mashaa Ekee | |
| 8th (2017) | | Mohamed Abdul Ghanee | "Aadheys" - Aadheys | |
| 8th (2017) | | Mohamed Abdul Ghanee | "Gandhee Huvaa" - Ahsham | |
| 9th (2019) | | Mausoom Shakir | "Hiyy Avas Vaa Goiy" - Bos | |
| 9th (2019) | | Abdulla Jailam Wajeeh | "Vishka" - Vishka | |
| 9th (2019) | | Mohamed Abdul Ghanee | "Dhuaa" - Hahdhu | |
| 9th (2019) | | Shammoon Mohamed | "Dhuniye Dhauruve" - Vakin Loabin | |
| 9th (2019) | | Zarana Zareer | "Dhin Ufaa" - Dhevansoora | |

== See also ==
- Gaumee Film Awards
