= Ereyge Fahun =

2006 film directed by Ali Seezan

- Directed by: Ali Seezan
- Written by: Ali Seezan
- Screenplay by: Ali Seezan
- Starring: Ali Seezan; Zeenath Abbas
- Cinematography: Ibrahim Wisan
- Edited by: Ali Seezan
- Production company: Apollo Entertainment
- Release date: 2006
- Country: Maldives
- Language: Dhivehi

Ereyge Fahun (eng: after that night) is a 2006 Maldivian supernatural psychological horror thriller film written and directed by Ali Seezan. Produced by Apollo Entertainment, the film stars Ali Seezan and Zeenath Abbas in pivotal roles. Majority of the scenes were shot in the Home for People with Special Needs, located in K. Guraidhoo. The film was an unofficial remake of the American supernatural psychological horror thriller film Gothika (2003) directed by Mathieu Kassovitz and written by Sebastian Gutierrez.

== Premise ==
Dr. Najfa (Zeenath Abbas), a psychiatrist diagnosing a patient, believes that she is possessed by a spirit and becomes personally invested in the case. One stormy night, when she was riding back home, Najfa meets with a car accident while trying to avoid hitting a girl, who turns out to be a ghost. The ghost possess Najfa while she was trying to help the girl. Najfa wakes up as a patient in the same hospital where she works and is diagnosed by her colleague, Dr. Fazal. It was revealed that Najfa has no memory of any event that happened in her life after the car accident. She is horrified on discovering that her husband, Dr. Munawwar was brutally murdered and Najfa is the prime suspect of the crime.

== Cast ==
- Ali Seezan as Dr. Fazal
- Zeenath Abbas as Dr. Najfa
- Abdulla Munaz as Dr. Munaz
- Ibrahim Wisan as Dr. Munawwar
- Hamid Ali as Najfa's father
- Aisha as Neena
- Shaliya as Aminath Laila
- Shifan as Shifan

== Soundtrack ==
Track listing
No.	Title	Singer(s)	Length
1.	"Mi Aalam Thereygaa Kalaa Noon Ehen"	Shifa Thaufeeq
