= 7th Gaumee Film Awards =

Award ceremony

- Date: 21 December 2016

Highlights
- Best Film: Loodhifa
- Most awards: Loodhifa (10)
- Most nominations: Loodhifa (19)

7th Gaumee Film Awards ceremony, honored the best Maldivian films released between 2011 and 2013. The ceremony was held on 21 December 2016.

== Winners and nominees ==
=== Main awards ===
Nominees were announced on 16 December 2016.

| Best Film | Best Director |
|---|---|
| Loodhifa; Ingili; Love Story; Sazaa; Fathis Handhuvaruge Feshun 3D | Moomin Fuad – Loodhifa; Ravee Farooq – Ingili; Abdul Faththaah – Love Story; Hussain Munawwar – Sazaa; Ali Shifau – Fathis Handhuvaruge Feshun 3D |
| Best Actor | Best Actress |
| Ismail Rasheed – Loodhifa; Ismail Rasheed – Ingili; Ahmed Saeed – Insaaf; Lufshan Shakeeb – Sazaa; Yoosuf Shafeeu – Fathis Handhuvaruge Feshun 3D | Mariyam Afeefa – Loodhifa; Amira Ismail – Love Story; Niuma Mohamed – Mihashin Furaana Dhandhen; Niuma Mohamed – Sazaa; Fathimath Fareela – Fathis Handhuvaruge Feshun 3D |
| Best Supporting Actor | Best Supporting Actress |
| Ravee Farooq – Loodhifa; Abdulla Muaz – Ingili; Ismail Rasheed – Sazaa; Ahmed Nimal – Mihashin Furaana Dhandhen; Roanu Hassan Manik – Mihashin Furaana Dhandhen | Fathimath Azifa – Loodhifa; Khadheeja Ibrahim Didi – Loodhifa; Aishath Rishmy – Love Story; Sheela Najeeb – Zaharu; Aishath Rishmy – Hiyy Yaara Dheefa |
| Original Song | Best Lyricist |
| Mohamed Fuad - "Fas Jehumeh Neiy" - Loodhifa; Ibrahim Nifar - "Alathu Loabi" – Love Story; Mohamed Abdul Ghanee – Mihashin Furaana Dhandhen; Moosa Samau - "Thiya Moonah" – Mihashin Furaana Dhandhen; Abdul Hannan Moosa Didi - "Inthizaarey Othee" – Kuhveriakee Kaakuhey?; Shifa Thaufeeq - "Zuvaanaa Thiya Nan Hithugaa" – Fathis Handhuvaruge Feshun 3D | Mohamed Abdul Ghanee – Mihashin Furaana Dhandhen; Mohamed Abdul Ghanee - Loodhifa; Mohamed Abdul Ghanee – Love Story; Adam Haleem Adnan – Mihashin Furaana Dhandhen; Easa Shareef – Kuhveriakee Kaakuhey? |
| Best Playback Singer – Male | Best Playback Singer – Female |
| Mohamed Abdul Ghanee – "Loabivaa Ey" – Hiyy Yaara Dheefa; Moosa Samau - "Thiya Moonah" – Mihashin Furaana Dhandhen; Abdul Hannan Moosa Didi – "Inthizaarey" – Kuhveriakee Kaakuhey?; Ibrahim Zaid Ali – "Dheyshey Naa" – Hiyy Yaara Dheefa; Mohamed Abdul Ghanee – "Vejjey Fanaa" – Hiyy Yaara Dheefa | Shifa Thaufeeq – "Zuvaanaa Thiyanan" – Fathis Handhuvaruge Feshun 3D; Aishath Maain Rasheed – "Thiya Moonah" – Mihashin Furaana Dhandhen; Mariyam Ashfa – "Loabivaa Ey" - Hiyy Yaara Dheefa; Rafiyath Rameeza – "Beyvafaa" - Hiyy Yaara Dheefa; Shifa Thaufeeq – "Vamey Fun Khiyaalu" - Fathis Handhuvaruge Feshun 3D |

=== Technical awards ===
| Best Editing | Best Cinematography |
|---|---|
| Ali Musthafa – Sazaa; Ahmed Asim – Loodhifa; Ravee Farooq – Ingili; Mohamed Aksham, Abdul Faththaah – Love Story; Ali Shifau – Fathis Handhuvaruge Feshun 3D | Hussain Munawwar – Sazaa; Hussain Munawwar – Loodhifa; Hussain Munawwar – Ingili; Ibrahim Wisan – Love Story; Ibrahim Wisan – Fathis Handhuvaruge Feshun 3D |
| Best Screenplay (Original) | Best Background Music (Score) |
| Moomin Fuad – Loodhifa; Mahdi Ahmed – Ingili; Mahdi Ahmed – Sazaa; Ibrahim Waheed – Fathis Handhuvaruge Feshun 3D | Mohamed Ikram – Sazaa; Mohamed Ikram – Loodhifa; Ibrahim Nifar – Dhilakani; Mohamed Ikram – Hiyy Yaara Dheefa; Mohamed Fuad – Fathis Handhuvaruge Feshun 3D |
| Best Sound Editing | Best Sound Mixing |
| Haisham Shafeeq – Loodhifa; Mohamed Ikram – Ingili; Mohamed Ikram – Sazaa; Ali Musthafa – Dhilakani; Ali Shifau – Fathis Handhuvaruge Feshun 3D | Haisham Shafeeq – Loodhifa; Mohamed Ikram – Ingili; Mohamed Ikram – Sazaa; Ali Musthafa – Dhilakani; Ali Shifau – Fathis Handhuvaruge Feshun 3D |
| Best Art Direction | Best Choreography |
| Moomin Fuad, Hussain Munawwar, Ismail Rasheed – Loodhifa; Ravee Farooq, Mahdi Ahmed, Hussain Munawwar – Ingili; Abdul Faththaah – Love Story; Hussain Munawwar – Sazaa; Ali Shifau, Mohamed Ali – Fathis Handhuvaruge Feshun 3D | Ravee Farooq – Mihashin Furaana Dhandhen; Abdul Faththaah – Love Story; Abdul Faththaah – Love Story; Abdul Faththaah, Aishath Rishmy – Love Story |
| Best Costume Design | Best Makeup |
| Aminath Nasreena, Ahmed Saeed – Loodhifa; Ravee Farooq, Mahdi Ahmed – Ingili; Razeena Thaufeeq – Love Story; Hussain Munawwar – Sazaa; Ahmed Saeed Ismail Shafeeq, Yoosuf Shafeeu – Insaaf | Hassan Adam – Fathis Handhuvaruge Feshun 3D; Ravee Farooq, Hussain Muawwar – Ingili; Fathimath Azifa – Loodhifa; Hassan Adam – Love Story; Niuma Mohamed, Fathimath Azifa – Sazaa |
| Visual Effects | |
Ahmed Sinan – Fathis Handhuvaruge Feshun 3D; Ahmed Shiham – Loodhifa

== Most wins ==
- Loodhifa - 10
- Fathis Handhuvaruge Feshun 3D - 3

== See also ==
- Gaumee Film Awards
