= 4th Gaumee Film Awards =

- Date: 29 December 2007

Highlights
- Best Film: Vehey Vaarey Therein
- Most awards: Vehey Vaarey Therein (6)

The 4th Gaumee Film Awards ceremony honored the best Maldivian films released between 2003 and 2005. The ceremony was held on 29 December 2007.

== Winners and nominees ==
=== Main awards ===
Nominees were announced in November 2007.

| Best Film | Best Director |
|---|---|
| Vehey Vaarey Therein; Kalaayaanulaa; Zuleykha | Abdul Faththaah – Vehey Vaarey Therein; Fathimath Nahula – Kalaayaanulaa; Fathimath Nahula – Zuleykha |
| Best Actor | Best Actress |
| Yoosuf Shafeeu – Vehey Vaarey Therein; Yoosuf Shafeeu – Kalaayaanulaa; Yoosuf Shafeeu – Zuleykha; Ali Seezan – Dharinnahtakai; Mohamed Manik – Eynaa | Niuma Mohamed – Kalaayaanulaa; Mariyam Nisha – Zuleykha; Niuma Mohamed – Dharinnahtakai; Jamsheedha Ahmed – Vehey Vaarey Therein; Mariyam Nisha – Edhi Edhi Hoadheemey |
| Best Supporting Actor | Best Supporting Actress |
| Ali Seezan – Zuleykha; Ahmed Asim – Dharinnahtakai; Mohamed Manik – Zuleykha; Mohamed Shavin – Vehey Vaarey Therein; Ali Ahmed – Edhathuru | Sheela Najeeb – Zuleykha; Sheereen Abdul Wahid – Dharinnahtakai; Aishath Shiranee – Kalaayaanulaa; Khadheeja Ibrahim Didi – Vehey Vaarey Therein; Fathmath Neelam – Edhathuru |
| Best Child Artist | Best Story |
| Mariyam Enash Sinan – Zuleykha | Fathimath Nahula – Zuleykha |
| Best Original Song | Best Lyricist |
| Mohamed Ikram - Dharinnahtakai | Mohamed Rasheed - "Ossifavaa Iru Eree Ey" - Edhi Edhi Hoadheemey |
| Best Playback Singer – Male | Best Playback Singer – Female |
| Abdul Hannan Moosa Didi - "Ossifavaa Iru Eree Ey" - Edhi Edhi Hoadheemey | Shifa Thaufeeq - "Ossifavaa Iru Eree Ey" - Edhi Edhi Hoadheemey |

=== Technical awards ===
| Best Editing | Best Cinematography |
|---|---|
| Sadha Ahmed – Kalaayaanulaa | Ibrahim Moosa, Hassan Haleem – Eynaa |
| Best Screenplay | Best Background Music |
| Abdul Faththaah – Vehey Vaarey Therein | Ayyuman Shareef – Edhathuru |
| Best Sound | Best Choreography |
| Mohamed Amsad – Edhathuru | Suneetha Ali, Ravee Farooq - Kalaayaanulaa |
| Best Costume Design | Best Makeup |
| Jadhulla Ismail, Laila – Zuleykha | Abdul Faththaah – Vehey Vaarey Therein |
Best Art Direction
Abdul Faththaah – Vehey Vaarey Therein

=== Short film ===
| Best Film | Best Director |
|---|---|
| Falhi Sikunthu | Ravee Farooq – Falhi Sikunthu 2 |
Best Actor
Ahmed Shaz – Falhi Sikunthu 1

== See also ==
- Gaumee Film Awards
