= Edhonveli Thundi =

- Official film poster
- Directed by: Yoosuf Shafeeu
- Written by: Yoosuf Shafeeu
- Screenplay by: Yoosuf Shafeeu
- Produced by: Yoosuf Shafeeu; Hassan Adam
- Starring: Yoosuf Shafeeu; Ali Riyaz; Fathimath Fareela
- Cinematography: Ibrahim Moosa
- Edited by: Yoosuf Shafeeu
- Music by: Ibrahim Nifar
- Production company: Eupe Production
- Release dates: October 11, 2007 (Part one); March 25, 2008 (Part two)
- Running time: 52 minutes (Part one); 55 minutes (Part two)
- Country: Maldives
- Language: Dhivehi

Edhonveli Thundi is a 2007 Maldivian two-part horror short-film written and directed by Yoosuf Shafeeu. Co-produced by Shafeeu and Hassan Adam under Eupe Production, the film stars Shafeeu, Ali Riyaz and Fathimath Fareela in pivotal roles.

== Premise ==
=== Part one ===
Ali (Ali Riyaz), a naturalist and the helpless younger brother of a blind man, Yoosuf Shafeeu spends most of his time at the beach, enjoying the nature. One day, he finds a beautiful shell near the seashore and equates himself with the shell for its "dead nature". He further confesses that if the shell has any element alive in it, he is desperate to marry the shell even, unbeknownst to him that a spirit is residing in the shell. The following day he wakes up to a female sobbing sound which was echoed again through the same shell, that evening. Followed by the curiosity, he brings the shell to his home. The voice, who believes to be married to Ali, communicates to him and begs to help her.

=== Part two ===
On the fourteenth night of an ecclesiastical lunar month, Ali witnesses the real form of the woman (Fathimath Fareela) trapped in the shell. Astonished by her beauty, Ali promises to help her and seeks help from an exorcist, Hussain (Ahmed Shahid). His rescue mission takes an unexpected turn when Ali discovers the involvement of his brother.

== Cast ==
- Yoosuf Shafeeu as Ali's brother
- Ali Riyaz as Ali
- Fathimath Fareela
- Mariyam Shahuza as Shahu
- Moosa Nazeem as Moosa
- Ahmed Shahid as Hussain
- Azhar
- Saalim as Jameel

== Soundtrack ==
Track listing
No.	Title	Singer(s)	Length
1.	"Thundi Mathi Naamaan"	Mohamed Abdul Ghanee

== Accolades ==
Year	Award	Category	Recipients	Result	Ref.
2008	5th Gaumee Film Awards	Best Film - Short Film	Edhonveli Thundi - Part 1	Won	
2008	5th Gaumee Film Awards	Best Director - Short Film	Yoosuf Shafeeu - Edhonveli Thundi - Part 1	Won	
