= Gaumee Film Award for Best Supporting Actress =

Gaumee Film Award

- Awarded for: Best Supporting Actress
- Country: Maldives
- Presented by: National Centre for the Arts

The Gaumee Film Award for Best Supporting Actress is given as part of the Gaumee Film Awards for Maldivian Films.

The award was first given in 1994. Here is a list of the award winners and the nominees of the respective award ceremonies.

== Winners and nominees ==
Year	Photos of winners	Actor	Film	Ref(s)
1st (1995)		Aishath Shiranee	Kulunu	
1st (1995)		No Other Nominee		
2nd (1997)	Not Available			
3rd (2007)		Arifa Ibrahim	Ainbehge Loabi Firiehge Vaajib	
3rd (2007)		No Other Nominee		
4th (2007)		Sheela Najeeb	Zuleykha	
4th (2007)		Aishath Shiranee	Kalaayaanulaa	
4th (2007)		Fathmath Neelam	Edhathuru	
4th (2007)		Khadheeja Ibrahim Didi	Vehey Vaarey Therein	
4th (2007)		Sheereen Abdul Wahid	Dharinnahtakai	
5th (2008)		Fathimath Fareela	Vaaloabi Engeynama	
5th (2008)		Fauziyya Hassan	Vaaloabi Engeynama	
5th (2008)		Mariyam Azza	Hukuru Vileyrey	
5th (2008)		Sheela Najeeb	Hithuge Edhun	
5th (2008)		Zeenath Abbas	Hukuru Vileyrey	
6th (2015)		Aishath Rishmy	Fanaa	
6th (2015)		Aminath Rasheedha	Niuma	
6th (2015)		Aminath Samiyya	Veeraana	
6th (2015)		Sheela Najeeb	Heyonuvaane	
6th (2015)		Sheela Najeeb	Niuma	
7th (2016)		Fathimath Azifa	Loodhifa	
7th (2016)		Aishath Rishmy	Hiyy Yaara Dheefa	
7th (2016)		Aishath Rishmy	Love Story	
7th (2016)		Khadheeja Ibrahim Didi	Loodhifa	
7th (2016)		Sheela Najeeb	Zaharu	
8th (2017)		Zeenath Abbas	Ahsham	
8th (2017)		Amira Ismail	Aadheys	
8th (2017)		Fathimath Azifa	Aadheys	
8th (2017)		Niuma Mohamed	Aniyaa	
8th (2017)		Zeenath Abbas	Vee Beyvafa	
9th (2019)		Khadheeja Ibrahim Didi	Vakin Loabin	
9th (2019)		Fathimath Azifa	Dhevansoora	
9th (2019)		Fathimath Azifa	Bos	
9th (2019)		Fauziyya Hassan	Hahdhu	
9th (2019)		Nuzuhath Shuaib	Vakin Loabin	

== See also ==
- Gaumee Film Awards
