= Vishka (film) =

- Official film poster
- Directed by: Ravee Farooq
- Screenplay by: Mahdi Ahmed
- Story by: Abdulla Wisham
- Produced by: Aishath Rishmy
- Starring: Aishath Rishmy; Ravee Farooq; Ahmed Saeed
- Cinematography: Shamin Nizam
- Edited by: Ravee Farooq
- Production company: Yaaraa Productions
- Distributed by: Schwak Cinema
- Release date: March 8, 2017
- Running time: 130 minutes
- Country: Maldives
- Language: Dhivehi

Vishka is a 2017 Maldivian crime film directed by Ravee Farooq. Produced by Aishath Rishmy under Yaaraa Productions, the film stars Farooq, Rishmy and Ahmed Saeed in pivotal roles. The film was released on 8 May 2017.

== Cast ==
- Aishath Rishmy as Vishka / Raisha
- Ravee Farooq as Ishan
- Ahmed Saeed as Manik
- Mohamed Waheed as Hameed
- Ali Nadheeh as Yaatte
- Ali Mufeed as Zarre
- Ahmed Fauzan Fauzy as Reehan
- Ibrahim Fiznan as Retey
- Hawwa Nisha as Reema
- Ahmed Aman as Janah
- Mariyam Shahuza as Zeenath
- Mohamed Ziyad as Shaheem Ali

== Development ==
Requested by producer Aishath Rishmy, the story for the film was written by Abdulla Wisham, while the screenplay was written by Mahdi Ahmed. The first draft of the screenplay was completed in 2013, though it was re-written and revised more than 10 times before the screenplay was finalised in 2015. Pre-production of the film was completed in two months time. Madhoship was hired for all the technical works, while Hussain Anees was hired as the make-up artist of the film, marking their first film to do the technical works and make-up respectively. Several new faces will be making debut with the film in supporting roles. Noora Rasheedh worked as the stylist in the film, who chose and arranged all outfits, while Riffath designed and custom tailored some of the outfits for the lead character. Vmedia was appointed as the media partner of the film.

== Soundtrack ==
No.	Title	Lyrics	Music	Singer(s)	Length
1.	"Aadhey Miadhu Dhaan" (Promotional song)	Mohamed Abdul Ghanee, Ahmed Amir	Ibrahim Nifar	Ravee Farooq, Mariyam Rifqa	6:27
2.	"Loaiybekey"	Fatho		Fatho
3.	"Kastholhu" (Male)	Mohamed Abdul Ghanee	Ibrahim Shiyam	Ravee Farooq
4.	"Kastholhu" (Female)	Mohamed Abdul Ghanee	Ibrahim Shiyam	Mariyam Rifqa
5.	"Mohoru"			Eman's Conspiracy
6.	"Vishka"	Soppe, Jai	Ismail Adheel	Soppe, Mariyam Rifqa, Ravee Farooq

== Release ==
On 30 May 2016, Yaaraa Productions announced the film and revealed their first look poster and teaser of the trailer to the media. The film was slated for release at Olympus along with Schwack Cinema. The first look of the film garnered a positive hype to the film. The media compared its first look with that of AR Murugadoss-directed Akira's first look which features Sonakshi Sinha, for having a similar design and style, though it was revealed on 20 June 2016.

== Reception ==
The teaser of the film was met with positive response from the critics. Ahmed Nadheem from Avas wrote: "This 43 seconds created more suspense than any other Dhivehi films released this year".

== Accolades ==
Award	Category	Recipient(s) and nominee(s)	Result	Ref(s)
7th SAARC Film Festival	Best Actress	Aishath Rishmy	Won	
9th Gaumee Film Awards	Best film	Vishka	Won	
9th Gaumee Film Awards	Best Director	Ravee Farooq	Nominated	
9th Gaumee Film Awards	Best Actor	Ravee Farooq	Nominated	
9th Gaumee Film Awards	Best Actress	Aishath Rishmy	Won	
9th Gaumee Film Awards	Best Supporting Actor	Ahmed Saeed	Nominated	
9th Gaumee Film Awards	Original Song	Ismail Adheel and Mohamed Abdul Ghanee for "Vishka"	Nominated	
9th Gaumee Film Awards	Best Lyricist	Abdulla Jailam Wajeeh for "Vishka"	Nominated	
9th Gaumee Film Awards	Best Female Playback Singer	Mariyam Rifqa Rasheed for "Vishka"	Won	
9th Gaumee Film Awards	Best Editing	Ravee Farooq	Nominated	
9th Gaumee Film Awards	Best Cinematography	Ahmed Shamin Nizam	Won	
9th Gaumee Film Awards	Best Screenplay	Mahdi Ahmed	Nominated	
9th Gaumee Film Awards	Best Background Music	Mohamed Ikram	Nominated	
9th Gaumee Film Awards	Best Art Direction	Ahmed Mohamed Imad	Won	
9th Gaumee Film Awards	Best Costume Design	Abdulla Wisham, Aminath Noora, Mohamed Riffath	Won	
9th Gaumee Film Awards	Best Sound Editing	Mohamed Ikram	Won	
