= Gaumee Film Award for Best Original Song =

Gaumee Film Award

- Awarded for: Best Original Song
- Country: Maldives
- Presented by: National Centre for the Arts

The Gaumee Film Award for Best Original Song is given as part of the Gaumee Film Awards for Maldivian Films.

The award was first given in 1994. Here is a list of the award winners and the nominees of the respective award ceremonies.

== Winners and nominees ==
Year	Photos of winners	Music composer	Film and song	Ref(s)
1st (1995)		Dadli Jayawardana	"Heeveyey Kalaa Dhekefaa" – Jazubaathu	
1st (1995)		No Other Nominee		
2nd (1997)	Not Available			
3rd (2007)	Not Available			
4th (2007)		Mohamed Ikram	"Dhaan Hingaa" – Dharinnahtakai	
4th (2007)		No Other Nominee		
5th (2008)		Ibrahim Nifar	"Vaaloabi Engeynama" - Vaaloabi Engeynama	
5th (2008)		No Other Nominee		
6th (2015)		Shifa Thaufeeq, Ayyuman Shareef	"Bunaa Hiyy Vey" - Zalzalaa En'buri Aun	
6th (2015)		Shifa Thaufeeq, Ayyuman Shareef	"Aadhey Aadhey" - Zalzalaa En'buri Aun	
6th (2015)		Shifa Thaufeeq, Ayyuman Shareef	"Aadhey Araamu" - Zalzalaa En'buri Aun	
6th (2015)		Hussain Sobah, Ahmed Falah	"Hiyy Rohvaanulaa" - Hiyy Rohvaanulaa	
6th (2015)		Mohamed Fuad	"Araam" - Happy Birthday	
7th (2016)		Mohamed Fuad	"Fas Jehumeh Neiy" – Loodhifa	
7th (2016)		Ibrahim Nifar	"Alathu Loabi" – Love Story	
7th (2016)		Mohamed Abdul Ghanee	"Neyngey Bunaakah" – Mihashin Furaana Dhandhen	
7th (2016)		Moosa Samau	"Thiya Moonah" – Mihashin Furaana Dhandhen	
7th (2016)		Abdul Hannan Moosa Didi	"Inthizaarey Othee" – Kuhveriakee Kaakuhey?	
7th (2016)		Shifa Thaufeeq	"Zuvaanaa Thiya Nan Hithugaa" – Fathis Handhuvaruge Feshun 3D	
8th (2017)		Mohamed Ikram	"Forever in Love" - 24 Gadi Iru	
8th (2017)		Detune Band	"Noon Noon Nudhey" - Vaashey Mashaa Ekee	
8th (2017)		Ibrahim Zaid Ali	"Vaa Loabi Dhulun" - Vafaatheri Kehiveriya	
8th (2017)		Ibrahim Zaid Ali	"Gandhee Huvaa" - Ahsham	
8th (2017)		Shammoon Mohamed	"Gellifa" - Emme Fahu Vindha Jehendhen	
9th (2019)		Fathuhulla Abdul Fatthah	"Hiyy Avas Vaa Goiy" - Bos	
9th (2019)		Ibrahim Shiham	"Dhuaa" - Hahdhu	
9th (2019)		Fathuhulla Shakeel	"Dhin Ufaa" - Dhevansoora	
9th (2019)		Ismail Adheel, Mohamed Abdul Ghanee	"Vishka" - Vishka	
9th (2019)		Shammoon Mohamed	"Dhuniye Dhauruve" - Vakin Loabin	

== See also ==
- Gaumee Film Awards
