= 14 Vileyrey =

- Official film poster
- Directed by: Abdul Faththaah
- Written by: Ibrahim Waheed
- Produced by: Ahmed Sharan Hassan
- Starring: Ali Seezan; Mariyam Nisha; Aishath Rishmy
- Cinematography: Ibrahim Wisan
- Edited by: Abdul Faththaah
- Music by: Ayyuman Shareef
- Production company: Dash Studio
- Release date: June 27, 2011
- Country: Maldives
- Language: Dhivehi

14 Vileyrey (English: fourteenth night) is a 2011 Maldivian romantic horror film directed by Abdul Faththaah. Produced by Hassan under Dash Studio, the film stars Ali Seezan, Mariyam Nisha and Aishath Rishmy in pivotal roles. The film was released on 27 June 2011. Upon release, the film received mixed response from critics, did good business at box office and was ultimately declared a "Hit".

== Cast ==
- Ali Seezan
- Mariyam Nisha
- Aishath Rishmy as Nazima
- Fauziyya Hassan
- Arifa Ibrahim
- Roanu Hassan Manik

== Development ==
Abdul Faththaah assigned Ibrahim Waheed to write the story and script for the film in 2010. Initially Fatthah, wanted the story to involve a ghost and a spirit, though Waheed and Fatthah later came to a conclusion to omit the involvement of ghost in script since "its a challenge to incorporate both ghost and spirit simultaneously". The project faced controversy when the team of Kuhveriakee Kaakuhey? accuses Fatthah for "purloining their plot" which also features Aishath Rishmy.

== Soundtrack ==
Track listing
No.	Title	Lyrics	Singer(s)	Length
1.	"Thaureef"	Mohamed Abdul Ghanee	Mohamed Abdul Ghanee, Mariyam Ashfa	5:02
2.	"Saadhavileyrey"	Mohamed Abdul Ghanee	Ibrahim Zaid Ali	3:51
3.	"Loabeegaa" (Male version)	Mohamed Abdul Ghanee	Mohamed Abdul Ghanee	4:36
4.	"Loabeegaa" (Female version)	Mohamed Abdul Ghanee	Shifa Thaufeeq	4:38
5.	"Loabin Nuhanu"	Ismail Mubarik	Hassan Ilham	5:09
6.	"Ossey Handhey"	Ismail Mubarik	Hassan Ilham, Shifa Thaufeeq	5:15

== Accolades ==
Award	Category	Recipients	Result	Ref.
2nd Maldives Film Awards	Best Supporting Actress	Aishath Rishmy	Nominated	
2nd Maldives Film Awards	Best Female Playback Singer	Shifa Thaufeeq for "Loabeegaa"	Won	
