= Love Story (2012 film) =

- Official film poster
- Directed by: Abdul Faththaah
- Written by: Ibrahim Waheed
- Screenplay by: Ibrahim Waheed; Abdul Faththaah
- Produced by: [Ali Shaniz Mohamed & Noor]
- Starring: Ali Seezan; Amira Ismail; Aishath Rishmy
- Cinematography: Ibrahim Wisan
- Edited by: Mohamed Aksham; Abdul Faththaah
- Music by: Ibrahim Nifar
- Production companies: Saturn Studio & Noor N Movies
- Release date: February 28, 2012
- Country: Maldives
- Language: Dhivehi

Love Story is a 2012 Maldivian romantic film directed by Abdul Faththaah. Produced by Ali Shaniz Mohamed and Hussain Nooradeen under Saturn Studio and Noor N Movies, the film stars Ali Seezan, Amira Ismail and Aishath Rishmy in pivotal roles. The film was released on 28 March 2012.

== Cast ==
- Ali Seezan as Ahmed Althaf Shair
- Amira Ismail as Rishfa
- Aishath Rishmy as Hana
- Roanu Hassan Manik as Ahammad
- Mohamed Faisal as Niyaz
- Mohamed Manik as Zahid
- Sheela Najeeb as Afiya
- Ali Shameel as Rishfa's father
- Ahmed Saeed as Iqbal; Althaf's brother
- Aminath Shareef as Hana's mother
- Ismail Zahir (special appearance)
- Khadheeja Ibrahim Didi as a nurse (special appearance)

== Soundtrack ==
Track listing
No.	Title	Lyrics	Singer(s)	Length
1.	"Heyverikan Nethi Dhanee"		Ibrahim Zaid Ali, Aishath Maain Rasheed
2.	"Inthihaa Loabivey"		Mohamed Abdul Ghanee
3.	"Mijehey Vaigaa"	Shammoon Mohamed	Mira Mohamed Majid, Shammoon Mohamed
4.	"Saahibaa Ey Magey"	Mohamed Abdul Ghanee	Ibrahim Yafiu, Mariyam Ashfa
5.	"Vaa Loabinney"	Mohamed Abdul Ghanee	Ibrahim Zaid Ali
6.	"Alathu Loabi"	Mohamed Abdul Ghanee	Mariyam Ashfa, Mohamed Abdul Ghanee

== Release and reception ==
The film received negative response from critics. Ahmed Nadheem of Haveeru noted the film as "another boring, slow paced" Maldivian film which lacks originality. Displeased with the screenplay and performance of the film, he wrote: "None of the actors were given scope to build their characters and none was able to justify their character. With excessive emotional scenes, actors were exposed to over-acting and nothing more". The cinematography of few songs were noted to be the only saving grace of the film.

== Accolades ==
Award	Category	Recipients	Result	Ref.
3rd Maldives Film Awards	Best Supporting Actress	Aishath Rishmy	Nominated	
3rd Maldives Film Awards	Best Male Debut	Hussain Shahid	Nominated	
3rd Maldives Film Awards	Best Cinematography	Ibrahim Wisan	Nominated	
3rd Maldives Film Awards	Best Female Playback Singer	Mira Mohamed Majid	Won	
3rd Maldives Film Awards	Best Choreography	Abdul Faththaah	Won	
7th Gaumee Film Awards	Best Film	Love Story	Nominated	
7th Gaumee Film Awards	Best Director	Abdul Faththaah	Nominated	
7th Gaumee Film Awards	Best Actress	Amira Ismail	Nominated	
7th Gaumee Film Awards	Best Supporting Actress	Aishath Rishmy	Nominated	
7th Gaumee Film Awards	Best Original Song	Ibrahim Nifar	Nominated	
7th Gaumee Film Awards	Best Lyricist	Mohamed Abdul Ghanee	Nominated	
7th Gaumee Film Awards	Best Editing	Mohamed Aksham and Abdul Faththaah	Nominated	
7th Gaumee Film Awards	Best Cinematography	Ibrahim Wisan	Nominated	
7th Gaumee Film Awards	Best Art Direction	Abdul Faththaah	Nominated	
7th Gaumee Film Awards	Best Choreography	Abdul Faththaah	Nominated	
7th Gaumee Film Awards	Best Choreography	Abdul Faththaah	Nominated	
7th Gaumee Film Awards	Best Choreography	Abdul Faththaah and Aishath Rishmy	Nominated	
7th Gaumee Film Awards	Best Costume Design	Razeena Thaufeeq	Nominated	
7th Gaumee Film Awards	Best Makeup	Hassan Adam	Nominated	
