= Ibrahim Wisan =

Maldivian actor and cinematographer

- Born: 27 February 1977 (age 49); Malé, Maldives
- Occupations: Cinematographer, actor, director
- Years active: 1996–present

Ibrahim Wisan (born 27 February 1977), nicknamed as Kandi, is a Maldivian cinematographer, actor, and director.

== Career ==
In 1996, Wisan starred in Mohamed Rasheed's Hifehettumeh Neiy Karuna opposite Niuma Mohamed, Abdul Raheem and Arifa Ibrahim. He again collaborated with Arifa Ibrahim for her drama film Dhauvaa, an unofficial remake of Deepak Sareen's Bollywood film Aaina (1993), where he reprised the role played by Deepak Tijori in the original. After working as a cinematographer in Easa Shareef's horror classic Fathis Handhuvaru (1997), Wisan was offered the role behind camera for several other films.

In 2000, he appeared in year's most successful Maldivian film, Ahmed Nimal's horror classic Zalzalaa (2000) where Wisan portrays the character Ahmed Zameel, a divorcee who gets trapped in the path of a female spirit assigned to complete an unfulfilled prophecy.

The following year he worked with Aishath Ali Manik for Hiiy Edhenee (2001) which was an unofficial remake of Dharmesh Darshan's romantic film Dhadkan (2000) where he reprised the role played by Parmeet Sethi in the original, the wicked step-brother. He next starred alongside Ali Seezan, Mariyam Nazima and Yoosuf Shafeeu in Mohamed Rasheed's Hithu Vindhu (2002) while working as the cinematographer of the film.

Wisan collaborated with Easa Shareef for the horror film Ginihila (2003) alongside Ali Seezan, Niuma Mohamed, Mariyam Nisha and Reeko Moosa Manik, playing the role of a supportive friend. The film narrates the story of a young couple who decided to spend a romantic break to save their crumbling marriage and how events take a sinister turn when the wife experiences a supernatural incidence which has her husband's involvement in it. The film is an unofficial remake of Vikram Bhatt's Indian horror film Raaz (2002) which itself is an unofficial adaptation of What Lies Beneath. The same year, he worked with Amjad Ibrahim for his romantic horror film Dhonkamana (2003) which narrates the romantic relationship between a young man and an old woman. Featuring Fauziyya Hassan, Yoosuf Shafeeu, Sheela Najeeb, Niuma Mohamed, Sheereen Abdul Wahid and Amira Ismail, the film received mainly negative reviews from critics though its portrayal of the relationship between a couple with a large age difference was praised.

In 2005, Wisan collaborated with Abdul Faththaah for his romantic disaster film, Hureemey Inthizaarugaa (2005) cast along with Ravee Farooq, Mariyam Zuhura, Waleedha Waleed, Ibrahim Jihad and Neena Saleem. The film, heavily relied on the effect of the 2004 Indian Ocean earthquake on the Maldives, received favorable reviews from critics though it failed to perform financially.

In 2016, Wisan released his debut direction, Vee Beyvafa, a melodrama which was shot in 2011 and delayed in post-production. The film received negative responses from critics, with Ahmed Adhushan of Mihaaru calling it "a step backward" in the progress of cinema.

== Filmography ==
=== Feature film ===
Year	Title	Role	Notes	Ref(s)
1996	Hifehettumeh Neiy Karuna	Javid		
1996	Edhuvas Hingajje	Vishan		
1997	Heelaiy	Young Shah Naseer		
1998	Dhauvaa	Ayaz		
2000	Zalzalaa	Ahmed Zameel		
2001	Hiiy Edhenee	Afey		
2002	Hithu Vindhu	Rilwan		
2003	Ginihila	Mifzal's friend		
2003	Dhonkamana	Shakeeb		
2005	Hureemey Inthizaarugaa	Company staff	Special appearance	
2006	Vaaloabi Engeynama	Cameraman	Special appearance	
2010	Dhin Veynuge Hithaamaigaa	Himself	Special appearance in the song "Annaashey Hinithun Velamaa"	
2013	Fathis Handhuvaruge Feshun 3D	Badheeu	Special appearance	
2019	Leena	Zuhoor's friend		

=== Television ===
Year	Title	Role	Notes	Ref(s)
2003	Dheewanaa Hiyy	Doctor	Guest role; "Episode 5"	
2003–2005	Thiyey Mihithuge Vindhakee	Dr. Nadheem	Recurring role; 5 episodes	

=== Short film ===
Year	Title	Role	Notes	Ref(s)
1996	Kolhukehi	Himself		
2006	Ereyge Fahun	Dr. Munawwar		
2006	Handi Ganduvaru Dhonkamana	Director Spielberg		
2006	Kiss Jazbaath	Afnan		
2007	Handi Ganduvaru Dhonkamana 2½	Director Spielberg		
2007	Paneeno	Ahmed		

=== Other work ===
Year	Title	Director	Camera	Screenplay	Notes	Ref(s)
1997	Fathis Handhuvaru		Yes		Feature film	
1999	Sababu		Yes		Feature film	
2000	Saahibaa		Yes		Feature film	
2000	Zalzalaa		Yes		Feature film	
2002	Hithu Vindhu		Yes		Feature film	
2003	Ginihila		Yes		Feature film	
2003	Dhonkamana		Yes		Feature film	
2004	Hatharu Udhares		Yes		Feature film	
2006–2008	Hinithun Velaashey Kalaa		Yes		52 episodes	
2006	Ereyge Fahun		Yes		Short film	
2006	Kudafoolhuge Vasvaas		Yes		Short film	
2006–2008	Kiss Jazbaath		Yes		Short film	
2007	Nudhaashe Dhookohfaa Loabivaa		Yes		Short film	
2007	Fahu Sofha		Yes		Short film	
2007	Paneeno	Yes	Yes	Yes	Short film	
2008	E Sirru		Yes		Short film	
2008	The Boat	Yes			Short film; co-directed with Ahmed Ziya	
2009	Hiyy Rohvaanulaa		Yes		Feature film	
2009	Karuna Vee Beyvafa		Yes		Feature film	
2009	Pink Fairy	Yes	Yes		Short film	
2009	Lhakoe	Yes	Yes		Short film	
2009	Dhekunu Huvafen	Yes	Yes		Short film	
2009	Mihithah Loabi Dheyshey		Yes		Television series	
2010	Jinni		Yes		Feature film	
2010	Maafeh Neiy		Yes		Feature film	
2010	Nu Ufan Dhari	Yes	Yes		Short film	
2010	Kudafoolhu	Yes	Yes	Yes	Short film	
2011	Hithey Dheymee		Yes		Feature film	
2011	14 Vileyrey		Yes		Feature film	
2011	Hiyy Yaara Dheefa		Yes		Feature film	
2011	Insaaf		Yes		Feature film	
2011	Furaana Dheynan		Yes		Television series; 4 episodes	
2012	Mihashin Furaana Dhandhen		Yes		Feature film	
2012	Love Story		Yes		Feature film	
2013	Farihibe 4		Yes		Short film	
2013	Fathis Handhuvaruge Feshun 3D		Yes		Feature film	
2016	Vafaatheri Kehiveriya		Yes		Feature film	
2016	Vee Beyvafa	Yes			Feature film	
2017	Hahdhu		Yes		Feature film	
2017	Neydhen Vakivaakah		Yes		Feature film	
2019	Leena		Yes		Feature film	
2019	Bavathi		Yes		Feature film	
2021	Maryam	Yes	Yes		Feature film	
2021	Girlfriends	Yes			Web series; 12 episodes	
2022	Gudhan	Yes			Web series; 12 episodes	
2023	Beeveema		Yes		Feature film	
2023	Nina		Yes		Feature film	
2025	Abadhah		Yes		Feature film	
2025	Kan'bulo		Yes		Feature film	
2025	Koss Gina Mistake		Yes		Feature film	
2025	Ilzaam		Yes		Feature film	

== Accolades ==
Year	Award	Category	Nominated work	Result	Ref(s)
2011	1st Maldives Film Awards	Best Cinematography	Jinni	Won	
2014	3rd Maldives Film Awards	Best Cinematography	Love Story	Nominated	
2014	3rd Maldives Film Awards	Best Cinematography - Short film	Siyaasee Koalhun	Won	
2014	3rd Maldives Film Awards	Best Cinematography - Short film	Farihibe 4	Nominated	
2016	7th Gaumee Film Awards	Best Cinematography	Love Story	Nominated	
2016	7th Gaumee Film Awards	Best Cinematography	Fathis Handhuvaruge Feshun 3D	Nominated	
2017	8th Gaumee Film Awards	Best Art Direction	Ahsham (Shared with Ali Seezan)	Nominated	
2017	8th Gaumee Film Awards	Best Sound Editing	Insaana (Shared with Ali Seezan)	Nominated	
2017	8th Gaumee Film Awards	Best Cinematography - Short film	Farihibe 4	Nominated	
2019	9th Gaumee Film Awards	Best Cinematography	Hahdhu	Nominated	
