= Gaumee Film Award for Best Supporting Actor =

Gaumee Film Award

- Awarded for: Best Supporting Actor
- Country: Maldives
- Presented by: National Centre for the Arts

The Gaumee Film Award for Best Supporting Actor is given as part of the Gaumee Film Awards for Maldivian Films.

The award was first given in 1995. Here is a list of the award winners and the nominees of the respective award ceremonies.

== Winners and nominees ==
Year	Photos of winners	Actor	Film	Ref(s)
1st (1995)		Reeko Moosa Manik	Ihsaas	
1st (1995)		No Other Nominee		
2nd (1997)	Not Available			
3rd (2007)		Abdul Sattar	Amaanaaiy	
3rd (2007)		No Other Nominee		
4th (2007)		Ali Seezan	Zuleykha	
4th (2007)		Ahmed Asim	Dharinnahtakai	
4th (2007)		Ali Ahmed	Edhathuru	
4th (2007)		Mohamed Manik	Zuleykha	
4th (2007)		Mohamed Shavin	Vehey Vaarey Therein	
5th (2008)		Ismail Rasheed	Heylaa	
5th (2008)		Ali Riyaz	Vaaloabi Engeynama	
5th (2008)		Lufshan Shakeeb	Hiyani	
5th (2008)		Lufshan Shakeeb	Heylaa	
5th (2008)		Yoosuf Shafeeu	Vasvaas	
6th (2015)		Abdulla Muaz	Niuma	
6th (2015)		Ahmed Lais Asim	Yoosuf	
6th (2015)		Ahmed Nimal	Yoosuf	
6th (2015)		Ali Seezan	Dhin Veynuge Hithaamaigaa	
6th (2015)		Mohamed Manik	Zalzalaa En'buri Aun	
7th (2016)		Ravee Farooq	Loodhifa	
7th (2016)		Abdulla Muaz	Ingili	
7th (2016)		Ahmed Nimal	Mihashin Furaana Dhandhen	
7th (2016)		Ismail Rasheed	Sazaa	
7th (2016)		Roanu Hassan Manik	Mihashin Furaana Dhandhen	
8th (2017)		Ahmed Saeed	Ahsham	
8th (2017)		Adam Rizwee	Vaashey Mashaa Ekee	
8th (2017)		Ismail Rasheed	Aniyaa	
8th (2017)		Mohamed Faisal	Vaashey Mashaa Ekee	
8th (2017)		Ravee Farooq	Hulhudhaan	
9th (2019)		Ali Azim	Hahdhu	
9th (2019)		Ahmed Saeed	Vishka	
9th (2019)		Ali Azim	Dhevansoora	
9th (2019)		Ibrahim Jihad	Bos	
9th (2019)		Ibrahim Jihad	Dhevansoora	

== See also ==
- Gaumee Film Awards
