= Gaumee Film Award for Best Actress =

Gaumee Film Award

- Awarded for: Best Actress
- Country: Maldives
- Presented by: National Centre for the Arts

The Gaumee Film Award for Best Actress is given as part of the Gaumee Film Awards for Maldivian Films.

The award was first given in 1995. Here is a list of the award winners and the nominees of the respective award ceremonies.

== Superlatives ==
Superlative	Actor	Record
Actress with most awards	Niuma Mohamed; Mariyam Afeefa	2
Actress with most nominations	Niuma Mohamed	11
Actress with most nominations in a single year	Niuma Mohamed	3 (6th award)
Actress with most consecutive year nominations	Niuma Mohamed	6 (3rd–8th award)
Eldest winner	Niuma Mohamed (Niuma)	33
Eldest nominee	Aminath Rasheedha (Fanaa)	43
Youngest winner	Mariyam Nisha (Haqqu)	17
Youngest nominee	Mariyam Nisha (Haqqu)	17

== Winners and nominees ==
Year	Photos of winners	Actress	Film	Ref(s)
1st (1995)		Hawwa Zahira	Dheriyaa	
1st (1995)		Aishath Shiranee	Zakham	
2nd (1997)		Mariyam Nisha	Haqqu	
2nd (1997)		Aishath Shiranee	Fun Asaru	
3rd (2007)		Jamsheedha Ahmed	Amaanaaiy	
3rd (2007)		Niuma Mohamed	Fathis Handhuvaru	
3rd (2007)		Aishath Shiranee	Laila	
4th (2007)		Niuma Mohamed	Kalaayaanulaa	
4th (2007)		Jamsheedha Ahmed	Vehey Vaarey Therein	
4th (2007)		Mariyam Nisha	Edhi Edhi Hoadheemey	
4th (2007)		Mariyam Nisha	Zuleykha	
4th (2007)		Niuma Mohamed	Dharinnahtakai	
5th (2008)		Mariyam Afeefa	Vaaloabi Engeynama	
5th (2008)		Aishath Rishmy	Hukuru Vileyrey	
5th (2008)		Niuma Mohamed	Hiyani	
5th (2008)		Niuma Mohamed	Hithuge Edhun	
5th (2008)		Zeenath Abbas	Heylaa	
6th (2015)		Niuma Mohamed	Niuma	
6th (2015)		Aminath Rasheedha	Fanaa	
6th (2015)		Niuma Mohamed	Hiyy Rohvaanulaa	
6th (2015)		Niuma Mohamed	Yoosuf	
6th (2015)		Sheela Najeeb	Zalzalaa En'buri Aun	
7th (2016)		Mariyam Afeefa	Loodhifa	
7th (2016)		Amira Ismail	Love Story	
7th (2016)		Fathimath Fareela	Fathis Handhuvaruge Feshun 3D	
7th (2016)		Niuma Mohamed	Mihashin Furaana Dhandhen	
7th (2016)		Niuma Mohamed	Sazaa	
8th (2017)		Mariyam Majudha	Vaashey Mashaa Ekee	
8th (2017)		Aishath Rishmy	Mikoe Bappa Baey Baey	
8th (2017)		Mariyam Majudha	Hulhudhaan	
8th (2017)		Mariyam Majudha	Emme Fahu Vindha Jehendhen	
8th (2017)		Niuma Mohamed	Aadheys	
9th (2019)		Aishath Rishmy	Vishka	
9th (2019)		Mariyam Azza	Hahdhu	
9th (2019)		Mariyam Azza	Mee Loaybakee	
9th (2019)		Mariyam Majudha	Vakin Loabin	
9th (2019)		Nuzuhath Shuaib	Malikaa	

== See also ==
- Gaumee Film Awards
