= Hukuru Vileyrey =

2006 Maldivian film

- Official film poster
- Directed by: Aishath Rishmy; Aminath Rasheedha
- Written by: Ibrahim Waheed
- Screenplay by: Ibrahim Waheed; Aishath Rishmy
- Produced by: Aminath Rasheedha
- Starring: Yoosuf Shafeeu; Aishath Rishmy; Zeenath Abbas; Mariyam Azza
- Cinematography: Hassan Haleem
- Edited by: Aishath Rishmy
- Music by: Ibrahim Nifar
- Production company: Yaaraa Productions
- Release date: March 8, 2006
- Running time: 198 minutes
- Country: Maldives
- Language: Dhivehi

Hukuru Vileyrey (transl. Friday night), is a 2006 Maldivian romantic horror film directed by Aishath Rishmy and Aminath Rasheedha. Produced by Rasheedha under Yaaraa Productions, the film stars Yoosuf Shafeeu, Aishath Rishmy, Mariyam Azza and Zeenath Abbas in pivotal roles.

The film was based on a novel published by Ibrahim Waheed in Haveeru Daily in 2003. The film was a critical and commercial success while being considered "one of the few acceptable horror movies the Maldives film industry has ever produced". The film was later released as a 15 episode television series with the inclusion of several clips that were cut from the cinema version.

== Premise ==
Fairooz (Yoosuf Shafeeu), an aspiring author is happily married to his amusing wife Nahidha (Mariyam Azza) and blessed with a daughter. He once decided to write a novel about his friend, Rasheed (Ahmed Saeed) who has been possessed since childhood. The evil spirit (Zeenath Abbas) was expulsed from Rasheed's soul, bewitching Fairooz during the process of exorcism. After this the sprit kept haunting Fairooz.

== Cast ==
- Yoosuf Shafeeu as Fairooz
- Aishath Rishmy as Nahidha
- Aminath Rasheedha as Fauziyya Shakir
- Zeenath Abbas as an evil spirit
- Mariyam Azza as Azza
- Ahmed Saeed as Rasheed
- Chilhiya Moosa Manik as Adam Manik
- Abdulla Muaz as Zaid
- Mariyam Shahuza as Yusra
- Mariyam Zuhura as Fazna
- Aishath Nashwa as Haifa
- Ahmed Shafeeu
- Aflah Shah
- Khalidha Adam
- Aminath Shareef (Special appearance)

== Soundtrack ==
Track listing
No.	Title	Lyrics	Music	Singer(s)	Length
1.	"Vaathi Fariloa"	Ahmed Nashidh (Dharavandhoo)	Hussain Sobah	Abdul Baaree, Mariyam Rifqa
2.	"Haadha Salhiyey"	Ahmed Nashidh (Dharavandhoo)	Hussain Sobah	Aishath Inaya
3.	"Huree Nazar"	Ahmed Nashidh (Dharavandhoo)	Muaviyath Anwar	Fazeela Amir

== Accolades ==
Year	Award	Category	Recipients	Result	Ref.
2008	5th Gaumee Film Awards	Best Actor	Yoosuf Shafeeu	Nominated	
2008	5th Gaumee Film Awards	Best Actress	Aishath Rishmy	Nominated	
2008	5th Gaumee Film Awards	Best Supporting Actress	Zeenath Abbas	Nominated	
2008	5th Gaumee Film Awards	Best Supporting Actress	Mariyam Azza	Nominated	
2008	5th Gaumee Film Awards	Best Visual Effects	Ahmed Shiyam, Hamid Ibrahim, Hassan Adam	Won	
2008	5th Gaumee Film Awards	Best Makeup	Hassan Adam, Fathimath Fareela	Won	
