= Kuhveriakee Kaakuhey? =

- Official film poster
- Directed by: Aishath Ali Manik
- Written by: Ulvy; Alice
- Screenplay by: Ulvy; Aishath Ali Manik
- Produced by: Abdul Hannan Moosa Didi
- Starring: Ahmed Azmeel; Aishath Rishmy; Sheereen Abdul Wahid
- Cinematography: Ali Rasheed
- Edited by: Ali Rasheed; Alice
- Music by: Abdul Hannan Moosa Didi
- Production company: UR3A Production
- Release date: May 17, 2011
- Country: Maldives
- Language: Dhivehi

Kuhveriakee Kaakuhey? is a 2011 Maldivian romantic horror film directed by Aishath Ali Manik. Produced by Abdul Hannan Moosa Didi under UR3A Production, the film stars Ahmed Azmeel, Aishath Rishmy and Sheereen Abdul Wahid in pivotal roles. The film was released on 17 May 2011. Upon release, the film received negative response from critics and was declared a flop at box office.

== Cast ==
- Ahmed Azmeel as Azeen
- Aishath Rishmy as Asha Ali
- Sheereen Abdul Wahid
- Aminath Rasheedha
- Ahmed Shah

== Development ==
The film was written in 2007 by producer Abdul Hannan Moosa Didi's two daughters Alice and Ulvy. Inspired by Ram Gopal Varma's Bollywood horror romantic thriller film Darling (2007), the film revolves around a man who cheats on his wife with his secretary, and how his life slides to a haunting shift when he accidentally kills his mistress. The project was handed over to Abdul Faththaah for the dubbing process, and accusation rose that Fatthah has allegedly "copied" the storyline for his next project 14 Vileyrey which also features Aishath Rishmy.

== Soundtrack ==
Track listing
No.	Title	Lyrics	Music	Singer(s)	Length
1.	"Nubune Keehhey Kuraanee"	Abdul Hannan Moosa Didi	Mohamed Ahmed (Kokko)	Abdul Hannan Moosa Didi	04:30
2.	"Khiyaalee Vaafashun"	Easa Shareef	Mohamed Ahmed (Kokko)	Abdul Hannan Moosa Didi, Fathimath Rauf	04:30
3.	"Nudhey Loabi Aisha"	Abdul Hannan Moosa Didi	Imaad Ismail	Abdul Hannan Moosa Didi	04:09
4.	"Inthizaarey Othee Hiyy Edheythee"	Easa Shareef	Imaad Ismail	Abdul Hannan Moosa Didi	05:01
5.	"Aharenves Loabivin" (Title Track)	Abdul Hannan Moosa Didi	Ayyuman Shareef	Abdul Hannan Moosa Didi, Shifa Thaufeeq	04:24
6.	"Nuruhifaa Dhuruga Dhen"	Abdul Hannan Moosa Didi	Shaaz Saeedh	Abdul Hannan Moosa Didi	05:15
7.	"Aharenves Loabivin" (Slow Version)	Abdul Hannan Moosa Didi	Ayyuman Shareef	Abdul Hannan Moosa Didi	00.54
8.	"Insaafeh Loabeegaa Nethey"	Easa Shareef	Mohamed Rasheedh (Monus)	Abdul Hannan Moosa Didi	04:32
Total length:					33:19

== Accolades ==
Award	Category	Recipients	Result	Ref.
7th Gaumee Film Awards	Best Original Song	Abdul Hannan Moosa Didi	Nominated	
7th Gaumee Film Awards	Best Lyricist	Easa Shareef - "Inthizaarey Othee Hiyy Edheythee"	Nominated	
7th Gaumee Film Awards	Best Male Playback Singer	Abdul Hannan Moosa Didi	Nominated	
