= Aishath Rishmy =

Maldivian actress and director

Aishath Rishmy Rameez
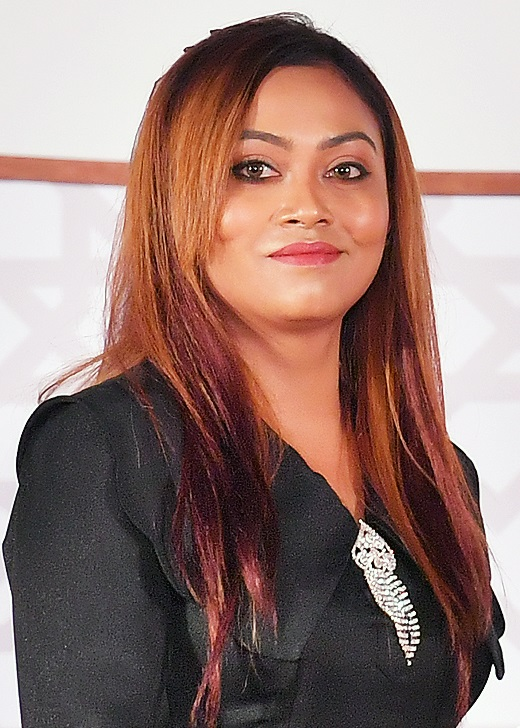
- Rishmy in 2019
- Born: 15 November 1985 (age 40); Male', Maldives
- Occupations: Actress; director; producer; editor; choreographer; screenwriter
- Years active: 2004–present
- Spouses: Ahmed Azmeel (m. 2007; div. 2013); Ravee Farooq (m. 2019; div. 2022)
- Children: 1
- Parent: Aminath Rasheedha (mother)

Aishath Rishmy Rameez (born 15 November 1985) is a Maldivian actress, film producer and director. She has established a career in Maldives Film Industry and is a recipient of several awards, including three Gaumee Film Awards, and two Maldives Film Awards. In 2019, the Government of Maldives acknowledged her exceptional achievements by honoring her with the National Award of Special Achievement, specifically recognizing her International Award for Best Actress.

Born in Male', Rishmy is the daughter of the renowned actress Aminath Rasheedha and is heavily inspired by her mother's significant contribution to the industry. After completing her education, Rishmy made her official screen debut in Yaaraa Productions' debut video song album Yaaraa, actively participating in the production process. She made her acting debut in 2006 with Hukuru Vileyrey, a film she also co-directed. Her performance fetched her a Gaumee Film Award nomination for Best Actress. She continued contributing to Maldivian cinema, co-directing and starring in Fanaa, which garnered her a Gaumee Film Award for Best Supporting Actress and nomination for the Best Director.

Apart from featuring in two horror films of similar synopsis, Kuhveriakee Kaakuhey? (2011) and 14 Vileyrey (2011), Rishmy worked in romantic dramas including Hiyy Yaara Dheefa and Love Story, both earning her nominations for Gaumee Film Award for Best Supporting Actress. However, it was her roles in psychological thrillers Insaana (2014), Mikoe Bappa Baey Baey (2015) and the crime thriller Vishka (2017) that marked a significant breakthrough in her career. The latter fetched her a Gaumee Film Award for Best Actress and the Best Actress award during SAARC Film Festival 2017; marking the first international accolade for an actress from Maldives.

Following the critical appreciation, Rishmy played a "carefree and bold" wife in the web series Ehenas, a tortured woman in the television anthology Ruqyah, a domestically abused wife in the web anthology series Vihaali and a magician in the horror thriller web series Biruveri Vaahaka. In 2023, she released her dream project Yaaraa, a fifty-episode romantic comedy web series.

== Early life ==
Born in Malé, Maldives, Rishmy is the daughter of actor Aminath Rasheedha. She is the elder sister of actress Mariyam Azza and together they reside in Vilingili since the early days when the island was designated as a satellite town of Male. Rishmy completed her secondary education from Aminiya School and pursued her higher education from Centre for Higher Secondary Education.

Rishmy made a brief cameo appearance in the film Mithuru, along with Mariyam Azza, which was produced by her stepfather Ahmed Shiyam and co-starred with Rasheedha. Despite her recognition for on-screen appearances, Rishmy harbors a stronger interest in the behind-the-scenes aspects. Following her graduation from Centre for Higher Secondary Education, Rishmy made her official screen debut in Yaaraa Productions' debut album Yaaraa (2004), where she was featured in three songs; one of which she had penned the lyrics for. Apart from starring in their second production venture Yaaraa 2 (2005), Rishmy took on directing and editing responsibilities for most of the songs.

== Career ==
=== 2006–2013: Early work ===
Rishmy made her acting debut with Hukuru Vileyrey, which was based on a novel published by Ibrahim Waheed in Haveeru Daily three years prior. In addition to her on-screen role, Rishmy served as the co-director of the film, collaborating with her mother, Rasheedha. The film received both critical acclaim and commercial success. Rishmy's performance, in particular, garnered praise from critics, with many highlighting a scene where she tears up a raw fish and commending her for her daring portrayal. The film was recognized as "one of the few acceptable horror movies the Maldives film industry has ever produced". For her portrayal of the character, Rishmy earned a nomination for Best Actress at the 5th Gaumee Film Awards ceremony. The film was subsequently adapted into a 15-episode television series, featuring additional clips that were edited out during its theatrical release. Following this success, Rishmy collaborated on the series album Yaaraa 4 which was released in 2007.

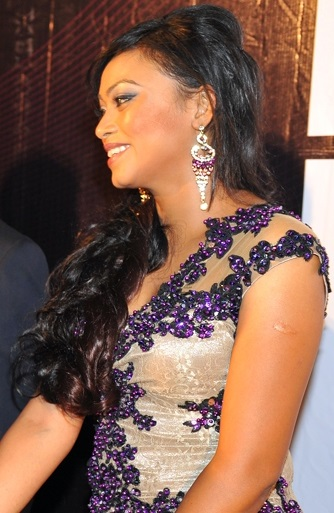
Rishmy at 2nd Maldives Film Awards ceremony, 2012

In 2010, Yaaraa Productions released their second film, Fanaa—also directed by her—where she portrayed the character Mamdhooha, heavily influenced by her mother to the extent that she aspires to break free from life's constraints. Based on a novel published by Waheed titled Balgish, the film garnered a mixed to negative response from critics. Ali Naafiz from Haveeru Daily classified the film as the "worst Maldivian film released so far" during the year. Rishmy's portrayal of her character faced criticism from Naafiz, who perceived her performance as "over-acting" and felt that she was "still immature for a role in a feature film". However, other critics applauded Rishmy's performance, considering it worthy of a "standing ovation," despite expressing displeasure with the film's length. At the 6th Gaumee Film Awards, she received the Best Supporting Actress award and the Best Costume Design award while also earning a nomination for Best Director.

The following year, Rishmy first appeared in Aishath Ali Manik's romantic horror film Kuhveriakee Kaakuhey? (2011) opposite Ahmed Azmeel. Inspired by the Bollywood horror romantic thriller Darling (2007), the film's pre-production began in 2007, and it was shot in Sri Lanka. The storyline revolves around a man who cheats on his wife with his secretary, leading to a haunting turn of events when he accidentally kills his mistress. The film and her performance as a spirit received negative reviews from critics with one stating, "Rishmy did an average job; not bad and good either. Perhaps the director was unable to extract the best of her talent since they failed to develop her character well. The film performed poorly at the box office and was declared a flop. This was followed by another romantic horror film, 14 Vileyrey, directed by Abdul Faththaah and starring Ali Seezan with Mariyam Nisha. The film, written by Ibrahim Waheed, faced controversy when the team of Kuhveriakee Kaakuhey? accused Faththaah of "purloining the plot" of the latter. Despite the controversy, 14 Vileyrey and Rishmy's performance received mixed to positive reviews from critics, with some stating, "Rishmy is the scene-stealer of the movie. This could be her breakthrough performance since she has the star power to shine in a cast of established actors". The film performed well at the box office and was declared a hit. At the 2nd Maldives Film Awards, she received a nomination for Best Supporting Actress for her role in 14 Vileyrey. She next appeared in a brief role as a news presenter in Ali Seezan's war action comedy film Wathan, which received negative response from critics.

Her next release was Ahmed Azmeel's directorial debut, Hiyy Yaara Dheefa (2011), in which she starred alongside Ali Seezan, Niuma Mohamed, Ahmed Azmeel and Aminath Rasheedha. The film garnered negative reviews from critics who noted similarities between the Bollywood comedy-drama Ishq (1997) and Kundan Shah's family drama Dil Hai Tumhaara (2002). The film revolves around four young people from different social classes who fall in love with partners disapproved by their parents. She played Nathasha, a rich girl who falls in love with a poor boy. While the film did not fare well financially, her performance received moderate acclaim from critics. At the 7th Gaumee Film Awards ceremony, she received a nomination for Best Supporting Actress. Rishmy's sole release in 2012 was Abdul Faththaah's romantic film Love Story (2012), alongside Ali Seezan and Amira Ismail. However, the film and her performance were met with a negative response from critics. Nadheem of Haveeru expressed dissatisfaction with the screenplay and actors' performances, stating, "None of the actors were given scope to build their characters, and none was able to justify their character. With excessive emotional scenes, actors were exposed to over-acting and nothing more. Despite the unfavorable reviews, Rishmy received her third Gaumee Film Award nomination for Best Supporting Actress and another Maldives Film Awards nomination for Best Supporting Actress.

=== 2014–present: Critical success and Vishka ===
In 2014, Rishmy starred opposite Ali Seezan in his directorial venture, the psychological thriller Insaana, where she portrayed the sharp-tongued wife who is tragically murdered by her husband. Additionally, she served as an assistant director for the film. The storyline revolves around a murderer attempting to evade guilt after the crime. Made on a budget of MVR220,000, the film drew inspiration from Ryan Connolly's short psychological horror film Tell (2012), loosely based on the Edgar Allan Poe's short story "The Tell-Tale Heart". Upon its release, the film received widespread critical acclaim. Hassan Naail from Vaguthu hailed it as "one of the best Maldivian releases to date" and praised Rishmy's dual role as assistant director and lead actress. Naail specifically commended her post-death scenes, stating, "Her acting—specifically after the death—the expression and the look were sheer brilliance, giving you goosebumps". At the 2015 South Asian Association for Regional Cooperation Film Festival, Insaana was honored with the bronze medal for Best Film, competing against seventeen regional films.

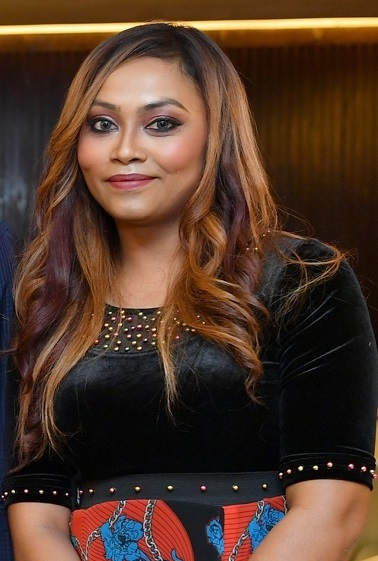
Rishmy at Niuma Mohamed's Silver Jubilee celebration event, 2019

The subsequent year featured Rishmy in the Ravee Farooq-directed film Mikoe Bappa Baey Baey (2015), where she starred opposite Mohamed Manik. In the film, she portrayed the character Aminath Shifa, a mother prepared to go to any lengths to shield her child from harm, particularly from a man suffering from post-traumatic amnesia. Both the film and Rishmy's character received critical acclaim, with Asiyath Mohamed Saeed specifically praising Rishmy's acting and how she delved into the depths of her character. Critics highlighted a scene in which Rishmy carries the "fainted" Manik over her shoulder, noting its significance in portraying women's empowerment in a manner unprecedented in Maldivian cinema. It was one of the three entries from Maldives to the SAARC Film Festival 2016. At the 8th Gaumee Film Awards, Rishmy secured her second Best Actress nomination for her role in the film. During the same year, she co-directed and starred in Fathimath Nahula's television drama series Vakivumuge Kurin (2015), playing the role of a devoted wife responsible for looking after her irresponsible sister.

In 2017, Rishmy took on the role of Vishka, a determined woman ensnared between an immoral individual and a corrupted politician, in Ravee Farooq's crime thriller Vishka. Prior to its release, the film encountered controversies when Hassan Haleel requested a deferment, claiming alleged ownership of the story and script. However, the film was ultimately cleared for exhibition through a court order that affirmed Rishmy's ownership of the script and story. Upon its release, the film received a positive response from critics. Mohamed Musthafa of Sun praised its "unexpected climax" and was "astounded" by Rishmy's role, noting, "Showcased as an independent and strong woman, Rishmy's portrayal of Vishka deserves full marks". The film was showcased at the SAARC Film Festival 2017 and went on to win the Best Actress award, marking Rishmy as the first Maldivian actress to receive an international award. The film bestowed her with a Gaumee Film Award for Best Actress. In 2019, the Government of Maldives acknowledged her exceptional achievements by honoring her with the National Award of Special Achievement, specifically recognizing her International Award for Best Actress.

In 2020, Rishmy collaborated with Ravee Farooq for his web series Ehenas, which revolves around a sexually and domestically abused young man and how he deals with the society. Although the series is based on Ahmed Iqbal's novel Ehenas Hama Loabiveyey, her character, Shaaira; the carefree wife of a long-term victim of domestic and sexual abuse, is a freshly developed character. The character is considered by the writer Iqbal as the most challenging character to develop. Ifraz Ali from Dho? reviewing the second season of the series noted her character to be "challenging" and "empowering". However, he pointed out that the repetition of her dialogues in the series contradicts the "power of her character". While most critics praised her "bold" performance in the series, it faced controversies due to the boldness and raw dialogues that were considered below the expected social standards.

During the subsequent year, Rishmy played the role of an elder sister who suffers from a sleeping disorder and seeks solace in ruqyah as a treatment, in Abdulla Muaz-directed segment from Raajje TV's anthology television series Hatharu Manzaru. The segment Ruqyah received positive reviews from critics who praised its "realistic" and "elaborative" presentation of the "recent fake ruqyah practice" performed by two locals. Following this, Rishmy took on the role of a mother of two and a victim of domestic abuse in the segment titled "Rahmedhu" from Ahmed Asim's crime suspense anthology web series Vihaali (2022). She then starred in Ilyas Waheed's horror thriller anthology web series Biruveri Vaahaka as a magician. Upon its release, the series garnered widespread critical acclaim across various aspects, including its writing, direction, performances, and visual design. Notably, it was praised for its "skillful incorporation of horror folklore into an engaging visual experience".

In 2023, Rishmy released her dream project, the romantic comedy web series Yaaraa, which explores the polar opposite lives of two sisters faced with the realities of relationships. In the series, she portrayed and ambitious and driven daughter who sees her life as a fairytale waiting to unfold.

== Personal life ==
In May 2007, Rishmy married her co-star Ahmed Azmeel, with whom she shared screen space in many of their production albums. On 3 December 2008, Rishmy gave birth to a son, Ismail Aziel Azumeel, while the couple divorced a few years later. She then started a relationship with Ravee Farooq. On 25 March 2019, Rishmy and Farooq got married without publicity. On 9 February 2022, Rishmy announced their divorce through her social media account.

== Media image ==
In 2011, Rishmy was voted in the top three as the "Most Entertaining Actress" in the SunFM Awards 2010, an award night ceremony initiated by Sun Media Group to honour the most recognized personalities in different fields, during the previous year. In 2012, she was ranked at the tenth position in the list of "Best Actresses in Maldives" compiled by Haveeru, where writer Ahmed Nadheem labelled her as the "Queen of video songs" who brought a revelation to the industry. In 2018, she was ranked in the fourth position from Dho?'s list of Top Ten Actresses of Maldives where writer Aishath Maaha opined that Rishmy is the "most promising actress from the current generation" and an optimistic director too.

== Filmography ==
=== Feature film ===
| Year | Title | Role | Notes | Ref(s) |
|---|---|---|---|---|
| 1993 | Mithuru | —N/a | Child actor | |
| 2006 | Hukuru Vileyrey | Nahidha | Also the director Nominated—Gaumee Film Award for Best Actress | |
| 2008 | Yoosuf | Herself | Special appearance in the song "Masthee Masthee" | |
| 2010 | Fanaa | Mamdhooha "Mandhi" | Also the director Gaumee Film Award for Best Supporting Actress; Nominated—Gaumee Film Award for Best Director | |
| 2011 | Kuhveriakee Kaakuhey? | Asha Ali | | |
| 2011 | 14 Vileyrey | Nazima | Nominated—Maldives Film Award for Best Supporting Actress | |
| 2011 | Wathan | News presenter | Special appearance | |
| 2011 | Hiyy Yaara Dheefa | Nathasha | Nominated—Gaumee Film Award for Best Supporting Actress | |
| 2012 | Love Story | Hana | Nominated—Gaumee Film Award for Best Supporting Actress; Nominated—Maldives Film Award for Best Supporting Actress | |
| 2014 | Insaana | Hana | | |
| 2015 | Mikoe Bappa Baey Baey | Aminath Shifa / Nisha | Nominated—Gaumee Film Award for Best Actress | |
| 2017 | Vishka | Vishka / Raisha Shareef | SAARC Film Festival 2017 Best Actress; Gaumee Film Award for Best Actress | |
| 2023 | Nina | Herself | Special appearance | |
| 2023 | Free Delivery | Herself | Special appearance in the song "U I Ah" | |
| 2023 | November | Herself | Special appearance | |
| 2026 | Paree – Chapter 1 | Raufa | | |
| 2026 | Paree – Chapter 2 | Raufa | | |
| 2026 | Magey Bituge Wedding | Herself | Special appearance in song "Kaiveni Medley" | |
| 2026 | Dhevi | Maleeha | Also the editor | |
| 2027 | WFT † | Imrah | | |

=== Television ===
| Year | Title | Role | Notes | Ref(s) |
|---|---|---|---|---|
| 2009 | Mihithah Loabi Dheyshey | Hudha | Also the director Main role; 15 episodes | |
| 2013 | Vaudhey Mee | Aishath Hana | Main role; 13 episodes | |
| 2015 | Vakivumuge Kurin | Reenee | Also co-director Main role; 8 episodes | |
| 2019–2020 | Ehenas | Shaira | Main role; 13 episodes | |
| 2021 | Hatharu Manzaru | Muna / Adhila | Voice-over in the segment "Hayaaiy"; Main role in the segment "Ruqyah" | |
| 2022 | Vihaali | Lai | Main role in the segment "Rahmedhu" | |
| 2022 | Biruveri Vaahaka | Leesh | Main role; 3 episodes | |
| 2023–2024 | Yaaraa | Raayaa | Also director, producer, editor Main role; 50 episodes | |
| 2025 | Chaalaakee | | | |

=== Short film ===
| Year | Title | Role | Notes | Ref(s) |
|---|---|---|---|---|
| 2006 | Kudafoolhuge Vasvaas | Herself | Special appearance | |
| 2007 | Umurahvess Inthizaaru Kuraanan | Reshma | Also the co-director and editor | |
| 2007 | Jinneenge Dharubaaru | Herself | Special appearance in the song "Hiyy Ufaavey Mireyge" | |
| 2011 | Farihibe 3 | Fadheeha | Nominated—Gaumee Film Award for Best Supporting Actress - Short Film | |
| 2011 | Bodu 13 Muassasaa | Mariyam | | |
| 2013 | Farihibe 4 | Suraiyya | Nominated—Gaumee Film Award for Best Supporting Actress - Short Film; Maldives Film Award for Best Supporting Actress - Short Film | |
| 2020 | KKB: Kuda Kuda Baaru | Zeena | | |
| 2020 | Thadhu | Aisha | | |
| 2021 | Gulhun | Haula | | |

=== Other work ===
| Year | Title | Director | Producer | Screenwriter | Editor | Notes | Ref(s) |
|---|---|---|---|---|---|---|---|
| 2006 | Hukuru Vileyrey | Yes | | Yes | Yes | Feature film | |
| 2007 | Umurahvess Inthizaaru Kuraanan | Yes | | | Yes | Short film | |
| 2010 | Fanaa | Yes | | Yes | Yes | Feature film | |
| 2009 | Mihithah Loabi Dheyshey | Yes | | | Yes | Television series; 15 episodes | |
| 2010 | Vishka | | Yes | | | Feature film | |
| 2015 | Vakivumuge Kurin | Yes | | | | Television series; 8 episodes | |
| 2017 | Bos | Yes | | | | Feature film | |
| 2023 | Yaaraa | Yes | Yes | | Yes | Web series; 50 episodes | |
| 2025 | Sorry | | | | Yes | Feature film | |
| 2025 | Huvaa (Season 3) | Yes | | | | Web series | |

== Discography ==
| Year | Album/Film | Track | Co-artist(s) |
|---|---|---|---|
| 2012 | Tharinge Rey 2012 | "Koathaa Fathugai" | Ahmed Yafiu |
| 2013 | Tharinge Rey 2013 | "Keevvehey Nivaa Vamun" | Ahmed Shabeen |
| 2014 | Tharinge Rey 2014 | "Vaathee Ma Kaireega" | Ahmed Ibrahim |

== Accolades ==
| Year | Award | Category | Nominated work | Result | Ref(s) |
|---|---|---|---|---|---|
| 2008 | 5th Gaumee Film Awards | Best Actress | Hukuru Vileyrey | Nominated | |
| 2011 | 2nd SunFM Awards | Most Entertaining Actress | | Nominated | |
| 2012 | 2nd Maldives Film Awards | Best Supporting Actress | 14 Vileyrey | Nominated | |
| 2014 | 3rd Maldives Film Awards | Best Supporting Actress - Short Film | Farihibe 4 | Won | |
| 2014 | 3rd Maldives Film Awards | Best Makeup Artist - Short Film | Farihibe 4 (Shared with Fathimath Azifa) | Won | |
| 2014 | 3rd Maldives Film Awards | Best Supporting Actress | Love Story | Nominated | |
| 2015 | 6th Gaumee Film Awards | Best Director | Fanaa | Nominated | |
| 2015 | 6th Gaumee Film Awards | Best Supporting Actress | Fanaa | Won | |
| 2015 | 6th Gaumee Film Awards | Best Costume Design | Fanaa (shared with Aminath Rasheedha, Ahmed Shiyam) | Won | |
| 2016 | 7th Gaumee Film Awards | Best Supporting Actress | Love Story | Nominated | |
| 2016 | 7th Gaumee Film Awards | Best Supporting Actress | Hiyy Yaara Dheefa | Nominated | |
| 2016 | 7th Gaumee Film Awards | Best Choreography | Love Story (shared with Abdul Faththaah) | Nominated | |
| 2017 | 8th Gaumee Film Awards | Best Actress | Mikoe Bappa Baey Baey | Nominated | |
| 2017 | 8th Gaumee Film Awards | Best Supporting Actress - Short film | Farihibe 3 | Nominated | |
| 2017 | 8th Gaumee Film Awards | Best Supporting Actress - Short film | Farihibe 4 | Nominated | |
| 2017 | 7th SAARC Film Festival | Best Actress | Vishka | Won | |
| 2019 | 9th Gaumee Film Awards | Best Actress | Vishka | Won | |
| 2019 | National Award for Special Achievement | Acknowledged the receipt of an International Award for Best Actress | | Won | |
| 2021 | 5th Dr. Sarojini Naidu | International Award for Working Women | | Won | |
