= Gaumee Film Awards =

Maldivian film industry awards

- Current: 9th Gaumee Film Awards
- Awarded for: Excellence in cinematic achievements
- Country: Maldives
- Presented by: National Centre for the Arts
- First award: 1994
- Website: nca.gov.mv

Television/radio coverage
- Network: Television Maldives

The Gaumee Film Awards aka Dhivehi Film Awards are presented by National Centre for the Arts to honour both artistic and technical excellence of professionals in the Maldivian film industry. The Gaumee Film Award ceremony is the oldest film events in Maldives.

The ceremony had been sponsored by various private organisations in the past as well as in present provisions. A live ceremony was broadcast to television audiences.

== History ==
A meeting was arranged at MCM on 30 October 1993, once the government decides to hold a Film Festival to honor the film industry. The awards were first introduced in 1994. Out of the twenty two people invited from the fraternity, only ten people showed up for the meeting. The preparations and award categories were discussed and decided in the meeting.

Ceremony	Awarded year	Awarded period	Ref(s)
1st Gaumee Film Awards	15 January 1995	Films released before 1995	
2nd Gaumee Film Awards	25 November 1997	1995 — 1996	
3rd Gaumee Film Awards	3 March 2007	1997 — 2002	
4th Gaumee Film Awards	29 December 2007	2003 — 2005	
5th Gaumee Film Awards	12 April 2008	2006 — 2007	
6th Gaumee Film Awards	22 October 2015	2008 — 2010	
7th Gaumee Film Awards	21 December 2016	2011 — 2013	
8th Gaumee Film Awards	20 December 2017	2014 — 2016	
9th Gaumee Film Awards	15 November 2019	2017 — 2018	

== Awards ==
Gaumee Film Awards are given in the following categories. Follow the links for lists of the award winners, year by year.

- Best Film
- Best Director
- Best Actor
- Best Actress
- Best Supporting Actor
- Best Supporting Actress
- Best Male Debut
- Best Female Debut
- Original Song
- Best Lyricist
- Best Playback Singer – Male
- Best Playback Singer – Female
- Best Editing
- Best Cinematography
- Best Screenplay
- Best Background Music
- Best Sound Editing
- Best Sound Mixing
- Best Art Direction
- Best Visual Effects
- Best Costume Design
- Best Makeup
- Best Choreography
