= Gaumee Film Award for Best Actor =

Gaumee Film Award

- Awarded for: Best Actor
- Country: Maldives
- Presented by: National Centre for the Arts

The Gaumee Film Award for Best Actor is given as part of the Gaumee Film Awards for Maldivian Films.

The award was first given in 1995. Here is a list of the award winners and the nominees of the respective award ceremonies.

== Superlatives ==
Superlative	Actor	Record
Actor with most awards	Yoosuf Shafeeu	4
Actor with most nominations	Yoosuf Shafeeu	10
Actor with most nominations in a single year	Yoosuf Shafeeu	3 (4th and 6th award)
Actor with most consecutive year nominations	Yoosuf Shafeeu	4 (4th–7th award)
Actor with most nominations without ever winning	Mohamed Manik; Ravee Farooq	2
Eldest winner	Yoosuf Shafeeu (Dhevansoora)	43
Eldest nominee	Roanu Hassan Manik (Hulhudhaan)	56
Youngest winner	Ali Seezan (Hiiy Edhenee)	24
Youngest nominee	Ravee Farooq (Hiyani)	24

== Winners and nominees ==
Year	Photos of winners	Actor	Film	Ref(s)
1st (1995)		Ismail Wajeeh	Ihsaas	
1st (1995)		Ali Khalid	Dheriyaa	
2nd (1997)		Reeko Moosa Manik	Haqqu	
2nd (1997)		No Other Nominee		
3rd (2007)		Ali Seezan	Hiiy Edhenee	
3rd (2007)		Ali Khalid	Amaanaaiy	
3rd (2007)		Reeko Moosa Manik	Fathis Handhuvaru	
4th (2007)		Yoosuf Shafeeu	Vehey Vaarey Therein	
4th (2007)		Yoosuf Shafeeu	Kalaayaanulaa	
4th (2007)		Yoosuf Shafeeu	Zuleykha	
4th (2007)		Ali Seezan	Dharinnahtakai	
4th (2007)		Mohamed Manik	Eynaa	
5th (2008)		Yoosuf Shafeeu	Vaaloabi Engeynama	
5th (2008)		Ravee Farooq	Hiyani	
5th (2008)		Yoosuf Shafeeu	Hukuru Vileyrey	
5th (2008)		Mohamed Manik	Hithuge Edhun	
6th (2015)		Yoosuf Shafeeu	Happy Birthday	
6th (2015)		Ahmed Nimal	Niuma	
6th (2015)		Yoosuf Shafeeu	Veeraana	
6th (2015)		Yoosuf Shafeeu	Yoosuf	
6th (2015)		Ahmed Azmeel	Fanaa	
7th (2016)		Ismail Rasheed	Loodhifa	
7th (2016)		Ismail Rasheed	Ingili	
7th (2016)		Ahmed Saeed	Insaaf	
7th (2016)		Lufshan Shakeeb	Sazaa	
7th (2016)		Yoosuf Shafeeu	Fathis Handhuvaruge Feshun 3D	
8th (2017)		Mohamed Jumayyil	Vaashey Mashaa Ekee	
8th (2017)		Roanu Hassan Manik	Hulhudhaan	
8th (2017)		Ali Seezan	Ahsham	
8th (2017)		Ibrahim Jihad	4426	
8th (2017)		Mohamed Jumayyil	Emme Fahu Vindha Jehendhen	
9th (2019)		Yoosuf Shafeeu	Dhevansoora	
9th (2019)		Mohamed Munthasir	Ill Noise	
9th (2019)		Ravee Farooq	Vishka	
9th (2019)		Mohamed Jumayyil	Vakin Loabin	
9th (2019)		Ismail Zahir	Malikaa	

== See also ==
- Gaumee Film Awards
