= 9th Gaumee Film Awards =

- Date: 15 November 2019

Highlights
- Best Film: Vishka
- Most awards: Vishka (7)
- Most nominations: Hahdhu (17)

9th Gaumee Film Awards ceremony, honored the best Maldivian films released in 2017 and 2018. The ceremony was held on 15 November 2019.

== Winners and nominees ==
=== Main awards ===
Nominees were announced on 8 November 2020.

Best Film	Best Director
Vishka; Ill Noise; Hahdhu; Dhevansoora; Vakin Loabin	Yoosuf Shafeeu – Dhevansoora; Ismail Nihad – Ill Noise; Abdul Faththaah – Hahdhu; Ravee Farooq – Vishka; Ali Shifau – Vakin Loabin
Best Actor	Best Actress
Yoosuf Shafeeu – Dhevansoora; Mohamed Munthasir – Ill Noise; Ravee Farooq – Vishka; Mohamed Jumayyil – Vakin Loabin; Ismail Zahir – Malikaa	Aishath Rishmy – Vishka; Mariyam Azza – Mee Loaybakee; Mariyam Azza – Hahdhu; Mariyam Majudha – Vakin Loabin; Nuzuhath Shuaib – Malikaa
Best Supporting Actor	Best Supporting Actress
Ali Azim – Hahdhu; Ibrahim Jihad – Bos; Ibrahim Jihad – Dhevansoora; Ali Azim – Dhevansoora; Ahmed Saeed – Vishka	Khadheeja Ibrahim Didi – Vakin Loabin; Fathimath Azifa – Bos; Fauziyya Hassan – Hahdhu; Fathimath Azifa – Dhevansoora; Nuzuhath Shuaib – Vakin Loabin
Original Song	Best Lyricist
Fathuhulla Abdul Fatthah - "Hiyy Avas Vaa Goiy" - Bos; Ibrahim Shiham - "Dhuaa" - Hahdhu; Fathuhulla Shakeel - "Dhin Ufaa" - Dhevansoora; Ismail Adheel, Mohamed Abdul Ghanee - "Vishka" - Vishka; Shammoon Mohamed - "Dhuniye Dhauruve" - Vakin Loabin	Mausoom Shakir - "Hiyy Avas Vaa Goiy" - Bos; Mohamed Abdul Ghanee - "Dhuaa" - Hahdhu; Zarana Zareer - "Dhin Ufaa" - Dhevansoora; Abdulla Jailam Wajeeh - "Vishka" - Vishka; Shammoon Mohamed - "Dhuniye Dhauruve" - Vakin Loabin
Best Playback Singer – Male	Best Playback Singer – Female
Ahmed Nabeel Mohamed - "Hiyy Avas Vaa Goiy" - Bos; Mohamed Abdul Ghanee - "Aharenge Hiyy Himeynvey" - Bos; Mohamed Aalam Latheef - "Loabivaa Ey" - Mee Loaybakee; Hussain Shifan - "Dhin Ufaa" - Dhevansoora; Shammoon Mohamed - "Dhuniye Dhauruve" - Vakin Loabin	Mariyam Rifqa Rasheed - "Vishka" - Vishka; Khadheeja Mohamed - "Maazee Aalaa Vumun" - Mee Loaybakee; Mariyam Ashfa - "Udhuhilamaa" - Hahdhu; Mariyam Ashfa - "Dhuaa" - Hahdhu; Mariyam Ashfa - "Beehilaashey" - Hahdhu

=== Technical awards ===
Best Editing	Best Cinematography
Yoosuf Shafeeu – Dhevansoora; Ahmed Sajid – Ill Noise; Ahmed Sajid – Hahdhu; Ravee Farooq – Vishka; Ahmed Asim – Malikaa	Ahmed Shamin Nizam – Vishka; Hussain Adnan, Mohamed Ishan – Bos; Vishal Amir Ahmed – Ill Noise; Ibrahim Wisan – Hahdhu; Ibrahim Moosa – Dhevansoora
Best Screenplay	Best Background Music
Yoosuf Shafeeu – Dhevansoora; Ahmed Mauroof Jameel – Ill Noise; Mahdi Ahmed – Hahdhu; Mahdi Ahmed – Vishka; Aishath Fuad Thaufeeq – Vakin Loabin	Ismail Adheel – Ill Noise; Ismail Adheel – Hahdhu; Fathuhulla Shakeel – Dhevansoora; Mohamed Ikram – Vishka; Mohamed Ikram – Vakin Loabin
Best Art Direction	Best Costume Design
Ahmed Mohamed Imad – Vishka; Adam Mufassir – Ill Noise; Abdul Faththaah – Hahdhu; Yoosuf Shafeeu – Dhevansoora; Ali Shifau, Mohamed Ali, Aishath Fuad Thaufeeq – Vakin Loabin	Abdulla Wisham, Aminath Noora, Mohamed Riffath – Vishka; Adam Munthasir – Ill Noise; Naziya Ismail – Hahdhu; Eupe Productions – Dhevansoora; Hussain Hazim – Vakin Loabin
Best Sound Design
Mohamed Ikram – Vishka; Ismail Adheel – Ill Noise; Ismail Adheel – Hahdhu; Fathuhulla Shakeel – Dhevansoora; Ali Shifau – Vakin Loabin

=== Special awards ===
Jury Special Prize – Young Talent	Jury Special Prize - Outstanding Round Performance
Mariyam Yala Shifau – Vakin Loabin	Ali Azim – Hahdhu, Dhevansoora, Malikaa, Bos
Lifetime Achievement Award
Mohamed Rasheed

== Most wins ==
- Vishka - 6
- Dhevansoora - 4

== See also ==
- Gaumee Film Awards
