= Cinema of Maldives =

- Main distributors: Dark Rain Entertainment; Farivaa Films; Crystal Entertainment

Produced feature films (2018)
- Total: 4

The Cinema of Maldives is the Maldivian language film industry based in Malé, Maldives. The dominant style of Maldivian cinema is melodramatic cinema, which developed since 1990s and characterizes most films to this day. Cinema was introduced in Maldives in 1979. Linguistically, Maldivian films tend to use Dhivehi language, intelligible to native speakers, while modern Maldivian films also increasingly incorporate English. During the 1990s, many Maldivian films were inspired by Bollywood, with some of the films being unofficial remakes of those films. The industry continued to grow, and some successful Maldivian films were produced.

== History ==
=== 1979–2009: Early releases ===
In the late 1979, a trend of screening Hindi films at the limited cinemas arises. A group of Maldivians came up with the idea of making a regional film for the Maldivian audience though several obstacles emerged including incapability to secure finance and equipment. However, they were successful to acquire a small camera which resulted in the first Maldivian song "Noorey Vidhee Moonun Roashan Ujaala" featuring Hassan Afeef and Rahma. Shot at Sultan Park, the song gets leaked prior its official release hence the project of making a film was dismissed. During the time, an independent organization called Bronze Movie Society was introduced to encourage film making.

After three years, the first Maldivian film was release under the helm of then Minister of Health, Musthafa Hussain. Titled Thin Fiyavalhu (1982), the film stars Hassan Afeef in lead role and tells a story of a romantic relationship between a girl who comes to Male' from an island and a boy who lives in the house she resides in Male'. The film was accepted and appreciated by the audience resulting in the second release Copy. During the time, Television Maldives was working on another film titled Orchid: Eynage Maa, giving "the required push" for those interested in film-making.

In the 1980s and 1990s most of the Maldivian feature films were influenced in film-making, style and presentation by Bollywood movies. Though few off-track movies of different genres were made, majority of them are strictly influenced by Bollywood, awakening a necessity of a realism and naturalism cinema movement. In 1994, Mohamed Niyaz released his only directed feature film Dheriyaa which requisites the style of film-making the industry follows. The same year, Gaumee Film Awards was inaugurated to honour both artistic and technical excellence of professionals in the Maldivian film industry. Dheriyaa was bestowed with 8 Gaumee Film Awards. 1996 witnessed the release of the most successful Maldivian film, Easa Shareef's horror film Fathis Handhuvaru. Successful actors at the time included Reeko Moosa Manik, Ali Shameel, Hassan Afeef, Moosa Zakariyya, Hussain Sobah while successful actresses included Aishath Shiranee, Mariyam Nisha, Jamsheedha Ahmed and Waleedha Waleedh.

During the 2000s, a trend of remaking Bollywood films was followed. Hussain Adil's Hiyy Halaaku (1999) was an unofficial remake of Karan Johar's romantic drama film Kuch Kuch Hota Hai (1998) starring Shah Rukh Khan, Kajol and Rani Mukerji in the lead role while Aishath Ali Manik followed the same trend while making Asad Shareef, Sheela Najeeb, Ali Seezan and Niuma Mohamed starrer Hiiy Edhenee (2001) was copied from Dharmesh Darshan's romantic film Dhadkan (2000) starring Akshay Kumar, Suniel Shetty and Shilpa Shetty. Similarly, Aslam Rasheed's romantic thriller Dheevaanaa (2001) was an unofficial remake of Ram Gopal Varma's romantic thriller Pyaar Tune Kya Kiya released in the same year, while Easa Shareef's horror film Ginihila (2003) is drawn from Vikram Bhatt's Raaz (2002). The decade also saw the trend of established directors like Fathimath Nahula and Abdul Faththaah making melodrama entertainers like Naaummeedhu (2001), Loabi Nuvevununama (2002), Aan... Aharenves Loabivin (2003), Kalaayaanulaa (2003), Zuleykha (2005), Vehey Vaarey Therein (2005) and Yoosuf (2008). In 2005, the first Maldivian romantic disaster film was released, Abdul Faththaah's Hureemey Inthizaarugaa which was heavily relied on the effect of the 2004 Indian Ocean earthquake on the Maldives. Majority of the films released during the decade was directed by Amjad Ibrahim. These films were often not the subject of critical acclaim. On the other hand, Moomin Fuad and Ali Shifau have been credited for redefining the Maldivian cinema with their own distinct brand of socially conscious cinema with art film like Heylaa (2006) and Happy Birthday (2009). These films focused on realistic parallel cinema and include believable narratives and strong messages, earning critical acclaim though they were commercial failures. Successful actors at the time included Yoosuf Shafeeu, Ali Seezan, and Mohamed Manik while successful actresses included Niuma Mohamed, and Sheela Najeeb.

=== 2010–present: International recognition ===
Majority of the films released in 2010s were based on themes; romance, drama and horror. In 2010, some family drama films dealt with social issues; Yoosuf Shafeeu’s Veeraana revolves around a child being sexually abused by a pedophilia while Niuma Mohamed’s debut direction, Niuma showed the titular character being sexually assaulted by her father and brother. Also, Shafeeu-directed Heyonuvaane revolves around a male who is victimised of domestic abuse. It also marks the first film released in theaters along with English subtitles. The following year, Moomin Fuad's crime tragedy drama film Loodhifa was released attracting widespread critical acclaim though it fails to leave much impact financially. Prior to release, the film is marketed to be one of the most bold and risky movies released in the industry. The year introduced a war drama film, Ali Seezan's Wathan, where the genre was later experimented in 2016 by Ash'har Waheed in Haadharu. In 2010, ten Maldivian feature films were released while in 2011 the number was increased to thirteen. 2012, witnessed a big drop in film releases, due to the only theatre, Olympus Cinema, being closed for upgrading.

The following year, Ali Shifau-directed horror film Fathis Handhuvaruge Feshun 3D (2013) was released which marks the first 3D release for a Maldivian film and the first prequel made in the industry. It was followed by Ravee Farooq's experimental suspense thriller Ingili (2013) which initiated the recognition of Maldivian cinema in international platforms. The regional success was recommenced with Ali Seezan's psychological thriller Insaana (2014) and Farooq's Vishka (2017). The decade also saw the rise of a new generation of popular actors like Mohamed Jumayyil, Vicente Baraquel, Ravee Farooq and Ahmed Azmeel while popular actresses include Aishath Rishmy, Mariyam Majudha, Fathimath Fareela and Maleeha Waheed.

== Challenges for Maldivian Cinema ==
Raajje.mv identifies six major challenges that have influenced the progress of Maldivian popular cinema:

- There are only a small amount of actors and actresses, which could be a factor that the industry is unable to successfully gain much improvement over the recent years even with much hard work and dedication.
- Most of the Maldivian films are set in one location due to failure to attain what they seek.
- Filmmakers are not provided with opportunities to submit their productions to other international festivals.
- Lack of budget and resources to finance the films.
- Lack of government support.

== Genre conventions ==
Maldivian films are mostly melodramatic and horror films. They frequently employ formulaic ingredients such as star-crossed lovers, enraged parents, love triangles, cunning in-laws, sacrifice, dramatic reversals of fortune, and convenient coincidences. Some films include elements of musicals and are expected to contain catchy music in the form of song-and-dance numbers woven into the script. A film's success often depends on the quality of such musical numbers. A film's music is often released before the movie to attract the audience. However, there are few Maldivian films with more artistic aims and more sophisticated stories. They often lost out at the box office to movies with more mass appeal.

== Awards ==
The Gaumee Film Awards ceremony is one of the most prominent film events given for Maldivian films. Presented by National Centre for the Arts to honour both artistic and technical excellence of professionals in the Maldivian film industry, it is the oldest film events in Maldives. The 1st Gaumee Film Awards ceremony was held in 1994 and films released prior to this year was judged. Till the 8th Gaumee Film Awards ceremony, films released on a span of two or more years were judged for each ceremony.

Notable awards ceremonies for Maldivian films, held within Maldives are:

- Gaumee Film Awards – since 1994
- Maldives Film Awards – 2011-2013

Most of these award ceremonies are lavishly staged spectacles, featuring singing, dancing, and numerous celebrities.

== See also ==
- List of cinema industries by location
