= Sorry (2025 film) =

2025 Maldivian film

- Official film poster
- Directed by: Fathimath Nahula
- Written by: Fathimath Nahula
- Screenplay by: Fathimath Nahula
- Produced by: Hassan Sinan
- Starring: Yoosuf Shafeeu; Mariyam Azza; Ahmed Easa; Ali Shameel; Sheela Najeeb; Washiya Mohamed; Aisha Ali; Moosa Aleef
- Cinematography: Aiman; Ibahim Moosa
- Edited by: Aishath Rishmy
- Music by: Fathulla Shakeel Hussain
- Production company: Crystal Entertainment
- Release date: 17 June 2025
- Country: Maldives
- Language: Dhivehi

Sorry is a 2025 Maldivian romantic drama film directed by Fathimath Nahula. Produced by Hassan Sinan under Crystal Entertainment, the film stars Yoosuf Shafeeu, Mariyam Azza, Ahmed Easa, Ali Shameel, Sheela Najeeb, Washiya Mohamed, Aisha Ali and Moosa Aleef in pivotal roles. The film was released on 17 June 2025.

== Cast ==
- Yoosuf Shafeeu as Maiz Mohamed
- Mariyam Azza as Zaara; Maiz's wife
- Ahmed Easa as Ziyad; Zaara's ex husband
- Ali Shameel as Jabir; Zaara's father
- Sheela Najeeb as Sama; Hana's mother
- Washiya Mohamed as Hana; Ziyad's ex wife
- Aisha Ali as Neera; Hana's sister
- Hussain Sobah as Fiyaz; Sama's husband
- Mohamed Rifshan as Hashim; Hana's brother
- Hamdhoon Farooq as Albo
- Ayesha Layaali Sinan as Zuleykha Layaali Maiz
- Evelin Livy Firaash as Fathmath Evely Ziyaad
- Ali Nadheeh as gangster
- Musthafa Hakeem
- Aminath Rasheedha as Ainthu; Maiz's mother (Special appearance)
- Moosa Aleef as Ahfal (Special appearance)
- Amira Ismail as Zoona; Zaara's sister (Special appearance)
- Mariyam Enash Sinan (Special Appearance)
- Ahmed Sharif (Maldivian actor) (Special Appearance)

Special appearances during the song "Salhiey" (in order of appearance)

- Aminath Inna
- Mariyam Shifa
- Aminath Aseela
- Nuzuhath Shuaib
- Mariyam Nisha
- Ansham Mohamed
- Mariyam Shakeela (actress)
- Aishath Shiranee
- Fathimath Raaya
- Aminath Noora
- Mariyam Majudha
- Nashidha Mohamed
- Mohamed Manik
- Saamee Hussain Didi
- Aishath Raaisha
- Aishath Rishmy
- Aishath Laisha Latheef
- Shaheedha Ahmed
- Gulisthan Mohamed
- Aminath Rishfa
- Nathasha Jaleel
- Aminath Rashfa
- Aishath Gulfa
- Mariyam Haleem

== Production ==
=== Development ===
The project was announced on 22 June 2019 as Fathimath Nahula's upcoming project, initially scheduled for release within the same year. By June 2019, the script was completed, and filming was set to begin in July 2019. However, due to the unavailability of the cast and crew, the project was postponed, with a tentative filming schedule set for 10 December 2019, aiming for completion within two months. Later that year, it was reported that Nahula offered Yoosuf Shafeeu the opportunity to direct the film. He had previously directed projects written and produced by Fathimath Nahula including, Veeraana (2010), Heyonuvaane (2010) and the web series Huvaa (2018–2020).

With the onset of the COVID-19 pandemic, the project was delayed indefinitely. On 18 April 2024, Nahula relaunched the project with plans for a 2025 release. n December 2024, it was confirmed that Nahula, along with Ravee Farooq, would direct the film. Post-production was initiated simultaneously, with 90% completed by February 2025.

=== Filming ===
Filming commenced on 17 December 2024, with the first schedule taking place in Male'. In late January 2025, the crew traveled to B. Kudarikilu for the second schedule, which was completed on 7 February 2025. By February 2025, 95% of the filming was completed, with only the climax remaining. The entire filming process was completed in 45 days.

=== Casting ===
The lead cast was announced in September 2019, featuring Yoosuf Shafeeu, Mariyam Azza, and a debutant. The film also includes Fathimath Nahula's youngest daughter, Layaali, and her granddaughter, Evely. Additional cast members reportedly include Sheela Najeeb and Hussain Sobah, marking their first on-screen appearances. During the filming schedule in B. Kudarikilu, the team revealed the participation of actors Aminath Rasheedha, Ali Shameel and Mohamed Rifshan. With the release of a promotional song, additional cast members were announced, including Washiya Mohamed, Ahmed Easa, Mohamed Manik, Amira Ismail, Moosa Aleef and Mariyam Nisha.

== Soundtrack ==
The music is composed by Ibrahim Zaid Ali and Barchie. The lyrics are written by Mausoom Shakir, Mohamed Abdul Ghanee, Adam Haleem Adnan and Kaneeru Abdul Raheem. In January 2020, it was announced that all seven planned songs for the movie had been composed and completed.

Track listing
| No. | Title | Lyrics | Music | Singer(s) | Length |
|---|---|---|---|---|---|
| 1. | "Mamma" | Mausoom Shakir | Ibrahim Zaid Ali | Mohamed Abdul Ghanee | 2:56 |
| 2. | "Hithuga Thi Soora" | Adam Haleem Adnan | Abdul Basith (Barchie) | Shalabee Ibrahim, Mariyam Ashfa | 4:05 |
| 3. | "Dhen Sorry" | Kaneeru Abdul Raheem | Ibrahim Zaid Ali | Ibrahim Zaid Ali, Nasma Abdul Muhsin | 4:06 |
| 4. | "Rovvaifi" | Mohamed Abdul Ghanee | Hussain Thaufeeq | Mohamed Abdul Ghanee | 4:02 |
| 5. | "Salhiey" | Mausoom Shakir | Ibrahim Zaid Ali | Ahmed Nabeel Mohamed, Aminath Raya Ashraf | 4:34 |
| 6. | "Fundu Fundu Veema" | Kaneeru Abdul Raheem | Ibrahim Zaid Ali | Mohamed Abdul Ghanee, Mariyam Ashfa | 5:17 |
| 7. | "Veynee Karunain Loa Foavey" (Theme song) | Adam Haleem Adnan | Ibrahim Zaid Ali | Ahmed Nabeel Mohamed, Mariyam Enash Sinan | 5:22 |
| 8. | "Hithuga Thi Soora" (Promotional song) | Adam Haleem Adnan | Abdul Basith (Barchie) | Shalabee Ibrahim, Mariyam Ashfa, Zahil Ibrahim Rameez |

== Release and reception ==
The film was theatrically released on 17 June 2025. Upon release, it received mainly positive reviews from critics. Praising the performances of the actors, Mariyam Waheedha from Sauvees highlighted that the child actors, Layaali and Evelin, "poured their hearts into their roles and moved the audience with their emotions and talent".
