= Fathimath Zoona =

Maldivian female singer

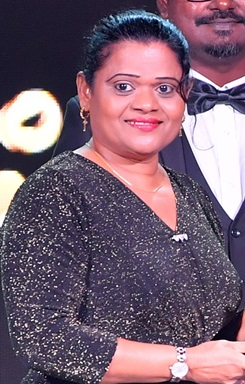
- Zoona at 9th Gaumee Film Awards ceremony, 2019
- Born: 20 October 1965 (age 60); Male', Maldives
- Occupation: Playback singer
- Years active: 1994–present
- Spouse: Mohamed Anas Tissera
- Children: Aishath Nishaya Mohamed Ahmed Nabeel Mohamed
- Musical career
- Genres: Pop; filmi; electronic
- Instrument: Vocals

Fathimath Zoona (20 October 1965) is a Maldivian singer and a recipient of several awards including one Gaumee Film Award and one Aafathis Award.

== Early life and career ==
Fathimath Zoona was born on 20 October 1965 in Male'. During her childhood days, she frequently listened to old Bollywood songs and decided to pursue a career in music industry. In 1994, she participated in the "Basic Voice Training Course" which resulted in her receiving several offers from music directors and producers to sing for their films, albums, advertisements and national events. In 1998, her seductive rendition of the song "Uff Heevanee" in the horror classic Fathis Handhuvaru fetched her first Aafathis Award for Best Female Playback Singer. The following year, she released her debut studio album, Kastholhu, her second album Ihusaas in 2004 and third album Loabivumakee in 2012.

In 2001, the Government of Maldives honoured her with the National Award of Recognition. Zoona received her first Gaumee Film Award for Best Female Playback Singer with her emotional rendition in the song "Magey Loabivaa Ey" from the film Hithuge Edhun (2006). Ahmed Adhushan from Mihaaru placed her in the top five female vocalists of Maldives and noted that she is "one of the most versatile singers we have in the industry who can belt slow to fast paced songs with much ease".

== Discography ==
=== Feature film ===
Year	Film	Song	Lyricist(s)	Co-artist(s)	Notes
1995	Dhushman	"Aavaa Udhaahey"	Ahmed Sharumeel	Abdul Hannan Moosa Didi	
1995	Dhushman	"Belumaa Kuree Havaaley"		Solo	Appears in Soundtrack album
1996	Hagu An'bi	"Dhen Roifa Dhefaigaa Hifee"	Ahmed Sharumeel	Solo	
1996	Hagu An'bi	"Ey Dhen Beywafaavee"	Ahmed Sharumeel	Solo	
1996	Haqqu	"Annakan Ingey"	Easa Shareef	Solo	
1996	Haqqu	"Dhannamutho Ey Loabeega"		Umar Zahir	
1996	Fun Asaru	"Loabi Mummy Bunan"	Fathimath Nahula	Fathimath Iraadhaa	
1996	Badhal	"Hairaanvaane Din Din Din"	Ahmed Sharumeel	Solo	
1996	Badhal	"Thaazaa Ufaa Veeyey"	Tharazboozu Ahmed Riza	Abdul Hannan Moosa Didi	
1996	Huras	"Reygaa Khiyaal Kureemey"	Jaufar Abdul Rahuman	Abdul Hannan Moosa Didi	
1996	Huras	"Dheyshey Vaanee Hoadhan Dhaanee"	Jaufar Abdul Rahuman	Solo	
1997	Diary	"Hiyy Mi Milkey"	Ahmed Sharumeel	Abdul Hannan Moosa Didi	
1997	Laila	"Karunun Loaves Fureyney"	Fathimath Nahula	Solo	
1997	Laila	"Dhaashey Kalaa"	Fathimath Nahula	Ismail Shiyaz	
1997	Fathis Handhuvaru	"Dhekey Hithun Dhen Kalaa"	Easa Shareef	Saahir	
1997	Fathis Handhuvaru	"Uff Heevanee"	Easa Shareef	Abdul Hannan Moosa Didi	
1997	Fathis Handhuvaru	"Mi Araa Iraku Han'dhaku"	Easa Shareef	Solo	Appears in Soundtrack album
1997	Dhefirin	"Dhulakee Fisaari Thoonu"		Mohamed Rashad	
1997	Dhefirin	"Fazaaga Vey Zuvaan Dhuvas"		Solo	
1997	Dhefirin	"Hiyy Mi Karunaigaa"		Solo	
1998	Fahuneyvaa	"Bunedheyn Dhathi Sirreh"		Ali Rameez	
1998	Fahuneyvaa	"Dhekefeemey Beevi Manzar"	Boi Ahmed Khaleel	Ali Rameez	
1998	Fahuneyvaa	"Magey Fahuneyvayaa Hamayah"	Mausoom Shakir	Abdul Sameeu	
1998	Olhunuvi Hiyy	"Emme Hiyy Edhey"	Tharaboozu Ahmed Riza	Solo	
1998	Olhunuvi Hiyy	"Reyrey Nidhin"		Solo	
1998	Mila Handhuvaru	"Fari Mooney Thee Hoadhaalaa"	Ahmed Sharumeel	Mohamed Shahuban	
1999	Viraashaa	"Vanee Haas Neyvaa"	Easa Shareef	Abdul Hannan Moosa Didi	
1999	Umurah	"Hiyy Edhey Araamuvee"	Adam Naseer Ibrahim	Ali Rameez	
1999	Umurah	"Ei Reethivi Iru Handhuthaa Ey"	Boi Ahmed Khaleel	Abdul Baaree	
1999	Qurbaani	"Hureemey Feneythoa"	Boi Ahmed Khaleel	Imaadh Ismail	
2000	Emme Fahu Dhuvas	"Loabeege Aalam Dhekeyshey"	Easa Shareef	Saahir	
2000	Emme Fahu Dhuvas	"Neyvaa Olhey"	Easa Shareef	Abdul Hannan Moosa Didi	
2000	Emme Fahu Dhuvas	"Neyngeyhen Heelaafaa"	Easa Shareef	Abdul Hannan Moosa Didi	
2000	2000 Vana Ufan Dhuvas	"Dhekilaa Hithey Vanee"	Easa Shareef	Ali Rameez	
2000	Ainbehge Loabi Firiehge Vaajib	"Hoadhaadheyshey Yaaraa"	Tharaboozu Ahmed Riza	Solo	
2001	Hiiy Edhenee	"Hiyy Edhenee" (Duet Version)	Easa Shareef	Abdul Hannan Moosa Didi	
2001	Hiiy Edhenee	"Hiyy Ves Dhen Fisaari Moyaey" (Version 1)	Easa Shareef	Abdul Baaree, Abdul Hannan Moosa Didi	
2001	Hiiy Edhenee	"Hiyy Ves Dhen Fisaari Moyaey" (Version 2)	Easa Shareef	Abdul Baaree	
2001	Hiiy Edhenee	"Hoa Hoa Govamun"	Easa Shareef	Ali Rameez	
2001	Hiiy Edhenee	"Furusathu Libi Dhuniyeyga"	Easa Shareef	Solo	
2001	Hiiy Edhenee	"Nan Ahaalan Haadha Beynumey"	Easa Shareef	Solo	Appears in Soundtrack album
2001	Naaummeedhu	"Kalaa Ah Mihiyy"	Mausoom Shakir	Ali Rameez	
2001	Naaummeedhu	"Kuri Shakku Hithun Filuvaifeemey"		Shameem	Appears in Soundtrack album
2002	Kahvalhah Dhaandhen	"Mihithun Loabi Dhevidhaaney"	Adam Naseer Ibrahim	Abdul Baaree	
2002	Loabi Nuvevununama	"Thiya Hiy Adhu Naseebuga"	Boi Ahmed Khaleel	Umar Zahir	
2003	Kalaayaanulaa	"Mivaagotheh Neyngeyey"	Mausoom Shakir	Hassan Ilham	
2003	Kalaayaanulaa	"Hee Samaasaa Rattehinnaa"	Mausoom Shakir	Mariyam Enash Sinan, Ahmed Nabeel Mohamed	
2003	Kalaayaanulaa	"Kalaayaanulaa"	Mausoom Shakir	Solo	
2003	Kalaayaanulaa	"Hithaamain Ohey"	Mausoom Shakir	Solo	
2003	Ginihila	"Dhiriulhumakee Miee Nunimey"	Easa Shareef	Abdul Baaree	
2003	Dhonkamana	"Annanee Fenvaruvan"	Easa Shareef	Abdul Baaree	
2003	Dhonkamana	"Naazukee Balaalun"	Easa Shareef	Abdul Hannan Moosa Didi	
2004	Hama Himeyn	"Hithah Feney"	Coco Hassan Haleem	Mohamed Fazeel	
2005	Zuleykha	"Qiyaamath Qiyaamath"	Mausoom Shakir	Mohamed Zaidh	
2005	Zuleykha	"Loabivaayanulaa" (Duet version)	Mausoom Shakir	Mumthaz Moosa	
2005	Zuleykha	"Loabivaayanulaa" (Female version)	Mausoom Shakir	Solo	Appears in Soundtrack album
2006	Hithuge Edhun	"Magey Loabivaa Ey"	Adam Haleem Adhnan	Solo	
2009	Udhabaani	"Kalhu Foige Reythah Gunan" (Duet Version)		Abdul Baaree	
2009	Udhabaani	"Handhuvaruge Alikan Libey"		Abdul Baaree	
2009	Udhabaani	"Kalhu Foige Reythah Gunan" (Female Version)		Solo	Appears in Soundtrack album
2009	Baaraige Fas	"Hiyy Edhey Moonakee"	Ahmed Nashidh (Dharavandhoo)	Mumthaz Moosa	
2010	Mi Hiyy Keekkuraanee?	"Yaaraa Dhekey Hiyy Veyey"		Mumthaz Moosa	
2010	Veeraana	"Veeraana" (Promotional song)	Adam Haleem Adhnan	Various artists	
2010	Heyonuvaane	"Dhekefeemey Beevi Manzaru"	Boi Ahmed Khaleel	Hassan Ilham	
2011	Laelaa	"Alhe Gaigaa Dhen Beehilaashey"	Ahmed Nashid	Mumthaz Moosa	Appears in Soundtrack album
2018	Reyvumun	"Himafodhu Vaarey"		Hussain Sobah	
2018	Reyvumun	"Reyvumun"		Solo	
2024	Udhabaani 2	"Alhe Gaigaa Dhen Beehilaashey"	Ahmed Nashid	Mumthaz Moosa	

=== Short film ===
Year	Title	Song	Lyricist(s)	Co-artist(s)
2001	Paree Dhahtha	"Ey Aishaa"	Hussain Sobah	Solo
2004	Dheke Dhekeves 1	"Hussaribai Vee Thedhey"		Solo
2005	Loabee Aishaa	"Vaathee Edhey Mibinmathee"		Solo
2006	Salhibe	"Raaguthakun Foni Roohee"	Adam Haleem Adhnan	Abdul Baaree
2006	Dheke Dhekeves 3	"Beehumun Ufaaveyhey"	Ahmed Nashidh (Dharavandhoo)	Solo
2006	Dheke Dhekeves 4	"Bigaraa Ey"	Adam Naseer Ibrahim	Hussain Ali
2007	Salhibe 2	"Hiyy Edhey Varun"		Imaadh Ismail
2007	Magey Dharifulhu	"Hithuga Magey"	Ahmed Haleem	Hassan Ilham

=== Television and Web Series ===
Year	Title	Song	Lyricist(s)	Co-artist(s)
1995	Hithi Thajuribaa	"Vaa Hithugaa Thi Baaru"	Fathimath Nahula	Mohamed Shahuban
1997	Kahthiri	"Birun Hureemaa, Ladhun Hureemaa"		Solo
2003	Edhuvas En'buri Annaanenama	"Hiyy Magey Kiyaadhemey"	Adam Haleem Adhnan	Hussain Sobah
2003	Edhuvas En'buri Annaanenama	"Mihiree Rakivefa"		Ahmed Amir
2008	Manzilakee Thee Ey Magey	"Haadha Loaiybey Heeleemaa"	Mausoom Shakir	Solo

=== Non-film songs ===
Year	Album/single	Song	Lyricist(s)	Co-artist(s)
N/A	N/A	"Hus Athaa Loabeege Magugaa"	Boi Ahmed Khaleel	Solo
N/A	N/A	"Neyngi Maadhurun Thoathaa Aadhey"	Boi Ahmed Khaleel	Abdul Baaree
N/A	N/A	"Maivantha Loabi"		Solo
1995	Aniyaa	"Ey Nuvee Ujaalaahey"	Tharaboozu Ahmed Riza	Solo
1995	Aniyaa	"Ley Dhauruve Uthurey Naaru"	Easa Shareef	Solo
1995	Aniyaa	"Bunamey Roifaa Dheynuhey"	Easa Shareef	Solo
1995	Dhassoora	"Nudheybalaa Alhaanulaa"	Fathimath Nahula	Abdul Hannan Moosa Didi
1995	Dhassoora	"Keehvehey Nivaavamun"	Fathimath Nahula	Abdul Hannan Moosa Didi
1995	Falivalhu	"Beynumey Dheynamey"	Fathimath Nahula	Abdul Hannan Moosa Didi
1995	Falivalhu	"Fidhaave Dhaanan"	Fathimath Nahula	Mohamed Shahuban
1995	Falivalhu	"Vaa Hithugaa Thi Baaru"	Fathimath Nahula	Mohamed Shahuban
1996	Fiyavalhu	"Dheewaanaa Kuraa Baarun"	Easa Shareef	Abdul Hannan Moosa Didi
1996	Fiyavalhu	"Vaavaru Miee"	Fathimath Nahula	Abdul Hannan Moosa Didi
1996	Fiyavalhu	"Loabi Mummy Bunan"	Fathimath Nahula	Fathimath Iraadha
1996	Maayoos	"Dhen Dhen Hithaa Loaiybah"	Ahmed Shakeeb	Abdul Hannan Moosa Didi
1996	Misraab	"Dheyshey Hithuge Maqaam"	Easa Shareef	Abdul Hannan Moosa Didi
1996	Misraab	"Gelluvaaleeye Thi An'dhireege Himeynkan"	Easa Shareef	Abdul Hannan Moosa Didi
1996	Udhares	"Hiyy Oyaalaathoa Kalaa"	Easa Shareef	Abdul Hannan Moosa Didi
1996	Udhares	"Ey Nuforuvaa Khazaanaa"	Easa Shareef	Abdul Hannan Moosa Didi
1996	Udhares	"Kollee Nagaafaa Samaasaa"	Easa Shareef	Abdul Hannan Moosa Didi
1997	Alivilun	"Hithugaa Haadha Riheyey"	Easa Shareef	Solo
1997	Alivilun	"Inkaaru Kuran Seedhaa"	Easa Shareef	Abdul Hannan Moosa Didi
1997	Beyqaraar	"Mihiyy Edhenee Kiyaadheefaa"	Ahmed Sharumeel	Mohamed Shahuban
1997	Eheege Adu	"In'geythee Faadu Faadu Vahbahun"	Easa Shareef	Hussain Sobah
1997	Furusathu	"Ithubaaru Kurey Mithuraa"		Aasim Thaufeeq
1997	Huvan'dhu	"Dhookurey Keekey"	Easa Shareef	Abdul Hannan Moosa Didi
1997	Kurunees	"Vaathee Edhey Mibinmathee"		Solo
1997	Raalhu	"Meygaavee Mi Hoadhaa Loabi"	Tharaboozu Ahmed Riza	Solo
1997	Raalhu	"Yaarunney Kiyaadhenee Ey"	Tharaboozu Ahmed Riza	Abdul Hannan Moosa Didi
1997	Thasveeru	"Dhanvaraku Vehunu Vaareygaa"		Abdul Hannan Moosa Didi
1997	Single	"Neyngumahvure Vakin Dhera Kameh"	Abdulla Sodhiq	Abdul Hannan Moosa Didi, Fazeela Amir, Ali Rameez, Umar Zahir, Mohamed Huzam
1998	Foni Zaharu	"Naazukee Balaalun"	Easa Shareef	Abdul Hannan Moosa Didi
1998	Husreethi	"Loabin Buney Aisbalaashey"		Mukhthar Adam
1998	Meeraa	"Misraabugaa Dhekkee Thuraa"	Kopee Mohamed Rasheedh	Massoodh Moosa Didi
1998	Randhoadhi	"Moosum Bahaarey Ai Miyey Dhoa"		Ali Rameez
1998	Randhoadhi	"Mi Hadhiyaa Dhineemaa"		Solo
1998	Randhoadhi	"Saafu Roohee Nazarakun"	Tharaboozu Ahmed Riza	Abdul Hannan Moosa Didi
1998	Redhan	"Ey Kalaa Hifaanuhey"	Kopee Mohamed Rasheedh	Abdul Hannan Moosa Didi
1998	Thaureef	"Hureemey Feneythoa"	Boi Ahmed Khaleel	Imaadh Ismail
1999	Dhirun	"Ninjaa Araamey"	Adam Haleem Adnan	Solo
1999	Dhirun	"Haadha Loabi Ma Vaathee"	Easa Shareef	Ali Rasheed (Stepin)
1999	Dhirun	"Farudhaavee Rihumeh Vey"		Solo
1999	Farumaan	"Thivaru Alhe Vanyaa"		Solo
1999	Ishq	"Heylaa Dhanvarugaa Noolheyshey"	Adam Haleem Adhnan	Mukhthar Adam
1999	Ishq	"Rey Hedhi Jaadhoo"	Adam Naseer Ibrahim	Solo
1999	Ishq	"Hoadhaasheyshey Yaaraa"	Tharaboozu Ahmed Riza	Solo
1999	Kastholhu	"Hureemey Fenigen Shoakh Vefaa"		Solo
1999	Kastholhu	"Ekanivaakan Engeemaa"		Solo
1999	Kastholhu	"Hiyyheyo Kameh Huregen"	Easa Shareef	Solo
1999	Kastholhu	"Mibinmathee Dhirihurumuge"	Easa Shareef	Solo
1999	Kastholhu	"Adugadha Nukuraashey"	Easa Shareef	Abdul Hannan Moosa Didi
1999	Kastholhu	"Vanee Haas Neyvaa"	Easa Shareef	Abdul Hannan Moosa Didi
1999	Kastholhu	"Rulhin Dhen Noolheyshey"	Easa Shareef	Abdul Hannan Moosa Didi
1999	Kastholhu	"Foaraanehey Baaru"	Easa Shareef	Abdul Hannan Moosa Didi
1999	Kastholhu	"Hiyy Mi Thelhilaaneyey"		Abdul Hannan Moosa Didi
1999	Kastholhu	"Hithugaavaa Loabi Dheynee"	Abdul Hannan Moosa Didi	Abdul Hannan Moosa Didi
1999	Raayaa	"Govaalee Loabin"	Tharaboozu Ahmed Riza	Abdul Hannan Moosa Didi
1999	Rukkuri	"Haadhahaa Gaathu Eku Ulhey Hiyyvey"	Boi Ahmed Khaleel	Solo
1999	Rukkuri	"Jaanaa Furaanain"	Boi Ahmed Khaleel	Ibrahim Rameez
1999	Vara	"Mithaa Dhaadhi Kaireegaa"	Kopee Mohamed Rasheedh	Solo
1999	Vara	"Dhurah Jehilee Rulheebaa Ey"	Kopee Mohamed Rasheedh	Kopee Ahmed Rasheedh
1999	Single	"Adhu Vaan Edheythee Bahdhal"		Imaadh Ismail
2000	Hinithun	"Thoonu Thoonu Rihumeh" (Version 1)	Ismail Abdul Qadhir	Solo
2000	Kathiriyaa	"Maazeege Sofuhaa"	Adam Haleem Adhnan	Solo
2000	Khareef	"Ran Loabi Gelluneemaa"	Tharaboozu Ahmed Riza	Solo
2000	Koadi	"Dhekilaa Hithey Vanee"	Easa Shareef	Ali Rameez
2000	Koadi	"Neyngeyhen Heelaafaa"	Easa Shareef	Abdul Hannan Moosa Didi
2000	Koadi	"Loabeege Aalam Dhekeyshey"	Easa Shareef	Saahir
2000	Laat	"Loa Furuney Vaguthun"	Easa Shareef	Solo
2000	Laat	"Meyrun Venehen"	Abdulla Afeef	Solo
2000	Laat	"Ladhuvethi Moonu Badhaluvaaney"	Abdulla Afeef	Ali Rameez
2000	Muraka	"Fennanee Mihiyy Edhey"		Abdul Baaree
2000	Namaves...	"Nudhaananhey Aadhey Mirey"		Solo
2000	Rasrana	"Asthaa Asthaa Paruwaanaa"	Adam Haleem Adhnan	Solo
2000	Rasrana	"Annanee Fenvaruvan"	Easa Shareef	Abdul Baaree
2000	Rukkuri 2	"Saadhaa Thi Moonaa Lolaa"	Easa Shareef	Ali Rameez
2000	Rukkuri 2	"Ulhunee Haadha Balaigenney"	Easa Shareef	Solo
2000	Rukkuri 2	"Kolhuneiy Kolhah Vee Loabi Dhen"	Boi Ahmed Khaleel	Solo
2000	Theyonaashi	"Medhu Raajje Therein Dhekifaa"		Solo
2000	Vedhun	"Foni Foni Raagun"	Boi Ahmed Khaleel	Solo
2001	Baaodi	"Heylaa Veemey Reyrey"		Solo
2001	Baaodi	"Ithubaaru Kuraashey Maafu Kurey"		Ahmed Rasheedh
2001	Dhunthari	"Nunidheyney Hama Fenifaa Dhongoma"	Ahmed Nashidh (Dharavandhoo)	Hussain Sobah
2001	Fattaru	"Thiya Aee Alun Gulhenhey"	Ismail Shakeeb	Abdul Baaree
2001	Gulfaam	"Han'dhaai Han'dhugaa Vaahaa"	Adam Haleem Adhnan	Ali Rasheedh (Stepin)
2001	Rukkuri 3	"Naasiraa Gaadhiraa" (Sagiko Ad)		Abdul Baaree
2001	Shoakh	"Vai Baaru Ehaa Veemaa"	Ismail Abdul Qadhir	Abdul Hannan Moosa Didi
2001	Single	"Haalu Ahaalee Loabivaathee Ey"	Easa Shareef	Umar Zahir
2001	Tharaanaa	"Mithuraaey Keiytherivaashey"	Adam Haleem Adhnan	Abdul Baaree
2002	Anaa	"Loabi Kuraa Hiyyvey"		Abdul Baaree
2002	Dhanvaru	"Dhanvaru Dhanvaru"	Ahmed Nashidh (Dharavandhoo)	Solo
2002	Dhonmanje	"Mihithun Abadhu Loabi Dhevidhaaney"	Adam Naseer Ibrahim	Abdul Baaree
2002	Jazbaath	"Thiya Khiyaal Kuraa Hiyy Veyey"	Adam Haleem Adhnan	Mukhthar Adam
2002	Leykokaa	"Fennanee Mihiyy Edhey"		Abdul Baaree
2002	Ran Han'dhu	"Ishqee Zuvaanaa"		Solo
2002	Ran Han'dhu	"Ekuveriyaa Ey Loluge Nooraa Ey"		Solo
2002	Ran Han'dhu	"Edhey Chaalu Thiyey Reetheege Raanee"		Ali Rameez
2002	Samaasa	"Asthaa Huree"	Abdulla Muaz Yoosuf	Solo
2002	Single	"Loabin Jaanu Hiley"		
2002	Sunquick Ad	"Geygaa Inee Nikan Hamajehilaigen"		Solo
2003	Billoori	"Hiyy Magey Kiyaadhemey"	Adam Haleem Adhnan	Hussain Sobah
2003	Billoori	"Hiyy Dhen Ei Bala Billoori Hey"		Ibrahim Amir
2003	Billoori	"Mihiree Rakivefa"		Ahmed Amir
2003	Billoori	"Haadha Loaiybey Heeleemaa"	Mausoom Shakir	Solo
2003	Himeyn Dhanvaru	"Hithuga Magey"	Ahmed Haleem	Hassan Ilham
2003	Inthizaarugai...	"Kalaa Loabin Vee Hunnaashey"	Boi Ahmed Khaleel	Ali Rameez
2003	Loabi Loabin	"Abadhu Kalaa Thi Dhey Ufaa"	Ahmed Saleem	Abdul Baaree
2003	Dheraha	"Heylaa Thibeyney Reyrey"		Massoodh Moosa Didi
2003	Huvafenun Dhusheemey	"Sirrey Miee Hithugaa"		Umar Zahir
2003	Rasmaa	"Thee Magey Jaan Edhey Pyaaraa Ey"		Hussain Sobah
2003	Reehchey Thi Moonu	"Heylaa Thibeyney Reyrey"		Massoodh Moosa Didi
2004	Ehan'dhaanugai...	"Neyngi Sirrun Kalaa"	Easa Shareef	Solo
2004	Fenmeeru	"Ulhe Ulhe Nidhi Lolakah Naey"	Ahmed Nashidh (Dharavandhoo)	Hussain Sobah
2004	Ihusaas	"Aadhey Hithaa"		Solo
2004	Ihusaas	"Nashan Magey Hiyy Edheyey"		Solo
2004	Ihusaas	"Hussaribai Vee Thedhey"		Solo
2004	Ihusaas	"O Thiee Zuvaanvi Moonekey Nayaa"	Adam Haleem Adhnan	Solo
2004	Ihusaas	"Kiyaadhevvavaa Zuvaaneh Kobaa"	Adam Haleem Adhnan	Abdul Baaree
2004	Ihusaas	"Hiyy Thalhuvan Dhen Noolhey"	Easa Shareef	Ahmed Amir
2004	Ihusaas	"Hiyydhathi Nukurey"		Mukhthar Adam
2004	Ihusaas	"Loabeege Kan'dugaa"		Ali Rameez
2004	Ihusaas	"Bunelabalaashey Loabivaa"		Mohamed Huzam
2004	Ihusaas	"Nuhee Nuhee"	Ahmed Haleem	Mohamed Fazeel
2004	Maamuige Reythah	"Neiy Ma Dhaane Manzileh"	Abdul Hameed	Solo
2004	Maamuige Reythah	"Kaireegaa Kalaa Netheemaa"	Easa Shareef	Solo
2004	Mariyaadhu	"Dheyshey Jaan"		Mohamed Huzam
2004	Mariyaadhu	"Fissanee Mihiyythoa"		Abdul Baaree
2004	Saahil	"Thiya Chaalu Lolugaa"		Solo
2004	Shabunam	"Mee Hitachi"		Imaadh Ismail
2004	Thibaa	"Kuri Hadhiyaa Kobaahey"	Ahmed Nashidh (Dharavandhoo)	Abdul Baaree
2004	Thibaa	"Aiylan Noolhey Saahibaa"	Abdulla Muaz Yoosuf	Solo
2004	Single	"Ivuney Ivuney"	Maumoon Abdul Gayoom	Solo
2004	Vidhaathari	"Loabeegaa Jehifaa"	Abdul Muhaimin	Ahmed Amir
2004	Yaaraa	"Neiyhe Gulhun"	Ahmed Nashidh (Dharavandhoo)	Mohamed Zaidh
2005	Dhilaasaa	"Alathu Loabi Asthaa"	Adam Haleem Adhnan	Mohamed Huzam
2005	Fari Goma	"Han'dhuvaru Dhey Mi Nala"		Mohamed Huzam
2005	Fari Goma	"Thaqudheerugaa"		Mohamed Huzam
2005	Fura Dhanvaru	"Saahibaa"	Shareefa Fakhry	Solo
2005	Yaaraa 2	"Hutteythoa Kalaa"	Ahmed Nashidh (Dharavandhoo)	Abdul Baaree
2005	Zuvaanaa	"Thee Ey Hoadhaa Mithuraa Chaalu"	Adam Haleem Adhnan	Abdul Baaree
2005	Ehan'dhaanugai...	"Khiyaaleh Faalhu Kolleemaa"		Solo
2005	Hamahimeyn	"Hithah Feney"	Coco Hassan Haleem	Mohamed Fazeel
2006	Bichaanaa	"Hithuge Ran Loabi Thee Ey"		Hassan Ilham
2006	Hiyy Dheewaanaa 3	"Hiyy Aawaaraakoh"	Ahmed Nashidh (Dharavandhoo)	Mukhthar Adam
2006	Jismu	"Hiyy Mihaaru Vejje Kairi"	Ahmed Nashidh (Dharavandhoo)	Mumthaz Moosa
2006	Keehve..?	"Vejjey Mihiyy Zakham"	Adam Haleem Adhnan	Solo
2006	Kisthee	"Mithuraa Ey Hiyy Hulhuvaalaa"	Adam Haleem Adhnan	Abdul Baaree
2006	Kisthee	"Neyngi Kisthee"		Hassan Ilham
2006	Mihan'dhaanugai...	"Roalhi Vai Jehenyaa"	Boi Ahmed Khaleel	Solo
2006	Mi Hithun	"Raaguthakun Foni Roohee"	Adam Haleem Adhnan	Abdul Baaree
2006	Mi Hithun	"Hiyy Edhey Varun"		Imaadh Ismail
2006	Oh' Salhi	"Bigaraa Ey"	Adam Naseer Ibrahim	Hussain Ali
2006	Oh' Salhi	"Beehumun Ufaaveyhey"	Ahmed Nashidh (Dharavandhoo)	Solo
2006	Yaaraa 3	"Thoonu Lolaa Burusoora"	Ahmed Nashidh (Dharavandhoo)	Abdul Baaree
2006	Yaaraa 3	"Seedhaa Thiyahen Dhen Nubalaashey"	Ahmed Nashidh (Dharavandhoo)	Abdul Baaree
2007	Hiyy Dheebalaa	"Thiya Reethikamaa"	Ahmed Nashidh (Dharavandhoo)	Hussain Ali
2007	Salaamey...	"Naazunee O Magey Naazunee"	Ahmed Nashidh (Dharavandhoo)	Abdul Baaree
2007	Thihan'dhaanugai...	"Zuvaan Zuvaan Loabivaa"	Hussain Rasheedh	Solo
2008	Hiyy Dheewaanaa 4	"Hithaa Ey Loabi Dheyshey"	Shareefa Fakhry	Mumthaz Moosa
2008	Hiyy Dheewaanaa 4	"Hissu Dhey Filaa"	Shareefa Fakhry	Abdul Baaree
2008	Hiyy Dhemey Loabin	"Rey Dhusheemey Huvafenugaa"	Adam Haleem Adhnan	Mumthaz Moosa
2008	Thihan'dhaanugai Remix	"Fiya Reethi Nalavi Muniyaa"	Ogaru Ibrahim Waheedh	Solo
2008	Maumoon 2008	"Qaumu Othee Maumoonaa Ekugaa"		Rafiyath Rameeza, Shaheedha Riffath
2008	Maumoon 2008	"Qaumee Zamaanee Thauleemee"		Rafiyath Rameeza
2008	Maumoon 2008	"Qaumee Maslahathah"		Hussain Sobah, Rafiyath Rameeza
2008	Maumoon 2008	"Mi Maumoon Hovan Hovan"		Hussain Sobah, Mohamed Farhad, Rafiyath Rameeza
2009	Feniliyas	"Vaaneybaa Loabi Dhen Thi Haasil"		Solo
2009	Fari Kamana	"Hiyy Dheyhaa Dheewaanaa Vejjeyey"	Ahmed Haleem	Mumthaz Moosa
2009	Hiyy Dheebalaa 2	"Accident Kohfathaa"	Ahmed Nashidh (Dharavandhoo)	Abdul Baaree
2009	Yaaraa 4	"Faathimaa Huttey Alhey"	Ahmed Nashidh (Dharavandhoo)	Mohamed Abdul Ghanee
2009	Yaaraa 4	"Nuveythoa Hiyy Thi Aalaa"	Ahmed Nashidh (Dharavandhoo)	Mohamed Abdul Ghanee
2009	Yaaraa 4	"Thi Burusoora Fenifaa"	Ahmed Nashidh (Dharavandhoo)	Abdul Baaree
2011	Vasmeeru	"Furihama Reyekey"		Solo
2011	Vasmeeru	"Asthaa Libijjey Sihun"		Solo
2011	Vasmeeru	"Keiytherikan Nethidhanee"		Mumthaz Moosa
2011	Hiyy Dheewaanaa 5	"Loabin Ma Heeleema"		Ibrahim Saeedh
2011	Leveythee Mineyvaa	"Thee Magey Jaan Edhey Pyaaraa Ey"		Hussain Sobah
2012	Edhuvasthah	"Roalaa Roalaa Innanveehey"	Shareef	Solo
2012	Loabivumakee	"Loabivumakee Mieehey"	Ismail Shameem	Solo
2012	Loabivumakee	"Thiyaee Loaiybey Magey"	Ismail Shameem	Solo
2012	Loabivumakee	"Loaiybah Mihithun Eba Edheyey"	Ismail Shameem	Solo
2012	Loabivumakee	"Kalaa Thee Bunan Furihama Mithurey"	Ismail Shameem	Abdul Baaree
2012	Loabivumakee	"Aashiqun Maushooqunaa"	Ismail Shameem	Hassan Ilham
2012	Loabivumakee	"Aadhey Yaaraa Loabi Zuvaanaa"	Ismail Shameem	Hussain Ali
2012	Loabivumakee	"Han'dhaan Aavanee Ey"	Ismail Shameem	Ibrahim Saeedh
2012	Loabivumakee	"Thiya Malugaa Evaa Karugan'du"	Ismail Shameem	Ibrahim Zaid Ali
2013	Hiyy Dheebalaa 3	"Kihineh Veethoa"	Ahmed Nashidh (Dharavandhoo)	Hussain Sobah
2013	Hiyy Dheewaanaa 6	"Dhanvaru Dhanvaru"	Ahmed Nashidh (Dharavandhoo)	Solo
2013	Hiyy Dheewaanaa 6	"Ninjeh Naadhey Heylaa Hoadhey"		Mohamed Abdul Ghanee
2013	Hiyy Dheewaanaa 6	"Vey Hiyy Dheewaanaa"		Ali Abdulla (Komandoo)
2017	Ran Han'dhaanugai: S02	"Mirey Mi Dhanvarugaa"		Reehan
2017	Ran Han'dhaanugai: S02	"Loabivumakee Mieehey"	Ismail Shameem	Abdulla Sodhiq
2017	Qaumee Dhuvas 1439: Bahuruva	"Keroomaa Khidhumatheh Qaumah"	Abdul Azeez Jamaal Aboobakuru	Hassan Tholaaq, Yoosuf Shimaz, Ahmed Yasir
2020	Single	"Ilaahee Mibin"	Abdul Rasheedh Hussain	Various

=== Religious / Madhaha ===
Year	Album/Single	Madhaha	Lyricist(s)	Co-Artist(s)
N/A	N/A	"Yaa Allah"		Solo
N/A	N/A	"Noorey Ei Enme Maaiy"		Solo
2002	Abaarana-1	"Mi Dheenuge Binaa Vee"	Kopee Mohamed Rasheedh	Solo
2002	Abaarana-1	"Lavvaashi Salawaathaa Salaam"	Kopee Mohamed Rasheedh	Solo
2017	PSM Madhaha Album	"Hathaavees"		Solo

== Filmography ==
Year	Title	Role	Notes	Ref(s)
2010	Veeraana	Herself	Special appearance in the promotional song "Veeraana"	

== Accolades ==
Year	Award	Category	Nominated work	Result	Ref(s)
1998	Aafathis Awards - 1997	Best Female Playback Singer	"Uff Heevanee" - Fathis Handhuvaru	Won	
2001	National Award of Recognition	Performing Arts - Singing		Won	
2007	1st Miadhu Crystal Award	Best Female Playback Singer	"Fari Loa" - Hiyy Dheewana 3	Won	
2008	2nd Miadhu Crystal Award	Best Female Playback Singer		Won	
2008	5th Gaumee Film Awards	Best Female Playback Singer	"Magey Loabivaaey" - Hithuge Edhun	Won	
