= Mohamed Yunaan =

Maldivian film actor

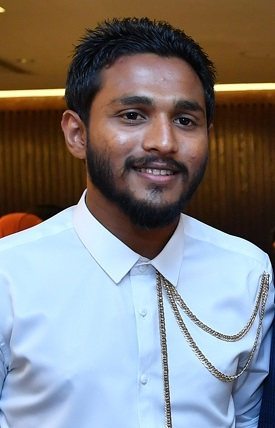
- Yunaan at Niuma Mohamed's Silver Jubilee celebration event, 2019
- Born: 26 May 1991 (age 35); GDh. Hoandedhdhoo
- Occupation: Actor
- Years active: 2017–2020
- Spouse: Fathimath Rihula
- Children: 2

Mohamed Yunaan (born 26 May 1991) is a Maldivian former film actor.

== Career ==
Prior to his official career debut with Aishath Rishmy-directed romantic drama Bos (2017), Yunaan acted in few office teledramas. In Bos he portrayed the role of an IT specialized intelligent blackmailer who turns into a depressed man following the downturn of love. Penned and produced by Fathimath Nahula, Yunaan termed the film as his "dream project" since he was raised in "Nahula's melodramatic universe". Nahula's selection to rope in Yunaan as the male lead was met with controversy, although she considered it as the "most firm and best decision" she took for the film. Upon release, the film and his character met with mixed reviews from critics. Aishath Fareeha reviewing from Sun appraised his performance and noted that his "innocent face" is a fortune to deliver the "right emotion". However, Avas in its film review wrote: "Even though this is his debut performance, I would personally rate a zero to his acting ability as he fails to bring forth the required emotion". The film emerged as the highest grossing Maldivian film of 2017.

In 2019, he again collaborated with Rishmy for Ravee Farooq-directed web television series Ehenas which follows the experiences of a long-term domestic and sexually abused male victim and how he faces the societal obstacles of marriage. The series and his performance as a bully received mainly positive reviews from critics. Aishath Maahaa reviewing from Dho? noted the improvement in his performance compared to his previous venture.

== Controversy ==
In July 2020, Yunaan alongside his wife grabbed national attention with an emotional plea for financial assistance for medical treatment for their baby daughter in front of the presidential residence. Soon after, there were accusations by a fellow actor for the misuse of the financial aid for their personal gain. On 3 October 2020, several reports in the media accused the couple of having "forced sexual relations" with a 15-year-old boy, who reportedly is a member of their family.

== Filmography ==
=== Feature film ===
Year	Title	Role	Notes	Ref(s)
2017	Bos	Raidh		
2021	Faree	Suhail		

=== Television and web series ===
Year	Title	Role	Notes	Ref(s)
2019–2020	Ehenas	Hamdhan	Main role; 22 episodes	

=== Short film ===
Year	Title	Role	Notes	Ref(s)
2016	Dhekey Goiyy			
2018	Dhathuru	Hussain		
