= Ahmed Nabeel Mohamed =

Maldivian singer

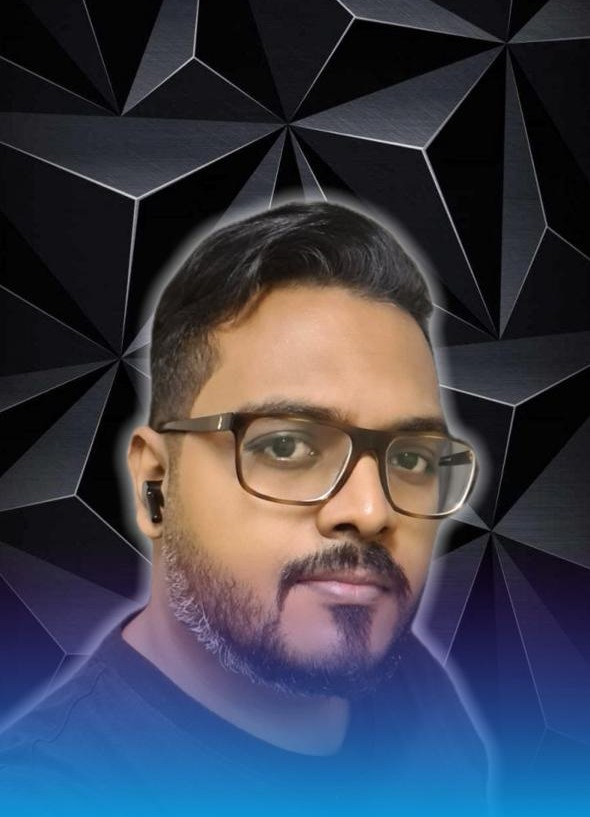
- Born: 5 October 1992 (age 33); Male', Maldives
- Occupation: Playback singer
- Years active: 2000–present
- Musical career
- Genres: Pop; filmi; electronic
- Instrument: Vocals

Ahmed Nabeel Mohamed (born 05 October 1992) is a Maldivian singer.

== Career ==
Ahmed Nabeel Mohamed was born on 05 October 1992. His mother, Fathimath Zoona, is a well-known Maldivian singer and is regarded as one of the country's most successful female vocalists. Influenced by his mother, Nabeel began singing at a very young age. At the age of eight, he recorded his first film song, "Bappaa Aimaa Aharen Vaa Ufaa", for Naaummeedhu (2000). He later recorded other songs under the direction of Fathimath Nahula, including "Heesamaasaa Rattehinnaa" from the film Kalaayaanulaa (2003) and "Mihiree Rakivefa" for the album Billoori (2003), both performed alongside his mother.

After a nine-year gap, Nabeel returned with a duet performance alongside Rafiyath Rameeza in Ehan'dhaanugai Duet (2009) performing a remake of the classic "Naanaavee Seedhaa Loabi", originally sung by Naifaru Dhohokko and Jeymu Dhonkamana. In 2016, he auditioned for the first season of Maldivian Idol and was selected for the subsequent round before withdrawing. He re-auditioned the following year second season, advancing to the "Top 6" before being eliminated. Nabeel continued his playback career with notable songs in films such as "Hiyy Avasvaa Goiy Viyey" from Bos(2017) and "Salhiyey Thiya Thoonu Balaalun" from Sorry. For his song in Bos, he received the Gaumee Film Award for Best Male Playback Singer.

== Discography ==
=== Feature film ===
Year	Film	Song	Lyricist(s)	Co-artist(s)	Notes
2000	Naaummeedhu	"Bappaa Aimaa Aharen Vaa Ufaa"	Mausoom Shakir	Abdul Baaree	
2003	Kalaayaanulaa	"Heesamaasaa Rattehinnaa"	Mausoom Shakir	Mariyam Enash Sinan, Fathimath Zoona	
2017	Bos	"Hiyy Avasvaa Goiy Viyey"	Mausoom Shakir	Solo	
2025	Sorry	"Veynee Karunain Loa Foavey"	Adam Haleem Adnan	Mariyam Enash Sinan	
2025	Sorry	"Salhiyey Thiya Thoonu Balaalun"	Mausoom Shakir	Aminath Raaya Ashraf	
2025	Sorry	"Salhiyey Thiya Thoonu Balaalun" (Remix Version)	Mausoom Shakir	Aminath Raaya Ashraf	Appears in Soundtrack album
2026	Majunoon	"Thiyaee Magey"	Abdulla Shahidh (Teddy)	Aminath Raaya Ashraf	

=== Television and Web Series ===
Year	Title	Song	Lyricist(s)	Co-artist(s)
2003	Edhuvas En'buri Annaanenama	"Mihiree Rakivefa"	Mausoom Shakir	Ahmed Amir, Fathimath Zoona

=== Non-film songs ===
Year	Album/single	Song	Lyricist(s)	Co-artist(s)
2002	Single	"Dhoani Dhoani Odi Furaane"		Solo
2003	Billoori	"Mihiree Rakivefa"	Mausoom Shakir	Ahmed Amir, Fathimath Zoona
2009	Ehan'dhaanugai Duet	"Naanaavee Seedhaa Loabi"		Rafiyath Rameeza
2012	Loabivumakee	"Thiyey Masthuge Bahaaraa Gulhey Farikamey"	Ismail Shameem	Rafiyath Rameeza
2012	Loabivumakee	"Ranzamaaney Asthaa Ai Miee"		Solo

== Accolades ==
Year	Award	Category	Nominated work	Result	Ref(s)
2019	9th Gaumee Film Awards	Best Male Playback Singer	"Hiyy Avas Vaa Goiy" - Bos	Won	
