= Bos (film) =

- Official film poster
- Directed by: Aishath Rishmy
- Screenplay by: Fathimath Nahula
- Produced by: Fathimath Nahula
- Starring: Mariyam Azza; Mohamed Yunaan; Ibrahim Jihad; Fathimath Azifa
- Cinematography: Hussain Adnan; Mohamed Ishan
- Edited by: Ravee Farooq
- Music by: Fathuhulla Shakeel
- Distributed by: Crystal Entertainment
- Release date: October 31, 2017
- Running time: 186 minutes
- Country: Maldives
- Language: Dhivehi

Bos (transl. Kiss) is a 2017 Maldivian romantic film directed by Aishath Rishmy. Produced by Fathimath Nahula under Crystal Entertainment, the film stars Mariyam Azza, Mohamed Yunaan, Ibrahim Jihad and Fathimath Azifa in pivotal roles. The film was released on 31 October 2017.

== Premise ==
Raaidh (Mohamed Yunaan), a smart IT technician and A professional hacker is dejected by his high-standard friend, June (Fathimath Azifa) who is in a romantic relationship with a wealthy young man, Maaish (Ibrahim Jihad). The latter's father (Ali Shameel) arranges Maaish's marriage with Ibaa (Mariyam Azza), the daughter of a family friend who lost his life recently and hires Raaidh to take care of Ibaa in her trauma. Maaish agrees to marry Ibaa for a personal gain while Raaidh accepts Shameel's offer to avenge on June. As days pass by, Raaidh and Ibaa slowly get attached towards each other.

In order to help Ibaa recover from trauma Raaidh take her to his island. There Raaidh's mother mistake Ibaa to be Raaidh's girlfriend and become happy thinking Raaidh is going to marry Ibaa. During the trip Raaidh and Ibaa developed feelings for each other but could not dare to express. When they returned Maaish proposed Ibaa for marriage and the eventually get married upsetting Raaidh.

After marriage Ibaa's health deteriorate and Raaidh came to the it was Maaish and his father who did this to her in order to gain her property. Raaidh decided to donate his liver which after a lot of complications become success and Raaidh unites with Ibaa

The film ends with Ibaa and Raaidh getting married and living a happily life with their child.

== Cast ==
- Mariyam Azza as Ibaa
- Mohamed Yunaan as Raaidh
- Ibrahim Jihad as Maaish
- Fathimath Azifa as June
- Ali Azim as Abo
- Ali Shameel as Maish's father
- Koyya Hassan Manik as Raaidh's father
- Ahmed Shiyam as Zahid
- Ashraf Mohamed as Dr. Aamir
- Fathimath Ibrahim as Raaidh's mother
- Ahmed Niyaz as Mahdi
- Hussain Shadyaan Hassan as Doctor
- Maria Teresa Pagano as Foreign Doctor

== Development ==
Initially, it was planned to commence filming in February. However, it was delayed to July due to reservation issues from the resort for the initial schedule. After finalizing the cast and locations, filming commenced on 13 June 2017. The majority of the scenes were shot in L. Reveries. In February 2017, it was confirmed that Mariyam Azza and Ibrahim Jihad will star in the film. After announcing the project, Nahula stated that, with Bos she will launch a "fresh face" to the industry and is "hunting for a director". On 8 March 2017, during the premier event of the film Vishka, Nahula offered actress Aishath Rishmy to direct the film, which she accepted on 10 April 2017. Except for the lead actor, the rest of cast including Fathimath Azifa and Ali Azim were confirmed by the director on 2 June 2017. On 8 July 2017, it was revealed that actor Mohamed Yunaan will make his debut in this film.

== Soundtrack ==
Track listing
No.	Title	Lyrics	Music	Singer(s)	Length
1.	"Mi Hiyy Edhey Goiy Nuvanee"	Mausoom Shakir	Munaz Zubair	Hamoodh Ibrahim, Rafiyath Rameeza	04:43
2.	"Veyn Thakun Dhin Hithi Maazee"	Adam Haleem Adnan	Ibrahim Zaid Ali	Shalabee Ibrahim, Mariyam Ashfa	06:39
3.	"Bos Dheyhaa Loabivey"	Mausoom Shakir	Ismail Adheel	Mohamed Abdul Ghanee, Aishath Maain Rasheed	04:36
4.	"Mi Vaavaru"	Mausoom Shakir	Ibrahim Zaid Ali	Ibrahim Zaid Ali	04:59
5.	"Loabin Gos Bos Dheyn"	Mausoom Shakir	Hussain Sobah	Mohamed Abdul Ghanee	05:21
6.	"Hiyy Avas Vaa Goiyy Viyey"	Mausoom Shakir	Fathuhullah Abdul Fathah	Ahmed Nabeel Mohamed	03:54
7.	"Aharenge Hiyy Himeynvaan"	Mohamed Abdul Ghanee	Abdul Baasith	Mohamed Abdul Ghanee	05:16
8.	"Edhemey Rahumaiy"	Mausoom Shakir	Ibrahim Zaid Ali	Ibrahim Zaid Ali	05:06
Total length:					40:36

== Release and reception ==
The poster of the film was unveiled on 8 July 2017. The soundtrack album and trailer of the film was released on 8 September 2020. Initially, it was planned to release the film on 24 September 2017, but the premier date was pushed further a week as it clashes with the second term examination period. The release date of the film was later finalized for 31 September 2017.

Upon release, the film received mixed reviews from critics. Aishath Fareeha from Sun applauded the work by director Aishath Rishmy for presenting a "predictable storyline from a stereotyped genre in an engaging manner" with commendable performances by Fathimath Azifa, Ibrahim Jihad and debutant Mohamed Yunaan. In a special mention Fareeha noted the comical role played by Ali Azim for saturating the film from being over-emotional. Avas in its film review criticized the film for its depressive nature and wrote: "Luckily, actors like Azifa, Jihad and Azim, with their brilliant performances, were able to save this titanic from sinking in an ocean of tears". Despite the mixed reviews, the film emerged as the highest grossing Maldivian film of 2017.

== Accolades ==
Award	Category	Recipient(s) and nominee(s)	Result	Ref(s)
9th Gaumee Film Awards	Best Supporting Actor	Ibrahim Jihad	Nominated	
9th Gaumee Film Awards	Best Supporting Actress	Fathimath Azifa	Nominated	
9th Gaumee Film Awards	Best Original Song	Fathuhulla Abdul Fatthah for "Hiyy Avas Vaa Goiy"	Won	
9th Gaumee Film Awards	Best Lyricist	Mausoom Shakir for "Hiyy Avas Vaa Goiy"	Won	
9th Gaumee Film Awards	Best Playback Singer – Male	Ahmed Nabeel Mohamed for "Hiyy Avas Vaa Goiy"	Won	
9th Gaumee Film Awards	Best Playback Singer – Male	Mohamed Abdul Ghanee for "Aharenge Hiyy Himeynvey"	Nominated	
9th Gaumee Film Awards	Best Cinematography	Hussain Adnan, Mohamed Ishan	Nominated	
