= Fahuneyvaa =

- Official film poster
- Directed by: Fathimath Nahula
- Written by: Fathimath Nahula
- Screenplay by: Fathimath Nahula
- Starring: Hussain Sobah; Mariyam Nisha; Jamsheedha Ahmed
- Edited by: Ali Musthafa
- Music by: Mohamed Ahmed
- Production company: Dash Studio
- Release date: 1998
- Country: Maldives
- Language: Dhivehi

Fahuneyvaa is a 1998 Maldivian family drama film written and directed by Fathimath Nahula. Produced under Dash Studio, the film stars Hussain Sobah, Mariyam Nisha and Jamsheedha Ahmed in pivotal roles.

The film marks Nahula's debut direction after working as an assistant director in Laila (1997). It received critical acclaim and was a hit commercially by screening twenty six housefull shows at cinema.

== Plot ==
Ziyan Ali (Hussain Sobah) and Aishath Haifa (Jamsheedha Ahmed) are prominent stage performers and childhood friends turned lovers. Haifa was offered a course of voice training from Australia for six months and she hesitantly accepts. Bored at home, Ziyan decides to distract himself by visiting an island on his friend Ahmed's (Ahmed Saeed) request. There he meets a deaf-mute girl Fazeela (Mariyam Nisha) and starts following her. They initiate a romantic relationship despised by her father. However, Ziyan marries Fazeela and breaks the news to his father but he decide to hid the truth from Haifa and family.

Haifa returns from Australia and publicly announces her engagement. Ziyan's father, Zubair begged him to get back to Haifa and abandon Fazeela. He involuntarily marries Haifa. Meanwhile, Haifa migrates to another island with her father. Haifa and Ziyan were inclined to take some days off work and enjoy a vacation at an island, the same island Fazeela moved to. She was assigned to greet them on arrival and was devastated to see Ziyan with another girl. The situation worsen when she was allotted as the cook in their house. The next day, Haifa and Ziyan leaves to Male' and Fazeela discovers about her pregnancy.

Five years later, Haifa return to the island after a stage show at a nearby island and she insisted to stay at Fazeela's house. There she meets Fazeela's daughter and discovers the guitar she had gifted to Ziyan but believed it to be of someone else's. When Haifa asked about the father of Fazeela's daughter, she brought torn pieces of a portrait which unveils to be the face of Ziyan. On returning Male' Haifa admits of her understanding about Ziyan's affair. Zubair owns up the blame and ask forgiveness from Haifa. Ziyan and Haifa meets his daughter at the hospital and visited Fazeela at her deathbed.

== Cast ==
- Hussain Sobah as Ziyan Ali
- Jamsheedha Ahmed as Aishath Haifa
- Mariyam Nisha as Fazeela
- Koyya Hassan Manik as Zubair Ali
- Ahmed Saeed as Ahmed
- Abdul Raheem as Haifa Father
- Abdul Sattar as Doctor
- Mariyam Azza as Aishath Haifa (Special appearance)

== Soundtrack ==
Track listing
No.	Title	Lyrics	Singer(s)	Length
1.	"Bunedheyn Dhathi Sirreh"	Easa Shareef	Ali Rameez, Fathimath Zoona
2.	"Ishaaraaiyhey Kuree"	Ahmed Haleem	Mohamed Huzam
3.	"Thikhiyaalugaa"	Ahmed Haleem	Ali Rameez, Shifa Thaufeeq
4.	"Dhevilaagandu Jehi Fithuneema"	Easa Shareef	Umar Zahir, Shifa Thaufeeq
5.	"Dhekefeemey Beevi Manzar"	Boi Ahmed Khaleel	Fathimath Zoona, Ali Rameez
6.	"Fahuneyvaa"	Mausoom Shakir	Abdul Sameeu, Fathimath Zoona
