= Edhuvas En'buri Annaanenama =

Maldivian television series

- Written by: Fathimath Nahula
- Screenplay by: Fathimath Nahula
- Directed by: Fathimath Nahula
- Starring: Yoosuf Shafeeu; Jamsheedha Ahmed; Mohamed Manik
- Music by: Hussain Sobah
- Country of origin: Maldives
- Original language: Divehi

Production
- Cinematography: Mohamed Siyaz

Original release
- Release: November 4 – December 2, 2003

Edhuvas En'buri Annaanenama is a Maldivian social drama television series written and directed by Fathimath Nahula. It stars Yoosuf Shafeeu, Jamsheedha Ahmed and Mohamed Manik in main roles while Koyya Hassan Manik and Aminath Rasheedha appears in supporting roles. The series consisting of five episodes revolves around three friends who failed in love choose a destructive path and later hoping to redeem themselves.

== Cast and characters ==
=== Main ===
- Yoosuf Shafeeu as Niyaz
- Jamsheedha Ahmed as Ina
- Mohamed Manik as Husham
- Koyya Hassan Manik as Ina's father
- Aminath Rasheedha as Niyaz's mother

=== Recurring ===
- Mohamed Faisal as Adam
- Shahid Mohamed
- Zareer
- Mohamed Shan
- Ahmed Yaamin
- Aafee
- Nathif
- Mauroof Ahmed
- Hassan Naeem
- Qadir
- Ishaq Umar
- Mauroofa Hassan

=== Guest ===
- Suneetha Ali (special appearance in the song "Hiyy Magey Kiyaadhemey")
- Ahmed Shimau as Doctor

== Episodes ==
No.	Title	Directed by	Original release date
1	"Episode 1"	Fathimath Nahula	November 4, 2003
Niyaz, a diffident young man, is deeply in love with Ina, but too reluctant to propose to her. Before he could make any obvious move, Niyaz is affirmed that he has lost Ina to their childhood best friend, Husham, who is also secretly in love with her. Accepting defeat in love, Niyaz chooses a destructive path and becomes a drug abuser. Husham pays a visit to Niyaz to pass a message from Ina, only to discover his drug addiction.
2	"Episode 2"	Fathimath Nahula	November 11, 2003
As an attempt of revenge, Niyaz successfully lures Husham into the drug network. Ina requests Niyaz to meet her one last time, where they clear the misunderstanding between them and profess their love towards each other. Niyaz finds guilty of his drug addiction and for inviting Husham into the pitfall. Knowing the true colors of Niyaz, Ina's father declares his disapproval for their relationship.
3	"Episode 3"	Fathimath Nahula	November 18, 2003
Niyaz's mother finds out his situation and agrees to help him at any cost. As advised by his mother, Niyaz confesses about drug addiction to Ina and she concurs to help him overcome his addiction, much to her father's disappointment. Hoping to get some support, Ina goes to Husham only to find him in a worse situation. Niyaz is reluctant to join a rehab, fearing he might lose Ina in the process. As a token of affirmation, Ina agrees to marry him on the promise he seeks help from rehabilitation.
4	"Episode 4"	Fathimath Nahula	November 25, 2003
Witnessing the withdrawal symptoms, Ina lashes out to Husham for being a terrible friend. Niyaz departs to rehab and Husham joins him in the journey. Few days later, Ina is found to be pregnant. After successfully completing their rehab sessions, Niyaz and Husham return home and are welcomed by their family and loved ones. However, their happiness is short-lived, as Niyaz and Ina's child is diagnosed with sudden infant death syndrome.
5	"Episode 5"	Fathimath Nahula	December 2, 2003
Soon after, the baby passes away creating a distance between Niyaz and Ina. Feeling guilty of his child's demise, Niyaz goes back to the drug network, breaking all hopes of Ina. Adam's drug network is busted and Niyaz is arrested in the process. Niyaz divorces Ina before he is taken into police custody. Three years later, Niyaz returns home, with high hopes for his future, only to find Ina happily married to Husham.

== Soundtrack ==
Track listing
No.	Title	Lyrics	Singer(s)	Length
1.	"Hiyy Magey Kiyaadhemey"	Adam Haleem Adhnan	Fathimath Zoona, Hussain Sobah
2.	"Mihiree Rakivefa"	Mausoom Shakir	Fathimath Zoona, Ahmed Amir, Ahmed Nabeel Mohamed
3.	"Edhuvas En'buri Annaanenama"	Adam Haleem Adhnan	Hussain Sobah, Shaheedha Mohamed

== Release and reception ==
The first episode of the series was released on 4 November 2003, on the occasion of Ramadan 1424. Upon release, the series mostly received positive reviews from critics and audience alike. Apart from the performance of the actors, writer and director Fathimath Nahula's work to blend the social message in a love triangle was lauded by the film viewers.
