= Gaumee Film Award for Best Male Playback Singer =

- Awarded for: Best Male Playback Singer
- Country: Maldives
- Presented by: National Centre for the Arts

The Gaumee Film Award for Best Male Playback Singer is given as part of the Gaumee Film Awards for Maldivian Films.

The award was first given in 1995. Here is a list of the award winners and the nominees of the respective award ceremonies.

== Winners and nominees ==
| Year | Photos of winners | Singer | Film and song | Ref(s) |
|---|---|---|---|---|
| 1st (1995) | | Mohamed Huzam | "Loabi Maquboolu Nuvee" – Jazubaathu | |
| 1st (1995) | | No Other Nominee | | |
| 2nd (1997) | | Umar Zahir | "Mooney Thiee Hiyy Edhey" - Haqqu | |
| 2nd (1997) | | No Other Nominee | | |
| 3rd (2007) | Not Available | | | |
| 4th (2007) | | Abdul Hannan Moosa Didi | "Ossifavaa Iru Eree Ey" - Edhi Edhi Hoadheemey | |
| 4th (2007) | | No Other Nominee | | |
| 5th (2008) | | Hussain Ali | "Shikaayathekey" - Hiyani | |
| 5th (2008) | | No Other Nominee | | |
| 6th (2015) | | Mohamed Abdul Ghanee | "Bunaa Hiyy Vey" - Zalzalaa En'buri Aun | |
| 6th (2015) | | Ibrahim Zaid Ali | "Kon Kahala Lolhumeh" - Heyonuvaane | |
| 6th (2015) | | Mohamed Abdul Ghanee | "Vee Banavefaa Adhu Falhuvefaa" - Veeraana | |
| 6th (2015) | | Mumthaz Moosa | "Hiyy Rohvaanulaa" - Hiyy Rohvaanulaa | |
| 6th (2015) | | Mumthaz Moosa | "Hithu Vindhaa" - Dhin Veynuge Hithaamaigaa | |
| 7th (2016) | | Mohamed Abdul Ghanee | "Loabivaa Ey" – Hiyy Yaara Dheefa | |
| 7th (2016) | | Abdul Hannan Moosa Didi | "Inthizaarey" – Kuhveriakee Kaakuhey? | |
| 7th (2016) | | Ibrahim Zaid Ali | "Dheyshey Naa" – Hiyy Yaara Dheefa | |
| 7th (2016) | | Mohamed Abdul Ghanee | "Vejjey Fanaa" – Hiyy Yaara Dheefa | |
| 7th (2016) | | Moosa Samau | "Thiya Moonah" – Mihashin Furaana Dhandhen | |
| 8th (2017) | | Ahmed Nashid | "Thakurah Baheh" - Hulhudhaan | |
| 8th (2017) | | Ahmed Furugan | "Noon Noon Nudhey" - Vaashey Mashaa Ekee | |
| 8th (2017) | | Ahmed Ibrahim | "Gandhee Huvaa" - Ahsham | |
| 8th (2017) | | Mohamed Abdul Ghanee | "Ummeedh" - Vafaatheri Kehiveriya | |
| 8th (2017) | | Shammoon Mohamed | "Gellifa" - Emme Fahu Vindha Jehendhen | |
| 9th (2019) | | Ahmed Nabeel Mohamed | "Hiyy Avas Vaa Goiy" - Bos | |
| 9th (2019) | | Hussain Shifan | "Dhin Ufaa" - Dhevansoora | |
| 9th (2019) | | Mohamed Aalam Latheef | "Loabivaa Ey" - Mee Loaybakee | |
| 9th (2019) | | Mohamed Abdul Ghanee | "Aharenge Hiyy Himeynvey" - Bos | |
| 9th (2019) | | Shammoon Mohamed | "Dhuniye Dhauruve" - Vakin Loabin | |

== See also ==
- Gaumee Film Awards
