= Ehenas =

Maldivian drama web television series

- Genre: Drama
- Based on: Ehenas Hama Loabiveyey by Ahmed Iqbal
- Written by: Ahmed Iqbal
- Screenplay by: Ahmed Iqbal
- Directed by: Ravee Farooq
- Starring: Mohamed Vishal; Aishath Rishmy; Fathimath Sara Adam; Mohamed Yunaan; Sheela Najeeb
- Narrated by: Ameena Mohamed
- Music by: Fathhulla Shakeel Hussain

Production
- Producer: Ahmed Iqbal
- Cinematography: Samah Ibrahim (Season 1); Shinaah Ibrahim (Season 2)
- Editors: Ravee Farooq; Shinaah Ibrahim
- Running time: 23-48 minutes
- Production companies: IQ Productions; R2Z Productions; R Squared Studio

Original release
- Network: Baiskoafu
- Release: July 16, 2019 – September 25, 2020

Ehenas is a Maldivian drama web television series developed for Baiskoafu by Ravee Farooq, based on the 2012 novel Ehenas Hama Loabiveyey by Ahmed Iqbal. Produced by Ahmed Iqbal under IQ Productions, the series stars Mohamed Vishal, Aishath Rishmy, Ahmed Maseeh, Fathimath Sara Adam, Mohamed Yunaan and Sheela Najeeb in pivotal roles. The film follows the experiences of a long-term domestic and sexually abused male victim and how he faces the societal obstacles of marriage.

== Cast and characters ==
=== Main ===
- Mohamed Vishal as Ahmed Niyaz (Season 1–2)
- Aishath Rishmy as Shaira (Season 1–2)
- Ahmed Maseeh as Rayan (Season 1)
- Fathimath Sara Adam as Shazu (Season 1–2)
- Aminath Shamana as Neena (Season 1–2)
- Ahmed Sharif as Shinaz (Season 1–2)
- Aminath Silna as Leeza (Season 1–2)
- Mariyam Waheedha as Zidhu (Season 1–2)
- Ali Nadheeh as Farey (Season 1–2)
- Mohamed Yunaan as Hamdhan (Season 1–2)
- Sheela Najeeb as Shakeela (Season 1–2)
- Mohamed Manik as Ibrahim Zahir (Season 1–2)
- Abdulla Azman as Farish (Season 2)
- Aminath Shuha as Zoya (Season 2)
- Washiya Mohamed as Pink (Season 2)
- Nathasha Jaleel as Farzana (Season 2)
- Mariyam Azza (Season 2)

=== Guest ===
- Mariyam Haleem as Sobira (Season 1–2)
- Ali Shazleem as Majid Saleem (Season 1–2)
- Mohamed Yamin Ali as Shamin (Season

1)

- Adam Saeed as a Bully (Season 1, Episode 1)
- Fathimath Rihla as Rihu (Season 1)
- Ali Usam as Nafiz (Season 1–2)
- Aminath Rasheedha as Shaira's mother (Season 2)
- Mohamed Shaif as Hamza; Leeza's boyfriend (Season 1–2)
- Shaushan Mohamed as Ina (Season 1)
- Hawwa Neesha as Shiru (Season 1)
- Niuma Mohamed as Rayan's aunt (Voice-over) (Season 1; 3 episodes)
- Ahmed Saeed as Rayan's counselor (Voice-over) (Season 1; 2 episodes)
- Mira Mohamed Majid as a wedding performer (Season 1)
- Ali Farooq as Clergyman (Season 1)
- Ismail Jumaih as Fayaz (Voice-over) (Season 1)
- Abdulla Wimfaz as a cab driver and Rayan's Bodube (Voice-over) (Season 1)
- Ismail Naseer as Shaaira's father (Season 2)
- Nuzuhath Shuaib as an office colleague (Season 2)
- Ali Azim as an office colleague (Season 2)
- Aminath Rishfa as Zeba Muhusin (Season 2)
- Ravee Farooq as Sohail; Niyaz's interviewer (Season 2)
- Musthafa Hakeem as Sohail's secretary (Season 2)
- Ahmed Azmeel as a doctor (Season 2)
- Meyna Hassan as Judge (Season 2)
- Hamdhan Farooq as Lawyer (Season 2)
- Yune Mohamed Yunaan as Neen's daughter (Season 2)

== Episodes ==
=== Season 1 ===
No. overall	No. in season	Title	Directed by	Original release date
1	1	"Square One"	Ravee Farooq	July 16, 2019
Ahmed Niyaz (Mohamed Vishal) who is sidelined by his siblings and bullied since childhood for being regarded as effeminate and unmanly, secures a job at an office, where he meets Shazu (Fathimath Sara Adam), a bubbly and friendly young woman. Later that night, it was revealed that Niyaz is being sexually abused by someone.
2	2	"Acceptance"	Ravee Farooq	July 23, 2019
Rayan (Ahmed Maseeh) who was sexually abused by his father during his childhood, confides in a friend. Niyaz slowly involves in office gatherings and celebrations while his colleague Hamdhan (Mohamed Yunaan) constantly harasses him. Niyaz grows closer to Shazu.
3	3	"Disguise"	Ravee Farooq	July 30, 2019
A conversation with Neena (Aminath Shamana) made Shazu realizes the great in Niyaz's personality. Shazu's complicated relationship with Nafiz (Ali Usam) is highlighted. Niyaz becomes slowly attracted to Neena. Rayan's life becomes a misery due to constant bullying and speculations.
4	4	"Reality Check"	Ravee Farooq	August 6, 2019
Humiliated in front of his friends, Niyaz's brother, Shinaz (Ahmed Sharif) flew into an abusive rage once he reaches home. Niyaz confesses his feelings towards Neena which disturbs Shazu.
5	5	"Adaptation"	Ravee Farooq	August 13, 2019
Niyaz undergoes a fashion makeover to propose Neena on her birthday but his plans backfires when she ultimately announces her marriage plans with her ex-boyfriend, Shamin (Mohamed Yamin Ali) and humiliates Niyaz.
6	6	"Back to Square One"	Ravee Farooq	August 24, 2019
Niyaz returns from a two-week leave. Back at office, he keeps avoiding Shazu while she tries her best to defend him against all bullies and to regain his trust. Much to her surprise, Shazu notices a condom at Niyaz's room and finds some of his earlier statements incoherent.
7	7	"Exposure"	Ravee Farooq	September 2, 2019
Niyaz builds self-confidence and lashes out in anger to Hamdhan while defending Shazu. She confronts him regarding her suspicions which he denies.
8	8	"Assurance"	Ravee Farooq	September 8, 2019
Shazu agrees to select paintings from Niyaz's collection to display in an exhibition, as a return he accedes to her request to join an office trip. Niyaz befriends with Hamdhan while Neena and Niyaz sort their differences out. Nafiz returns from abroad.
9	9	"Commitment"	Ravee Farooq	September 14, 2019
Rayan consults a counselor regarding his life circumstances. Nafiz and Shazu discuss their future plans, while she shows reluctance towards her choices. With the help of Hamdhan, Niyaz makes new experiences.
10	10	"Identity"	Ravee Farooq	September 24, 2019
Fayaz cuts all his ties with Rayan which resulted in him taking a drastic step. Niyaz and Shazu had an intimate moment. She feels guilty about it and came to Nafiz asking for forgiveness but instead caught him having an affair with another woman. Later that night, Niyaz's mother, Shakeela (Sheela Najeeb) figures out a secret family revelation. Three weeks later, Shazu meets Niyaz at a furniture shop and is introduced to his wife Shaira (Aishath Rishmy) who is eight years older than him.

=== Season 2 ===
No. overall	No. in season	Title	Directed by	Original release date
11	1	"Status"	Ravee Farooq	June 18, 2020
12	2	"U-Turn"	Ravee Farooq	June 24, 2020
13	3	"Alteration"	Ravee Farooq	July 2, 2020
14	4	"Motive"	Ravee Farooq	July 9, 2020
15	5	"Label"	Ravee Farooq	July 23, 2020
16	6	"Consent"	Ravee Farooq	July 30, 2020
17	7	"Survivors"	Ravee Farooq	August 5, 2019
18	8	"Confrontation"	Ravee Farooq	August 12, 2020
19	9	"Eruption"	Ravee Farooq	August 26, 2020
20	10	"Aftermath"	Ravee Farooq	September 3, 2020
21	11	"Karma"	Ravee Farooq	September 9, 2020
22	12	"Closure"	Ravee Farooq	September 25, 2020

== Development ==
=== Story ===
Ahmed Iqbal initiated penning the first draft of Ehenas Hama Loabiveyey in 2009 when he was posting stories on blogs. In need of trying a different genre than his previous fictions, Iqbal focused the novel on major three themes; sexual abuse to men, domestic violence and bullying. In an interview Iqbal said; "I initially struggled to develop the story considering the fact that its themes are labelled to be disgusting in the Maldivian culture". After posting three to four episodes of his narration, Iqbal received positive comments from readers and decided to build the story further.

=== Production ===
On 11 March 2016, it was announced that a new production studio, Me studio, has acquired the rights to develop a film based on Ahmed Iqbal's 2012 novel, Ehenas Hama Loabiveyey. The production team expressed their interest to produce the film due to the "lukewarm response" the novel has received despite its "fragile issue" the original story touches upon. They projected to start filming in May 2016 and release the film before the year ends. However, on 30 January 2019, it was reported that the producers later changed the project to be developed as a web series rather than a feature film, citing the idea of expanding the story and hence "incidence can be fully elaborated and justified" in a series without being "trimmed" for a film. A casting call was opened for interested actors on the same day by actress Aishath Rishmy. Workshops were held for those actors who were selected to star in the film from the audition. Director, Ravee Farooq revealed that majority of the actors are newcomers though the film will feature established actors like Sheela Najeeb and Mohamed Manik. Filming for the series began on 15 February 2019.

== Soundtrack ==
Track listing
No.	Title	Lyrics	Music	Singer(s)	Length
1.	"Insaana"	Esa	Esa, Abdulla Nafil	Esa
2.	"Ehenas"	Hussain Shifan	Fathhulla Shakeel Hussain	Hussain Shifan, Aishath Shamahath
3.	"Vujood"	Esa	Esa, Abdulla Nafil	Esa
4.	"Dho Khiyaalee"	Mezzo Mohamed Majid		Mira Mohamed Majid
5.	"Loabi Vaathee Ey ft Ehenas"	Moosa Samau, Hussain Shifan	Aduvi	Moosa Samau, Mira Mohamed Majid
6.	"Mirey"	Ahmed Iqbal	Yoosuf Shimaz	Aminath Saina Rasheed
7.	"Geri Loabi"	Ishaante	Ishaante, Ibbe	Anya, Muad
8.	"Fus Gandeh"	Ishaante	Ishaante, Faya	Zara, Shiuz
9.	"Kaamiyaabu"	Achecia	Achecia	Hussain Infithaah
10.	"Ufaa"	Appi	Appi	Appi
11.	"Kastholhu"	Mohamed Abdul Ghanee	Ibrahim Shiham	Ravee Farooq

== Release ==
The teaser trailer of the series was released on 24 March 2019. The official trailer came out on YouTube on 20 April 2019. The first episode of the show was streamed on 16 July 2019.

== Response ==
The series opened to mainly positive reviews from critics. Aishath Maahaa reviewing from Dho? praised the realistic portrayal of mother-son relationship and acting performance of the newcomers; "At the helm of Ravee's brilliance, aided by stellar debut performances, Ehenas is an excellent product in overall". Ifraz Ali from Dho? ranked the series in the third position of the year's best projects while particularly praising the first season for its suspense and the whole project for carefully maintaining a standard similar to the Hollywood television releases. However, with inclusion of characters beyond its book, the second series was found to be "a little problematic" for him with repeated dialogues and lagged character developments.
