= Faree =

2021 Maldivian film

- Official film poster
- Directed by: Ahmed Hisham Saeed
- Written by: Ahmed Hisham Saeed
- Screenplay by: Ahmed Hisham Saeed
- Produced by: Arif Abdullah
- Starring: Nuzuhath Shuaib; Ravee Farooq
- Cinematography: Ahmed Shamin Nizam
- Edited by: Ismail Epic
- Music by: Abdulla Alfaf Shakir
- Production company: Madhoship
- Distributed by: Baiskoafu
- Release date: 29 March 2021
- Running time: 97 minutes
- Country: Maldives
- Language: Dhivehi
- Budget: MVR 400,000

Faree is a 2021 Maldivian film written and directed by Ahmed Hisham Saeed. The film stars Nuzuhath Shuaib and Ravee Farooq in lead roles. The film follows a single mother through her decision to leave a deteriorating marriage as she confronts the dysfunctional life she left behind. The film had a digital premiere on 29 March 2021.

== Premise ==
Concerned with Umar's (Yaafi Mohamed Hameed) behavioral change, the school management meets with his mother, Faree (Nuzuhath Shuaib) who is trying to relieve herself and her son from an abusive marriage with a drug addict, Faidh (Ravee Farooq). Meanwhile, Faree's younger sister, Aisthu (Aishath Thasmeena) begins a romantic relationship with a married man which further disturbs their mother (Fauziyya Hassan). She advises Faree to get back with Faidh and sort their differences out, though Faree has a difference of opinion. Although influenced by his friend, Suhail (Mohamed Yunaan), Faidh desperately tries to restore his relationship with Faree and their son.

== Cast ==
- Nuzuhath Shuaib as Faree
- Ravee Farooq as Faidh
- Yaafi Mohamed Hameed as Umar
- Fauziyya Hassan as Rashidha
- Ahmed Easa as Sappe
- Mohamed Yunaan as Suhail
- Aishath Thasmeena as Aisthu
- Abdulla Rasheed Moosa as Farooq
- Ahmed Shan as Soba
- Sheerin Ali as Suhails' girlfriend
- Mariyam Afaaf Adam as Secretary
- Mohamed Maaiz Sobah as College Receptionist
- Ibrahim Hamdhan Abdullah as Clinic Receptionist
- Ahmed Shamoon Zahir as Lecturer
- Mohamed Rifshan as Thug 1
- Saamee Hussain Didi as Thug 2

== Development ==
Following the success of Vishka (2017), Madhoship Studio initiated in developing a feature film titled Bagalhey which got delayed indefinitely due to the high production cost. Hence, the crew moved to their next project titled Faree, which is part of the anthology being produced by the studio and narrating the life of a single mother. In June 2018, a casting call was opened for interested actors where acting workshops were conducted for the shortlisted actors before finalizing the cast. Filming commenced on 15 July 2018 and continued for almost a month. According to the director of the film Ahmed Hisham Saeed, in order to present the film in the most realistic pacing, the film will not have any songs in it.

== Soundtrack ==
Track listing
No.	Title	Singer(s)	Length
1.	"Cafe' Theme"	Barchie
2.	"Heynaaraa"	Abdulla Alfaf Shakir

== Release ==
The film was scheduled for theatrical release on 2 April 2020, but was postponed due to the COVID-19 pandemic. Later, citing the closure of cinema, the team announced that the film will have a digital premiere where it will be made available for streaming through Baiskoafu application from 29 March 2021.
