= Kudarikilu =

Inhabited island in Maldives

Kudarikilu ކުޑަރިކިލު
- Inhabited island
- Location in Maldives
- Coordinates: 05°18′07″N 73°04′15″E
- Country: Maldives
- Administrative atoll: Baa Atoll
- Distance to Malé: 133.73 km (83.10 mi)

Area
  - Total: 0.137 km^{2} (0.053 sq mi)

Dimensions
  - Length: 0.520 km (0.323 mi)
  - Width: 0.370 km (0.230 mi)

Population (2022)
  - Total: 557
  - Density: 4,070/km^{2} (10,500/sq mi)
- Time zone: UTC+05:00 (MST)

Kudarikilu (Dhivehi: ކުޑަރިކިލު) is one of the inhabited islands of Southern Maalhosmadulhu Atoll (Baa Atoll).

== Geography ==
The island is 133.73 km (83 mi; 72 nmi) north of the country's capital, Malé.

=== Middle Maalhosmadulhu ===
The northern part of administrative South Maalhosmadulhu forms a clearly delimited, roughly triangular, natural atoll called Middle Maalhosmadulhu or 'Fasdūtherē' (meaning 'between five islands'), with a total area of 135 km^{2} (52 sq mi). On its southwest corner stands Kudarikilu Island, the only inhabited one of the Middle Maalhosmadulhu Atoll, with an area of 13.7 hectares (34 acres). In addition, there are 10 smaller, uninhabited islets on the rim of the atoll. The total land area is about 30 hectares (74 acres). The lagoon becomes narrower towards the west and its average depth is 19 fathoms (35 m). The Atoll is separated from North Maalhosmadulhu by a deep channel (Moresby Channel in the Admiralty chart) and from the southern part of South Maalhosmadulhu by a narrower channel running from east to west.

== Demography ==
Historical population
Year	Pop.	±%
2006	355	—
2014	410	+15.5%
2022	557	+35.9%
2006–2022: Census populations Source:
