= Hussain Sobah =

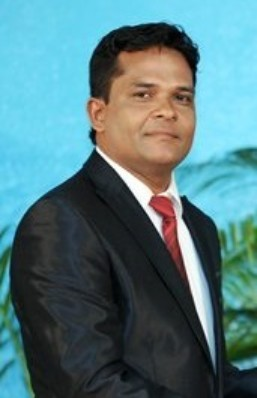
- Sobah receiving the National Award of Recognition, 2013
- Born: 11 November 1972 (age 53); Dh. Hulhudheli, Maldives
- Occupations: Actor, music composer, playback singer
- Years active: 1995–present
- Children: 4

Hussain Sobah (born 11 November 1972) is a Maldivian film actor, music composer and playback singer.

== Career ==
In 1995, Sobah featured in Mohamed Shiyaz's Dhushman alongside Mariyam Nisha, Aminath Rasheedha and Hamid Ali in pivotal roles. In the film, he plays the character Riyaz, an underprivileged young man who loses his girlfriend over social discrimination.

Hamid Ali's Badhal was released in 1996, in which he starred alongside Ali, Niuma Mohamed and Waleedha Waleed as a twin; a mentally challenged young man with an immature attitude. Sobah also appeared opposite Aishat Shirani in a Television Maldives production, Fun Asaru (1996) which follows two women; one searching for her mother and one fighting cancer. The following year, Sobah appeared alongside Mariyam Nisha and Jamsheedha Ahmed as a middle-class talented vocalist in Amjad Ibrahim's Loabeega Aniyaa.

In 1998, Sobah starred opposite Mariyam Nisha and Jamsheedha Ahmed in Fathimath Nahula's debut direction Fahuneyvaa, which portrays the love-conflict of a man between a prominent stage performer and a deaf-mute poor girl. Sobah played the role of Ziyan Ali, a stage performer who marries a deaf-mute girl despite his family's disapproval. His performance and the film received critical appreciation from critics and was a commercial success.

The following year, he played the husband of the latter and a servant-turned-musician. This was followed by the Ali Musthafa-directed Umurah (1999) opposite Jamsheedha Ahmed and Reeko Moosa Manik. He next collaborated with Amjad Ibrahim for his comedy drama film Qurbaani (1999) starring opposite Mariyam Nisha and Yoosuf Shafeeu. The film was a financially successful project.

Sobah again collaborated with Amjad Ibrahim and Mariyam Nisha for the horror film Baaraige Fas (2009) where he produced and composed music for the song apart from starring as a news reporter. The film follows a temptress vampire who goes on a killing spree to quench her thirst. The film received mainly negative reviews from critics.

After a break of five years, Sobah appeared onscreen for the family drama film, Aadheys (2014) directed by Abdul Faththaah and starring Niuma Mohamed, Amira Ismail, Moosa Zakariyya, Fathimath Azifa and Ali Azim in pivotal roles. Filming was completed in 2011, though it was released three years later following the death of film producer Hassain Ali. It revolves around a sacrificing mother and her affection towards her child. Upon release, the film received mixed reviews from critics and failed to leave an impression commercially. Ismail Naail reviewing for Vaguthu wrote: "For a comeback, Sobah should have chosen another project. His performance is "bitter" and "unnatural". From the dialogue delivery to "over-expressive" hand movements, Sobah's acting is below-average at best".

== Filmography ==
=== As an actor ===
Year	Title	Role	Notes	Ref(s)
1995	Dhushman	Riyaz		
1996	Fun Asaru	Sobah		
1996	Badhal	Hussain / Hassan	Double role	
1997	Loabeega Aniyaa	Ahammaidhee / Soba		
1998	Ethoofaaneerey	Fayaz / Latheef	Double role	
1998	Fahuneyvaa	Ziyan Ali		
1999	Loabiveriyaa			
1999	Umurah	Niman		
1999	Qurbaani	Hussain Sobah		
2001	Hiyy Heyokuraathi			
2009	Baaraige Fas	Ziyad	Also the producer and music composer	
2014	Aadheys	Ahmed		
2025	Sorry	Fiyaz		

=== Television ===
Year	Title	Role	Notes	Ref(s)
1996	Badhunaam			
1997	Ummeedhu			
1998	Ehan'dhaan			
2004	Thiyey Mihithuge Vindhakee	Dr. Muneer	Recurring role; 4 episodes Also the music composer and playback singer	

== Discography ==
=== As a Singer ===
Feature Film
Year	Film	Song	Lyricist(s)	Co-Artist(s)
N/A	Gilan	"Gilan" (Theme Song)		Rafiyath Rameeza
1996	Badhal	"Ekanivaneeye Adhi Fenifa Rovey"		Shifa Thaufeeq
1996	Badhal	"Adhi Heelaa Adhi Dheyshey Kiyaa"		Shifa Thaufeeq
1999	Nuruhunvi Loabi	"Moonaa Ey Fari Moonaa"		Solo
2009	Baaraige Fas	"Hiyy Edhey Moonakee"		Fathimath Zoona
2017	Bos	"Loabin Gos Bosdheyn"	Mausoom Shakir	Mohamed Abdul Ghanee
2018	Reyvumun	"Himafodhu Mi Vaarey"		Fathimath Zoona

Short Film
Year	Film	Song	Lyricist(s)	Co-Artist(s)
2004	Dheke Dhekeves 1	"Enme Ran'galhu"	Ahmed Nashidh (Dharavandhoo)	Solo
2004	Dheke Dhekeves 1	"Dhonkamanaa Aharennaa In'dhefaananhey"	Ahmed Nashidh (Dharavandhoo)	Shaheedha Mohamed
2004	Keymaatu	"Magey Sanpaa Dhimaaveemaa"		Solo
2005	Dheke Dhekeves 2	"Kadaboh Kadaboh"		Solo
2005	Falhi Sikunthu 2	"Hithuge Mainaa"	Adam Naseer Ibrahim	Sofoora Khaleel
2006	Dheke Dhekeves 4	"Farubadha Kan'daashe Midhanee"	Kopee Mohamed Rasheedh	Hussain Ali
2006	Dheke Dhekeves 4	"Hiyy Thelheyvaru Meygaa"	Kopee Mohamed Rasheedh	Solo
2012	Dheke Dhekeves 6	"Alhe Keevvegenhey Bunebalaa"		Shaheedha Mohamed
2012	Dheke Dhekeves 6	"Hiyy Thelheyhey"	Adam Haleem Adnan	Rafiyath Rameeza

Television
Year	Title	Song	Lyricist(s)	Co-Artist(s)
1997	Ummeedhu	"Leveythee Mineyvaa"	Hussain Sobah	Shifa Thaufeeq
2003	Edhuvas En'buri Annaanenama	"Hiyy Magey Kiyaadhemey"	Adam Haleem Adnan	Fathimath Zoona
2003	Edhuvas En'buri Annaanenama	"Edhuvas En'buri Annaanenama"	Adam Haleem Adnan	Shaheedha Mohamed
2003-2004	Thiyey Mihithuge Vindhakee	"Thiyey Mihithuge Vindhakee"		Lahufa Faiz
2004-2005	Loabi Nulibunas	"Loabi Dhen Gaimu Vevijjey"		Aishath Inaya

Non-Film Songs
Year	Film	Song	Lyricist(s)	Co-Artist(s)
1996	Goanaa	"Loabin Mi Vaavaru"	Hussain Sobah	Shifa Thaufeeq
1996	Goanaa	"Leveythee Mineyvaa"	Hussain Sobah	Shifa Thaufeeq
1996	Goanaa	"Moonaa Ey Fari Moonaa"	Hussain Sobah	Shifa Thaufeeq
1996	Goanaa	"Neyngeyey Nan Ivenee"		Shifa Thaufeeq
1999	Kasthoori	"Dheewaanaa"		Shifa Thaufeeq
2000	Hinithun	"Thedhekey Thedhekey"	Mausoom Shakir	Solo
2000	Hinithun	"Dhookohfa Nudhaanan"	Hussain Rasheedh	Fathimath Zeenath
2000	Hissaa	"Yaaraa Magey"		Fathimath Zeenath
2001	Baaodi	"Dhaanamey Dhaanamey"		Fathimath Rauf
2001	Dhunthari	"Heeladheyshey Naazunee"	Ahmed Nashidh (Dharavandhoo)	Solo
2001	Dhunthari	"Nunidheyney Hama"	Ahmed Nashidh (Dharavandhoo)	Fathimath Zoona
2001	Dhunthari	"Thee Loabi Hithekey"	Ahmed Nashidh (Dharavandhoo)	Shifa Thaufeeq
2001	Dhunthari	"Kan'bulo Thiya Gothuga"	Ahmed Nashidh (Dharavandhoo)	Shaheedha Mohamed
2001	Randhi	"Tharuheebu Dheyshey"		Solo
2002	E Kamanaa	"Dhurunuvaashey Jaanaa"	Hussain Sobah	Solo
2002	Naash	"Enme Ran'galhu"	Ahmed Nashidh (Dharavandhoo)	Solo
2002	Thun'di	"Dhonkaloage Aiminaa"		Solo
2003	Billoori	"Hiyy Magey Kiyaadhemey"	Adam Haleem Adnan	Fathimath Zoona
2003	Himeyn Dhanvaru	"Meygaa Erey Firumaalaa"	Hussain Sobah	Shifa Thaufeeq
2003	Himeyn Dhanvaru	"Kamanaa Rulhin"	Ahmed Nashidh (Dharavandhoo)	Solo
2004	Fenmeeru	"Ulhe Ulhe Nidhi Lolakah Naey"	Ahmed Nashidh (Dharavandhoo)	Fathimath Zoona
2004	Maamuige Reythah	"Magey Magey Magey"	Abdul Hameed	Shaheedha Mohamed
2004	Thibaa	"Ey Bunebalaashey"		Shaheedha Mohamed
2005	Aan Dhogey	"Magey Sanpaa Dhimaaveemaa"		Solo
2005	Dhilaasaa	"Hithugaa Khiyaalu Aaveyey"		Shaheedha Mohamed
2005	Ulhe Ulhefa	"Mi Jaliyaa Dhanee Dhanee"	Adam Naseer Ibrahim	Solo
2005	Yaa' Habeys	"Kadaboh Kadaboh"		Solo
2005	Yaa' Habeys	"Hithuge Mainaa"	Adam Naseer Ibrahim	Sofoora Khaleel
2006	Bichaanaa	"Haadha Fikurugaa"	Ahmed Nashidh (Dharavandhoo)	Imaadh Ismail
2006	Dhenves...	"Veeloabin Kohdheefi Ufaa"	Hussain Sobah	Moonisa Khaleel
2006	Hiyy Dheewaanaa 3	"Kiyaadheynamey Hiyy Edheyhaa"	Shareefa Fakhry	Sofoora Khaleel
2006	Oh' Salhi	"Farubadha Kan'daashe Midhanee"	Kopee Mohamed Rasheedh	Hussain Ali
2006	Oh' Salhi	"Hiyy Thelheyvaru Meygaa"	Kopee Mohamed Rasheedh	Solo
2006	Vakivi Hin'dhu	"Vaudhey Kuri Ahudhaa"	Ahmed Nashidh (Dharavandhoo)	Ismail Huzam
2007	Hiyy Beynumey	"Loaiybakee"	Ahmed Falah	Aishath Inaya, Ahmed Falah
2007	Salaamey...	"Kihineh Veethoa"	Ahmed Nashidh (Dharavandhoo)	Fathimath Zoona
2007	Salaamey...	"Koathaafathugaa Vaathi Nishaan"		Mariyam Rifqa
2008	Hiyy Dheewaanaa 4	"Nazaru Dhinee"	Shareefa Fakhry	Moonisa Khaleel
2008	Hiyy Dhemey Loabin	"Thiee Thiee Ey Edhey Loaiybakee"		Moonisa Khaleel, Mohamed Farhad
2008	Hiyy Sihenee	"Kalaa Fenumun"		Solo
2008	Kalaa Haadha Loaiybey	"Aimey Aimey"	Adam Naseer Ibrahim	Shaheedha Mohamed
2008	Maumoon 2008	"Qaumee Maslahathah"		Rafiyath Rameeza, Fathimath Zoona
2008	Maumoon 2008	"Mi Maumoon Hovan Hovan"		Rafiyath Rameeza, Fathimath Zoona, Mohamed Farhad, Shaheedha Riffath
2008	Maumoon 2008	"Thiyaee Zaeemey"		Shaheedha Mohamed
2009	Loabi Vaathee	"Furusathu Dheynan Hunnaashey"	Easa Shareef	Shaheedha Mohamed
2011	Leveythee Mineyvaa	"Gaathah Aissaa"		Lahufa Faiz
2011	Leveythee Mineyvaa	"Heekuree Miee Dhushmanehhey"		Aishath Afaaf, Mohamed Farhad
2011	Leveythee Mineyvaa	"Thee Magey Jaan Edhey Piyaaraa Ey"		Fathimath Zoona
2011	Leveythee Mineyvaa	"Leveythee Mineyvaa" (Remix Version)	Hussain Sobah	Solo
2011	Leveythee Mineyvaa	"Dhanvandhen"		Shaheedha Mohamed
2011	Tharinge Rey 2011	"Dhaiy Alhaalaafa"		Hawwa Thaufeeq
2013	Hiyy Dheebalaa 3	"Kihineh Veethoa"	Ahmed Nashidh (Dharavandhoo)	Fathimath Zoona
2014	Shuja 2014	"Nikan Vote Dhemaa Suja Hovan"		Solo
2014	Shuja 2014	"Sujaa Ah Vaaney Dhoa Support Dheyn"		Solo
2014	Shuja 2014	"Sujaa Ey Hovaanee"		Rafiyath Rameeza
2017	Ran Han'dhaanugai: S02	"Beywafaa Vee Kalaaey"		Rishma
2019	Shuja 2019	"Ekuveri Sujaaey"		Shaheedha Mohamed
2020	Single	"Varah Loabivey"		Nashidha Ahmed
2020	Eid Show 1441	"Hiyy Kiyanee"		Nashidha Ahmed
2020	Eid Show 1441	"Sazaa"	Hussain Sobah	Sofa Thaufeeq

=== Selected discography as a composer ===
- Ainbehge Loabi Firiehge Vaajib (2000)
- Hiiy Edhenee (2001)
- Ginihila (2003)
- Kalaayaanulaa (2003)
- Vehey Vaarey Therein (2003)
- Dheke Dhekeves 2 (2005)
- Dheke Dhekeves 3 (2006)
- Dheke Dhekeves 4 (2006)
- Hukuru Vileyrey (2006)
- Udhabaani (2009)
- Hiyy Rohvaanulaa (2009)
- Dhin Veynuge Hithaamaigaa (2010)
- Heyonuvaane (2010)
- Hithey Dheymee (2011)
- Vee Beyvafa (2016)
- Nivairoalhi (2019)

== Accolades ==
Year	Award	Category	Nominated work	Result	Ref(s)
1998	Aafathis Awards - 1998	Best Actor	Ethoofaaneerey	Won	
2013	National Award of Recognition	Performing Arts - Music composition		Won	
2015	6th Gaumee Film Awards	Best Original Song	"Hiyy Rohvaanulaa" - Hiyy Rohvaanulaa	Nominated	
