= Naaummeedhu =

2001 Maldivian romantic film by Fathimath Nahul

- Official film poster
- Directed by: Fathimath Nahula
- Written by: Fathimath Nahula
- Screenplay by: Fathimath Nahula
- Starring: Reeko Moosa Manik; Yoosuf Shafeeu; Mariyam Nisha; Jamsheedha Ahmed
- Cinematography: Mohamed Rasheed
- Edited by: Sadha Ahmed
- Production company: Mapa
- Release date: 2001
- Running time: 192 minutes
- Country: Maldives
- Language: Dhivehi

Naaummeedhu (English translation: Hopeless) is a 2001 Maldivian romantic film written and directed by Fathimath Nahula. Produced under Mapa, the film stars Reeko Moosa Manik, Yoosuf Shafeeu, Mariyam Nisha and Jamsheedha Ahmed in pivotal roles.

== Plot ==
Ahmed Shifan confesses his love for his childhood friend, Zeyna, who politely declines him as she is already engaged. Heartbroken, Shifan leaves the country to focus on his studies abroad. Eight years later, Zeyna is happily married to Ayaz and they are blessed with an adorable daughter, Enash, whom she named honoring Shifan's request to name her first daughter the same when he proposed to her. Meanwhile, Shifan who is now a medical school graduate is still disheartened by the rejection and has remained single despite his father's attempts to set him up with other women. Eventually, he decides to give an honest attempt at trying to move on and agrees to date his father's friend's daughter Nathasha who has fancied him for a while.

Zeyna runs into an old classmate, Noora and the two reconnect. Noora reveals to Zeyna that she is homeless as she had been kicked by her cruel, gold digging stepmother who wanted Noora out of the picture to seize her father's property. Out of pity, Zeyna invites Noora to stay at her place until she gets back on her feet. However, the cunning Noora intended to marry a "wealthy Male' man" to spite her stepmother and had been eyeing Ayaz all along; which was what prompted her to reconnect with Zeyna in the first place. Noora attempts to seduce Ayaz on multiple occasions and he finally gives in during a time Enash and Zeyna are out of town.

After seducing him, Noora coerces Ayaz to marry her by feigning pregnancy. Ayaz panics and reluctantly agrees on the condition that she accepts Enash as her own daughter, to which Noora agrees. However, Noora has a condition of her own that Ayaz must divorce Zeyna in order to marry her. Zeyna eventually finds out that Ayaz has been cheating on her with Noora and confronts her, only to be taunted. Not wanting Ayaz to oust her out of his life, Zeyna attempts to resolve things amicably, going as far to suggest polygamy. Much to her surprise, Ayaz is completely indifferent to Zeyna's feelings and suggests that they get a divorce, instead of apologizing to her. Zeyna despite objecting at first eventually agrees in order to keep him happy. Heartbroken, Zeyna begs Ayaz to let Enash stay with her as she has no family left. As Enash herself wishes to stay with her mother, Ayaz agrees. Zeyna and Enash leave Ayaz's apartment in Male' to go back to her native island.

However, this arrangement doesn't last as Ayaz starts missing Enash. Noora suggests bringing Enash back to Male' even if it meant taking her from Zeyna by force; as she becomes sick of hearing Ayaz vent about missing Enash. The two take a trip to Zeyna's island without any prior notice, where Ayaz snatches and drags a crying Enash away from Zeyna.

Things abruptly change for Ayaz and Noora after marriage. Noora claims that she had a miscarriage, has a short temper, and is disrespectful towards Enash. She is also controlling towards Ayaz, but frequently goes out with other men, despite Ayaz's objections. In an attempt to make things better, Ayaz takes both Noora and Enash to Guraidhoo, Noora's native island. While walking around, Enash sees Zeyna, catatonic and having lost her memory due to the shock of losing her daughter, in the yard of a psychiatric facility. Enash attempts to make conversation with her through the fence, but Zeyna cannot speak and just blankly stares at her.

Noora catches Enash with Zeyna and forcefully tries to take the child away before she could call her father. After seeing Noora take Enash away similarly to how Ayaz had taken her, Zeyna regains her memory and calls out for her child, but soon faints on the spot. Enash tries to tell her father that she had seen her mother in the facility, but gets dismissed by Noora who calls her a liar. As the mood of the trip had soured, the trio return to Male'. Ayaz gets curious and phones the facility to find out whether a person by his ex-wife's name was admitted and realizes that Enash had been telling the truth all along. However, he decides not to do anything about it.

Shifan, now a clinical psychiatrist volunteers for the same facility part-time and is shocked to find Zeyna there as a patient. He decides to treat her privately and takes her back to Male' with him as her guardian. At this point, Shifan has also broken up with Nathasha after realizing that his feelings for Zeyna were still too strong to make room for anyone else.

Zeyna and Shifan become close once again as she opens up. She details the events that had gone down and breaks down crying upon mentioning her daughter. Touched, Shifan vows to help her get the custody of Enash. Soon after, Shifan visits Ayaz and gives him a brief update on Zeyna and requests him to send Enash to Zeyna for a few hours as they had not seen each other in months, to which he surprisingly agrees. Shifan also informs Ayaz that Zeyna intends to take the custody matter to court. Enash starts visiting Zeyna at Shifan's house on a semi-regular basis and warms up to him. Zeyna and Shifan's friendship slowly blossoms into love and they start sharing romantic moments with each other.

One day, Ayaz walks into Noora hitting Enash and learns how abusive she has been towards Enash throughout their marriage. He angrily divorces her and kicks her out, forcing Noora to take a boat back to Guraidhoo as her stepmother would not take her in either. Later on, Enash realizes how lonely her father is and asks him to get back together with Zeyna. Ayaz decides to talk to Zeyna and ask her if they could still work things out for the sake of their daughter. However, Zeyna has now fallen in love with Shifan and no longer has space in her heart for him. Nevertheless, she agrees to stay civil with Ayaz for Enash's sake.

Dejected and having processed everything, Ayaz drops Enash off at Shifan's place one last time. He announces that he has given full custody of Enash to Zeyna and tells her that going to the court is unnecessary, to which Shifan replies that a child requires both parents' love to grow up mentally healthy. Touched, Ayaz wishes Shifan and Zeyna a happy life and walks out, having acknowledged his mistake of taking a faithful partner that truly loved him, for granted.

== Cast ==
- Reeko Moosa Manik as Ayaz
- Yoosuf Shafeeu as Dr. Ahmed Shifan
- Mariyam Nisha as Zeyna
- Jamsheedha Ahmed as Noora
- Mariyam Enash Sinan as Enash
- Koyya Hassan Manik as Mahir
- Mariyam Nazima as Nathasha
- Mariyam Haleem as Noora's step-mother
- Ibrahim Rasheed (special appearance)
- Waleedha Waleed as Haseena (special appearance)

== Soundtrack ==
Track listing
No.	Title	Lyrics	Singer(s)	Length
1.	"Oagaavee Hithakun"	Boi Ahmed Khaleel	Umar Zahir, Fathimath Rauf	4:39
2.	"Kalaa Ah Mihiyy"	Mausoom Shakir	Ali Rameez, Fathimath Zoona	4:57
3.	"Aslu Mithuraa"	Boi Ahmed Khaleel	Ali Rameez, Fazeela Amir	5:27
4.	"Adhu Mivee Keehhe?"	Mausoom Shakir	Ali Rameez	5:47
5.	"Naaummeedh"	Mausoom Shakir	Abdul Baaree	6:17
6.	"Bappa Aeema Aharen Vaa Ufaa"	Mausoom Shakir	Abdul Baaree, Ahmed Nabeel Mohamed	6:18
