= Heyonuvaane =

- Official film poster
- Directed by: Yoosuf Shafeeu
- Written by: Fathimath Nahula
- Screenplay by: Fathimath Nahula
- Produced by: Fathimath Nahula
- Starring: Yoosuf Shafeeu; Fathimath Fareela; Sheela Najeeb
- Cinematography: Ibrahim Moosa
- Edited by: Yoosuf Shafeeu
- Music by: Hussain Sobah
- Production company: Crystal Entertainment
- Release date: December 28, 2010
- Country: Maldives
- Language: Dhivehi

Heyonuvaane (transl. Please) is a 2010 drama film directed by Yoosuf Shafeeu. Written and produced by Fathimath Nahula under Crystal Entertainment, the film stars Yoosuf Shafeeu, Fathimath Fareela and Sheela Najeeb in pivotal roles. The film was released on 28 December 2010.

== Cast ==
- Yoosuf Shafeeu as Ziya
- Fathimath Fareela as Rizna Zareer
- Sheela Najeeb as Muna
- Maani as Maani
- Lufshan Shakeeb as Nasheed
- Mohamed Faisal as Dr. Latheef
- Koyya Hassan Manik as Hamid
- Fauziyya Hassan as Muna's mother
- Aminath Rasheedha as Ziyad's mother

== Soundtrack ==
Track listing
No.	Title	Lyrics	Music	Singer(s)	Length
1.	"Hiyy Adhu Ronee Ey"	Hussain Shihab	Moosa Samau	Mumthaz Moosa, Rafiyath Rameeza
2.	"Konkahala Lolhumeh"	Adam Haleem Adnan	Ibrahim Zaid Ali	Ibrahim Zaid Ali
3.	"Dhekefeemey"	Boi Ahmed Khaleel	Hussain Sobah	Hassan Ilham, Fathimath Zoona
4.	"Loabivaa Ey"	Mausoom Shakir	Hussain Sobah	Mumthaz Moosa, Moonisa Khaleel
5.	"Neydhen Ufaa"	Mohamed Abdul Ghanee	Hussain Sobah	Mohamed Abdul Ghanee
6.	"Dhekefeemey" (Slow Version)	Boi Ahmed Khaleel	Hussain Sobah	Rafiyath Rameeza

== Release and response ==
Upon release, the film received mixed reviews from critics. Ahmed Naif from Sun displeased with its predictable storyline wrote: "The use of flashbacks and character introduction was lame. Neither the order of scenes nor its transactions are worth being mentioned. The only good thing about this movie is Sheela Najeeb's performance; which is clearly the best I have witnessed during the year from a heroine. Other reviewers in favor of its music, cinematography and Sheela's performance while the "weak plot" and storyline were criticised. Twenty two housefull shows of the film were screened at cinema, making it the second highest-grossing Maldivian release of the year.

== Accolades ==
Award	Category	Recipients	Result	Ref.
6th Gaumee Film Awards	Best Supporting Actress	Sheela Najeeb	Nominated	
6th Gaumee Film Awards	Best Male Playback Singer	Ibrahim Ali for "Kon Kahala Lolhumeh"	Nominated	
