= Fathimath Nahula =

Maldivian film director, producer and screenwriter

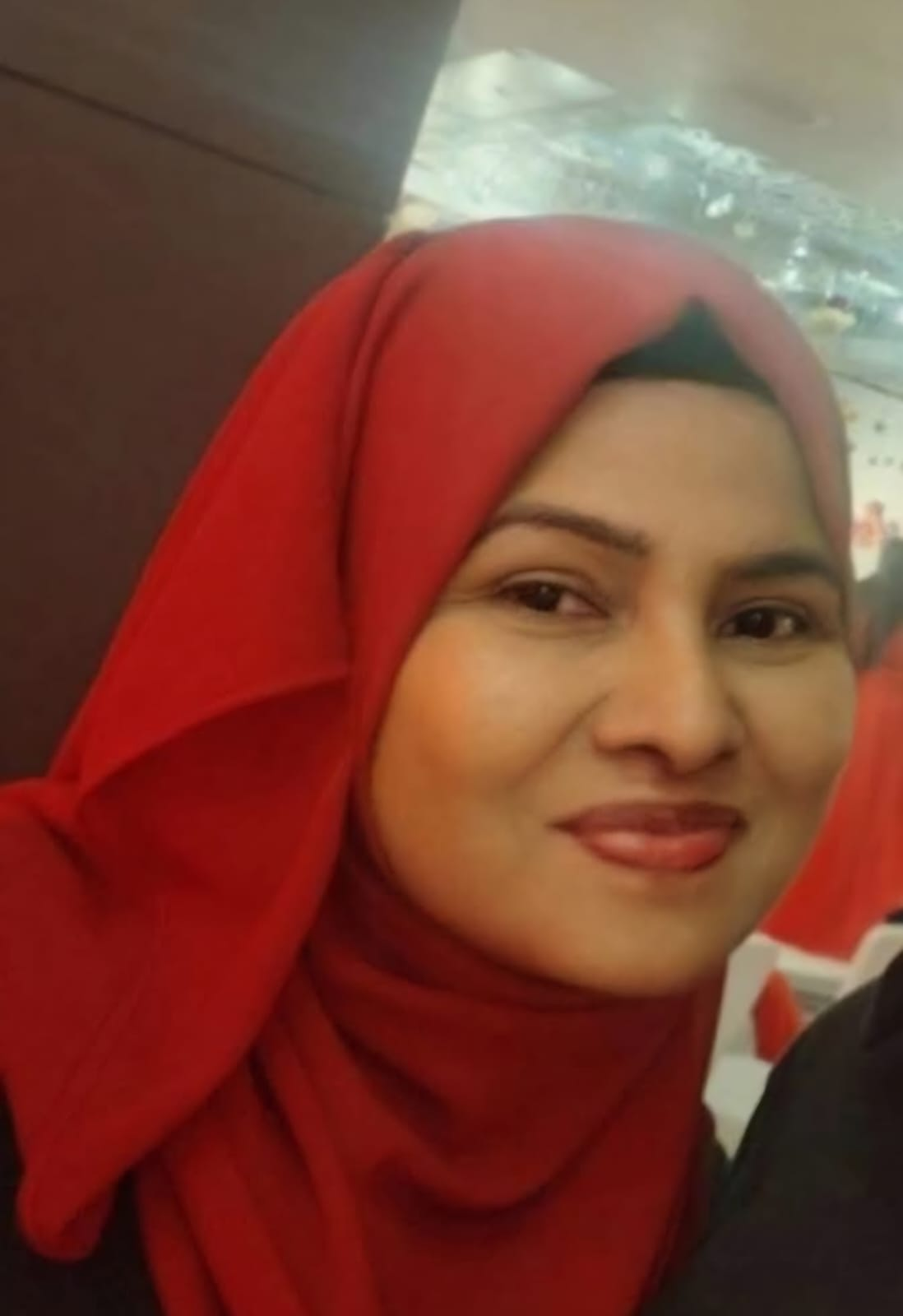
- Nahula receiving the National Award of Recognition, 2009
- Born: 22 June 1973 (age 53)
- Occupations: director, producer, screenwriter
- Years active: 1998–present
- Spouse: Hassan Sinan
- Children: Mohamed Atheedh Sinan; Mariyam Enash Sinan; Ayesha Layaali Sinan

Fathimath Nahula (born 22 June 1973) is a Maldivian film director, film producer and screenwriter.

== Early life ==
In 1991, Nahula joined Jamaluddin school and worked as a teacher for four years. During the time, she spends most of her time in writing and developing stories. She then penned dialogues and stories for several films and television dramas produced by Television Maldives while publishing handful of them on different platforms including newspapers and magazines. Aiming to deliver the real emotions she write on the paper, Nahula decided to pursue a career in film direction.

== Career ==
=== 1998–2009: Early releases and Yoosuf ===
She entered the film industry as an assistant director on Abdulla Sujau's Laila (1997), which was based on a story she had earlier written though the screenplay was developed with the help of director, Abdulla Sujau. During the year, she was received the National Award of Recognition in the area of screenwriting. She then made her own directorial debut with the family drama Fahuneyvaa (1998) which portrays the love-conflict of a man choosing between a prominent stage performer and a deaf-mute poor girl. Featuring Hussain Sobah, Mariyam Nisha and Jamsheedha Ahmed in pivotal roles, the film received critical acclaim and was a declared a commercial "hit" by screening twenty six houseful shows at the cinema. Though her first two films were produced by different studios; Corona Arts and Dash Studio respectively, post Fahuneyvaa her next few releases were solely produced by Mapa. Her second directorial venture was Naaummeedhu (2000) which depicts the story of a happily married couple (Reeko Moosa Manik and Mariyam Nisha) whose life is shattered into pieces when they unintentionally invite a seductive woman (Jamsheedha Ahmed) into their life. The film receiving favorable reviews from critics was able to screen twenty eight houseful shows at Olympus Cinema, making it the highest grossing Maldivian film of the year.

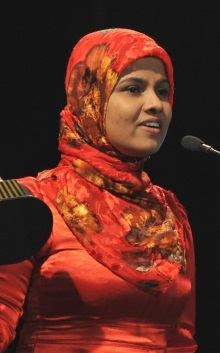
Nahula at 1st Maldives Film Awards ceremony, 2011

In 2002, Nahula worked as the assistant director in Ahmed Shimau family drama film Loabi Nuvevununama (2002) which stars Yoosuf Shafeeu, Mariyam Nazima, Moosa Zakariyya and Ahmed Shimau. Written by Fathimath Nahula, the story narrates the journey of a handicapped man who has been betrayed in love and unknowingly marries his brother's love interest. The film was a critical and commercial success. The following year, she released her third directorial venture; a romantic film Kalaayaanulaa (2003) which follows a happily married couple (Yoosuf Shafeeu and Aishath Shiranee) where the husband decided to marry his childhood best friend (Niuma Mohamed) when his wife fails to sexually please him. The film received widespread critical acclaim for its performances and was declared to be year's highest grossing Maldivian film release. Winning four Gaumee Film Awards and three Miadhu Crystal Awards, Nahula received a Gaumee Film Award nomination as the Best Director.

The series of success were continued with her next release; a critically appreciated and commercially prosperous project, a romantic drama film Zuleykha (2005) which narrates the journey of a nine years old girl seeking the lost love of her mother. Featuring an ensemble cast including Yoosuf Shafeeu, Sheela Najeeb, Mariyam Nisha, Ali Seezan, Mohamed Manik and Mariyam Enash Sinan, the film won five Gaumee Film Awards including the Best Story Award while she received another Gaumee Film Award nomination as the Best Director. Meanwhile, at Miadhu Crystal Awards ceremony, Zuleykha received eight awards including Best Director and Best Story. Thirty three houseful shows of the film were screened at the cinema making it the highest grossing Maldivian release of the year.

In 2008, Nahula released her most successful film; the romantic drama Yoosuf which depicts the story of a deaf and mute man who has been mistreated by a wealthy family, mocking his disability. Featuring an ensemble cast including Yoosuf Shafeeu, Niuma Mohamed, Sheela Najeeb, Mohamed Manik, Ahmed Nimal, Fauziyya Hassan, Ravee Farooq, Zeenath Abbas and Ahmed Lais Asim, the film is considered to include most prominent faces in a Maldivian film. The film received widespread critical acclaim and was attained a blockbuster status at box office. A total of forty five houseful shows were screened at Olympus Cinema before the film was leaked online, however the producers were able to screen five more shows at the cinema making it one of the Maldivian all-time highest grossing movies. The film was Maldivian official entry at 2009 SAARC Film Festivals and holds the privilege of being the opening movie of the festival. At 6th Gaumee Film Awards, Nahula was bestowed with Best Art Direction and Best Choreography award, while being nominated as the Best Director and Editor. The film, winning seven awards at 1st Maldives Film Awards, including Film of the Year (Viewer's Choice), Nahula was credited with a nomination as the Best Director. Her next directorial venture was the romantic drama film Soora (2008), directed along with Yoosuf Shafeeu. The film was originally released as a television series to positive response.

=== 2010–present: Expansion into film production ===
Later in 2010, Nahula wrote and co-produced Yoosuf Shafeeu's Veeraana, a drama film that deals with child sexual abuse. Starring Shafeeu, Niuma Mohamed and Amira Ismail the film received mixed to positive reviews from critics, praising the writer and director for touching a condemnatory topic though criticing its "over-the-top melodrama". Having a strong buzz prior its release, the film was proved to be a commercial success. Her next production was Ravee Farooq-directed romantic drama film Mihashin Furaana Dhandhen (2012), starring Niuma Mohamed, Mohamed Manik and Ali Seezan. Upon release, the film received mixed response from critics while Ahmed Nadheem of Haveeru noted the film as "the best Maldivian melodramatic film" he had seen in the past two years, though displeased with its similarities between two Bollywood films. At 3rd Maldives Film Awards, Nahula received a nomination for Best Screenplay and Best Costume Design.

In 2016, Nahula yet again occupied the director's seat alongside Ahmed Sinan for the horror film 4426; a genre she has not explored before. Upon release, the film received mostly positive reviews from critics. Ahmed Nadheem of Avas labelled the film as a "masterpiece" and wrote: "Nahula has arranged the sequences of the scenes a tidy note giving the viewers no space for complains in the plot. The only are she lacks the expertise; technical department is a revelation in this film compared to her previous works". However, it was also considered to be her "best performance" so far. Ahmed Adhushan reviewing for Mihaaru credited the screenplay of the film as its "hero". "Nahula has proved the industry that she is capable to write stories beyond romance". With twenty five houseful shows being screened, 4426 was declared as the highest-grossing Maldivian film of the year.

2018 was a dull year for Maldivian film-industry with regards to 2018 Maldivian presidential election. Her only release of the year was the first Maldivian web-series, a romantic drama, Huvaa. The series consisting of eighty two episodes and streamed through the digital platform Baiskoafu, centers around a happy and radiant family which breaks into despairing pieces after a tragic incident that led to an unaccountable loss. The pilot episode was viewed by more than 16,000 users at the time of release and was declared to be a success.

== Filmography ==
=== Feature film ===
Year	Title	Director	Writer	Editor	Notes	Ref(s)
1996	Fun Asaru		Yes			
1997	Hinithun		Yes			
1997	Laila		Yes		Worked as assistant director	
1998	Kuhveriya		Yes			
1998	Fahuneyvaa	Yes	Yes			
1998	Ethoofaaneerey		Yes			
1999	Umurah		Yes			
2000	Maazee		Yes			
2000	Saahibaa		Yes			
2001	Naaummeedhu	Yes	Yes			
2002	Loabi Nuvevununama		Yes		Worked as assistant director	
2003	Kalaayaanulaa	Yes	Yes		Nominated—Gaumee Film Award for Best Director	
2005	Zuleykha	Yes	Yes		Gaumee Film Award for Best Screenplay; Nominated—Gaumee Film Award for Best Director	
2008	Yoosuf	Yes	Yes	Yes	Nominated—Gaumee Film Award for Best Director; Nominated—Maldives Film Award for Best Director	
2010	Veeraana		Yes			
2010	Heyonuvaane		Yes			
2012	Mihashin Furaana Dhandhen		Yes		Nominated—Maldives Film Award for Best Screenplay	
2016	4426	Yes	Yes			
2017	Bos		Yes			
2025	Sorry	Yes	Yes			
2026	Majunoon	Yes	Yes			
2027	Gis	Yes	Yes			

=== Short film ===
Year	Title	Director	Producer	Writer	Notes	Ref(s)
2009	Bulhaa Dhombe		Yes	Yes	Co-written with Binma Ibrahim Waheedh	

=== Television ===
Year	Title	Director	Writer	Editor	Notes	Ref(s)
1994	Qurubaan		Yes			
1996	Badhunaamu	Yes	Yes			
1997	Ummeedhu	Yes	Yes			
1997	Oyaadhiya Hayaaiy	Yes	Yes			
1997–1999	Kahthiri		Yes		Co-written with Chilhiya Moosa Manik & Binmaa Ibrahim Waheed	
1998	Ehan'dhaan	Yes	Yes			
1998	Kulheybeybe	Yes	Yes			
1999	Zakham		Yes			
2003	Edhuvas En'buri Annaanenama	Yes	Yes			
2004-2005	Loabi Nulibunas		Yes			
2005	Kalaage Haqqugaa	Yes	Yes			
2005	Baiveriyaa		Yes			
2007-2008	Vimlaa		Yes			
2008	Soora	Yes	Yes	Yes	Co-directed with Yoosuf Shafeeu	
2012–2013	Adhives Eloaibah Gadharu Kuran	Yes	Yes			
2015	Vakivumuge Kurin	Yes	Yes		Co-directed with Aishath Rishmy; Co-written with Fathimath Neena	
2015–2016	Umurah Salaan	Yes	Yes		Co-directed with Mohamed Faisal	
2018–2020	Huvaa	Yes	Yes		Co-directed with Mohamed Faisal and Yoosuf Shafeeu	

== Accolades ==
Year	Award	Category	Nominated work	Result	Ref(s)
1998	National Award of Recognition	Screenwriting		Won	
2007	4th Gaumee Film Awards	Best Director	Zuleykha	Nominated	
2007	4th Gaumee Film Awards	Best Director	Kalaayaanulaa	Nominated	
2007	4th Gaumee Film Awards	Best Story	Zuleykha	Nominated	
2007	1st Miadhu Crystal Award	Best Director	Zuleykha	Won	
2007	1st Miadhu Crystal Award	Best Director	Kalaayaanulaa	Nominated	
2009	National Award of Recognition	Performing Arts - Film direction and production		Won	
2011	1st Maldives Film Awards	Best Director	Yoosuf	Nominated	
2014	3rd Maldives Film Awards	Best Screenplay	Mihashin Furaana Dhandhen	Nominated	
2015	6th Gaumee Film Awards	Best Director	Yoosuf	Nominated	
2015	6th Gaumee Film Awards	Best Editing	Yoosuf	Nominated	
2015	6th Gaumee Film Awards	Best Sound Editing	Yoosuf (Shared with Hussain Shuhadh)	Nominated	
2015	6th Gaumee Film Awards	Best Art Direction	Yoosuf	Won	
2015	6th Gaumee Film Awards	Best Choreography	"Mee Magey Haalathey" – Yoosuf (Shared with Ali Yooshau and Rustham Hassan)	Won	
2017	8th Gaumee Film Awards	Best Costume Design	4426 (Shared with Razeena Thaufeeq)	Nominated	
