= List of Maldivian films of 1997 =

This is a list of Maldivian films released in 1997.

== Releases ==
=== Feature film ===
Opening		Title	Director	Studio	Cast
MAR	03	Loabeega Aniyaa	Amjad Ibrahim	Farivaa Films	Mariyam Nisha; Hussain Sobah; Hamid Ali; Chilhiya Moosa Manik; Jamsheedha Ahmed
JUL	15	Laila	Abdulla Sujau	Corona Arts	Aishath Shiranee; Moosa Zakariyya; Aishath Zeeniya; Ali Shameel; Ahmed Shimau; Fathimath Neena
SEP	04	Fathis Handhuvaru	Easa Shareef	Slam Studio	Reeko Moosa Manik; Niuma Mohamed; Ali Shameel; Arifa Ibrahim; Hawwa Enee; Mariyam Sheleen
DEC	07	Dhefirin	Hamid Ali	Farivaa Films	Hassan Afeef; Jamsheedha Ahmed; Asad Shareef; Hamid Ali; Aminath Ibrahim Didi
NA		Hinithun	Amjad Ibrahim	Villager Maldives	Ismail Hilmy; Jamsheedha Ahmed; Hussain Mahir; Shaahzadha; Mariyam Rizula
NA		Heelaiy	Ahmed Mohamed Didi	Slam Studio	Reeko Moosa Manik; Aishath Shiranee; Arifa Ibrahim; Mohamed Waheed; Dhon Annaaru Rasheed

=== Television ===
This is a list of Maldivian series, in which the first episode was aired or streamed in 1997.

Opening		Title	Director(s)	Cast	Notes
NOV	12	Kahthiri	Mariyam Shaugee	Arifa Ibrahim; Ali Shameel; Hassan Afeef; Ahmed Giyas; Aishath Shiranee; Niuma Mohamed; Aminath Rasheedha; Neena Saleem; Ismail Wajeeh; Reeko Moosa Manik; Zeenath Abbas; Mariyam Rizula	78 episodes
NA		Dheben	Amjad Ibrahim	Jamsheedha Ahmed; Mohamed Ali; Suneetha Ali	Teledrama
NA		Huvafaiy		Aishath Shiranee; Ismail Wajeeh	
NA		Oyaadhiya Hayaaiy	Fathimath Nahula	Aishath Shiranee	
NA		Ummeedhu	Fathimath Nahula	Mariyam Nisha; Hussain Sobah; Ali Shameel	

== See also ==
- Lists of Maldivian films
