= List of Maldivian films of 1994 =

This is a list of Maldivian films released in 1994.

== Releases ==
=== Feature film ===
Opening		Title	Director	Studio	Cast
MAR	28	Dhevana An'bi	Ibrahim Rasheed	Farivaa Films	Hassan Afeef, Lillian Saeed, Mariyam Haajara, Chilhiya Moosa Manik, Arifa Ibrahim
NOV	04	Dheriyaa	Mohamed Niyaz	Eternal Pictures	Ali Khalid, Hawwa Zahira, Hawwa Riyaza, Arifa Ibrahim
NOV	11	Nafrathu	Abdulla Shujau	Farivaa Films	Aishath Shiranee, Nafiu Ali, Nooma Ibrahim, Ali Shameel, Arifa Ibrahim
NA		Zakham	Easa Shareef	Slam Studio	Hassan Afeef, Aishath Shiranee, Easa Shareef, Chilhiya Moosa Manik, Hassan Latheef, Mohamed Aboobakuru, Arifa Ibrahim
NA		Kulunu	Ali Waheed	Mapa	Aminath Muneera, Ismail Wajeeh, Aishath Shiranee
NA		Karuna	Ibrahim Rasheed	Farivaa Films	Hassan Afeef, Lillian Saeed, Ali Firaq, Chilhiya Moosa Manik
NA		Alathu Loabi	Easa Shareef	Slam Studio	Mohamed Shakeeb, Easa Shareef, Nadhiya Zahir, Niuma Abdul Raheem

=== Television ===
This is a list of Maldivian series, in which the first episode was aired or streamed in 1994.

Opening	Title	Director(s)	Cast	Notes
NA	Dhanthura		Aishath Shiranee, Reeko Moosa Manik, Arifa Ibrahim, Koyya Hassan Manik, Ali Shiyam	Teledrama
NA	Furusathu		Aishath Shiranee, Reeko Moosa Manik, Arifa Ibrahim, Koyya Hassan Manik	
NA	Hithi Thajuribaa	Mariyam Shauqee	Ali Shameel, Aminath Rasheedha, Niuma Mohamed, Arifa Ibrahim	7 episodes
NA	Inthizaaru		Aishath Shiranee, Ali Shameel, Hamid Ali, Nooma Ibrahim, Roanu Hassan Manik	13 episodes
NA	Manzil	Mariyam Shauqee; Arifa Ibrahim	Abdulla Munaz, Aishath Shiranee, Mariyam Nisha, Mohamed Aboobakuru, Arifa Ibrahim	
NA	Qurubaan	Mariyam Shauqee	Ahmed Giyas, Aishath Shiranee, Hawwa, Waleedha Waleed, Mohamed Asif	9 episodes

== See also ==
- Lists of Maldivian films
