= Mohamed Afrah =

Maldivian film actor and producer (1974–2019)

Mohamed Afrah Hassan
- Born: January 17, 1974; Th. Thimarafushi, Maldives
- Died: April 7, 2019 (aged 45); Male', Maldives
- Occupations: Actor, producer
- Years active: 2000–2010
- Spouse: 1
- Children: 3

Mohamed Afrah Hassan, commonly known as Mohamed Afrah (17 January 1974 – 7 April 2019) was a Maldivian film actor and producer.

== Career ==
Afrah was featured in the most successful Maldivian film of 2000, Ahmed Nimal's horror classic Zalzalaa, where he played the traumatized son observing supernatural events in his family. The film follows a man who lost his life and endangering his whole family while being lured by a female spirit sent off to complete an unfulfilled prophecy. Afrah's first release in 2001 was Ali Shameel's drama film Hithi Nimun, starred alongside Mariyam Nisha, Mohamed Shavin and Sheereen Abdul Wahid, which follows the storyline of a stubborn young man (played by Shavin) who abandons his girlfriend when he discovers about her pregnancy. In his second release of the year, Afrah was featured in Aslam Rasheed's romantic thriller film Dheevaanaa (2001) which was an unofficial remake of Ram Gopal Varma's romantic thriller Pyaar Tune Kya Kiya (2001) starring Urmila Matondkar, Fardeen Khan and Sonali Kulkarni. The film narrates the story of a woman who falls in love with an already married photographer and sets out to get what she wants, no matter what the consequences may be. He also starred in Ahmed Nimal's Sababu starred opposite Ibrahim Giyas and Aishath Shiranee where he played a man lusted after his classmate.

In 2003, Afrah played a supporting role in Imad Ismail-directed horror film Araamagu Dhonkamana (2003), co-starring Mariyam Shazna, Assadh Shareef and Mariyam Nazima. The film narrates the story of a woman spirit who rises from the sea and marries a toddy extractor, disguised as a human being. The following year, Afrah played a brief role in Abdul Fattah's horror film Eynaa (2004), which appears Sheela Najeeb, Mohamed Manik, Ahmed Shah, Khadheeja Ibrahim Didi, Ibrahim Jihad and Nashidha Mohamed as six colleagues who go on a picnic to a haunted uninhabited island and their battle for survival. The film garnered critical appreciation specially for its technical department and was a commercial success.

In 2009, Afrah starred and produced Loaiybahtakaa which was written and directed by Yoosuf Shafeeu. The romantic drama, co-starring Yoosuf Shafeeu, Sheela Najeeb, Fathimath Fareela and Mohamed Faisal, tells the story of unrequited love, and proved to be a commercial success. Mohamed's last film release was Abdul Fahtah's horror film Jinni (2010) cast alongside Ali Seezan, Amira Ismail and Mariyam Afeefa. Based on true incidents that occurred in an island of Maldives, she played the friend of Javid who has been enthralled by a ghost. Prior to release the film was marketed to be full of "suspense and uniqueness" compared to other "mediocre" Maldivian horror films. Upon release, the film received mixed reviews from critics; majority of them complaining for having the "same old feeling" of prior horror flicks though the performance were noted to be satisfactory. Despite the mixed reviews, the film witnessed a positive response at the box office, screening a total of twenty two housefull shows in Male', declaring it as a Mega-Hit.

== Death ==
On 7 April 2019, Afrah was found dead lying on his bed at around 9:30 (Maldivian time) after he failed to wake up for breakfast. He was pronounced dead on taking to Indira Gandhi Memorial Hospital. His funeral prayer was performed at Aasahara Mosque after Isha prayer.

== Filmography ==
=== Feature film ===
| Year | Title | Role | Notes | Ref(s) |
|---|---|---|---|---|
| 1999 | Sababu | Mohamed | | |
| 2000 | Saahibaa | Waseem | | |
| 2000 | Shaalinee | Moosa | | |
| 2000 | Zalzalaa | Shahid | | |
| 2001 | Hithi Nimun | Shakeel | | |
| 2001 | Dheevaanaa | Farooq | | |
| 2003 | Araamagu Dhonkamana | Moosa | | |
| 2004 | Eynaa | Unnamed | | |
| 2009 | Loaiybahtakaa | Himself | Also the producer | |
| 2010 | Jinni | Javid's friend | | |

=== Television ===
| Year | Title | Role | Notes | Ref(s) |
|---|---|---|---|---|
| 2004 | Thiyey Mihithuge Vindhakee | Fauzy | Recurring role; 3 episodes | |
| 2005–2006 | Kuramey Vadhaaee Salaam | Shamin | Guest role; "Episode 1" | |
| 2006 | Hinithun Velaashey Kalaa | Doctor | Guest role; "Episode 12" | |

=== Short film ===
| Year | Title | Role | Notes |
|---|---|---|---|
| 2007 | Nudhaashe Dhookohfaa Loabivaa | Ali | |
| 2007 | Thandi Rondi | Thandi Rondi | |
| 2008 | Kurafi Dhaadha | Kurafi Dhaadha | |
