= Ali Shameel =

Maldivian actor and director (born 1966)

- Born: 30 June 1966 (age 60); Malé, Maldives
- Occupations: Actor, director
- Years active: 1992–present

Ali Shameel is a Maldivian film actor and director.

== Career ==
In 1986, Shameel took part in a stage-play titled CDS-6, alongside Kashima Shakir, Mohamed Rasheed and Chilhiya Moosa Manik which was appreciated among the audience and he continues to feature in several other stage dramas. In 1992, Shameel made his career debut in Ahmed Sharmeel and Ibrahim Waheed's family drama film Dhon Manma (1992) alongside Haajara Abdul Kareem, Ibrahim Shakir and Sharmeel. The film tells the story of a step-mother who strives to create a bond with her step-kids. This was followed by his performance as a violent boyfriend in the Abdulla Shujau's Nafrathu (1994) starring opposite Aishath Shiranee and written by himself. Shameel also appeared in a Television Maldives production, Fun Asaru (1996) which follows two women; one searching for her mother and one fighting cancer.

Easa Shareef's horror film Fathis Handhuvaru was released in 1997, in which Shameel starred opposite Reeko Moosa Manik and Niuma Mohamed. The film tells a conflicting love story of a married young woman who falls in love with a ghost and the consequences when her family expands from either side. He played the character Ihusan, a man being married to a fearless lady who has been trapped in the powers of a ghost. The film is celebrated as the most successful Maldivian film with the highest number of shows screened upon release. It was also widely appreciated by the critics and was considered to be the "all time favorite" Maldivian film. The same year, he played the role of a caring father in Abdulla Sujau-directed Laila (1997), followed by his collaboration with Faththaah for the romantic drama series, Aisha (1998) where he played the caring friend of an abusive husband. Mariyam Shauqee's widely acclaimed family drama television series Kahthiri was released during the same year, where he played the role of a taxi driver and a father of a Thalassemia patient, living in a congested housing complex while dealing with several social issues.

In 2000, Shameel played the role of Saleem, the college principal, in Hussain Adil's romance Hiyy Halaaku. The plot combines two love triangles set years apart. The first half covers friends on a college campus, while the second tells the story of a widower's young daughter who tries to reunite her dad with his old friend. The film was an unofficial remake of Karan Johar's romantic drama film Kuch Kuch Hota Hai (1998) starring Shah Rukh Khan, Kajol and Rani Mukerji in the lead roles.

It was followed by the year's most successful Maldivian film, Ahmed Nimal's horror classic Zalzalaa (2000) where Shameel played the role of Ibrahim, a hardworking father who gets enthralled by a female jinn. The film follows a man who lost his life and endangered his whole family while being lured by a female spirit sent off to complete an unfulfilled prophecy. The same year, he starred opposite Mariyam Haleem in the Easa Shareef-directed romantic horror film 2000 Vana Ufan Dhuvas (2000), in which he portrays the role of a cursed father lying on death bed.

The following year, he starred as the father of an obsessive lover in Aslam Rasheed's romantic thriller film Dheevaanaa which was an unofficial remake of Ram Gopal Varma's romantic thriller Pyaar Tune Kya Kiya (2001) starring Urmila Matondkar, Fardeen Khan and Sonali Kulkarni. The film narrates the story of a woman who falls in love with an already married photographer and sets out to get what she wants, no matter what the consequences may be. It was followed by his drama film Hithi Nimun (2001) featuring opposite Mohamed Shavin and Sheereen Abdul Wahid, which narrates the storyline of a stubborn young man who abandons his girlfriend when he discovers about her pregnancy.

He then stepped into Fathimath Nahula's critically and commercially successful romantic drama television series, Kalaage Haqqugaa (2005) to portray the role of Faiz, a depressive father mourning over his deceased son. He rose to widespread prominence in the television industry with his performance as a businessman and protective father in the Arifa Ibrahim-directed critically acclaimed television series, Vairoalhi Ahves Sirrun (2005) which revolves around two best-friends involved in extra-marital affairs and who fail to practice their duty as husband and wife. Starring alongside Niuma Mohamed, Lufshan Shakeeb, Ahmed Asim, Aminath Rasheedha and Mariyam Shakeela, the series was listed as one of the most successful television series. The following year, he again collaborated with the team of Vairoalhi Ahves Sirrun for Arifa Ibrahim's another romantic television drama series, Vaguthu Faaithu Nuvanees (2006) which consists of fifty episodes. The series which follows the vengeance and retribution two best-friends go through when they both love the same person, features Mohamed in a conflicted role a husband hiding the truth of his first marriage.

In 2008, he appeared in Fathimath Nahula's romantic drama film, Yoosuf which depicts the story of a deaf and mute man (played by Yoosuf Shafeeu) who has been mistreated by a wealthy family, mocking his disability. Featuring an ensemble cast including Yoosuf Shafeeu, Sheela Najeeb, Mohamed Manik, Ahmed Nimal, Fauziyya Hassan, Ravee Farooq, Zeenath Abbas and Ahmed Lais Asim, the film is considered to include the most prominent actors in a Maldivian film. He played the role of a judge hearing the statements regarding a family conflict. The film received widespread critical acclaim and was attained a blockbuster status at the box office. The film was the Maldivian official entry at 2009 SAARC Film Festivals and holds the privilege of being the opening film of the festival. The next year, he collaborated with Amjad Ibrahim for his horror film Baaraige Fas, cast alongside Mariyam Nisha, Hussain Sobah, Amira Ismail, and Mariyam Shakeela. The film follows a temptress vampire who goes into a killing spree to quench her thirst. The film received mainly negative reviews.

Shameel began 2011 in a brief role as a friend of Faheema who has been arrested for being allegedly involved in counterfeit dollars business, in the Moomin Fuad-directed crime tragedy drama Loodhifa. Featuring an ensemble cast, the film deals with modern social issues in society told from the different perspectives of the characters. Made on a budget of MVR 600,000, the film was declared a commercial failure though it received wide critical acclaim. It was followed by Amjad Ibrahim's suspense thriller film Hafaraaiy in which hec starred alongside Amira Ismail, Mariyam Shakeela, Yoosuf Shafeeu and Fathimath Fareela, which was a critical and commercial failure. Based on a real incident, the film narrates a story of a cannibal woman addicted to eating human flesh, how she victimised the inhabitants with her face covered in a veil. The film received criticism for its "fragile" plot, "unnecessary" characters though its makeup was appreciated. Ahmed Naif from Sun wrote: "neither scientifically nor psychologically, it has been proven in the film how a chicken addict turns to be a cannibal. The film slides from a suspense thriller to a comedy for its inclusion of inconceivable details". He again collaborated with Amjad Ibrahim for his family drama Hithey Dheymee (2011) which received negative reviews from critics and was a box office failure.

Shameel's only release of 2012 was Abdul Faththaah's romantic film Love Story alongside Ali Seezan and Aishath Rishmy. He played the role of an island chief while his performance and film received a negative response from critics. Displeased with the screenplay and performance of the actors, Nadheem of Haveeru wrote: "None of the actors were given scope to build their characters and none was able to justify their character. With excessive emotional scenes, actors were exposed to over-acting and nothing more".

== Filmography ==
=== Feature film ===
Year	Title	Role	Notes	Ref(s)
1992	Dhon Manma	Shareef		
1994	Nafrathu	Nahid	Also the writer	
1996	Fun Asaru	Hana's uncle		
1997	Laila	Faiz		
1997	Fathis Handhuvaru	Ihusan		
1997	Heelaiy	Adhil	Special appearance	
1998	Dhauvaa	Hassan Manik		
2000	2000 Vana Ufan Dhuvas	Mohamed Fulhu		
2000	Hiyy Halaaku	Saleem		
2000	Zalzalaa	Ibrahim		
2000	Saahibaa	Fahumee		
2000	Namoonaa			
2001	Dheevaanaa	Anwar		
2001	Hithi Nimun	Ahmed	Also the director	
2004	Dharinnahtakai	Muneez		
2004	Hama Himeyn	Adnan		
2008	Yoosuf	Judge		
2009	Baaraige Fas	Nizar		
2010	Vakinuvinama	Waheed		
2011	Loodhifa	Saleem		
2011	Hafaraaiy			
2011	Hithey Dheymee	Shameel		
2011	E Bappa	Sheeza's step-father	Special appearance	
2012	Love Story	Rishfa's father		
2017	Bos	Maish's father		
2024	Udhabaani 2			
2025	Sorry	Jabir		
2026	Keevve? †	Yaugoob		

=== Television ===
Year	Title	Role	Notes	Ref(s)
1994	Hithi Thajuribaa	Saleem	Main role	
1994	Inthizaaru	Saleem	Main role	
1996	Badhunaam	Wafir (Vaakudey)	Teledrama	
1996	Riheyfai Mahchah Foi	Shiyan	Teledrama	
1997–1999	Kahthiri	Mausoom	Main role; 78 episodes	
1998–1999	Aisha	Saleem	Main role	
2000	Dharifulhu	Saleem	Teledrama	
2003	Ujaalaa Raasthaa	Adamfulhu	Main role; 13 episodes	
2003–2004	Vaisoori	Various roles	7 segments; 33 episodes	
2003–2004	Thiyey Mihithuge Vindhakee	Abdul Samad Hussain	Recurring role; 7 episodes	
2004	Kamana Vareh Neiy	Yoonus	Main role; 5 episodes	
2005	Kalaage Haqqugaa	Faiz	Main role; 13 episodes	
2005–2006	Vairoalhi Ahves Sirrun	Naseer	Main role; 52 episodes	
2006–2007	Vaguthu Faaithu Nuvanees	Saleem	Recurring role; 50 episodes	
2007-2008	Vimlaa	Vimla's father		
2008	Manzilakee Thee Ey Magey		Main role; 26 episodes	
2009	Mohamma Gaadiyaa	Yoosube	Recurring role; 4 episodes	
2016	Bithufangi 2			
2019–2020	Haasaa	Ramzy	Main role; 11 episodes	
2020	Hanaa	Hameedh	Main role; 13 episodes	
2021	Rumi á Jannat	Nadhir's neighbor	Guest role; Episode: "Keefahu Mashah Rann"	
2022	Giritee Loabi	Faheem	Guest role; "Episode 14"	
2022	Bridge	Saleem	Main role; 10 episodes	
2022	Yasna	Shareef	Main role; 15 episodes	
2022	Dark Rain Chronicles	Yasir	Main role in the segment "Party"	

=== Short film ===
Year	Title	Role	Notes	Ref(s)
2006	Nukan'daa	Khalidh		
2007	Jinneenge Dharubaaru	Dhon Rahabeyya		
2007	Magey Dharifulhu	Ahmed Nashid		
2007	Nama Nama Usmaan	Usman		
2007	E Soru	Idrees		
2007	Nukandaa 2	Khalidh		
2007	E Soru 2	Idrees		
2007	Badi Edhuru	Investigation Officer		
2008	No Money Full Beggy	Katheeb		
2008	Dhanthura	Ishqee Abdul		
2009	Dheulhi Ehnuvi Dhiulhi	Shakir		
2009	Fahun Rangalhuvaane	Dhon Seedhi	Also the director	
2009	Dhanna Nudhanna	Usman		
2009	Beyinsaafu	Magistrate		
2009	Fahun Rangalhuvaane 2	Dhon Seedhi	Also the writer and director	
2010	Dhanna Nudhanna 2	Usman		

== Accolades ==
Year	Award	Category	Nominated work	Result	Ref(s)
1998	Aafathis Awards - 1997	Best Supporting Actor	Fathis Handhuvaru	Won	
