= 1st Gaumee Film Awards =

- Date: January 15, 1995

Highlights
- Best Film: Dheriyaa
- Most awards: Dheriyaa (7)

The 1st Gaumee Film Awards ceremony, presented by Ministry of Information and Culture, honored the best Maldivian films released before 1995. The ceremony was held between 15 January to 30 January 1995.

== Winners ==
=== Main awards ===
Nominees were announced in November 2007.

Best Feature Film: Dheriyaa	Best Director: Mohamed Niyaz – Dheriyaa
Best Actor: Ismail Wajeeh – Ihsaas	Best Actress: Hawwa Zahira – Dheriyaa
Best Regional Film: Dhon Manma	Jury's Award: Fathimath Rashfa – Dheriyaa; Haajara Abdul Kareem – Dhon Manma
Best Supporting Actor: Reeko Moosa Manik – Ihsaas	Best Supporting Actress: Aishath Shiranee – Kulunu
Best Original Song: Dadli Jayawardana - "Heeveyey Kalaa Dhekefaa" - Jazubaathu	Best Lyricist: Abdul Qadir - "Vaane Kesseh Loabeega" - Maavaharuge Hadhiyaa
Best Playback Singer – Male: Mohamed Huzam - "Loabi Maquboolu Nuvee" - Jazubaathu	Best Playback Singer – Female: Fathimath Rauf - "Loabin Ujaalaa" - Dhon Manma
Best Melody: Umar Zahir - "E Ufaathakaa" - Karuna

=== Technical awards ===
Best Editing: Mohamed Niyaz – Dheriyaa	Best Cinematography: Hassan Haleem, Mohamed Manik – Dheriyaa
Best Makeup: Ismail Wajeeh, Mohamed Hilmy – Ihsaas	Best Special Effects: Hussain Rasheed – Karuna
Best Dialogue: Fathimath Rameeza, Ahmed Sharumeel – Udhaas	Best Story: Hussain Rasheed, Abdullah Rasheed – Beyvafaa
Best Setting: Abdul Muhaimin, Mohamed Niyaz – Dheriyaa	Best Background Music: Ahmed Affaal, Ahmed Amir – Dheriyaa

=== Documentary category ===
Best Documentary Film	Best Director
Television Maldives – Beyond The Dreams	Hussain Mohamed, Mohamed Manik – Beyond The Dreams
Best Cinematography	Best Editor
Mohamed Manik – Beyond The Dreams	Hussain Suhaadh – Beyond The Dreams

== See also ==
- Gaumee Film Awards
