= Hithi Nimun =

2001 Maldivian drama film directed by Ali Shamee

- Official film poster
- Directed by: Ali Shameel
- Written by: Aslam Rasheed
- Screenplay by: Aslam Rasheed
- Produced by: Aslam Rasheed
- Starring: Mohamed Shavin; Mariyam Nisha; Sheereen Abdul Wahid
- Cinematography: Ibrahim Moosa
- Edited by: Hussain Suhaad; Mujuthaba Rasheed
- Music by: Imad Ismail
- Production company: Slam Studio
- Release date: 2001
- Country: Maldives
- Language: Dhivehi

Hithi Nimun is a 2001 Maldivian drama film directed by Ali Shameel. Produced by Aslam Rasheed under Slam Studio, the film stars Mohamed Shavin, Mariyam Nisha, Mohamed Afrah and Sheereen Abdul Wahid in pivotal roles.

== Premise ==
Junaid Ahmed (Mohamed Shavin), Shakeel (Hassan Afeef) and Nazima (Mariyam Nisha) are school graduates. Shakeel who is deeply in love with Nazima failed to propose to her when she discovers that Nazima is in a romantic relationship with Junaid. In order to attain higher studies and pursue a successful career, Junaid relocates to Male' where he works as the servant in the house with Khalid (Hassan Afeef) and his wife, Fareedha (Neena Saleem). While Khalid and Fareedha were abroad, Junaid meets Raniya (Sheereen Abdul Wahid) in a deliberate accident and shows off his fake status, impressing Raniya and her mother (Arifa Ibrahim). Meanwhile, Junaid receives a letter from Nazima informing about her pregnancy while requesting him to marry her urgently to conceal the truth from spreading.

== Cast ==
- Mohamed Shavin as Junaid Ahmed
- Mariyam Nisha as Nazima
- Sheereen Abdul Wahid as Raniya
- Mohamed Afrah as Shakeel
- Hassan Afeef as Khalid
- Neena Saleem as Fareedha
- Arifa Ibrahim as Raniya's mother
- Chilhiya Moosa Manik as Katheeb
- Ibrahim Shakir as Fareedha's father
- Ali Shameel as Ahmed

== Soundtrack ==
Track listing
No.	Title	Lyrics	Singer(s)	Length
1.	"Mihithah Libeyney Ufaa Loabin"	Mariyam Waheedha	Imaadh Ismail, Mariyam Waheedha
2.	"Haaufaa Dhin Loabiveriyaa"	Mariyam Waheedha	Mariyam Waheedha
3.	"Sirru Sirrun Annaashey"	Mariyam Waheedha	Althaf Shakir, Fazeela Amir
4.	"Badhalugaa Heyo Kamuge"	Mariyam Waheedha	Ali Rameez
