= Hiiy Edhenee =

2001 Maldivian romantic drama film by Aishath Ali Manik

- Official film poster
- Directed by: Aishath Ali Manik
- Screenplay by: Easa Shareef; Ahmed Nimal
- Starring: Asad Shareef; Sheela Najeeb; Ali Seezan; Niuma Mohamed
- Edited by: Easa Shareef; Ahmed Amir
- Music by: Hussain Sobah
- Production company: EMA Productions
- Release date: 2001
- Country: Maldives
- Language: Dhivehi

Hiiy Edhenee is a 2001 Maldivian romantic drama film directed by Aishath Ali Manik. Produced under EMA Productions, the film stars Asad Shareef, Sheela Najeeb, Ali Seezan and Niuma Mohamed in pivotal roles. The film was an unofficial remake of Dharmesh Darshan's romantic film Dhadkan (2000)

== Premise ==
Sheleen Yoosuf (Sheela Najeeb), a young woman who hails from an extremely rich and influential family is romantically linked up with Shaheen (Asad Shareef), a very poor man. When Sheleen comes to her parents with the proposal of marrying Shaheen, she is rebuked and gets an outright refusal for his bad manners and arrogant outlook. Instead they arranged her marriage with a boy from a respected family, Vishal Amir (Ali Seezan) whom Sheleen finally marries to keep her parents happy.

== Cast ==
- Asad Shareef as Shahin
- Sheela Najeeb as Sheleen Yoosuf
- Ali Seezan as Vishal Amir
- Niuma Mohamed as Leena
- Arifa Ibrahim as Shahin's mother
- Ahmed Nimal as Vishal's step-father
- Easa Shareef as Mohamed Yoosuf (Sheleen's father)
- Ibrahim Wisan as Afey (Vishal's half brother)
- Aishath Gulfa as Suzy (Vishal's half sister)
- Ajvad Waheed as Afeef
- Suneetha Ali (Special appearance)
- Ahmed Amir as Saleem

== Soundtrack ==
Track listing
No.	Title	Lyrics	Singer(s)	Length
1.	"Hiyy Edhenee"	Easa Shareef	Abdul Hannan Moosa Didi, Fathimath Zoona	5:51
2.	"Hiyy Ves Dhen Fisaari Moyaey" (Version 1)	Easa Shareef	Abdul Baaree, Fathimath Zoona, Abdul Hannan Moosa Didi	7:06
3.	"Hiyy Ves Dhen Fisaari Moyaey" (Version 2)	Easa Shareef	Abdul Baaree, Fathimath Zoona	5:47
4.	"Hiyy Edheny" (Sad Version)	Easa Shareef	Abdul Hannan Moosa Didi	5:14
5.	"Hoa Hoa Govamun"	Easa Shareef	Ali Rameez, Fathimath Zoona	6:36
6.	"Furusathu Libi Dhuniyeyga"	Easa Shareef	Fathimath Zoona	5:42

== Accolades ==
Year	Award	Category	Recipients	Result	Ref.
2007	3rd Gaumee Film Awards	Best Actor	Ali Seezan	Won	
