= Araamagu Dhonkamana =

2003 Maldivian film

- Official film poster
- Directed by: Imad Ismail
- Written by: Abdulla Sodiq
- Produced by: Aslam Rasheed
- Starring: Asad Shareef; Mariyam Shazna; Mohamed Afrah; Mariyam Nazima
- Cinematography: Ibrahim Moosa
- Edited by: Mohamed Afrah
- Music by: Imad Ismail
- Production company: Slam Studio
- Release date: 1 May 2003
- Country: Maldives
- Language: Dhivehi

Araamagu Dhonkamana is a 2003 Maldivian horror film written and directed by Imad Ismail. Produced by Aslam Rasheed under Slam Studio, the film stars Asad Shareef, Mariyam Shazna, Mohamed Afrah and Mariyam Nazima in pivotal roles. Shooting of the film took place in K. Kaashidhoo.

== Premise ==
The film narrates the story of a woman spirit who rises from the sea and marries a toddy extractor, Dhon Ahammad (Assadh Shareef). The man, believing she is a human being, marries her and lives a happy life until a wise man exposes her real truth to Dhon Ahammad.

== Cast ==
- Mariyam Shazna as Dhon Kamana
- Asad Shareef as Dhon Ahammad
- Mariyam Nazima as Faathuma
- Mohamed Afrah as Moosa
- Chilhiya Moosa Manik as Mudhimbe
- Yazeedh Ismail as Sidhuqee
- Shifa as Jameela
- Saleem as Thahkhaan

== Soundtrack ==
Track listing
No.	Title	Singer(s)	Length
1.	"Hiyy Nufilaaney"	Lahfa Faiz, Ahmed Falah
2.	"Kanzu Dhonkaman"	Asim Thaufeeq	4:33
3.	"Heekuranee Mee Thedhey"	Mariyam Unoosha
4.	"Raivaru Kiyamun"	Mukhthar Adam

== Accolades ==
Year	Award	Category	Recipients	Result	Ref.
2007	Miadhu Crystal Award	Best Sound Effects	Araamagu Dhonkamana	Won	
2007	Miadhu Crystal Award	Best Screen Award (Jury)	Araamagu Dhonkamana	Won	
