= Rihun =

- Official film poster
- Directed by: Hussain Shihab
- Written by: Hussain Shihab
- Screenplay by: Hussain Shihab
- Produced by: Mapa; Gulfam Films
- Starring: Ismail Wajeeh; Aishath Shiranee; Fathimath Neena; Hamid Wajeeh; Aminath Rasheedha
- Cinematography: Ali Waheed
- Edited by: Ali Waheed
- Music by: I.D
- Release date: 2000
- Country: Maldives
- Language: Dhivehi

Rihun (transl. Pain) is a 2000 Maldivian drama film directed by Hussain Shihab. Produced by Mapa and Gulfam Films, the film stars Ismail Wajeeh, Aishath Shiranee, Fathimath Neena, Hamid Wajeeh and Aminath Rasheedha in pivotal roles.

== Premise ==
Unaiz (Ismail Wajeeh) a successful post graduate, currently working at his mother's office, is sent on an official trip to a nearby island where he starts an affair with Shehenaz (Fathimath Neena). They marry despite Unaiz's workaholic mother (Aminath Rasheedha) dismisses the plan since she believes a marriage is an obstruction to a successful life. Enraged, she tries desperate attempts to separate Shehanz and Unaiz.

== Cast ==
- Ismail Wajeeh as Unaiz
- Aishath Shiranee as Maana
- Fathimath Neena as Shehenaz
- Hamid Wajeeh as Riza
- Aminath Rasheedha as Saba
- Mohamed Hussain Shihab
- Ahmed Nimal as Athif (Special appearance)
- Fathimath Rameeza as Nisha (Special appearance)

== Soundtrack ==
Track listing
No.	Title	Lyrics	Music	Singer(s)	Length
1.	"Astha Thiya Mooney"	Mausoom Shakir	Mohamed Imthiyaz	Umar Zahir
2.	"Aa Handheh Noone Thee Hama Yageen"	Hussain Shihab	Mohamed Imthiyaz	Umar Zahir
3.	"Aashiqaa Edhemey"	Hussain Shihab	Mohamed Imthiyaz	Shifa Thaufeeq, Umar Zahir
4.	"Vaaney Loabi Vazan"	Hussain Shihab	Mohamed Imthiyaz	Umar Zahir, Shifa Thaufeeq
5.	"Ehandhaan Iyaadha Kuramey" (Male version)	Hussain Shihab	Mohamed Imthiyaz	Umar Zahir
6.	"Aadheyhey Kuraa Mee Hithun"	Hussain Shihab	Mohamed Imthiyaz	Umar Zahir, Shifa Thaufeeq
7.	"Dheynan Jaanaa Hithaa"	Hussain Shihab	Mohamed Imthiyaz	Shifa Thaufeeq
8.	"Ehandhaan Iyaadha Kuramaa" (Female version)	Hussain Shihab	Mohamed Imthiyaz	Shifa Thaufeeq
