= Kalaayaanulaa =

- Official film poster
- Directed by: Fathimath Nahula
- Written by: Fathimath Nahula
- Screenplay by: Fathimath Nahula
- Starring: Yoosuf Shafeeu; Niuma Mohamed; Aishath Shiranee
- Cinematography: Mohamed Rasheed
- Edited by: Sadha Ahmed
- Music by: Hussain Sobah
- Production company: Mapa
- Release date: March 25, 2003
- Running time: 147 minutes
- Country: Maldives
- Language: Dhivehi

Kalaayaanulaa (transl. Without you) is a 2003 Maldivian romantic film written and directed by Fathimath Nahula. Produced under Mapa, the film stars Yoosuf Shafeeu, Niuma Mohamed and Aishath Shiranee playing pivotal roles.

== Premise ==
Nashid (Yoosuf Shafeeu) and Eenaz (Niuma Mohamed) are childhood best friends who get separated when Nashid has to move abroad. Despite having grown up and drifting apart, Eenaz continues to miss Nashid dearly. A decade later on her birthday, Nashid unexpectedly returns and shows up at her doorstep. After reconnecting, Nashid invites Eenaz to a reunion party with their old group of friends. At this party, Nashid introduces his wife Leena (Aishath Shiranee) to Eenaz, breaking her heart as she had fallen in love with him. However, she chooses to keep her feelings secret out of respect for her friend's marriage.

Leena, who had previously gotten into a car accident was advised by her doctors to avoid pregnancy for three years. However, a year and a half in, Leena gets pregnant by avoiding taking her birth control pills and unknowingly risks her life. Despite hers and Nashid's best efforts, Leena ends up having a miscarriage.

Meanwhile, Eenaz's manager, Madhih (Asad Shareef), who had continuously sexually harassed her at work, comes to her parents asking for marriage approval to taunt her further. Eenaz eventually agrees to marry him as she is desperate to move on from Nashid.

5 years later, Eenaz is trapped in a loveless, unhappy, and abusive marriage. Nashid's and Leena's life in the bedroom have taken a toll as Leena's health conditions post-miscarriage make it difficult for them to make love. They try many treatment options, but nothing seems to work. Eenaz discovers that Madhih has been having an extramarital affair behind her back and confronts him, angering Madhih. Nashid walks in on Madhih hitting Eenaz and rescues her. He offers her his support and helps her get a divorce from Madhih. He also offers her a job at his company as his personal secretary to help her get back on her feet. The two get closer once again and Nashid realizes that Eenaz loves him. He also realizes that he wants to keep her happy and safe. Eager to fulfill his needs in the bedroom, Nashid proposes a polygamous marriage to Eenaz as he is unwilling to divorce Leena. After a lot of disagreement, Leena agrees to the arrangement vowing to get better treatment abroad to cure her condition. She meets and warns Eenaz that this arrangement would be temporary, and that Nashid would always prioritize her. Eenaz, despite knowing Nashid's intentions and that he may never truly love her decides to marry him regardless.

As Nashid and Eenaz embark on their married life and engage in a mostly physical relationship, Leena goes abroad and seeks treatment determined to have Nashid all to herself once again. Just as Eenaz and Nashid start getting closer emotionally, Leena returns having cured her condition once and for all. This leads to Nashid spending most of his time with Leena, neglecting Eenaz. Eenaz, realizing that Nashid would never love her the way she does, decides to separate from him. She leaves Nashid to spend the rest of his life with his one true love Leena, after revealing to them that she is now pregnant with Nashid's child.

== Cast ==
- Yoosuf Shafeeu as Nashid, Leena and Eenaz's husband
- Niuma Mohamed as Eenaz, Nashid's best friend turned 2nd wife
  - Mariyam Enash Sinan as young Eenaz
- Aishath Shiranee as Leena, Nashid's 1st wife
- Asad Shareef as Madhih, Enaz's ex-husband
- Ahmed Nabeel Mohamed as Leena's gynecologist
- Mariyam Enash Sinan as Eenas, Eenaz's sister
- Aminath Rasheedha as Zulfa, Eenaz's mother
- Abdul Raheem as Eenaz's father
- Abdul Satthar as Leena's father
- Ahmed Saeed as Niyaa
- Arifa Ibrahim as Leena's mother
- Khadheeja Ibrahim Didi (Special appearance in the song "Hee Samaasa Rattehinna")
- Ravee Farooq as Sam (Special appearance in the song "Nudhaaney Mireyge Handhaanthah")

== Soundtrack ==
Track listing
No.	Title	Lyrics	Music	Singer(s)	Length
1.	"Mivaagotheh Neyngeyey"	Mausoom Shakir	Hussain Sobah	Fathimath Zoona, Hassan Ilham	3:06
2.	"Nudhaaney Mireyge Handhaanthah"	Mausoom Shakir	Hussain Sobah	Ibrahim Rameez	3:30
3.	"Neyndhen Vakivaakah"	Mausoom Shakir	Hussain Sobah	Ibrahim Rameez, Fathimath Rauf	4:57
4.	"Hee Samaasaa Rattehinnaa"	Mausoom Shakir	Hussain Sobah	Fathimath Zoona, Mariyam Enash Sinan, Ahmed Nabeel Mohamed	5:13
5.	"Kalaayaanulaa"	Mausoom Shakir	Hussain Sobah	Fathimath Zoona	5:26
6.	"Shakuvaa"	Mausoom Shakir	Hussain Sobah	Mukhthar Adam	6:02
7.	"Nukerifa Nuhurey"	Mausoom Shakir	Hussain Sobah	Abdul Baaree, Shifa Thaufeeq	6:05
8.	"I Love You"	Mausoom Shakir	Hussain Sobah	Hassan Ilham, Shifa Thaufeeq	6:11

== Response ==
Upon release, the film received mainly positive reviews from critics. Hilath Rasheed reviewing from Haveeru Daily praised the performance by lead actors and "cleverness" of director Nahula for opening up "sexual impotency, a taboo subject for Maldivian society, for public debate and exploring the implications it has for marriage".

== Accolades ==
Year	Award	Category	Recipients	Result	Ref.
2007	1st Miadhu Crystal Award	Best Actress	Niuma Mohamed	Won	
2007	1st Miadhu Crystal Award	Best Supporting Actress	Aishath Shiranee	Won	
2007	1st Miadhu Crystal Award	Best Audio Song	"Kalaayaanulaa"	Won	
2007	4th Gaumee Film Awards	Best Film	Kalaayaanulaa	Nominated	
2007	4th Gaumee Film Awards	Best Director	Fathimath Nahula	Nominated	
2007	4th Gaumee Film Awards	Best Actor	Yoosuf Shafeeu	Nominated	
2007	4th Gaumee Film Awards	Best Actress	Niuma Mohamed	Won	
2007	4th Gaumee Film Awards	Best Supporting Actress	Aishath Shiranee	Nominated	
2007	4th Gaumee Film Awards	Best Editing	Sadha Ahmed	Won	
2007	4th Gaumee Film Awards	Best Choreography	Suneetha Ali, Ravee Farooq	Won	
