= Dharifulhu =

Maldivian television film

- Written by: Mohamed Rasheed
- Directed by: Mohamed Shareef
- Starring: Ismail Rasheed; Ali Shameel; Aminath Rasheedha; Zuleykha Abdul Latheef
- Music by: Tholal
- Country of origin: Maldives
- Original language: Dhivehi

Production
- Editors: Imad; Mujah; Aswad
- Running time: 55 minutes

Original release
- Release: March 29, 2000

Dharifulhu is a 2000 Maldivian television film directed by Mohamed Shareef. Produced and distributed by Television Maldives, the film stars Ismail Rasheed, Ali Shameel, Aminath Rasheedha and Zuleykha Abdul Latheef in pivotal roles.

== Premise ==
Due to his straightforward behavior, Saleem (Ali Shameel) is fired from his job which he lies to his wife Wafiyya (Aminath Rasheedha) as quitting the job for self-respect. When she inquires about his decision, frustrated Saleem divorces her. He takes custody of their only child, Nihan (Ismail Rasheed) and takes good care of him. He later marries his neighbor, Amira (Zuleykha Abdul Latheef) who acts like a mother-figure to Nihan until she delivers her first child. Nihan constantly being harassed by his step-mother becomes neglected by his own father, too. Meanwhile, Amira conspires against Nihan which leads into his banishment from their island.

== Cast ==
- Ismail Rasheed as Nihan
  - Ahmed Atheef as young Nihan
- Ali Shameel as Saleem
- Aminath Rasheedha as Wafiyya
- Zuleykha Abdul Latheef as Amira
- Ibrahim Shakir as Mohamed Ageel; Saleem's brother
- Chilhiya Moosa Manik as a teacher (Special appearance)
- Shameema as Ageel's wife (Special appearance)
- Ahmed Saeed as a representative (Special appearance)
- Moosa Zakariyya as a lawyer (Special appearance)
- Adam Manik
- Shahid
- Ali Nasih
- Abdullah Ziyad
- Mohamed Amir
- Anil

== See also ==
- Lists of Maldivian films
