= Shaalinee =

2000 film directed by Aslam Rasheed

- Directed by: Aslam Rasheed
- Written by: Aslam Rasheed
- Screenplay by: Ahmed Nimal
- Produced by: Aslam Rasheed
- Starring: Mariyam Nisha; Ibrahim Giyas; Mohamed Shavin; Waleedha Waleed
- Cinematography: Abdulla Jameel
- Music by: Mohamed Rashad
- Production company: Slam Studio
- Release date: 2000
- Country: Maldives
- Language: Dhivehi

Shaalinee is a 2000 Maldivian drama film written, produced and directed by Aslam Rasheed. The film stars Mariyam Nisha, Ibrahim Giyas, Mohamed Shavin and Waleedha Waleed in pivotal roles. Shooting for the film took place in Sri Lanka.

== Premise ==
Shavin (Mohamed Shavin) finds a young lady, Shaalinee (Mariyam Nisha) lying on the road unconscious, whom he takes to a clinic and takes full responsibility of her. On regaining her consciousness, Shaalinee flees from the clinic due to the financial incapability to pay the bills. She auditions for the choreographer role under Shavin's newly established firm, but upon seeing her, he instead hired as his personal secretary.

Shaalinee is introduced to Shavin's family and his mother becomes impressed with her virtuous behavior. Meanwhile, he befriends with Shah (Ibrahim Ghiyas) and upon request of Shah, Shavin confesses to Shaalinee. They decide to begin a romantic relationship while concealing their past. However, their journey moves in an unsettling route when Shah discovers that Shavin is to marry his ex-fiancé, Shaalinee.

== Cast ==
- Mariyam Nisha as Shaalinee
- Ibrahim Giyas as Shah
- Mohamed Shavin as Shavin
- Chilhiya Moosa Manik as Moosa Manik; Shah's father
- Arifa Ibrahim as Arifa; Shah's step-mother
- Waleedha Waleed as Varudha
- Fauziyya Hassan as Shavin's mother
- Ahmed Shah as Jameel
- Mohamed Afrah as Moosa
- Mariyam Rizla as Aisha

== Soundtrack ==
Track listing
| No. | Title | Lyrics | Music | Singer(s) | Length |
|---|---|---|---|---|---|
| 1. | "Noorey Udun Dhekenee" | Mariyam Waheedha | Imaadh Ismail | Massoodh Moosa Didi | 03:27 |
| 2. | "Gaathugaa Vaashey" | Mariyam Waheedha | Imaadh Ismail | Imaadh Ismail, Mariyam Waheedha | 03:13 |
| 3. | "Mi Edhey Loabi Dhee" | Mariyam Waheedha | Imaadh Ismail | Mariyam Waheedha | 03:39 |
| 4. | "Loabi Hiyy Vun Mee Thedhey" | Mariyam Waheedha | Imaadh Ismail | Imaadh Ismail, Mariyam Waheedha | 05:24 |
| 5. | "Vakivun Mihiyy" | Mariyam Waheedha | Imaadh Ismail | Abdul Hannan Moosa Didi, Mariyam Waheedha | 04:43 |
