= Dheevaanaa =

2001 Maldivian film by Aslam Rasheed

- Directed by: Aslam Rasheed
- Written by: Aslam Rasheed
- Starring: Niuma Mohamed; Mohamed Shavin; Mohamed Afrah; Waleedha Waleed
- Cinematography: Jameel; Ibrahim Moosa
- Edited by: Mohamed Amsad
- Music by: Imad Ismail
- Production company: Slam Studio
- Release date: 2001
- Country: Maldives
- Language: Dhivehi

Dheevaanaa is a 2001 Maldivian romantic thriller film directed by Aslam Rasheed. Produced under Slam Studio, the film stars Niuma Mohamed, Mohamed Shavin, Mohamed Afrah and Waleedha Waleed in pivotal roles. The film was an unofficial remake of Ram Gopal Varma's romantic thriller Pyaar Tune Kya Kiya (2001).

== Premise ==
Zain (Mohamed Shavin), a company's photographer was roaming around the island searching for the perfect click for inclusion in their upcoming magazine where he meets Lamya Anwar (Niuma Mohamed) and clicks several photos of her without her permission. The pictures caught the attention of company's manager, Farooq (Mohamed Afrah) who included her portrait in their magazine's cover photo, much to Lamya's frustration. However, Zain and Lamya later bond; going for photoshoots together and working as his professional model. Lamya starts liking him but she gets heartbroken when Lamya discovers that Zain is actually married to a girl named Reena (Waleedha Waleed).

== Cast ==
- Niuma Mohamed as Lamya Anwar
- Mohamed Shavin as Zain
- Mohamed Afrah as Farooq
- Waleedha Waleed as Reesha
- Ali Shameel as Anwar
- Habeeb as Lhabey
- Ravee Farooq (Special appearance in the song "Hiyy Masthu Ishq")

== Soundtrack ==
Track listing
No.	Title	Lyrics	Music	Singer(s)	Length
1.	"Ku Ku Ku"	Mariyam Waheedha	Imaadh Ismail	Imaadh Ismail
2.	"Hiyy Masth Ishq"	Mariyam Waheedha	Imaadh Ismail	Ahmed Amir (AIMS), Fazeela Amir
3.	"Loabiveema Vaagothey"	Mariyam Waheedha	Imaadh Ismail	Fathimath Rauf, Ahmed Falah
4.	"Veyney Mee Hithugaa Aalaavaa"	Mariyam Waheedha	Imaadh Ismail	Mariyam Unoosha
5.	"Levvi Naseebey"	Mariyam Waheedha	Imaadh Ismail	Imaadh Ismail, Fazeela Amir
