= Mi Hiyy Keekkuraanee? =

- Official film poster
- Directed by: Amjad Ibrahim
- Written by: Amjad Ibrahim
- Screenplay by: Amjad Ibrahim
- Produced by: Amjad Ibrahim
- Starring: Mohamed Manik; Sheela Najeeb; Mohamed Shavin
- Cinematography: Ali Rasheed; Shuau; Sameel; Abbas
- Edited by: Nasrulla
- Music by: Imad Ismail
- Production company: VStream Studio
- Release date: 13 January 2010
- Country: Maldives
- Language: Dhivehi

Mi Hiyy Keekkuraanee? is a 2010 Maldivian romantic horror film written, produced and directed by Amjad Ibrahim. The film stars Mohamed Manik, Sheela Najeeb and Mohamed Shavin in pivotal roles.

== Premise ==
Jennifer (Sheela Najeeb), a strange spirit in the disguise of a human being is on an avenging mission where she regularly meets three siblings; a shopkeeper, Sunil (Mohamed Manik), a taxi driver, Shahid (Mohamed Shavin) and their younger brother, Shiran (Hussain Solah). The siblings confess their feelings towards Jennifer. One night, when Shiran throws off his amulet on the order of Jennifer, he is mysteriously killed by her. However, after him being profoundly dead, Shiran is miraculously reincarnated.

== Cast ==
- Mohamed Manik as Sunil
- Sheela Najeeb as Jennifer
- Mohamed Shavin as Shahid
- Mariyam Afeefa as Aroosha
- Ahmed Asim as Asim
- Hussain Solah as Shiran
- Khadheeja Ibrahim Didi as Firasha
- Fathimath Aflaz Faisal as Laisha
- Amira Ismail as Zeesha
- Ali Firaq as Hussain (Special appearance)
- Aishath Gulfa as Latheefa (Special appearance)

== Soundtrack ==
Track listing
No.	Title	Music	Singer(s)	Length
1.	"Yaaraa Dhekey Hiyy Veyey"	Hussain Sobah	Mumthaz Moosa, Fathimath Zoona
2.	"Fun Araamekey Thibaage Loaibakee"	Hussain Sobah	Abdul Baaree, Aishath Inaya
3.	"Haadha Asaru Hithugaa Veyey"	Hussain Sobah	Fazeela Amir
4.	"Kairivelanthoa Kairi Kurey"	Hussain Sobah	Abdul Baaree, Moonisa Khaleel
5.	"Yaaraa Dhekey Hiyy Veyey" (Version 2)	Hussain Sobah	Mumthaz Moosa, Shaheedha Mohamed
