= Hifehettumeh Neiy Karuna =

- Official film poster
- Directed by: Mohamed Rasheed
- Written by: Abdulla Sodiq
- Screenplay by: Mohamed Rasheed; Hassan Najumee
- Produced by: Aslam Rasheed
- Cinematography: Abdulla Jameel
- Edited by: Mohamed Amsad
- Music by: Mohamed Amsad
- Production company: Slam Studio
- Release date: 1996
- Running time: 149 minutes
- Country: Maldives
- Language: Dhivehi

Hifehettumeh Neiy Karuna is a 1996 Maldivian drama film directed by Mohamed Rasheed. Produced by Aslam Rasheed under Slam Studio, the film stars Niuma Mohamed, Ibrahim Wisan and Arifa Ibrahim in pivotal roles.

== Premise ==
Mohamed Ali (Abdul Raheem) adopted his niece Thasneem when his wife, Shakeela (Arifa Ibrahim) promised to take her as their own child since the couple are still not blessed with a child. She grew up with love and adore until Shakeela was found to be pregnant with a child.

== Cast ==
- Niuma Mohamed as Thasneem
- Arifa Ibrahim as Shakeela
- Abdul Raheem as Mohamed Ali
- Ibrahim Wisan as Javid
- Mariyam Agisa as Baby
- Shelin as Thasneem (child)
- Enee as Thasneem (child)
- Nooma Ibrahim as Shehenaz
- Chilhiya Moosa Manik as Moosabe

== Soundtrack ==
Track listing
No.	Title	Lyrics	Singer(s)	Length
1.	"Furee Hayaathuge"	Easa Shareef	Mohamed Huzam
2.	"Iruge Alikan Fanduve"	Mariyam Waheedha	Mariyam Waheedha
3.	"Furaa Dhaathee Hingaa"		Mohamed Huzam
4.	"Naaevee Keeh Hey?"	Mariyam Waheedha	Mariyam Waheedha
5.	"Hiyy Magey Hiyy Magey Fennaanethee"	Abdulla Sodhiq	Mohamed Huzam, Mariyam Waheedha
6.	"Athulee Ey Hiyy Bunanee"	Abdulla Sodhiq	Mohamed Huzam, Mariyam Waheedha
7.	"Rovey Haalu Karunain"		Mohamed Huzam
8.	"Hiyy Vee Loabinney"	Abdulla Sodhiq	Mohamed Huzam, Mariyam Waheedha
