= Suneetha Ali =

Maldivian choreographer, actress and producer

- Born: 28 May 1977 (age 49); Aa. Ukulhas, Maldives
- Occupations: Choreographer, actress, producer
- Years active: 1994–present

Suneetha Ali (born 28 May 1977) is a Maldivian choreographer, actress and producer.

== Early life ==
Suneetha Ali was born on 28 May 1977 in Aa. Ukulhas. Her father, is a fisherman while her mother is a homemaker. Ali spent most of her childhood, in a melodramatic environment, dancing to the tunes of songs from Bollywood. After her failed marriage, Ali, at the age of fourteen, relocated to Male' where she got exposed to the stage shows and music performances. A few months later, she participated in a local talent show, Galaxy where she danced to few Bollywood songs and her performance was criticized by the audience to the point where she was "booed off the stage". However, strong-willed, Ali "polished" her act a year later she was cast as a background dance in a television series.

== Career ==
In 1994, Suneetha starred in the Mariyam Shauqee and Arifa Ibrahim-directed family drama Manzil (1994) which follows as an intelligent and hardworking orphan, whose life takes a dramatic turn while working as a servant in a reputed family. Apart from playing the role of Lubna in Amjad Ibrahim's television series, Dheben (1997), she was cast as a maid in his feature film Loabeega Aniyaa (1997) released in 1997. She next starred in Mariyam Shauqee's widely acclaimed family drama television series Kahthiri, where she played the friend of an indolent mother.

This was followed by her appearances in item songs of films including, Mila Handhuvaru (1998), Hiyy Halaaku (1998) and Hiiy Edhenee (2001). She then worked with Ibrahim for his children's horror films, Santhi Mariyanbu 1 (2001) and Safaru Kaiydha 1 (2001) where she played the titular roles in all of the installments. The following year, she collaborated with Amjad Ibrahim for his horror film Sandhuravirey (2002) which narrates the story of a female jinn aiming to win the heart of a human being. Featuring Shafeeu and Mariyam Nisha in lead roles, she played the role of a intellectually disabled young woman. Upon release, the film received poor reviews from critics.

== Personal life ==
At the age thirteen, Ali decided to marry her best-friend, to which her parents refused citing her young age. However, with the help of her neighbors and family members, she managed to convinces her parent for her marriage which lasted three months, when she filed for divorce as her husband disapproved her to play sports with boys of her age.

In June 2013, while Ali was trying hard to move on with her 8 years old romantic relationship, which she breaks up herself an year ago, for discovering her boyfriends affair, gets amused by the news of Bollywood actor, Priyanka Chopra signing a film four days later to her father's demise, showing "remarkable display of resilience". Noting the progression from the actor, Ali started "idolizing" her from following her hairstyles to makeup to wardrobe collection. Soon, she started performing tributes to Chopra by singing, dancing and producing music videos of her Hindi songs, dubbed in Dhivehi, which attracted several criticism from the locals and industry colleagues where she gets mocked by referring her as "Suniyanka". She recalls her engagement with Chopra at the music concert held in January 2015 as her "happiest day" in her life.

== Filmography ==
=== Feature film ===
Year	Title	Role	Notes	Ref(s)
1997	Hinithun	Herself	Special appearance in the song "Khiyaal Gehlunee Hey?"	
1997	Loabeege Aniyaa	Maid		
1998	Mila Handhuvaru	Herself	Special appearance in the song "Fari Mooney Thee Hoadhaalaa"	
2000	Hiyy Halaaku	Herself	Special appearance in the song "Thiya Loabi Handhaanveema"	
2001	Hiiy Edhenee	Herself	Special appearance in the song "Furusathu Libi Dhuniyeyga"	
2002	Sandhuravirey	Safa		

=== Short films ===
Year	Title	Role	Notes
2001	Santhi Mariyan'bu 1	Santhi Mariyan'bu	Children's film
2001	Safaru Kaiydha 1	Safaru Kaiydha	Children's film

=== Television ===
Year	Title	Role	Notes
1994	Manzil	Jeeza	
1994	Qurubaan	Shifa	Recurring role; 4 episodes
1997	Dheben	Lubna	
1997	Ummeedhu		
1997	Kahthiri	Suneetha	Recurring role; 20 episodes
2003	Edhuvas En'buri Annaanenama	Herself	Special appearance in the song "Hiyy Magey Kiyaadhemey"
2004	Vaisoori	Aisthu	In the segment "Ih'thiraam Hoadhavaa"
2008	Manzilakee Thee Ey Magey	Herself	Special appearance in the song "Haadha Loaiybey Heeleemaa"

=== Other work ===
Year	Title	Director	Producer	Notes
2004	Hiyy Dheewaanaa		Yes	Songs DVD; Co-produced with Shareefa Fakhry
2005	Hiyy Dheewaanaa 2		Yes	Songs DVD; Co-produced with Shareefa Fakhry
2006	Hiyy Dheewaanaa 3		Yes	Songs DVD; Co-produced with Shareefa Fakhry
2008	Hiyy Dheewaanaa 4		Yes	Songs DVD; Co-produced with Shareefa Fakhry
2010	Magey Hithakee Hitheh Noon Hey?		Yes	Drama series
2011	Hiyy Dheewaanaa 5		Yes	Songs DVD
2013	Hiyy Dheewaanaa 6		Yes	Songs DVD

== Accolades ==
Year	Award	Category	Nominated work	Result	Ref(s)
2007	4th Gaumee Film Awards	Best Choreography	Kalaayaanulaa (Shared with Ravee Farooq)	Won	
2007	1st Miadhu Crystal Award	Best Video Album	Hiyy Dheewaanaa 3	Won	
2007	1st Miadhu Crystal Award	Best Video Song	"Fathis Dhan" - Hiyy Dheewaanaa 3	Won	
2008	2nd Miadhu Crystal Award	Best Audio Album	Hiyy Dheewaanaa 4	Won	
2008	2nd Miadhu Crystal Award	Best Video Song	"Crazy Khiyaaley" - Hiyy Dheewaanaa 4	Won	
2008	2nd Miadhu Crystal Award	Best Choreography	"Crazy Khiyaaley" - Hiyy Dheewaanaa 4	Won	
2021	ASIA Awards 2020/2021	Asia's Outstanding Woman Achiever Award		Won	
2021	Women Icon Award 2021	Outstanding Women Award		Won	
