= Nufolhey Maa =

- Official film poster
- Directed by: Mohamed Musthafa Hussain
- Written by: Chilhiya Moosa Manik
- Screenplay by: Chilhiya Moosa Manik; Mohamed Musthafa Hussain
- Produced by: Mohamed Musthafa Hussain
- Starring: Hassan Afeef; Asima; Ibrahim Rasheed
- Cinematography: Adam Shareef
- Release date: 1989
- Country: Maldives
- Language: Dhivehi

Nufolhey Maa (transl. Unbloomed Flower) is a 1989 Maldivian drama film produced and directed by Mohamed Musthafa Hussain. The film stars Hassan Afeef, Asima, Ibrahim Rasheed in pivotal roles. The film focuses on a love triangle between a doctor, nurse and patient.

== Premise ==
Ibrahim Manik (Chilhiya Moosa Manik) and his wife, Shareefa (Fathimath Didi), arrange their daughter, Athifa's (Asima) marriage with their friend's son, Dr. Athif (Ibrahim Rasheed) who works in the same hospital with Athifa. However, things go sideways when Athifa starts spending more time with a patient, Shiyam (Hassan Afeef) who is instantly attracted to her.

== Cast ==
- Hassan Afeef as Shiyam
- Asima as Athifa
- Ibrahim Rasheed as Dr. Athif
- Moosa Sameer as Dhonthu
- Shaukath Ibrahim Didi as Moosafulhu
- Fathimath Didi as Shareefa
- Shakir
- Suneetha
- Mariyam Manike
- Haaroon
- Chilhiya Moosa Manik as Ibrahim Manik

== Soundtrack ==
Track listing
No.	Title	Lyrics	Singer(s)	Length
1.	"Thunfathaa Loabi Thaazaa"	Chilhiya Moosa Manik	Ibrahim Shakeeb
2.	"Hiyy Mi Dhenee"	Chilhiya Moosa Manik	Imaadh Ismail, Shafeeqa Abdul Latheef
3.	"Uthureythee Kiyaadhey Mee Bayaaney"	Chilhiya Moosa Manik	Abdul Hannan Moosa Didi, Fathimath Rauf
4.	"Khiyaal Oyaadhaa"	Chilhiya Moosa Manik	Imaadh Ismail, Shafeeqa Abdul Latheef
5.	"Ma Mi Dheevaana Veemaahey Adhu"	Chilhiya Moosa Manik	Imaadh Ismail, Shafeeqa Abdul Latheef
