= Sababu =

Sabab
- Official film poster
- Directed by: Ahmed Nimal
- Screenplay by: Ahmed Nimal
- Produced by: Aslam Rasheed
- Starring: Ibrahim Giyas; Aishath Shiranee; Ahmed Nimal
- Cinematography: Ibrahim Wisan
- Edited by: Ahmed Nimal
- Music by: Imad Ismail
- Production company: Slam Studio
- Release date: 1999
- Country: Maldives
- Language: Dhivehi

Sababu (transl. Reason) is a 1999 Maldivian drama film directed by Ahmed Nimal. Produced by Aslam Rasheed under Slam Studio, the film stars Ibrahim Giyas, Aishath Shiranee and Ahmed Nimal in pivotal roles.

== Premise ==
Azim (Ibrahim Giyas) is hired to work as a supervisor in a factory managed by Liusha (Aishath Shiranee). She meets a strange man, Niyaz (Ahmed Nimal) who is smitten by her beauty. One day, he saves Liusha from being sexually abused by her classmate, Mohamed (Mohamed Afrah) though she blamed the whole incident on Niyaz. Later, they reconcile and start a romantic relationship. Complications arise when Azim confesseds his affection towards Liusha and Niyaz decides to sacrifice his love for the sake of his friend's happiness.

== Cast ==
- Ibrahim Giyas as Azim
- Aishath Shiranee as Liusha
- Ahmed Nimal as Niyaz
- Mariyam Rizla as Mary
- Hamid Wajeeh
- Ajwad Waheed as Aadan
- Mohamed Afrah as Mohamed
- Hassan Shafeeq

== Soundtrack ==
Track listing
| No. | Title | Lyrics | Singer(s) | Length |
|---|---|---|---|---|
| 1. | "Hithah Loabi Vevuneema" | Mariyam Waheedha | Mariyam Waheedha, Mohamed Rashad |
| 2. | "Mi Qudhurathee Manaazirah" | Mariyam Waheedha | Mariyam Waheedha, Mohamed Rashad |
| 3. | "Vaagotheh Neyngeyey" | Mariyam Waheedha | Mariyam Waheedha |
| 4. | "Loabi Gellumun" | Mariyam Waheedha | Mohamed Rashad |
