= Ihsaas =

- Directed by: Mohamed Hilmy; Ali Waheed
- Written by: Mohamed Hilmy
- Screenplay by: Mohamed Hilmy
- Produced by: MAPA
- Starring: Ismail Wajeeh; Reeko Moosa Manik; Hamid Wajeeh; Aminath Shiyaza; Ameena; Yadhiya Hilmy
- Cinematography: Ali Waheed
- Edited by: Ali Waheed
- Music by: I.D.
- Release date: 1993
- Country: Maldives
- Language: Dhivehi

Ihsaas is a 1993 Maldivian drama film directed by Mohamed Hilmy and Ali Waheed. Produced by MAPA, the film stars Ismail Wajeeh, Reeko Moosa Manik, Hamid Wajeeh, Aminath Shiyaza, Ameena and Yadhiya Hilmy in pivotal roles.

== Premise ==
Mohamed Unaiz (Ismail Wajeeh), an orphan who lost his family in a shipwreck, migrates to a foreign country for further studies and is arrested by a group of assassins for his alleged involvement in spying. With the help of Maldivian government, Unaiz is released from the jail and relocates to his island where he marries a divorcee, Shareefa, who domestically abuses him.

== Cast ==
- Ismail Wajeeh as Mohamed Unaiz
- Reeko Moosa Manik as Nasheed
- Hamid Wajeeh
- Aminath Shiyaza as Dr. Shan
- Ameena
- Yadhya Hilmy
- Ibrahim Shakir as a doctor
- Koyya Hassan Manik as Aadhanu

== Soundtrack ==
Track listing
No.	Title	Lyrics	Music	Singer(s)	Length
1.	"Thee Ey Magey Dheyhugaa Vaa Ufaa"	Aminath Faiza	Mohamed Hilmy	Mohamed Shahuban, Naki
2.	"Mi Gulhun Zavaajah Hadhaanan"	Aminath Faiza		Mohamed Shahuban, Salma Ibrahim
3.	"Vairoalhi"	Aminath Faiza	Mohamed Hilmy	Imaadh Ismail, Salma Ibrahim
4.	"Ikhlaas Hithun Heyo Edheynan"	Aminath Faiza		Salma Ibrahim
5.	"Hoadhamun Hama Hoadhamun"	Aminath Faiza		Mohamed Shahuban, Salma Ibrahim
6.	"Rahumaiytherikan Mihen"	Aminath Faiza		Mohamed Shahuban

== Accolades ==
Year	Award	Category	Recipients	Result
1995	1st Gaumee Film Awards	Best Actor	Ismail Wajeeh	Won
1995	1st Gaumee Film Awards	Best Supporting Actor	Reeko Moosa Manik	Won
1995	1st Gaumee Film Awards	Best Makeup	Ismail Wajeeh, Mohamed Hilmy	Won
