= Fun Asaru =

- Official film poster
- Directed by: Amila Adam; Emaz Abdul Shukoor; Aishath Leela
- Written by: Fathimath Nahula
- Screenplay by: Fathimath Nahula
- Produced by: Television Maldives
- Starring: Aishath Shiranee; Hussain Sobah; Ibrahim Rasheed; Hawwa Riyaza
- Cinematography: Ahmed Azim; Mohamed Manik; Mohamed Shiyaz
- Edited by: Ali Musthafa
- Music by: Monas
- Release date: 1996
- Country: Maldives
- Language: Dhivehi

Fun Asaru is a 1996 Maldivian drama film directed by Amila Adam, Emaz Abdul Shukoor and Aishath Leela. Produced by Television Maldives, the film stars Aishath Shiranee, Hussain Sobah, Ibrahim Rasheed and Hawwa Riyaza in pivotal roles.

== Premise ==
Hana (Aishath Shiranee), is the only child in a wealthy family who falls in love with the servant working in the house, Sobah (Hussain Sobah). Their brief affair was exposed to her uncle (Ali Shameel) who outrageously throws Sobah out of their house. Sobah gets a chance to perform with a music band and becomes a notable musician. Hana and Sobah secretly continues their relationship. Despite her family's disapproval, Hana marries Sobah promising she will never return to them. Six years later, Hana, now happily married to Sobah and blessed with a child (Shelee) is diagnosed with cancer.

== Cast ==
- Aishath Shiranee as Hana
- Hussain Sobah as Sobah
- Ibrahim Rasheed as Fazeel
- Hawwa Riyaza as Lizy
- Mariyam Sheleen as Sheleen; Hana's daughter
- Ali Shameel as Hana's uncle
- Arifa Ibrahim as Hana's mother
- Aiminaidhee as Mariyamdhee
- Chilhiya Moosa Manik as Saleem; Lizy's father
- Ibrahim Shakir
- Roanu Hassan Manik as Thakurufaan

== Soundtrack ==
Track listing
No.	Title	Lyrics	Singer(s)	Length
1.	"Aavedhaamee"	Fathimath Nahula	Muaviyath Anwar
2.	"Neyngi Hithey Gendheveema"	Easa Shareef	Ali Rameez, Shifa Thaufeeq
3.	"Loabi Mummy Bunan"	Fathimath Nahula	Fathimath Iradha, Fathimath Zoona
4.	"Miljulvey Loabi Neyngunuthaa Ey"	Ahmed Sharumeel	Asim Thaufeeq, Shifa Thaufeeq
5.	"Ufaa Dhin Jaadhuvee Reyrey"	Fathimath Nahula	Muaviyath Anwar
6.	"Ufaa Dhin Jaadhuvee Reyrey" (Sad version)	Fathimath Nahula	Muaviyath Anwar, Shifa Thaufeeq
