= Nuruhunvi Loabi =

- Official film poster
- Directed by: Ahmed Ibrahim
- Written by: Mohamed Abdul Hakeem
- Screenplay by: Mohamed Abdul Hakeem
- Produced by: Hussain Rasheed
- Starring: Mohamed Abdul Hakeem; Thooba Ahmed; Abdul Salaam Abdul Hakeem
- Cinematography: Ahmed Ibrahim; Ali Abdul Hakeem
- Edited by: Mohamed Abdul Hakeem
- Production company: Farivaa Films
- Release date: December 1, 1999
- Country: Maldives
- Language: Dhivehi

Nuruhunvi Loabi is a 1999 Maldivian drama film directed by Ahmed Ibrahim. Produced by Hussain Rasheed under Farivaa Films, the film stars Mohamed Abdul Hakeem, Thooba Ahmed and Abdul Salaam Abdul Hakeem in pivotal roles. The film was released on 1 December 1999.

== Cast ==
- Mohamed Abdul Hakeem
- Thooba Ahmed
- Abdul Salaam Abdul Hakeem
- Maimoona Yoosuf
- Mohamed Malik
- Waheedha Yoosuf
- Ahmed Ibrahim
- Fazeena Ahmed
- Hassan Afeef as Afeef

== Soundtrack ==
Track listing
No.	Title	Lyrics	Singer(s)	Length
1.	"Dhenhey Seedha Saaf Javaab"	Ahmed Sharumeel	Mohamed Rashad, Zahiyya Thaufeeq
2.	"Dheyneythaaey"	Ahmed Sharumeel	Zahiyya Thaufeeq
3.	"Hendhunaa"	Ahmed Sharumeel	Sofa Thaufeeq
4.	"Fari Moonaa"	Hussain Sobah	Hussain Sobah
5.	"Hithugaa Andhan Feshi Loabi"	Ahmed Sharumeel	Mohamed Rashad, Zahiyya Thaufeeq
