= Aisha (TV series) =

Maldivian TV series

- Genre: Romantic drama
- Written by: Abdul Faththaah
- Screenplay by: Abdul Faththaah
- Directed by: Abdul Faththaah; Mohamed Rasheed
- Starring: Jamsheedha Ahmed; Ibrahim Hilmy; Arifa Ibrahim; Niuma Mohamed; Aminath Rasheedha
- No. of seasons: 1
- No. of episodes: 10

Production
- Cinematography: Mohamed Rasheed
- Editor: Hassan Nishath
- Running time: 28-41 minutes

Original release
- Network: Television Maldives
- Release: 24 December 1998 – 29 March 1999

Aisha is a Maldivian romantic drama television series developed for Television Maldives by Abdul Faththaah. The series stars Jamsheedha Ahmed, Ibrahim Hilmy, Arifa Ibrahim, Niuma Mohamed and Aminath Rasheedha in pivotal roles.

== Premise ==
Aisha is forced to drop out from school and start working at a family-friend's guest house to earn an income needed to recover from their financial debt. She continues a strenuous life with work while dealing with her abusive mother, Ameena (Arifa Ibrahim). While she is working at Azima's (Aminath Rasheedha) guest-house, Aisha meets Shamaal (Ibrahim Hilmy) an adoptive child of Azima whom she likes instantly. Azima approves their relationship though the couple decide not to share the news with Ameena considering the family crisis she deals with. However, Ameena discovers their affair and storms off to Azima while forbidding Aisha from working at the guesthouse. After several negotiations Ameena bless the couple and they marry. Few months past their marriage, Aisha and Shamaal is blessed with a child though he becomes quite abusive to Aisha while calling her a "misfortune" to him.

== Cast ==
=== Main ===
- Jamsheedha Ahmed as Aisha
- Ibrahim Hilmy as Shamaal
- Arifa Ibrahim as Ameena
- Niuma Mohamed as Shaama
- Aminath Rasheedha as Azima
- Asad Shareef as Aanim
- Waleedha Waleed as Nahidha
- Ali Shameel as Naseem

=== Recurring ===
- Ahmed as Ziyad
- Mariyam Sheleen as Sama
- Mariyam Nisha as Neena; Naseem's first wife
- Mariyam Haleem as Faathuma; Shaama's mother
- Khadheeja Mohamed as Mary
- Ahmed Saeed as Jina's brother
- Koyya Hassan Manik as Naseem's Father

=== Guest ===
- Ahmed Shimau as Aanim's friend
- Chilhiya Moosa Manik as a doctor

== Soundtrack ==
Track listing
No.	Title	Lyrics	Music	Singer(s)	Length
1.	"Loabi Aisha"	Jaufar Abdul Rahman		Abdul Sameeu	3:59
2.	"Thuhthu Amaanaiy"	Jaufar Abdul Rahman	Hussain Sobah	Mukhthar Adam, Fathimath Rauf

== Response ==
The series mainly received positive reviews from critics and viewers. Ahmed Adhushan from Mihaaru choose the series among the "Top 5 best series directed by Faththaah". Sajid Abdulla reviewing from MuniAvas selected the series in the "Top 10 best television series of all time" and praised the performance of leading actors along with the title song for holding a "repeating value".
