= Umurah =

- Directed by: Ali Musthafa
- Written by: Fathimath Nahula
- Screenplay by: Ali Musthafa
- Produced by: Hassan Ali; Ahmed Sharan Ali
- Starring: Reeko Moosa Manik; Hussain Sobah; Jamsheedha Ahmed; Zeenath Abbas
- Cinematography: Azim
- Edited by: Ali Musthafa
- Music by: Hussain Sobah; Imad Ismail
- Production company: Dash Studio
- Release date: 13 November 1999
- Country: Maldives
- Language: Dhivehi

Umurah is a 1999 Maldivian drama film directed by Ali Musthafa. Produced by Hassan Ali and Ahmed Sharan Ali under Dash Studio, the film stars Reeko Moosa Manik, Hussain Sobah, Jamsheedha Ahmed and Zeenath Abbas in pivotal roles.

== Premise ==
Dr. Riyaz (Reeko Moosa Manik) often wakes up to a vivid dream and decides to take a break from work. He proposes to a heartbroken Jamsheedha (Jamsheedha Ahmed) who refuses to extend their relationship beyond friendship since she is deeply in love with someone else. Slightly convinced by her nurse friend, Raheema (Zeenath Abbas) and concerned about the condition of Riyaz's mother, Zulfa (Aminath Rasheedha), a heart patient, Jamsheedha reluctantly accepts Riyaz's marriage proposal. As she marries, she finds herself to be two months pregnant from an extra-marital affair she previously had with Niman (Hussain Sobah) who dies in the hands of Dr. Riyaz due to his negligence.

== Cast ==
- Reeko Moosa Manik as Dr. Riyaz
- Hussain Sobah as Niman
- Jamsheedha Ahmed as Jamsheedha
- Zeenath Abbas as Raheema
- Koyya Hassan Manik as Hameed
- Satthar Ibrahim Manik
- Aminath Rasheedha as Zulfa
- Fauziyya Hassan as Niman's mother
- Ihusana
- Ibrahim Ahmed

== Soundtrack ==
Track listing
No.	Title	Lyrics	Singer(s)	Length
1.	"Hiyy Ruhey Hiyy Edhey"	Mausoom Shakir	Asim Thaufeeq, Sofa Thaufeeq
2.	"Hiyy Edhey Araamuvee"	Adam Naseer Ibrahim	Ali Rameez, Fathimath Zoona
3.	"Abadhu Abadhume Gislaa"	Boi Ahmed Khaleel	Mukhthar Adam
4.	"Ey Loabi Dheyshey"	Adam Haleem Adnan	Ali Rameez, Rafiyath Rameeza
5.	"Umurunve Maazee Qaruneh Dhiyas"	Adam Haleem Adnan	Ali Rameez, Rafiyath Rameeza
6.	"Ei Reethivi Iru Handhuthaaey"	Boi Ahmed Khaleel	Abdul Baaree, Fathimath Zoona
