= Kahthiri =

Maldivian television series

- Official film poster
- Written by: Fathimath Nahula; Mohamed Waheed; Chilhiya Moosa Manik
- Directed by: Mariyam Shaugee
- Music by: Mohamed Zaid
- Country of origin: Maldives
- Original language: Dhivehi
- No. of seasons: 1
- No. of episodes: 78

Production
- Producers: UNFPA; Television Maldives
- Cinematography: Mohamed Manik; Mohamed Shiyaz; Mohamed Rasheed; Hussain Rasheed; Ahmed Azim; Ahmed Athoof; Ali Niman; Adheel
- Editor: Moosa Haleem
- Running time: 20-39 minutes

Original release
- Release: 12 November 1997 – 5 May 1999

Kahthiri is a Maldivian television series developed for Television Maldives by Mariyam Shaugee. Produced by Television Maldives in collaboration with UNFPA, the series stars Arifa Ibrahim, Ibrahim Shakir, Ali Shameel, Hassan Afeef, Ahmed Giyas, Aishath Shiranee, Niuma Mohamed, Aminath Rasheedha, Neena Saleem, Ismail Wajeeh and Reeko Moosa Manik in pivotal roles.

== Premise ==
The series highlights several social issues arising including inadequate housing, absence of birth control measures, improper medical treatments, lack of family planning within a large family living in a congested housing complex.

Adam Manik (Ibrahim Shakir) and Hawwa Manike (Arifa Ibrahim) have seven children; a taxi driver, Mausoom (Ali Shameel), a mechanical engineer, Azmee (Hassan Afeef), a retailer, Saamee (Ahmed Giyas), a TV presenter, Rashfa (Aishath Shiranee), a student pursued to be a doctor, Shiyana (Niuma Mohamed), a spoiled son, Ihusan (Hamdhoon) and Shifa (Aminath Sheleen). Mausoom is married to the righteous woman, Aminath (Aminath Rasheedha) who is the only daughter-in-law in the family with a superior upbringing, while Azmee's wife, Jeeza (Neena Saleem) and Saamee's wife, Farasha (Shahudha) are two indolent women who prefers to live independent from the family. Mausoom and Adam Manike advise them to sneak away from the clutches of their nasty wives. Aminath gives birth to a child who often gets sick and is later diagnosed to be a Thalassemia patient.

The over protected daughters, Rashfa and Shiyana, secretly start dating a shopkeeper, Umar (Ismail Wajeeh) and a wealthy entrepreneur, Kamil (Reeko Moosa Manik). Unable to tolerate the harshness of Farasha, Saamee divorces her and marries Mariyam. This is followed by additional inconveniences in the family with discrimination against Umar and Jeeza giving birth to a child suffering from a health disorder due to the non-prescribed use of pharmaceutical drugs.

== Cast ==
=== Main ===
- Arifa Ibrahim as Hawwa Manike
- Ibrahim Shakir as Adamfulhu
- Ali Shameel as Mausoom
- Hassan Afeef as Azmee
- Ahmed Giyas as Saamee
- Aishath Shiranee as Aishath Rashfa
- Niuma Mohamed as Shiyana
- Aminath Rasheedha as Aminath
- Neena Saleem as Jeeza
- Ismail Wajeeh as Umar
- Reeko Moosa Manik as Kamil
- Zeenath Abbas as Shifa
- Mariyam Sheleen as Young Shifa
- Mariyam Rizula as Mariyam

=== Recurring ===
- Mariyam Nazima as Areesha; Azmee's second wife
- Shahudha as Farasha; Saamee's first wife
- Suneetha Ali as Suneetha; a choreographer and a friend of Jeeza
- Sithi Fulhu as Faathuma; an old woman who loves spreading gossips
- Hamdhoon as Ihusan; youngest son of the family
- Muaz as Ibrahim; Shifa's drug-addict boyfriend
- Chilhiya Moosa Manik as Ahmed Manik; a friend of Hawwa Manike
- Aminath Shareef as Jeeza's sister

=== Guest ===
- Ibrahim Rasheed as a song director (Episode 9)
- Moosa Zakariyya as Usman; Umar's manager (Episode 6 and 7)
- Aminath Ibrahim Didi as Shareefa; Hawwa Manike's neighbor (Episode 18)

== Reception ==
The series received positive reviews from critics and viewers. Ahmed Adhushan from Mihaaru choose the series among the best Maldivian television series, praising the script of the film for incorporating several issues and blending them with ease into narration. Saajidh Abdulla reviewing from MuniAvas selected the series in the "Top 10 best television series of all time" and wrote: "The series will remain one of the best production in television industry, where several renowned faces were put in one frame, conveying and emphasising the importance of several social issues that had been overlooked in the early 90s".

== Soundtrack ==
Track listing
No.	Title	Lyrics	Singer(s)	Length
1.	"Mee Himeyn Dhanvaru"	Easa Shareef	Shifa Thaufeeq, Abdul Hannan Moosa Didi	5:14
2.	"Mendhanve Himeyn Veema"	Ahmed Sharumeel	Abdul Hannan Moosa Didi	5:51
3.	"Birun Hureemaa"		Fathimath Zoona	5:57
4.	"Love Hama Love"		Rafiyath Rameeza, Muaviyath Anwar	5:52
5.	"Libey Fun Asaru Hey"			4:42
6.	"Haalaa Medhugaa Visnaaleema"			5:03
