= Hinithun =

1997 film directed by Amjad Ibrahim

- Directed by: Amjad Ibrahim
- Written by: Fathimath Nahula
- Screenplay by: Amjad Ibrahim
- Produced by: Villager Maldives
- Starring: Ismail Hilmy; Jamsheedha Ahmed
- Cinematography: Ali Rasheed
- Edited by: Ahmed Shaniz; Ali Rasheed; Hussain Adil
- Music by: Monas
- Release date: 1997
- Running time: 197 minutes
- Country: Maldives
- Language: Dhivehi

Hinithun is a 1997 Maldivian drama film directed by Amjad Ibrahim. Produced by Villager Maldives, the film stars Ismail Hilmy and Jamsheedha Ahmed in pivotal roles.

== Premise ==
During the labor to her only child, Waseema (Aminadidi) was advised to avoid further pregnancy considering her health condition. In a trip to an island, the couple adopts an underprivilege boy, Shamin (Ismail Hilmy) who grows up with love and fortune with their daughter, Areesha (Jamsheedha Ahmed). Years later, Areesha was diagnosed as a heart patient which led the parents to slowly ignore Shamin and become solely focused on Areesha. Citing their financial incapability, the family requests Shamin to leave them and relocate to another house. Areesha, having no connection with Shamin, starts dating his best friend, Shiham while Shamin is seem to be in love with Areesha.

== Cast ==
- Ismail Hilmy as Shamin
- Jamsheedha Ahmed as Areesha
- Hussain Mahir as Shiham
- Mariyam Rizla
  - Mariyam Nisha (Voice-over for the character Neema)
- Aminadidi as Waseema
- Shahzaadha
- Zulfiqar
- Hussain Rushdee
- Aminath Rushdee
- Mariyam Rushdee
- Sameema
- Suneetha Ali (Special appearance in the song "Khiyaal Gehlunee Hey?")

== Soundtrack ==
Track listing
| No. | Title | Lyrics | Singer(s) | Length |
|---|---|---|---|---|
| 1. | "Adhu Netheethoa Ehee Asthaa" | Ibrahim Mansoor | Mohamed Huzam |
| 2. | "Meri Loa Ekee Nimeyney" | Shakeel | Mohamed Huzam |
| 3. | "Edheveythee Adhu Hurevey" | Ahmed Sharumeel | Ali Rameez, Fazeela Amir |
| 4. | "Veybaa E Libi Naseebugaa" | Ahmed Sharumeel | Mariyam Shiham |
