= Kulunu =

- Official film poster
- Directed by: Ali Waheed
- Written by: Ali Waheed
- Screenplay by: Ali Waheed
- Produced by: Mapa
- Starring: Aminath Muneera; Ismail Wajeeh; Aishath Shiranee
- Cinematography: Ali Waheed
- Edited by: Ibrahim Rafeeu
- Music by: I.D.
- Production company: Mapa Films
- Release date: 1994
- Country: Maldives
- Language: Dhivehi

Kulunu (transl. Affection) is a 1994 Maldivian drama film written and directed by Ali Waheed. Produced by Mapa, the film stars Aminath Muneera, Ismail Wajeeh and Aishath Shiranee in pivotal roles.

== Synopsis ==
Rashid (Ismail Wajeed), a hardworking doctor goes to Addu upon the request of the government where he meets a dedicated nurse, Reema (Aminath Muneera) who spends all her time serving her ill mother. When her mother passes away, Rashid personally takes care of Reema and a romantic relationship begins between them. The couple plan their marriage while his family arranges his marriage with his childhood friend, Nasheedha (Aishath Shiranee).

== Cast ==
- Aminath Muneera as Reema
- Ismail Wajeeh as Rashid
- Aishath Shiranee as Nasheedha
- Koyya Hassan Manik as Hassan

== Soundtrack ==
Track listing
No.	Title	Singer(s)	Length
1.	"Lhafuraige Gulhumey"	Muaviyath Anwar, Fathimath Fiureen
2.	"Ruhuma Kulunaa Dhen Dheebala"	Muaviyath Anwar, Rafiyath Rameeza
3.	"Libeymee Sazaatho"	Muaviyath Anwar

== Accolades ==
Year	Award	Category	Recipients	Result
1995	1st Gaumee Film Awards	Best Supporting Actress	Aishath Shiranee	Won
