= Zakham (1994 film) =

1994 Maldivian film

- Official film poster
- Directed by: Easa Shareef
- Written by: Chilhiya Moosa Manik
- Produced by: Aslam Rasheed
- Starring: Hassan Afeef; Aishath Shiranee
- Cinematography: Hassan Latheef; Easa Shareef
- Edited by: Easa Shareef
- Production company: Slam Studio
- Release date: 1994
- Running time: 158 minutes
- Country: Maldives
- Language: Dhivehi

Zakham is a 1994 Maldivian film directed by Easa Shareef. Produced by Aslam Rasheed under Slam Studio, the film stars Hassan Afeef and Aishath Shiranee in lead roles.

== Premise ==
Nadhiya (Aishath Shiranee) along with her family goes to a nearby uninhabited island for picnic, where she meets Asif (Hassan Afeef). She encounters a bitterful interaction with him and is loathed by his presence until he saves her from a group of thugs. This softens her hatred towards him though the tables were changed where Asif suspects her change of intention as a part of her revenge plan. The trip ends when they both reunite and starts longing for each other. Shortly after, they start dating though their happiness is short-lived as her father, Moosafulhu (Chilhiya Moosa Manik) is coerced by his business partner, Ibrahimfulhu (Ibrahim Shakir) to arrange their children's marriage in order to strengthen their friendship.

Moosafulhu announces his disapproval towards their relationship as he considers Asif to be raised in a more wealthier family and accuses all his heroic moments to be his masterplan to win Nadhiya's heart. He further blames the death of his wife on Asif's father, Hussain Manik, the manager of Ibrahimfulhu, as he refused to financially help Moosafulhu when his wife was on the verge of dying in childbirth. Moosafulhu forces her to marry Ibrahimfulhu's son, Jameel, who is later revealed to be the leader of the thugs who initially once tried to rape Nadhiya.

== Cast ==
- Hassan Afeef as Asif
- Aishath Shiranee as Nadhiya
- Chilhiya Moosa Manik as Moosafulhu; Nadhiya's father
- Easa Shareef as Nadheem; Nadhiya's brother
- Hassan Latheef
- Arifa Ibrahim as Shareefa; the wife of a wealthy businessman and Asif's mother
- Riyaz
- Fathimath Mufliha as Azeeza; the maid working at Nadhiya's house
- Hussain Shibau
- Mohamed Aboobakuru as Jameel
- Ibrahim Shakir as Ibrahimfulhu; business partner of Moosafulhu and Jameel's father
- Aminath Ahmed Didi as Nadhiya's mother who dies in childbirth

== Soundtrack ==
Track listing
No.	Title	Lyrics	Singer(s)	Length
1.	"Nunetheyne Asaru Mihithun"	Abdul Hannan Moosa Didi	Abdul Hannan Moosa Didi
2.	"Nan Adhu Mihithugaa Thi Noonee Nuvey"	Mariyam Waheedha	Abdul Hannan Moosa Didi, Mariyam Waheedha
3.	"Khiyaalugaa Hissaavelaa"	Mariyam Waheedha	Abdul Hannan Moosa Didi, Mariyam Waheedha
4.	"Thi Dhulun Nubune Khiyaalu Kuraneehey"	Mariyam Waheedha	Abdul Hannan Moosa Didi, Mariyam Waheedha
5.	"Thuraa Veynun"	Mariyam Waheedha	Abdul Hannan Moosa Didi

== Response ==
Upon release, the film received critical and commercial success where the story and its narrations by Chilhiya Moosa Manik were particularly praised by the critics. During the time of its release, most of its songs become chartbusters.

== Accolades ==
Year	Award	Category	Recipients	Result	Ref(s)
1996	Aafathis Awards – 1995	Best Actress	Aishath Shiranee	Won	
1996	Aafathis Awards – 1995	Best Story	Chilhiya Moosa Manik	Won	
1996	Aafathis Awards – 1995	Best Dialogue	Chilhiya Moosa Manik	Won	
