= Heelaiy =

- Official film poster
- Directed by: Ahmed Mohamed Didi
- Screenplay by: Aminath Hussain
- Produced by: Aslam Rasheed
- Cinematography: Ibrahim Moosa; Abdulla Jameel
- Edited by: Ahmed Mohamed Didi
- Music by: Imad Ismail
- Production company: Slam Studio
- Release date: 1997
- Country: Maldives
- Language: Dhivehi

Heelaiy is a 1997 Maldivian crime thriller film directed by Ahmed Mohamed Didi. Produced by Aslam Rasheed under Slam Studio, the film stars Reeko Moosa Manik and Aishath Shiranee in lead roles. It is an unofficial remake of Abbas–Mustan's Bollywood film Baazigar (1993) starring Shah Rukh Khan, Kajol and Dalip Tahil in the pivotal roles which was loosely based on Ira Levin's 1953 novel A Kiss Before Dying and its 1991 film adaptation of the same name.

== Premise ==
Shah Naseer (Reeko Moosa Manik) is an intellectual young man determined to avenge his father's death caused by Afeef (Mohamed Waheed), a wealthy businessman. Shah begins a romantic relationship with Afeef's eldest daughter, Aishath Naazleen (Aishath Shiranee). She decides to marry him on the sly since she is terrified of her father's anger. Soon after, she is mysteriously murdered by Shah and her death becomes ruled as a suicide. Shah meets Naazleen's twin sister, Naazneen (Aishath Shiranee) who disregards police report of her sister's suicide and tries on her own to trace the murderer. It is later discovered that Naazleen's friend, Jameela and her secret lover, Amir, own up to Naazleen's death and commit suicide. Convinced that her sister's murderer is no more, Naazneen moves ahead with her life with Shah only to find out that Naazleen's killer is alive.

== Cast ==
- Reeko Moosa Manik as Shah Naseer
- Aishath Shiranee as Aishath Naazleen / Naazneen
- Mohamed Waheed
- Dhon Annaaru Rasheed
- Chilhiya Moosa Manik as Thuhthu Seedhi
- Mohamed Riyaz
- Arifa Ibrahim as Hawwa Mohamed
- Ali Shameel as Adhil
- Ibrahim Wisan as young Shah Naseer
- Fauziyya Ahmed
- Ibrahim Waheed as police inspector
- Samandhar Iburey
- Adam Naseer
- Abdul Rahman
- Ismail Wajeeh as TV anchor (special appearance)

== Soundtrack ==
Track listing
No.	Title	Lyrics	Singer(s)	Length
1.	"Aadhey Magey Jaan"	Mariyam Waheedha	Umar Zahir, Mariyam Waheedha
2.	"Fasdhee Nudhey"	Ahmed Mohamed Didi	Ahmed Mohamed Didi
3.	"Kiyaafaa Vedhaaney"	Kaneeru Abdul Raheem	Umar Zahir, Mariyam Waheedha
4.	"Ey Aadhey Aadhey Dhekilan"	Kaneeru Abdul Raheem	Imaad Ismail
5.	"Balaanee Heekuraaneehey"	Kaneeru Abdul Raheem	Muaviyath Anwar
6.	"Vaanee Ahaa"	Abdul Muhaimin	Umar Zahir, Fazeela Amir
7.	"Dhekeysha Vanee Enmen"	Kaneeru Abdul Raheem	Muaviyath Anwar

== Response ==
Upon release, the film received positive response from the critics and audience. In an article published by Ahmed Adhushan of Mihaaru, he wrote: "an exact replica of its original, the film tried to incorporate almost all the elements of Baazigar except the fact that Shirani played the dual roles performed by Kajol and Shilpa Shetty.

== Accolades ==
Year	Award	Category	Recipients	Result	Ref(s)
1998	Aafathis Awards - 1997	Best Dance	Aishath Shiranee	Won	
