= Laila (1997 film) =

- Directed by: Abdulla Sujau
- Written by: Fathimath Nahula
- Screenplay by: Abdulla Sujau; Fathimath Nahula
- Produced by: Aafathis
- Starring: Aishath Shiranee; Moosa Zakariyya; Aishath Zeeniya; Ali Shameel; Ahmed Shimau
- Cinematography: Abdulla Sujau
- Edited by: Abdulla Sujau
- Music by: Nafil
- Production company: Corona Arts
- Release date: July 15, 1997
- Country: Maldives
- Language: Dhivehi

Laila is a 1997 Maldivian drama film edited and directed by Abdulla Sujau. Produced by Aafathis, the film stars Aishath Shiranee, Moosa Zakariyya, Aishath Zeeniya, Ali Shameel and Mariyam Haleem in pivotal roles.

== Premise ==
Laila, an attractive blind girl and the only child of a family, desires to meet her mother, Waheedha (Mariyam Haleem) who has been divorced during her childhood. Mueed (Moosa Zakariyya), a new recruit working at her father, Faiz's (Ali Shameel) office, visits her home upon Faiz's request and is instantly attracted to Laila. Their friendship grows into romance and complications arise when Laila's best-friend, Zeena, realizes her crush, Ahmed, is the same man posing with a different name, whom Laila is romantically linked up with.

== Cast ==
- Aishath Shiranee as Laila
- Moosa Zakariyya as Ahmed Mueed / Moosa
- Aishath Zeeniya as Zeena
- Ali Shameel as Faiz
- Ahmed Shimau as Nisham
- Fathimath Neena as Shahula
- Mariyam Haleem as Waheedha
- Zaneena Abdul Hakeem
- Fathuma Didi
- Aiminaidhee as Zeena's sister
- Aishath Hanim

== Soundtrack ==
Track listing
No.	Title	Lyrics	Music	Singer(s)	Length
1.	"Vaathee Maa Kaireegaa"	Fathimath Nahula	Mohamed Imthiyaz	Ali Rameez, Fazeela Amir	07:27
2.	"Karunun Loaves Fureyney"	Fathimath Nahula	Mohamed Imthiyaz	Fathimath Zoona	04:25
3.	"Dhin Veynugaa Aawaaraa Vey" (Male Version)	Fathimath Nahula	Mohamed Imthiyaz	Ali Rameez	03:03
4.	"Dhaashey Kalaa"	Fathimath Nahula	Mohamed Imthiyaz	Fathimath Zoona, Ismail Shiyaz	05:43
5.	"Dhin Veynugaa Aawaaraa Vey" (Female Version)	Fathimath Nahula	Mohamed Imthiyaz	Fazeela Amir	02:58
Total length:					23:37

== Accolades ==
Year	Award	Category	Recipient(s)	Result
1998	Aafathis Film Award - 1998	Best Actress	Aishath Shiranee	Won
2007	3rd Gaumee Film Awards	Best Actress	Aishath Shiranee	Nominated
