= Dhefirin =

1997 Maldivian film

- Official film poster
- Directed by: Hamid Ali
- Produced by: Aishath Abdul Majeed
- Starring: Hassan Afeef; Jamsheedha Ahmed; Asad Shareef
- Production company: Farivaa Films
- Release date: December 7, 1997
- Country: Maldives
- Language: Dhivehi

Dhefirin is a 1997 Maldivian film directed by Hamid Ali. Produced by Aishath Abdul Majeed under Farivaa Films, the film stars Hassan Afeef, Jamsheedha Ahmed and Asad Shareef in pivotal roles. It marks the first Maldivian film that was primarily shot in Sri Lanka. The rest of the scenes were filmed in Bangkok.

== Premise ==
The film opens as Shehenaz (Jamsheedha Ahmed) applying for a post at a firm managed by Ashraf (Asad Shareef) whom she has encountered before. As days passed by, they bond and narrate their journey leading to where they are today. Shehenaz marries an aspiring entrepreneur, Shah (Hassan Afeef) who spends their whole honeymoon ignoring his wife rather investing in his future business. Their marriage life is filled with turmoil as Shah struggles with workaholism. The relationship crisis hits a new low when Shah divorces her for complaining about his priorities. On the promise that he will reform, Shehenaz gives him a second chance which ended the same as their previous marriage. Shehenaz moves on with her life while Shah attempts to reunite with her. She marries Ashraf who keeps her the happiest she ever imagined. However, this does not stop from Shah conspiring against Shehenaz to break off their marriage.

== Cast ==
- Hassan Afeef as Shah
- Jamsheedha Ahmed as Aishath "Shehenaz" Ali
- Asad Shareef as Ashraf
- Hamid Ali as Junaid; Ashraf's friend
- Aminath Ibrahim Didi as Shehenaz's mother

== Soundtrack ==
Track listing
No.	Title	Singer(s)	Length
1.	"Kurevey Mihandhaan Foheveyhey?"	Abdulla Waheedh (Feeali)	3:45
2.	"Fazaaga Vey Zuvaan"	Fathimath Zoona
3.	"Dhulekey Fisaari Thoonu"	Mohamed Rashad, Fathimath Zoona
4.	"Hiyy Mi Karunaigaa"	Fathimath Zoona
5.	"Loabivanyaa Bunelaa"	Abdulla Waheedh (Feeali)
6.	"Fusvey Fusvey Loa Mathin"	Imaad Ismail

== Reception ==
Upon release, the film received mixed reviews from critics where the settings and cinematography of the film was appraised while the writing and character development were found to be weak.
