= Qurubaan =

Maldivian television series

- Written by: Fathimath Nahula
- Screenplay by: Fathimath Nahula
- Directed by: Mariyam Shauqee
- Starring: Ahmed Giyas; Hawwa; Aishath Shiranee
- Country of origin: Maldives
- Original language: Dhivehi
- No. of seasons: 1
- No. of episodes: 9

Production
- Cinematography: Ahmed Azim
- Editor: Moosa Haleem
- Running time: 22-30 minutes

Original release
- Release: 1994

Qurubaan is a Maldivian television series developed for Television Maldives by Mariyam Shauqee. Written by Fathimath Nahula, the series stars Ahmed Giyas, Hawwa and Aishath Shiranee in pivotal roles.

== Cast ==
=== Main ===
- Ahmed Giyas as Shafraz
- Hawwa as Reesha
- Aishath Shiranee as Nasha

=== Recurring ===
- Mohamed Asif as Amir
- Waleedha Waleed as Nashfa
- Aishath Hanim as Shakeela
- Ibrahim Shakir as Hameed
- Arifa Ibrahim as Khadheeja
- Suneetha Ali as Shifa

=== Guest ===
- Shahidha as Reesha
- Mariyam as Aminath
- Neena as Fathimath
- Majeed
- Zahid
- Rusdhee
- Abdulla Rasheed
- Khalid
- Amir

== Episodes ==
No. in season	Title	Directed by
1	"Episode 1"	Mariyam Shauqee
Nashfa (Waleedha Waleed) and Reesha (Hawwa) are two best-friends, where the former is a prideful and high self-esteem young girl while the latter is more open-minded though influenced by Nashfa. Reesha bumps into Shafraz (Ahmed Giyas) and starts reminiscing her encounter with him, though decides to drop the thoughts of him realizing he is an outsider. Having strong feelings towards him, she frequently visits his retailing store and befriends with him, meanwhile, Nashfa's mother, Shakeela (Aishath Hanim) is concerned that her egocentric behavior might drive life away from her.
2	"Episode 2"	Mariyam Shauqee
Shakeela proposes Nashfa to marry Zahid, a violent and aggressive man whom she had encountered two years back. Nashfa dies in a car accident, which brings sorrow to her family and her best friend. To fill the void of her demise, Shakeela and Hameed (Ibrahim Shakir) decide to bring their second child, Nasha (Aishath Shiranee), who lives abroad for studies, back to home. Nasha seems to have the same attitude and frame of mind of Nashfa; believing in social difference.
3	"Episode 3"	Mariyam Shauqee
Reesha and Nasha attends a sports club though the latter seems reluctant to befriend with other people. Shafraz, smitten by her beauty, admires the attitude of Nasha while Reesha is reluctant to put forward her sentiments. In order to strengthen their family relationship, Shakeela arranges Nasha's marriage to Amir (Asif), the brother of Zahid.
4	"Episode 4"	Mariyam Shauqee
Reesha prepares to depart to Singapore for an IT course, to return in four months. Nasha rebukes Shafraz's offer to be as his friend. However, this does not stop Shafraz from trying to win her heart, which becomes a constant harassment to her.
5	"Episode 5"	Mariyam Shauqee
After a sequence of hate and revenge, things take an unexpected turn, when Nasha starts having feelings towards him while determining to win his heart at any cost, despite her arranged marriage plans. Slowly the reunite and start a romantic relationship.
6	"Episode 6"	Mariyam Shauqee
Hameed is informed by his friend, of Nasha's affair with Shafraz. As requested by her parent, Nasha ultimately agrees to marry Asif, unbeknownst to Shafraz. She further humiliates him at her wedding ceremony.
7	"Episode 7"	Mariyam Shauqee
Reesha returns to Male' and starts taking care of Shafraz. He shows the symptoms of mood-swings and reluctance towards her though she makes every effort to keep him happy and satisfied. A month passes by, but Shafraz's mental condition remains the same. Reesha's mother, Khadheeja (Arifa Ibrahim) pleads him to keep her happy at all times and marry her. However, Shafraz rebuffs her request as he cant replace the spot of Nasha in his heart.
8	"Episode 8"	Mariyam Shauqee
As time passes by, Shafraz has a change of heart and becomes affectionate towards Reesha. Nasha regrets her choice and her family suffers a huge financial loss. Meanwhile, Shafraz acquires a big fortune as his dying uncle passes away with a will on his name for prosperity. Helpless, Nasha returns to Male' and seeks shelter from Reesha's residence where she again meets Shafraz, much to her surprise.
9	"Episode 9"	Mariyam Shauqee
Later that night, Nasha takes the opportunity to seek forgiveness from him. Reesha unintentionally eavesdrops their conversation and decides to sacrifice all her happiness for Nasha, her only friend. Nasha slowly tries to dominate in the house and distance Shafraz from Reesha. She succeeds with her mission and plans her marriage with Shafraz while Reesha facilitates it with a heavy heart. At the last moment, Shafraz reveals that he went ahead with Nasha's plan to secure the love of Reesha behind this effort.

== Soundtrack ==
Track listing
No.	Title	Lyrics	Singer(s)	Length
1.	"Dhehitheh Amaazu Veemaa"	Easa Shareef	Feeali Abdulla Waheedh
2.	"Thasveeru Mithuraa Fenumun"	Fenthashi Mohamed Khaleel	Fenthashi Mohamed Khaleel, Rafiyath Rameeza
3.	"Ufaaverivi Hinthun"		Ahmed Naseer
4.	"Vanee Ummeedhuthah Nethigos"		Ahmed Naseer
5.	"Thiya Soora Lolah Fenumun"		Aathifa Aboobakuru
