= Manzil (Maldivian TV series) =

- Written by: Ahmed Riyaz
- Directed by: Mariyam Shauqee; Arifa Ibrahim
- Starring: Abdulla Munaz; Aishath Shiranee; Mariyam Nisha; Mohamed Aboobakuru; Arifa Ibrahim
- Country of origin: Maldives
- Original language: Dhivehi

Production
- Producer: Mariyam Shauqee
- Cinematography: Mohamed Manik
- Editor: Moosa Haleem

Original release
- Release: 1994

Manzil is a 1994 Maldivian drama Television series directed by Mariyam Shauqee and Arifa Ibrahim. Produced by Shauqee, the series stars Abdulla Munaz, Aishath Shiranee, Mariyam Nisha and Arifa Ibrahim in pivotal roles.

== Premise ==
An intelligent and honest orphan, Zahidha (Aishath Shiranee) moves out of her sister's house unable to tolerate their verbal abuse and settles as a maid at Arifa Ibrahim's house where she befriends her only daughter, Nazima (Mariyam Nisha). As days pass by, her commitment to work is noted by the house owner and the elder son, Nadheem (Abdulla Munaz) while she is bullied by the younger son, Waheed (Mohamed Aboobakuru).

== Cast ==
- Abdulla Munaz as Nadheem
- Aishath Shiranee as Zahidha
- Mariyam Nisha as Nazima
- Mohamed Aboobakuru as Waheed
- Fathimath
- Arifa Ibrahim
- Ibrahim Shakir
- Zareena Yoosuf
- Hawwa Enee
- Gamini
- Suneetha Ali as Jeeza

== Soundtrack ==
Track listing
No.	Title	Singer(s)	Length
1.	"Dhin Mi Veynun"	Aishath Inaya
2.	"Khiyaal Kuranee Ey"	Muaviyath Anwar
3.	"Asaru Nufilaahen"	Aishath Inaya
