= Asad Shareef =

Maldivian film actor and politician

- Born: 4 March 1964 (age 62); Male', Maldives
- Occupations: Actor; politician
- Years active: 1982–present
- Political party: Progressive Party of Maldives

Asad Shareef (born 3 April 1964) is a Maldivian film actor and politician.

== Career ==
=== 1982–2003: Acting career ===
Shareef made his career debut with the film Beykaaru. The film censorship process was completed on the night of scheduled date for theatrical release. During the screening of the film, it had to be abruptly stopped as the length of the film exceeds the permitted duration of theatrical screening which led to a fuss in the cinema.

Ahmed Nimal-directed drama film Shakku was released in 1988, in which Shareef starred alongside Nimal and Fathimath Rameeza as generous friend wrongly accused of cheating. He also starred in Hamid Ali's Dhefirin opposite Hassan Afeef and Jamsheedha Ahmed, which was primarily shot in Sri Lanka. The following year, he collaborated with Abdul Faththaah for his another romantic drama series, Aisha, where he played the second husband of a woman who walks out of an abusive marriage.

In 2001, Shareef received critical acclaim for his role in Aishath Ali Manik's Hiiy Edhenee (2001) which was an unofficial remake of Dharmesh Darshan's romantic film Dhadkan (2000). Cast opposite Sheela Najeeb and Ali Seezan, he reprised the role played by Suniel Shetty in the original. This was followed by another successful film, Ahmed Nimal-sirected Hilihilaa (2001) featuring alongside Niuma Mohamed and Mariyam Nazima playing the character of married man who is haunted by his previous affair.

One of the most successful films from his career, Fathimath Nahula's romantic film Kalaayaanulaa was released in 2003 which follows a happily married couple (played by Yoosuf Shafeeu and Aishath Shirani) where the husband decided to marry his childhood best friend (played by Niuma Mohamed) when his wife fails to sexually please him. The film received widespread critical acclaim and was declared to be year's highest grossing Maldivian film release. The same year, he played the lead role in Imad Ismail-directed horror film Araamagu Dhonkamana (2003), co-starring Mariyam Shazna and Mariyam Nazima. The film narrates the story of a woman spirit who rises from the sea and marries a toddy extractor, disguised as a human being.

=== 2004–present: Political career ===
After announcing retirement from acting, Shareef was more involved in politics. He contested as an individual contestant in the Maldives Media Council election and was selected as one of the council members. He also chairs the law committee of the council. He is also a council member of the political party Progressive Party of Maldives.

== Filmography ==
=== Feature film ===
Year	Title	Role	Notes	Ref(s)
—N/a	Beykaaru			
1988	Shakku	Nahidh		
1990	Karunaige Agu	Shahidh Shareef		
1990	Loabi '90	Shihab		
1993	Thuhumathu	Shareef		
1997	Dhefirin	Ashraf		
2001	Hiiy Edhenee	Shahin		
2001	Hilihilaa	Haidhar		
2003	Kalaayaanulaa	Madhih		
2003	Araamagu Dhonkamana	Dhon Ahammad		

=== Television ===
Year	Title	Role	Notes	Ref(s)
1998–1999	Aisha	Aanim	Main role	
2000	Reysham	Nasih	Main role; 13 episodes	

=== Short film ===
Year	Title	Role	Notes	Ref(s)
2001	Paree Dhahtha	Khalid		
