= Arifa Ibrahim =

Maldivian actress

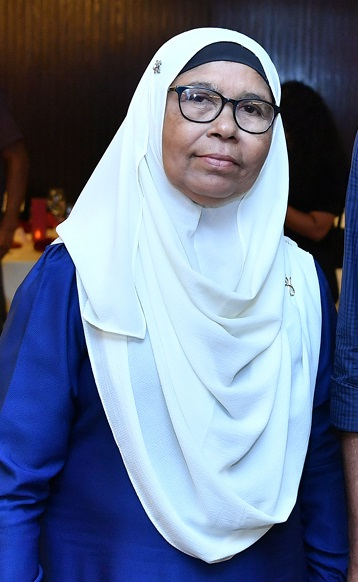
- Arifa at Niuma Mohamed's Silver Jubilee celebration event, 2019
- Born: 22 June 1955 (age 71); Male', Maldives
- Occupations: Actress, director
- Years active: 1984–present

Arifa Ibrahim (born 22 June 1955) is a Maldivian actress, producer, director and writer.

== Early life ==
Daughter of late Ibrahim Fulhu and late Fathma Fulhu, Arifa Ibrahim was born on 22 June 1955. She got married at the age of fourteen and is blessed with five daughters and one son. During her early life, Arifa was famous for stencil designing.

== Career ==
=== 1984–1999: Early releases ===
In 1993, Arifa starred opposite Ahmed Nimal in his direction, a drama film, Sitee. Based on true incidents occurred to a friend of Nimal, the film focuses on a fisherman who later turns to be a successful businessman and his search for his father. The film regarded as one of the "Best Maldivian Films" features Arifa in the role Naseema, a poor woman who looks after her only son. This was followed by her collaboration with Yoosuf Rafeeu for his tragedy drama film Vaudhu which follows the separation of a happy couple due to the societal differences.

The following year, Arifa starred alongside Chilhiya Moosa Manik, Hassan Afeef, Lillian Saeed and Mariyam Haajara in Ibrahim Rasheed's family drama Dhevana An'bi. She played the role of Majidha, a wily wife who marries a wealthy bank manager and destroys the marriage of her daughter-in-law. The film revolves around a couple who gets separated due to discrimination by a cunning mother-in-law regarding social status. The same year, she featured in a small role in Mohamed Niyaz's only directed feature film Dheriyaa which requisites the style of film-making the industry follows. The film was critically appreciated and was a commercial success, by showing thirty two housefull shows at cinema. She next appeared in Yoosuf Rafeeu's award-winning film Haqqu as Asima, mother of Shahid who reluctantly forced her only son to marry a woman he dissent. The film starring Mariyam Nisha, Reeko Moosa Manik and Mariyam Shakeela in lead roles, received positive reviews from critics. The following year she starred and directed the family drama Manzil which follows an intelligent and hardworking orphan, played by Aishath Shiranee, whose life turns a dramatic change while working as a servant in a reputed family. This was followed by her performance as a helpless mother in the Abdulla Shujau's Nafrathu (1994).

Arifa played the role of a responsible aunt who discovers the immoral relationship of her niece with her teacher, in Amjad Ibrahim's debut direction Huras (1996). The film was developed solely with the intention of winning Gaumee Film Awards though it failed to garner any award at 2nd Gaumee Film Awards ceremony. The same year, she played the role of an abusive mother mistreating her adopted child, in Mohamed Rasheed's Hifehettumeh Neiy Karuna, starring opposite Niuma Mohamed, Abdul Raheem and Ibrahim Wisan.

Easa Shareef's horror film Fathis Handhuvaru, starring Reeko Moosa Manik and Niuma Mohamed was released in 1997. The film tells a conflicting love story of a married young woman who falls in love with a ghost and the consequences when her family expands from either sides. She played mother of Zoona, the fearless lady who has been trapped in the powers of a ghost. The film is celebrated as the most successful and most watched Maldivian film with highest number of shows screened on release. It was also widely appreciated by the critics and was considered to be the "all time favorite" Maldivian film. Arifa also appeared in a Television Maldives production, Fun Asaru which follows two women; one searching for her mother and one fighting cancer. The following year, she played the aunt of Nasiha, an attractive young woman in a relationship with a married man and a patient suffering from congenital heart disease in Abdul Faththaah's television drama series Dhoapatta (2000). Starring alongside Mohamed Shavin, Sheela Najeeb and Niuma Mohamed, the series centers on unrequited love and complications of a relationship within and beyond marriage. Her collaboration with Faththaah was repeated the same year with another romantic drama series, Aisha where she played the short-tempered and abusive mother. Mariyam Shauqee's widely acclaimed family drama television series Kahthiri was released during the same year, where she played the role of the influential mother of an extended family living in a congested housing complex, dealing with several social issues.

In 2000, Arifa played the mother of an unattractive fun-loving tomboy, in Hussain Adil's romance Hiyy Halaaku alongside Yoosuf Shafeeu, Niuma Mohamed and Sheela Najeeb. The plot combines two love triangles set years apart. The first half covers friends on a college campus, while the second tells the story of a widower's young daughter who tries to reunite her dad with his old friend. The film was an unofficial remake of Karan Johar's romantic drama film Kuch Kuch Hota Hai (1998) starring Shah Rukh Khan, Kajol and Rani Mukerji in the lead role. She was also signed to play a helpless yet caring mother opposite Reeko Moosa Manik, Shiznee and Jamsheedha Ahmed in Hussain Adhil-directed Sirru (1998).

=== 2000–04: Critical acclaim with side roles ===
Amjad Ibrahim-directed Ainbehge Loabi Firiehge Vaajib, starring Arifa, Yoosuf Shafeeu, Jamsheedha Ahmed and Niuma Mohamed was released in 2000. The film revolves around a woman who has been mistreated by her step-mother and forced into a marriage she disapproves. Arifa played the role of Zahidha, the villainous mother who treats her step-daughter badly. At the 3rd Gaumee Film Awards, Arifa was bestowed with Best Supporting Actress award for her performance in the film. The same year, she starred in another Amjad Ibrahim's direction, a comedy drama film, Majubooru Loabi (2000) opposite Mariyam Nisha and Yoosuf Shafeeu which focuses on a failing marriage of a comprehensive man and an emotionally immature woman.

She next starred in Ali Shameel's drama film Hithi Nimun (2001) opposite Mohamed Shavin, Mariyam Nisha and Sheereen Abdul Wahid, which follows the storyline of a stubborn young man who abandons his girlfriend when he discovers about her pregnancy. She then worked for Aishath Ali Manik-directed Hiiy Edhenee (2001) which was an unofficial remake of Dharmesh Darshan's romantic film Dhadkan (2000) starring Akshay Kumar, Suniel Shetty and Shilpa Shetty in the lead role. Cast opposite Asad Shareef and Sheela Najeeb, she played the role of a caring mother loves her illegitimate son whole-heartedly.

In 2002, Arifa featured alongside Mariyam Nisha, Yoosuf Shafeeu, Mariyam Nazima, Moosa Zakariyya and Ahmed Shimau in Shimau-directed family drama film Loabi Nuvevununama. Written by Fathimath Nahula, the story narrates the journey of a handicapped man who has been betrayed in love and unknowingly marries his brother's love interest. She plays the gluttonous mother who forcibly arranges her daughter's marriage for money. The film was a critical and commercial success.

The following year, she collaborated with Fathimath Nahula for her romantic film Kalaayaanulaa (2003), which follows a happily married couple (played by Yoosuf Shafeeu and Aishath Shiranee) where the husband decided to marry his childhood best friend (played by Niuma Mohamed) when his wife fails to sexually please him. The film received widespread critical acclaim for its performances and was declared to be year's highest grossing Maldivian film release. She was applauded for her performance as the villainous aunt, in the Abdul Faththaah-directed critically acclaimed television series, Thiyey Mihithuge Vindhakee (2003) which was considered as one of the best series production in television industry.

=== 2004–15: Television series direction ===
She then stepped into Fathimath Nahula's critically and commercially successful romantic drama television series, Kalaage Haqqugaa to portray the role of a foul-mouthed woman who reluctantly agrees to help an orphan. She rose to widespread prominence in the television industry by directing the critically acclaimed television series, Vairoalhi Ahves Sirrun (2005) which revolves around two best-friends involved in extra-marital affairs and who fail to practice their duty as husband and wife. Starring Niuma Mohamed, Lufshan Shakeeb, Ahmed Asim, Aminath Rasheedha and Mariyam Shakeela, the series was listed as one of the most successful television series. The following year, Arifa again collaborated with the team of Vairoalhi Ahves Sirrun for another romantic television drama series, Vaguthu Faaithu Nuvanees (2006) which consists of fifty episodes. The series which follows the vengeance and retribution two best-friends go through when they both love the same person, received critical and commercial success. Her next appearance was as Khadheeja, an abusive mother-in-law in Yoosuf Shafeeu and Fathimath Nahula's direction, Soora released in 2008. The film was originally released as a television series to positive response.

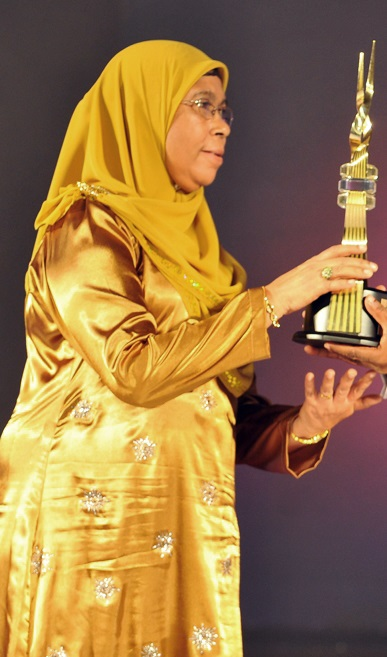
Ibrahim at 2nd Maldives Film Awards ceremony, 2012

In 2009, Arifa starred opposite Ali Seezan, Niuma Mohamed and Nadhiya Hassan as the iniquitous step-mother in Seezan's melodrama Karuna Vee Beyvafa (2009). The film follows a downfall of a happily married couple on realizing the wife's infertility and destruction of their relationship with the invasion of a second wife. Arifa's first release of 2010 was Ali Seezan-directed family drama Maafeh Neiy alongside Seezan and Niuma Mohamed. The film highlights many social issues including human rights abuses, forced marriages and domestic violence. She played the role of Abidha, a mother who forcefully marries her daughter to a wealthy businessman. The film received mixed reviews from critics, majority of them dismissing its melodrama and was a moderate success at box office.

The following year, she played a brief role of Saudhiyya, a gossiping woman who exposes the relationship of one of her neighbors to her family, in the Moomin Fuad-directed crime tragedy drama Loodhifa. Featuring an ensemble cast, the film deals with current social issues in the society told from different perspectives of the characters. Made on a budget of MVR 600,000, the film was declared a commercial failure though it received wide critical acclaim, praising the performance of cast and the film's "realism" in its language, characters and their attitude. The same year, she starred alongside Ali Seezan, Aishath Rishmy and Mariyam Nisha, in Abdul Faththaah-directed 14 Vileyrey. Written by Ibrahim Waheed, the project faced controversy when the team of Kuhveriakee Kaakuhey accuses Fatthah for "purloining the plot" of the latter. The film and her performance received mixed to positive reviews from critics". The film did good business at box office and was declared a "Hit". A "forgettable performance" of Arifa was released with Hamid Ali's romantic family drama Laelaa alongside Amira Ismail and Yoosuf Shafeeu which was a critical and box office failure.

In 2015, Arifa appeared in Ali Seezan's action film Ahsham. Though the film received mixed reviews from critics, her performance as Haajara, an influential political leader was widely acclaimed. The film, made on a budget of MVR 1,500,000, was considered as the most expensive film made in Maldives. It was one of the three entries from Maldives to the SAARC Film Festival in 2016.

=== 2017–present: Further releases ===
Two years later, Hassan appeared in Abdul Faththaah's romantic drama Hahdhu (2017) alongside Mariyam Azza, Aminath Rishfa and Ahmed Shiban. The film touched upon controversial issues in the Maldives including the depiction of flogging and also shines a light on mental health by featuring an attempted suicide. The film opened to mixed reviews from critics though it emerged as one of the highest grossing Maldivian films of the year. She was next seen alongside Yoosuf Shafeeu, Fathimath Azifa and Jadhulla Ismail in the Mohamed Aboobakuru-directed Neydhen Vakivaakah, which was a critical and commercial failure.

2018 was a dull year for Maldivian film-industry with regards to 2018 Maldivian presidential election. Her only release of the year was the first Maldivian web-series, a romantic drama by Fathimath Nahula, Huvaa. The series consisting of sixty episodes and streamed through the digital platform Baiskoafu, centers around a happy and radiant family which breaks into despairing pieces after a tragic incident that led to an unaccountable loss. The series and her performance as a mother of four children trying to bring peace into the family were positively received.

== Filmography ==
=== Feature film ===
Year	Title	Role	Notes	Ref(s)
—N/a	Giritee Loabi	Shafiya		
1993	Sitee	Naseema		
1993	Vaudhu	Sheereena		
1994	Dhevana An'bi	Majidha		
1994	Zakham	Shareefa		
1994	Dheriyaa	Dhonkanbulo		
1994	Nafrathu	Aneesa		
1996	Hagu An'bi	Najuma's sister		
1996	Fun Asaru	Hana's mother		
1996	Haqqu	Asima		
1996	Huras	Hawwa		
1996	Hifehettumeh Neiy Karuna	Shakeela		
1997	Diary	Shehenaz's mother		
1997	Fathis Handhuvaru	Zoona's mother		
1997	Heelaiy	Hawwa Mohamed		
1998	Dhauvaa	Soma's mother	Also the director	
1998	Olhunuvi Hiyy	Sheeba's mother		
1998	Ethoofaaneerey	Aishath's mother		
1998	Sirru	Jeeza		
2000	Hiyy Halaaku	Fazlee's mother		
2000	Ainbehge Loabi Firiehge Vaajib	Zahidha	Gaumee Film Award for Best Supporting Actress	
2000	Majubooru Loabi	Aisthu		
2000	Shaalinee	Arifa		
2001	Hithi Nimun	Raniya's mother		
2001	Hiiy Edhenee	Shahin's mother		
2002	Loabi Nuvevununama	Nasma's mother		
2003	Edhi Edhi Hoadheemey	Latheefa		
2003	Kalaayaanulaa	Leena's mother		
2009	Karuna Vee Beyvafa	Kuda Manike		
2010	Maafeh Neiy	Abidha		
2011	Loodhifa	Saudhiyya		
2011	14 Vileyrey	—N/a		
2011	Laelaa	—N/a		
2015	Randhari	Mariyam		
2015	Ahsham	Haajara		
2017	Hahdhu	Ali's mother		
2017	Neydhen Vakivaakah	Shihan and Nizam's mother		
2019	Maamui	Arifa Ahmed	Special appearance	

=== Television ===
Year	Title	Role	Notes	Ref(s)
1992	Viha Loabi			
1993	Dhanmalhi	Fareedha's mother	Teledrama	
1994	Manzil	Nazima's mother	Also the director Recurring role	
1994	Furusathu	Sharudha's mother		
1994	Hithi Thajuribaa	Asma's sister-in-law	Recurring role	
1994	Qurubaan	Khadheeja	Recurring role; 5 episodes	
1996	Riheyfai Mahchah Foi			
1996	Dhiriulhumakee Miee!		In the episode "Muhammaa Kaloa"	
1997–1999	Kahthiri	Hawwa Manike	Main role; 49 episodes	
1998–1999	Aisha	Ameena	Main role	
2000	Dhoapatta	Nasiha's aunt	Recurring role	
2004	Thiyey Mihithuge Vindhakee	Zareena	Recurring role; 12 episodes	
2004	Kamana Vareh Neiy	Fareedha	Recurring role; 2 episodes	
2005	Loabi Vaanama	Habeeba	Recurring role; 13 episodes	
2005	Kalaage Haqqugaa	Habeeb's wife	Recurring role	
2005	Baiveriyaa	Faheema's friend	Guest role; "Episode 10"	
2007–2008	Vimlaa			
2008	Hinithun Velaashey Kalaa	Zubeir's wife	Guest role; "Episode 52"	
2008	Soora	Khadheeja	Recurring role	
2018–2020	Huvaa	Maariya	Main role	

=== Short film ===
Year	Title	Role	Notes	Ref(s)
2007	Ossunu Iraaeku	Mariyam's grandmother		
2010	Dhekafi	Aminath		
2020	KKB: Kuda Kuda Baaru	Zoona's mother		

=== Other work ===
Year	Title	Director	Screenplay	Notes	Ref(s)
1998	Dhauvaa	Yes	Yes	Feature film	
1999	Loabiveriyaa	Yes		Feature film	
2000	Saahibaa	Yes	Yes	Feature film	
2003–2004	Vaisoori	Yes	Yes	52 episodes	
2005–2006	Vairoalhi Ahves Sirrun	Yes	Yes	52 episodes	
2006–2007	Vaguthu Faaithu Nuvanees	Yes	Yes	50 episodes	
2007	Wafaatheri Nuvevunas	Yes		26 episodes	
2007–2008	Vimlaa	Yes		26 episodes	

== Accolades ==
Year	Award	Category	Nominated work	Result	Ref(s)
1998	Aafathis Awards - 1997	Best Supporting Actress	Diary	Won	
2007	3rd Gaumee Film Awards	Best Supporting Actress	Ainbehge Loabi Firiehge Vaajib	Won	
2008	2nd Miadhu Crystal Award	Best Director	Vaguthu Faaithu Nuvanees	Won	
2012	2nd Maldives Film Awards	Lifetime Achievement Award		Won	
