= Hassan Afeef =

Maldivian film actor

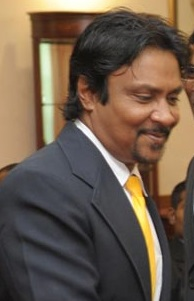
- Afeef in 2011
- Occupation: Actor
- Years active: 1982–2010

Hassan Afeef is a Maldivian film actor. He is celebrated as the actor being featured in the first Maldivian film and song. He is also noted to be the actor to have worked with most directors away from home and acted in most films that were shot abroad.

== Career ==
In late 1979, Hassan Afeef, a cinema-goer used to watch several Bollywood films screened at limited cinemas in Maldives and imitate their acting afterwards among friends and family. A group of Maldivians including Afeef came up with the idea of making a regional film for the Maldivian audience though several obstacles emerged including incapability to secure finance and equipment. However, they were successful in acquiring a small camera which resulted in the first Maldivian song "Noorey Vidhee Moonun Roashan Ujaala" featuring Jim alongside Rahma. Shot at Sultan Park, the song was leaked prior its official release hence Afeef dismissed the project of making a film with the team.

After three years, under the helm of then Minister of Health, Musthafa Hussain, Afeef was cast as the lead for the first Maldivian film Thin Fiyavalhu (1982). The film tells a story of a romantic relationship between a girl who comes to Male' from an island and a boy who lives in the house she resides in Male'. The film was accepted and appreciated by the audience. In an interview, Afeef stated; "In the first film, little we did care about dialogue delivery. You are unsure of how you look and sound. It was made just for a namesake".

In 1994, Afeef starred alongside Chilhiya Moosa Manik, Arifa Ibrahim, Lillian Saeed and Mariyam Haajara in Ibrahim Rasheed's family drama Dhevana An'bi. He played the role of Shahid, a hotel manager who falls in love with a daughter of a wealthy bank manager. The film revolves around a couple who get separated due to discrimination regarding social status by a cunning mother-in-law. He was also part of the Mohamed Musthafa Hussain's critically acclaimed film Nufolhey Maa which focuses on a love triangle between a doctor, nurse and patient.

Afeef played the role of a teacher who becomes involved in an immoral relationship with one of his students, in Amjad Ibrahim's debut direction Huras (1996). The film was developed solely with the intention of winning Gaumee Film Awards though it failed to garner any award at 2nd Gaumee Film Awards ceremony. In 1999, Afeef played the role of a friend counselling his best friend on dealing with his obsessed girlfriend in Ahmed Ibrahim's Nuruhunvi Loabi. Also, he starred opposite Reeko Moosa Manik, Niuma Mohamed and Mariyam Nazima as an unlucky lover in Easa Shareef-directed Emme Fahu Dhuvas (2000) which follows a devious woman who sunders her best-friend's upcoming marriage by creating false accusation and staging misleading impressions. Mariyam Shauqee's widely acclaimed family drama television series Kahthiri was released during the following year, where he played the role of a mechanical engineer, living in a congested housing complex while dealing with several social issues.

He next starred in Ali Shameel's drama film Hithi Nimun (2001) opposite Mohamed Shavin, Mariyam Nisha and Sheereen Abdul Wahid, which follows the storyline of a stubborn young man who abandons his girlfriend when he discovers about her pregnancy. He was applauded for his performance as the short-tempered husband and a helpful friend, in the Abdul Faththaah-directed critically acclaimed television series, Thiyey Mihithuge Vindhakee (2003) which was considered as one of the best series production in television industry.

Afeef played the role of Shathir, a notable historian, who came to a haunted uninhabited island to prepare a thesis for his PhD in Abdul Fattah's horror film Eynaa (2004). It features Sheela Najeeb, Mohamed Manik, Ahmed Shah, Khadheeja Ibrahim Didi, Ibrahim Jihad and Nashidha Mohamed as six colleagues who go on a picnic to the same island and their battle for survival. The film garnered critical appreciation especially for its technical department and was a commercial success.

== Personal life ==
After quitting films, Afeef became more involved in politics. He served as a member of Male' City Council administering 38 mosques. Regarding his decision to step aside from the industry, Afeef noted: "I was missing prayers back then. I feared more about directors and producers insecurity when I have to wash my make-up off for each prayer, ultimately missing several prayers".

== Filmography ==
Year	Title	Role	Notes	Ref(s)
1982	Thin Fiyavalhu	—N/a		
1989	Nufolhey Maa	Shiyam		
1994	Dhevana An'bi	Shahid		
1994	Zakham	Asif		
1994	Karuna	Nadheem		
1996	Huras	Anil		
1997	Diary	Arif		
1997	Dhefirin	Shah		
1999	Nuruhunvi Loabi	Afeef	Special appearance	
2000	Emme Fahu Dhuvas	Shahid		
2001	Hithi Nimun	Khalid		
2004	Eynaa	Shathir		
2010	Dhin Veynuge Hithaamaigaa	Himself	Special appearance in the song "Annaashey Hinithun Velamaa"	

=== Short film ===
Year	Title	Role	Notes
2008	Girlfriend	Adhnan	

=== Television ===
Year	Title	Role	Notes	Ref(s)
1997–1999	Kahthiri	Azmee	Main role; 78 episodes	
2000	Maafkuraashey	Doctor	Guest role; "Episode 9"	
2002	Fahu Fiyavalhu	Shiyam Ibrahim	Main role; 5 episodes	
2003	Ujaalaa Raasthaa	Hussain Manik	Main role; 13 episodes	
2003–2004	Vaisoori	Ziyad / Naeem	In the segments "Loaiybaa Eku" and "Kurin Visnaa Dhevunu Nama"	
2003–2005	Thiyey Mihithuge Vindhakee	Amir	Main role; 44 episodes	
2004–2005	Loabi Nulibunas	Ihusan	Recurring role; 5 episodes	
2005	Baiveriyaa	Badheeu	Recurring role; 8 episodes	
2005	Fukkashi	Ibrahim Manik	Episode: "Buhdhi Boa"	
2006	Ikhthiyaaru		Recurring role	
2007	Aharenge Lha Daddy	Ismail	Main role	

== Accolades ==
Year	Award	Category	Nominated work	Result	Ref(s)
2025	1st MSPA Film Awards	Lifetime Achievement Award		Won	
