= Ismail Wajeeh =

Maldivian actor and choreographer

- Born: 20 September 1962 (age 63); Malé, Maldives
- Occupation: Actor
- Years active: 1984–2001; 2017–present
- Children: 5

Ismail Wajeeh (20 September 1962) is a Maldivian actor and choreographer.

== Early life ==
While studying in primary school, Wajeeh, along with his nephews used to perform songs and stage shows to small gatherings. While studying in grade 4, he was offered to be part of an English radio drama produced by the Voice of Maldives, titled "The Enormous Turnip". During his secondary education, he played small roles in stage dramas as an extra. In 1982, he got offered by the leading theatre performing group, Cultural and Drama Society (CDS) to be part of their group.

== Career ==
In 1984, while Wajeeh was working in Television Maldives, he meets the director Mohamed Hilmy, a friend of his brother, who asked Wajeeh if he is interested to be the lead actor of his upcoming film, Chuttee (1984), to which he agrees instantly. In the film, he played a shady character which was well received by the critics and audience.

The Mohamed Hilmy and Ali Waheed directed film, Ihsaas was released in 1993 in which Wajeeh starred as an orphan who is psychologically disturbed following a false arrest. His "genuine" performance received positive reviews from critics and resulted in winning a Gaumee Film Award for Best Actor. The next year, he starred in Ali Waheed-directed Kulunu where he played the role of a doctor who is forced to marry his childhood friend. Mariyam Shauqee's widely acclaimed family drama television series Kahthiri was released in 1997; here Wajeeh played the role of a stay home husband, living in a congested housing complex while dealing with various social issues.

In 2000, he appeared in two films; Hussain Shihab's drama film Rihun and Mohamed Ali Manik's Maazee alongside Jamsheedha Ahmed, Mariyam Nazima and Aminath Rasheedha which narrates the story of two best friends, a boy and a girl, who get separated at childhood and reunite as adults. Ahmed played the role of underprivileged young man who turns into a successful person due to his hardwork and determination.

The following year he starred as a widower in the Abdulla Sujau and Abdul Faththaah-directed family drama Ranmuiy (2001) which is centered on the dispute between a daughter and her step-mother. The film was heavily marketed for its item song featuring himself and Indian actress Rajeshwari, which also marks the first international collaboration in the local industry. Afterwards, he relocated to Singapore and disappeared in all local productions.

Sixteen years later, Wajeeh made a comeback in a special appearance with the Dark Rain Entertainment's production, the romantic comedy Mee Loaybakee (2017) followed by another of their comedy films Maamui (2019).

== Personal life ==
Apart from acting, Wajeeh served as the Assistant Principal in Jamaluddin School. Afterwards, he started working as a program coordinator at Television Maldives. He married a Singapore-Indian woman residing in Singapore and relocated to Singapore in 2001, hoping to provide better education for their children.

== Filmography ==
=== Feature film ===
Year	Title	Role	Notes	Ref(s)
1984	Chuttee			
1993	Ihsaas	Mohamed Unaiz	Gaumee Film Award for Best Actor	
1994	Kulunu	Rashidh		
1997	Heelaiy	News presenter	Special appearance	
1998	Huvafen			
2000	Rihun	Unaiz		
2000	Maazee	Ahmed Imran		
2001	Ranmuiy	Waheedh		
2017	Mee Loaybakee	Ismail	Special appearance	
2019	Maamui	Jaguar		
2023	November	Sam		

=== Television ===
Year	Title	Role	Notes	Ref(s)
1997	Huvafaiy			
1997–1999	Kahthiri	Umar	Main role; 38 episodes	
1998	Ehan'dhaan			
1998	Raalhubaani		Teledrama	
1999	Maafkuraashey	Moosa's boss	Guest role; "Episode 2"	
1999	Hamaekani Dharifulhahtakai...	Umaiz	Teledrama	
2000	Kashithanmathi	Fareedh	Teledrama	
2021	Rumi á Jannat	Sam	Guest role; Episode: "Vaashey Mashaa Ekee"	

== Accolades ==
Year	Award	Category	Nominated work	Result	Ref(s)
1995	1st Gaumee Film Awards	Best Actor	Ihsaas	Won	
1995	1st Gaumee Film Awards	Best Makeup	Ihsaas (Shared with Mohamed Hilmy)	Won	
