= Aishath Shiranee =

Maldivian actress

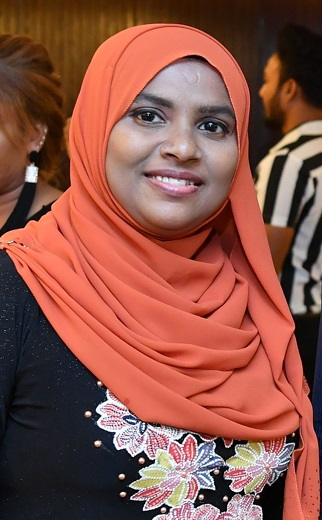
- Shiranee in 2019
- Born: 16 January 1975 (age 51); Male', Maldives
- Occupation: Actress
- Years active: 1992–2003
- Children: 1

Aishath Shiranee (born 16 January 1975) is a Maldivian former film actress. Shiranee is the recipient of several awards, including one Gaumee Film Award and three Aafathis Awards. In 2001, the Government of Maldives honoured her with the National Award of Recognition.

== Career ==
While working in a job at Maldives Customs Service, Shiranee made her screen debut with a video single titled "Hithaa Roohun Asaru Kuranee" alongside Ahmed Ghiyas which was followed by several other video songs before making her film debut with the film Naseebu (1992).

Apart from the Abdulla Shujau directed drama film Nafrathu (1994), Shiranee starred in the Arifa Ibrahim-directed family drama Manzil (1994) which portrays her as an intelligent and hardworking orphan, whose life takes a dramatic turn while working as a servant in a reputed family. The same year, she starred in Ali Waheed-directed Kulunu which fetched her first Gaumee Film Award for Best Supporting Actress. She also appeared in a Television Maldives production, Fun Asaru (1996) which follows two women; one searching for her mother and one fighting cancer. Her performance in the second half of the film received positive reviews from critics.

Mariyam Shauqee's widely acclaimed family drama television series Kahthiri was released in 1997; here Shiranee played the role of a TV presenter living in a congested housing complex while dealing with various social issues. The same year, she played the role of a blind girl in Abdulla Sujau-directed Laila (1997), followed by her collaboration with Ahmed Mohamed Didi for his crime thriller film, Heelaiy (1997). An unofficial remake of Abbas–Mustan's Bollywood film Baazigar (1993), she played dual roles of a young woman who is murdered by a clever man and the sister seeking revenge on the assault.

In 2000, she played the role of a factory manager who gets meddled in a love affair of two friends, in Ahmed Nimal's family drama Sababu. She next starred in the film Rihun (2000) opposite Ismail Wajeeh which received mixed reviews from critics. This was followed by the year's most successful Maldivian film, Ahmed Nimal's horror classic Zalzalaa, in which Shiranee portrays a jinn who enthralls a middle-aged man.

One of the most successful films from her career, Fathimath Nahula's romantic film Kalaayaanulaa was released in 2003 which follows a happily married couple (played by Yoosuf Shafeeu and Shiranee) where the husband decided to marry his childhood best friend (played by Niuma Mohamed) when his wife fails to sexually please him. The film received widespread critical acclaim and was declared to be year's highest grossing Maldivian film release. Her portrayal of the unfortunate first wife, garnered her a Miadhu Crystal Award for Best Supporting Actress and a Gaumee Film Award for Best Supporting Actress nomination

== Media image ==
Shiranee is considered among the most popular and high-profile celebrities in Maldives. Analysing her career, Aishath Maaha from Avas wrote: "Emotional, Joyful or Envious, Shiranee fits perfectly to all roles and all her performances can easily be graded with full marks".

== Filmography ==
=== Feature film ===
Year	Title	Role	Notes	Ref(s)
1992	Naseebu			
1993	Thuhumathu	Shareef's sister		
1994	Zakham	Nadhiya		
1994	Kulunu	Nasheedha	Gaumee Film Award for Best Supporting Actress	
1994	Nafrathu	Fazna		
1996	Fun Asaru	Hana		
1997	Laila	Laila	Nominated—Gaumee Film Award for Best Actress	
1997	Heelaiy	Naazleen / Naazneen	Dual roles	
1998	Ethoofaaneerey	Nifasha		
1999	Sababu	Liusha		
2000	Rihun	Maana		
2000	Zalzalaa	Unnamed		
2000	Namoonaa			
2001	Hiyy Heyokuraathi			
2003	Kalaayaanulaa	Leena	Nominated—Gaumee Film Award for Best Supporting Actress	

=== Television ===
Year	Title	Role	Notes
1993	Dhen Keehkuraanee?	Fazeela	Teledrama
1993	Gundolhi	Shirumeena	Teledrama
1993	Haalathu	Aishath	Teledrama
1994	Manzil	Zahidha	Main role
1994	Inthizaaru	Inaya	Main role; 13 episodes
1994	Furusathu	Sharudha	Main role
1994	Dhanthura	Afra	Teledrama
1994	Qurubaan	Nasha	Main role; 8 episodes
1996	Malakaa	Malakaa	Teledrama
1996	Badhunaam	Ziuna	Teledrama
1997	Huvafaiy		Main role
1997	Oyaa Dhiya Hayaaiy	Shaalinee / Shaalinee's mother	Dual roles
1997–1999	Kahthiri	Aishath Rashfa	Main role; 49 episodes
1998	Ehan'dhaan		Main role
1998	Raalhubaani		Teledrama
2024	Yaaraa	Herself	Narrator; "Episode 50"

== Accolades ==
Year	Award	Category	Nominated work	Result	Ref(s)
1993	Aafathis Award - 1993	Best Dance	Naseebu	Won	
1995	1st Gaumee Film Awards	Best Supporting Actress	Kulunu	Won	
1995	1st Gaumee Film Awards	Best Actress	Zakham	Nominated	
1996	Aafathis Award - 1995	Best Actress	Zakham	Won	
1997	2nd Gaumee Film Awards	Best Actress	Fun Asaru	Nominated	
1998	Aafathis Award - 1997	Best Dance	Heelaiy	Won	
1998	Aafathis Film Award - 1998	Best Actress	Laila	Won	
2001	National Award of Recognition	Performing Arts - Acting		Won	
2007	3rd Gaumee Film Awards	Best Actress	Laila	Nominated	
2007	1st Miadhu Crystal Awards	Best Supporting Actress	Kalaayaanulaa	Won	
2007	4th Gaumee Film Awards	Best Supporting Actress	Kalaayaanulaa	Nominated	
2025	1st MSPA Film Awards	Lifetime Achievement Award		Won	
