= Chilhiya Moosa Manik =

Maldivian film actor and writer (1940–2021)

Moosa Manik
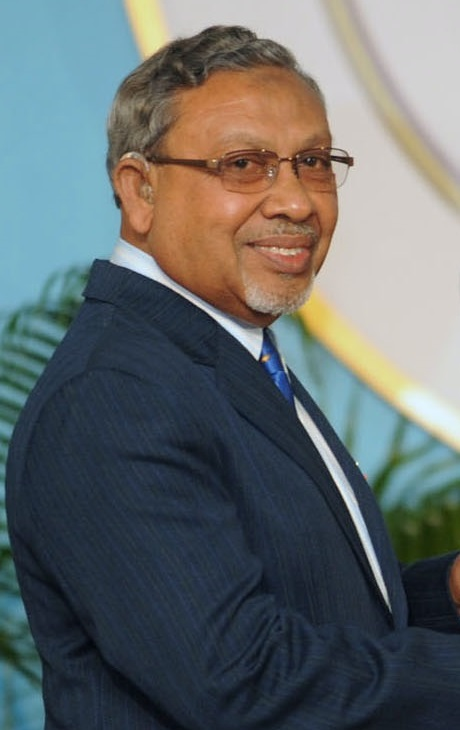
- Manik receiving the National Award of Recognition, 2009
- Born: January 30, 1940; Male', Maldives
- Died: August 24, 2021 (aged 81)
- Occupations: Actor, Screenwriter
- Years active: 1982–2010

Moosa Manik commonly known as Chilhiya Moosa Manik (30 January 1940 – 24 August 2021) was a Maldivian film actor and writer.

== Early life ==
In 1977, while studying at Majeediyya School, Manik participated in the theatre play performed to celebrate the Golden jubilee of Majeediyya School. He then joined several other theatre performances as a hobby though his first priority lies in sketching and drawing, followed by writing. His most notable performance as a theatre artist includes his role as Viyazor; the administrative chief of the Portuguese kingdom who invaded and ruled over Maldives. His work as a theatre performer was appreciated by the government of Maldives and he was bestowed with the National Award of Recognition in 1983.

== Career ==
Manik made his screen debut in 1982 with a Television Maldives production titled Ghaazee Bandaarain where he reprised the role of Viyazor, which he performed in his previous theatre plays. One of the earliest releases in Maldivian cinema, the film narrates the invasion of Portuguese in Maldives and the re-capturing of Malé by Muhammad Thakurufaanu Al Auzam. His "authentic" performance was appreciated by the critics and audiences which resulted in him receiving several film offers from producers.

In 1993, he appeared in Ibrahim Rasheed-directed film Beyvafaa where he played the role of a concerned father who disowns his son with regard to his decision to marry a blind orphan. In his next release, Ahmed Nimal's Sitee, Manik portrayed a character who adopts an orphan and assists him in the search for his father. The following year, Manik starred alongside Hassan Afeef, Arifa Ibrahim, Lillian Saeed and Mariyam Haajara in Ibrahim Rasheed's family drama Dhevana An'bi, in which he played the role of an underprivileged senior citizen who changed the life of an ordinary man with his intellects and determination. The film revolves around a couple who gets separated due to social discrimination initiated by a cunning mother-in-law.

Hamid Ali's Badhal was released in 1996, in which he starred alongside Ali, Hussain Sobah and Niuma Mohamed as a wealthy businessman who is being duped in a series of events caused due to a misunderstanding by a "non-existent" twin. He also appeared in a Television Maldives production, Fun Asaru (1996) which follows two women; one searching for her mother and one fighting cancer. This was followed by his brief role in Amjad Ibrahim's debut direction Huras (1996) which was developed with the sole intention of winning Gaumee Film Awards though it failed to garner any award at 2nd Gaumee Film Awards ceremony. The next year, Manik appeared alongside Hussain Sobah, Mariyam Nisha and Jamsheedha Ahmed as the father of an established actress who sacrifices her career for an underprivileged talented vocalist in Amjad Ibrahim's Loabeege Aniyaa. Mariyam Shauqee's widely acclaimed family drama television series Kahthiri was released in 1998, where he played the role of the chief of the district council advocating for the right of citizens and was credited as the writer of the series along with Fathimath Nahula and Ibrahim Rasheed.

In 2000, Manik starred alongside Ahmed Asim, Mariyam Nazima, Koyya Hassan Manik and Waleedha Waleed in Haajara Abdul Kareem-directed Ajaaib which depicts the relationship of two exemplary wives and their respective families regardless of societal norms. Apart from playing the father of an emotionally immature wife in Amjad Ibrahim's comedy drama film, Majubooru Loabi (2000), he also featured as a wealthy businessman who marries a gold-digger in Aslam Rasheed's Shaalinee. Besides, he appeared in year's most successful Maldivian film, Ahmed Nimal's horror classic Zalzalaa, where he played the spiritual old man treating a man possessed by a female spirit assigned to complete an unfulfilled prophecy.

The following year, he starred in Ali Shameel's drama film Hithi Nimun (2001) opposite Mohamed Shavin, Mariyam Nisha and Sheereen Abdul Wahid, which follows the storyline of a stubborn young man who abandons his girlfriend when he discovers about her pregnancy.

In 2003, Manik played a supporting role in Imad Ismail-directed horror film Araamagu Dhonkamana (2003) which narrates the story of a woman spirit who rises from the sea and marries a toddy extractor, disguised as a human being. He also collaborated with Abdul Faththaah for his romantic disaster film, Hureemey Inthizaarugaa (2005) cast along with Ravee Farooq, Mariyam Zuhura, Waleedha Waleed, Ibrahim Jihad and Neena Saleem. The film, heavily relied on the effect of the 2004 Indian Ocean earthquake on the Maldives, received favorable reviews from critics though it failed to perform financially. Manik played the father of Reena, who has been traumatized by the events that lead to a big loss in her family. Apart from playing the calm and genuine father in Abdul Faththaah-directed critically acclaimed television series, Thiyey Mihithuge Vindhakee (2003), Manik appeared in Fathimath Nahula's critically and commercially successful romantic drama television series, Kalaage Haqqugaa.

Manik next appeared as a sorcerer in Hukuru Vileyrey (2006), co-directed by Aishath Rishmy and Aminath Rasheedha which was based on a novel published by Ibrahim Waheed on Haveeru Daily in 2003. The film was a critical and commercial success while being considered as "one of the few acceptable horror film the Maldivian Film Industry has ever produced". It was later released as 15 episodes television series with inclusion of several clips that were edited off while released in theatre.

In 2008, Manik appeared in a small role in Fathimath Nahula's romantic drama film, Yoosuf which depicts the story of a deaf and mute man (played by Yoosuf Shafeeu) who has been mistreated by a wealthy family, mocking his disability. Featuring an ensemble cast including Yoosuf Shafeeu, Niuma Mohamed, Sheela Najeeb, Ahmed Nimal, Fauziyya Hassan, Ravee Farooq, Zeenath Abbas and Ahmed Lais Asim, the film received widespread critical acclaim and attained blockbuster status at box office.

== Filmography ==
=== Feature film ===
Year	Title	Role	Notes	Ref(s)
1982	Ghaazee Bandaarain	Viyazor		
1983	Funzakham	Adamfulhu		
1984	Majubooru			
1989	Nufolhey Maa	Ibrahim Manik	Also the writer	
1990	Loabi '90	Aashiya's father		
1991	Loabeege Thoofan	Himself	Special appearance	
1992	Nubeehenyaa Kan'daa Hama			
1993	Imthihaan	Doctor	Special appearance	
1993	Beyvafaa	Mohamed's father		
1993	Sitee	Hameed's adoptive father		
1994	Dhevana An'bi	Abdul Ghadir		
1994	Karuna	Adam Manik		
1994	Zakham	Moosafulhu	Also the writer	
1996	Hagu An'bi	Ajuwad		
1996	Fun Asaru	Saleem		
1996	Hifehettumeh Neiy Karuna	Moosabe		
1996	Yatheem			
1996	Edhuvas Hingajje	Kasimfulhu		
1996	Badhal	Moosa Manik		
1996	Huras	Himself	Special appearance	
1997	Loabeege Aniyaa	Sofa's father		
1997	Heelaiy	Thuhthu Seedhi		
1998	Sirru	Thaufeeq		
1998	Ethoofaaneerey	Fayaz's uncle		
2000	Ajaaib	Iburey		
2000	Majubooru Loabi	Shifna's father		
2000	Shaalinee	Moosa Manik		
2000	Zalzalaa	Mudhimbe		
2001	Hithi Nimun	Katheeb		
2002	Loabi Nuvevununama	Adambe		
2003	Araamagu Dhonkamana	Mudhimbe		
2003	Edhi Edhi Hoadheemey	Ahammad		
2004	Hama Himeyn	Zahir		
2005	Hureemey Inthizaarugaa	Mannan		
2006	Hukuru Vileyrey	Adam Manik		
2008	Yoosuf	Adambe		
2010	Dhin Veynuge Hithaamaigaa	Himself	Special appearance in the song "Annaashey Hinithun Velamaa"	

=== Television ===
Year	Title	Role	Notes	Ref(s)
1994	Muhammad Rasul Allah	Pharaoh	Voice-over	
1997–1999	Kahthiri	Ahmed Manik	Also the co-writer Recurring role; 10 episodes	
1998–1999	Aisha	Doctor	Guest role; Episode 3	
2000	Dharifulhu	Teacher	Television film Special appearance	
2002	Fahu Fiyavalhu	Mizna's teacher	Recurring role; 5 episodes	
2003	Ujaalaa Raasthaa	Basheer	Main role; 13 episodes	
2003–2004	Vaisoori	Various roles	3 segments; 16 episodes	
2003–2004	Thiyey Mihithuge Vindhakee	Saeed	Recurring role; 9 episodes	
2004	Vahum	Moosa	Television film	
2004–2005	Loabi Nulibunas	Hussain Saeed	Recurring role; 2 episodes	
2005	Kalaage Haqqugaa	Habeeb	Recurring role	
2005–2006	Fukkashi	Various roles	Main role; 13 episodes	
2005–2006	Kuramey Vadhaaee Salaam	Magistrate	Guest role; "Episode 8"	

=== Short film ===
Year	Title	Role	Notes	Ref(s)
1996	Kolhukehi	Principal		
2009	Pink Fairy	Teacher		

== Accolades ==
Year	Award	Category	Nominated work	Result	Ref(s)
1983	National Award of Recognition	Performing Arts - Theatre performance		Won	
1995	Aafathis Awards – 1995	Best Story	Zakham	Won	
1995	Aafathis Awards – 1995	Best Dialogue	Zakham	Won	
1997	Aafathis Awards – 1996	Best Supporting Actor	Hagu An'bi	Won	
2008	2nd Miadhu Crystal Award	Lifetime Achievement Award		Won	
2009	National Award of Recognition	Performing Arts - Acting		Won	
