= Aminath Shareef =

Maldivian actress

Aminath Shareef is a Maldivian film actress.

== Career ==
Mariyam Shauqee's widely acclaimed family drama television series Kahthiri was released in 1998, where she played the role of the sister of an indolent mother.

In 2005, she collaborated with Arifa Ibrahim for her critically acclaimed television series Vairoalhi Ahves Sirrun which revolves around two best friends involved in extramarital affairs who fail to perform their duties as husband and wife. The show, which also included Lufshan Shakeeb, Ahmed Asim, Aminath Rasheedha, and Mariyam Shakeela, was listed as one of the most successful television series. She then collaborated with Abdul Faththaah for his romantic disaster film, Hureemey Inthizaarugaa (2005) cast along with Ravee Farooq, Mariyam Zuhura, Waleedha Waleed, Ibrahim Jihad and Neena Saleem. The film, heavily reliant on the effect of the 2004 Indian Ocean earthquake on the Maldives, received favorable reviews from critics though it failed to perform financially.

The following year, she again collaborated with the same team, in Ibrahim's new romantic television drama series Vaguthu Faaithu Nuvanees, which follows the story of two best friends who love the same person, unbeknownst to each other. This was followed by her performance as a generous woman in Moomin Fuad and Ali Shifau's critically appreciated crime film Heylaa (2006), which narrates the story of a fourteen years old ambitious boy who finds himself unknowingly being involved in smuggling of a revolver. It was the first Maldivian film to be shot in high-definition digital video. Though the film received positive reviews from critics, it was a commercial failure, where co-director of the film Shifau opined that its commercial status was a result of casting "not very prominent" faces in the film and the "film-goers were not ready to accept the genre" at the time of release.

In 2008, Shareef starred in Fathimath Nahula and Yoosuf Shafeeu-directed television series, Soora (2008), as the mother of a twins who gets separated in a tragic road accident. The following year, she played the role of an underprivileged wife in Amjad Ibrahim's romantic horror film Udhabaani alongside Yoosuf Shafeeu, Hamid Ali and Amira Ismail. Upon release, the film received mixed reviews from critics although it performed well at the box office, making it Ibrahim's most successful venture. She then appeared in a small role as a patient suffering from cardiovascular disease in the Yoosuf Shafeeu-directed Loaiybahtakaa (2009). The romantic drama, co-starring Shafeeu, Sheela Najeeb, Fathimath Fareela and Mohamed Faisal, tells the story of unrequited love, and proved to be a commercial success.

In 2010, Yaaraa Productions released their second film, Fanaa, where she played the role of Athifa, a modern and vibrant middle-aged woman. Based on a novel published by Waheed titled Balgish, the film received mixed to negative response from critics; Ali Naafiz from Haveeru Daily classified the film as one of the worst Maldivian films released during the year.

Her first release of 2011 came in a brief role as Faheema who gets arrested for being allegedly involved in counterfeit dollars business, in the Moomin Fuad-directed crime tragedy drama Loodhifa. Featuring an ensemble cast, the film deals with modern social issues in society told from the different perspectives of the characters. Made on a budget of MVR 600,000, the film was declared a commercial failure though it received wide critical acclaim. She then collaborated with Amjad Ibrahim to play the role of an unsympathetic wife who mistreats her disabled husband in his family drama Hithey Dheymee (2011) which received negative reviews from critics and was a box office failure.

Shareef's only release of 2012 was Abdul Faththaah's romantic film Love Story (2012), starred alongside Ali Seezan, Aishath Rishmy and Amira Ismail. The film and her performance received negative response from critics. Displeased with the screenplay and performance of the actors, Nadheem of Haveeru wrote: "None of the actors were given scope to build their characters and none was able to justify their character. With excessive emotional scenes, actors were exposed to over-acting and nothing more".

== Filmography ==
=== Feature film ===
| Year | Title | Role | Notes | Ref(s) |
|---|---|---|---|---|
| 2005 | Zuleykha | Herself | Special appearance | |
| 2005 | Hureemey Inthizaarugaa | Nasheedha's friend | | |
| 2006 | Hukuru Vileyrey | Nahidha's customer | Special appearance | |
| 2006 | Heylaa | Sobira | | |
| 2006 | Hiyani | Zahid's first wife | Special appearance | |
| 2008 | Yoosuf | Aisthu | | |
| 2009 | Udhabaani | Mariyam Manike | | |
| 2009 | Loaiybahtakaa | Arifa | | |
| 2010 | Dhin Veynuge Hithaamaigaa | Herself | Special appearance in the song "Annaashey Hinithun Velamaa" | |
| 2010 | Fanaa | Athifa | | |
| 2011 | Loodhifa | Faheema | | |
| 2011 | Hithey Dheymee | Fareedha | | |
| 2012 | Love Story | Hana's mother | | |

=== Television ===
| Year | Title | Role | Notes |
|---|---|---|---|
| 1998–1999 | Kahthiri | Jeeza's sister | Recurring role; 4 episodes |
| 2003 | Ujaalaa Raasthaa | Nadhira | Recurring role; 3 episodes |
| 2003–2004 | Vaisoori | Shameema / Abidha | In the segments "Kurin Visnaa Dhevunu Nama" and "An'dhiri Hayaaiy" |
| 2005 | Kalaage Haqqugaa | Zeena's mother | Recurring role; 5 episodes |
| 2005–2006 | Fukkashi | Various roles | Main role; 15 episodes |
| 2005 | Baiveriyaa | Shifana | Main role; 10 episodes |
| 2005–2006 | Vairoalhi Ahves Sirrun | Shah's mother | Recurring role; 52 episodes |
| 2005–2006 | Kuramey Vadhaaee Salaam | Arifa | Main role; 13 episodes |
| 2006–2007 | Vaguthu Faaithu Nuvanees | Shameema | Recurring role; 50 episodes |
| 2007 | Vimlaa | Vimlaa's mother | |
| 2007 | Wafaatheri Nuvevunas | | |
| 2008 | Asarugai | | |
| 2008 | Soora | Riyaz and Niyaz's mother | Main role; 5 episodes |
| 2008 | Umurah Ekee Ulhen Bunefaa | Ramla's mother | |
| 2009 | Mihithah Loabi Dheyshey | Khadheeja | Recurring role; 6 episodes |
| 2010 | Diary | Maleeha | Main role; 4 episodes |
| 2010 | 14 February | Najuma | Main role; 4 episodes |

=== Short film ===
| Year | Title | Role | Notes |
|---|---|---|---|
| 2006 | Mohamma Kalo VS Bao Kalo | Herself | Special appearance |
| 2007 | Ossunu Iraaeku | Aminath | |
| 2007 | Nudhaashe Dhookohfaa Loabivaa | Rasheedha | |
| 2007 | Dhalhamathi | Hawwa | |
| 2007 | Magey Dharifulhu | Jeeza | |
| 2007 | Fahu Sofha | Ibrahim's mother | |
| 2007 | Paneeno | Aminaidhee | |
| 2007 | Badi Edhuru | Hudha's mother | |
| 2008 | Noonekey Nubunaashey | Naseem's mother | |
| 2009 | Beyinsaafu | Ruqiyya | |
| 2009 | Lhakoe | Haseena | |
| 2009 | Dhekunu Huvafen | Ayaz's mother | |
| 2010 | Lollypop | Kaiydhaitha | |
| 2010 | Fahun Rangalhuvaane 2 | Dhon Sihthi | |
