= Hureemey Inthizaarugaa =

2005 Maldivian romantic drama film

- Official film poster
- Directed by: Abdul Faththaah
- Written by: Mahdi Ahmed
- Screenplay by: Mahdi Ahmed
- Produced by: Malla Ahmed Nasir; Ahmed Arif
- Starring: Ravee Farooq; Mariyam Zuhura; Waleedha Waleed
- Cinematography: Ibrahim Moosa
- Edited by: Abdul Faththaah; Mohamed Amsad
- Music by: Ibrahim Nifar
- Production company: Apollo Entertainments
- Release date: September 6, 2005
- Country: Maldives
- Language: Dhivehi

Hureemey Inthizaarugaa (English translation: I waited) is a 2005 Maldivian romantic drama film directed by Abdul Faththaah. Co-produced by Malla Ahmed Nasir and Ahmed Arif under Apollo Entertainments, the film stars Ravee Farooq, Mariyam Zuhura and Waleedha Waleed in pivotal roles. The film was heavily relied on the effect of the 2004 Indian Ocean earthquake on the Maldives.

== Plotline ==
Shafiu (Ravee Farooq), who was adopted in childhood and the most beloved son in his family, visits an island for a survey and meets Reena (Mariyam Zuhura) with whom he connects after several quarrels in prior meetings. Shafiu marries Reena and is blessed with two children. Before his adoptive father Qafoor's death, he was willed to be promoted as the company head and sole owner of his property. However, upon his death, Shafiu's brother, Ubaid (Ibrahim Jihad), strips him of all of his power, throws his family out of the house and fires him from his post at the company. Until Shafiu finds a decent job and settles in, Reena goes to her island with their children while Shafiu has an extramarital affair with a rich older woman, Nasheedha (Waleedha Waleed).

== Cast ==
- Ravee Farooq as Shafiu
- Mariyam Zuhura as Reena
- Waleedha Waleed as Nasheedha
- Ibrahim Jihad as Ubaid
- Nadhiya Hassan as Muna; Reena's best friend
- Fauziyya Hassan as Manike; Reena's mother
- Chilhiya Moosa Manik as Mannan; Reena's father
- Mohamed Faisal as Fakhir
- Satthar Ibrahim Manik as Office Boss
- Ibrahim Wisan as a company staff
- Aminath Shareef as Nasheedha's friend
- Neena Saleem as Aishath Shirmeena
- Fathimath Fareela (special appearance in the item song "Bunedheyshey Mithura")

== Soundtrack ==
Track listing
No.	Title	Lyrics	Singer(s)	Length
1.	"Miadhu Ulhunas Mithaa"	Easa Shareef	Mukhthar Adam, Shifa Thaufeeq
2.	"Behidhaane Hiyy Hama"	Easa Shareef	Fazeela Amir
3.	"Visnaa Visnaa"	Easa Shareef	Abdul Baaree, Shifa Thaufeeq
4.	"Ma Dhuru Nuvaanan"	Easa Shareef	Shifa Thaufeeq, Mohamed Abdul Ghanee
5.	"Loabi Aavey"	Easa Shareef	Shifa Thaufeeq, Mukhthar Adam
6.	"Bunedheyshey Mithura"	Easa Shareef	Mariyam Unoosha, Mukhthar Adam
7.	"Haadhahaa Fariyey Thi Harakaaiy"	Easa Shareef	Mukhthar Adam
8.	"Maaiy Kalaakoaey Mi Loabeege"	Easa Shareef	Mukhthar Adam

== Accolades ==
Year	Award	Category	Recipients	Result	Ref.
2007	1st Miadhu Crystal Awards	Best Newcomer (Male)	Ravee Farooq	Won	
