= Ujaalaa Raasthaa =

Maldivian television series

- Screenplay by: Ibrahim Waheed; Ibrahim Rasheed
- Story by: Ibrahim Waheed; Ibrahim Rasheed
- Directed by: Mohamed Shareef; Muawiyath Anwar
- Music by: Mohamed Ikram
- Country of origin: Maldives
- Original language: Dhivehi
- No. of seasons: 1
- No. of episodes: 13

Production
- Executive producer: Mariyam Shauqee
- Cinematography: Hussain Imthiyaz; Iyad Ali
- Running time: 24-33 minutes

Original release
- Release: October 7 – December 30, 2003

Ujaalaa Raasthaa is a Maldivian television series developed for Television Maldives in association with UNFPA. Directed by Mohamed Shareef and Muawiyath Anwar, the series narrates the journey of two best friends in three generations. The series developed as an attempt to aware the audience on several social issues, was widely accepted by the audience and received positive reviews from critics.

== Cast ==
=== Main ===
- Zeenath Abbas as Ameena Adam
- Ahmed Saeed as Afsal
- Ali Shameel as Adamfulhu
- Hussain Nooradeen as Khalid
- Thahumeena Rasheed as Zuleikha
- Ahmed Asim as Majid
- Ahmed Azmeel as Adheel
- Chilhiya Moosa Manik as Basheer
- Hassan Afeef as Hussain Manik
- Aminath Rasheedha as Sobira; Afsal's mother
- Hawwa Sana as child Ameena Adam
- Naza Adam as child Sithura

=== Recurring ===
- Mariyam Suza as young Ameena Adam
- Nazeema as young Sithura
- Mariyam Zuhura as Wadheefa; Basheer's daughter
- Abdulla Muaz as Asim
- Aminath Shareef as Nadhira
- Ismail Shifan
- Yaameen Rasheed
- Abdul Shamaam
- Shareefa Moosa
- Fathimath Nazeeha as Zahira
- Fathimath Latha
- Fathimath Arifa
- Rilwan Rasheed
- Ahmed Shuhad
- Ibrahim Manik
- Abdul Rahman Ibrahim

=== Guest ===
- Sameema as Asma; Adamfulhu's wife

== Episodes ==
No. in season	Title	Directed by	Edited by
1	"Episode 1"	Mohamed Shareef, Muawiyath Anwar	Ahmed Mohamed
Ameena (Hawwa Sana) and Sithura (Naza Adam) are childhood best friends, where the former aspires to become a doctor while the latter is ambitious to become a teacher. However, Ameena's career plans are restricted due to her short-minded father, Adamfulhu (Ali Shameel) who believes in gender inequality. Meanwhile, Sithura has her period and her helpless mother fails to educate her on the subject.
2	"Episode 2"	Muawiyath Anwar	Muawiyath Anwar
Ameena has a bad stomach ache which was later revealed to be a sign of her first period. Similar to Sithura's situation, Ameena's mother, Zuleikha take the subject lightly though her elder sister, Zahira educates her regarding the matter. Later, realizing her lack of awareness, Zuleikha educates Ameena on the impact of menstruation on her behavior. Zahira is married to a short-tempered husband, Hussain Manik (Hassan Afeef) and suffers an abusive marriage.
3	"Episode 3"	Mohamed Shareef, Muawiyath Anwar	Muawiyath Anwar
Sithura is sexually abused by her step-father, unbeknownst to her mother. Adamfulhu's brother, Basheer (Chilhiya Moosa Manik) is concerned about his modern daughter, Wadheefa (Mariyam Zuhura).
4	"Episode 4"	Muawiyath Anwar	Muawiyath Anwar
Ameena and Sithura, now in their youth, still remain as close friends. Sithura's mother defends her husband and warns Sithura not to utter a word about her abuse. Hussain Manik is disturbed to realize that the law allows wives to seek divorce from their husbands. Adamfulhu ultimately decides to send Ameena to Male' for further studies.
5	"Episode 5"	Muawiyath Anwar	Muawiyath Anwar
Years later, Ameena (Zeenath Abbas), now an adult, resides in Male' to continue further studies. The dominating husband, Hussain Manik, acts like a repent man who is afraid of losing his wife.
6	"Episode 6"	Muawiyath Anwar	Muawiyath Anwar
Zahira is finally free from the clutches of Hussain Manik. Having no end to the sexual abuse of her step-father, Sithura reveals every details to Ameena.
7	"Episode 7"	Muawiyath Anwar	Muawiyath Anwar
Ameena returns to her island after completing her O'Level education. A shopkeeper of the island, Khalid (Hussain Nooradeen), who has been after Ameena since her childhood, decides to ask to marry him. He brings forth the marriage proposal which she instantly rejects.
8	"Episode 8"	Muawiyath Anwar	Muawiyath Anwar
Ameena seeks help from her uncle, Basheer, to save Sithura from her sufferings. He reveals everything to her mother, Abdiha, and offers a helping hand if deemed necessary. She catches her husband, Wafir, red-handed in action and leaves him for good. He is then jailed for three years. Hussain Manik, guilty of all his actions try to reconcile with Zahhira.
9	"Episode 9"	Muawiyath Anwar	Muawiyath Anwar
Majid has a difference of opinion with his wife, Azma, on whom to be the stay home parent. After discussing with his siblings Ameena and Adheel, he made his decision to hunt for a job offering better salary. After months of hope, Afsal finally meets Ameena and they continue dating after he impresses Ameena with her question on gender inequality. Khalid starts spreading misleading information about Ameena to Afsal's family.
10	"Episode 10"	Muawiyath Anwar	Muawiyath Anwar
Azma gives birth to a healthy child. Ameena and Afsal gets married and she moves to his house where his mother, Sobira, affected by Khalid's conversation is determined to spice up their marriage.
11	"Episode 11"	Muawiyath Anwar	Muawiyath Anwar
Sobira, displeased to see her son taking part in the daily household chores, tries every possible way to separate the couple. As none of these options seem to have any negative impact on their relationship, she ultimately asks him to choose between his wife and his mother.
12	"Episode 12"	Muawiyath Anwar	Muawiyath Anwar
The family conversation leads to a change of heart for Sobira and they share an emotional reunion. Meanwhile Majidha and Azma shares a healthy relationship where they both work and take care of their child. Sobira has a difference of opinion regarding the course Sobira has been admitted in abroad.
13	"Episode 13"	Muawiyath Anwar	Muawiyath Anwar
Sithura, now an empowered woman and married to Zameer, finally starts defending herself and agrees to attend sessions of a psychiatrist as she is unable to fulfil her husbands desire in bed. Ameena family supports her in her educational plan. Adheel graduates from his course with flying colors.

== Reception ==
Upon release, the series was met with positive reviews from critics, for the director and screenwriters work to present several moral values in an attractive way and touching several taboo topics for a mainstream release including, mensuration, sexual abuse within family, domestic abuse by husband, gender inequality and discrimination to name a few. Having similarities with the anthology series Vaisoori, directed by Arifa Ibrahim and released in 2003, the series was included in the "must watch television productions" in Maldives.
