= Baiveriyaa (TV series) =

Maldivian TV series

- Written by: Ibrahim Waheed; Ibrahim Rasheed; Fathimath Nahula
- Directed by: Mohamed Shareef
- Music by: Mohamed Ikram
- Country of origin: Maldives
- Original language: Divehi
- No. of seasons: 1
- No. of episodes: 14

Production
- Cinematography: Iyad Ali; Ahmed Athoof
- Editors: Ahmed Irushan; Aswad Najeeb; Ahmed Imad; Ahmed Zufar
- Running time: 27-33 minutes

Original release
- Release: 2005

Baiveriyaa is Maldivian romantic drama television series directed by Mohamed Shareef. Developed by Television Maldives in association with UNFPA, it stars Yoosuf Shafeeu, Niuma Mohamed, Khadheeja Ibrahim Didi, Ali Seezan and Aminath Rishfa in main roles.

== Cast and characters ==
=== Main ===
- Yoosuf Shafeeu as Adheel
- Niuma Mohamed as Nuzha
- Adam Naseer as Zahid
- Aminath Rasheedha as Fareedha
- Aminath Rishfa as Yumna
- Ali Seezan as Rayaan
- Ibrahim Rasheed as Husnee
- Hussain Nooradeen as Badhuru
- Fauziyya Hassan as Nazeera
- Zuleikha Abdul Latheef as Ramla
- Khadheeja Ibrahim Didi as Leena
- Aminath Shareef as Shifana

=== Recurring ===
- Hassan Afeef as Badheeu
- Husnee Ahmed as Arif
- Abdulla Muaz as Naseeh
- Nashidha Mohamed as Zulfa
- Mariyam Zuhura as Rishfa
- Hamid Ali as Amir
- Shimla Mahir as Zumra

=== Guest ===
- Hamdhan Farooq as gym member (Episode 1)
- Azim as doctor (Episode 3)
- Mohamed Faisal as Yasir (Episode 10)
- Satthar Ibrahim Manik as Rayaan's father (Episode 10)
- Arifa Ibrahim as Faheema's friend (Episode 10)
- Moosa Zakariyya as Nuzuha's stalker (Episode 11)

== Episodes ==
No. in season	Title	Written by
1	"Episode 1"	Ibrahim Waheed
Adheel (Yoosuf Shafeeu) and Nuzha (Niuma Mohamed) are school friends who lately started growing fondness towards each other. Husnee (Ibrahim Rasheed), the husband of Nuzha's sister, Nazeera (Fauziyya Hassan) and Zahid (Adam Naseer), father of Adheel discuss to extend their business relationship by arranging the marriage of their children. Adheel's younger sister, Yumna (Aminath Rishfa) deals with a heart break. Meanwhile, Zulfa (Nashidha Mohamed) desperately asks Badhuru (Hussain Nooradeen) to marry her, which he respectfully requests to postpone since he feels Zulfa is yet too immature for marriage.
2	"Episode 2"	Ibrahim Waheed, Fathimath Nahula
Nuzha's subordinate, Ramla (Zuleikha Abdul Latheef) faces extra pressure at work while struggling to manage her personal life with her irresponsible, abusive husband, Badheeu (Hassan Afeef). The opposite is shown with the relationship of the impoverished couple, Amir (Hamid Ali) and Zumra (Shimla Mahir), where the husband is extremely caring towards his wife though the couple lack the awareness of birth control. Nazeera advises Nuzha to be very cautious at work as her reputation and work ethics play an important role in her marriage plans. Nuzha and Adheel is concerned about their friend, Naseeh (Abdulla Muaz), an athlete turned drug addict.
3	"Episode 3"	Fathimath Nahula
Leena (Khadheeja Ibrahim Didi), a school teacher, reminisces her childhood of how she grew up with the lack of affection from a father. Her mother, Shifana (Aminath Shareef) is a strong and empowered woman who manages her own business through delegation. Yumna's parents, Zahid (Adam Naseer) and Faheema (Aminath Rasheedha) educate their immature child on relationship tips. Amir and Zumra discuss on some birth control methods.
4	"Episode 4"	Fathimath Nahula
Adheel’s childhood friend, Rayaan (Ali Seezan) catches the attention of Yumna, who also conveys similar feelings towards him. Nazeera is constantly depressed for failing to satisfy her husband’s dreams of having a baby of their own.
5	"Episode 5"	Fathimath Nahula
Rayaan proposes to Yumna and she decided to "play hard to get" as instructed by her father. Noting that Zumra has carried enough burden for the family, Amir decided to get sterile himself, much to Zumra's pleasant surprise. Shifana has a hard time coping up with the loss in her business as one of the ships gets damaged in a shipwreck. This is celebrated as a long term accomplishment by Husnee, which creates discomfort and wariness to Nazeera.
6	"Episode 6"	Ibrahim Rasheed
As a token of sympathy, Husnee offers Leena an administrative job in Male' with benefits including accommodation and financing her study expenses, which she fondly accepts. Adheel visits her island as a sports coach and is mesmerized by Leena's beauty, much to the discomfort of Amir, who has a secret crush on her but too reluctant to disclose his feelings. Soon after, Nuzha proposes to Adheel but he insists them to limit their friendship as close friends. Fareedha and Zahid conveys their acceptance to their daughter's relationship with Rayaan.
7	"Episode 7"	Ibrahim Rasheed
Leena is introduced to the colleagues and her presence in the office was acknowledged as a pleasant surprise by Adheel, which results in Nuzha feeling distressed with a twinge of envy for Leena. Ramla is diagnosed with a sexually transmitted disease. Rayaan and Yumna finally decide to tie the knot and their family along with them initiate the marriage plans, while Nuzha implants fabricated stories in the mind of Rayaan against Yumna.
8	"Episode 8"	Ibrahim Rasheed
Rayaan breaks up with Yumna and calls off the wedding. Slowly, Nuzha starts attacking Leena who brings it to the attention of Adheel. After a conversation with a friend, Badheeu has a change of heart who repents to take the full responsibility of a husband which Ramla lacked in her married life.
9	"Episode 9"	Ibrahim Rasheed
Adheel confronts Nuzha with regard to her involvement in the break up of Rayaan and Yumna's relationship. Leena feels threatened and annoyed at workplace due to the continuous interference by Nuzha. Adheel and Husnee clears the doubts and suspicions of Rayaan.
10	"Episode 10"	Ibrahim Waheed
Rayaan apologizes to Yumna, but she initially refused to get back with him. Nazeera suspects that Husnee is having an extramarital affair with Leena, to which he responded that he treats Leena like a daughter of his own. Frustrated, Nazeera assists Nuzha in developing a masterplan to eliminate Leena from their lives.
11	"Episode 11"	Ibrahim Waheed
Rayaan marries Yumna. The news of Leena's marriage plans with Adheel breaks Arif's heart and he warns Shifana it as a catastrophe in the future, who further informs Leena to immediately return to her island. Meanwhile, Adheel introduces Leena to the family who impresses Faheema with her simplicity.
12	"Episode 12"	Ibrahim Waheed
Nuzuha has high hopes with her plans as Leena decides to relocate to her island, hoping she can get the attention of Adheel. Husnee arranges Shifana to come Male' and stay with her daughter until she completes her studies.
13	"Episode 13"	Ibrahim Waheed
Leena confronts Arif with regard to his fabricated stories on Adheel. Husnee visits Shifana and the latter grumbles for Husnee's irresponsibility as a husband and father. Leena eavesdrops the conversation and realizes the truth behind his welfare.
14	"Episode 14"	Ibrahim Waheed
Nazeera considers accepting Leena while Nuzuha refuses to make peace with her. However, Husnee succeeds in knocking some sense into their head and they finally decide to get along with Leena in peace.

== Soundtrack ==
Track listing
No.	Title	Singer(s)	Length
1.	"Baiveriyaa Kuramey Handhaan"	Shifa Thaufeeq

== Response ==
Upon release, the series received mainly positive reviews from critics and audience, where the writing, direction and performance of the actors were highlighted.
