= Vaisoori =

Television series

- Opening title sequence
- Screenplay by: Arifa Ibrahim
- Directed by: Arifa Ibrahim
- Music by: Mohamed Shahuban
- Country of origin: Maldives
- Original language: Dhivehi
- No. of seasons: 1
- No. of episodes: 52

Production
- Running time: 24-29 minutes

Original release
- Release: 2003 – 2004

Vaisoori is a Maldivian anthology television series directed by Arifa Ibrahim. Originally aired from 2003 to 2004 on the channel Television Maldives, the series was developed as a 52-episodes series consisting of ten segments.

The longest running segment from the series, "An'dhiri Hayaaiy" consists of 33 episodes and stars Ali Shameel, Nooma Ibrahim, Niuma Mohamed, Ahmed Asim, Aminath Rishfa, Mariyam Sheleen and Sheereen Abdul Wahid in main roles. This segment narrates the downturn of an only child in the family for choosing a path her parents disapproves. This is followed by the segment "Kurin Visnaa Dhevunu Nama", consisting of 9 episodes, which follows the life of a disobedient girl played by Hawwa Enee. The segment "Namoonaa Akah Vaasheve!" was split into three episodes, while "Ih'thiraam Hoadhavaa" was released as two episodes. Rest of the segments were released as a single episode.

== Episodes ==
No. in season	Title	Directed by	Written by	Camera by	Edited by
1	"Azum"	Arifa Ibrahim	Mariyam Moosa	Ibrahim Iyad	Ahmed Imad
Yooha and Aisha are two classmates who are poles apart in their personalities, where the former is a spoiled child who exhibit behavioral problems while the latter is an acquiescent girl who wholeheartedly accepts all the shortcomings. Despite several efforts by Yooha's father Waheed, Naseema's over pampering of their daughter encourages Yooha until Waheed's life is at stake. Cast : Maai as Yooha, Dhafeen as Aisha, Ali Shameel as Waheed, Aminath Rasheedha as Naseema, Ahmed Saeed as Hameed, Sifana as Waleedha
2	"Sama Aai Neena"	Arifa Ibrahim	Mariyam Moosa	Ibrahim Iyad, Mohamed Abdul Ghafoor, Abdul Latheef	Ahmed Imad
Sama and Neena are two identical twins separated as babies and raised apart. The twins reunite during their primary education, unbeknownst to each other. An unfortunate condition gathers the whole family together where the parents reveal their identity and finally accept as a family. Cast : Naza as Sama / Neena, Aminath Rasheedha as Ashiya, Ali Shameel as Farish, Aishath Rasheedha as Ashiya's sister, Samiya as Aneesa, Mohamed Faisal as a teacher
3	"Loaiybaa Eku"	Arifa Ibrahim	Aminath Sheneen	Iyad Ali, Mohamed Abdul Ghafoor	Ahmed Mohamed
Zahidha dies while giving birth to Aisha. Ever since, her father, Ziyad blames his child for his misfortune. Ziyad decides to marry another woman and is forced to send Aisha to his homeland. On her birthday, he reads a letter of Aisha which fills him with grief and begs for her forgiveness leading to an emotional reunion. Cast : Hassan Afeef as Ziyad, Aminath Ahmed Didi as Ziyad's mother, Samha as Aisha, Ahmed Saeed as doctor, Waleedha Waleed as Zahidha, Naza as Rashfa
4	"Thedhuveri Kamuge Hadhiya"	Arifa Ibrahim	Ibrahim Waheed	Iyad Ali, Mohamed Abdul Ghafoor, Mohamed Imthiyaz	Ahmed Mohamed
Adhuham finds a lost wallet and uses the money in it to reimburse for his demands, from cheating in examination to bribing his intelligent sister, Madheeha to cover for him. Everything was working in favor of him until he loses the wallet and his father demands to return it instantly. Cast : Yaamin as Adhuham, Hulwa as Madheeha, Ali Shameel as Rasheed, Shafaza as Adhuham's mother, Mohamed Faisal as Azeez
5	"Thafaathu"	Arifa Ibrahim	Aminath Sheneen	Iyad Ali	Ahmed Mohamed
The episode focuses on the discrimination between a son and daughter in the same family in terms of education and family rights, and how the siblings voice to provide equal opportunities to them regardless of their gender. Cast : Ali Nasru, Niuma Abdul Razzaq as Mizu, Mohamed Waheed as Haleem, Aminath Rasheedha as Aneesa, Mohamed Faisal as a teacher
6	"Kurin Visnaa Dhevunu Nama.. (Part 1)"	Arifa Ibrahim	Shareefa Fakhry	Mohamed Abdul Ghafoor, Abdulla Shameel	Ahmed Mohamed, Mohamed Jinah, Aswad Najeeb
Fazna is a disobedient and mindful daughter who makes her own rules in the house. While her parents are busy with their daily chores, Fazna goes behind their back from avoiding school to seeking help from older men. Cast : Hawwa Enee as Fazna, Waleedha Waleed as Fareedha, Hassan Afeef as Naeem, Ali Shameel as Shareef, Amira Ismail as Aroosha, Nooma Ibrahim as Ameena, Aishath Haleem as Nashfa
7	"Kurin Visnaa Dhevunu Nama.. (Part 2)"	Arifa Ibrahim	Shareefa Fakhry	Mohamed Abdul Ghafoor, Abdulla Shameel	Ahmed Mohamed, Mohamed Jinah, Aswad Najeeb
Fazna, with the help of Naeem, attempts to forge a medical certificate which is required by her school for not attending her final exams. Cast : Hawwa Enee as Fazna, Waleedha Waleed as Fareedha, Hassan Afeef as Naeem, Ali Shameel as Shareef, Amira Ismail as Aroosha, Nooma Ibrahim as Ameena, Aishath Haleem as Nashfa, Mohamed Faisal as Shirufan
8	"Kurin Visnaa Dhevunu Nama.. (Part 3)"	Arifa Ibrahim	Shareefa Fakhry	Mohamed Abdul Ghafoor	Aswad Najeeb
Fareedha confronts Fazna about her relationship with Naeem while Shareef takes the matter lightly. Fazna consults a doctor hoping to fake a medical certificate though the doctor asks her to observe some medical tests. Cast : Hawwa Enee as Fazna, Waleedha Waleed as Fareedha, Hassan Afeef as Naeem, Ali Shameel as Shareef, Amira Ismail as Aroosha, Nooma Ibrahim as Ameena, Aishath Haleem as Nashfa, Mohamed Faisal as Shirufan
9	"Kurin Visnaa Dhevunu Nama.. (Part 4)"	Arifa Ibrahim	Shareefa Fakhry	Mohamed Abdul Ghafoor	Aswad Najeeb
Shareef scolds Fazna for not attending Fareedha in her sick bed. The medical tests show Fazna's health condition as normal but the doctor issues a medical certificate on the promise that she will repend in future. Cast : Hawwa Enee as Fazna, Waleedha Waleed as Fareedha, Hassan Afeef as Naeem, Ali Shameel as Shareef, Amira Ismail as Aroosha, Nooma Ibrahim as Ameena, Aishath Haleem as Nashfa, Mohamed Faisal as Shirufan
10	"Kurin Visnaa Dhevunu Nama.. (Part 5)"	Arifa Ibrahim	Shareefa Fakhry	Mohamed Abdul Ghafoor, Ibrahim Rifau	Aswad Najeeb
Aroosha confronts Naeem about his relationship with Fazna. Cast : Hawwa Enee as Fazna, Waleedha Waleed as Fareedha, Hassan Afeef as Naeem, Ali Shameel as Shareef, Amira Ismail as Aroosha, Nooma Ibrahim as Ameena, Aishath Haleem as Nashfa, Mohamed Faisal as Shirufan, Aminath Shareef as Shameema, Ahmed Asim as Shafraz, Ahmed Azim as Aroosha's father
11	"Kurin Visnaa Dhevunu Nama.. (Part 6)"	Arifa Ibrahim	Shareefa Fakhry	Mohamed Abdul Ghafoor	Aswad Najeeb
Upon submitting the medical certificate, the school committee decides that Fazna has to resit for the exam. Shareef figures out that she dumps school and is lying to the family. Fazna unfolds to Aroosha her childhood trauma which led to her current situation. Cast : Hawwa Enee as Fazna, Waleedha Waleed as Fareedha, Hassan Afeef as Naeem, Ali Shameel as Shareef, Amira Ismail as Aroosha, Nooma Ibrahim as Ameena, Aishath Haleem as Nashfa, Sameema as Ainth, Chilhiya Moosa Manik as Fazna's grandfather
12	"Kurin Visnaa Dhevunu Nama.. (Part 7)"	Arifa Ibrahim	Shareefa Fakhry	Mohamed Abdul Ghafoor	Aswad Najeeb
Failed in all her exams, Fazna is dropped from school. Furious, Fareedha throws her out of the house. Fazna's sister, Farusha returns from abroad after completing her studies. Farusha and her adoptive mother, Sheereen, counsels her parents about their relationship and weak parental skills. Cast : Hawwa Enee as Fazna, Niuma Mohamed as Fareedha, Hassan Afeef as Naeem, Ali Shameel as Shareef, Amira Ismail as Aroosha, Nooma Ibrahim as Ameena, Aishath Haleem as Nashfa, Sameema as Ainth, Fauziyya Hassan as Fazna's grandmother, Aminath Rishfa as Farusha, Sakeena as Nashfa's mother, Aminath Rasheedha as Sheereen
13	"Kurin Visnaa Dhevunu Nama.. (Part 8)"	Arifa Ibrahim	Shareefa Fakhry	Mohamed Abdul Ghafoor	Aswad Najeeb
The family has an emotional reunion where Fazna agrees to move back to her family. Cast : Hawwa Enee as Fazna, Niuma Mohamed as Fareedha, Hassan Afeef as Naeem, Ali Shameel as Shareef, Amira Ismail as Aroosha, Nooma Ibrahim as Ameena, Aishath Haleem as Nashfa, Fauziyya Hassan as Fazna's grandmother, Aminath Rishfa as Farusha
14	"Heyo Amalu"	Arifa Ibrahim	Ibrahim Waheed	Abdul Latheef, Mohamed Abdul Ghafoor	Aswad Najeeb
Moosa and Ruqiyya are two siblings, where the former is a carefree, ambitionless child and the latter is a more thoughtful and helpful child. In order to compensate for Ruqiyya's lost school shoes, the siblings decide to share Moosa's shoes by switching them during their session break. Hesitant to reveal the truth to their parents, the sibling start working to earn money and buy a pair shoes on their own. Ruqiyya lends their hard earned savings to a blind orphan which later resulted in a positive return. Cast : Ismail as Moosa, Naza Adam as Ruqiyya, Aminath Rasheedha as children's mother, Ali Shameel as children's father
15	"Ih'thiraam Hoadhavaa (Part 1)"	Arifa Ibrahim	Mariyam Moosa	Mohamed Abdul Ghafoor	Ahmed Mohamed, Hassan Nishath
Athiga acts like the adult in the home, while her step-mother, Faheema is the indolent cinephilia who avoids all her responsibilities. Cast : Afnan as Athiga, Aminath Rasheedha as Faheema, Ali Shameel as Ahmed, Suneetha Ali as Aisthu
16	"Ih'thiraam Hoadhavaa (Part 2)"	Arifa Ibrahim	Mariyam Moosa	Mohamed Abdul Ghafoor	Ahmed Mohamed, Hassan Nishath
Athiga helps Aisthu in doing all the household chores and perform several other work to help her step-mother. During the despair time of Aisthu for losing her grandmother, Athiga becomes the consistent helping hand. Meanwhile, Faheema, realizing Athiga's affection towards her, finally returns empathy and affection towards her. Cast : Afnan as Athiga, Aminath Rasheedha as Faheema, Ali Shameel as Ahmed, Suneetha Ali as Aisthu, Fauziyya Hassan as Aisthu's grandmother, Mohamed Faisal as Aisthu's brother, Nooma Ibrahim as Athiga's mother
17	"Namoonaa Akah Vaasheve! (Part 1)"	Arifa Ibrahim	Mariyam Moosa	Mohamed Abdul Ghafoor	Ahmed Mohamed
Naaif is a slothful and greedy brother who mocks other at any chance including his brother, mother and teacher, while his younger brother, Naail is the obliging and religious child in the family. Cast : Zimam as Naaif, Naail as Naail, Khadheeja Ibrahim Didi as Seema, Mohamed Faisal as Reehaan, Chilhiya Moosa Manik as Easa
18	"Namoonaa Akah Vaasheve! (Part 2)"	Arifa Ibrahim	Mariyam Moosa	Mohamed Abdul Ghafoor	Ahmed Mohamed
Despite several efforts by the family, Naaif's behavior remains unchanged. His moments of echolalia becomes a constant disturbance to the school and family environment. Cast : Zimam as Naaif, Naail as Naail, Khadheeja Ibrahim Didi as Seema, Mohamed Faisal as Reehaan, Chilhiya Moosa Manik as Easa, Nooma Ibrahim as Reena, Shafaza as Teacher
19	"Namoonaa Akah Vaasheve! (Part 3)"	Arifa Ibrahim	Mariyam Moosa	Mohamed Abdul Ghafoor	Ahmed Mohamed
Naail sacrifices all his happiness for the sake of his brother. During a family picnic trip, Naaif falls from a tree and becomes handicapped which triggers him about his weakness and loneliness. It was then he decided to follow his brother's path. Cast : Zimam as Naaif, Naail as Naail, Khadheeja Ibrahim Didi as Seema, Mohamed Faisal as Reehaan, Chilhiya Moosa Manik as Easa, Nooma Ibrahim as Reena
20	"An'dhiri Hayaaiy (Part 1)"	Arifa Ibrahim	Shareefa Fakhry	Mohamed Abdul Ghafoor, Mohamed Shiyaz	Aswad Najeeb
Saara is the blind daughter of Shameel and Aneesa, whose helpless condition has been the constant dilemma in the family. Unable to fully understand and aid her, Aneesa's sister, Afeefa aware the parents on counseling to assist their child live a more independent life. Cast : Ali Shameel as Sharumeel, Nooma Ibrahim as Aneesa, Niuma Mohamed as Afeefa, Mariyam Sheleen as Saara, Mujthaba as Shamin, Sameema as Shameema
21	"An'dhiri Hayaaiy (Part 2)"	Arifa Ibrahim	Shareefa Fakhry	Mohamed Abdul Ghafoor, Mohamed Shiyaz	Aswad Najeeb
Afeefa introduces the counseller Leesha to the family and hopes to bring progress to Sara slowly in time. The family responds to her politely while Shameema seems a little reluctant in her part of assistance. Cast : Ali Shameel as Sharumeel, Nooma Ibrahim as Aneesa, Niuma Mohamed as Afeefa, Mariyam Sheleen as Saara, Mujthaba as Shamin, Sameema as Shameema, Sheereen Abdul Wahid as Leesha
22	"An'dhiri Hayaaiy (Part 3)"	Arifa Ibrahim	Shareefa Fakhry	Mohamed Abdul Ghafoor, Mohamed Shiyaz	Aswad Najeeb
To the surprise of the whole family, Sameema shows affection towards Saara and teachers her to pray. Afeefa's abusive husband, Siraj returns creating troubles in her life. Cast : Ali Shameel as Sharumeel, Nooma Ibrahim as Aneesa, Niuma Mohamed as Afeefa, Mariyam Sheleen as Saara, Mujthaba as Shamin, Sameema as Shameema, Sheereen Abdul Wahid as Leesha, Ahmed Asim as Siraj
23	"An'dhiri Hayaaiy (Part 4)"	Arifa Ibrahim	Shareefa Fakhry	Mohamed Abdul Ghafoor, Mohamed Shiyaz	Aswad Najeeb
Afeefa suspects Siraj is having an affair with another woman. Saara shows a major improvement in her life skills. Cast : Ali Shameel as Sharumeel, Nooma Ibrahim as Aneesa, Niuma Mohamed as Afeefa, Mariyam Sheleen as Saara, Mujthaba as Shamin, Sameema as Shameema, Sheereen Abdul Wahid as Leesha, Ahmed Asim as Siraj
24	"An'dhiri Hayaaiy (Part 5)"	Arifa Ibrahim	Shareefa Fakhry	Mohamed Abdul Ghafoor, Mohamed Shiyaz	Aswad Najeeb
Afeefa narrates her past to Leesha, on how she met Siraj while she was a student and how he pampers her with his gratitude of love. Cast : Ali Shameel as Sharumeel, Nooma Ibrahim as Aneesa, Niuma Mohamed as Afeefa, Mariyam Sheleen as Saara, Mujthaba as Shamin, Sameema as Shameema, Sheereen Abdul Wahid as Leesha, Ahmed Asim as Siraj, Chilhiya Moosa Manik as Shakir, Aminath Shareef as Abidha, Shaman as Haleem
25	"An'dhiri Hayaaiy (Part 6)"	Arifa Ibrahim	Shareefa Fakhry	Mohamed Abdul Ghafoor, Mohamed Shiyaz	Aswad Najeeb
On Siraj's birthday, Afeefa lies to her parent about her whereabouts and secretly meets him, only to bumps into Shrumeel on her way back to home. Cast : Ali Shameel as Sharumeel, Nooma Ibrahim as Aneesa, Niuma Mohamed as Afeefa, Mariyam Sheleen as Saara, Ahmed Asim as Siraj, Chilhiya Moosa Manik as Shakir, Aminath Shareef as Abidha, Shaman as Haleem
26	"An'dhiri Hayaaiy (Part 7)"	Arifa Ibrahim	Shareefa Fakhry	Mohamed Abdul Ghafoor, Mohamed Shiyaz	Aswad Najeeb
Afeefa lies to Sharumeel saying she got stuck at airport. However, their private affair is shortly exposed to Afeefa's father who forbids their relationship as he is aware of Siraj's reality. Cast : Ali Shameel as Sharumeel, Nooma Ibrahim as Aneesa, Niuma Mohamed as Afeefa, Mariyam Sheleen as Saara, Ahmed Asim as Siraj, Chilhiya Moosa Manik as Shakir, Aminath Shareef as Abidha, Sameema as Shameema, Ahmed Azmeel as Nashid, Mujthaba as Shamin
27	"An'dhiri Hayaaiy (Part 8)"	Arifa Ibrahim	Shareefa Fakhry	Mohamed Abdul Ghafoor, Mohamed Shiyaz	Aswad Najeeb
In a flashback it is revealed that Shakir was fired from his job as a cashier when Siraj accuses him of theft. Afeefa decides to severe her ties with him though Siraj convinces her of otherwise. Cast : Ali Shameel as Sharumeel, Nooma Ibrahim as Aneesa, Niuma Mohamed as Afeefa, Mariyam Sheleen as Saara, Ahmed Asim as Siraj, Chilhiya Moosa Manik as Shakir, Aminath Shareef as Abidha, Shaman as Haleem, Ahmed Azmeel as Nashid, Mujthaba as Shamin
28	"Andhiri Hayaaiy (Part 9)"	Arifa Ibrahim	Shareefa Fakhry	Mohamed Abdul Ghafoor, Mohamed Shiyaz	Aswad Najeeb
Afeefa decides to move ahead with her relationship with Siraj despite her parents' disapproval. Siraj, with the help of his friend, Nashid, fakes a situation to seek sympathy from Afeefa. Cast : Nooma Ibrahim as Aneesa, Niuma Mohamed as Afeefa, Mariyam Sheleen as Saara, Ahmed Asim as Siraj, Chilhiya Moosa Manik as Shakir, Aminath Shareef as Abidha, Shaman as Haleem, Ahmed Azmeel as Nashid, Mujthaba as Shamin
29	"An'dhiri Hayaaiy (Part 10)"	Arifa Ibrahim	Shareefa Fakhry	Mohamed Abdul Ghafoor, Mohamed Shiyaz	Aswad Najeeb
Shakir accepts defeat in their battle for love. In the present, Afeefa is revealed to be pregnant to her first child. Cast : Ali Shameel as Sharumeel, Nooma Ibrahim as Aneesa, Niuma Mohamed as Afeefa, Mariyam Sheleen as Saara, Ahmed Asim as Siraj, Chilhiya Moosa Manik as Shakir, Aminath Shareef as Abidha, Shaman as Haleem, Ahmed Azmeel as Nashid, Sameema as Shameema, Sheereen Abdul Wahid as Leesha, Neena Saleem as Shazma
30	"An'dhiri Hayaaiy (Part 11)"	Arifa Ibrahim	Shareefa Fakhry	Mohamed Abdul Ghafoor, Mohamed Shiyaz	Aswad Najeeb
The news of Afeefa's pregnancy brings a positive change to Siraj's behavior. Cast : Ali Shameel as Sharumeel, Nooma Ibrahim as Aneesa, Niuma Mohamed as Afeefa, Mariyam Sheleen as Saara, Ahmed Asim as Siraj, Sameema as Shameema, Sheereen Abdul Wahid as Leesha, Neena Saleem as Shazma
31	"An'dhiri Hayaaiy (Part 12)"	Arifa Ibrahim	Shareefa Fakhry	Mohamed Abdul Ghafoor, Mohamed Shiyaz	Aswad Najeeb
Afeefa regrets her choice of marrying Siraj, which costs her the love of her parents. She reads a text message on Siraj's phone which could prove his infidelity. Cast : Ali Shameel as Sharumeel, Nooma Ibrahim as Aneesa, Niuma Mohamed as Afeefa, Mariyam Sheleen as Saara, Ahmed Asim as Siraj, Sameema as Shameema, Sheereen Abdul Wahid as Leesha, Mujthaba as Shamin, Shaman as Haleem
32	"An'dhiri Hayaaiy (Part 13)"	Arifa Ibrahim	Shareefa Fakhry	Mohamed Abdul Ghafoor, Mohamed Shiyaz	Aswad Najeeb
Siraj departs to Sri Lanka, lying to Afeefa that he is needed by his sister, Sameeha, who is informed to be admitted in the hospital. Afeefa gets a call from Sameeha as she is unable to contact her brother for days. Few minutes later to the news of Abidha's death, Afeefa screams in labor pain. Cast : Ali Shameel as Sharumeel, Nooma Ibrahim as Aneesa, Niuma Mohamed as Afeefa, Mariyam Sheleen as Saara, Ahmed Asim as Siraj, Shaman as Haleem
33	"An'dhiri Hayaaiy (Part 14)"	Arifa Ibrahim	Shareefa Fakhry	Mohamed Abdul Ghafoor, Mohamed Shiyaz	Aswad Najeeb
Afeefa gives birth to a baby girl. Afeefa confronts Siraj about his lies which he admitted but refused to disclose his affair with Sudha, the sister of Leesha. Cast : Ali Shameel as Sharumeel, Nooma Ibrahim as Aneesa, Niuma Mohamed as Afeefa, Mariyam Sheleen as Saara, Ahmed Asim as Siraj, Shaman as Haleem, Mujthaba as Shamin, Zuleikha Abdul Latheef as a nurse, Sheereen Abdul Wahid as Leesha Aminath Rishfa as Sudha, Sakeena as Sudha's mother
34	"An'dhiri Hayaaiy (Part 15)"	Arifa Ibrahim	Shareefa Fakhry	Mohamed Abdul Ghafoor, Mohamed Shiyaz	Aswad Najeeb
Five years later, Sudha is married to Siraj as his second wife, despite several efforts from Leesha. Afeefa endures all her pains and sufferings solely due to her daughter, Shina, who has learning disability. Cast : Nooma Ibrahim as Aneesa, Niuma Mohamed as Afeefa, Ahmed Asim as Siraj, Shaman as Haleem, Aminath Rishfa as Sudha, Sheereen Abdul Wahid as Leesha, Shifra Abbas as Shina
35	"An'dhiri Hayaaiy (Part 16)"	Arifa Ibrahim	Shareefa Fakhry	Mohamed Abdul Ghafoor, Mohamed Shiyaz	Aswad Najeeb
After moving to the same building where Afeefa resides, Sudha makes it her life mission to distance Afeefa and Siraj. Leesha tries to knock some sense of responsibility into Siraj's head. Cast : Nooma Ibrahim as Aneesa, Niuma Mohamed as Afeefa, Ahmed Asim as Siraj, Aminath Rishfa as Sudha, Sheereen Abdul Wahid as Leesha, Shifra Abbas as Shina, Ahmed Azmeel as Nashid
36	"An'dhiri Hayaaiy (Part 17)"	Arifa Ibrahim	Shareefa Fakhry	Mohamed Abdul Ghafoor, Mohamed Shiyaz	Aswad Najeeb
Shina grew up with symptoms of ADHD, and Afeefa is caught in troubles in the neighborhood and within her family due to Shina's actions. Sudha makes use of every possibility to fill Siraj's head with hatred for Afeefa. Cast : Niuma Mohamed as Afeefa, Ahmed Asim as Siraj, Aminath Rishfa as Sudha, Sheereen Abdul Wahid as Leesha, Mariyam Sheleen as Shina, Shafaza as Shafeena
37	"An'dhiri Hayaaiy (Part 18)"	Arifa Ibrahim	Shareefa Fakhry	Mohamed Abdul Ghafoor, Mohamed Shiyaz	Aswad Najeeb
Empowered, Afeefa speaks her mind and finally decides to move free from her cage. Siraj's business hit a downturn and becomes financially weak. Leesha returns to Male' with her boyfriend, Anas. Cast : Niuma Mohamed as Afeefa, Ahmed Asim as Siraj, Aminath Rishfa as Sudha, Nooma Ibrahim as Aneesa, Sheereen Abdul Wahid as Leesha, Mohamed Shavin as Anas, Mariyam Sheleen as Shina, Chilhiya Moosa Manik as Shakir
38	"An'dhiri Hayaaiy (Part 19)"	Arifa Ibrahim	Shareefa Fakhry	Mohamed Abdul Ghafoor, Mohamed Shiyaz	Aswad Najeeb
Sudha's plan to create enmity between Siraj and his child takes an unexpected turn when Siraj starts realizing the true value of Afeefa and how irresponsible he is to their daughter. However, this does not stop Sudha from confining him further. Cast : Niuma Mohamed as Afeefa, Ahmed Asim as Siraj, Aminath Rishfa as Sudha, Sheereen Abdul Wahid as Leesha, Mariyam Sheleen as Shina, Chilhiya Moosa Manik as Shakir, Ahmed Azmeel as Nashid
39	"An'dhiri Hayaaiy (Part 20)"	Arifa Ibrahim	Shareefa Fakhry	Mohamed Abdul Ghafoor, Mohamed Shiyaz	Aswad Najeeb
Sudha fakes a medical condition to forbid Siraj from attending Shina's birthday party which causes dispute in the family. Sudha convinces Siraj to lock Shina in a separate room upstairs, which shatters Afeefa's heart. Exhausted, she gives up on her husband and pleads her sister, Aneesa to take them with her. In a conversation with Shazma, Leesha confirms that Sudha has no medical condition. Cast : Niuma Mohamed as Afeefa, Ahmed Asim as Siraj, Aminath Rishfa as Sudha, Sheereen Abdul Wahid as Leesha, Mariyam Sheleen as Shina, Chilhiya Moosa Manik as Shakir, Ahmed Azmeel as Nashid, Mohamed Shavin as Anas, Ali Shameel as Sharumeel, Sameema as Shameema, Neena Saleem as Shazma
40	"An'dhiri Hayaaiy (Part 21)"	Arifa Ibrahim	Shareefa Fakhry	Mohamed Abdul Ghafoor, Mohamed Shiyaz	Aswad Najeeb
In another episode of Sudha's conspiracy, Siraj warns Afeefa to stay in her limit. It is revealed that Sudha is the half-sister of Leesha. Siraj eavesdrops a conversation between Leesha and Sudha which implies the latter as the mastermind behind the family rivalry. Cast : Niuma Mohamed as Afeefa, Ahmed Asim as Siraj, Aminath Rishfa as Sudha, Sheereen Abdul Wahid as Leesha, Mariyam Sheleen as Shina, Chilhiya Moosa Manik as Shakir, Mohamed Shavin as Anas, Sakeena as Sudha's mother
41	"An'dhiri Hayaaiy (Part 22)"	Arifa Ibrahim	Shareefa Fakhry	Mohamed Abdul Ghafoor, Mohamed Shiyaz	Aswad Najeeb
Siraj feels guilty of his grave mistake. He goes back home to Afeefa only to find her preparing to relocate to her sister's place, on his prior command. Cast : Niuma Mohamed as Afeefa, Ahmed Asim as Siraj, Aminath Rishfa as Sudha, Sheereen Abdul Wahid as Leesha, Mariyam Sheleen as Shina, Chilhiya Moosa Manik as Shakir, Nooma Ibrahim as Aneesa
42	"An'dhiri Hayaaiy (Part 23)"	Arifa Ibrahim	Shareefa Fakhry	Mohamed Abdul Ghafoor, Mohamed Shiyaz	Aswad Najeeb
Siraj's younger sister, Samee, returns to Male' and is shocked to realize how complicated the situation is. Siraj divorces Sudha and pleads Afeefa for forgiveness. Shortly after, it is revealed that Sudha is pregnant to her first child. Cast : Niuma Mohamed as Afeefa, Ahmed Asim as Siraj, Aminath Rishfa as Sudha, Sheereen Abdul Wahid as Leesha, Mariyam Sheleen as Shina, Khadheeja Ibrahim Didi as Sameera, Mohamed Shavin as Anas, Sakeena as Sudha's mother, Sameema as Shameema, Neena Saleem as Shazma, Ibrahim as Shamin
43	"An'dhiri Hayaaiy (Part 24)"	Arifa Ibrahim	Shareefa Fakhry	Mohamed Abdul Ghafoor, Mohamed Shiyaz	Aswad Najeeb
In another revelation, it is revealed that Samee and Anas shares a previous relationship. Siraj makes several efforts to bring Afeefa back into his life but she refuses. Afeefa falls from the stairs and requires to undertake a major surgery. Cast : Niuma Mohamed as Afeefa, Ahmed Asim as Siraj, Sheereen Abdul Wahid as Leesha, Mariyam Sheleen as Shina, Khadheeja Ibrahim Didi as Sameera, Mohamed Shavin as Anas, Chilhiya Moosa Manik as Shakir, Nooma Ibrahim as Aneesa, Ahmed Azmeel as Nashid, Mausoodha as Saara
44	"An'dhiri Hayaaiy (Part 25)"	Arifa Ibrahim	Shareefa Fakhry	Mohamed Abdul Ghafoor, Mohamed Shiyaz	Aswad Najeeb
Leesha and Anas plan their marriage. Siraj decides to leave abroad with Afeefa for her surgery. Meanwhile, Sudha returns to Siraj's house and continues her catfight with Sameera. Cast : Ahmed Asim as Siraj, Sheereen Abdul Wahid as Leesha, Khadheeja Ibrahim Didi as Sameera, Mohamed Shavin as Anas, Ahmed Azmeel as Nashid, Sakeena as Sudha's mother
45	"An'dhiri Hayaaiy (Part 26)"	Arifa Ibrahim	Shareefa Fakhry	Mohamed Abdul Ghafoor, Mohamed Shiyaz	Aswad Najeeb
Siraj forgives Sudha for the sake of their unborn child. Aneesa and Siraj leaves abroad with Afeefa for her medical operations. Sameera schemes to avenge Anas for his wrongdoing in past. Anas is blackamiled by Sameera to accept all her terms if he does not want their affair to be exposed to Leesha. Cast : Ahmed Asim as Siraj, Aminath Rishfa as Sudha, Sheereen Abdul Wahid as Leesha, Khadheeja Ibrahim Didi as Sameera, Mohamed Shavin as Anas, Sameema as Shameema, Nooma Ibrahim as Aneesa, Mausoodha as Saara, Mariyam Sheleen as Shina, Shafaza as Shafeena
46	"An'dhiri Hayaaiy (Part 27)"	Arifa Ibrahim	Shareefa Fakhry	Mohamed Abdul Ghafoor, Mohamed Shiyaz	Aswad Najeeb
With the help of Nashid, Sameera schemes to separate Anas and Leesha. In a flashback it is revealed that, during school days, Nashid was deeply in love with Sameera who was instead interested in Anas. The latter decides to fake a relationship with her in order to make Nashid envious. Sameera realizes that her feelings were played by Anas. Heartbroken she returns home where her father decided to take her abroad to continue studies. Cast : Ahmed Asim as Siraj, Sheereen Abdul Wahid as Leesha, Khadheeja Ibrahim Didi as Sameera, Mohamed Shavin as Anas, Ahmed Azmeel as Nashid, Abdulla Muaz as Shiyaz, Mausoodha as Saara, Shafaza as Shafeena
47	"An'dhiri Hayaaiy (Part 28)"	Arifa Ibrahim	Shareefa Fakhry	Mohamed Abdul Ghafoor, Mohamed Shiyaz	Aswad Najeeb
Sharumeel advises Shamin to severe ties with his bad influencing peers including Zahid, who continues harassing Saara. Later that night, someone invades into her room, as part of the plan of Sameera to frame Anas in the action. Cast : Ahmed Asim as Siraj, Aminath Rishfa as Sudha, Sheereen Abdul Wahid as Leesha, Khadheeja Ibrahim Didi as Sameera, Mohamed Shavin as Anas, Ahmed Azmeel as Nashid, Aishath Siyadha as Saara, Ali Shameel as Sharumeel, Sakeena as Sudha's mother, Sameema as Shameema
48	"An'dhiri Hayaaiy (Part 29)"	Arifa Ibrahim	Shareefa Fakhry	Mohamed Abdul Ghafoor, Mohamed Shiyaz	Aswad Najeeb
Sameera plants Anas's watch in Saara's bedroom. Leesha suspects on his integrity and ultimately breaking up with him. Cast : Aminath Rishfa as Sudha, Sheereen Abdul Wahid as Leesha, Khadheeja Ibrahim Didi as Sameera, Mohamed Shavin as Anas, Ahmed Azmeel as Nashid, Aishath Siyadha as Saara, Ali Shameel as Sharumeel, Sakeena as Sudha's mother, Sameema as Shameema, Fauziyya Hassan as Anas's mother
49	"An'dhiri Hayaaiy (Part 30)"	Arifa Ibrahim	Shareefa Fakhry	Mohamed Abdul Ghafoor, Mohamed Shiyaz	Aswad Najeeb
Aneesa returns from abroad and defends her daughter in the misdeed rumor spreading about her. In a confrontation, Leesha shows his watch as an evidence but he fails to defend himself. Cast : Ahmed Asim as Siraj, Nooma Ibrahim as Aneesa, Aminath Rishfa as Sudha, Sheereen Abdul Wahid as Leesha, Khadheeja Ibrahim Didi as Sameera, Mohamed Shavin as Anas, Ahmed Azmeel as Nashid, Aishath Siyadha as Saara, Ali Shameel as Sharumeel, Sameema as Shameema, Fauziyya Hassan as Anas's mother, Shafaza as Shafeena
50	"An'dhiri Hayaaiy (Part 31)"	Arifa Ibrahim	Shareefa Fakhry	Mohamed Abdul Ghafoor, Mohamed Shiyaz	Aswad Najeeb
Sudha gives birth to a baby daughter. Unable to bear the pain of separation, Anas decided to relocate to Sri Lanka, which triggers Leesha to soften her heart. Sameera's plan is on the verge of backfiring, when Nashid slowly starts growing affection towards Saara. Cast : Ahmed Asim as Siraj, Nooma Ibrahim as Aneesa, Aminath Rishfa as Sudha, Sheereen Abdul Wahid as Leesha, Khadheeja Ibrahim Didi as Sameera, Mohamed Shavin as Anas, Ahmed Azmeel as Nashid, Aishath Siyadha as Saara, Fauziyya Hassan as Anas's mother
51	"An'dhiri Hayaaiy (Part 32)"	Arifa Ibrahim	Shareefa Fakhry	Mohamed Abdul Ghafoor, Mohamed Shiyaz	Aswad Najeeb
Five years later, Leesha is happily married to Anas while Nashid marries Saara as approved by her family. Afeefa returns Male’ with her daughter who is fully recovered and in good health. Sudha, who is believed to be reformed, is distresses that Siraj has to share his time with between his two wives. Cast : Niuma Mohamed as Afeefa, Ahmed Asim as Siraj, Nooma Ibrahim as Aneesa, Aminath Rishfa as Sudha, Sheereen Abdul Wahid as Leesha, Ali Shameel as Sharumeel, Mohamed Shavin as Anas, Ahmed Azmeel as Nashid, Aishath Siyadha as Saara, Mariyam Sheleen as Shina, Shifra Abbas as Shaisha
52	"An'dhiri Hayaaiy (Part 33)"	Arifa Ibrahim	Shareefa Fakhry	Mohamed Abdul Ghafoor, Mohamed Shiyaz	Aswad Najeeb
Sudha suffers a medical condition and is taken to hospital in emergency where she is declared dead shortly. The family observes a setback with her demise and Siraj decides to relocate to abroad since he is abandoned from Afeefa's affection and love. Prior to his departure, they reunite and the families rejoice their reunion. Cast : Niuma Mohamed as Afeefa, Ahmed Asim as Siraj, Nooma Ibrahim as Aneesa, Aminath Rishfa as Sudha, Sheereen Abdul Wahid as Leesha, Ali Shameel as Sharumeel, Mohamed Shavin as Anas, Ahmed Azmeel as Nashid, Aishath Siyadha as Saara, Mariyam Sheleen as Shina, Shifra Abbas as Shaisha, Sakeena as Sudha's mother, Neena Saleem as Shazma

== Soundtrack ==
Track listing
No.	Title	Lyrics	Music	Singer(s)	Length
1.	"Hiyy Edhey Kameh Mihaa"	Hassan Manik	Muaviyath Anwar	Loosiyan Abdul Rahman, Lahfa Faiz	5:43

== Reception ==
Upon release, the series met with mixed reviews from audience, where the director's effort in working on an anthology series with different creative members and screenwriters were applauded while the screenplay of some segments were noted to be over-dramatic yet appropriate for a soap opera. The series was included in the list of the "finest productions by Arifa Ibrahim".
