= Mariyam Zuhura =

Maldivian actress (born 1986)

- Born: 22 June 1986 (age 40); K. Dhiffushi, Maldives
- Occupation: Actress
- Years active: 2003–2012
- Spouse: Ahmed Shirhan (m. 2006)
- Children: 1

Mariyam Zuhura (22 June 1986) is a Maldivian former film actress.

== Career ==
In 2003, Zuhura worked with Mohamed Shareef and Muawiyath Anwar for their television series, Ujaalaa Raasthaa, which narrates the journey of two best friends in three generations. The series developed as an attempt to aware the audience on several social issues, was widely accepted by the audience and received positive reviews from critics.

Initially, Zuhura was supposed to make her official film debut with Abdul Faththaah-directed romantic film, Viremun Midhaa Hiyy Magey opposite Ibrahim Jihad, which however was delayed in post-production and was ultimately shelved. Hence, the team instead moved forward with Faththaah-directed romantic disaster film, Hureemey Inthizaarugaa (2005), where she was cast along with Ravee Farooq, Waleedha Waleed, Ibrahim Jihad and Neena Saleem. The film, heavily relied on the effect of the 2004 Indian Ocean earthquake on the Maldives, received favorable reviews from critics though it failed to perform financially. She next appeared in a small role in Mohamed Shareef-directed drama series Loabi Vaanama where she played the role of Thahu, a new recruit in the office of one of the main four characters. The first episode of the series was met with lukewarm response from the audience due to the different "visualization style" of the director and the scene arrangement by screenwriter. However, from the second episode onwards, the series picked up and become a success among the critics and audience.

The following year, she appeared as a sorcerer in the horror film Hukuru Vileyrey (2006), co-directed by Aishath Rishmy and Aminath Rasheedha which was based on a novel published by Ibrahim Waheed on Haveeru Daily in 2003. The film being a critical and commercial success was considered as "one of the best horror film the Maldivian Film Industry has ever produced". She next worked with Faththaah for his romantic drama series, Kuramey Vadhaaee Salaam which follows the journey of a man from a wealthy family, getting backed off from them due to his love interest and the depression he goes through due to his wife's untimely death. She next collaborated with Arifa Ibrahim for her romantic television drama series, Vaguthu Faaithu Nuvanees (2006) which consists of fifty episodes. The series which follows the vengeance and retribution two best-friends go through when they both love the same person, features her in the role of Shazma, a religious and acquiescent woman who is mistreated by her brother and sister-in-law. After the thirty-third episode, she was replaced by Sheela Najeeb for the role, following Zuhura's marriage and pregnancy.

She made a comeback in 2010 with Ahmed Shah-directed television series, Diary opposite Lufshan Shakeeb as a high school student and a victim of sexual abuse. This was followed by her appearance as a newly wed bride hoping to reform her husband while dealing with a problematic family, in Abdul Faththaah's limited drama series, Kaiveni (2012), alongside Ali Azim.

== Personal life ==
Zuhura married the graphic designer, Ahmed Shirhan in 2006. On 11 September 2007, the couple had a girl, Aishath Rayna Shirhan.

== Filmography ==
=== Feature film ===
Year	Title	Role	Notes	Ref(s)
2005	Hureemey Inthizaarugaa	Reena		
2006	Hukuru Vileyrey	Fazna		

=== Television ===
Year	Title	Role	Notes	Ref(s)
2003	Ujaalaa Raasthaa	Wadheefa	Recurring role; 6 episodes	
2004	Thiyey Mihithuge Vindhakee	Doctor	Guest role; "Episode 50"	
2005	Loabi Vaanama	Thahu	Recurring role; 3 episodes	
2005	Baiveriyaa	Rishfa	Recurring role; 4 episodes	
2006	Kuramey Vadhaaee Salaam	Laila Adam	Main role; 13 episodes	
2006–2007	Vaguthu Faaithu Nuvanees	Shazma	Main role; 33 episodes	
2010	Diary	Rishna	Main role; 4 episodes	
2012	Kaiveni	Firasha	Main role; 4 episodes	

== Accolades ==
Year	Award	Category	Nominated work	Result	Ref(s)
2008	2nd Miadhu Crystal Award	Best Actress	Vaguthu Faaithu Nuvanees	Won	
