= Loabi Vaanama =

Maldivian television series

- Screenplay by: Mahdi Ahmed
- Story by: Mahdi Ahmed
- Directed by: Mohamed Shareef
- Starring: Sheela Najeeb; Mohamed Manik; Fathimath Noora; Ahmed Saeed
- Music by: Muawiyath Anwar
- Country of origin: Maldives
- Original language: Dhivehi
- No. of seasons: 1
- No. of episodes: 13

Production
- Executive producer: Mariyam Shaugee
- Cinematography: Hussain Imthiyaz
- Running time: 22-31 minutes

Original release
- Release: 2005

Loabi Vaanama is a 2005 Maldivian television series directed by Mohamed Shareef and distributed by Television Maldives. The series focuses on the lives of four colleagues, played by Sheela Najeeb, Mohamed Manik, Fathimath Noora and Ahmed Saeed.

== Cast ==
=== Main ===
- Sheela Najeeb as Nisha
- Mohamed Manik as Sameer
- Fathimath Noora as Aminath Rifa
- Ahmed Saeed as Yasir

=== Recurring ===
- Arifa Ibrahim as Habeeba; Nisha's mother
- Ahmed Asim as Ibrahim Umar
- Ali Waheed as Hamid
- Shaifa Ibrahim as Shara
- Hassan Manik as Faseeh
- Sheereen Abdul Wahid as Rameeza
- Aminath Wafiyya as Jameela Easa
- Mariyam Zuhura as Thahu
- Ahmed Hassan as Abeer

=== Guest ===
- Hussain Nooradeen as Waheed
- Zeenath Abbas as Niuma
- Abdulla Faisal as Ibrahim's colleague (Episode 5)
- Abdulla Munaz (Episode 5)

== Episodes ==
No. in season	Title	Directed by
1	"Episode 1"	Mohamed Shareef
Nisha (Sheela Najeeb), a happy-go-lucky girl works in the same office with Sameer (Mohamed Manik), Yasir (Ahmed Saeed) and Rifa (Fathimath Noora). Sameer, being a nerd is hesitant to propose to his crush, Nisha, while the latter is smitten by a stranger she meets, Ibrahim (Ahmed Asim). Yasir lives an unhappy married life with Rameeza (Sheereen Abdul Wahid) while Rifa starts dating a married man, Waheed (Hussain Nooradeen).
2	"Episode 2"	Mohamed Shareef
Waheed's wife, Niuma (Zeenath Abbas) catches him red-handed, which leads to Rifa breaking up with Wahid. Ibrahim discloses his past to Nisha, that he was previously banished due to possession of liquor. This causes Nisha to freak out though she later reunites with him. Nisha's mother, Habeeba (Arifa Ibrahim) disapproves their relationship though Nisha determines to stay with him despite all the obstacles.
3	"Episode 3"	Mohamed Shareef
Post her marriage with Ibrahim, Nisha becomes confused with her husband's delusional behavior. Devoted to her husband, Nisha quits her job though she finds no peace in life. The news of her pregnancy brought an unexpected explosive reaction to Ibrahim.
4	"Episode 4"	Mohamed Shareef
Nisha stressed with her life condition, seeks solace in the company of Sameer. As Nisha is about to give up on Ibrahim, he expresses a reformed behavior. Sameer quits his job and relocates to his island. Meanwhile, Ibrahim goes to an office trip to an island in North. After he leaves, Nisha discovers that he has fled with her savings of MVR 20,000.
5	"Episode 5"	Mohamed Shareef
Further inquiry revealed that Ibrahim has resigned from his job. Realizing that there is no path which leads to Ibrahim, Nisha longs for Sameer's affection. One stormy night, Ibrahim returns to Nisha, much to her surprise.
6	"Episode 6"	Mohamed Shareef
Ibrahim admits to his crime and pleads Nisha to apprehend him. Yasir starts having feelings towards their new recruit, Thahu (Mariyam Zuhura). Sameer shares his marriage plans with Nisha which breaks her heart.
7	"Episode 7"	Mohamed Shareef
Nisha gives birth to a healthy girl, Shara (Shaifa Ibrahim). A quote by Nisha on relationship triggered Yasir and Rameeza which led them into having sex after a long time. Disrespecting his wife, Sameer starts avoiding her. Completing his trial period, Ibrahim makes an emotional reunion with his daughter. Their happy moments are short-lived as Ibrahim dies suffering from liver cancer.
8	"Episode 8"	Mohamed Shareef
Rameeza and Yasir welcome their first newborn child. Rifa is hired to work as an accountant in a firm where her manager, Faseeh (Hassan Manik) keeps constantly flirting with her.
9	"Episode 9"	Mohamed Shareef
It was later revealed that Faseeh is the ex-boyfriend of Nisha whom she dated during school days. They start spending time together behind Rifa's back. Sameer divorces his wife and tries to get back with Nisha. Rifa discovers that Faseel ditched her to join Nisha at a resort.
10	"Episode 10"	Mohamed Shareef
Rifa terminates her friendship with Nisha and quits her job. On learning the actual story from Faseel, Rifa reunites with Nisha. With confidence, Sameer visits Nisha to propose her, though he is stopped at the sight of Nisha being with another man, Hamid (Ali Waheed), a family friend. Before Sameer could, Hamid asks Nisha to marry him.
11	"Episode 11"	Mohamed Shareef
Nisha marries Hamid who turns out to be a short-tempered sadomasochist.
12	"Episode 12"	Mohamed Shareef
13	"Episode 13"	Mohamed Shareef

== Soundtrack ==
Track listing
No.	Title	Music	Singer(s)	Length
1.	"Loabi Vaanama"	Abdul Rafiu	Abdul Rafiu, Hassan Naagith, Fathimath Shaanee

== Reception ==
The first episode of the series was met with lukewarm response from the audience due to the different "visualization style" of the director and the scene arrangement by screenwriter. However, from the second episode onwards, the series picked up and become a success among the critics and audience.
