= Vahum =

Maldivian television film

- Official film poster
- Written by: Bimma Ibrahim Waheed
- Screenplay by: Bimma Ibrahim Waheed
- Directed by: Mohamed Shiyaz
- Starring: Niuma Mohamed; Lufshan Shakeeb
- Country of origin: Maldives
- Original language: Dhivehi

Production
- Producer: Television Maldives
- Cinematography: Mohamed Shiyaz

Original release
- Release: April 29, 2004

Vahum is a 2004 Maldivian horror Television film directed by Mohamed Shiyaz. Produced by Television Maldives, the film stars Niuma Mohamed and Lufshan Shakeeb in pivotal roles.

== Premise ==
Muna (Niuma Mohamed), an ambitious young woman relocates to her husband's house after their marriage. Soon after, Muna experiences strange incidents in the house which her husband, Amir (Lufshan Shakeeb) takes lightly with a humor. To her surprise, everyone whom Muna meets in the island questions her on how well she knows about her husband and advice to be cautious while staying in the house. She meets an insane woman, Sakeena (Neena Saleem) who reveals a big revelation with regard to Amir's past relationships.

== Cast ==
- Niuma Mohamed as Muna
- Lufshan Shakeeb as Amir Idrees
- Chilhiya Moosa Manik as Moosa
- Neena Saleem as Sakeena
- Husnee as Husnee
- Sheereen Abdul Wahid as Sheereen
