= Vairoalhi Ahves Sirrun =

- Genre: Romantic drama
- Written by: Shareefa Fakhree
- Screenplay by: Arifa Ibrahim
- Directed by: Arifa Ibrahim
- Starring: Niuma Mohamed
- No. of seasons: 1
- No. of episodes: 52

Production
- Running time: 23–25 minutes

Original release
- Network: Television Maldives
- Release: 2005 – 2006

Vairoalhi Ahves Sirrun is a Maldivian romantic drama television series developed for Television Maldives by Arifa Ibrahim. The series stars Niuma Mohamed, Lufshan Shakeeb and Ahmed Asim in pivotal roles.

== Premise ==
Nadheem (Ahmed Asim), the only child of Naseer (Ali Shameel) and Wadheefa (Mariyam Shakeela), is secretly in love with his best-friend, Mariyam Shaanee (Niuma Mohamed), the indolent daughter of Seema (Aminath Rasheedha). While Nadheem's true feelings are concealed to Shaanee, she starts a romantic relationship with Shah (Lufshan Shakeeb), a cousin of Nadheem. However, things take an unfortunate turn when Seema reveals that Shaanee's father, on his dying bed, requested that Shaanee marries no one but Nadheem, which complicates her relationship with Shah.

== Cast and characters ==
=== Main ===
- Niuma Mohamed as Mariyam Shaanee
- Lufshan Shakeeb as Shah
- Ahmed Asim as Ahmed Nadheem
- Ali Shameel as Naseer
- Aminath Rasheedha as Seema
- Mariyam Shakeela as Wadheefa

=== Recurring ===
- Ahmed Azmeel as Nahid; Shah's friend
- Khadheeja Ibrahim Didi as Thooba
- Aminath Shareef as Shah's mother
- Waleedha as Sithura Mohamed Wajeeh

=== Guest ===
- Mohamed Manik as Ibrahim; Thooba's friend
- Ali Azim as Shahid
- Fathimath Sama as a party guest
- Abdulla Munaz as a Doctor

== Soundtrack ==
Track listing
No.	Title	Lyrics	Music	Singer(s)	Length
1.	"Vairoalhi Ahves Sirrun" (Male Version)	Ahmed Nashid (Dharavandhoo)	Mohamed Shahubaan	Mohamed Shahubaan
2.	"Eyrugaa Ufaa"	Ahmed Haleem		Shifa Thaufeeq
3.	"Manziley Dhuniyeyn"	Fathimath Nahula		Ali Rameez
4.	"Vairoalhi Ahves Sirrun" (Female version)	Ahmed Nashid (Dharavandhoo)	Mohamed Shahubaan	Moonisa Khaleel

== Accolades ==
Year	Award	Category	Recipients	Result	Ref.
2007	Miadhu Crystal Award	Best Drama Series	Vairoalhi Ahves Sirrun	Won	
