= Kuramey Vadhaaee Salaam =

2006 Maldivian TV series

- Genre: Romantic drama
- Written by: Mahdi Ahmed
- Screenplay by: Mahdi Ahmed
- Directed by: Abdul Faththaah
- Starring: Mohamed Manik; Mariyam Zuhura; Mariyam Afeefa
- Music by: Ibrahim Nifar
- Country of origin: Maldives
- Original language: Divehi
- No. of seasons: 1
- No. of episodes: 13

Production
- Producer: Abdul Faththaah
- Cinematography: Ibrahim Moosa
- Editors: Abdul Faththaah; Ibrahim Shiruhan
- Running time: 18-24 minutes
- Production company: Red Production

Original release
- Network: Television Maldives
- Release: 2006

Kuramey Vadhaaee Salaam is a 2006 Maldivian romantic family television series directed by Abdul Faththaah. The series stars Mohamed Manik, Mariyam Zuhura and Mariyam Afeefa in lead roles. The series marks Afeefa's first appearance in a television series.

== Premise ==
After graduation, Fayaz (Mohamed Manik) the only son of a family helps his father, Saleem, in running his business. Ramiz (Ahmed Saeed), the son-in-law of the family, brainwashes Firasha (Khadheeja Ibrahim Didi), the younger sibling of Fayaz, accusing him as the ungrateful greedy man trying to captivate his father's wealth while leaving nothing for Firasha. Fayaz falls in love with Yumna (Mariyam Afeefa), an attractive young woman who temporarily moves into their house. Saleem disapproves their relationship and evicts the couple from his house, when Fayaz refuses to let Yumna go. Fayaz marries Yumna and they live a happy life with their kid until Yumna is met with an untimely death.

== Cast ==
=== Main role ===
- Mohamed Manik as Ahmed Fayaz
- Mariyam Zuhura as Laila Adam
- Mariyam Afeefa as Aminath Yumna
- Ibrahim Jihad as Irufan
- Ahmed Saeed as Ramiz
- Khadheeja Ibrahim Didi as Firasha
- Mohamed Waheed as Mohamed Saleem
- Nahidha Mansoor as Azeeza
- Neena Saleem as Shamna; Laila's friend
- Fathimath Aflaz Faisal as Natha
- Aminath Shareef as Arifa; Laila's mother

=== Guest role ===
- Mohamed Afrah as Shamin (Episode 1)
- Chilhiya Moosa Manik as a magistrate (Episode 8)
- Hussain Nooradeen as a shop-keeper (Episode 11)

== Soundtrack ==
Track listing
No.	Title	Lyrics	Music	Singer(s)	Length
1.	"Loabin Kalaa"	Mohamed Abdul Ghanee	Ayyuman Shareef	Mukhthar Adam, Shifa Thaufeeq	4:35
2.	"Dhookoh Nudhey"	Mohamed Abdul Ghanee	Ayyuman Shareef	Mukhthar Adam, Shifa Thaufeeq	2:37
