= Vaguthu Faaithu Nuvanees =

Maldivian romantic drama television series

- Genre: Romantic drama
- Written by: Shareefa Fakhree
- Screenplay by: Arifa Ibrahim
- Directed by: Arifa Ibrahim
- Starring: Niuma Mohamed; Lufshan Shakeeb; Ahmed Asim; Mariyam Zuhura; Sheela Najeeb
- No. of seasons: 1
- No. of episodes: 52

Production
- Producer: Mariyam Shaugee
- Running time: 23–25 minutes

Original release
- Network: Television Maldives
- Release: 2006 – 2007

Vaguthu Faaithu Nuvanees is a Maldivian romantic drama television series developed for Television Maldives by Arifa Ibrahim. The series stars Niuma Mohamed, Mariyam Zuhura, Lufshan Shakeeb and Ahmed Asim in pivotal roles.

== Premise ==
Sama (Niuma Mohamed), Shazma (Mariyam Zuhura) and Firaq (Ahmed Azmeel) are three colleagues working at the same office under Shifaz (Lufshan Shakeeb). Sama, the pampered daughter of Waheed (Roanu Hassan Manik) and Shameema (Aminath Shareef) has romantic feeling towards Shifaz while he is more attracted to Shazma who lives with his brother, Saleem (Ali Shameel) and her wicked sister-in-law, Jameela (Aminath Rasheedha). Shazma initiates a relationship with Firaq's friend, Ahmed Shamin (Ahmed Asim).

== Cast and characters ==
=== Main ===
- Niuma Mohamed as Sama
- Lufshan Shakeeb as Shifaz
- Mariyam Zuhura as Shazma (33 episodes)
- Ahmed Asim as Ahmed Shamin
- Sheela Najeeb as Shazma (17 episodes)

=== Recurring ===
- Aminath Rasheedha as Jameela
- Ali Shameel as Saleem
- Aminath Shareef as Shameema; Sama's mother
- Roanu Hassan Manik as Waheed; Sama's father
- Ahmed Azmeel as Firaz
- Mariyam Shakeela as Haneefa

=== Guest ===
- Ahmed Nimal as Shareef; Sama's birth father
- Mohamed Faisal as a witness

== Soundtrack ==
Track listing
No.	Title	Lyrics	Singer(s)	Length
1.	"Vaguthu Faaithu Nuvanees"	Ahmed Nashidh (Dharavandhoo)	Moonisa Khaleel
2.	"Kiyaa Kiyaa"	Ahmed Nashidh (Dharavandhoo)	Sofoora Khaleel, Mohamed Shahubaan

== Accolades ==
Year	Award	Category	Recipients	Result	Ref.
2008	2nd Miadhu Crystal Award	Best Director	Arifa Ibrahim	Won	
2008	2nd Miadhu Crystal Award	Best Actress	Mariyam Zuhura	Won	
2008	2nd Miadhu Crystal Award	Best Villain	Aminath Rasheedha	Won	
2008	2nd Miadhu Crystal Award	Best Father	Roanu Hassan Manik	Won	
2008	2nd Miadhu Crystal Award	Best Mother	Mariyam Shakeela	Won	
2008	2nd Miadhu Crystal Award	Best Story	Mariyam Moosa	Won	
