= Neena Saleem =

Maldivian actress

- Occupation: Actress
- Years active: 1994–present

Neena Saleem is a Maldivian actress.

== Career ==
In 1996, Saleem made a brief appearance in Yoosuf Rafeeu's award winning film Haqqu as a friend of Lamha, a promiscuous woman who falls in love with a married man. The film starring Mariyam Nisha, Reeko Moosa Manik and Mariyam Shakeela in lead roles, received positive reviews from critics.

In 2000, she played the helpful friend of Nasiha, an attractive young woman in a relationship with a married man and a patient suffering from congenital heart disease in Abdul Faththaah's television drama series Dhoapatta. Starring alongside Mohamed Shavin, Jamsheedha Ahmed, Sheela Najeeb and Niuma Mohamed, the series centers on unrequited love and complications of a relationship within and beyond marriage. The following year, Saleem played role of a college lecturer, in Hussain Adil's romance Hiyy Halaaku (2000) alongside Yoosuf Shafeeu, Niuma Mohamed and Sheela Najeeb. The plot combines two love triangles set years apart. The first half covers friends on a college campus, while the second tells the story of a widower's young daughter who tries to reunite her dad with his old friend. The film was an unofficial remake of Karan Johar's romantic drama film Kuch Kuch Hota Hai (1998) starring Shah Rukh Khan, Kajol and Rani Mukerji in the lead role. Mariyam Shauqee's widely acclaimed family drama television series Kahthiri was released during the same year, where she played the role of the indolent wife, living in a congested housing complex while dealing with several social issues.

Amjad Ibrahim-directed Ainbehge Loabi Firiehge Vaajib, starring Saleem, Yoosuf Shafeeu, Jamsheedha Ahmed, Arifa Ibrahim and Niuma Mohamed was released in 2000. The film revolves around a woman who has been mistreated by her step-mother and forced into a marriage she disapproves. Saleem played the role of Vileena, an indolent daughter who ill-treats her own mother. It was followed by year's most successful Maldivian film, Ahmed Nimal's horror classic Zalzalaa (2000) where Saleem played the role of Nashfa, an irresponsible wife who abandons her only child. The film follows a man who lost his life and endangering his whole family while being lured by a female spirit sent off to complete an unfulfilled prophecy. She again worked with Amjad Ibrahim for his comedy drama film Qurbaani (1999) starring opposite Yoosuf Shafeeu and Mariyam Nisha. The film was a financially successful project and was declared a Mega-Hit at the end of its run at cinema.

She next starred in Ali Shameel's drama film Hithi Nimun (2001) opposite Mohamed Shavin, Mariyam Nisha and Sheereen Abdul Wahid, which follows the storyline of a stubborn young man who abandons his girlfriend when he discovers about her pregnancy.

She again worked with Amjad Ibrahim for two projects; his horror film Sandhuravirey (2002) which narrates the story of a female jinn aiming to win the heart of a human being and his drama film opposite Yoosuf Shafeeu and Sheela Najeeb, Kahvalhah Dhaandhen (2002). Featuring Yoosuf Shafeeu and Mariyam Nisha in lead roles, the former received poor reviews from critics.

Saleem collaborated with Amjad Ibrahim for his romantic horror film Dhonkamana (2003) which depicts the romantic relationship between a young man (played by Yoosuf Shafeeu) and an old woman (played by Fauziyya Hassan). Featuring Hassan, Yoosuf Shafeeu, Sheela Najeeb, Niuma Mohamed, Sheereen Abdul Wahid, Amira Ismail and Aminath Rasheedha, the film received mainly negative reviews from critics though its inclusion of the theme portraying the relationship between a couple with a large age group was appraised. It was followed by Abdul Faththaah-directed Aan... Aharenves Loabivin (2002) starred alongside Ali Seezan, Niuma Mohamed, Sheela Najeeb and Aminath Rasheedha where she played the best friend of a girl who had a bitter relationship with her lovers and an unfortunate incidence leading her to suffer from amnesia. Upon release, the film opened to positive response from critics and was a commercially successful project. She was applauded for her performance as the short-tempered and diligent wife, in the Abdul Faththaah-directed critically acclaimed television series, Thiyey Mihithuge Vindhakee (2003) which was considered as one of the best series production in television industry.

Saleem reprised her role as Jauza in Amjad Ibrahim's next directorial venture Sandhuravirey 2 (2004); a sequel to his 2002 horror film Sandhuravirey. Starring additional cast including Niuma Mohamed, Zeenath Abbas, Mohamed Shavin and Sheereen Abdul Wahid, the film follows a storyline of the daughter jinn avenging the death of its mother and sister on Dhiyash's family. Similar to its prequel, the film received negative response from critics. The following year, Saleem starred alongside Niuma Mohamed, Ali Seezan and Sheereen Abdul Wahid in Ahmed Nimal's horror film Handhu Keytha (2005) which unfolds the story of a man who was enchanted by a spirit while witnessing a lunar eclipse. In the film, she played the caring nurse who helps her friend dealing with the horrific incidences. The same year, Saleem collaborated with Abdul Faththaah for his romantic disaster film, Hureemey Inthizaarugaa (2005) cast along with Ravee Farooq, Mariyam Zuhura, Waleedha Waleed and Ibrahim Jihad. The film, heavily relied on the effect of the 2004 Indian Ocean earthquake on the Maldives, received favorable reviews from critics though it failed to perform financially.

In 2011, Saleem played the role of Aishath, a member of the spoilt friends spending all their money on partying, in the Moomin Fuad-directed crime tragedy drama Loodhifa. Featuring an ensemble cast, the film deals with current social issues in the society told from different perspectives of the characters. Made on a budget of MVR 600,000, the film was declared a commercial failure though it received widespread critical acclaim. A series of flop was continued with Hamid Ali's Laelaa starring Yoosuf Shafeeu, Amira Ismail and Fathimath Azifa alongside her. In 2013, she starred in a small role as a sonographer in Hussain Munawwar's second direction, revenge thriller film Dhilakani (2013). The film deals with a man's tumultuous journey to seek vengeance and the demolition of family bond over a girl.

Saleem's only release of 2017 was Ali Musthafa-directed Malikaa which did not do well at the box office.

== Media image ==
In 2012, Saleem was ranked at the third position in the list of "Best Actresses in Maldives" compiled by Haveeru, where writer Ahmed Nadheem opined that she is the perfect choice for the role of a "vile woman" as portrayed in projects like Kahthiri.

== Filmography ==
=== Feature film ===
Year	Title	Role	Notes	Ref(s)
1995	Dhushman	Herself	Special appearance	
1996	Haqqu	Naaznee	Special appearance	
1999	Qurbaani	Herself	Special appearance in the song "Handhaaneh Aavee Ey"	
2000	Hiyy Halaaku	Ms. Sharafiyya		
2000	Ainbehge Loabi Firiehge Vaajib	Vileena		
2000	Zalzalaa	Nashfa		
2000	Saahibaa	Mariyam's friend	Special appearance	
2000	Namoonaa			
2001	Hithi Nimun	Fareedha		
2002	Sandhuravirey	Jauza		
2002	Kahvalhah Dhaandhen	Nujey		
2002	Aan... Aharenves Loabivin	Fazee		
2003	Dhonkamana	Haleema's sister		
2004	Dharinnahtakai	Athifa		
2004	Sandhuravirey 2	Jauza		
2005	Handhu Keytha	Liusha		
2005	Hureemey Inthizaarugaa	Aishath Shirumeena		
2011	Loodhifa	Aishath		
2011	Laelaa	—N/a		
2013	Dhilakani	A sonographer	Special appearance	
2014	Aniyaa	Zaheen's sister		
2017	Malikaa	Badhoora		

=== Television ===
Year	Title	Role	Notes	Ref(s)
1997–1999	Kahthiri	Jeeza	Main role; 49 episodes	
2000	Dhoapatta	Faathun	Recurring role; 3 episodes	
2003–2004	Thiyey Mihithuge Vindhakee	Inaya	Recurring role; 11 episodes	
2004	Vaisoori	Shazma	In the segment "An'dhiri Hayaaiy"	
2004	Dhiriulhumakee Mieebaa?	Mariyam	Episode: Seytu	
2004	Vahum	Sakeena	Television film	
2004–2005	Loabi Nulibunas	Sofoora	Recurring role; 4 episodes	
2005–2006	Kuramey Vadhaaee Salaam	Shamna	Main role; 13 episodes	
2006–2008	Hinithun Velaashey Kalaa	Raziyya	Main role; 30 episodes	
2007	Aharenge Lha Daddy		Main role; 5 episodes	
2009	Sirru Sirrun Kalaa	Naseem's sister	Main role	
2010	Keekey Dhen Bunaanee?	Mareena	Main role	
2012	Kaiveni	Zahidha	Main role; 5 episodes	
2013	Adhives Eloaibah Gadharu Kuran	Zubeydha	Recurring role	

=== Short film ===
Year	Title	Role	Notes
2001	Paree Dhahtha	Neena	
2007	Foolhu Dhigu Handi 2	Aaminaabee	
2007	E Soru	Hareera	
2007	E Soru 2	Hareera	
2008	Kafi Kafi Loabi	Kaiydha	
2008	Girlfriend	Shirumeen	
2012	Kidnap	Nahu's friend	
