= Badhal =

- Official film poster
- Directed by: Hamid Ali
- Written by: Hamid Ali; Ishaq
- Screenplay by: Hamid Ali; Mohamed Nasheed
- Produced by: Hussain Rasheed
- Starring: Hamid Ali; Hussain Sobah; Niuma Mohamed; Waleedha Waleed
- Cinematography: Mohamed Nasheed
- Edited by: Ali Rasheed
- Music by: Muaviyath Anwar
- Production company: Farivaa Films
- Release date: October 9, 1996
- Country: Maldives
- Language: Dhivehi

Badhal is a 1996 Maldivian comedy drama film directed by Hamid Ali. Produced by Hussain Rasheed under Farivaa Films, the film stars Hamid Ali, Hussain Sobah, Niuma Mohamed and Waleedha Waleed in pivotal roles. The film was released on 9 October 1996.

== Premise ==
Hussain (Hussain Sobah), a teenage boy with an immature attitude was restricted from attending his father's death anniversary held to honor his last wish of handing over the business to Hussain. Hussain's uncle, Wafir (Hamid Ali), humiliated by Hussain's presence in the party storm off at him when his plan of acquiring the business property backfires. A physiologist suggested Hussain to marry someone who is endearing and caring to obliterate the childhood trauma caused by Wafir's abuse. Wafir arranged Hussain's marriage with a wealthy businessman's only daughter, Shiuna (Niuma Mohamed) a charismatic and intelligent teenage girl. Regarding him as a mentally ill guy, Shiuna refutes the marriage proposal.

== Cast ==
- Hamid Ali as Wafir
- Hussain Sobah as Hussain and Hassan
- Niuma Mohamed as Shiuna
- Waleedha Waleed as Shaarudha
- Azleena as Naseema
- Chilhiya Moosa Manik as Moosa Manik
- Haajara Abdul Kareem
- Fathimath Shadhiya as Shadhiya
- Shameema Ahmed

== Soundtrack ==
Track listing
No.	Title	Lyrics	Singer(s)	Length
1.	"Reethi Chaandhaneemaa Folhuvee"	Ahmed Sharumeel	Fathimath Zoona
2.	"Ekani Vaneeye"	Hussain Sobah	Hussain Sobah, Shifa Thaufeeq
3.	"Adhi Heela Adhi Dheyshey Kiyaa"	Hussain Sobah	Hussain Sobah, Shifa Thaufeeq
4.	"Ge Ekey Nikan Reethi"	Easa Shareef	Ahmed Waheedh, Fathimath Zoona
5.	"Ekeegaa Dhaanvee"	Fathimath Ushaama Hamidh	Mohamed Rashad
6.	"Thaazaa Ufaa Veeyey"	Ahmed Riza (Tharaboozu)	Abdul Hannan Moosa Didi, Fathimath Zoona
7.	"Nulibey Ufaa Hoadhan"	Easa Shareef	Abdul Hannan Moosa Didi

== Accolades ==
Year	Award	Category	Recipients	Result	Ref(s)
1997	Aafathis Awards - 1996	Best Actress	Niuma Mohamed	Won	
1997	Aafathis Awards - 1996	Best Performer of the Year	Niuma Mohamed	Won	
1997	Aafathis Awards - 1996	Best Dance	Niuma Mohamed	Won	
