= Hithi Thajuribaa =

Maldivian romantic drama television series

- Genre: Romantic drama
- Based on: Avaamendhuru by Aishath Neena
- Starring: Ali Shameel; Aminath Rasheedha; Niuma Mohamed
- No. of seasons: 1
- No. of episodes: 7

Original release
- Network: Television Maldives
- Release: 1994 – 1995

Hithi Thajuribaa is a Maldivian romantic drama television series developed for Television Maldives. The series stars Ali Shameel, Aminath Rasheedha and Niuma Mohamed in pivotal roles. Based on the novel Avaamendhuru published by Aishath Neena, the film follows the destruction of a happy family when an islander residing in the same house links up with the tenant.

== Premise ==
Saleem (Ali Shameel) and Asma (Aminath Rasheedha) marry despite their parent's refusal and continue to live a happy life with their three children. Asma has to undergo a severe operation and brings in her nephew, Shahula (Niuma Mohamed) to perform the daily chores in the house. Asma's operation is successful though the doctor advises the couple to refrain from having sex for a year. Shahula strongly determines to stay at Saleem's house as long as she can. Meanwhile, Saleem has a secret affair with Shahula. Realizing that Saleem is distancing from Asma, she informs Shahula that henceforth all the work which relates to Saleem will be personally handled by Asma. Complications arise, when Asma discovers their affair and is forced to helplessly watch.

== Cast and characters ==
=== Main ===
- Ali Shameel as Saleem
- Aminath Rasheedha as Asma
- Niuma Mohamed as Shahula

=== Recurring ===
- Arifa Ibrahim as Asma's sister-in-law
- Ibrahim Shakir as Asma's doctor
- Mariyam Shelin as Shifa
- Hawwa Enee as Hana
- Fathimath Mufliha as Zahira

== Soundtrack ==
Track listing
No.	Title	Lyrics	Singer(s)	Length
1.	"Reyrey Farudhaa"	Ahmed Shakeeb	Mohamed Shahuban
2.	"Dhen Mihen Bunelun Vakin"		Mohamed Shahidh, Aminath Ibrahim
3.	"Vaa Hithugaa Thi Baaru"	Fathimath Nahula	Mohamed Shahuban, Fathimath Zoona
