= Niuma Mohamed =

Maldivian actress, director, and producer (born 1977)

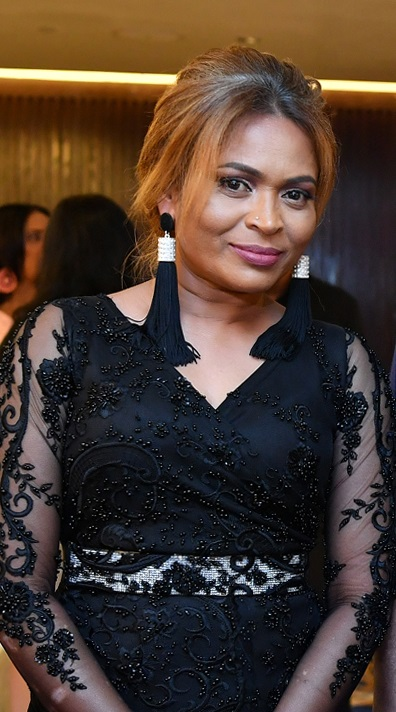
- Mohamed in 2019
- Born: 20 October 1977 (age 48); Vaadhoo
- Occupations: Actress, director, producer
- Years active: 1994–present
- Spouses: Ibrahim Habeeb (m. 2002; div. 2004); Ali Seezan (m. 2004; div. 2006); Hassan Ibrahim (m. 2007; div. 2014)
- Children: 1

Niuma Mohamed (pronounced [nɪʊˈmaː mʊɦəmːəɖʱ]; 20 October 1977) is a Maldivian film actress, director, and producer. The highest-paid actress in Maldives, Mohamed is the recipient of several awards, including two Gaumee Film Awards, and four Maldives Film Awards. She holds the record for collecting all three Maldives Film Awards for Best Actress in a feature film. In 2011, the Government of Maldives honoured her with the National Award of Recognition.

Mohamed was born in Vaadhoo and raised in Male'. After completing eight years of standard education, she dropped out of school and joined a taxi centre where a customer, a producer of Television Maldives, offered her to make her career debut with the drama series Hithi Thajuribaa (1994). Despite some criticism, she soon received several offers and starred in the horror film Fathis Handhuvaru (1997), which proved to be a breakthrough for her. She went on to act in several more horror films, including Zalzalaa (2000), Ginihila (2003), Dhonkamana (2003), Sandhuravirey 2 (2004), and Handhu Keytha (2005). Mohamed received her first Gaumee Film Award for Best Actress in 2007 with her portrayal of the tolerant second wife in Kalaayaanulaa (2003).

She was later noted for her portrayal of a devoted wife in Hiyani (2006), a schoolteacher in Fathimath Nahula's highest-grossing film, Yoosuf (2008), and in Hiyy Rohvaanulaa (2008), all of which resulted in Gaumee Film Award nominations. She established herself as the most prominent leading actress of Maldivian cinema in 2010 with the film Niuma, which also marked her directorial debut. She was bestowed with her second Gaumee Film Award for Best Actress along with a nomination as Best Director for this production; she won both the awards at 2nd Maldives Film Awards. Mohamed's success continued with the family dramas Maafeh Neiy (2010), Sazaa (2011), Mihashin Furaana Dhandhen (2012), Dhilakani (2013), and Aadheys (2014). Marking her twenty-year-long career, in 2017 she announced her retirement from acting and in 2019, she released the psychological thriller Nivairoalhi, her last onscreen film.

== Early life ==
Mohamed was born on 20 October 1977 in GDh. Vaadhoo, the youngest of six siblings. A die-hard fan of Amitabh Bachchan, Rekha, Aamir Khan, and Kajol, she frequently listened to Voice of Maldives and watched Bollywood films, which inspired her to become an actress.

Mohamed attended Maafannu Madharusa school and she calls her experience there a "joyous ride". She completed eight standard school years with no intention of studying further. In 1993, she worked in the Villingili government as her first job. The next year, she joined a taxi centre and four months later, she received a call from Mariyam Shauqee, a producer for Television Maldives, praising her voice and offering to cast Mohamed in one of her films. At the age of seventeen, the young actress made her career debut in Shaugee's television drama series Hithi Thajuribaa (1994) alongside Ali Shameel, Aminath Rasheedha, and Arifa Ibrahim. She later joined a class to complete her GCE Ordinary Level exam but instead "evaded" for a film shooting, using the money she saved up for her exam fee.

== Career ==
=== 1994–2002: Early releases ===
Once her talent was recognized with Hithi Thajuribaa, Mohamed was offered several other film roles. She first acted in the film Badhal (1996), though her first release was Hagu An'bi (1996). In the former, she starred alongside Hamid Ali, Hussain Sobah, and Waleedha Waleed while playing the role of Shiuna, the charismatic and intelligent teenage daughter of a wealthy businessman who is being duped in a series of unfortunate events. At the 1996 Aafathis Awards ceremony, Mohamed received the Best actress, Best Dance, and Best Performer awards. The same year, she starred opposite Arifa Ibrahim, Abdul Raheem, and Ibrahim Wisan in Mohamed Rasheed's Hifehettumeh Neiy Karuna, where she played the role of Thasneem, an orphan who has been mistreated and abused by her adoptive mother. This was followed by Yoosuf Rafeeu's comedy Nibu (1996), an unofficial remake of Gulzar's Bollywood comedy Angoor (1982), which focuses on two pairs of identical twins separated at birth and how their lives go haywire when they meet in adulthood.

Easa Shareef's horror film Fathis Handhuvaru (1997), where are starred opposite Reeko Moosa Manik, proved to be a breakthrough for Mohamed. The film tells the story of a married young woman who falls in love with a ghost. The film is celebrated as the most successful Maldivian film with the highest number of shows screened upon release. Mohamed then starred opposite Reeko Moosa Manik, Hassan Afeef, and Mariyam Nazima in Easa Shareef's Emme Fahu Dhuvas (2000), where she played a devious woman who spoils her best friend's upcoming marriage by creating false accusation and staging misleading impressions. The following year, she played the role of Mary, a devoted wife desperately seeking affection from her husband in Abdul Faththaah's television drama series Dhoapatta (2000). The series also featured Mohamed Shavin, Sheela Najeeb, and Jamsheedha Ahmed. Mohamed's collaboration with Faththaah was repeated the same year with another romantic drama series, Aisha, where she played the helpful friend of a young woman suffering from an abusive marriage. Mariyam Shauqee's widely acclaimed family drama television series Kahthiri was released in 1997; here Mohamed played the role of a doctor living in a congested housing complex while dealing with various social issues.

In 2000, Mohamed played Fazlee Shareef, an unattractive fun-loving tomboy who later transforms into a feminine and beautiful girl, and who is secretly in love with her best friend, in Hussain Adil's romance Hiyy Halaaku. The film was an unofficial remake of Karan Johar's romantic drama Kuch Kuch Hota Hai (1998), starring Shah Rukh Khan, Kajol, and Rani Mukerji. The Amjad Ibrahim-directed Ainbehge Loabi Firiehge Vaajib, starring Mohamed, Yoosuf Shafeeu, Jamsheedha Ahmed, and Arifa Ibrahim was released the same year. The film revolves around a woman who has been mistreated by her stepmother and forced to marry against her will. Mohamed played the role of Dhiyana, the caring friend of Julia, played by Jamsheedha Ahmed. This was followed by the year's most successful Maldivian film, Ahmed Nimal's horror classic Zalzalaa, in which Mohamed portrays the character of Shiuna Ibrahim, an innocent and amenable young woman who marries a divorcee.

In 2001, Mohamed starred as an aspiring model and an obsessive lover in Aslam Rasheed's romantic thriller film Dheevaanaa, which was an unofficial remake of Ram Gopal Varma's romantic thriller Pyaar Tune Kya Kiya (2001), starring Urmila Matondkar, Fardeen Khan, and Sonali Kulkarni. The same year, she acted in Aishath Ali Manik's Hiiy Edhenee, which was an unofficial remake of Dharmesh Darshan's romantic film Dhadkan (2000), starring Akshay Kumar, Suniel Shetty, and Shilpa Shetty in the lead roles. Cast opposite Ali Seezan, Sheela Najeeb, and Asad Shareef, Mohamed played the role of Leena, the partner of a wealthy businessman who secretly loves him for a long time.

=== 2003–05: Horror films ===
Niuma collaborated with Easa Shareef once again for another horror film, titled Ginihila (2003), alongside Ali Seezan, Mariyam Nisha, and Reeko Moosa Manik, playing the role of Suhana, a mentally unstable young girl who commits suicide when her boyfriend rejects her demand to leave his wife for her. The film is an unofficial remake of Vikram Bhatt's Indian horror film Raaz (2002), featuring Bipasha Basu, Dino Morea, Malini Sharma, and Ashutosh Rana, which itself is an unofficial adaptation of What Lies Beneath. Mohamed next worked with Amjad Ibrahim on his horror film Dhonkamana (2003), which depicts the romantic relationship between a young man (played by Yoosuf Shafeeu) and an old woman (played by Fauziyya Hassan). Featuring Hassan, Yoosuf Shafeeu, Sheela Najeeb, Sheereen Abdul Wahid, Amira Ismail, and Aminath Rasheedha, the film received mainly negative reviews from critics, though its inclusion of the theme portraying the relationship between a couple with a large age gap was praised. Mohamed was later applauded for her performance as Faraha, an empowered, wealthy business woman who makes it her life's mission to break up a happy marriage in the Abdul Faththaah-directed critically acclaimed television series Thiyey Mihithuge Vindhakee (2003).

Mohamed's most successful release of the year 2003 was Fathimath Nahula's romantic film Kalaayaanulaa, which tells the story of a man (Yoosuf Shafeeu) who decides to marry his childhood best friend (played by Mohamed) when his wife (Aishath Shiranee) fails to please him sexually. The film received widespread critical acclaim for its performances and was declared the year's highest-grossing Maldivian film. Mohamed's portrayal of the tolerant second wife garnered her a Miadhu Crystal Award for Best Actress and a Gaumee Film Award for Best Actress. This was followed by Abdul Faththaah's Aan... Aharenves Loabivin (2002), starring Mohamed, alongside Ali Seezan, Sheela Najeeb, Aminath Rasheedha, and Neena Saleem. Mohamed played the role of Suzy, an ill-fated girl who is forced to conceal her marriage in order to help her friend recovering from amnesia. The film opened to positive responses from critics and was commercially successful as well.

Mohamed next starred as a fangirl of an established actor in Amjad Ibrahim's next directorial venture, Sandhuravirey 2 (2004), a sequel to his 2002 horror film Sandhuravirey, which presented Yoosuf Shafeeu and Mariyam Nisha in the lead roles. The film follows a jinn avenging the death of its mother and sister. Similar to its prequel, the film received negative responses from critics.

In 2005, Mohamed starred alongside Ali Seezan and Sheereen Abdul Wahid in Ahmed Nimal's horror film Handhu Keytha (2005), which tells the story of a man who is enchanted by a spirit while witnessing a lunar eclipse. Mohamed then stepped into Fathimath Nahula's critically and commercially successful romantic drama television series Kalaage Haqqugaa, to play the role of Aishath Imna, a sacrificing mother and an orphan who is later abandoned by her guardian. Mohamed rose to widespread prominence in the television industry with her performance as an indolent daughter who marries her best friend in the Arifa Ibrahim-directed critically acclaimed television series Vairoalhi Ahves Sirrun in 2005. The story revolves around two best friends involved in extramarital affairs who fail to perform their duties as husband and wife. The show, which also included Lufshan Shakeeb, Ahmed Asim, Aminath Rasheedha, and Mariyam Shakeela, was listed as one of the most successful television series.

=== 2006–09: Critical and commercial success ===
In April 2006, Ahmed Nimal's revenge thriller Hiyani was released, featuring Mohamed as a devoted wife who seeks comfort in the company of her husband's kidnapper. The film received mostly positive reviews from critics. Mohamed's performance fetched her another Gaumee Film Award nomination for Best Actress. This was followed by Amjad Ibrahim's romantic drama film Hithuge Edhun (2006), which tells the story of a disabled man, with Mohamed playing the role of Shaniya, the man's caring wife who hides the truth of her first marriage. This resulted in another Gaumee Film Award nomination for Best Actress. The same year, Mohamed again collaborated with the team from Vairoalhi Ahves Sirrun, in Arifa Ibrahim's new romantic television drama series Vaguthu Faaithu Nuvanees. The series, which follows the story of two best friends who both love the same person, features Mohamed in the role of one of the friends, who pursues her revenge for the betrayal she feels she has experienced.

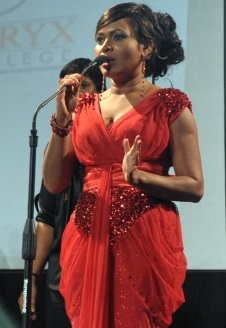
Mohamed at the 1st Maldives Film Awards ceremony, 2011

In 2008, Mohamed appeared in Fathimath Nahula's romantic drama film Yoosuf, which depicts the story of a deaf-mute man (played by Yoosuf Shafeeu) who has been mistreated and mocked by a wealthy family for his disability. The film featured an ensemble cast including Yoosuf Shafeeu, Sheela Najeeb, Mohamed Manik, Ahmed Nimal, Fauziyya Hassan, Ravee Farooq, Zeenath Abbas, and Ahmed Lais Asim, who were at the time the biggest names in Maldivian cinema. Mohamed played the wife of the titular character and regarded her role to be one of the most challenging she had taken on throughout her career, since most of her dialogue needed to be "audible and expressive in gestures". The film received widespread critical acclaim and attained blockbuster status at the box office, making it one of the all-time highest-grossing movies in the Maldives. It was also the Maldivian official entry at the 2009 SAARC Film Festival and had the privilege of being the festival's opening feature. Mohamed's performance earned her a Gaumee Film Awards nomination for Best Actress, and she won a Maldives Film Award in the same category.

Mohamed had four releases in 2009. Her first film of the year was Yoosuf Shafeeu's Hiyy Rohvaanulaa, where she featured alongside Shafeeu, Abdulla Muaz, and Nadhiya Hassan. The film follows a blind man who regains his eyesight but decides to conceal this and continue presenting as blind in order to discover his wife's affair with another man. Mohamed played the role of Zeeshan, a schoolteacher trapped in her previous relationship with a ruthless man. The film received favorable reviews from critics and was a commercial success. For her performance in the film, Mohamed received a nominations for Best Actress at the 6th Gaumee Film Awards and the 1st Maldives Film Awards ceremony.

The same year, the actress played a naive woman who is brutally raped by her brother-in-law, in Ahmed Nimal's drama E Dharifulhu, which featured an ensemble cast including Yoosuf Shafeeu, Mohamed Manik, Sheela Najeeb, and Ahmed Nimal. At the 1st Maldives Film Awards, Mohamed received her third nomination as Best Actress for her performance in the film. She next appeared in Ali Shifau's suspense thriller Happy Birthday, which narrates the story of a simple man who receives a call on his birthday informing him that his wife and son have been kidnapped for ransom. Mohamed played the role of Suza, the man's wife. The film was a commercial failure, despite a positive response from critics. It won five Gaumee Film Awards and twelve Maldives Film Awards and was also screened at the Venice Film Festival. In her last release of the year, Mohamed starred opposite Ali Seezan and Nadhiya Hassan in Seezan's melodrama Karuna Vee Beyvafa. The film follows a happily married couple who learn that the wife cannot bear children, and the collapse of their relationship following this.

=== 2010–13: Niuma and further success ===
Mohamed's first release of 2010 was Ali Seezan's family drama Maafeh Neiy, where she appeared alongside Seezan and Koyya Hassan Manik. The film highlights many social issues including human rights abuses, forced marriage, and domestic violence. Mohamed plays the role of Seema, a woman who has been ill-treated by her two daughters. The film was criticised for its melodrama, though critics found Mohamed to be the "saving grace of the film". Other critics expressed disappointment to "witness a middling acting [from] the all-time best actress". The film fetched her a nomination for Best Actress at the 2nd Maldives Film Awards. In her next release of the year, a family drama by Ali Shifau, Dhin Veynuge Hithaamaigaa, Mohamed featured in dual roles—as Nisha, an aspiring model who has been tormented by tempestuous in-laws, and as Aminath, a woman who dies during childbirth. The film and her performance received positive responses from critics.

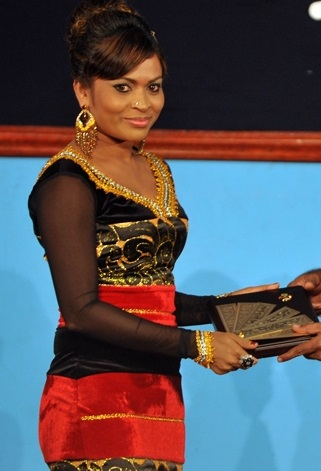
Mohamed receiving the National Award of Recognition, 2011

Mohamed next starred opposite Yoosuf Shafeeu, Sheela Najeeb, and Mohamed Manik in Ahmed Nimal's horror film Zalzalaa En'buri Aun. It was a spin-off of Aslam Rasheed's horror classic Zalzalaa (2000). The film revolves around a mariage blanc, the murder of a man by his wife, and the avenging of his death. Mohamed played the role of a spirit who falls in love with the lead character and later seeks vengeance for his murder. The film received mixed responses from critics and had a mediocre performance at the box office. Later in 2010, Mohamed appeared alongside Yoosuf Shafeeu and Amira Ismail in Veeraana, a drama film that deals with child sexual abuse. She played the role of Reena, a woman who dies during childbirth. The film received mixed-to-positive reviews from critics, who praised the writer and director for tackling a sensitive topic but criticized the "over-the-top melodrama". The production proved to be a commercial success, however. Mohamed next reunited with Ahmed Nimal in his horror film The Three, which received negative reviews from critics and was declared to be a box office disaster. She also appeared in Amjad Ibrahim's romantic horror film Vakinuvinama, which was another critical and commercial failure.

The actress followed this with her directorial debut, the drama Niuma, which featured her in the titular role, alongside an ensemble cast including Yoosuf Shafeeu, Sheela Najeeb, Mohamed Manik, Ahmed Nimal, Aminath Rasheedha, and Abdulla Muaz. The project made Mohamed the highest-paid actress in the history of Maldivian cinema. In an interview, she stated, "I sacrificed my hair to make a scene audiences will be thrilled to watch. I assure everyone that, if this film is not appreciated, I will leave the industry once and for all". The film was met with critical acclaim, specifically complimenting the performance and dialogue. Ahmed Naif from Sun wrote: "Niuma's acting is the best I have seen from a Maldivian film. In the scene where Nimal cuts her hair, she brought the perfect expression and emotions to it, nobody else could have justified the role as she did". The film went on to become the highest-grossing Maldivian release of the year and fetched Mohamed several accolades, including Best Director and Best Actress awards at the 2nd Maldives Film Awards. She also won the Best Actress award at the 6th Gaumee Film Awards ceremony, while being nominated for Best Director.

Mohamed began 2011 with Hussain Munawwar's directorial debut, Sazaa, opposite Ismail Rasheed and Lufshan Shakeeb. The story revolves around a carefree woman whose life it turned upside down when she is forced to marry a brutal man. Mohamed earned mostly positive comments for her performance as the lead character. Critically well received, the film emerged as a commercial success. Mohamed's performance fetched her a Best Actress nomination at the 7th Gaumee Film Awards. She followed this success by appearing in Ali Shifau's psychological romantic thriller Zaharu, alongside Ali Seezan and Sheela Najeeb. The film centers around a married man who has a brief affair with a woman who becomes obsessed with him. Mohamed played the role of Aminath, a woman who finds out about her husband's extramarital affair. The film was inspired by the Adrian Lyne-directed American erotic thriller Fatal Attraction (1987). Zaharu received mixed responses from critics and was declared a flop at the box office. Apart from featuring in an item number in Hamid Ali's Laelaa, Mohamed went on to star alongside Aishath Rishmy, Ali Seezan, Ahmed Azmeel, and Aminath Rasheedha in Azmeel's debut, Hiyy Yaara Dheefa. The film received negative reviews from critics, pointing out similarities between the Bollywood comedy-drama film Ishq (1997) and Kundan Shah's family drama Dil Hai Tumhaara (2002). Mohamed played Anju, an adopted daughter craving love. The film did not succeed financially, but her portrayal was moderately acclaimed by critics.

In 2012, the actress played a physiotherapist in Ravee Farooq romantic drama film Mihashin Furaana Dhandhen, opposite Mohamed Manik and Ali Seezan. The film received mixed responses from critics, while Mohamed's performance was reviewed positively. Ahmed Nadheem of Haveeru noted the film as "the best Maldivian melodramatic film" he had seen in the past two years, though he was displeased with its similarities to two Bollywood films. Mohamed's portrayal of Saara in the film resulted in another Gaumee Film Award nomination for Best Actress. The following year, she again collaborated with Munawwar for his second production, the revenge thriller film Dhilakani, along with Ismail Rasheed, Mohamed Manik, Mohamed Faisal, and Aminath Rishfa. The film deals with a man's tumultuous journey to seek vengeance and the demolition of a family bond over a girl. Mohamed played the love interest of three siblings. The film attracted negative reviews from critics: Nadheem wrote, "Embraced with futile characters, impractical scenes and outdated music, the film has problems in each department. Munawwar failed to extract the talent of actors like [Niuma Mohamed], who is the most accomplished actress in the industry". Mohamed was bestowed with the Best Actress award at the 3rd Maldives Film Awards.

=== 2014–present: Professional expansion ===
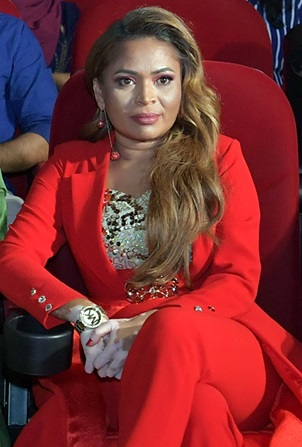
Mohamed at the 9th Gaumee Film Awards ceremony, 2019

Mohamed's first release of 2014 was Mohamed Nimal's family drama Aniyaa, alongside Ismail Rasheed and Mohamed Jumayyil. The story revolves around a boy who has been deprived of love by his parents. Due to several technical errors and struggles caused during the screening of the film, it failed to garner enough hype, ultimately performing poorly at the box office. It was followed by another family drama, Aadheys, directed by Abdul Faththaah and starring Hussain Sobah, Amira Ismail, Moosa Zakariyya, Fathimath Azifa, and Ali Azim in pivotal roles. The film tells the story of a sacrificing mother and her affection towards her child. Filming was completed in 2011, though it was released three years later due to the death of producer Hassain Ali. The film received mixed reviews from critics and failed to leave an impression commercially. In a review, Ismail Naail wrote: "As expected, Niuma leaves less room for criticism though her character and its portrayal can still be improved". At the 8th Gaumee Film Awards, Mohamed received a nomination for Best Supporting Actress and Best Actress for the two films, respectively.

In 2015, the actress made a special appearance in Ali Seezan's action film Ahsham, where she played the role of Ali Seezan's wife who dies in a car accident. The film, made on a budget of MVR 1,500,000, was considered as the most expensive film made in the Maldives. It was one of three entries from the Maldives to the SAARC Film Festival in 2016. The following year, Mohamed featured alongside Yoosuf Shafeeu in Ibrahim Wisan's debut, Vee Beyvafa. The film received negative responses from critics, with Ahmed Adhushan of Mihaaru calling it "a step backward" in the progress of cinema.

In 2017, Mohamed made a special appearance in the romantic comedy film Naughty 40 and also produced the film alongside Ismail Shafeeq. She featured alongside an ensemble cast including Yoosuf Shafeeu, Mohamed Manik, Ahmed Saeed, and Ali Seezan, playing the role of Niufa. The film met with both critical and commercial success, emerging as one of the highest-grossing Maldivian films of 2017. On 20 October 2017, a grand event was held to celebrate Mohamed's twenty-year-long career, at which she presented her upcoming psychological thriller Nivairoalhi and announced her retirement from acting.

Released in 2019, the film was produced by Mohamed herself and directed by Moomin Fuad. Starring opposite Yoosuf Shafeeu and Ahmed Asim, the actress gained weight in preparation for her role and faced major delays in post-production since she was suffering from laryngitis. The film received majorly positive reviews from critics: Aishath Maaha of Dho? favored the performance of the lead actors and mentioned the "neat arrangement" of its screenplay, though pointing out its "weak ending". Praising her performance as a patient suffering from depression, Maaha wrote: "On a positive note, this is the most natural acting Niuma has portrayed so far in her career. However, it surely breaks several hearts to realize that we will no longer see such a marvelous performance from her in any film to come". Later that year, the first Maldivian anthology film was released, featuring Mohamed as the helpless wife of a drug dealer in a segment directed by Fuad, titled "Baiveriya". The project was shot in 2013 and digitally released six years later due to several delays in post-production.

== Personal life ==
Mohamed's first marriage was to Ibrahim Habeeb in 2002. The couple were divorced shortly after, and few years later, Habeeb was found dead, having committed suicide.

In September 2002, Mohamed and actor Ali Seezan were accused of having an extramarital affair after being apprehended while together alone in a locked, darkened room. They were subsequently convicted and publicly flogged. Mohamed was also sentenced to eight months of house arrest while Seezan was sentenced to eight months banishment to an uninhabited island (a form of punishment in the Maldives). Two years later, in 2004, Mohamed and Seezan got married. Similar to her previous marriage, the couple were divorced in the span of a few months.

Mohamed has been diagnosed with vitiligo, which results in white patches on the skin. She went to Sri Lanka for treatment and experienced major improvements. She has spoken of the condition, saying: "I was being told by producers and directors to color-match the pale skin with normal skin with the help of make-up. I accepted their terms during the earlier stages of my condition".

The actress was romantically linked with Hassan Ibrahim while filming a project together, and they were married in 2007. On 21 July 2008, Mohamed gave birth to a daughter, Mariyam Zoya Hassan. After a few years, the couple divorced and Mohamed decided to stay single to take care of her daughter.

In February 2018, she announced her interest to run as a parliament member. In an interview, she stated: "I have always been fond of politics. The knowledge I hold and my ability will be proved once I join politics. In fact, I always get myself involved in political conversations, so I am aware of our political crisis and definitely not new to this environment".

== Media image ==
Mohamed is considered among the most popular and high-profile celebrities in Maldives. Following the success of Kalaayaanulaa, Yoosuf, Hiyy Rohvaanulaa, and Niuma, her film roles were subject to wide commercial analysis. In 2010, Niuma was cited as the most successful leading actress and highest-paid actress in the Maldives. She has endorsed several brands and products throughout her career. In 2012, she was ranked second in the list of "Best Actresses in Maldives", compiled by Haveeru. The following year, she was voted in the top three as the "Most Entertaining Actress" in the SunFM Awards 2010, an award ceremony launched by Sun Media Group to honour the most recognized personalities in different fields from the previous year. In 2018, Mohamed was ranked first on Dho?'s list of Top Ten Actresses of Maldives, with writer Aishath Maaha opining that Mohamed has "achieved every possible success anyone can get from this small industry".

== Filmography ==
=== Film ===
Year	Title	Role	Notes	Ref(s)
1996	Hagu An'bi	Rahuma		
1996	Hifehettumeh Neiy Karuna	Thasneem		
1996	Badhal	Shiuna	Aafathis Award for Best Actress	
1996	Niboo	Muneera		
1997	Fathis Handhuvaru	Zoona	Aafathis Award for Best Actress	
1998	Huvafen			
1998	Dhauvaa	Seema Hassan		
1999	Farudhaa			
2000	Hiyy Halaaku	Fazlee Shareef		
2000	Ainbehge Loabi Firiehge Vaajib	Dhiyana		
2000	Emme Fahu Dhuvas	Azeeza		
2000	Zalzalaa	Shiuna Ibrahim		
2000	Namoonaa			
2001	Dheevaanaa	Lamya Anwar		
2001	Hiiy Edhenee	Leena		
2001	Hilihilaa	Zaina		
2002	Aan... Aharenves Loabivin	Suzy		
2003	Ginihila	Suhana		
2003	Kalaayaanulaa	Eenaz	Gaumee Film Award for Best Actress	
2003	Dhonkamana	Zaana		
2004	Dharinnahtakai	Moonisa	Nominated— Gaumee Film Award for Best Actress	
2004	Sandhuravirey 2	Maya		
2004	Hama Himeyn	Aminath		
2005	Handhu Keytha	Shuha		
2006	Hithuge Edhun	Shaniya	Nominated—Gaumee Film Award for Best Actress	
2006	Hiyani	Shaina	Nominated—Gaumee Film Award for Best Actress	
2008	Yoosuf	Usha Yasir	Nominated—Gaumee Film Award for Best Actress; Maldives Film Award for Best Actress	
2009	Hiyy Rohvaanulaa	Zeeshan	Nominated—Gaumee Film Award for Best Actress; Nominated—Maldives Film Award for Best Actress	
2009	Karuna Vee Beyvafa	Shimla Ali		
2009	E Dharifulhu	Maisha	Nominated—Maldives Film Award for Best Actress	
2009	Happy Birthday	Suza		
2010	Maafeh Neiy	Seema	Nominated—Maldives Film Award for Best Actress	
2010	Dhin Veynuge Hithaamaigaa	Nisha/Ainth		
2010	Zalzalaa En'buri Aun	Unnamed		
2010	Veeraana	Reena		
2010	Niuma	Niuma	Also the director Gaumee Film Award for Best Actress; Nominated—Gaumee Film Award for Best Director; Maldives Film Award for Best Actress; Maldives Film Award for Best Director	
2010	Vakinuvinama	Rashaga		
2011	Sazaa	Reema	Nominated—Gaumee Film Award for Best Actress	
2011	Zaharu	Aminath		
2011	Laelaa	Herself	Special appearance in the item song	
2011	Hiyy Yaara Dheefa	Anju		
2012	Mihashin Furaana Dhandhen	Saara	Nominated—Gaumee Film Award for Best Actress	
2013	Dhilakani	Lara	Maldives Film Award for Best Actress	
2014	Aniyaa	Mizna	Nominated—Gaumee Film Award for Best Supporting Actress	
2014	Aadheys	Nifasha	Nominated—Gaumee Film Award for Best Actress	
2015	Ahsham	Ina	Special appearance	
2016	Vee Beyvafa	Riyasha		
2017	Naughty 40	Niufa	Special appearance Also the producer	
2019	Nivairoalhi	Mana Rasheed	Also the producer	

=== Television ===
Year	Title	Role	Notes	Ref(s)
1994	Hithi Thajuribaa	Shahula	Main role	
1997–1999	Kahthiri	Shiyana	Main role; 28 episodes	
1998	Leenaa	Leena		
1998–1999	Aisha	Shaama	Main role; 10 episodes	
1999–2000	Maafkuraashey	Niuma	Main role; 10 episodes	
2000	Dhoapatta	Mary	Main role; 3 episodes	
2001	Dhanmaanu	Rugiyya 'Rugy'		
2003–2005	Thiyey Mihithuge Vindhakee	Farahanaz	Main role; 18 episodes	
2004	Vaisoori	Fareedha / Afeefa	In the segments "Kurin Visnaa Dhevunu Nama" and "An'dhiri Hayaaiy"	
2004	Vahum	Muna	Television film	
2004–2005	Loabi Nulibunas	Fazna	Main role; 12 episodes	
2005	Kalaage Haqqugaa	Aishath Imna	Main role	
2005	Baiveriyaa	Nuzuha	Main role; 14 episodes	
2005–2006	Vairoalhi Ahves Sirrun	Mariyam Shaanee	Main role; 52 episodes	
2006	Beywafaa Viyas			
2006	Saaraa			
2006–2007	Vaguthu Faaithu Nuvanees	Sama	Main role; 50 episodes	
2007	Reyfanaa	Yumna	Main role; 14 episodes	
2008	Inthihaa	Shimla	Main role; 13 episodes	
2009	Mohamma Gaadiyaa	Raqeeba	Main role; 5 episodes	
2011	Naamaan	Hudha	Main role; 4 episodes	
2012	Dhirumeh Nethas	Hudha	Main role; 5 episodes	
2019	Ehenas	Rayan's aunt	Voice-over; Guest role	
2019	Hatharu Halha	Hawwa	In the segment "Baiveriya"	
2019–2020	Maayoos	Asma	Main role; 13 episodes	

=== Short film ===
Year	Title	Role	Notes	Ref(s)
2005	Falhi Sikunthu 2	Nurse		
2006	Dheke Dhekeves 4	Burnerz		
2006	Mission 24			
2006	Handi Ganduvaru Dhonkamana	Kamana		
2007	An'dhiri Rey			
2007	Handi Ganduvaru Dhonkamana 2½	Kamana / Kamana's mother		
2007	Paneeno	Malmal / Yazeelio		
2007	Fahu Sofha	Sana	Gaumee Film Award for Best Actress - Short Film	
2008	Erey	Afaa		
2009	Kafun	Nizu		
2010	The Tree			
2012	13 Ah Visnaa Dhehaas	Mariyam Zeeniya	Nominated—Gaumee Film Award for Best Actress - Short Film; Nominated—Maldives Film Award for Best Actress - Short Film	
2012	Kidnap	Nahu		
2020	KKB: Kuda Kuda Baaru	Zoona		

=== Other work ===
Year	Title	Director	Producer	Notes	Ref(s)
2008	Umurah Salaam		Yes	Short film; co-produced with Ali Sofeeh	
2010	Niuma	Yes		Feature film	
2017	Naughty 40		Yes	Feature film; co-produced with Ismail Shafeeq	
2017	Hahdhu		Yes	Feature film; co-produced with Abdul Faththaah	
2019	Nivairoalhi		Yes	Feature film	
2023	Kalhaki		Yes	Feature film	

== Accolades ==
Year	Award	Category	Nominated work	Result	Ref(s)
1997	Aafathis Awards – 1996	Best Actress	Badhal	Won	
1997	Aafathis Awards – 1996	Best Performer of the Year	Badhal	Won	
1997	Aafathis Awards – 1996	Best Dance	Badhal	Won	
1998	Aafathis Awards – 1997	Best Actress	Fathis Handhuvaru	Won	
2007	3rd Gaumee Film Awards	Best Actress	Fathis Handhuvaru	Nominated	
2007	1st Miadhu Crystal Awards	Best Actress	Kalaayaanulaa	Won	
2007	4th Gaumee Film Awards	Best Actress	Kalaayaanulaa	Won	
2007	4th Gaumee Film Awards	Best Actress	Dharinnahtakai	Nominated	
2008	5th Gaumee Film Awards	Best Actress	Hiyani	Nominated	
2008	5th Gaumee Film Awards	Best Actress	Hithuge Edhun	Nominated	
2008	5th Gaumee Film Awards	Best Actress - Short Film	Fahu Sofha	Won	
2011	1st Maldives Film Awards	Best Actress	Yoosuf	Won	
2011	1st Maldives Film Awards	Best Actress	E Dharifulhu	Nominated	
2011	1st Maldives Film Awards	Best Actress	Hiyy Rohvaanulaa	Nominated	
2011	2nd SunFM Awards	Most Entertaining Actress		Nominated	
2011	National Award of Recognition	Performing Arts - Acting		Won	
2012	2nd Maldives Film Awards	Best Director	Niuma	Won	
2012	2nd Maldives Film Awards	Best Actress	Niuma	Won	
2012	2nd Maldives Film Awards	Best Actress	Maafeh Neiy	Nominated	
2014	3rd Maldives Film Awards	Best Actress	Dhilakani	Won	
2014	3rd Maldives Film Awards	Best Actress	Mihashin Furaana Dhandhen	Nominated	
2014	3rd Maldives Film Awards	Best Actress - Short film	13 Ah Visnaa Dhehaas	Nominated	
2014	3rd Maldives Film Awards	Best Makeup - Short film	13 Ah Visnaa Dhehaas (Shared with Fathimath Azifa)	Nominated	
2015	6th Gaumee Film Awards	Best Director	Niuma	Nominated	
2015	6th Gaumee Film Awards	Best Actress	Niuma	Won	
2015	6th Gaumee Film Awards	Best Actress	Hiyy Rohvaanulaa	Nominated	
2015	6th Gaumee Film Awards	Best Actress	Yoosuf	Nominated	
2015	6th Gaumee Film Awards	Best Costume Design	Hiyy Rohvaanulaa (shared with Mohamed Abdulla)	Nominated	
2016	7th Gaumee Film Awards	Best Actress	Mihashin Furaana Dhandhen	Nominated	
2016	7th Gaumee Film Awards	Best Actress	Sazaa	Nominated	
2016	7th Gaumee Film Awards	Best Makeup	Sazaa (Shared with Fathimath Azifa)	Nominated	
2017	8th Gaumee Film Awards	Best Actress	Aadheys	Nominated	
2017	8th Gaumee Film Awards	Best Supporting Actress	Aniyaa	Nominated	
2017	8th Gaumee Film Awards	Best Actress - Short film	13 Ah Visnaa Dhehaas	Nominated	
2025	1st MSPA Film Awards	Best Lead Actor – Female	Nivairoalhi	Won	
