= Handhu Keytha =

- Official film poster
- Directed by: Ahmed Nimal
- Written by: Ibrahim Waheed
- Screenplay by: Ibrahim Waheed
- Produced by: Shiham Rasheed
- Starring: Ali Seezan; Niuma Mohamed; Sheereen Abdul Wahid
- Cinematography: Ahmed Shaniz
- Edited by: Ahmed Nimal
- Music by: Imad Ismail
- Production company: Motion Pictures
- Release date: April 13, 2005
- Country: Maldives
- Language: Dhivehi

Handhu Keytha is a 2005 Maldivian horror film directed by Ahmed Nimal. Produced by Shiham Rasheed under Motion Pictures, the film stars Ali Seezan, Niuma Mohamed and Sheereen Abdul Wahid in pivotal roles. Shooting of the film took place in ADh. Mahibadhoo.

== Plot ==
On the night before the lunar eclipse, Ziyan (Ali Seezan) and Shuha (Niuma Mohamed) were staying on the beach when Shuha senses the presence of a third person and kept begging Ziyan to go back to their house. When Ziyan refuses to move, Shuha left him alone on the beach and he was soon accompanied by a woman in red dress, Azza (Sheereen Abdul Wahid), unsuspicious to Ziyan. Thinking it was Shuha, he requested Azza to meet him at the beach on the night of the lunar eclipse. Since his friend Shahid (Ahmed Asim) was too sick to go with him that night, Ziyan went to the beach alone and was soon joined by Azza. He flirts with her and gets a little intimate with her.

Shuha leaves to Male' for few days while Ziyan keeps frequently meeting with Azza. One night, Shahid follows Ziyan and witnessed him alone on the beach. When Ziyan went to pee, Shahid splashes mouthful of water and accidentally hits Azza who was standing nearby him, vanished to Shahid. In anger, Azza spits on him burning his face. Ziyan fails to introduce Azza to Shahid since he was unable to see and hear her. One day, Ziyan visits a friend of his sister Muna (Amira Ismail to fetch a book she requested. In the house, he observes a photograph of Azza whom he was informed to be dead many years ago while she was pushed off the roof in a dispute and revenge cycle between two families over the ownership of a house.

Shuha returns to the island but Ziyan kept avoiding Shuha since Azza has warned him to stay away from Shuha. Shahid was murdered by Azza when he tried to interfere in the matter. Azza approves Shuha and Ziyan's marriage on one condition; decorating his room in red colour since it will help in Ziyan's reminiscences of her. Shuha tries to seduce him several times, but he resists the temptation. Azza was outraged when a friend of Shuha, a businessman and a spell-maker, Hameed (Ahmed Nimal) enters the house. Suspicious of supernatural events, Shuha follows religious acts, reciting Quran and opening TV during prayer times which Ziyan disapproves.

One night, Shuha wakes up at midnight witnessing Ziyan talking to himself. Guided by Hameed, Shuha secretly places an amulet under his pillow, enraging Azza. Unable to bear the pain, she threw away the amulet. Azza forewarns Ziyan to break the TV, restrict Shuha talking to Hameed and burn the amulet if anyone of them wishes to survive. Instead, Ziyan agreed to tie another amulet on his hand breaking all the restraint. Azza avenged his rebellion by making Shuha pregnant and accusing the father to be Hameed. Furious, Ziyan breaks the amulet and he was killed by Azza while his unusual death was rumored to be due to extreme loss of blood. Traumatized of her husband's death, on the same night, Shuha is proposed by Hameed to marry him in exchange of protection from any evil spirit.

The same night, Azza kills Hameed leaving no one to protect Shuha but herself. She was soon revealed to be pregnant. With the help of her friend, a nurse, Liusha (Neena Saleem), it was revealed that the fetus would not grow into a human rather to an insect or any other species and she will slowly die of its poison insider her. Surprisingly, Shuha gives birth to an octopus and she perceives it as a premature baby. Another spell-maker Saud incinerates Azza. While Shuha went to see Bashiboalha Tournament, her father-in-law attempted to kill the octopus and fails when it hid in the toilet. Shuha returns home and once she opens the toilet lid, she was brutally killed by the octopus. Muna enters the room to pour a spellbound glass of water into the toilet and was astounded to see Shuha murdered in the bathroom. The octopus then attacks Muna and possesses her.

== Cast ==
- Ali Seezan as Ziyan
- Niuma Mohamed as Shuha
- Sheereen Abdul Wahid as Azza
- Ahmed Asim as Shahid
- Amira Ismail as Muna
- Neena Saleem as Liusha
- Ahmed Nimal as Hameed
- Fauziyya Hassan as Shuha's mother

== Soundtrack ==
Track listing
No.	Title	Singer(s)	Length
1.	"Thi Farudhaa Nagaashey"	Abdul Baaree, Shifa Thaufeeq
2.	"Libeythee Ufaa Migothah"	Hassan Ilham, Shifa Thaufeeq
3.	"Loabi Ummeedhu Dhinhaa"	Shifa Thaufeeq
