= Diary (Maldivian TV series) =

- Genre: Romantic drama
- Created by: Redline Movies
- Written by: Mariyam Moosa
- Screenplay by: Mariyam Moosa
- Starring: Mariyam Zuhura; Lufshan Shakeeb; Aminath Shareef; Ali Firaq
- No. of seasons: 1
- No. of episodes: 4

Production
- Producers: Aminath Athifa Ali; Nava
- Cinematography: Ali Shafau
- Running time: 23–25 minutes

Original release
- Network: Television Maldives
- Release: August 16, 2010 – 6 September 2010

Diary is a Maldivian romantic drama television mini-series developed for Television Maldives by Ahmed Shah. The series stars Mariyam Zuhura, Lufshan Shakeeb, Ali Firaq and Aminath Shareef in pivotal roles.

== Premise ==
Rishna moves to Male' for higher studies and stays with Maleeha (Aminath Shareef) and her son Mazin (Lufshan Shakeeb). One night, Mazin's uncle, Majeed (Ali Firaq), attempts to sexually abuse Rishna while Mazin successfully stops him though injuring himself in the process. Several medical tests suggest that Mazin has a blood clot in the brain and needs immediate medical attention. Maleeha plans to arrange Rishna and Mazin's marriage much to Majeed's disappointment.

== Cast ==
- Mariyam Zuhura as Rishna
- Lufshan Shakeeb as Mazin
- Aminath Shareef as Maleeha
- Ali Firaq as Majeed
- Hawwa Riyasha
- Ahmed Saeed as Azim
- Rashad Mohamed
- Mohamed Shiyam

== Soundtrack ==
Track listing
No.	Title	Lyrics	Music	Singer(s)	Length
1.	"Hithu Loabi Hithaa Vakivee Kamaku"	Mohamed Abdul Ghanee	Ibrahim Zaid Ali	Mariyam Ashfa, Ibrahim Zaid Ali
