= Kaiveni =

Maldivian drama television mini-series

- Genre: Romantic drama
- Written by: Moosa Saaid
- Directed by: Abdul Faththaah
- Music by: Ibrahim Nifar
- No. of seasons: 1
- No. of episodes: 4

Production
- Producer: Abdul Faththaah
- Cinematography: Shivaz Abdulla
- Editor: Ahmed Ziya
- Running time: 23–25 minutes
- Production company: Red Production

Original release
- Release: 3 August – 23 August 2012

Kaiveni is a Maldivian romantic drama television mini-series developed for Television Maldives by Abdul Faththaah. The series stars Mariyam Zuhura, Ali Azim, Neena Saleem and Yooshau Jameel in pivotal roles. The series was aired on 3 August 2012 on the occasion of 1433 Ramadan.

== Cast ==
- Mariyam Zuhura as Firasha
- Ali Azim as Nawal
- Neena Saleem as Zahidha
- Yooshau Jameel as Rashad
- Mohamed Rifshan as Rifshan
- Roanu Hassan Manik as Firasha's father
- Noorannahaaru as Shafiya; Firasha's mother
- Aishath Rasheedha as Husna; Zahidha's friend
- Ahmed Ziya as Assad; Nawal's friend

== Episodes ==
No. overall	No. in season	Title	Directed by	Original release date
1	1	"Episode 1"	Abdul Faththaah	August 3, 2012
Nawal (Ali Azim), a boy who was raised in a troubled family marries a middle class devout religious young woman Firasha (Mariyam Zuhura). Nawal spends most of the time with his friends, failing his responsibilities as a husband, due to the continuous quarrel between his parents. His mother, Zahidha (Neena Saleem), accuses her husband, Rashad (Yooshau Jameel), of having extramarital affairs.
2	2	"Episode 2"	Abdul Faththaah	August 9, 2012
Firasha agonized about her husband, informs his parents that Nawal spent the whole night with his friends. Nawal overhears the conversation and warns Firasha for crossing her boundary line as a wife. Zahidha's friend feeds an information to her which leads her to become more suspicious about Rashad. A heated argument between them leads Rashad to divorce Zahidha.
3	3	"Episode 3"	Abdul Faththaah	August 16, 2012
4	4	"Episode 4"	Abdul Faththaah	August 20, 2012
5	5	"Episode 5"	Abdul Faththaah	August 23, 2012

== Soundtrack ==
Track listing
No.	Title	Singer(s)	Length
1.	"Title song"	Shifa Thaufeeq
