= Sheereen Abdul Wahid =

Maldivian film actress

Sheereen Abdul Wahid is a Maldivian film actress.

== Career ==
Wahid made her film debut in Ali Shameel's drama film Hithi Nimun (2001) featuring opposite Mohamed Shavin and Mariyam Nisha, which follows the storyline of a stubborn young man who abandons his girlfriend when he discovers about her pregnancy.

Wahid collaborated with Amjad Ibrahim for his romantic horror film Dhonkamana (2003) which depicts the romantic relationship between a young man (played by Yoosuf Shafeeu) and an old woman (played by Fauziyya Hassan). Featuring Hassan, Yoosuf Shafeeu, Sheela Najeeb, Niuma Mohamed, Sheereen Abdul Wahid, Amira Ismail and Aminath Rasheedha, the film received mainly negative reviews from critics though its inclusion of the theme portraying the relationship between a couple with a large age group was appraised. She next worked with Easa Shareef for another horror film Ginihila (2003) alongside Niuma Mohamed, Ali Seezan, Mariyam Nisha and Reeko Moosa Manik, playing the role of Zeybaa, a college girl who gets attacked by an evil spirit. The film narrates the story of a young couple who decided to spend a romantic break to save their crumbling marriage and how events take a sinister turn when the wife experiences supernatural incidence which has her husband involvement in it. The film is an unofficial remake of Vikram Bhatt's Indian horror film Raaz (2002) featuring Bipasha Basu, Dino Morea, Malini Sharma and Ashutosh Rana which itself is an unofficial adaptation of What Lies Beneath.

This was followed by Abdul Faththaah-directed Aan... Aharenves Loabivin (2002) starred alongside Ali Seezan, Sheela Najeeb, Niuma Mohamed, Aminath Rasheedha and Neena Saleem where she played the role of a woman suffering from domestic abuse. Upon release, the film opened to positive response from critics and was a commercially successful project. She was applauded for her performance as a nurse and the caretaker of a disable man, in the Abdul Faththaah-directed critically acclaimed television series, Thiyey Mihithuge Vindhakee (2003) which was considered as one of the best series production in television industry. Wahid next starred as a female jinn in Amjad Ibrahim's next directorial venture Sandhuravirey 2 (2004); a sequel to his 2002 horror film Sandhuravirey which presented Yoosuf Shafeeu and Mariyam Nisha in lead roles. Starring additional cast including Niuma Mohamed, Zeenath Abbas and Mohamed Shavin, the film follows a storyline of a daughter jinn avenging the death of its mother and sister on Dhiyash's family. Similar to its prequel, the film received negative response from critics.

Yoosuf Shafeeu directed horror film Edhathuru was released in 2004 which appears Mohamed Shavin, Wahid, Ali Ahmed, Lufshan Shakeeb, Fathmath Neelam, Nadhiya Hassan, Ibrahim Sobah and Yoosuf Solih as eight friends who go on a picnic to a haunted uninhabited island and their battle for survival. The film garnered critical appreciation specially for its sound effect and was a commercial success. The same year, she starred alongside Niuma Mohamed and Ali Seezan in Ahmed Nimal's horror film Handhu Keytha (2005) which unfolds the story of a man who was enchanted by a spirit while witnessing a lunar eclipse. In the film, she played the spirit Azza, who ruins the life of a couple when her love-interest rebuked her demands.

In 2011, Rishmy first appeared in Aishath Ali Manik's romantic horror film Kuhveriakee Kaakuhey? (2011) opposite Aishath Rishmy and Ahmed Azmeel. Inspired by the horror romantic thriller Bollywood film Darling (2007), pre-production of the film was started in 2007 and shot in Sri Lanka. It revolves around a man who cheats on his wife with his secretary, and how his life slides to a haunting shift when he accidentally kills his mistress. The film and her performance received negative reviews from critics. "After so long, Sheereen is seen onscreen, but the character does not give her any opportunity to show her capability". The film did little business at boxoffice and was declared a flop.

== Filmography ==
=== Feature film ===
Year	Title	Role	Notes	Ref(s)
2001	Hithi Nimun	Raniya		
2002	Aan... Aharenves Loabivin	Aminath		
2003	Dhonkamana	Zoona		
2003	Ginihila	Zeybaa		
2003	Edhi Edhi Hoadheemey	Naaz		
2004	Dharinnahtakai	Sabeeha		
2004	Sandhuravirey 2	Baadhu		
2004	Edhathuru	Husna		
2005	Handhu Keytha	Azza		
2011	Kuhveriakee Kaakuhey?	—N/a		

=== Television ===
Year	Title	Role	Notes	Ref(s)
2002	Fahu Fiyavalhu	Mizna Mohamed	Main role; 5 episodes	
2003	Dheewanaa Hiyy	Maiha	Main role; 5 episodes	
2003–2005	Thiyey Mihithuge Vindhakee	Shimla	Recurring role; 13 episodes	
2004	Kamana Vareh Neiy	Herself	Guest role; "Episode 2"	
2004	Vaisoori	Leesha	In the segment "An'dhiri Hayaaiy"	
2004	Vahum	Sheereen	Television film	
2004–2005	Loabi Nulibunas	Usha	Main role; 15 episodes	
2005	Loabi Vaanama	Rameeza	Recurring role; 13 episodes	
2005	Fukkashi	Various roles	Main role; 3 episodes	

=== Short film ===
Year	Title	Role	Notes	Ref(s)
2004	Falhi Sikunthu 1	Mariyam		

== Accolades ==
Year	Award	Category	Nominated work	Result	Ref(s)
2007	4th Gaumee Film Awards	Best Supporting Actress	Dharinnahtakai	Nominated	
