= Effect of the 2004 Indian Ocean earthquake on the Maldives =

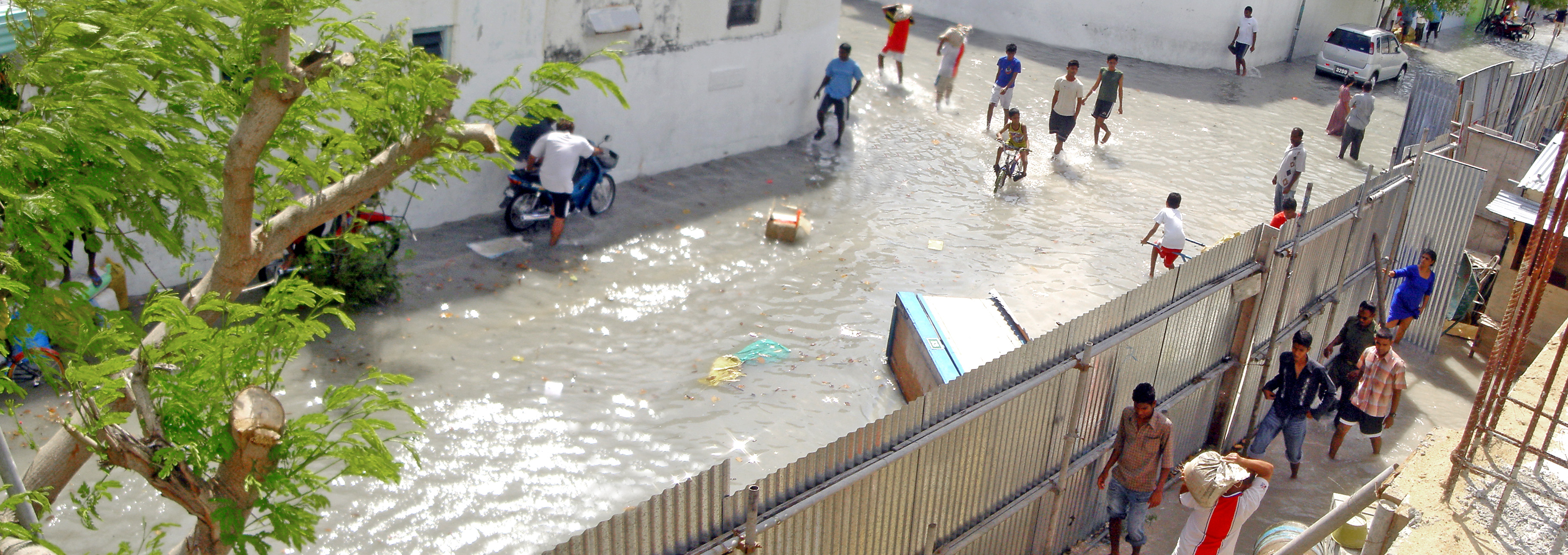
People, in Malé, borrowing sand bags from a nearby construction site, to be used as a barrier to protect their homes from the flood, shortly after being hit by the tsunami generated by the 2004 Indian Ocean earthquake.

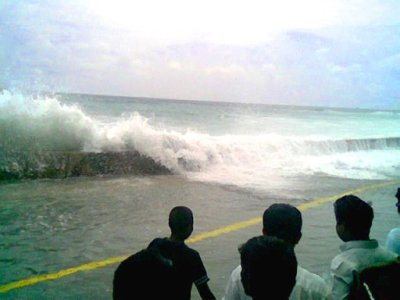
Malé, the capital island of the Maldives was severely hit by the tsunami.

In the independent republic of Maldives, all islands except for 9 were hit by the 2004 Indian Ocean tsunami. 82 people were killed and 24 were reported missing, and are now presumed dead after the archipelago was hit by a tsunami caused by the 2004 Indian Ocean earthquake on 26 December 2004. Two-thirds of the capital city Malé was flooded during the first hours of the day. Other outlying low-level atolls were badly affected, and some low-lying islands, including some of the major resorts, were submerged at the peak of the tsunami.

The government declared a state of national disaster and a special task force was set up to provide aid and supplies. Rescue efforts were hampered by loss of communication capability with the over one thousand islands that compose the nation, as well as by the lack of disaster planning.

The total damage is estimated to be nearly $460 million, which accounted for nearly 62% of the country's GDP in 2004. The reconstruction effort of all property that was damaged was estimated to be around $1 billion.
