= List of Maldivian films before 1992 =

This is a list of films produced by Maldivian film industry before 1992.

== 1980s ==
Year	Title	Director	Cast
1980	Gellunu Furaavaru		Roanu Hassan Manik
1981	Thin Fiyavalhu	Mohamed Musthafa Hussain	Hassan Afeef
1982	Orchid – Eynaage Maa	Hussain Shihab	Mohamed Rasheed, Nahidha Ali, Aminath Waheedha
1982	Ghaazee Bandaarain	Hussain Shihab; Kashima Ahmed Shakir	Adam Zahir, Ibrahim Moosa, Ahmed Shakir, Abdul Rasheed Hassan, Zuhaira Umar, Chilhiya Moosa Manik
1983	Funzakham	Hussain Shihab	Mohamed Haleem, Hawwa Hussain, Hussain Haidhar, Chilhiya Moosa Manik, Mohamed Latheef, Saudhulla, Aasiyath Waheed, Saadhuna
1984	Majubooru	Mohamed Rasheed	Ahmed Sharmeel, Najma, Mohamed Asif, Faheema, Chilhiya Moosa Manik, Mohamed Irushad, Ahmed Zahir, Fareeda, Ahmed Fikuree, Abdullah Ali
1987	Ithubaaru	Hussain Shihab; Hassan Najumee	Mohamed Rasheed, Mariyam Rasheedha, Ahmed Sharmeel, Haajara Abdul Kareem, Khadheeja Ahmed
1987	Maqsadh	Hussain Rameez	Ahmed Nimal, Fathimath Rameeza, Kaneeru Abdul Raheem, Maya, Waheedh, Chilhiya Moosa Manik
1988	Ley Karuna	Hassan Najumee	Mohamed Rasheed, Mariyam Rasheedha, Ahmed Sharumeel, Haajara Abdul Kareem, Hamid Wajeeh
1988	Shakku	Ahmed Nimal	Ahmed Nimal, Fathimath Rameeza, Asad Shareef
1989	Nufolhey Maa	Mohamed Musthafa Hussain	Hassan Afeef, Asima, Ibrahim Rasheed

== 1990s ==
Year	Title	Director	Studio	Cast
1990	Karunaige Agu	Easa Shareef	Easa Films	Asad Shareef, Fathimath Rahma, Fathimath Nizar, Easa Shareef
1990	Loabi '90	Easa Shareef	D.H. Studio	Asad Shareef, Mariyam Rasheedha, Khadheeja Adam, Fathimath Nizar, Easa Shareef
1991	Loabeege Thoofan	Ibrahim Rasheed	Farivaa Films	Reeko Moosa Manik, Athifa, Waleedha Waleed, Fathimath Didi, Ibrahim Rasheed
