= Karuna =

Karuna may refer to:

- Karuṇā, part of the spiritual path in Hinduism, Buddhism and Jainism
- Karunas, Indian actor and politician
- Karuna Kodithuwakku (born 1961), Sri Lankan politician
- Karuna Nundy, Indian lawyer
- Vinayagamoorthy Muralitharan (born 1966), also known as Colonel Karuna
- Karuna, Finland, former municipality in Finland
- Karuna, Bangladesh
- Karuna (album), an album by Nawang Khechog
- Karuna (1966 film), a Malayalam language film
- Karuna (1994 film), a Maldivian film
