= Aishath Gulfa =

Maldivian film actress

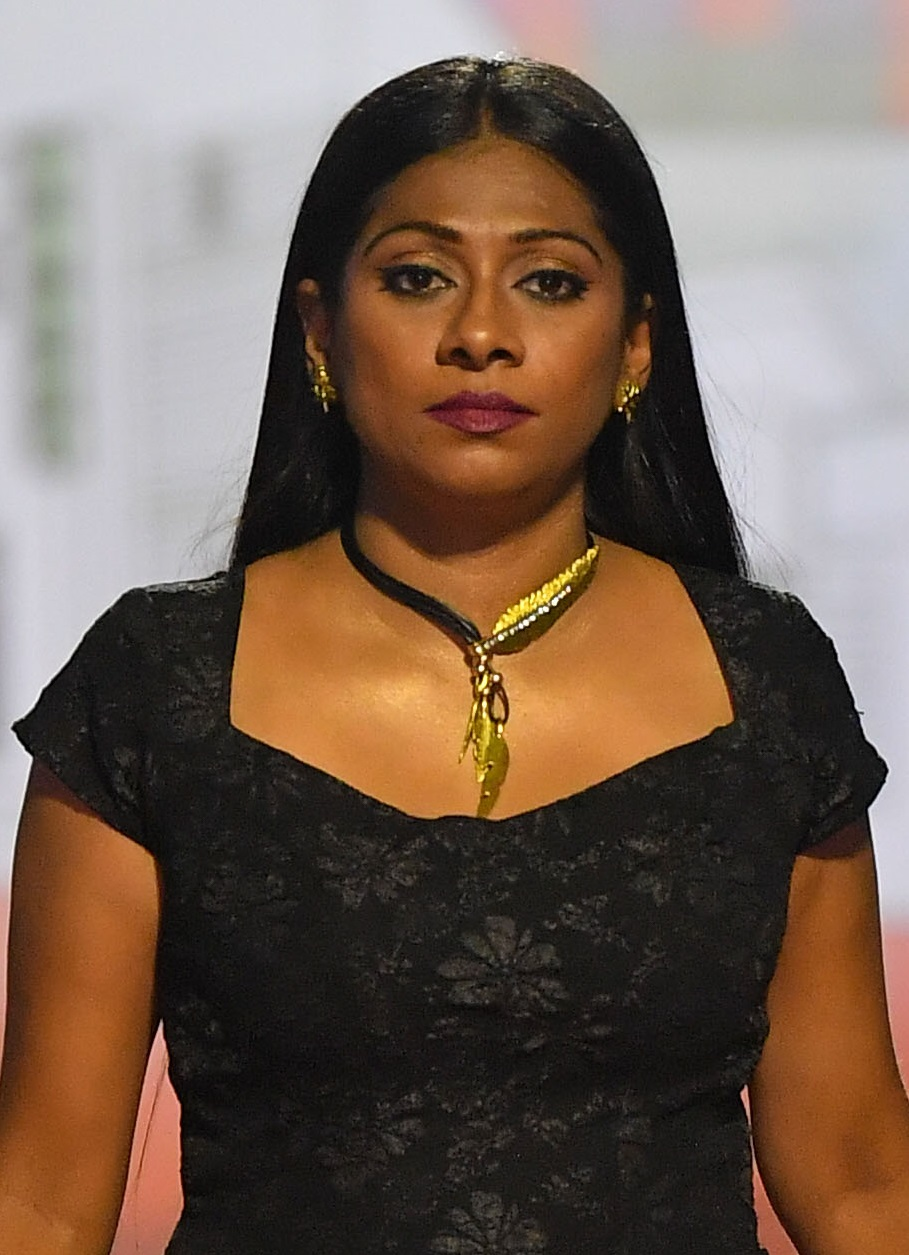
- Gulfa at Olympus reopening ceremony, 2023
- Born: 17 March 1982 (age 44); Male', Maldives
- Occupation: Actress
- Years active: 1999–present

Aishath Gulfa (born 17 March 1982) is a Maldivian film actress. She made her screen debut in 1999 with the video single "Nala Nala Dhanvaru Feni". Afterwards, she played supporting roles in several films including Kaiveneege Furathama Rey (1999), Ajaaib (2000), Hiiy Edhenee (2001) and Ginihila (2003). After taking a break from acting, Gulfa re-appeared in films with Dark Rain Entertainment's Emme Fahu Vindha Jehendhen (2015) as Dr. Aisha, a role she reprise in two other films, Vaashey Mashaa Ekee (2016), Mee Loaybakee (2017).

== Career ==
In 1999, Gulfa made her screen debut by accepting an offer from Asim Thaufeeq, in a video single titled "Nala Nala Dhanvaru Feni" alongside Ismail Wajeeh. She next appeared as a rebellious daughter in Kaiveneege Furathama Rey which aware the audience on how to tackle sexual assault and rape. The following year, she starred opposite Ahmed Asim, Mariyam Nazima, Koyya Hassan Manik and Waleedha Waleed in Haajara Abdul Kareem-directed Ajaaib which depicts the relationship of two exemplary wives and their respective families regardless of societal norms. She then worked with Aishath Ali Manik for Hiiy Edhenee (2001) which was an unofficial remake of Dharmesh Darshan's romantic film Dhadkan (2000) where she reprised the role played by Manjeet Kullar in the original, the wicked step-sister.

In 2003, Gulfa collaborated with Easa Shareef for the horror film Ginihila, alongside Ali Seezan, Niuma Mohamed, Mariyam Nisha and Reeko Moosa Manik, playing the role of a supportive friend. The film narrates the story of a young couple who decided to spend a romantic break to save their crumbling marriage and how events take a sinister turn when the wife experiences supernatural incidence which has her husband involvement in it. The film is an unofficial remake of Vikram Bhatt's Indian horror film Raaz (2002) which itself is an unofficial adaptation of What Lies Beneath.

After taking a break from the screen, Gulfa returned in 2015, where she appeared in Ali Shifau-directed romantic film Emme Fahu Vindha Jehendhen as a doctor, alongside Mohamed Jumayyil and Mariyam Majudha. The film narrating the struggle and challenges a happily married couple undergo, was the highest grossing Maldivian film of the year, and was a critical success. She played the same role in another Dark Rain Entertainment's production, Ali Shifau-directed romantic comedy Vaashey Mashaa Ekee (2016) opposite Mohamed Jumayyil and Mariyam Majudha narrating the life of a happily married couple being separated due to the husband's crippling fear of commitment on his wife's pregnancy.

In 2017, she reprises the same role in another Dark Rain Entertainment's productions, Ali Shifau-directed romantic comedy Mee Loaybakee alongside Mohamed Jumayyil and Mariyam Azza. The film which is considered to include the largest cast in a Maldivian feature film, narrates the story of two ex-lovers sliding into the friend zone with the envy and diffidence they experience amidst a convoluted love-triangle. The film and her performance received mainly positive reviews from critics . The film emerged as one of the highest grossing Maldivian films of 2017.

== Filmography ==
=== Feature film ===
Year	Title	Role	Notes	Ref(s)
2000	Kaiveneege Furathama Rey	Madheeha		
2000	Ajaaib	Mariyam		
2001	Dhumah Eri Thari	Herself	Special appearance	
2001	Hiiy Edhenee	Suzy		
2003	Ginihila	Suweydha		
2010	Mi Hiyy Keekkuraanee?	Latheefa	Special appearance	
2015	Emme Fahu Vindha Jehendhen	Dr. Aisha	Special appearance	
2016	Vaashey Mashaa Ekee	Dr. Aisha		
2017	Mee Loaybakee	Dr. Aisha		
2023	Beeveema	Ainth		
2024	Dheydharu Ruin	Mother		
2025	Loabin...?	Zoona		

=== Television ===
Year	Title	Role	Notes	Ref(s)
2000	Reysham	Herself	Guest role; "Episode 9"	
2003	Hiyy Edhey Raasthaa			
2007	Wafaatheri Nuvevunas			
2021	Rumi á Jannat	Shabana	Guest role; Episode: "Family Matters"	
2023–2024	Yaaraa	Gulfa	Recurring role; 7 episodes	
2025	Moosun	Zahidha	Recurring role; 4 episodes	
