= Loabi Veveynee Furaana Dheegen =

- Official film poster
- Directed by: Yoosuf Rafeeu
- Produced by: Bukhari Films
- Starring: Yoosuf Rafeeu; Mariyam Shakeela; Haajara Abdul Kareem
- Cinematography: Mohamed Rasheed
- Edited by: Yoosuf Rafeeu
- Production company: Bukhari Films
- Release date: 1992
- Country: Maldives
- Language: Dhivehi

Loabi Veveynee Furaana Dheegen is a 1992 Maldivian drama film directed by Yoosuf Rafeeu. Produced by Bukhari Films, the film stars Rafeeu, Mariyam Shakeela and Haajara Abdul Kareem in pivotal roles.

== Premise ==
Aadhanu (Yoosuf Rafeeu) a hardworking unappealing man does everything in his capability to please a young woman and a student, Mariyam (Mariyam Shakeela). Mariyam avoids Aadhanu noting his displeasing features though her mother, Dhon Kamana (Haajara Abdul Kareem) is slightly gratified with his service. A romantic relationship grows between Mariyam and her teacher.

== Cast ==
- Yoosuf Rafeeu as Aadhanu
- Mariyam Shakeela as Mariyam
- Haajara Abdul Kareem as Dhon Kamana
- Hussain Athif
- Sithi Fulhu as Sithi
- Ibrahim Fulhu
- Mohamed Athif
- Ali Mohamed Zaidhee
- Ibrahim Shakir

== Soundtrack ==
Track listing
No.	Title	Lyrics	Singer(s)	Length
1.	"Dheynutho Ey Kalaa"		Umar Zahir
2.	"Raahath Mirey Kuruvaifiye"		Hussain Rasheedh, Shifa Thaufeeq
3.	"Gadharu Dheefaa Viyas Hithugaa"	Kaneeru Abdul Raheem	Sofa Thaufeeq
4.	"Furaana Dheegenney Saafu Loabi Veveynee"		Mas'odi Ibrahimfulhu
