= Loabin Hiyy Furenee =

2008 Maldivian television series

- Written by: Shifa
- Directed by: Ahmed Ziya
- Music by: Hassan Aiman
- Country of origin: Maldives
- Original language: Dhivehi
- No. of seasons: 1
- No. of episodes: 13

Production
- Producer: Aisha Shadhin Shamail
- Cinematography: Adam Nisham; Aswad; Ali Mueen; Hassan Haleem
- Editor: Ahmed Ziya
- Running time: 23–25 minutes
- Production company: Moviepeople

Original release
- Release: 2008

Loabin Hiyy Furenee is a 2008 Maldivian television series directed by Ahmed Ziya. Produced by Aisha Shadhin Shamail under Moviepeople, the series stars Ahmed Asim, Khadheeja Ibrahim Didi and Zeenath Abbas in pivotal roles.

== Cast ==
=== Main ===
- Ahmed Asim as Ahmed Iyaz
- Khadheeja Ibrahim Didi as Maiha
- Zeenath Abbas as Zeyna
- Ahmed Ziya as Naafil
- Fathimath Azifa as Nathasha

=== Recurring ===
- Mohamed Waheed as Qadhir Easa
- Fauziyya Hassan as Zeyna's mother
- Abdulla Munaz as Ibrahim Majudhee

=== Guest ===
- Yooshau Jameel as Iyaz's brother (Episode 12)

== Episodes ==
No. in season	Title	Directed by
1	"Episode 1"	Ahmed Ziya
Iyaz (Ahmed Asim), an orphan who lost his parents at the age of fourteen, relocates to Malé with the help of Qadir who helps him securing a job at a company owned by Majudhee (Abdulla Munaz). The step-daughter of Qadir, Zeyna (Zeenath Abbas) who mistreats her own mother (Fauziyya Hassan) for her disability, tries to seduce Iyaz.
2	"Episode 2"	Ahmed Ziya
A colleague of Iyaz and Zeyna's mother warn him about Majudhee and Qadhir. Iyaz starts getting closer to Zeyna. An inappropriate behavior of Zeyna leads to a conflict in their relationship.
3	"Episode 3"	Ahmed Ziya
They later reconcile and Iyaz decides to conceal the truth of their relationship from her parents. Iyaz's ex-girlfriend, Maiha (Khadheeja Ibrahim Didi) re-appears in his life much to his discomfort.
4	"Episode 4"	Ahmed Ziya
Maiha tries to win his heart back but fails in every possible attempt. Complications arise when Iyaz realizes that both Maiha and Zeyna are close friends. Iyaz warns Maiha not to say a word about their relationship to Zeyna.
5	"Episode 5"	Ahmed Ziya
Majudhee assigns Iyaz to complete an assignment. Soon after, Majudhee suspects someone is conspiring against them. Meanwhile, Zeyna brings Maiha to her house as an act of sympathy due to her current living condition. Maiha makes it her life mission to separate Iyaz and Zeyna.
6	"Episode 6"	Ahmed Ziya
Iyaz questions his safety when Qadhir is arrested by the police due to a black money scam. Zeyna figures out that Iyaz and Maiha were previously involved in a romantic relationship. Zeyna confronts Maiha about her relationship with Iyaz to which she explained that Iyaz is her husband who deceived her for family wealth.
7	"Episode 7"	Ahmed Ziya
Maiha exposes Iyaz which resulted in Zeyna breaking up with him. Furious, he divorces Maiha. Iyaz confesses in the black money scam to which he is jailed for six years.
8	"Episode 8"	Ahmed Ziya
Years later, Iyaz is now married to an indolent and abusive wife, Aminath Nathasha (Fathimath Azifa), while Zeyna is married to an irresponsible and carefree man, Naafil (Ahmed Ziya). Naafil meets Nathasha and falls in love with her.
9	"Episode 9"	Ahmed Ziya
Nafil and Nathasha continue their secret affair.
10	"Episode 10"	Ahmed Ziya
To take care of his sick mother, Nafil moves to his island with Zeyna. Nathasha takes a break from work and decide to join him in the island while promising him not to believe any rumors she hears.
11	"Episode 11"	Ahmed Ziya
12	"Episode 12"	Ahmed Ziya
Iyaz seeks forgiveness from Zeyna and they both reunite. Iyaz narrates his life after the imprisonment and the circumstances which forced him to marry Nathasha and how it led to his miserable life.
13	"Episode 13"	Ahmed Ziya
Zeyna exposes Nafil and Nathasha's affair to Iyaz which leads him to divorce her and get back with Zeyna.

== Soundtrack ==
Track listing
No.	Title	Singer(s)	Length
1.	"Loabin Hiyy Furenee"	Jawid
