= Kaiveneege Furathama Rey =

2000 Maldivian film by Hussain Rasheed

- Official film poster
- Directed by: Mohamed Abdul Hakeem; Mohamed Nasheed
- Written by: Mohamed Nasheed
- Screenplay by: Mohamed Nasheed
- Produced by: Hussain Rasheed
- Starring: Sajna Ahmed; Mohamed Abdul Hakeem; Ahmed Asim
- Cinematography: Mohamed Nasheed; Ali Rasheed; Mohamed
- Edited by: Mohamed Abdul Hakeem
- Production company: Farivaa Films
- Release date: 2000
- Running time: 55 minutes
- Country: Maldives
- Language: Dhivehi

Kaiveneege Furathama Rey is a 2000 Maldivian drama film co-directed by Mohamed Abdul Hakeem and Mohamed Nasheed. Produced by Hussain Rasheed under Farivaa Films, the film stars Sajna Ahmed, Mohamed Abdul Hakeem and Ahmed Asim in pivotal roles.

== Premise ==
Sameer (Ahmed Asim), the only son of a wealthy businessman, Shamlatheef (Mohamed Abdul Hakeem) rapes their maid, Haajara's (Haajara Abdul Kareem) adopted daughter, Sajna (Sajna Ahmed). Haajara files a defamation case against their family who in return offers a two lack cheque requesting to withdraw their case. Enraged, Haajara and Sajna moves ahead with their complaint while appointing Shamlatheef's son-in-law, Ahmed (Mohamed Saeed) as their lawyer. The family settles the case outside the court and Sameer agrees to marry Sajna since it is his only option to drop the case filed against him by default.

== Cast ==
- Sajna Ahmed as Sajna
- Mohamed Abdul Hakeem as Shamlatheef
- Ahmed Asim as Sameer
- Haajara Abdul Kareem as Haajara
- Chilhiya Moosa Manik as Doctor
- Sarumeela Fauzy as Latheefa
- Mohamed Saeed as Saeed
- Aishath Haleem as Sameer's girlfriend
- Ahmed Ibrahim as Ahmed
- Aishath Gulfa as Madheeha
- Ahmed Sidhuqee as Abdul Muhusin
- Ahmed Azmeel as a police officer (Special appearance)

== See also ==
- Lists of Maldivian films
