= Ahmed Ziya =

Maldivian actor, editor and director

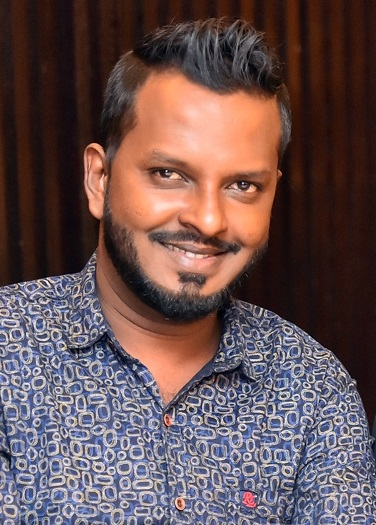
- Ziya at Niuma Mohamed's Silver Jubilee celebration event, 2019
- Born: 4 February 1981 (age 45); Maldives
- Occupations: Actor, editor, director
- Years active: 2001–present

Ahmed Ziya (born 4 February 1981) is a Maldivian film actor, editor and director.

== Career ==
In 2002, Ziya played the love interest of an ill-treated outsider in Abdul Faththaah's Fahu Fiyavalhu. Afterwards, he played small roles in other television series including Faththaah's Thiyey Mihithuge Vindhakee and Amjad Ibrahim's Kamana Vareh Neiy. In 2004, he appeared in Mohamed Abdulla's comedy short films series Dheke Dhekeves in two of its installments, followed by Yoosuf Shafeeu's horror children's short film series Vasvaas by playing the role of Sheikhul Hayya, a saint man. From 2007 to 2010, he mainly starred in short films in which several of them were directed by himself including Dhalhamathi, Nukandaa 2, The Boat, Keevvehey Vakivee Yaaraa? and Maafkuraashey Kalaa.

In 2011, he played a brief role in the Moomin Fuad-directed crime tragedy drama Loodhifa, which features an ensemble cast and deals with current social issues in the society told from different perspectives of the characters. Made on a budget of MVR 600,000, the film was declared a commercial failure though it received wide critical acclaim, praising the performance of cast and the film's "realism" in its language, characters and their attitude. His next release was Ali Seezan's war action comedy film Wathan. Upon release the film received negative response from critics, where Haveeru Daily felt the film "deceived" the audience in the name of action thriller; "I highly doubt if the project team was even sure of what kind of movie they were planning to make. It is a total mess between a serious action movie and scoop comedy". The film was further criticed for remaking several shots from Jim Abrahams's parody film, Hot Shots! Part Deux (1993). He was next featured as a gang member in Yoosuf Shafeeu's action drama film Insaaf (2011) which revolves around the disputes between two districts of an island. Upon release, the film received mixed to positive reviews from critics. Ahmed Nadheem from Haveeru was impressed with the editing by Ziya and Shafeeu, though he notes the former's performance as "strictly average". Despite the reviews, he received a nomination for Best Supporting Actor and Best Editor at 2nd Maldives Film Awards.

In 2013, he starred in a small role in Hussain Munawwar's second direction, the revenge thriller film Dhilakani (2013) along with Ismail Rasheed, Niuma Mohamed, Mohamed Manik, Mohamed Faisal and Aminath Rishfa. The film which deals with a man's tumultuous journey to seek vengeance and the demolition of family bond over a girl attracted negative reception from critics while Nadheem wrote: "Embraced with futile characters, impractical scenes and outdated music, the film problematic in each department".

== Personal life ==
Ziya married Sidhatha Shareef, former Minister of Gender, Family and Social Services, on 21 February 2021. Ziya had two previous wives and has a child to one of them.

== Filmography ==
=== Feature film ===
Year	Title	Role	Notes	Ref(s)
2001	Aaah	Junaid's friend	Special appearance	
2010	Dhin Veynuge Hithaamaigaa	Fairooz's agent	Special appearance	
2011	Loodhifa	Jinatte		
2011	Wathan	Ziya		
2011	Insaaf	Naabe	Also the editor Nominated—Maldives Film Award for Best Supporting Actor	
2013	Dhilakani	Raalhey		
2019	Nivairoalhi	Doctor		

=== Television ===
Year	Title	Role	Notes	Ref(s)
2002	Fahu Fiyavalhu	Firaq	Recurring role; 5 episodes	
2003	Thiyey Mihithuge Vindhakee	Afzal	Guest role	
2004	Kamana Vareh Neiy	Journalist	Guest role; "Episode 2"	
2006	Nethi Dhiyayas	Customer	Guest role; "Episode 4"	
2008	FB!		Main role; 5 episodes	
2008	Kushakaanulaa Shazaa Nudheyshey		Main role	
2008	Loabin Hiyy Furenee	Naafil	Main role; 13 episodes Also the director and editor	
2012	Kaiveni	Assad	Main role; 4 episodes Also the editor	
2013	Adhives Eloaibah Gadharu Kuran	Ziyad's friend	Guest role	
2021	Avahteriya	Lucky	Main role; 9 episodes	
2021	Giridha	Rameez	Recurring role; 5 episodes	
2023	Hayyaru	Seexer	Recurring role; 15 episodes	

=== Short film ===
Year	Title	Role	Notes
2002	Foolhudhigu Handi	Hassan Thakuru	
2004	Dheke Dhekeves 1	Fareed	
2004	Falhi Sikunthu 1	Himself	Special appearance in the song "Meheboob Magey"
2005	Dheke Dhekeves 2	Fareed	
2006	Vasvaas 1	Sheikhul Hayya	
2007	Vasvaas 3	Sheikhul Hayya	
2007	Nudhaashe Dhookohfaa Loabivaa	Hussain	
2007	Dhalhamathi	Azim	Also the director
2007	Nukan'daa 2	Mushtharee	Also the editor
2007	Vasvaas 4	Sheikhul Hayya	
2007	Paneeno	King Dinamo	
2007	Barbafar		
2008	The Boat	Siraj's friend	Also co-director
2008	Kurafi Dhaadha	Sheikhul Hayya	
2009	Lhakoe	Himself	Special appearance
2010	Keevvehey Vakivee Yaaraa?	Anwar	Also the director
2010	Maafkuraashey Kalaa	Falah	Also the director
2010	Crime Petrol-1: Nuva Aharuge Anhen Kujjehge Nimun		
2018	Kan'du Ibilees		

=== Other work ===
Year	Title	Director	Camera	Editor	Notes
2007	Kudafoolhaai Paree Dhahtha			Yes	Short film
2007	Foolhu Dhigu Handi 2			Yes	Short film
2007	Loabeegaa Dhon U		Yes	Yes	Short film
2007	Dhalhamathi	Yes			Short film
2007	Nukan'daa 2			Yes	Short film
2008	Loabin Hiyy Furenee	Yes		Yes	Television series; 13 episodes
2008	The Boat	Yes		Yes	Short film; co-directed with Ibrahim Wisan
2008	Kurafi Dhaadha			Yes	Short film; co-edited with Ali Musthafa
2009	Baaraige Fas			Yes	Feature film
2009	Fahun Rangalhuvaane 2			Yes	Short film
2010	Keevvehey Vakivee Yaaraa?	Yes			Short film
2010	Maafkuraashey Kalaa	Yes			Short film
2011	Insaaf			Yes	Feature film; co-edited with Yoosuf Shafeeu
2012	Kaiveni			Yes	Television series; 4 episodes
2012	Dhirumeh Nethas			Yes	Television series; 5 episodes
2018	Reyvumun			Yes	Feature film

== Accolades ==
Year	Award	Category	Nominated work	Result	Ref(s)
2012	2nd Maldives Film Awards	Best Supporting Actor	Insaaf	Nominated	
2012	2nd Maldives Film Awards	Best Editing	Insaaf (Shared with Yoosuf Shafeeu)	Nominated	
