= Nafrathu =

- Official film poster
- Directed by: Abdulla Shujau
- Written by: Ali Shameel
- Screenplay by: Abdulla Shujau
- Produced by: Hussain Rasheed
- Starring: Aishath Shiranee; Nafiu Ali; Nooma Ibrahim; Ali Shameel; Arifa Ibrahim
- Cinematography: Abdulla Shujau; Ahmed Ayaz
- Music by: Mohamed Madeeh
- Production company: Farivaa Films
- Release date: November 11, 1994
- Country: Maldives
- Language: Dhivehi

Nafrathu is a 1994 Maldivian drama film directed by Abdulla Shujau. Produced by Hussain Rasheed under Farivaa Films, the film stars Aishath Shiranee, Nafiu Ali, Nooma Ibrahim, Ali Shameel and Arifa Ibrahim in pivotal roles.

== Cast ==
- Aishath Shiranee as Fazna
- Nafiu Ali as Nashidh
- Nooma Ibrahim as Shaira
- Ali Shameel as Nahidh
- Arifa Ibrahim as Aneesa; Shaira's mother
- Ibrahim Shakir as Moosafulhu; Nashidh's father
- Aminath Ibrahim Didi as Faahthaanike; Nashidh's mother
- Hamid Wajeeh
- Fathimath Shadhiya
- Adam Unais Zaki as young Nashid
- Hawwa Ennie as young Fazna
- Hassan Niyaz
- Hassan Ifham
- Mohamed Afrah

== Soundtrack ==
Track listing
| No. | Title | Lyrics | Singer(s) | Length |
|---|---|---|---|---|
| 1. | "Sirru Sirrunhey Bunanvee" | Ali Shameel | Abdul Hannan Moosa Didi, Suveydha Ibrahim |
| 2. | "Firumunthakey Bappamen" | Ali Shameel | Elisha Abdul Hannan |
| 3. | "Rankula Jehi Loabi" | Ali Shameel | Abdul Hannan Moosa Didi, Sofa Thaufeeq |
| 4. | "Goanaa Kohlaa" | Ali Shameel | Abdul Hannan Moosa Didi, Sofa Thaufeeq |
| 5. | "Libemun Midhaa Aniyaa" | Ali Shameel | Abdul Hannan Moosa Didi |
| 6. | "Aiyngehge Vaajibakah" | Ali Shameel | Sofa Thaufeeq |

== See also ==
- Lists of Maldivian films
