= Lheedharifulhu =

1996 Maldivian film

- Official film poster
- Directed by: Ahmed Sharumeel
- Written by: Ahmed Sharumeel
- Screenplay by: Ahmed Sharumeel; Hussain Adhil
- Produced by: Makhma Hussain Rasheed
- Starring: Abdul Rahman Rauf; Zaneena; Ahmed Sharumeel; Mariyam Haajara; Haajara Abdul Kareem
- Cinematography: Hussain Adhil
- Edited by: Hussain Adhil
- Music by: Hussain Adhil
- Production company: Farivaa Films
- Release date: May 13, 1996
- Country: Maldives
- Language: Dhivehi

Lheedharifulhu is a 1996 Maldivian film written and directed by Ahmed Sharumeel. Produced by Makhma Hussain Rasheed under Farivaa Films, the film stars Abdul Rahman Rauf, Zaneena, Ahmed Sharumeel, Mariyam Haajara and Haajara Abdul Kareem in pivotal roles. It narrates the downturn of a woman followed by hatred for her daughter-in-law.

== Premise ==
After completing his studies, Sameer returns to his homeland as the headmaster of the school. Sameer's mother, Dhon Didi arranges his marriage with his childhood friend, Shehenaz, who is born and raised in a wealthy family. Dhon Didi's plans backfire when Sameer begins a romantic relationship with an underprivileged woman, Fathimath Sameeha. Dejected, she declares war against the married couple and determines to make Sameeha's life miserable at any cost. Dhon Didi conspires to prove Sameeha's infidelity, all of which ultimately works in favor of the couple.

However, as the couple manages to survive the worst days of their lives, Sameer falls from a high tree and becomes handicapped which leads him to resign from his post. Sameeha, now pregnant, added with their financial instabilities, is thrown from the house when Sameer dies from further injuries to his previous wound. Shehenaz marries Sameer's younger brother, Nawaz, to avenge Sameeha for snatching her first love, Sameer. The news of Shehenaz and Nawaz's marriage was anticipated to bring fortune to Dhon Didi. However, things did not work out as her plans, when the indolent daughter-in-law treats Dhon Didi as a servant in the house.

== Cast ==
- Abdul Rahman Rauf as Nawaz
- Zaneena as Shehenaz
- Ahmed Sharumeel as Ahmed Sameer
- Mariyam Haajara as Fathimath Sameeha
- Haajara Abdul Kareem as Dhondhee
- Abdul Rasheed
- Mohamed Naeem
- Waheedha
- Mariyam Ali
- Moosa Rushdhee
- Ahmed Ibrahim
- Thuhthu Maniku
- Hassan Didi

== Soundtrack ==
Track listing
No.	Title	Lyrics	Singer(s)	Length
1.	"Reyrey Kuri Dhauru Neyngeythee"	Ahmed Riza (Tharaboozu)	Shifa Thaufeeq	03:15
2.	"Dhen Othee Hoadhumey"	Easa Shareef	Mohamed Rashad, Shifa Thaufeeq
3.	"Loabi Dheyneyey Araam"	Kaneeru Abdul Raheem	Ali Rameez, Shifa Thaufeeq	02:59
4.	"Uff Kalaa Han'dhaanvumun"	Ahmed Sharumeel	Shifa Thaufeeq	03:53
5.	"Inthiha Yaaru Libun"	Easa Shareef	Abdulla Waheedh (Feeali)	04:43
6.	"Madun Mi Ove Nidhaalaathoa"	Jameela Saleem	Jameela Saleem

== Response ==
Upon release, the film received mainly positive reviews from critics where the performance of Haajara Abdul Kareem was particularly noted for her realistic presentation of an "aggressive and insistent" mother-in-law.
