= Ajaaib =

- Official film poster
- Directed by: Haajara Abdul Kareem
- Written by: Haajara Abdul Kareem
- Screenplay by: Haajara Abdul Kareem
- Produced by: Hussain Rasheed
- Starring: Ahmed Asim; Mariyam Nazima; Koyya Hassan Manik; Waleedha Waleed
- Cinematography: Fathuhee
- Edited by: Mohamed Abdul Hakeem
- Music by: Mohamed Abdul Hakeem
- Production company: Farivaa Films
- Release date: April 10, 2000
- Country: Maldives
- Language: Dhivehi

Ajaaib is a 2000 Maldivian drama film written and directed by Haajara Abdul Kareem. Produced by Hussain Rasheed under Farivaa Films, the film stars Ahmed Asim, Mariyam Nazima, Koyya Hassan Manik and Waleedha Waleed in pivotal roles. It was released on 10 April 2000.

== Plotline ==
Aadhanu (Koyya Hassan Manik), happily married to Mareena (Sakeena Dhon Ali) and living with their two children, decides to relocate himself to Male' in order to acquire some funds needed to renovate his house. Rasheedha (Waleedha Waleed), a divorcee who is looking after her aged mother, Aisa Manike (Haajara Abdul Kareem) allows him to stay at her house as a tenant. Aadhanu and Rasheedha marries on Mareena's approval though Mareena's mother (Haajara Abdul Kareem) tried to talk her out of it.

== Cast ==
- Ahmed Asim as Ahmed
- Mariyam Nazima as Sama
- Koyya Hassan Manik as Aadhanu
- Chilhiya Moosa Manik as Iburey
- Waleedha Waleed as Rasheedha
- Sakeena Dhon Ali as Mareena
- Haajara Abdul Kareem as Aisa Manike / Mareena's mother
- Aiminaidhee as Waheedha
- Mohamed Abdulla
- Sithi Fulhu as Dhaleyka
- Aishath Gulfa as Mariyam
- Mohamed Rasheed
- Ali Manik
- Abdulla Naseer

== Soundtrack ==
Track listing
No.	Title	Lyrics	Singer(s)	Length
1.	"Nidhifa Ovefaathoa"	Sofa Thaufeeq	Sofa Thaufeeq
2.	"Moosun Mee Edhey Chaalu"	Sofa Thaufeeq	Sofa Thaufeeq, Abdul Hannan Moosa Didi
3.	"Veyn Libeyneehey?"	Ahmed Sharumeel	Asim Thaufeeq, Sofa Thaufeeq
4.	"Govaalee Ruheythoa"	Sofa Thaufeeq	Sofa Thaufeeq
5.	"Aan Ekey Buneema Heeviye Aalam"	Majeedh	Asim Thaufeeq
