= Insaaf (2011 film) =

- Official film poster
- Directed by: Yoosuf Shafeeu
- Written by: Yoosuf Shafeeu
- Screenplay by: Yoosuf Shafeeu
- Produced by: Ismail Shafeeq
- Starring: Yoosuf Shafeeu; Ahmed Saeed; Ahmed Ziya; Ibrahim Jihad; Mohamed Manik
- Cinematography: Ibrahim Wisan; Hassan Haleem
- Edited by: Ahmed Ziya; Yoosuf Shafeeu
- Music by: Mohamed Ikram
- Release date: 29 November 2011
- Country: Maldives
- Language: Dhivehi

Insaaf (transl. Justice) is a 2011 Maldivian action drama film directed by Yoosuf Shafeeu. Produced by Ismail Shafeeq under Eupe Productions, the film stars Ahmed Saeed, Yoosuf Shafeeu, Ahmed Ziya, Ibrahim Jihad and Mohamed Manik in pivotal roles. The film was released on 29 November 2011. The film revolves around the disputes between two districts of an island.

== Cast ==
- Yoosuf Shafeeu as Aiman
- Mohamed Manik as Mac
- Ahmed Saeed as Zareer
- Ibrahim Jihad as Shavin
- Ahmed Ziya as Naabe
- Ajunaz Ali as Affaal
- Abdulla Naseer as Bodube
- Mariyam Shahuza as Sausan
- Inad Thaufeeq as SP Police
- Aminath Ziyadha as Nuzu
- Mohamed Rifshan as Ammadey
- Ahmed Rifau as Battey
- Umar Ashfaq as Manik

== Soundtrack ==
Track listing
No.	Title	Lyrics	Music	Singer(s)	Length
1.	"Ranyaa"	Mohamed Abdul Ghanee	Inad Thaufeeq	Mohamed Abdul Ghanee, Rafiyath Rameeza
2.	"Insaaf" (Promotional song)	Inad Thaufeeq	Inad Thaufeeq	Black & White Fet Popatey

== Release and response ==
Insaaf was initially slated for release on 22 November 2011, but pushed for a 29 November 2011 release on public demand, since a majority of the audience were on vacation during holidays. Upon release, the film received mixed to positive reviews from critics. Ahmed Nadheem from Haveeru praised the performance of Mohamed Manik and Ahmed Saeed while criticizing the work of Yoosuf Shafeeu: "It is evident Shafeeu has put so much effort into developing the characters of the film, but he forgot to develop his own character". Summing up his review, Nadheem labelled as a "different" film and warned audience about extra use of "shaky-camera" which might cause dizziness.

== Accolades ==
Award	Category	Recipients	Result	Ref.
2nd Maldives Film Awards	Best Film	Insaaf	Nominated	
2nd Maldives Film Awards	Best Director	Yoosuf Shafeeu	Nominated	
2nd Maldives Film Awards	Best Actor	Ahmed Saeed	Nominated	
2nd Maldives Film Awards	Best Supporting Actor	Ahmed Ziya	Nominated	
2nd Maldives Film Awards	Best Supporting Actor	Yoosuf Shafeeu	Nominated	
2nd Maldives Film Awards	Best Editing	Ahmed Ziya, Yoosuf Shafeeu	Nominated	
2nd Maldives Film Awards	Best Sound Mixing	Mohamed Ikram	Won	
2nd Maldives Film Awards	Best Sound Editing	Mohamed Ikram	Won	
2nd Maldives Film Awards	Best Original Score	Mohamed Ikram	Won	
7th Gaumee Film Awards	Best Actor	Ahmed Saeed	Nominated	
7th Gaumee Film Awards	Best Costume Design	Ahmed Saeed, Ismail Shafeeq, Yoosuf Shafeeu	Nominated	
