= Adhives Eloaibah Gadharu Kuran =

- Genre: Romantic drama
- Written by: Fathimath Nahula
- Screenplay by: Fathimath Nahula
- Directed by: Fathimath Nahula
- Starring: Mohamed Faisal; Fathimath Fareela; Abdul Latheef
- Music by: Fathhulla Shakeel Hussain
- No. of seasons: 2
- No. of episodes: 13

Production
- Producer: Ismail Shafeeq
- Cinematography: Shivaz Abdulla
- Editor: Mohamed Faisal
- Running time: 23–27 minutes
- Production company: Crystal Entertainment

Original release
- Release: 2012 – 2013

Adhives Eloaibah Gadharu Kuran is a Maldivian romantic drama television series developed for Television Maldives by Fathimath Nahula. Produced by Ismail Shafeeq, the series stars Fathimath Fareela, Mohamed Faisal, Aminath Rishfa and Mariyam Shakeela in pivotal roles. The first season of the series was aired on Television Maldives in 2012. A second season titled, Adhives Eloaibah Gadharu Kuran: Eloabeege Handhaanugai was aired in 2013.

== Premise ==
=== Season 1 ===
Mohamed Asim (Mohamed Faisal), the only child of Aasha (Mariyam Shakeela) born from an extramarital affair, struggles to find acceptance in society due to his parents' infidelity. His father, Fahumee Riza (Mohamed Rasheed), refuses to acknowledge Asim, claiming the risk of losing his post as a judge. Asim relocates to Male' for a few months seeking a job and to raise enough money to marry his girlfriend, Fazeela (Fathimath Fareela) who is mistreated by her father (Abdulla Naseer) and step-mother (Mariyam Haleem). There he meets his lookalike, Ziyad (Mohamed Faisal) and Asim visits his father who calls him a "mistake" while disowning him. On his way back to the island, Asim meets an accident and is left unconscious for four days. Desperate to flee from her abusive step-mother, Fazeela begins an affair with Zaki (Abdul Latheef), a businessman and moves to Male' with him while agreeing to marry him. Asim shares the news of grief with his mother and she dies of a heart attack. Meanwhile, Asim auditions and is ultimately selected to perform with a reputed vocalist, Mary (Aminath Rishfa). Fazeela discovers the truth of Zaki through his wife, Mary (Fathimath Mufliha).

=== Season 2 ===
Aasha is revealed to be alive but paralyzed. Fazeela tries to reconcile with Asim while hoping to evade Zaki's obsession. Failing to get back with Asim, Fazeela moves back to her island. Ziyad bumps into Asim while trying to run away from Police and accidentally drops a small package of drugs. Asim reveals his identity to Ziyad and hands over the drugs to Fahumee. A heated argument between Ziyad and Fahumee results in the latter being admitted to hospital. In a call for blood donors, Zubeidha, Fahumee's wife (Neena Saleem) is surprised when Asim's blood cross-matches with Fahumee and he looks exactly the same as her son. Mary hosts a party at a resort and is smitten by the resort owner, Maan (Ahmed Asim) while she is forced into a relationship with a wealthy family friend, Shamin. Zaki deals with Fazeela's stepmother to force her marriage with him in order to prove his power. Meanwhile, her father arranges her marriage with an elderly businessman.

== Cast and characters ==
=== Main ===
- Fathimath Fareela as Fazeela
- Mohamed Faisal as Mohamed Asim / Ziyad
- Abdul Latheef as Zaki
- Aminath Rishfa as Mary
- Fathimath Mufliha as Mariyam
- Mariyam Shakeela as Aasha

=== Recurring ===
- Mohamed Rasheed as Fahumee Riza
- Mariyam Haleem as Fazee's step-mother
- Abdulla Naseer as Fazee's father
- Mohamed Rifshan as Rafeeq; Asim's friend
- Neena Saleem as Zubeidha; Ziyad's mother
- Ali Farooq as Husham; Mary's father
- Ahmed Asim as Maan, resort owner

=== Guest ===
- Ahmed Ziya as Ziyad's friend
- Hassan Liam as Ziyad's friend
- Hamdhoon Farooq as Hassan; Maan's friend

== Soundtrack ==
Track listing
No.	Title	Lyrics	Music	Singer(s)	Length
1.	"Karuna Lolugavee Furifaa"	Mausoom Shakir	Ibrahim Zaid Ali	Ibrahim Zaid Ali, Mohamed Abdul Ghanee	4:49
2.	"Vakive Dhiyayas"	Adam Haleem Adnan	Ibrahim Zaid Ali	Ibrahim Zaid Ali, Mariyam Unoosha	4:53
Total length:					9:43
