= Udhaas =

1993 Maldivian film

- Official film poster
- Directed by: Ahmed Nimal
- Written by: Ahmed Sharumeel
- Screenplay by: Ahmed Nimal
- Produced by: Mohamed Rasheed
- Starring: Mohamed Rasheed; Fathimath Rameeza; Waleedha Waleed
- Cinematography: Abdulla Zakee
- Edited by: Ahmed Nimal
- Music by: Mohamed Rashad, Imthiyaz
- Production company: Ocean Films
- Release date: 1993
- Running time: 75 minutes
- Country: Maldives
- Language: Dhivehi

Udhaas is a 1993 Maldivian comedy drama film directed by Ahmed Nimal. Produced by Mohamed Rasheed under Ocean Films, the film stars Rasheed, Fathimath Rameeza and Waleedha Waleed in pivotal roles.

== Premise ==
Shahir (Mohamed Rasheed) is a wealthy businessman who falls in love with a gorgeous woman, Shehenaz (Fathimath Rameeza). Through a phone conversation, Shahir arranges a date with Shehenaz, however, a widow staying in her house, Shareefa (Sithi Fulhu), shows up to the meeting instead of Shehenaz, much to his discomfort. Shehenaz makes a surprise visit to him near his shop and they bond as they continue their conversation about their lives. A romantic relationship begins and together they start planning their future.

After their marriage, Shahir's father (Abdul Raheem) shows up at their doorstep announcing his disapproval for their relationship. However, their trust and love for each other was strong enough to hold them together. Soon after, she is blessed with the news of pregnancy. Their happiness was short lived as Shehenaz discovers that Shahir is already married to an infertile wealthy woman, Nazima (Waleedha Waleed) and together with his family, he is involved in a scam to "use her body" to fulfill the medical limitation of his first wife. Having the fear of them being exposed, Shahir's father ordered him to bring her back to their house at any cost. Betrayed, Shehenaz moves to her born island while Nazima returns to make the life of Shahir miserable.

== Cast ==
- Mohamed Rasheed as Shahir
- Fathimath Rameeza as Shehenaz
- Waleedha Waleed as Nazima
- Abdul Raheem as Shahir's father
- Aminath Ahmed Didi as Sameera; Shahir's mother
- Sithi Fulhu as Shareefa
- Ahmed Nimal as Kaleem
- Waheedha
- Suhail
- Haaroon
- Arif
- Fahumee
- Ahmed Sharumeel as Bento
- Hassan Zareer
- Hamdhan Rasheed
- Ali Shareef
- Mohamed Shareef
- Ali Rasheed
- Adam Saleem
- Aishath

== Soundtrack ==
Track listing
No.	Title	Singer(s)	Length
1.	"Libunee Dheyhaa Khiyaal"	Ali Rameez
2.	"Hithulee Eynaa Beywafa Vee"	Sofa Thaufeeq
3.	"Aee Eki Roalhin"	Ali Rameez

== Release and reception ==
Upon release, the film received positive reviews from critics where the effort of its director was applauded for "carefully layering the romance and emotions with a pinch of humor", all thanks to the fabulous performance of Sithi Fulhu. Actor Rasheed picked the film as his personal "best performance" from his career. Soon after the release of the film, Rasheed took a break from acting citing the need to take treatment for psoriasis.

== Accolades ==
Award	Category	Recipients	Result	Ref(s)
1st Gaumee Film Awards	Best Dialogue	Fathimath Rameeza, Ahmed Sharumeel	Won	
