= 24 Gadi Iru =

- Official film poster
- Directed by: Yoosuf Shafeeu; Mohamed Rasheed
- Written by: Mohamed Rasheed
- Screenplay by: Mohamed Rasheed
- Produced by: Ismail Shafeeq; Mohamed Rasheed
- Starring: Yoosuf Shafeeu; Fathimath Azifa; Sara Mayrhuber, Hassan Manik, Ahmed Aman
- Cinematography: Ibrahim Moosa
- Edited by: Ahmed Nimal
- Music by: Mohamed Ikram
- Production company: Hi-Raid Productions
- Release date: August 28, 2014
- Country: Maldives
- Language: Dhivehi

24 Gadi Iru (lit: 24 hours) is a 2014 Maldivian suspense thriller film directed by Yoosuf Shafeeu and Mohamed Rasheed. Co-produced by Ismail Shafeeq and Mohamed Rasheed under Hi-Raid Productions, the film stars Yoosuf Shafeeu, Fathimath Azifa and Sara Mayrhuber in pivotal roles. The film was released on 28 August 2014. The film revolved around a romantic relationship between a girl diagnosed with mental illness and her psychiatrist. Production of the film began in 2010, though it was theatrically released four years later.

== Plot ==
Reesha, a girl with bipolar disorder and heart problem, Fell in love with her psychiatrist Dr. Visham. Visham treats his patients with love and care, so Reesha mistaken it as true love. However, Visham is married to a foreigner named Sara, and doesn't have any feelings for Reesha. Reesha is adamant, and want to marry Visham at any cost. She threatened him to commit suicide and frame him for having an affair with her. Visham rebuked her words as she only threatened to commit suicide.

However, Reesha, actually committed suicide, and her father beg Visham to marry her. Visham, agreed to marry Reesha for only 24 hours, after which he will divorce her. But Reesha turn the table by saying that the 24 hours will be completed the way she wants. Visham spend most night with Reesha and fell for her. This had a negative impact on Visham and Sara's relationship, and Sara started to feel insecure.

Reesha's heart problem became worse. She tell Visham through a letter that she misunderstood his treatment for his love and wanted to Marry and have kids with him. She confess that she wanted to separate Visham and Sara, and was pregnant with his child. She beg Visham for his forgiveness and request him to upbring their child with Sara.

The film ends with Sara accepting, Reesha's child and upbringing him with Visham.

== Cast ==
- Yoosuf Shafeeu as Dr. Visham. A psychiatrist, Sara and Reesha's husband
- Fathimath Azifa as Reesha, Visham's second wife
- Koyya Hassan Manik as Hamid, Reesha's father
- Sara Mayrhuber as Dr. Sara. A gynaecologist, Visham's first wife
- Muflihaa as Fareedha, Reesha's personal nurse.
- Mohamed Waheed as Bakur
- Mohamed Rasheed as Yasir
- Ahmed Aman Ali as doctor
- Ahmed Rifau as office boy
- Fathimath Eera as patient
- Maisha Ahmed as receptionist
- Mariyam Sama as secretary
- Nashith as secretary

== Soundtrack ==
Track listing
No.	Title	Lyrics	Music	Singer(s)	Length
1.	"Forever in Love"	Mohamed Ikram	Mohamed Ikram	Mariyam Unoosha
2.	"Sandhuravirey"	Mohamed Abdul Ghanee	Hussain Nifar	Khadheeja Mohamed, Mohamed Abdul Ghanee
3.	"In the Rain"	Ismail Mubarik	Ibrahim Zaid Ali	Andhala Haleem
4.	"Beehilumakun"	Shiuz		Shiuz
5.	"Destiny"			Mariyam Unoosha, Basith

== Release and reception ==
The film was released on 28 August 2014. The film was released after being in production for four years. The film received mixed reception from critics. Ahmed Nadheem of Haveeru favored the background music, starting of film and its execution while criticizing the flow of its presentation; "The flow of the film was lost after a sudden and led to a rushed climax creating no suspense or whatsoever. The film failed to be marked as a "different" film but the work is encouraging".

== Accolades ==
Award	Category	Recipients	Result	Ref.
8th Gaumee Film Awards	Best Original Song	Mohamed Ikram for "Forever in Love"	Won	
8th Gaumee Film Awards	Best Female Playback Singer	Mariyam Unoosha for "Forever in Love"	Won	
8th Gaumee Film Awards	Best Sound Mixing	Mohamed Ikram	Nominated	
