= Hagu An'bi =

- Official film poster
- Directed by: Mohamed Aboobakuru
- Written by: Mohamed Aboobakuru; Wadheefa
- Screenplay by: Mohamed Aboobakuru
- Produced by: Mohamed Munadhis
- Starring: Mohamed Aboobakuru; Niuma Mohamed; Nafeesa Ali
- Cinematography: Mohamed Rasheed
- Edited by: Mohamed Musthafa Hussain
- Production company: Faransa Films
- Release date: 1996
- Country: Maldives
- Language: Dhivehi

Hagu An'bi is a 1996 Maldivian romantic film directed by Mohamed Aboobakuru. Produced by Mohamed Munadhis under Faransa Films, the film stars Mohamed Aboobakuru, Niuma Mohamed and Nafeesa Ali in pivotal roles. The film was an unofficial remake of Saawan Kumar Tak-directed film Bewaffa Se Waffa (1992), starring Juhi Chawla, Nagma and Vivek Mushran in lead roles. The story revolves around a love triangle and the complexities that arise when two best friends have to marry the same man.

== Premise ==
The film revolves around two close friends, Rahuma (Niuma Mohamed) and Najuma (Nafeesa Ali), who share a deep love for each other. However, their lives take an unexpected turn when they both marry the same man, Ahmed (Mohamed Aboobakuru), as Rahuma is unable to conceive. In a selfless act, Rahuma urges her best friend Najuma to marry Ahmed to fulfill his dreams of having a family. Despite the pain, Najuma agrees, hoping for their collective happiness.

Upon marrying Ahmed, Najuma becomes pregnant during their honeymoon trip, bringing joy to the entire family. Unfortunately, their happiness is disrupted by Najuma's manipulative elder sister (Arifa Ibrahim) and her brother-in-law, Ajuwad (Chilhiya Moosa Manik) who seek to seize their wealth. Their scheming creates a rift between Ahmed and Rahuma. Influenced by them, Ahmed is convinced that Najuma cannot coexist with a barren woman, as it poses a threat to her pregnancy. The narrative takes an unexpected twist when Rahuma becomes pregnant, triggering doubt in Najuma's mind about Rahuma's motives. Fearing the worst, Najuma decides to take matters into her own hands, leading to further complications.

== Cast ==
- Mohamed Aboobakuru as Ahmed
- Niuma Mohamed as Rahuma
- Nafeesa Ali as Najuma
- Chilhiya Moosa Manik as Ajuwad
- Arifa Ibrahim as Najuma's sister
- Ibrahim Shakir as Kaleyfaan; Ahmed's grandfather
- Sithi Fulhu as Raziyya
- Hassan Shakir as Afeef
- Aminath Ahmed Didi as Doctor
- Mohamed Azim as a magistrate
- Adam Faheem
- Shaheedha Moosa
- Ahmed Naseem
- Mahdhu
- Ahmed Rukhshan
- Ahmed Ibrahim
- Mufliha as Rahuma's friend
- Safoora
- Mariyam
- Aishath
- Thahumeena
- Rifqa Zameel
- Aishath Reesha

== Soundtrack ==
Track listing
No.	Title	Lyrics	Music	Singer(s)	Length
1.	"Aavaahaa Fari Soora Ey"	Ahmed Sharumeel	Monus	Abdul Hannan Moosa Didi
2.	"Dhusheeme Loabi Yaarekey"	Ahmed Sharumeel	Monus	Abdul Hannan Moosa Didi, Fathimath Iraadhaa
3.	"Dhen Roifa Dhefaigaa Hifee"	Ahmed Sharumeel	Monus	Fathimath Zoona
4.	"Ey Dhen Beywafaavee"	Ahmed Sharumeel	Monus	Fathimath Zoona
5.	"Mi Leygaa Baaru Hin'ganee"	Hussain Rameez	Monus	Abdul Hannan Moosa Didi

== Accolades ==
Year	Award	Category	Recipients	Result	Ref.
1997	Aafathis Awards – 1996	Best Supporting Actor	Chilhiya Moosa Manik	Won	
1997	Aafathis Awards – 1996	Best Cinematography	Mohamed Rasheed	Won	
