= Mohamed Rasheed (actor) =

Maldivian actor

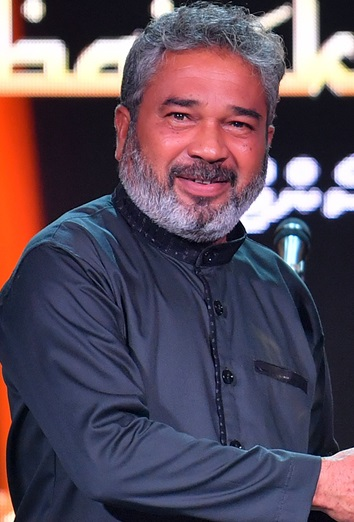
- Rasheed at 9th Gaumee Film Awards ceremony, 2019
- Born: 2 April 1964 (age 62); Male', Maldives
- Occupations: Actor, cinematographer, producer, director
- Years active: 1981–present

Mohamed Rasheed (2 April 1964), professionally known as Dharaa Rasheed, is a Maldivian film actor, cinematographer, producer and director.

== Early life ==
At the age of twelve, Rasheed along with his friends, Sodhiq and Kashima Ahmed Shakir, used to spend most of their times at his place, singing, playing table tennis and undertake Urdu classes. After completing his studies at Majeediyya School, Rasheed witnessed several cameras being carried to the recently developed broadcasting company, Television Maldives and decided to be a cameraman. During the time, him, along with other friends, Umar Zahir and guitarist Abdul Rauf used to perform music at small gatherings. At the age of seventeen, he applied to Television Maldives to work as a cameraman but his application was rejected due to no vacancy. However, an year later, he was approached by Television Maldives to work with them.

== Career ==
In 1981, on their anniversary of Television Maldives, they selected few staff to develop a film, Natheeja and he was roped in to play the lead role of the film as a replacement to the staff who backed from the project at the last minute. Soon after the filming, Rasheed moved to F. Feeali, uncertain of how the film will be perceived by the audience. He returns to Male', after the screening of the film and was startled to witness the positive reaction from the audience. At the time, he was considered an "overnight superstar" by the media.

The following year, he starred in another production from Television Maldives, Sazaa, free of charge. Afterwards, he played the lead role in the film Emme Maleh Ekani, Kandu Roadhi and Orchid – Eynaage Maa which was considered a pathbreaking film in local cinema. The song "Angaidheyshey Adhuvee Ruhigen" included in the film is an all-time classic song.

In 1987, Rasheed was featured in two films; Chuttee alongside Ismail Wajeeh and Haali. He also played a main role opposite Mariyam Rasheedha in Hussain Shihab and Hassan Najumee's drama film Ithubaaru (1987). Some dialogues she used in the film were considered to be the "most iconic dialogues" in the history of Maldivian cinema. He was again cast opposite Rasheedha in Najumee's another drama film Ley Karuna (1988), released during the following year, which follows the separation of two siblings and their reunion. The film marked a breakthrough to Rasheed's career and is noted to be his first paid film.

In 1993, he produced and starred in Ahmed Nimal's romantic comedy film Udhaas (1993), playing the role of a wealthy businessman who marries a second woman to cover up for his infertile first wife. The film and his performance received positive reviews from critics. Rasheed picked the film as his personal "best performance" from his career. Soon after the release of the film, Rasheed took a break from acting citing the need to take treatment for psoriasis.

In 2005, he graduated with a Master diploma in Visual Communication from the Film Academy based in Uttar Pradesh, India. Following the hiatus, he made a comeback to screen with Moomin Fuad's suspense thriller Happy Birthday (2009) which narrates the story of a simple man who receives a call on his birthday informing that his wife and son have been kidnapped, only to be returned for a ransom. A total of five shows with little occupancy were screened at the cinema, declaring the film a commercial failure, despite the positive response from the critics. Winning five Gaumee Film Awards and twelve Maldives Film Awards, the film was also screened at the Venice Film Festival.

The following year, he starred alongside Ali Seezan and Mariyam Afeefa in Abdul Faththaah's horror film Jinni which was based on true stories that occurred in an island of Maldives. Upon release, the film received mixed reviews from critics; majority of them complaining for having the "same old feeling" of prior horror flicks though the performance were noted to be satisfactory. Despite the mixed reviews, the film witnessed a positive response at the box office. This was followed by Ahmed Nimal's horror film Zalzalaa En'buri Aun (2010) starred oppsoted Yoosuf Shafeeu, Sheela Najeeb and Mohamed Manik. It was a spin-off to Aslam Rasheed's horror classic film Zalzalaa (2000) starring, Ibrahim Wisan, Ali Shameel and Niuma Mohamed. The film revolves around a mariage blanc, a murder of husband by his wife with secret lover and avenging of his death from everyone involved in the crime. He played the role of Latheef, a police inspector who investigates the mysterious murders. The film received mixed response from critics and it did average business at box office.

In 2011, he played the role of Mohamed Jaleel, a wealthy man who is married to a religious woman and a gluttonous young woman, in the Moomin Fuad-directed crime tragedy drama Loodhifa. Featuring an ensemble cast, the film deals with several social issues in the society told from different perspectives of the characters. Made on a budget of MVR 600,000, the film was declared a commercial failure though it received wide critical acclaim, praising the performance of cast and the film's "realism" in its language, characters and their attitude.

In 2014, he starred opposite Yoosuf Shafeeu and Fathimath Azifa in the suspense thriller film 24 Gadi Iru (2014) which was co-directed by him and Shafeeu. The film focuses on a romantic relationship between a girl diagnosed with mental illness and her psychiatrist. Production of the film began in 2010, though it was theatrically released four years later. Abdul Faththaah's romantic drama Hahdhu was his next film release which touches upon controversial issues in the Maldives including the depiction of flogging and also shines a light on mental health issues such as suicide. The film opened to mixed reviews from critics though it emerged as one of the highest grossing Maldivian films of the year.

== Filmography ==
=== Feature film ===
Year	Title	Role	Notes	Ref(s)
1981	Natheeja			
1981	Sazaa			
1982	Orchid – Eynaage Maa	Nisham		
1984	Chuttee			
1984	Haali			
1987	Ithubaaru	Riyaz		
1988	Ley Karuna	Ali Shifaz		
1993	Udhaas	Shahir	Also the producer	
2009	Happy Birthday	Asif's office boss		
2010	Jinni	Azeem		
2010	Dhin Veynuge Hithaamaigaa	Himself	Special appearance in the song "Annaashey Hinithun Velamaa"	
2010	Zalzalaa En'buri Aun	Latheef		
2011	Loodhifa	Mohamed Jaleel		
2011	E Bappa	Adhurey	Special appearance	
2014	24 Gadi Iru	Yasir	Also the co-director, co-producer and writer	
2017	Hahdhu	Firag		
2019	Bavathi	Shakir		
2020	Andhirikan	Faththaah		
2024	Mee Ishq	MP Saeed		
2024	Kamanaa	Abbas		
2025	Ilzaam	Rashid		
2025	Alwadhaau	Doctor		
2026	Gilan	Shathir		
2026	Jannath			
2026	Keevve? †			

=== Television ===
Year	Title	Role	Notes	Ref(s)
2000	Reysham	Nashid	Guest role; "Episode 20"	
2012–2013	Adhives Eloaibah Gadharu Kuran	Fahumee Riza	Recurring role	
2008	Hinithun Velaashey Kalaa	Waheed's lawyer	Guest role; "Episode 50" and "Episode 52"	
2021	Hatharu Manzaru	Rasheed	In the segment "Hayaaiy"	
2022	Vihaali	Nashid	Main role in the segment "Rahmedhu"	
2022	Dhoadhi	Mohamed	Main role; 15 episodes	
2022	Rimsha	Fiyaz's brother	Recurring role; 3 episodes	
2024	Yaaraa	Zeyba's father	Guest role; "Episode 26"	
2025	Hinthaa	Najeeb	Recurring role; 4 episodes	
2025	Feshumaai Nimun	Rasheed	Main role; 6 episodes	
2025	Moosun	Irfan Adhil	Main role; 10 episodes	

=== Other work ===
Year	Title	Director	Producer	Writer	Camera	Notes	Ref(s)
1993	Udhaas		Yes			Feature film	
1996	Hagu An'bi				Yes	Feature film	
2014	24 Gadi Iru	Yes	Yes	Yes		Feature film	

== Accolades ==
Year	Award	Category	Nominated work	Result	Ref(s)
1997	Aafathis Award - 1996	Best Cinematography	Hagu An'bi	Won	
2005	National Award of Recognition	Performing Arts - Acting		Won	
2019	9th Gaumee Film Awards	Lifetime Achievement Award		Won	
2023	NKFA Bangkok International Film Festival – 2023	Lifetime Achievement Award		Won	
