= Sofa Thaufeeq =

Maldivian female singer

Sofa Thowfeek
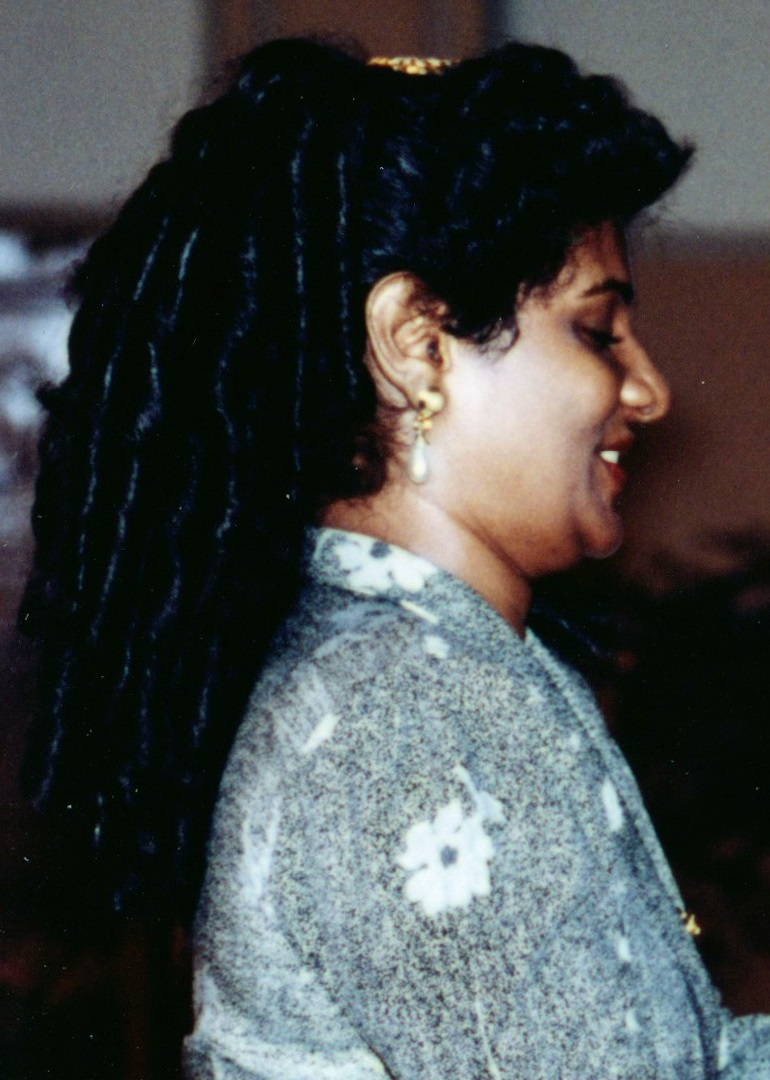
- Thaufeeq receiving the National Award of Recognition, 1996
- Born: 11 August 1967 (age 58); Male', Maldives
- Occupation: Playback singer
- Years active: 1985–present
- Musical career
- Genres: Pop; filmi; electronic
- Instrument: Vocals

Sofa Thowfeek commonly spelled as Sofa Thaufeeq (11 August 1967) is a Maldivian singer.

== Early life and career ==
Sofa Thaufeeq was born on 11 August 1967. Her father, Mohamed Thaufeeq was mostly known for his strong voice in the radio program Keerithi Rasoolaage Siyarathu while her mother, Aishath Fareedha is a homemaker and singer. She is the sister of notable local playback singers Shifa Thaufeeq and Asim Thaufeeq. At the age of eight, she was selected in her school's chorus group, where she started singing and performing on school concerts and locals events.

While studying in Aminiya School, she performed the song "Hindhu Emaa Kan'du Thereyn" in the year's national event drill. The performance caught the eyes of several music composers which enabled her to ge the breakthrough in film industry. During her last year of study, she was awarded as the best performer from the senior age group in Interschool Singing Competition. In 1985, she rendered the song "Haalathu Adhu Mivanee" for the film Fidhaa which became an instant chartbuster among the music listeners. The song "Maheynethidhaane" from the album Varihama and featuring actors, Aishath Shiranee and Ahmed Ghiyas is noted to be one of the most iconic songs performed by Thaufeeq.

In 1996, the Government of Maldives honoured her with the National Award of Recognition, which she attributed as her biggest achievement. She then becomes a consistent face on stage shows including "Galaxy", "Muziky Fannaanuge Show" and other local events and shows. Apart from singing, she became a mentor for students participating in the Interschool Singing Competition and also penned lyrics for several of the songs performed by her for the albums including, Ranmuiy (1996) and Ranthari (1997). According to Thaufeeq, the album Handhaan, produced by herself, is the closes project to her as the album consists of songs recorded by her family members including, her mother and father. The album was released as a memoire of her father, who died while working on the project. Thaufeeq penned few tracks for the album too. Her husband, Hassan Nizam died at the age of 52, in 2015.

== Discography ==
=== Feature Film ===
Year	Film	Song	Lyricist(s)	Co-artist(s)	Notes
1985	Fidhaa	"Haalathu Adhu Mivanee" (Female Version)	Hussain Shihab	Solo	
1985	Fidhaa	"Haalathu Adhu Mivanee" (Duet Version)	Hussain Shihab	Hussain Shihab	
1987	Haali	"Ey Ehan'dhaan Aadhey"	Aminath Faiza	Solo	
1987	Haali	"Dhuniyeygavaa Hurihaa Ufaa"	Hussain Shihab	Solo	
1987	Haali	"Wafaatherikan Nethey Dhuniyeyn"	Hussain Shihab	Solo	
1987	Ithubaaru	"Magey Loa Karunun Baruvee"		Solo	
1987	Ithubaaru	"Dhanna Amaanaaiytherin"		Solo	
1987	Ithubaaru	"Ey Zamaanaa Vaguthu Dhiyaee"	Yoosuf Mohamedfulhu	Solo	
1988	Chuttee	"Loabi Bunedhenhey"		Umar Zahir	
1988	Chuttee	"Chuttee Han'dhaan"		Umar Zahir	
1988	Chuttee	"Aave Hiyy Mi Fureniyyey"		Solo	
1988	Chuttee	"Furigen Hiyy Dhanee"		Solo	
1988	Ley Karuna	"Roalhin Libunu Ufalun"	Kashimaa Ahmed Shakir	Hussain Rasheedh	
1988	Ley Karuna	"Dhin Mi Veyney"	Kashimaa Ahmed Shakir	Solo	
1988	Ley Karuna	"Mulhi Umuraa Hayaathugaa Veynee"	Kashimaa Ahmed Shakir	Solo	
1992	Loabi Veveynee Furaana Dheegen	"Qadharu Dheefaa Viyas"	Kaneeru Abdul Raheem	Solo	
1992	Dhon Manma	"Furi Furi Dheloa"		Solo	
1993	Imthihaan	"Ramzuvi Kulavaru Araa Maley"		Mohamed Rashad	
1993	Imthihaan	"Dhin Thaazaa Dheewaanaavee Asaru"		Mohamed Rashad	
1993	Thuhumathu	"Vaane Dhiriulhumey Mithaa Hama"		Solo	
1993	Thuhumathu	"Maadhan Hoadhaalaashey Buneemey"		Abdul Raoof	
1993	Thuhumathu	"Moonaa Dheloa Maa Reetheeyey"		Abdul Raoof	
1993	Thuhumathu	"Dhen Hoadhidhaanethoa Ey"		Muaviyath Anwar	
1993	Udhaas	"Hithulee Eynaa Beywafaavee"		Solo	
1993	Udhaas	"Shoakhuvaa Hithaa Mey"		Ali Rameez	Appears in Soundtrack album
1993	Mithuru	"Aadhey Thiya Yaaraage Han'dhaan"		Solo	
1993	Mithuru	"Visnifaahey Nuvaa Hiyy Magey" (Female Version)		Solo	
1993	Mithuru	"Ai Mee Bahaarey"		Mohamed Rashad	
1993	Mithuru	"Loabin Bunedheynan"		Mohamed Rashad	
1993	Mithuru	"Huvafenugaa Raajaa Hoadhee"		Mohamed Shahuban	
1993	Vari	"Dheefa Vidhun Bala Nayaavi Chaaloo"	Ahmed Sharumeel	Feeali Abdulla Waheed	
1993	Vari	"Dhen Loabeegaa Uzuru Veethoa"	Ahmed Sharumeel	Feeali Abdulla Waheed	
1993	Vari	"Vaaloabi Nuvey Faraqu Dhehiyy"	Ahmed Sharumeel	Feeali Abdulla Waheed	
1993	Vari	"Magey Thaqudheerugaa Haalathu"	Ahmed Sharumeel	Solo	
1994	Nafrathu	"Rankula Jehi Loabi"	Ali Shameel	Abdul Hannan Moosa Didi	
1994	Nafrathu	"Goanaa Kollaafaa Kalaa"	Ali Shameel	Abdul Hannan Moosa Didi	
1994	Nafrathu	"Ainbehge Vaajibakah"	Ali Shameel	Solo	
1995	Masthu	"Naanaa Dheyhaa Jaan"		Yoosuf Rafeeu	
1995	Masthu	"E Vindhu Vee Himeynvefaa"		Solo	Appears in Soundtrack album
1995	Masthu	"Nunidheythee Mi Dheloa Faaruvanee"		Solo	Appears in Soundtrack album
1995	Dhushman	"Nudhey Nudhey Nudhey"		Solo	
1995	Dhushman	"Loabeege Mee Inthihaa"		Solo	
1999	Loabiveriyaa	"Vaa Meygaa Vindhaa"	Mariyam Waheedha	Ahmed Amir (Slam)	
1999	Umurah	"Hiyy Ruhey Hiyy Edhey"	Mausoom Shakir	Asim Thaufeeq	
1999	Nuruhunvi Loabi	"Hen'dhunaa O Hen'dhunaa"	Ahmed Sharumeel	Solo	
2000	Ajaaib	"Nidhifa Ovefaathoa"	Sofa Thaufeeq	Solo	
2000	Ajaaib	"Govaalee Ruheythoa"	Sofa Thaufeeq	Solo	
2000	Ajaaib	"Moosun Mi Edhey Chaal"	Sofa Thaufeeq	Abdul Hannan Moosa Didi	
2000	Ajaaib	"Veyn Libeyneehey"	Ahmed Sharumeel	Asim Thaufeeq	

=== Non Film Songs ===
Year	Film	Song	Lyricist(s)	Co-artist(s)	Notes
1982	Single	"Hindhu Emaa Kan'dutherey"	Moosa Ali	Solo	
1982	Single	"Dharivarun Dhaskurey"		Solo	
1982	Single	"Fennanee Ethurifaavaa Mi Kudhi Rahthakey"		Solo	
1983	Single	"Roohey Falastheenaa Gulhifaavee"		Abdulla Hassan	
1983	Single	"Baaru Baaru Dheyshey"		Solo	
1989	Galaxyge Therein	"Moosum Mee Ai Zamaaney"		Solo	
1990	Maaburaa Kokaa	"Qadharu Dheefaa Viyas"	Kaneeru Abdul Raheem	Solo	
1991	Telethone '91	"Fisaari Thedhey"		Solo	
1992	Galaxyge Therein 3	"Ekuveeyey Ufalaa Kuraa Khiyaal"		Solo	
1992	Galaxyge Therein 3	"Magey Hithugaa Thadhaa Veynee"		Solo	
1992	Bahaaru Moosum 2	"Ramzuvi Kulavaru Araa Maley"		Mohamed Rashad	
1992	Bahaaru Moosum 2	"Dhin Thaazaa Dheewaanaavee Asaru"		Mohamed Rashad	
1992	Bahaaru Moosum 2	"Loabivaatheeyey Magey"		Mohamed Rashad	
1992	Bahaaru Moosum 2	"Dhee Jaanu Hithaa Ekugaa"		Mohamed Rashad	
1992	Bahaaru Moosum 2	"Loabivaa Ey Ma Kiyaa Kiyaa"		Mohamed Rashad	
1993	Saalhan'ga	"Buney Buney Hus Haasaru Mee"		Mohamed Shahuban	
1993	Saalhan'ga	"Hin'gaashey Hin'gaashey"		Mohamed Fuwad (Ford)	
1993	Saalhan'ga	"Reyaa Dhuvaalu Visnenee"		Fenthashi Mohamed Khaleel, Hussain Rasheed	
1994	Han'dhuvaru	"Dheyhaa Khiyaal Vee Noonhey"		Mohamed Manik	
1994	Han'dhuvaru	"Ishqun Mihayaathaa Kulhelaafa"		Solo	
1994	Han'dhuvaru	"Veynekey Ishqu Dhey"		Solo	
1994	Loodhifaa	"Bunee Faalhugaa Noonekeyhey"	Kaneeru Abdul Raheem	Ali Rasheed (Stepin)	
1995	Farimaa	"Noonekey Insaanekey Thiyaa"		Ahmed Rasheed (Hulhudheli)	
1995	Han'dhaan	"Miee Thiya Maqaamey"	Easa Shareef	Solo	
1995	Han'dhaan	"Jaanun Ehaa Fidhaavegen" (Female Version)		Solo	
1995	Han'dhaan	"Mihiyy Adhi Nudhevifaa"		Moomin Fuad	
1995	Hiyyvaru	"Beynunveyey In'geythoa"	Abdulla Rasheed	Solo	
1995	Ranhaaru	"Annaathee Ladhun Heevey Hurihen"	Mausoom Shakir	Solo	
1995	Ranhaaru	"Neydhemey Dhen Alun"	Mausoom Shakir	Solo	
1995	Thaubeeru	"Samaasaa Samaasaa Thakun"	Easa Shareef	Abdul Hannan Moosa Didi	
1995	Thaubeeru	"Insaanekey Furihamavee"		Mohamed Manik	
1996	Dhiwaana	"Dheewaanaavi Hiyy Hiyy Hiyy"		Solo	
1996	Dhiwaana	"Thuraa Vaneeyey"	Ehsaan	Abdul Hannan Moosa Didi	
1996	Ihthifaaq	"Hen'dhunaa O Hen'dhunaa"	Ahmed Sharumeel	Solo	
1996	Ihthifaaq	"Dheebey Mee Dhivehi Ley"		Asim Thaufeeq	
1996	Ranmuiy	"Thiya Moonah Balaalaa"	Sofa Thaufeeq	Abdul Hannan Moosa Didi	
1996	Ranmuiy	"Ladhugannanee"	Sofa Thaufeeq	Abdul Hannan Moosa Didi	
1996	Ranmuiy	"Moosum Mi Edhey Chaal"	Sofa Thaufeeq	Abdul Hannan Moosa Didi	
1996	Ranmuiy	"Aawaaraa Vee Hiyy Magey"	Sofa Thaufeeq	Solo	
1996	Ranmuiy	"Khaassa Dharaja Dhevijjey"	Sofa Thaufeeq	Solo	
1996	Ranmuiy	"Vakivumun Bunamey"	Sofa Thaufeeq	Solo	
1996	Ranmuiy	"Hey Husvey Khiyaal Dhoa"	Sofa Thaufeeq	Solo	
1996	Ranmuiy	"Kiyun Ishqakee Mi Raahathey"	Sofa Thaufeeq	Solo	
1996	Ranmuiy	"Faalhuthoa Mivee"	Sofa Thaufeeq	Solo	
1996	Ranmuiy	"Ey Dhen Hiyy Ahaaney"	Sofa Thaufeeq	Solo	
1996	Ranmuiy	"Nidhifa Ovefaathoa"	Sofa Thaufeeq	Solo	
1996	Ranmuiy	"Bichuleh Araa Gaigayey"	Sofa Thaufeeq	Solo	
1996	Varihama	"Maheynethidhaaney"	Mohamed Fuwad (Ford)	Ali Nizam	
1996	Varihama	"Thunfaiy Dheloa Fenifaa Mirey"		Mohamed Fuwad (Ford)	
1996	Varihama	"Roalhi Vayaa Raalhu Nagaa"		Solo	
1996	Single	"Goahun Gendhiyaa"		Solo	
1997	Furusathu	"Magey Jaanaa"		Asim Thaufeeq	
1997	Furusathu	"Dhin Mee Asaru"		Asim Thaufeeq	
1997	Ranthari	"Bahdhalu Dhen Thoa Aee Vaan"	Sofa Thaufeeq	Umar Zahir	
1997	Ranthari	"Bunaashey Hiyy Nagaa"	Sofa Thaufeeq	Asim Thaufeeq	
1997	Ranthari	"Dhanveema Ujaalaathoa"	Sofa Thaufeeq	Mohamed Shahuban	
1997	Ranthari	"Emoonun Beevaa Neyvaa Dhey"	Sofa Thaufeeq	Ali Rameez	
1997	Ranthari	"Miee Adhu Naseebey"	Sofa Thaufeeq	Ali Rameez	
1997	Ranthari	"Faalhuveemaa Buneythoa"	Sofa Thaufeeq	Abdul Hannan Moosa Didi	
1997	Ranthari	"Saadhaa Thi Mooney"	Sofa Thaufeeq	Abdul Hannan Moosa Didi	
1997	Ranthari	"Yaaraa O Yaaraa"	Sofa Thaufeeq	Abdul Hannan Moosa Didi	
1997	Ranthari	"Nayaa Zamaan Mee"	Sofa Thaufeeq	Mohamed Rashad	
1997	Ranthari	"Uraalanee Uraalanee"	Sofa Thaufeeq	Mohamed Rashad	
1997	Single	"Ruhi Beyqaraaru Vey"		Asim Thaufeeq	
1998	Kuran'gi	"Ey Khiyaaleh Dhee Dhen"	Ismail Wajeeh	Ismail Wajeeh	
1998	Kuran'gi	"Hiyy Haasvedhaaney"	Ismail Wajeeh	Asim Thaufeeq	
1998	Kuran'gi	"Fenifa Fenifa Gendhan"		Asim Thaufeeq	
1998	Kuran'gi	"Hoadhamaa Fenidhaanebaa"	Kaneeru Abdul Raheem	Abdul Hannan Moosa Didi	
1998	Kuran'gi	"Shaamil Veemaa Yaaraa"	Ahmed Sharumeel	Umar Zahir	
1998	Vidhuvaru	"Veyn Libeyneehey"	Ahmed Sharumeel	Asim Thaufeeq	
1998	Vidhuvaru	"Adhi Zuvaan Hiyy Edheythee"	Zahidha Ibrahim	Asim Thaufeeq	
1999	Jalparee	"Vaa Meygaa Vindhaa"	Mariyam Waheedha	Ahmed Amir (Slam)	
1999	Jalparee	"Annaaneyey Heeveyey"	Mariyam Waheedha	Solo	
2003	Dheraha	"Fenigen Kalaa Hoadhey"		Solo	
2004	Mainaa	"Noorey Thee Noorey"		Asim Thaufeeq	
2004	Mainaa	"Hiyy Thelhey Goiy Vey"		Asim Thaufeeq	
2020	Single	"Covid Dhuaa"		Solo	
2020	Eid Majaa 1441	"Gellidhanee Gaimey"	Hussain Sobah	Hassan Jalaal	

== Accolades ==
Year	Award	Category	Nominated work	Result	Ref(s)
—N/a	Interschool Singing Competition	Best Performer - Senior Age Group		Won	
1996	National Award of Recognition	Performing Arts - Singing		Won	
