= Kan'du Ibilees =

- Official film poster
- Directed by: Ismail Rasheed
- Written by: Mohamed Rasheed
- Screenplay by: Mohamed Rasheed
- Produced by: Ismail Rasheed; Ahmed Ziya; Mohamed Riffath
- Starring: Ismail Rasheed; Ahmed Ziya
- Cinematography: Ismail Moosa
- Edited by: Ahmed Ziya
- Music by: Ibrahim Nifar
- Production company: Independent Zone
- Release date: 5 December 2018
- Country: Maldives
- Language: Dhivehi

Kan'du Ibilees is a 2018 Maldivian children's film directed by Ismail Rasheed. Produced by Rasheed, Ahmed Ziya and Mohamed Riffath under Independent Zone, the film stars Ismail Rasheed and Ahmed Ziya in pivotal roles. Filming commenced on 30 January 2018 at HDh. Kulhudhuffushi and was completed within ten days. The film was screened on 5 December 2018 at HDh. Kulhudhuffushi Thiladhekunu Cinema and is scheduled to officially release at Olympus Cinema on 1 February 2019.

== Plotline ==
The film follows Kan'du Ibilees when he was sent on a mission by his boss to a faraway village with exclusive instructions to corrupt the mind of children where he befriends with students and distract them from their studies. He successfully keeps accomplishing his mission before two smart kids suspect his dubious character and spy on him under the guidance of the village Sheikh. Eventually, them along with the villagers, outsmart Kan'du Ibilees and burned him to flames. He then ventures off to find a new mission.

== Cast ==
- Ismail Rasheed as Kan'du Ibilees
- Ahmed Ziya
- Mariyam Ahmed
- Mohamed Azzam Hameed
- Abdulla Waheed
- Shiyama Ali

== Music ==
The promotional song of the film, "Ibileehuge Vasvaas" which is performed by Bidhabin Bodeberu Group was released in March 2018.

== Release ==
The film was screened at HDh. Kulhudhuffushi Thiladhekunu Cinema on 5 December 2018.
