= Dhumah Eri Thari =

2001 Maldivian drama film

- Official film poster
- Directed by: Mohamed Abdul Hakeem
- Written by: Mohamed Abdul Hakeem
- Screenplay by: Mohamed Abdul Hakeem
- Produced by: Hussain Rasheed
- Starring: Ahmed Asim; Aishath Humeydha; Raifa Yoosuf; Mohamed Abdul Hakeem
- Cinematography: Mohamed Nasheed; Mohamed Abdul Hakeem
- Edited by: Mohamed Abdul Hakeem
- Music by: Mohamed Abdul Hakeem
- Production company: Farivaa Films
- Release date: May 10, 2001
- Country: Maldives
- Language: Dhivehi

Dhumah Eri Thari is a 2001 Maldivian drama film written and directed by Mohamed Abdul Hakeem. Produced by Hussain Rasheed under Farivaa Films, the film stars Ahmed Asim, Aishath Humeydha, Raifa Yoosuf and Mohamed Abdul Hakeem in pivotal roles. The film narrates the story of two sisters who are ready to sacrifice their own happiness for the sake of the other.

== Plot ==
Sithura and Thasleema are two orphans and exemplary siblings who unconditionally love each other. Thasleema treats her younger sister like a mother. Javid, a law graduate, returns to his island and starts a romantic relationship with Sithura, while Thasleema is smitten by him but too timid to reveal her feelings. Javid's mother arranges his marriage with Thasleema. The latter shares the news with Sithura, who rejoices in her sister's happiness with a broken heart. To pave the way into her sister's joy, Sithura marries a thug, Ajuwad, despite Thasleema's disapproval. The two sisters separate and walk in their own path until fate brings them together ruining Thasleema's gleeful life.

== Cast ==
- Ahmed Asim as Javid
- Aishath Humeydha as Fathimath Sithura
- Raifa Yoosuf as Thasleema
- Mohamed Abdul Hakeem as Ajuwad Hassan
- Mohamed Ibrahim
- Haajara Abdul Kareem as Dhon Kaiydha; Javid's mother
- Suheil
- Suzeyn
- Ahmed Ibrahim
- Ahmed Anwar
- Aishath Gulfa
- Ahmed Naseem
- Dhon Kamana
- Baby Zayan
- Baby Zeeko

== Soundtrack ==
Track listing
No.	Title	Singer(s)	Length
1.	"Hithuge Raanee Vedheyshey Iquraaru"	Ali Rameez

== Response ==
Upon release, the film received mixed to positive reviews from critics, where the performance of the lead actors were praised though the predictable storyline was lauded for its melodrama.
