= Karuna (1994 film) =

- Official film poster
- Directed by: Ibrahim Rasheed
- Written by: Ibrahim Rasheed
- Screenplay by: Ibrahim Rasheed
- Produced by: Hussain Rasheed
- Starring: Hassan Afeef; Lillian Saeed
- Cinematography: Abdulla Shujau
- Edited by: Abdulla Shujau
- Music by: Mohamed Madheeh
- Production company: Farivaa Films
- Release date: 1994
- Country: Maldives
- Language: Dhivehi

Karuna is a 1994 Maldivian film written and directed by Ibrahim Rasheed. Produced by Hussain Rasheed under Farivaa Films, the film stars Hassan Afeef, Lillian Saeed and Ali Firaq in pivotal roles. The film follows two friends and business partners who fall in love with the same girl and their battle to pursue her love.

== Premise ==
Nadheem, a timid and reticent young man, performs at a party which catches the attention of Shaanee. Both Nadheem and his friend and business partner, Siraj fall in love with Shaanee and decide to propose her separately and accept the fate Shaanee decides. As both put forth their proposals, Shaanee favored Nadheem, hurting Siraj's sentiments. Meanwhile, Nadheem and Shaanee concurrently sees a dream where an unknown person murders Nadheem as they were spending time together. As she shares the dream with her father, he narrates a similar incident happened to her parents where they saw a dream of Shaanee's mother being murdered and the incidents happening in real life a month later.

Realizing Shaanee's affection towards Nadheem, her father meets him in person and conveys approval for their marriage. As Nadheem plans his wedding with Shaanee, Siraj attempts to mislead Nadheem saying Adam Manik is greedy of their business and wealth. Despite Siraj's efforts to sabotage the marriage, Nadheem takes Shaanee and gives a tour of his home. Siraj takes the opportunity to distract Nadheem and conspires against him with the help of their servant, Reki Futhu. Believing the rumor, Shaanee breaks off their wedding but Nadheem vows to wait for her return. Siraj, goes to Shaanee's house promising Nadheem to make amendments in their relationship but makes it worse and tarnishes his reputation, ultimately bringing Shaanee into his life.

== Cast ==
- Hassan Afeef as Nadheem
- Lillian Saeed as Shaanee
- Ali Firaq as Siraj
- Chilhiya Moosa Manik as Adam Manik
- Ahmed Saleem
- Jamaal
- Michael Francis
- Ibrahim Yauqoob
- Abdul Ghafoor
- Ahandhey as shopkeeper

== Soundtrack ==
Track listing
No.	Title	Lyrics	Singer(s)	Length
1.	"Yaaraa Moonu Saadhaa"		Abdulla Waheedh (Feeali)
2.	"Adhabu Nudheyshey Kalaage Loabin"	Easa Shareef	Abdulla Waheedh (Feeali), Aminath Hussain
3.	"E Ufaathakaa"	Umar Zahir	Umar Zahir

== Response ==
The film was released in 1994. Upon release, the film received critical success where the story and performances of the lead actors, particularly that of Hassan Afeef's was praised by the critics, applauding the range of emotions and skills portrayed in the film.

== Accolades ==
Award	Category	Recipients	Result	Ref(s)
1st Gaumee Film Awards	Best Melody	Umar Zahir	Won	
1st Gaumee Film Awards	Best Special Effects	Hussain Rasheed	Won	
