= Ley Karuna =

1988 Maldivian film

- Official film poster
- Directed by: Hassan Najumee
- Written by: Ahmed Sharumeel
- Produced by: Ibrahim Mohamed Solih
- Starring: Mohamed Rasheed; Mariyam Rasheedha; Ahmed Sharumeel
- Cinematography: Hassan Maumoon
- Edited by: Mohamed Nazeeer
- Music by: Mohamed Rashad
- Release date: 29 March 1988
- Country: Maldives
- Language: Dhivehi

Ley Karuna is a 1988 Maldivian film directed by Hassan Najumee. Produced by Ibrahim Mohamed Solih, the film stars Mohamed Rasheed, Mariyam Rasheedha and Ahmed Sharumeel in lead roles. The film marked a breakthrough to Mohamed Rasheed's career and is noted to be his first paid film. The film was released on 29 March 1988.

== Premise ==
Ali (Mohamed Rasheed) and Mohamed (Ahmed Sharumeel) are two exemplary siblings, who always have each other's back. An unfortunate incident leads Mohamed being handicapped while Ali gets the chance to study in Male'. Years later, Ali stopped writing to Mohamed though the latter desperately waits for a news from him. Ali, now named as Shifaz, lives with a well educated and modern family, where he starts a romantic relationship with the landlord's daughter, Zaina (Mariyam Rasheedha). Her parents fixed her marriage with a wealthy man, Basheer (Hamid Wajeeh), whose scam was later exposed to Zaina's father. Hence, he favored Shifaz and Zaina's marriage despite her mother's disapproval. Meanwhile, Mohamed visits Male' hoping to reunite with his long-lost brother and stays with Ruqiyya (Haajara Abdul Kareem) a vile woman who mistreats her visitor.

== Cast ==
- Mohamed Rasheed as Ali Shifaz
- Mariyam Rasheedha as Zaina
- Ahmed Sharumeel as Mohamed
- Haajara Abdul Kareem as Ruqiyya
- Hamid Wajeeh as Basheer
- Fathimath Mohamed Didi as Dhon Didi
- Hassan Mufeed
- Mohamed Saleem
- Nasheedha
- Mohamed Afrah as Mujey
- Zuleykha
- Khadheeja Ahmed
- Shaheedha
- Nizam Abdulla
- Abdulla Rasheed
- Irushad
- Shuaib Ahmed
- Ilhana Rasheed
- Ahmed Shafeeq
- Saeed Ali
- Kamana
- Thoha Badheeu
- Mohamed Ashraf

== Soundtrack ==
Track listing
No.	Title	Lyrics	Singer(s)	Length
1.	"Roalhin Libunu Ufalun"	Kashima Ahmed Shakir	Hussain Rasheed, Sofa Thaufeeq
2.	"Adhu Vaathee Hithaamayaa Veynaa"	Kashima Ahmed Shakir	Hussain Shihab
3.	"Loabivanee Mi Keehvehey"		Jeymu Dhonkamana
4.	"Mulhi Umuraa Hayaathugaa Veynee"	Kashima Ahmed Shakir	Sofa Thaufeeq
5.	"Dhin Mi Veyney"	Kashima Ahmed Shakir	Sofa Thaufeeq

== Reception ==
The film was released on 29 March 1988. Upon release, the film received mainly positive reviews from critics where the performance of Mohamed Rasheed, Mariyam Rasheedha and Haajara Abdul Kareem were praised for playing the role with the required emotions.
