= Umar Zahir =

Maldivian singer

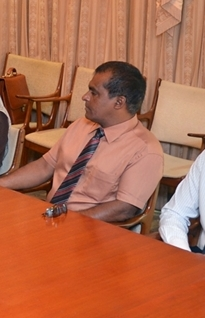
- Zahir in 2014
- Born: 22 November 1963 (age 62); Male', Maldives
- Occupation: Playback singer
- Years active: 1987–present
- Musical career
- Genres: Pop; filmi; electronic
- Instrument: Vocals

Umar Zahir (22 November 1963) is a singer from Male', Maldives.

== Early life and career ==
Zahir began his career as a musician by joining several music bands in performing at resorts and events. It was then his talent was identified by music composers and producers, where he was offered to lend his voice for several of their compositions. His album series Hanhaara became a record-breaking album and its songs including "Erey Haadha Rueemey" and "Mooney Thee Hiyy Edhey" became chartbusters upon release. In an article published by Mihaaru, Ahmed Adhushan wrote: "Apart from his soulful rendition of the songs, his performance becomes an instant attachment to the music lovers, for its emotional and meaningful lyrics".

With the fading demand for studio albums, Zahir slowly become detached from the music releases. In 2014, he served on the National Honours Committee. However, in 2018, he formed a music band titled "Uzy" and made a comeback into the musical scene where he announced that he will frequently collaborate with other singers and more casually perform in resorts and events, similar to his career peak days. This was followed by the television song program, Mooney Thee Hiyy Edhey where several singers including, Fazeela Amir, Rafiyath Rameeza, Shifa Thaufeeq and Sama Moosa. In 2020, Zahir was ranked at the fifth position in the list of "Most Listened Vocalist of 2020" compiled by the music streaming platform, Lavafoshi, marking him as the second playback singer to be featured in the list after Ali Rameez. In February 2021, Zahir announces his retirement and mentioned that he inclines to expand his own business.

== Discography ==
=== Feature film ===
Year	Film	Song	Lyricist(s)	Co-artist(s)	Notes
1987	Ithubaaru	"Dhennevee Ey Dhennevee"		Solo	
1988	Haasil	"Majalaa Libey Mi Ufaa"		Solo	
1988	Chuttee	"Loabi Bunedhenhey"		Sofa Thaufeeq	
1988	Chuttee	"Chuttee Han'dhaan"		Sofa Thaufeeq	
1992	Loabi Veveynee Furaana Dheegen	"Furaana Dheegenney Saafu Loabi Veveynee"		Solo	
1994	Karuna	"E Ufaathakaai Reyvi Dhuvasthah"	Umar Zahir	Solo	
1995	Dhehithehge Loabi	"Ruhi Kuramey Aadhey"	Ahmed Sharumeel	Shifa Thaufeeq	
1995	Dhehithehge Loabi	"Loabi Mooney"	Ahmed Sharumeel	Shifa Thaufeeq	
1995	Dhehithehge Loabi	"Vedhaaneythoa"	Ahmed Sharumeel	Solo	
1995	Dhehithehge Loabi	"Ey Naazuneenaa"	Ahmed Sharumeel	Solo	Appears in Soundtrack album
1995	Biru	"Thee Magey Zeeniyaa"	Kaneeru Abdul Raheem	Solo	
1995	Biru	"Thihireeyey Gaathugaa"	Kaneeru Abdul Raheem	Fathimath Iraadhaa	
1996	Haqqu	"Dhannamuthoa Ey Loabeegaa"		Fathimath Zoona	
1996	Haqqu	"Mooney Thiee Hiyy Edhey"	Mausoom Shakir	Solo	
1996	Haqqu	"Thedhekey Ufaa Dheefaa Nudhey"	Mausoom Shakir	Solo	
1997	Loabeega Aniyaa	"Loabeegaa Vee Aniyaa"	Kaneeru Abdul Raheem	Solo	
1997	Heelaiy	"Aadhey Magey Jaan"	Mariyam Waheedha	Mariyam Waheedha	
1997	Heelaiy	"Kiyaafaa Vedhaaney"	Kaneeru Abdul Raheem	Mariyam Waheedha	
1997	Heelaiy	"Vaanee Ahaa"	Abdul Muhaimin	Fazeela Amir	
1997	Laila	"Ley Gulhuvey Gulhuvaa"	Fathimath Nahula	Solo	Appears in Soundtrack album
1998	Sirru	"Vaaloabi Aalaa"	Ahmed Sharumeel	Shifa Thaufeeq	
1998	Fahuneyvaa	"Dhevilaagan'du Jehi Fithuneemaa"	Easa Shareef	Shifa Thaufeeq	
1998	Kuhveriya	"Dheyshe Loabin Araam"	Ahmed Sharumeel	Solo	
1998	Amaanaaiy	"Oagaaverivey Loabivaa"	Mausoom Shakir	Fathimath Rauf	
1999	Leykokaa	"Mithuraa Feneythoa"		Shifa Thaufeeq	
2000	Ainbehge Loabi Firiehge Vaajib	"Vaareyaa Themi Foaveemaa"	Easa Shareef	Shifa Thaufeeq	
2000	Majubooru Loabi	"Mithuraaey Furusatheh"	Adam Haleem Adnan	Solo	
2000	Majubooru Loabi	"Mithuraaey Furusatheh" (Male Slow Version)	Adam Haleem Adnan	Solo	
2000	Majubooru Loabi	"Neyvaage Therey"	Kopee Mohamed Rasheed	Shifa Thaufeeq	
2000	Rihun	"Astha Thiya Mooney"	Mausoom Shakir	Solo	
2000	Rihun	"Aa Han'dheh Noone Thee Hama Yageen"	Hussain Shihab	Solo	
2000	Rihun	"Ehan'dhaan Iyaadha Kuramey"	Hussain Shihab	Solo	
2000	Rihun	"Aashiqaa Edhemey Ahaa"	Hussain Shihab	Shifa Thaufeeq	
2000	Rihun	"Vaanehe Loabi Vazan"	Hussain Shihab	Shifa Thaufeeq	
2000	Rihun	"Aadheyhey Kuraa Mee Hithun"	Hussain Shihab	Shifa Thaufeeq	
2001	Aaah	"Vaanvee Maruhey"	Adam Haleem Adnan	Solo	
2001	Naaummeedhu	"Oagaavee Hithakun"	Boi Ahmed Khaleel	Fathimath Rauf	
2001	Ranmuiy	"Khiyaalugaa Hunnan"	Abdul Muhaimin	Solo	
2002	Loabi Nuvevununama	"Rovenee Hithaamain Gislaa"	Mausoom Shakir	Fathimath Zoona	
2002	Loabi Nuvevununama	"Thiya Hiyy Adhu Naseebugaa"	Boi Ahmed Khaleel	Fathimath Zoona	
2002	Aan... Aharenves Loabivin	"Hiyy Edhey Varunne"	Kopee Mohamed Rasheedh	Fazeela Amir	
2009	Karuna Vee Beyvafa	"Dheynuhey Loabi Edhey"		Shifa Thaufeeq	
2010	Maafeh Neiy	"Hiyy Furi Loa Meri"	Mohamed Abdul Ghanee	Shifa Thaufeeq	
2011	Zaharu	"Moosumey Mee"	Mohamed Zaheen	Shifa Thaufeeq	
2019	Dhauvath	"Dhekey Hiyy Vaavarun"	Mohamed Zaheen	Solo	
2019	Dhauvath	"Fun Han'dhaanun"	Ibrahim Husaamin	Solo	

=== Television ===
Year	Title	Song	Lyricist(s)	Co-artist(s)
1996	Badhunaamu	"Huvafenehgaa Loabivaa Fenumun"	Fathimath Nahula	Solo
1998	Kulheybeybe	"Hithah Mivaa Varun Aee"	Mausoom Shakir	Solo
1998	Kekulhun (Teledrama)	"Kaaku Dhekeynee Haal"	Moomina Rasheed	Shifa Thaufeeq

=== Non-film songs ===
Year	Album/single	Song	Lyricist(s)	Co-artist(s)
N/A	Single	"Dhinveynuge Hithaamaigaa"	Abdul Hannan Moosa Didi	Solo
N/A	Single	"Nalakoh Reethi Kan'daa Falhu"		Solo
N/A	Single	"Heevaaney Dhoa Maa Farivee Dhoa"		Solo
N/A	Single	"Roalheege Thanmatheegaa"		Solo
N/A	Single	"Karunun Furi Loa Dhaathee"		Solo
N/A	Single	"Maazee Hoadhaa Veythuve Dhiyahaa"		Solo
N/A	Single	"Nan Edhunee Hoadhaalan"		Fathimath Rauf
1988	Sports Aid Telethone	"Haalugaavaa E Nikamethi Kudhin"		Sofa Thaufeeq, Abdul Rasheedh (Absy), Nadhiya Thaufeeq, Mauroof Jameel, Guleylaa
1992	Chance	"Maakuree Veethi Ufaa"		Solo
1993	Single	"Mi Dheebu Kurierun Vanee Ufehdhumun"		Solo
1994	Hanhaara	"Fenigen Thihen Aeemaa"	Mausoom Shakir	Solo
1994	Hanhaara	"Nethey Thiyahvure Edhey Araameh"	Mausoom Shakir	Solo
1994	Hanhaara	"Hiyy Thelhunu Varun"	Mausoom Shakir	Solo
1994	Hanhaara	"Ekaniverikan Vanee"	Mausoom Shakir	Solo
1994	Hanhaara	"Erey Haadha Rueemey"	Mausoom Shakir	Solo
1994	Hanhaara	"Hiyy Edheykan Angadheyshey"	Mausoom Shakir	Solo
1994	Hanhaara	"Astha Thiya Mooney"	Mausoom Shakir	Solo
1994	Hanhaara	"Mooney Thiee Hiyy Edhey"	Mausoom Shakir	Solo
1994	Hanhaara	"Thedhekey Ufaa Dheefaa Nudhey"	Mausoom Shakir	Solo
1994	Hanhaara	"Saafu Hithakun"	Mausoom Shakir	Solo
1994	Hanhaara	"Mi Neyvaagaavi Hoonu Gandhee"	Abdul Rasheed Hussain	Solo
1994	Hanhaara	"Loabeege Mi Aalamugaa"	Ahmed Zaahir	Solo
1994	Loodhifaa	"Loabeegaa Vee Aniyaa"	Kaneeru Abdul Raheem	Solo
1994	Loodhifaa	"Thoathoa Eynaa Ey Libeythoa"	Kaneeru Abdul Raheem	Shifa Thaufeeq
1994	Loodhifaa	"Filamun Nudhaaneythee"	Kaneeru Abdul Raheem	Shifa Thaufeeq
1994	Loodhifaa	"Reyrey Kurevey Mee Araamu"	Easa Shareef	Shifa Thaufeeq
1994	Loodhifaa	"Thihira Gothakun Balaa"	Easa Shareef	Shifa Thaufeeq
1994	Loodhifaa	"Aslu Athugaa Beehilaa"	Easa Shareef	Solo
1995	Gagunas	"Kaainaathey Ekee Anthareesvee"	Kopee Mohamed Rasheed	Solo
1995	Gagunas	"Faalhugaa Dhin Aniyaigaa"	Kopee Mohamed Rasheed	Solo
1995	Gagunas	"Haqeeqee Mi Loabi Bunedhee"	Kopee Mohamed Rasheed	Solo
1995	Hanhaara 2	"Hithah Mivaa Varun Aee"	Mausoom Shakir	Solo
1995	Hanhaara 2	"Feneyey Thi Reethi Hinithun"	Mausoom Shakir	Solo
1995	Hanhaara 2	"Hithugaa Vaa Ufaa Thiya Ey"	Umar Zahir	Solo
1995	Hanhaara 2	"Heeleema Fenifaa Heelee Erey"		Solo
1995	Hanhaara 2	"Isnagaa Loa Hulhuvaaleemey"		Solo
1995	Hanhaara 2	"Thedhekey Balaanulaa Nudheveyney"		Solo
1995	Hanhaara 2	"Eyru Dhin Ithubaaru Dheynanhey"		Solo
1995	Hanhaara 2	"Haadha Ufaleh Veyey Fenuneemaa"		Solo
1995	Hanhaara 2	"Loa Maraalaafa Vee"		Solo
1995	Hanhaara 2	"Alhaanulaa Thi Dhaneeyey"		Solo
1995	Hiyyfahi 2	"Yaaraa Viyey Azum"		Fazeela Amir
1995	Dhanvaru	"Ey Huskuramun Karuna Lolun"		Solo
1995	Dhanvaru	"Edhey Mooney Muhabbathugaa"		Shifa Thaufeeq
1996	Haadhisaa	"Thaqudheerugaa Mihenvee"	Ahmed Sharumeel	Solo
1996	Haadhisaa	"Ey Jaanaa Wafaa"	Ahmed Sharumeel	Solo
1996	Haadhisaa	"Mi Loabi Veemaa Nuveehe Oagaa"	Ahmed Sharumeel	Solo
1996	Haadhisaa	"Dheyshe Loabin Araam"	Ahmed Sharumeel	Solo
1996	Haadhisaa	"Finee Therey Hin'gamundhaa"	Ahmed Sharumeel	Solo
1996	Haadhisaa	"Viyey Jismu Hissaa"	Ahmed Sharumeel	Solo
1996	Haadhisaa	"Edhey Moonakeehey"	Ahmed Sharumeel	Shifa Thaufeeq
1996	Haadhisaa	"Hama Dhenme Kalaa"	Ahmed Haleem	Shifa Thaufeeq
1996	Haadhisaa	"Isthashin Moonu Thi Foruvaaleehey"	Ahmed Haleem	Solo
1996	Maayoos	"Hithugaa Vaahaa Loabi"		Solo
1996	Maayoos	"Libunu Veynaa Mi Udhaahaa"		Solo
1996	Sahaaraa	"Loabivanyaa Kureegaa Bunaashey"	Easa Shareef	Solo
1996	Fiyavalhu	"Huvafenehgaa Loabivaa Fenumun"	Fathimath Nahula	Solo
1996	Misraab	"Keeh Mivanee Keeh Nuvanee"	Ahmed Haleem	Fazeela Amir
1996	Misraab	"Gislaa Rovey Goiy Vee"	Ahmed Haleem	Solo
1996	Misraab	"Nethee Hithaama Thahammal"	Kopee Mohamed Rasheedh	Solo
1996	Misraab	"Edheythee Reethi Moonaa"	Easa Shareef	Solo
1996	Shakuvaa	"Visneyhey Gislaa Rovey"	Ahmed Shakeeb	Solo
1997	Faruwaa	"Aanan Baavaaney"	Kopee Mohamed Rasheedh	Shifa Thaufeeq
1997	Faruwaa	"Dhey Lafuzun Heelaa"	Ahmed Haleem	Shifa Thaufeeq
1997	Haadhisaa 2	"Naazukee Malaae Hiyy"	Ahmed Haleem	Solo
1997	Haadhisaa 2	"Hiyyvaru Nethigen"	Ahmed Haleem	Solo
1997	Haadhisaa 2	"Ahaalan Edhen Mikolhu Balaathoa"	Ahmed Haleem	Solo
1997	Haadhisaa 2	"Vayaa Isthashithah"	Ahmed Haleem	Solo
1997	Haadhisaa 2	"Heenulaathee Eheemey"	Ahmed Haleem	Solo
1997	Haadhisaa 2	"Ey Ninjaa Araamey"	Ahmed Haleem	Solo
1997	Haadhisaa 2	"Dheyshey Furaana"	Ahmed Haleem	Solo
1997	Haadhisaa 2	"Neyngi Hiyy Gellunee"	Ahmed Haleem	Aminath Ibrahim
1997	Haadhisaa 2	"Kollee Hithaahe Samaasaa"	Ahmed Haleem	Shifa Thaufeeq
1997	Haadhisaa 2	"Vaaloabi Aalaa"	Ahmed Sharumeel	Shifa Thaufeeq
1997	Haadhisaa 2	"Thee Khiyaaley Kurevey Loabin"	Ahmed Sharumeel	Solo
1997	Haadhisaa 2	"Ey Dhen Ladhun"	Ahmed Sharumeel	Solo
1997	Kurunees	"Hinithunve Balaalaathoa"		Solo
1997	Kurunees	"Thadhaa Ekivaru Sazaa"	Adam Haleem Adhnan"	Solo
1997	Kurunees	"Noolheyshe Mihaalu Dhuniyeygaa"	Easa Shareef	Solo
1997	Kurunees	"Foosseh Nuvey Balaalumun"	Easa Shareef	Solo
1997	Kurunees	"Heekaruvaathee Hureveyhey Dhoa"	Easa Shareef	Shifa Thaufeeq
1997	Kurunees	"Vaareyaa Themi Foaveemaa"	Easa Shareef	Shifa Thaufeeq
1997	Raahi	"Dhuniye Mi Banave"	Kopee Mohamed Rasheedh	Solo
1997	Raalhu	"Khiyaaru Kuraa Ithubaaru Kuraashey"	Tharaboozu Ahmed Riza	Shifa Thaufeeq
1997	Raalhu	"Nooney Dhoa Chaalu Veemaa"	Tharaboozu Ahmed Riza	Solo
1997	Raalhu	"Khiyaalugaa Vee E Vaudhaa"	Tharaboozu Ahmed Riza	Fazeela Amir
1997	Ranthari	"Bahdhalu Dhen Thoa Aee Vaan"	Sofa Thaufeeq	Sofa Thaufeeq
1997	Sarindhaa	"Meridheyey Loa Rakiveemaa"	Ahmed Sharumeel	Fazeela Amir
1997	Thasveeru	"Beykaaru Mivaa Reyreygaa"		Solo
1997	Thasveeru	"Loa Furey Haalugaa Veynun"		Solo
1997	Thasveeru	"Khiyaal Dhiwaanaa Vaathee Ey"		Solo
1997	Thasveeru	"Angaashe Hiyy Edhey Mi Khabar"		Solo
1997	Thasveeru	"Hoadhae Tharithah"		Shifa Thaufeeq
1997	Single	"Neyngumahvure Vakin Dhera Kameh"	Abdulla Sodhiq	Ali Rameez, Fathimath Zoona, Fazeela Amir, Mohamed Huzam, Abdul Hannan Moosa Didi
1998	Aawaaraa	"Kiyaadheebalaashey"	Shifa Thaufeeq	Shifa Thaufeeq
1998	Aawaaraa	"Visnaanulaa Kuri Inthizaaru"	Boi Ahmed Khaleel	Shifa Thaufeeq
1998	Arutha	"Hiyy Magey Dhoove Ekee"		Solo
1998	Arutha	"Kurehijjeyey Hithu Thereygaa Emaa"		Solo
1998	Arutha	"Hithu Loabi Hithaa Vakivaaneyhey"	Adam Haleem Adhnan	Solo
1998	Arutha	"Vee Beywafaa Eynaa"		Shifa Thaufeeq
1998	Meeraa	"Kuran'gi Dheloa"	Kopee Mohamed Rasheedh	Fazeela Amir
1998	Meeraa	"Keekeyhey Bunaanee Vakiveemaa"	Kopee Mohamed Rasheedh	Solo
1998	Foni Karuna	"Kuran Hithuleemey Loabin Thikan"		Shifa Thaufeeq
1998	Hungaanu	"Hekivaaneyey Mi Han'dhuvaru"		Solo
1998	Kuran'gi	"Shaamil Veemaa Yaaraa"	Ahmed Sharumeel	Sofa Thaufeeq
1998	Kuran'gi	"Ladhun Thiya Moonu Foruvee Dhoa"		Solo
1998	Kurikeela	"Hithuge Veynee Adey Mee"	Kopee Mohamed Rasheedh	Solo
1998	Kurikeela	"Thedhu Khiyaalu Kalaa"	Kopee Mohamed Rasheedh	Fazeela Amir
1998	Randhoadhi	"Nunidhey Mihiyy Thelhey Varun"	Easa Shareef	Shifa Thaufeeq
1998	Randhoadhi	"Ey Aadhey Nudhaashey"	Easa Shareef	Solo
1998	Randhoadhi	"Loabeege Nishaanthakey"		Solo
1998	Redhan	"Falaku Netheehey"	Kopee Mohamed Rasheedh	Solo
1998	Redhan	"Vaaney Kaireegaa"	Kopee Mohamed Rasheedh	Shifa Thaufeeq
1998	Redhan	"Fini Reyge Fathihey"	Kopee Mohamed Rasheedh	Shifa Thaufeeq
1998	Thaureef	"Oagaave Bunedheyshey"	Boi Ahmed Khaleel	Solo
1998	Thaureef	"Roalhi Vai Jehenyaa"	Boi Ahmed Khaleel	Solo
1999	Adhaarasam	"Kuraathee Dhen Asaru"		Fazeela Amir
1999	Adhaarasam	"Haama Nukureveythee Ey"		Solo
1999	Dhirun	"Neyvaage Therey"		Shifa Thaufeeq
1999	Dhirun	"Loabiveemaa Kihineh Vaanee"		Shifa Thaufeeq
1999	Dhirun	"Madumadun Hiyy Bunaathee"	Easa Shareef	Shifa Thaufeeq
1999	Dhirun	"Moonugaa Loabin Mi Firumaa"		Fazeela Amir
1999	Dhirun	"Ey Chaalu Ey Naazukee"		Solo
1999	Dhirun	"Loabin Heelaa Heelaadhee"		Solo
1999	Ithaa	"Mihin'dhu Viye Dheewaanaa"		Shifa Thaufeeq
1999	Giritee	"Fenilumashey Mi Edhevey"		Solo
1999	Kasthoori	"Hizaajuvaa Haalugaa"		Solo
1999	Mahinooru	"Badhal Zamaan Viye Loabeegaa"	Kopee Mohamed Rasheedh	Solo
1999	Mahinooru	"Nidheyneyhey Ekaniveemaa"	Kopee Mohamed Rasheedh	Shifa Thaufeeq
1999	Malakaa	"Ey Naazukee Fari Malakaa"		Solo
1999	Malakaa	"Mithuraa Feneythoa Hureemey"		Shifa Thaufeeq
1999	Muniyaa	"Fun Loabi Dheyshey"		Shifa Thaufeeq
1999	Raaya	"Hithaa Ey, I Love You"		Shifa Thaufeeq
1999	Raaya	"Hiyy Mi Dhinee Loabinney"		Solo
1999	Rukkuri	"Haadhahaa Reethi Mooneh"	Boi Ahmed Khaleel	Solo
1999	Singaa	"Chaalu Yaaraa Dhen"		Solo
1999	Singaa	"Khiyaalu Hithugaa Hin'gaa"		Solo
2000	Single	"Aadha Ey Mee Dhuniyeygaa"		Solo
2000	Bolirava	"Ekee Reyrey Nuvaananhey"		Aasima
2000	Bulbul	"Oh Nadhaa"	Adam Haleem Adhnan	Solo
2000	Bulbul	"Maathahves Chaaluvee"		Solo
2000	Dhoapattaa	"Ran Fazaaehgaa Balaashey"		Aminath Ibrahim
2000	Dhoapattaa	"Leynaarugaa Hin'gaa"		Solo
2000	Esfiya	"Theeyey Mi Meyge Vindhakee"	Boi Ahmed Khaleel	Solo
2000	Gumree	"Kehidhee Uvaalee"	Ahmed Haleem	Solo
2000	Hanhaara 3	"Hiyy Roathee Keiynuvey"	Adam Haleem Adhnan	Solo
2000	Hanhaara 3	"Hinithun Vaashey Finikan Dheyshey"	Adam Haleem Adhnan	Solo
2000	Hanhaara 3	"Karuna Ohey Lolun"	Adam Haleem Adhnan	Solo
2000	Hanhaara 3	"Ali Moonaa Ey Dhillaalaa"	Adam Haleem Adhnan	Solo
2000	Hanhaara 3	"Aahugaa Mifuraana Dhaavaru"	Adam Haleem Adhnan	Solo
2000	Hanhaara 3	"Mendhan Veemaa Himeyn"	Adam Haleem Adhnan	Solo
2000	Hanhaara 3	"Pareehooru Huvafen Thakugaavaa"	Adam Haleem Adhnan	Solo
2000	Hanhaara 3	"Sazaa Nudheyshey Aashiqaa Ey"	Adam Haleem Adhnan	Solo
2000	Hanhaara 3	"Mibunee Loabiveyey"	Adam Haleem Adhnan	Solo
2000	Hanhaara 3	"Hiyy Adhu Vanee Hadhiyaa Ey"	Adam Haleem Adhnan	Solo
2000	Hanhaara 3	"Ummeedhu Kuramun Ai Rey"	Abdulla Sodhiq	Solo
2000	Hanhaara 3	"Eynaa Aumun Ivenee"	Ahmed Haleem	Solo
2000	Hiyala	"Vairoalhin Dhey Dhauvathugaa"		Shifa Thaufeeq
2000	Inthihaa	"Bunaashey Loabivey"		Fazeela Amir
2000	Inthihaa	"Abadhah Vakivaan"		Solo
2000	Kathiriyaa	"Mee Libey Veynekey"		Solo
2000	Khareef	"Vaanvee Maruhey Vaa Aahun"	Adam Haleem Adhnan	Solo
2000	Maaburu	"Suvaalu Kuramey Javaabu Edhemey"	Adam Haleem Adhnan	Solo
2000	Moosum	"Mithuraa Ey Furusatheh"	Adam Haleem Adhnan	Solo
2000	Moosum	"Mithuraa Ey Furusatheh" (Slow Version)	Adam Haleem Adhnan	Shifa Thaufeeq
2000	Mujuraa	"Kairivelee Thiya Loaiybah Edheythee"	Adam Haleem Adhnan	Shifa Thaufeeq
2000	Mujuraa	"Nagaaleethee Wafaatherikan"		Solo
2000	Muraka	"Adhu Hithugaa Aavee Rihumey"		Solo
2000	Namaves	"Chaandhaneemaa Folhey"		Solo
2000	Neyvaa	"Heeviyey Dheloley E'ee"	Kopee Mohamed Rasheedh	Solo
2000	Nihaa	"Party Thereyn"		Solo
2000	Sahaaraa 2	"Kalaage Reethi Hinithun"	Easa Shareef	Solo
2000	Single	"Hiyythakuge Maamelaameli"	Maumoon Abdul Gayoom	Solo
2000	Single	"Ufaleh Kamah Dhekemey Balaalun"		Solo
2000	Single	"Mee Kiyaa Raagakee"	Fenthashi Mohamed Khaleel	Solo
2000	Single	"Dhevvaa Nikamethi Hithakah"		Solo
2001	Baaodi	"Baaodi"		Solo
2001	Baaodi	"Masthee Mooney Thiyaee"		Solo
2001	Boduraalhu	"Ufaavey Fenuneemaa"	Coco Hassan Haleem	Aishath Inaya
2001	Mendhan	"Hairaan Adhu Vaathee"		Solo
2001	Muthee	"O Reyrey Vey Shoakh"		Solo
2001	Muthee	"Fevuney Magey Meygaa"	Adam Haleem Adhnan	Solo
2001	Randhi	"Dhirumaai Tharaqqee Kan'duroajjaa"	Ahmed Hafeez	Ali Abdul Kareem
2001	Randhi	"Masverikamey Qaumiyyathaa Vakinukureveyney"	Aboobakuru Adam	Solo
2001	Reyfanaa	"Loabeege Shakuvaa"	Hassan Shakir Mohamed	Aishath Shahudha
2001	Rukkuri 3	"Loabeege Moosun Dhaneeyey"	Easa Shareef	Solo
2001	Rukkuri 3	"Loa Maraalaashey Mihaaru"		Solo
2001	Shoakh	"Gennan Abadhume Reyrey"	Ismail Abdul Qadhir	Aishath Inaya
2001	Tharaanaa	"Vaudhekey Bunan En'gey"	Hafsa Ali	Shifa Thaufeeq
2001	Tharaanaa	"Thari Han'dhu Faalhugaa"	Adam Naseer Ibrahim	Solo
2001	Single	"Kudakudhinge Ufaa"		Mohamed Zaidh, Mohamed Suhail
2002	Single	"Haalu Ahaalee Loabivaathee Ey"	Easa Shareef	Fathimath Zoona
2002	Fari Raanee	"Thaqudheerugaa Mihenvee"	Ahmed Sharumeel	Solo
2002	Faiymini	"Han'dhakee Kalaa Kamugaa Viyas"	Haamidh	Solo
2002	Faiymini	"Han'dhu Huree Naaran Vegen"	Adam Naseer Ibrahim	Solo
2002	Faiymini	"E Ufaathakaai Reyvi Edhuvasthah"	Umar Zahir	Solo
2002	Faiymini	"Ey Kobaa Iyye Dhin Hadhiyaa"		Solo
2002	Faiymini	"Thiyahen Nudhaashey Yaaraa"		Solo
2002	Faiymini	"Eyrun Dhinhaa Foni Ufaathah"		Solo
2002	Faiymini	"Heylheegaa Kuran'gi Lolun"		Solo
2002	Faiymini	"Eree Dhen E Han'dhuvaru"		Solo
2002	Faiymini	"Hithaa Kulhelaifi Jaan"		Solo
2002	Faiymini	"Han'dhaanthah Vee Hithugaa"		Solo
2002	Faiymini	"Pardes Jaane Wale"		Solo
2002	Faiymini	"Hamein Aur Jaane Jaan"		Solo
2002	Guraha	"Hiyy Edhey Varunne Nuhure"	Kopee Mohamed Rasheedh	Fazeela Amir
2002	Guraha	"Dhaathee Dheloa Numaraashey"		Shifa Thaufeeq
2002	Guraha	"Hithugaavi Ishqu Heyli Miee"	Adam Haleem Adhnan	Shifa Thaufeeq
2002	Kashfu	"Dheynuhe Loabi Edhey"		Shifa Thaufeeq
2002	Kashfu	"Loabivaa Mithuru"		
2002	Leykokaa	"Adhu Hithugaa Aavee Rihumey"		Solo
2002	Lily	"Loabi Loabin Nikan"	Ismail Mubarik	Solo
2002	Lily	"Maanavee Thiya Nazaru"		Solo
2002	Samaasa	"Heelaa Nuroi Heelaa"	Abdulla Muaz Yoosuf	Shifa Thaufeeq
2003	Haadhisaa 3	"Vaanehey Manzil Mithaa"		Solo
2003	Haadhisaa 3	"Loabeegaa Dhookollaa Theereh"		Solo
2003	Haadhisaa 3	"Naseebugaa Magey"		Solo
2003	Haadhisaa 3	"Dhin Han'dhaanaa Khiyaalu Aavee"		Solo
2003	Haadhisaa 3	"Mirey Fenifa Dhaathee"		Solo
2003	Haadhisaa 3	"Foni Foni Loabi Dhey"		Solo
2003	Haadhisaa 3	"Araamu Gelley Khiyaaleh"		Solo
2003	Haadhisaa 3	"Dream Girl"		Solo
2003	Haadhisaa 3	"Haadha Amaan Thanekey"		Shifa Thaufeeq
2003	Huvafenun Dhusheemey	"Dhin Han'dhaanaa Khiyaalu Aavee"		Solo
2003	Huvafenun Dhusheemey	"Gendhaashey Jaan"		Solo
2003	Huvafenun Dhusheemey	"Huvafenugaa Reyrey"		Solo
2003	Huvafenun Dhusheemey	"Loabeegaa Dhookollaa Theereh"		Solo
2003	Huvafenun Dhusheemey	"Mihen Hama Kurin Loabi Vevifaa"		Solo
2003	Huvafenun Dhusheemey	"Naseebugaa Magey"		Solo
2003	Huvafenun Dhusheemey	"Sirrey Miee Hithugaa"		Fathimath Zoona
2003	Maana	"Nufeni Ihusaas Nukureveyney"		Solo
2003	Rosemarry	"Aadhey Magey Hiyy"		Solo
2004	Single	"Minivan Dhuvas"		Hussain Ali
2004	Mariyaadhu	"Dream Girl"		Solo
2004	Zamaan	"Loabi Aishaa Hinithunvelaa"	Boi Ahmed Khaleel	Solo
2004	Zamaan	"Vaudhaa Huvaakoh Buneemey"	Boi Ahmed Khaleel	Fazeela Amir
2004	Ehan'dhaanugai...	"Adhu Loabeegaa Dhakkaalaa"	Easa Shareef	Solo
2005	Bingaa	"Hithun Hithah Fonuvaa Sitee"		Solo
2005	Vakivi Hin'dhu	"Oh Nadhaa" (Remix Version)	Adam Haleem Adhnan	Solo
2005	Ehan'dhaanugai...	"Orchid Malakaa"		Solo
2006	Mihan'dhaanugai	"Mihiyy Rovvaafaa Thiya Dhanee"	Umar Zahir	Solo
2007	Single	"Foari Dheyshe Fori Dhee"	Hamdhoon Hameedh	Shifa Thaufeeq, Ali Abdul Kareem, Mohamed Suhail, Begonia Shareef
2008	Single	"Dhivehi Dharin Kulhivarugaa"		Ibrahim Zaid Ali, Mohamed Abdul Ghanee
2009	Hiyy Dheebalaa 2	"Kehidhee Uvaalee"	Ahmed Haleem	Solo
2010	VTV Music Awards 2010	"Mee Chaalu Raajjeyey"		Ali Abdul Kareem
2010	Vasmeeru	"Masthee Mooney Thiyaee"		Solo
2012	Hithuge Enme Funminun: S01	"Ey Insaanaa Ey"	Mohamed Abdul Ghanee	Solo
2012	Hithuge Enme Funminun: S01	"Thiya Lobuvethi Dharin"	Mohamed Abdul Ghanee	Lahufa Faiz
2015	Ehan'dhaanugai Starz	"Han'dhakee Kalaa Kamugaa Viyas"	Haamidh	Shifa Thaufeeq
2018	Mooney Thiee Hiyy Edhey	"Ajeeb Daastan Hai Yeh" (Unplugged Version)	Shailendra	Shifa Thaufeeq
2018	Mooney Thiee Hiyy Edhey	"Moosumey Mee" (Unplugged Version)	Mohamed Zaheen	Shifa Thaufeeq
2018	Mooney Thiee Hiyy Edhey	"Samaasaa Samaasaa Thakun" (Unplugged Version)	Easa Shareef	Shifa Thaufeeq
2018	Mooney Thiee Hiyy Edhey	"Oagaaverivey Loabivaa" (Unplugged Version)	Mausoom Shakir	Shifa Thaufeeq
2018	Mooney Thiee Hiyy Edhey	"Mooney Thiee Hiyy Edhey" (Unplugged Version)	Mausoom Shakir	Shifa Thaufeeq
2018	Mooney Thiee Hiyy Edhey	"Mihiyy Rovvaafaa Thiya Dhanee" (Unplugged Version)	Umar Zahir	Solo
2018	Mooney Thiee Hiyy Edhey	"And I Love Her" (Unplugged Version)		Solo
2018	Mooney Thiee Hiyy Edhey	"Vaathee Ma Kaireegaa" (Unplugged Version)	Fathimath Nahula	Fazeela Amir
2018	Mooney Thiee Hiyy Edhey	"Bahaarekey Ai Mi Moosun" (Unplugged Version)		Fazeela Amir
2018	Mooney Thiee Hiyy Edhey	"Dhaneehe Aisbalaa" (Unplugged Version)	Abdulla Afeef	Fazeela Amir
2018	Mooney Thiee Hiyy Edhey	"Mulhi Zindhagee Hithaamain" (Unplugged Version)		Fazeela Amir
2018	Mooney Thiee Hiyy Edhey	"Dhin Han'dhaanee Masthee Reyreygaa" (Unplugged Version)		Fazeela Amir
2018	Mooney Thiee Hiyy Edhey	"Mooney Thiee Hiyy Edhey" (Unplugged Version)	Mausoom Shakir	Fazeela Amir
2018	Mooney Thiee Hiyy Edhey	"Hiyy Nurovvaa" (Unplugged Version)	Ahmed Shakeeb	Rafiyath Rameeza
2018	Mooney Thiee Hiyy Edhey	"Ummeedhu Kuramun Ai Rey" (Unplugged Version)	Abdulla Sodhiq	Rafiyath Rameeza
2018	Mooney Thiee Hiyy Edhey	"Loabeege Mi Aalamugaa" (Unplugged Version)	Ahmed Zaahir	Rafiyath Rameeza
2018	Mooney Thiee Hiyy Edhey	"Yeh Raatein Yeh Mausam" (Unplugged Version)	Shailendra	Rafiyath Rameeza
2018	Mooney Thiee Hiyy Edhey	"Mooney Thiee Hiyy Edhey" (Unplugged Version)	Mausoom Shakir	Rafiyath Rameeza
2018	Mooney Thiee Hiyy Edhey	"Wonderful Tonight" (Unplugged Version)		Solo
2018	Mooney Thiee Hiyy Edhey	"Han'dhahvure Farikan Libifaavaa" (Unplugged Version)		Solo
2018	Mooney Thiee Hiyy Edhey	"Main Phir Bhi Tumko Chaahunga" (Unplugged Version)		Samaha Moosa
2018	Mooney Thiee Hiyy Edhey	"Ekaniverikan Vanee" (Unplugged Version)	Mausoom Shakir	Samaha Moosa
2018	Mooney Thiee Hiyy Edhey	"Mooney Thiee Hiyy Edhey" (Unplugged Version)	Mausoom Shakir	Samaha Moosa
2018	Mooney Thiee Hiyy Edhey	"Dhey Han'dhaanakee" (Unplugged Version)	Kaneeru Abdul Raheem	Samaha Moosa
2018	Mooney Thiee Hiyy Edhey	"Oagaavee Hithakun" (Unplugged Version)	Boi Ahmed Khaleel	Samaha Moosa
2019	Thahuniyaa	"Dhannavaa Adhabu"		Solo
2020	Single	"Ihaalee Mibin" (Cover Version)	Abdul Rasheedh Hussain	Various Artists
2025	Loabeege Aalam	"Loabeege Mi Aalamugaa"	Ahmed Zaahir	Solo
2025	Loabeege Aalam	"Khiyaalugaa Hunnan"	Abdul Muhaimin	Solo
2025	Loabeege Aalam	"Fenigen Thihen Aeemaa"	Mausoom Shakir	Solo
2025	Loabeege Aalam	"Mihiyy Rovvaafaa Thiya Dhanee"	Umar Zahir	Solo
2025	Loabeege Aalam	"Ekaniverikan Vanee"	Mausoom Shakir	Solo
2025	Loabeege Aalam	"Roalhi Vai Jehenyaa"	Boi Ahmed Khaleel	Solo
2025	Loabeege Aalam	"Mendhan Veemaa Himeyn"	Adam Haleem Adhnan	Solo
2025	Loabeege Aalam	"Thadhaa Ekivaru Sazaa"	Adam Haleem Adhnan	Solo
2025	Loabeege Aalam	"Han'dhakee Kalaa Kamugaa Viyas"	Haamidh	Solo
2025	Loabeege Aalam	"Hiyy Roathee Keiynuvey"	Adam Haleem Adhnan	Solo
2025	Loabeege Aalam	"Hithah Mivaa Varun Aee"	Mausoom Shakir	Solo
2025	Loabeege Aalam	"Dheynuhey Gengos Vayaa Ey"		Solo
2025	Loabeege Aalam	"Mi Neyvaagaavi Hoonu Gandhee"	Abdul Rasheedh Hussain	Solo
2025	Loabeege Aalam	"Hiyy Thelhunu Varun"	Mausoom Shakir	Solo
2025	Loabeege Aalam	"Chaalu Yaaraa Dhen"		Solo
2025	Loabeege Aalam	"Masthee Mooney Thiyaee"		Solo

== Accolades ==
Year	Award	Category	Nominated work	Result	Ref(s)
1995	National Award of Recognition	Performing Arts - Singing		Won	
1995	1st Gaumee Film Awards	Best Melody	"E Ufaathakaa" - Karuna	Won	
1997	2nd Gaumee Film Awards	Best Male Playback Singer	"Mooney Thiee Hiyy Edhey" - Haqqu	Won	
