= Orchid – Eynaage Maa =

- Written by: Hussain Shihab
- Screenplay by: Hussain Shihab
- Directed by: Hussain Shihab
- Starring: Mohamed Rasheed; Nahidha Ali; Aminath Waheedha
- Country of origin: Maldives
- Original language: Dhivehi

Production
- Producer: Television Maldives
- Cinematography: Ali Waheed
- Editor: Mohamed Nazeer
- Running time: 70 minutes

Original release
- Release: 1982

Orchid – Eynaage Maa (transl. Orchid – Her Flower) is a 1982 Maldivian television film written and directed by Hussain Shihab. Produced by Television Maldives, the film stars Mohamed Rasheed, Nahidha Ali and Aminath Waheedha in pivotal roles. The film centers around a medically unfit young woman who, despite facing a manipulative suitor, embarks on a romantic relationship with a stage performer and vocalist. The narrative unfolds tragically as their relationship coincides with her untimely death.

== Premise ==
Nuzuhath returns from Sri Lanka and while on her way to home, accidentally splashes mud on Nisham, who is a vocalist of the renowned music band Progman, whom she initially did not recognize. In an attempt to apologize, she offers him a ride to the music show. Ibrahimfulhu, a close friend of Nuzuhath's father, proposes a marriage between Nuzhath and his son, Adamfulhu. Aisa Manike, Nuzuhath's mother, expresses skepticism about the proposal due to Waheed, Nuzuhath's brother, opposing early marriage and Nuzuhath having a medical condition. As expected, Waheed disapproves of the proposal, denouncing Adamfulhu as a womanizer. Ibrahimfulhu manipulates Adamfulhu to abandon his current girlfriend and pursue Nuzuhath, driven by their wealth.

Nuzuhath and Nisham meet again on another island, scheduling a meeting for the following day. Their meeting at the beach leads to Nisham sharing how Nuzuhath became a fan of his voice, and a romantic relationship begins to blossom. Envious Ibrahimfulhu reintroduces the marriage proposal, which Waheed rejects. Ibrahimwfulhu leaves forewarning the family of impending downfall. Waheed supports Nuzuhath's relationship with Nisham, and she joyfully shares the news. Shortly after, Nuzuhath travels to Lanka for a medical checkup, revealing a diagnosis of a brain tumor. Aisa Manike communicates Nuzuhath's passing in a letter to Nisham, revealing that she succumbed to the tumor a day after the diagnosis, shattering Nisham's heart.

== Cast ==
- Mohamed Rasheed as Nisham
- Nahidha Ali as Nuzuhath
- Aminath Waheedha as Anju
- Abdul Raheeem as Waheed
- Aneesa as Aisa Manike
- Abdulla Sameem as Ibrahimfulhu
- Mohamed as Adamfulhu
- Mohamed Shameem as Shameem
- Mohamed Manik as Manik
- Mariyam Haajara as Aansaa

== Soundtrack ==
Track listing
No.	Title	Singer(s)	Length
1.	"Reyrey Dhiwaanaa"	Ibrahim Hamdhee, Fathimath Rauf	4:38
2.	"Angaa Dheyshey Adhu Vee Ruhigen"	Ibrahim Shakeeb	4:13

== Release and reception ==
The film was released in 1982, during the early period of Maldivian cinema establishments. The film received a positive response from critics and was a commercial success. Critics and the audience considered the film to be a "pathbreaking" film in the local industry. The film's soundtrack, featuring "Reyrey Dhiwaana" and "Angaa Dheyshey Adhu Vee Ruhigen" became huge chartbusters, further contributing to its acclaim. Even decades after its release, the enduring popularity of the songs is evident through multiple remakes and acoustic versions, resonating with later generations.

== Remake ==
In July 2019, Dharaa Production unveiled a poster for a film, hinting at the possibility of a remake of Orchid – Eynaage Maa. Subsequently, it was disclosed that the film would indeed be remade, utilizing the original script as a foundation but infused with a modern flair and a fresh cast. According to reports, Fathimath Leena will develop the script for this semi-musical remake, and Mohamed Rasheed, the actor from the original film, will direct it.
