= Ithubaaru =

- Official film poster
- Directed by: Hussain Shihab; Hassan Najumee
- Written by: Samiya Ahmed
- Screenplay by: Hussain Shihab
- Starring: Mohamed Rasheed; Mariyam Rasheedha; Ahmed Sharmeel; Haajara Abdul Kareem
- Cinematography: Hassan Maumoon
- Edited by: Mohamed Shameem
- Music by: Dudlee, DIB
- Release date: March 29, 1987
- Country: Maldives
- Language: Dhivehi

Ithubaaru is a 1987 Maldivian drama film directed by Hussain Shihab and Hassan Najumee. The film stars Mohamed Rasheed, Mariyam Rasheedha, Ahmed Sharmeel and Haajara Abdul Kareem in pivotal roles. The film was released on 29 March 1987.

== Premise ==
Latheefa (Mariyam Rasheedha) who was studying in Male' is forcibly brought into her step-mother's house after her father's dismissal. Since then, Latheefa is continuously abused and traumatized by her step-mother, Khadheeja (Haajara Abdul Kareem) and step-sister, depriving her from education and restricting her from attending social gatherings.

== Cast ==
- Mohamed Rasheed as Riyaz
- Mariyam Rasheedha as Latheefa
- Haajara Abdul Kareem as Khadheeja
- Ahmed Sharmeel as Atheef
- Khadheeja
- Khadheeja Ahmed
- Shaugee Abdulla
- Junaid Saud
- Rafeeq
- Afrah
- Hussain Rasheed
- Hamid

== Soundtrack ==
Track listing
No.	Title	Lyrics	Singer(s)	Length
1.	"Magey Loa Karunun Baruvee"		Sofa Thaufeeq
2.	"Dhanna Amaanaiytherin"		Sofa Thaufeeq
3.	"Ey Zamaana"	Yoosuf Mohamedfulhu	Sofa Thaufeeq
4.	"Dhennevee Ey Dhennevee"		Umar Zahir
