= Haajara Abdul Kareem =

Maldivian actress, writer, director and producer

Haajara Abdul Kareem was a Maldivian actress, writer, director and producer mostly known for her villainous and comical roles in feature films.

== Career ==
Haajara played the role of Jameela, a poor woman who struggles in a second marriage, in Ahmed Sharmeel and Ibrahim Waheed's family drama film Dhon Manma (1992) alongside Ibrahim Shakir and Sharmeel. The film tells the story of a step-mother who strives to create a bond with her step-children. Also, she starred opposite Reeko Moosa Manik, Hassan Afeef, Niuma Mohamed and Mariyam Nazima in the Easa Shareef directed Emme Fahu Dhuvas (2000) which follows a devious woman who sunders her best-friend's upcoming marriage by creating false accusations and staging misleading impressions.

Hamid Ali's Badhal was released in 1996, in which she starred alongside Ali, Niuma Mohamed, Hussain Sobah and Waleedha Waleed which follows a series of events caused by the misunderstanding by a "non-existent" twin. She also played the ruthless step-mother who abuses and traumatizes her step-daughter which garnered her critical acclaim for the performance. The dialogues she used in the film were considered to be the "most iconic dialogues" in the history of Maldivian cinema.

In 2000, Kareem played the role of Ruqiyya, a gluttonous woman and a local medicine practitioner who forced her step-daughter to marry a wealthy old businessman in Abdul Faththaah's television drama series Dhoapatta. Starring alongside Mohamed Shavin, Jamsheedha Ahmed, Niuma Mohamed and Sheela Najeeb, the series centers on unrequited love and complications of a relationship within and beyond marriage. The same year, she wrote and directed a family drama, Ajaaib besides starring in it alongside Ahmed Asim, Mariyam Nazima, Koyya Hassan Manik and Waleedha Waleed which depicts the relationship of two exemplary wives and their respective families regardless of societal norms. In the film, she played dual roles of two siblings, an aged woman, Aisa Manike who let her only daughter weds a married man and a ruthless mother who tried to spoil the correspondence of two wives. The same year, she starred in another Amjad Ibrahim's direction, a comedy drama film, Majubooru Loabi (2000) opposite Mariyam Nisha and Yoosuf Shafeeu which focuses on a failing marriage of a comprehensive man and an emotionally immature woman.

In 2003, the Abdul Faththaah directed Aan... Aharenves Loabivin (2002) was released in which Kareem starred alongside Ali Seezan, Niuma Mohamed, Sheela Najeeb, Aminath Rasheedha and Neena Saleem where she played the mother of Suzy, an ill-fated girl who was forced to hide her marriage in-order to help her friend recovering from amnesia. Upon release, the film opened to positive response from critics and was a commercially successful project.

Her last film release was the Abdul Faththaah-directed critically acclaimed television series, Thiyey Mihithuge Vindhakee (2003) which was considered as one of the best series production in television industry. She was applauded for her performance as the villainous mother who is ready to take extreme measures to break her son's relationship with a girl from a middle-class family.

== Death ==
On 13 June 2007, Kareem was pronounced dead at the age of 69. Her funeral prayer was performed at Aasahara Mosque.

== Filmography ==
=== Film ===
Year	Title	Role	Notes	Ref(s)
—N/a	Kuhhee	Abidha		
1984	Youssef and Zeinab	Zainab's mother	Egyptian film	
1987	Ithubaaru	Khadheeja		
1988	Ley Karuna	Ruqiyya		
1992	Dhon Manma	Jameela	Also the writer	
1992	Loabi Veveynee Furaana Dheegen	Dhon Kamana		
1993	Beyvafaa	Dhon Aisa		
1993	Vari	Sara	Also the writer and co-director	
1993	Mithuru		Also the director	
1996	Lheedharifulhu	Dhon Didi		
1996	Badhal	Herself		
1999	Viraashaa	Virasha's mother		
1999	Kaiveneege Furathama Rey	Haajara		
2000	Ajaaib	Aisa Manike / Mareena's mother	Also the director and writer	
2000	Majubooru Loabi	Sheetha		
2000	Emme Fahu Dhuvas	Azeeza's mother		
2001	Dhumah Eri Thari	Dhon Kaiydha		
2002	Aan... Aharenves Loabivin	Suzy's mother		

=== Television ===
Year	Title	Role	Notes	Ref(s)
—N/a	Huvani			
2000	Maafkuraashey	Haajaraa	Guest role; "Episode 8"	
2000	Dhoapatta	Ruqiyya	Recurring role; 3 episodes	
2002	Fahu Fiyavalhu	Sihthi Dhaleyka	Recurring role; 5 episodes	
2003	Thiyey Mihithuge Vindhakee	Zainab	Recurring role; 5 episodes	

== Accolades ==
Year	Award	Category	Nominated work	Result	Ref(s)
1995	1st Gaumee Film Awards	Jury's Award	Dhon Manma	Won	
