= List of Maldivian films of 1993 =

This is a list of Maldivian films released in 1993.

== Releases ==
=== Feature film ===
Opening		Title	Director	Studio	Cast
JAN	01	Beyvafaa	Ibrahim Rasheed	Farivaa Films	Hussain Ali, Reeko Moosa Manik, Waleedha Waleed, Ahmed Riyaz
OCT	01	Vari	Haajara Abdul Kareem; Ahmed Sharmeel	Farivaa Films	Ahmed Sharmeel, Aishath Zaheena, Hamid Ali, Mariyam Haajara, Haajara Abdul Kareem
NA		Hadhiyaa	Hussain Shihab; Ibrahim Waheed	Television Maldives	Fathimath Rameeza, Ibrahim Rasheed, Ahmed Sharumeel, Mariyam Waheedha
NA		Gudhurathuge Niyaa	Fazeen Ahmed; Hassan Haleem	Television Maldives	Fazeen Ahmed, Shaila Fazeen, Ahmed Sharumeel, Zahwan Zaid, Aminath Didi
NA		Imthihaan	M.M. Hussain	Academy of Amateur Acting	Reeko Moosa Manik, Mariyam Manike, Ali Shakir, Ahmed Khalid, Suneetha
NA		Ihsaas	Mohamed Hilmy; Ali Waheed	Mapa Films	Ismail Wajeeh, Reeko Moosa Manik, Hamid Wajeeh, Aminath Shiyaza, Ameena, Yadhiya Hilmy
NA		Mithuru	Haajara Abdul Kareem		Mohamed Aboobakuru, Aishath Zaheena, Hamid Ali, Aminath Rasheedha, Sithi Fulhu
NA		Sitee	Ahmed Nimal	Slam Studio	Ahmed Nimal, Fathimath Rameeza, Arifa Ibrahim, Chilhiya Moosa Manik
NA		Thuhumathu	Hussain Rameez	Mapa, Television Maldives	Asad Shareef, Waleedha Waleed, Reeko Moosa Manik, Aishath Shiranee
NA		Udhaas	Ahmed Nimal	Ocean Films	Mohamed Rasheed, Fathimath Rameeza, Waleedha Waleed, Abdul Raheem, Aminath Ahmed Didi, Sithi Fulhu, Ahmed Nimal
NA		Vaudhu	Yoosuf Rafeeu	Bukhari Films	Yoosuf Rafeeu, Mariyam Shakeela, Abdul Raheem Rashad, Arifa Ibrahim

=== Television ===
This is a list of Maldivian series, in which the first episode was aired or streamed in 1993.

Opening		Title	Director(s)	Cast	Notes
FEB	24	Floak The International		Zaahir; Ashraf Abdul Raheem	3 Episodes
NA		Dhanmalhi	Reeko Moosa Manik	Reeko Moosa Manik, Lilian Saeed, Suneetha, Koyya Hassan Manik, Arifa Ibrahim, Ibrahim Shakir	Teledrama
NA		Dhen Keehkuraanee?		Aishath Shiranee, Ali Shiyam, Ibrahim Shakir	Teledrama
NA		Gundolhi	Easa Shareef	Aishath Shiranee, Reeko Moosa Manik, Mariyam Manike, Koyya Hassan Manik, Ali Shiyam	Teledrama
NA		Haalathu	Mohamed Rasheed; Ali Shiyam	Aishath Shiranee, Ali Shiyam, Ibrahim Shakir, Arifa Ibrahim, Ismail Zahir	Teledrama
NA		Zaizafoona		Koyya Hassan Manik, Mariyam, Waleedha Waleed	Teledrama

== See also ==
- Lists of Maldivian films
