= Television in the Maldives =

Television was introduced in the Maldives on March 29, 1978, being picked up by an audience of 90 television sets in Male, the national capital. Until 2008, the Maldives only had Television Maldives as its national broadcaster.

Future TV, the first private television channel, launched on June 6, 2008, followed by DhiTV on July 1 and VTV on September 5. The introduction of private television came after restrictions on independent media in the country were lifted.

== Channels ==
Name	Owner	Launched	Information	Reference(s)
TVM	PSM	29 March 1978	Oldest TV channel in the Maldives.	
Maldives TV	PSM	2006	International channel with strong emphasis on tourism.	
YES	PSM	8 March 2016	Youth channel.	
Munnaaru TV	PSM	29 December 2016	Islamic channel.	
PSM News	PSM	3 May 2017	News channel.	
TVM Qur'an	PSM	29 March 2023	Quranic channel.	
VTV	VMEDIA	5 September 2008	Current affairs channel.	
Raajje TV	Raajje Television Pvt Ltd	15 December 2010	Opposition-funded channel.	
SSTV	Sun Siyam Media	15 February 2023	Current affairs channel.	
Sangu TV	Cocona International Pvt Ltd	30 April 2015	Current affairs channel.	
Channel 13	Media Ring Pvt Ltd	2012	Opposition-funded channel.	
Aslu TV	Broadcast House Pvt Ltd	25 January 2024	Current affairs channel.	
NTV	The Blues Maldives Pvt Ltd	27 September 2023	Current affairs channel.	
ICE TV	Ice Network Pvt Ltd	June 2014	Entertainment Channel.	
ICE Sports	Ice Network Pvt Ltd	14 June 2018	Licenced Sports Channel.	
ICE XTRA	Ice Network Pvt Ltd	2022	Licenced Sports Channel.	
ICE ULTRA	Ice Network Pvt Ltd	2026	Licenced Sports Channel.	
ICE Premier League	Ice Network Pvt Ltd	2026	Premier League Licenced Sports Channel.	
Mendhuru TV	Global Media Pvt Ltd	10 October 2024	Current affairs channel.	
MMTV	Maldives Media House Pvt Ltd	17 November 2024	Government-Affiliated Channel.	
Dhaaris TV	Sameeku Pvt Ltd	15 October 2022	Islamic channel	

=== Defunct channels ===
Name	Owner	Launched	Closed	Information	Reference(s)
TVM Plus	PSM	29 March 1978	unknown	Subscription service.	
Future TV	unknown	5 June 2008	unknown	First private television station.	
