= Sithi Fulhu =

Sithi Fulhu was a Maldivian actress mostly known for her comical roles in the films.

== Career ==
In 1992, Sithi Fulhu collaborated with Yoosuf Rafeeu for his drama film, Loabi Veveynee Furaana Dheegen followed by another collaboration with Yoosuf Rafeeu for his tragedy drama film Vaudhu (1993) which narrates the separation of a happy couple due to the societal differences. She played the comical role of Mareena, a woman who secretly dates her friend's husband, in Hussain Adil's comedy drama film Dhehithehge Loabi (1995) alongside Mariyam Nisha, Abdul Rahman Rauf and Ahmed Sharmeel. The film tells a story of two brothers who fall in love with the same girl, which causes rivalry and misunderstandings between them. She next appeared in Mohamed Shiyaz's Dhushman which features Hussain Sobah, Mariyam Nisha, Aminath Rasheedha and Hamid Ali in pivotal roles. In the film, she plays the role Thakuraar's wife who has been cheated for another girl. The following year, she made a brief appearance in his award winning film Haqqu as the protective mother of Lamha, a promiscuous woman who falls in love with a married man. The film starring Mariyam Nisha, Reeko Moosa Manik and Mariyam Shakeela in lead roles, received positive reviews from critics. Also, she starred as an aspiring film actress opposite Reeko Moosa Manik, Hassan Afeef, Niuma Mohamed and Mariyam Nazima in Easa Shareef-directed Emme Fahu Dhuvas (2000) which follows a devious woman who sunders her best-friend's upcoming marriage by creating false accusation and staging misleading impressions.

In 1997, Sithi Fulhu appeared alongside Hussain Sobah, Mariyam Nisha and Jamsheedha Ahmed as the loyal servant in Amjad Ibrahim's Loabeege Aniyaa. The following year, she starred in Mahdi Ahmed's Amaanaaiy alongside Ali Khalid, Jamsheedha Ahmed and Fathimath Rameeza. The film revolves around a man who is welcomed with his illegitimate son after the child's mother's death and the events that proceed when his wife is not fond of the child. It is based on Shekhar Kapur's Indian drama film Masoom (1983) which is a remake of the 1982 Malayalam movie Olangal, which are both adaptations of Man, Woman and Child, 1980 novel by Erich Segal. She played the role of Sithi Fulhu, a lady who saves a boy from a fight. The film was both critically and commercially appreciated. The same year, she starred as the heartbroken mother who has been disowned by her only child, in Hamid Ali's drama film Mila Handhuvaru (1998). Mariyam Shauqee's widely acclaimed family drama television series Kahthiri was released during the same year, where she played the role of a gossip-loving woman.

Amjad Ibrahim-directed Ainbehge Loabi Firiehge Vaajib, starring Ahmed, Yoosuf Shafeeu, Arifa Ibrahim and Niuma Mohamed was released in 2000. She played the role of Kuda Kaiydhaa Fulhu, a well wisher of Julia (played by Ahmed) who has been mistreated by her step-mother and forced into a marriage she disapproves. She next starred alongside Ali Seezan, Mariyam Nazima and Yoosuf Shafeeu as the humorous maid, in Mohamed Rasheed's Hithu Vindhu (2002). She again worked with Amjad Ibrahim for his comedy drama film Qurbaani (1999) starring opposite Yoosuf Shafeeu, Mariyam Nisha and Hussain Sobah. The film was a financially successful project and was declared a Mega-Hit at the end of its run at cinema. She next starred alongside Ahmed Asim, Mariyam Nazima, Koyya Hassan Manik and Waleedha Waleed as a gossiping woman in Haajara Abdul Kareem-directed Ajaaib which depicts the relationship of two exemplary wives and their respective families regardless of societal norms. The same year, she starred in another Amjad Ibrahim's direction, a comedy drama film, Majubooru Loabi (2000) opposite Mariyam Nisha and Yoosuf Shafeeu which focuses on a failing marriage of a comprehensive man and an emotionally immature woman.

Also, she appeared in a brief role as a sorcerer practicing black magic in Abdul Fatthah's critically praised romantic film Vehey Vaarey Therein (2003). Featuring Yoosuf Shafeeu, Jamsheedha Ahmed, Khadheeja Ibrahim Didi, Mohamed Shavin, Amira Ismail and Aminath Rasheedha in crucial roles, the film narrates the story of unrequited love, and proved to be one of the highest-grossing Maldivian films of the year.

== Filmography ==
=== Feature film ===
Year	Title	Role	Notes	Ref(s)
—N/a	Jazubaathu			
1990	Karunaige Agu	Shiyana's grandmother	Special appearance	
1992	Loabi Veveynee Furaana Dheegen	Sihthi		
1992	Gudhurathuge Niyaa	Hareera		
1993	Beyvafaa	Kaiydha		
1993	Udhaas	Shareefa		
1993	Hadhiyaa	Herself	Special appearance	
1993	Mithuru			
1995	Dhehithehge Loabi	Mareena		
1995	Masthu			
1995	Dhushman	Thakuraar's wife		
1996	Hagu An'bi	Raziyya		
1996	Haqqu	Lamha's mother	Special appearance	
1997	Loabeege Aniyaa	Sithi Fulhu		
1998	Amaanaaiy	Sithi Fulhu	Special appearance	
1998	Mila Handhuvaru	Sithi Fulhu		
1998	Ethoofaaneerey	Faathuma	Special appearance	
1999	Qurbaani	Khadheeja		
2000	Ainbehge Loabi Firiehge Vaajib	Kuda Kaiydhaa Fulhu		
2000	Ajaaib	Dhaleyka		
2000	Majubooru Loabi	Sheela		
2000	Emme Fahu Dhuvas	Actress		
2002	Hithu Vindhu	Kadhee		
2003	Edhi Edhi Hoadheemey	Herself	Special appearance	
2003	Vehey Vaarey Therein	Sorcerer	Special appearance	

=== Television ===
Year	Title	Role	Notes	Ref(s)
—N/a	Kaadu Foshi			
1992	Lava Hotaa	Anuradha		
1995	Dhiriulhumakee Mieebaa?		In the episode "Foni Muraadhu"	
1996	Kolhukehi	Sithi Fulhu		
1996	Dhiriulhumakee Mieebaa?	Shareefa	In the episode "Muhammaa Kaloa"	
1997	Dhiriulhumakee Mieebaa?	Azza	In the episode "Love '97"	
1997–1999	Kahthiri	Faathuma	Recurring role; 13 episodes	
