= Dhivehi FM =

Maldives
- Frequency: 91.0 MHz

Programming
- Languages: Dhivehi; English

Ownership
- Owner: Public Service Media

History
- First air date: 1 April 2006; 19 years ago

Links
- Website: psmnews.mv

Dhivehi FM is a radio station in the Maldives, run by Public Service Media. Founded on 1 April 2006, it is youth-oriented and primarily broadcasts music.
