= Nibu =

Nibu may refer to:

== People ==
- Akari Nibu (born 2001), Japanese celebrity

== Places ==
- Mount Nebo or Nibu, Jordan
- Nibu Station, Japan

== Other ==
- Niboo or Nibu, Maldivian film
