= Salhi Baisaa =

Maldivian television series

- Directed by: Mohamed Niyaz
- Music by: I.D; Hassan Haleem; Shiham; Ahmed Amir
- Country of origin: Maldives
- Original language: Divehi

Production
- Editors: Ibrahim Iqbal; Hussain Shuhad; Mohamed Amsad

Original release
- Release: 1991 – 1992

Salhi Baisaa is Maldivian comedy drama television series created and developed by Mohamed Niyaz. It stars Ahmed Nimal, Hassan Haleem, Ahmed Simau and Ibrahim Khaleel in main roles. The series follows an old citizen, Ali, who brags about his fake accomplishment in his youth.

== Cast and characters ==
=== Main ===
- Ahmed Nimal as Ali
- Ahmed Simau as Qadhir/Sodhuree/Fareed/Razzaq/Javid/Dawood/Kahurab/Daroga
- Ibrahim Khaleel as Sobree/Rushdhee/Lomir/Sujau
- Hassan Manik as Sodhuree/Latheef
- Hassan Haleem as Ali Idhurees/Hassan/Jaufar

=== Recurring ===
- Fathimath Rameeza as Mariyam/Ziyadha/Zubeidha/Ithura
- Waleedha Waleed as Zainab/Leela
- Shadhiya as Qadhir's wife/Zubeidha/Saeedha
- Sharumeela as Samiya
- Muaz Shaheem as Ali's friend/Jamsheedh
- Ibrahim Shakir as Zubeidha's father/Shakir
- Ahmed Naeem as Ali's friend
- Aadhanu as Ahmedfulhu

=== Guest ===
- Abdulla Zaki as Professor Jaruman Ali (Episode 3)
- Waheedha as Sofiyya (Episode 4)
- Ahmedullah (Episode 4)
- Ibrahim Riyaz (Episode 5)
- Mohamed Shan (Episode 5)
- Abdulla Shameel (Episode 6)
- Fazuna Mohamed as Anna (Episode 6)
- Ziyad (Episode 6)
- Aminath as Jamsheed's girlfriend (Episode 7)
- Faruhadh (Episode 7)
- Ibrahim Rasheed as Nihan (Episode 8)

== Episodes ==
No. in season	Title	Directed by	Written by	Title character	Camera by	Original release date
1	"Episode 1"	Mohamed Niyaz	Ahmed Nimal	"Biru Kuda Ali"	Mohamed Manik, Abdulla Jameel, Hassan Haleem, Ibrahim Moosa	1991
Ali (Ahmed Nimal) narrates to his fellow visitor, Sobree (Ibrahim Khaleel) about his brave act on overpowering and killing the group leader of the mercenaries, Hassanthee, during the 1988 Maldives coup d'état attempt and how he remained the most courageous ordinary man among his friends. While he takes credit for quelling their attempt by summoning a gigantic creature, it is revealed that Ali was fake praising himself while he went hiding in fear during the coup.
2	"Episode 2"	Mohamed Niyaz	Ahmed Nimal	"Hiyy Gadha Ali"	Mohamed Manik	1991
Ali resents his sister, Saamiya dating an ordinary man, Sodhuree (Ahmed Simau) and confines her from ever meeting him. Unable to terminate their affair, Ali casts a spell on Sodhuree and shrinks him who later pleads to Ali to restore him to his original size on one condition, to never get in path of his sister's. Later it was revealed that it was in fact Ali who requested to marry his sister to Sodhuree, in greed of money.
3	"Episode 3"	Mohamed Niyaz	Abdullah Zaki	"Professor Jaruman Ali"	Mohamed Manik	1991
Failed in love, professor Jaruman Ali (Ahmed Nimal) experimented and developed a laboratory chemical which he believes can cure himself while attaining success in romantic relationships. As he takes a sip of the medicine, Ali undergoes a physical change in his appearance (later played by Abdullah Zaki) and struggles to be accepted in the community, though he manages to snatch the love of his life, Zainab (Waleedha Waleed) from her current relationship with Fareedh (Ahmed Simau). As his follower, Sobree (Ibrahim Khaleel) agrees to fund for the medicine, Zainab exposes his true self of fraud and artifice story-telling.
4	"Episode 4"	Mohamed Niyaz	Mohamed Niyaz	"Ishqee Ali"	Mohamed Manik	1991
Ali, brings forth his marriage plans with his love interest, Mariyam (Fathimath Rameeza), to her brother, Hassan (Hassan Haleem) who outright rejects him due to his impoverished nature and arranges her marriage with the wealthy man, Razzaq (Ahmed Simau). Due to their undying love towards each other, they both get married despite several efforts by Hassan and Razzaq to stop them. After the marriage Ali and Mariyam spent their happiest days together. However, this fabricated tale of Romeo and Juliet was exposed by his friend who claims that Ali had an extramarital affair with Mariyam's friend, Leela (Waleedha Waleed).
5	"Episode 5"	Mohamed Niyaz	Fibo Ahmed Manik	"Biru Kuda Ali"	Mohamed Manik	1991
In this segment, Ali flexes on how respected he was in the city for being the fearless and valorous man. However, in turn of events, Ali's wife, Zubeidha (Shadhiya) reveals that he is a fearful and agitated husband who is in fact too coward to face a robber.
6	"Episode 6"	Mohamed Niyaz	Mohamed Niyaz	"Mussan'dhi Ali"	Mohamed Manik	1992
7	"Episode 7"	Mohamed Niyaz	Mohamed Niyaz	"Jinni Ali"	Mohamed Manik	1992
8	"Episode 8"	Mohamed Niyaz	Mohamed Niyaz	"Naazuku Ali"	Mohamed Manik	1992

== Development ==
The series was developed based on a concept outlined by director Mohamed Niyaz. However, since he is not a professional screenwriter, Niyaz was assisted by lead actor Ahmed Nimal in drafting and finalizing the screenplay. In its second season, Niyaz took over the task of screenwriting alongside the work of editing and directing the series. The main concept of the series was Ahmed Nimal flexing about his fake accomplishments to Ibrahim Khaleel while relaxing on a swing located at the road end of Lonuziyaaraiy Magu.

== Soundtrack ==
Track listing
No.	Title	Lyrics	Music	Singer(s)	Length
1.	"Ummeedhu"	Abdul Raheem Rashadh	Mohamed Ikram	Ali Rameez

== Release and reception ==
The series was aired through Television Maldives, during the month of Ramadan. It was widely accepted as one of the most "unusually funny" television series developed during the time. The episodes released during 1992 was particularly noted by audience and critics as the "series best episodes". It was noted as the most popular local television production aired in Ramadan of 1991 and 1992.
