= Waleedha Waleed =

Maldivian film actress

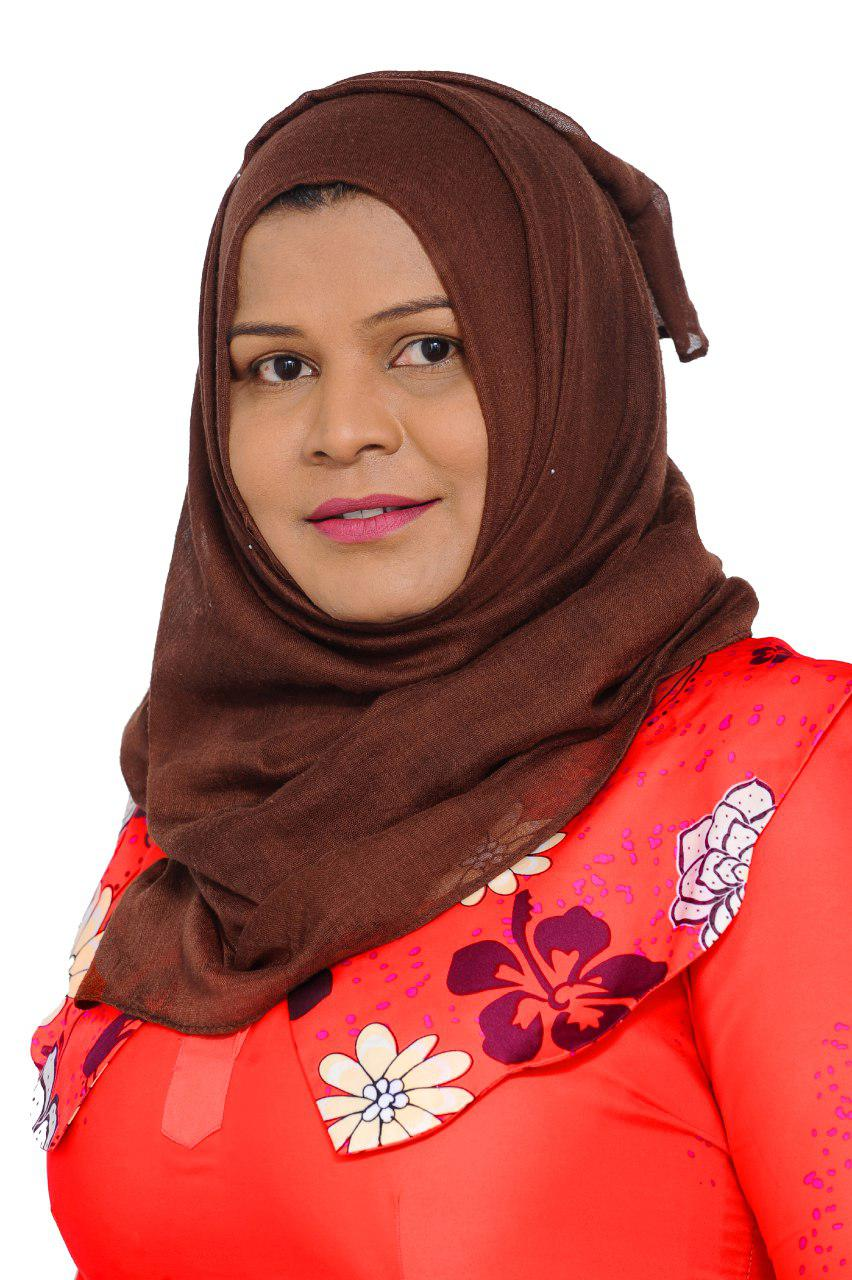
- Waleed in 2018
- Occupations: Actress, choreographer, politician
- Years active: 1989–present
- Political party: Independent (2023–present)
- Other political affiliations: Jumhooree Party (2011–2023)

Deputy Minister of Arts, Culture and Heritage
- In office 23 December 2018 – 17 November 2023
- President: Ibrahim Mohamed Solih

Waleedha Waleed is a Maldivian film actress, choreographer, director, seamstress and politician.

== Career ==
In 1989, at the age of fourteen, Waleedha Waleed made her screen debut with a video single directed by Musthafa Hussain. She went on to feature in several other video songs and films. Waleed had most recognition for her songs included in the Vasmeeru album, which was produced by Television Maldives. In an interview with Avas, Waleed mentioned; "What made me go a long way in my career is the belief that people cheer me as a good dancer though I am not trained in any dance style". She then featured in some of the films including Ibrahim Rasheed's Loabeege Thoofan (1991) opposite Reeko Moosa Manik. Her next appearance came in Ibrahim Rasheed-directed film Beyvafaa where she plays a blind orphan.

Hamid Ali's Badhal was released in 1996, in which she starred alongside Ali, Hussain Sobah and Niuma Mohamed as a mentally challenged young woman with an immature attitude who is being duped in a series of events caused due to a misunderstanding by a "non-existent" twin. This was followed by the Yoosuf Rafeeu's comedy film Nibu, an unofficial remake of Gulzar's Bollywood comedy film Angoor (1982), which focuses on two pairs of identical twins separated at birth and how their lives go haywire when they meet in adulthood. In 1998, Waleed played the role of a seductive woman trying to break a happy marriage in the Abdul Faththaah-directed romantic drama series Aisha alongside Jamsheedha Ahmed and Ibrahim Hilmy.

In 2000, Waleed starred alongside Ahmed Asim, Mariyam Nazima and Koyya Hassan Manik in the Haajara Abdul Kareem-directed Ajaaib which depicts the relationship of two exemplary wives and their respective families regardless of societal norms. The following year, she appeared as an understanding wife in Aslam Rasheed's romantic thriller film Dheevaanaa which was an unofficial remake of Ram Gopal Varma's romantic thriller Pyaar Tune Kya Kiya (2001) starring Urmila Matondkar, Fardeen Khan and Sonali Kulkarni. The film narrates the story of a woman who falls in love with an already married photographer and sets out to get what she wants, no matter what the consequences may be. The same year she starred as a mentally ill woman in Fathimath Nahula's drama film Naaummeedhu (2000) which depicts the story of a happily married couple whose life is shattered into pieces when they unintentionally invite a seductive woman into their life. The film received favorable reviews from critics and emerged as the highest grossing Maldivian film of the year.

Waleed worked with Amjad Ibrahim for his romantic horror film Dhonkamana (2003) which narrates the romantic relationship between a young man (played by Yoosuf Shafeeu) and an old woman (played by Fauziyya Hassan). Featuring Hassan, Yoosuf Shafeeu, Sheela Najeeb, Niuma Mohamed, Sheereen Abdul Wahid and Amira Ismail, the film received mainly negative reviews from critics though its portrayal of the relationship between a couple with a large age difference was praised. Waleed collaborated with Abdul Faththaah for his romantic disaster film, Hureemey Inthizaarugaa (2005) cast along with Ravee Farooq, Mariyam Zuhura, Ibrahim Jihad and Neena Saleem. The film, heavily reliant on the effect of the 2004 Indian Ocean earthquake on the Maldives, received favorable reviews from critics though it failed to perform financially. She played the rich woman who fulfills all her needs through money. Besides acting, Waleed has directed some television series made for Television Maldives.

== Politics ==
On 7 January 2018, Waleed was elected as the president of the Women’s League of Jumhooree Party.

She was arrested in 2018 during an opposition rally during the 2018 Maldives political crisis.

On 23 December 2018, Ibrahim Mohamed Solih appointed Waleed as Deputy Minister of Arts, Culture and Heritage.

In 2023, she resigned from the Jumhooree Party after endorsing Ibrahim Mohamed Solih for the 2023 Maldivian presidential election.

== Personal life ==
During her free time, Waleed became more occupied with dress-making and fashion designing. After her marriage, she took a break from acting and spent most of the time learning and teaching sewing. In order to pursue a career as a seamstress, Waleed initiated a dressmaking business and opened a small workroom besides travelling different islands while organizing sewing courses.

== Filmography ==
=== Feature film ===
Year	Title	Role	Notes	Ref(s)
1991	Hithuge Vindhu		1st film	
1991	Loabeege Thoofan	Saamiya		
1992	Maavaharuge Hadhiyaa			
1993	Imthihaan	Ameena		
1993	Beyvafaa	Sharumeela		
1993	Thuhumathu	Shifa		
1993	Udhaas	Nazima		
1996	Badhal	Shaarudha		
1996	Niboo	Shahidha		
1997	Diary	Shehenaz		
1998	Dhauvaa	Soma Hassan		
2000	Ajaaib	Rasheedha		
2000	Saahibaa	Mariyam		
2000	Shaalinee	Varudha		
2001	Dheevaanaa	Reesha		
2001	Naaummeedhu	Haseena	Special appearance	
2003	Dhonkamana	Shahil's sister		
2003	Vehey Vaarey Therein	Herself	Special appearance in the song "Hama Nidhi Nunidheyney"	
2005	Hureemey Inthizaarugaa	Nasheedha		

=== Television ===
Year	Title	Role	Notes	Ref(s)
1991–1992	Salhi Baisaa	Zainab/Leela	Recurring role; 2 episodes	
1993	Zaizafoona	Nishama	Teledrama	
1994	Qurubaan	Nashfa	Recurring role; 2 episodes	
1997	Dhiriulhumakee Mieebaa?	Ainthu	Episode: "Love '97"	
1997	Dhiriulhumakee Mieebaa?	Saadhuna	Episode: "Jaajaa Mijaajaa"	
1998–1999	Aisha	Nahidha	Main role	
2000	Reysham	Shaahidha	Main role; 9 episodes	
2000	Kashithanmathi		Teledrama	
2002	Fahu Fiyavalhu	Zuhudha	Guest role; "Episode 1"	
2003	Vaisoori	Fareedha	In the segment "Kurin Visnaa Dhevunu Nama"	
2003–2004	Thiyey Mihithuge Vindhakee	Adheel's sister	Guest role; "Episode 22"	
2009	Mihithah Loabi Dheyshey	Haatha	Recurring role; 7 episodes	

== Accolades ==
Year	Award	Category	Nominated work	Result	Ref(s)
2007	3rd Gaumee Film Awards	Best Choreography		Won	
