= Media of the Maldives =

map of the Maldives

The media of the Maldives refers to the print, broadcast and online media in the Maldives. Television was introduced in the Maldives on March 29, 1978, being picked up by an audience of 90 television sets in Male, the national capital. Until 2008, the Maldives only had Television Maldives as its national broadcaster. While independent media saw significant expansion following political reforms in 2008, press freedom remains a subject of domestic and international debate, heavily influenced by local politics and religion.
