= Diary (1996 film) =

- Official film poster
- Directed by: Mohamed Aboobakuru
- Written by: Mohamed Aboobakuru
- Screenplay by: Mohamed Aboobakuru
- Produced by: Mohamed Aboobakuru
- Starring: Hassan Afeef; Waleedha Waleed; Mohamed Aboobakuru; Arifa Ibrahim
- Cinematography: Hussain Mauzoom
- Production company: Slam Studio
- Release date: 1996
- Running time: 126 minutes
- Country: Maldives
- Language: Dhivehi

Diary is a 1996 Maldivian drama film written, produced and directed by Mohamed Aboobakuru. The film stars Hassan Afeef, Waleedha Waleed, Mohamed Aboobakuru and Arifa Ibrahim in pivotal roles.

== Premise ==
Arif (Hassan Afeef), an only child, begins a romantic relationship with Shehenaz (Waleedha Waleed), a well-educated woman. The couple plan their marriage when Arif suspects his best friend, Fayaz (Mohamed Aboobakuru) is deeply in love with Shehenaz. However, Fayaz explains that his secret girlfriend is Saudhiyya who is now engaged to another man. Arif is diagnosed with stage 4 pancreatic cancer which has now spread to his liver and he is given six months to live. Arif requests Fayaz to marry Shehenaz and to keep her happy.

== Cast ==
- Hassan Afeef as Arif
- Waleedha Waleed as Shehenaz
- Mohamed Aboobakuru as Fayaz
- Arifa Ibrahim as Shehenaz's mother
- Hamid Wajeeh as Saleem
- Aminath Mohamed Didi as Arif's mother
- Mohamed Azim as Shehenaz's brother
- Sheleen as Shehenaz's sister
- Dhilaavathu

== Soundtrack ==
Track listing
No.	Title	Lyrics	Singer(s)	Length
1.	"Maa Nikamethi Mee Insaanekey"	Ahmed Sharumeel	Abdul Hannan Moosa Didi
2.	"Heelaashey Kalaa Loabivaa"	Ahmed Sharumeel	Abdul Hannan Moosa Didi
3.	"Hiyy Mi Milkey"	Ahmed Sharumeel	Abdul Hannan Moosa Didi, Fathimath Zoona
4.	"Dheyneehey Sazaa Loabivaa"	Ahmed Sharumeel	Shifa Thaufeeq
5.	"Yaaraa Ulheyney Foruvan"	Ahmed Sharumeel	Abdul Hannan Moosa Didi, Shifa Thaufeeq

== Accolades ==
Year	Award	Category	Recipient(s)	Result	Ref(s)
1997	Aafathis Awards - 1997	Best Supporting Actress	Arifa Ibrahim	Won	
