= Dhanmalhi =

- Official film poster
- Written by: Reeko Moosa Manik
- Directed by: Reeko Moosa Manik
- Starring: Reeko Moosa Manik; Lilian Saeed; Suneetha
- Country of origin: Maldives
- Original language: Dhivehi

Production
- Producer: Television Maldives
- Cinematography: Mohamed Manik; Mohamed Rasheed
- Editor: Moosa Haleem

Original release
- Network: Television Maldives
- Release: 1993

Dhanmalhi is a 1993 Maldivian teledrama directed by Reeko Moosa Manik. Produced and distributed by Television Maldives, the film stars Reeko Moosa Manik, Lilian Saeed and Suneetha in pivotal roles. The film shows the conflict between a husband and wife and the progression of the husband due to his wife's behavior.

== Premise ==
Idhrees (Reeko Moosa Manik) is married to an indolent, deceptive and manipulative wife, Faree (Lilian Saeed) who does no work other than sleep and watching television citing her ill-health. Idhrees, who is treated as a servant to Faree gets his final warning at his job for being continuously late to work. Hussainfulhu (Koyya Hassan Manik), a well wisher for Idhrees, advises him to take control of his life. Meanwhile, a colleague of Idhrees, Hafsa (Suneetha) shows interest towards him while his wife suspects him having an affair with another woman.

== Cast ==
- Reeko Moosa Manik as Idhrees
- Lilian Saeed as Fareedha
- Suneetha as Hafsa
- Koyya Hassan Manik as Hussainfulhu
- Arifa Ibrahim as Fareedha's mother
- Shakir as Solih

== Reception ==
Upon release, the film mainly received mixed to positive reviews from critics. It was lauded for demonstrating the classical regressive view from a female's perspective unlike other locals releases and also for the performance of Reeko Moosa Manik and Lilian Saeed. Similarly, another critic applauded the cinematographer and director's work in utilizing the locations as a "transitioning point" in the film, however criticized the film makers conception of a healthy marriage.
