= Mila Handhuvaru =

- Official film poster
- Directed by: Hamid Ali
- Written by: Hussain Rasheed
- Screenplay by: Hamid Ali
- Produced by: Hussain Rasheed
- Cinematography: Hamid Ali
- Edited by: Hamid Ali
- Production company: Farivaa Films
- Release date: November 11, 1998
- Country: Maldives
- Language: Dhivehi

Mila Handhuvaru is a 1998 Maldivian drama film edited and directed by Hamid Ali. Produced by Hussain Rasheed under Farivaa Films, the film stars Mariyam Nisha and Mohamed Hussain in pivotal roles.

== Premise ==
Adamfulhu (Amjad Ibrahim) disowned his only child, Sameem, when he married an under-privileged woman whom he despised. They give birth to a daughter before the couple was killed in a boat crash, leaving their daughter, Mariyam (Mariyam Nisha), and her aunt as two of the few survivors. Realizing his mistake, Adamfulhu hailed Mariyam as his own child. Long back, Adamfulhu and Sithi Fulhu (Sithi Fulhu) arranged a deal to marry their children, Mariyam and Ihusan (Mohamed Hassan) who have not met each other. In order to evade from the marriage, Mariyam fakes a relationship and lied to Adamfulhu saying that she has secretly married someone else. Ihusan becomes an aspiring actor while Mariyam hires him to act like her husband.

== Cast ==
- Mariyam Nisha as Mariyam
- Mohamed Hassan as Ihusan / Ishaq
- Hamid Ali as Hamid
- Nathasha as Niuma
- Amjad Ibrahim as Adamfulhu
- Aminath Ishnan Inan
- Sithi Fulhu as Sithi Fulhu

== Soundtrack ==
Track listing
No.	Title	Lyrics	Singer(s)	Length
1.	"Thiya Dhooni"	Ahmed Sharumeel	Ahmed Waheedh
2.	"Dhen Othee Hoadhumey"	Easa Shareef	Mohamed Rashad, Shifa Thaufeeq
3.	"Fari Mooney Thee Hoadhaalaa"	Ahmed Sharumeel	Mohamed Shahuban, Fathimath Zoona
