= Dhauvaa =

- Official film poster
- Directed by: Arifa Ibrahim
- Screenplay by: Easa Shareef; Arifa Ibrahim
- Produced by: Aslam Rasheed
- Starring: Reeko Moosa Manik; Niuma Mohamed; Waleedha Waleed
- Cinematography: Ibrahim Moosa
- Edited by: Ibrahim Rafeeu
- Music by: Imad Ismail
- Production company: Slam Studio
- Release date: 1998
- Country: Maldives
- Language: Dhivehi

Dhauvaa is a 1998 Maldivian film directed by Arifa Ibrahim. Produced by Aslam Rasheed under Slam Studio, the film stars Reeko Moosa Manik, Niuma Mohamed and Waleedha Waleed in pivotal roles. The film was an unofficial remake of Deepak Sareen's Bollywood film Aaina (1993), starring Juhi Chawla, Jackie Shroff and Amrita Singh in lead roles.

== Premise ==
Soma Hassan (Waleedha Waleed) and Seema Hassan (Niuma Mohamed) are two siblings who have grown up to be entirely different to each other. The former is an arrogant, spoiled child who gets everything she desires at any cost while the latter is a soft-spoken, sensitive shy girl who lets her sister take the limelight. Complications arise between the siblings when the two sisters fall in love with the same man, Mohamed Areesh (Reeko Moosa Manik).

== Cast ==
- Reeko Moosa Manik as Mohamed Areesh
- Niuma Mohamed as Seema Hassan
  - Mariyam Sheleen as Young Seema Hassan
- Waleedha Waleed as Soma Hassan
  - Shifaza as Young Soma Hassan
- Arifa Ibrahim as Soma and Seema's mother
- Ali Shameel as Hassan Manik
- Ibrahim Wisan as Ayaz; Areesh's brother
- Roanu Hassan Manik
- Aminath Ibrahim Didi as an auction member (Special appearance)
- Hamid Ali as Seema's Doctor (Special appearance)

== Soundtrack ==
Track listing
No.	Title	Lyrics	Music	Singer(s)	Length
1.	"Komme Vindhakun Jahaa"	Easa Shareef	Imaadh Ismail	Mariyam Waheedha, Imaadh Ismail	3:25
2.	"Thiya Heelaa Gothun"	Easa Shareef	Imaadh Ismail	Mariyam Waheedha, Imaadh Ismail	3:57
3.	"Aniyaa Vey Aniyaa"	Mariyam Waheedha	Imaadh Ismail	Mariyam Waheedha, Imaadh Ismail	4:43
4.	"Meebaa E Hama Naseebakee"	Easa Shareef	Imaadh Ismail	Mariyam Waheedha	4:31
5.	"Loabi Hoadhan Kuraa Dhauvaa"	Easa Shareef	Imaadh Ismail	Mariyam Waheedha, Imaadh Ismail	4:53
6.	"Heenukuraahaa Loabi Vamey"	Easa Shareef	Imaadh Ismail	Mariyam Waheedha	2:31
