= Haqqu =

- Official film poster
- Directed by: Yoosuf Rafeeu
- Written by: Ibrahim Waheed
- Screenplay by: Ibrahim Waheed
- Produced by: Yoosuf Rafeeu
- Starring: Reeko Moosa Manik; Mariyam Nisha; Mariyam Shakeela
- Cinematography: Mohamed Rasheed
- Edited by: Easa Shareef; Yoosuf Rafeeu
- Music by: Bukhari Films
- Production company: Bukhari Films
- Release date: 1996
- Country: Maldives
- Language: Dhivehi

Haqqu (English: right) is a 1996 Maldivian drama film produced and directed by Yoosuf Rafeeu. Produced under Bukhari Films, the film stars Reeko Moosa Manik, Mariyam Nisha and Mariyam Shakeela in pivotal roles.

== Plot ==
Shahid (Reeko Moosa Manik) was sitting on the breakwater when Areesha (Mariyam Shakeela) accidentally knocks him into the sea. He lashes out to her though she kept smiling shyly. Areeka hid Shahid's wallet and invited him to her house if he wants the wallet. Areeka's father, Imad and Shahid's father, Amjad (Roanu Hassan Manik) are childhood best-friends. They decided to marry their kids off despite Shahid's dissent. However, he determined to marry Areeka, solely for the sake of his parents. Before their marriage, Shahid meets Lamha (Mariyam Nisha) whom he fell in love instantly. Shahid disclose to Areeka that he loves another woman whereas Areeka considered it a jest.

Shahid took a vacation and spends time in an island where he again meets Lamha. He declares his affection towards her but Lamha wanted nothing more than friendship since she was aware of his planned marriage. Amjad was informed of Shahid's affair who warn him not to do anything that will harm their family's reputation. Shahid kept secretly meeting Lamha, concerning his parents. Lamha attended Shahid and Areesha's wedding party and it was revealed that Lamha and Areesha know each other and they are friends. Shahid continuously keeps avoiding Areesha. One night, Shahid took Lamha to the cinema while Areesha requesting to take her with him. Areesha's friend break the news to her and she secretly follows him to Lamha's house. She confronted Lamha to leave Shahid alone. Lamha divulged her affection towards Shahid.

Lamha and Hameed (Easa Shareef) ploys to create a scene in order to make Shahid detest Lamha. Hameed informs Shahid that Lamha is a promiscuous woman. Refusing to believe, Shahid goes to Lamha's house and witness her with another man in the darkness. Shahid apologised to Areesha and decided to move on with her. Nine months later, she gives birth to a son. One day when Shahid was visiting Hameed, he sees Lamha with Hameed and was disturbed to hear Lamha saying she is pleased to see Shahid is in a happy marriage because of her. Shahid suspects Hameed is hiding something from him. He later discovers from Hameed an Areesha that Lamha is in fact a slut but she is a changed woman now.

== Cast ==
- Reeko Moosa Manik as Shahid
- Mariyam Nisha as Lamha
- Mariyam Shakeela as Areesha
- Easa Shareef as Hameed
- Arifa Ibrahim as Asima; Shahid's mother
- Roanu Hassan Manik as Amjad; Shahid's father
- Abdul Raheem as Imad; Areesha's father
- Nooma Ibrahim as Niya; Areesha's best friend
- Mariyam Haajara as Hameed wife
- Sithi Fulhu as Lamha's mother (special appearance)
- Neena Saleem as Naaznee (special appearance)
- Aminath Rasheedha as Madheeha (special appearance)

== Soundtrack ==
Track listing
| No. | Title | Lyrics | Singer(s) | Length |
|---|---|---|---|---|
| 1. | "Annakan Ingey" | Easa Shareef | Fathimath Zoona |
| 2. | "Dhannamutho Ey Loabeega" | | Fathimath Zoona, Umar Zahir |
| 3. | "Mooney Thee Hiyy Edhey" | Mausoom Shakir | Umar Zahir |
| 4. | "Thedhekey Ufaa Dheefaa Nudhey" | Mausoom Shakir | Umar Zahir |

== Accolades ==
| Year | Award | Category | Recipients | Result |
|---|---|---|---|---|
| 1997 | 2nd Gaumee Film Awards | Best Film | Haqqu | Won |
| 1997 | 2nd Gaumee Film Awards | Best Actor | Reeko Moosa Manik | Won |
| 1997 | 2nd Gaumee Film Awards | Best Actress | Mariyam Nisha | Won |
| 1997 | 2nd Gaumee Film Awards | Best Male Playback Singer | Umar Zahir - "Mooney Thee Hiyy Edhey" | Won |
| 1997 | 2nd Gaumee Film Awards | Best Lyricist | Mausoom Shakir - "Mooney Thee Hiyy Edhey" | Won |
