= Edhi Edhi Hoadheemey =

2003 Maldivian film

- Directed by: Hussain Shafeeu
- Produced by: Mohamed Rasheed
- Starring: Yoosuf Shafeeu; Mariyam Nisha; Ismail Rasheed
- Cinematography: Hussain Mauzoom
- Edited by: Hussain Mauzoom
- Music by: Ahmed Riyaz
- Production company: KMR Productions
- Release date: 2003
- Country: Maldives
- Language: Dhivehi

Edhi Edhi Hoadheemey is a 2003 Maldivian film directed by Hussain Shafeeu. Produced by Rasheed under KMR Productions, the film stars Yoosuf Shafeeu, Mariyam Nisha and Ismail Rasheed in pivotal roles, marking Ismail Rasheed's debut performance in a feature film.

== Premise ==
Thoyyib (Ismail Rasheed) casually sees a snippet of a beautiful and diffident girl, Meera (Mariyam Nisha) whom he falls in love to the point he loses his sanity. Thoyyib tries all the possible ways to attain Meera's attention and affection. However all his plans backfire on the night of Meera's birthday, where she agrees to start a romantic relationship with her childhood friend, Rashwan (Yoosuf Shafeeu). Thoyyib lives a depressive life and Meera feels her life remains incomplete even with Rashwan's presence. Meera requests Rashwan to fast track their marriage plans while Rashwan chooses to complete his university studies before marrying her. Desperately, seeking revenge from him, Meera asks Thoyyib to marry her though she does not love him.

== Cast ==
- Yoosuf Shafeeu as Rashwan
- Mariyam Nisha as Meera
- Ismail Rasheed as Thoyyib
- Chilhiya Moosa Manik as Ahammad; Meera's father
- Arifa Ibrahim as Latheefa; Meera's mother
- Aminath Ibrahim Didi as Thoyyib's mother
- Fauziyya Hassan as Dhon Aimina; Meera's grandmother
- Fathimath Mufliha as Malee
- Aishath Haleem as Shaahy; Meera's best-friend
- Sheereen Abdul Wahid as Naaz; Meera's friend
- Hussain Shibau as Niyaz
- Mohamed Shameem as Ali
- Shameema as Naaz's mother (Special appearance)
- Abdulla Naseer (Special appearance)
- Sithi Fulhu (Special appearance)

== Soundtrack ==
Track listing
| No. | Title | Lyrics | Music | Singer(s) | Length |
|---|---|---|---|---|---|
| 1. | "Dhon Moonakun" | Kopee Mohamed Rasheedh | Ahmed Ziyadh (Ziya) | Ali Rameez | 4:37 |
| 2. | "Feenaashe Jehunee" | Kopee Mohamed Rasheedh | Ahmed Ziyadh (Ziya) | Mohamed Rashad | 4:51 |
| 3. | "Thiya Reethi Moonu Loabin" | Kopee Mohamed Rasheedh | Ahmed Ziyadh (Ziya) | Ali Rameez, Shifa Thaufeeq | 5:33 |
| 4. | "Ossifavaa Iru Eree Ey" | Kopee Mohamed Rasheedh | Ahmed Ziyadh (Ziya) | Abdul Hannan Moosa Didi, Shifa Thaufeeq | 6:41 |
| 5. | "Dhila Hoonugaa" | Kopee Mohamed Rasheedh | Ahmed Ziyadh (Ziya) | Abdul Hannan Moosa Didi, Fathimath Rauf | 5:36 |
| 6. | "Hithu Therey" | Kopee Mohamed Rasheedh | Ahmed Ziyadh (Ziya) | Hassan Ilham, Fazeela Amir | 5:20 |
| 7. | "Abadhaa Abadhu Hinithun Vumey" | Kopee Mohamed Rasheedh | Ahmed Ziyadh (Ziya) | Abdul Hannan Moosa Didi | 1:13 |
| 8. | "Farudhaa Kehunee" | Kopee Mohamed Rasheedh | Ahmed Ziyadh (Ziya) | Mohamed Rashad | 1:35 |

== Response ==
Upon release, the film received mainly positive reviews from critics. Hilath Rasheed reviewing from Haveeru Daily praised the "splendid" performance by Mariyam Nisha and also the moments of "pure artistry and sheer film-making brilliance" in the film. Acknowledging the attempt of directors for its revelation moment, he wrote: "directors tackle a subject which has and is still a pressing social problem but hardly discussed, at least not in typical Dhivehi films which is happy to package "love" as a "Mills & Boon" type of superficial feeling". Criticizing the "oversimplified" climax, he noted that "Rasheed's natural comedic movements and gestures, coupled with a script full of humour, makes the lengthy scenes more tolerable".

== Accolades ==
| Year | Award | Category | Recipients | Result | Ref. |
|---|---|---|---|---|---|
| 2007 | 4th Gaumee Film Awards | Best Actress | Mariyam Nisha | Nominated | |
| 2007 | 4th Gaumee Film Awards | Best Lyricist | Mohamed Rasheed - "Ossifaavaa" | Won | |
| 2007 | 4th Gaumee Film Awards | Best Playback Singer – Male | Abdul Hannan Moosa Didi - "Ossifavaa Iru Eree Ey" | Won | |
| 2007 | 4th Gaumee Film Awards | Best Playback Singer – Female | Shifa Thaufeeq - "Ossifavaa Iru Eree Ey" | Won | |
