= Loabeege Thoofan =

- Directed by: Dhon Annaaru Rasheed
- Written by: Hussain Rasheed
- Screenplay by: Dhon Annaaru Rasheed
- Produced by: Hussain Rasheed
- Starring: Reeko Moosa Manik; Athifa; Waleedha Waleed
- Cinematography: Abdulla Shibau
- Edited by: Dhon Annaaru Rasheed
- Music by: Ahmed Ayas
- Production company: Farivaa Film
- Release date: 1991
- Country: Maldives
- Language: Dhivehi

Loabeege Thoofan is a 1991 Maldivian drama film directed by Dhon Annaaru Rasheed. Produced by Hussain Rasheed under Farivaa Film, the film stars Reeko Moosa Manik, Athifa and Waleedha Waleed in pivotal roles.

== Premise ==
Akram (Reeko Moosa Manik) joins a hospital as the chief surgeon where he meets a dedicated nurse, Naazleen (Athifa) who is dealing with the untimely death of her mother. The colleagues spend most of their time together and build a romantic relationship. He announces his plans of marriage in-front of his guardians which causes a ripple in the family since they are planning his marriage to their daughter, Saamiya (Waleedha Waleed).

== Cast ==
- Reeko Moosa Manik as Akram; chief surgeon
- Athifa as Naazlen; a nurse
- Waleedha Waleed as Saamiya
- Fathimath Didi
- Aminath
- Abdulla Saleem
- Soburee
- Asfaree
- Dhon Annaaru Ibrahim Rasheed
- Chilhiya Moosa Manik

== Soundtrack ==
Track listing
No.	Title	Lyrics	Singer(s)	Length
1.	"Naangaanuhey Sirrun Thiya Hiyy"	Easa Shareef	Imaadh Ismail, Shafeeqa Abdul Latheef
2.	"Handhaanun Filaaneyhey?"	Easa Shareef	Imaadh Ismail
3.	"Adhu Mi Haalaath Fidhaa Veveythee Ey"	Mohamed Rasheedh (Dhon Annaaru)	Mohamed Manik
