= Dhushman =

- Official film poster
- Directed by: Mohamed Shiyaz
- Written by: Hamid Ali
- Screenplay by: Hamid Ali
- Produced by: Hussain Rasheed
- Starring: Mariyam Nisha; Hussain Sobah; Aminath Rasheedha; Hamid Ali
- Cinematography: Mohamed Shiyaz
- Edited by: Abdulla Sujau
- Music by: Euphonius
- Production company: Farivaa Films
- Release date: 1995
- Country: Maldives
- Language: Dhivehi

Dhushman is a 1995 Maldivian drama film directed by Mohamed Shiyaz. Produced by Hussain Rasheed under Farivaa Films, the film stars Mariyam Nisha, Hussain Sobah, Aminath Rasheedha and Hamid Ali in pivotal roles.

== Plot ==
Riyaz (Hussain Sobah), a poor student, disturbed with the loud radio sports commentary played by Nisha (Mariyam Nisha), a rich student from the same college, involves in a heated argument with Nisha. Principal threatened to exile Riyaz but Nisha withdrew her complaint against him. Nisha apologizes to Riyaz and he accepts, resulting a friendship grow between them. Riyaz and Nisha rehearses for exam together and start spending more time with each other. On the day of exam, Riyaz was informed of his father's illness and quickly leaves to his island which results him missing the exam.

Nisha spends the holiday at a resort. She misses Riyaz and it breaks her heart not hearing any news from him. Riyaz eavesdrops and hears his sister-in-law quarrel with his brother on Riyaz's accommodation at their house. Hence, he leaves them, transferring the properties of the house on their name while promising never to disturb them again. Nisha negotiates with his father and assures a post of receptionist for Riyaz from her father's resort. Riyaz and Nisha loves each other and initiate a romantic relationship. Nisha's childhood friend Hamid (Hamid Ali) who is secretly in love with Nisha, reveals their affair to Nisha's father. He embarrassed Riyaz in front of whole staff regarding his social status and forced Nisha to marry Hamid.

Riyaz quits his job and moves back to Male'. On returning, Hamid hired a contract killer and Riyaz was blinded in an accident. He is being treated by a friendly doctor Seema (Aminath Rasheedha). Seema takes Riyaz to her home since the hospital cannot accommodate him any further. On Riyaz's request, Hamid informs to Nisha that Riyaz is dead in the accident. Seeing her devastated with the news, Hamid brings Nisha to Riyaz, whom she sees staged playing romance with Seema. Nisha eventually agrees to marry Hamid. To get relieved from his memories, Nisha and Hamid spent some days abroad. Riyaz get a job as a live singer at a resort. Nisha and Hamid visits the same resort which Riyaz was performing. After his performance she slaps Riyaz and torment him. Despite Riyaz's request, Seema quickly reveals the truth to Nisha.

== Cast ==
- Mariyam Nisha as Nisha
- Hussain Sobah as Riyaz
- Hamid Ali as Hamid
- Aminath Rasheedha as Seema
- Ibrahim Shakir as Nisha's brother
- Aminath Ahmed Didi as Hamid's mother
- Easa Shareef as Riyaz's brother
- Mariyam Haajara as Haajara
- Sithi Fulhu as Thakuraaru's wife
- Ahmed Azim as Thakuraaru

== Soundtrack ==
Track listing
No.	Title	Lyrics	Singer(s)	Length
1.	"Aavaa Udhaahey"	Ahmed Sharumeel	Fathimath Zoona, Abdul Hannan Moosa Didi	03:09
2.	"Nudhey Nudhey Aadhey Aadhey"		Sofa Thaufeeq	04:09
3.	"Jaree Dhuniyeyge"		Mohamed Rashad	05:11
4.	"Raha Arugalee Mi Zaharun"		Mohamed Rashad	04:45
5.	"Naseebuvee Hithi Hithaama"		Mohamed Rashad	04:24
6.	"Loabeege Mee Inthihaa"		Sofa Thaufeeq	05:00
7.	"Belumaa Kuree Havaaley"		Fathimath Zoona	03:27
8.	"Nethi Gosvee Kuri Khiyaal"	Ahmed Riza (Tharaboozu)	Abdul Hannan Moosa Didi	04:31
Total length:				34:39
