= Munnaaru TV =

Television channel in the Maldives

Coordinates: 4.1716°N 73.5104°E

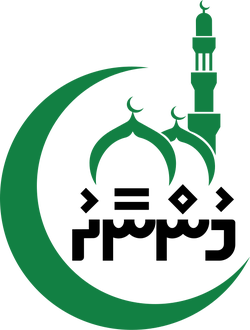
- Logo since 2016
- Country: Maldives
- Broadcast area: Maldives, South Asia
- Stations: PSM News
- Headquarters: Malé, Maldives

Programming
- Languages: Dhivehi; English
- Picture format: 480i SD

Ownership
- Owner: Public Service Media
- Sister channels: TVM; PSM news YES TV; Maldives TV; Dhivehi Raajjeyge Adu; Dhivehi FM; Dheenuge Adu; TVM Qur'an

History
- Launched: 29 December 2016; 9 years ago

Links
- Website: psmnews.mv

Availability

Terrestrial
- Medianet: 153
- SSNET: 20

Munnaaru TV (English: Dome TV) is the public service broadcasting Islamic Religious TV channel of the Maldives.

== History ==
It was formed on 29 December 2016 by former President of the Maldives Abdulla Yameen and the former Islamic Minister Ahmed Ziyad.

This channel only shows religious programs and series, including archived Religious Lectures, Islaamee Dhiri Ulhun, Muhammad Rasool Allah, Salahuddin Ayyoubi, etc.

During the COVID-19 Lockdown in 2020, Munnaaru TV, along with Yes TV, in association with the Ministry of Education aired the Telikilaas (Tele-Class) series, which won the UNESCO Wenhui Award for Educational Innovation.

The channel will be on air daily from 4 pm to 12 am, on Fridays at 11 am to 12 am and on specific days like Eid al-Fitr and Eid al-Adha will be on air at 6:30 am to 12 am. AT 12 am, a special Radio transmission of Dheenuge Adu, launched along with Munnaaru TV will be on.
