= Loabeega Aniyaa =

- Official film poster
- Directed by: Amjad Ibrahim
- Screenplay by: Amjad Ibrahim
- Produced by: Hussain Rasheed
- Starring: Mariyam Nisha; Hussain Sobah; Jamsheedha Ahmed; Hamid Ali
- Cinematography: Ali Rasheed
- Edited by: Ali Rasheed
- Music by: Muaviyath Anwar
- Production company: Farivaa Films
- Release date: March 3, 1997
- Country: Maldives
- Language: Dhivehi

Loabeega Aniyaa is a 1997 Maldivian drama film directed by Ahmed Shimau. Produced by Hussain Rasheed under Farivaa Films, the film stars Mariyam Nisha, Hussain Sobah, Jamsheedha Ahmed and Hamid Ali in pivotal roles.

== Plot ==
Sofa (Mariyam Nisha) an established actress decides to go on a vacation to an inhabited island for five days, where she meets Ahammaidhee (Hussain Sobah) an underprivileged talented vocalist. The duo spends most of the days hanging out with each other and exploring the island along with Ahamma's younger sister Mariyam (Jamsheedha Ahmed). Two weeks later, Sofa's father came to the island to take her back to Male'. She gives her Male' address to them and invites Ahamma and Mariyam to their house. She discloses her love for Ahamma, in front of her father and her producer Niyaz (Hamid Ali), who is secretly in love with her. Outraged, Niyaz announced that he is ready to go extreme extent to win Sofa's love and trust.

After convincing Ahamma's potential, Niyaz agreed to launch his career as an actor through his studio. Ahamma changed his name to Soba and his films received widespread acclaim. Niyaz, envious of Soba's achievements, decided to destroys Soba's career. On their wedding day, Soba unexpectedly meets with an accident, planned out by Niyaz. Besides some minor fractures, it was revealed that Soba will not be able to speak afterwards. Soba's role in the upcoming films and stage shows were replaced with other actors and Sofa asks for a break from acting to spend more time with Soba. Niyaz sends some goons to Sofa's house where one of them murders Sofa's father and Soba's presence in the crime scene forced Sofa to believe that the murderer is Soba. Empathizing for Soba, Sofa refused to hand him over to police. They later discovers Niyaz's involvement in Sofa's father's murder and is jailed.

== Cast ==
- Mariyam Nisha as Sofa
- Hussain Sobah as Ahammaidhee / Soba
- Hamid Ali as Niyaz
- Chilhiya Moosa Manik as Sofa's father
- Jamsheedha Ahmed as Mariyam
- Ajwad as Aju
- Sithi Fulhu as Sithi Fulhu
- Suneetha Ali as maid
- Shakir
- Mohamed Fairooz as Ali

== Soundtrack ==
Track listing
No.	Title	Lyrics	Singer(s)	Length
1.	"Dheyshey Mithuraa"	Ahmed Riza (Tharaboozu)	Mohamed Rashad	03:40
2.	"Saahiba"	Hussain Sobah	Abdul Hannan Moosa Didi, Shifa Thaufeeq	06:07
3.	"Loabeegaa Vee Aniyaa"	Kaneeru Abdul Raheem	Umar Zahir	03:49
4.	"Thiya Nan Kiyaa Hoadhey"	Hussain Sobah	Ahmed Rasheedh, Shifa Thaufeeq	06:09
5.	"Reyrey Mithuraa"	Ahmed Riza (Tharaboozu)	Mohamed Rashad, Shifa Thaufeeq	03:27
6.	"Edheynee Dhiyunhey Roalaafaa"	Ahmed Riza (Tharaboozu)	Rafiyath Rameeza	03:14
