= Qurbaani (film) =

- Official film poster
- Directed by: Amjad Ibrahim
- Written by: Mariyam Moosa
- Produced by: Moosa Rushdi
- Starring: Yoosuf Shafeeu; Mariyam Nisha; Hussain Sobah
- Production company: Kathiriyaa Productions
- Release date: 1999
- Country: Maldives
- Language: Dhivehi

Qurbaani is a 1999 Maldivian comedy drama film directed by Amjad Ibrahim. Produced by Moosa Rushdi under Kathiriyaa Productions, the film stars Yoosuf Shafeeu, Mariyam Nisha and Hussain Sobah in pivotal roles.

== Cast ==
- Yoosuf Shafeeu as Shiyam
- Mariyam Nisha as Mariyam Nisha
- Hussain Sobah as Hussain Sobah
- Sithi Fulhu as Khadheeja
- Neena Saleem (Special appearance in the song "Handhaaneh Aavee Ey")

== Soundtrack ==
Track listing
No.	Title	Lyrics	Singer(s)	Length
1.	"Handhaaneh Aavee Ey"	Ahmed Sharumeel	Fazeela Amir, Ibrahim Amir
2.	"Vidhaa Handhaa Tharithah"		Mohamed Huzam
3.	"Baaghunne Fenilaa"		Fazeela Amir
4.	"Heylaa Hunnanveemaa Maafkurey"	Easa Shareef	Abdul Hannan Moosa Didi, Shifa Thaufeeq
5.	"Rey Rey Nunidhey"		Mohamed Huzam
6.	"Hureemey Feneythoa"	Boi Ahmed Khaleel	Abdul Hannan Moosa Didi, Fathimath Zoona
7.	"Karuthaa Fenun Hoadhi"		Ali Rameez
8.	"Hin'dhu Hin'dhukolhun Roveythee"	Easa Shareef	Mohamed Huzam

== See also ==
- Lists of Maldivian films
