= DhiTV =

Maldives TV channel

- Logo from 2008 to 2016
- Country: Maldives
- Broadcast area: Maldives, South Asia
- Headquarters: Malé, Maldives

Programming
- Languages: Dhivehi, English
- Picture format: 480i SD

Ownership
- Owner: Broadcasting Maldives Pvt Ltd
- Key people: Midhath Adam
- Sister channels: DhiFM (FM channel); DhiPlus (Formerly DhiFM Plus); D24

History
- Launched: 1 July 2008
- Founder: Champa Mohamed Moosa (Uhchu)
- Closed: 11 August 2016

Links
- Website: DhiTV Website

DhiTV was the first private TV channel of the Maldives to broadcast test signals and officially launch in the Maldives. It was inaugurated on 1 July 2008 by President Maumoon Abdul Gayoom. The channel is run by Broadcasting Maldives Pvt Ltd. Since the beginning DhiTV has captured the attention of viewers, and became one of the most watched local channels in the Maldives. Some of the major shows on DhiTV included its news bulletins, English talk-show Fourth Estate, Dhivehi talk-show Khabarutherein, Weekend Show, Sports Extra, and more. DhiTV brings Tharinge Rey in every Ramadan which actors/actresses and singers sing couple songs. DhiTV's transmission started at 2pm and ended at 12:30am; the rest of the time, it aired the transmission of DhiFM plus. Mostly DhiTV was known as an anti-MDP channel and a politics, news, and current affairs channel thus it shows entertainment and sports programs. It also brings meetings of political parties and coverage of other events.

Nawaal, who was at TVM before, was the CEO of DhiTV. Masood, famous presenter and Manager Customer Services of Dhiraagu, was a Director, who himself presents DhiTV's most popular and longest-running show. In 2014 this show has gone off-air.

Although DhiTV and DhiFM (first private radio station) are financed by Champa Mohamed Moosa and is operated in the same building, the two channels are operated separately by two different companies.

== Closure ==
The closure of the channel was abruptly announced to staff on Wednesday afternoon, just a day after the ruling Progressive Party of the Maldives dominated parliament approved a draconian law re-criminalising defamation. DhiFM, a radio station affiliated with the TV station, DhiFM plus, and the Dhivehi Online website were also shut down. A memo sent to staff at the radio and TV stations said that the network's parent companies, Broadcasting Maldives and Maldives Media Company, do not believe the channels “can be run in a sustainable manner under the current circumstances. ”Midhath Adam, DhiTV’s CEO, declined to comment. But people briefed on the closure said the decision was linked to the defamation law. “It is no longer safe to practice journalism,” an informed source said. DhiTV is mostly owned by tourism tycoon Mohamed Moosa, known as Champa Uchu. DhiTV and DhiFM responded to threat of action from the broadcast regulator by displaying an upside down picture of the chair of the Maldives Broadcasting Commission, Mohamed Shaheeb. In November 2012, the station's CEO was summoned to a parliamentary committee after MPs complained that it had aired defamatory content.

The transmission of the channel gone shutdown & DhiTV putted their final nail to coffin on 11 August 2016 & the official website of DhiTV existed until 24 October 2016. No reason for the closure was given.
