= Mariyam Nisha =

Maldivian actress (born 1979)

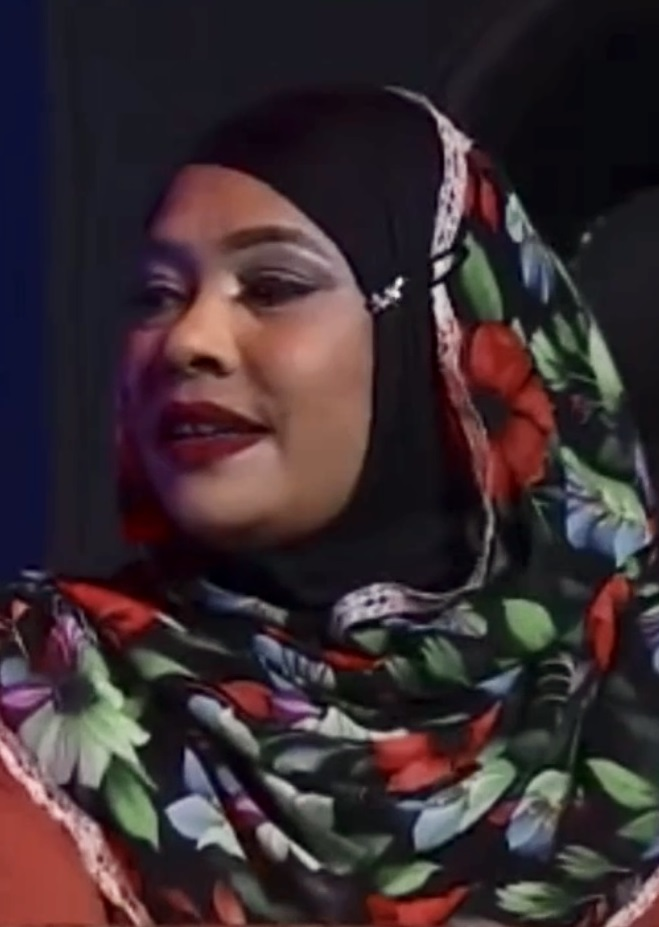
- Nisha at Olympus reopening ceremony, 2023
- Born: 19 May 1979 (age 47); Dh. Rinbudhoo, Maldives
- Occupation: Actress
- Years active: 1994–present
- Children: 6

Mariyam Nisha (born 19 May 1979) is a Maldivian actress.

== Early life ==
Mariyam Nisha was born on 19 May 1979 in Dh. Rinbudhoo. She recalls her childhood days as a "Disturbing chapter" of life where she had to refrain from enjoying time with friends due to a skin problem. At the age of twelve, she was married off and a year later, she had her first child at the age of thirteen.

== Career ==
=== 1994–1999: Early releases and Haqqu ===
At the age of fourteen, Nisha made her screen debut with the music video "Gendhanyaa Gendhavaashey" alongside Malik Mohamed. Featured in a television programme titled Mahrabu, the song was well received, topping several charts during the time of its release.

Nisha played the role of Hana Shareef, a young girl who has attracted two brothers, in Hussain Adil's comedy drama film Dhehithehge Loabi (1995) alongside Abdul Rahman Rauf and Ahmed Sharmeel. The film tells a story of two brothers who fall in love with the same girl, which causes rivalry and misunderstandings between them. She next appeared in Mohamed Shiyaz's Dhushman which features Hussain Sobah, Aminath Rasheedha and Hamid Ali in pivotal roles. In the film, she plays the role of Nisha, a rich girl who loses her boyfriend over social discrimination. The same year, she starred in the family drama Manzil which follows an intelligent and hardworking orphan, played by Aishath Shiranee, whose life turns a dramatic change while working as a servant in a reputed family.

In 1996, Yoosuf Rafeeu's award-winning film Haqqu was released which featured Nisha as Lamha, a promiscuous woman who falls in love with a married man. The film revolves around a man who is forced to marry a woman he dissents, stars Nisha, Reeko Moosa Manik and Mariyam Shakeela in lead roles. The film received positive reviews from critics and her performance fetched her a Gaumee Film Award for Best Actress.

In 1997, Nisha appeared alongside Hussain Sobah and Jamsheedha Ahmed as an established actress who sacrifices her career for an underprivileged talented vocalist in Amjad Ibrahim's Loabeege Aniyaa. The following year, she starred as a pampered child of a family trapped in a lie, in Hamid Ali's drama film Mila Handhuvaru (1998). She next starred as a hyper-active girl in Amjad Ibrahim's comedy drama film Qurbaani (1999) starring opposite Yoosuf Shafeeu and Hussain Sobah. The film was a financially successful project and was declared a Mega-Hit at the end of its run at cinema. She next starred opposite Hussain Sobah and Jamsheedha Ahmed in Fathimath Nahula's debut direction Fahuneyvaa (2000) which portrays the love-conflict of a man between a prominent stage performer and a deaf-mute poor girl. Nisha played the role of Fazeela, a deaf-mute girl and the wife who was abandoned for a rich and famous girl. Her performance and the film was critically appreciated by critics and was a Hit commercially by screening twenty six housefull shows at cinema.

=== 2000–05: Multiple releases and Zuleykha ===
In 2000, she played the role of Sofi, an unsympathetic young woman who mistreats her own mother and has an extra-marital affair with a womanizer in Abdul Faththaah's directorial debut, Himeyn Dhuniye which received positive reviews from critics. Besides, Nisha played the emotionally immature wife opposite Yoosuf Shafeeu in Amjad Ibrahim's comedy drama film, Majubooru Loabi (2000).

Nisha starred as Zeyna, an acquiescent wife in Fathimath Nahula's drama film Naaummeedhu (2000) which depicts the story of a happily married couple whose life is shattered into pieces when they unintentionally invite a seductive woman into their life. The film receiving favorable reviews from critics was able to screen twenty eight houseful shows at Olympus Cinema, making it the highest grossing Maldivian film of the year. It was followed by Ali Shameel's drama film Hithi Nimun (2001) featuring opposite Mohamed Shavin and Sheereen Abdul Wahid, which follows the storyline of a stubborn young man who abandons his girlfriend when he discovers about her pregnancy.

In 2002, Nisha featured alongside Yoosuf Shafeeu, Mariyam Nazima, Moosa Zakariyya and Ahmed Shimau in Shimau-directed family drama film Loabi Nuvevununama. Written by Fathimath Nahula, the story narrates the journey of a handicapped man who has been betrayed in love and unknowingly marries his brother's love interest. The film was a critical and commercial success. She next worked with Amjad Ibrahim for his horror film Sandhuravirey (2002) which narrates the story of a female jinn aiming to win the heart of a human being. Featuring Yoosuf Shafeeu and Nisha in lead roles, the film received poor reviews from critics. She played dual roles in the film; Yaasha, the jinn desperately trying to gain the love and trust of Dhiyash (played by Shafeeu) and Shafqa, the lookalike of Yaasha whom Dhiyas finally marries.

Nisha collaborated with Easa Shareef for a horror film Ginihila (2003) alongside Ali Seezan, Niuma Mohamed and Reeko Moosa Manik, playing the role of Sajuna, the forbearing wife who is pursued by a spirit and discovers her husband's extramarital affair with a psychopath girl. The film narrates the story of a young couple who decided to spend a romantic break to save their crumbling marriage and how events take a sinister turn when the wife experiences supernatural incidence which has her husband involvement in it. The film is an unofficial remake of Vikram Bhatt's Indian horror film Raaz (2002) featuring Bipasha Basu, Dino Morea, Malini Sharma and Ashutosh Rana which itself is an unofficial adaptation of What Lies Beneath.

Abdul Faththaah's horror film Eynaa was released in 2004, which appears Sheela Najeeb, Mohamed Manik, Ahmed Shah, Khadheeja Ibrahim Didi, Ibrahim Jihad and Nashidha Mohamed as six colleagues who go on a picnic to a haunted uninhabited island and their battle for survival. She played the pregnant wife of Nihan which was portrayed by Manik. The film garnered critical appreciation especially for its technical department and was a commercial success. Nisha reprised her role as Shafqa and Yaasha in Amjad Ibrahim's next directorial venture Sandhuravirey 2 (2004); a sequel to his 2002 horror film Sandhuravirey. Starring additional cast including Niuma Mohamed, Zeenath Abbas, Mohamed Shavin and Sheereen Abdul Wahid, the film follows a storyline of the daughter jinn avenging the death of its mother and sister on Dhiyash's family. Similar to its prequel, the film received negative response from critics.

Her only release of 2005 was another collaboration with Fathimath Nahula in the critically appreciated and commercially prosperous project, a romantic drama film Zuleykha (2005) which narrates the journey of a nine years old girl seeking the lost love of her mother. Featuring an ensemble cast including Sheela Najeeb, Yoosuf Shafeeu, Ali Seezan, Mohamed Manik and Mariyam Enash Sinan, Nisha played the titular role; a woman who volunteered to help a vulnerable father diagnosed with the last stage of cancer which fetched her a Gaumee Film Award nomination as the Best Actress. Thirty three housefull shows of the film were screened at the cinema making it the highest grossing Maldivian release of the year.

=== 2008–11: 14 Vileyrey and career breaks ===
In 2009, Nisha collaborated with Amjad Ibrahim for his horror film Baaraige Fas, cast alongside Hussain Sobah, Amira Ismail, Ali Shameel, Mariyam Shakeela and Ahmed Azmeel. The film follows a temptress vampire who goes into a killing spree to quench her thirst. The film received mainly negative reviews from critics though her performance fetched her only Maldives Film Award nomination as the Best Actress.

In 2011 Nisha played the role of Shaira, an irresponsible sister who hides her husband's dirty secret, in the Moomin Fuad-directed crime tragedy drama Loodhifa. Featuring an ensemble cast, the film deals with current social issues in the society told from different perspectives of the characters. Made on a budget of MVR 600,000, the film was declared a commercial failure though it received wide critical acclaim. Her performance received positive response from critics though some noted her talent was "misused" with the small screen time. However, Ahmed Nadheem from Haveeru had a different opinion and wrote: "In the long three hour movie, Nisha was featured for merely three minutes but she outshone the rest of actress with her strong performance. It was followed by a romantic horror film 14 Vileyrey, directed by Abdul Faththaah and starring Ali Seezan with Aishath Rishmy. Written by Ibrahim Waheed, the project faced controversy when the team of Kuhveriakee Kaakuhey? accused Fatthah of "purloining the plot" of the latter. The film and her performance received mixed to positive reviews from critics; "Apart from her over-girly dialogue delivery at the beginning of the movie, she did a great job with the passing of the movie with countless expressions and acting skill". The film did good business at box office and was declared a "Hit".

== Media image ==
In 2012, Nisha was ranked at the first position in the list of "Best Actresses in Maldives" compiled by Haveeru, where writer Ahmed Nadheem opined that Nisha is capable to "overshadow any actress with her presence".

== Filmography ==
Key
†	Denotes films that have not yet been released

=== Feature film ===
Year	Title	Role	Notes	Ref(s)
1995	Dhehithehge Loabi	Hana Shareef		
1995	Biru	Zeeniya	1st movie	
1995	Masthu			
1995	Dhushman	Nisha		
1996	Haqqu	Lamha	Gaumee Film Award for Best Actress	
1997	Loabeega Aniyaa	Sofa		
1998	Fahuneyvaa	Fazeela		
1998	Olhunuvi Hiyy	Sheeba		
1998	Mila Handhuvaru	Mariyam		
1999	Viraashaa	Nisha	Special Appearance in a song "Vanee Haas Neyvaa"	
1999	Qurbaani	Mariyam Nisha		
2000	Himeyn Dhuniye	Sofi		
2000	Shaalinee	Shaalinee		
2000	Majubooru Loabi	Shifna		
2001	Hithi Nimun	Nazima		
2001	Naaummeedhu	Zeyna		
2002	Loabi Nuvevununama	Lahufa		
2002	Sandhuravirey	Yaasha / Shafqa		
2003	Ginihila	Sajuna		
2003	Edhi Edhi Hoadheemey	Meeraa	Nominated—Gaumee Film Award for Best Actress	
2004	Sandhuravirey 2	Yaasha / Shafqa		
2004	Eynaa	Aani		
2005	Zuleykha	Zuleykha / Zul	Nominated—Gaumee Film Award for Best Actress	
2009	Baaraige Fas	Afeefa	Nominated—Maldives Film Award for Best Actress	
2011	Loodhifa	Shaira		
2011	14 Vileyrey	Saeedha		
2025	Sorry		Special appearance	
2026	Keevve? †	Basheera		

=== Television ===
Year	Title	Role	Notes	Ref(s)
1994	Manzil	Nazima	Main role	
1995	Dhiriulhumakee Mieebaa?	Ainthu	In the episode "Moandey"	
1996	Dhiriulhumakee Mieebaa?	Aisthu	In the episode "Check One"	
1997	Ummeedhu	Niusha	Main role	
1998	Kulheybeybe		Recurring role	
1998–1999	Aisha	Neena	Recurring role	
1999	Maafkuraashey	Mary	Main role; 3 episodes	
2000	Reysham	Zulfa	Main role; 22 episodes	
2006–2008	Hinithun Velaashey Kalaa	Zubeydha	Recurring role; 7 episodes	
2024	Badhalu	Raushan's mother	Main role in the segment "The End of Us"	
2025	Loaiybahtakaa	Mihad's sister	Recurring role; 2 episodes	
2026	JunJulaa	Zakiyya		

=== Short film ===
Year	Title	Role	Notes
2004	Keymaatu	Sanpaa	
2008	No Money Full Beggy	Herself	Special appearance in the song "Kathilee Reethi Nazarekey"

=== Other work ===
Year	Title	Writer	Screenplay	Notes	Ref(s)
2007	Tarzan		Yes	Children's short film	

== Accolades ==
Year	Award	Category	Nominated work	Result	Ref(s)
1996	2nd Gaumee Film Awards	Best Actress	Haqqu	Won	
2007	4th Gaumee Film Awards	Best Actress	Zuleykha	Nominated	
2007	4th Gaumee Film Awards	Best Actress	Edhi Edhi Hoadheemey	Nominated	
2011	1st Maldives Film Awards	Best Actress	Baaraige Fas	Nominated	
