= Niboo =

Maldavian drama film

- Directed by: Yoosuf Rafeeu
- Written by: Yoosuf Rafeeu
- Produced by: Yoosuf Rafeeu
- Starring: Yoosuf Rafeeu; Reeko Moosa Manik; Niuma Mohamed; Waleedha Waleed
- Cinematography: Mohamed Rasheed
- Edited by: Yoosuf Rafeeu
- Music by: Bukhari Films
- Production company: Bukhari Films
- Distributed by: Television Maldives
- Release date: 1996
- Country: Maldives
- Language: Dhivehi

Niboo is a 1996 Maldivian drama film directed by Yoosuf Rafeeu. The film stars Rafeeu and Reeko Moosa Manik in dual roles while Niuma Mohamed and Waleedha Waleed feature in pivotal roles. It is an unofficial remake of Angoor (1982) starring Sanjeev Kumar and Deven Verma in dual roles which is a remake of another Bollywood film Do Dooni Char (1968) which itself is an adaptation of 1963 Bengali language comedy film Bhrantibilas, that is based on Ishwar Chandra Vidyasagar's Bengali novel by the same name, which itself is based on Shakespeare's play The Comedy of Errors.

== Premise ==
The film is about two pairs of identical twins separated at birth and how their lives go haywire when they meet in adulthood. Saleem (Reeko Moosa Manik) is married to Shahidha (Waleedha Waleed) and Ali (Yoosuf Rafeeu) is married to Ameena. They all stay together with Shahidha's younger sister Muneera (Niuma Mohamed). They are then met with another Saleem and Ali which creates confusion among both parties.

== Cast ==
- Yoosuf Rafeeu as Ali (Dual roles)
- Reeko Moosa Manik as Saleem (Dual roles)
- Niuma Mohamed as Muneera
- Waleedha Waleed as Shahidha
- Roanu Hassan Manik as Hussain
- Ibrahim Rasheed as Mansoor
- Mariyam Shakeela as Saleema
- Fathimath Mufliha as Ameena

== Soundtrack ==
Track listing
No.	Title	Singer(s)	Length
1.	"Bey Ikhthiyaarugaathoa"	Mohamed Haneef, Raniyya	03:25
