= Thuhumathu =

1993 Maldivian film

- Directed by: Hussain Rameez
- Written by: Hussain Rameez; Hassan Khaleel
- Screenplay by: Hussain Rameez
- Produced by: Television Maldives
- Starring: Asad Shareef; Waleedha Waleed; Reeko Moosa Manik
- Cinematography: Mohamed Maniku
- Edited by: Hassan Khaleel
- Music by: Imad Ismail; Imthiyaz
- Production companies: Mapa; Television Maldives
- Release date: 1993
- Country: Maldives
- Language: Dhivehi

Thuhumathu is a 1993 Maldivian film directed by Hussain Rameez. Produced by Television Maldives in collaboration with Mapa, the film stars Asad Shareef, Waleedha Waleed and Reeko Moosa Manik in pivotal roles.

== Premise ==
Shareef (Asad Shareef), a hardworking teacher and headmaster of the school, has to visit Male' for an urgent work. Before returning to his island, he attends a music gig, invited by his friend, where the stage welcomes to a leading musician, Shifa Waleedha Waleed, much to his surprise. In a flashback, it is revealed that, years back, Shareef and Shifa bond at her musical concert. Few days later, Shareef proposes to Shifa while his friend, Nihadh (Reeko Moosa Manik) practices his lines to deliver his affections towards the same woman. Nihadh becomes heart-broken when he discovers that Shifa intends to marry Shareef, though he hides his tears with a smile on his face. Shareef gets a job as a headmaster from a nearby island, and he relocates to the island with Shifa after marrying her.

Few years later to their marriage, the couple is blessed with a daughter, Shifnan. Shifa retires as a musician and stays home as a housewife. One day, Nihadh visits them and convinces Shifa to continue her stage performance in the atoll in private to Shareef, to surprise him. She agrees to his terms, hoping it would prosper the couple with financial stability needed for Shareef to begin a business of his own. Their moments and gatherings were captured by a paparazzi, Joarey (Dhon Annaaru Rasheed), who brainwashes Shareef with half-baked narratives and pictures. His suspicions are confirmed as Shareef secretly follows his wife and friend to a guest house; allegedly planning their next music show. In rage, he throws her out of his house and forbids her from meeting their child. Minutes later, he gets an invitation to honor Shifa's next music show which proves him wrong but realizes that he has lost his love due to a false accusation.

Ten years later, in the present, Shareef apologizes to Shifa for his action and behavior. Shifa initially refuses to be with him though she later is unable to control her emotions as he brings forth their daughter's sentiments. Realizing that their daughter believes her mother is dead, they finally come to a mutual understanding and he brings her home as Shifnan's step-mother.

== Cast ==
- Asad Shareef as Shareef
- Waleedha Waleed as Shifa
- Reeko Moosa Manik as Nihadh
- Aishath Shiranee as Shareef's sister
- Yumna Yoosuf
- Ahamed Manik
- Dhon Annaaru Rasheed as Ali "Joarey" Jaufar
- Zaki
- Yoosuf Moosa
- Abdul Ghafoor
- Ibrahim Fazeel
- N.B Disanayaka
- Baby Inaya

== Soundtrack ==
Track listing
No.	Title	Singer(s)	Length
1.	"Vaane Dhiriulhumey Mithaa Hama"	Sofa Thaufeeq
2.	"Maadhan Hoadhaalaashey"	Abdul Rauf, Sofa Thaufeeq
3.	"Dhen Hoadhidhaane Tho Ey"	Muaviyath Anwar, Sofa Thaufeeq
4.	"Moona Dhelo Maa Reethee Ey"	Abdul Rauf, Sofa Thaufeeq
5.	"Mi Hithaamaigaa"	Muaviyath Anwar

== Reception ==
Upon release, the film received mixed reviews from critics, where the efforts of the actors were praised for attempting to deliver the emotion and sentiments with their characters, though the weak screenplay limits their scope.
