= Dhevana An'bi =

- Official film poster
- Directed by: Ibrahim Rasheed
- Written by: Abdulla Waheed
- Screenplay by: Abdulla Waheed
- Produced by: Hussain Rasheed
- Cinematography: Abdulla Shujau
- Edited by: Abdulla Shujau; Ahmed Ayaz Rasheed
- Music by: Mohamed Madheeh
- Production company: Farivaa Films
- Release date: 28 March 1994
- Country: Maldives
- Language: Dhivehi

Dhevana An'bi (trans: Second wife) is a 1994 Maldivian family drama film directed by Ibrahim Rasheed. Produced by Hussain Rasheed under Farivaa Films, the film stars Chilhiya Moosa Manik, Hassan Afeef and Mariyam Haajara in pivotal roles. Filming took place in Kochi, India and was released on 28 March 1994.

== Plot ==
Abdul Ghadir (Chilhiya Moosa Manik), a senior citizen, applies for a vacant accountant post at Hotel Santosh and meets the manager Shahid (Hassan Afeef). With an emotional talk, Ghadir gets confirmed with the job. Shahid inspires to develop his hotel and succeeds in securing a loan despite his lack of his experience in the industry. He falls in love with Bank Manager's daughter Shafiya (Mariyam Haajara). Upon meeting Ghadir she stormily moves out of office, recalling a prior incident of Ghadir begging Shafiya's step-mother Majidha (Arifa Ibrahim) and uncle Amjad (Hamid Ali) for a job. Witnessing Ghadir's loyalty and dedication towards him, Shahid gifted him a house.

Shafiya asks for forgiveness from Shahid and they reunite. In spite of Majidha's disagreement, Shafiya's father agreed for Shahid's proposal to marry Shafiya. With the influence of her step mother and uncle, disputes between Shahid and Shafiya arises leading them to separation. A romantic link builds between Mariyam and Shahid, which Shafiya disagree to believe. Gadhir being continuously discriminated for his social status, resigns from Shahid's hotel and leaves to another city with his daughter Mariyam. She gets sick and moves to another city, lying to her father saying she gets a job offer from a sewing company while insisting her father to stay there to look after the house.

Shahid gets a job from the same city where Mariyam resides and meets her with the house owner's son. Amjad sees them together and implies the kid is of Shahid and mariyam's. He breaks the news to Gadhir who gets a heart attack seeing Mariyam and Shahid together with a kid. Once the truth is revealed, Shafiya begged Shahid to come back together which he instantly declines.

== Cast ==
- Hassan Afeef as Shahid
- Lillian Saeed as Mariyam
- Mariyam Haajara as Shafiya
- Chilhiya Moosa Manik as Abdul Ghadir
- Arifa Ibrahim as Majidha
- Hamid Ali as Amjad
- Shahul Hameed

== Soundtrack ==
Track listing
No.	Title	Lyrics	Music	Singer(s)	Length
1.	"Hissaa Kuraashey Asaru Mithuraa Ey"	Easa Shareef	Abdulla Waheedh (Feeali)	Aminath Hussain	05:06
2.	"Thee Vaareyge Paree Eh Hey?"	Easa Shareef	Abdulla Waheedh (Feeali)	Abdulla Waheedh (Feeali)	04:01
3.	"Han'dhaan Vaathee Mi Bunanee"		Abdulla Waheedh (Feeali)	Abdulla Waheedh (Feeali)	03:20
4.	"Dheewaanaa Vee Naazuku"	Easa Shareef	Abdulla Waheedh (Feeali)	Abdulla Waheedh (Feeali)	03:10
