= Majubooru Loabi =

2000 Maldivian comedy drama film by Amjad Ibrahim

- Official film poster
- Directed by: Amjad Ibrahim
- Written by: Mariyam Moosa
- Screenplay by: Mariyam Moosa
- Produced by: Shiham Rasheed
- Starring: Yoosuf Shafeeu; Reeko Moosa Manik; Mariyam Nisha
- Cinematography: Golha Ayya; Hussain Adhil
- Edited by: Hussain Mauzoom; Golha Ayya; Hussain Adhil
- Music by: Muaviyath Anwar
- Production company: Motion Pictures
- Release date: 2000
- Running time: 161 minutes
- Country: Maldives
- Language: Dhivehi

Majubooru Loabi (English: forced love) is a 2000 Maldivian comedy drama film directed by Amjad Ibrahim. Produced by Shiham Rasheed under Motion Pictures, the film stars Yoosuf Shafeeu, Reeko Moosa Manik and Mariyam Nisha in pivotal roles. The film was an unofficial remake of K. Bapaiah's film Kasak (1992 film)

== Premise ==
Aisthu (Arifa Ibrahim) and Chilhiya Moosa Manik arrange their emotionally immature daughter's marriage with a successful young man, Naushad (Yoosuf Shafeeu). A heated argument arises between Shifna (Mariyam Nisha) and her father when she refuses to accept their proposal, which results in her father having a heart attack. Ultimately Shifna marries Naushad and they share uncomfortable moments together while learning their personalities. Meanwhile, Shifna has a secret affair with a goon, Shafiu (Reeko Moosa Manik) whom she tries to reform.

== Cast ==
- Yoosuf Shafeeu as Naushad
- Reeko Moosa Manik as Shafiu
- Mariyam Nisha as Shifna
- Ismail Hilmy
- Mariyam Rizla
- Chilhiya Moosa Manik as Shifna's father
- Arifa Ibrahim as Aisthu
- Sithi Fulhu as Sheela
- Haajara Abdul Kareem as Sheetha
- Mohamed Abdulla as Giritee
- Mariyam Ismail
- Shaufa Shiyam
- Liraaru Ahmed

== Soundtrack ==
Track listing
No.	Title	Lyrics	Singer(s)	Length
1.	"Annanenyaa Angaalaa"		Fazeela Amir
2.	"Mithuraae Furusatheh"	Adam Haleem Adnan	Umar Zahir
3.	"Neyvaage Therein"	Kopee Mohamed Rasheed	Umar Zahir, Shifa Thaufeeq
4.	"Mirey Gaathugaa Hurumey Yaaraa"		Mukhthar Adam, Fazeela Amir
5.	"Bune Anga Anga"		Mukhthar Adam, Shifa Thaufeeq
6.	"Vaigadha Vaan Fesheethaa Ey"		Ahmed Amir, Fazeela Amir
7.	"Mithuraae Furusatheh" (Female version)	Adam Haleem Adnan	Shifa Thaufeeq
