= Dhehithehge Loabi =

- Official film poster
- Directed by: Hussain Adil
- Written by: Ahmed Sharmeel
- Screenplay by: Ahmed Sharmeel; Hussain Adil
- Produced by: Hussain Rasheed
- Starring: Mariyam Nisha; Abdul Rahman Rauf; Ahmed Sharmeel
- Cinematography: Hussain Adil
- Edited by: Hussain Adil
- Production company: Farivaa Films
- Release date: April 25, 1995
- Country: Maldives
- Language: Dhivehi

Dhehithehge Loabi is a 1995 Maldivian comedy drama film directed by Hussain Adil. Produced by Hussain Rasheed under Farivaa Films, the film stars Mariyam Nisha, Abdul Rahman Rauf and Ahmed Sharmeel in pivotal roles. The film was released on 25 April 1995.

== Plot ==
Hana Shareef (Mariyam Nisha) is selected for the post of a computer trainee at an office, working under Asif (Abdul Rahman Rauf). His younger brother, Hussain "Imu" Amir (Ahmed Sharmeel) working at the same office, falls in love with her. Imu always complains to his parents for always discriminating the siblings; preferring Imu over Asif all the time. Meanwhile, Hana's mother Mareena (Sithi Fulhu) dates a married man, Hassan (Ajwad Waheed). Their secret relationship was exposed to his wife, Ruqiyya.

Asif, slowly starts liking Hana, unknown of her relationship with his brother. However, he finds out about their relationship. A friend, Saleem, influenced by a man who was fired by Asif, suggested to do a sorcery which would result in Imu hating Hana and Hana falling for Asif. He agrees and was handed an amulet which he keeps under Imu's pillow. Saleem informed Imu about his brother's affection towards Hana and his involvement in black magic. Upon discovering the amulet, Imu lashes out to Asif, throwing him out of the house. Saleem confessed his crime to Imu and notified that Asif had been diagnosed with tuberculosis. He apologised to Imu and died in the presence of whole family.

== Cast ==
- Mariyam Nisha as Hana Shareef
- Abdul Rahman Rauf as Asif
- Ahmed Sharmeel as Hussain Amir "Imu"
- Sithi Fulhu as Mareena
- Ajwad Waheed as Hassan
- Ibrahim Shakir as Rashid
- Zareena as Naeema

== Soundtrack ==
Track listing
No.	Title	Lyrics	Music	Singer(s)	Length
1.	"Ruhi Kuramey Aadhey"	Ahmed Sharumeel	Mohamed Rasheedh (Monus)	Umar Zahir, Shifa Thaufeeq	03:18
2.	"Bunedhen Mihen Thihan'dhaanugaa"	Ahmed Sharumeel	Mohamed Rasheedh (Monus)	Abdul Hannan Moosa Didi	03:15
3.	"Vedhaaneythoa"	Ahmed Sharumeel	Mohamed Rasheedh (Monus)	Umar Zahir	04:21
4.	"Loabi Mooney"	Ahmed Sharumeel	Mohamed Rasheedh (Monus)	Umar Zahir, Shifa Thaufeeq	02:36
5.	"Thadhuvee E Libey Aahun"	Ahmed Sharumeel	Mohamed Rasheedh (Monus)	Abdul Hannan Moosa Didi	03:15
6.	"Vaaloabi Meehey"	Ahmed Sharumeel	Mohamed Rasheedh (Monus)	Abdul Hannan Moosa Didi	02:51
Total length:					19:38
