= Imthihaan =

1993 Maldivian film

- Directed by: M.M. Hussain
- Written by: M.M. Hussain
- Screenplay by: M.M. Hussain
- Produced by: M.M. Hussain
- Starring: Reeko Moosa Manik; Mariyam Manike; Ali Shakir; Ahmed Khalid; Suneetha
- Cinematography: Hussain Mauzoom
- Production company: Academy of Amateur Acting
- Release date: 1993
- Country: Maldives
- Language: Dhivehi

Imthihaan is a 1993 Maldivian family drama film developed and directed by M.M. Hussain. The film stars Reeko Moosa Manik, Mariyam Manike, Ali Shakir, Ahmed Khalid and Suneetha in main roles.

== Premise ==
Saeedha (Mariyam Manike) an ambitious and old-fashioned lady, works as a teacher where her married life is viewed as an example from the outside. Saeedha's husband, Saleem (Ali Shakir) was offered a job as a headmaster from an island far away from the capital. His decision to accept the offer arises complications in their married life. After his departure, Saleem started drifting apart from his family insisting to spend some alone time. Meanwhile, Saeedha's daughter, Shaama (Suneetha), started having an affair with a womanizer, Mohamed Aslam (Ahmed Giyas) and slowly becomes de-attached from the studies and her family responsibilities while coming home late.

Upon learning Shaama and Aslam's affair, Saeedha despises their relationship to which Shaama reacts to quit her studies and marry Aslam instead. As life keeps testing her patience, Saleem informs her about his firm decision to divorce her and marry another woman. Shaama and Aslam finally get married and she becomes pregnant with their first child. Saeedha determines to accept the offer made by the young and modern school inspector, Jamaal (Reeko Moosa Manik) to lead the school based in a north atoll. She decides to relocate to that island to which Shaama has a different opinion. After the birth of their child, the couple faces several obstacles as Shaama lacks the assistance and help from her husband.

== Cast ==
- Reeko Moosa Manik as Jamaal
- Mariyam Manike as Saeedha; school teacher
- Ali Shakir as Saleem; Saeedha's husband
- Ahmed Khalid as Ashraf; Saeedha's brother
- Suneetha as Shaama; Saeedha and Saleem's daughter
- Ahmed Giyas as Mohamed Aslam
- Waleedha Waleed as Ameena
- Koyya Hassan Manik as Haidhar; secondary Mathematics teacher
- Leenaz as Shiyama; Ashraf's first wife
- Mohamed Waheed as school headmaster
- Shinaz Mohamed as Maseeh; Saeedha and Saleem's son
- Mariyam Haajara as Haajara
- Ibrahim Shakir
- Chilhiya Moosa Manik as a doctor

== Soundtrack ==
Track listing
No.	Title	Singer(s)	Length
1.	"Haasve Hiyy Molhivey"	Abdul Rauf, Moonisa Khaleel
2.	"Ramzuvi Kulavaru Araa Maley"	Mohamed Rashad, Sofa Thaufeeq
3.	"Dhin Thaazaa Dhivaanavee Asaru"	Mohamed Rashad, Sofa Thaufeeq
4.	"Hureemey Hureemey Aadhe Dhaan"	Abdul Rauf, Moonisa Khaleel
5.	"Hoadhaashey Vaanee"	Mohamed Rashad, Shafeeqa Abdul Latheef
6.	"Buneemey Vamey"	Imaadh Ismail, Shafeeqa Abdul Latheef

== Reception ==
Upon release, the film received mainly positive reviews from critics for its emotional elements and the performance of the cast for justifying the scope of each character.
