= TVM Qur'an =

Television channel in the Maldives

Coordinates: 4.1716°N 73.5104°E

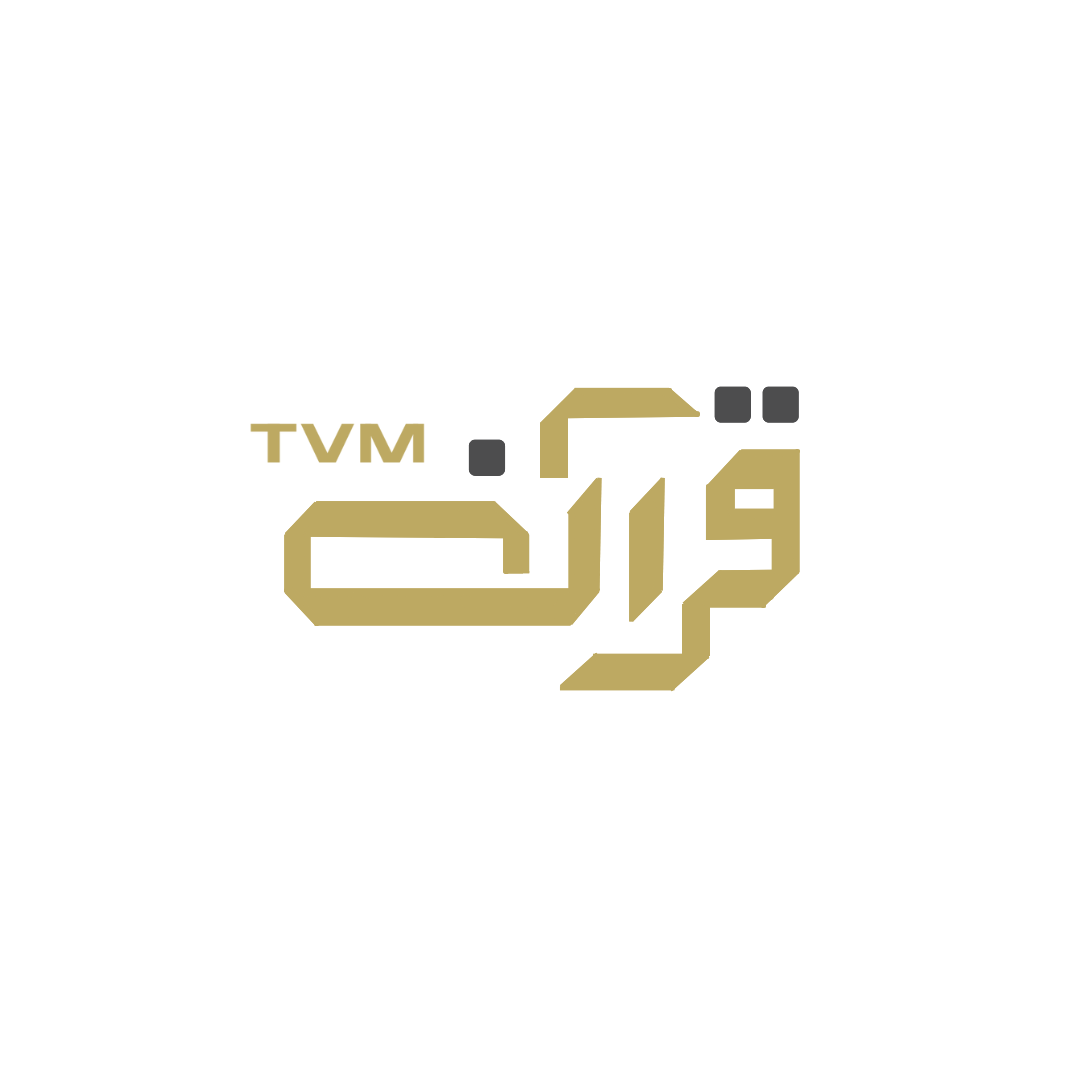
- Logo since 2023
- Country: Maldives
- Headquarters: Malé

Programming
- Languages: Dhivehi; Arabic
- Picture format: 480i SD

Ownership
- Owner: Public Service Media
- Sister channels: TVM; PSM News; Munnaaru TV; YES TV; Maldives TV

History
- Launched: 29 March 2023; 3 years ago

Availability

Terrestrial
- SSNET: 25

TVM Qu'ran is a Maldivian television channel broadcasting Quran.

== History ==
It was formed on March 29, 2023, by the former Minister of Islamic Affairs Dr. Ahmed Zahir on the occasiaion of Television Maldives's 45th Anniversary.

This channel only broadcasts Quran with English and Divehi translation.

This is the second Islamic religious channel that PSM launched, the first Islamic channel was Munnaaru TV that has launched on December 29, 2016, only shows Islamic-related content on Half-Day.
