= Beyvafaa =

- Official film poster
- Directed by: Ibrahim Rasheed
- Written by: Abdulla Rasheed; Hussain Rasheed
- Screenplay by: Hussain Rasheed
- Produced by: Hussain Rasheed
- Starring: Hussain Ali; Reeko Moosa Manik; Waleedha Waleed
- Cinematography: Abdulla Shujau
- Music by: Ahmed Muizzu
- Production company: Farivaa Films
- Release date: 1 January 1993
- Country: Maldives
- Language: Dhivehi

Beyvafaa is a 1993 Maldivian drama film directed by Ibrahim Rasheed. Produced by Hussain Rasheed under Farivaa Films, the film stars Hussain Ali, Reeko Moosa Manik and Waleedha Waleed in pivotal roles.

== Premise ==
Sharumeela (Waleedha Waleed), a blind orphan, intolerant of her tenants, moves out of the house she resides in. Mohamed meets Sharumeela and sympathizes for her disability and takes care of her where he later confesses his love for her. Mohamed shares his marriage plan to his father (Chilhiya Moosa Manik) who disowns him when he refuses to comply with his father's demands. Sharumeela and Mohamed marry and consult a doctor visiting from Japan. After a successful operation, Sharumeela gains her eyesight. Meanwhile, Mohamed's brother Suheil, who is married to Kaiydha (Sithi Fulhu) starts a romantic affair with an elder married-woman (Haajara Abdul Kareem).

== Cast ==
- Hussain Ali
- Reeko Moosa Manik as Manik/Solih
- Waleedha Waleed as Sharumeela
- Ahmed Riyaz
- Shadhiya as Shadhiya
- Abdulla Rasheed
- Ahmed Saleem
- Haajara Abdul Kareem
- Ahmed Suheil
- Sithi Fulhu as Kaiydha
- Chilhiya Moosa Manik as Mohamed's father

== Soundtrack ==
Track listing
No.	Title	Singer(s)	Length
1.	"Adhu Hithuga Hingaa Thiya Khiyaal"	Mohamed Rashad, Aathifa	03:26
2.	"Hiyy Neydheyey"

== Accolades ==
Award	Category	Recipients	Result
1st Gaumee Film Awards	Best Story	Hussain Rasheed, Abdullah Rasheed	Won
