= Vari (film) =

1993 Maldivian film

- Official film poster
- Directed by: Ahmed Sharumeel; Haajara Abdul Kareem
- Written by: Haajara Abdul Kareem
- Screenplay by: Ahmed Sharumeel; Hussain Adhil
- Produced by: Hussain Rasheed
- Starring: Ahmed Sharumeel; Ashiyath Zaheena; Mariyam Haajara; Fazeen Ahmed; Haajara Abdul Kareem; Hamid Ali
- Cinematography: Hussain Adhil
- Edited by: Hussain Adhil; Abdulla Sujau
- Music by: Hussain Adhil
- Production company: Farivaa Films
- Release date: 1 October 1993
- Country: Maldives
- Language: Dhivehi

Vari (English: divorce) is a 1993 Maldivian drama film written and co-directed by Haajara Abdul Kareem along with Ahmed Sharumeel. Produced by Hussain Rasheed under Farivaa Films, the film stars Ahmed Sharumeel, Ashiyath Zaheena, Mariyam Haajara, Fazeen, Haajara Abdul Kareem and Hamid Ali in pivotal roles. It was released on 1 October 1993.

== Plot ==
Abeeru, a dedicated yet emotionally distant mechanic, spends most of his time at the garage, leaving his wife, Sharoona, yearning for his affection. Despite being a loving mother to their two children, Sharoona struggles with the coldness in their marriage, which is further fueled by her mother, Sara, who has always despised the union. Seeing an opportunity, Abeeru's friend, Zahir, a notorious womanizer, schemes to win over Sharoona, gaining Sara's support in the process. Determined to break their marriage, Zahir fabricates stories of abuse, manipulating Sharoona into believing that Abeeru will never change. In a desperate move, Sara even offers herself to Zahir as a reward for ensuring the divorce, while Zahir continues to set his sights on Sharoona.

Meanwhile, Iqbal, a hardworking student employed at Abeeru's house, struggles with his own dilemma. He is hesitant to pursue a relationship with his colleague, Lailaa, fearing it will distract him from his studies. When Sharoona requests his company for a picnic with her children, he agrees despite the maid, Shareefa, warning him of potential consequences. Seizing the moment, Zahir takes photographs of Sharoona and Iqbal together and crafts a lie about an extramarital affair. With Sara's support, he spreads the rumor, igniting Abeeru's rage. Despite Majid, Sharoona's brother, overhearing Zahir's scheme and warning Sara, she refuses to back down. Eventually, Zahir presents the manipulated photographs to Abeeru, who, blinded by anger and betrayal, throws both Sharoona and Iqbal out of the house.

Sharoona finds solace at her mother's home, where Sara finally tends to her, believing she has successfully freed her daughter from an unloving marriage. However, Shareefa insists to Abeeru that something is amiss, urging him to seek the truth. Meanwhile, Majid confronts Sharoona, exposing Sara and Zahir's deception. But Sharoona, shattered and disillusioned, refuses to believe that her own mother would conspire against her happiness. As the lies spiral, the battle between love, trust, and manipulation reaches its breaking point, leaving everyone entangled in the consequences of their choices.

== Cast ==
- Ahmed Sharumeel as Abeeru
- Ashiyath Zaheena as Sharoona
- Mariyam Haajara as Lailaa
- Fazeen Ahmed as Iqbal
- Haajara Abdul Kareem as Sara; Sharoona's mother
- Hamid Ali as Zahir
- Musthafa as Majeed
- Waheedha as Shareefa
- Fauziyya as Fauziyya; Sara's neighbor
- Fathimath Sara
- Ahmed Shaan
- Ahmed Hameed
- Wujah Shaheem
- Shiyam
- Uzeyru
- Thuhthu Manike
- Suraj
- Ali Waheed

== Soundtrack ==
Track listing
No.	Title	Lyrics	Music	Singer(s)	Length
1.	"Dhen Loabeegaa Uzuru Veethoa"	Ahmed Sharumeel	Ahmed Riza	Abdulla Waheedh (Feeali), Sofa Thaufeeq
2.	"Vaa Loabi Nuvey Faraqu Dhehiyy"	Ahmed Sharumeel	Ahmed Riza	Abdulla Waheedh (Feeali), Sofa Thaufeeq
3.	"Dheefa Vidhun Bala Nayaavi Chaaloo"	Ahmed Sharumeel	Ahmed Riza	Abdulla Waheedh (Feeali), Sofa Thaufeeq
4.	"Magey Thagudheerugaa Haalathu"	Ahmed Sharumeel	Ahmed Riza	Sofa Thaufeeq

== Release and reception ==
The film was released on 1 October 1993. Upon release, the film mainly received mainly positive reviews from critics, for it narration, direction by Ahmed Sharumeel and Haajara Abdul Kareem, along with the performances of the lead and supporting actors.
