= Public Service Media (Maldives) =

- Type: State-owned
- Predecessor: Maldives Broadcasting Corporation; Maldives National Broadcasting Corporation
- Founded: 28 April 2015; 11 years ago
- Headquarters: Ameenee Magu, Malé, Maldives
- Key people: Ahmed Shakeeb (Managing director); Aminath Namza (Chairperson)
- Brands: PSM News; Yes TV; Television Maldives; TVM Qur'an; Dhivehi Raajjeyge Adu (Voice of Maldives); Dheenuge Adu; Dhivehi FM; Munnaaru TV; Maldives TV
- Website: psm.mv

Public Service Media (PSM) is the state-owned broadcaster of the Maldives. It was formed on 28 April 2015 following the ratification of the Public Service Media Act by President Abdulla Yameen.

== History ==
PSM was formed on 28 April 2015 under the Public Service Media Act (9/2015) after then-President Abdulla Yameen ratified the new bill, which journalists say that would undermine press freedom. The International Federation of Journalists condemned the new law calling it a 'state mouthpiece'.

Prior to PSM being the state media, its predecessor was the Maldives Broadcasting Corporation (MBC) created by President Mohamed Waheed Hassan Manik on 14 February 2012.

Prior to MBC being the state media, its predecessor was the Maldives National Broadcasting Corporation (MNBC) created by then-President Mohamed Nasheed on 22 December 2008.

== Brands ==
Currently there are 10 brands that PSM owns:

- PSM News
- Television Maldives (TVM)
- TVM Qur'an
- Dhivehi Raajjeyge Adu (Voice of Maldives)
- Dhivehi FM
- Yes TV
- Dheenuge Adu
- Munnaaru TV
- Maldives TV
