= Voice of Maldives =

Radio station in the Republic of Maldives

Dhivehi Raajjeyge Adu (Dhivehi: ދިވެހި ރާއްޖޭގެ އަޑު), historically known as the Voice of Maldives, is a radio station in the Republic of Maldives. Raajjé Radio, owned by the state, began broadcasting in 1962, under the name 'Male Radio'. It runs two radio channels, Voice of Maldives on 1449 kHz AM with a live internet stream (news and information) and Raajje FM (entertainment).

Voice of Maldives is the archipelago's official radio service, operating under the Ministry of Information Arts, and Culture. Voice of Maldives was renamed Maldives Island Broadcasting Service on 11 September 1966.

Voice of Maldives today has one broadcasting centre and two re-broadcasting centres. It covers 90% of the Maldives via Medium Wave transmission at 1449 kHz, with the remaining 10% being covered by small FM transmitters which are linked by satellite. It has one FM broadcasting service, with most transmissions being entertainment and music on 89 MHz, converting 30 kilometers from Malé. Voice of Maldives broadcasts 24/7, primarily Dhivehi language.

== History ==
Broadcasting in Maldives began on 29 December 1962 with a DIY spirit by hobbyists. "Malé Radio", equipped with locally crafted broadcasting equipments and without any knowledge of broadcasting, aired programmes for about five to ten minutes, with two minutes of news and current affairs. One year later, it was taken over by CINEMA Company, who renamed the service to "SENECO RADIO" with a new SW transmitter. Finally, in 1966, broadcasting became a government operated service, with the name, "Maldives Island Broadcasting Service", on 19 February 1967.

As the broadcasting gained more popularity, the government decided to move the broadcasting to a dedicated building on 26 June 1968. New technologies and its growing importance of the service led to a restructure and renaming as "Radio Maldives" on 16 February 1969. Since Maldives is a hundred percent Muslim nation, Radio Maldives began daily Dhivehi translations of Quran in 1970, a tradition that continues today.

One of the more popular programmes during those days was Radio Haveeru, dedicated to self improvement and public awareness. The late seventies was an important role in the history, it became more popular among the general public, and had to increase the time to allow 09 hours and 15 minutes daily for programmes which concentrated on music, and 02 and 1/2 hours daily dedicated to international news and music.

Radio Maldives was renamed Voice of Maldives by President Gayyoom on 19 January 1980. On 29 December 1981, the government secured a grant aid from the Australian Government which provided a 5-kilowatt medium-wave transmitter. With the increasing demand for radio, there was a need for a building expansion to cater for recording and production studios which gave way to a foundation for new building. This is the present Voice of Maldives building at Maafannu. As of 2014, the Voice of Maldives used a 10KW digital medium wave transmitter from Harris operating at 1449 kHz for its AM transmission.
