= Hamid Ali =

Maldivian director, producer, actor and writer

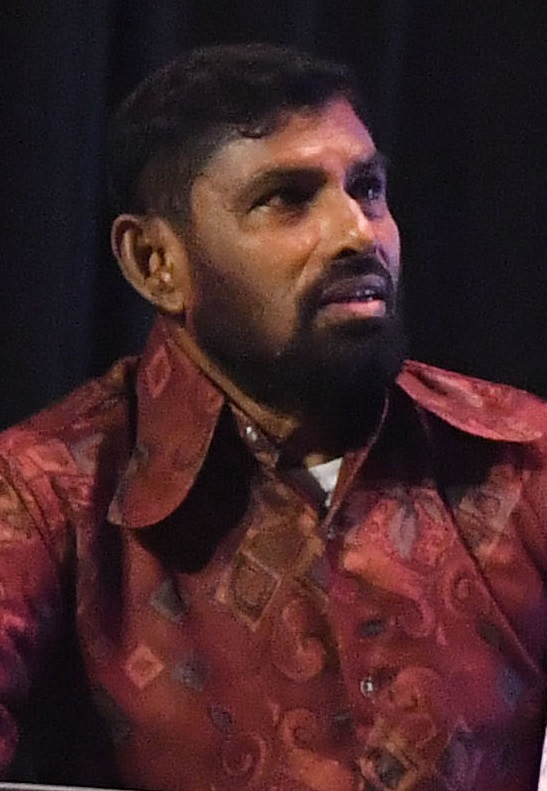
- Hamid attending Olympus reopening ceremony, 2023
- Occupations: Director, producer, actor and writer
- Years active: 1993–present

Hamid Ali is a Maldivian film director, producer, actor and writer.

== Career ==
In 1993, Hamid Ali starred in two films; Mithutu and Vari. The following year, he starred alongside Hassan Afeef, Arifa Ibrahim, Lillian Saeed and Mariyam Haajara in Ibrahim Rasheed's family drama Dhevana An'bi, in which he played a negative character, Amjad who separates a happy couple for enmity. The film revolves around a couple who gets separated due to social discrimination initiated by a cunning mother-in-law. In 1995, he wrote and starred in Mohamed Shiyaz's film Dhushman alongside Mariyam Nisha and Hussain Sobah. The following year, Ali released his drama film, Badhal, in which he starred alongside Hussain Sobah and Niuma Mohamed as a wealthy and pride businessman who is being duped in a series of events caused due to a misunderstanding by a "non-existent" twin.

Hamid Ali appeared alongside Hussain Sobah, Mariyam Nisha and Jamsheedha Ahmed as a producer and Romeo who is ready to go extreme extent to win his love in Amjad Ibrahim's Loabeega Aniyaa (1997). This was followed by his role a supportive friend in his film, Dhefirin opposite Hassan Afeef, Jamsheedha Ahmed and Asad Shareef. It marks the first Maldivian film that has been primarily shot in Sri Lanka. The following year, he directed, produced and wrote the film Mila Handhuvaru (1998) co-starring Mariyam Nisha and Mohamed Hassan which received mixed reviews from critics.

Yoosuf Shafeeu directed horror film Edhathuru was released in 2004 which appears Mohamed Shavin, Sheeren Abdul Wahid, Ali Ahmed, Lufshan Shakeeb, Fathmath Neelam, Nadhiya Hassan, Ibrahim Sobah and Yoosuf Solih as eight friends who go on a picnic to a haunted uninhabited island and their battle for survival. The film garnered critical appreciation specially for its sound effect and was a commercial success.

In 2008, Ali appeared in a small role in Fathimath Nahula's romantic drama film, Yoosuf which depicts the story of a deaf and mute man (played by Yoosuf Shafeeu) who has been mistreated by a wealthy family, mocking his disability. Featuring an ensemble cast including Yoosuf Shafeeu, Niuma Mohamed, Sheela Najeeb, Ahmed Nimal, Fauziyya Hassan, Ravee Farooq, Zeenath Abbas and Ahmed Lais Asim, the film received widespread critical acclaim and was attained a blockbuster status at box office.

In 2009, Hamid was cast as a hardworking father who experiences some unexplained supernatural activities in Amjad Ibrahim's romantic horror film Udhabaani featured alongside Yoosuf Shafeeu, Amira Ismail and Aminath Shareef. Upon release, the film received mixed reviews from critics thought it performed well at box office, making it Ibrahim's most successful venture.

In 2010, Ali starred in Abdul Fahtah's horror film Jinni alongside Ali Seezan and Mariyam Afeefa. Based on true incidents that occurred in an island of Maldives, he played the role of a spell-maker. Prior to release the film was marketed to be full of "suspense and uniqueness" compared to other mediocre Maldivian horror films. Upon release, the film received mixed reviews from critics; majority of them complaining for having the "same old feeling" of prior horror flicks though the performance were noted to be satisfactory. Despite the mixed reviews, the film witnessed a positive response at the box office, screening a total of twenty two housefull shows in Male', declaring it as a Mega-Hit.

Ali released his sixth direction, a family drama Laelaa produced and written by Ali and starring Yoosuf Shafeeu and Amira Ismail in lead roles. The film revolves around two daughters who were forced to arranged marriage by their parent. His screenplay and direction received negative response from critics; "Laela is too slow and dragged, some scenes get too lengthy leaving the audience yawning at boredom. The story is predictable and lacks reality". The film was declared a flop at box office.

== Filmography ==
Key
†	Denotes films that have not yet been released

=== Feature film ===
Year	Title	Role	Notes	Ref(s)
1993	Mithuru			
1993	Vari	Zahir		
1994	Dhevana An'bi	Amjad		
1995	Dhushman	Hamid	Also the writer	
1996	Yatheem		Special appearance	
1996	Badhal	Wafir	Also the director and writer	
1997	Loabeega Aniyaa	Niyaz		
1997	Dhefirin	Junaid	Also the director	
1998	Mila Handhuvaru	Hamid	Also the director and writer	
1998	Dhauvaa	Seema's Doctor	Special appearance	
2004	Sandhuravirey 2	Doctor	Special appearance	
2004	Edhathuru	Hamid		
2008	Yoosuf	Yasir's friend		
2009	Udhabaani	Adamfulhu	Also the producer	
2010	Jinni	Spell-maker	Special appearance	
2011	Hafaraaiy	Maajidh		
2011	Laelaa	Ahamma	Also the director, producer and writer	
2013	Fathis Handhuvaruge Feshun 3D	Hassana		
2019	Kaaku?	Ayyoob		
2024	Udhabaani 2	Moosafulhu	Also the producer	
2025	Koss Gina Mistake	Hamza		

=== Television ===
Year	Title	Role	Notes	Ref(s)
1994	Inthizaaru	Nadhir		
1998	Un'hoo Thakuraa	Zahir	Teledrama	
2000	Kashithanmathi	Saleem	Teledrama	
2004	Kamana Vareh Neiy	Aadhanu	Main role; 4 episodes	
2005	Baiveriyaa	Amir	Recurring role; 3 episodes	
2008	Soora	Fuwad	Recurring role; 5 episodes	
2009	Mihithah Loabi Dheyshey	Jaufar	Recurring role; 7 episodes	
2021	Aharenves Loabivey	Seytu	Main role (season 2); 7 episodes	
2022	Rimsha	Qadir	Main role; 13 episodes	
2023	Yaaraa	Customer	Guest role; "Episode 1"	
2025	Hiy Kalaayah Edheythee			
2026	Barudhaasthu †	Rasheed	Main role	

=== Short film ===
Year	Title	Role	Notes
2006	Ereyge Fahun	Najfa's father	
2007	Jinneenge Dharubaaru	Sabrang / Arnaas / Kahurab	Also the producer and writer
2007	Nudhaashe Dhookohfaa Loabivaa	Thuhthu	
2007	Kudafoolhaai Paree Dhahtha	Gaagan'du Hamid	
2007	Kuri Inthizaaruge Nimun	Umar	
2007	Kurafi Dhaadha	Gaagan'du Hamid / Bopman	
2008	Girlfriend		
2009	Santhi Mariyan'bu 3	Mudhimbe	
