= Reeko Moosa Manik =

Maldivian actor, politician, and businessman

Moosa Manik
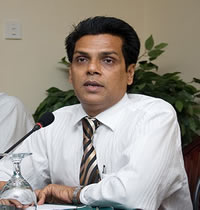
- Moosa in 2010

Deputy Speaker of the People's Majlis
- In office 28 May 2014 – November 2018
- President: Abdulla Yameen
- Preceded by: Ahmed Nazim
- Succeeded by: Eva Abdulla

Member of the People's Majlis
- In office 28 May 2014 – 29 April 2019
- Preceded by: Himself
- Constituency: Hulhuhenveiru
- In office 28 May 2009 – May 2014
- Succeeded by: Himself
- Constituency: Hulhuhenveiru

Personal details
- Born: 9 February 1961 (age 65)
- Party: Maldivian Democratic Party (2004–2014; (Note: He was expelled in 2014 but the parliament officially removed him from MDP's PG in 2017) 2022–present)
- Other political affiliations: Progressive Party of Maldives (2017–2022)
- Occupation: Actor, politician
- Nickname: Reeko Moosa Manik

Moosa Manik (born 9 February 1961) also known as Reeko Moosa Manik is a Maldivian entrepreneur and former actor and politician. He also served as the deputy speaker of the Maldives Parliament, and former chairman of the Maldivian Democratic Party. He was a member of parliament Hulhuhenveiru constituency.

== Political career ==
Manik first entered politics when he got elected as the MP for Hulhuhenveiru constituency in the 2009 elections in the 17th People's Majlis for the Maldivian Democratic Party.

In 2011, Manik was elected by the MDP National Council to be the acting chairperson of MDP for a year.

Manik was re-elected following the 2014 elections for the same constituency and ran for the position of Deputy Speaker of the People's Majlis, which he later got elected.

In 2014, Manik was expelled from MDP for violating the PG group's three-line whip in three votes in the parliament. Although the parliament officially removed him from MDP's PG in 2017.

Manik later joined the Progressive Party of Maldives after he was removed from MDP's PG. Manik later left PPM citing concerns about the party's leadership. Manik later on re-joined the MDP in 2022.

Manik originally planned on running for the 2019 elections, but later on dropped out.

== Private business and acting ==
Manik and his family own Heavy Load Private Limited, a company based in the Maldives which is primarily involved in island reclamation and harbor development works. Under his chairmanship in the company, Heavy Load Private Limited was awarded major government projects including a US$21 million (Rf269.8 million) reclamation project to reclaim 130 hectares from Thilafushi lagoon and Emboodhoo. Major projects awarded were forwarded to Maldives Anti corruption Commission, including Thilafushi reclamation project.

== Filmography ==
=== Feature film ===
Year	Title	Role	Notes
N/A	Ihthifaaq		
N/A	Loabi Vevidhaane		
1991	Loabeege Thoofan	Akram	
1992	Naseebu		
1993	Imthihaan	Jamaal	
1993	Beyvafaa	Manik / Solih	
1993	Ihsaas	Nasheedh	
1993	Thuhumathu	Nihadh	
1994	Dheriyaa	Naasif	
1995	Biru		
1996	Haqqu	Shahidh (Shaadu)	Gaumee Film Award for Best Actor
1996	Edhuvas Hingajje	Imran	
1996	Nibu	Saleem	Double role
1997	Heelaiy	Shah Naseer	
1997	Fathis Handhuvaru	Jina	
1998	Dhauvaa	Mohamed Areesh	
1998	Sirru	Rilwan	
1999	Umurah	Dr. Riyaz	
2000	2000 Vana Ufan Dhuvas	Vishan	
2000	Majubooru Loabi	Shafiu	
2000	Naaummeedhu	Ayaz	
2000	Emme Fahu Dhuvas	Atheef	
2003	Ginihila	Hakeem	
2004	Hatharu Udhares	Naseem	
2011	E Bappa	Moosa	Special appearance
2024	Lasviyas	Mahir	
2026	Keevve? †	Siraj	

=== Television ===
Year	Title	Role	Notes
1993	Dhanmalhi	Idhurees	Teledrama
1993	Gundolhi	Moosanik	Main role
1994	Dhanthura	Idhurees	Main role; 1 episode
1994	Haalathu		Main role; 1 episode
1994	Inthizaaru	Naadhiru	Main role; 13 episodes
1994	Furusathu	Moosafulhu	Main role
1997-1999	Kahthiri	Kaamil	Main role

=== Short film ===
Year	Title	Role	Notes
2020	KKB: Kuda Kuda Baaru	Jina	

== Accolades ==
Year	Award	Category	Nominated work	Result	Ref(s)
1994	Aafathis Awards - 1993	Best Actor	Naseebu	Nominated	
1995	Aafathis Awards - 1994	Best Actor	NA	Won	
1995	Aafathis Awards - 1994	Best Supporting Actor	NA	Won	
1995	1st Gaumee Film Awards	Best Supporting Actor	Ihsaas	Won	
1997	Aafathis Awards - 1996	Best Actor	Haqqu	Won	
1997	2nd Gaumee Film Awards	Best Actor	Haqqu	Won	
1997	National Award of Recognition	Performing Arts - Acting		Won	
1998	Aafathis Awards - 1997	Best Actor	Fathis Handhuvaru	Won	
2007	3rd Gaumee Film Awards	Best Actor	Fathis Handhuvaru	Nominated	
