= Television Maldives =

Television channel in the Maldives

Coordinates: 4.1716°N 73.5104°E

- Logo since 2013
- Country: Maldives
- Headquarters: Malé

Programming
- Languages: Dhivehi; English
- Picture format: 720i HD

Ownership
- Owner: Public Service Media
- Sister channels: PSM news Munnaaru TV; YES TV; Maldives TV; TVM Qur'an

History
- Launched: 29 March 1978; 48 years ago
- Former names: MNBC One (2010–2012)

Availability

Terrestrial
- Medianet: 103
- SSNET: 4

Television Maldives (TVM) is the public service broadcasting TV channel of the Maldives. It was formed on 29 March 1978.

== History ==
The station started broadcasting on 29 March 1978 to a very limited audience, 90 television sets around the capital Malé. The station broadcast on VHF channel 7 with an ERP of 1KW. In 1994, a second channel, TVM Plus, started broadcasting, which relied upon subscriptions. By the 2000s, the Maldives had more than 60,000 television sets and TVM Plus was available in close to 2,000 households. Until the launch of DhiTV in 2008, TVM held a virtual monopoly on local television. During the monopoly, TVM was known for its lack of quality, frequent censorship of pirated foreign content and incoherences caused from such censorship practices, as well as its views in favour of Maumoon Abdul Gayoom. However, local productions were praised for their quality.

The amount of religious programmes increased during Ramadan in 2006, cutting the entertainment output for the duration of the month.

In 2009, the management of Television Maldives (TVM) and national radio, Dhivehiraajjeyge Adu was handed over to newly formed Maldives National Broadcasting Corporation (MNBC). Following this, in 2010, TVM was rebranded as MNBC One, and Dhivehiraajjeyge Adu [Voice of Maldives] was renamed as Raajje Radio. Maldives National Broadcasting Corporation (MNBC) recently rebranded the name of Television Maldives (TVM) to "MNBC One." Under the rebranding process, the company also changed the name of Voice of Maldives (VOM) to "Raajje Radio." The move came days after Maldives Broadcasting Corporation (MBC) formed under Maldives Broadcasting Corporation Act announced that all the assets, employees, and land used by state media organisations belong to the company and MNBC was using the assets against law. Maldives Broadcasting Corporation (MBC) filed a lawsuit in Civil Court against Finance Ministry to procure assets, money, and employees of Television Maldives (TVM) and Voice of Maldives (VOM), at then rebranded to MNBC One and Raajje Radio.

In late 2009, MNBC launched "Youth TV", a half-day television channel that airs in the evening. This channel is aimed at the teens and youth of the Maldives. The channel is no longer airing.

After the resignation of President Mohamed Nasheed, a group of police officers with many from public have taken the MNBC Station on a court order. Soon after VTV feed was aired on the frequency. Later that day the Channel was renamed to TVM, although the radio channel kept the Raajje Radio name.

As of 8 February 2012, the station became a public service broadcaster, under the umbrella of Maldives Broadcasting Corporation (MBC). In December 2012, the Intelligence Bureau of India flagged Television Maldives as a "hate channel" allegedly broadcasting anti-India programming. It was one of the twenty-four "illegal" channels to have been flagged.

The channel carried UEFA Euro 2012 matches, sublicensed from Medianet.

On 30 March 2015, a bill was sent to the People's Majlis to dissolve MBC and establish a new company to run state media, named Public Service Media or PSM for short. One of the purposes of PSM stated in the bill is to develop and sustain under expense of state budget new media, broadcasting devices, print media and all other technologies that provide news, information, awareness and entertainment. And also remaining as national media that is impartial to influence with editorial independence with nationwide coverage under the common regulations and policies within the law.

On 28 April 2015, President Abdulla Yameen Abdul Gayoom ratified the Public Service Media Bill, making PSM the official state media company. Following the ratification, seven individuals were nominated to the Public Service Media Governing Board by the president on 29 April 2015.

== Channels ==
Television Maldives has 6 television channels and 3 radio channels:

Television

- Television Maldives
- PSM news
- Munnaaru TV
- Yes Tv (Maldives)
- Maldives TV
- TVM Qur'an

Radio

- Dhivehi Raajjege Adu
- Dhivehi FM
- Dheenuge Adu

== Events ==
The following events are broadcast by Television Maldives:

Football

- Dhivehi League
- President's Cup
- Maldivian FA Charity Shield
- Maldives FA Cup
- SAFF Championship

International

- FIFA World Cup
- UEFA Euro
- FIFA Club World Cup (Since 2011)
- Copa America (Since 2015)
