= Kan'bulo =

2025 Maldivian film

- Official film poster
- Directed by: Hussain Munawwar
- Written by: Yashfa Abdul Ghanee
- Screenplay by: Mahdi Ahmed
- Produced by: Ali Shaniz Mohamed; Hussain Munawwar
- Starring: Ismail Rasheed; Mariyam Azza; Ahmed Nimal; Sheela Najeeb; Ahmed Easa; Washiya Mohamed; Mariyam Shakeela
- Cinematography: Ibrahim Wisan
- Edited by: Abdulla Muaz; Ahmed Nimal
- Music by: Ahmed Imthiyaz
- Production companies: Kid Production; Saturn Studio
- Release date: 31 August 2025
- Country: Maldives
- Language: Dhivehi

Kan'bulo is a 2025 Maldivian romantic drama film directed by Hussain Munawwar. Co-produced by Munawwar and Ali Shaniz Mohamed under Kid Production and Saturn Studio, the film stars Ismail Rasheed, Mariyam Azza, Ahmed Nimal, Sheela Najeeb, Ahmed Easa, Washiya Mohamed and Mariyam Shakeela in pivotal roles.

Based on true events, the film depicts the domestic abuse of women and children by those meant to protect them, and the lasting impact of these sufferings on their married lives. Filming took place in HDh. Nolhivaranfaru and HDh. Kulhudhuffushi. The film was released on 31 August 2025.

== Premise ==
The film follows a young woman who has endured domestic abuse and embarks on a determined journey to seek justice. Confronting a system burdened by influence and corruption, she fights to reclaim her voice, her dignity and her future.

== Cast ==
- Ismail Rasheed as Umar
- Mariyam Azza as Maya
- Ahmed Nimal as Rauf
- Sheela Najeeb as Nafeesa
- Ahmed Easa as Ariz
- Washiya Mohamed as Maree
- Mariyam Shakeela as Zaheena
- Aishath Laiba Luthfy as Ainee (special appearance)
- Hussain Hazim (special appearance)

== Production ==
=== Development ===
Director Hussain Munawwar had initially planned to take a five-year break after completing Kamanaa (2024) before pursuing another project. However, following the success of Kamanaa, he decided to begin work on a new film and started exploring potential stories. His wife, Rishfa Abdul Samad—who also served as makeup director and costume designer—suggested producing a comedy, but Munawwar chose to focus on a socially relevant theme. Samad then introduced him to the novel Yuktha (2009), written by Yashfa Abdul Ghanee, which had won first place at the National Long Story Competition and was based on real-life incidents. Believing the story could inspire society if adapted for the mainstream, she agreed to grant Saturn Studio the rights for a feature film adaptation.

Munawwar brought screenwriter Mahdi Ahmed on board to develop the script, with several changes made during the adaptation process. Among them was altering the age of the protagonist, Maya, from thirteen to sixteen, as Munawwar was hesitant to portray such intense suffering through a younger character. As a result, Mariyam Azza was cast to play the younger version of Maya at age sixteen. During creative discussions, the team decided to rename the main character from “Yuktha” to “Kan'bulo,” as the original name was considered difficult to pronounce. Consequently, the title of the film was changed to Kan'bulo.

=== Casting ===
For casting, Hussain Munawwar sought assistance from Rishfa to finalize the lineup. Her first choice for the lead role was Mariyam Azza, whom she firmly supported following her performance in Kamanaa (2024). According to Rishfa, selecting an actress for Maya was the most challenging task, as the character needed to be convincingly portrayed across a five-year time gap. Makeup artist Hussain Hazim joined the crew to handle the special effects makeup required to present Azza as a sixteen-year-old schoolgirl.

Ahmed Nimal was the second actor to be cast, as Munawwar believed his prior portrayal of a similar role in another film made him the definitive choice for this character. Similarly, Ismail Rasheed was selected to play the abuser, given the parallels between this role and his performance as Ahammaa in Munawwar’s directorial debut Sazaa (2011). Kan’bulo also marked the second collaboration between Rasheed and Azza, following their appearance together in the short film series Farihibe (2008). Rasheed himself described Azza’s performance in Kan’bulo as a "significant improvement" over her earlier work.

The project was officially announced on 31 May 2025 under the title Kan’bulo, with the main cast including Ismail Rasheed, Mariyam Azza, Ahmed Nimal, Sheela Najeeb, Ahmed Easa, Washiya Mohamed and Mariyam Shakeela. Washiya Mohamed, eager to collaborate with Munawwar, accepted her role without reading the script. The film also marked the second collaboration between Munawwar and Shakeela after the crime tragedy Loodhifa (2011). In Kan’bulo, Sheela Najeeb portrays Maya's mother, a victim of domestic abuse. Najeeb agreed to the role upon learning she would be working alongside Ismail Rasheed, marking her first on-screen collaboration with him as well as her first project under Munawwar’s direction.

== Soundtrack ==
The background score and soundtrack of the film were composed by Ahmed Imthiyaz, while the melodies for all songs were created by Mohamed Abdul Ghanee. Ghanee initially worked on two songs that reflected the overall narrative of the film and conveyed the emotions of the child character. The title track was composed later, after filming had been completed, as both Munawwar and Ghanee preferred to develop it by watching the completed scenes to capture the full emotional depth of the characters. Playback singers for the soundtrack include Ghanee, Mariyam Ashfa, Rafiyath Rameeza and Ahmed Lais.

Track listing
No.	Title	Lyrics	Music	Singer(s)	Length
1.	"Mi Libunu Sazaa Akee"	Mohamed Abdul Ghanee	Ahmed Imthiyaz	Rafiyath Rameeza, Mohamed Abdul Ghanee
2.	"Vaanan Ekeegaa Vaanan"	Mohamed Abdul Ghanee	Ahmed Imthiyaz	Ahmed Lais, Mariyam Ashfa
3.	"Konfadha Veynehhey"	Mohamed Abdul Ghanee	Ahmed Imthiyaz	Mariyam Ashfa
4.	"Heeveyey"	Mohamed Abdul Ghanee	Ahmed Imthiyaz	Mariyam Ashfa, Hajar Amelia Binth Nihaz

== Release and reception ==
The film was theatrically released on 31 August 2025.
