= Maayoos =

- Written by: Ajunaz Ali
- Directed by: Ajunaz Ali
- Starring: Niuma Mohamed; Ismail Rasheed; Mohamed Jumayyil
- Music by: Ayyuman Shareef
- Country of origin: Maldives
- Original language: Dhivehi
- No. of seasons: 1
- No. of episodes: 13

Production
- Producer: Baiskoafu
- Cinematography: Moomin Fuad
- Editors: Moomin Fuad; Ahmed Asim
- Production company: A T for 2 Productions

Original release
- Release: 14 November 2019 – 14 February 2020

Maayoos (English: depressed) is a 2019 Maldivian romantic web series written and directed by Ajunaz Ali. The series stars Niuma Mohamed, Ismail Rasheed and Mohamed Jumayyil in lead roles. The series narrates the consequences when a married woman finds her contentment in a younger companion, who is blood-related to her husband.

== Cast ==
- Niuma Mohamed as Asma
- Ismail Rasheed as Ibrahim Shakir
- Mohamed Jumayyil as Amir
- Ajunaz Ali as Zahid
- Mohamed Waheed as Adam
- Mariyam Haleem as Hareera
- Mariyam Majudha
- Azuma Abdul Rahman
- Hayyaan Hameed
- Abdul Hameed Usman
- Mohamed Faisal
- Ahmed Nizam
- Abdulah Fayaz
- Hassan Rasheed
- Hassan Hameed
- Ahmed Adam
- Ali Shazleem as Shakir's physician

== Episodes ==
No. in season	Title	Directed by	Original release date
1	"Episode 01"	Ajunaz Ali	November 14, 2019
Asma (Niuma Mohamed) resides in a nearby island, working as a primary school teacher. She grows closer to a fisherman, Ismail Shakeer (Ismail Rasheed) with whom her first meeting ends with a quarrel.
2	"Episode 02"	Ajunaz Ali	November 20, 2019
Asma is revealed to be sexually abused someone living in her house. Hence, she moves out of the house and marries Shakir. A few years later, they relocate to Shakir's born island with their child, Suheil.
3	"Episode 03"	Ajunaz Ali	November 26, 2019
4	"Episode 04"	Ajunaz Ali	December 4, 2019
5	"Episode 05"	Ajunaz Ali	December 11, 2019
6	"Episode 06"	Ajunaz Ali	December 17, 2019
7	"Episode 07"	Ajunaz Ali	December 24, 2019
8	"Episode 08"	Ajunaz Ali	December 31, 2019
9	"Episode 09"	Ajunaz Ali	January 14, 2020
10	"Episode 10"	Ajunaz Ali	January 14, 2020
11	"Episode 11"	Ajunaz Ali	January 21, 2020
12	"Episode 12"	Ajunaz Ali	February 12, 2020
13	"Episode 13"	Ajunaz Ali	February 14, 2020

== Development and release ==
Following the critical success of Ingili (2013), screen-writer Mahdi Ahmed announced the project in 2013 and was scheduled for a 2014 theatrical release. However, the film made on a budget of MVR 3,000,000 was delayed indefinitely due to several issues in post-production. After six years, Baiskoafu re-launched the project on its first anniversary. The first episode of the series was streamed on 14 November 2019. A total of thirteen episodes were released, where the series finale was streamed on 14 February 2020.

== Soundtrack ==
Track listing
No.	Title	Lyrics	Music	Singer(s)	Length
1.	"Maayoos"	Ali Mihad	Suresh, Ibba	Mohamed Farhad
