= Aishath Rasheedha =

Maldivian actress and businesswoman (died 2019)

- Died: November 13, 2019
- Occupations: Actress, businesswoman
- Years active: 2003–2017

Aishath Rasheedha was a Maldivian film actor and a businesswoman. She was commonly known for her comic roles in advertisements and Yoosuf Rafeeu's comedy drama series Dhiriulhumakee Meebaa?.

== Career ==
=== As an actor ===
Rasheedha is most prominently known for her comic roles in Yoosuf Rafeeu's television comedy series Dhiriulhumakee Meeba? in which she appeared in several episodes of the series throughout its run. In 2006, she collaborated with Abdul Faththaah for his romantic drama series Hinithun Velaashey Kalaa in which she played the role of a gentle and caring mother yearning the love of her son. Apart from that she appeared in several shot films including children's horror short film series Vasvaas and the short horror thriller Fahu Sofha.

In 2008, Rasheedha appeared in Fathimath Nahula's romantic drama film, Yoosuf which depicts the story of a deaf and mute man (played by Yoosuf Shafeeu) who has been mistreated by a wealthy family, mocking his disability. Featuring an ensemble cast including Yoosuf Shafeeu, Niuma Mohamed, Sheela Najeeb, Mohamed Manik, Ahmed Nimal, Fauziyya Hassan, Ravee Farooq, Zeenath Abbas and Ahmed Lais Asim, she played the supportive mother of a heartbroken young woman. The film received widespread critical acclaim and attained blockbuster status at the box office, making it one of the all-time highest-grossing movies in the Maldives.

Abdul Faththaah's romantic drama Hahdhu (2017) was her next film release, in which she played the role of a bully. The film touched upon controversial issues in the Maldives including the depiction of flogging and also shines a light on mental health by featuring an attempted suicide. The film opened to mixed reviews from critics though it emerged as one of the highest grossing Maldivian films of the year. Despite mixed reviews for the film, Rasheedha's character was appreciated by the critics where Aishath Maaha reviewing from Avas wrote: "Though a small role, she shines on the screen with her humor and acting".

=== As a businesswoman ===
When Rasheedha's husband divorces her during her first pregnancy, she sought help from a friend, Khadheeja, an auctioneer, for whom she started working as a business assistant at first. She was later offered by a friend of Khadheeja, to work in a shop which was later expanded to a market lot, operated and managed by Rasheedha. She served over thirty five years in the industry before her demise. She was considered an "inspirational and empowering" businesswoman who has proved that "gender has no bearing on ability".

== Death ==
On 13 November 2019, Rasheedha's family reported that she died on 12 November 2019, due to a cardiac arrest while seeking medical treatment in Thiruvananthapuram, India.

== Filmography ==
=== Feature film ===
Year	Title	Role	Notes	Ref(s)
2006	Vaaloabi Engeynama	Azeeza		
2008	Yoosuf	Mary's mother		
2017	Hahdhu	Dhaleyka's friend		

=== Television ===
Year	Title	Role	Notes	Ref(s)
2003	Vaisoori	Ashiya's sister	Guest role; "Episode: Sama Aai Neena"	
2005	Fukkashi	Aishath	Guest role; "Episode: Fenu Falho"	
2006–2008	Hinithun Velaashey Kalaa	Hareera	Recurring role; 12 episodes	
2009	Mohamma Gaadiyaa	Mohamma's mother	Guest role; "Episode 5"	
2012	Kaiveni	Husna	Recurring role; 4 episodes	

=== Short film ===
Year	Title	Role	Notes	Ref(s)
2006	Vasvaas 2	Kamana		
2006	Kudafoolhuge Vasvaas	Shafeeqa		
2007	Vasvaas 3	Kamana		
2007	Kuri Inthizaaruge Nimun	Husna		
2007	Tarzan	Mother		
2007	Fahu Sofha	Mariyam's mother		
2007	Vasvaas 4	Kamana		
2009	Pink Fairy	Herself	Special appearance	
2010	Maafkuraashey Kalaa	Nuha' Mother		
2010	Dhekafi	Nazima		
2012	Island Thief	Aisanike		
