= Mahdi Ahmed =

Maldivian director and screenwriter

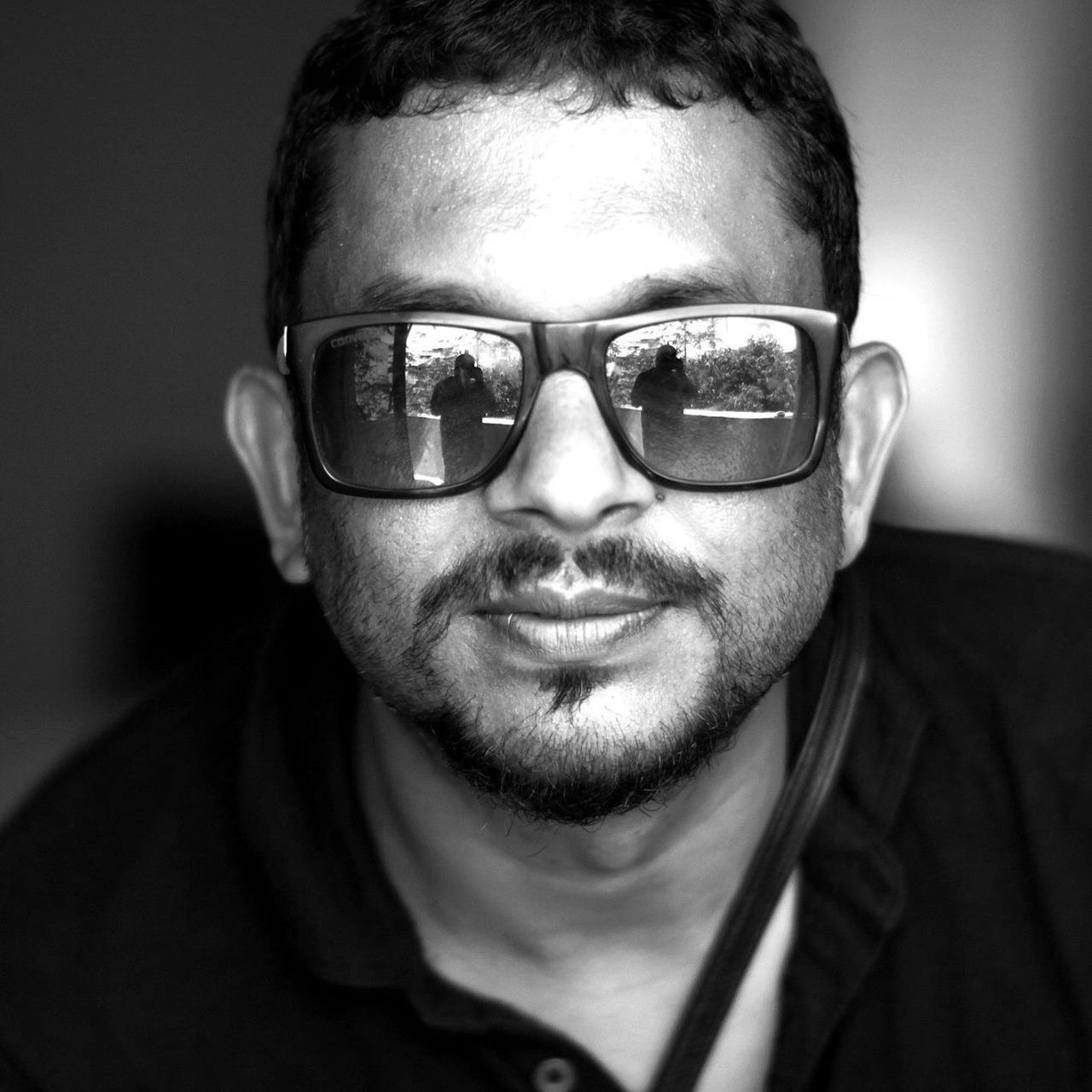
- Born: 17 October 1971 (age 55); Malé, Maldives
- Occupations: Screenwriter, Producer, Director
- Years active: 1998–present
- Spouse: Aminath Shooza
- Children: 1

Mahdi Ahmed (born 17 October 1971) is a Maldivian screenwriter, producer and film director. He made his career debut with critically acclaimed film Amaanaaiy (1998), which fetched him several awards including a Gaumee Film Award for Best Director and Best Screenplay. From 1999 to 2002, he mainly worked as a director and screen writer in the Inter Office Teledrama Competition, which resulted him receiving six awards for the five films submitted. Afterwards, he was mainly recognized for his collaboration with Abdul Faththaah for the romantic disaster film, Hureemey Inthizaarugaa (2005) and fifty episodes' television series Hinithun Velaashey Kalaa (2006). This was followed by Ahmed Nimal-directed romantic film Vaaloabi Engeynama (2006) for which he was bestowed with another Gaumee Film Award for Best Screenplay.

Hussain Munawwar's directorial debut Sazaa (2011) served to be a major breakthrough in his career which fetched him his first Maldives Film Award for best screenplay. However, his biggest accomplishment in the industry is considered to be the critically acclaimed experimental suspense thriller Ingili, which got its international recognition by winning a bronze medal in Best Feature Film category at SAARC Film Festival 2014. Apart from that, Ahmed is known for his comical, modern and naughty dialogues in films like Emme Fahu Vindha Jehendhen (2015) and Vaashey Mashaa Ekee (2016).

== Career ==
=== 1998–2008: Success with Amaanaaiy and office teledramas ===
Ahmed made his directorial debut for the romantic drama Amaanaaiy (1998), which was co-written by Ahmed along with Mohamed Niyaz. The film starring Ali Khalid, Jamsheedha Ahmed and Fathimath Rameeza in the lead revolves around a man who is welcomed with his illegitimate son after the demise of his mother and the consequences of this closure. It is based on Shekhar Kapur's Indian drama film Masoom (1983) which is a remake of the 1982 Malayalam movie Olangal, which are both adaptations of Man, Woman and Child, 1980 novel by Erich Segal. At the 3rd Gaumee Film Awards, he was bestowed with several awards including a Gaumee Film Award for Best Director and Best Screenplay.

From 1999 to 2002, Ahmed mainly worked to represent his office, Ministry of Atolls Administration in the Inter Office Teledrama Competition. During this period, he submitted five drama films, which received a total of fourteen wins in all categories combined. The first project titled Thaubaa (1999) focuses on the journey of a carefree young woman to seek redemption after sinning. This was followed by fairytale romantic drama Abadhah (2000) which follows a woman who goes through a lot of trials and tribulations waiting for her true love. These two films were awarded as the Best Drama at the respective awarding ceremonies, and Ahmed was bestowed with the Best Director award for the latter. The same year, he contributed to two other television films; Kashithammathi and the philosophical drama Vaarey which follows a man with a guilt-ridden past who realizes the beauty of life when it is too late.

In 2001, Ahmed submitted the film Fangi for the competition, which fetched him the third award for Best Film and the first award for Best Director. It also holds the record of maximum wins, by winning six out of seven categories. The film narrates lives of several individuals get interconnected making them realize the suffering of each other and helping them to come to terms with each other's own grief. The following year, he developed the historical film 3 November which is based on the 1988 Maldives coup d'état attempt. It fetched him the second award for Best Director at Office Teledrama Competition.

In 2004, Ahmed collaborated with Ahmed Nimal to rewrite the screenplay of Hama Himeyn from a modern perspective, which was initially conceptualized in 1998. Starring Ali Seezan and Khadheeja Ibrahim Didi in lead roles, the film narrates the compatible relationship of an immature young girl and a drug addict. Upon release, the film received mixed to negative reviews from critics and did average business at box office. In an interview, Ahmed shared his dissatisfaction towards his writing standards in the film and shared his experience of watching the movie in cinema as an "embarrassing" moment.

Ahmed's first project of 2005 was Mohamed Shareef-directed television series Loabi Vaanama which focuses on the lives of four colleagues, played by Sheela Najeeb, Mohamed Manik, Fathimath Noora and Ahmed Saeed. The first episode of the series met with lukewarm response from the audience due to the different visualization style and sequence arrangement. However, from the second episode onwards, the series picked up and become a success among the critics and audience. This was followed by Abdul Faththaah's romantic disaster film, Hureemey Inthizaarugaa (2005) starring Ravee Farooq and Mariyam Zuhura in lead roles. The film, heavily relied on the effect of the 2004 Indian Ocean earthquake on the Maldives, received favorable reviews from critics though it failed to perform financially.

The following year, he again collaborated with Faththaah for two television series; Kuramey Vadhaaee Salaam consisting of 13 episodes and Hinithun Velaashey Kalaa consisting of 52 episodes, where both projects were declared success in television history, the latter in particular. Ahmed Adhushan from Mihaaru picked Hinithun Velaashey Kalaa as one of the best television series developed in Maldives and noted that "along with the title track, this is definitely most accomplished work by director Abdul Faththaah". He also worked with Mohamed Shareef for his docudrama series Nethi Dhiyayas which narrates the true incidents of a young man who recovered from drug addiction. It was applauded by critics and audience for its moral values and being a medium of awareness for drug addiction. The year also marks his collaboration with Ahmed Nimal for the award winning romantic film Vaaloabi Engeynama which was based on Aishath Neena's novel Viremundhaa Hiyy. The film fetched him his second Gaumee Film Award for Best Screenplay.

=== 2011–present: International recognition with Ingili and further releases ===
After a gap of two years, Ahmed made his career breakthrough with Hussain Munawwar's directorial debut, Sazaa, starring Ismail Rasheed, Niuma Mohamed and Lufshan Shakeeb. Based on a novel by Mariyam Moosa, the story of the film revolves around a carefree woman whose life it turned upside down when she is forced to marry a brutal man. Ahmed's work as the screenwriter earned mostly positive comments even though some critics highlighted the "slow storytelling" at the beginning and its "absurd" ending. Critically well received, the film emerged as a commercial success. The film fetched him a Maldives Film Awards for Best Original Screenplay award and his third Gaumee Film Award nomination for Best Screenplay.

2013 was a successful year for Ahmed, where he collaborated with Ravee Farooq for his critically acclaimed experimental suspense thriller Ingili, which was based on fourteen years old Mohamed Hassan's National Award-winning short story, Holhuasheege Ekuveriya. The film is celebrated as the first Maldivian film to get recognized internationally by winning bronze medal in Best Feature Film category at SAARC Film Festival 2014 held in Colombo, Sri Lanka. For the film, he received another Gaumee Film Award nomination for Screenplay while winning his second Maldives Film Award for Best Screenplay. After the success of Sazaa (2011), he again collaborated with Munawwar for the revenge thriller film Dhilakani, released during the same year. The film deals with a man's tumultuous journey to seek vengeance and the demolition of a family bond over a girl. The film attracted negative reviews from critics: Nadheem wrote, "Embraced with futile characters, impractical scenes and outdated music, the film has problems in each department". It fetched him another nomination for Best Original Screenplay at the 3rd Maldives Film Awards.

In 2015, Ahmed worked with Dark Rain Entertainment for Ali Shifau's modern romantic film Emme Fahu Vindha Jehendhen and his psychological thriller Mikoe Bappa Baey Baey. Loosely based on the novel Love Story by Erich Segal, the former received mainly positive reviews from critics. Ismail Nail from Vaguthu called it a "new benchmark" to romantic films and credited a huge success of it to Ahmed's "naughty" screenplay. Similarly, Ahmed received positive reviews from critics for his screenplay for Mikoe Bappa Baey Baey calling it a very "different yet positive" cinematic experience. This was followed by the cop action thriller film Ahmsham co-written with Ahmed Zareer. The film received a mixed to positive response from critics, where Ahmed Nadheem from Avas praised Ahmed's effort to blend romance, action and comedy into the film. All three films released during the year fetched him three separate nominations for Best Screenplay at 8th Gaumee Film Awards.

== Filmography ==
=== Feature film ===
| Year | Title | Writer | Director | Producer | Notes | Ref(s) |
|---|---|---|---|---|---|---|
| 1998 | Amaanaaiy | Yes | Yes | | Gaumee Film Award for Best Director; Gaumee Film Award for Best Adapted Screenplay | |
| 2004 | Hama Himeyn | Yes | | | | |
| 2005 | Hureemey Inthizaarugaa | Yes | | | | |
| 2006 | Vaaloabi Engeynama | Yes | | | Gaumee Film Award for Best Screenplay | |
| 2007 | Aharen | Yes | | | | |
| 2011 | Sazaa | Yes | | | Maldives Film Awards Best Screenplay; Nominated—Gaumee Film Award for Best Screenplay | |
| 2013 | Ingili | Yes | | Yes | Maldives Film Awards Best Screenplay; Nominated—Gaumee Film Award for Best Screenplay | |
| 2013 | Dhilakani | Yes | | | Nominated—Maldives Film Awards Best Screenplay | |
| 2015 | Emme Fahu Vindha Jehendhen | Yes | | | | |
| 2015 | Mikoe Bappa Baey Baey | Yes | | | Nominated—Gaumee Film Award for Best Screenplay | |
| 2015 | Ahsham | Yes | | | Nominated—Gaumee Film Award for Best Screenplay | |
| 2016 | Vaashey Mashaa Ekee | Yes | | | Nominated—Gaumee Film Award for Best Screenplay | |
| 2016 | Vee Beyvafa | Yes | | | | |
| 2017 | Vishka | Yes | | | Nominated—Gaumee Film Award for Best Screenplay | |
| 2017 | Hahdhu | Yes | | | Nominated—Gaumee Film Award for Best Screenplay | |
| 2017 | Neydhen Vakivaakah | Yes | | | | |
| 2019 | Kaaku? | Yes | | | | |
| 2023 | Zoya | Yes | | | | |
| 2024 | Kamanaa | Yes | | | | |
| 2024 | Roboman: The Movie | Yes | | | | |
| 2025 | Kan'bulo | Yes | | | | |

=== Television ===
| Year | Title | Writer | Director | Producer | Notes | Ref(s) |
|---|---|---|---|---|---|---|
| 1999 | Thaubaa | Yes | Yes | | Television film | |
| 2000 | Abadhah | Yes | Yes | | Television film | |
| 2000 | Kashithammathi | Yes | Yes | | Television film | |
| 2000 | Vaarey | Yes | Yes | | Television film | |
| 2001 | Fangi | Yes | | | Television film | |
| 2002 | 3 November | Yes | Yes | | Television film | |
| 2005 | Loabi Vaanama | Yes | | | Television series; 13 episodes | |
| 2006 | Kuramey Vadhaaee Salaam | Yes | | | Television series; 13 episodes | |
| 2006 | Hinithun Velaashey Kalaa | Yes | | | Television series; 52 episodes | |
| 2006 | Nethi Dhiyayas | Yes | | | Television series; 5 episodes | |
| 2007 | Thiya Loabeegai | Yes | | | Television series; 15 episodes | |
| 2007 | Aharenge Lha Daddy | Yes | | | Television series; 5 episodes | |
| 2013 | Vaudhey Mee | Yes | | | Television series; 5 episodes | |
| 2019–2021 | Karu Hakuru | Yes | | | Web series; 36 episodes | |
| 2019–2020 | Thin Bibee | Yes | | | Web series; 12 episodes | |
| 2019 | Hatharu Halha | Yes | | | Web series; 3 segments | |
| 2019–2020 | Maayoos | Yes | | | Web series; 13 episodes | |
| 2021 | Hatharu Manzaru | Yes | | | Anthology series | |
| 2021 | Rugyah | Yes | | | Television Movie | |
| 2021 | Girlfriends | Yes | | | Web series; 12 episodes | |
| 2022 | Gudhan | Yes | | | Web series; 12 episodes | |
| 2023 | Miyo? | Yes | | | Animated series; 12 episodes | |
| 2024 | Manaal | Yes | | | MNU TV Drama | |
| 2025 | Feshun | Yes | | | TV series; 04 episodes | |

=== Short film ===
| Year | Title | Writer | Director | Producer | Notes | Ref(s) |
|---|---|---|---|---|---|---|
| 2006 | Dr. Rocky | Yes | | | | |
| 2009 | Avaamendhuru | Yes | | | | |
| 2021 | First Coconut - Tales of Maldives | Yes | | | | |
| 2021 | Giant Triton Shell - Tales of Maldives | Yes | | | | |
| 2021 | Koimala - Tales of Maldives | Yes | | | | |
| 2021 | Iyaaru | Yes | | | | |
| 2022 | Butterfly | Yes | | | | |
| 2023 | Loabi | Yes | | | | |
| 2023 | Evolution of Maldives Police Service - The Chase | Yes | | | | |
| 2024 | Hinithun | Yes | | | | |
| 2026 | Aailee Gulhun | Yes | | | | |

== Accolades ==
| Year | Award | Category | Nominated work | Result | Ref(s) |
|---|---|---|---|---|---|
| 1999 | Office Teledrama Competition | Best Drama | Thaubaa | Won | |
| 2000 | Office Teledrama Competition | Best Drama | Abadhah | Won | |
| 2000 | Office Teledrama Competition | Best Director | Abadhah | Won | |
| 2001 | Office Teledrama Competition | Best Drama | Fangi | Won | |
| 2001 | Office Teledrama Competition | Best Story | Fangi | Won | |
| 2002 | Office Teledrama Competition | Best Director | 3 November | Won | |
| 2007 | 3rd Gaumee Film Awards | Best Director | Amaanaaiy | Won | |
| 2007 | 3rd Gaumee Film Awards | Best Makeup | Amaanaaiy (shared with Mohamed Niyaz) | Won | |
| 2007 | 3rd Gaumee Film Awards | Best Adapted Screenplay | Amaanaaiy (shared with Mohamed Niyaz) | Won | |
| 2007 | 3rd Gaumee Film Awards | Best Dialogue | Amaanaaiy (shared with Mohamed Niyaz) | Won | |
| 2008 | 5th Gaumee Film Awards | Best Screenplay | Vaaloabi Engeynama | Won | |
| 2008 | 5th Gaumee Film Awards | Best Audiography | Vaaloabi Engeynama (shared with Ali Musthafa) | Won | |
| 2012 | 2nd Maldives Film Awards | Best Screenplay | Sazaa | Won | |
| 2014 | 3rd Maldives Film Awards | Best Screenplay | Ingili | Won | |
| 2014 | 3rd Maldives Film Awards | Best Screenplay | Dhilakani | Nominated | |
| 2014 | 3rd Maldives Film Awards | Best Art Direction | Ingili (shared with Ravee Farooq and Hussain Munawwar) | Won | |
| 2016 | 7th Gaumee Film Awards | Best Screenplay | Ingili | Nominated | |
| 2016 | 7th Gaumee Film Awards | Best Screenplay | Sazaa | Nominated | |
| 2016 | 7th Gaumee Film Awards | Best Art Direction | Ingili (shared with Ravee Farooq and Hussain Munawwar) | Nominated | |
| 2016 | 7th Gaumee Film Awards | Best Costume Design | Ingili (shared with Ravee Farooq) | Nominated | |
| 2017 | 8th Gaumee Film Awards | Best Screenplay | Vaashey Mashaa Ekee | Nominated | |
| 2017 | 8th Gaumee Film Awards | Best Screenplay | Mikoe Bappa Baey Baey | Nominated | |
| 2017 | 8th Gaumee Film Awards | Best Screenplay | Ahsham (shared with Ahmed Zareer) | Nominated | |
| 2024 | NCA Office Teledrama Competition 1445 | Best Screenplay | Manaal | Won | |
