= Emme Fahu Vindha Jehendhen =

Emme Fahu Vindhaa Jehendhen
- Official film poster
- Directed by: Ali Shifau
- Written by: Mahdi Ahmed
- Produced by: Mohamed Ali; Aishath Fuad Thaufeeq
- Starring: Mohamed Jumayyil; Mariyam Majudha; Ali Azim; Mohamed Manik; Sheela Najeeb; Khadheeja Ibrahim Didi; Roanu Hassan Manik
- Cinematography: Ali Shifau; Ahmed Sinan
- Edited by: Ali Shifau
- Music by: Mohamed Ikram
- Production company: Dark Rain Entertainment
- Release date: April 5, 2015
- Country: Maldives
- Language: Dhivehi
- Budget: MVR500,000

Emme Fahu Vindha Jehendhen (transl. Till the last pulse) is a 2015 Maldivian romantic-drama film, starring Mohamed Jumayyil and Mariyam Majudha in the lead roles. The film was released on 5 April 2015. The film is loosely based on the novel 'Love Story' by American novelist Erich Segal.

== Plot ==
Ryan (Mohamed Jumayyil), a rich boy and Meera (Mariyam Majudha), an ordinary girl meet while holidaying in an island and fall madly in love. But tragedy strikes when they decide to get married. Despite his father Afeef's (Mohamed Manik) discontentment, Ryan marries Meera only to find him being cut off from his father's wealth. Their perfect life is thrown into turmoil when Ryan learns that Meera has blood cancer.

Since Ryan has been cut off his father's property he can't afford Meera's treatment. On top of this Ryan's mother died from a heart attack leaving him more devastated. Not wanting Meera to leave him Ryan tries his best to keep her happy. Meanwhile, Ryan gets fired from his job due a conspiracy by his rival.

After being jobless, Ryan has no option but to take help from his father for financial support, but after seeing his father's ego he refused to accept his help. After few days Meera come to know about her health condition, and both Meera and Ryan decided to go aboard for treatment. On their way to airport Meera faints and gets hospitalised. Meera's get condition worsen day by day, while Ryan kept on praying for her recovery. On doctor's advice, Ryan takes Meera home and try to keep her happy as she has very little time left to live. However Meera dies in Ryan's arms with the assurance that no matter that Ryan will support her till her last pulse.

The film ends with Afeef regret for his mistake of considering Meera as a gold digger and apologise Ryan for it, but Ryan doesn't forgive him as Afeef is the reason he lost his Meera forever.

== Cast ==
- Mohamed Jumayyil as Ryan
- Mariyam Majudha as Meera
- Ali Azim as Ryan's friend
- Mohamed Manik as Afeef, Ryan's father
- Sheela Najeeb as Inaya, Ryan's mother
- Khadheeja Ibrahim Didi as Amira
- Roanu Hassan Manik as Samad, Ryan's boss
- Adam Rizwee as Dr. Najaah Ali
- Ali Shazleem as Ahusan, Ryan's rival at work.
- Fathimath Shama as Meera's friend

== Soundtrack ==
Track listing
| No. | Title | Lyrics | Singer(s) | Length |
|---|---|---|---|---|
| 1. | "Chaaley" | Fathuhulla Abdul Fahthah | Fathuhulla Abdul Fahthah |
| 2. | "Chaaley" | Fathuhulla Abdul Fahthah | Mohamed Jumayyil |
| 3. | "Roalee mey" | Fathuhulla Abdul Fahthah | Fathuhulla Abdul Fahthah |
| 4. | "Thihthi Maa" | Equatic Vibe | Equatic Vibe |
| 5. | "Gehlifaa" | Equatic Vibe | Equatic Vibe |

== Accolades ==
| Award | Category | Recipient(s) and nominee(s) | Result | Ref(s) |
|---|---|---|---|---|
| 8th Gaumee Film Awards | Best film | Emme Fahu Vindha Jehendhen | Nominated | |
| 8th Gaumee Film Awards | Best Director | Ali Shifau | Nominated | |
| 8th Gaumee Film Awards | Best Actor | Mohamed Jumayyil | Nominated | |
| 8th Gaumee Film Awards | Best Actress | Mariyam Majudha | Nominated | |
| 8th Gaumee Film Awards | Original Song | Shammoon Mohamed for "Gellifa" | Nominated | |
| 8th Gaumee Film Awards | Male Playback Singer | Shammoon Mohamed for "Gellifa" | Nominated | |
| 8th Gaumee Film Awards | Best Editing | Ali Shifau | Nominated | |
| 8th Gaumee Film Awards | Best Cinematography | Ali Shifau and Ahmed Sinan | Nominated | |
| 8th Gaumee Film Awards | Best Screenplay | Mahdi Ahmed | Nominated | |
| 8th Gaumee Film Awards | Best Background Music | Mohamed Ikram | Won | |
| 8th Gaumee Film Awards | Best Sound Editing | Ali Shifau and Mohamed Ikram | Nominated | |
| 8th Gaumee Film Awards | Best Sound Mixing | Mohamed Ikram | Nominated | |
| 8th Gaumee Film Awards | Best Art Direction | Mohamed Ali and Ali Shifau | Nominated | |
| 8th Gaumee Film Awards | Best Costume Design | Mariyam Majudha | Nominated | |
| 8th Gaumee Film Awards | Best Makeup | Mariyam Majudha | Nominated | |
