= Maalhos =

Maalhos may refer to the following places in the Maldives:

- Maalhos (Alif Alif Atoll)
- Maalhos (Baa Atoll)
