= Vaaloabi Engeynama =

- Official film poster
- Directed by: Ahmed Nimal
- Written by: Aishath Neena
- Screenplay by: Mahdi Ahmed
- Produced by: Abdul Faththaah
- Starring: Yoosuf Shafeeu; Mariyam Afeefa; Fathimath Fareela; Ali Riyaz
- Cinematography: Ibrahim Moosa
- Edited by: Ali Musthafa
- Music by: Ibrahim Nifar
- Production company: Red Production
- Release date: December 10, 2006
- Running time: 183 minutes
- Country: Maldives
- Language: Dhivehi

Vaaloabi Engeynama is a 2006 Maldivian romantic film directed by Ahmed Nimal. Produced by Abdul Faththaah under Red Production, the film stars Yoosuf Shafeeu, Mariyam Afeefa, Fathimath Fareela and Ali Riyaz in pivotal roles. It was based on Aishath Neena's novel Viremundhaa Hiyy.

== Premise ==
Ali Shiham (Yoosuf Shafeeu) was seven years old when his father died and his mother married to a heart patient, Abdul Rasheed (Koyya Hassan Manik) who hailed up them in good health and prosperity. Ever since, his daughter, Aminath Niha (Mariyam Afeefa) and Shiham spend time together and grew us best friends. On her father's deathbed, he wished both Shiham and Niha to marry each other which created an altercation between them. Shiham who is already in a relationship with Azu (Fathimath Fareela) agreed to marry Niha on a mutual understanding that their marriage is solely intended to please Niha's father and they will separate when he dies. As days pass by, Niha slowly feel herself being attracted to Shiham who is still in love with Azu. After Rasheed's funeral, Shiham decided to marry Azu without divorcing Niha since the latter is in a state of depression post her father's death. Complication arises when Shiham had to equally fulfill his responsibilities to both his wives.

== Cast ==
- Yoosuf Shafeeu as Ali Shiham
- Mariyam Afeefa as Aminath Niha
- Fathimath Fareela as Azu
- Ali Riyaz as Suja
- Fauziyya Hassan as Shareefa
- Koyya Hassan Manik as Abdul Rasheed
- Aishath Rasheedha as Azeeza
- Ibrahim Wisan as a camera-man (Special appearance)
- Ahmed Nimal as an advertisement director (Special appearance)

== Soundtrack ==
Track listing
No.	Title	Lyrics	Singer(s)	Length
1.	"Vaaloabi Engeynama"	Mohamed Abdul Ghanee	Mohamed Abdul Ghanee, Aishath Inaya
2.	"Jaadhooga Dheewana"	Mohamed Abdul Ghanee	Mohamed Abdul Ghanee, Shifa Thaufeeq
3.	"Jaadhoovi Heelun"	Mohamed Abdul Ghanee	Ibrahim Nifar
4.	"Vaaloabi Engeynama" (Slow version)	Mohamed Abdul Ghanee	Hassan Ilham
5.	"Vaaloabi Engeynama" (Reprise version)	Mohamed Abdul Ghanee	Mukhthar Adam
6.	"Annaashey"	Mohamed Abdul Ghanee	Shifa Thaufeeq

== Accolades ==
Year	Award	Category	Recipients	Result	Ref.
2007	Miadhu Crystal Award	Best Female Debut	Mariyam Afeefa	Won	
2007	Miadhu Crystal Award	Best Original Song	Ibrahim Nifar for "Vaaloabi Engeynama"	Won	
2008	5th Gaumee Film Awards	Best Film	Vaaloabi Engeynama	Won	
2008	5th Gaumee Film Awards	Best Director	Ahmed Nimal	Won	
2008	5th Gaumee Film Awards	Best Actor	Yoosuf Shafeeu	Won	
2008	5th Gaumee Film Awards	Best Actress	Mariyam Afeefa	Won	
2008	5th Gaumee Film Awards	Best Supporting Actor	Ali Riyaz	Nominated	
2008	5th Gaumee Film Awards	Best Supporting Actress	Fathimath Fareela	Won	
2008	5th Gaumee Film Awards	Best Supporting Actress	Fauziyya Hassan	Nominated	
2008	5th Gaumee Film Awards	Best Original Song	Ibrahim Nifar for "Vaaloabi Engeynama"	Won	
2008	5th Gaumee Film Awards	Best Editing	Ali Musthafa	Won	
2008	5th Gaumee Film Awards	Best Screenplay	Mahdi Ahmed	Won	
2008	5th Gaumee Film Awards	Best Background Music	Ibrahim Nifar	Won	
2008	5th Gaumee Film Awards	Best Audiography	Mahdi Ahmed, Ali Musthafa	Won	
2008	5th Gaumee Film Awards	Best Choreography	Fathimath Fareela for "Annaashey"	Won	
2008	5th Gaumee Film Awards	Best Costume Design	Naziya Ismail	Won	
2010	Maldives Video Music Awards	Best Video Song	Abdul Faththaah for "Vaaloabi Engeynama"	Won	
2010	Maldives Video Music Awards	Best Music Composition	Ibrahim Nifar for "Vaaloabi Engeynama"	Won	
