= Amaanaaiy =

- Official film poster
- Directed by: Mahdi Ahmed
- Screenplay by: Mahdi Ahmed; Mohamed Niyaz
- Produced by: Mohamed Niyaz
- Starring: Ali Khalid; Fathimath Rameeza; Jamsheedha Ahmed; Iujaz Hafiz
- Cinematography: Mohamed Manik; Hassan Haleem
- Edited by: Mohamed Niyaz
- Music by: Mohamed Ikram
- Production company: Eternal Pictures
- Release date: November 4, 1998
- Country: Maldives
- Language: Dhivehi

Amaanaaiy is a 1998 Maldivian romantic drama film released on 4 November 1998 and directed by Mahdi Ahmed. Produced by Mohamed Niyaz under Eternal Pictures, the film stars Ali Khalid, Fathimath Rameeza, Jamsheedha Ahmed and Iujaz Hafiz in pivotal roles. The film revolves around a man who is welcomed with his illegitimate son after the child's mother's death and the events that proceed when his wife is not fond of the child.

The film is based on Shekhar Kapur's Indian drama film Masoom (1983) which is a remake of the 1982 Malayalam movie Olangal, both being adaptations of Man, Woman and Child, a 1980 novel by Erich Segal. However, the film majorly focuses on the character of Ashiya — played by Jamsheedha Ahmed — whose role has been derived from Supriya Pathak's in Mausoom who only features for around five minutes.

== Plot ==
Ashiya (Jamsheedha Ahmed), an eighteen-year-old is being trained as a teacher when she hears the news of her mother's death. Psychologically disturbed, she meets a colleague, Mohamed Fairooz (Mohamed Hassan) and they initiate a romantic relationship. Despite her landlord's consent, Ashiya goes on an overnight trip with Fairooz. Fearing a tarnished reputation, her landlord throws her out of the house, hence Ashiya and Fairooz move in together. He forces her into prostitution. She completes her studies and flees to her island with the help of Bakuru (Abdul Sattar), her step father. She then starts working as a primary teacher on the island.

Zahid (Ali Khalid), a father of two girls — Neena and Nilfa — goes to S. Gan for office work and stays at Bakuru's house since the return flight is delayed. There he meets Ashiya, and a bond is created between them. They have a moment of intimacy and she gets pregnant from extramarital affairs. Zahid returns to Malé. Fifteen days later, she receives a letter from Zahid informing his wife's pregnancy. Fearing the news of pregnancy might ruin Zahid's marriage, Ashiya decides not to reveal it to him. She gives birth to a boy, Anil, and he grows up unaware of his father's identity. When her son is nine years old, Ashiya dies of illness.

After Ashiya's death, Bakuru sends word to Zahid informing him that his son needs a home. Zahid brings Anil home, falsifying his identity in front of his wife Shafeeqa (Fathimath Rameeza). Similarly, Anil is never told that Zahid is his father as he bonds with Zahid and his daughters. On his friend's request, Zahid reveals Anil's identity to Shafeeqa who is devastated to learn of her husband's infidelity. Afterwards, she can't bear to look at him, a tangible reminder of Anil's betrayal. Shafeeqa has a hard time reconciling with Anil.

Zahid, worried by the effect Anil is having on his family, decides to put him at Dhanaal; Anil accepts with reluctance. However, since it is the holidays, Zahid returns to Malé with Anil until the re-opening of the school. Eavesdropping an argument between Zahid and Shafeeqa, Anil figures out that Zahid is his father and runs away from home. Anil is reunited with Shafeeqa and Zahid at the hospital where Anil confesses his awareness of the identity of his father to them. Shafeeqa is unable to bear his heartbreak and intercepts Anil before he departs to Addu to start education at Dhanaal, thereby accepting him into the family and wholeheartedly forgiving Zahid.

== Cast ==
- Ali Khalid as Zahid
- Fathimath Rameeza as Shafeeqa
- Jamsheedha Ahmed as Ashiya
- Iujaz Hafiz as Anil
- Abdul Sattar as Bakuru
- Mariyam Naisha as Neena
- Aminath Suzan as Nilfa
- Mohamed Hassan as Mohamed Fairooz
- Ibrahim Rasheed as Afeef
- Abdul Qadir as Haroon
- Ahmed Faisal as Amjad
- Khadheeja Moosa as Fareesha
- Sithi Fulhu as Sithi Fulhu
- Ravee Farooq as Fairooz's friend (Special appearance)
- Aminath Rasheedha (Special appearance in picnic sequence)

== Soundtrack ==
Track listing
No.	Title	Lyrics	Music	Singer(s)	Length
1.	"Thaqudheer"	Mausoom Shakir	Mohamed Imthiyaz	Fazeela Amir, Ali Rameez
2.	"Mausoom"	Ahmed Sharumeel	Ibrahim Shiham	Mohamed Huzam
3.	"Amaanaaiy"	Aminath Faaiza	Mohamed Imthiyaz	Fathimath Rauf
4.	"Kurun'baa"	Ahmed Sharumeel	Mohamed Ikram	Leesha Haneef, Iujaz Hafiz, Aminath Suzan
5.	"Jawahir"	Ahmed Sharumeel	Mohamed Ikram	Fathimath Rauf
6.	"Dhu'aa"	Mausoom Shakir	Mohamed Ikram	Fathimath Rauf, Umar Zahir
7.	"Kulunu"	Ahmed Sharumeel	Mohamed Ikram	Shifa Thaufeeq
8.	"Ummeedhu"	Abdul Rahim Rashad	Mohamed Ikram	Ali Rameez

== Accolades ==
Year	Award	Category	Recipients	Result
1999	Aafathis Awards - 1998	Best Actress	Jamsheedha Ahmed	Won
2007	3rd Gaumee Film Awards	Best Film	Amaanaaiy	Won
2007	3rd Gaumee Film Awards	Best Director	Mahdi Ahmed	Won
2007	3rd Gaumee Film Awards	Best Actress	Jamsheedha Ahmed	Won
2007	3rd Gaumee Film Awards	Best Actor	Ali Khalid	Nominated
2007	3rd Gaumee Film Awards	Best Supporting Actor	Abdul Satthar	Won
2007	3rd Gaumee Film Awards	Best Female Playback Singer	Fazeela Amir for "Mihitha Loabi Dheynan"	Won
2007	3rd Gaumee Film Awards	Best Editing	Mohamed Niyaz	Won
2007	3rd Gaumee Film Awards	Best Cinematography	Mohamed Manik, Hassan Haleem	Won
2007	3rd Gaumee Film Awards	Best Background Music	Mohamed Ikram	Won
2007	3rd Gaumee Film Awards	Best Makeup	Mohamed Niyaz, Mahdi Ahmed	Won
2007	3rd Gaumee Film Awards	Best Adapted Screenplay	Mohamed Niyaz, Mahdi Ahmed	Won
2007	3rd Gaumee Film Awards	Best Dialogue	Mohamed Niyaz, Mahdi Ahmed	Won
