= Hahdhu =

2017 maldavian romantic film

- Official film poster
- Directed by: Abdul Faththaah
- Screenplay by: Mahdi Ahmed
- Produced by: Abdul Faththaah; Niuma Mohamed
- Starring: Mariyam Azza; Ahmed Shiban; Aminath Rishfa; Ali Azim
- Cinematography: Ibrahim Wisan
- Edited by: Ahmed Sajid
- Music by: Ismail Adheel
- Production company: Red Production
- Release date: September 6, 2017
- Country: Maldives
- Language: Dhivehi

Hahdhu (transl. Limit) is a 2017 Maldivian romantic film directed by Abdul Faththaah. Produced by Abdul Faththaah and Niuma Mohamed under Red Production, the film stars Mariyam Azza, Ahmed Shiban and Aminath Rishfa in pivotal roles. The film was released on 6 September 2017.

== Plot ==
Yusra, a cheerful young woman returns to Kelaa (Haa Alif Atoll), her home island after completing her teaching course in Male'. On the boat, she meets a quiet young man named Ali and gets smitten by him instantly. Ali and Yusra are opposites as Ali is quiet and brooding, while Yusra is chatty and cheerful. Ali and Yusra bond during the trip, and Ali decides to stay at Kelaa for a few days after their boat has engine problems. On the other hand, Hamza is a young man in Kelaa often humiliated and ostracised from the community due to his mother's extramarital affairs; leaving Hamza to care for his bedridden father alone. One day, a dejected Hamza, tired and ashamed of his mother's behaviour attempts to commit suicide by drowning himself. Yusra rescues him and talks to him, after which Hazma starts developing feelings for her.

Yusra's mother does not approve of her growing friendship with Ali as she prefers Yusra to marry a man from their island. Ali invites Yusra to go to Utheemu with him, which her mother initially refuses as she is worried Yusra and Ali's bond may progress further. After some convincing, Yusra ends up going to Utheemu and spends most of her time with Ali. The two get closer and end up having sex. Afterwards, Ali gets attacked by some goons, falls unconscious and is admitted to the hospital. In the hospital, Ali's mother insults Yusra and her mother's social status and blames them for Ali's condition. Yusra yells back at Ali's mother as she cannot stand her mother being insulted. Ali regains consciousness at this moment and misunderstands the argument, with Ali's mother claiming it was Yusra who insulted her first. An angry Ali breaks things off with Yusra and leaves on bad terms.

A few weeks after Ali's departure, Yusra learns she is pregnant with Ali's child and tries to tell him about it, but Ali refuses to talk to her. Yusra quits her job as a teacher and decides to repent for her mistakes. She tells her mother about her pregnancy and her mother abandons her as she is pregnant out of wedlock. Yusra and her mother get humiliated by the community further as Yusra's mother was someone who prided herself on her upbringing. Hamza who has now fallen in love with Yusra, stands by her side and offers her support even after her delivery. However, her mother soon dies unable to bear the humiliation. Yusra gets publicly flogged as per the Islamic punishment for zina, with sneering onlookers insisting the punishment was not enough. Hamza, angry at the community's hypocrisy defends Yusra publicly, shutting up the sneers. Yusra passes out from the pain and is taken to the hospital, where she realizes that she is now paralysed from the waist down.

On the other hand, Ali, now more confident and chatty reconnects with his childhood love, Zamha, who was recently widowed due to her husband dying in a car accident. Zamha is amused by the changes to Ali's personality and begins seeing him more. After Ali meets Zamha's family and bonds with her daughter, Zamha realizes that Ali is in love with her. Zamha and Ali begin a relationship and soon get married. They live a happy life until Ali learns about his child and Yusra's suffering through a family friend. He visits Yusra's island only to find out that Yusra has died.

Repenting for his mistakes, Ali decides to take care of his and Yusra's son Samah. He brings Samah to Zamha and apologizes to her, but Zamha refuses and kicks him out of her life. The film ends with Zamha's father asking her if she could accept Samah as her own son and give him the love of a mother.

== Cast ==
- Mariyam Azza as Yusra Ali
- Shiban Ahmed as Ali
- Aminath Rishfa as Zamha
- Ahmed Fairooz as Azim
- Ali Azim as Hamza
- Arifa Ibrahim as Ali's mother
- Mohamed Rasheed as Firag; Zamha's father
- Gulisthan Mohamed as Haamida; Zamha's mother
- Mariyam Shakeela as Hamza's mother
- Fauziyya Hassan as Yusra's mother
- Mariyam Haleem as Dhaleyka
- Aishath Rasheedha
- Mohamed Najah as Mohamed
- Aminath Muhusina
- Faiha Ibrahim
- Nuzuhath Shuaib in the item number "Girity Loabin" (Special appearance)

== Reception ==
Hahdhu received mixed reviews from critics. Aishath Maaha of Avas praised the performance of Azza and Rishfa while she criticised Shiban's acting in his debut film. Though the screenplay by Ahmed was favored, she noticed some "loopholes that restricted character development".

== Soundtrack ==
Track listing
No.	Title	Lyrics	Music	Singer(s)	Length
1.	"Udhuhilamaa"	Mohamed Abdul Ghanee	Fathuhulla Abdul Fatthah	Mariyam Ashfa, Mohamed Abdul Ghanee	4:08
2.	"Neydheymey Alivileykah"	Mohamed Abdul Ghanee	Ahmed Imthiyaz	Mariyam Ashfa	4:48
3.	"Beehilaashey"	Mohamed Abdul Ghanee	Fathuhulla Abdul Fatthah	Mariyam Ashfa, Mohamed Abdul Ghanee	4:44
4.	"Dhu'aa"	Mohamed Abdul Ghanee	Ibrahim Shiham	Mariyam Ashfa, Mohamed Abdul Ghanee, Yoosuf Alson Mohamed	4:18
5.	"Giritee Loabin"	Beyya Huhthu	Ismail Adheel	Mariyam Ashfa, Mohamed Abdul Ghanee	4:25
6.	"Thaubaa"	Mohamed Abdul Ghanee, Ismail Mubarik - (Arabic part)	Ibrahim Zaid Ali	Mohamed Abdul Ghanee, Shalabee Ibrahim, Hussain Ali, Ibrahim Zaid Ali, Ibrahim Nashif	4:38

== Accolades ==
Award	Category	Recipients	Result	Ref.
9th Gaumee Film Awards	Best film	Hahdhu	Nominated	
9th Gaumee Film Awards	Best Director	Abdul Faththaah	Nominated	
9th Gaumee Film Awards	Best Actress	Mariyam Azza	Nominated	
9th Gaumee Film Awards	Best Supporting Actor	Ali Azim	Won	
9th Gaumee Film Awards	Best Supporting Actress	Fauziyya Hassan	Nominated	
9th Gaumee Film Awards	Original Song	Ibrahim Shiham for "Dhuaa"	Nominated	
9th Gaumee Film Awards	Best Lyricist	Mohamed Abdul Ghanee for "Dhuaa"	Nominated	
9th Gaumee Film Awards	Best Female Playback Singer	Mariyam Ashfa - "Udhuhilamaa"	Nominated	
9th Gaumee Film Awards	Best Female Playback Singer	Mariyam Ashfa - "Dhuaa"	Nominated	
9th Gaumee Film Awards	Best Female Playback Singer	Mariyam Ashfa - "Beehilaashey"	Nominated	
9th Gaumee Film Awards	Best Editing	Ahmed Sajid	Nominated	
9th Gaumee Film Awards	Best Cinematography	Ibrahim Wisan	Nominated	
9th Gaumee Film Awards	Best Screenplay	Mahdi Ahmed	Nominated	
9th Gaumee Film Awards	Best Background Music	Ismail Adheel	Nominated	
9th Gaumee Film Awards	Best Art Direction	Abdul Faththaah	Nominated	
9th Gaumee Film Awards	Best Costume Design	Naziya Ismail	Nominated	
9th Gaumee Film Awards	Best Sound Editing	Ismail Adheel	Nominated	
