= 5th Gaumee Film Awards =

- Date: 12 April 2008

Highlights
- Best Film: Vaaloabi Engeynama
- Most awards: Vaaloabi Engeynama (12)

5th Gaumee Film Awards ceremony, honored the best Maldivian films released between 2006 and 2007. The ceremony was held on 12 April 2008.

== Winners and nominees ==
=== Main awards ===
Nominees were announced in April 2008.

Best Film	Best Director
Vaaloabi Engeynama	Ahmed Nimal – Vaaloabi Engeynama
Best Actor	Best Actress
Yoosuf Shafeeu – Vaaloabi Engeynama; Ravee Farooq – Hiyani; Yoosuf Shafeeu – Hukuru Vileyrey; Mohamed Manik – Hithuge Edhun	Mariyam Afeefa – Vaaloabi Engeynama; Aishath Rishmy – Hukuru Vileyrey; Niuma Mohamed – Hiyani; Niuma Mohamed – Hithuge Edhun; Zeenath Abbas – Heylaa
Best Supporting Actor	Best Supporting Actress
Ismail Rasheed – Heylaa; Yoosuf Shafeeu – Vasvaas; Ali Riyaz – Vaaloabi Engeynama; Lufshan Shakeeb – Hiyani; Lufshan Shakeeb – Heylaa	Fathimath Fareela – Vaaloabi Engeynama; Sheela Najeeb – Hithuge Edhun; Fauziyya Hassan – Vaaloabi Engeynama; Mariyam Azza – Hukuru Vileyrey; Zeenath Abbas – Hukuru Vileyrey
Best Child Artist	Best Story
Ahmed Mauroof – Heylaa	Moomin Fuad – Heylaa
Original Song	Best Lyricist
Ibrahim Nifar - "Vaaloabi Engeynama" - Vaaloabi Engeynama	Ahmed Nashid - "Veynee Udhaas" - Hithuge Edhun
Best Playback Singer – Male	Best Playback Singer – Female
Hussain Ali - "Shikaayathekey" - Hiyani	Fathimath Zoona - "Magey Loabivaa Ey" - Hithuge Edhun

=== Technical awards ===
Best Editing	Best Cinematography
Ali Musthafa – Vaaloabi Engeynama	Moomin Fuad, Ali Shifau – Heylaa
Best Screenplay	Best Background Music
Mahdi Ahmed – Vaaloabi Engeynama	Ibrahim Nifar – Vaaloabi Engeynama
Best Audiography	Best Choreography
Mahdi Ahmed, Ali Musthafa – Vaaloabi Engeynama	Fathimath Fareela - "Annaashey" - Vaaloabi Engeynama; Ravee Farooq - "Asthaa Asthaa" – Hiyani
Best Art Direction	Best Visual Effects
Moomin Fuad, Ali Shifau – Heylaa	Ahmed Shiyam, Hamid Ibrahim, Hassan Adam – Hukuru Vileyrey
Best Costume Design	Best Makeup
Naziya Ismail – Vaaloabi Engeynama	Hassan Adam, Fathimath Fareela – Hukuru Vileyrey

=== Short film ===
Best Film	Best Director
Edhonveli Thundi 1	Yoosuf Shafeeu – Edhonveli Thundi 1
Best Actor	Best Actress
Ali Riyaz – Vasvaas 2	Niuma Mohamed – Fahu Sofha

== See also ==
- Gaumee Film Awards
