= Gaumee Film Award for Best Costume Design =

- Awarded for: Best Costume Design
- Country: Maldives
- Presented by: National Centre for the Arts

The Gaumee Film Award for Best Costume Design is given as part of the Gaumee Film Awards for Maldivian Films.

The award was first given in 1995. Here is a list of the award winners and the nominees of the respective award ceremonies.

== Winners and nominees ==
Year	Photos of winners	Costume Designer	Film	Ref(s)
1st (1995)	Not Awarded			
2nd (1997)	Not Awarded			
3rd (2007)	Not Awarded			
4th (2007)		Jadhulla Ismail, Laila	Zuleykha	
4th (2007)		No Other Nominee		
5th (2008)		Naziya Ismail	Vaaloabi Engeynama	
5th (2008)		No Other Nominee		
6th (2015)		Aminath Rasheedha, Aishath Rishmy, Ahmed Shiyam	Fanaa	
6th (2015)		Shimla	Zalzalaa En'buri Aun	
6th (2015)		Mohamed Abdulla, Niuma Mohamed	Hiyy Rohvaanulaa	
6th (2015)		Ibrahim Ali, Aminath Hassan	Happy Birthday	
6th (2015)		Razeena Thaufeeq, Jadhulla Ismail	Yoosuf	
7th (2016)		Aminath Nasreena, Ahmed Saeed	Loodhifa	
7th (2016)		Ravee Farooq, Mahdi Ahmed	Ingili	
7th (2016)		Razeena Thaufeeq	Love Story	
7th (2016)		Hussain Munawwar	Sazaa	
7th (2016)		Ahmed Saeed, Ismail Shafeeq, Yoosuf Shafeeu	Insaaf	
8th (2017)		Mariyam Majudha	Vaashey Mashaa Ekee	
8th (2017)		Aishath Fuad Thaufeeq, Mariyam Majudha	Hulhudhaan	
8th (2017)		Ali Seezan	Ahsham	
8th (2017)		Razeena Thaufeeq, Fathimath Nahula	4426	
8th (2017)		Mariyam Majudha	Emme Fahu Vindha Jehendhen	
9th (2019)		Abdulla Wisham, Aminath Noora, Mohamed Riffath	Vishka	
9th (2019)		Adam Munthasir	Ill Noise	
9th (2019)		Naziya Ismail	Hahdhu	
9th (2019)		Eupe Productions	Dhevansoora	
9th (2019)		Hussain Hazim	Vakin Loabin	

== See also ==
- Gaumee Film Awards
