= Nethi Dhiyayas =

Maldivian television series

- Screenplay by: Mahdi Ahmed
- Directed by: Mohamed Shareef
- Starring: Ismail Rasheed; Roanu Hassan Manik; Aminath Rasheedha; Ahmed Saeed
- Music by: Muaviyath Anwar
- Country of origin: Maldives
- Original language: Dhivehi
- No. of seasons: 1
- No. of episodes: 5

Production
- Executive producer: Maiyam Shaugee
- Producer: Television Maldives
- Cinematography: Ahmed Mohamed
- Editor: Mohamed Shareef

Original release
- Release: 2006

Nethi Dhiyayas is a Maldivian docudrama series developed for Television Maldives by Mohamed Shareef. Produced by Television Maldived, the series stars Ismail Rasheed, Mohamed Manik, Aminath Rasheedha and Roanu Hassan Manik in pivotal roles. The story narrates the true incidents of a young man who recovered from drug addiction.

== Cast ==
=== Main ===
- Ismail Rasheed as Nasir
- Ali Iufaaf Ismail as young Nasir
- Roanu Hassan Manik as Anwar
- Aminath Rasheedha as Rasheedha
- Ahmed Saeed as Hampe
- Khadheeja Mohamed as Thahumeena

=== Recurring ===
- Mohamed Manik as Asim
- Hussain Shibau as Boney
- Ibrahim Usman
- Mariyam Afeefa as Reena

=== Guest ===
- Naashidha Mohamed as Shaira
- Ali Waheed
- Ahmed Hassan
- Ahmed Ziya as a customer (Episode 4)

== Episodes ==
| No. in season | Title | Directed by |
|---|---|---|
| 1 | "Episode 1" | Mohamed Shareef |
Nasir (Ismail Rasheed) is the eldest child of Rasheedha (Aminath Rasheedha) and Anwar (Roanu Hassan Manik) who grew up with the right upbringings. However, during his school days of secondary education, Nasir joined a gang of three friends, Hampe (Ahmed Saeed) and Boney (Hussain Shibau) who convinces him to mischief behavior from bunking classes, lying to parents and smoking.
| 2 | "Episode 2" | Mohamed Shareef |
Despite the advice and guidance from Nasir's friend, Asim (Mohamed Manik), he detached from his studies and instead focuses on winning the heart of a young woman, Reena (Mariyam Afeefa) which slowly deviates him from his involvement in the gang. Reluctant, Nasir joins Maldives National Defense Force.
| 3 | "Episode 3" | Mohamed Shareef |
Nasir and Reena, having blessed with a son expect another child. Few months prior to Reena's delivery, Nasir had to depart to India for a military course where he again starts drinking. Nasir resigns from his job and goes back to his old drug-addict days. Drunk, he comes home one day and divorces Reena. He then marries another girl, Shaira (Naashidha Mohamed) while having an affair with Thahumeena (Khadheeja Mohamed). His life takes a further downturn when he gets fired from his resort job due to disciplinary issues.
| 4 | "Episode 4" | Mohamed Shareef |
| 5 | "Episode 5" | Mohamed Shareef |

== Soundtrack ==
Track listing
| No. | Title | Music | Singer(s) | Length |
|---|---|---|---|---|
| 1. | "Theme song" | Mohamed Fuad | Ahmed Tholal |

== Response ==
Upon release, the series was applauded by critics and audience for its moral values and being a medium of awareness for drug addiction.

== Accolades ==
| Year | Award | Category | Recipients | Result | Ref. |
|---|---|---|---|---|---|
| 2008 | 2nd Miadhu Crystal Award | Best Actor - Drama Series | Ismail Rasheed | Won | |
