= Gaumee Film Award for Best Background Music =

- Awarded for: Best Background Music
- Country: Maldives
- Presented by: National Centre for the Arts

The Gaumee Film Award for Best Background Music is given as part of the Gaumee Film Awards for Maldivian Films.

The award was first given in 1995. Here is a list of the award winners and the nominees of the respective award ceremonies.

== Winners and nominees ==
| Year | Photos of winners | Director | Film | Ref(s) |
|---|---|---|---|---|
| 1st (1995) | | Ahmed Affaal, Ahmed Amir | Dheriyaa | |
| 1st (1995) | | No Other Nominee | | |
| 2nd (1997) | Not Available | | | |
| 3rd (2007) | | Mohamed Ikram | Amaanaaiy | |
| 3rd (2007) | | No Other Nominee | | |
| 4th (2007) | | Ayyuman Shareef | Edhathuru | |
| 4th (2007) | | No Other Nominee | | |
| 5th (2008) | | Ibrahim Nifar | Vaaloabi Engeynama | |
| 5th (2008) | | No Other Nominee | | |
| 6th (2015) | | Mohamed Ikram | Niuma | |
| 6th (2015) | | Ayyuman Shareef | Zalzalaa En'buri Aun | |
| 6th (2015) | | Ibrahim Nifar | Yoosuf | |
| 7th (2016) | | Mohamed Ikram | Sazaa | |
| 7th (2016) | | Ibrahim Nifar | Dhilakani | |
| 7th (2016) | | Mohamed Fuad | Fathis Handhuvaruge Feshun 3D | |
| 7th (2016) | | Mohamed Ikram | Loodhifa | |
| 7th (2016) | | Mohamed Ikram | Hiyy Yaara Dheefa | |
| 8th (2017) | | Mohamed Ikram | Emme Fahu Vindha Jehendhen | |
| 8th (2017) | | Ayyuman Shareef | Aniyaa | |
| 8th (2017) | | Ibrahim Nifar | Vafaatheri Kehiveriya | |
| 8th (2017) | | Mohamed Ikram | Insaana | |
| 8th (2017) | | Mohamed Ikram | Vaashey Mashaa Ekee | |
| 9th (2019) | | Ismail Adheel | Ill Noise | |
| 9th (2019) | | Fathuhulla Shakeel | Dhevansoora | |
| 9th (2019) | | Ismail Adheel | Hahdhu | |
| 9th (2019) | | Mohamed Ikram | Vishka | |
| 9th (2019) | | Mohamed Ikram | Vakin Loabin | |

== See also ==
- Gaumee Film Awards
