= Gaumee Film Award for Best Choreography =

- Awarded for: Best Choreography
- Country: Maldives
- Presented by: National Centre for the Arts

The Gaumee Film Award for Best Choreography is given as part of the Gaumee Film Awards for Maldivian Films.

The award was first given in 1995. Here is a list of the award winners and the nominees of the respective award ceremonies.

== Winners and nominees ==
Year	Photos of winners	Choreographer	Film	Ref(s)
1st (1995)	Not Awarded			
2nd (1997)	Not Awarded			
3rd (2007)		Waleedha Waleed		
3rd (2007)		No Other Nominee		
4th (2007)		Suneetha Ali, Ravee Farooq	Kalaayaanulaa	
4th (2007)		No Other Nominee		
5th (2008)		Fathimath Fareela	"Annaashey" – Vaaloabi Engeynama	
5th (2008)		Ravee Farooq	"Asthaa Asthaa" – Hiyani	
6th (2015)		Fathimath Nahula, Ali Yooshau, Rustham Hassan	"Mee Magey Haalathey" – Yoosuf	
6th (2015)		Ismail Jumaih	"Yaaru Kairi" – Fanaa	
6th (2015)		Yoosuf Shafeeu	"Hiyy Dhevijjey" – Niuma	
7th (2016)		Ravee Farooq	"Thiya Moonah" – Mihashin Furaana Dhandhen	
7th (2016)		Abdul Faththaah	Love Story	
7th (2016)		Abdul Faththaah	Love Story	
7th (2016)		Abdul Faththaah, Aishath Rishmy	Love Story	
8th (2017)	Not Awarded			
9th (2019)	Not Awarded			

== See also ==
- Gaumee Film Awards
