= Heylaa =

2006 Maldivian crime film written and directed by Moomin Fuad

- Official film poster
- Directed by: Moomin Fuad; Ali Shifau
- Screenplay by: Moomin Fuad
- Produced by: Mohamed Samee
- Starring: Ismail Rasheed; Ahmed Mauroof; Zeenath Abbas; Lufshan Shakeeb; Abdulla Muaz
- Cinematography: Moomin Fuad; Ali Shifau
- Edited by: Ali Shifau
- Music by: Shaaz Saeed
- Release date: 2006
- Country: Maldives
- Language: Dhivehi

Heylaa is a 2006 Maldivian crime film written and directed by Moomin Fuad. Produced by Mohamed Samee, the film stars Ismail Rasheed, Ahmed Mauroof and Zeenath Abbas in pivotal roles. Winning five Gaumee Film Awards, the film was also screened at several Film Festivals including the South Asian Film Festival Maldives, 2007.

The film narrates the story of a fourteen-year-old boy who finds himself unknowingly being involved in smuggling of a revolver. Though the film received positive reviews from critics, it was a commercial failure. The film is the first Maldivian film to be shot in high-definition digital video.

== Plot ==
Shuhaadh (Ahmed Mauroof) is a fourteen-year-old boy who has been physically and verbally abused by his father, Ahamma (Ismail Rasheed), who has been recently brought from police custody after being jailed for his involvement in drug deals. Shuhaadh, who mostly is dependent on few of his neighbors including Sobira (Aminath Shareef) and her son Ashraf (Lufshan Shakeeb), meets a mysterious man who offered to save him from his misery. The man assigns him a task, paid him beforehand and he accomplished the task where he finds himself being involved in smuggling of a revolver.

A confused Shuhaadh learns to fire it. The thought of the weapon keeps haunting him all day and he finally reveals it to Ashraf, who guides him to inform the police. Meanwhile, Ahamma was arranging a drug deal at home. Shuhaadh discovers about the deal and tries to save his father by begging him to halt the deal. Furious, Ahamma violently beats Shuhaadh, who ends up shooting and killing his father.

== Cast ==
- Ismail Rasheed as Ahamma
- Ahmed Mauroof as Shuhaadh
- Zeenath Abbas as Shahula
- Abdulla Muaz as Ayya
- Lufshan Shakeeb as Ashraf
- Aminath Shareef as Sobira
- Koyya Hassan Manik as Mufeed
- Saeedha as Sofi

== Soundtrack ==
Track listing
No.	Title	Lyrics	Singer(s)	Length
1.	"Ufaaverikan"	Abdulla Hameed Fahumy	Ford
2.	"Hirafuhaa Eevee"	Abdulla Hameed Fahumy	Ahmed Tholal

== Reception ==
According to director Shifau, the film was a learning project for the team, however the audience response was very underwhelming with less than five hundred people watching the film on screen. He believed that its commercial status was a result of casting "not very prominent" faces in the film and the "film-goers were not ready to accept the genre" at the time of release.

Ahmed Nadheem from Haveeru called the film an "awakening film" from a "drowsed industry". Satisfied with the plot twists and narration, Nadheem wrote: "There always is a lead in its narration. When a scene cuts one another, it has always been followed by a rich dialogue. Though this is directors' first project, one can clearly see their ambition and determination".

== Accolades ==
Year	Award	Category	Recipients	Result	Ref.
2008	5th Gaumee Film Awards	Best Actress	Zeenath Abbas	Nominated	
2008	5th Gaumee Film Awards	Best Supporting Actor	Ismail Rasheed	Won	
2008	5th Gaumee Film Awards	Best Supporting Actor	Lufshan Shakeeb	Nominated	
2008	5th Gaumee Film Awards	Best Child Artist	Ahmed Mauroof	Won	
2008	5th Gaumee Film Awards	Best Story	Moomin Fuad	Won	
2008	5th Gaumee Film Awards	Best Cinematography	Moomin Fuad, Ali Shifau	Won	
2008	5th Gaumee Film Awards	Best Art Direction	Moomin Fuad, Ali Shifau, Mohamed Ali	Won	
