= Ahsham (film) =

- Official film poster
- Directed by: Ali Seezan
- Screenplay by: Mahdi Ahmed; Ahmed Zareer
- Starring: Ali Seezan; Ahmed Saeed; Aminath Rishfa
- Cinematography: Shivaz Abdulla
- Edited by: Ali Seezan; Ahmed Giyas
- Music by: Ayyuman Shareef
- Production company: S Productions
- Release date: December 6, 2015
- Running time: 180 minutes
- Country: Maldives
- Language: Dhivehi
- Budget: MVR 1,500,000

Ahsham is a 2015 Maldivian action film directed and produced by Ali Seezan. Produced under the banner S Productions, the film stars Seezan, Ahmed Saeed and Aminath Rishfa in pivotal roles. The film was released on 6 November 2015, and was one of the three entries from the Maldives to the SAARC Film Festival 2016.

== Cast ==
- Ali Seezan as Ahsham
- Ahmed Saeed as Jawid
- Aminath Rishfa as Maeesha
- Zeenath Abbas as Nashidha
- Arifa Ibrahim as Haajara
- Roanu Hassan Manik as Ibrahim
- Mohamed Waheed as Faththah
- Mohamed Manik as Najeeb
- Niuma Mohamed as Ina (Special appearance)

== Development ==
Ahsham marks the first production from the S. Productions company established in 2015 and owned by the director and actor of the film, Ali Seezan. The film was made on a budget of MVR 1,500,000, and was considered to be the most expensive film made in the Maldivian film industry. It was also publicised as the most risky and challenging Maldivian film that has been released.

The first look of the film and the title was launched on 6 August 2015. Shooting of the film commenced on 9 August 2016 at Hdh. Kulhudhuffushi. It was reported that Seezan will play the role of a police inspector while Rishfa will portray the role of a nurse.

== Release and response ==
The film was initially slated for release on 6 November 2015. However, the premiere of the film was delayed since Maldives Police Service wanted to watch the film while in the process of classification as the film involves several aspects relating to their services.

The film received a mixed to positive response from critics. Ahmed Nadheem from Avas, applauded the hard work and continuous effort brought while producing the film, and for making a film on the genre which the Maldivian audience is not quite familiar with. He considered the film as a "big project" but not a "great film". "This is a very different taste to the Maldivian Film Industry. However, I do not like the film because there is no originality in the film".

== Soundtrack ==
Track listing
No.	Title	Lyrics	Music	Singer(s)	Length
1.	"Biru Filaa"	Mohamed Abdul Ghanee	Ibrahim Zaid Ali	Ahmed Ibrahim	3:07
2.	"Gandhee Huvaa"	Mohamed Abdul Ghanee	Ibrahim Zaid Ali	Ahmed Ibrahim, Mira Mohamed Majid	4:02
3.	"Loabi Vaavaru"	Mohamed Abdul Ghanee	Ibrahim Zaid Ali	Ibrahim Zaid Ali, Mariyam Ashfa	4:04
4.	Untitled	Mohamed Abdul Ghanee	Ibrahim Zaid Ali	Ibrahim Ali, Lahufa Faiz

== Accolades ==
Award	Category	Recipients	Result	Ref.
8th Gaumee Film Awards	Best film	Ahsham	Nominated	
8th Gaumee Film Awards	Best Director	Ali Seezan	Nominated	
8th Gaumee Film Awards	Best Actor	Ali Seezan	Nominated	
8th Gaumee Film Awards	Best Supporting Actor	Ahmed Saeed	Won	
8th Gaumee Film Awards	Best Supporting Actress	Zeenath Abbas	Won	
8th Gaumee Film Awards	Original Song	Ibrahim Zaid Ali for "Gandhee Huvaa"	Nominated	
8th Gaumee Film Awards	Best Lyricist	Mohamed Abdul Ghanee for "Gandhee Huvaa"	Nominated	
8th Gaumee Film Awards	Male Playback Singer	Ahmed Ibrahim for "Gandhee Huvaa"	Nominated	
8th Gaumee Film Awards	Best Female Playback Singer	Mira Mohamed Majid for "Gandhee Huvaa"	Nominated	
8th Gaumee Film Awards	Best Editing	Ali Seezan and Ahmed Giyas	Nominated	
8th Gaumee Film Awards	Best Cinematography	Shivaz Abdulla	Won	
8th Gaumee Film Awards	Best Screenplay	Mahdi Ahmed and Ahmed Zareer	Nominated	
8th Gaumee Film Awards	Best Art Direction	Ali Seezan and Ibrahim Wisan	Nominated	
8th Gaumee Film Awards	Best Costume Design	Ali Seezan	Nominated	
8th Gaumee Film Awards	Best Makeup	Zeenath Abbas	Nominated	
