= Hinithun Velaashey Kalaa =

- Official film poster
- Written by: Mahdi Ahmed
- Screenplay by: Mahdi Ahmed
- Directed by: Abdul Faththaah
- Music by: Ibrahim Nifar
- Country of origin: Maldives
- Original language: Dhivehi
- No. of seasons: 1
- No. of episodes: 52

Production
- Cinematography: Ibrahim Moosa (Ep 1-40); Ibrahim Wisan (Ep 40-52)
- Editors: Ali Musthafa; Abdul Faththaah; Mohamed Amsad
- Running time: 23-31 minutes
- Production companies: Red Productions; Dash Studio

Original release
- Release: 2006 – 2008

Hinithun Velaashey Kalaa is a Maldivian television series directed by Abdul Faththaah. Produced by Red Productions, the series stars Mariyam Afeefa, Khadheeja Ibrahim Didi and Mohamed Manik in pivotal roles. Developed as a 52-episode series, it was written by Mahdi Ahmed and narrates the journey of two best friends who are poles apart in their behavior and attitude.

== Premise ==
Fazna (Mariyam Afeefa), a diligent primary teacher and Inaya (Khadheeja Ibrahim Didi), a talkative tomboyish farmer are two childhood best friends whose attitude and behavior are wildly different. Inaya does not believe in love while Fazna rejects a passionate parent for wanting more than love from her. A drug addict, Adheel (Ibrahim Jihad) is self-exiled to their island as part of his rehabilitation program. This initiates the first rift between Inaya and Fazna as they both slowly long for him. However, this misunderstanding is soon cleared up between the friends which leads to the happy marriage of Inaya and Adheel, much to the excitement of their families and the locals.

A gossipy and straightforward shopkeeper, Raziyya (Neena Saleem) helps Fazna's elderly mother, Dhaleyka Moosa (Fauziyya Hassan) to discover her husband's infidelity which leads to Dhaleyka realizing her self-worth. Meanwhile, Adheel starts showing symptoms of his early identified disease, bronchiectasis while Inaya is pregnant to their first child. Adheel is diagnosed with lung cancer and dies at the exact time as Inaya gives birth to a healthy child. Inaya struggles to overcome the loss of her husband, while his father, Waheed (Ahmed Nimal) determines to fulfil his son's dying wish to take care of his baby at any cost.

After 15 years, Fazna and Inaya's childhood friend, Muradh (Ahmed Saeed) returns to his island after quitting his job as a sailor. Muradh, who has yearned for Fazna's love since his youth, gets help from his persuasive sister, Raziyya, to convince Dhaleyka into marrying Fazna to Muradh. Having realized that they both share similar sentiments towards each other, Fazna and Muradh get married. Fazna rejoices in her choice to marry him until her childhood crush, Aslam (Mohamed Manik) makes a surprise entrance at her wedding party. Realizing that Fazna's feelings for Aslam still remain the same and unchanged, Muradh's insecurities increase which leads him to suspect Aslam and Fazna and ultimately turn into an aggressive and violent husband. He punishes her by forcing her to quit school, and Muradh along with his sister Raziyya rejoice on accomplishing the first stage of their mission, which is to deprive Fazna of contentment.

Following the tempering of his witnesses; Ishaq, Raziyya and Murad, Waheed wins his case for the custody of Inaya's son, Shizan, which leads her to be mentally disturbed. An empowering speech by the island's council makes Fazna identify her self-worth and finally speak up against her husband who in return divorces her in rage. Soon after their separation, Fazna bonds with Aslam and tries to confess her feelings towards him on several occasions until she admits defeat as Aslam's girlfriend, Leeza (Aishath Siyadha) makes a surprise visit to Aslam.

== Cast ==
=== Main ===
- Mariyam Afeefa as Fazna
- Khadheeja Ibrahim Didi as Inaya
- Mohamed Manik as Aslam
- Fauziyya Hassan as Dhaleyka Moosa; Fazna's mother
- Neena Saleem as Raziyya; a shopkeeper
- Ahmed Saeed as Ibrahim Muraadh
- Ibrahim Jihad as Adheel
- Ahmed Nimal as Waheed; Adheel's father
- Aishath Siyadha as Leeza; Aslam's girlfriend
- Koyya Hassan Manik as Samad; Leeza's father
- Ali Waheed as Ahmed Zameel; a lawyer and father of Aana

=== Recurring role ===
- Mohamed Waheed as Haroon; Inaya's father
- Aishath Rasheedha as Hareera; Aslam's mother
- Ahmed Shah as Hassan Zareer; headmaster of the school
- Mariyam Nisha as Zubeydha; Adheel's mother
- Abdulla Niham as Husham
- Aishath Nish'ath as Amira
- Aishath Haneen as Aana
- Mohamed Shizan Zabeer as Shizan
- Ahmed Isharu as Shahid; Leeza's ex-boyfriend
- Thahumeena Adam as Jauza; Ahmed Zameel's secretary
- Ali Riyaz as Moadey
- Moosa Nazeem as Adam
- Ahmed Abdul Rahman as Ahmed Zubeir

=== Guest ===
- Maisoon as Young Fazna
- Hamdha as Young Inaya
- Sajid as Young Aslam
- Iqbal as Young Muraadh
- Mohamed Afrah as a doctor (Episode 12)
- Mariyam Shakeela as Mufeedha; principal of Aana (Episode 43)
- Zeenath Abbas as Hana; Shahid's girlfriend (Episode 44)
- Mohamed Rasheed as Waheed's lawyer (Episode 50, 52)
- Arifa Ibrahim as Zubeir's wife (Episode 52)
- Nadhiya Hassan as Fazna (Episode 52)

== Development ==
Following the success of his previous drama series, director Abdul Faththaah met with screenwriter Mahdi Ahmed to discuss developing a screenplay for a drama series of fifty-two episodes. As instructed by Faththaah, the first thirty-two episodes of the series were written to be filmed in HA. Kelaa while the rest of the series was to be filmed in Male'. However, after the editing process, the first schedule of the series was prolonged for a runtime of forty episodes which led Mahdi to cut and change several scenes from the second schedule of the film to fit into twelve episodes. In the 39th episode, it recreates a historical event where Bulhaa Faathuma performs Gon Jehun, on Mohamed Thakurufaanu on Kandhuvalu Magu. The scene was recreated on the same street where actors Mohamed Manik and Aishath Siyadha played the respective roles with reference to available historical accuracy.

== Soundtrack ==
Track listing
No.	Title	Lyrics	Music	Singer(s)	Length
1.	"Hinithun Velaashey Kalaa" (Title Track)	Mohamed Abdul Ghanee	Ibrahim Nifar	Mukhthar Adam	4:34
2.	"Hinithun Velaashey Kalaa" (Opening Track)	Mohamed Abdul Ghanee	Ibrahim Nifar	Mohamed Abdul Ghanee	1:18

== Response ==
Upon release, the series received mainly positive reviews from critics and audience, where the writing, direction, cinematography and performance of the actors were highlighted. Ahmed Adhushan from Mihaaru picked the series as one of the best television series developed in Maldives and noted that "along with the title track, this is definitely most accomplished work by director Abdul Faththaah". Similarly, in a review, Aishath Ashraf from Avas opined that the series cemented Afeefa's position as a lead actress and she has proved her camera friendliness, where she "made sure that the audience cry every time she does". Further in her writing, Ashraf believed that the series made its mark in popularizing Pakistani dress, which became a fashion element locally during its time of release.
