= Ill Noise =

- Official film poster
- Directed by: Ismail Nihad
- Written by: Mohamed Munthasir
- Screenplay by: Ahmed Mauroof Jameel
- Produced by: Mohamed Munthasir
- Starring: Mohamed Munthasir; Ahmed Alam; Shammath Ibrahim; Ahmed Nimal
- Cinematography: Vishal Amir Ahmed
- Edited by: Ahmed Sajid
- Music by: Ismail Adheel
- Production companies: Theatre Mirage; Orkeyz Inc
- Release date: April 27, 2017
- Running time: 100 minutes
- Country: Maldives
- Language: English

Ill Noise is a 2017 Maldivian film directed by Ismail Nihad. Produced under Theatre Mirage and Orkeyz Inc, the film stars Mohamed Munthasir, Ahmed Alam, Shammath Ibrahim, Judh Mohamed Munthasir and Ahmed Nimal in a pivotal role. The film was based on a theatre play performed by Munthasir in 2012. It was released on 27 April 2017.

== Premise ==
Amid a global pandemic caused by a mysterious disease, Edward Benevic, a disgraced microbiologist, seeks refuge within the last institution willing to harbor him. His sole obsession is the ailing man lying beside him, who happens to be his mentor, Novels. Edward lacks the resources he once had when he initially uncovered the enigmatic parasite responsible for the outbreak. Now, he faces a daunting challenge: maintaining Novels' deteriorating health until the highly restricted vaccine arrives. This desperate mission comes at a high cost, causing a rift between Edward and his wife and son. As the world crumbles outside, Edward plunges deeper into the secrets of the IASP pathogen, realizing that its horrifying symptoms may be more than just physical in nature.

== Cast ==
- Mohamed Munthasir as Edward Benevic / Adam Jaufar Issac
- Ahmed Alam as Professor Novels
- Shammath Ibrahim as Stephanie / Sarah
- Judh Mohamed Munthasir as Junior
- Ahmed Nimal as Dr. Ahmed Nimal
- Shaaz Saeed as an attendant

== Release ==
The film was initially slated for release on 23 March 2017. Due to the alarming spread of viral and swine flu in the Maldives, the release date was postponed to 27 April 2017.

== Accolades ==
Award	Category	Recipient(s) and nominee(s)	Result	Ref(s)
9th Gaumee Film Awards	Best film	Ill Noise	Nominated	
9th Gaumee Film Awards	Best Director	Ismail Nihad	Nominated	
9th Gaumee Film Awards	Best Actor	Mohamed Munthasir	Nominated	
9th Gaumee Film Awards	Best Editing	Ahmed Sajid	Nominated	
9th Gaumee Film Awards	Best Cinematography	Vishal Amir Ahmed	Nominated	
9th Gaumee Film Awards	Best Screenplay	Ahmed Mauroof Jameel	Nominated	
9th Gaumee Film Awards	Best Background Music	Ismail Adheel	Won	
9th Gaumee Film Awards	Best Art Direction	Adam Mufassir	Nominated	
9th Gaumee Film Awards	Best Costume Design	Adam Munthasir	Nominated	
9th Gaumee Film Awards	Best Sound Editing	Ismail Adheel	Nominated	
