= Gaumee Film Award for Best Film =

Gaumee Film Award

- Awarded for: Best Film
- Country: Maldives
- Presented by: National Centre for the Arts

The Gaumee Film Award for Best Film is given as part of the Gaumee Film Awards for Maldivian Films.

The award was first given in 1995. Here is a list of the award winners and the nominees of the award ceremonies.

== Winners and nominees ==
Table key
Indicates the winner

=== Feature film ===
Year	Film	Production studio	Ref(s)
1st (1995)	Dheriyaa	Club Scope	
1st (1995)	No Other Nominee		
2nd (1997)	Haqqu	Bukhari Films	
2nd (1997)	No Other Nominee		
3rd (2007)	Amaanaaiy	Eternal Pictures	
3rd (2007)	No Other Nominee		
4th (2007)	Vehey Vaarey Therein	Motion Pictures	
4th (2007)	Kalaayaanulaa	Mapa	
4th (2007)	Zuleykha	Mapa	
5th (2008)	Vaaloabi Engeynama	Red Production	
5th (2008)	No Other Nominee		
6th (2015)	Happy Birthday	Dark Rain Entertainment	
6th (2015)	Niuma	Dhekedheke Ves Production	
6th (2015)	Veeraana	Dhekedheke Ves Production	
6th (2015)	Yoosuf	Crystal Entertainment	
6th (2015)	Zalzalaa En'buri Aun	Nims Movies	
7th (2016)	Loodhifa	Noor N Movies	
7th (2016)	Fathis Handhuvaruge Feshun 3D	Dark Rain Entertainment	
7th (2016)	Ingili	R2, KID Production, T for 2 Production	
7th (2016)	Love Story	Noor N Movies	
7th (2016)	Sazaa	Farivaa Films, KID Production	
8th (2017)	Vaashey Mashaa Ekee	Dark Rain Entertainment	
8th (2017)	Ahsham	S Productions	
8th (2017)	Emme Fahu Vindha Jehendhen	Dark Rain Entertainment	
8th (2017)	Hulhudhaan	Dark Rain Entertainment	
8th (2017)	Mikoe Bappa Baey Baey	Dark Rain Entertainment	
9th (2019)	Vishka	Yaaraa Productions	
9th (2019)	Hahdhu	Red Production	
9th (2019)	Dhevansoora	My Dream Productions	
9th (2019)	Ill Noise	Orkeyz Inc	
9th (2019)	Vakin Loabin	Dark Rain Entertainment	

== See also ==
- Gaumee Film Awards
