= Badi Edhuru =

- Official film poster
- Directed by: Ali Shifau
- Written by: Moomin Fuad
- Produced by: Mohamed Ali
- Starring: Ismail Rasheed; Abdulla Muaz; Ibrahim Jihad; Ravee Farooq; Aishath Siyadha; Nadhiya Hassan
- Cinematography: Moomin Fuad
- Edited by: Moomin Fuad; Ali Shifau
- Production companies: The Factory; Bullarcher; Dark Rain Entertainment; Noor Movies
- Release date: December 29, 2007
- Running time: 63 minutes
- Country: Maldives
- Language: Dhivehi

Badi Edhuru is a 2007 Maldivian suspense thriller short film directed by Ali Shifau. Produced by Mohamed Ali and written by Moomin Fuad, the film stars Ismail Rasheed, Abdulla Muaz, Ibrahim Jihad, Ravee Farooq, Aishath Siyadha and Nadhiya Hassan in pivotal roles.

== Premise ==
A group of six friends ordered a pizza, where the members started teasing Fazna (Nadhiya Hassan) as phasmophobic, though none of the members, except for Suheil, believes that ghosts do really exist. To validate Suehil's point, they agree to perform a ritual called "Badi Edhuru" where the ghost shall appear if they pronounce the phrase thrice in a row. Soon after, the friends leave the house and they all start experiencing horror incidents. At first, disguised as Nafiu, Farish is killed by throwing him from the terrace of his seven-storey building. Hudha, a daughter from a conservative family, is approached and killed by Badi Edhuru in disguise as her boyfriend, Nizam, by bleeding her to death. Him being the next target, dies in a road accident while Fazna is murdered by drowning her into the sea in a low tide. Suheil, who comes home after dropping Fazu, finds a videotape which shows Badi Edhuru in a corner after the friends performed the ritual is killed by stabbing himself to death.

The only member of the friends, Nasih (Ismail Rasheed), who did not participate in the ritual, is approached by Police where he is interrogated as the prime suspect for the murder of his friends. The behavior of the victims and their crime scene does not correlate which makes him anxious on their cause of death, while the Police believes he has a major contribution in their murder. Nasih begins to recollect the memory of that night where he, himself perform the ritual while in police custody.

== Cast ==
- Ismail Rasheed as Nasih
- Abdulla Muaz as Mohamed Suheil
- Ibrahim Jihad as Hussain Farish
- Ravee Farooq as Moosa Nizam
- Aishath Siyadha as Fathimath Hudha Naeem
- Nadhiya Hassan as Mariyam Fazna
- Ali Shameel as an Investigation Officer
- Aminath Shareef as Hudha's mother
- Lirar Azwar Naeem as a Police Officer
- Abdulla Firash as Pizza Delivery Boy
- Hussain Jameel as a Police Officer
- Mohamed Ailam as a Police Officer
- Abdulla Naseer as Lorry Driver
- Mohamed Sobah as Badi Edhuru

== Soundtrack ==
Track listing
No.	Title	Lyrics	Music	Singer(s)	Length
1.	"Theme Song"	Abdulla Hameed Fahumy	Abdulla Moosa Rafeeu	Moomin Fuad

== Response ==
The film was released on 29 December 2007 to positive reviews from critics where the direction, cinematography and performance of the actors were highlighted, where it was considered a positive change in the local cinema of melodrama. Aminath Luba from Sun praised the technical aspects of the film and it molded a folk story into a modern scene. The film was later made available for streaming on Baiskoafu application on 30 October 2019.

== Accolades ==
Year	Award	Category	Nominated work	Result	Ref(s)
2008	2nd Miadhu Crystal Award	Best Director	Ali Shifau	Won	
2008	2nd Miadhu Crystal Award	Best Visual Effects	Mohamed Shahulee, Ismail Haikal	Won	
2008	2nd Miadhu Crystal Award	Best Editing	Ali Shifau	Won	
