= Hama Himeyn =

2004 Maldivian film

- Official film poster
- Directed by: Ahmed Nimal
- Written by: Mahdi Ahmed
- Screenplay by: Mahdi Ahmed
- Produced by: Sama; Ziya
- Starring: Ali Seezan; Khadheeja Ibrahim Didi; Nashidha Mohamed
- Cinematography: Hassan Haleem
- Edited by: Hassan Haleem
- Music by: Imad Ismail
- Production company: Corona Arts
- Release date: July 5, 2004
- Country: Maldives
- Language: Dhivehi

Hama Himeyn is a 2004 Maldivian film directed by Ahmed Nimal. Produced by Sama and Ziya under Corona Arts, the film stars Ali Seezan, Khadheeja Ibrahim Didi and Nashidha Mohamed in pivotal roles. The story of the film was written in 1998 by Mahdi Ahmed and re-written with a modern perspective when director Ahmed Nimal shared his intention to direct a film for his story.

== Premise ==
Several years later, Aminath (Niuma Mohamed) returns from Madras after completing her studies and meets her ex-boyfriend, Faisal (Ali Seezan) who is now married to an emotionally immature wife, Fazeela (Khadheeja Ibrahim Didi). As the film moves forward, Faisal's past life as a drug addict unfolds. Faisal shows up drunk at Aminath's birthday party where he ends their relationship and attacks his father Zahir (Chilhiya Moosa Manik) at home. He was then exiled to another island where he meets Fazeela and her aunt, Nashidha (Nashidha Mohamed).

== Cast ==
- Ali Seezan as Faisal
- Khadheeja Ibrahim Didi as Fazeela
- Nashidha Mohamed as Nashidha
- Ali Shameel as Adnan
- Niuma Mohamed as Aminath
- Chilhiya Moosa Manik as Zahir
- Mohamed Manik as Muruthala
- Shameema as Faisal's mother
- Ahmed Nimal as Habeeb; Nashidha's husband
- Ahmed Latheef as Nashidha
- Saiman
- Ahmed Azmeel as Ibrahim; a friend of Faisal
- Yoosuf Shafeeu as Dr. Ibrahim (special appearance)

== Soundtrack ==
Track listing
No.	Title	Lyrics	Singer(s)	Length
1.	"Hithah Feney"	Coco Hassan Haleem	Mohamed Fazeel, Fathimath Zoona	5:14
2.	"Loabin Heeleema Hithaa"	Coco Hassan Haleem	Mohamed Fazeel, Aishath Inaya	4:56
3.	"Adhugaa Nethey Ufaleh"	Coco Hassan Haleem	Aishath Inaya	3:31

== Response ==
Upon release, the film received mixed to negative reviews from critics and did average business at boxoffice. In an interview, screenwriter Mahdi Ahmed shared his dissatisfaction towards his writing standards in the film and shared his experience of watching the movie in cinema as an "embarrassing" moment.
