= Gaumee Film Award for Best Art Direction =

Film award

- Awarded for: Best Art Direction
- Country: Maldives
- Presented by: National Centre for the Arts

The Gaumee Film Award for Best Art Direction is given as part of the Gaumee Film Awards for Maldivian Films.

The award was first given in 1995. Here is a list of the award winners and the nominees of the respective award ceremonies.

== Winners and nominees ==
Year	Photos of winners	Art Director	Film	Ref(s)
1st (1995)	Not Awarded			
2nd (1997)	Not Awarded			
3rd (2007)	Not Awarded			
4th (2007)		Abdul Faththaah	Vehey Vaarey Therein	
4th (2007)		No Other Nominee		
5th (2008)		Moomin Fuad, Ali Shifau	Heylaa	
5th (2008)		No Other Nominee		
6th (2015)		Fathimath Nahula	Yoosuf	
6th (2015)		Ibrahim Moosa	Niuma	
6th (2015)		Ahmed Nimal	Zalzalaa En'buri Aun	
6th (2015)		Moomin Fuad, Ali Shifau, Mohamed Ali	Happy Birthday	
6th (2015)		Mohamed Ali, Ali Shifau	Dhin Veynuge Hithaamaigaa	
7th (2016)		Moomin Fuad, Hussain Munawwar, Ismail Rasheed	Loodhifa	
7th (2016)		Ravee Farooq, Mahdi Ahmed, Hussain Munawwar	Ingili	
7th (2016)		Abdul Faththaah	Love Story	
7th (2016)		Hussain Munawwar	Sazaa	
7th (2016)		Ali Shifau, Mohamed Ali	Fathis Handhuvaruge Feshun 3D	
8th (2017)		Mohamed Ali, Ali Shifau	Vaashey Mashaa Ekee	
8th (2017)		Aishath Fuad Thaufeeq, Mohamed Ali	Hulhudhaan	
8th (2017)		Ali Seezan, Ibrahim Wisan	Ahsham	
8th (2017)		Mohamed Ali, Ali Shifau	Emme Fahu Vindha Jehendhen	
8th (2017)		Mohamed Ali, Ravee Farooq, Ali Shifau	Mikoe Bappa Baey Baey	
9th (2019)		Ahmed Mohamed Imad	Vishka	
9th (2019)		Adam Mufassir	Ill Noise	
9th (2019)		Abdul Faththaah	Hahdhu	
9th (2019)		Yoosuf Shafeeu	Dhevansoora	
9th (2019)		Ali Shifau, Mohamed Ali, Aishath Fuad Thaufeeq	Vakin Loabin	

== See also ==
- Gaumee Film Awards
