= Ravee Farooq =

Maldivian actor, director

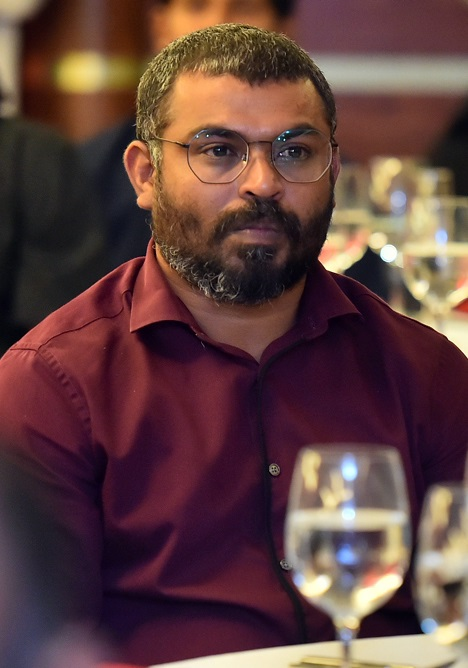
- Farooq at Niuma Mohamed's Silver Jubilee celebration event, 2019
- Born: 23 April 1982 (age 44)
- Occupations: Actor, director, editor and choreographer
- Years active: 1998–present
- Spouse(s): Lahfa Faix Fathimath Riva Hussain Aishath Rishmy Aishath Namy
- Children: 2

Ravee Farooq (born 23 April 1982) is a Maldivian actor, director, editor and choreographer.

== Career ==
Farooq made his film debut with Abdul Faththaah-directed romantic disaster film, Hureemey Inthizaarugaa (2005) cast along with Mariyam Zuhura, Waleedha Waleed, Ibrahim Jihad and Neena Saleem. The film, heavily relied on the effect of the 2004 Indian Ocean earthquake on the Maldives, received favorable reviews from critics though it failed to perform financially. Farooq played the disrespectful husband who chose wealth above his family. His performance won a Miadhu Crystal Award for the Best Male Newcomer.

In April 2006, Ahmed Nimal's revenge thriller Hiyani was released which featured Farooq as the kidnapper who constantly flirts with a rich married woman. The film which primarily focuses on a wealthy troublesome couple whose possessions have been exposed by the disappearance of the husband, was mostly received positively by the critics. At 5th Gaumee Film Awards, Farooq was nominated as the Best Actor and Choreographer for his work in the film while he was bestowed with the Best Choreography award for the song "Asthaa Asthaa" at 1st Miadhu Crystal Awards.

In 2008, Farooq appeared as the cunning brother-in-law in Fathimath Nahula's romantic drama film, Yoosuf which depicts the story of a deaf and mute man (played by Yoosuf Shafeeu) who has been mistreated by a wealthy family, mocking his disability. Featuring an ensemble cast including Yoosuf Shafeeu, Niuma Mohamed, Sheela Najeeb, Ahmed Nimal, Mohamed Manik, Fauziyya Hassan, Zeenath Abbas and Ahmed Lais Asim, the film is considered to include most prominent faces in a Maldivian film. The film received widespread critical acclaim and was attained a blockbuster status at box office. A total of forty five housefull shows were screened at Olympus Cinema before the film was leaked online, however the producers were able to screen five more shows at the cinema making it one of the Maldivian all-time highest grossing movies. The film was Maldivian official entry at 2009 SAARC Film Festivals and holds the privilege of being the opening movie of the festival.

Farooq's first release of 2010 was Ali Shifau-directed family drama Dhin Veynuge Hithaamaigaa where he played the role of Jana, a photographer who gave a breakthrough to Nisha, played by Niuma Mohamed. The film showcases discrimination against the islanders, family revenge and fatherhood responsibilities. The film and his performance received positive response from critics. The film was believed to be a "huge improvement" over the recent Maldivian films. Being able to screen fifteen housefull shows of the film, it was declared to be a commercial success. He reunited with Niuma Mohamed and Ali Seezan in Amjad Ibrahim's romantic horror film Vakinuvinama which was a critical and commercial failure.

The following year, he played the role of Imran, a spoiled kid who is envious of his step-mother, in Moomin Fuad-directed crime tragedy drama Loodhifa (2011). Featuring an ensemble cast, the film deals with current social issues in the society told from different perspectives of the characters. Made on a budget of MVR 600,000, the film was declared a commercial failure though it received wide critical acclaim, praising the performance of cast and the film's "realism" in its language, characters and their attitude. His portrayal garnered him a Gaumee Film Award for Best Supporting Actor.

Farooq was more involved in film direction for the next two years. In 2012, he directed Fathimath Nahula produced romantic drama Mihashin Furaana Dhandhen which features Niuma Mohamed, Mohamed Manik and Ali Seezan in pivotal roles. In an interview he mentioned that the film primarily based on a dramatic theme and he considered his experience to be "merely satisfying" while it is different than his previous directorial ventures. Upon release, the film received mixed response from critics while his work was recognised positively. Ahmed Nadheem of Haveeru noted the film as "the best Maldivian melodramatic film" he had seen in the past two years, though displeased with its similarities between two Bollywood films. In 2013, Farooq directed critically acclaimed experimental suspense thriller Ingili which features Ismail Rasheed and Abdulla Muaz. It was based on fourteen-year-old Mohamed Hassaan's National Award-winning short story, Holhuasheege Ekuveriya. It celebrates the first Maldivian film to get recognized internationally by winning Bronze Medal in Best Feature Film category at SAARC Film Festival 2014 held in Colombo, Sri Lanka. At the 7th Gaumee Film Awards, Farooq received several nominations for his work in the film, including Best Director, Best Editing, Best Art Direction, Best Costume Design and Best Makeup. At 3rd Maldives Film Awards, Farooq received two nominations for Best Director, from Ingili and Mihashin Furaana Dhandhen, while winning the award for latter.

In 2014, Farooq appeared as a doctor in the Ali Aishath Fuwad Thowfeek-directed Hulhudhaan alongside Mariyam Majudha and Roanu Hassan Manik which garnered critical success. The film was later screened at the Venice Film Festival. The following year, Farooq directed the suspense thriller film Mikoe Bappa Baey Baey which stars Mohamed Manik and Aishath Rishmy in pivotal roles. The film along with his direction was critically acclaimed. It was one of the three entries from the Maldives at the SAARC Film Festival in 2016. At the 8th Gaumee Film Awards Farooq received five nominations, including a Best Supporting Actor and Best Editing award nomination for Hulhudhaan and a Best Director, Best Art Direction and Best Editing award nomination for Mikoe Bappa Baey Baey.

In 2017, Farooq portrayed Ishan, a criminal who sought guidance from Vishka, played by Aishath Rishmy, in his crime thriller Vishka; it marked his second collaboration with Rishmy. Prior to release, it faced controversies as Hassan Haleel requested a deferment in its release claiming he allegedly owns the story and script of the film. However, the film was cleared for exhibition with the court order proclaiming that the ownership of the script and story belongs to Rishmy. Upon release, the film opened to a positive response from critics. Mohamed Musthafa of the Sun applauded its "unexpected climax" and Ravi's "exceptional work" in acting, directing and editing. Echoing similar sentiments, Ahmed Nadheem of Avas opined his acting to be "per excellence, and beyond Maldivian cinematic standards". The film was screened at the SAARC Film Festival in 2017.

2018 was a dull year for Maldivian film-industry with regard to 2018 Maldivian presidential election. Farooq's only release of the year was the first Maldivian web-series, a romantic drama by Fathimath Nahula, Huvaa. The series consisting of sixty episodes and streamed through the digital platform Baiskoafu, centers around a happy and radiant family which breaks into despairing pieces after a tragic incident that led to an unaccountable loss. The series and his performance as a young man trying to win the love of a divorcee were positively received.

Later during the year, first Maldivian anthology film was released which credited Farooq as the director of the segment titled Gaathil which revolves around murder of a premature baby and a grown-up man. The project was filmed in 2013 and digitally released six years later due to several delays in post-production, where the producer of the film criticizes Farooq for "failing" to complete his segment during the stipulated time period took over the project from Farooq which he considered as an act of a "personal vendetta" against him.

== Media image ==
In 2018, he was ranked in the sixth position from Dho?'s list of Top Ten Actor of Maldives.

== Personal life ==
Farooq first married Lahfa Faiz, a vocalist and the couple got divorced after a few years. He later married Fathimath Riva Hussain and had two boys. On 8 January 2009, his wife gave birth to their first son, Hussain Ruvau Ravee and on 11 April 2013, she gave birth to their second child, Ali Ravaih Ravee before the couple got divorced few months later. He then started a relationship with Aishath Rishmy. On 25 March 2019, Farooq and Rishmy married without publicity. On 9 February 2022, Rameez announced their divorce through her social media account.

== Filmography ==
=== Feature film ===
Year	Title	Role	Notes	Ref(s)
1998	Ethoofaaneerey	Habeeb	Special appearance	
1998	Amaanaaiy	Fairooz's friend	Special appearance	
2001	Dheevaanaa	Himself	Special appearance in the song "Hiyy Masthu Ishq"	
2003	Kalaayaanulaa	Sam	Special appearance in the song "Nudhaaney Mireyge Han'dhaanthah"	
2005	Hureemey Inthizaarugaa	Shafiu		
2006	Hiyani	Ziyan	Nominated—Gaumee Film Award for Best Actor	
2008	Yoosuf	Riyaz		
2010	Dhin Veynuge Hithaamaigaa	Jana		
2010	Vakinuvinama	Ihusan		
2011	Loodhifa	Imran	Gaumee Film Award for Best Supporting Actor	
2014	Hulhudhaan	Dr. Asif	Nominated—Gaumee Film Award for Best Supporting Actor	
2017	Vishka	Ishan	Also the director Nominated—Gaumee Film Award for Best Director; Nominated—Gaumee Film Award for Best Actor	
2021	Faree	Faidh		
2023	Hindhukolheh	Abdulla Shahid		
2023	Nina	Himself	Special appearance	
2024	Kanbalhi	Areesh		
2024	Fureytha	Zulal		
2024	Lasviyas	Himself		
2024	Roboman: The Movie	Judge	Special appearance	
2025	Alifaan	Ibrahim	Also the co-director and co-editor	

=== Television ===
Year	Title	Role	Notes	Ref(s)
2004	Thiyey Mihithuge Vindhakee	Shaukath	Guest role; "Episode 16"	
2009	Mohamma Gaadiyaa	Himself	Guest role; "Episode 1"	
2018–2019	Huvaa	Azim	Main role; 67 episodes Also the editor	
2019	Hatharu Halha	Himself	Also the director of the segment Gaathil; Special appearance	
2020	Ehenas	Sohail	Also the director and editor Guest role; Episode: "Consent"	
2021–2022	Mazloom	Zaki	Main role	
2022	Biruveri Vaahaka	Qalib	Main role; 5 episodes	
2022	Gudhan	Aisth's friend	Recurring role; 2 episodes	
2023	Mirai	MP Yaugoob	Recurring role; 2 episodes	
2023	Fandu	Irfan	Guest role; Episode: "Concealed"	
2023	Hama Emme Meehekey	Ahmed Ameen Saleem	Main role; 10 episodes	
2024	Dark Rain Chronicles	Ali Zayan	Main role in the segment "Lafzu"	
2024	Vihaali	Zuheyru	Main role in the segment "Khadheeja"	
2025	Hinthaa	Azhar	Recurring role; 4 episodes Also the director	

=== Short film ===
Year	Title	Role	Notes	Ref(s)
2005	Falhi Sikunthu 2	Himself	Special appearance in the song "Sissaali Dhanvaru"	
2006	Dheke Dhekeves 4	Himself	Special appearance in the song "Bigaraa Ey"	
2006	Haa Shaviyani Rasgefaanu 2		Also the director	
2007	Badi Edhuru	Moosa Nizam		
2008	Erey	Shaafy	Also the director and editor	
2020	KKB: Kuda Kuda Baaru	Ibrahim's son		
2020	Thadhu	Ahmed Ibrahim		
2021	Gulhun	Irfan		
2024	Aimi	Hamza		

=== Other work ===
Year	Title	Director	Screenplay	Editor	Notes	Ref(s)
2005	Dheke Dhekeves 2	Yes	Yes	Yes	Short film	
2005	Falhi Sikunthu 2	Yes			Short film	
2006	Dheke Dhekeves 4			Yes	Short film	
2006	Haa Shaviyani Rasgefaanu 2	Yes			Short film	
2012	Mihashin Furaana Dhandhen	Yes			Feature film	
2013	Ingili	Yes		Yes	Feature film	
2015	Mikoe Bappa Baey Baey	Yes		Yes	Feature film	
2017	Vishka	Yes		Yes	Feature film	
2017	Bos			Yes	Feature film	
2018–2019	Huvaa			Yes	Web series	
2019–2020	Ehenas	Yes		Yes	Web series	
2021	Hatharu Manzaru	Yes	Yes	Yes	Segment "Hayaai"	
2022	Bridge			Yes	Web series; 10 episodes	
2025	Alifaan	Yes		Yes	Feature film	
TBA	Goanaa	Yes		Yes	Feature film	

== Discography ==
Year	Album/Film	Track	Co-artist(s)	Ref(s)
2013	Tharinge Rey 2013	"Loabi Loabi Thiya Heelun"	Mariyam Ashfa	
2014	Tharinge Rey 2014	"Ummeedhu"	Lahufa Faiz	
2017	Vishka	"Aadhey Miadhu Dhaan"	Mariyam Rifqa	
2017	Vishka	"Vishka (Title song)"	Mariyam Rifqa, Soppe	
2017	Vishka	"Kastholhu" (Male)		

== Accolades ==
Year	Award	Category	Nominated work	Result	Ref(s)
2007	1st Miadhu Crystal Awards	Best Newcomer (Male)	Hureemey Inthizaarugaa	Won	
2007	1st Miadhu Crystal Awards	Best Choreography	"Asthaa Asthaa" – Hiyani	Won	
2007	4th Gaumee Film Awards	Best Choreography	Kalaayaanulaa (Shared with Suneetha Ali)	Won	
2007	4th Gaumee Film Awards	Best Director — Short film	Falhi Sikunthu 2	Won	
2008	5th Gaumee Film Awards	Best Actor	Hiyani	Nominated	
2008	5th Gaumee Film Awards	Best Choreography	"Asthaa Asthaa" – Hiyani	Nominated	
2014	3rd Maldives Film Awards	Best Director	Ingili	Won	
2014	3rd Maldives Film Awards	Best Director	Mihashin Furaana Dhandhen	Nominated	
2014	3rd Maldives Film Awards	Best Choreography	Mihashin Furaana Dhandhen	Nominated	
2014	3rd Maldives Film Awards	Best Art Direction	Ingili (Shared with Mahdi Ahmed, Hussain Munawwar)	Won	
2014	3rd Maldives Film Awards	Best Editing	Ingili	Nominated	
2016	7th Gaumee Film Awards	Best Director	Ingili	Nominated	
2016	7th Gaumee Film Awards	Best Supporting Actor	Loodhifa	Won	
2016	7th Gaumee Film Awards	Best Editing	Ingili	Nominated	
2016	7th Gaumee Film Awards	Best Art Direction	Ingili (Shared with Mahdi Ahmed and Hussain Munawwar)	Nominated	
2016	7th Gaumee Film Awards	Best Choreography	Mihashin Furaana Dhandhen	Won	
2016	7th Gaumee Film Awards	Best Costume Design	Ingili (Shared with Mahdi Ahmed)	Nominated	
2016	7th Gaumee Film Awards	Best Makeup	Ingili (Shared with Hussain Munawwar)	Nominated	
2017	8th Gaumee Film Awards	Best Director	Mikoe Bappa Baey Baey	Nominated	
2017	8th Gaumee Film Awards	Best Supporting Actor	Hulhudhaan	Nominated	
2017	8th Gaumee Film Awards	Best Editing	Hulhudhaan (Shared with Ahmed Shakir, Ahmed Sinan, Mohamed Faisal)	Nominated	
2017	8th Gaumee Film Awards	Best Editing	Mikoe Bappa Baey Baey	Nominated	
2017	8th Gaumee Film Awards	Best Art Direction	Mikoe Bappa Baey Baey (Shared with Mohamed Ali and Ali Shifau)	Nominated	
2019	9th Gaumee Film Awards	Best Director	Vishka	Nominated	
2019	9th Gaumee Film Awards	Best Actor	Vishka	Nominated	
2019	9th Gaumee Film Awards	Best Editing	Vishka	Nominated	
