= Sazaa (2011 film) =

- Official film poster
- Directed by: Hussain Munawwar
- Written by: Mahdi Ahmed
- Screenplay by: Mahdi Ahmed
- Produced by: Mahumaa Hussain Rasheed
- Starring: Niuma Mohamed; Lufshan Shakeeb; Ismail Rasheed
- Edited by: Ali Musthafa
- Music by: Mohamed Ikram
- Production companies: Farivaa Films; KID Production
- Release date: March 29, 2011
- Running time: 140 minutes
- Country: Maldives
- Language: Dhivehi

Sazaa (transl. Punishment) is a 2011 Maldivian romantic-drama film directed by Hussain Munawwar. Produced by Hussain Rasheed, the film stars Niuma Mohamed and Lufshan Shakeeb in the lead roles while Ismail Rasheed in the supporting role. The film was theatrically released on 29 March 2011.

== Premise ==
Reema (Niuma Mohamed), a carefree and cheerful young woman, visits her island B. Maalhos for holidays, where she meets Zaid (Lufshan Shakeeb), a land surveyor from Male'. Initially, their encounter sparks mutual dislike, and they engage in playful teasing and pranks whenever their paths intersect. On one such incident, Zaid gets admitted at hospital and out of guilt and worry, Reema decides to confess her love to him. To her surprise, Zaid reciprocates her feelings, and they embark on a romantic journey together. Soon after, Zaid has to go Male' to submit the survey reports to head office and promises Reema to return in three days. However, as he leaves, Reema loses connection with Zaid but impatiently wait for his return. Days turn to weeks and weeks to months. While Reema waits desperately, she sees her life changing unexpectedly as if fate has other plans for her.

== Cast ==
- Lufshan Shakeeb as Zaid
- Niuma Mohamed as Reema
- Ismail Rasheed as Ahammaa
- Fathimath Azifa as Zeena
- Ajnaz Ali as Adil
- Nashidha Mohamed as Zubeidha
- Mariyam Haleem as Faathuma
- Idhris Mohamed as Moosa
- Khadheeja Ahmed as Sofiyya

== Production ==
=== Development ===
Kid Productions and Fariva Films acquired the story rights from Mariyam Moosa. Shortly before their scheduled departure to film in B. Maalhos, director Hussain Munawwar entrusted the script to Mahdi Ahmed for refinements. Ahmed proposed a complete rewrite of the screenplay to enhance character development, ultimately delivering a more engaging cinematic experience. Munawwar, recognizing the potential improvements, postponed the crew's departure by an additional fifteen days to accommodate Ahmed's revisions. While preserving the fundamental plot, Ahmed overhauled the screenplay by introducing significant changes to character arcs, culminating in a surprising twist at the story's conclusion. He completed this substantial rewrite within a week and returned the screenplay to Munawwar.

=== Casting ===
Just two days before the scheduled departure, director Munawwar faced challenges in accommodating certain requests from the original cast. Acting on the advice of the film's technical consultant, Mohamed Niyaz, Munawwar made significant changes to the cast. These changes included bringing in Ismail Rasheed to play the role of the villain and casting Lufshan Shakeeb in the lead role. This film marks Shakeeb's only appearance as the lead actor in a feature film.

=== Filming ===
The film crew embarked on their journey to B. Maalhos for filming on 22 April 2010, equipped with the initial two parts of the screenplay. During this time, Ahmed continued working on the remaining arc of the screenplay in Male'. The filming process was successfully wrapped up within a month, and the crew returned to Male' on 26 May 2010.

=== Post-production ===
The editing process for the film was initiated by director Hussain Munawwar, who divided the project into seven components. After completing the first component, Munawwar assigned the editing of the remaining six parts to Ali Musthafa. However, while Musthafa was working on the fifth file, it became corrupted. Munawwar insisted that Musthafa continue working on the next two files and then rework on the first and fifth files afterward. Musthafa successfully completed the editing of the five functional files on 22 August 2010, and they were subsequently handed over to Mohamed Niyaz from Eternal Pictures for color-grading. The entire editing and dubbing process for the film was finalized by 10 September 2010. Sound mixing and recording were managed by Mohamed Ikram.

== Soundtrack ==
The film's soundtrack comprises six original songs, with one of them serving as a promotional track. The music for the promotional song was composed by Hussain Sobah, while Ibrahim Zaid Ali composed the music for the remaining songs. All the lyrics for these songs were written by Mohamed Abdul Ghanee.

Track listing
No.	Title	Lyrics	Music	Singer(s)	Length
1.	"Sazaa"	Mohamed Abdul Ghanee	Ibrahim Zaid Ali	Rafiyath Rameeza	4:11
2.	"Lafzu Thakey"	Mohamed Abdul Ghanee	Ibrahim Zaid Ali	Mumthaz Moosa, Aminath Shaufa Saeed	4:33
3.	"Hindhukolheh"	Mohamed Abdul Ghanee	Ibrahim Zaid Ali	Ibrahim Zaid Ali, Mariyam Ashfa	3:56
4.	"Furathama Nazaru"	Mohamed Abdul Ghanee	Ibrahim Zaid Ali	Ibrahim Zaid Ali	3:51
5.	"Keehvehey"	Mohamed Abdul Ghanee	Ibrahim Zaid Ali	Mohamed Abdul Ghanee	4:36
6.	"Sazaa" (Promotional Song)	Mohamed Abdul Ghanee	Hussain Sobah	Ahmed Yafiu, Rafiyath Rameeza	4:13
Total length:					37:10

== Release and reception ==
The film was theatrically released on 29 March 2011.

According to director Munawwar, the film initially had poor advance booking before its release. However, once it hit theaters and garnered positive word of mouth and favorable reviews, the film's ticket sales steadily increased. By the end of its theatrical run, the film was officially declared a Super-Hit at the box office, ultimately earning the title of the highest-grossing Maldivian film of the year.

The film received positive reviews from critics. Ahmed Nadheem from Haveeru Daily expressed a preference for Sazaa over other recent releases with similar themes. He praised director Hussain Munawwar for his direction and cinematography and commended Mahdi Ahmed for his storytelling style. Ismail Rasheed's villainous performance was highlighted as a standout aspect of the film. Additionally, critics applauded Lufshan Shakeeb for his "memorable appearance" and Niuma Mohamed for her comic timing in the first half of the film.

== Accolades ==
Award	Category	Recipients	Result	Ref.
2nd Maldives Film Awards	Best Original Screenplay	Mahdi Ahmed	Won	
7th Gaumee Film Awards	Best Film	Sazaa	Nominated	
7th Gaumee Film Awards	Best Director	Hussain Munawwar	Nominated	
7th Gaumee Film Awards	Best Actor	Lufshan Shakeeb	Nominated	
7th Gaumee Film Awards	Best Actress	Niuma Mohamed	Nominated	
7th Gaumee Film Awards	Best Supporting Actor	Ismail Rasheed	Nominated	
7th Gaumee Film Awards	Best Editing	Ali Musthafa	Won	
7th Gaumee Film Awards	Best Cinematography	Hussain Munawwar	Won	
7th Gaumee Film Awards	Best Screenplay	Mahdi Ahmed	Nominated	
7th Gaumee Film Awards	Best Background Music	Mohamed Ikram	Won	
7th Gaumee Film Awards	Best Sound Editing	Mohamed Ikram	Nominated	
7th Gaumee Film Awards	Best Sound Mixing	Mohamed Ikram	Nominated	
7th Gaumee Film Awards	Best Art Direction	Hussain Munawwar	Nominated	
7th Gaumee Film Awards	Best Costume Design	Hussain Munawwar	Nominated	
7th Gaumee Film Awards	Best Makeup	Niuma Mohamed, Fathimath Azifa	Nominated	
