= Gaumee Film Award for Best Director =

Gaumee Film Award

- Awarded for: Best Director
- Country: Maldives
- Presented by: National Centre for the Arts

The Gaumee Film Award for Best Director is given as part of the Gaumee Film Awards for Maldivian Films.

The award was first given in 1994. Here is a list of the award winners and the nominees of the respective award ceremonies.

== Winners and nominees ==
Year	Photos of winners	Director	Film	Ref(s)
1st (1995)		Mohamed Niyaz	Dheriyaa	
1st (1995)		No Other Nominee		
2nd (1997)	Not Available			
3rd (2007)		Mahdi Ahmed	Amaanaaiy	
3rd (2007)		No Other Nominee		
4th (2007)		Abdul Faththaah	Vehey Vaarey Therein	
4th (2007)		Fathimath Nahula	Zuleykha	
4th (2007)		Fathimath Nahula	Kalaayaanulaa	
5th (2008)		Ahmed Nimal	Vaaloabi Engeynama	
5th (2008)		No Other Nominee		
6th (2015)		Moomin Fuad	Happy Birthday	
6th (2015)		Niuma Mohamed	Niuma	
6th (2015)		Ahmed Nimal	Zalzalaa En'buri Aun	
6th (2015)		Fathimath Nahula	Yoosuf	
6th (2015)		Aishath Rishmy	Fanaa	
7th (2016)		Moomin Fuad	Loodhifa	
7th (2016)		Ravee Farooq	Ingili	
7th (2016)		Abdul Faththaah	Love Story	
7th (2016)		Hussain Munawwar	Sazaa	
7th (2016)		Ali Shifau	Fathis Handhuvaruge Feshun 3D	
8th (2017)		Ali Shifau	Vaashey Mashaa Ekee	
8th (2017)		Aishath Fuad Thaufeeq	Hulhudhaan	
8th (2017)		Ali Seezan	Ahsham	
8th (2017)		Ali Shifau	Emme Fahu Vindha Jehendhen	
8th (2017)		Ravee Farooq	Mikoe Bappa Baey Baey	
9th (2019)		Yoosuf Shafeeu	Dhevansoora	
9th (2019)		Ismail Nihad	Ill Noise	
9th (2019)		Abdul Faththaah	Hahdhu	
9th (2019)		Ravee Farooq	Vishka	
9th (2019)		Ali Shifau	Vakin Loabin	

== See also ==
- Gaumee Film Awards
