= Ingili =

- Official film poster
- Directed by: Ravee Farooq
- Written by: Mahdi Ahmed
- Screenplay by: Mahdi Ahmed
- Produced by: Ravee Farooq; Hussain Munawwar; Mahdi Ahmed
- Starring: Ismail Rasheed; Abdulla Muaz
- Cinematography: Hussain Munawwar
- Edited by: Ravee Farooq
- Music by: Mohamed Ikram
- Production companies: R2; KID Production; T for 2 Production
- Release date: May 16, 2013
- Running time: 85 minutes
- Country: Maldives
- Language: Dhivehi
- Budget: MVR 100,000

Ingili (Dhivehi: އިނގިލި, translation: Finger) is a 2013 Maldivian experimental suspense thriller film directed by Ravee Farooq. Produced by Ravee Farooq, Hussain Munawwar and Mahdi Ahmed, the film stars Ismail Rasheed and Abdulla Muaz in pivotal roles. The film was released on 16 May 2013.

== Plot ==
MOOSA (Ismail Rasheed) is a fisherman who anchors at an island he is not familiar with when his boat hits a storm at sea. He finds a remote hut on land where he decides to stay there for the rest of the night until the storm passes away.

But soon his inner fears surface when he starts to realize that he is all by himself at an unknown place. As he spends roaming around the hut unable to sleep, he feels relieved when a stranger named AMMADEY (Abdulla Muaz) appears. Surprisingly, they become fast friends but not before they play couple of pranks on each other.

As their friendship develops, MOOSA begins to learn that AMMADEY is the complete opposite of what he is. AMMADEY is both reckless and fears nothing and carries a small knife for fun.

Unbeknownst to MOOSA, AMMADEY starts a psychological game by exploring the very inner fears of MOOSA. He soon lures MOOSA in to what seems an easy bet that raises more fear and tension inside MOOSA with each passing minute.

Will MOOSA win the bet and getaway with the ultimate price or face the consequences if he loses?

== About the story ==
INGILI is based on 2007 national award-winning short story from under 16 category 'HOLHUASHEEGE EKUVERIYAA' written by MOHAMED HASSAAN who was just 14 years then.

== Cast ==
- Ismail Rasheed as Moosa
- Abdulla Muaz as Ammaday

== Accolades ==
Award	Category	Recipients	Result	Ref.
4th SAARC Film Festival	Best Film	Ingili (Bronze Medal)	Won	
4th SAARC Film Festival	Best Actor	Ismail Rasheed	Won	
3rd Maldives Film Awards	Best Film	Ingili	Won	
3rd Maldives Film Awards	Best Director	Ravee Farooq	Won	
3rd Maldives Film Awards	Best Actor	Ismail Rasheed	Won	
3rd Maldives Film Awards	Best Supporting Actor	Abdulla Muaz	Won	
3rd Maldives Film Awards	Best Male Debut	Ali Sofeeh Samir	Won	
3rd Maldives Film Awards	Best Original Screenplay	Mahdi Ahmed	Won	
3rd Maldives Film Awards	Best Cinematography	Hussain Munawwar	Won	
3rd Maldives Film Awards	Best Editing	Ravee Farooq	Nominated	
3rd Maldives Film Awards	Best Original Score	Mohamed Ikram	Won	
3rd Maldives Film Awards	Best Sound Editing	Mohamed Ikram	Won	
3rd Maldives Film Awards	Best Mixing	Mohamed Ikram	Won	
3rd Maldives Film Awards	Best Art Direction	Ravee Farooq, Mahdi Ahmed, Hussain Munawwar	Won	
3rd Maldives Film Awards	Best Costume Design	Ravee Farooq, Mahdi Ahmed	Nominated	
3rd Maldives Film Awards	Best Visual Effects	Ahmed Sinan	Nominated	
7th Gaumee Film Awards	Best Film	Ingili	Nominated	
7th Gaumee Film Awards	Best Director	Ravee Farooq	Nominated	
7th Gaumee Film Awards	Best Actor	Ismail Rasheed	Nominated	
7th Gaumee Film Awards	Best Supporting Actor	Abdulla Muaz	Nominated	
7th Gaumee Film Awards	Best Editing	Ravee Farooq	Nominated	
7th Gaumee Film Awards	Best Cinematography	Hussain Munawwar	Nominated	
7th Gaumee Film Awards	Best Screenplay	Mahdi Ahmed	Nominated	
7th Gaumee Film Awards	Best Sound Editing	Mohamed Ikram	Nominated	
7th Gaumee Film Awards	Best Sound Mixing	Mohamed Ikram	Nominated	
7th Gaumee Film Awards	Best Art Direction	Ravee Farooq, Mahdi Ahmed, Hussain Munawwar	Nominated	
7th Gaumee Film Awards	Best Costume Design	Ravee Farooq, Mahdi Ahmed	Nominated	
7th Gaumee Film Awards	Best Makeup	Ravee Farooq, Hussain Muawwar	Nominated	
