= Gaumee Film Award for Best Screenplay =

- Awarded for: Best Screenplay
- Country: Maldives
- Presented by: National Centre for the Arts

The Gaumee Film Award for Best Screenplay is given as part of the Gaumee Film Awards for Maldivian Films.

The award was first given in 1995. Here is a list of the award winners and the nominees of the respective award ceremonies.

== Winners and nominees ==
| Year | Photos of winners | Screenwriter | Film | Ref(s) |
|---|---|---|---|---|
| 1st (1995) | | Hussain Rasheed, Abdullah Rasheed | Beyvafaa | |
| 1st (1995) | | No Other Nominee | | |
| 2nd (1997) | Not Available | | | |
| 3rd (2007) | | Mohamed Niyaz, Mahdi Ahmed | Amaanaaiy | |
| 3rd (2007) | | No Other Nominee | | |
| 4th (2007) | | Abdul Faththaah | Vehey Vaarey Therein | |
| 4th (2007) | | No Other Nominee | | |
| 5th (2008) | | Mahdi Ahmed | Vaaloabi Engeynama | |
| 5th (2008) | | No Other Nominee | | |
| 6th (2015) | | Moomin Fuad | Happy Birthday | |
| 6th (2015) | | Ibrahim Waheed | Niuma | |
| 6th (2015) | | Ibrahim Waheed | Fanaa | |
| 7th (2016) | | Moomin Fuad | Loodhifa | |
| 7th (2016) | | Mahdi Ahmed | Ingili | |
| 7th (2016) | | Mahdi Ahmed | Sazaa | |
| 7th (2016) | | Ibrahim Waheed | Fathis Handhuvaruge Feshun 3D | |
| 8th (2017) | | Aishath Fuad Thaufeeg | Hulhudhaan | |
| 8th (2017) | | Mahdi Ahmed | Vaashey Mashaa Ekee | |
| 8th (2017) | | Ahmed Nimal | Aniya | |
| 8th (2017) | | Mahdi Ahmed, Ahmed Zareer | Ahsham | |
| 8th (2017) | | Mahdi Ahmed | Mikoe Bappa Baey Baey | |
| 9th (2019) | | Yoosuf Shafeeu | Dhevansoora | |
| 9th (2019) | | Ahmed Mauroof Jameel | Ill Noise | |
| 9th (2019) | | Mahdi Ahmed | Hahdhu | |
| 9th (2019) | | Mahdi Ahmed | Vishka | |
| 9th (2019) | | Aishath Fuad Thaufeeq | Vakin Loabin | |

== See also ==
- Gaumee Film Awards
