= Kamanaa =

2024 Maldivian film

- Official film poster
- Directed by: Hussain Munawwar
- Written by: Rishfa Abdul Samad
- Screenplay by: Mahdi Ahmed
- Produced by: Ali Shaniz Mohamed; Hussain Munawwar
- Starring: Yoosuf Shafeeu; Mariyam Azza; Aminath Rashfa
- Cinematography: Shivaz Abdulla
- Edited by: Abdulla Muaz
- Music by: Ahmed Imthiyaz
- Production companies: Kid Production; Saturn Production
- Release date: 27 August 2024
- Country: Maldives
- Language: Dhivehi

Kamanaa is a 2024 Maldivian film directed by Hussain Munawwar. Co-produced by Ali Shaniz Mohamed and Hussain Munawwar under Kid Production and Saturn Production, the film stars Yoosuf Shafeeu, Mariyam Azza and Aminath Rashfa in pivotal roles. The story follows a happily married couple whose relationship is shattered when the husband undergoes a drastic transformation, while the wife battles to survive and protect her unborn child.

The film was released on 27 August 2024. Upon release, the film received mixed-to-positive reviews from critics and was ultimately declared the highest-grossing film in the history of Maldivian cinema by the end of its theatrical run.

== Premise ==
Haidhar and Rimsha, a newlywed couple deeply in love, live a peaceful and prosperous life on their island. Haidhar’s reputation as a respected figure in the community and Rimsha’s skill as a seamstress make them a well-regarded pair. Their happiness grows when Rimsha becomes pregnant, further cementing their dreams of a perfect family. Meanwhile, Rimsha’s friend Zulfa, married to a wealthy businessman Abbas, insists on bringing a second wife, Nora, into their home. Young and alluring, Nora moves to the island, disrupting the balance of relationships as she begins to secretly desire Haidhar.

Fate intertwines their lives when Haidhar starts tutoring Abbas’s child and meets Nora. Drawn to each other, Haidhar and Nora embark on a clandestine affair, fueled by temptation and Rimsha’s inability to fulfill Haidhar’s needs during her pregnancy. This betrayal marks the beginning of a downward spiral for Haidhar, who becomes irritable and violent, turning their once-idyllic marriage into a nightmare of domestic abuse. Rimsha struggles to endure the emotional and physical toll.

== Cast ==
- Yoosuf Shafeeu as Haidar
- Mariyam Azza as Rimsha
- Aminath Rashfa as Nora
- Mohamed Rasheed as Abbas
- Mohamed Manik as Nabeel
- Nathasha Jaleel as Zulfa
- Aminath Rasheedha (Special appearance)

== Development ==
The crew departed from Male' for filming on 19 January 2024. Filming took place in Ha. Mulhadhoo. The project was officially announced on 28 May 2024. The lead cast of the film was announced to include Mariyam Azza and Yoosuf Shafeeu, marking their first collaboration as an onscreen married couple. Azza initially rejected the film, as she was on a career break following Loabi Vevijje (2023). However, after reading the script and considering Munawwar’s insistence, she accepted the role, finding the character different from her previous portrayals. To prepare for her role, Azza gained weight up to 70 kilograms, and as the script demanded, lost over 20 kilograms for a specific scene.

Based on a true incident that occurred in Maldives, the story was written by Rishfa Abdul Samad with Mahdi Ahmed adapting it into a screenplay. The film narrates the story of a domestic violence survivor, marking Ahmed’s third collaboration with Munawwar. Filming was wrapped in June 2024. Post production of the film, including dubbing was completed in mid-August 2024.

== Soundtrack ==
Track listing
No.	Title	Lyrics	Music	Singer(s)	Length
1.	"Mi Hayaathah"	Adam Haleem Adhnan		Rafiyath Rameeza	7:50
2.	"Kathi Kathi Chaalu"	Mohamed Abdul Ghanee		Mohamed Abdul Ghanee, Rafiyath Rameeza, Mariyam Ashfa	5:11
3.	"Saafu Loabi"	Easa Shareef	Mohamed Abdul Ghanee	Mohamed Abdul Ghanee, Mariyam Ashfa	5:19

== Release and reception ==
Kamanaa was released on 27 August 2024 to mainly positive response from critics and audience. Aminath Lubaa from The Press praised the performances of the lead cast, particularly Mariyam Azza, Yoosuf Shafeeu and Aminath Rashfa. Lubaa also commending the screenplay by Mahdi Ahmed, as well as the film's cinematography and musical score.

Due to high demand following its release, the distributor added additional late-evening weekend shows. The film had a remarkable run, screening thirty-seven houseful shows at Olympus Cinema and several packed screenings on other islands. It was declared one of the most commercially successful films in Maldivian cinema history. Additional shows were also screened in limited theatres in Bangkok.

== Accolades ==
Year	Award	Category	Recipients	Result	Ref.
2025	5th Karnataka International Film Festival	Best Director	Hussain Munawwar	Won	
2025	5th Karnataka International Film Festival	Best Lead Actor	Yoosuf Shafeeu	Won	
2025	5th Karnataka International Film Festival	Best Lead Actress	Mariyam Azza	Won	
