= Maalhos (Baa Atoll) =

Maalhos މާޅޮސް
- Inhabited island
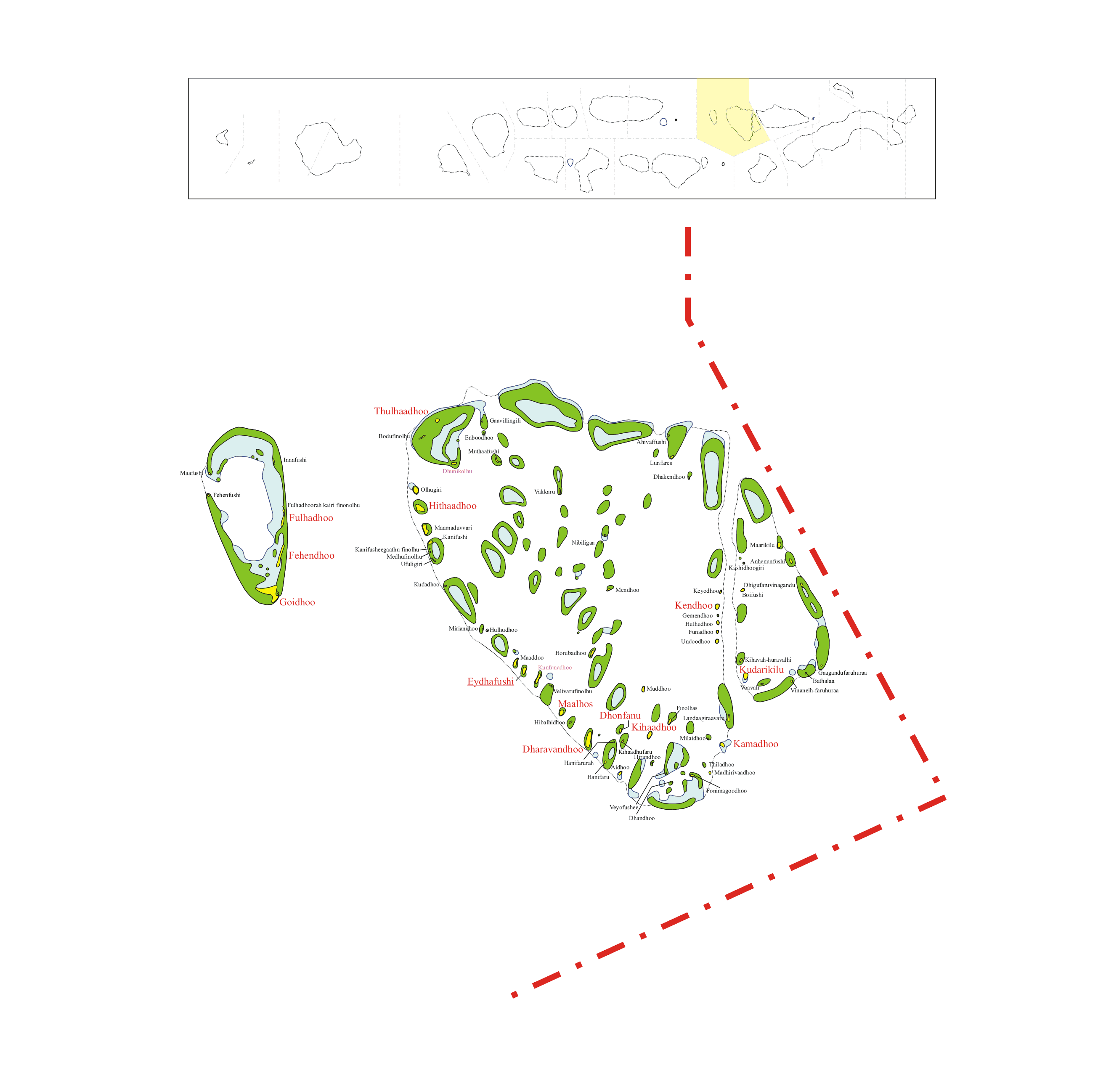
- Map of w:Baa_Atoll

- Location in Maldives
- Coordinates: 05°08′06″N 73°06′30″E
- Country: Maldives
- Administrative atoll: Baa Atoll
- Distance to Malé: 115.06 km (71.49 mi)

Dimensions
  - Length: 7.650 km (4.753 mi)
  - Width: 0.500 km (0.311 mi)

Population (2022)
  - Total: 572
- Time zone: UTC+05:00 (MST)

Maalhos (Dhivehi: މާޅޮސް), known as one of the inhabited islands of Southern Maalhosmadulhu Atoll, code letter Baa Atoll.

== History ==
By historical researches the researchers have found that Buddhism was the main religion of Maalhos. Hassan Ibrahim (Aveli) found a damaged part of a budda head from the old grave yard.

== Geography ==
The island is 115.06 km (71 mi; 62 nmi) northwest of the country's capital, Malé.

== Demography ==
Historical population
Year	Pop.	±%
2006	392	—
2014	460	+17.3%
2022	572	+24.3%
2006-2022: Census populations Source:

== Economy ==
=== Tourism ===
The island is open for day trips by tourists that would like to get to know the local culture and way of life. The island has a small port, small shops and cafes. Here is a 360° panorama of The island white sand beach with fallen coconuts. Maalhos is just a couple of minutes away from the nearby resort islands.

== Culture ==
In this island there is the custom once every year to take a bath in seven different wells (haiy valhuń feń veruń). This is probably an ancestral Dravidian custom. The Pulaya or Cheruman, an agricultural caste of Kerala, used to take a bath in seven different tanks when they were considering themselves polluted. During the eid festival, men cook 'firihenun kekkun' and serve dinner to the women of the island and vice versa. a Jungle Parade by the people of Maalhos is a modified edition of the parade by the Army.
