= Ismail Rasheed =

Maldivian film actor and director (born 1976)

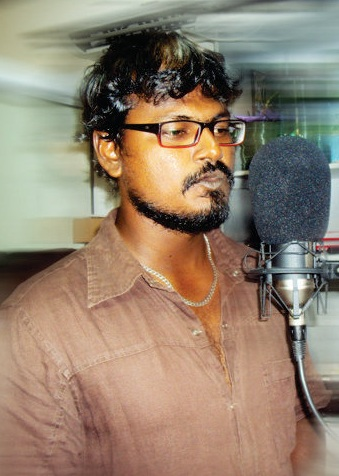
- Rasheed at a dubbing session of Sazaa
- Born: Ismail Rasheed; 20 April 1976 (age 50); Male', Maldives
- Occupations: Actor, Producer, Director and TV presenter
- Years active: 1996–present
- Spouse(s): Mariya Ibrahim | Rahuma Hassan (-present)
- Children: Ali Iufaaf Ismail; Adam Ijlaal Ismail; Isra

Ismail Rasheed (born 20 April 1976) is a Maldivian film actor and director. He has established a career in Maldivian films and is the recipient of several awards, including a Gaumee Film Award.

== Biography ==
Ismail Rasheed is a son of Maldivian poet, writer and the founder of the K.M.R. Production, Mohamed Rasheed. Ismail Rasheed worked at the Maldives Airports Company Ltd, but he left his job to give more time for his Acting career.

He began his career in 1996 with a comedic role from Maldives Airport Authority's Tele Drama Zimmaa. He received the Best Comedian Award form the Tele Drama Awards for his role in Zimmaa. In the following year, he received the Best Comedian Award and the Best Actor Award for his role in Tele Drama Thafaathu, in which he played double role. He also received the Best Actor Award for the Tele Drama Leyattakai.

His first Feature Film was Edhi Edhi Hoadheemey of K.M.R. Production. He played a funny yet heartfelt role in the film. His second Feature Film was Heylaa, from which he won the Best Supporting Actor Award. His rich nature of acting was also seen from the films like, Moomin Fuad's Loodhifa and Hussain Munavvar's Sazaa.

== Media image ==
In 2018, he was ranked in the first position from Dho?'s list of Top Ten Actor of Maldives.

== Filmography ==
=== Feature Film ===
Year	Title	Role	Notes	Ref(s)
2003	Edhi Edhi Hoadheemey	Thoyyib		
2006	Heylaa	Ahammaa	Gaumee Film Award for Best Supporting Actor	
2011	Loodhifa	Nashid	Gaumee Film Award for Best Actor; Maldives Film Awards for Best Actor	
2011	Sazaa	Ahmed	Nominated — Gaumee Film Award for Best Supporting Actor	
2013	Ingili	Moosa	SAARC Film Festival 2014 Best Actor; Nominated — Gaumee Film Award for Best Actor; Maldives Film Award for Best Actor	
2013	Dhilakani	Shamin	Nominated — Maldives Film Awards for Best Actor	
2014	Aniyaa	Latheef	Nominated — Gaumee Film Award for Best Supporting Actor	
2019	Goh Raalhu	Naeem		
2023	Beeveema	Ayaz		
2025	Abadhah	Jamaal		
2025	Kan'bulo	Umar		
2026	Jannath			
2026	Dhevi			

=== Television ===
Year	Title	Role	Notes	Ref(s)
1996	Zimmaa		Tele Drama; Tele Drama Award for Best Comedian	
1997	Thafaathu		Tele Drama; Tele Drama Award for Best Comedian; Tele Drama Award for Best Actor	
1998	Leyattakai		Tele Drama; Tele Drama Award for Best Actor	
1999	Thadhu Thedhu Huvafen		Tele Drama	
2000	Dharifulhu	Nihan	Main role	
2005	Fukkashi		Main role; 24 episodes	
2006	Dhafaraa		Main role; 13 episodes	
2006	Nethi Dhiyayas	Nasir	Main role; 5 episodes	
2007	Reyfanaa		Recurring role	
2009	Mohamma Gaadiyaa	Buruhan	Main role; 5 episodes	
2010	Mohamma Gaadiyaa 2	Membaru Abdul Hakeem	Main role; 4 episodes	
2012	Case 34	Suhail	Tele Drama	
2016	Tales of Akhbar & Birbal	Birbal	Main role; 12 episodes	
2020	Gamini	MP Ali Thoha	Main Role	
2022	Netheemey	Adheel	Main role; 5 episodes	
2022	Dark Rain Chronicles	Shareef	Main role in the segment "Rankolhaa"	
2025	Chaalaakee			

=== Short film ===
Year	Title	Role	Notes
2006	Haa Shaviyani Rasgefaanu		
2006	Haa Shaviyani Rasgefaanu 2		
2007	Bunyey Bunyey	Alifulhu	
2007	Farihibe 1	Moosafulhu	
2007	Loabeegaa Dhon U		
2007	E Soru	Dhonmaniku	
2007	Haa Shaviyani Rasgefaanu 3		
2007	Haa Shaviyani Rasgefaanu 4		
2007	E Soru 2	Dhonmaniku	
2007	Nama Nama Usmaanu	Bond	
2007	Badi Edhuru	Nasih	
2008	Farihibe 2	Mafuthu Ali	
2008	Umurah Salaam	Faheem	
2008	Dhanthura		
2008	Paruvaanaa		Also the director
2009	Fahun Rangalhuvaane		Also the director
2009	Dhanna Nudhanna		
2009	Dheulhi Ehnuvi Dhiulhi	Nashid	
2009	Beyinsaafu	Tholal	Also the director
2009	Fahun Rangalhuvaane 2		Also the director
2010	Dhanna Nudhanna 2		
2010	Magey Yaagoothu	Bakurube	Also the director
2010	Kudafoolhu		
2011	Farihibe 3	Moosafulhu	
2011	Siyaasee Vaccine	Ali Mohamed	Nominated — Maldives Film Awards for Best Actor in Short Film
2012	13 Ah Visnaa 2000	Fainagaa Ismailfulhu	Nominated — Maldives Film Awards for Best Supporting Actor in Short Film
2013	Siyaasee Koalhun	Jaabiru	Nominated — Maldives Film Awards for Best Supporting Actor in Short Film
2013	Farihibe 4	Ajumal	Maldives Film Awards for Best Supporting Actor in Short Film
2019	Kan'du Ibilees		Also the director
2021	Feehaali	Masoodh	
2021	O' Wazan		

=== Other work ===
Year	Title	Director	Writer	Notes	Ref(s)
2017	Thaubaavey	Yes		Office drama	
2018	Ihaanaiy	Yes	Yes	Office drama	
2019	Nakalu	Yes		Office drama	

== Television presenter ==
- Call Isse Live (2011)
- Hungaanu (2012)

== Accolades ==
Year	Award	Category	Nominated work	Result	Ref(s)
1997	Tele Drama Awards - 1997	Best Comedian	Zimmaa	Won	
1998	Tele Drama Awards - 1998	Best Actor	Thafaathu	Won	
1998	Tele Drama Awards - 1998	Best Comedian	Thafaathu	Won	
1999	Tele Drama Awards - 1999	Best Actor	Leyattakai	Won	
2008	2nd Miadhu Crystal Awards	Best Villain	Heylaa	Won	
2008	2nd Miadhu Crystal Awards	Best Actor in Drama Category	Nethi Dhiyayas	Won	
2008	5th Gaumee Film Awards	Best Supporting Actor	Heylaa	Won	
2012	2nd Maldives Film Awards	Best Actor	Loodhifa	Won	
2012	2nd Maldives Film Awards	Best Art Direction	Loodhifa	Won	
2012	2nd Maldives Film Awards	Best Actor in Short Film	Siyaasee Vaccine	Nominated	
2014	3rd Maldives Film Awards	Best Actor	Ingili	Won	
2014	3rd Maldives Film Awards	Best Actor	Dhilakani	Nominated	
2014	3rd Maldives Film Awards	Best Supporting Actor in Short Film	Farihibe 4	Won	
2014	3rd Maldives Film Awards	Best Supporting Actor in Short Film	Siyaasee Koalhun	Nominated	
2014	3rd Maldives Film Awards	Best Supporting Actor in Short Film	13 Ah Visnaa 2000	Nominated	
2014	4th SAARC Film Festival	Best Actor	Ingili	Won	
2016	7th Gaumee Film Awards	Best Actor	Loodhifa	Won	
2016	7th Gaumee Film Awards	Best Art Direction	Loodhifa (shared with Hussain Munawwar and Moomin Fuad)	Won	
2016	7th Gaumee Film Awards	Best Actor	Ingili	Nominated	
2016	7th Gaumee Film Awards	Best Supporting Actor	Sazaa	Nominated	
2017	8th Gaumee Film Awards	Best Supporting Actor	Aniyaa	Nominated	
2017	8th Gaumee Film Awards	Best Supporting Actor	Farihibe 4	Nominated	
2017	8th Gaumee Film Awards	Best Supporting Actor	Farihibe 3	Nominated	
2017	8th Gaumee Film Awards	Best Supporting Actor	Siyaasee Vaccine	Nominated	
2019	PSM Office Drama Competition	Best Director	Nakalu	Won	
2025	1st MSPA Film Awards	Best Lead Actor – Male	Beeveema	Nominated	
