= Balhindhu =

2021 Maldivian film

- Official film poster
- Directed by: Ahmed Sinan
- Written by: Hood Ibrahim
- Screenplay by: Hood Ibrahim
- Produced by: Mohamed Ali; Aishath Fuad Thaufeeq
- Starring: Ali Azim; Aminath Rashfa; Mariyam Majudha; Nuzuhath Shuaib
- Cinematography: Ali Shifau; Adam Waseem
- Edited by: Ahmed Sinan
- Music by: Fathuhullah Shakeel Hussain
- Production company: Dark Rain Entertainment
- Country: Maldives
- Language: Dhivehi

Balhindhu is an upcoming Maldivian horror film directed by Ahmed Sinan. Produced by Mohamed Ali and Aishath Fuad Thaufeeq under Dark Rain Entertainment, the film stars Ali Azim, Aminath Rashfa, Mariyam Majudha, Nuzuhath Shuaib, Sharaf Abdulla and Ismail Jumaih.

== Cast ==
- Ali Azim
- Aminath Rashfa
- Mariyam Majudha
- Nuzuhath Shuaib
- Sharaf Abdulla
- Ismail Jumaih
- Hunaisha Adam Naseer
- Aisha Ali
- Fathimath Latheefa
- Mariyam Shakeela
- Mohamed Mazin

== Production ==
=== Development ===
In September 2019, as Dark Rain Entertainment celebrated its thirteenth anniversary, the studio unveiled the project Balhindhu, marking the third directorial venture of Ahmed Sinan. The film faced several challenges during its pre-production stage. A year after the project's announcement, the crew disclosed that only fifteen percent of the project had been completed. On 9 October 2020, the first look of the character played by Mariyam Shakeela was revealed, drawing media attention and garnering acclaim for the prosthetic makeup and cinematography.

=== Casting ===
The cast of the film were initially finalized to be Aminath Rashfa, Mohamed Jumayyil, Fathimath Sara Adam, Mohamed Yunaan, Ismail Jumaih and Hunaisha Adam Naseer. However, following the child abuse allegation over Jumayyil, Dark Rain Entertainment severed ties with him and opted for re-shooting the majority of the scenes with some changes in the cast. In September 2020, it was reported that Ali Azim will replace Jumayyil in the film and announced that Mariyam Majudha, Nuzuhath Shuaib and Sharaf Abdulla will join the cast while Fathimath Sara Adam and Mohamed Yunaan will no longer be part of the project.

=== Filming ===
Filming for Balhindhu commenced on 15 January 2020, with the initial cast, initiating the first schedule in Male' and Hulhumale'. However, due to the COVID-19 pandemic filming was abruptly halted when forty-five percent of the production had been completed. Subsequently, following the controversy surrounding the lead actor of the film, filming was postponed. After undergoing a significant re-casting process, filming for Balhindhu resumed in September 2020. Filming was completed in October 2023.
