= Dark Rain Entertainment =

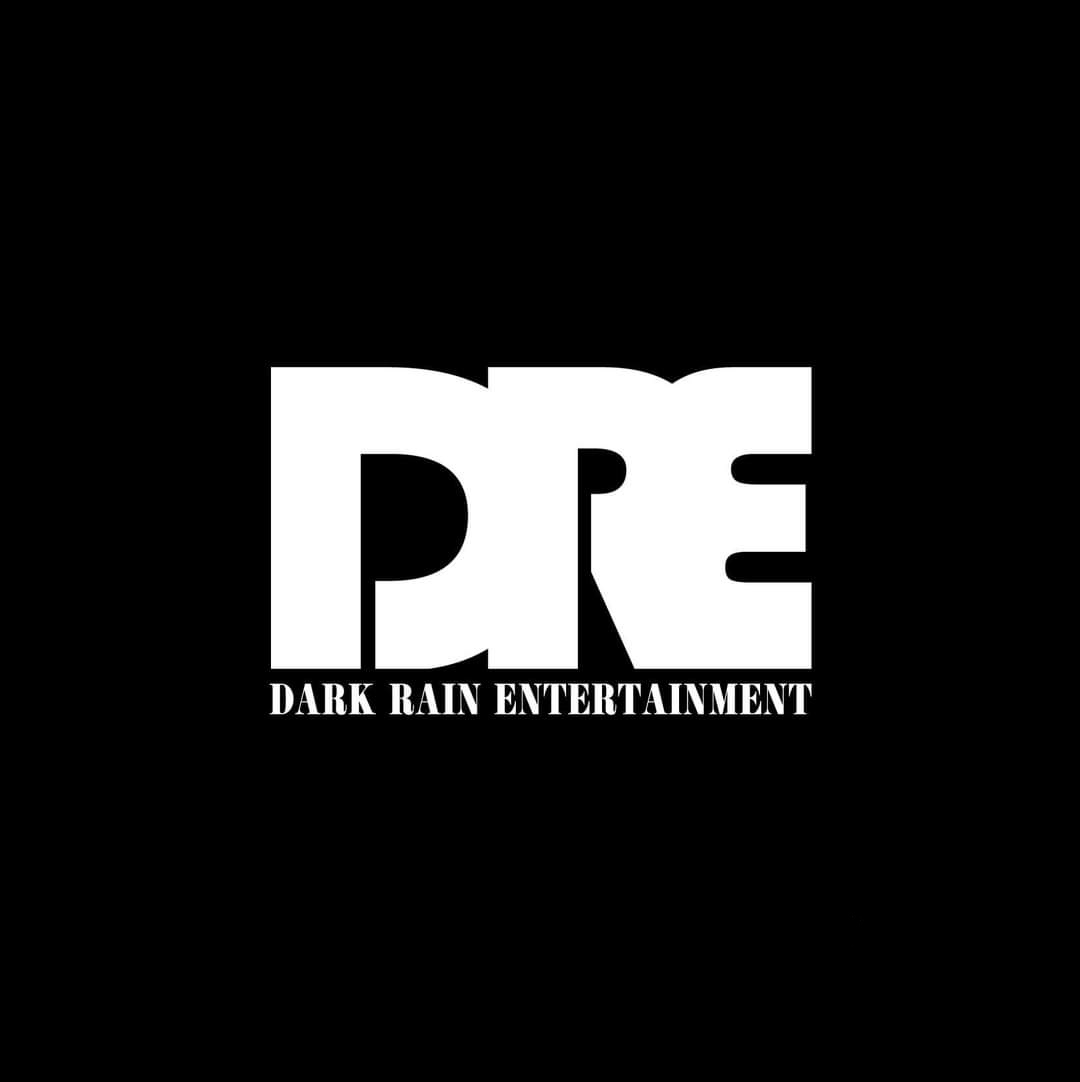
- Company type: Private
- Industry: Entertainment
- Founded: Dark Rain Entertainment
- Headquarters: Male', Maldives
- Key people: Ali Shifau; Mohamed Ali
- Products: Film production
- Website: Dark Rain Entertainment

Dark Rain Entertainment is a Maldivian production company based in Male' producing Maldivian films. Established in 2006, the studio has produced the first Maldivian films shot entirely in HD, 3D and on DSLR.

== History ==
The studio's first feature film production was Moomin Fuad's suspense thriller film Happy Birthday (2009) which narrates the story of a simple man who receives a call on his birthday informing him that his wife and son have been kidnapped, only to be returned for a ransom. The film was a commercial failure, despite the positive response from the critics. Winning five Gaumee Film Awards and twelve Maldives Film Awards, the film was also screened at the Venice Film Festival.

The company then paced their production more into a commercial phase with the family drama Dhin Veynuge Hithaamaigaa (2010) starring an ensemble cast including Yoosuf Shafeeu, Niuma Mohamed, Ali Seezan, Mohamed Manik and Ravee Farooq. The film showcases discrimination against the islanders, family revenge and fatherhood responsibilities. It received a positive response from critics for adopting a "unique approach in presenting the concept to the romance-starved Maldivian audience" was particularly noted and was believed to be a "huge improvement" compared to the recent Maldivian films. Their next production venture was the psychological romantic thriller Zaharu (2011) starring Ali Seezan, Niuma Mohamed and Sheela Najeeb. The film centers on a married man who has a weekend affair with a woman who refuses to allow it to end and becomes obsessed with him. The film was inspired from Adrian Lyne-directed American psychological erotic thriller film Fatal Attraction (1987). Upon release it received a mixed response from critics and was declared a "flop" at the box office.

In 2013, they released the horror film Fathis Handhuvaruge Feshun 3D which serves as a prequel to Fathis Handhuvaru (1997) starring Reeko Moosa Manik and Niuma Mohamed in lead roles. It was based on a story by Ibrahim Waheed, Jinaa: Fathis Handhuvaruge Feshun (2009), which itself is a prequel to the story Fathishandhuvaru (1996) written by himself which was later adapted to a film by the same name in 1997. The film was marketed as being the first 3D release for a Maldivian film and the first release derived from a spin-off. Upon release the film received generally negative reviews from critics. The following year, Aishath Fuad Thaufeeq wrote and directed Hulhudhaan featuring Mariyam Majudha and Roanu Hassan Manik which garnered critical success and was later screened at the Venice Film Festival.

In 2015, the studio produced two films. Their first release was the Ali Shifau-directed romantic film Emme Fahu Vindha Jehendhen (2015) starring Mohamed Jumayyil and Mariyam Majudha. The film was declared as the highest grossing Maldivian film of the year, and was also a critical success. Ravee Farooq was roped in to direct the suspense thriller film Mikoe Bappa Baey Baey which stars Mohamed Manik and Aishath Rishmy in pivotal roles. The film along with his direction and performances were critically acclaimed. It was one of the three entries from the Maldives at the 2016 SAARC Film Festival.

The company collaborated with Ali Shifau, Mohamed Jumayyil and Mariyam Majudha for a romantic comedy film, Vaashey Mashaa Ekee (2016) which emerged as one of the highest grossing Maldivian film of the year. The following year, the studio assigned Ali Shifau to release the romantic comedy film Mee Loaybakee (2017) starring Mohamed Jumayyil alongside Mariyam Azza. The film emerged as one of the highest grossing Maldivian films of 2017. This was followed by a family drama Vakin Loabin (2018), marking Shifau's fourth collaboration with Mohamed Jumayyil and his third collaboration with Mariyam Majudha. The film tells a story of a young couple's divorce and its impact on everyone involved. Upon release, the film met with a positive response from critics, specifically praising the screenplay for toning down its melodrama and breaking from the stereotypes of its genre, and it was a commercial success.

== Films produced ==
=== Feature film ===
Year	Title	Director(s)	Producer(s)	Cast	Ref(s)
2009	Happy Birthday	Moomin Fuad	Mohamed Ali	Yoosuf Shafeeu; Niuma Mohamed	
2010	Dhin Veynuge Hithaamaigaa	Ali Shifau	Mohamed Ali	Yoosuf Shafeeu; Niuma Mohamed; Ali Seezan; Mohamed Manik; Ravee Farooq	
2011	Zaharu	Ali Shifau	Mohamed Ali	Ali Seezan; Niuma Mohamed; Sheela Najeeb	
2013	Fathis Handhuvaruge Feshun 3D	Ali Shifau	Mohamed Ali	Yoosuf Shafeeu; Fathimath Fareela; Ahmed Nimal; Ahmed Saeed	
2014	Hulhudhaan	Aishath Fuad Thaufeeq	Mohamed Ali	Mariyam Majudha; Roanu Hassan Manik; Ravee Farooq; Ahmed Saeed	
2015	Emme Fahu Vindha Jehendhen	Ali Shifau	Mohamed Ali; Aishath Fuad Thaufeeq	Mohamed Jumayyil; Mariyam Majudha; Mohamed Manik; Sheela Najeeb	
2015	Mikoe Bappa Baey Baey	Ravee Farooq	Mohamed Ali	Mohamed Manik; Aishath Rishmy	
2016	Vaashey Mashaa Ekee	Ali Shifau	Mohamed Ali; Aishath Fuad Thaufeeq	Mohamed Jumayyil; Mariyam Majudha; Mohamed Faisal; Ali Shazleem; Aminath Noora	
2017	Mee Loaybakee	Ali Shifau	Mohamed Ali; Aishath Fuad Thaufeeq	Mohamed Jumayyil; Mariyam Azza; Samahath Razi	
2018	Vakin Loabin	Ali Shifau	Mohamed Ali; Aishath Fuad Thaufeeq	Mohamed Jumayyil; Mariyam Majudha; Nuzuhath Shuaib	
2019	Goh Raalhu	Ahmed Sinan	Mohamed Ali; Aishath Fuad Thaufeeq	Mohamed Jumayyil; Nuzuhath Shuaib; Hassan Irfan; Aishath Thasneema; Aminath Rashfa	
2019	Maamui	Ali Shifau	Mohamed Ali; Aishath Fuad Thaufeeq	Sheela Najeeb; Mohamed Jumayyil; Mariyam Azza; Mariyam Majudha; Nuzuhath Shuaib	
2023	Beeveema	Ahmed Zareer	Mohamed Ali; Aishath Fuad Thaufeeq	Mariyam Ashfa, Ismail Rasheed, Aminath Rashfa, Adam Zidhan	
2023	Hindhukolheh	Ali Shifau	Mohamed Ali; Aishath Fuad Thaufeeq	Sharaf Abdulla, Aminath Rashfa, Ravee Farooq, Mariyam Majudha	
2023	November	Ali Shifau; Aishath Fuad Thaufeeq	Mohamed Ali; Aishath Fuad Thaufeeq	Mohamed Jumayyil, Mariyam Majudha	
2024	Fureytha	Ali Shifau	Mohamed Ali; Aishath Fuad Thaufeeq	Sharaf Abdulla, Ravee Farooq, Mohamed Manik, Ahmed Saeed	
2024	Bibii	Shahudha Mahmoodh	Mohamed Ali; Aishath Fuad Thaufeeq	Sharaf Abdulla, Mariyam Majudha, Sheela Najeeb, Ahmed Saeed, Aman Ali, Abdullah Shafiu Ibrahim	

=== Short film ===
Year	Title	Director(s)	Producer(s)	Cast	Ref(s)
2007	Badi Edhuru	Ali Shifau	Mohamed Ali	Ismail Rasheed, Abdulla Muaz, Ibrahim Jihad, Ravee Farooq, Aishath Siyadha, Nadhiya Hassan	
2008	Ummeedh	Ali Shifau	Mohamed Ali	Mohamed Manik, Ahmed Asim, Ibrahim Jihad, Hamdhoon Farooq, Sheela Najeeb	
2012	Voodoo	Ali Shifau	Mohamed Ali	Ahmed Nashith, Ahmed Rifau, Umar Ashfaq, Ahmed Hafiz, Shifra Ilham, Abdulla Naseer	
2014	Kashfu	Ali Shifau	Mohamed Ali	Ibrahim Jihad, Fathimath Fareela, Ahmed Saeed	
2020	Dhauvathu	Ali Shifau	Mohamed Ali; Aishath Fuad Thaufeeq	Hoodh Ibrahim, Mariyam Shifa, Ahmed Sunie	
2020	Anguru	Ali Shifau	Mohamed Ali; Aishath Fuad Thaufeeq	Aminath Silna, Roanu Hassan Manik	
2021	Gulhun	Aishath Fuad Thaufeeq	Mohamed Ali	Aminath Shamana, Abdullah Shafiu Ibrahim, Aishath Rishmy, Ravee Farooq, Aminath Rashfa	

=== Television ===
Year	Title	Director(s)	Cast	Notes	Ref(s)
2006	Dhafaraa	Moomin Fuad	Ismail Rasheed, Liraru, Azwaru, Mariyam Rasheedha	13 episodes	
2007	Reyfanaa	Ali Shifau	Mohamed Manik, Niuma Mohamed, Ismail Rasheed, Roanu Hassan Manik, Fauziyya Hassan	14 episodes	
2008	Inthihaa	Moomin Fuad	Niuma Mohamed, Mohamed Manik, Sheela Najeeb	13 episodes	
2008	Yaasmeen	Moomin Fuad	Mohamed Manik, Sheela Najeeb, Ahmed Saeed, Ahmed Nimal	5 episodes	
2008	FB!	Ahmed Saeed	Ahmed Saeed, Ahmed Nimal, Fathimath Azifa, Ibrahim Jihad, Ahmed Asim, Ahmed Ziya	5 episodes	
2008	Asarugaa	Ali Shifau	Hamdhoon Farooq, Aminath Ameela, Roanu Hassan Manik, Aminath Shareef	5 episodes	
2009	Silsilaa	Ali Shifau	Ahmed Asim, Fathimath Azifa, Khadheeja Ibrahim Didi, Nashmee, Hamdhoon Farooq	5 episodes	
2011	Naamaan	Ali Shifau	Mohamed Manik, Niuma Mohamed, Ahmed Saeed, Mohamed Faisal	4 episodes	
2021	Rumi á Jannat	Ali Shifau; Mohamed Faisal	Abdullah Shafiu Ibrahim, Nuzuhath Shuaib, Mohamed Faisal, Adam Rizwee, Roanu Hassan Manik, Maria Teresa Pagano, Sheela Najeeb, Ahmed Saeed	Web series; 15 episodes	
2021	Giritee Loabi	Ali Shifau	Mohamed Vishal, Aminath Rashfa, Mohamed Manik, Mohamed Faisal, Adam Rizwee	Web series; 20 episodes	
2022	Dark Rain Chronicles	Ali Shifau	Adam Rizwee, Sharaf Abdulla, Ahmed Sunie, Aishath Yaadha, Ismail Rasheed, Fathimath Sara Adam, Mohamed Vishal, Ahmed Saeed, Aminath Aseela, Ali Shameel, Ahmed Shakir, Ahmed Sharif	Web series; 6 episodes	
