= Goh Raalhu =

- Official film poster
- Directed by: Ahmed Sinan
- Written by: Moomin Fuad
- Screenplay by: Moomin Fuad
- Produced by: Mohamed Ali; Aishath Fuad Thaufeeq
- Starring: Mohamed Jumayyil; Hassan Irufan; Aishath Thasneema; Aminath Rashfa
- Cinematography: Adam Waseem; Ahmed Sinan
- Edited by: Ahmed Sinan
- Music by: Ismail Adheel
- Production company: Dark Rain Entertainment
- Release date: February 4, 2019
- Running time: 90 minutes
- Country: Maldives
- Language: Dhivehi

Goh Raalhu is a 2019 Maldivian crime thriller film directed by Ahmed Sinan. Produced by Mohamed Ali and Aishath Fuad Thaufeeq under Dark Rain Entertainment, the film stars Mohamed Jumayyil, Hassan Irufan, Aishath Thasneema and Aminath Rashfa in pivotal roles. The film was released on 4 February 2019.

== Premise ==
Aiman (Mohamed Jumayyil) develops inexplicable feelings for Zaina (Aishath Thasneema) who was dating notorious gangster, Husham (Hassan Irfan). Aiman tries to warn Zaina about the shady affairs of Husham who flaunts his devious deed whenever he gets the chance. Being helplessly in love, Zaina refuses to believe Aiman. Feeling threatened, Husham decides to teach Aiman a lesson, that pulls him into the dark, murky life of the city's most ruthless, ill-reputed hoodlum.

== Cast ==
- Mohamed Jumayyil as Aiman
- Hassan Irufan as Husham
- Aishath Thasneema as Zaina
- Aminath Rashfa as Niusha
- Abdullah Azaan as Sofwan
- Nuzuhath Shuaib as Husham's girlfriend
- Ahmed Nashith as Sikey
- Misbah Hameed as Kaatey
- Ali Shunan as Shuntee
- Rizwee as Bond
- Ismail Rasheed as Naeem; Husham's father
- Ahmed Saeed as Husham's uncle
- Mariyam Shakeela as Aiman's aunt
- Mohamed Waheed as Wahid; Niusha's father
- Ahmed Sunee as Zaina's brother
- Ali Shazleem as Ahmed Qalib; station inspector
- Ismail Jumaih as Hambe
- Ahmed Easa aa Husham's friend (special appearance)
- Mohamed Rifshan as Husham's friend (special appearance)
- Huneysa Adam Naseer as Sofwan's sister (special appearance)

== Development ==
The film was announced on 13 March 2017 as Shinan's second direction after his first successful directorial venture 4426 (2016) alongside Fathimath Nahula. On 29 July 2017, it was reported that Mohamed Jumayyil was cast in the lead role of the crime thriller to be featuring in a role he has never portrayed before alongside Hassan Irfan, a vocalist who has performed in the second season of Maldivian Idol. Filming was commenced on 22 November 2017 alongside a big cast including several new faces.

== Soundtrack ==
Track listing
No.	Title	Lyrics	Music	Singer(s)	Length
1.	"Raalheh Hen"	Dinba Music, Affan	Affan	Affan
2.	"Gaathil"	Soppe	Soppe	Soppe, Mira Mohamed Majid

== Release and response ==
The film was initially planned to release the film on 5 April 2018 though they pushed the release date to year's end since their prime focus during the time was aligned to marketing of Vakin Loabin (2018). However, the release date was later confirmed to be 4 February 2019 citing "political instability" during late 2018.

Goh Raalhu received mixed reviews from critics. Aminath Luba of Sun called the film a "five-star worthy blockbuster" and praised every department of it including the cinematography, visual effects, and the plot twist at the end. Terming the crime thriller a "revelation", Luba noted the performances of the actors to be "praise worthy" considering most of the performers are "fresh on-screen".

Ifraz Ali from Dho?! criticized that the movie could not keep up to the hype and it was a mere disappointment. Weak storytelling, issues with character development and "cringe" dialogues was his main concerns. However, he praised Dark Rain for casting a full fresh-face cast and trying out a risky genre like Thriller in Dhivehi Cinema.

== Accolades ==
Award	Category	Recipients	Result	Ref.
3rd Karnataka International Film Festival – 2023	Best Actor – Feature Films	Mohamed Jumayyil	Won	
1st MSPA Film Awards	Best Film	Goh Raalhu	Won	
1st MSPA Film Awards	Best Director	Ahmed Sinan	Won	
1st MSPA Film Awards	Best Lead Actor – Male	Mohamed Jumayyil	Won	
1st MSPA Film Awards	Best Lead Actor – Female	Aminath Thasneema	Nominated	
1st MSPA Film Awards	Best Debut – Male	Hassan Irufan	Won	
1st MSPA Film Awards	Best Debut – Female	Aishath Thasneema	Won	
1st MSPA Film Awards	Best Debut – Female	Aminath Rashfa	Nominated	
1st MSPA Film Awards	Best Negative Role	Hassan Irufaan	Won	
1st MSPA Film Awards	Best Playback Singer – Male	Sofwan Ali – "Qaathil"	Nominated	
1st MSPA Film Awards	Best Playback Singer – Female	Mira Mohamed Majid – "Qaathil"	Nominated	
1st MSPA Film Awards	Best Lyrics	Mohamed Abdul Ghanee – "Raalheh Hen"	Nominated	
1st MSPA Film Awards	Best Story	Moomin Fuad	Nominated	
1st MSPA Film Awards	Best Original Screenplay	Moomin Fuad	Nominated	
1st MSPA Film Awards	Best Editor	Ahmed Sinan	Nominated	
1st MSPA Film Awards	Best Cinematographer	Ahmed Sinan, Adam Waseem	Nominated	
1st MSPA Film Awards	Best Makeup – Special Effects	Ismail Jumaih	Won	
1st MSPA Film Awards	Best Visual Effects	Ahmed Sinan	Nominated	
1st MSPA Film Awards	Best Sound Engineer	Ali Shifau, Ahmed Sinan	Nominated	
1st MSPA Film Awards	Background Score	Ismail Adheel	Nominated	
