= 1st MSPA Film Awards =

Maldivian film awards

- Presented on: 22 August 2025
- Site: Malé
- Hosted by: Ali Waheed; Mohamed Faisal
- Organized by: Maldives Society for Performing Arts

Highlights
- Best Film: Goh Raalhu
- Best Director: Ahmed Sinan for Goh Raalhu
- Best Actor: Mohamed Jumayyil for Goh Raalhu
- Best Actress: Niuma Mohamed for Nivairoalhi
- Most awards: Goh Raalhu (7)
- Most nominations: Goh Raalhu (19)

Television coverage
- Network: SSTV

The 1st MSPA Film Awards, also referred as MSPA Film Awards 2024 is a ceremony, presented by Maldives Society for Performing Arts, which honors the best Maldivian films released between 2018 to 2023. The ceremony was initially scheduled to be held on 30 December 2024; however, it was delayed due to certain internal issues. The ceremony was held on 22 August 2025. The Lifetime Achievement Award was named after the legendary actor Chilhiya Moosa Manik in honor of his contribution to the industry.

Goh Raalhu led the ceremony with 19 nominations, followed by Maamui with 15 nominations and Vakin Loabin with 14 nominations, all of which are produced by Dark Rain Entertainment. Goh Raalhu won 7 awards, thus becoming the most-awarded film at the ceremony, while winning Best Film, Best Director for Ahmed Sinan and Best Actor for Mohamed Jumayyil.

== Winners and nominees ==
The nominations and winners were announced during the same ceremony held on 22 August 2025. A total of 19 films were submitted for the awards, and a film festival featuring the submissions was held from 22 to 28 December 2024.

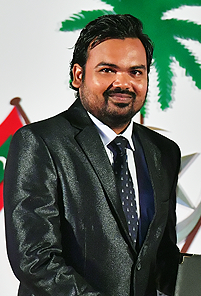
Ahmed Sinan, Best Director

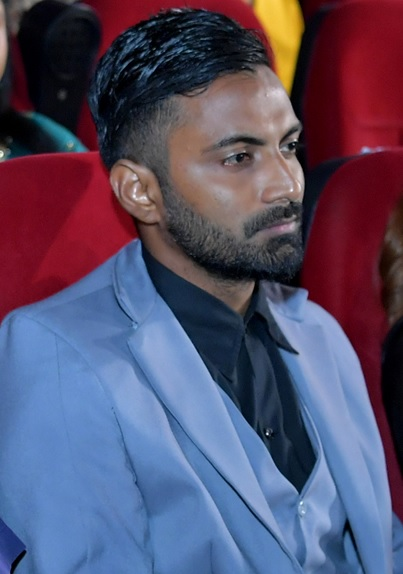
Mohamed Jumayyil, Best Actor

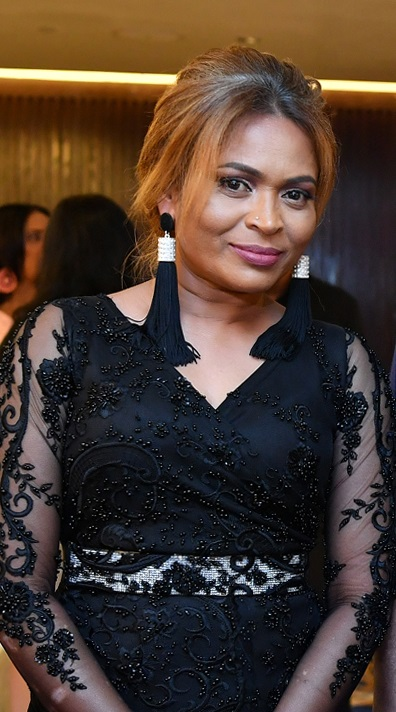
Niuma Mohamed, Best Actress

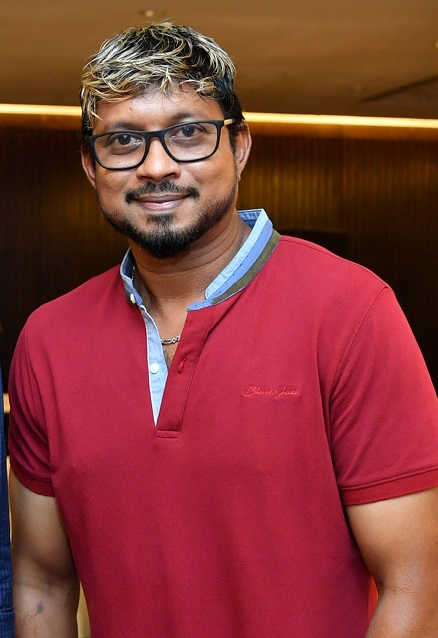
Yoosuf Shafeeu, Best Supporting Actor

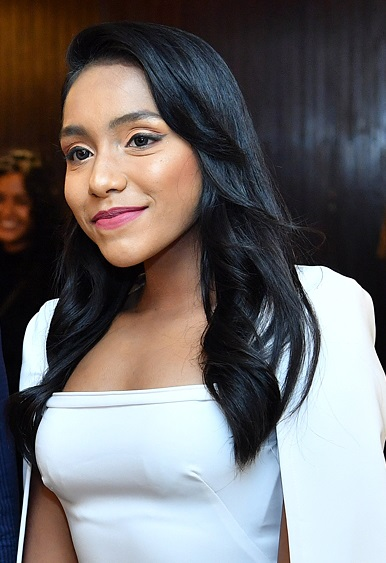
Washiya Mohamed, Best Supporting Actress

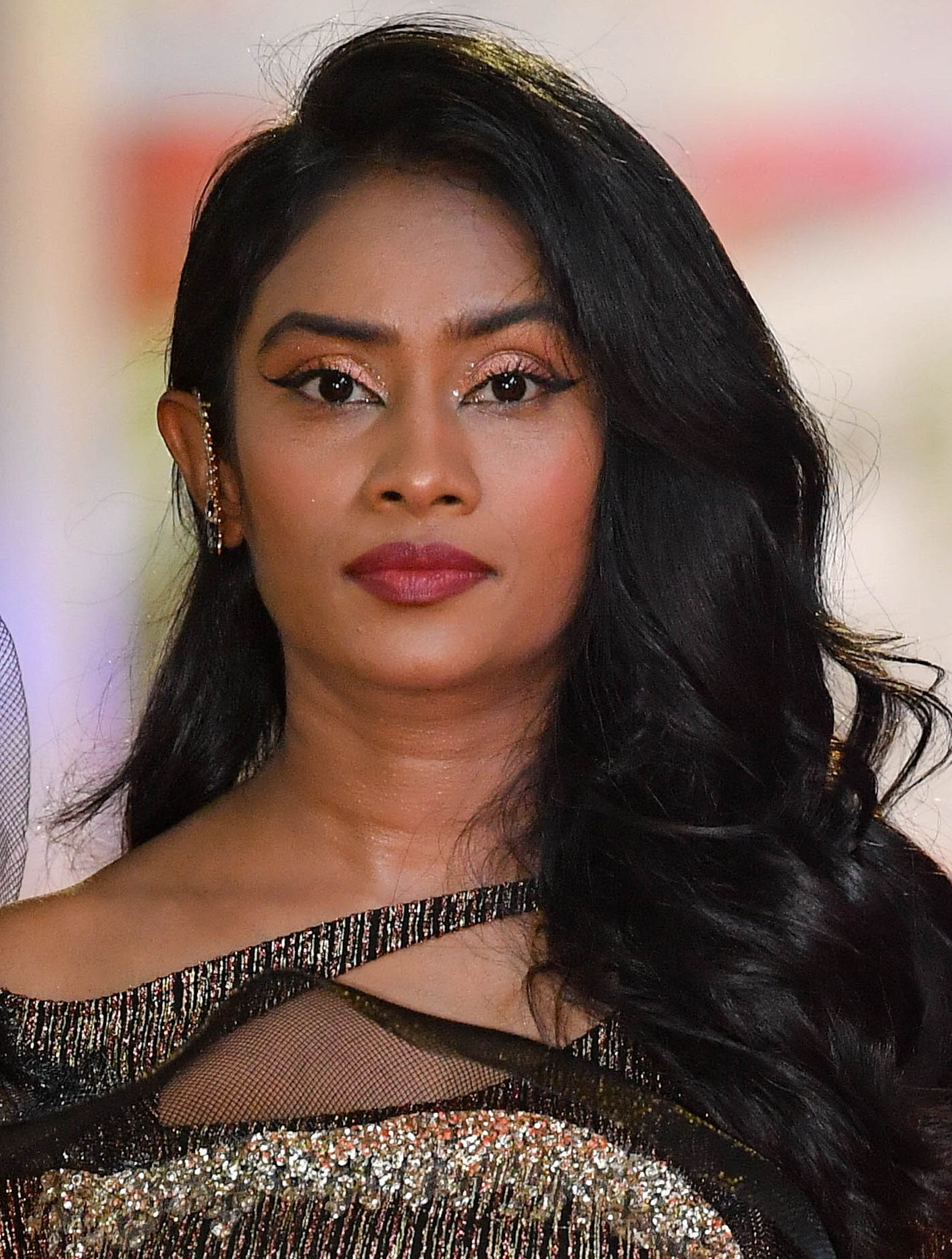
Mariyam Ashfa, Best Female Debut

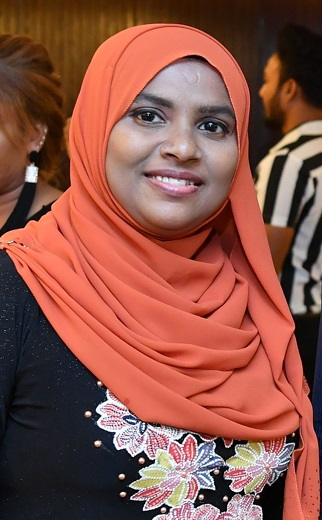
Aishath Shiranee, Lifetime Achievement Awardee

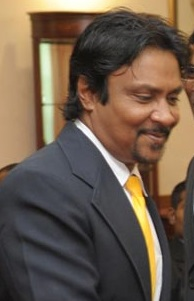
Hassan Afeef, Lifetime Achievement Awardee

=== Main awards ===
| Best Film | | Best Director |
|---|---|---|
| Goh Raalhu; Dhevansoora; Maamui; Nina; Vakin Loabin | | Ahmed Sinan – Goh Raalhu; Ali Shifau – Vakin Loabin; Ali Shifau – Maamui; Ilyas Waheed – Nina; Yoosuf Shafeeu – Dhevansoora |
| Best Lead Actor – Male | | Best Lead Actor – Female |
| Mohamed Jumayyil – Goh Raalhu; Ali Seezan – Kalhaki; Ismail Rasheed – Beeveema; Mohamed Jumayyil – Vakin Loabin; Yoosuf Shafeeu – Nivairoalhi | | Niuma Mohamed – Nivairoalhi; Aisha Ali – Free Delivery; Aminath Thasneema – Goh Raalhu; Mariyam Majudha – November; Nuzuhath Shuaib – Nina |
| Best Supporting Actor – Male | | Best Supporting Actor – Female |
| Yoosuf Shafeeu – Kalhaki; Ahmed Sunee – Maamui; Ali Azim – Loabi Vevijje; Mohamed Jumayyil – Maamui; Mohamed Manik – Kalhaki | | Washiya Mohamed – Hehes; Mariyam Majudha – Maamui; Aminath Rishfa – Kalhaki; Mariyam Majudha – Hindhukolheh; Mariyam Shakeela – Nivairoalhi |
| Best Debut – Male | | Best Debut – Female |
| Hassan Irufan – Goh Raalhu; Ali Raufath Sodiq – Free Delivery; Adhuham Layal Qasim – Noontha?; Ahmed Bassam – 40+; Mohamed Emau – Jokaru | | Mariyam Ashfa – Beeveema; Aishath Thasneema – Goh Raalhu; Aminath Rashfa – Goh Raalhu; Nuzuhath Shuaib – Vakin Loabin; Thaathi Adam – Free Delivery |
Specific Acting Awards
| Best Comedian | Best Negative Role | Best Child Artist |
| Ali Raufath Sodiq – Free Delivery; Aisha Ali – Free Delivery; Hamdhan Farooq – Maamui; Nuzuhath Shuaib – Vakin Loabin; Sheela Najeeb – Maamui | Hassan Irufaan – Goh Raalhu; Ahmed Easa – Dhauvath; Ahmed Shakir – Maamui; Ali Azim – Dhevansoora; Hamdhoon Farooq – Nina | Mariyam Yaala Shifau – Vakin Loabin; Mariyam Zoya Hassan – Nivairoalhi; Rizwana Ibrahim – Kaaku? |
Music Awards
| Best Playback Singer – Male | | Best Playback Singer – Female |
| Shammoon Mohamed - "Lafzu" - November; Hamoodh Ahmed - "Hithuga Nasha Raany" - Vakin Loabin; Shammoon Mohamed - "Inthizaarey" - November; Shammoon Mohamed - "Dhuniye Dhauruva" - Vakin Loabin; Sofwan Ali - "Qaathil" - Goh Raalhu | | Mariyam Ashfa - "Moosun" - November; Mariyam Ashfa - "Aa Ummeedh" - Nina; Mariyam Ashfa - "Hiy Adhu Ronee" - Beeveema; Mira Mohamed Majid - "Gellifa" - Beeveema; Mira Mohamed Majid - "Qaathil" - Goh Raalhu |
| Best Original Song | | Best Lyrics |
| Shammoon Mohamed - "Moosun" - November | | Mohamed Abdul Ghanee - "Aa Ummeedhu" - Nina; Mohamed Abdul Ghanee - "Raalheh Hen" - Goh Raalhu; Shammoon Mohamed - "Sirru" - Beeveema; Shammoon Mohamed - "Yo!" - Hindhukolheh; Shammoon Mohamed - "Dhuniye Dhauruva" - Vakin Loabin |
Writing Awards
| Best Story | | Best Original Screenplay |
| Ilyas Waheed – Bavathi; Ahmed Zareer – Beeveema; Ilyas Waheed – Nina; Moomin Fuad – Goh Raalhu; Moomin Fuad – Nivairoalhi | | Yoosuf Shafeeu – Dhevansoora; Aishath Fuad, Ahmed Tholal – Maamui; Ilyas Waheed – Free Delivery; Moomin Fuad – Goh Raalhu; Yoosuf Shafeeu – 40+ |

=== Technical awards ===
| Best Editor | Best Cinematographer | Best Choreography |
|---|---|---|
| Ali Shifau – Maamui; Yoosuf Shafeeu – Dhevansoora; Ahmed Sinan – Goh Raalhu; Ali Shifau – Vakin Loabin; Ilyas Waheed, Mohamed Abdul Ghanee – Free Delivery | Ibrahim Moosa – Dhevansoora; Ali Shifau, Ahmed Sinan – Maamui; Ali Shifau, Ahmed Sinan – November; Ahmed Sinan, Adam Waseem – Goh Raalhu; Ibrahim Moosa – Hehes | Sharaful Ameen – Bavathi; Hussain Hazim – November; Hussain Hazim – Hindhukolheh; Ismail Jumaih – Maamui; Yoosuf Shafeeu – Dhauvath |
| Best Makeup – Glamour | Best Makeup – Special Effects | Best Costume Designer |
| Hussain Hazim – Maamui; Hussain Hazim – Vakin Loabin; Hussain Hazim – November; Mariyam Shifa – Hehes; Ruthuba Ahmed – Nina | Ismail Jumaih – Goh Raalhu; Fathimath Shizna – 40+; Ruthuba Ahmed – Bavathi; Ruthuba Ahmed – Nina; Yoosuf Shafeeu, Mohamed Faisal – Dhevansoora | Noora Rasheed – Noontha?; Asma Waheed – Bavathi; Hussain Hazim – Vakin Loabin; Ismail Jumaih, Hussain Hazim – Maamui; Jadhulla Ismail – 40+ |
| Best Visual Effects | Best Sound Engineer | Background Score |
| Mohamed Samy – Bavathi; Ahmed Sinan – Maamui; Ahmed Sinan – Goh Raalhu; Ahmed Sinan – Vakin Loabin; Mohamed Usham – Dhauvath | Abdul Basith – Dhauvath; Ali Shifau, Ahmed Sinan – Goh Raalhu; Ali Shifau – Hindhukolheh; Ali Shifau – November; Ahmed Shahudh – Nina | Mohamed Ikram – Vakin Loabin; Abdul Basith – 40+; Abdul Basith – Dhauvath; Ahmed Shaheed – Nina; Ismail Adheel – Goh Raalhu |

=== Special awards ===
Chilhiya Moosa Manik Lifetime Achievement Award
- Aishath Shiranee
- Hassan Afeef

== Superlatives ==
Multiple nominations
| Nominations | Film |
|---|---|
| 19 | Goh Raalhu |
| 15 | Maamui |
| 14 | Vakin Loabin |
| 11 | Nina |
| 9 | November |
| 7 | Dhevansoora |
| 7 | Free Delivery |
| 6 | Beeveema |
| 5 | 40+ |
| 5 | Bavathi |
| 5 | Dhauvath |
| 5 | Nivairoalhi |
| 4 | Hindhukolheh |
| 4 | Kalhaki |
| 3 | Hehes |
| 2 | Noontha? |

Multiple wins
| Awards | Film |
|---|---|
| 7 | Goh Raalhu |
| 3 | Bavathi |
| 3 | Dhevansoora |
| 3 | November |
| 2 | Free Delivery |
| 2 | Maamui |
| 2 | Vakin Loabin |

== See also ==
- Gaumee Film Awards
