= Loabi Vias =

Maldivian web series

- Screenplay by: Mariyam Moosa
- Story by: Mariyam Moosa
- Directed by: Mohamed Faisal
- Country of origin: Maldives
- Original language: Divehi
- No. of seasons: 1
- No. of episodes: 8

Production
- Producer: Coco Studio
- Cinematography: Hassan Haleem
- Editor: Mohamed Faisal

Original release
- Release: August 26 – October 14, 2021

Loabi Vias is a Maldivian romantic drama web series directed by Mohamed Faisal. Produced by Coco Studio, it stars Nuzuhath Shuaib, Nashidha Mohamed, Mariyam Majudha, Mohamed Faisal and Ahmed Easa in main roles. The pilot episode of the series was released on 26 August 2021.

== Cast and characters ==
=== Main ===
- Nuzuhath Shuaib as Zeyba
- Nashidha Mohamed as Athika
- Mariyam Majudha as Saha
- Mohamed Faisal as Wijadh
- Ahmed Easa as Mohamed Maakil
- Ahmed Asim as Fayaz

=== Recurring ===
- Fathimath Faina
- Aufa Ibrahim
- Ahmed Shaan
- Mohamed Rifshan as Ramiz
- Aiminath Shamra as Mizna
- Aishath Shifana as Nasiha; Athika's friend
- Abdulla Maaiz Ahmed
- Mohamed Rashaadh

== Episodes ==
No. in season	Title	Directed by	Original release date
1	"Episode 1"	Mohamed Faisal	August 26, 2021
Wijadh (Mohamed Faisal), a responsible father of a five years old daughter is married to an insolent wife, Athika (Nashidha Mohamed). His subordinate, Saha (Mariyam Majudha) is married to a jobless man, Maakil (Ahmed Easa). Wijadh puts an advertisement to hire a private tutor, which catches the attention of a primary teacher, Zeyba (Nuzuhath Shuaib) who is dealing with a heartbreak.
2	"Episode 2"	Mohamed Faisal	September 2, 2021
Athika avoids her husband on bed and becomes distressed for her ignorance. Saha is worried about Makil and begs him to be more responsible in their marriage.
3	"Episode 3"	Mohamed Faisal	September 9, 2021
When Athika ignores his desires, Wijadh goes for an outside walk where he runs into Zeyba trying to flee from her vengeful ex-husband, Ramiz (Mohamed Rifshan). Coerced by his friends, Maakil treats his wife badly.
4	"Episode 4"	Mohamed Faisal	September 16, 2021
Wijadh is slowly attracted to Zeyba while Saha is concerned about her husband. Wijadh shares his sudden outburst of feelings and towards Zeyba, to his friend, Fayaz (Ahmed Asim), who advises him to communicate with Athika and not to control his desires.
5	"Episode 5"	Mohamed Faisal	September 23, 2021
Zeyba's brother gets hit by a motorcycle raced by Maakil and was shortly declared dead. Zeyba has a hard time coping with the recent loss in her family while Maakin hides the details of the accident from his wife. Meanwhile, Saha starts an extramarital affair with Fayaz. Ramiz starts threatening Zeyba via messages.
6	"Episode 6"	Mohamed Faisal	September 30, 2021
Athika is worried her husband is cheating on her. Wijadh is attracted to the kind nature of Zeyba and is convinced that she can fill the void in his heart. Therefore, he proposes to Zeyba much to her discomfort. Maakil confronts Saha and the latter asks for a divorce.
7	"Episode 7"	Mohamed Faisal	October 7, 2021
Wijad agrees to initially convince Athika to seek the help of a doctor or psychiatrist to understand their barrier and Zeyba promises that she will Wijad only if Athika refuse the help. Maakil is taken to police for questioning about the accident.
8	"Episode 8"	Mohamed Faisal	October 14, 2021
Maakil and Saha reconcile and she agrees to give him one last chance to reform. Zeyba has a second opinion for her marriage proposal while Athika decides to leave Wijadh for his decision to marry Zeyba.

== Soundtrack ==
Track listing
No.	Title	Lyrics	Music	Singer(s)	Length
1.	"Loabiviyas"	Hassan Haleem	Munaz	Samah, Andhala Haleem

== Release and reception ==
The series was made available for streaming through Baiskoafu on 26 August 2021. Upon release, the series mainly got positive reviews from critics. The series was ranked second position at Baiskoafu Original Chart revealed on 3 December 2021.
