= Mikoe Bappa Baey Baey =

- Official film poster
- Directed by: Ravee Farooq
- Screenplay by: Mahdi Ahmed
- Produced by: Mohamed Ali
- Starring: Mohamed Manik; Aishath Rishmy
- Cinematography: Ali Shifau; Ahmed Sinan
- Edited by: Ravee Farooq
- Music by: Mohamed Ikram
- Production company: Dark Rain Entertainment
- Release date: August 12, 2015
- Running time: 90 minutes
- Country: Maldives
- Language: Dhivehi

Mikoe Bappa Baey Baey is a 2015 Maldivian thriller film directed by Ravee Farooq. Produced by Mohamed Ali under Dark Rain Entertainment, the film stars Mohamed Manik and Aishath Rishmy in pivotal roles. The film was released on 12 August 2015. It was one of the three entries from Maldives to the SAARC Film Festival 2016.

The film depicts a man supposedly suffering from amnesia, and his interactions with a woman who claims to be his wife.

== Plot ==
The film opens when Ahmed Fazeel/Mohamed Saleem (Mohamed Manik) wakes up to an unfamiliar environment. Everything he sees seems to be queer and unrecognizable. When he starts looking and discovering things around him, he is amazed by seeing a baby monitor. A while later, he hears a baby crying. The sound is transmitted from the monitor, followed by a women's lullaby. He is further astonished, when he realizes that he is wearing a wedding ring on his finger. As a result he gets confused concerning his identity.

After a few minutes, Aminath Shifa/Nisha (Aishath Rishmy) enters the room and behaves like his wife. She tried to convince him that he is Fazeel. She reveals that he met with an accident, and can only remember things that happened recently. She medicates him in order for him to recover. However, since no change has been identified, he loses control and get furious. In return she had to hurt him in order to save their baby.

She struggles enough to save their wedding and their baby. His past and present is revealed in bits, before the truth is finally revealed.

== Cast ==
- Mohamed Manik as Ahmed Fazeel and Mohamed Saleem
- Aishath Rishmy as Aminath Shifa and Nisha
- Koyya Hassan Manik as Bodube
- Ali Waheedh
- Ahmed Nashith
- Ismail Areef

== Development ==
Pre-production of the film began in 2012, but faced various delays and some setback. Director Ravi Farooq states that the delay was necessary in perfecting the film and improving various technical issues of it.

It was the first Maldivian film that has been extensively shot using a photo camera. The story of the film was originally written by Ahmed Rasheed from Mandheyra Productions which is based in L. Fonadhoo. This was the second of the trilogy which Mahdi and Farooq have decided to produce based on the theme of one set, one day, two characters, proceeded by Ingili.

== Release and response ==
The film was released on 12 July 2015. The film continued its run at Olympus for further two days. The film was later shown at Olympys cinema on both 20 and 21 August 2015.

The film was positively received by the critics; Aishath Rishmy's acting has been applauded by the critics in particular. Aishath Maahaa from Vaguthu gave the film 4.5 out of 5 stars and appraised the risk taken by the whole crew in bringing the film. She perceived that every actor in the film brought the perfect expressions to their faces. Singling out Rishmy, she wrote: "With this film, she proved that she is not only a great dancer, but also a great actor". Concluding her review, Maahaa chose the film as one of the most different film ever released in the industry and affirmed that the production team had fully justified the 3 years spent in production.

== Accolades ==
Award	Category	Recipient(s) and nominee(s)	Result	Ref(s)
8th Gaumee Film Awards	Best film	Mikoe Bappa Baey Baey	Nominated	
8th Gaumee Film Awards	Best Director	Ravee Farooq	Nominated	
8th Gaumee Film Awards	Best Actress	Aishath Rishmy	Nominated	
8th Gaumee Film Awards	Best Editing	Ravee Farooq	Nominated	
8th Gaumee Film Awards	Best Cinematography	Ali Shifau	Nominated	
8th Gaumee Film Awards	Best Screenplay	Mahdi Ahmed	Nominated	
8th Gaumee Film Awards	Best Sound Editing	Mohamed Ikram	Won	
8th Gaumee Film Awards	Best Sound Mixing	Mohamed Ikram	Nominated	
8th Gaumee Film Awards	Best Art Direction	Mohamed Ali, Ravee Farooq, Ali Shifau	Nominated	
8th Gaumee Film Awards	Best Visual Effects	Ahmed Sinan	Nominated	
