= Gaumee Film Award for Best Makeup =

- Awarded for: Best Makeup
- Country: Maldives
- Presented by: National Centre for the Arts

The Gaumee Film Award for Best Makeup is given as part of the Gaumee Film Awards for Maldivian Films.

The award was first given in 1994. Here is a list of the award winners and the nominees of the respective award ceremonies.

== Winners and nominees ==
Year	Photos of winners	Actress	Film	Ref(s)
1st (1995)		Ismail Wajeeh, Mohamed Hilmy	Ihsaas	
1st (1995)		No Other Nominee		
2nd (1997)		Aishath Ali Manik	Edhuvas Hingajje	
2nd (1997)		No Other Nominee		
3rd (2007)		Mahdi Ahmed, Mohamed Niyaz	Amaanaaiy	
3rd (2007)		No Other Nominee		
4th (2007)		Abdul Faththaah	Vehey Vaarey Therein	
4th (2007)		No Other Nominee		
5th (2008)		Hassan Adam	Hukuru Vileyrey	
5th (2008)		Fathimath Fareela	Vaaloabi Engeynama	
5th (2008)		No Other Nominee		
6th (2015)		Mohamed Manik	Niuma	
6th (2015)		Mohamed Manik	Yoosuf	
6th (2015)		Mohamed Manik	Zalzalaa En'buri Aun	
6th (2015)		Mohamed Manik	Dhin Veynuge Hithaamaigaa	
6th (2015)		Hassan Adam	Fanaa	
7th (2016)		Hassan Adam	Fathis Handhuvaruge Feshun 3D	
7th (2016)		Ravee Farooq, Hussain Muawwar	Ingili	
7th (2016)		Fathimath Azifa	Loodhifa	
7th (2016)		Hassan Adam	Love Story	
7th (2016)		Niuma Mohamed, Fathimath Azifa	Sazaa	
8th (2017)		Mariyam Majudha	Hulhudhaan	
8th (2017)		Mariyam Majudha	Vaashey Mashaa Ekee	
8th (2017)		Zeenath Abbas	Ahsham	
8th (2017)		Ismail Jumaih, Ahmed Fayaz	4426	
8th (2017)		Mariyam Majudha	Emme Fahu Vindha Jehendhen	
9th (2019)	Not Awarded			

== See also ==
- Gaumee Film Awards
