= Mohamed Faisal (actor) =

Maldivian actor, editor and director

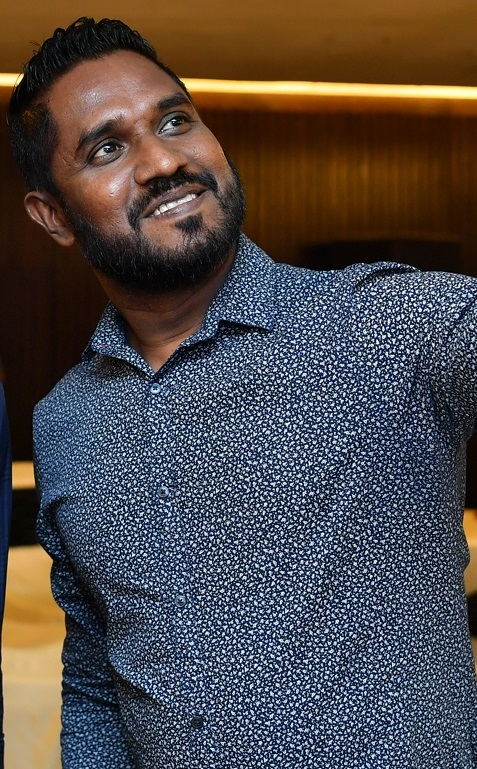
- Faisal at Niuma Mohamed's Silver Jubilee celebration event, 2019
- Born: 23 April 1980 (age 46); Male', Maldives
- Occupations: Actor, editor, director and graphic designer
- Years active: 2009–present

Mohamed Faisal is a Maldivian film actor, editor and director.

== Career ==
Faisal made his film debut with the romantic film Loaiybahtakaa (2009), written and directed by Yoosuf Shafeeu in which he stars as businessman from a wealthy family struggling to express his feelings. The romantic drama, co-starring Sheela Najeeb, Fathimath Fareela and Yoosuf Shafeeu, tells the story of unrequited love, and proved to be a commercial success. His performance in the film garnered him a nomination at 1st Maldives Film Awards ceremony. This was followed by Ali Shifau-directed family drama Dhin Veynuge Hithaamaigaa (2010) which showcases discrimination against the islanders, family revenge and fatherhood responsibilities. The film was believed to be a "huge improvement" over the recent Maldivian films and was declared to be a commercial success. Faisal's only release of 2012 was Abdul Faththaah's romantic film Love Story alongside Ali Seezan, Amira Ismail and Aishath Rishmy. Displeased with the screenplay and performance of the actors, Nadheem of Haveeru wrote: "None of the actors were given scope to build their characters and none was able to justify their character. With excessive emotional scenes, actors were exposed to over-acting and nothing more". The last release of 2010 featured Manik in the drama film Heyonuvaane (2010) which was directed by Yoosuf Shafeeu and starring opposite Shafeeu, Sheela Najeeb and Fathimath Fareela. The story revolves around a male who is a victim of domestic abuse. Even though the film mainly received negative reviews from critics, it emerged as the second highest grossing Maldivian release of the year.

In 2013, Faisal featured in Ali Shifau-directed horror film Fathis Handhuvaruge Feshun 3D which serves as a prequel to Fathis Handhuvaru (1997) starring Reeko Moosa Manik and Niuma Mohamed in lead roles. It was based on a story by Ibrahim Waheed, Jinaa: Fathis Handhuvaruge Feshun (2009), which itself is a prequel to the story Fathishandhuvaru (1996) written by himself which was later adapted to a film by same name in 1997. The film was marketed as being the first 3D release for a Maldivian film and the first release derived from spin-off. Upon release the film received generally negative reviews from critics while his performance was considered to be "forgettable". Next, he collaborated with Hussain Munawwar for his second direction, the revenge thriller film Dhilakani (2013) alongside Ismail Rasheed, Mohamed Manik, Niuma Mohamed and Aminath Rishfa. The film deals with a man's tumultuous journey to seek vengeance and the demolition of family bond over a girl. The film attracted negative reception from critics while Nadheem wrote: "Embraced with futile characters, impractical scenes and out-dated music, the film has problems in each department. Little to no praise shall be regarded to Faisal who played a useless character with no impression".

In 2015, Faisal stepped into the seat of direction by co-directing Fathimath Nahula's 13 episodes television drama series, Umurah Salaan (2015) which centers on a squabble family which is separated due to the greed for money and misunderstandings. The series which stars Mariyam Azza, Aminath Rishfa and Ahmed Azmeel in lead roles, Faisal portrays the character Ashraf, a forthright businessman who marries an orphan. Also, he starred in Nahula and Aishath Rishmy's television drama series, Vakivumuge Kurin where he played the caring husband who struggles to deal with his seductive colleague.

2016 was a successful year for Faisal where he starred in the three highest grossing Maldivian films of the year. His first release of was the Ali Shifau-directed romantic comedy Vaashey Mashaa Ekee (2016) opposite Mohamed Jumayyil and Mariyam Majudha. His performance as a brainwashing friend was widely appreciated in the reviews; Ahmed Nadheem from Avas picked Faisal as his most favorite performer in the film. "I personally believe that Faisal is an actor who overacts in all of his previous films, but this comes as a pleasing improvement". He then played the role of Nihad, member of the friends who get trapped in a haunted house, in Fathimath Nahula's horror film 4426 (2016). Upon release, the film received mostly positive reviews from critics and was declared as the highest grossing Maldivian film of the year. Ahmed Nadheem of Avas labelled the film as a "masterpiece" and noted his performance to be "good". Shafeeu-directed Baiveriyaa (2016), a comedy film featuring an ensemble cast was his second release of the year. The film revolves around an aspiring actress who flees from her family to pursue a career in the industry and the suspicions and confusions that follows. Upon release the film was positively received by critics. Nazim Hassan of Avas applauded the comical timing of the characters and wrote: "The film explores a different side of Faisal where he proves his versatility by delivering a notable performance in the comedy scenes, not to mention the dance sequences; another surprise from him". The following year he starred in a romantic comedy film Mee Loaybakee which was directed by Ali Shifau. The film emerged as one of the highest grossing Maldivian films of 2017.

2018 was a dull year for Maldivian film-industry with regards to 2018 Maldivian presidential election, hence only one film of Faisal was released during the year; a suspense thriller film Dhevansoora (2018) written and directed by Yoosuf Shafeeu. The film marks Shafeeu's thirtieth direction and features an ensemble cast of twenty-one actors. Revolving around a murder investigating, he played a police officer and the investigation head trying to solve the murder mystery. The film received positive reviews from critics and was considered a "norm-breaker" for the Maldivian cinema. Ahmed Hameed Adam reviewing from VNews applauded Faisal's versatility since he was believed to be "stereotyped" as a comedian. "No argument shall settle to dispute the fact that this is the best performance of Faisal. He has extracted his best through this character". Ismail Nail Rasheed from Raajje.mv wrote: "Though remembered for his comic roles, Faisal is surprisingly great in the serious role specially during the moments of sudden realization". His next release of the year was another collaboration with Fathimath Nahula, the first Maldivian web-series, Huvaa. The series consisting of sixty episodes and streamed through the digital platform Baiskoafu, centers around a happy and radiant family which breaks into despairing pieces after a tragic incident that led to an unaccountable loss. The series and his performance as an introvert and dedicated son searching for his birth mother were positively received.

The following year, he starred in Yoosuf Shafeeu's horror comedy film 40+ (2019), a sequel to 2017 released comedy film Naughty 40, which was well received both critically and commercially. This was followed by another direction from Shafeeu, a romantic horror film which follows a happily married couple who goes on a honeymoon trip and the paranormal activities they experience due to black-magic. Mariyam Waheedha from Miadhu considers his portrayal of the character Majdhee to be "different from his previous works".

== Filmography ==
=== Feature film ===
Year	Title	Role	Notes	Ref(s)
2009	Loaiybahtakaa	Zaid	Nominated—Maldives Film Award for Best Actor	
2010	Dhin Veynuge Hithaamaigaa	Faiz		
2013	Fathis Handhuvaruge Feshun 3D	Adam Saleem		
2013	Dhilakani	Shanil		
2014	Hulhudhaan	Maahir	Also the editor	
2016	Vaashey Mashaa Ekee	Thobe	Nominated—Gaumee Film Award for Best Supporting Actor	
2016	4426	Nihad	Also the editor	
2016	Baiveriyaa	Bassam		
2017	Mee Loaybakee	Imran		
2018	Dhevansoora	Thoha		
2019	40+	Akram		
2019	Dhauvath	Majdhee		
2025	Alifaan	Saatu		
2025	Ilzaam	Shaheem		

=== Television ===
Year	Title	Role	Notes	Ref(s)
2003–2004	Vaisoori	Various roles	6 segments; 11 episodes	
2006–2007	Vaguthu Faaithu Nuvanees	Marriage witness	Guest role; 2 episodes	
2009	Mihithah Loabi Dheyshey	Shareef	Recurring role; 3 episodes	
2012–2013	Adhives Eloaibah Gadharu Kuran	Mohamed Asim	Main role	
2015	Vakivumuge Kurin	Shahid Shafeeq	Main role; 15 episodes	
2015–2016	Umurah Salaan	Ashraf	Also co-director Main role; 13 episodes	
2018–2020	Huvaa	Ahmed Nazim Hassan	Also co-director and editor Main role; 89 episodes	
2019	Yes Sir	Various characters	Recurring role	
2020–2021	Huvaa Kohfa Bunan	Javid	Main role	
2021	Rumi á Jannat	Nadhir "Nadey"	Main role; 14 episodes Also co-director	
2021	Loabi Vias	Wijadh	Main role; 8 episodes Also director and editor	
2021–2022	Giritee Loabi	Umaru	Recurring role; 22 episodes	
2021	Giridha	Director Sibzaud	Guest role; "Episode 13"	
2022	Baby	Siraj	Guest role; "Episode 3"	
2023	Gareena	Rilwan	Main role Also the director	
2024	Dark Rain Chronicles	Azim	Main role in the segment "Dejavu"	

=== Short film ===
Year	Title	Role	Notes	Ref(s)
2009	Bulhaa Dhombe	Teacher		

=== Other work ===
Year	Title	Director	Editor	Camera	Notes	Ref(s)
2014	Hulhudhaan		Yes		Nominated—Gaumee Film Award for Best Editing	
2018–present	Huvaa	Yes	Yes		Web series; Co-directed with Fathimath Nahula and Yoosuf Shafeeu	
2021	Rumi á Jannat	Yes			Web series; Co-directed with Ali Shifau	
2021	Loabi Vias	Yes	Yes		Web series	
2024	Bibii		Yes		Feature film	
2025	Moosun	Yes		Yes	Web series; 10 episodes	
2026	Ekaniveri Hithakun...	Yes	Yes	Yes	TV series	

== Accolades ==
Year	Award	Category	Nominated work	Result	Ref(s)
2011	1st Maldives Film Awards	Best Actor	Loaiybahtakaa	Nominated	
2017	8th Gaumee Film Awards	Best Supporting Actor	Vaashey Mashaa Ekee	Nominated	
2017	8th Gaumee Film Awards	Best Editing	Hulhudhaan (Shared with Ahmed Shakir, Ravee Farooq, Ahmed Sinan)	Nominated	
2025	1st MSPA Film Awards	Best Makeup – Special Effects	Dhevansoora (Shared with Yoosuf Shafeeu)	Nominated	
