= Hulhudhaan =

- Official film poster
- Directed by: Aishath Fuad Thaufeeq
- Written by: Aishath Fuad Thaufeeq
- Produced by: Mohamed Ali
- Starring: Mariyam Majudha; Roanu Hassan Manik; Ravee Farooq; Ahmed Saeed
- Cinematography: Ali Shifau; Ahmed Sinan
- Edited by: Ravee Farooq; Ahmed Shakir; Ahmed Sinan; Mohamed Faisal
- Music by: Mohamed Ikram
- Production company: Dark Rain Entertainment
- Release date: December 25, 2014
- Country: Maldives
- Language: Dhivehi
- Budget: MVR 220,000

Hulhudhaan is a 2014 Maldivian film directed by Aishath Fuad Thaufeeq. Produced by Mohamed Ali for Dark Rain Entertainment, the film stars Mariyam Majudha and Roanu Hassan Manik in pivotal roles. The film was released on 12 December 2014.

== Cast ==
- Mariyam Majudha as Sama
- Roanu Hassan Manik as Manik
- Ravee Farooq as Dr. Asif
- Ahmed Saeed as Rashad
- Ahmed Nashith as Eddy
- Mohamed Faisal as Maahir
- Mariyam Shakeela as Nurse
- Ali Shazleem as Asif
- Adam Rizwee as Ihusaan

== Release and reception ==
The film was released on 12 December 2014. Only one showing of the film was premiered at Olympus Cinema. The film was later screened at the Venice Film Festival.

The film opened to a positive response from critics. Ahmed Nadheem of Avas praised the direction by Thaufeeq and performance by lead actors. However, criticising the "quick end" of the film, Nadheem considered that the film is "award-worthy" and deserves more shows to be screened.

== Accolades ==
| Award | Category | Recipients | Result | Ref. |
|---|---|---|---|---|
| 8th Gaumee Film Awards | Best film | Hulhudhaan | Nominated | |
| 8th Gaumee Film Awards | Best Director | Aishath Fuad Thaufeeq | Nominated | |
| 8th Gaumee Film Awards | Best Actor | Roanu Hassan Manik | Nominated | |
| 8th Gaumee Film Awards | Best Actress | Mariyam Majudha | Nominated | |
| 8th Gaumee Film Awards | Best Supporting Actor | Ravee Farooq | Nominated | |
| 8th Gaumee Film Awards | Best Female Debut | Mariyam Majudha | Won | |
| 8th Gaumee Film Awards | Best Lyricist | Zero Degree for "Thakurah Baheh" | Won | |
| 8th Gaumee Film Awards | Male Playback Singer | Ahmed Nashid for "Thakurah Baheh" | Won | |
| 8th Gaumee Film Awards | Best Editing | Ahmed Shakir, Ravee Farooq, Ahmed Sinan and Mohamed Faisal | Nominated | |
| 8th Gaumee Film Awards | Best Cinematography | Ali Shifau and Ahmed Sinan | Nominated | |
| 8th Gaumee Film Awards | Best Screenplay | Aishath Fuad Thaufeeg | Won | |
| 8th Gaumee Film Awards | Best Sound Editing | Haisham Shafeeq | Nominated | |
| 8th Gaumee Film Awards | Best Art Direction | Aishath Fuad Thaufeeq, Mohamed Ali | Nominated | |
| 8th Gaumee Film Awards | Best Visual Effects | Ahmed Sinan | Nominated | |
| 8th Gaumee Film Awards | Best Costume Design | Aishath Fuad Thaufeeq, Mariyam Majudha | Nominated | |
| 8th Gaumee Film Awards | Best Makeup | Mariyam Majudha | Won | |
