= E Re'ah Fahu =

2016 Maldivian film

- Official film poster
- Directed by: Ahmed Nimal
- Written by: Mohamed Aboobakuru
- Screenplay by: Mohamed Aboobakuru
- Produced by: Hussain Rasheed
- Starring: Ali Seezan; Sujeetha Abdulla
- Cinematography: Mohamed Aboobakuru
- Edited by: Ahmed Nimal; Mohamed Aboobakuru
- Production company: Fariva Films
- Release date: February 4, 2016
- Country: Maldives
- Language: Dhivehi

E Re'ah Fahu is a 2016 Maldivian horror film directed by Ahmed Nimal. Produced by Hussain Rasheed under Fariva Films, the film stars Ali Seezan and Sujeetha Abdulla. The film also stars Nimal and Fathimath Muslima in supporting roles. The film was released on 4 February 2016.

== Plot ==
Ikuleel (Ali Seezan) and his girlfriend Fathimath (Sujeetha Abdulla) engage in premarital sex in an abandoned house. Fathimath notices a change in Ikuleel's behavior when she meets him at different times of the day. He refuses to acknowledge any conversation they have in the midnight. Things get worse when Fathimath discovers that she is pregnant to the child of a spirit in disguise of Ikuleel.

== Cast ==
- Ali Seezan as Ikuleel
- Sujeetha Abdulla as Fathimath
- Ahmed Nimal as Razzaq
- Shafiu Mohamed as Ikuleel's friend
- Fathimath Muflihaa as Khadheeja; Fathimath's sister
- Abdul Rahman
- Aminath Abdul Rahman as Hawwa
- Ahmed Shifau
- Mohamed Waheed as Waheed; Khadheeja's ex-husband
- Hussain Ziyad
- Shiyad Ibrahim Rasheed
- Abdul Muhusin
- Adhham Mohamed

== Soundtrack ==
Track listing
| No. | Title | Singer(s) | Length |
|---|---|---|---|
| 1. | "Mi Dhulun Thiya Faraathah" | Hassan Ilham, Rafiyath Rameeza |
| 2. | "Karunain Mi Themi" | Hassan Ilham |
| 3. | "Loabivumakee Kushakee Hey?" | Hassan Sobir |

== Release and reception ==
The film released on 4 February 2016, received negative response from critics and was declared a flop.

== Accolades ==
| Award | Category | Recipients | Result | Ref. |
|---|---|---|---|---|
| 8th Gaumee Film Awards | Best Visual Effects | Ali Riyaz | Nominated | |
