= Ahmed Shakir =

Maldivian actor

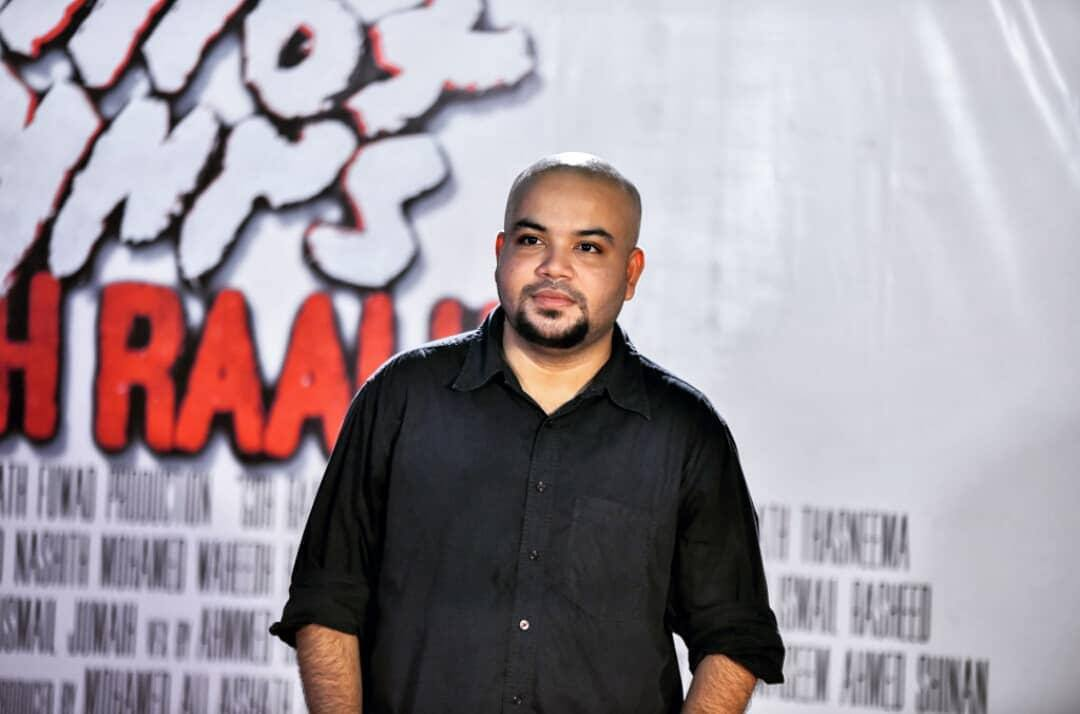
- Ahmed Shakir attending the red carpet event of his film "Gohraalhu"
- Born: 4 September 1991 (age 35); Male', Maldives
- Occupations: Actor, Editor
- Years active: 2014–present

Ahmed Shakir (a.k.a. Sharkko Ammadey) (born 4 September 1991) is a Maldivian actor and editor. He initial worked with the Dark Rain Entertainment team in technical department, prior to starring in small roles from the production company including the romantic comedies Vaashey Mashaa Ekee (2016), Mee Loaybakee (2017) and Vakin Loabin (2018). He had his breakthrough performance in another production from Dark Rain Entertainment, the comedy film Maamui (2019) in which he portrayed a dangerous gangster. Following this success, he continued working in several web series including the comedy sitcom Rumi á Jannat, the romantic comedy Giritee Loabi and the revenge thriller anthology Dark Rain Chronicles.

== Career ==
Shakir made his film debut in the romantic comedy Vaashey Mashaa Ekee (2016), produced by Dark Rain Entertainment and directed by Ali Shifau. Appearing in a small role, he did not receive much acclaim, as he was considered somewhat "lost" in the large cast. However, Ahmed Nadheem from Avas highlighted Shakir's comedy sketches as a "pleasant surprise" in the film. It emerged as one of the highest grossing Maldivian films of the year. He next appeared in Ali Musthafa-directed family drama Malikaa (2017), in which he played the role of Hussen, the youngest sibling of a family that mistreats their father. Featuring Ismail Zahir, Nuzuhath Shuaib, Mohamed Jumayyil, Fathimath Azifa, Ahmed Asim, Ali Azim and Neena Saleem in prominent roles, the film received mixed reviews from critics. Ahmed Nadheem, reviewing for Avas singled out Shakir's performance as the best "male performance" among the cast. Despite low expectations from trade analysts, the film performed moderately well at the box office. This was followed by a brief role from Dark Rain Entertainment's Mee Loaybakee (2017), which became one of the highest-grossing Maldivian films of 2017.

In 2018, Shakir worked with Ali Shifau once again for the family drama Vakin Loabin (2018), where he portrayed the role of a judge dealing with the divorce of a young couple. The following year, he played the main role in Ali Shifau-directed comedy film Maamui, as a gangster willing to go extreme measures to obtain a bottle of honey that turns out to be something more valuable. Upon its release, the film received mainly positive reviews from critics, with much of the praise directed for Shakir for his villainous performance. In subsequent years, Shakir continued to work with Dark Rain Entertainment, appearing in their romantic comedy sitcom Rumi á Jannat in a recurring role, which revolves around the initial days after the wedding of a couple who are distinctly different worldviews and personalities. The same year, he featured in another romantic comedy web series from Dark Rain Entertainment, titled Giritee Loabi. In this series, he portrayed the character of Shaazly, an unfortunate husband who must delay his nuptial night due to a promise his wife made to her deceased father.

In 2022, he appeared in one of the segments of the revenge thriller anthology web series Dark Rain Chronicles, directed by Ali Shifau. In this segment titled Nostalgia, Shakir played the role of a medical trainee who seeks revenge on his bullies by poisoning them. This is followed by Ali Shifau-directed romantic film Hindhukolheh, appearing alongside Aminath Rashfa and Sharaf Abdulla, which narrates the story of a young girl about her love and self-discovery after her recent memory loss.

== Filmography ==
Key
†	Denotes films that have not yet been released

=== Feature film ===
Year	Title	Role	Notes	Ref(s)
2016	Vaashey Mashaa Ekee	Zaroon		
2017	Malikaa	Hussen		
2017	Mee Loaybakee	Maisan Shakir		
2018	Vakin Loabin	Uz. Ibrahim Adheel		
2019	Maamui	Hudhu Mukhthar		
2023	Hindhukolheh	Miadh		
2023	Free Delivery	Customer		
2024	Fureytha	Inspector	Special appearance	
2024	Bibii	Naeem		
2025	Loabin...?	Shakeel		
2025	Alifaan			
2025	Koss Gina Mistake	Love		

=== Television ===
Year	Title	Role	Notes	Ref(s)
2021	Rumi á Jannat	Mogabe	Recurring role; 7 episodes	
2021–2022	Giritee Loabi	Shaazly	Main role; 22 episodes	
2022	Dark Rain Chronicles	Nagidh	Main role in the segment "Nostalgia"	
2023	Yaaraa	Iqbal	Guest role; "Episode 2"	
2023	Girlfriends	Director	Recurring role	
2024	Dark Rain Chronicles	Shah's friend	Main role in the segment "Dhemaa"	
2025	Roaleemay	Doctor	Recurring role; 3 episodes	
2025	Hinthaa	Ahmed Nooh Abdul Sattar	Main role; 10 episodes	
2025	Moosun	Doctor	Recurring role	

=== Other work ===
Year	Title	Editor	Notes
2014	Kashfu	Yes	Nominated—Gaumee Film Award for Best Editing - Short film
2014	Hulhudhaan	Yes	Nominated—Gaumee Film Award for Best Editing

== Accolades ==
Year	Award	Category	Nominated work	Result	Ref(s)
2017	8th Gaumee Film Awards	Best Editing	Hulhudhaan (Shared with Ravee Farooq, Ahmed Sinan, Mohamed Faisal)	Nominated	
2017	8th Gaumee Film Awards	Best Editing - Short film	Kashfu (Shared with Ali Shifau)	Nominated	
2025	1st MSPA Film Awards	Best Negative Role	Maamui	Nominated	
