= Gaumee Film Award for Best Sound Editing =

- Awarded for: Best Sound Editing
- Country: Maldives
- Presented by: National Centre for the Arts

The Gaumee Film Award for Best Sound Editing is given as part of the Gaumee Film Awards for Maldivian Films.

The award was first given in 1995. Here is a list of the award winners and the nominees of the respective award ceremonies.

== Winners and nominees ==
Year	Photos of winners	Director	Film	Ref(s)
1st (1995)	Not Awarded			
2nd (1997)	Not Awarded			
3rd (2007)		Mohamed Niyaz, Mahdi Ahmed	Amaanaaiy	
3rd (2007)		No Other Nominee		
4th (2007)	Not Awarded			
5th (2008)	Not Awarded			
6th (2015)		Mohamed Ikram	Niuma	
6th (2015)		Ayyuman Shareef	Zalzalaa En'buri Aun	
6th (2015)		Fathimath Nahula, Hussain Shuhadh	Yoosuf	
7th (2016)		Haisham Shafeeq	Loodhifa	
7th (2016)		Mohamed Ikram	Ingili	
7th (2016)		Mohamed Ikram	Sazaa	
7th (2016)		Ali Musthafa	Dhilakani	
7th (2016)		Ali Shifau	Fathis Handhuvaruge Feshun 3D	
8th (2017)		Mohamed Ikram	Mikoe Bappa Baey Baey	
8th (2017)		Ali Shifau	Vaashey Mashaa Ekee	
8th (2017)		Haisham Shafeeq	Hulhudhaan	
8th (2017)		Ali Seezan, Ibrahim Wisan	Insaana	
8th (2017)		Mohamed Ikram, Ali Shifau	Emme Fahu Vindha Jehendhen	
9th (2019)		Mohamed Ikram	Vishka	
9th (2019)		Ismail Adheel	Ill Noise	
9th (2019)		Ismail Adheel	Hahdhu	
9th (2019)		Fathuhulla Shakeel	Dhevansoora	
9th (2019)		Ali Shifau	Vakin Loabin	

== See also ==
- Gaumee Film Awards
