= Gaumee Film Award for Best Visual Effects =

- Awarded for: Best Visual Effects
- Country: Maldives
- Presented by: National Centre for the Arts

The Gaumee Film Award for Best Visual Effects is given as part of the Gaumee Film Awards for Maldivian Films.

The award was first given in 1994. Here is a list of the award winners and the nominees of the respective award ceremonies.

== Winners and nominees ==
Year	Photos of winners	Visual director	Film	Ref(s)
1st (1995)		Hussain Rasheed	Karuna	
1st (1995)		No Other Nominee		
2nd (1997)	Not Awarded			
3rd (2007)	Not Awarded			
4th (2007)	Not Awarded			
5th (2008)		Ahmed Shiyam, Hamid Ibrahim, Hassan Adam	Hukuru Vileyrey	
5th (2008)		No Other Nominee		
6th (2015)	Not Awarded			
7th (2016)		Ahmed Sinan	Fathis Handhuvaruge Feshun 3D	
7th (2016)		Ahmed Shiham	Loodhifa	
8th (2017)		Ahmed Sinan	4426	
8th (2017)		Ahmed Sinan	Vaashey Mashaa Ekee	
8th (2017)		Ahmed Sinan	Hulhudhaan	
8th (2017)		Ali Riyaz	E Re'ah Fahu	
8th (2017)		Ahmed Sinan	Mikoe Bappa Baey Baey	
9th (2019)	Not Awarded			

== See also ==
- Gaumee Film Awards
