= Gaumee Film Award for Best Editing =

Gaumee Film Award

- Awarded for: Best Editing
- Country: Maldives
- Presented by: National Centre for the Arts

The Gaumee Film Award for Best Editing is given as part of the Gaumee Film Awards for Maldivian Films.

The award was first given in 1995. Here is a list of the award winners and the nominees of the respective award ceremonies.

== Winners and nominees ==
Year	Photos of winners	Editor	Film	Ref(s)
1st (1995)		Mohamed Niyaz	Dheriyaa	
1st (1995)		No Other Nominee		
2nd (1997)	Not Available			
3rd (2007)		Mohamed Niyaz	Amaanaaiy	
3rd (2007)		No Other Nominee		
4th (2007)		Sadha Ahmed	Kalaayaanulaa	
4th (2007)		No Other Nominee		
5th (2008)		Ali Musthafa	Vaaloabi Engeynama	
5th (2008)		No Other Nominee		
6th (2015)		Ali Shifau	Happy Birthday	
6th (2015)		Abdulla Muaz	Niuma	
6th (2015)		Yoosuf Shafeeu	Veeraana	
6th (2015)		Ahmed Nimal	Zalzalaa En'buri Aun	
6th (2015)		Fathimath Nahula	Yoosuf	
7th (2016)		Ali Musthafa	Sazaa	
7th (2016)		Ahmed Asim	Loodhifa	
7th (2016)		Ravee Farooq	Ingili	
7th (2016)		Mohamed Aksham, Abdul Faththaah	Love Story	
7th (2016)		Ali Shifau	Fathis Handhuvaruge Feshun 3D	
8th (2017)		Ali Shifau	Vaashey Mashaa Ekee	
8th (2017)		Ahmed Shakir, Ravee Farooq, Ahmed Sinan, Mohamed Faisal	Hulhudhaan	
8th (2017)		Ali Seezan, Ahmed Giyas	Ahsham	
8th (2017)		Ali Shifau	Emme Fahu Vindha Jehendhen	
8th (2017)		Ravee Farooq	Mikoe Bappa Baey Baey	
9th (2019)		Yoosuf Shafeeu	Dhevansoora	
9th (2019)		Ahmed Sajid	Ill Noise	
9th (2019)		Ahmed Sajid	Hahdhu	
9th (2019)		Ravee Farooq	Vishka	
9th (2019)		Ahmed Asim	Malikaa	

== See also ==
- Gaumee Film Awards
