= Vaashey Mashaa Ekee =

- Official film poster
- Directed by: Ali Shifau
- Written by: Mahdi Ahmed
- Screenplay by: Mahdi Ahmed
- Produced by: Mohamed Ali; Aishath Fuad Thaufeeq
- Starring: Mohamed Jumayyil; Mariyam Majudha; Mohamed Faisal; Ali Shazleem; Aminath Noora
- Cinematography: Ali Shifau; Ahmed Sinan
- Edited by: Ali Shifau
- Music by: Mohamed Ikram
- Production company: Dark Rain Entertainment
- Release date: 5 April 2016
- Country: Maldives
- Language: Dhivehi

Vaashey Mashaa Ekee (transl. stay with me) is a 2016 Maldivian romantic comedy film directed by Ali Shifau. Co-produced by Mohamed Ali and Aishath Fuad Thaufeeq under Dark Rain Entertainment, the film stars Mohamed Jumayyil and Mariyam Majudha in pivotal roles. The shooting of the film took place in Malé, Hulhumalé and Villimalé.

== Plot ==
The story revolves around 2 individuals with different ideologies. Ziyadh wants to enjoy his life and don't want any kids. Nathasha on the other hand, is a hardworking teacher who loves kids and wants have one too.

Problem arise when Natha become pregnant. Ziya's behaviour towards Natha changed after her pregnancy. Natha decided to separate from Ziya due to his lack of co-operation, and lives with her friend Ina. Ziya realised the importance of Natha and his baby and wants Natha back in him, but Natha doesn't wanna go back to him. Ziya does everything Natha expected him to do so he can win her back. Natha accept Ziya's apology. After getting along Natha gets labour pain and gets admitted. During the delivery Ziya was with Natha in the Labour ward despite it not being allowed. Ziya happily carries his and realise the importance of a child in marriage.

Four years later, Natha and Ziya lives a happy life with their son. Natha reveals that she is pregnant again to which Ziya reacts in a negative way.

== Cast ==
- Mohamed Jumayyil as Ziyaadh aka Ziya, Natha's husband
- Mariyam Majudha as Nathasha aka Natha, Ziya's wife
- Mohamed Faisal as Thobe, Ziya's friend & Inaya's brother
- Ali Shazleem as Adhuham, Ina's husband
- Aminath Noora as Inaya aka Ina, Adhuham's wife & Thobe's sister
- Ahmed Sunie as Dr. Asif, Natha's gynecologist & Suzanne's husband
- Adam Rizwee as Rex, Ziya & Thobe's friend
- Ahmed Shakir as Zaroon, Fubu's brother
- Abdullah Shafiu Ibrahim as Fubu, Natha's ex-boyfriend & Zaroon's brother
- Maryz Gomez as Maryz, Thobe's girlfriend
- Maria Teresa Pagano as Suzanne, Maryz friend & Dr. Asif's wife
- Mohamed Naail as Kaif, Ina & Adhuham's eldest son
- Ahmed Naavi as Zaul, Ina & Adhuham's youngest son
- Aishath Gulfa as Dr. Aisha, Natha's radiologist
- Hassan Rizvee as Office Assistant
- Hamdhan Farooq as Male Nurse

== Soundtrack ==
The soundtrack album of the film consists of six original tracks. The music of the album was composed by Mohamed Ikram.

No.	Title	Singer(s)	Length
1.	"Beywafaa"	Scores Of Flair	4:02
2.	"Yaaraa Hinithun Veemaa"	Mira Mohamed Majid, Yaameen Rasheed	3:44
3.	"Thibaa"	Fathuhulla Abdul Fahthah	4:27
4.	"Dhuruvaan Jehunas"	Scores Of Flair	6:03
5.	"Astha Astha"	Equatic Vibe	3:25
6.	"Vaashey Mashaa Ekee"	Fathuhulla Abdul Fahthah, Khadheeja Mohamed	3:03
7.	"Vaashey Mashaa Ekee (Acoustic)"	Fathuhulla Abdul Fahthah	3:29
8.	"Kinboo"	Fathuhulla Abdul Fahthah	3:18
9.	"Ey Hithaa"	Luba	5:03
10.	"Noon Noon Nudhey"	Detune Band	3:00
Total length:			34:49

== Release ==
Initially, Vaashey Mashaa Ekee was slated to release during the month of February in 2016. However, on 9 November 2015, it was revealed that the release date of the film was postponed to 4 May 2016. After confirming the news on their official Facebook page, the film was confirmed to be releasing a month earlier. The film was premiered at Olympus on 5 April 2016. The film was premiered at different islands afterwards. It was screened at Addu City on 14 April 2016.

== Accolades ==
Award	Category	Recipient(s) and nominee(s)	Result	Ref(s)
8th Gaumee Film Awards	Best film	Vaashey Mashaa Ekee	Won	
8th Gaumee Film Awards	Best Director	Ali Shifau	Won	
8th Gaumee Film Awards	Best Actor	Mohamed Jumayyil	Won	
8th Gaumee Film Awards	Best Actress	Mariyam Majudha	Won	
8th Gaumee Film Awards	Best Supporting Actor	Mohamed Faisal	Nominated	
8th Gaumee Film Awards	Best Supporting Actor	Adam Rizwee	Nominated	
8th Gaumee Film Awards	Best Male Debut	Abdullah Shafiu Ibrahim	Nominated	
8th Gaumee Film Awards	Best Female Debut	Aminath Noora	Nominated	
8th Gaumee Film Awards	Original Song	Detune Band for "Noon Noon Nudhey"	Nominated	
8th Gaumee Film Awards	Best Lyricist	Ahmed Furugan for "Noon Noon Nudhey"	Nominated	
8th Gaumee Film Awards	Male Playback Singer	Ahmed Furugan for "Noon Noon Nudhey"	Nominated	
8th Gaumee Film Awards	Best Female Playback Singer	Khadheeja Mohamed for "Vaashey Mashaa Ekee"	Nominated	
8th Gaumee Film Awards	Best Editing	Ali Shifau	Won	
8th Gaumee Film Awards	Best Cinematography	Ali Shifau and Ahmed Sinan	Nominated	
8th Gaumee Film Awards	Best Screenplay	Mahdi Ahmed	Nominated	
8th Gaumee Film Awards	Best Background Music	Mohamed Ikram	Nominated	
8th Gaumee Film Awards	Best Sound Editing	Ali Shifau and Mohamed Ikram	Nominated	
8th Gaumee Film Awards	Best Sound Mixing	Mohamed Ikram	Won	
8th Gaumee Film Awards	Best Art Direction	Mohamed Ali and Ali Shifau	Won	
8th Gaumee Film Awards	Best Visual Effects	Ahmed Sinan	Nominated	
8th Gaumee Film Awards	Best Costume Design	Mariyam Majudha	Won	
8th Gaumee Film Awards	Best Makeup	Mariyam Majudha	Nominated	
