= 8th Gaumee Film Awards =

- Date: 20 December 2017

Highlights
- Best Film: Vaashey Mashaa Ekee
- Most awards: Vaashey Mashaa Ekee (9)
- Most nominations: Vaashey Mashaa Ekee (21)

8th Gaumee Film Awards ceremony, honored the best Maldivian films released between 2014 and 2016. The ceremony was held on 20 December 2017.

== Winners and nominees ==
=== Main awards ===
Nominees were announced on 12 December 2017.

Best Film	Best Director
Vaashey Mashaa Ekee; Hulhudhaan; Ahsham; Emme Fahu Vindha Jehendhen; Mikoe Bappa Baey Baey	Ali Shifau – Vaashey Mashaa Ekee; Aishath Fuad Thaufeeq – Hulhudhaan; Ali Seezan – Ahsham; Ali Shifau – Emme Fahu Vindha Jehendhen; Ravee Farooq – Mikoe Bappa Baey Baey
Best Actor	Best Actress
Mohamed Jumayyil – Vaashey Mashaa Ekee; Roanu Hassan Manik – Hulhudhaan; Ali Seezan – Ahsham; Ibrahim Jihad – 4426; Mohamed Jumayyil – Emme Fahu Vindha Jehendhen	Mariyam Majudha – Vaashey Mashaa Ekee; Mariyam Majudha – Hulhudhaan; Niuma Mohamed – Aadheys; Mariyam Majudha – Emme Fahu Vindha Jehendhen; Aishath Rishmy – Mikoe Bappa Baey Baey
Best Supporting Actor	Best Supporting Actress
Ahmed Saeed – Ahsham; Mohamed Faisal – Vaashey Mashaa Ekee; Adam Rizwee – Vaashey Mashaa Ekee; Ravee Farooq – Hulhudhaan; Ismail Rasheed – Aniyaa	Zeenath Abbas – Ahsham; Niuma Mohamed – Aniyaa; Zeenath Abbas – Vee Beyvafa; Amira Ismail – Aadheys; Fathimath Azifa – Aadheys
Best Male Debut	Best Female Debut
Mohamed Jumayyil – Aniyaa; Abdullah Shafiu Ibrahim – Vaashey Mashaa Ekee; Ismail Jumaih – Neyngi Yaaru Vakivee; Ali Azim – Aadheys; Ibrahim Abdulla Naseer – Aadheys	Mariyam Majudha – Hulhudhaan; Aminath Noora – Vaashey Mashaa Ekee; Maleeha Waheed – Neyngi Yaaru Vakivee
Original Song	Best Lyricist
Mohamed Ikram - "Forever in Love" - 24 Gadi Iru; Detune Band - "Noon Noon Nudhey" - Vaashey Mashaa Ekee; Ibrahim Zaid Ali - "Vaa Loabi Dhulun" - Vafaatheri Kehiveriya; Ibrahim Zaid Ali - "Gandhee Huvaa" - Ahsham; Shammoon Mohamed - "Gellifa" - Emme Fahu Vindha Jehendhen	Zero Degree - "Thakurah Baheh" - Hulhudhaan; Ahmed Furugan - "Noon Noon Nudhey" - Vaashey Mashaa Ekee; Mohamed Abdul Ghanee - "Aadheys" - Aadheys; Adam Haleem Adnan - "Ummeedh" - Vafaatheri Kehiveriya; Mohamed Abdul Ghanee - "Gandhee Huvaa" - Ahsham
Best Playback Singer – Male	Best Playback Singer – Female
Ahmed Nashid - "Thakurah Baheh" - Hulhudhaan; Ahmed Furugan - "Noon Noon Nudhey" - Vaashey Mashaa Ekee; Mohamed Abdul Ghanee - "Ummeedh" - Vafaatheri Kehiveriya; Ahmed Ibrahim - "Gandhee Huvaa" - Ahsham; Shammoon Mohamed - "Gellifa" - Emme Fahu Vindha Jehendhen	Mariyam Unoosha - "Forever in Love" - 24 Gadi Iru; Khadheeja Mohamed - "Vaashey Mashaa Ekee" - Vaashey Mashaa Ekee; Shifa Thaufeeq - "Hiy Meygaa Mibunanee" - Aniyaa; Mariyam Ashfa - "Vaa Loabi Dhulun" - Vafaatheri Kehiveriya; Mira Mohamed Majid - "Gandhee Huvaa" - Ahsham

=== Technical awards ===
Best Editing	Best Cinematography
Ali Shifau – Vaashey Mashaa Ekee; Ahmed Shakir, Ravee Farooq, Ahmed Sinan, Mohamed Faisal – Hulhudhaan; Ali Seezan, Ahmed Giyas – Ahsham; Ali Shifau – Emme Fahu Vindha Jehendhen; Ravee Farooq – Mikoe Bappa Baey Baey	Shivaz Abdulla – Ahsham; Ali Shifau, Ahmed Sinan – Vaashey Mashaa Ekee; Ali Shifau, Ahmed Sinan – Hulhudhaan; Ali Shifau, Ahmed Sinan – Emme Fahu Vindha Jehendhen; Ali Shifau – Mikoe Bappa Baey Baey
Best Screenplay	Best Background Music
Aishath Fuad Thaufeeg – Hulhudhaan; Mahdi Ahmed – Vaashey Mashaa Ekee; Ahmed Nimal – Aniyaa; Mahdi Ahmed, Ahmed Zareer – Ahsham; Mahdi Ahmed – Mikoe Bappa Baey Baey	Mohamed Ikram – Emme Fahu Vindha Jehendhen; Mohamed Ikram – Vaashey Mashaa Ekee; Ayyuman Shareef – Aniyaa; Ibrahim Nifar – Vafaatheri Kehiveriya; Mohamed Ikram – Insaana
Best Sound Editing	Best Sound Mixing
Mohamed Ikram – Mikoe Bappa Baey Baey; Ali Shifau – Vaashey Mashaa Ekee; Haisham Shafeeq – Hulhudhaan; Ali Seezan, Ibrahim Wisan – Insaana; Mohamed Ikram, Ali Shifau – Emme Fahu Vindha Jehendhen	Mohamed Ikram – Vaashey Mashaa Ekee; Ayyuman Shareef, Ahmed Nimal – Aniyaa; Mohamed Ikram – 24 Gadi Iru; Mohamed Ikram – Emme Fahu Vindha Jehendhen; Mohamed Ikram – Mikoe Bappa Baey Baey
Best Art Direction	Best Visual Effects
Mohamed Ali, Ali Shifau – Vaashey Mashaa Ekee; Aishath Fuad Thaufeeq, Mohamed Ali – Hulhudhaan; Ali Seezan, Ibrahim Wisan – Ahsham; Mohamed Ali, Ali Shifau – Emme Fahu Vindha Jehendhen; Mohamed Ali, Ravee Farooq, Ali Shifau – Mikoe Bappa Baey Baey	Ahmed Sinan – 4426; Ahmed Sinan – Vaashey Mashaa Ekee; Ahmed Sinan – Hulhudhaan; Ali Riyaz – E Re'ah Fahu; Ahmed Sinan – Mikoe Bappa Baey Baey
Best Costume Design	Best Makeup
Mariyam Majudha – Vaashey Mashaa Ekee; Aishath Fuad Thaufeeq, Mariyam Majudha – Hulhudhaan; Ali Seezan– Ahsham; Razeena Thaufeeq, Fathimath Nahula – 4426; Mariyam Majudha – Emme Fahu Vindha Jehendhen	Mariyam Majudha – Hulhudhaan; Mariyam Majudha – Vaashey Mashaa Ekee; Zeenath Abbas– Ahsham; Ismail Jumaih, Ahmed Fayaz – 4426; Mariyam Majudha – Emme Fahu Vindha Jehendhen

=== Short film ===
Best Film	Best Director
Voodoo; Farihibe 4; Kashfu	Ali Shifau – Voodoo; Abdulla Muaz – Farihibe 4; Ali Shifau – Kashfu
Best Actor	Best Actress
Ibrahim Jihad – Kashfu; Mohamed Abdulla – Farihibe 4; Abdulla Hussain – Voodoo	Fathimath Azifa – Farihibe 4; Niuma Mohamed – 13 Ah Visnaa Dhehaas; Fathimath Fareela – Kashfu
Best Supporting Actor	Best Supporting Actress
Ahmed Nashith – Voodoo; Ismail Rasheed – Farihibe 4; Ismail Rasheed – Farihibe 3; Ismail Rasheed – Siyaasee Vaccine; Ahmed Saeed – Kashfu	Fathimath Azifa – 13 Ah Visnaa Dhehaas; Aishath Rishmy – Farihibe 4; Aishath Rishmy – Farihibe 3; Fathimath Azifa – Farihibe 3; Zeenath Abbas – Siyaasee Koalhun
Best Editing	Best Cinematography
Ali Shifau – Voodoo; Abdulla Muaz – Farihibe 4; Abdulla Muaz – Farihibe 3; Ali Shifau, Ahmed Shakir – Kashfu	Ali Shifau – Voodoo; Ibrahim Wisan – Farihibe 4; Hassan Haleem – Farihibe 3; Shivaz Abdulla – 13 Ah Visnaa Dhehaas; Ali Shifau – Kashfu

=== Special awards ===
Lifetime Achievement Award
- Mohamed Musthafa Hussain
  Aslam Rasheed

== See also ==
- Gaumee Film Awards
