= Gaumee Film Award for Best Female Debut =

Gaumee Film Award

- Awarded for: Best Female Debut
- Country: Maldives
- Presented by: National Centre for the Arts

The Gaumee Film Award for Best Female Debut is given as part of the Gaumee Film Awards for Maldivian Films.

The award was first given in 2017. Here is a list of the award winners and the nominees of the respective award ceremonies.

== Winners and nominees ==
Year	Photos of winners	Actor	Film	Ref(s)
1st (1995)	Not Awarded			
2nd (1997)	Not Awarded			
3rd (2007)	Not Awarded			
4th (2007)	Not Awarded			
5th (2008)	Not Awarded			
6th (2015)	Not Awarded			
7th (2016)	Not Awarded			
8th (2017)		Mariyam Majudha	Hulhudhaan	
8th (2017)		Aminath Noora	Vaashey Mashaa Ekee	
8th (2017)		Maleeha Waheed	Neyngi Yaaru Vakivee	
9th (2019)	Not Awarded			

== See also ==
- Gaumee Film Awards
