= Gaumee Film Award for Best Cinematography =

- Awarded for: Best Cinematography
- Country: Maldives
- Presented by: National Centre for the Arts

The Gaumee Film Award for Best Cinematography is given as part of the Gaumee Film Awards for Maldivian Films.

The award was first given in 1995. Here is a list of the award winners and the nominees of the respective award ceremonies.

== Winners and nominees ==
Year	Photos of winners	Cinematographer	Film	Ref(s)
1st (1995)		Hassan Haleem, Mohamed Manik	Dheriyaa	
1st (1995)		No Other Nominee		
2nd (1997)	Not Available			
3rd (2007)		Hassan Haleem, Mohamed Manik	Amaanaaiy	
3rd (2007)		No Other Nominee		
4th (2007)		Ibrahim Moosa, Hassan Haleem	Eynaa	
4th (2007)		No Other Nominee		
5th (2008)		Moomin Fuad, Ali Shifau	Heylaa	
5th (2008)		No Other Nominee		
6th (2015)		Ibrahim Moosa	Yoosuf	
6th (2015)		Ibrahim Moosa	Niuma	
6th (2015)		Ibrahim Moosa	Zalzalaa En'buri Aun	
6th (2015)		Hassan Haleem	Fanaa	
6th (2015)		Ali Shifau	Dhin Veynuge Hithaamaigaa	
7th (2016)		Hussain Munawwar	Sazaa	
7th (2016)		Hussain Munawwar	Loodhifa	
7th (2016)		Hussain Munawwar	Ingili	
7th (2016)		Ibrahim Wisan	Love Story	
7th (2016)		Ibrahim Wisan	Fathis Handhuvaruge Feshun 3D	
8th (2017)		Shivaz Abdulla	Ahsham	
8th (2017)		Ali Shifau, Ahmed Sinan	Vaashey Mashaa Ekee	
8th (2017)		Ali Shifau, Ahmed Sinan	Hulhudhaan	
8th (2017)		Ali Shifau, Ahmed Sinan	Emme Fahu Vindha Jehendhen	
8th (2017)		Ali Shifau	Mikoe Bappa Baey Baey	
9th (2019)		Ahmed Shamin Nizam	Vishka	
9th (2019)		Hussain Adnan, Mohamed Ishan	Bos	
9th (2019)		Vishal Amir Ahmed	Ill Noise	
9th (2019)		Ibrahim Wisan	Hahdhu	
9th (2019)		Ibrahim Moosa	Dhevansoora	

== See also ==
- Gaumee Film Awards
