= Fathis Handhuvaruge Feshun 3D =

Fathis Handhuvaruge Feshun
- Official film poster
- Directed by: Ali Shifau
- Written by: Ibrahim Waheed
- Screenplay by: Ibrahim Waheed
- Produced by: Mohamed Ali
- Starring: Yoosuf Shafeeu; Fathimath Fareela; Ahmed Nimal
- Cinematography: Ibrahim Wisan
- Edited by: Ali Shifau
- Music by: Ayyuman Shareef
- Production company: Dark Rain Entertainment
- Release date: April 5, 2013
- Running time: 121 minutes
- Country: Maldives
- Language: Dhivehi
- Budget: MVR 900,000

Fathis Handhuvaruge Feshun 3D is a 2013 Maldivian romantic horror film directed by Ali Shifau. Produced by Mohamed Ali under Dark Rain Entertainment, the film stars Yoosuf Shafeeu, Fathimath Fareela and Ahmed Nimal in pivotal roles. The film was released on 4 April 2013. It serves as a prequel to Fathis Handhuvaru (1997) which starred Reeko Moosa Manik and Niuma Mohamed in lead roles. It also celebrates the first 3D Maldivian film released in the cinema.

== Cast ==
- Yoosuf Shafeeu as Jinaa
- Fathimath Fareela as Niha
- Mohamed Faisal as Adam Saleem
- Ahmed Nimal as Naseem
- Ahmed Saeed as Shareef
- Mohamed Faisal as Zuhairu
- Hamid Ali as Hassana
- Aminath Ameela as Shafeega
- Hawwa Zahira as Latheefa
- Mariyam Haleem as Bodudaitha
- Zainab Mansoor as Naasiha
- Shahid Mohamed as Shahid
- Mohamed Ibrahim as Mechanic
- Ahmed Faiz as Waiter
- Ali Zaidan as Boy running
- Abdulla Ajuwad as Boy running
- Abdullah Hussain Abusy as Jina
- Ibrahim Wisan as Badheeu (Special appearance)
- Rafiyath Rameeza as Zoona (Special appearance)

== Development ==
Fathis Handhuvaruge Feshun 3D was based on a story published by Ibrahim Waheed on an online news platform Haveeru Daily. Titled Jinaa: Fathis Handhuvaruge Feshun (2009), the story serves as prequel to the story Fathishandhuvaru (1996) written by Waheed which was later adapted to a film by same name in 1997. The film was marketed as being the first 3D release for a Maldivian film and the first release derived from spin-off. It was also hyped as the most awaited release of the year. It was made on a budget of MVR 1,300,000.

== Release and response ==
Fathis Handhuvaruge Feshun 3D was initially slated to release on 28 September 2012, however, shifted for an early 2013 release due to the unavailability of cinema. The dates further fluctuated before being finalised for 5 April 2013 release, due to the ongoing upgrading work of cinema.

Upon release the film received generally negative reviews from critics. Ahmed Nadheem from Haveeru Daily criticised the screenplay for the lack of "amusement" and the "abrupt rush" in story-line with "flaws in the script". He further deprecate the acting of the cast; "Not only Yoosuf Shafeeu, everyone in the cast gave a forgettable performance barring Ahmed Nimal. He concluded the review praising the efforts put into visual effect and addressing the "dislike of the film in comparison to Fathis Handhuvaru". Fathimath Zaina from Vnews echoed similar sentiments and mentioned: "It brings a good opportunity for Maldivians to experience a Dhivehi film in 3D, however it is a disappointment as a film overall. It does not bring justice to the genre it represent and so does the same to the story it's based on".

Ibrahim Waheed, who originally penned the story, disapproved the film; "The story proceeded with no pace, the film moved unnoticed, bass sound was so high you do not hear the dialogues well, direction extremely weak".

== Soundtrack ==
Track listing
| No. | Title | Lyrics | Music | Singer(s) | Length |
|---|---|---|---|---|---|
| 1. | "Zuvaanaa Thiyanan Hithugaa" | Shifa Thaufeeq | Ayyuman Shareef | Shifa Thaufeeq | 4:38 |
| 2. | "Fathis Handhuvaru Hekivedheyney" | Ismail Mubarik | Ayyuman Shareef | Mohamed Abdul Ghanee | 4:57 |
| 3. | "Edhemey Kalaayah Inthihaa" (Male Version) | Shifa Thaufeeq | Ayyuman Shareef | Mohamed Abdul Ghanee | 4:13 |
| 4. | "Kuramey Kalaayah Inthizaaru" | Shifa Thaufeeq | Ayyuman Shareef | Mohamed Abdul Ghanee | 5:26 |
| 5. | "Edhemey Kalaayah Inthihaa" (Female Version) | Shifa Thaufeeq | Ayyuman Shareef | Shifa Thaufeeq | 4:56 |
| 6. | "Vamey Fun Khiyaalu Thakugaa" | Ismail Mubarik | Ayyuman Shareef | Mohamed Abdul Ghanee, Shifa Thaufeeq | 4:06 |

== Accolades ==
| Award | Category | Recipients | Result | Ref. |
|---|---|---|---|---|
| 3rd Maldives Film Awards | Best Actor | Yoosuf Shafeeu | Nominated | |
| 3rd Maldives Film Awards | Best Actress | Fathimath Fareela | Nominated | |
| 3rd Maldives Film Awards | Best Male Playback Singer | Mohamed Abdul Ghanee for "Vamey Fun Khiyaalu" | Won | |
| 3rd Maldives Film Awards | Best Male Playback Singer | Mohamed Abdul Ghanee for "Fathis Handhuvaruge Feshun" | Nominated | |
| 3rd Maldives Film Awards | Best Female Playback Singer | Shifa Thaufeeq for "Vamey Fun Khiyaalu" | Nominated | |
| 3rd Maldives Film Awards | Best Original Song | Ayyuman Shareef for "Vamey Fun Khiyaalu" | Won | |
| 3rd Maldives Film Awards | Best Makeup | Hassan Adam | Won | |
| 3rd Maldives Film Awards | Best Choreography | Fathimath Fareela | Nominated | |
| 3rd Maldives Film Awards | Best Art Direction | Mohamed Ali, Ali Shifau | Nominated | |
| 3rd Maldives Film Awards | Best Lyrics | Ismail Mubarak for "Fathis Handhuvaruge Feshun" | Won | |
| 3rd Maldives Film Awards | Best Lyrics | Shifa Thaufeeq for "Zuvaanaa Thiyanan Hithugaa" | Nominated | |
| 3rd Maldives Film Awards | Best Female Debut | Hawwa Zahira | Nominated | |
| 3rd Maldives Film Awards | Best Sound Editing | Ali Shifau | Nominated | |
| 3rd Maldives Film Awards | Best Sound Mixing | Ali Shifau | Nominated | |
| 3rd Maldives Film Awards | Best Editing | Ali Shifau | Nominated | |
| 3rd Maldives Film Awards | Best Visual Effects | Ahmed Sinan | Won | |
| 7th Gaumee Film Awards | Best film | Fathis Handhuvaruge Feshun 3D | Nominated | |
| 7th Gaumee Film Awards | Best Director | Ali Shifau | Nominated | |
| 7th Gaumee Film Awards | Best Actor | Yoosuf Shafeeu | Nominated | |
| 7th Gaumee Film Awards | Best Actress | Fathimath Fareela | Nominated | |
| 7th Gaumee Film Awards | Best Original Song | Shifa Thaufeeq for "Zuvaanaa Thiyanan" | Nominated | |
| 7th Gaumee Film Awards | Best Female Playback Singer | Shifa Thaufeeq for "Zuvaanaa Thiyanan" | Won | |
| 7th Gaumee Film Awards | Best Female Playback Singer | Shifa Thaufeeq for "Vamey Fun Khiyaalu" | Nominated | |
| 7th Gaumee Film Awards | Best Editing | Ali Shifau | Nominated | |
| 7th Gaumee Film Awards | Best Cinematography | Ibrahim Wisan | Nominated | |
| 7th Gaumee Film Awards | Best Screenplay | Ibrahim Waheed | Nominated | |
| 7th Gaumee Film Awards | Best Sound Mixing | Ali Shifau | Nominated | |
| 7th Gaumee Film Awards | Best Sound Editing | Ali Shifau | Nominated | |
| 7th Gaumee Film Awards | Best Makeup | Hassan Adam | Won | |
| 7th Gaumee Film Awards | Best Visual Effects | Ahmed Sinan | Won | |
