= Ismail Jumaih =

Maldivian performer

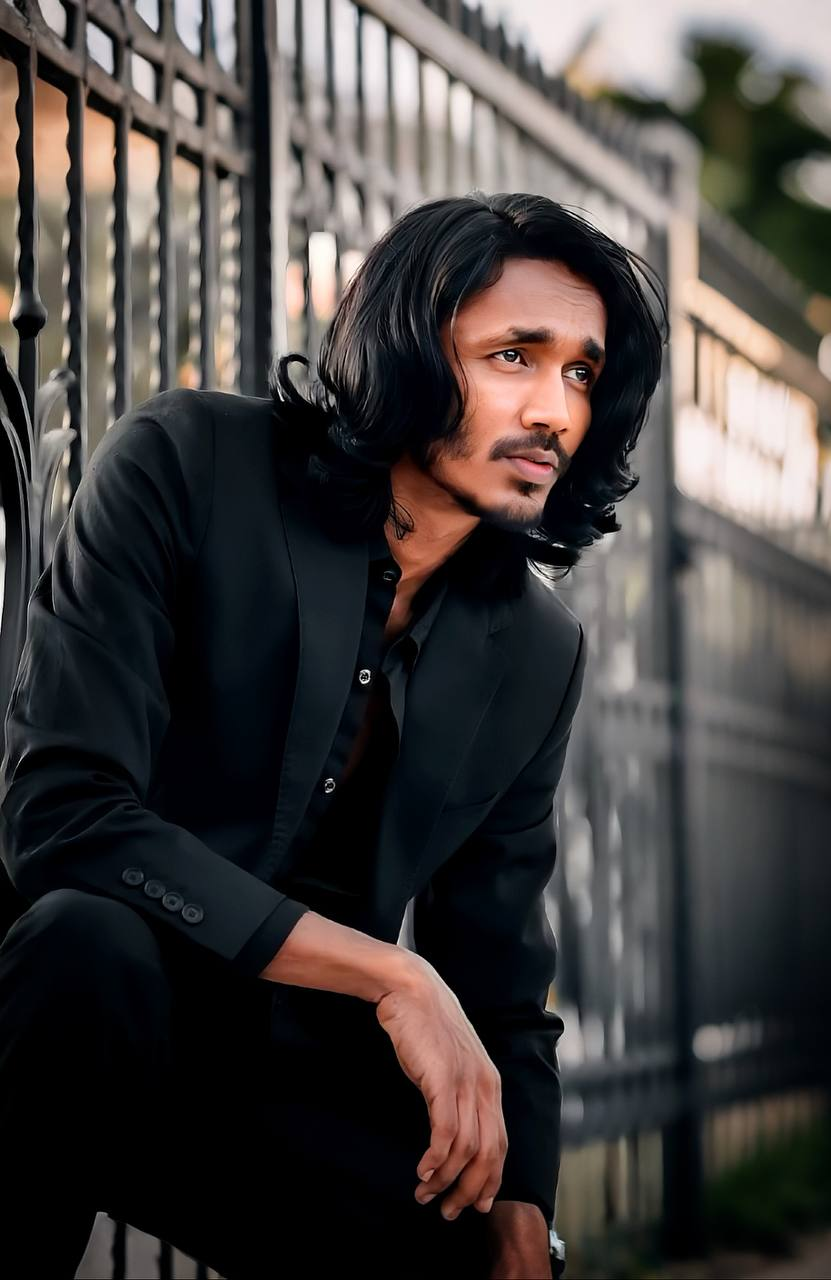
- Jumaih in a General Shoot, 2023
- Born: 12 April 1991 (age 35); Malé
- Occupations: Actor, Choreographer, Makeup Artist
- Years active: 2016–present
- Spouse: Mariyam Azza (divorced)
- Children: Mohamed Eithan Jumaih

Ismail Jumaih is a Maldivian actor, choreographer and makeup artist.

== Career ==
In 2016, Jumaih made his film debut in Hussain Munawwar's Neyngi Yaaru Vakivee alongside Aminath Rishfa and Ahmed Azmeel. Critics gave the film bad reviews and considered his performance as Sham, to be "boring" while criticising the character development. However, Ahmed Jaishan of Vaguthu, found Jumaih's acting to be "natural and impressive" considering his debut role and picked him as the "biggest highlight" from the "disappointing" film. Despite the negative reviews, the film did average business at the end of its run. Jumaih's other release of the year came with Fathimath Nahula's horror film 4426, where he portrayed the role of Hanim, an aggressive member of the friends who get trapped in a haunted house. Upon release, the film received mostly positive reviews from critics. Ahmed Nadheem of Avas labelled the film as a "masterpiece" and mentioned Jumaih to be the "surprising element" of the film. Complimenting the improvements he showed from Neyngi Yaaru Vakivee, Nadheem picked his role as the second best performance of the film; "With compliments to Nahula for her character building, Jumaih was deep in the character of Hanim, portraying the role to its fullest". With twenty-five back-to-back housefull shows being screened, 4426 was declared as the highest grossing Maldive film of the year. At the 8th Gaumee Film Awards Jumaih received a nomination for Best Male Debut award for his performance in Neyngi Yaaru Vakivee with another nomination for Best Makeup in 4426.

== Filmography ==
=== Feature film ===
Year	Title	Role	Notes	Ref(s)
2016	Neyngi Yaaru Vakivee	Sham	Nominated—Gaumee Film Award for Best Male Debut	
2016	4426	Hanim		
2019	Goh Raalhu	Hambe		
2019	Maamui	Aboobakuru Rushdy		
2025	Alvadhaau	Maaish		
TBA	Balhindhu †		Post-production	

=== Television ===
Year	Title	Role	Notes	Ref(s)
2019	Ehenas	Fayaz	Voice-over; Episode: "Identity"	
2019	Yes Sir	Abdulla Muaz	Main role; 10 episodes	
2022	Dark Rain Chronicles	Nadey	Main role in the segment "Surprise"	
2023–2024	Yaaraa	Zein Malik	Main role; 46 episodes	
2025	Chaalaakee			
2026	Ekaniveri Hithakun...	Hamdhan	Main role	

=== Short film ===
Year	Title	Role	Notes	Ref(s)
2020	KKB: Kuda Kuda Baaru	Ali		
2021	Gulhun	Himself	Special appearance	

== Accolades ==
Year	Award	Category	Nominated work	Result	Ref(s)
2015	6th Gaumee Film Awards	Best Choreography	Fanaa - "Yaaru Kairi"	Nominated	
2017	8th Gaumee Film Awards	Best Male Debut	Neyngi Yaaru Vakivee	Nominated	
2017	8th Gaumee Film Awards	Best Makeup	4426 (Shared with Ahmed Fayaz)	Nominated	
2025	1st MSPA Film Awards	Best Choreography	Maamui	Nominated	
2025	1st MSPA Film Awards	Best Makeup – Special Effects	Goh Raalhu	Won	
2025	1st MSPA Film Awards	Best Costume Designer	Maamui (Shared with Hussain Hazim)	Nominated	
