= 4426 =

- Official film poster
- Directed by: Fathimath Nahula; Ahmed Sinan
- Written by: Fathimath Nahula
- Screenplay by: Fathimath Nahula
- Produced by: Hassan Sinan
- Starring: Mariyam Azza; Yoosuf Shafeeu; Ismail Jumaih; Sheela Najeeb; Mohamed Jumayyil
- Cinematography: Ahmed Sinan
- Edited by: Mohamed Faisal; Ahmed Sinan
- Music by: Mohamed Ikram
- Production company: Crystal Entertainment
- Release date: October 18, 2016
- Country: Maldives
- Language: Dhivehi

4426 is a 2016 Maldivian horror film written and directed by Fathimath Nahula and Ahmed Sinan. Produced by Sinan under Crystal Entertainment, the film stars Mariyam Azza, Yoosuf Shafeeu, Ismail Jumaih, Sheela Najeeb and Mohamed Jumayyil in pivotal roles. The film was released on 18 October 2016.

== Plot ==
"4426" follows the story of three friends who travel to a remote island in the Maldives for a vacation. Upon arriving, they encounter a mysterious woman who warns them of a cursed area on the island known as "4426".

Ignoring the woman's warnings, the trio ventures into the cursed area and soon begins to experience a series of terrifying and inexplicable events. They are plagued by nightmares, strange visions, and hear strange sounds in the darkness. They begin to unravel as they struggle to survive.

As they attempt to find a way off the island, they come face-to-face with the source of the curse - a malevolent spirit that is determined to make them pay for their trespassing. The friends must fight to survive and break the curse before it's too late.

In a shocking climax, the truth behind the curse is revealed, and the friends must make a final, desperate stand against the vengeful spirit. The film ends with a chilling reminder that some places are better left unexplored, and some curses are not meant to be broken.

== Cast ==
- Mariyam Azza as Elisha
- Mohamed Jumayyil as Suja
- Ismail Jumaih as Hanim
- Yoosuf Shafeeu as Mifu
- Sheela Najeeb as Ruby
- Ibrahim Jihad as Muju
- Mohamed Faisal as Nihad
- Ali Farooq as Alibe
- Mariyam Shahuza
- Ahmed Aman
- Maahy as Zeena
- Mariyam Haleem as Ruby's mother

== Development ==
4426 was announced on 26 February 2016. It was hyped in the media as the comeback film of Nahula after Yoosuf (2009) and for trying a different genre than her usual style. The script of the film took four months to be completed. The actors were trained in martial arts for two months before filming commenced.

== Soundtrack ==
Track listing
No.	Title	Lyrics	Music	Singer(s)	Length
1.	"Heevey Annaneehen" (Promotional song)	Mausoom Shakir	Fathhulla Shakeel Hussain	Shamrah Ahmed	6:56

== Release and reception ==
The teaser trailer of 4426 was released on 16 July 2016. Upon release, it received widespread recognition and acclaim, the teaser receiving over 200,000 views in a month, marking the first Maldivian film to reach that milestone.

The film was released on 16 October 2016. Upon release, the film received mostly positive reviews from critics. Ahmed Nadheem of Avas labelled the film as a "masterpiece" and praised Nahula's direction with Sinan's infused "technical quality" in the film. He further complimented Ibrahim Jihad's performance as an "award worthy performance". He concluded his review mentioning the team work and dedication of the film crew.

25 houseful shows of the film were screened at Olympus Cinema and it was declared as the highest grossing Maldivian film of the year.

== Accolades ==
Award	Category	Recipients	Result	Ref.
8th Gaumee Film Awards	Best Actor	Ibrahim Jihad	Nominated	
8th Gaumee Film Awards	Best Visual Effects	Ahmed Sinan	Won	
8th Gaumee Film Awards	Best Costume Design	Razeena Thaufeeq, Fathimath Nahula	Nominated	
8th Gaumee Film Awards	Best Makeup	Ismail Jumaih, Ahmed Fayaz	Nominated	
