= Ahmed Sinan =

Maldivian director, graphic designer, and editor

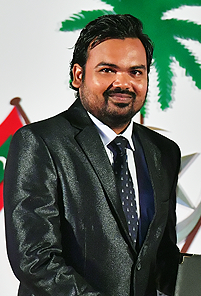
- Sinan receiving the National Award of Recognition, 2018
- Born: 19 March 1990 (age 36); R. Fainu, Maldives
- Occupations: director, Graphic designer, cinematographer, editor
- Years active: 2009-present

Ahmed Sinan (born 19 March 1990) is a Maldivian director, graphic designer, cinematographer and editor.

== Career ==
Ahmed Sinan made his career debut with Dark Rain Entertainment's production, Happy Birthday (2009) by working as the title animator and creating visual effects. He was then offered to make title animations and visual effects for films produced under several studios.

Sinan's most recognized work came in 2013, Ali Shifau-directed horror film Fathis Handhuvaruge Feshun 3D which serves as a prequel to Fathis Handhuvaru (1997) starring Reeko Moosa Manik and Niuma Mohamed in lead roles. The film was marketed as being the first 3D release for a Maldivian film and the first release derived from spin-off. Using a single laptop and working on a daily basis all by himself, the project took him two months to be completed. Upon release, the film received generally negative reviews from critics though its visual effects were particularly praised. Ahmed Nadheem from Haveeru Daily called the film a visual treat and wrote: "Fathis Handhuvaruge Feshun is a cinematic revelation in terms of graphic animations. The film has no repeat value but it deserves multiple watch solely due to its VFX". At the 7th Gaumee Film Awards Sinan earned his first Gaumee Film Award for Best Visual Effects.

In 2016, Sinan occupied the director's seat alongside Fathimath Nahula for the horror film 4426. Upon release, the film received mostly positive reviews from critics. Ahmed Nadheem of Avas labelled the film as a "masterpiece" and praised Nahula's expertise in direction with Sinan's infused "technical quality" in the film. "At a point it became obvious that Sinan was roped in for the film to uplift the standard in its technical department". Ahmed Adhushan reviewing for Mihaaru praised his work in the film. "The technical department has raised the bar in the film. From the crisp and sharp editing to its direction, Sinan needs to be applauded for his commitment". 4426 was declared as the highest-grossing Maldivian film of the year. At the 8th Gaumee Film Awards, Sinan received his second Gaumee Film Award for Best Visual Effects while being nominated in the same category for his work in the films; Mikoe Bappa Baey Baey, Hulhudhaan and Vaashey Mashaa Ekee. He also received three nominations for Best Cinematography, all shared with Ali Shifau and a Gaumee Film Award nomination for Best Editing for the film Hulhudhaan.

== Filmography ==
=== Feature film ===
Year	Title	Director	Cinematographer	Editor	Ref(s)
2014	Hulhudhaan		Yes	Yes	
2015	Emme Fahu Vindha Jehendhen		Yes		
2015	Mikoe Bappa Baey Baey		Yes		
2016	Vaashey Mashaa Ekee		Yes		
2016	4426	Yes	Yes	Yes	
2017	Mee Loaybakee		Yes		
2018	Vakin Loabin		Yes		
2019	Goh Raalhu	Yes	Yes	Yes	
2019	Maamui		Yes		
2023	Hindhukolheh		Yes		
TBA	Balhindhu	Yes		Yes	

=== Visual effect ===
- Happy Birthday (2009)
- Dhin Veynuge Hithaamaigaa (2010)
- Zaharu (2011)
- Fathis Handhuvaruge Feshun 3D (2013)
- Ingili (2013)
- Dhilakani (2013)
- Hulhudhaan (2014)
- Emme Fahu Vindha Jehendhen (2015)
- Mikoe Bappa Baey Baey (2015)
- Vaashey Mashaa Ekee (2016)
- 4426 (2016)
- Mee Loaybakee (2017)
- Vakin Loabin (2018)
- Goh Raalhu (2019)
- Maamui (2019)

== Accolades ==
Year	Award	Category	Nominated work	Result	Ref(s)
2012	2nd Maldives Film Awards	Best Visual Effects	Dhin Veynuge Hithaamaigaa	Won	
2014	3rd Maldives Film Awards	Best Visual Effects	Fathis Handhuvaruge Feshun 3D	Won	
2014	3rd Maldives Film Awards	Best Visual Effects	Dhilakani	Nominated	
2014	3rd Maldives Film Awards	Best Visual Effects	Ingili	Nominated	
2016	7th Gaumee Film Awards	Best Visual Effects	Fathis Handhuvaruge Feshun 3D	Won	
2017	8th Gaumee Film Awards	Best Editing	Hulhudhaan (Shared with Ahmed Shakir, Ravee Farooq and Mohamed Faisal)	Nominated	
2017	8th Gaumee Film Awards	Best Cinematography	Hulhudhaan (Shared with Ali Shifau)	Nominated	
2017	8th Gaumee Film Awards	Best Cinematography	Vaashey Mashaa Ekee (Shared with Ali Shifau)	Nominated	
2017	8th Gaumee Film Awards	Best Cinematography	Emme Fahu Vindha Jehendhen (Shared with Ali Shifau)	Nominated	
2017	8th Gaumee Film Awards	Best Visual Effects	4426	Won	
2017	8th Gaumee Film Awards	Best Visual Effects	Mikoe Bappa Baey Baey	Nominated	
2017	8th Gaumee Film Awards	Best Visual Effects	Hulhudhaan	Nominated	
2017	8th Gaumee Film Awards	Best Visual Effects	Vaashey Mashaa Ekee	Nominated	
2018	National Award of Recognition	Visual Arts		Won	
2025	1st MSPA Film Awards	Best Director	Goh Raalhu	Won	
2025	1st MSPA Film Awards	Best Editor	Goh Raalhu	Nominated	
2025	1st MSPA Film Awards	Best Cinematographer	Maamui (Shared with Ali Shifau)	Nominated	
2025	1st MSPA Film Awards	Best Cinematographer	November (Shared with Ali Shifau)	Nominated	
2025	1st MSPA Film Awards	Best Cinematographer	Goh Raalhu (Shared with Adam Waseem)	Nominated	
2025	1st MSPA Film Awards	Best Visual Effects	Maamui	Nominated	
2025	1st MSPA Film Awards	Best Visual Effects	Vakin Loabin	Nominated	
2025	1st MSPA Film Awards	Best Visual Effects	Goh Raalhu	Nominated	
2025	1st MSPA Film Awards	Best Sound Engineer	Goh Raalhu (Shared with Ali Shifau)	Nominated	
2025	5th Karnataka International Film Festival	Best Cinematography	November (Shared with Ali Shifau)	Won	
