= Mariyam Majudha =

Maldivian film actress (born 1988)

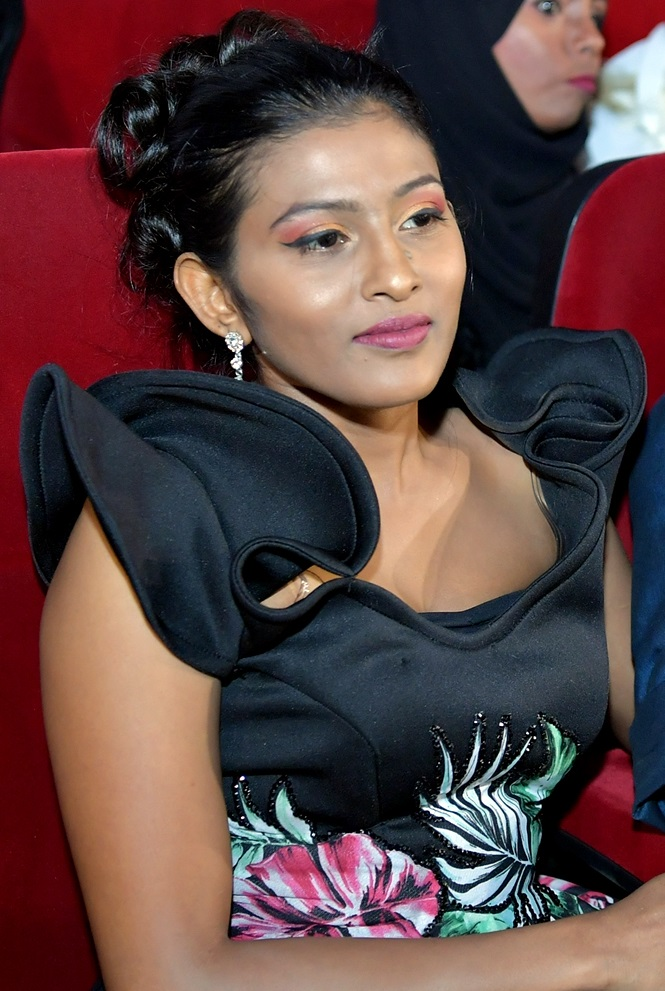
- Majduha at 9th Gaumee Film Awards ceremony, 2019
- Born: 18 March 1988 (age 38); Male', Maldives
- Occupation: Actress
- Years active: 2014–present

Mariyam Majudha (born 18 March 1988) is a Maldivian film actress.

== Career ==
Majudha made her film debut in the Aishath Fuad Thaufeeq-directed Hulhudhaan as Sama (2014) alongside Roanu Hassan Manik, which was a critical success. The film was later screened at the Venice Film Festival. Her performance as Sama, a drug addict, received a positive response from the critics. The following year, she appeared in the Ali Shifau-directed romantic film Emme Fahu Vindha Jehendhen opposite Mohamed Jumayyil, where she portrayed the role of Meera. The film, along with Majudha's acting, was critically acclaimed. In a pre-premiere review from Vaguthu, Ismail Nail praised Jumayyil and Majudha's chemistry in the film and mentioned that she delivered each expression to "absolute perfection". The film was the highest grossing Maldivian film of the year, and was a commercial success. The following year, Majudha collaborated with Fathimath Nahula for 13 episodes television drama series, Umurah Salaan (2015) which centers on a squabble family which is separated due to the greed for money and misunderstandings. The series which stars Mohamed Faisal, Aminath Rishfa, Ahmed Azmeel and Mariyam Azza in lead roles, she portrays the character Maasha, an orphan who helplessly works as a servant while being mistreated by the tenants.

For her next film, Majudha collaborated with Jumayyil and Shifau to star in the first Maldivian romantic comedy film Vaashey Mashaa Ekee (2016), where she starred as Nathasha. Her performance was positively received by the critics; Ahmed Nadheem from Avas picked her as the "best actor in the film" and acknowledged her improvement from her prior work. The film emerged as one of the highest grossing films of the year. At the 8th Gaumee Film Awards Majudha was bestowed with Best Actress for Vaashey Mashaa Ekee while her performance in Emme Fahu Vindha Jehendhen and Hulhudhaan received a further two nominations in the same category. She also received the Best Female Debut award for her performance in the latter. She received three Best Costume Design and three Best Makeup nominations for her work in Hulhudhaan, Emme Fahu Vindha Jehendhen and Vaashey Mashaa Ekee, ultimately winning Best Costume Design award for the latter and Best Makeup award for the former.

In 2018, Majudha was featured in Shifau's family drama Vakin Loabin (2018), marking her third collaboration with Jumayyil. The film tells a story of a young couple’s divorce and its impact on everyone involved. Upon release, the film met with positive response from critics—specifically praising the screenplay for toning down its melodrama and breaking from the stereotypes of its genre—and was a commercial success. In a pre-premier review from Raajje.mv, Ismail Naail Nasheed favored the character development and minimised use of melodrama in the film while praising Majudha's acting in the first and last few scenes of the movie; "the scene where she cries alone in the room before being thrown out of the house is a highlight of the film and her acting performance".

Later during the year, first Maldivian anthology film was released which featured Majudha as a drug addict in the segment directed by Ravee Farooq, titled Gaathil. Initially planned to be her debut film, the project was shot in 2013 however was digitally released six years later due to several delays in post-production.

== Media image ==
In 2018, Majudha was ranked in the seventh position from Dho?'s list of Top Ten Actresses of Maldives where writer Aishath Maaha opined that Majudha is the "most successful" actress from the current generation.

== Filmography ==
=== Feature film ===
| Year | Title | Role | Notes | Ref(s) |
|---|---|---|---|---|
| 2014 | Hulhudhaan | Sama | Gaumee Film Award for Best Female Debut; Nominated—Gaumee Film Award for Best Actress | |
| 2015 | Emme Fahu Vindha Jehendhen | Meera | Nominated—Gaumee Film Award for Best Actress | |
| 2016 | Vaashey Mashaa Ekee | Nathasha | Gaumee Film Award for Best Actress | |
| 2018 | Vakin Loabin | Nuha Zahir | Nominated—Gaumee Film Award for Best Actress | |
| 2019 | Maamui | Tanya | | |
| 2021 | Maryam | Maryam Mohamed | | |
| 2023 | Hindhukolheh | Niyaza | | |
| 2023 | November | Ameera Moosa | | |
| 2024 | Bibii | Jannath | | |
| 2025 | Alifaan | | | |
| 2025 | Alvadhaau | Anaya Zahir | | |
| 2026 | Jannath | Alma | Special Appearance | |
| 2026 | Magey Bituge Wedding | Herself | Special appearance in song "Kaiveni Medley" | |

=== Television ===
| Year | Title | Role | Notes | Ref(s) |
|---|---|---|---|---|
| 2015–2016 | Umurah Salaan | Maasha | Recurring role; 13 episodes | |
| 2019 | Hatharu Halha | Fadhu | In the segment Gaathil | |
| 2021 | Loabi Vias | Saha | Main role; 8 episodes | |
| 2021–2022 | Giritee Loabi | Naaz | Recurring role; 22 episodes | |
| 2022 | Netheemey | Soany | Recurring role; 3 episodes | |
| 2023 | Gareena | Aminath Shimla | Main role | |
| 2024 | Dark Rain Chronicles | Riyana | Main role in the segment "Dhey Handhaan" | |
| 2024–2025 | Roaleemay | Haifa | Main role; 15 episodes | |

== Accolades ==
| Year | Award | Category | Nominated work | Result | Ref(s) |
|---|---|---|---|---|---|
| 2017 | 8th Gaumee Film Awards | Best Actress | Vaashey Mashaa Ekee | Won | |
| 2017 | 8th Gaumee Film Awards | Best Actress | Hulhudhaan | Nominated | |
| 2017 | 8th Gaumee Film Awards | Best Actress | Emme Fahu Vindha Jehendhen | Nominated | |
| 2017 | 8th Gaumee Film Awards | Best Female Debut | Hulhudhaan | Won | |
| 2017 | 8th Gaumee Film Awards | Best Costume Design | Vaashey Mashaa Ekee | Won | |
| 2017 | 8th Gaumee Film Awards | Best Costume Design | Hulhudhaan (Shared with Aishath Fuad Thaufeeq) | Nominated | |
| 2017 | 8th Gaumee Film Awards | Best Costume Design | Emme Fahu Vindha Jehendhen | Nominated | |
| 2017 | 8th Gaumee Film Awards | Best Makeup | Hulhudhaan | Won | |
| 2017 | 8th Gaumee Film Awards | Best Makeup | Vaashey Mashaa Ekee | Nominated | |
| 2017 | 8th Gaumee Film Awards | Best Makeup | Emme Fahu Vindha Jehendhen | Nominated | |
| 2019 | 9th Gaumee Film Awards | Best Actress | Vakin Loabin | Nominated | |
| 2025 | 1st MSPA Film Awards | Best Lead Actor – Female | November | Nominated | |
| 2025 | 1st MSPA Film Awards | Best Supporting Actor – Female | Maamui | Nominated | |
| 2025 | 1st MSPA Film Awards | Best Supporting Actor – Female | Hindhukolheh | Nominated | |
