= Ali Shifau =

Maldivian film director, cinematographer and editor

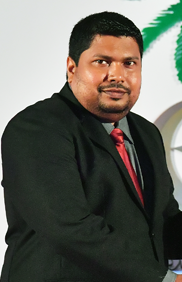
- Shifau receiving the National Award of Recognition, 2018
- Born: 19 May 1977 (age 49); Male', Maldives
- Occupations: director, cinematographer, editor
- Years active: 2006–present
- Spouse: Aishath Yaadha
- Children: 2

Ali Shifau (born 19 May 1977) is a Maldivian film director, cinematographer and editor. One of the most successful filmmakers in Maldivian Cinema, Shifau is the recipient of a number of awards, including seven Gaumee Film Awards, and four Maldives Film Awards. In 2018, the Government of Maldives honoured him with the National Award of Recognition.

== Career ==
Ali Shifau collaborated with Moomin Fuad to direct the critically appreciated crime film Heylaa (2006) featuring a cast of Ismail Rasheed, Ahmed Mauroof, Zeenath Abbas, Lufshan Shakeeb and Abdulla Muaz. The film narrates the story of a fourteen year old ambitious boy who finds himself unknowingly being involved in the smuggling of a revolver. Apart from directing the film, Shifau worked as the editor and cinematographer, marking it as the first Maldivian film to be shot in high-definition digital video. Though the film received positive reviews from critics, it was a commercial failure. Shifau opined that its commercial status was a result of casting "not very prominent" faces in the film and the "film-goers were not ready to accept the genre" at the time of its release. Ahmed Nadheem from Haveeru praised the narration and direction; "The film is embroiled in a realistic story which has sensible characters who are emotive under the helm of two great leaders serving as directors". At the 5th Gaumee Film Awards ceremony, Shifau won Best Cinematography and Best Art Direction award.

Three year later, the duo reunited for a suspense thriller Happy Birthday (2009) which narrates the story of a simple man who receives a call on his birthday informing him that his wife and son have been kidnapped, only to be returned for a ransom. The film was a commercial failure, despite the positive response from the critics. Winning five Gaumee Film Awards and twelve Maldives Film Awards, the film was also screened at the Venice Film Festival. The film earned him several accolades including his first Gaumee Film Award for Best Editing.

After being involved in two art films, Shifau paced his direction more into a commercial phase with family drama Dhin Veynuge Hithaamaigaa (2010) starring an ensemble cast including Yoosuf Shafeeu, Niuma Mohamed, Ali Seezan, Mohamed Manik and Ravee Farooq. The film showcases discrimination against the islanders, family revenge and fatherhood responsibilities. It received a positive response from critics while his direction and use of a "unique approach in presenting the concept to the romance-starved Maldivian audience" was particularly noted and was believed to be a "huge improvement" compared to the recent Maldivian films. Despite the commercial failure for his previous two films, Dhin Veynuge Hithaamaigaa was declared a commercial success. He then directed the psychological romantic thriller Zaharu (2011) starring Ali Seezan, Niuma Mohamed and Sheela Najeeb. The film centers on a married man who has a weekend affair with a woman who refuses to allow it to end and becomes obsessed with him. The film was inspired from Adrian Lyne-directed American psychological erotic thriller film Fatal Attraction (1987). Upon release it received a mixed response from critics and was declared a "flop" at the box office.

In 2013, Ali Shifau directed the horror film Fathis Handhuvaruge Feshun 3D which serves as a prequel to Fathis Handhuvaru (1997) starring Reeko Moosa Manik and Niuma Mohamed in lead roles. It was based on a story by Ibrahim Waheed, Jinaa: Fathis Handhuvaruge Feshun (2009), which itself is a prequel to the story Fathishandhuvaru (1996) written by himself which was later adapted to a film by the same name in 1997. The film was marketed as being the first 3D release for a Maldivian film and the first release derived from a spin-off. Upon release the film received generally negative reviews from critics. Ahmed Nadheem from Haveeru Daily criticized the screenplay for the lack of "amusement" and the "abrupt rush" in the story-line with "flaws in the script". He concluded the review by praising the efforts put into the visual effects and addressing the "dislike of the film in comparison to Fathis Handhuvaru". Fathimath Zaina from Vnews echoed similar sentiments and mentioned: "It brings a good opportunity for Maldivians to experience a Dhivehi film in 3D, however it is a disappointment as a film overall. It does not bring justice to the genre it represents and so does the same to the story it's based on". Despite the negative reviews, at the 7th Gaumee Film Awards he was nominated in the Best Director award category.

Shhifau's next release was the romantic film Emme Fahu Vindha Jehendhen (2015) starring Mohamed Jumayyil and Mariyam Majudha. The film was declared as the highest grossing Maldivian film of the year, and was also a critical success. The collaboration was repeated with his next release, the romantic comedy Vaashey Mashaa Ekee (2016). His work was positively mentioned in the reviews, Ahmed Nadheem from Avas called it a "masterful creation by Shifau" and wrote: "Till this point, it was perceived that Shifau's talent was vanished with Heylaa, since all the films post his debut direction, his work is average at best". The film emerged as one of the highest-grossing films of the year. The film fetched him his first Gaumee Film Award for Best Director and Best Editor.

The following year, he released another romantic comedy film Mee Loaybakee (2017) starring Mohamed Jumayyil alongside Mariyam Azza. The film emerged as one of the highest grossing Maldivian films of 2017. This was followed by a family drama Vakin Loabin (2018), marking his fourth collaboration with Mohamed Jumayyil and his third collaboration with Mariyam Majudha. The film tells a story of a young couple's divorce and its impact on everyone involved. Upon release, the film met with a positive response from critics—specifically praising the screenplay for toning down its melodrama and breaking from the stereotypes of its genre—and was a commercial success. In a pre-premier review from Raajje.mv, Ismail Naail Nasheed favored the character development and minimised use of melodrama in the film while praising Shifau's direction.

Later during the year, first Maldivian anthology film was released which credited Shifau as the director of the segment titled Foshi which focuses on the impact on a couple's life due to the home use of an abortion drug. The project was filmed in 2013 and digitally released six years later due to several delays in post-production, where the producer of the film criticizes Farooq for "failing" to complete his segment during the stipulated time period took over the post-production.

== Filmography ==
=== Feature film ===
Year	Title	Director	Editor	Camera	Ref(s)
2006	Heylaa	Yes	Yes	Yes	
2009	Happy Birthday		Yes		
2010	Dhin Veynuge Hithaamaigaa	Yes	Yes	Yes	
2011	Zaharu	Yes	Yes	Yes	
2013	Fathis Handhuvaruge Feshun 3D	Yes	Yes		
2013	Dhilakani		Yes		
2014	Hulhudhaan			Yes	
2015	Emme Fahu Vindha Jehendhen	Yes	Yes	Yes	
2015	Mikoe Bappa Baey Baey			Yes	
2016	Vaashey Mashaa Ekee	Yes	Yes	Yes	
2017	Mee Loaybakee	Yes	Yes	Yes	
2018	Vakin Loabin	Yes	Yes	Yes	
2019	Maamui	Yes	Yes	Yes	
2023	Hindhukolheh	Yes	Yes	Yes	
2023	November	Yes			
2024	Fureytha	Yes	Yes		
2024	Bibii		Yes		
2025	Alifaan	Yes	Yes		

=== Television and short films ===
Year	Title	Director	Editor	Camera	Notes	Ref(s)
2006	Dhafaraa		Yes			
2007	Reyfanaa	Yes	Yes	Yes		
2007	Badi Edhuru	Yes	Yes		Short film	
2008	Ummeedh	Yes	Yes		Short film	
2008	Inthihaa		Yes			
2008	Yaasmeen		Yes			
2008	FB!		Yes			
2008	Asarugaa	Yes	Yes			
2009	Silsilaa	Yes	Yes			
2011	Naamaan	Yes	Yes			
2012	Voodoo	Yes	Yes	Yes	Short film	
2014	Kashfu	Yes			Short film	
2019	Hatharu Halha	Yes			The segment Foshi	
2020	Dhauvathu	Yes	Yes	Yes	Short film	
2020	Anguru	Yes	Yes	Yes	Short film	
2021	Rumi á Jannat	Yes	Yes	Yes	Web series; 15 episodes	
2021	Giritee Loabi	Yes	Yes	Yes	Web series; 20 episodes	
2022–2024	Dark Rain Chronicles	Yes	Yes	Yes	Web series; 15 episodes	
2024–2025	Roaleemay	Yes		Yes	Web series; 15 episodes	
2025	Feshumaai Nimun	Yes	Yes		Web series; 10 episodes	
2025	Moosun	Yes	Yes		Web series; 10 episodes	

== Accolades ==
Year	Award	Category	Nominated work	Result	Ref(s)
2008	5th Gaumee Film Awards	Best Story	Heylaa	Won	
2008	5th Gaumee Film Awards	Best Cinematography	Heylaa	Won	
2008	5th Gaumee Film Awards	Best Art Direction	Heylaa (Shared with Ali Shifau)	Won	
2011	1st Maldives Film Awards	Best Editing	Happy Birthday	Won	
2011	1st Maldives Film Awards	Best Art Direction	Happy Birthday (Shared with Moomin Fuad)	Won	
2011	1st Maldives Film Awards	Best Sound Editing	Happy Birthday	Won	
2011	1st Maldives Film Awards	Best Sound Mixing	Happy Birthday (Shared with Moomin Fuad)	Won	
2014	3rd Maldives Film Awards	Best Editing	Fathis Handhuvaruge Feshun 3D	Nominated	
2014	3rd Maldives Film Awards	Best Art Direction	Fathis Handhuvaruge Feshun 3D (Shared with Mohamed Ali)	Nominated	
2014	3rd Maldives Film Awards	Best Sound Editing	Fathis Handhuvaruge Feshun 3D	Nominated	
2014	3rd Maldives Film Awards	Best Sound Mixing	Fathis Handhuvaruge Feshun 3D	Nominated	
2014	3rd Maldives Film Awards	Best Editing - Short film	Voodoo	Nominated	
2015	6th Gaumee Film Awards	Best Editing	Happy Birthday	Won	
2015	6th Gaumee Film Awards	Best Cinematography	Dhin Veynuge Hithaamaigaa	Nominated	
2015	6th Gaumee Film Awards	Best Art Direction	Happy Birthday (Shared with Moomin Fuad, Mohamed Ali)	Nominated	
2015	6th Gaumee Film Awards	Best Art Direction	Dhin Veynuge Hithaamaigaa (Shared with Mohamed Ali)	Nominated	
2016	7th Gaumee Film Awards	Best Director	Fathis Handhuvaruge Feshun 3D	Nominated	
2016	7th Gaumee Film Awards	Best Editing	Fathis Handhuvaruge Feshun 3D	Nominated	
2016	7th Gaumee Film Awards	Best Sound Editing	Fathis Handhuvaruge Feshun 3D	Nominated	
2016	7th Gaumee Film Awards	Best Sound Mixing	Fathis Handhuvaruge Feshun 3D	Nominated	
2016	7th Gaumee Film Awards	Best Art Direction	Fathis Handhuvaruge Feshun 3D (Shared with Mohamed Ali)	Nominated	
2017	8th Gaumee Film Awards	Best Director	Vaashey Mashaa Ekee	Won	
2017	8th Gaumee Film Awards	Best Director	Emme Fahu Vindha Jehendhen	Nominated	
2017	8th Gaumee Film Awards	Best Director - Short film	Voodoo	Won	
2017	8th Gaumee Film Awards	Best Director - Short film	Kashfu	Nominated	
2017	8th Gaumee Film Awards	Best Editing	Vaashey Mashaa Ekee	Won	
2017	8th Gaumee Film Awards	Best Editing	Emme Fahu Vindha Jehendhen	Nominated	
2017	8th Gaumee Film Awards	Best Editing - Short film	Voodoo	Won	
2017	8th Gaumee Film Awards	Best Editing - Short film	Kashfu (Shared with Ahmed Shakir)	Nominated	
2017	8th Gaumee Film Awards	Best Cinematography	Hulhudhaan (Shared with Ahmed Sinan)	Nominated	
2017	8th Gaumee Film Awards	Best Cinematography	Vaashey Mashaa Ekee (Shared with Ahmed Sinan)	Nominated	
2017	8th Gaumee Film Awards	Best Cinematography	Emme Fahu Vindha Jehendhen (Shared with Ahmed Sinan)	Nominated	
2017	8th Gaumee Film Awards	Best Cinematography	Mikoe Bappa Baey Baey	Nominated	
2017	8th Gaumee Film Awards	Best Cinematography	Voodoo	Won	
2017	8th Gaumee Film Awards	Best Cinematography	Kashfu	Nominated	
2017	8th Gaumee Film Awards	Best Sound Editing	Vaashey Mashaa Ekee	Nominated	
2017	8th Gaumee Film Awards	Best Sound Editing	Emme Fahu Vindha Jehendhen (Shared with Mohamed Ikram)	Nominated	
2017	8th Gaumee Film Awards	Best Art Direction	Vaashey Mashaa Ekee (Shared with Mohamed Ali)	Won	
2017	8th Gaumee Film Awards	Best Art Direction	Emme Fahu Vindha Jehendhen (Shared with Mohamed Ali)	Nominated	
2017	8th Gaumee Film Awards	Best Art Direction	Mikoe Bappa Baey Baey (Shared with Mohamed Ali, Ravee Farooq)	Nominated	
2018	National Award of Recognition	Performing Arts - Film direction		Won	
2019	9th Gaumee Film Awards	Best Director	Vakin Loabin	Nominated	
2019	9th Gaumee Film Awards	Best Art Direction	Vakin Loabin (Shared with Mohamed Ali and Aishath Fuad Thaufeeq)	Nominated	
2019	9th Gaumee Film Awards	Best Sound Design	Vakin Loabin	Nominated	
2025	1st MSPA Film Awards	Best Director	Vakin Loabin	Nominated	
2025	1st MSPA Film Awards	Best Director	Maamui	Nominated	
2025	1st MSPA Film Awards	Best Editor	Maamui	Won	
2025	1st MSPA Film Awards	Best Editor	Vakin Loabin	Nominated	
2025	1st MSPA Film Awards	Best Cinematographer	Maamui (Shared with Ahmed Sinan)	Nominated	
2025	1st MSPA Film Awards	Best Cinematographer	November (Shared with Ahmed Sinan)	Nominated	
2025	1st MSPA Film Awards	Best Sound Engineer	Goh Raalhu (Shared with Ahmed Sinan)	Nominated	
2025	1st MSPA Film Awards	Best Sound Engineer	Hindhukolheh	Nominated	
2025	1st MSPA Film Awards	Best Sound Engineer	November	Nominated	
2025	5th Karnataka International Film Festival	Best Cinematography	November (Shared with Ahmed Sinan)	Won	
