= Gaumee Film Award for Best Sound Mixing =

- Awarded for: Best Sound Mixing
- Country: Maldives
- Presented by: National Centre for the Arts

The Gaumee Film Award for Best Sound Mixing is given as part of the Gaumee Film Awards for Maldivian Films.

The award was first given in 1995. Here is a list of the award winners and the nominees of the respective award ceremonies.

== Winners and nominees ==
Year	Photos of winners	Director	Film	Ref(s)
1st (1995)	Not Awarded			
2nd (1997)	Not Awarded			
3rd (2007)	Not Awarded			
4th (2007)	Not Awarded			
5th (2008)	Not Awarded			
6th (2015)		Hussain Shuhadh	Yoosuf	
6th (2015)		Ahmed Nimal, Ayyuman Shareef	Zalzalaa En'buri Aun	
6th (2015)		Mohamed Ikram	Niuma	
7th (2016)		Haisham Shafeeq	Loodhifa	
7th (2016)		Mohamed Ikram	Ingili	
7th (2016)		Mohamed Ikram	Sazaa	
7th (2016)		Ali Musthafa	Dhilakani	
7th (2016)		Ali Shifau	Fathis Handhuvaruge Feshun 3D	
8th (2017)		Mohamed Ikram	Vaashey Mashaa Ekee	
8th (2017)		Ayyuman Shareef, Ahmed Nimal	Aniyaa	
8th (2017)		Mohamed Ikram	24 Gadi Iru	
8th (2017)		Mohamed Ikram	Emme Fahu Vindha Jehendhen	
8th (2017)		Mohamed Ikram	Mikoe Bappa Baey Baey	
9th (2019)	Not Awarded			

== See also ==
- Gaumee Film Awards
