= Olhunuvi Hiyy =

- Directed by: Yoosuf Rafeeu
- Screenplay by: Yoosuf Rafeeu
- Produced by: Yoosuf Rafeeu
- Starring: Ahmed Azim; Mariyam Nisha; Shazuna
- Cinematography: Ahmed Shiyaz
- Edited by: Hassan Khaleel; Yoosuf Rafeeu
- Music by: Euphoriants
- Production company: Bukhari Films
- Release date: 1998
- Country: Maldives
- Language: Dhivehi

Olhunuvi Hiyy is a 1998 Maldivian film written, produced and directed by Yoosuf Rafeeu. Produced by Bukhari Studio, the film stars Ahmed Azim, Mariyam Nisha and Shazuna in pivotal roles.

== Premise ==
Sheeba (Mariyam Nisha) is a young attractive woman working at a restaurant as a waitress. One night, on her way back to home after duty, she was assaulted by one of her pervert customers, and is saved by the cleaner working at the restaurant, Rishwan (Ahmed Azim) a polite, obedient and reticent orphan who is considered an ignorant and mindless man by the rest of their staff. Soon after, a romantic relationship begins between them, while Sheeba's friend, Aathi sets her with a customer who has deeply fallen in love with Sheeba, Zubeyru (Hamid), a wealthy man. Rishwan, a heart patient, catches them together and becomes restless.

Soon after, Sheeba finds out that Zubeyru is a two-faced villain who has recently fled from Police and hence breaks up with him. Hence, Sheeba reconcile with Rishwan and continues their love affair. However things take a downfall when Zubeyru violently confronts him while on duty which causes a panic attack. The doctor advises to replace his heart with a donor's. As soon as he regains consciousness, Rishwan comes back to Sheeba. Their happiness was short-lived as Rishwan dies due to heart failure and Sheeba promises to devote her whole life to him.

== Cast ==
- Ahmed Azim as Rishwan
- Mariyam Nisha as Sheeba
- Shazuna as Aathi
- Hamid as Zubeyru
- Saadhuna as Shiyama
- Arifa Ibrahim as Sheeba's mother
- Abdul Satthar as Doctor
- Hussain Shibau as a customer (Special appearance)
- Sakeena as Zubeyru's mother (Special appearance)

== Soundtrack ==
Track listing
No.	Title	Lyrics	Singer(s)	Length
1.	"Yaaraage Thiya Farikan"	Easa Shareef	Mohamed Rashad
2.	"Neyngey Dhushman"	Ahmed Riza (Tharaboozu)	Mohamed Rashad
3.	"Emme Hiyy Edhey"	Ahmed Riza (Tharaboozu)	Fathimath Zoona

== Reception ==
Upon release, the film received mixed reviews from critics.
