= Shakku =

1988 Maldivian film

- Official film poster
- Directed by: Ahmed Nimal
- Written by: Ahmed Nimal; Abdulla Zaki
- Screenplay by: Ahmed Naeem
- Produced by: Mohamed Saeed
- Starring: Fathimath Rameeza; Asad Shareef; Ahmed Nimal
- Cinematography: Abdulla Zaki
- Music by: Imad Ismail
- Production company: ADFA Films
- Release date: 1988
- Country: Maldives
- Language: Dhivehi

Shakku ("Suspicion") is a 1988 Maldivian film written and directed by Ahmed Nimal. Produced by Mohamed Saeed under ADFA Films, the film stars Fathimath Rameeza, Asad Shareef and Ahmed Nimal in pivotal roles. During the shooting of the film, Nimal and Rameeza began a romantic relationship and got married soon after the premiere of the film.

== Premise ==
Sameer, a short-tempered and underprivileged young man is accused of hitting an attractive wealthy woman, Zeena to whom he responds recklessly. She later apologizes to him and they reconcile and plan a trip together to his home island. The trip ends with them starting a romantic relationship though he had to stay back in his home island. Meanwhile, Sameer's friend, Nahid a single musician helps Sameer in settling down in his life after his marriage with Zeena.

Their life was filled with love and romance until Sameer started suspecting Nahid of having an affair with his wife. When he confronts Zeena about her relationship with Nahid, she becomes furious about his trust issues and moves out of their house in despair. Zeena, with the help of her family tries to get back with him. However, Sameer, being the stubborn husband, instead divorces her. Soon after, Zeena realizes that she is pregnant with a child of his. Meanwhile, Sameer becomes clear of all his suspicions but acknowledges that his time has passed. Having lost a devoted wife and a caring friend, Sameer seeks forgiveness from her family. Dejected he relocates to his island followed by another misery.

== Cast ==
- Ahmed Nimal as Sameer / Zameer
- Fathimath Rameeza as Zeena
- Asad Shareef as Nahid
- Nazima
- Nafeesa
- Hamid
- Aishath Hanim
- Ahmed Naeem
- Abdulla Zaki
- Fathuhullah

== Soundtrack ==
Track listing
No.	Title	Singer(s)	Length
1.	"Ufaaveri Kamey Fun Ufaa"	Shafeeqa Abdul Latheef
2.	"Vindhakee Theehey?"	Shafeeqa Abdul Latheef
3.	"Dhe Aru'shunnah Maruhabaaey"	Shafeeqa Abdul Latheef
4.	"Beevegen Dhey Ufaathah"

== Reception ==
Upon release, the film generally received mixed reviews from critics while Ahmed Nimal's and Fathimath Rameeza's chemistry was particularly praised by the critics and audience. The film did "good business" at the box office.
