= Hadhiyaa =

- Official film poster
- Directed by: Hussain Shihab; Ibrahim Waheed
- Written by: Hussain Shihab
- Screenplay by: Hussain Shihab
- Produced by: Television Maldives
- Starring: Fathimath Rameeza; Ibrahim Rasheed; Ahmed Sharumeel; Mariyam Waheedha
- Cinematography: Ibrahim Waheed
- Edited by: Moosa Haleem
- Music by: Ontrack Studio
- Release date: 1993
- Running time: 173 minutes
- Country: Maldives
- Language: Dhivehi

Hadhiyaa is a 1993 Maldivian film directed co-directed by Hussain Shihab and Ibrahim Waheed. Developed by Television Maldives and written by Shihab, the film stars Fathimath Rameeza, Ibrahim Rasheed, Ahmed Sharumeel and Mariyam Waheedha in pivotal roles.

== Premise ==
Shafraz (Ibrahim Rasheed), along with three of his friends, teases Rishfa (Fathimath Rameeza) when she faints after exiting a Biruveri Hohalha. In return, she humiliates him in front of his friends insisting that he is married to an older woman (Sithi Fulhu). To sort their differences, Rishfa requests him to meet her face-to-face and he accidentally drops an exercise weight on his foot hence meets her on a wheelchair. They slowly bond and initiate a romantic relationship. Few days into their relationship, Rishfa senses an incoming danger which Shafraz rebuffs as a baseless fear. Her father, Rauf (Ahmed Sharumeel), a chef turned singer, visits home and reunites fondly with Rishfa. She started having frequent headaches and hence Shafraz and Rauf insist her for a medical check-up, where the doctor examines her to be diagnosed with brain tumor and persists her to undergo a surgery.

Soon after, Shafraz leaves to an atoll island for few days where he meets a teacher, Shaaira (Mariyam Waheedha) and assists her in restoring electricity in the school. As a token of appreciation, Shaaira invites him home and they introduce to each other. Both Shafraz and Rauf were unable to attend Rishfa's birthday celebrations, which worsen her situation. Rishfa decides conceal her medical condition to her father and boyfriend, and to move ahead with the surgical operation at the risk of being handicapped in the event of operation failure. To dampen the aftermath, Rishfa breaks up with Shafraz. However, Rauf gets hold of her medical prescription and realizes the situation and notifies Shafraz of the same. Later, Rishfa gets back with Shafraz and together they plan to reunite long-lost lovers, Rauf and Shaaira who were separated during Rishfa's childhood as she fears Shaaira intends to replace the place of her birth mother, Shahidha (Lilian Saeed).

== Cast ==
- Fathimath Rameeza as Rishfa
- Ibrahim Rasheed as Shafraz
- Ahmed Sharumeel as Rauf
- Mariyam Waheedha as Shaaira
- Suha as young Rishfa
- Lilian Saeed as Shahidha; Rishfa's mother (special appearance)
- Hussain Shibau as Shafraz's friend
- Naeem as Naeem; Assistant Manager of the school
- Mariyam Manike
- Sithi Fulhu (special appearance)

== Soundtrack ==
Track listing
No.	Title	Lyrics	Singer(s)	Length
1.	"Mithaangaa Mihen Ais Vaanan Bahdhal"	Hussain Shihab	Imaadh Ismail, Shafeeqa Abdul Latheef
2.	"Jaan Dheefa Dhaanvaanee Ufalun"	Hussain Shihab	Hussain Shihab, Mariyam Waheedha
3.	"Magey Dheloluge Noorey"	Hussain Shihab	Aishath Inaya
4.	"Mi Raajjeyge Saafu Vai Libi"	Abdulla Afeef	Ali Rameez

== Reception ==
Upon release, the film received mainly positive reviews from critics where the performance of the actors and the direction was particularly praised by the critics. At the end of its theatrical release, the film was declared a success at box office.
