= Aishath Inaya =

Maldivian singer (born 1968)

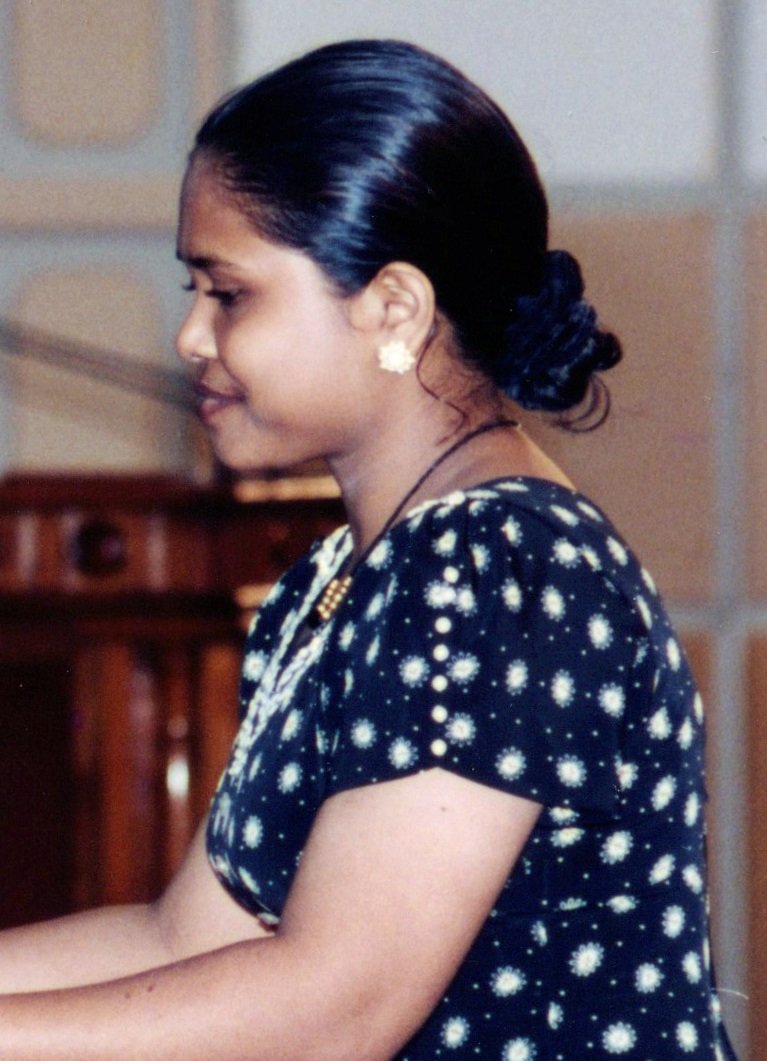
- Inaya receiving the National Award of Recognition, 1995
- Born: 15 May 1968 (age 58); Male', Maldives
- Occupation: Playback singer
- Years active: 1987–present
- Musical career
- Genres: Pop; filmi; electronic
- Instrument: Vocals

Aishath Inaya (15 May 1968) is a Maldivian singer.

== Early life and career ==
Aishath Inaya is the mother of local performer and musician, Andhala Haleem. Inaya started her career in the music industry in 1987, by performing the song "Keerithi Lha Kujja" for the local band Zero Degree. Afterwards, she lent her voice for songs included in the album series of 4 Hand, followed by several stage shows. In 1995, the Government of Maldives honoured her with the National Award of Recognition. Inaya is mainly known for her soft, melodious and subtle songs. In 2018, she was ranked seventh in the list of the "Most Desired Comeback Voices", compiled by Dho?.

== Discography ==
=== Feature film ===
Year	Film	Song	Lyricist(s)	Co-artist(s)	Notes
1993	Gudhurathuge Niyaa	"Foariyaa Ekugaa Dheken Thiya Aee"	Ahmed Sharumeel	Mohamed Rashad	
1993	Gudhurathuge Niyaa	"Natheeja Balaanee"	Ahmed Sharumeel	Mohamed Rashad	
1993	Gudhurathuge Niyaa	"Annaashe Loabin Noora" (Female version)	Ahmed Sharumeel	Solo	
1993	Hadhiyaa	"Magey Dheloluge Noorey"	Hussain Shihab	Solo	
1993	Udhaas	"Milee Dhuniyeyn Ufaa Umurah" (Bonus song)		Solo	Appears in Soundtrack album
1993	Udhaas	"Athugaa Beehilamun" (Bonus song)		Mohamed Rashad	Appears in Soundtrack album
1995	Dhehithehge Loabi	"Hureemey Magey Umurah" (Bonus song)	Ahmed Sharumeel	Solo	Appears in Soundtrack album
2000	Himeyn Dhuniye	"Meygaavee Veynaa Hithaamayaa"	Mohamed Amir Ahmed (Fares)	Solo	
2000	Hithu Vindhu	"Loabin Hoadhan Erey"		Mukhthar Adam	
2002	Kahvalhah Dhaandhen	"Magey Hithuge Shakuvaa"		Solo	
2003	Vehey Vaarey Therein	"Jaadhooga Jehijjey"	Easa Shareef	Mukhthar Adam	
2003	Vehey Vaarey Therein	"Hama Nidhi Nunidheyney"	Easa Shareef	Mukhthar Adam	
2003	Vehey Vaarey Therein	"Kalaa Kalaa"	Easa Shareef	Solo	
2003	Vehey Vaarey Therein	"Kalaa Kalaa" (Remix Version)	Easa Shareef	Solo	Appears in Soundtrack album
2003	Vehey Vaarey Therein	"Veemaa Kairi Moonaa" (Bonus song)	Easa Shareef	Mohamed Zaid	Appears in Soundtrack album
2004	Hama Himeyn	"Loabin Heeleema"	Coco Hassan Haleem	Mohamed Fazeel	
2004	Hama Himeyn	"Adhugaa Nethey Ufaleh"	Coco Hassan Haleem	Solo	
2004	Eynaa	"Naanaa"	Ahmed Nashid (Dharavandhoo)	Solo	
2004	Eynaa	"Moorithi Zuvaan Hinithun"	Ahmed Nashid (Dharavandhoo)	Mukhthar Adam	
2004	Eynaa	"Loabin Thi Loabin"	Ahmed Nashid (Dharavandhoo)	Abdul Baaree	
2005	Zuleykha	"Thi Loaiybah Hiyy Kiyaaleema"	Mausoom Shakir	Ibrahim Zaid Ali	
2006	Hukuru Vileyrey	"Haadha Salhiyey"	Ahmed Nashid (Dharavandhoo)	Solo	
2006	Hithuge Edhun	"Veynee Udhaas"	Ahmed Nashid (Dharavandhoo)	Solo	
2006	Hithuge Edhun	"Haadha Ufaa Ihsaas Vey"	Ahmed Nashid (Dharavandhoo)	Mumthaz Moosa	
2006	Vaaloabi Engeynama	"Vaaloabi Engeynama"	Mohamed Abdul Ghanee	Mohamed Abdul Ghanee	
2008	Khalaas	"Hiyy Gaimey"	Amir Saleem	Mumthaz Moosa	
2009	Karuna Vee Beyvafa	"Thiya Loley"		Mumthaz Moosa	
2009	Baaraige Fas	"Haadha Ey Beynumee Kalaa" (Bonus song)	Adam Haleem Adnan	Mumthaz Moosa	Appears in Soundtrack album
2009	Baaraige Fas	"Loabin Kalaage Athugaa" (Bonus song)	Adam Haleem Adnan	Mohamed Huzam	Appears in Soundtrack album
2010	Jinni	"Kehiveriveeye Kalaa" (Bonus song)		Mumthaz Moosa	Appears in Soundtrack album
2010	Mi Hiyy Keekkuraanee?	"Fun Araamekey Thibaage Loaibakee"		Abdul Baaree	
2024	Gellunu Rey	"Gellunu Rey"		Rilwan	

=== Short film ===
Year	Film	Song	Lyricist(s)	Co-artist(s)
2006	Dheke Dhekeves 3	"Dhoalhuvee Loabin"	Kopee Mohamed Rasheedh	Mumthaz Moosa
2007	Kudafoolhaai Paree Dhahtha	"Barubaadhu Vee Ey Ufalaa Hayaaiy"		Solo
2007	Umurahvess Inthizaaru Kuraanan	"Ey Zuvaan"	Ahmed Nashidh (Dharavandhoo)	Solo

=== Television ===
Year	Film	Song	Lyricist(s)	Co-artist(s)
1994	Manzil	"Dhin Mi Veynun"		Solo
1994	Manzil	"Asaru Nufilaahen"		Solo
1997	Hatharu An'golhi (Teledrama)	"Mee Magey Naseebuhey"	Abdulla Afeef	Solo
2000	Hulhukolhu (Teledrama)	"Thadhaa Veynugaa"	Ahmed Shakeeb	Mohamed Huzam
2000	Dhoapatta	"Farudhaa Mihiyy Kureemaa"		Mohamed Zaid
2002	Enme Kusheh (Teledrama)	"Meeyey Fariyaadhu"		Mohamed Huzam
2003	Miskeen (Teledrama)	"Ey Malaa Ey"		Unknown
2003	Thiyey Mihithuge Vindhakee	"Kihineh Mi Vevey Loaiybaa"	Ahmed Nashid (Dharavandhoo)	Solo
2004	Loabi Nulibunas	"Loabi Dhen Gaimu Vevijjey"	Adam Naseer Ibrahim	Hussain Sobah

=== Non-film songs ===
Year	Film	Song	Lyricist(s)	Co-artist(s)
1987	Single	"Keerithi Lhakujjaa"		Solo
1991	4 Hand 1	"Ufaa Dhey Rabeeun"		Solo
1991	4 Hand 1	"Asaru Nufilaahen"		Solo
1991	4 Hand 1	"Ma Edhi Buneemey"		Solo
1991	4 Hand 1	"Vaanuvaa Neyngifaa"		Solo
1991	4 Hand 1	"Hoadhaalan Edheynamey"		Ali Moosa
1991	4 Hand 1	"Visnaanulaa Iskan Dhemaa"		Ali Moosa
1991	4 Hand 1	"Eki Manzaru Fenidhaathee"		Ali Moosa
1991	4 Hand 1	"Abadhu Loabin Dhe Aawaaraa"		Ali Moosa
1991	4 Hand 1	"Moosun Mi Ufaa Dhey"		Ali Moosa
1991	4 Hand 1	"Hoadheemey Hoadheemey"		Ali Moosa
1991	4 Hand 1	"Dillaa Han'dhey Mi Fazaa Alun"		Ali Moosa
1991	4 Hand 1	"Dheewaanaa Vedhaahaa Varu"		Ali Moosa
1991	4 Hand 2	"Dhin Mi Veynun"		Solo
1991	4 Hand 2	"Roalheege Samaasaigaa"		Solo
1991	4 Hand 2	"Ivvaa Ivvaa Raagugaa"		Solo
1991	4 Hand 2	"Bunedhey Thedhekey"		Ali Moosa
1991	4 Hand 2	"Mee Amaankan Libey Roohekey"		Ali Moosa
1991	4 Hand 2	"O Neyngi Vakiveebaaey"		Ali Moosa
1991	4 Hand 2	"Mendhan Vumun Han'dhaan"		Ali Moosa
1991	4 Hand 2	"Abadhu Magey Hithuga Veyey"		Ali Moosa
1991	4 Hand 2	"Himeyn Dhanvaru Veyey"		Ali Moosa
1991	4 Hand 3	"Nethey Mi Edheyhen"		Solo
1991	4 Hand 3	"Ramzu Kuri Mee Han'dhaaney"		Solo
1991	4 Hand 3	"Mi Dhathi Hithi Veynaa Karunun"		Solo
1991	4 Hand 3	"Roalhi Nayaa Dhin Mee Bahaarekey"		Ibrahim Didi
1991	4 Hand 3	"Inthizaarugaa Hureemey"		Ibrahim Didi
1991	4 Hand 3	"Hiyy Abadhu Govaa E Hoadhanee"		Ibrahim Didi
1991	4 Hand 3	"Hithaa Mi Seedhaa Kulhelaafaa"		Ibrahim Didi
1991	4 Hand 3	"Gaimu Thedhey"		Ibrahim Didi
1992	4 Hand 4	"Dheythoa Dheythoa Vee Balan"	Ibrahim Didi	Ibrahim Didi
1992	4 Hand 4	"Fikuraa Vedheyney Zamaaneh"	Ibrahim Didi	Ibrahim Didi
1992	4 Hand 4	"Mee Neyngey Bahekey"	Ibrahim Didi	Ibrahim Didi
1992	4 Hand 4	"Moosumey Bahaarey Mee Ufaa"	Ibrahim Didi	Mohamed Rashad
1992	4 Hand 4	"Asaru Meyge Vindhaa"	Ibrahim Didi	Mohamed Rashad
1992	4 Hand 4	"Neyngey Faruvaa Mi Edhey Khiyaal"	Ibrahim Didi	Ali Moosa, Mariyam Waheedha
1992	4 Hand 4	"Thiya Nan Kiyumun"	Ibrahim Didi	Solo
1992	4 Hand 4	"Hithuge Vindhaa"	Ibrahim Didi	Solo
1992	4 Hand 4	"Thee Magey Vindhakee"	Ibrahim Didi	Solo
1992	4 Hand 5	"Nuvey Mi Gulshange Roalhi Aumeh"		Mohamed Rashad
1992	Galaxyge Therein 3	"Raagey Mi Reyrey Ivvaa"		Solo
1993	Inthizaaru	"Dheythoa Yaaraa Beynunvaa Mee"		Solo
1993	Inthizaaru	"Mi Kuraa Asaru Han'dhaanaa"		Solo
1993	Inthizaaru	"Ve Dheewaanaa"		Solo
1993	Inthizaaru	"Yaaru Hinithun Vaanethee"		Solo
1993	Inthizaaru	"Heeleemaa Kalaa Thunfathugaa"		Muaviyath Anwar
1994	Loodhifaa	"Dheyn Bunihaa Hadhiyaa Kobaa"	Easa Shareef	Ali Rasheed (Stepin)
1994	Loodhifaa	"Nagaashe Chandhaa"	Kaneeru Abdul Raheem	Ali Rasheed (Stepin)
1994	Single	"Eid Aee Maruhabaa Kiyaalaa"		Solo
1994	Aadheys	"Isve Haaziruvee"	Coco Hassan Haleem	Solo
1994	Aadheys	"Roan Roan Adhu Veemaa"	Ahmed Shakeeb	Solo
1995	Aniyaa	"Milkuvi Ran Dhauru Magey"	Tharaboozu Ahmed Riza	Mohamed Rashad
1995	Gagunas	"Saharoa"	Kopee Mohamed Rasheed	Solo
1995	Kresendo '95	"Dhen Thibey Khiyaalukoh"		Hassan Ilham
1995	Giguni	"Mithuraa Yaaraa Hoadhaashey"		Mohamed Shahuban
1995	Giguni	"Oyaadhaa Khiyaalaa"		Mohamed Shahuban
1995	Giguni	"Saahibaa Theehey Jaanaa"		Mohamed Shahuban
1995	Giguni	"Dhimaavee Nazaru"		Mohamed Shahuban
1995	Giguni	"Leyge Foaraa Zaathu"		Mohamed Shahuban
1995	Giguni	"Beynumee Dhey Rahum"		Mohamed Shahuban
1995	Giguni	"Thoa Saalu Mi Elhey"		Mohamed Shahuban
1995	Giguni	"Thasveeru Dhenee Dhirumey"		Mohamed Shahuban
1996	Shakuvaa	"Han'dhaaney Vanee Meygaa"	Ahmed Shakeeb	Solo
1996	Shakuvaa	"Dhanee Dhanee Merigen Loa"	Ahmed Shakeeb	Ali Rameez
1996	Shakuvaa	"Moodhaa Ufaa Vee"	Coco Hassan Haleem	Ali Rameez
1997	Asseyri	"Hiyy Dheewaanaa Dhin Aniyaigaa"		Abdul Sameeu
1997	Asseyri	"Rey Reyge Gulhun"		Mohamed Shahuban
1997	Asseyri	"Vaareyga Veemey"		Ali Rameez
1997	Raahi	"Keevvee Belee"	Kopee Mohamed Rasheed	Abdulla Waheed (Waddey)
1997	Shabaab	"Dhirihuri Furaana Dhaanee"	Ahmed Shakeeb	Solo
1997	Shabaab	"Kuruvi Han'dhaan"	Ahmed Shakeeb	Solo
1998	Dhanmaanu	"Magey Hithuge Shakuvaa"		Solo
1998	Dhanmaanu	"Vey Han'dhaan"		Solo
1998	Dhanmaanu	"Thaqudheerugaa Nuveehey"		Solo
1998	Dhanmaanu	"Fenifaa Ehaa Hinithunveleemey"		Solo
1998	Dhanmaanu	"Beykaaru Loabi Veemaa"		Solo
1998	Dhanmaanu	"Fenifaa Reethi Balaalun"		Solo
1998	Dhanmaanu	"Loabin Hoadhan Erey"		Mukhthar Adam
1999	Endheyyo	"Han'dhuvaru Matheegaa"		Solo
1999	Endheyyo	"Seedhaa Seedhaa Dheynanhey"		Mukhthar Adam
2000	Single	"Anaage Hithugaa"	Saikuraa Ibrahim Naeem	Solo
2001	Boduraalhu	"Huree Loabin Fenilaathee Ey"		Ahmed Mohamed Didi
2001	Boduraalhu	"Govijje Nadhuru Mirey"		Abdul Baaree
2001	Boduraalhu	"Ufaavey Fenuneemaa"	Coco Hassan Haleem	Umar Zahir
2001	Boduraalhu	"Farudhaa Mihiyy Kureemaa"		Mohamed Zaid
2001	Boduraalhu	"Reythakun Baakeeve Ma Dhaathee"		Solo
2001	Boduraalhu	"Aaveyey Aavey Han'dhaan"	Adam Haleem Adnan	Solo
2001	Dhonkan'bulo	"Dhonkan'bulo Nidhaalaashey" (Female Version)	Ameen Ibrahim	Solo
2001	Rukkuri 3	"Dheki Feni Rakivegen"	Ahmed Nashid (Dharavandhoo)	Hassan Ilham
2001	Rukkuri 3	"Mulhi Hiyy Ekee Oyaalaa"	Ahmed Nashid (Dharavandhoo)	Abdul Baaree
2001	Shoakh	"Gennan Abadhume Reyrey"	Ismail Abdul Qadhir	Umar Zahir
2001	Shoakh	"Nubeleyhe Kalaa Dhaathan"	Ahmed Shakeeb	Mukhthar Adam
2002	Hithakah	"Aharenge Hiyy Ronee"		Solo
2002	Hithakah	"Hiya Ufaavee Rey"		Mukhthar Adam
2002	Vakivumuge Kurin	"Loabi Dhin Erey"		Solo
2003	Jaadhoo	"Hiyy Firumaafa Nudhaashey"	Ahmed Nashid (Dharavandhoo)	Hassan Ilham
2003	Kinaaree	"Dhon Aimina"	Ahmed Nashid (Dharavandhoo)	Hassan Ilham
2003	Rahum	"Yaaraa Aeemaa"		Mukhthar Adam
2003	Rahum	"Haalu Bunedhemun Mirey"		Mukhthar Adam
2003	Rahum	"Hithugaa Han'dhaan"		Mukhthar Adam
2003	Rahum	"Dhegotheh Nuvaanehen"		Solo
2003	Rahum	"Thiya Namey Hithugaa"		Solo
2003	Rama	"Reydhuvaa Misraabun"		Solo
2003	Rama	"Reydhuvaa Vaathee Nayaa"		Muad
2003	Rama	"Reyrey Hoadheemey"		Ibrahim Niyaz (Thu)
2003	Fannaanun	"Ufaaveri Ekuveri Vetteh"		Various Artists
2004	Yaaraa	"Nalayey Kalaa"	Abdulla Muaz Yoosuf	Hassan Ilham
2004	Hiyy	"Dhusheemey Nidheegaa Samaasaa"		Mohamed Fazeel
2004	Hiyy	"Dheyshey Hiyyves Nubuney"	Ahmed Nashid (Dharavandhoo)	Hussain Inaz
2004	Dhonaa	"Reyves Naeema Ey"		Solo
2004	Dhonaa	"Inthihaa Loabiveemaa"		Mukhthar Adam
2004	Saahil	"Nubalaa Dheveyhe Fenuneemaa"	Ahmed Nashid (Dharavandhoo)	Mohamed Zaid
2004	Saahil	"Loabin Thi Loabin"	Ahmed Nashid (Dharavandhoo)	Abdul Baaree
2004	Saahil	"Moorithi Zuvaan Hinithun"	Ahmed Nashid (Dharavandhoo)	Mukhthar Adam
2004	Single	"Reethi Mithuru Heeleemaa"		Solo
2004	Ehan'dhaanugai...	"Han'dhuves Nagaafaa Vedhumakah"		Solo
2004	Vidhaathari	"Ran Reethi Nikan Hoonu"	Abdul Muhaimin	Ahmed Amir
2005	Fura Dhanvaru	"Hoadhaa Balamundhaa"	Shareefa Fakhry	Solo
2005	Hiyy Dheefaa	"Fenna Hin'dhu Konme Thaakun"	Abdulla Muaz Yoosuf	Mumthaz Moosa
2005	Hiyy Dheefaa	"Vaguthey Dhoa Loa"		Mumthaz Moosa
2005	Kuri Inthizaarugai... (VCD)	"Ey Loabivaa, Thee Magey Yaarakee"		Hussain Inaz
2005	Yaaraa 2	"Veereethi Neyngey Neyngey"	Ahmed Nashid (Dharavandhoo)	Mohamed Abdul Ghanee
2005	Single	"Suvaal Kurey Yaaru"		Mukhthar Adam
2005	Leyfavethi	"Thi Fari Fari Moonaa"	Amir Saleem	Mohamed Fazeel
2005	Maahiyaa	"Jaanaa, Hiyy Vaneeyey Dhiwaanaa"	Adam Naseer Ibrahim	Hassan Ilham
2005	Single	"Gislaa Rovey Goiyvey"	Mohamed Shamin	Mohamed Huzam
2005	Qaumee Dhuvas 1426	"Eheree Dhivehi Nishaan"	Maumoon Abdul Gayoom	Mohamed Huzam, Ahmed Aathif, Hussain Ali
2005	Ulhe Ulhefa	"Manzil Manzil"	Ahmed Nashid (Dharavandhoo)	Mohamed Abdul Ghanee
2005	Ehan'dhaanugai...	"Thaazaa Mee Bageechaage Hedhey"		Solo
2006	Fari Dheyliyaa	"Kehidheefaa Aharennah"		Solo
2006	Yaaraa 3	"Keehvehey Mihen Mivee"	Ahmed Nashid (Dharavandhoo)	Mukhthar Adam
2006	Keehve..?	"Thiya Loley"		Mumthaz Moosa
2006	Jism	"Yaaru Hiyy Edhey"	Adam Haleem Adnan	Abdul Baaree
2006	Mihithun	"Han'dhaa Ey Loabivaa"	Mohamed Abdul Ghanee	Mohamed Zaid
2006	Mihan'dhaanugai...	"Aakujjekey Dhasvee Fahun"	Abdulla Sodhiq	Solo
2006	Oh' Salhi	"Dhoalhuvee Loabin"	Kopee Mohamed Rasheed	Mumthaz Moosa
2007	Hiyy Kiyaathee	"Yaaraa Ey Magey"	Ahmed Nashid (Dharavandhoo)	Hassan Ilham
2007	Hiyy Beynumey	"Loaiybakee"	Ahmed Falah	Ahmed Falah, Hussain Sobah
2007	Hiyy Dheebalaa	"Masthee Veveneethoa"	Ahmed Nashid (Dharavandhoo)	Ibrahim Zaid Ali
2007	Hiyy Dheebalaa	"Zaharu Thiya Hithugaavey"	Ahmed Nashid (Dharavandhoo)	Solo
2007	Loabin Hinithunvelaashey	"Yaaraa Ey Loabivey"	Ahmed Haleem	Mumthaz Moosa
2007	Mahinooru (VCD)	"Lolugaavaa Lolugaavaa Mahinoorey Thiee"		Abdulla Waheed (Waddey)
2007	Thihan'dhaanugai...	"Loabi Vevidhaanebaa"	Mohamed Zahid	Solo
2008	Beywafaa Viyas	"Mi Zuvaan Zuvaan Hiyy"	Adam Haleem Adnan	Hussain Ali
2008	Beywafaa Viyas	"Vindhaa Gulhifaa Veemaa"	Adam Haleem Adnan	Mumthaz Moosa
2008	Beywafaa Viyas	"Fun Araamekey Thibaage Loaiybakee"		Abdul Baaree
2008	Hiyy Dhoovee	"Sirru Sirrun Hithey"	Ibrahim Rasheed	Hassan Ilham
2008	Thihan'dhaanugai Remix	"Manzil Thiyey Mihiyy Edhey"		Solo
2009	Yaaraa 4	"Haadha Salhiyey Ey Loabee"	Ahmed Nashid (Dharavandhoo)	Solo
2009	Hiyy Furendhen	"Hithuge Nazarey Thiee"		Mukhthar Adam
2009	Hiyy Furendhen	"Yaaru Hiyy Keemathaa"		Mumthaz Moosa
2012	Edhuvasthah	"Mirey Mihithuge Haalakeethoa"		Solo

== Accolades ==
Year	Award	Category	Nominated work	Result	Ref(s)
1995	National Award of Recognition	Performing Arts - Singing		Won	
