= Gudhurathuge Niyaa =

- Official film poster
- Directed by: Fazeen Ahmed; Hassan Haleem
- Written by: Ahmed Sharumeel
- Screenplay by: Hassan Haleem
- Produced by: Ahmed Manik
- Starring: Fazeen Ahmed; Shaila Fazeen; Ahmed Sharumeel; Zahwan Zaid
- Cinematography: Hassan Haleem
- Edited by: Shukoor
- Music by: Mohamed Rashad
- Production company: Television Maldives
- Distributed by: Television Maldives
- Release date: 1993
- Country: Maldives
- Language: Dhivehi

Gudhurathuge Niyaa is a 1993 Maldivian film co-directed by Fazeen Ahmed and Hassan Haleem. Produced by Ahmed Manik, the film stars Fazeen Ahmed, Shaila Fazeen, Ahmed Sharumeel and Zahwan Zaid in pivotal roles.

== Premise ==
Sameena (Aminath Didi), a preservative single mother is desperate to find the ideal wife for her young, carefree son, Ibrahim Riyaz (Fazeen Ahmed). Sameena, aided by the greedy woman, Hareera (Sithi Fulhu) introduces him to a young woman, Pareeza (Saeedha), whom he scares off saying he is mentally unstable. Meanwhile, Riyaz initiates a romantic relationship with Nihama Waheed (Shaila Fazeen) who initially fails to impress Sameena with her modern attire. Soon after the confusion was cleared and the couple gets married.

Meanwhile, the heartbroken Romeo Qadhir, (Mohamed Arif) is determined to break off their marriage with the help of Hareera. One night, on his way back home, Riyaz crashes into Mahmood's (Ahmed Sharumeel) pick-up and dies due to his severe injuries while Nihama is revealed to be pregnant. Nihama gives birth to a boy, Mahthu. At the age of three, Mahthu befriends with Mahmood unbeknownst to each other of their family rivalry. Qadhir makes it his life mission to eliminate Mahmood from his unrequited love equation.

== Cast ==
- Fazeen Ahmed as Ibrahim Riyaz
- Shaila Fazeen as Nihama Waheed
- Ahmed Sharumeel as Mahmood
- Zahwan Zaid as Mahthu
- Aminath Didi as Sameena
- Aishath Waheedha as Raziyya
- Sithi Fulhu as Hareera
- Mohamed Arif as Qadhir
- Saeedha as Pareeza
- Mohamed Shareef as Doctor
- Amir as Lahchey
- Ibrahim Shakir as Police Inspector

== Soundtrack ==
Track listing
No.	Title	Lyrics	Singer(s)	Length
1.	"Foariyaa Ekugaa Dheken Thiya Aee"	Ahmed Sharumeel	Mohamed Rashad, Aishath Inaya
2.	"Natheeja Balaanee"	Ahmed Sharumeel	Mohamed Rashad, Aishath Inaya
3.	"Loabi Gehligen Dhiyaa"	Ahmed Sharumeel	Aishath Inaya
4.	"Annaashe Loabin Noora" (Female version)	Ahmed Sharumeel	Aishath Inaya
5.	"Annaashe Loabin Noora" (Male version)	Ahmed Sharumeel	Mohamed Rashad

== Reception ==
The film received mixed reviews from critics where the child actor's mature performance and Sithi Fulhu's comical performance in the film were particularly praised by the audience.
