= Shafeeqa Abdul Latheef =

Maldivian female singer

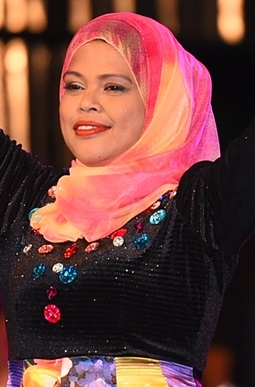
- Latheef performing at the Eid Kulhivaru Show, 2015
- Born: 1 May 1961 (age 64); Male', Maldives
- Occupation: Playback singer
- Years active: 1982–present
- Children: Mariyam Unoosha
- Musical career
- Genres: Pop; filmi; electronic
- Instrument: Vocals

Shafeeqa Abdul Latheef (1 May 1961) is a Maldivian playback singer.

== Career ==
Shafeeqa Abdul Latheef comes from a family with a strong musical background, her father, Abdul Latheef, being a notable musician in his prime years. Influenced by Hindustani music and inspired by renowned singers like Asha Bhosle, she began her singing journey at a young age. In 1982, an important opportunity arose when musician Imaadh Ismail and members of the Summer band were in search of a female vocalist. She participated in a brief audition which was rejected by the band members and instead requested her to render the song "Dil Ke Armaan Aansuo Me Bah Gaye" from the film Nikaah. Impressed by her performance, they invited her to perform at the Gadhanoo Carnival, where her local adaptation of the song the same song titled "Dhevvi Faruvaayaa Shifaa" earned her widespread recognition.

Following this, Shafeeqa's musical journey continued as she lent her voice to various films, including Shakku, Nufolhey Maa, Karunaige Agu, Loabeege Thoofan, Hadhiyaa, Imthihaan and Alathu Loabi most of which are composed and co-sung with Imaadh Ismail. In addition to her film work, she has been a part of several musical groups such as Waves band, Antaris band and Olympians. Her involvement with the Olympians band, in particular, earned her recognition as a lead singer within the group. Shafeeqa's musical contributions extended to studio albums, with notable tracks including "Edhigen Mirey Dhaanamey" and "Fun Zakham Kuruvi Ramzun" for Galaxyge Therein 1, "Ey Keehvebaa Ithubaaru Kuraashey" for Galaxyge Therein 2, "Habeebee Habeebee" for Hulhudhaan, "Loa Tholhey Loa Tholhey" for the short film Dheke Dhekeves 4 and her songs from Chance and Thari.

In recognition of her musical achievements and dedication to the craft, Shafeeqa received the National Award of Recognition from the Government of Maldives in 1992.

== Personal life ==
At the peak of her career, Shafeeqa married Imaadh Ismail and they had three children, including the notable singer Mariyam Unoosha. However, following a decade of marriage, the couple underwent a separation as the former was imprisoned allegedly for drug abuse and was later sentenced to two years of banishment. Shafeeqa embarked on a new chapter in August 2018, uniting in marriage with a man nearly eleven years her junior.

== Discography ==
=== Feature film ===
Year	Film	Song	Lyricist(s)	Co-artist(s)
1987	Maqsadh	"Hayaathaa Gulhunee"		Imaadh Ismail
1988	Shakku	"Ufaaverikamey Fun Ufaa"		Imaadh Ismail
1988	Shakku	"Vindhakee Theehey"		Imaadh Ismail
1988	Shakku	"Dhe Arushunnah Maruhabaa Ey"		Ibrahim Shakeeb
1989	Nufolhey Maa	"Khiyaalu Oyaadhaa"	Chilhiya Moosa Manik	Imaadh Ismail
1989	Nufolhey Maa	"Ma Mi Dheewaanaa Veemaahey"	Chilhiya Moosa Manik	Imaadh Ismail
1989	Nufolhey Maa	"Hiyy Mi Dhenee"	Chilhiya Moosa Manik	Imaadh Ismail
1989	Loabi Vevidhaane	"Dheewaanaakan Dhaaney"		Imaadh Ismail
1989	Loabi Vevidhaane	"Edhey Manzil Kobaibaa Ey"		Imaadh Ismail
1990	Karunaige Agu	"Mifaraaiy Balaabalaashey"	Kaneeru Abdul Raheem	Abdul Hannan Moosa Didi
1990	Karunaige Agu	"Nikamethi Ehaa Dhera Meehakeen"	Kaneeru Abdul Raheem	Solo
1990	Karunaige Agu	"Lavvaashi Rahumathugaa Kalaa"	Kaneeru Abdul Raheem	Solo
1991	Loabeege Thoofan	"Naangaanuhey Sirrun Thiya Hiyy"	Easa Shareef	Imaadh Ismail
1993	Hadhiyaa	"Mithaan'gaa Mihen Ais Vaanan Bahdhal"	Hussain Shihab	Imaadh Ismail
1993	Imthihaan	"Buneemey Vamey Khaassa Vaavaru"		Imaadh Ismail
1993	Imthihaan	"Hoadhaashe Dhaanee"		Mohamed Rashad
1994	Alathu Loabi	"Ishaaraathu Libenee Dhuru Dhurun Dhey"	Easa Shareef	Imaadh Ismail

=== Short-film songs ===
Year	Film	Song	Lyricist(s)	Co-artist(s)
2006	Dheke Dhekeves 4	"Loa Tholhey Loa Tholhey"	Hassan Rasheedh	Mumthaz Moosa

=== Non-film songs ===
Year	Album/single	Song	Lyricist(s)	Co-artist(s)
NA	Single	"Fakhuruveri Mi Eidhuge Thahaanee"		Abdul Hannan Moosa Didi, Fathimath Rauf, Mahumoodha Shakeeb
1982	Single	"Dhevvi Faruvaayaa Shifaa"	Ibrahim Mansoor	Solo
1988	Single	"Gandhee Bunaa Thedhey Thiyaee"		Ibrahim Hamdhee
1989	Galaxyge Therein 1	"Edhigen Mirey Dhaanamey"		Imaadh Ismail
1989	Galaxyge Therein 1	"Fun Zakham Kuruvi Ramzun"	Kaneeru Abdul Raheem	Imaadh Ismail
1991	Galaxyge Therein 2	"Mi Vaahaa Ufaa Adhu Nidheebaa"	Funama Adam Manik	Solo
1991	Galaxyge Therein 2	"Ufalaa Ekee Libey Ruhun"		Imaadh Ismail
1991	Galaxyge Therein 2	"Ey Keehvebaa Ithubaaru Kuraashey"		Ibrahim Shakeeb
1992	Chance	"Buneemey Vamey Khaassa Vaavaru"		Imaadh Ismail
1992	Chance	"Maayoos Veethi Haal"		Imaadh Ismail
1992	Chance	"Hoadhaashe Dhaanee"		Mohamed Rashad
1992	Chance	"Farikamuge Inthihaa Thaa Ey"		Ibrahim Shakeeb
1992	Chance	"Han'dhumavee Gandhee Bunaa"		Solo
1992	Chance	"Hureeme Loabi Libeyne Hithaa"		Solo
1992	Chance	"Tholhilaanamey Tholhilaanee"		Solo
1993	Saalhan'ga	"Gendhanyaa Gendhavaashey"	Easa Shareef	Hussain Rasheedh
1993	Thari – 1	"Ishaaraathu Libenee Dhuru Dhurun Dhey"	Easa Shareef	Imaadh Ismail
1993	Thari – 1	"Furathama Neyngi Noonhey Loabi Vanee"	Easa Shareef	Ibrahim Shakeeb
1993	Thari – 1	"Nan Hithugaa Aaveyey"		Ibrahim Shakeeb
1993	Thari – 2	"Hiyy Mi Dhenee"	Chilhiya Moosa Manik	Imaadh Ismail
1993	Thari – 2	"Khiyaalu Oyaadhaa"	Chilhiya Moosa Manik	Imaadh Ismail
1993	Thari – 2	"Mami Dheewaanaa Veemaahey"	Chilhiya Moosa Manik	Imaadh Ismail
1993	Thari – 2	"Goahee Lafuzu Loabihey"	Easa Shareef	Imaadh Ismail
1994	Galaxyge Therein 5	"Thihan'dhaan Numedhaa"		Abdul Raoof
1994	Galaxyge Therein 5	"Neredhenhe Balan"		Ibrahim Shakeeb
1994	Thari – 4	"Bappa Huttey"		Solo
1994	Thari – 4	"Beeve Gelley Ufaathah" (Female Version)		Solo
1994	Thari – 4	"Dhe Arooshunah Maruhabaa Ey"		Ibrahim Shakeeb
1994	Thari – 4	"Gaigoalhi Vevumun Kalaayaa"		Imaadh Ismail
1994	Thari – 4	"Ufaaverikamey Fun Ufaa"		Imaadh Ismail
1994	Thari – 4	"Vindhakee Theehey"		Imaadh Ismail
1994	Fazaa	"Fini Roalhithah E Kuruvee" (Female Version)		Solo
1994	Fazaa	"Loabin Miadhu Govaalee"		Solo
1994	Fazaa	"Kalaa Thi Dheyhaa Masthee Asarugaa"	Imaadh Ismail	Imaadh Ismail
1994	Fazaa	"Loabi Dhey Ishaaraathey"		Imaadh Ismail
1994	Fazaa	"Hiyy Dhee Nugendhaashey"		Imaadh Ismail
1994	Fazaa	"Dhin Han'dhaan Aavey"		Easa Moosa
1994	Thari – 5	"Magu Olhidhaan Mikamugaahey"		Imaadh Ismail
1994	Thari – 5	"Naangaa Noonhey Sirrun"	Easa Shareef	Imaadh Ismail
1994	Thari – 5	"Haalaathu Badhal Veythoa"	Easa Shareef	Massoodh Moosa Didi
1994	Thari – 5	"Abadhu Khiyaalu Kuruvaathee"	Easa Shareef	Solo
2001	Dhalha	"Alhe Alhe Nukulheyshey Hithaa"		Abdul Raoof
2001	Dhalha	"Goanaa Nukurey Roanaavey"		Abdul Raoof
2001	Dhooni	"Antharees Vedhaaneyhe Bunedhee"		Ibrahim Shakeeb
2001	Dhooni	"Jaadhuvee Thiya Zuvaan Moonugaa"		Solo
2001	Dhooni	"Hiyy Loabivaage Meygaa"		Solo
2001	Single	"Foohin Dhineehey Mi Aniyaa"		Solo
2002	Abaarana	"Themigen E Ai Reyrey"		Solo
2002	Abaarana	"Thunfathuge Thi Beehun"	Easa Shareef	Imaadh Ismail
2002	Hithuge Loabi	"E Han'dhuves Yaqeeney"		Ibrahim Shakeeb
2002	Hithuge Loabi	"Zuvaanaa Aadhey"		Mahmoodha Shakeeb
2002	Hulhudhaan	"Habeebee Habeebee"		Solo
2002	Hulhudhaan	"Vindhakee Meyga Vaahaa Thiyey"		Solo
2002	Raiyvilaa	"Masthu Ma Vaavaru"		Solo
2002	Raiyvilaa	"Libeythoa Dhineemey"		Solo
2003	Hadhiyaa	"Yaarakee Magey Theeyey"		Solo
2003	Hadhiyaa	"Ishaaraathun Jaadhoo Hedhee"		Solo
2003	Mendhan	"Huvayaa Iquraaru Uvaafaa"		Majeedh Ismail, Lileetha Massoodh
2003	Mendhan	"Karuna"		Majeedh Ismail
2003	Mendhan	"Jaadhoo"		Solo
2003	Mendhan	"Habeebee Habeebee"		Solo
2003	Saamaraa 3	"Foodhey Mi Dheloa Karunun Ohorey"		Solo
2003	Saamaraa 3	"Khiyaalu Kuri E Maazee"	Ahmed Sharumeel	Massoodh Moosa Didi
2003	Qaumee Lava: Vol. 1	"Masverikamah"		Solo
2003	Qaumee Lava: Vol. 1	"Ginaguna Mi Ai Badhalu"		Sofoora Khaleel
2004	Han'dhaan	"Loabeege Dhaanun"		Solo
2004	Moosun	"Hiyy Edhey Moonakee Thee Zuvaan"		Solo
2004	Moosun	"San'dhuravirey"		Solo
2004	Nazaru	"Lhenbahuge Ishqu"		Ibrahim Shakeeb
2006	Oh' Salhi	"Loa Tholhey Loa Tholhey"	Hassan Rasheedh	Mumthaz Moosa
2017	Ran Han'dhaanugai: S02	"Loaiybakee Zaharu"		Hassan Ilham
2020	Eid Majaa 1441	"Sazaa Mee Sazaa"	Hussain Sobah	Hussain Sobah
2020	Eid Majaa 1441	"Fura Mendhamuga Loa Merilayey"	Mariyam Waheedha	Hussain Sobah
2021	Old Is Gold	"Gislaa Roveyney"	Kaneeru Abdul Raheem	Solo
2021	Old Is Gold	"Nuhanu Dhurugaa Vaathee"	Mariyam Waheedha	Solo
2021	Old Is Gold	"Good Luck Muniyaa"	Lileetha Massoodh	Solo
2021	Old Is Gold	"Dhevvi Faruvaayaa Shifaa"	Ibrahim Mansoor	Solo
2021	Single	"Mifaraaiy Balaabalaashey"	Kaneeru Abdul Raheem	Solo
2022	Single	"Maruvedhaandhen Kiyaanee Thi Nan"	Mohamed Abdul Ghanee	Mohamed Fazeen
2022	Single	"Astha Aee Bala Eidhey"	Mohamed Fazeen	Mohamed Fazeen
2022	Single	"Nasraa Naseebun Amaan"	Abdulla Afeef	Mohamed Fazeen
2022	Single	"Mi Ai Jumhooree"	Abdulla Afeef	Mohamed Fazeen
2023	Single	"Eidhey Aee Heelamun"	Abdulla Afeef	Mohamed Fazeen
2023	Single	"Mi Raagaa Mi Moosun"	Aishath Sharumeela Hassan	Mohamed Fazeen
2023	Single	"Enmen Ufaa Kuraa"	Abdulla Afeef	Mohamed Fazeen
2024	Single	"Fun Zakham Kuruvi Ramzun"		Mohamed Fazeen
2025	Soba Unwind	"Gandhee Bunaa Thedhey Thiyaee"		Hussain Sobah
2025	Soba Unwind	"Kuramey Huvaa Dhulaa Hithun"	Ahmed Shaz (Thajoo)	Hussain Sobah
2025	Soba Unwind	"Fun Zakham Kuruvi Ramzun"	Yoosuf Mohamedfulhu	Hussain Sobah
2025	Soba Unwind	"Keiy Mi Nuvaathee Kiyaadhemey"	Hussain Sobah	Hussain Sobah
2025	Soba Unwind	"Fura Mendhamuga Loa Merilayey"	Mariyam Waheedha	Hussain Sobah

== Accolades ==
Year	Award	Category	Nominated work	Result	Ref(s)
1992	National Award of Recognition	Performing Arts – Singing		Won	
