= Hiyani =

- Official film poster
- Directed by: Ahmed Nimal
- Written by: Ahmed Nimal
- Screenplay by: Ahmed Nimal
- Produced by: Mohamed Abdulla
- Starring: Niuma Mohamed; Ravee Farooq; Lufshan Shakeeb; Ahmed Nimal
- Cinematography: Ibrahim Moosa
- Edited by: Yoosuf Shafeeu
- Music by: Jeeva
- Production company: Dhekedheke Ves Productions
- Release date: August 6, 2006
- Country: Maldives
- Language: Dhivehi

Hiyani (transl. Shadow) is a 2006 Maldivian revenge thriller film written and directed by Ahmed Nimal. Produced by Mohamed Abdulla under Dhekedheke Ves Productions, the film stars Niuma Mohamed, Ravee Farooq, Ahmed Nimal and Lufshan Shakeeb in pivotal roles. Shooting of the film took place in R. Inguraidhoo and R. Maduvvaree.

== Plot ==
Despite her mother's consent, Shaina (Niuma Mohamed) marries to an old, wealthy businessman, Zahid (Ahmed Nimal since she was in need of money for her mother's medical treatments. Their marital satisfaction fades over time mostly due to the significant age gap between the partners. While Shaina continues believing in Zahid's affection, he enjoys finding comfort in other women's bed. To clear out their differences, Shaina and Zahid went to his island for few days and an intimacy was developed among them. Suddenly, Zahid had to leave since one of his construction workers fell from a high location and lands in a critical condition.

One night, when Shaina was alone at a coffee shop, she receives a phone call from a mysterious man saying he likes her. She quickly returns home while being followed by a man wearing a black mask and hearing him whistles. That night, Hussain, an elderly person who is in-charge of their accommodation and transportation, informs his rapid departure to his own island upon hearing his father's illness. Zahid had to stay back for two more days, since the construction worker dies due to the injury. Shaina is then introduced to a dancer, Ziyan (Ravee Farooq) who flaunts her with his generous deeds. Things did not go as planned when Shaina disapproves his teasing and flirting. On the night of Zahid's return, Ziyan attacks him, ties him up to a tree and reveals his intention to marry Shaina before murdering him.

Ziyan breaks into Shaina's house and surprised her with his presence while informing her about Zahid's death. Strung, she tries to call the island chief but Ziyan unfolds his master-plan of blaming Zahid's death on Shaina with different scenarios and manipulates her. Shaina lies to the island chief and informs about his disappearance only. Zahid's clothes stained with blood were discovered by the authorities and the news spread to the whole atoll. Shaina discovers that Zahid transferred all his property and assets to Shaina's name prior to his death. Ziyan blackmails her and extract money from her on several occasion. Shaina's ex-lover Fazeel (Latheef) visits her to the island but Ziyan forces her to get rid of him. Ziyan returns the cheque to Shaina and reveals his intention to start a romantic relationship with her. He convinced his love for her and Shaina accepted his proposal.

== Cast ==
- Niuma Mohamed as Shaina
- Ravee Farooq as Ziyan
- Lufshan Shakeeb as Yoosuf
- Aishath Siyadha as Rauna
- Ahmed Nimal as Zahid
- Fauziyya Hassan as Shaina's mother
- Latheef as Fazeel
- Hussain Nooradeen as Island Chief
- Aminath Shareef as Zahid's first wife (Special appearance)
- Nashidha Mohamed as Zahid's mistress (Special appearance)

== Soundtrack ==
Track listing
No.	Title	Lyrics	Singer(s)	Length
1.	"Aadhey Araamu Edhemey"	Adam Haleem Adnan	Fazeela Amir
2.	"Asthaa Asthaa"	Adam Haleem Adnan	Hussain Ali, Lahfa Faiz
3.	"Shikaayathekey"	Adam Haleem Adnan	Hussain Ali
4.	"Dhaashey Yaaraa"	Adam Haleem Adnan	Mumthaz Moosa, Fazeela Amir

== Accolades ==
Year	Award	Category	Recipients	Result	Ref.
2007	1st Miadhu Crystal Awards	Best Choreography	Ravee Farooq for "Asthaa Asthaa"	Won	
2008	5th Gaumee Film Awards	Best Actor	Ravee Farooq	Nominated	
2008	5th Gaumee Film Awards	Best Actress	Niuma Mohamed	Nominated	
2008	5th Gaumee Film Awards	Best Supporting Actor	Lufshan Shakeeb	Nominated	
2008	5th Gaumee Film Awards	Best Male Playback Singer	Hussain Ali - "Shikaayathekey"	Won	
2008	5th Gaumee Film Awards	Best Choreography	Ravee Farooq	Nominated	
