= Sitee =

- Official film poster
- Directed by: Ahmed Nimal
- Written by: Ahmed Nimal
- Screenplay by: Ahmed Nimal
- Produced by: Aslam Rasheed
- Starring: Ahmed Nimal; Fathimath Rameeza
- Cinematography: Abdulla Jameel
- Edited by: Ahmed Mohamed Didi
- Production companies: Slam Studio; Kid Productions
- Release date: 1993
- Country: Maldives
- Language: Dhivehi

Sitee is a 1993 Maldivian drama film written and directed by Ahmed Nimal. Produced by Aslam Rasheed under Slam Studio in association with Kid Productions, the film stars Nimal and Fathimath Rameeza in pivotal roles.

The film is based on true incidents that occurred to a friend of Ahmed Nimal. Filming was completed in one month while shooting for the songs was extended for another month. The song "Mulhi Jaan Hithaa" is shot in five different islands from five atolls.

== Plot ==
Hameed (Ahmed Nimal), a fisherman, relocates to Malé hunting for jobs when his poor mother, Naseema (Arifa Ibrahim), dies. He is taken in as a servant by a reputed family where he starts an affair with their only child, Shadhiya (Fathimath Rameeza). When their affair is exposed to her father, he expels Hameed from their house where he is then accompanied by Chilhiya Moosa Manik, witnessing his honesty in a prior meeting and treats Hameed as his own child.

== Cast ==
- Ahmed Nimal as Hameed
- Fathimath Rameeza as Shadhiya
- Chilhiya Moosa Manik
- Abdul Raheem
- Ahmed Shareef
- Ibrahim Shakir as Adam
- Suhail
- Hassan Haleem
- Mohamed Riyaz
- Arifa Ibrahim as Naseema
- Suneetha
- Aishath Hanim

== Soundtrack ==
Track listing
No.	Title	Lyrics	Singer(s)	Length
1.	"Khiyaalugaa Vamey"	Mariyam Waheedha	Mariyam Waheedha
2.	"Mulhi Jaan Hithaa"	Easa Shareef	Mohamed Huzam
3.	"Veeme Haalugai Ma Roan"		Ahmed Mohamed Didi
4.	"Thimaage Amilla Faidhaa"		Ahmed Mohamed Didi

== Accolades ==
Year	Award	Category	Recipient(s)	Result	Ref(s)
1994	Aafathis Awards – 1993	Best Film	Aslam Rasheedh (Sitee)	Won	
1994	Aafathis Awards – 1993	Best Actress	Fathimath Rameeza	Won	
1994	Aafathis Awards – 1993	Best Director	Ahmed Nimal	Nominated	
1994	Aafathis Awards – 1993	Best Actor	Ahmed Nimal	Nominated	
