= Ossunu Iraaeku =

- Official film poster
- Directed by: Ahmed Nimal
- Written by: Moosa Latheef
- Produced by: Ahmed Ashraf
- Starring: Yoosuf Shafeeu; Mariyam Afeefa; Ahmed Nimal; Aminath Shareef
- Cinematography: Ibrahim Moosa
- Edited by: Mohamed Afrah
- Music by: Ibrahim Nifar
- Production company: ASH Productions
- Release date: April 11, 2007
- Running time: 46 minutes
- Country: Maldives
- Language: Dhivehi

Ossunu Iraaeku (trans with the setting sun) is a 2007 Maldivian short film directed by Ahmed Nimal. The film stars Yoosuf Shafeeu as a school teacher who starts a romantic relationship with a reserved girl, played by Mariyam Afeefa who is the only daughter of an over-protective and abusive father, played by Ahmed Nimal. Aminath Shareef, Arifa Ibrahim and Ali Riyaz played supporting roles in the film. The film was released on 11 April 2007 to positive reviews and received five awards from 2nd Miadhu Crystal Award ceremony.

== Premise ==
Farish returns to the Maldives following three years of studying abroad. The Education Ministry assigns him a teaching position on a nearby island. Eager to learn about the island's unique characteristics, Farish asks the locals, who inform him that the women on the island claim to have sightings of a Jinn in a red dress, piquing his interest. Later that same night, Mariyam pays him a visit who is introduced by one of Farish's friends as a single woman known for being hard to pursue. Much to Farish's surprise, Mariyam openly confesses her love for him, explaining that she was drawn to him from the moment she saw him at the beach. She also discloses that his father disapproves of their relationship.

Despite her father's disapproval, Mariyam and Farish embark on a romantic relationship. Farish holds the belief that Mariyam may have psychological issues. One night, Javid, a young man claimed to be Mariyam's ex-boyfriend, advises Farish to distance himself from Mariyam, as her father, Dhon Ahammad is not one to easily let things go. Farish adds to this narrative, stating that Dhon Ahammad plans to marry Mariyam off to a boy named Shameem from a wealthy family currently studying in Malaysia. Shortly thereafter, an unknown man, whom Farish suspects to be Dhon Ahammad, attacks him in a manner consistent with what Javid had previously described. Following this incident, Mariyam vanishes from Farish's life.

Eight months later, Dhon Ahammad is discovered deceased near the seashore. It is then disclosed that Farish was assaulted by none other than Dhon Ahammad himself, who was incensed by the news of Mariyam's pregnancy. Dhon Ahammad wrongly assumed the father of the child to be Farish, while in fact it is Dhon Ahammad who has been sexually abusing Mariyam since she is twelve years. In fear of the truth being exposed, Dhon Ahammad and his helpless wife distanced themselves from the islanders and prevented any other man from approaching Mariyam. When Mariyam eventually gave birth, Dhon Ahammad forcibly took the child from her and tragically ended the infant's life by throwing it into the sea on a stormy night. Enraged by this horrific act, Mariyam's mother, Aminath, took justice into her own hands, killing her husband and disposing of his body in the ocean.

Through Mariyam's maternal grandmother, Farish discovers that Dhon Ahammad is actually Mariyam's stepfather. Aminath had married him when she became pregnant by another man, using the marriage to conceal the truth of her pregnancy. While the islanders had believed these events were the actions of a Jinn, in reality, they were the result of the cowardly actions of a perverted man.

== Cast ==
- Yoosuf Shafeeu as Farish
- Mariyam Afeefa as Mariyam
- Ahmed Nimal as Dhon Ahammad; Mariyam's father
- Arifa Ibrahim as Mariyam's grandmother
- Aminath Shareef as Aminath; Mariyam's mother
- Ali Riyaz as Javid; Mariyam's ex-boyfriend
- Shifau as Farish's friend
- Andy as Farish's friend
- Azeeza as Hawwa

== Soundtrack ==
Track listing
No.	Title	Singer(s)	Length
1.	"Iru Ossumun"	Mohamed Abdul Ghanee	5:35

== Response ==
The film was released on 11 April 2007 to positive reviews from the critics; Moosa Latheef's attempt to deliver a social message through this film was particularly praised, while the performance of the lead including Yoosuf Shafeeu, Mariyam Afeefa and Ahmed Nimal were commended as praiseworthy.

== Accolades ==
Year	Award	Category	Nominated work	Result	Ref(s)
2008	2nd Miadhu Crystal Award	Best Film	Ossunu Iraaeku	Won	
2008	2nd Miadhu Crystal Award	Best Story	Moosa Latheef	Won	
2008	2nd Miadhu Crystal Award	Best Background Music	Ibrahim Nifar	Won	
2008	2nd Miadhu Crystal Award	Best Cinematography	Ibrahim Moosa	Won	
2008	2nd Miadhu Crystal Award	Best Villain	Ahmed Nimal	Won	
