= Ahmed Nimal =

Maldivian actor, director, writer and producer (1963–2026)

- އަޙްމަދު ނިމާލް
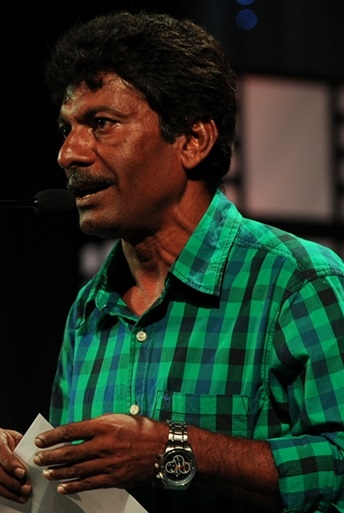
- Nimal at 3rd Maldives Film Awards, 2014
- Born: January 13, 1963; Sultanate of the Maldive Islands
- Died: 26 February 2026 (aged 62)
- Occupations: Actor, director, editor, producer, writer
- Years active: 1984–2026
- Children: Mohamed Jumayyil

Ahmed Nimal (Dhivehi: އަޙްމަދު ނިމާލް; 1963 – 26 February 2026) was a Maldivian actor, director, editor, writer and producer.

== Early life ==
Prior to acting in films, Nimal worked at Maldives Meteorological Service office. His interest in films and acting grew due to the influence of his colleagues including Easa Shareef and other friends who actively took part in theatre plays.

== Career ==
Nimal made his career debut with Nufoozu (1984), an initiation by Shareef and his colleagues. Initially assigned to work behind the camera, Shareef requested he star in the lead role of the film due to a date conflict of the original actor who had been offered the role first. Afterwards, he started working as a full-time actor and led an organization "Dhivehi Harakaaiy Jamiyya" along with Shareef.

In 1993, Nimal wrote and directed his most successful release, a drama film, Sitee starring opposite his wife, Fathimath Rameeza. Based on true incidents which occurred with a friend, the film focuses on a fisherman who later turns to be a successful businessman and his search for his father. The film and the song "Mulhi Jaan Hithaa" are considered to be his most "dedicated work in his career" since the latter took a month to be filmed while shot in five different islands from five atolls.

In 2000, Nimal acted and directed the year's most successful Maldivian film, a horror classic Zalzalaa (2000) featuring Niuma Mohamed, Ibrahim Wisan and Ali Shameel in pivotal roles. The film follows a man who lost his life and endangered his whole family while being lured by a female spirit sent off to complete an unfulfilled prophecy. The following year, he worked in Aishath Ali Manik's Hiiy Edhenee (2001) which was an unofficial remake of Dharmesh Darshan's romantic film Dhadkan (2000) starring Akshay Kumar, Suniel Shetty and Shilpa Shetty in the lead role. Cast opposite Ali Seezan and Sheela Najeeb, he played the role of an influential and cunning stepfather. His next directorial venture was the film Sababu starring opposite Ibrahim Giyas and Aishath Shiranee in which he played the fiancé who sacrificed his love for the sake of his friend's happiness.

In 2005, Nimal starred alongside Niuma Mohamed, Ali Seezan and Sheereen Abdul Wahid in his horror film Handhu Keytha (2005) which unfolds the story of a man who was enchanted by a spirit while witnessing a lunar eclipse. In the film, he played the spell-maker trying to save his crush from the evil spirit.

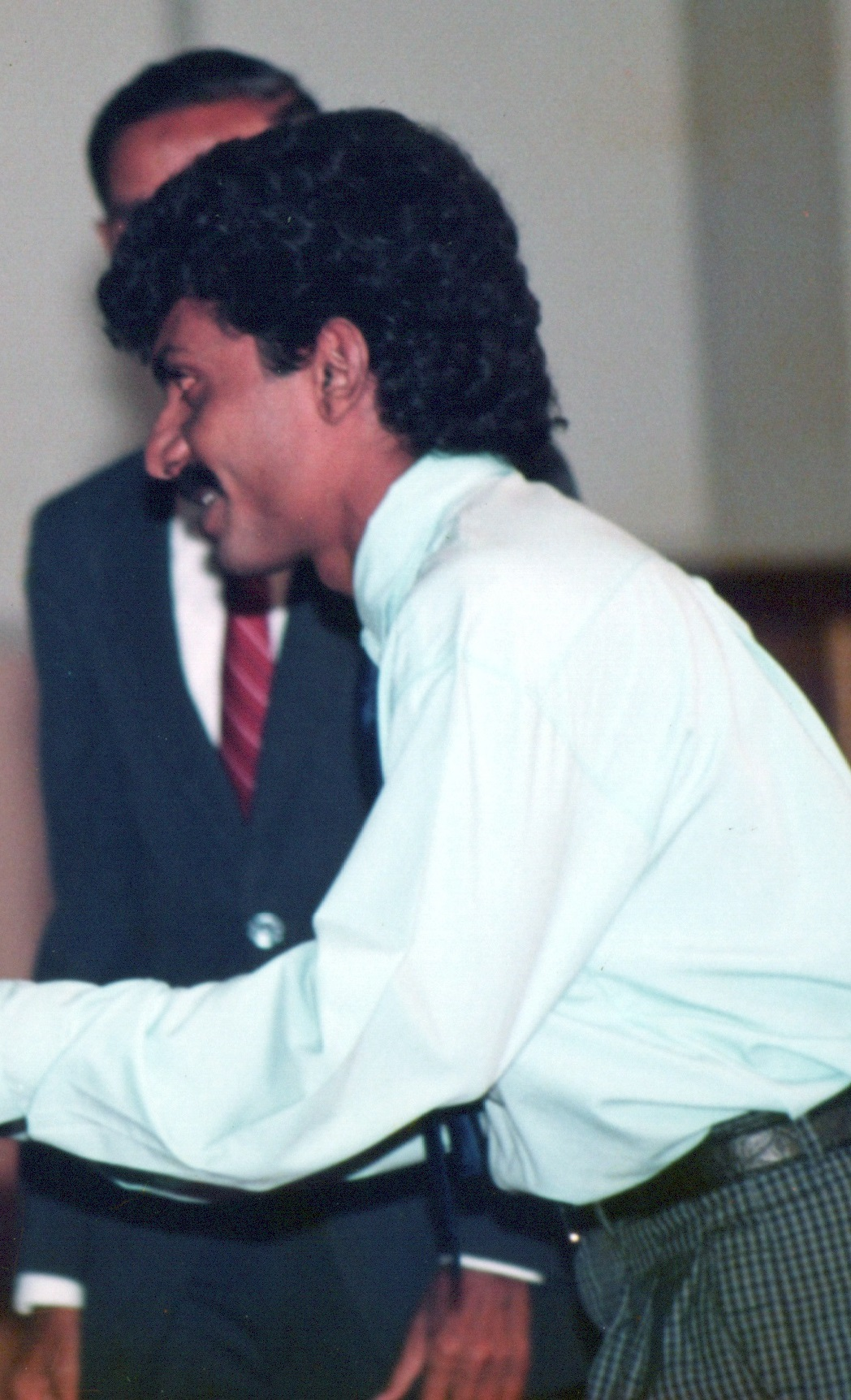
Mohamed receiving the National Award of Recognition, 1991

In April 2006, his revenge thriller film, Hiyani was released which featured him as the traitorous husband, whose life turns into a mess due to his frauds. The film which primarily focuses on a wealthy troublesome couple whose possessions have been exposed by the disappearance of the husband, was mostly received positively by the critics. He next released a romantic film Vaaloabi Engeynama (2006), starring Yoosuf Shafeeu, Mariyam Afeefa, Fathimath Fareela and Fauziyya Hassan in pivotal roles, was a critical and commercial success, considered to be the most successful Maldivian release of the year. The film follows a conflicted husband struggling to convey equal affection towards his two spouses. His work in the film garnered him a Gaumee Film Award as the Best Director, simultaneously winning the Best Film Award.

His erotic horror thriller Khalaas was released in 2008 which follows a newly married couple who relocate themselves to Sri Lanka. Starring alongside Ali Seezan, Mariyam Afeefa and Nadhiya Hassan, Nimal played the role of Ismail, a friend of a perfidious husband who is unwillingly seduced by woman. The film received mixed reviews from critics, specific appraisal being subjected to its bold and erotic theme. He next appeared as the unsympathetic father in Fathimath Nahula's romantic drama film, Yoosuf which depicts the story of a deaf and mute man (played by Yoosuf Shafeeu) who has been mistreated by a wealthy family, mocking his disability. Featuring an ensemble cast including Yoosuf Shafeeu, Niuma Mohamed, Mohamed Manik, Mohamed Manik, Fauziyya Hassan, Ravee Farooq, Zeenath Abbas and Ahmed Lais Asim, the film is considered to include most prominent faces in a Maldivian film. Initially, Nimal was assigned to direct the film, however Nahula replaced him as the director since his role in the film was expanded and "his sole focus needs to be put into his performance". The film received widespread critical acclaim and was attained a blockbuster status at box office. A total of forty-five full-house shows were screened at Olympus Cinema before the film was leaked online, however the producers were able to screen five more shows at the cinema making it one of the all-time highest-grossing Maldivian movies. The film was the Maldivian official entry at 2009 SAARC Film Festivals and held the privilege of being the opening movie of the festival. His performance earned him a Gaumee Film Award nomination for Best Supporting Actor.

Nimal played the deceitful friend in the family drama film E Dharifulhu (2009) which was directed by himself and featured an ensemble cast including Niuma Mohamed, Yoosuf Shafeeu, Mohamed Manik and Sheela Najeeb. At the 1st Maldives Film Awards, Nimal received his first nomination as Best Director for his work in the film. Another release of the year, Loaiybahtakaa (2009), written and directed by Yoosuf Shafeeu stars him as a notable businessman who struggles to welcome his illegitimate son into his family. The romantic drama, co-starring Yoosuf Shafeeu, Fathimath Fareela and Mohamed Faisal, tells the story of unrequited love, and proved to be a commercial success.

Nimal's first release of 2010 was a special appearance in Ali Shifau's family drama Dhin Veynuge Hithaamaigaa where he played and unnamed character who informs Dr. Nahees, played by Mohamed Manik about his wife's maternal death. The film showcases discrimination against the islanders, family revenge and fatherhood responsibilities. Being able to screen fifteen full-house shows of the film, it was declared to be a commercial success. He next starred in the horror film Zalzalaa En'buri Aun (2010) which was edited, written, produced and directed by himself. It was a spin-off to Aslam Rasheed's horror classic film Zalzalaa (2000) starring, Ibrahim Wisan, Ali Shameel and Niuma Mohamed. The film revolves around a mariage blanc, a murder of husband by his wife with secret lover and avenging of his death from everyone involved in the crime. He played the role Mohamed, father of an avaricious girl who kills her husband with the help of her secret lover. The film received mixed response from critics and it did average business at box office. At the 6th Gaumee Film Awards he received a nomination for Best Director, Best Editing, Best Sound Mixing and Best Art Direction for his work in the film.

Later in 2010, Nimal appeared in a small role in Veeraana as a government official who witness the confess of a murderer. Directed by Yoosuf Shafeeu, it deals with child sexual abuse. The film received mixed to positive reviews from critics; praising the writer and director for touching a condemnatory topic though criticizing its "over-the-top melodrama". Having a strong buzz prior its release, the film was proved to be a commercial success. He next reunited with Niuma Mohamed in his horror film The Three, which received negative reviews from critics and was declared to be a box office disaster. The duo next collaborated in Niuma Mohamed's directorial debut drama film Niuma (2010) alongside an ensemble cast including Mohamed, Yoosuf Shafeeu, Sheela Najeeb, Mohamed Manik, Aminath Rasheedha and Abdulla Muaz. He played the cruel father who sexually abuses his own daughter. He considered his role to be the most inhumane role he has portrayed so far. Upon release, the film was met with widespread critical acclaim specifically complimenting the performance of actors and its dialogues. Being able to screen over thirty full-house shows of the film, it was declared a Mega-Hit at box office, and the highest grossing Maldivian release of the year. The film fetched him a Best Actor nomination at both, 2nd Maldives Film Awards and 6th Gaumee Film Awards.

In 2012, Nimal played a rich father in Ravee Farooq-directed romantic drama film Mihashin Furaana Dhandhen alongside Niuma Mohamed, Mohamed Manik and Ali Seezan. Upon release, the film received mixed response from critics while his performance was recognised positively. Ahmed Nadheem of Haveeru noted the film as "the best Maldivian melodramatic film" he had seen in the past two years, though displeased with its similarities between two Bollywood films. His portrayal of Asim in the film resulted in a Gaumee Film Award nomination for Best Supporting Actor.

In 2013, Nimal featured in Ali Shifau-directed horror film Fathis Handhuvaruge Feshun 3D which serves as a prequel to Fathis Handhuvaru (1997) starring Reeko Moosa Manik and Niuma Mohamed in lead roles. It was based on a story by Ibrahim Waheed, Jinaa: Fathis Handhuvaruge Feshun (2009), which itself is a prequel to the story Fathishandhuvaru (1996) written by himself which was later adapted to a film by same name in 1997. The film was marketed as being the first 3D release for a Maldivian film and the first release derived from spin-off. He played the role of Naseem, a spell maker. Upon release the film received generally negative reviews from critics. Ahmed Nadheem from Haveeru Daily wrote: "Nimal stands on top of the supporting cast playing a hungry man doing spells".

Mohamed Aboobakuru-directed Randhari was Nimal's only release of 2015. His portrayal of the character Razzaq, a ruthless father, along with the film received negative reviews from critics and did below average business at the box office. The following year, he directed and starred in the horror film E Re'ah Fahu (2016). Upon release, the film received negative response from critics and was declared a flop. His next appearance was Hussain Munawwar's Neyngi Yaaru Vakivee alongside Ahmed Azmeel and Aminath Rishfa. Critics panned the film and labelled his performance as "boring" while criticising the character development. Despite the negative reviews, the film did an average business at the end of its run.

In 2023, Nimal played the role of a wealthy husband in Ali Seezan's erotic thriller Loabi Vevijje, which follows a married man who becomes infatuated with a woman after a one-night stand. The film which was announced in 2019, but halted due to COVID-19 pandemic, opened to generally positive reviews from critics, where as his performance received mixed reviews from critics. Aminath Luba reviewing from The Press found his performance to be "strictly average, nothing exceptional". Similarly, Ahmed Nadheem from Dhauru called his acting "not bad" and "generally okay".

== Personal life and death ==
Nimal met actress Fathimath Rameeza during the filming of Maqsadhu (1987) although their romantic relationship started while shooting for the film Shakku (1988).

On 31 December 2025, he suffered a stroke that led to his death on 26 February 2026. He was 62.

== Filmography ==
Key
†	Denotes films that have not yet been released

=== Feature film ===
Year	Title	Role	Notes	Ref(s)
1984	Nufoozu			
1987	Maqsadhu			
1988	Shakku	Sameer / Zameer	Also the director	
1993	Sitee	Hameed	Also the writer and director	
1993	Udhaas	Kaleem	Also the writer and director	
1999	Sababu	Niyaz	Also the director	
2000	Rihun	Athif	Special appearance	
2000	Zalzalaa	Adam	Also the director and editor	
2001	Hiiy Edhenee	Vishal's stepfather		
2001	Hilihilaa	Abdul Azeez	Also the director and writer	
2004	Hama Himeyn	Habeeb	Also the director	
2005	Handhu Keytha	Hameed	Also the director and editor	
2006	Hiyani	Zahid	Also the director and writer	
2006	Vaaloabi Engeynama	Director	Also the director Gaumee Film Award for Best Director; Special appearance	
2008	Khalaas	Ismail	Also the director	
2008	Yoosuf	Yasir	Nominated—Gaumee Film Award for Best Supporting Actor	
2009	E Dharifulhu	Ahsan	Also the director Nominated—Maldives Film Award for Best Director	
2009	Loaiybahtakaa	Majid		
2010	Dhin Veynuge Hithaamaigaa	Doctor	Special appearance	
2010	Zalzalaa En'buri Aun	Mohamed	Also the producer and director Nominated—Gaumee Film Award for Best Director	
2010	Veeraana	Government official	Special appearance	
2010	Niuma	Nizar	Nominated—Gaumee Film Award for Best Actor; Nominated—Best Actor	
2012	Mihashin Furaana Dhandhen	Asim	Nominated—Gaumee Film Award for Best Supporting Actor	
2013	Fathis Handhuvaruge Feshun 3D	Naseem		
2014	Raanee	Adam Manik		
2015	Randhari	Razzaq		
2016	E Re'ah Fahu	Razzaq	Also the director and co-editor	
2016	Neyngi Yaaru Vakivee	Abdul Zaki	Also the editor	
2017	Ill Noise	Dr. Ahmed Nimal		
2019	Leena	Khalid		
2022	Hehes	Raqeeb	Also the director	
2023	Loabi Vevijje	Jaufar		
2023	Jokaru	Sarudhar		
2024	Saaya			
2025	Kan'bulo	Rauf		
2025	Ilzaam	Shiyam		
2025	Koss Gina Mistake	Hashim		
2025	Lily	Zahir		
2026	Dhevi		Special appearance	

=== Television ===
Year	Title	Role	Notes	Ref(s)
—N/a	Huvani			
1991–1992	Salhi Baisaa	Ali	Main role; 8 episodes	
2006	Vaguthu Faaithu Nuvanees	Shareef	Guest role; 1 episode	
2006–2008	Hinithun Velaashey Kalaa	Waheed	Main role; 14 episodes	
2007–2008	Vimlaa	Haneef		
2012	Dhirumeh Nethas	Azma's father	Recurring role; 5 episodes	
2013	Vaudhey Mee	Shakir	Main role; 10 episodes	
2016	Bithufangi 2			
2022–2023	Lafuzu	Ali Shareef "Alibe"	Also the director Recurring role; 32 episodes	
2022	Balgish	Farooq Hassan	Also the director Main role; 5 episodes	
2023	Hayyaru	Juneydh	Main role; 15 episodes	
2024	Vihaali	Bakuru	Main role in the segment "Khadheeja"	

=== Short film ===
Year	Title	Role	Notes	Ref(s)
2005	Falhi Sikunthu 2	Ziyazor		
2006	Dheke Dhekeves 4	Doctor	Special appearance	
2007	Ossunu Iraaeku	Dhon Ahammad	Also the director	
2007	Paneeno	Hassan Manik	Co-director and co-writer	
2007	Fahu Sofha	Nazim's father	Also the director	
2007	Kudafoolhaai Paree Dhahtha	Generous man	Special appearance	
2008	Umurah Salaam	Nafeesa's father	Also the director and screen-writer	
2010	Loabeege Ninja	Muhusin	Also the director	
2010	Muhammaage Briefcase	Abdul Satthar	Also the director	
2010	The Tree		Also the director	
2012	Mammaa Ey	Umairu	Also the director	

=== Other work ===
Year	Title	Director	Screenplay	Editor	Notes	Ref(s)
2000	Shaalinee		Yes		Feature film	
2006	Mohamma Kalo V/S Bao Kalo	Yes			Short film	
2006	Kudafoolhuge Vasvaas	Yes			Short film	
2006	Dheke Dhekeves 3	Yes			Short film	
2006	Dheke Dhekeves 4	Yes			Short film	
2007	Ossunu Iraaeku...	Yes			Short film	
2010	Sirrun Hithaa Kulhelaafa	Yes			Television series; 10 episodes	
2012	Kidnap	Yes	Yes	Yes	Short film	
2012	Mammaa Ey	Yes			Short film	
2012	24 Gadi Iru			Yes	Feature film	
2014	Aniyaa	Yes	Yes	Yes	Feature film	
2017	Bandharu			Yes	Office drama	
2022–2026	Lafuzu	Yes			Web series; 30 episodes	
2022	Hehes	Yes			Feature film	
2025	Kan'bulo			Yes	Feature film	
2025	Ilzaam			Yes	Feature film	

== Discography ==
Year	Album/Film	Song	Lyricist(s)	Co-Artist(s)
1997	Eheege Adu	"Hairaan Veehey"	Easa Shareef	Shifa Thaufeeq
2000	Namaves	"Loa Meridhaaney"	Easa Shareef	Shifa Thaufeeq
2017	Naughty 40	"Thedhey Anbin"	Adam Haleem Adnan	Solo
2023	Loabi Vevijje	"Loabi Vevijje" (Promo song)	Mohamed Abdul Ghanee	Abdullah Shafiu Ibrahim, Ali Seezan, Ahmed Easa, Ali Azim, Mariyam Azza, Aminath Rishfa, Irufana Ibrahim

== Accolades ==
Year	Award	Category	Nominated work	Result	Ref(s)
1991	National Award of Recognition	Performing Arts – Theatre performance		Won	
2008	2nd Miadhu Crystal Award	Best Villain – Short film	Ossunu Iraaeku	Won	
2008	5th Gaumee Film Awards	Best Director	Vaaloabi Engeynama	Won	
2010	Maldives Video Music Awards	Best Video Song Direction	"Bikahaalu"	Won	
2011	1st Maldives Film Awards	Best Director	E Dharifulhu	Nominated	
2012	2nd Maldives Film Awards	Best Actor	Niuma	Nominated	
2014	3rd Maldives Film Awards	Best Supporting Actor	Mihashin Furaana Dhandhen	Nominated	
2015	6th Gaumee Film Awards	Best Director	Zalzalaa En'buri Aun	Nominated	
2015	6th Gaumee Film Awards	Best Actor	Niuma	Nominated	
2015	6th Gaumee Film Awards	Best Supporting Actor	Yoosuf	Nominated	
2015	6th Gaumee Film Awards	Best Editing	Zalzalaa En'buri Aun	Nominated	
2015	6th Gaumee Film Awards	Best Sound Mixing	Zalzalaa En'buri Aun (shared with Ayyuman Shareef)	Nominated	
2015	6th Gaumee Film Awards	Best Art Direction	Zalzalaa En'buri Aun	Nominated	
2016	7th Gaumee Film Awards	Best Supporting Actor	Mihashin Furaana Dhandhen	Nominated	
2017	8th Gaumee Film Awards	Best Screenplay	Aniyaa	Nominated	
2017	8th Gaumee Film Awards	Best Sound Mixing	Aniyaa (shared with Ayyuman Shareef)	Nominated	
2023	NKFA Bangkok International Film Festival – 2023	Outstanding Contribution for Maldives Film Industry		Won	
