= Mohamed Rashad =

Maldivian singer (1952–2002)

- Born: 1952; Male', Maldives
- Died: 2002 (aged 50)
- Occupation: Playback singer
- Children: 8
- Musical career
- Genres: Pop; filmi; electronic
- Instrument: Vocals

Mohamed Rashad (1952 – 2002) also referred as Madhaha Rashad was a Maldivian singer.

== Early life and career ==
Rashad was born in 1952 in Male'. His father, Qasim Hussain was famously known for locals as "Naivaadhoo Kasim" and "Reendhoo Kasim". His mother, Hawwa Idhurees was a homemaker. He had one brother as a sibling and ten others as half-siblings including notable local artists, Ali Rameez, Ibrahim Rameez and Rafiyath Rameeza. At a very young age, persuaded by his "undying love for music", Rashad was accompanied by the music group "Maafannu Fiyaathoshi Club" to lift and transport their music instruments. On one such occasion, he had performed a song as a replacement for one of the singers in his absence. It was then his talent was identified and appreciated among the audience and he became a vocal performer of the group. Afterwards, he started collaborating with other music groups too. Music critics noted that his voice resembles that of Indian singer Talat Mahmood. In 1996, the Government of Maldives honoured him with the National Award of Recognition.

Rashad became the most prominent and frequently collaborated voice in performing "Madhaha" for Dhivehi Raajjeyge Adu, after the Friday prayer and during the Ramazan breakfast hours. Critics praising his singing skills noted that "Rashad is one of the few singers who actually knows the technicality of singing". "Feenaashey Jehunee" from the film Edhi Edhi Hoadheemey (2002) was the last released song of him which was well received by the audience and critics. Apart from singing, Rashad played instruments including keyboard, Harmonia and guitar, as educated under the close instruction from Abdul Raheem and Mohamed Shiham. He also studies voice training and taught the skill to interested singers and students performing in inter-school singing competition. Rashad had eight children and six grandchildren before his demise. To honor his contribution to the music industry, Television Maldives dedicated one episode of the Ehan'dhaanugai series to Rashad, where his youngest child, Hassan Jalaal performed in the show.

== Discography ==
=== Feature film ===
| Year | Film | Song | Lyricist(s) | Co-artist(s) | Notes |
|---|---|---|---|---|---|
| 1993 | Gudhurathuge Niyaa | "Foariyaa Ekugaa Dheken Thiya Aee" | Ahmed Sharumeel | Aishath Inaya | |
| 1993 | Gudhurathuge Niyaa | "Natheeja Balaanee" | Ahmed Sharumeel | Aishath Inaya | |
| 1993 | Gudhurathuge Niyaa | "Annaashe Loabin Noora" (Male version) | Ahmed Sharumeel | Solo | |
| 1993 | Beyvafaa | "Adhu Hithuga Hin'gaa Thiya Khiyaal" | | Aathifa Aboobakuru | |
| 1993 | Imthihaan | "Ramzuvi Kulavaru Araa Maley" | | Sofa Thaufeeq | |
| 1993 | Imthihaan | "Dhin Thaazaa Dheewaanaavee Asaru" | | Sofa Thaufeeq | |
| 1994 | Dheriyaa | "Magey Shaanu Velee" | Abdulla Sodhiq | Fazeela Amir | |
| 1994 | Dheriyaa | "Magey Loabi Dharifulhaa" | Abdulla Sodhiq | Fazeela Amir | |
| 1994 | Dheriyaa | "Foni Kaathakethi" | Abdulla Afeef | Aminath Shiham | |
| 1995 | Dhushman | "Jaree Dhuniyeyge Aniyaigaa" | | Solo | |
| 1995 | Dhushman | "Raha Aruga Lee Mi Zaharun" | | Solo | |
| 1995 | Dhushman | "Naseebu Vee Hithi Hithaama Libifaa" | | Solo | |
| 1996 | Lheedharifulhu | "Dhen Othee Hoadhumey" | Easa Shareef | Shifa Thaufeeq | |
| 1996 | Badhal | "Ge Ekey Nikan Reethi" | | Solo | |
| 1996 | Badhal | "Nulibey Ufaa Hoadhan" | | Solo | |
| 1997 | Loabeega Aniyaa | "Dheyshey Mithuraa" | Tharaboozu Ahmed Riza | Solo | |
| 1997 | Loabeega Aniyaa | "Reyrey Mithuraa" | Tharaboozu Ahmed Riza | Shifa Thaufeeq | |
| 1997 | Laila | "Hithuga Ma Leemey Fari Hin'gumeh" | Ahmed Sharumeel | Solo | Appears in Soundtrack album |
| 1997 | Dhefirin | "Dhulakee Fisaari Thoonu" | | Fathimath Zoona | |
| 1997 | Dhefirin | "Fusvey Fusvey" | | Solo | |
| 1998 | Kuhveriya | "Dhanveemaahey" | | Solo | |
| 1998 | Olhunuvi Hiyy | "Yaaraage Thiya Farikan" | Tharaboozu Ahmed Riza | Solo | |
| 1998 | Olhunuvi Hiyy | "Neyngey Dhushman" | Tharaboozu Ahmed Riza | Solo | |
| 1998 | Mila Handhuvaru | "Dhen Othee Hoadhumey" | Easa Shareef | Shifa Thaufeeq | |
| 1999 | Nuruhunvi Loabi | "Dhenhey Seedhaa Saaf Javaabey" | Ahmed Sharumeel | Zahiyya Thaufeeq | |
| 1999 | Nuruhunvi Loabi | "Hithugaa An'dhan Feshi Loabi" | Ahmed Sharumeel | Zahiyya Thaufeeq | |
| 1999 | Sababu | "Hithah Loabi Vevuneemaa" | Mariyam Waheedha | Mariyam Waheedha | |
| 1999 | Sababu | "Mi Qudhurathee Manaazirah" | Mariyam Waheedha | Mariyam Waheedha | |
| 1999 | Sababu | "Loabi Gellumun Meyaa" | Mariyam Waheedha | Solo | |
| 2001 | Edhi Edhi Hoadheemey | "Feenaashey Jehunee" | Kopee Mohamed Rasheedh | Solo | |
| 2001 | Edhi Edhi Hoadheemey | "Farudhaa Kehunee" | Kopee Mohamed Rasheedh | Solo | |

=== Television ===
| Year | Film | Song | Lyricist(s) | Co-artist(s) |
|---|---|---|---|---|
| 1998 | Kulheybeybe | "Hithuga Ma Leemey Fari Hin'gumeh" | Ahmed Sharumeel | Solo |

=== Non-film songs ===
| Year | Film | Song | Lyricist(s) | Co-artist(s) |
|---|---|---|---|---|
| N/A | N/A | "Vaathee Han'dhaaney Mee Shikuvaa" | | Jameela Hassan |
| N/A | N/A | "Kureegaa Oiy Goiy Ninmaalamey" | | Jameela Hassan |
| N/A | N/A | "Nan Dhillaalee" | | Jameela Hassan |
| N/A | N/A | "Dhiruvaashe Vaanee" | | |
| N/A | N/A | "Fenna Mathivaru Dhaane Kashavaru" | | |
| N/A | N/A | "Han'dhaaney Aavee" | | |
| N/A | N/A | "Karunain Foodhey Hithaa Mey" | | |
| N/A | N/A | "Kuraa Saafu Loabin" | | |
| N/A | N/A | "Loabeege Thiya Fasaanaa" | | |
| N/A | N/A | "Loabi Hithugaa Aakuraathee" | | |
| N/A | N/A | "Loabin Roifa Buneemey Aadhey" | | |
| N/A | N/A | "Mee Dhuniyeyge Enme Chaalu" | | |
| N/A | N/A | "Meethoa Khiyaaley Ai Zamaanee" | | |
| N/A | N/A | "Mithuraa Loabin" | | |
| N/A | N/A | "Mulhi Zinmathey" | | |
| N/A | N/A | "Nethey Feshuneehsuren Dhekefaa" | | |
| N/A | N/A | "Roohaa Gulhey Kuruvaa Han'dhaan" | | |
| N/A | N/A | "Ummeedhun Furi Bimugaa" | | |
| N/A | N/A | "Vasmeeru Maamelaa" | | |
| N/A | N/A | "Veynaa Hoonaa Dhey Zamaan" | | |
| N/A | N/A | "Veynee Hithaama Hithugaa" | | |
| N/A | D.I.B - 1 | "Hithugaa Eki Reyrey" | | Solo |
| N/A | D.I.B - 1 | "Thanthan Mi Balan" | | Solo |
| N/A | D.I.B - 1 | "Ai Mausam Ran Reethi Zamaan" | | Mahumoodha Shakeeb |
| 1991 | Bahaaru Moosum | "Neyngi Sirrun Kalaa" | Easa Shareef | Solo |
| 1991 | Bahaaru Moosum | "Ehsaas Vanee Loabin Eki Varu" | | Solo |
| 1991 | Bahaaru Moosum | "Adhu Loabeegaa Dhakkaalaa" | | Solo |
| 1991 | Bahaaru Moosum | "Noonthoa Themuney Baaru Vayaa" | | Solo |
| 1991 | Bahaaru Moosum | "Husnuvey Karuna Lolun" | | Solo |
| 1991 | Bahaaru Moosum | "Noolheyshe Mihaa Dhurugaa" | | Solo |
| 1991 | Bahaaru Moosum | "Hureema Balamey Veythoa Hissaa" | | Solo |
| 1992 | 4 Hand 4 | "Moosumey Bahaarey Mee Ufaa" | Ibrahim Didi | Aishath Inaya |
| 1992 | 4 Hand 4 | "Asaru Meyge Vindhaa" | Ibrahim Didi | Aishath Inaya |
| 1992 | 4 Hand 4 | "Dhin Saafuvi Han'dhuvarugaa" | Ibrahim Didi | Solo |
| 1992 | 4 Hand 5 | "Zamaan Zamaan Dhen Magey" | | Aathifa Aboobakuru |
| 1992 | 4 Hand 5 | "Dhey Ithubaaru Foni Iquraaru" | | Aathifa Aboobakuru |
| 1992 | 4 Hand 5 | "Hoadhaa Mi Malakee" | | Aathifa Aboobakuru |
| 1992 | 4 Hand 5 | "Adhu Hithuga Hin'gaa Thiya Khiyaal" | | Aathifa Aboobakuru |
| 1992 | 4 Hand 5 | "Dhanee Dhanee Visnaa Ufalun" | | Aathifa Aboobakuru |
| 1992 | 4 Hand 5 | "Nuvey Mi Gulshange Roalhi Aumeh" | | Aishath Inaya |
| 1992 | 4 Hand 5 | "Aniyaa Mi Dheyhaa Zaathakee" | | Solo |
| 1992 | 4 Hand Safe | "Dhathi Dhuniyeyn" | | Solo |
| 1992 | 4 Hand Safe | "Balaalevey Haadha Ufalun" | | Solo |
| 1992 | 4 Hand Safe | "Libey Aniyaa Karunaigaa" | | Solo |
| 1992 | 4 Hand Safe | "Dhuruvaan Gaimu Beynun Vaathee" | | Solo |
| 1992 | 4 Hand Safe | "Dhirumeh Aa Minivan Nooraanee" | | Solo |
| 1992 | 4 Hand Safe | "Nufilaane Han'dhaan Thiya Dhuniyeyn" | | Solo |
| 1992 | 4 Hand Safe | "Hoadhey Mi Noorun" | | Solo |
| 1992 | 4 Hand Safe | "Feshun Mihen Vaanuvaa" | | Aathifa Aboobakuru |
| 1992 | 4 Hand Safe | "Jaadhubee Asaru Thiya" | | Aathifa Aboobakuru |
| 1992 | Bahaaru Moosum 2 | "Aadhavee Reethi Bahun" | | Solo |
| 1992 | Bahaaru Moosum 2 | "Dhilkashvee" | | Solo |
| 1992 | Bahaaru Moosum 2 | "Engi Majubooru Mee" | | Solo |
| 1992 | Bahaaru Moosum 2 | "Meyaa Hithaa Edhifaa Vey" | | Solo |
| 1992 | Bahaaru Moosum 2 | "Ruhifaa Ahannaa Ekuverivey" | | Solo |
| 1992 | Bahaaru Moosum 2 | "Reyrey Thedhey Rovuney" | | Solo |
| 1992 | Bahaaru Moosum 2 | "Ishqah Mi Nazaru Dhey Dhuniyeygaa" | | Solo |
| 1992 | Bahaaru Moosum 2 | "Ramzuvi Kulavaru Araa Maley" | | Sofa Thaufeeq |
| 1992 | Bahaaru Moosum 2 | "Dhin Thaazaa Dheewaanaavee Asaru" | | Sofa Thaufeeq |
| 1992 | Bahaaru Moosum 2 | "Loabivaathee Ey Magey" | | Sofa Thaufeeq |
| 1992 | Bahaaru Moosum 2 | "Dhee Jaanu Hithaa Ekugaa" | | Sofa Thaufeeq |
| 1992 | Bahaaru Moosum 2 | "Loabivaa Ey Ma Kiyaa Kiyaa" | | Sofa Thaufeeq |
| 1992 | Chance | "Hoadhaashe Dhaanee Vaahaa Mi Haalun" | | Shafeeqa Abdul Latheef |
| 1993 | 4 Hand 6 | "Roalhi Ufaadhey" | | Salma Ibrahim |
| 1993 | 4 Hand 6 | "Hure Mi Bunebalaa Bahakun" | | Salma Ibrahim |
| 1993 | 4 Hand 6 | "Adhu Hithuge Khiyaal" | | Aathifa |
| 1993 | 4 Hand 6 | "Foavamun Dhiyaey Karunun" | | Aathifa |
| 1993 | 4 Hand 6 | "Adhu Husnuvedhaa" | | Aathifa |
| 1993 | 4 Hand 6 | "Masthun Fureyhaa Amaan" | | Aathifa |
| 1993 | 4 Hand 6 | "Dhen Dhen Hoadhaa Mi Foohinuvey" | | Aathifa |
| 1993 | 4 Hand 6 | "Aashiqaa Abadhu" | | Aathifa |
| 1993 | 4 Hand 6 | "Fini Fini Nala Roalhi" | | Aathifa |
| 1993 | 4 Hand 6 | "Feni Beyqaraaru Vaaney" | | Solo |
| 1993 | Beywafaa | "Thiya Beywafaa Veehey" | | Solo |
| 1993 | Hiyfahi | "Ran'galhah Ulhen Ma Visnaanan" | Abdulla Afeef | Fazeela Amir |
| 1993 | Hiyfahi | "Ufaadhey Himeynvee Mi Dhanvaru" | Abdulla Afeef | Fazeela Amir |
| 1993 | Hiyfahi | "Dhakkaa Manzaru Chaaloo Balaalan" | Abdulla Afeef | Fazeela Amir |
| 1993 | Hiyfahi | "Seedhaa Hithaa Khiyaalaa" | Abdulla Afeef | Fazeela Amir |
| 1993 | Hiyfahi | "Gendhaavaru Nuvaneehey" | Abdulla Afeef | Fazeela Amir |
| 1993 | Hiyfahi | "Javvaa Ufaa Fazaa Ey" | Abdulla Afeef | Fazeela Amir |
| 1993 | Hiyfahi | "Ajaibu Antharees Vamey" | Abdulla Afeef | Solo |
| 1993 | Saalhan'ga | "Hoadhee Hoadhee" | | Solo |
| 1994 | Aadheys | "Huree Dhuniyeyga Nimidhaashey" | | Solo |
| 1994 | Aadheys | "Veethee Kihaa Loabin" | | Solo |
| 1994 | Udhaas | "Athugaa Beehilamun Faalhukuran" | | Aishath Inaya |
| 1994 | Udhaas | "Ronee Gabaraave Mithaa Ey" | | Solo |
| 1995 | Aniyaa | "Salaamey Vakivanee Ey" | Easa Shareef | Solo |
| 1995 | Aniyaa | "Ey Husnumevaa" | Mohamed Rasheedh (Annaarey) | Solo |
| 1995 | Aniyaa | "Milkuvi Ran Dhauru Magey" | Tharaboozu Ahmed Riza | Aishath Inaya |
| 1995 | Hiyfahi 2 | "Vaanee Loabin Ekee Dhaashey" | | Fazeela Amir |
| 1995 | Hiyfahi 2 | "Ishqee Athun Hiyy Nagaafaa" | | Fazeela Amir |
| 1995 | Thaubeer | "Dhen Othee Hoadhumey" | Easa Shareef | Shifa Thaufeeq |
| 1995 | Thaubeer | "Kuraa Khiyaalu Hoadheyney" | | Solo |
| 1996 | Asurumaa | "Amaazey Thee Mi Dhuniyeygaa" | | Solo |
| 1996 | Asurumaa | "Ey Nikan Loabeege Raahathu" | | Solo |
| 1996 | Asurumaa | "Dheyshey Mithuraa" | Tharaboozu Ahmed Riza | Solo |
| 1996 | Asurumaa | "Reyrey Mithuraa" | Tharaboozu Ahmed Riza | Shifa Thaufeeq |
| 1996 | Dheewaanaa | "Mi Veynun Asarugaa" | Ahmed Shakeeb | Solo |
| 1996 | Shakuvaa | "Mi Veynun Asarugaa" | Ahmed Shakeeb | Solo |
| 1997 | Faruvaa | "Fikuraa Khiyaalaa Seedhaavey" | | Shifa Thaufeeq |
| 1997 | Mathaaran | "Dhanveemaahey" | | Solo |
| 1997 | Ranthari | "Nayaa Zamaan Mee" | Sofa Thaufeeq | Sofa Thaufeeq |
| 1997 | Ranthari | "Uraalanee" | Sofa Thaufeeq | Sofa Thaufeeq |
| 1998 | Juhaage Handi | "Dheyshey Mithuraa" | Tharaboozu Ahmed Riza | Solo |
| 1998 | Juhaage Handi | "Reyrey Mithuraa" | Tharaboozu Ahmed Riza | Shifa Thaufeeq |
| 1998 | Kuran'gi | "Hithey Folhuvaanee Loabinney" | Ahmed Sharumeel | Zahiyya Thaufeeq |
| 1998 | Vidhuvaru | "Kehidhey Kehidhey" | | Zahiyya Thaufeeq |
| 1998 | Vidhuvaru | "Edhuhu Vee Wafaa Ey" | Ahmed Sharumeel | Zahiyya Thaufeeq |
| 1999 | Itthifaaq | "Dhenhey Seedhaa Saaf Javaabey Mee" | Ahmed Sharumeel | Zahiyya Thaufeeq |
| 1999 | Itthifaaq | "Hithugaa An'dhan Feshi Loabi" | Ahmed Sharumeel | Zahiyya Thaufeeq |
| 1999 | Jalparee | "Hithah Loabi Vevuneemaa" | Mariyam Waheedha | Mariyam Waheedha |
| 1999 | Jalparee | "Loabi Gellumun Meyaa" | Mariyam Waheedha | Solo |
| 2000 | Dhoapattaa | "Mi Bimugaa Hureethee" | | Solo |
| 2000 | Dhoapattaa | "Bimugaa Hin'gaa Musaafireh" | | Solo |
| 2000 | Dhurumi | "Dhaanee Dhaanee Govaalan" | | Solo |
| 2000 | Neyvaa | "Farikamaai Chaalukamey" | Kopee Mohamed Rasheedh | Solo |
| 2000 | Neyvaa | "Gandhee Bunanhey" | Kopee Mohamed Rasheedh | Solo |
| 2000 | Neyvaa | "Hithah Araey Magey Muniyaa" | Kopee Mohamed Rasheedh | Solo |
| 2001 | Haasil | "Kobaahey Mi Dhuniyeyn" | | Solo |
| 2001 | Haasil | "Bunedheyshey Dhulakun" | | Rafiyath Rameeza |
| 2001 | Saamaraa | "Dhen Mi Kiyaaladheebalaa" | | Fathimath Rauf |

=== Religious / Madhaha ===
| Year | Album/Single | Madhaha | Lyricist(s) | Co-artist(s) |
|---|---|---|---|---|
| N/A | N/A | "Mifadha Madumolhi Hitheh" | | Solo |
| N/A | N/A | "Waaqiyaan In Sofuhaain" | Yoosuf Mohamedfulhu | Solo |
| N/A | N/A | "Saadhugee Reethi" | | Solo |
| N/A | N/A | "Kuranvee Han'dhaanaai Zikuraathekey Mee" | Yoosuf Mohamedfulhu | Solo |
| N/A | N/A | "Marudheyshiey Jaanaa Ekugaa" | | Solo |
| N/A | N/A | "Isnengevee Maaiyvee" | Yoosuf Mohamedfulhu | Solo |
| N/A | N/A | "E Yahoodhee Kamaaeku Khiyaal Kuraa" | | Solo |
| N/A | N/A | "Mi Vaadhee Dhekenee" | | Solo |
| N/A | Al Haqqu | "Mihin'dhun Dheloluge" | | Solo |

== Accolades ==
| Year | Award | Category | Nominated work | Result | Ref(s) |
|---|---|---|---|---|---|
| 1986 | National Award of Recognition | Performing Arts - Singing | | Won | |
