= Zalzalaa En'buri Aun =

- Official film poster
- Directed by: Ahmed Nimal
- Screenplay by: Ahmed Nimal
- Produced by: Ahmed Nimal
- Starring: Yoosuf Shafeeu; Sheela Najeeb; Mohamed Manik; Niuma Mohamed
- Cinematography: Ibrahim Moosa
- Edited by: Ahmed Nimal
- Music by: Ayyuman Shareef
- Production company: Nims Movie
- Release date: April 26, 2010
- Running time: 150 minutes
- Country: Maldives
- Language: Dhivehi
- Budget: MVR 250,000

Zalzalaa En'buri Aun is a 2010 horror film written, produced and directed by Ahmed Nimal. Produced under Nims Films, the film stars Yoosuf Shafeeu, Sheela Najeeb and Mohamed Manik in pivotal roles. The film was released on 26 April 2010. It is a spin-off to Aslam Rasheed's horror classic film Zalzalaa (2000) starring, Ibrahim Wisan, Ali Shameel and Niuma Mohamed. The entire film is shot at B. Goidhoo. It took eight months to be completed and ready for release.

== Plot ==
Ahmed Hamza (Yoosuf Shafeeu) visited an uninhabited island near B. Kamadhoo to develop a fish plant. To recruit a crew to work in the factory, Hamza went to Kamadhoo and met Shahana (Sheela Najeeb), a school-dropper with no ambition. Promising he will lead Shahana to a normal life, he asked for marriage approval from her father, Mohamed (Ahmed Nimal). Hamza and Shahana marries and moved in together. She tries to seduce him several times, but he resists the temptation. She goes through his file to perceive that he Hamza is asexual. Feeling cheated, Shahana requests for a divorce which Hamza declines and starts torturing her. Depressed, Shahana takes multiple prescription and over-the-counter medicines, and became unconscious. She was consulted by Dr. Sharim and an affair initiated between Sharim and Shahana. One night, while Hamza was fishing, Sharim murders him.

Six months later, Shahana transferred all of Hamza's assets and properties in her name. Rejoicing the victory, Sharim plans to marry Shahana, and change property ownership to his name before murdering her. The same night, Hamza visits Ali Latheef (Mohamed Rasheed) a police in-charge and revealed news of the supposed murder of Shahaana by Sharim. Upon sharing the news with them, Ahmed (Lufshan Shakeeb), a lawyer, rubbished the rumor. Seeing a photograph of Hamza on the wall, Latheef assured Hamza is alive, distressing Shahana. Sharim disclosed to Latheef that he has been missing for six months and is assumed to be dead. They were met with several terror incidence which made them suspicious about Hamza's death. They checked the site of grave and were assured it has not been dug ever since.

One day, Ahmed was encountered with the spirit disguised as Sharim and tries to murder him. The following day, Hamza visits Fazu (Nashidha Mohamed) and forewarn about her husband's warebouts and his identity. Fazu apprised the incidence to Sharim on his return and was startled on hearing it. Sharim and Shahana believed it is Hamza's spirit agitating them. Hamza revealed his self to Sharim and murdered his wife. Fear of her life, Shahana tried to move to another island, but was talked out of it by Sharim. Shahana called Mohamed and mentioned that she is planning to marry Sharim. The same night, Hamza avenged his death by killing Shahana. Suspecting her death on Hamza, the police team searches for him. On his way to home, Latheef met Hamza and he reveals the secret behind the murders.

Hamza was possessed by a spirit (Niuma Mohamed). From her world, she was granted a rare opportunity to seek love in the human world. She decided that the human to be an infertile man. Hamza agrees to her conditions and decided to build a relation with her. The following night when she arrives, Hamza was being killed by Sharim. She decided to avenge Hamza's death, disguised as him.

== Cast ==
- Yoosuf Shafeeu as Ahmed Hamza
- Niuma Mohamed as an unnamed woman
- Mohamed Manik as Dr. Sharim
- Sheela Najeeb as Shahana
- Lufshan Shakeeb as Ahmed
- Nashidha Mohamed as Fazu
- Mohamed Rasheed as Latheef
- Ahmed Nimal as Mohamed
- Rashad Mohamed as Nizar

== Soundtrack ==
Track listing
No.	Title	Lyrics	Music	Singer(s)	Length
1.	"Aadhey Aadhey"	Mohamed Abdul Ghanee	Ayyuman Shareef	Rafiyath Rameeza
2.	"Aadhey Araam"	Mohamed Abdul Ghanee	Ayyuman Shareef	Shifa Thaufeeq
3.	"Bunaa Hiyy Vey"	Mohamed Abdul Ghanee	Ayyuman Shareef	Mohamed Abdul Ghanee

== Accolades ==
Award	Category	Recipients	Result	Ref.
6th Gaumee Film Awards	Best Film	Zalzalaa En'buri Aun	Nominated	
6th Gaumee Film Awards	Best Director	Ahmed Nimal	Nominated	
6th Gaumee Film Awards	Best Actress	Sheela Najeeb	Nominated	
6th Gaumee Film Awards	Best Supporting Actor	Mohamed Manik	Nominated	
6th Gaumee Film Awards	Best Original Song	Shifa Thaufeeq, Ayyuman Shareef for "Bunaa Hiyy Vey"	Won	
6th Gaumee Film Awards	Best Original Song	Shifa Thaufeeq, Ayyuman Shareef for "Aadhey Aadhey"	Nominated	
6th Gaumee Film Awards	Best Original Song	Shifa Thaufeeq, Ayyuman Shareef for "Aadhey Araamu"	Nominated	
6th Gaumee Film Awards	Best Male Playback Singer	Mohamed Abdul Ghanee for "Bunaa Hiyy Vey"	Won	
6th Gaumee Film Awards	Best Female Playback Singer	Shifa Thaufeeq for "Aadhey Araamu"	Won	
6th Gaumee Film Awards	Best Female Playback Singer	Rafiyath Rameeza for "Aadhey Aadhey"	Nominated	
6th Gaumee Film Awards	Best Editing	Ahmed Nimal	Nominated	
6th Gaumee Film Awards	Best Cinematography	Ibrahim Moosa	Nominated	
6th Gaumee Film Awards	Best Background Music	Ayyuman Shareef	Nominated	
6th Gaumee Film Awards	Best Sound Editing	Ayyuman Shareef	Nominated	
6th Gaumee Film Awards	Best Sound Mixing	Ahmed Nimal, Ayyuman Shareef	Nominated	
6th Gaumee Film Awards	Best Art Direction	Ahmed Nimal	Nominated	
6th Gaumee Film Awards	Best Costume Design	Shimla	Nominated	
6th Gaumee Film Awards	Best Makeup	Mohamed Manik	Nominated	
