= Hussain Ali =

Maldivian singer (born 1976)

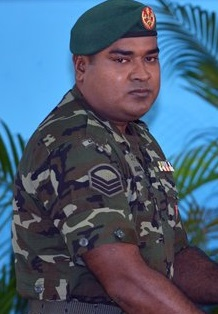
- Ali receiving the National Award of Recognition, 2012
- Born: 26 January 1976 (age 50); F. Nilandhoo, Maldives
- Occupation: Playback singer
- Years active: 1996–present
- Musical career
- Genres: Pop; filmi; ghazal
- Instrument: Vocals

Hussain Ali (born 26 January 1976) is a Maldivian singer and military officer. He currently serves as a captain in the Maldives National Defence Force (MNDF). He worked in the Maldivian film industry and won a Gaumee Film Award for Best Male Playback Singer in 2008.

== Early life and career ==
Hussain Ali was born on 26 January 1976 in Nilandhoo, Faafu Atoll, Maldives. In 1996, he performed the track "Goanaa Kuree" for the album Shakuvaa, one of his earliest releases. Two years later, while a member of the Maldives National Defence Force, he joined the army's music unit, the Cops Band, and performed in several shows and national events. Since then, he has contributed to the annual music album presented by the Maldives National Defence Force on National Day.

In 2004, he covered the song "Madun Mi Ove Nidhaalaathoa" for Ehan'dhaanugai, a local singing show, presented by Television Maldives. He appeared in succeeding shows of the series, including the song "Dhauruvaa Mihan'dhaanthah Ekee" for Mihan'dhaanugai (2006), "Maazee Han'dhaan Kuraathi Fikuru" for Thihan'dhaanugai (2007), "Edhihuri Kamakun" for Thihan'dhaanugai Remix (2008), "Iquraaru Kobaahey" for Ehan'dhaanugai Duet (2009), "Funhaa Loabi Dheynuthoa Ey" for Ehan'dhaanugai Remix (2010), and "Veyn Libeythee Ey" for Ehan'dhaanugai Starz (2015).

His rendition of "Shikaayathekey" from the film Hiyani (2006) won the Gaumee Film Award for Best Male Playback Singer. In 2010, he was a vocal coach in the local singing reality show Voice of Maldives. He was awarded Best Coach in the first season and placed second in the second season. In 2012, the Government of Maldives awarded him the National Award of Recognition for Performing Arts in singing. Ali is most known for his classical rendition of the song "Hin'gaa Hoadhamaahey", a local remake of the Indian ghazal "Tumhe Dillagi" performed by Nusrat Fateh Ali Khan, which Ali's rendition was described as the most "mature and polished" of his career.

== Discography ==
=== Feature film ===
Year	Film	Song	Lyricist(s)	Co-Artist(s)	Notes
2006	Hiyani	"Asthaa Asthaa"	Adam Haleem Adhnan	Lahufa Faiz	Appears in Bichaanaa album
2006	Hiyani	"Shikaayathekey"	Adam Haleem Adhnan	Solo	Appears in Bichaanaa album
2016	Haadharu	"Haadharu" (Theme Song)		Unoosha, Hussain Hamdhoon, Ibrahim Iyaz	
2017	Hahdhu	"Thaubaa Vamey"	Mohamed Abdul Ghanee, Ismail Mubarik	Mohamed Abdul Ghanee, Ibrahim Zaid Ali, Shalabee Ibrahim, Abdulla Nashif	

=== Short film ===
Year	Film	Song	Lyricist(s)	Co-Artist(s)	Notes
2006	Dheke Dhekeves 4	"Bigaraa Ey"	Adam Naseer Ibrahim	Fathimath Zoona	Appears in Oh' Salhi album
2006	Dheke Dhekeves 4	"Farubadha Kan'daashey"	Kopee Mohamed Rasheedh	Hussain Sobah	Appears in Oh' Salhi album

=== Non-Film songs ===
Year	Album/single	Song	Lyricist(s)	Co-artist(s)
—N/a	Vehenee Vaarey	"Thiyaee Nala Nala"		Aneesa Saeedh
—N/a	Bingaa	"Hayaathuge Dhigu Dhathuru Ninman"		Solo
—N/a	Qaumee Dhuvas	"Hin'gaa Hoadhamaahey"	Maumoon Abdul Gayoom	Chorus
1996	Shakuvaa	"Goanaa Kuree"	Ahmed Shakeeb	Solo
1997	Kurunees	"Masthee Mastheevee Lolun"		Solo
1997	Kurunees	"Reetheege Raanee"		Solo
1997	Shabaab	"Foodhey Mi Leyge Karuna Ey"	Ahmed Shakeeb	Solo
1998	Arutha	"Badhunaamuve Loaiybaa Wafaa"		Solo
1998	Meeraa	"Qudhurathee Naazuku"	Kopee Mohamed Rasheedh	Solo
1999	Khiyaal	"Mithaa Roanveehey Dhen"		Solo
2000	Sahaaraa 2	"Nuvaa Ishqakun Shukuriyaa"		Solo
2002	Vindhu	"Alun Annaanuhey"		Solo
2003	Loabi Loabin	"Vaudhaa Huvaa E Kohfaa"	Ahmed Saleem	Solo
2004	Ehan'dhaanugai...	"Madun Mi Ove Nidhaalaathoa"		Solo
2004	Ithubaaru	"Hithu Loabi Hithun Umurah"	Abdulla Muaz Yoosuf	Solo
2004	Yaaraa 1	"Saadhavileyreygaa Dhekey Hithun"	Hussain Ali	Solo
2005	Hiyy Dheefaa	"Karunaige Koarehgaa"		Solo
2005	Maahiyaa	"Maahiyaa"		Solo
2005	Qaumee Dhuvas 1426	"Eheree Dhivehi Nishaan"	Maumoon Abdul Gayoom	Aishath Inaya, Mohamed Huzam, Ahmed Athif
2005	Ulhe Ulhefa	"Eidhey Mee Balan"	Ahmed Nashidh (Dharavandhoo)	Aminath Nashidha
2005	Yaaraa 2	"Dhaashey Thivee Mehemaanaa"	Ahmed Nashidh (Dharavandhoo)	Solo
2006	Bichaanaa	"Asthaa Asthaa"	Adam Haleem Adhnan	Lahufa Faiz
2006	Bichaanaa	"Shikaayathekey"	Adam Haleem Adhnan	Solo
2006	Bichaanaa	"Fari Loabi Nala Loabi"		Lileetha Massoodh
2006	Bichaanaa	"Vaagoiy Angaalaashe Kaloa"		Mumthaz Moosa
2006	Dhenves...	"Laamaseeley Reethi Heelun"		Solo
2006	Jism	"Hiyy Dheebalaashey"	Adam Haleem Adhnan	Solo
2006	Jism	"Hiyy Vey Dheewaanaa"	Adam Haleem Adhnan	Shifa Thaufeeq
2006	Keehve..?	"Loabivanyaa Dhehiyy Gulhaalaa"		Solo
2006	Mihan'dhaanugai...	"Dhauruvaa Mihan'dhaanthah Ekee"		Solo
2006	Mihithun	"Ishaaraaiy Lolun Thiya Kuraa"		Solo
2006	Oh' Salhi	"Bigaraa Ey"	Adam Naseer Ibrahim	Fathimath Zoona
2006	Oh' Salhi	"Farubadha Kan'daashey"	Kopee Mohamed Rasheedh	Hussain Sobah
2006	Vakivi Hin'dhu	"Aashiq Dheewaanaa"		Solo
2007	Hinithunvelaashey - VCD	"Goyyey Goyyey"	Mohamed Zaheen	Shaheedha Mohamed
2007	Hiyy Dheebalaa	"Thiya Reethikamaa"	Ahmed Nashidh (Dharavandhoo)	Fathimath Zoona
2007	Loabin Hinithunvelaashey	"Fahun Iquraaru Uvunee"	Ahmed Haleem	Solo
2007	Loabin Hinithunvelaashey	"Hiyy Dhera Nukurey"	Ahmed Haleem	Solo
2007	Qaumee Dhuvas 1428	"Joashugaa Neiy Lolun"		Ahmed Athif, Mohamed Suhail
2007	Thihan'dhaanugai...	"Maazee Han'dhaan Kuraathi Fikuru"		Solo
2008	Beywafaa Viyas	"Mi Zuvaan Zuvaan Hiyy"	Adam Haleem Adhnan	Aishath Inaya
2008	Beywafaa Viyas	"Haalathu Badhal Kuruvaifiyey"		Solo
2008	Hiyy Dheewaanaa 4	"Ma Firumaa Ulhen Ehbahey"	Shareefa Fakhry	Unoosha
2008	Hiyy Dhemey Loabin	"Falakaa Kaunaa"	Adam Haleem Adhnan	Shifa Thaufeeq
2008	Hiyy Sihenee	"Erey Dhusheemey Thoofaan"		Solo
2008	Thihan'dhaanugai Remix	"Edhihuri Kamakun"		Solo
2009	Adhives... Loabivey	"Loabi Mooney Thiee Huvafenee"		Solo
2009	Adhives... Loabivey	"Loaiybeh Nuvees Gaimey"		Solo
2009	Ehan'dhaanugai Duet	"Iquraaru Kobaahey"		Nashidha Ahmed
2009	Hiyy Furendhen	"Hoadhaadhee Baakee Rey"		Unoosha
2009	Loabivaathee	"Reethi Fari Mithuraa"		Solo
2010	Ehan'dhaanugai Remix	"Funhaa Loabi Dheynuthoa Ey"		Reesha Haleem
2012	Edhuvasthah	"Rihireythakun Baakeevumun"	Shareef	Solo
2012	Hithuge Enme Funminun: S01	"Hithehge Zakham"	Mohamed Abdul Ghanee	Solo
2012	Hithuge Enme Funminun: S01	"Dhulun Bunan Edhunas"	Mohamed Abdul Ghanee	Hawwa Zahira
2012	Loabivumakee	"Aadhey Yaaraa Loabi Zuvaanaa"	Ismail Shameem	Fathimath Zoona
2015	Ehan'dhaanugai Starz	"Veyn Libeythee Ey"	Ahmed Shakeeb	Shaheedha Mohamed
2015	Minivan 50	"Minivan 50" (Theme Song)	Adam Naseer Ibrahim	Rafiyath Rameeza, Mohamed Abdul Ghanee, Unoosha, Aishath Maain Rasheed, Ahmed Ibrahim
2015	Minivan 50	"Qaumee Dhidhaige Ilhaam"		Abdulla Ilhaam Ibrahim, Hussain Shifan, Ibrahim Ahmed, Madheeh Ahmed
2015	Qaumee Dhuvas 1437	"Al-Ghaazee Mohamed Thakurufaanul Auzam"	Adam Naseer Ibrahim	Various
2015	Qaumee Dhuvas 1437	"Qaumu Govaalaa Konme Hin'dhehgaa"		Aasifa Jaufar, Ibrahim Iyaz, Shina Ali, Ibrahim Saeedh, Khadheeja Mohamedfulhu
2015	Ran Han'dhaanugai...: S01	"Maunavee Aalamun"	Easa Shareef	Hunaidha Rashadh
2017	Qaumee Dhuvas 1439: Bahuruva	"Khidhumaiy Kuran Mi Qaumah"		Rafiyath Rameeza, Ibrahim Zaid Ali, Mohamed Abdul Ghanee, Mariyam Ashfa, Aasifa Jaufar
2019	Qaumee Dhuvas 1441: Mintheege Hamahamakan	"Magey Dhivehi Qaumu"		Aminath Saina Mohamed Rasheedh, Haisham Mohamed Rashidh, Aishath Yaraa Shamaal, Amra Mohamed Amir
2019	Qaumee Dhuvas 1441: Mintheege Hamahamakan	"Dhifaaee Kankamugaa"		Aishath Jaisha Waheedh, Abdulla Ilhaam Ibrahim, Zara Mujuthaba, Ahmed Yasir
2019	Qaumee Dhuvas 1441: Mintheege Hamahamakan	"Iqthisoadhee Kankamugaa"		Aishath Jaisha Waheedh, Abdulla Ilhaam Ibrahim, Fathimath Iraadha
2020	Single	"Ilaahee Mibin" (Cover Version)		Various
2020	Qaumee Dhuvas 1442	"Naseyhatheh"		Rafiyath Rameeza, Shalabee Ibrahim, Mariyam Ashfa, Mohamed Suhail
2020	Qaumee Dhuvas 1442	"Qaumu Edhey Ummeedhugaa"		Aminath Anaana, Abdulla Ilhaam Ibrahim

=== Religious / Madhaha ===
Year	Album/single	Madhaha	Lyricist(s)	Co-artist(s)
—N/a	Huvan'dhu	"Yaa Rabbi"		Solo
2020	Single	"Dhu'aage Mih'raabugaa"	Adam Naseer Ibrahim	Various

== Accolades ==
Year	Award	Category	Nominated work	Result	Ref(s)
2008	5th Gaumee Film Awards	Best Male Playback Singer	"Shikaayathekey" - Hiyani	Won	
2010	1st Voice of Maldives	Best Coach		Won	
2011	2nd Voice of Maldives	Best Coach		Runner-up	
2012	National Award of Recognition	Performing Arts - Singing		Won	
