= National Award of Recognition for Performing Arts =

- Awarded for: Outstanding contribution to the field Performing Arts
- First award: 1980
- Final award: 2022
- Most recent winner: Detune Band

Highlights
- Total awarded: 74
- First winner: Ibrahim Ahmed

The National Award of Recognition for Performing Arts is one of the categories in the National Award of Recognition presented annually by the President of the Maldives to acknowledge, encourage and honor the outstanding contribution of individuals in film production, direction, acting, singing and music composition. The National Award is the most prestigious award given in Maldives. Established in 1979, National Award was given in major two categories; National Award of Honor and National Award of Recognition, which is further categorized based on the honored fields.

The first recipient of the award was music composer Ibrahim Ahmed, who has been noted as the local "backbone" for modernizing the old-fashioned music into the latest trend. Among the awardees, singer Fareedha Mohamed is the only posthumous recipient. Actor Chilhiya Moosa Manik, actor Kopee Mohamed Rasheed, Kashima Ahmed Shakir and director Fathimath Nahula have been honored with National Award of Recognition in other fields too.

== Recipients ==
List of award recipients by year
Year (Ceremony)	Image	Recipient	Island	Field	Ref(s)
1980 (2nd)		Ibrahim Ahmed	Male'	Music composition	
1981 (3rd)		Abdul Fattah Yoosuf	Male'	Music composition	
1981 (3rd)		Abdulla Hassan	Male'	Singing	
1982 (4th)		Mohamed Habeeb	Male'	Music composition	
1982 (4th)		Mariyam Ahmed Didi	GDh. Thinadhoo	Singing	
1982 (4th)		Fareedha Mohamed (Note: She was posthumously awarded for the year 1982.)	HA. Hoarafushi	Singing	
1983 (5th)		Ibrahim Hamdhy	Male'	Singing	
1983 (5th)		Fathimath Rauf	Male'	Singing	
1983 (5th)		Chilhiya Moosa Manik	Male'	Theatre performance	
1984 (6th)		Naifaru Dhohokko	Male'	Singing	
1984 (6th)		Abdul Hannan Moosa Didi	Male'	Singing	
1984 (6th)		Kopee Mohamed Rasheed	Male'	Theatre performance	
1985 (7th)		Kashima Ahmed Shakir	Male'	Theatre Performance	
1986 (8th)		Mohamed Rashad	Male'	Singing	
1987 (9th)		Fibo Ahmed Manik	Male'	Theatre performance	
1987 (9th)		Mohamed Khaleel	Male'	Singing	
1988 (10th)		Mahmoodha Shakeeb	Male'	Singing	
1988 (10th)		Mariyam Rasheedha	S. Maradhoo	Theatre performance	
1989 (11th)		Yoosuf Rafeeu	Male'	Acting	
1990 (12th)		Ahmed Nashid	Male'	Music composition	
1991 (13th)		Ahmed Nimal	Male'	Theatre performance	
1992 (14th)		Hassan Yoosuf	Male'	Music composition	
1992 (14th)		Mohamed Zahid	Male'	Music composition	
1992 (14th)		Ibrahim Naseer	Male'	Music composition	
1992 (14th)		Ibrahim Shakeeb	Male'	Singing	
1992 (14th)		Shafeeqa Abdul Latheef	Male'	Singing	
1992 (14th)		Fathimath Rameeza	Male'	Theatre performance	
1993 (15th)		Mohamed Rasheed	Male'	Music composition	
1993 (15th)		Shammoon Hameed	Male'	Music composition	
1993 (15th)		Hassan Mohamed	Holhudhoo	Singing	
1994 (16th)	No Award				
1995 (17th)		Aishath Inaya	Male'	Singing	
1995 (17th)		Umar Zahir	Male'	Singing	
1996 (18th)		Sofa Thaufeeq	Male'	Singing	
1997 (19th)		Reeko Moosa Manik	Male'	Acting	
1998 (20th)		Dhon Annaaru Rasheed	Male'	Film production	
1998 (20th)		Fazeela Amir	Male'	Singing	
1999 (21st)	No Award				
2000 (22nd)		Ahmed Amir	Male'	Music composition	
2000 (22nd)		Shifa Thaufeeq	Male'	Singing	
2000 (22nd)		Hussain Rasheed	Male'	Film production	
2001 (23rd)		Aishath Shiranee	Male'	Acting	
2001 (23rd)		Fathimath Zoona	Male'	Singing	
2002 (24th)		Mukhthar Adam	GA. Dhaandhoo	Singing	
2003 (25th)		Ali Abdul Kareem	Male'	Music composition	
2003 (25th)		Yoosuf Shafeeu	Male'	Acting	
2004 (26th)		Masodi Hassan Khaleel	Male'	Singing	
2004 (26th)		Jamsheedha Ahmed	Gn. Fuvahmulah	Acting	
2004 (26th)		Abdul Faththaah	Kelaa	Film direction	
2005 (27th)		Abdul Baaree	B. Fulhadhoo	Singing	
2005 (27th)		Mohamed Rasheed	Male'	Acting	
2005 (27th)		Ahmed Amir	Dh. Maaenboodhoo	Film production and direction	
2005 (27th)		Mohamed Ikram	Male'	Music composition	
2006 (28th)		Ahmed Faseeh	Male'	Music composition	
2006 (28th)		Mohamed Shuheil	Male'	Singing	
2006 (28th)		Mohamed Munthasir	Male'	Dramatics and choreography	
2006 (28th)		Amjad Ibrahim	Male'	Film direction	
2007 (29th)		Abdul Sameeu Abdul Gafoor	Male'	Singing	
2007 (29th)		Shaaz Saeed	Lh. Naifaru	Music composition	
2007 (29th)		Sheela Najeeb	Male'	Acting	
2008	No Ceremony				
2009 (30th)		Fathimath Nahula	Male'	Film production and direction	
2010 (31st)		Mohamed Majid	Male'	Singing and music composition	
2010 (31st)		Mohamed Niyaz	Male'	Film and song direction and production	
2011 (32nd)		Rafiyath Rameeza	Male'	Singing	
2011 (32nd)		Niuma Mohamed	GDh. Vaadhoo	Acting	
2012 (33rd)		Roanu Hassan Manik	K. Villingili	Acting and theatre performance	
2012 (33rd)		Hussain Ali	F. Nilandhoo	Singing	
2013 (34th)		Hussain Sobah	Male'	Music composition	
2014 (35th)		Ahmed Athif	Male'	Singing	
2015 (36th)	No Award				
2016 (37th)		Mariyam Unoosha	Male'	Singing	
2017 (38th)		Mohamed Abdul Ghanee	Lh. Naifaru	Singing	
2017 (38th)		Ibrahim Rasheed	Male'	Acting and script writing	
2018 (39th)		Ali Shifau	Male'	Film direction	
2018 (39th)		Ibrahim Zaid Ali	GDh. Thinadhoo	Singing and music composition	
2019 (40th)		Abdul Rasheed Ali	Male'	Singing	
2020 (41st)	No Award				
2021 (42nd)	No Award				
2022 (43rd)		Detune Band	—N/a	Singing	
2023 (44th)	No Award				
2024 (45th)	No Award				
2025 (46th)	No Award				
