= Ahmed Zareer =

Maldivian director, producer and screenwriter

- Born: Maldives
- Occupations: Screenwriter, director, producer
- Years active: 2015–present

Ahmed Zareer is a Maldivian screenwriter, director and producer. He initially gained recognition for his collaborative work with screenwriter Mahdi Ahmed, during which they co-wrote screenplays for several projects, including the action masala film Ahsham (2015), family drama Vee Beyvafa (2016) and the crime anthology web series Hatharu Halha (2019). Following disputes during the pre-production stage of the suspense thriller film Vishka (2017), Zareer ventured into independent work, contributing to the screenplay of the thriller film Leena (2019), romantic drama Andhirikan (2020) and political thriller film Maryam (2021), where he also took on the role of co-producer. Later in his career, Zareer expanded his professional portfolio by directing Beeveema, which was released in 2023.

== Career ==
In 2015, Zareer worked with Mahdi Ahmed for Ali Seezan's cop action thriller film Ahsham which follows a police in-charge seeking peace and judgment in a politically empowered local island. The film received a mixed to positive response from critics, where Ahmed Nadheem from Avas praised the writers' effort to blend romance, action and comedy into the film. The film fetched him a nomination for Best Screenplay at 8th Gaumee Film Awards. Ibrahim Wisan directed family drama Vee Beyvafa was released in 2016, where Zareer wrote the screenplay of the film along with Mahdi Ahmed. The film received negative responses from critics, with Ahmed Adhushan of Mihaaru calling it "a step backward" in the progress of cinema.

In 2019, Zareer collaborated with Abdulla Muaz for his thriller film Leena (2019), which centers around a young woman filled with aspirations for her life and future, only to meet a tragic end due to circumstances beyond her control. Inspired by the murder case of Azleena Nafees who was found dead in a bathroom with multiple stab wounds in 2001, the film landed in a controversy when Azleena's family objected to produce a film based on the incident of her suffering. Upon its release, the film received negative reception from critics. Ifraz Ali from Dho? criticized Zareer's "flat screenplay" for the missed opportunities in captivating the audience with thrilling experience. Later in the year, the first Maldivian anthology web series Hatharu Halha was released, for which Zareer alongside Mahdi Ahmed contributed in writing the screenplay for three segments. This project, shot in 2013, was digitally released six years later due to post-production delays. The following year, Zareer wrote the screenplay for Ali Seezan's romantic drama film Andhirikan which follows the downfall of a happy family as the wife is unable to conceive a baby. Upon its release, the film received mixed reviews from critics and due to COVID-19 pandemic the film was pulled from theaters after only four shows were screened.

In 2021, Zareer wrote and co-produced Ibrahim Wisan-directed political thriller film Maryam which narrates the journey of an ordinary woman to dethrone an influential politician representing her constituency. The film was initially scheduled for theatrical release in August 2020, ultimately opting for a digital release due to the COVID-19 pandemic. He then collaborated with Dark Rain Entertainment for a romantic comedy web series Giritee Loabi, starring Mohamed Vishal, Aminath Rashfa, Mohamed Manik and Adam Rizwee in main roles. The series follows an introverted boyfriend who makes attempt to impress the father of his girlfriend. Later during the year, he collaborated with Ali Shazleem for his suspense thriller web series Nafsu which follows a wealthy businessman and his young wife who takes a trip to a local island to escape from the hustle and bustle of the Male' city, and how the girl begins to unravel secrets about the guesthouse they stayed in while confronting long buried secrets regarding her past.

Zareer again collaborated with Dark Rain Entertainment in 2023 to write and direct the drama film Beeveema which revolves around the reunion of former students twenty-two years after their graduation and how this reunion changes the perspective of two childhood lovers about life and separation. Zareer's work as a director and writer was particularly praised where Ahmed Nadheem from Dhauru wrote: "screenplay of Beeveema is an overall advancement in terms of screenplay compared to other local productions. Zareer needs to be credited for establish a good chemistry between the two leads in two separate era with his style of story telling and dialogues". However, he criticized the filmmakers for calling the film an "inspiration" of Tamil film '96 (2018) while it is a "frame-to-frame copy of the same": "The truth is that there is no film titled Beeveema, rather a copied product, wasting the time, skills, money and resources". The same year, he worked with Ali Seezan for his erotic thriller Loabi Vevijje which centers on a man who ends up becoming obsessed with a woman he has a one-night stand with. Although the film was initially announced in 2019 but faced delays due to the COVID-19 pandemic, it eventually opened to mixed reviews from critics. Ahmed Nadheem from Dhauru criticized its "slow-paced" screenplay and the inconsistent character arc. "the story has nothing new to offer, another lazy attempt at story writing".

== Filmography ==
=== Feature film ===
Year	Title	Writer	Director	Producer	Editor	Notes	Ref(s)
2015	Ahsham	Yes				Nominated—Gaumee Film Award for Best Screenplay	
2016	Vee Beyvafa	Yes					
2019	Leena	Yes					
2020	Andhirikan	Yes					
2021	Mariyam	Yes		Yes			
2023	Beeveema	Yes	Yes		Yes		
2023	Loabi Vevijje	Yes					

=== Television ===
Year	Title	Writer	Director	Producer	Notes	Ref(s)
2019	Hatharu Halha	Yes			Web series; 3 segments	
2021	Nafsu	Yes			Web series; 10 episodes	
2021–2022	Giritee Loabi	Yes			Web series; 20 episodes	
2022	Dhoadhi	Yes			Web series; 15 episodes	
2023	Gareena	Yes		Yes	Web series	

== Accolades ==
Year	Award	Category	Nominated work	Result	Ref(s)
2017	8th Gaumee Film Awards	Best Screenplay	Ahsham (shared with Mahdi Ahmed)	Nominated	
