= November (2023 film) =

- Official film poster
- Directed by: Ali Shifau; Aishath Fuad Thaufeeq
- Written by: Aishath Fuad Thaufeeq; Ahmed Tholal
- Screenplay by: Aishath Fuad Thaufeeq; Ahmed Tholal
- Produced by: Mohamed Ali; Aishath Fuad Thaufeeq
- Starring: Mohamed Jumayyil; Mariyam Majudha
- Cinematography: Ali Shifau; Ahmed Sinan
- Edited by: Ali Shifau; Aishath Fuad Thaufeeq
- Music by: Hussain Thaufeeq
- Production company: Dark Rain Entertainment
- Release date: 4 December 2023
- Country: Maldives
- Language: Dhivehi

November is a 2023 Maldivian film directed by Ali Shifau. Produced by Mohamed Ali under Dark Rain Entertainment, the film stars Mohamed Jumayyil and Mariyam Majudha in pivotal roles. The film was released on 4 December 2023. The film marks the first Maldivian film to be featured on the inflight entertainment list of an international airline.

== Plot ==
Yamaan boards a flight to Singapore with the aim of pursuing a degree as a chartered accountant. Seated next to him is Ameera, a Dhivehi linguistics teacher traveling to Singapore for a conference in Australia. When Ameera's connecting flight is canceled, Yamaan invites her to stay at his uncle's house until her travel arrangements are sorted. During their time together, a romantic relationship blossoms. As soon as Ameera's flight is confirmed, they part ways, but not before she leaves a note urging Yamaan to let fate guide their future.

Distraught by the sudden end to their relationship, Yamaan finds solace and encouragement from his uncle. In the passing days, Yamaan undergoes a transformation, changing his profession to photography and relocating to the Maldives after completing his studies. During a project trip to Laamu, he unexpectedly reunites with Ameera, who appears noticeably changed from their initial meeting. Yamaan is determined to delve deeper into understanding the dynamic shift in her behavior, seeing a different side of the vibrant girlfriend he once knew.

== Cast ==
- Mohamed Jumayyil as Yamaan
- Mariyam Majudha as Ameera Moosa
- Ismail Wajeeh as Sam
- Aishath Yaadha as Zeyba
- Fathimath Latheefa as Sameena
- Ahmed Faiz as Raazi
- Aminath Shuha as Huma
- Hussain Haazim as Naaif
- Ali Nadheeh as Hamza
- Hoodh Ibrahim as Irufan
- Mariyam Shifa as Sana
- Mohamed Nazmee as Nazmee
- Aminath Silna as Silna
- Aisha Ali as Hudha
- Mohamed Mazin as Hassan
- Aminath Noora as Farisha
- Shahu Shakir as Wirdha Khalid
- Ahmed Ijuan as Nadheem
- Aminath Shamana as Maleeha
- Tareesh Ismail as young Sam
- Ahmed Rasheed as Naeem
- Aishath Ena Ibrahim as Shaha
- Maria Teresa Pagano as an Italian tourist (Special appearance)
- Shalabee Ibrahim as boyfriend of Italian tourist (Special appearance)
- Moosa Waseem as himself (Special appearance)
- Meyna Hassan as himself (Special appearance)
- Abdulla Sadiq as himself (Special appearance)
- Aishath Rishmy as herself (Special appearance)
- Aminath Waheedha as herself (Special appearance)
- Mohamed Abdul Ghanee as himself (Special appearance)

== Development ==
Following the success of Vakin Loabin (2018), Dark Rain Entertainment announced the project on 23 June 2018 with lead cast as Mohamed Jumayyil and Mariyam Majudha. In July 2019, reports confirmed that actor Ismail Wajeeh, who during the time was residing in Singapore, will make a comeback to screen with November. Filming commenced on 1 October 2019 in Male', K. Thulusdhoo and Laamu Atoll. The remaining scenes of the film were shot in Singapore. In November 2019, it was reported that Ismail Wajeeh's son, Tareesh Ismail joins the cast of November and will feature several prominent faces including Meynaa Hassan, Shalabee Ibrahim, Abdulla Sadiq and Moosa Waseem. Filming was wrapped on 26 January 2020 by shooting a flight sequence to Dh. Kudahuvadhoo.

== Soundtrack ==
The audio of the first single of the film titled "Moosun" which was rendered by Mariyam Ashfa was released on 24 December 2020.

Track listing
No.	Title	Lyrics	Music	Singer(s)	Length
1.	"Moosun"	Shammoon Mohamed	Hussain Thaufeeq	Mariyam Ashfa	3:23
2.	"Lafzu"	Shammoon Mohamed	Hussain Thaufeeq	Shammoon Mohamed	3:15
3.	"Samugaa"	Esa Fulhu	SkyRock	SkyRock	3:34
4.	"Moosun" (Remix)	Shammoon Mohamed, Toy - (Rap)	Hussain Thaufeeq	Toy, Mariyam Ashfa	3:33

== Release and reception ==
A poster of the film was unveiled on 18 February 2020, announcing the release date as 6 July 2020. However, with the closure of movie theatres due to COVID-19 pandemic, the project was pushed. The film was later announced to be theatrically released on 4 December 2023.

The film garnered mixed reviews from critics. Aminath Luba, writing for The Press, praised Mariyam Majudha's performance and commended the incorporation of Maldivian culture into the film. However, she criticized Ismail Wajeeh's dialogues, deeming them "alienated" from the film's theme, and found the screenplay to be predictable. In contrast, Ahmed Nadheem's review was more unfavorable; he expressed the view that the movie is the worst production from Dark Rain Entertainment. Nadheem condemned the screenplay, describing it as a failed attempt to integrate a love concept into an unfamiliar tradition. Unhappy with the color grading and music, he remarked that "the film, along with its theme and emotions, was trapped in a dark color palette, while the music and use of multiple songs killed the vibe of the film".

November was dubbed in Russian and was included in the inflight entertainment collection of Air Astana between January and February 2024, and hence marks the first Maldivian film to be featured on the inflight entertainment list of an international airline.

== Accolades ==
Year	Award	Category	Recipient(s) and nominee(s)	Result	Ref(s)
2025	1st MSPA Film Awards	Best Lead Actor – Female	Mariyam Majudha	Nominated	
2025	1st MSPA Film Awards	Best Playback Singer – Male	Shammoon Mohamed for "Lafzu"	Won	
2025	1st MSPA Film Awards	Best Playback Singer – Male	Shammoon Mohamed for "Inthizaarey"	Nominated	
2025	1st MSPA Film Awards	Best Playback Singer – Female	Mariyam Ashfa for "Moosun"	Won	
2025	1st MSPA Film Awards	Best Original Song	Shammoon Mohamed for "Moosun"	Won	
2025	1st MSPA Film Awards	Best Cinematographer	Ali Shifau, Ahmed Sinan	Nominated	
2025	1st MSPA Film Awards	Best Choreography	Hussain Hazim	Nominated	
2025	1st MSPA Film Awards	Best Makeup – Glamour	Hussain Hazim	Nominated	
2025	1st MSPA Film Awards	Best Sound Engineer	Ali Shifau	Nominated	
2025	5th Karnataka International Film Festival	Best Cinematography	Ali Shifau, Ahmed Sinan	Won	
