= Adam Rizwee =

Maldivian film actor (born 1991)

- އާދަމް ރިޟްވީ
- Rizwee at 8th Dhivehi Film Awards, 2017
- Born: 16 April 1991 (age 35); Male’ City
- Occupation: Actor-Comedian
- Years active: 2014–present
- Board member of: Maldives Society for Performing Arts
- Parents: Ali Manik (father); Arifa Mohamed (mother)

Adam Rizwee is a Maldivian film actor.

== Career ==
In 2014, Rizwee made his film debut in the Aishath Fuad Thaufeeg directed art film Hulhudhaan in a minor role. In 2015 he was cast in Ali Shifau-directed romantic film Emme Fahu Vindha Jehendhen as a doctor, alongside Mohamed Jumayyil and Mariyam Majudha. The film, narrating the struggle and challenges a happily married couple undergo, was the highest grossing Maldivian film of the year, and was a critical success. The following year he starred in another Dark Rain Entertainment's production, the Ali Shifau-directed romantic comedy Vaashey Mashaa Ekee (2016) opposite Mohamed Jumayyil and Mariyam Majudha narrating the life of a happily married couple being separated due to the husband's crippling fear of commitment on his wife's pregnancy. His performance in the film fetched him a nomination as the Best Supporting Actor at the 8th Gaumee Film Awards ceremony.

In 2017, Rizwee featured in the Ali Shifau-directed romantic comedy Mee Loaybakee alongside Mohamed Jumayyil and Mariyam Azza. The film, which is considered to include the largest cast in a Maldivian feature film, narrates the story of two ex-lovers sliding into the friend zone with the envy and diffidence they experience amidst a convoluted love-triangle. The film and his performance received mainly positive reviews from critics where Aishath Maaha of Avas called his acting to be "good overall". The film emerged as one of the highest grossing Maldivian films of 2017.

In 2019 Rizwee was one of the two main actors in the Maldivian super hit comedy film Maamui. This film is the most colossal movie Dark Rain Entertainment has produced to this date. Maamui is directed by Ali Shifau. Produced by Mohamed Ali and Aishath Fuad Thaufeeq, the film stars Sheela Najeeb, Mohamed Jumayyil, Mariyam Azza, Mariyam Majudha, Ismail Jumaih, Abdullah Shafiu Ibrahim and Nuzuhath Shuaib in pivotal roles. The film was released on 1 July 2019.

Later that year Rizwee appeared in the hit studio-based comedy series "The Kaatey Show" produced by Television Maldives alongside Abdullah Shafiu Ibrahim, which became the most viewed programme of that year's Ramadan.

== Filmography ==
=== Feature film ===
Year	Title	Role	Notes	Ref(s)
2014	Hulhudhaan	Ihusaan		
2015	Emme Fahu Vindha Jehendhen	Dr. Najaah Ali		
2016	Vaashey Mashaa Ekee	Rex	Nominated—Gaumee Film Award for Best Supporting Actor	
2017	Mee Loaybakee	Ibrahim Shakir		
2018	Vakin Loabin	Hussain		
2019	Maamui	Pradeeb Rauf		
2023	Beeveema	Fahudh		
2023	Hindhukolheh	Himself	Special appearance	
2023	Nina	Isse		
2023	Free Delivery	Princess Milf		
2024	Fureytha	Zareer		
2024	Bibii	Shareef		
2025	Alifaan	Ah'be		

=== Television ===
Year	Title	Role	Notes	Ref(s)
2021	Rumi á Jannat	Hassan	Main role; 12 episodes	
2021–2022	Giritee Loabi	Ashraf	Main role; 22 episodes	
2022	Biruveri Vaahaka	Rasheed	Main role; Episode: "Mini"	
2022	Dark Rain Chronicles	Naail	Main role in the segment "Assalaam Alaikum"	
2024	Yaaraa	Gulfa's boyfriend	Guest role; "Episode 50"	
2025	Roaleemay	Doctor	Guest role; Episode: "Proposal"	
2025	Feshumaai Nimun	Aiman's gang member	Guest role; Episode: "Slipping Away"	
2025	Moosun	Nawaz	Recurring role	

== Accolades ==
Year	Award	Category	Nominated work	Result	Ref(s)
2017	8th Gaumee Film Awards	Best Supporting Actor	Vaashey Mashaa Ekee	Nominated	
