= Vihaali =

Maldivian web series

- Written by: Ahmed Asim
- Directed by: Ahmed Asim
- Music by: Mohamed Fuad; Irufan Latheef; Mohamed Aiman
- Country of origin: Maldives
- Original language: Divehi
- No. of seasons: 2
- No. of episodes: 5

Production
- Producers: Mariyam Rasheedha; Mohamed Mirusha; Abdulla Hafiz
- Cinematography: Samaah Ibrahim; Ahmed Maahin Fayaz
- Editor: Ahmed Asim
- Production company: Thurukas Films

Original release
- Release: April 3, 2022

Vihaali is a Maldivian crime suspense anthology web series written, edited and directed by Ahmed Asim. Produced by Mariyam Rasheedha under Thurukas Films, the series consists of four episodes, each episode approximately 30 minutes. The pilot episode of the first season was released on 3 April 2022 and was concluded on 2 May 2022.

== Cast and characters ==
=== Season 1 (2022) ===
Lift Golhi

- Ismail Rasheed as Asif
- Nathasha Jaleel as Shazu
- Ahmed Saeed as Hanim
- Mariyam Shifa as Shanee
- Mariyam Haleem as Ameena
- Ali Farooq as Ibrahim
- Abdulla Naseer as Fikuree
- Ali Fizam as Hameed
- Ali Nadheeh as Saif
- Nadheem Hassan as Thief
- Ahmed Suaad as Hussain

Barber

- Hamdhan Farooq as Rimzee
- Shuaib Shifaz as Riffath
- Ahmed Thahuseen as Mujeeb
- MD Sumon as Sumon
- MD Polash Miah as Muneer
- Jamal Hossain as Izzudheen
- Mohamed Afah as Majeed
- Ismail Hossain as Muneer's father
- Hussain Nazim as Hussain
- Mariyam Rasheedha as Ameena

Firimaru

- Ali Farooq as Shakir
- Aminath Rashfa as Aisha
- Mohamed Emau as Naja
- Ali Moosa as Mumthaz
- Ahmed Shaz as Samir
- Ibrahim Rasheed as Police
- Ahmed Shahin as Bentey
- Ibrahim Moosa as Kentey
- Mohamed Rilwan as Murey
- Ismail as Bondhu
- Mohamed Thaufeeq as Driver

Rahmedhu

- Aishath Rishmy as Lai
- Ibrahim Jihad as Muja
- Ali Fizam as Zubba
- Mohamed Rasheed as Nashid
- Abdula Jabbar as Kumar
- Aminath Shaana as Mary
- Aishath Hana as Hana
- Preethi as pharmacist
- Mohamed Samoor as Saaif
- Azaa Saaid Saeed as Zaiko

=== Season 2 (2024) ===
Khadheeja

- Nathasha Jaleel as Khadheeja
- Ravee Farooq as Zuheyru
- Ahmed Nimal as Bakuru
- Mohamed Sodhig as Adhamfulhu
- Niuma as Faheema
- Naveen Mohamed Naeem as Yoosuf
- Mariyam Ainee Shareef as Aiminath
- Aishath Zainee Shareef as Shaiha

== Episodes ==
=== Season 1 (2022) ===
No. overall	No. in season	Title	Directed by	Original release date
1	1	"Lift Golhi"	Ahmed Asim	April 3, 2022
Shazu follows the trial of a blood stain from her living room to the lift pit where she finds a dead body. In flashback it is revealed that her husband, Asif, returns home after duty the previous night and bumps into a thief who hides from Asif by hanging to the lift pit. Asif attacks his visible fingers with a big knife and flushes them before accidentally losing one of the fingers under sofa. The episode ends when the police comes looking for Asif.
2	2	"Barber"	Ahmed Asim	April 10, 2022
Two strangers rob Muneer, a Bangladeshi who was walking to a nearby bank to deposit a large sum of money, in broad daylight, which causes him to lose his job and reputation. He later befriends a barber and spots one of the robbers visiting his salon, requesting him to avenge his loss by blood.
3	3	"Firimaru"	Ahmed Asim	April 17, 2022
Aisha, a cashier working at a restaurant who is married to a middle aged man, Shakir, has an extramarital affair with a customer, Naja. Aisha and Naja involves in a one-night stand which suffers an unexpected loss and trauma.
4	4	"Rahmedhu"	Ahmed Asim	May 2, 2022
Lai, a mother of two children and the wife of an abusive husband, founds her to be pregnant again. That night, her friend, Muja, with whom she has a romantic affair, decides to stay with her despite the pressure from his wife to return home. Zubba catches them together and divorces her after a brutal fight, accusing all their children to be the outcome of her extramarital affairs. As insisted by Lai, Muja brings her some pills to abort the child, which has a terminating impact on her life.

=== Season 2 (2024) ===
No. overall	No. in season	Title	Directed by	Camera by	Original release date
5	1	"Khadheeja"	Ahmed Asim	Mohamed Aiman, Ibrahim Moosa	April 27, 2024
Khadheeja and Zuheyru, struggling with poverty, face desperate times. In a tragic decision, Zuheyru forces his wife into prostitution, initially limiting it to a trusted few. When Bakuru, a local creditor, shows interest in Khadheeja, Zuheyru, fearing gossip, decides she should only cater to foreigners to keep the matter hidden. During one such encounter, Khadheeja faces abuse from four expatriates. Threatening to expose them, she is brutally murdered and hung from a tree, her life ending in tragedy and injustice.

== Development ==
A casting call was made to the general public by Ali Shazleem's Island's Picture on 4 August 2021 followed by a second casting call on 8 August 2021. In August 2021, it was announced that 12 episodes anthology series will be divided into two seasons of six episodes each, all written and directed by Ahmed Asim.

== Soundtrack ==
Track listing
No.	Title	Singer(s)	Length
1.	"Theme song"	Abdulla Hassan

== Release and reception ==
The first episode of the series was released on 3 April 2022, on the occasion of Ramadan 1443, stars Ismail Rasheed, Nathasha Jaleel, Ahmed Saeed and Mariyam Shifa in lead roles. The second episode titled "Barber" was released on 10 April 2022 and follows the avenging tales of an expatriate. The third episode titled "Firimaru" was released on 17 April 2022 focuses on a married woman, Aisha (Aminath Rashfa) and how her life changes after a one-night stand. The last episode was released on 2 May 2022, on the occasion of Eid al-Fitr 1443, stars Aishath Rishmy and Ibrahim Jihad.
