= Ali Farooq =

Maldivian actor

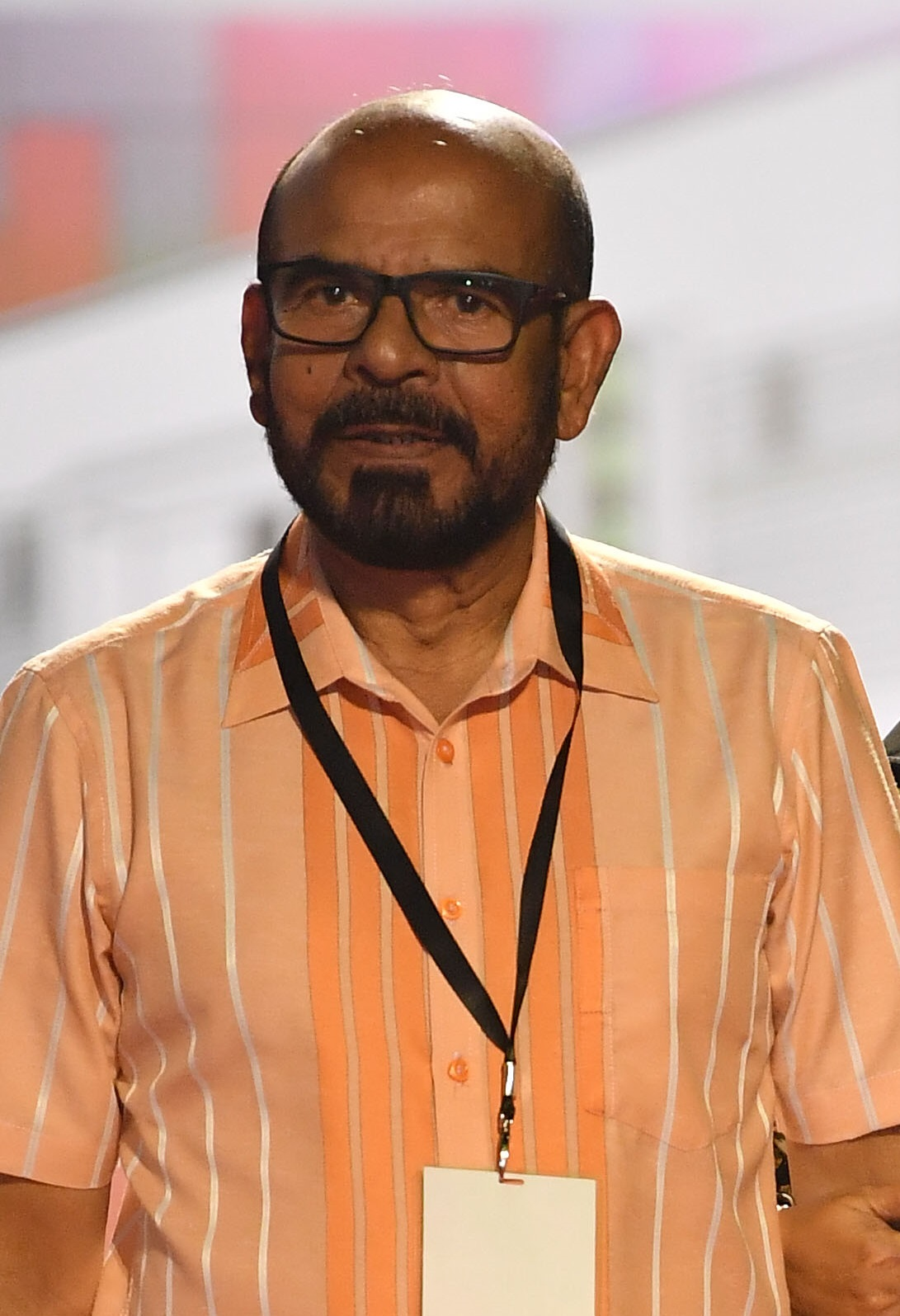
- Farooq attending Olympus reopening ceremony, 2023
- Born: 18 March 1954 (age 72); GA. Dhaandhoo
- Occupation: Film actor
- Years active: 2006–present
- Spouse: Mariyam Haleem
- Children: Ravee Farooq; Hamdhan Farooq; Hamdhoon Farooq

Ali Farooq (born 18 March 1954) is a Maldivian actor.

== Career ==
In 2006, he collaborated with Amjad Ibrahim for romantic drama film Hithuge Edhun (2006), which tells the story of a disabled man, with Farooq playing the role of the father of Shaniya, a caring wife who conceals the truth about her first marriage. He then appeared in Ali Shifau's suspense thriller Happy Birthday (2009) which centers around a man who receives a birthday call informing him that his wife and son have been kidnapped and will be released in exchange for a ransom. Although the film received positive critical acclaim, it struggled at the box office.

In 2014, Farooq worked with Ahmed Nimal's Aniyaa, alongside Niuma Mohamed, Mohamed Jumayyil, Ismail Rasheed and Fathimath Fareela. The film faced challenges during its screening and failed to generate significant attention. Farooq's next release came with Fathimath Nahula's horror film 4426, where he portrayed the role of Alibe, a sorcerer attempting to summon a demon in a possessed girl. Upon its release, the film received mostly positive reviews from critics. The film received predominantly positive reviews and became the highest-grossing film of the year.

He next appeared in Ali Musthafa-directed family drama Malikaa (2017), which delves into the dynamics of a dysfunctional family that disrespects their father. Featuring Ismail Zahir, Nuzuhath Shuaib, Mohamed Jumayyil, Fathimath Azifa, Ahmed Asim, Ali Azim and Neena Saleem in prominent roles, the film received mixed reviews from critics. Despite low expectations from trade analysts, the film performed moderately well at the box office.

The first Maldivian anthology film was released in 2019, featuring Farooq in a segment directed by Moomin Fuad, titled "Baiveriya". The project was shot in 2013 and digitally released six years later due to several delays in post-production.

The following year, he collaborated with Shamin Nizam for Thadhu, a three-part short film series developed by Madhoship Studio with regard to COVID-19 pandemic. It narrates the consequences of the outbreak and perception of lockdown and new-normal in Male' City, through the eyes of three people. Upon release, the film received positive reviews from critics.

In 2021, Farooq played the role of Nashidh, a grumpy handicapped father, in Ravee Farooq directed segment from Raajje TV's anthology television series Hatharu Manzaru. This episode received positive reviews, with praise for its realistic portrayal, and won the Best Film award at the 2023 NKFA Bangkok International Film Festival. The following year, Farooq joined the cast of Huvaa for its second season as a black magic practitioner, who performs a spell to separate a couple on the advice of the ex-husband.

Apart from a guest appearance in the segment "Lift Golhi" from the crime suspense anthology web series Vihaali (2022), Farooq starred in Ahmed Asim's segment titled Firimaru from the same series, where he played the role of an old-aged man who is married to a woman much younger to his age.

== Filmography ==
=== Feature film ===
Year	Title	Role	Notes	Ref(s)
2006	Hithuge Edhun	Mohamed		
2009	Happy Birthday	Bank manager		
2010	Dhin Veynuge Hithaamaigaa	Himself	Special appearance in the song "Annaashey Hinithun Velamaa"	
2014	Aniyaa	Areef		
2016	4426	Alibe		
2017	Malikaa	Munaaz's father		
2017	Mee Loaybakee	Himself	Special appearance	
2018	Vakin Loabin	Office Boss		
2023	Zoya	Moosa		
2024	Udhabaani 2	Alifulhube		
2025	Lily	Alifulhu		
2026	Majunoon	Laana's father	Special appearance	

=== Television ===
Year	Title	Role	Notes	Ref(s)
2012–2013	Adhives Eloaibah Gadharu Kuran	Husham	Recurring role; 13 episodes	
2019–2021	Aharenves Loabivey	Waheed	Main role; 12 episodes	
2019	Ehenas	Clergyman	Guest role; Episode: "Identity"	
2019	Hatharu Halha	Zubeir	In the segment "Baiveriya"	
2020	Huvaa	Unnamed	Recurring role	
2021	Hatharu Manzaru	Nashidh / Bodube	Main role in the segment "Hayaaiy"; Guest role in the segment "Ruqyah"	
2021	Girlfriends	Taxi driver	Guest role; "Episode: Crossroads"	
2022	Vihaali	Shakir / Ibrahim	Main role in the segment "Firimaru"; Guest role in the segment "Lift Golhi"	
2022	Netheemey	Sausan's father	Recurring role; 5 episodes	
2023	Hiy Kalaayah Edheythee	Ziyadh	Recurring role; 13 episodes	
2023	Gareena	Qasim	Main role	

=== Short film ===
Year	Title	Role	Notes
2005	Falhi Sikunthu 2	Athika's father	
2006	Mohamma Kalo V/S Bao Kalo	Seytu	
2012	Dheke Dhekeves 6	Magistrate	
2020	Thadhu	Ameema's father	
