= Maamui =

2019 film by Ali Shifau

- Official film poster
- Directed by: Ali Shifau
- Written by: Aishath Fuad Thaufeeq; Ahmed Tholal
- Screenplay by: Aishath Fuad Thaufeeq; Ahmed Tholal
- Produced by: Mohamed Ali; Aishath Fuad Thaufeeq
- Starring: Sheela Najeeb; Mohamed Jumayyil; Mariyam Azza; Mariyam Majudha; Ismail Jumaih; Ahmed Shakir; Adam Rizwee; Abdullah Shafiu Ibrahim; Nuzuhath Shuaib
- Cinematography: Ali Shifau; Ahmed Sinan
- Edited by: Ali Shifau
- Music by: Hussain Thaufeeq
- Production company: Dark Rain Entertainment
- Release date: July 1, 2019
- Country: Maldives
- Language: Dhivehi

Maamui is a Maldivian 2019 comedy film directed by Ali Shifau. Produced by Mohamed Ali and Aishath Fuad Thaufeeq under Dark Rain Entertainment, the film stars Sheela Najeeb, Mohamed Jumayyil, Mariyam Azza, Mohamed Faisal, Mariyam Majudha, Ismail Jumaih and Nuzuhath Shuaib in pivotal roles. The film was released on 1 July 2019.

== Premise ==
The film follows story of Pradeep Rauf (Adam Rizwee), a half Maldivian, half Indian gangster, who cons people and loots their money, and then make them forget who they are. Pradeep is visited by his boss Hudhu Mukhthaar (Ahmed Shakir) who is about to launch a brand new drug called "Maamui". As preparations for the launch gets underway, local police gives chase to Pradeep, which forces him to hide the bottle inside Salman's house, using his family friendship with Salman's wife, Haifa (Mariyam Azza) as a pretext. Pradeep's plan backfires When Haifa's mother-in-law accidentally adds Maamui into a drink she prepared for her lover. He behaves strangely due to the drug effect of the drug, catching police's attention. In a cat and mouse chase for the drug, Pradeep loses his memory and Mukhthaar barely manages to escape police custody.

== Cast ==
- Ahmed Shakir as Hudhu Mukhthar
- Adam Rizwee as Pradeep Rauf
- Mohamed Jumayyil as Salman
- Mariyam Azza as Haifa
- Sheela Najeeb as Vargina Saeed
- Ismail Jumaih as Aboobakuru Rushdy
- Mariyam Majudha as Taniya
- Abdullah Shafiu Ibrahim as Happu
- Nuzuhath Shuaib as Dhiyana
- Ahmed Sunie as Reethi Issey
- Ali Shazleem as Bunny
- Aishath Yaadha as Saniya
- Maria Teresa Pagano as Romani
- Samahath Razi Mohamed as Zara
- Ibrahim Aman as Arsalan
- Hamdhan Farooq as Rozy
- Ali Nadheeh as Switch
- Ismail Wajeeh as Jaguar
- Mariyam Sajiyath as Hudhu Mukhthar's fourth wife
- Ahmed Naavy Ali as Dhaniyal
- Ahmed Saeed as Dirty Boy
- Mohamed Najah as Hudhu Mukhthar's Bodyguard
- Mohamed Rifshan as Hudhu Mukhthar's Bodyguard
- Maleeha Waheed as Thas; a gym member
- Liam Adam as Jaguar's Bodyguard
- Mohamed Waheed
- Gasim Siraaj as Shifau
- Maisha Ahmed
- Arifa Ibrahim as Arifa Ahmed (special appearance)

== Development ==
The film was announced on 28 July 2017. Initially, Dark Rain Entertainment planned to release Maamui as a web series. However, unable to raise enough funds to develop it as a web series, the production team decided to release it as a feature film. Producer Mohamed Ali said; "we failed to entice sponsor to fund for the project, hence we opt to release the film in theaters. However, we intend to develop individual characters from the film and create a web series based on it". In April 2018, the star cast was confirmed to include Mariyam Azza, Mohamed Jumayyil, Mohamed Faisal, Mariyam Majudha, Sheela Najeeb, Nuzuhath Shuaib, Abdullah Shafiu Ibrahim, Ismail Jumaih, Ahmed Sunil, Hamdhan Farooq, Mariyam Noora, Ahmed Shazleem, Adam Rizvee, Ahmed Shakir and Ibrahim Aman. The film also introduces director Shifau's wife, Aishath Yaadha, who had previously worked in an office-teledrama. Veteran actor Ismail Wajeeh is reported to be featured in a small appearance in the film. Filming for the first schedule of the project was started on 6 May 2018 for a total of ten days. Second schedule of filming was started post Ramazan and shooting was completed on 7 November 2018.

== Soundtrack ==
A promotional video of "Araigen Aai Iraaey" was released on 28 June 2019 which serves as a tribute to the yesteryear Maldivian songs including "Haalu Loabeege Kiyaidhemey", "Vaareyge Paree", "E Keevvebaa Ithubaaru Kuraashey Mithuraa", "Angaadheyshey Adhuvee Ruhigen Ey Malaa", "Maheynethi Dhaaney", "Dhaneehey Aisbalaa" and "Ruhenyaa Loabidhee".

Track listing
No.	Title	Lyrics	Music	Singer(s)	Length
1.	"Araigen Aai Iraaey"	Ahmed Shakir	Hussain Thaufeeq	Abdullah Shafiu Ibrahim, Hawwa Ashra	3:24
2.	"Rey Rey" (Original composition by Abdul Rauf)	Abdul Rauf	Fathuhulla Abdul Fatthah	Hawwa Ashra	3:02
3.	"Rey Rey" (Promotional song)	Abdul Rauf	Hussain Thaufeeq	Mira Mohamed Majid, Toy	3:33
4.	"Joadehge Saafu Loabi"	Shaam Saeed		Andhala Haleem
5.	"Thibaa"	Fathuhulla Abdul Fahthah		Fathuhulla Abdul Fahthah

== Release ==
The film was released on 1 July 2019.

== Accolades ==
Award	Category	Recipient(s) and nominee(s)	Result	Ref(s)
1st MSPA Film Awards	Best Film	Maamui	Nominated	
1st MSPA Film Awards	Best Director	Ali Shifau	Nominated	
1st MSPA Film Awards	Best Supporting Actor – Male	Ahmed Sunee	Nominated	
1st MSPA Film Awards	Best Supporting Actor – Male	Mohamed Jumayyil	Nominated	
1st MSPA Film Awards	Best Supporting Actor – Female	Mariyam Majudha	Nominated	
1st MSPA Film Awards	Best Comedian	Hamdhan Farooq	Nominated	
1st MSPA Film Awards	Best Comedian	Sheela Najeeb	Nominated	
1st MSPA Film Awards	Best Negative Role	Ahmed Shakir	Nominated	
1st MSPA Film Awards	Best Original Screenplay	Aishath Fuad, Ahmed Tholal	Nominated	
1st MSPA Film Awards	Best Editor	Ali Shifau	Won	
1st MSPA Film Awards	Best Cinematographer	Ali Shifau, Ahmed Sinan	Nominated	
1st MSPA Film Awards	Best Choreography	Ismail Jumaih	Nominated	
1st MSPA Film Awards	Best Makeup – Glamour	Hussain Hazim	Won	
1st MSPA Film Awards	Best Costume Designer	Ismail Jumaih, Hussain Hazim	Nominated	
1st MSPA Film Awards	Best Visual Effects	Ahmed Sinan	Nominated	
