= Aadheys =

2014 Maldivian family drama film

- Official film poster
- Directed by: Abdul Faththaah
- Written by: Hassan Ali
- Produced by: Hassan Ali
- Starring: Niuma Mohamed; Hussain Sobah; Amira Ismail; Moosa Zakariyya; Fathimath Azifa
- Edited by: Asim
- Music by: Ibrahim Zaid Ali
- Production company: Dash Studio
- Release date: October 1, 2014
- Country: Maldives
- Language: Dhivehi

Aadheys is a 2014 Maldivian family drama film directed by Abdul Faththaah. Written and produced by Hassan Ali under Dash Studio, the film stars Niuma Mohamed, Hussain Sobah, Amira Ismail, Moosa Zakariyya and Fathimath Azifa in pivotal roles. The film was released on 1 October 2014. Filming took place in R. Ungoofaaru simultaneously with director's romantic film Love Story (2012). Filming was completed on 6 September 2011 and spent 25 days for shooting.

== Cast ==
- Niuma Mohamed as Nifasha
- Hussain Sobah as Ahmed
- Amira Ismail as Zulfa
- Moosa Zakariyya
- Fathimath Azifa as Niha
- Ali Azim as Fahud
- Mariyam Shakeela

== Soundtrack ==
Track listing
No.	Title	Lyrics	Music	Singer(s)	Length
1.	"Aadheys" (Promotional Female Version)	Mohamed Abdul Ghanee	Ibrahim Zaid Ali	Mariyam Ashfa	3:55
2.	"Aadheys" (Promotional Male Version)	Mohamed Abdul Ghanee	Ibrahim Zaid Ali	Ibrahim Mamdhooh	3:30
3.	"Aadheys" (Title Track)	Mohamed Abdul Ghanee	Ibrahim Zaid Ali	Mohamed Abdul Ghanee	4:09
4.	"Aadheys" (Remix Version)	Mohamed Abdul Ghanee	Ibrahim Zaid Ali	Ibrahim Zaid Ali, Mariyam Ashfa	2:35
5.	"Hoadheyey Edhi Hithugaa Vaathee"	Ahmed Haleem	Mohamed Faisal (Fai)	Ali Rameez	3:41
6.	"Thi Khiyaalugaa"	Ahmed Haleem		Ali Rameez, Shifa Thaufeeq	6:28
7.	"Dhefuraana Ekuvefaavaa"	Easa Shareef		Ali Rameez, Rafiyath Rameeza	6:55
8.	"Nifasha I Love You"	Ahmed Haleem		Ali Rameez, Shifa Thaufeeq	6:34
Total length:					37:50

== Release and reception ==
Initially the crew planned to release the film during December 2011. It was later pushed to a 2012 release before finalising the date to 1 October 2014 following the death of writer and producer Hassain Ali. A total of seventeen shows were screened at Olympus Cinema. Upon release, the film received mixed reviews from critics and failed to leave an impression commercially. Ismail Naail reviewing from Vaguthu wrote: "The film focuses on family issue, identity issue and includes romantic components and several other aspects making it a mixed bag of emotions. It has several issues in the technical department though its melodrama might leave an impact on audience. Those who fond art films will be very much disappointed with this project".

== Accolades ==
Award	Category	Recipients	Result	Ref.
8th Gaumee Film Awards	Best Actress	Niuma Mohamed	Nominated	
8th Gaumee Film Awards	Best Supporting Actress	Amira Ismail	Nominated	
8th Gaumee Film Awards	Best Supporting Actress	Fathimath Azifa	Nominated	
8th Gaumee Film Awards	Best Male Debut	Ali Azim	Nominated	
8th Gaumee Film Awards	Best Male Debut	Ibrahim Abdulla Naseer	Nominated	
8th Gaumee Film Awards	Best Lyricist	Mohamed Abdul Ghanee	Nominated	
