= Rumi á Jannat =

Maldivian web series

- Genre: Sitcom
- Written by: Aishath Fuad Thowfeek; Ahmed Tholal
- Directed by: Ali Shifau; Mohamed Faisal
- Starring: Abdullah Shafiu Ibrahim; Nuzuhath Shuaib; Mohamed Faisal; Adam Rizwee
- Theme music composer: Hussain Thaufeeq
- Country of origin: Maldives
- Original language: Dhivehi
- No. of seasons: 1
- No. of episodes: 15

Production
- Cinematography: Ali Shifau
- Editor: Ali Shifau
- Production company: Dark Rain Entertainment

Original release
- Network: MediaNet
- Release: 1 January – 9 April 2021

Rumi á Jannat is a Maldivian sitcom, created by Aishath Fuad Thaufeeq and Ahmed Tholal under Dark Rain Entertainment. The series was distributed by Medianet Multi-Screen and directed by Ali Shifau and Mohamed Faisal. With a cast starring Abdullah Shafiu Ibrahim, Nuzuhath Shuaib, Sheela Najeeb and Roanu Hassan Manik the show revolves on the initial days after the wedding of a couple who are distinctly different worldviews and personalities. The pilot episode of the series was released on 1 January 2021.

== Cast ==
=== Main ===
- Abdullah Shafiu Ibrahim as Rumi Yoosuf
- Nuzuhath Shuaib as Hawwa Jannat
- Mohamed Faisal as Nadhir "Nadey"
- Adam Rizwee as Hassan
- Roanu Hassan Manik as Kuda Maalimee
- Maria Teresa Pagano as Bianca Parmigiano
- Sheela Najeeb as Filameena
- Ahmed Saeed as Haadhy
- Raufath Sodhiq as Meerab
- Mohamed Rifshan as Ali "ET" Idhurees

=== Recurring ===
- Ahmed Sunie as Nestum
- Ali Shazleem as Chintu
- Ahmed Shakir as Mogabe
- Hamdhoon Farooq as Jaadhu
- Aminath Noora as Haadhy's wife
- Ibrahim Shiyaz as Adhanu

=== Guest ===
- Razeena Thaufeeq as a designer (Episode 4)
- Shammoon Mohamed as Firdaus (Episode 6)
- Aishath Gulfa as Shabana (Episode 8)
- Ali Shameel as Nadhir's neighbor (Episode 10)
- Ahmed Giyas as a customer (Episode 14)
- Mariyam Shifa as Lizy (Episode 15)
- Mohamed Waheed as Lizy's father (Episode 15)
- Ismail Wajeeh as Sam (Episode 15)

== Episodes ==
No. overall	No. in season	Title	Directed by	Written by	Original release date
1	1	"In... Decent Proposal"	Ali Shifau, Mohamed Faisal	Aishath Fuad Thowfeek, Ahmed Tholal	January 1, 2021
2	2	"Mikoe Bappa"	Ali Shifau, Mohamed Faisal	Aishath Fuad Thowfeek, Ahmed Tholal	January 8, 2021
3	3	"Mizaajaa Gulhey"	Ali Shifau, Mohamed Faisal	Aishath Fuad Thowfeek, Ahmed Tholal	January 15, 2021
4	4	"Naseeb"	Ali Shifau, Mohamed Faisal	Aishath Fuad Thowfeek, Ahmed Tholal	January 22, 2021
5	5	"Are We There Yet?"	Ali Shifau, Mohamed Faisal	Aishath Fuad Thowfeek, Ahmed Tholal	January 29, 2021
6	6	"Ey Zamaanaa"	Ali Shifau, Mohamed Faisal	Aishath Fuad Thowfeek, Ahmed Tholal	February 5, 2021
7	7	"Farudhaa Yaa Fareyb"	Ali Shifau, Mohamed Faisal	Aishath Fuad Thowfeek, Ahmed Tholal	February 12, 2021
8	8	"Family Matters"	Ali Shifau, Mohamed Faisal	Aishath Fuad Thowfeek, Ahmed Tholal	February 19, 2021
9	9	"Bro Out Law"	Ali Shifau, Mohamed Faisal	Aishath Fuad Thowfeek, Ahmed Tholal	February 26, 2021
10	10	"Keefahu Mashah Rann"	Ali Shifau, Mohamed Faisal	Aishath Fuad Thowfeek, Ahmed Tholal	March 5, 2021
11	11	"Confessions Of A Dhivehi-Phile"	Ali Shifau, Mohamed Faisal	Aishath Fuad Thowfeek	March 12, 2021
12	12	"Mystic & Ms Trust"	Ali Shifau, Mohamed Faisal	Aishath Fuad Thowfeek	March 19, 2021
13	13	"Khallas"	Ali Shifau, Mohamed Faisal	Aishath Fuad Thowfeek	March 26, 2021
14	14	"Vaashey Mashah Ehee"	Ali Shifau, Mohamed Faisal	Aishath Fuad Thowfeek	April 2, 2021
15	15	"Vaashey Mashaa Ekee"	Ali Shifau, Mohamed Faisal	Aishath Fuad Thowfeek	April 9, 2021

== Production ==
On 9 October 2020, Dark Rain Entertainment announced their first sitcom web series titled Rumi á Jannat. The project was initiated during the lockdown period of COVID-19 pandemic due to the temporary closure of cinemas digital platforms being the sole reason for entertainment. A customized set was developed for the filming of the series. On location rehearsal of the series was commenced on 18 October 2020. The main cast of the series was revealed on 9 November 2020 which includes Mariyam Majudha and Abdullah Shafiu Ibrahim in titular roles along with actors Roanu Hassan Manik, Sheela Najeeb, Ahmed Saeed, Adam Rizwee, Mohamed Faisal and Maria Teresa Pagano. On 29 December 2020, it was revealed that Nuzuhath Shuaib will replace Mariyam Majudha as Jannat citing the health condition of the latter.

== Soundtrack ==
Track listing
No.	Title	Singer(s)	Length
1.	"Ey Loabi Asheeqaa"	Veylaa Band

== Release and response ==
The series was made available for streaming through Medianet Multi-Screen from 1 January 2020. The pilot episode of the series was met with positive reviews from critics. Aminath Luba revieweing from Sun was pleased with the comic-timing of the characters and toning down the comical value to the required level, rather than going over the top. "From actors capturing the traits to presenting the comedy narrations, the directors and actors have pulled off their respective roles to near perfection". Echoing similar sentiments, Ahmed Rasheed from MuniAvas complimented the writing of the series for incorporating moral ethics alongside the comedy".
