= Hatharu Halha =

2019 Maldivian anthology crime film

- Official film poster
- Directed by: Moomin Fuad; Ravee Farooq; Ali Shifau; Abdul Faththaah
- Written by: Moomin Fuad; Mahdi Ahmed; Ahmed Zareer
- Produced by: Mohamed Fuad
- Starring: Ali Ibrahim; Niuma Mohamed; Mariyam Majudha; Aminath Rishfa; Ismail Rasheed; Fathimath Fareela; Mariyam Shakeela
- Cinematography: Sofvan
- Edited by: Moomin Fuad
- Music by: Ayyuman Shareef
- Distributed by: Baiskoafu
- Release date: 1 October 2019
- Country: Maldives
- Language: Dhivehi

Hatharu Halha is a 2019 Maldivian anthology crime film, consisting of four short film segments directed by Moomin Fuad, Ravee Farooq, Ali Shifau and Abdul Faththaah. Produced by Mohamed Fuad, the film features an ensemble cast including Ali Ibrahim, Niuma Mohamed, Mariyam Majudha, Aminath Rishfa, Ismail Rasheed, Fathimath Fareela and Mariyam Shakeela. The film, after a delay of six years in post-production was ultimately released on Baiskoafu on 1 October 2019. Hatharu Halha is the first anthology film produced in the Maldivian film industry.

== Premises ==
=== Baiveriya – directed by Moomin Fuad ===
A businessman, Hussain Shaheem (Ali Ibrahim) deals and smuggles drugs carefully hidden inside his son's shoe soles. Shaheem, the clever drug dealer and abusive husband to his wife, Hawwa (Niuma Mohamed) was living his best life, until his crime cover was exposed which lead him being assaulted and murdered in front of his family.

=== Gaathil – directed by Ravee Farooq ===
A premature boy was found dumped in a can on the beach of K. Villingili. Meanwhile, Fadhu (Mariyam Majudha), a drug addict, alone in the apartment, suffering from anxiety, gets high on cocaine to relieve the pain. Her best friend, Aminath "Julie" Habeeba (Aminath Rishfa) the mother of the baby, intends to solely own up and confess to the crime which Fadhu tried to talk her out of it.

=== Foshi – directed by Ali Shifau ===
Asif (Ismail Rasheed) and Sama (Fathimath Fareela) shares a cab ride which grew them closer to each other. They move in together and experience financial hardship. The news of her pregnancy creates additional burden on Asif and the home use of an abortion drug resulted in an unexpected outcome on the fate of Sama who happens to have a medical condition.

=== Dharifiri – directed by Abdul Faththaah ===
This segment revolves around the mother-son incest where the mother is a female perpetrator of sexual abuse and a person who is forced to engage in promiscuous sex for money.

== Cast ==
Baiveriya

- Ali Ibrahim as Hussain Shaheem
- Niuma Mohamed as Hawwa
- Ahmed Ishaar
- Ajay Ali
- Faizaan
- Rifau
- Ali Farooq as Zubeir

Gaathil

- Mariyam Majudha as Fadhu
- Aminath Rishfa as Aminath "Julie" Habeeba
- Mohamed Jumayyil as Katey
- Ravee Farooq

Foshi

- Ismail Rasheed as Asif
- Fathimath Fareela as Sama
- Ali Shazleem as Asif's friend

Dharifiri

- Mariyam Shakeela as Afeefa
- Mohamed Waheed as Ali's uncle
- Ali Azim as Ali

== Development ==
The project was announced in 2013, as producer Mohamed Fuad's attempt to theatrically release the first Maldivian anthology film. Made on a budget of MVR 2,000,000 the directors were provided with a 45 days timeline to complete their respective segment. In 2016, a controversy arises when the producer criticizes the director Ravee Farooq and Abdul Faththaah for "failing" to complete their segments during the stipulated time period. Unable to "contact and mutually agree" on an extended deadline, producer took over the project from Farooq and continued from where he left; post-production work only. Farooq replied to the statement of Fuad and considered his act as a "personal vendetta" against him. According to Faththaah, the laptop in which he stored the project data was lost and had to re-work on his segment from the provided raw files which costed him an unforeseen delay.

== Soundtrack ==
Track listing
No.	Title	Length
1.	"Reythah Dhigulaa Dhanee" (Segment "Foshi")	3:54

== Release ==
The film was initially scheduled to be released theatrically in 2013. However, the producer having issues in appointing a party for the marketing of the film, the project was delayed indefinitely until Baiskoafu acquired the rights to digitally stream the film.
