= Aharenves Loabivey =

Maldivian TV series

- Genre: Romantic drama
- Written by: Safira Moosa
- Screenplay by: Mohamed Aboobakuru
- Directed by: Mohamed Aboobakuru
- No. of seasons: 2

Production
- Producer: Baiskoafu
- Cinematography: Mohamed Aboobakuru; Ibrahim Sobah
- Running time: 27 minutes

Original release
- Network: Baiskoafu
- Release: May 11, 2019 – June 10, 2021

Aharenves Loabivey is a Maldivian romantic drama web television series developed for Baiskoafu by Mohamed Aboobakuru. The series stars Mohamed Aboobakuru, Aishath Yasir, Ibrahim Sobah, Mariyam Haleem and Ali Farooq pivotal roles. The first episode of the series was released on Baiskoafu on 11 May 2019. It revolves around the love-conflict between four siblings from two families. It was renewed for a second season in November 2019 and the first episode of the second series was released on 29 April 2021.

== Premise ==
=== Season 1 ===
Shiyan (Ibrahim Sobah), a diffident introvert, is romantically attracted to a young woman, Nashaya (Aishath Yasir) whom he meets at a party. He tries to confess his love for her on several occasions but fails due to lack of self-confidence. Meanwhile, Nashaya is in a relationship with his elder brother, Sharim (Mohamed Aboobakuru) while Nashaya's younger sister, Neesham (Fathimath Shama) crushes on Shiyan.

=== Season 2 ===
After the demise of Nashaya, Shiyan tries to move forward while ignoring his soon-to-be bride Neesham. Soon after, Shiyan initiates an affair with Zara while his friend, Dr. Madhee starts dating Zara's friend, Karee. Shiyan decides to leave Neesham for Zara unaware that the latter is already married to a wealthy business man.

== Cast and characters ==
=== Main ===
- Mohamed Aboobakuru as Sharim
- Aishath Yasira as Nashaya
- Ibrahim Sobah as Shiyan
- Mariyam Haleem as Thahumeena
- Ali Farooq as Waheed
- Fathimath Shama as Neesham
- Hamid Ali as Seytu
- Mohamed Shafiu as Madhee
- Sujeetha Abdulla as Karee
- Aishath Thuhufa as Zara

=== Recurring ===
- Zuleykha Manike
- Mohamed Musthafa as Akram
- Ibrahim Manik
- Ibrahim Majudhee
- Aishath Dhooma
- Ibrahim Naseer
- Mohamed Rifshan as Wafir

== Soundtrack ==
Track listing
No.	Title	Lyrics	Music	Singer(s)	Length
1.	"Aharenves Loabivey"	Mohamed Abdul Ghanee	Sol Series Sobah	Sol Series Sobah, Hushama Saeed

== Release ==
The first episode among the five episodes was released on 11 May 2019, on the occasion of 1440 Ramadan. A new episode is scheduled to release on Saturday at 21:00 of every week. The first episode of the second series was released on 29 April 2021, on the occasion of 1442 Ramadan.
