= Gaumee Film Award for Best Male Debut =

Gaumee Film Award

- Awarded for: Best Male Debut
- Country: Maldives
- Presented by: National Centre for the Arts

The Gaumee Film Award for Best Male Debut is given as part of the Gaumee Film Awards for Maldivian Films.

The award was first given in 2017. Here is a list of the award winners and the nominees of the respective award ceremonies.

== Winners and nominees ==
| Year | Photos of winners | Actor | Film | Ref(s) |
|---|---|---|---|---|
| 1st (1995) | Not Awarded | | | |
| 2nd (1997) | Not Awarded | | | |
| 3rd (2007) | Not Awarded | | | |
| 4th (2007) | Not Awarded | | | |
| 5th (2008) | Not Awarded | | | |
| 6th (2015) | Not Awarded | | | |
| 7th (2016) | Not Awarded | | | |
| 8th (2017) | | Mohamed Jumayyil | Aniyaa | |
| 8th (2017) | | Abdullah Shafiu Ibrahim | Vaashey Mashaa Ekee | |
| 8th (2017) | | Ismail Jumaih | Neyngi Yaaru Vakivee | |
| 8th (2017) | | Ali Azim | Aadheys | |
| 8th (2017) | | Ibrahim Abdulla Naseer | Aadheys | |
| 9th (2019) | Not Awarded | | | |

== See also ==
- Gaumee Film Awards
