= Mee Loaybakee =

- Official film poster
- Directed by: Ali Shifau
- Written by: Aishath Fuad Thaufeeq; Ali Shifau
- Screenplay by: Aishath Fuad Thaufeeq; Ali Shifau
- Produced by: Mohamed Ali; Aishath Fuad Thaufeeq
- Starring: Mohamed Jumayyil; Mariyam Azza
- Cinematography: Ali Shifau; Ahmed Sinan
- Edited by: Ali Shifau
- Music by: Mohamed Ikram
- Production company: Dark Rain Entertainment
- Release date: April 5, 2017
- Country: Maldives
- Language: Dhivehi

Mee Loaybakee (transl. This is Love) is a 2017 Maldivian romantic comedy film directed by Ali Shifau. Produced by Mohamed Ali and Aishath Fuad Thaufeeq under Dark Rain Entertainment, the film stars Mohamed Jumayyil and Mariyam Azza in pivotal roles. The film was released on 5 April 2017.

== Plot ==
Ishan and Lamha are lovers, but had to part ways as Ishan left abroad for further studies. After completing his studies Ishan returns and announce his marriage with his new girlfriend Nashfa. Lam who still has feelings for Ishan is heartbroken but pretends to be happy for him.

One day Lam challenge Ishan to buy condom from the pharmacy as she knows the pharmacist is Nash's brother Mumthaz. Lam tries her best to separate Nash and Ishan like fooling Nash into believing Ishan likes fish when actually he hates it. She even added laxative into a cake she made for Ishan. But this plan fail as Sid ate the whole cake and suffers from piles. Later Ishan lies to Mumthaz that the condom he brought was for Sid and Lam is Sid's wife. During the mahr ceremony, Sid flirts with his girlfriend Liu and Mumthaz thought he is cheating on Lam.

Day before Ishan's marriage Lam confesses her feelings for Ishan leaving him in a dilemma. On the wedding day Nash encouraged Ishan to go after Lam which he does. While chasing Lam Ishan falls into the sea and Lam jumps in to save him. Ishan confesses his love for Lam and the both hug each other in the water.

== Cast ==
- Mohamed Jumayyil as Ishan: Nash's boyfriend, Lam's love interest.
- Mariyam Azza as Lamha / Lam: Ishaan's best friend and one sided lover.
- Samahath Razi Mohamed as Nashfa / Nash: Ishaan's girlfriend
- Abdullah Shafiu Ibrahim as Sidhgee / Sid: Liu's boyfriend, Ishaan and Lam's friend
- Mariyam Sajiyath as Liusha / Liu: Sid's girlfriend, Ishaan and Lam's friend
- Ibrahim Amaan Hussain as GoGo
- Roanu Hassan Manik as Bodube: Ishaan's uncle
- Mohamed Manik as Adhil: Lam's former boss
- Abdulla Hussain as Kudey
- Ahmed Sunie as Mumthaz Shakir: Nash's brother
- Mohamed Faisal as Imran
- Adam Rizwee as Ibrahim Shakir: Nash's brother
- Ali Shazleem as Hassan Shakir: Nash's brother
- Aminath Noora as Shazu: Hassan Shakir's wife
- Fathimath Sajina Shaheen as Asma: Ibrahim Shakir's wife
- Ahmed Naavil as Naail
- Ahmed Shakir as Maisan Shakir: Mumthaz, Ibrahim and Hassan Shakir's half-brother.
- Maria Teresa Pagano as Dr. Teresa: Sid's Gastroenterologist
- Aishath Gulfa as Dr. Aisha: Ibrahim Shakir's doctor and love interest.
- Abdul Fahthaah as Fatho
- Hamdhan Farooq as Shakir Usman
- Mohamed Waheed as Driver
- Abdulla Azaan as Receptionist
- Ismail Wajeeh as Ismail (special appearance)
- Yamin Rasheed as Yamin (special appearance)
- Zarifa Ahmed as Zarifa (special appearance)
- Ali Sulaiman as Ali Sulaiman (special appearance)
- Ahmed Yafiu as Yafiu (special appearance)
- Liam Adam as LJ (special appearance)
- Ali Farooq (special appearance)
- Ali Firaq as Gang leader
- Ali Nadheeh as Gang member

== Soundtrack ==
Track listing
No.	Title	Lyrics	Music	Singer(s)	Length
1.	"Ey manjey"	Hassan Ajuaan		Fathuhulla Abdul Fahthah Abdullah Shafiu Ibrahim Ibrahim Amaan
2.	"Loabeege iruossuneema"			Equatic Vibe
3.	"Heelaahadhan"			Detune Band
4.	"Ninjeh"			Equatic Vibe
5.	"Maazee aalaavumun"	Abdullah Jailam Wajeeh	Ismail Adheel	Khadheeja Mohamed
6.	"Emme Maleh"			Scores of Flair
7.	"Loabivaaey"			Scores of Flair
8.	"Thibaa"	Fathuhulla Abdul Fahthah		Fathuhulla Abdul Fahthah
9.	"Mee Loaybakee"	Fathuhulla Abdul Fahthah		Fathuhulla Abdul Fahthah

== Accolades ==
Award	Category	Recipient(s) and nominee(s)	Result	Ref(s)
9th Gaumee Film Awards	Best Actress	Mariyam Azza	Nominated	
9th Gaumee Film Awards	Best Playback Singer – Male	Mohamed Aalam Latheef for "Loabivaa Ey"	Nominated	
9th Gaumee Film Awards	Best Playback Singer – Female	Khadheeja Mohamed for "Maazee Aalaa Vumun"	Nominated	
