= Nafsu =

Maldivian web series

- Genre: Horror thriller
- Screenplay by: Ahmed Zareer
- Directed by: Ali Shazleem
- Starring: Ahmed Saeed; Mariyam Shifa; Mariyam Shakeela; Ali Shazleem; Hamdhan Farooq
- Music by: Mohamed Fuad
- Country of origin: Maldives
- Original language: Dhivehi
- No. of series: 1
- No. of episodes: 10

Production
- Producer: Mohamed Fuad
- Cinematography: Ibrahim Misthaah
- Editor: Ibrahim Misthaah
- Production company: Island Pictures

Original release
- Release: June 22 – August 24, 2021

Nafsu is a Maldivian suspense thriller web series developed for Medianet Multi-Screen by Ali Shazleem. Produced by Mohamed Fuad under Island Pictures, the series stars Ahmed Saeed, Mariyam Shifa, Mariyam Shakeela, Ali Shazleem and Hamdhan Farooq in pivotal roles. The story follows a wealthy businessman and his young wife who takes a trip to a local island to escape from the hustle and bustle of the Male' city, and how the girl begins to unravel secrets about the guesthouse they stayed in while confronting long buried secrets regarding her past.

== Cast ==
=== Main ===
- Ahmed Saeed as Faiz
- Mariyam Shifa as Hudha
- Ali Shazleem as Imran
- Mariyam Shakeela as Afiya
- Nashidha Mohamed as Shamsiyya
- Aminath Shuha as Jaisha
- Suja Abdullah as Hamdhan

=== Recurring ===
- Hussain Rasheedh as Iliyas
- Mohamed Manik as Nimal
- Hamdhan Farooq as Afzal
- Ahmed Alam as Dr. Hussain Shahid
- Mohamed Nubail as Step Dad
- Mariyam Nisha as Hudha's Mother
- Maryam Nawla as Young Hudha
- Fathimath Sara Adam as Nadhaa
- Ahmed Solah as Buggy Driver
- Aishath Saajidha as Saaji/Police
- Ibrahim Rasheedh as Police
- Abdulla Saeedh as Police

== Episodes ==
No. overall	No. in season	Title	Directed by	Original release date
1	1	"Episode 1"	Ali Shazleem	June 22, 2021
Hudha (Mariyam Shifa), a prideful arrogant young woman and the second wife, married to a wealthy middle-aged businessman, Faiz (Ahmed Saeed), who has a child of her age. Though Faiz is still married to his first wife, Shamsiyya (Nashidha Mohamed), he prioritizes his responsibilities towards Hudha.
2	2	"Episode 2"	Ali Shazleem	June 29, 2021
Hudha starts experiencing a sleeping disorder, for which a physician recommends the couple to take a vacation and lead a stress-free life. Faiz discusses Hudha's health with Imran who suggests them an island vacation. Faiz's son, Hamdhan (Suja Abdullah) introduces his soon-to-be wife, Jaisha (Aminath Shuha).
3	3	"Episode 3"	Ali Shazleem	July 6, 2021
Faiz and Hudha arrive at the guesthouse. There is a locked room in the guesthouse which seems to draw HUdha's attention. Faiz has to deal with Hudha's unusual mood swings.
4	4	"Episode 4"	Ali Shazleem	July 13, 2021
Faiz and Hudha enjoy a stroll through the island. Something seems to bother Hudha. She unravels some hidden secrets inside the guesthouse.
5	5	"Episode 5"	Ali Shazleem	July 20, 2021
Hudha keeps recalling strange memories. Faiz asks for Imran's help in dealing with the strange events. Hudha continues reading the diary she had found.
6	6	"Episode 6"	Ali Shazleem	July 27, 2021
Hudha uncovers a hidden photo in Aafiya's diary. Imran arrives to the island. Faiz and Imran discuss the strange behavior of Hudha.
7	7	"Episode 7"	Ali Shazleem	August 3, 2021
Imran joins Hudha and Faiz for a picnic. Faiz is uncomfortable with Hudha's behavior. Hudha fears for her life as she sees a man holding a knife inside the guesthouse.
8	8	"Episode 8"	Ali Shazleem	August 10, 2021
Hudha runs away from the guesthouse. She starts getting disturbing flashbacks while running in the woods. Faiz is convinced that Hudha is possessed by a Jinn.
9	9	"Episode 9"	Ali Shazleem	August 17, 2021
Faiz finds out that Imran and Hudha are having an affair. He separates from her after their return to Male'. Belongings of a missing woman are found in the guesthouse Faiz and Hudha stayed in.
10	10	"Episode 10"	Ali Shazleem	August 24, 2021
Police uncover a dead body in the island Faiz and Hudha vacationed at. Faiz gets interrogated by the Police. Jaisha and Hamdhan get involved in helping Faiz understand what was wrong with Hudha.

== Development ==
On 21 March 2021, director Ali Shazleem announced the project as the first venture from his production studio, Island Pictures. Filming for the series took place in March 2021 in Th. Kinbidhoo. The indoor scenes of the series were filmed during the mandatory ten-days quarantine period, when travelling to an inhabited island. The outdoor scenes were filmed once the quarantine period was over.

== Release and response ==
In March 2021 it was announced that the series will be made available for streaming during the first week of Ramadan. Later, it was announced that the first episode of the series will be available for streaming from 22 June 2021. Upon release, the series received mainly positive reviews from critics. Ahmed Rasheed from MuniAvas in particular praised director Shazleem's work and wrote: "Shazleem in his debut direction has proved that he can be soon considered as one of the finest local directors".
