= Aniyaa =

2014 Maldivian family drama film

- Official film poster
- Directed by: Ahmed Nimal
- Written by: Ahmed Nimal
- Screenplay by: Ahmed Nimal
- Produced by: Hussain Rasheed
- Starring: Mohamed Jumayyil; Niuma Mohamed; Ismail Rasheed
- Cinematography: Shivaz Abdulla
- Edited by: Ahmed Nimal
- Music by: Ayyuman Shareef
- Production companies: Nims Films; Fariva Films
- Release date: March 28, 2014
- Running time: 124 minutes
- Country: Maldives
- Language: Dhivehi

Aniyaa is a 2014 Maldivian family drama film directed by Ahmed Nimal. Co-produced by Nims Films and Fariva Films, the film stars Mohamed Jumayyil, Niuma Mohamed and Ismail Rasheed in pivotal roles. The film was released on 28 March 2014. The story of the film revolves around a boy who has been deprived of love from his parents.

== Cast ==
- Mohamed Jumayyil as Anil
- Niuma Mohamed as Mizna
- Ismail Rasheed as Latheef
- Fathimath Fareela as Zilma
- Mariyam Haleem as Nazeeha
- Ali Farooq as Areef
- Neena Saleem
- Hamdhoon Farooq as Zaheen
- Ismail Ziya as Rippe
- Mariyam Shahuza as Areef's mistress

== Development ==
In May 2013, it was announced that Ahmed Nimal decided to launch his son, Mohamed Jumayyil's career with the film Aniyaa, alongside a star cast of Niuma Mohamed, Ismail Rasheed and Fathimath Fareela. It was initially slated to release on 26 September 2016. However, due to delayed post-production it was later pushed to an early November 2013 release, before finalising to release the film on 28 March 2014.

== Soundtrack ==
Track listing
No.	Title	Lyrics	Music	Singer(s)	Length
1.	"Bunaashey Hithaa Ey"	Ismail Mubarik	Ayyuman Shareef	Hassan Jalaal, Rafiyath Rameeza
2.	"Hiyy Meyga Mi Bunanee"	Ismail Mubarik	Ayyuman Shareef	Shifa Thaufeeq, Hassan Ilham
3.	"Mulhi Jaan Hithaa"	Easa Shareef		Mohamed Huzam

== Release and response ==
The film was released on 28 March 2014. Producers were able to screen limited shows of the film due to the technical errors caused within the cinema, forcing abrupt interruptions in screening further shows. Due to this struggle, it failed to garner enough hype to the film.

== Accolades ==
Award	Category	Recipients	Result	Ref.
8th Gaumee Film Awards	Best Supporting Actor	Ismail Rasheed	Nominated	
8th Gaumee Film Awards	Best Supporting Actress	Niuma Mohamed	Nominated	
8th Gaumee Film Awards	Best Male Debut	Mohamed Jumayyil	Won	
8th Gaumee Film Awards	Best Female Playback Singer	Shifa Thaufeeq for "Hiy Meygaa Mibunanee"	Nominated	
8th Gaumee Film Awards	Best Screenplay	Ahmed Nimal	Nominated	
8th Gaumee Film Awards	Best Background Music	Ayyuman Shareef	Nominated	
8th Gaumee Film Awards	Best Sound Mixing	Ayyuman Shareef, Ahmed Nimal	Nominated	
