= Koss Gina Mistake =

- Official film poster
- Directed by: Ali Seezan
- Written by: Yoosuf Shafeeu
- Produced by: Ismail Shafeeq
- Starring: Yoosuf Shafeeu; Ali Seezan; Mariyam Azza; Aminath Rishfa
- Cinematography: Ibrahim Wisan
- Edited by: Yoosuf Shafeeu
- Music by: Mohamed Ikram
- Production companies: Shy Productions; Saturn Studio
- Release date: 5 November 2025
- Country: Maldives
- Language: Dhivehi

Koss Gina Mistake initially titled as Kos Gina Mistake is a Maldivian comedy film directed by Ali Seezan. Produced by Ismail Shafeeq under Shy Productions in association with Saturn Studio, the film stars an ensemble cast including Yoosuf Shafeeu, Mariyam Azza, Ali Seezan, Mariyam Azza and Aminath Rishfa in pivotal roles. The film was scheduled for a theatrical release on 5 November 2025.

== Cast ==
- Yoosuf Shafeeu as Amsadh
- Mariyam Azza as Shaina
- Ali Seezan as Arumin
- Aminath Rishfa as Shaima
- Ahmed Nimal as Hashim
- Mariyam Shifa as Raaniya
- Ali Azim as Fazeen
- Mohamed Jumayyil as Fazeel
- Hamid Ali as Hamza
- Abdullah Shafiu Ibrahim as Faathih
- Ahmed Shakir as Love
- Shaheedha Ahmed as Malika
- Gulisthan Mohamed as Raudha
- Ahmed Aman Ali as Najih

== Development ==
After the success of VMedia's first feature film Dhauvath (2019), the company, on 12 August 2019, announced their next venture titled Kos Gina Mistake which features an ensemble cast including Yoosuf Shafeeu, Ali Seezan, Nuzuhath Shuaib, Ali Azim, Mariyam Azza and Ahmed Easa. Shooting for the film was commenced on 25 August 2019 in ADh. Fenfushi. The team flew back to Male' on 30 September 2019, upon completion of the scheduled shoot at Fenfushi. On 9 January 2020, Ismail Shafeeq was reported to join the crew of the film to co-produce the film. Filming of the six scenes left incomplete during the initial schedule was completed in March 2020. In 2021, due to certain conflicts between VMedia and Shafeeu, the film was announced to be shelved with no prospects of a theatrical release.

However, in January 2025, Saturn Studio re-launched the project with several changes to the crew and cast. While Shafeeu returned as the screenwriter, Ali Seezan took over as director, replacing Shafeeu. Casting changes included Mariyam Azza replacing Nuzuhath Shuaib in the role of Shaina, and Aminath Rishfa taking over the role of Shaima, originally played by Azza. Mariyam Shifa joined the cast as Raaniya, replacing Irufana Ibrahim. Meanwhile, Mohamed Jumayyil and Ahmed Shakir replaced Ahmed Easa and Ahmed Saeed respectively.

== Soundtrack ==
Track listing
No.	Title	Singer(s)	Length
1.	"Dhanvaru Dhanvaru"	Shaza Abdulla Rasheed	2:59
2.	"Reethi Meehun"	Abdullah Shafiu Ibrahim, Mariyam Ashfa	5:02
3.	"Loabi Dhee"	Abdullah Shafiu Ibrahim	5:33
4.	"Rani Rani"	Shaza Abdulla Rasheed, Hassan Tholaq	4:30
5.	"Kessaa Veynaa"	Mariyam Ashfa, Mohamed Abdul Ghanee	3:39
6.	"Fari Kan'bulo"	Hassan Ilham, Shifa Thaufeeq	5:25
7.	"Kos Gina Mistake" (Promotional song)	Hassan Jalaal, Mohamed Abdul Ghanee	3:09

== Release ==
In the event of film announcement, director Yoosuf Shafeeu indicated that the film was scheduled to release in November 2019. However, citing the delay in completion of filming and considering the "unfavourable" nature of releasing the film during the year end, the team announced that the film will release in 2020. Planned to release in July or August 2020, the team later postponed the premiere of the film indefinitely due to COVID-19 pandemic.

The film was finally announced to be released theatrically on 5th November 2025.
