= Maryam (2021 film) =

2021 Maldivian film

- Official film poster
- Directed by: Ibrahim Wisan
- Written by: Ahmed Zareer
- Screenplay by: Ahmed Zareer
- Produced by: Hassan Shazil; Ahmed Zareer; Ibrahim Wisan
- Starring: Mariyam Majudha; Ahmed Saeed; Ali Azim; Ali Shazleem
- Cinematography: Ibrahim Wisan
- Edited by: Ahmed Ameed
- Music by: Ibrahim Shiham
- Production company: Ehkaaf Production
- Distributed by: Medianet
- Release date: 8 April 2021
- Running time: 115 minutes
- Country: Maldives
- Language: Dhivehi

Maryam is a 2021 Maldivian political thriller film directed by Ibrahim Wisan. Produced by Hassan Shazil, Ahmed Zareer and Ibrahim Wisan under Ehkaaf Production, the film stars Mariyam Majudha in title role while Ahmed Saeed, Ali Azim, Ali Shazleem and Roanu Hassan Manik feature in pivotal roles of the film. It narrates the journey of an ordinary woman to dethrone an influential politician representing her constituency.

== Premise ==
Maryam (Mariyam Majudha), a strong and intelligent woman who manages her family including her supportive husband, Ihsaan (Ali Shazleem), daughter and sick father, while working ambitiously at the Health Post of the island, is introduced to the politics, as persuaded by her friends to defeat, Adhunan Haleem (Ahmed Saeed), the current MP representing their constituency. As soon as Maryam wins the primary election to represent the opposition party, the leader of the party, Ibrahim Naeem (Mohamed Waheed) is bribed by Haleem to call off the party seat, which puts an additional burden on Maryam financially. However, this does not stop Maryam from moving ahead with the political career as she registers to compete for the seat as an independent candidate.

== Cast ==
- Mariyam Majudha as Maryam Mohamed
- Ahmed Saeed as Adhunan Haleem
- Ali Azim as Ilhaam
- Ali Shazleem as Ihsaan Hussain
- Roanu Hassan Manik
- Aminath Nisha as Fareesha
- Maisharath Ahmed as Ameena
- Mohamed Waheed as Ibrahim Naeem
- Imran Mohamed as Solih
- Mariyam Lamsa Latheef as Ruha
- Arushad Nooree as Jaufar

== Development ==
A political thriller titled Maryam was announced in March 2020 which marks Ibrahim Wisan's second direction after the film Vee Beyvafa (2016). The cast of the film was released shortly, which includes Mariyam Majudha, Ahmed Saeed, Ali Azim, Ali Shazleem and Roanu Hassan Manik in pivotal roles. The film marks Majudha's first feature film under a different studio other than Dark Rain Entertainment. In the film, she portrays the role of an empowering woman rising in a political mess. After completing the shoot in Male', the cast and crew departed to M. Mulah in early March 2020. Filming was completed on 29 March 2020. Post production of the film was carried out by Okeyz Ink. The film narrates the journey of an ordinary woman to dethrone an influential politician representing her constituency, Kandifaru Dhaaira, which consists of three islands, Kandifaru, Kaafushidhoo and Lonudhoo.

== Soundtrack ==
Track listing
No.	Title	Lyrics	Music	Singer(s)	Length
1.	"Ummeedhu"	Nasma Abdul Muhsin	Ibrahim Shiham	Nasma Abdul Muhsin	2:45
2.	"Huvafen"	Nasma Abdul Muhsin	Ibrahim Shiham	Nasma Abdul Muhsin

== Release ==
The film was scheduled for theatrical release in August 2020, but was postponed due to the COVID-19 pandemic. In March 2021, it was revealed that the film will not be released theatrically, instead it will be streamed through Medianet Multi Screen application as its premiere on 8 April 2021.
