= Gareena =

Maldivian web series

- Created by: Hassan Shazil
- Written by: Ahmed Zareer
- Directed by: Mohamed Faisal
- Starring: Mariyam Majudha; Mohamed Faisal; Ali Farooq; Ansham Mohamed; Rafiu Mohamed
- Music by: Munaz Zubair
- Country of origin: Maldives
- Original language: Divehi
- No. of seasons: 1
- No. of episodes: 13

Production
- Producers: Hassan Shazil; Ahmed Zareer
- Cinematography: Ibrahim Sujau
- Running time: 23-35 minutes
- Production company: Ehkaaf Production

Original release
- Release: October 5, 2023

Gareena is a Maldivian crime thriller web series directed by Mohamed Faisal. It stars Mariyam Majudha, Mohamed Faisal, Ansham Mohamed and Rafiu Mohamed in main roles. The pilot episode of the series was released on 5 October 2023. Filming took place in B. Goidhoo and K. Thulusdhoo.

== Premise ==
Shimla, an award winning journalist travels to a remote island to cover a brutal murder case of a five year old girl. She works closely with Police IO Rilwan, who led the investigation. Slowly, the case becomes Shimla's most challenging job as a journalist. The more she searches for answers, a dark past starts to haunt her.

== Cast and characters ==
=== Main ===
- Mariyam Majudha as Aminath Shimla
- Mohamed Faisal as Rilwan
- Ali Farooq as Qasim
- Ansham Mohamed as Sana
- Rafiu Mohamed as Rayyan

=== Recurring ===
- Faina Fathimath as Ruqiyya
- Mariyam Waheedha as Muslima
- Abdullah Shafiu Ibrahim as Ahmed Afrah
- Aisha Ali as Asma
- Ahmed Sharif as Ziyad
- Ali Shazleem as Yaamin
- Mohamed Shivaz as Abeedh; Shimla's boyfriend
- Adhuham Layaal Qasim as Ahusan; a drug dealer
- Mariyam Haleem as Fareedha; Sana's mother
- Hamdhan Farooq as Ibrahim
- Ali Musharraf
- Rabeeul as Hosni
- Ameen
- Jamaal
- Mohamed Rifshan as Farey; Rayyan's friend (Episode 9)

== Episodes ==
| No. | Title | Directed by | Original release date |
|---|---|---|---|
| 1 | "Pilot" | Mohamed Faisal | October 5, 2023 |
Investigation Officer, Rilwan (Mohamed Faisal) invites three-time award winning ambitious journalist, Aminath Shimla (Mariyam Majudha) to the crime scene in Lonudhoo, where a five year old girl, Eena was found dead in the jungle. According to Rilwan, Eena is the adopted child of Qasim, who is one of the suspects in the case. Shimla intends to investigate Qasim's personal life further, as he has a history of two failed marriages and is currently married to a young woman named Sana. Meanwhile, the islanders have differing opinions about the expatriates on the island, who are also neighbors of Eena.
| 2 | "New Suspect" | Mohamed Faisal | October 5, 2023 |
Shimla visits Qasim, but he initially hesitates to cooperate and requests that his personal life not be published in the news. However, he eventually opens up about Eena during the interview, but it ends emotionally, leaving Shimla with the feeling that he might be hiding something. Shimla also encounters resistance from some of the local residents, who are less cooperative with her investigation, including Qasim's second wife, Muslima. At the suggestion of Rilwan, she decides to accompany a local resident, Rayyan who is a keen journalism enthusiast and also a big fan of Shimla herself. Meanwhile, a group locals attack Ahusan, a drug dealer who is being accused in the crime as he was seen with Eena on the day of her disappearance.
| 3 | "External Affairs" | Mohamed Faisal | October 5, 2023 |
Muslima finally decided to speak out about Qasim and Eena, with the condition that her interview would remain anonymous. The interview yield nothing concrete except that Qasim prefers his wives to always remain young. To ensure Ahusan's safety, the police took him away from the island. This news was reported by a fellow journalist, Afrah. The article also mentioned that the medical report indicated that Eena had been sexually assaulted, much to Rilwan and Shimla's surprise. Meanwhile, the expatriates began interrogating each other to determine if any of them were involved in the crime. Saif, a Bangladeshi suspect, is handed over to another group with their own agenda.
| 4 | "A New Challenge" | Mohamed Faisal | October 12, 2023 |
Afrah travels to Londhoo to report on the news and challenges Shimla. Frustrated, she confronts Rilwan about Affrah's access to classified information. Rilwan responds by providing her with a pen drive containing crucial CCTV footage, which becomes a valuable lead in their ongoing investigation. Meanwhile, Shimla, accompanied by Rayyan, pays a visit to Hosni, who works with Saif in the field work. She also confronts Ameen, a Bangladeshi shopkeeper, in an effort to gather more information about Saif's activities on the day Eena went missing.
| 5 | "Doubt" | Mohamed Faisal | October 19, 2023 |
Despite Saif's arrest, Shimla feels the real killer is still on loose. Her doubt takes her to a dangerous route to find out more about Bangladeshi workers and their relationship with Saif.
| 6 | "Sanaa" | Mohamed Faisal | October 26, 2023 |
Shimla seizes the opportunity to have a conversation with Sanaa, during which Sanaa shares some heartbreaking truths about Qasim. She reveals that her mother had sold her for money to cover her father's medical expenses. After their wedding, Qasim opted to adopt a child instead of having Sanaa give birth to preserve her beauty. Sanaa accepted Eena as her own, raising her with love and care. Unexpectedly, Eena confides in Shimla one day, admitting her strong aversion towards Qasim for an undisclosed reason. When Shimla inquires about the day Eena disappeared, Sanaa shares her suspicions about a handicapped mute named Ibrahim and mentions that Saif is the last person on her list of suspects.
| 7 | "Perspective" | Mohamed Faisal | November 2, 2023 |
Shimla seizes the chance to have a conversation with Saif, hoping to find answers. Saif recounts the events surrounding Eena's disappearance and what occurred afterward. Shimla notices some slight inconsistencies between Saif's story and Sana's account. According to Saif, he was used as a scapegoat by his fellow Bangladeshis, who did so to maintain their reputation among the islanders. As Shimla prepares to leave the police station, Saif drops a subtle hint about Qasim's potential involvement in his arrest.
| 8 | "Opportunity" | Mohamed Faisal | December 7, 2023 |
Abeedh's visit to Shimla strains his relationship. Gasim agrees to an interview with Afrah, escalating his competitive dynamics with Shimla. However, when confronted privately with sensitive information, Gasim eventually relents and agrees to an interview with Shimla. During the interview, he reveals details about a crucial financial transaction he undertook to save Saif. Sana later hints that the story seems too convenient to believe, adding an element of skepticism to Gasim's disclosure.
| 9 | "Lead" | Mohamed Faisal | December 14, 2023 |
Rayyan recounts the incident of Eena's disappearance from his perspective. In his revelation, he mentions following an elderly man during the search, and Shimla suspects it to be Qasim based on the specific details provided, especially the shirt he was wearing. Meanwhile, Shimla and Rayyan meet Ibrahim, the last person to see Eena before her murder. Ibrahim suggests that the last person Eena interacted with may have been intoxicated.
| 10 | "Influence" | Mohamed Faisal | December 21, 2023 |
Shimla was puzzled to hear that Saif admitted killing Eena but beyond where the media can reach, things take another shocking twist of diplomatic influence.
| 11 | "Haunted" | Mohamed Faisal | December 28, 2023 |
Shimla finally meets Rugiyya, Qasim’s ex wife but in a familiar setting where Shimla has a very dark history. Ahsan’s connection to Rugiyyaa make things more suspicious.
| 12 | "Risk" | Mohamed Faisal | January 4, 2024 |
Rayyan is convinced Ahsan is the murderer and chases him to the jungle. A risk everyone was baffled with Rayyan's decision and he confronts Ahsan in a do or die situation.
| 13 | "Truth" | Mohamed Faisal | January 11, 2024 |
It looked like another successful case added to Shimla's already impressive record but she feels something is not right and travels back to Lonadhoo and finds the shocking truth.

== Release and reception ==
The first part of first season consisting of 7 episodes was premiered on 5 October 2023 through Medianet Multi Screen. The second part of the first season was premiered on 7 December 2023.

Upon its premiere, the series mainly received positive reviews from critics. Akram Abdulla from Dhuvas particularly praised the background music by Munaz Zubair and sound mixing developed by Ahmed Ishan for creating the required thrills in the series.
