= Abdullah Shafiu Ibrahim =

Maldivian film actor and playback singer

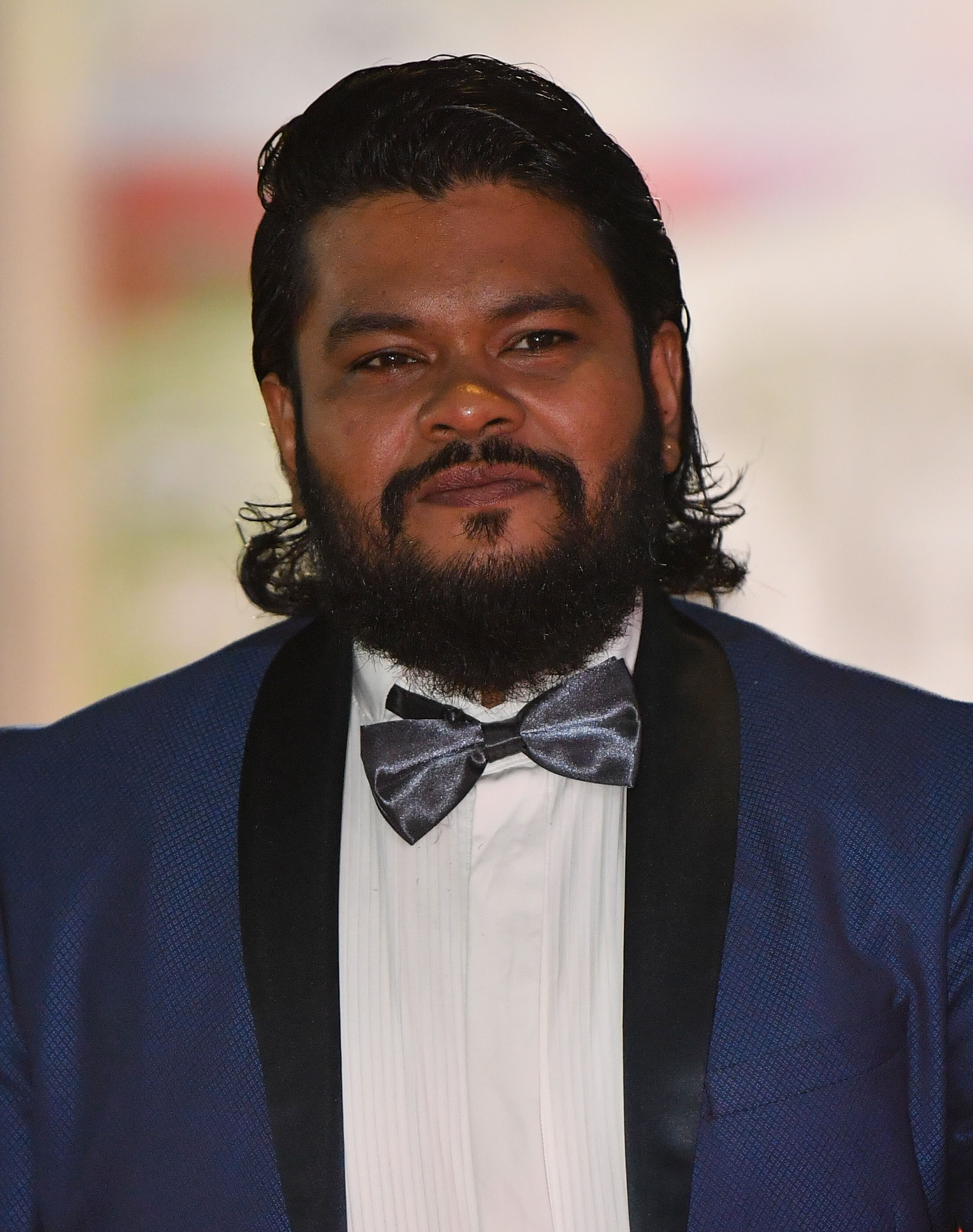
- Ibrahim attending Olympus reopening ceremony, 2023
- Born: 26 September 1991 (age 34); M. Kolhufushi, Maldives
- Occupations: Actor, playback singer
- Years active: 2016–present

Abdullah Shafiu Ibrahim (born 26 September 1991) is a Maldivian film actor and playback singer.

== Career ==
Ibrahim made his film debut with the Dark Rain Entertainment production, the Ali Shifau-directed romantic comedy Vaashey Mashaa Ekee (2016) opposite Mohamed Jumayyil and Mariyam Majudha narrating the life of a happily married couple being separated due to the husband's crippling fear of commitment on his wife's pregnancy. His performance as an unfaithful boyfriend fetched him a nomination as the Best Male Debut at the 8th Gaumee Film Awards ceremony. The following year, Ibrahim featured in another Ali Shifau-directed romantic comedy, Mee Loaybakee alongside Mohamed Jumayyil and Mariyam Azza. The film, which is considered to include the largest cast in a Maldivian feature film, narrates the story of two ex-lovers sliding into the friend zone with the envy and diffidence they experience amidst a convoluted love-triangle. His performance as a comedic friend diagnosed with piles received a positive response from critics where Aishath Maaha of Avas wrote: "considering this is his second release, Ibrahim showed great potential with his admirable performance with the perfect comic timing". The film emerged as one of the highest grossing Maldivian films of 2017.

Ibrahim next starred in a recurring role in the first Maldivian web-series, a romantic drama by Fathimath Nahula, Huvaa which began streaming in November 2018. The series consists of sixty episodes and streamed through the digital platform Baiskoafu, centering around a happy and radiant family which breaks into despairing pieces after a tragic incident that led to an unaccountable loss. The series and his performance as a gang-member being arrested for murder, were positively received.

In 2023, Ibrahim played the role of an amusing friend in Ali Seezan's erotic thriller Loabi Vevijje, which follows a married man who becomes infatuated with a woman after a one-night stand. The film which was announced in 2019, but halted due to COVID-19 pandemic, opened to generally positive reviews from critics, specifically for its cinematography.

== Filmography ==
Key
†	Denotes films that have not yet been released

=== Film ===
Year	Title	Role	Notes	Ref(s)
2016	Vaashey Mashaa Ekee	Fubu	Nominated—Gaumee Film Award for Best Male Debut	
2017	Mee Loaybakee	Sid		
2018	Vakin Loabin	Whiskey		
2019	Maamui	Happu		
2023	Loabi Vevijje	Hassan		
2024	Bibii	Rex		
2025	Koss Gina Mistake	Faathih		
2026	Magey Bituge Wedding †		Post production	

=== Television ===
Year	Title	Role	Notes	Ref(s)
2018–2020	Huvaa	Munthasir	Recurring role	
2020–2021	Huvaa Kohfa Bunan	Dhaain	Main role	
2021	Rumi á Jannat	Rumi Yoosuf	Main role; 15 episodes	
2023	Gareena	Ahmed Afrah	Recurring role	
2024	Dark Rain Chronicles	Shah	Main role in the segment "Dhemaa"	
2025	Moosun	Shaheen	Recurring role; 6 episodes	
2026	Ekaniveri Hithakun...	Ahtu	Recurring role; 6 Episodes and worked as an Assistant Director	

=== Short film ===
Year	Title	Role	Notes	Ref(s)
2021	Gulhun	Imma		

== Discography ==
Year	Album/Film	Track	Lyricist(s)	Co-artist(s)
2019	Maamui	"Araigen Aai Iraaey"	Ahmed Shakir	Hawwa Ashra
2023	Loabi Vevijje	"Loabi Vevijje" (Promo song)	Mohamed Abdul Ghanee	Ali Seezan, Ahmed Nimal, Ahmed Easa, Ali Azim, Mariyam Azza, Aminath Rishfa, Irufana Ibrahim

== Accolades ==
Year	Award	Category	Nominated work	Result	Ref(s)
2017	8th Gaumee Film Awards	Best Male Debut	Vaashey Mashaa Ekee	Nominated	
