= Vakin Loabin =

- Official film poster
- Directed by: Ali Shifau
- Written by: Aishath Fuad Thaufeeq
- Screenplay by: Aishath Fuad Thaufeeq
- Produced by: Mohamed Ali; Aishath Fuad Thaufeeq
- Starring: Mohamed Jumayyil; Mariyam Majudha; Nuzuhath Shuaib
- Cinematography: Ali Shifau; Ahmed Sinan
- Edited by: Ali Shifau
- Music by: Mohamed Ikram
- Production company: Dark Rain Entertainment
- Release date: March 5, 2018
- Country: Maldives
- Language: Dhivehi

Vakin Loabin is a 2018 Maldivian family drama film directed by Ali Shifau. Co-produced by Mohamed Ali and Aishath Fuad Thaufeeq under Dark Rain Entertainment, the film stars Mohamed Jumayyil and Mariyam Majudha and Nuzuhath Shuaib in pivotal roles. The film was released on 5 March 2018. The film tells a story of a young couple's divorce and its impact on everyone around.

== Cast ==
- Mohamed Jumayyil as Azaan Adam
- Mariyam Majudha as Nuha Zahir
- Nuzuhath Shuaib as Roona
- Khadheeja Ibrahim Didi as Salma
- Abdullah Shafiu Ibrahim as Whiskey
- Ahmed Sunie as Bullet
- Ibrahim Amaan as Isse
- Maisha Ahmed as Fazu
- Roanu Hassan Manik as Judge
- Ahmed Shakir as Uz. Ibrahim Adheel
- Mariyam Shakeela as Khalidha
- Azim as Samadh
- Ali Farooq as Office Boss
- Mariyam Sajiyath as Dr. Aisha
- Adam Rizwee as Hussain
- Maria Teresa Pagano as Tourist
- Mohamed Azim Abdul Haadi as Samad

== Production ==
Filming commenced on 7 August 2017 and finished on in November 2017. It marks Jumayyil's second collaboration with Shuaib and his third collaboration with Majudha.

== Soundtrack ==
Track listing
No.	Title	Lyrics	Music	Singer(s)	Length
1.	"Nithuga Nashaa Raani"	Ishaante, Affan	Fatho	Hamoodh
2.	"Raki Hinithun"	Fatho	Fatho	Fatho, Insha Ahmed
3.	"Dhuniye Dhauruva"	Shammoon Mohamed	Fatho	Shammoon Mohamed
4.	"Paree"			Equatic Vibe
5.	"Rankokaa"			Scores of Flair

== Release and reception ==
Vakin Loabin was released on 5 March 2018 and opened to a positive response at the box office. The film received a positive response from critics. Ismail Naail Nasheed from Rajje.mv applauded character development and the "remarkable" use of character building elements while specifically praising the screenplay for toning down its melodrama and breaking from the stereotypes of its genre.

== Accolades ==
Award	Category	Recipient(s) and nominee(s)	Result	Ref(s)
9th Gaumee Film Awards	Best film	Vakin Loabin	Nominated	
9th Gaumee Film Awards	Best Director	Ali Shifau	Nominated	
9th Gaumee Film Awards	Best Actor	Mohamed Jumayyil	Nominated	
9th Gaumee Film Awards	Best Actress	Mariyam Majudha	Nominated	
9th Gaumee Film Awards	Best Supporting Actress	Khadheeja Ibrahim Didi	Won	
9th Gaumee Film Awards	Best Supporting Actress	Nuzuhath Shuaib	Nominated	
9th Gaumee Film Awards	Original Song	Shammoon Mohamed for "Dhuniye Dhauruve"	Nominated	
9th Gaumee Film Awards	Best Lyricist	Shammoon Mohamed - "Dhuniye Dhauruve"	Nominated	
9th Gaumee Film Awards	Best Male Playback Singer	Shammoon Mohamed for "Dhuniye Dhauruve"	Nominated	
9th Gaumee Film Awards	Best Screenplay	Aishath Fuad Thaufeeq	Nominated	
9th Gaumee Film Awards	Best Background Music	Mohamed Ikram	Nominated	
9th Gaumee Film Awards	Best Art Direction	Ali Shifau, Mohamed Ali, Aishath Fuad Thaufeeq	Nominated	
9th Gaumee Film Awards	Best Costume Design	Hussain Hazim	Nominated	
9th Gaumee Film Awards	Best Sound Editing	Ali Shifau	Nominated	
1st MSPA Film Awards	Best Film	Vakin Loabin	Nominated	
1st MSPA Film Awards	Best Director	Ali Shifau	Nominated	
1st MSPA Film Awards	Best Lead Actor – Male	Mohamed Jumayyil	Nominated	
1st MSPA Film Awards	Best Debut – Female	Nuzuhath Shuaib	Nominated	
1st MSPA Film Awards	Best Comedian	Nuzuhath Shuaib	Nominated	
1st MSPA Film Awards	Best Child Artist	Mariyam Yaala Shifau	Won	
1st MSPA Film Awards	Best Playback Singer – Male	Hamoodh Ahmed for "Hithuga Nasha Raany"	Nominated	
1st MSPA Film Awards	Best Playback Singer – Male	Shammoon Mohamed for "Dhuniye Dhauruva"	Nominated	
1st MSPA Film Awards	Best Lyrics	Shammoon Mohamed for "Dhuniye Dhauruva"	Nominated	
1st MSPA Film Awards	Best Editor	Ali Shifau	Nominated	
1st MSPA Film Awards	Best Makeup – Glamour	Hussain Hazim	Nominated	
1st MSPA Film Awards	Best Costume Designer	Hussain Hazim	Nominated	
1st MSPA Film Awards	Best Visual Effects	Ahmed Sinan	Nominated	
1st MSPA Film Awards	Background Score	Mohamed Ikram	Won	

== Sequel ==
In March 2018, Mohamed Ali announced that he intended to develop a sequel of Vakin Loabin, reprising the characters from the original. The sequel is expected to release in 2020.
