= Ali Shazleem =

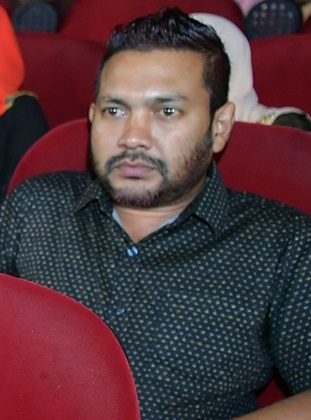
- Shazleem at 9th Gaumee Film Awards ceremony, 2019
- Occupations: Actor, producer, director
- Years active: 2014–present

Ali Shazleem is a Maldivian film actor, director and producer.

== Career ==
Shazleem made his film debut in the Aishath Fuad Thaufeeq-directed Hulhudhaan (2014) alongside Mariyam Majudha, which was a critical success. The film was later screened at the Venice Film Festival. Though Hulhudhaan was released earlier, Shazleem's first project was Maldivian first anthology film Hatharu Halha which got delayed till 2019.

In 2015, Shazleem appeared in the Ali Shifau-directed romantic film Emme Fahu Vindha Jehendhen as a company fraud, alongside Mohamed Jumayyil and Mariyam Majudha. The film which, narrates the struggle and challenges a happily married couple undergo, was the highest grossing Maldivian film of the year, and was a critical success. The following year he starred in another Dark Rain Entertainment production, the Ali Shifau-directed romantic comedy Vaashey Mashaa Ekee (2016) opposite Mohamed Jumayyil and Mariyam Majudha narrating the life of a happily married couple being separated due to the husband's crippling fear of commitment on his wife's pregnancy.

In 2017, Rizwee featured in the Ali Shifau-directed romantic comedy Mee Loaybakee alongside Mohamed Jumayyil and Mariyam Azza. The film, which is considered to include the largest cast in a Maldivian feature film, narrates the story of two ex-lovers sliding into the friend zone with the envy and diffidence they experience amidst a convoluted love-triangle. The film and his performance received mainly positive reviews from critics where Aishath Maaha of Avas called his acting to be "good overall". The film emerged as one of the highest grossing Maldivian films of 2017.

2018 was a dull year for the Maldivian film-industry with regards to 2018 Maldivian presidential election, hence only one film of Shazleem was released during the year; a suspense thriller film Dhevansoora (2018) written and directed by Yoosuf Shafeeu. The film marks Shafeeu's thirtieth direction and features an ensemble cast of twenty-one actors. Revolving around a murder investigation, he played a police officer and the investigation head trying to solve the murder mystery. The film received positive reviews from critics and was considered a "norm-breaker" for the Maldivian cinema. Ahmed Hameed Adam, reviewing from VNews, applauded Shazleem's versatility since he was believed to be "stereotyped" as a comedian. Ismail Nail Rasheed from Raajje.mv wrote: "Though remembered for his comic roles, Shazleem is surprisingly good in the serious role of a policeman". He next starred in a recurring role in the first Maldivian web-series, a romantic drama by Fathimath Nahula, Huvaa which began streaming in November 2018. The series, streamed through the digital platform Baiskoafu, centers around a happy and radiant family which breaks into despairing pieces after a tragic incident that led to an unaccountable loss. The series and his performance as a fraud being arrested for murder, were positively received.

Later during the year, the first Maldivian anthology film was released which featured him in the segment directed by Ali Shifau, titled Foshi. The project was shot in 2013 and digitally released six years later due to several delays in post-production.

== Filmography ==
=== Feature film ===
Year	Title	Role	Notes	Ref(s)
2014	Hulhudhaan	Aasif		
2015	Emme Fahu Vindha Jehendhen	Ahusan		
2016	Vaashey Mashaa Ekee	Adhuham		
2017	Mee Loaybakee	Hassan Shakir		
2018	Dhevansoora	Anees	Also producer	
2019	Goh Raalhu	Ahmed Qalib	Special appearance	
2019	Maamui	Bunny		
2021	Maryam	Ihsaan		
2023	Beeveema	Faisal		

=== Television ===
Year	Title	Role	Notes	Ref(s)
2019	Huvaa	Ali Jihad	Recurring role	
2019–2020	Ehenas	Majid Saleem	Guest role	
2019	Hatharu Halha	Asif's friend	In the segment Foshi	
2019	Maayoos	Shakir's physician	Guest role; "Episode 8"	
2021	Rumi á Jannat	Chintu	Recurring role; 7 episodes	
2021	Nafsu	Imran	Also the director Main role; 10 episodes	
2021–2022	Giritee Loabi	Rasheed	Recurring role; 22 episodes	
2022	Dark Rain Chronicles	Yasir's subordinate	Main role in the segment "Party"	
2023	Hiy Kalaayah Edheythee	Najih	Recurring role; 13 episodes	
2023	Gareena	Yaamin	Recurring role	
2024	Sharthu	Asim	Recurring role; 15 episodes	
2025	Moosun	Adam	Recurring role; 4 episodes	
2026	Ekaniveri Hithakun...	Nooru	Recurring role	

=== Other work ===
Year	Title	Director	Producer	Notes	Ref(s)
2021	Nafsu	Yes		Web series; 10 episodes	
2022	Rimsha	Yes		Web series; 13 episodes	
