= Mohamed Jumayyil =

Maldivian actor

Mohamed Jumayyil Nimal
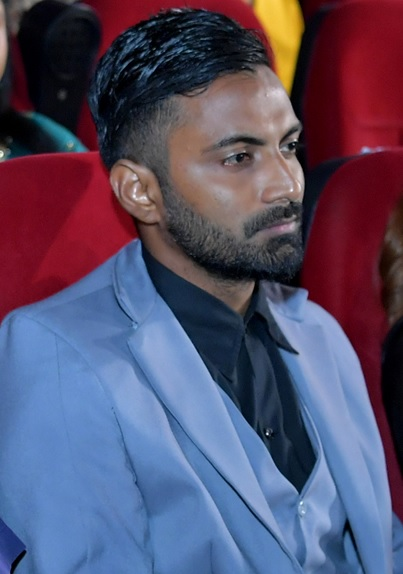
- Jumayyil at 9th Gaumee Film Awards ceremony, 2019
- Born: 19 April 1989 (age 37); Malé
- Occupation: Actor
- Years active: 2014–present

Mohamed Jumayyil Nimal (born 19 April 1989) is a Maldivian actor. He has established a career in Maldives Film Industry and is a recipient of several awards, including two Gaumee Film Awards.

Born in Malé, Jumayyil is the son of the renowned Maldivian film actor and director Ahmed Nimal. After completing his education, Nimal encouraged him to consider a career in the film industry and offered him to play a role in his family drama Aniyaa, which earned him a Gaumee Film Award for Best Male Debut. Subsequently, he caught the attention of Dark Rain Entertainment, leading to significant roles in their romantic films including Emme Fahu Vindha Jehendhen (2015) and Vaashey Mashaa Ekee (2016), both of which secured him nominations for the Gaumee Film Award for Best Actor, ultimately winning the award for the latter.

Jumayyil's collaboration with Dark Rain Entertainment continued with a series of romantic comedies, including Mee Loaybakee (2017) and Vakin Loabin (2018). He later diversified his repertoire by exploring different genres including the crime thriller Goh Raalhu (2019), anthology crime web series Hatharu Halha and the comedy film Maamui (2019). Following controversies related to his personal life, he had experienced changes in his project lineup, with limited film releases.

== Early life ==
Mohamed Jumayyil's father Ahmed Nimal is a prominent figure in the film industry, known for his work as an actor and director. Jumayyil went to Ahmadiyya Pre-school as his first institution and continued his primary education at Jamaluddin School. His secondary education was completed at Dharumavantha School. Following the successful completion of his GCE Ordinary Level exams, Jumayyil's interest in pursuing a career in the film industry was nurtured by his father, Nimal. Recognizing Jumayyil's passion for acting, Nimal provided him with an opportunity to participate in one of the films he directed. During this period, he was a football player at B.G. Sports Club. He also worked at Singapore Airlines Cargo, before shifting his job and working as an Airport check-in staff.

== Career ==
=== 2014–18: Vaashey Mashaa Ekee and romantic roles ===
In 2014, Jumayyil made his film debut in Ahmed Nimal's Aniyaa, where he appeared alongside Niuma Mohamed, Ismail Rasheed and Fathimath Fareela. The film failed to generate much hype during its screening and received mixed-to-positive reviews from critics, achieving moderate success at the box office.

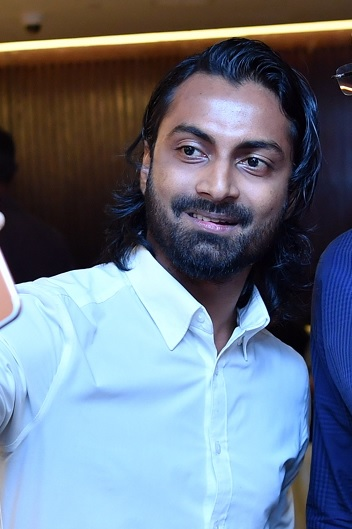
Jumayyil at Niuma Mohamed's Silver Jubilee celebration event, 2019

The subsequent year, Jumayyil appeared in Ali Shifau-directed romantic film Emme Fahu Vindha Jehendhen opposite Mariyam Majudha, where he portrayed the role of Ryan. The film received critical acclaim for its "engaging storyline", with Jumayyil's performance also earning positive feedback. In a pre-premiere review featured in Vaguthu, Ismail Nail lauded the on-screen chemistry between Jumayyil and Majudha and noted significant improvements in Jumayyil's acting compared to his previous work in Aniyaa. The film was the highest-grossing Maldivian release of the year.

Jumayyil next starred in Ali Shifau-directed romantic comedy Vaashey Mashaa Ekee (2016) opposite Mariyam Majudha. In the film, he played the role of Ziyad, a carefree person with a very different personality compared to his partner. His performance garnered positive reviews, with Ahmed Nadheem from Avas noting significant improvement in Jumayyil's acting compared to his previous work. Nadheem even rated Jumayyil on par with Majudha, whom he considered the best actor in the film. The film emerged as one of the highest-grossing films of the year. At the 8th Gaumee Film Awards Jumayyil received the Best Actor award for his role in the film while also earning a nomination for his performance in Emme Fahu Vindha Jehendhen. Additionally, he received the Best Male Debut award for his role in Aniyaa.

Later in the same year, Jumayyil appeared in Fathimath Nahula's horror film 4426, where he portrayed the character Suja, a member of a group of friends trapped in a haunted house. Upon its release, the film received mostly positive reviews from critics. Ahmed Nadheem of Avas praised the film as a "masterpiece" but found Jumayyil's performance to be "average" in his role. 4426 was declared as the highest-grossing Maldivian film of the year.

In 2017, Jumayyil's first release was the Ali Musthafa-directed family drama film Malikaa in which he played the supportive boyfriend of the titular character. Featuring Ismail Zahir, Nuzuhath Shuaib, Fathimath Azifa, Ahmed Asim, Ali Azim and Neena Saleem in prominent roles, the film received mixed reviews from critics. Ahmed Nadheem, reviewing for Avas criticised Jumayyil for "showing no improvement" from his previous film in terms of acting ability. Despite low expectations from trade analysts, the film performed moderately well at the box office. He then starred alongside Mariyam Azza in the romantic comedy film Mee Loaybakee, directed by Ali Shifau. The film became one of the highest-grossing Maldivian films of 2017.

The following year, Jumayyil appeared in Ali Shifau's family drama Vakin Loabin (2018), marking his second collaboration with Nuzuhath Shuaib and his third collaboration with Mariyam Majudha. The film explores the impact of a young couple's divorce on those around them. Upon its release, received positive reviews from critics, particularly for its toned-down melodrama and departure from genre stereotypes. In a pre-premiere review by Raajje.mv, Ismail Naail Nasheed praised the character development and reduced melodrama in the film, highlighting Jumayyil's versatility in portraying a range of emotions.

=== 2019–present: Experiment with different genres ===
Jumayyil's first release in 2019 was the Ahmed Sinan-directed crime thriller Goh Raalhu (2019) which delves into themes of criminality and misdemeanors as a young man strives to prove the sincerity of his love. It received widespread positive reviews from critics, with Aminath Luba of Sun describing it as a "five-star worthy blockbuster film" and wrote: "Jumayyil yet again proved that he is here to stay and entertain the audience with his authentic performance, no matter what the genre is". Furthermore, some reviews also suggested that he excels in crime-related roles over romantic ones. At the 3rd Karnataka International Film Festival, Jumayyil received the Best Actor award for his performance in the film. This was followed by his appearance as a conflicted husband and son in Ali Shifau-directed comedy film Maamui. Upon its release, the film received mainly positive reviews from critics, while Jumayyil's performance was perceived by critics as "good but nothing great". Ifraz Ali from Dho? found the dialogue delivery by Jumayyil to be "unrealistic" in the film. Later in the year, the first Maldivian anthology film was released, featuring Jumayyil as a drug dealer in the segment directed by Ravee Farooq, titled Gaathil. This project, shot in 2013, was digitally released six years later due to post-production delays.

Following controversies related to his personal life, Jumayyil experienced changes in his project lineup, with some roles being reassigned to other contemporary actors. However, he was retained in certain films due to the progress of filming. In 2023, Jumayyil appeared in Ilyas Waheed's crime thriller Nina (2023), where he portrayed the character Zafar. Originally scheduled for a theatrical release in late 2020, the film was postponed due to the COVID-19 pandemic. Upon its eventual release, the film received positive reviews from critics. Akram Abdulla of Dhauru praised it as a thrilling experience with commendable performances, offering an excellent cinematic experience to viewers. The last theatrical release of the year, Dark Rain Entertainment's November featured Jumayyil as a photographer who reinvents himself while searching for his lost love from a fling. Although initially scheduled for release in 2019, the film faced multiple delays during the post-production stage, partly due to the COVID-19 pandemic and also considering rape accusations against Jumayyil. The film and his performance garnered mixed reviews from critics.

== Media image ==
In 2018, he was ranked in the ninth position from Dho?'s list of Top Ten Actor of Maldives.

== Controversy ==
In December 2016, Jumayyil was under investigation on allegations of raping two of his female relatives. The Prosecutor General's Office revealed that charges of sexual assault were not pressed against him as a result of insufficient evidence. Allegations regarding the sexual abuse resurfaced in July 2020 after one of the victim, aged 17 at the time of the abuse, publicly shared a detailed account of the harassment. As a result, production company Dark Rain Entertainment removed him from all pending projects.

On 18 December 2017, a case was filed against Jumayyil at Criminal Court for keeping pornographic material on his phone. Three months later, he was charged with possession of pornography, however, was freed on bail when summoned to court for a remand hearing. In January 2018, Jumayyil was arrested from a cafe in Malé on suspicion of consuming and possessing alcohol.

== Filmography ==
Key
†	Denotes films that have not yet been released

=== Feature film ===
Year	Title	Role	Notes	Ref(s)
2014	Aniyaa	Anil	Gaumee Film Award for Best Male Debut	
2015	Emme Fahu Vindha Jehendhen	Ryan	Nominated—Gaumee Film Award for Best Actor	
2016	Vaashey Mashaa Ekee	Ziyad	Gaumee Film Award for Best Actor	
2016	4426	Suja		
2017	Malikaa	Munaaz		
2017	Mee Loaybakee	Ishan		
2018	Vakin Loabin	Azaan Adam	Nominated—Gaumee Film Award for Best Actor	
2019	Goh Raalhu	Aiman	Karnataka IFF Best Actor in a Feature Film	
2019	Maamui	Salman		
2023	Nina	Zafar "Farey"		
2023	November	Yamaan		
2025	Ilzaam	Adhil		
2025	Koss Gina Mistake	Fazeel		
2026	Paree – Chapter 1			
2026	Paree – Chapter 2			

=== Television and web series ===
Year	Title	Role	Notes	Ref(s)
2019	Karu Hakuru	Himself	Guest role; Episode "Nubai Buri" and "Ten Ants"	
2019	Hatharu Halha	Katey	In the segment Gaathil	
2019–2020	Maayoos	Amir	Main role; 13 episodes	

== Discography ==
Year	Film	Song	Co-artist(s)
2015	Emme Fahu Vindha Jehendhen	"Chaaley"	

== Accolades ==
Year	Award	Category	Nominated work	Result	Ref(s)
2017	8th Gaumee Film Awards	Best Actor	Vaashey Mashaa Ekee	Won	
2017	8th Gaumee Film Awards	Best Actor	Emme Fahu Vindha Jehendhen	Nominated	
2017	8th Gaumee Film Awards	Best Male Debut	Aniyaa	Won	
2019	9th Gaumee Film Awards	Best Actor	Vakin Loabin	Nominated	
2023	3rd Karnataka International Film Festival	Best Actor – Feature Films	Goh Raalhu	Won	
2025	1st MSPA Film Awards	Best Lead Actor – Male	Goh Raalhu	Won	
2025	1st MSPA Film Awards	Best Lead Actor – Male	Vakin Loabin	Nominated	
2025	1st MSPA Film Awards	Best Supporting Actor – Male	Maamui	Nominated	
