= Music of the Maldives =

The Music of the Maldives, an island nation in the Indian Ocean, is marked mainly by Indian, East African, and Arab influences.

== Maldivian (Dhivehi) Poetry Forms ==
- Bandhi – Short, witty verses often used for satire, riddles, or clever expressions in oral tradition.
- Kaa – Rhythmic, call-and-response poetry traditionally used in group activities and communal work.
- Farihi – Light, playful poetry, usually humorous or teasing in tone.
- Raivari (Raivaru) – The most classical Dhivehi poetic form, with strict rules of meter, syllables, and rhyme; traditionally recited.
- Lhen – A general term for poetry or verse, covering multiple poetic styles in Dhivehi literature.
- Ambaa – Chant-like rhythmic poetry associated with music, drums, and celebrations.
- Lava – Song-based poetry, flexible in structure and commonly used for emotional and lyrical expression.

== Traditional performances ==
Nashid performing at the Zero Degree Atoll reunion show "Sound of a Nation" at Alimas Carnival in Male'

The most widely known form of indigenous music is called boduberu. It is also the most popular, especially in the Northern Atolls. It is said to have appeared in the Maldives in about the 11th century and that it may have East African origins. It is a dance music, performed by about fifteen people, including a lead singer and three percussionists, as well as a bell and a small stick of bamboo with horizontal grooves called an onugandu.

Boduberu songs begin with a slow beat, eventually entering a frenetic crescendo accompanied by frenetic dancing. Lyrics can be about any number of subjects and often include vocables (meaningless syllables).

Thaara music is performed by about 22 people seated in two rows opposite each other. It is performed only by men and is somewhat religious. Like boduberu, thaara songs begin slowly and come to a peak. Thaara is said to have arrived with Arabs who came from the Persian Gulf in the middle of the 17th century.

Gaa odi lava is a special type of song performed after the completion of manual labor. It was said to have been invented during the reign of Sultan Mohamed Imadudeen I (1620–1648) for the workers who built defenses for the city of Malé.

In the early 20th century, during the reign of Sultan Muhammad Shamsuddeen III, the Maldives experienced a vibrant cultural transformation. It was in this rich historical context that the youth of the islands began to explore and innovate in the realm of music, leading to the emergence of a unique musical form known as langiri. This new genre was significantly influenced by thaara, a traditional style of music that served as its primary source. The youth, eager to express their creativity and cultural identity, adapted and modified the performance techniques associated with thaara infusing their interpretations and styles into the music. As a result, langiri not only represented a musical evolution but also a reflection of the changing social dynamics and the artistic aspirations of the Maldivian youth during this period.

The bolimalaafath neshun is a dance performed by women on special occasions or when giving gifts to the sultan. These gifts, most often shells, are kept in an intricately decorated box or vase called the kurandi malaafath. About twenty-four women typically participate in small groups of two to six. They march towards the sultan, singing songs of patriotism or loyalty. Since becoming a republic in 1968, this dance is no longer performed for any sultan, since one no longer exists.

Another women's dance is called maafathi neshun, which is similar to langiri. It is performed by women dancing in two rows of ten each, carrying a semi-circular string with fake flowers attached.

A dance called fathigandu jehun is performed by either one person or a group of men, using two pieces of short bamboo sticks to accompany the dancers and a drummer, who also sings. These songs are typically epics, most famously one called Burunee Raivaru..

Bandiyaa jehun is perhaps related to the Indian pot dance, and is performed by women. Dancers mark the beat with a metal water pot while wearing metal rings. Modern groups perform either standing or sitting and have added drums and harmonicas.

Kulhudhuffushi (on Haa Dhaalu Atoll) is known for kadhaamaali, which is performed with numerous drums and a kadhaa, which is made of a copper plate and rod. About thirty men take part, dressed in costumes of evil spirits (maali). Kadhaamaali is associated with a traditional walk around the island late at night by the elders to ward off maali This walk lasted for three days, followed by music and dancing.

== Popular songs and dances ==
Electric bulbul tarang playing

Maldivians feel some affinity to Northern India through their language, which is related to the languages of North India. Most older generation or traditional Maldivians like to watch Hindi movies from the 1960s or 70s and like to listen to the songs of those movies. The reason is that out of a similar language, similar rhythms and cadences develop. It is very easy for Maldivians to fit local lyrics to a Hindi tune because of this cultural closeness. For example, the Hindi words Ek din ("one day") are changed to E kudin (those kids) in Dhivehi, and in this manner, a new local song develops.

Before cable TV, the most popular radio programmes from the Voice of Maldives (VOM) were those broadcasting older Hindi songs, like Vakivumuge kurin ("Before the breakup"). On rural islands, Hindi songs are still the most popular songs, especially the older ones from Mohammed Rafi, Mukesh, Lata Mangeshkar, Asha Bhonsle, Hemant Kumar and Kishore Kumar. Therefore, most popular Maldivian songs are based in (or influenced by) Hindi songs.

Similarly, the few popular local dances are based on North Indian dances, especially Kathak..

The favorite musical instrument of Maldivians, besides the drum, is the bulbul tarang, a kind of horizontal accordion. This instrument is also used to accompany devotional songs, like Maadhaha. Singers like Naifaru Dohokko became famous through songs with bulbul music in the background. The first bulbuls were brought from Calcutta in the early 19th century. Influences from North Indian music and dances date back to that time. They did not begin broadcasting Hindi songs on the radio until the 1960s and 1970s.

There are also female singers producing traditional songs; among them, the most popular were Fareeda Hasan and Jēmuge Donkamanaa, whose songs continue to be cherished by Maldivians, although both women have died.

== Religious songs ==
Formerly, in the islands of Maldives, there was a festival called Maulūdu, where religious songs were sung by groups of males within a pavilion (haruge) specially built for the occasion. When a Maulūd was arranged, local islanders had to build a large, open-sided pavilion with wooden poles. They would thatch it with coconut-palm fronds and decorate it with oil lamps and special patchwork draperies. On the day of the event, special food would be prepared and beautifully displayed for the benefit of the Maulūd singers and a great number of guests coming from their rival island (or village), in their best dresses, on festively decorated boats. Here, the host islanders had to prove themselves hospitable in the preparations and accommodation to be able to compare favorably when it was their turn to receive hospitality in the rival island on a similar occasion. Another name for religious songs is madhaha.

== Modern music ==
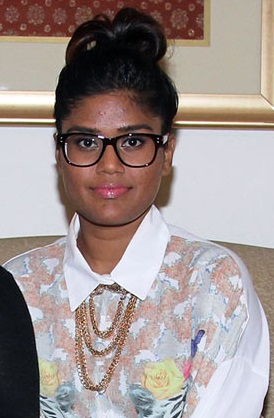
Unoosha, Maldivian singer and songwriter

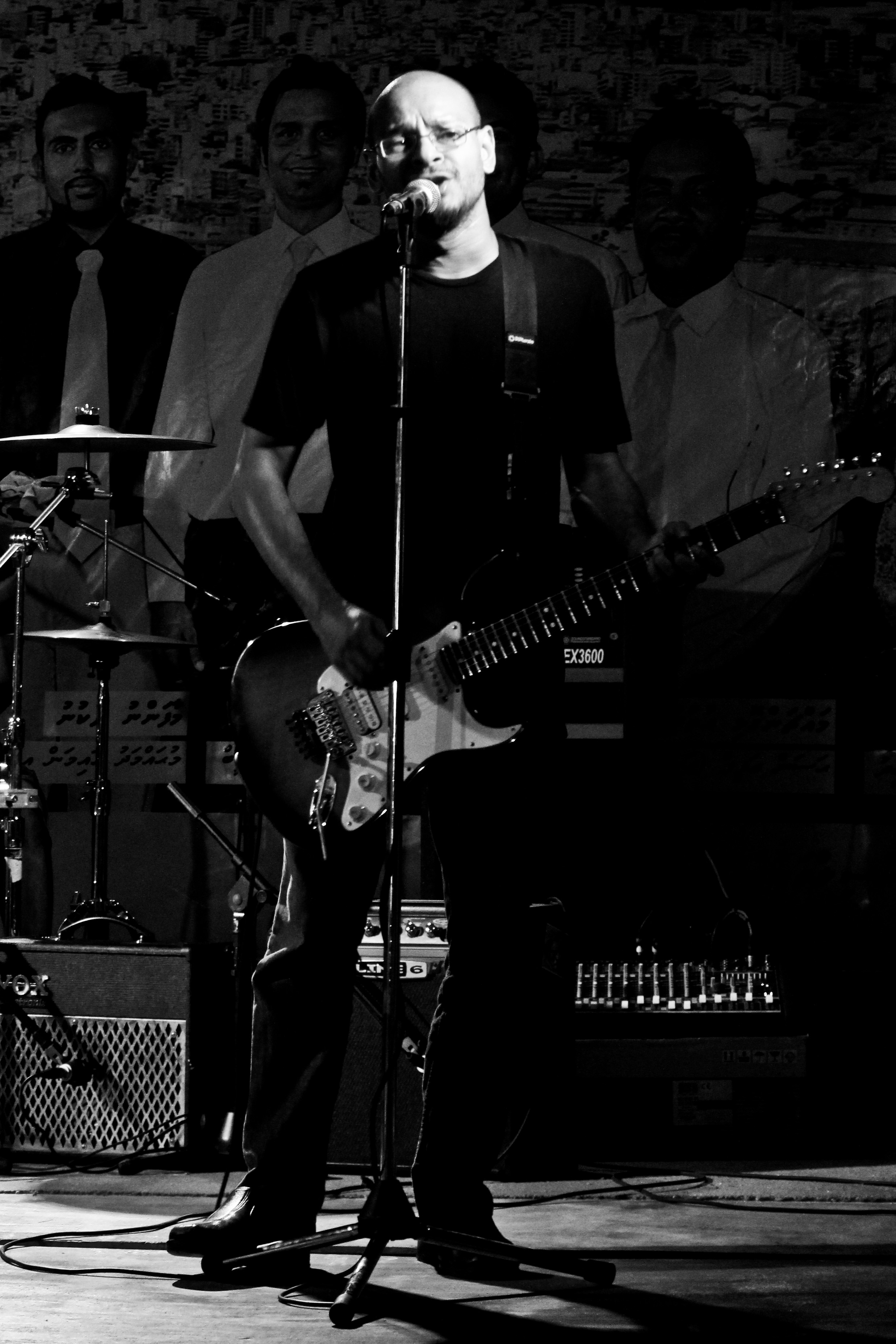
Ahmed Faseeh Performing live in Hulhumale, 2011

Hussain Shihab, formerly a musician and now the minister of state for arts, wrote a song to a foreign tune. This song was named hiy Adhu Roneeyey Nudhashey, which he admitted in a program broadcast on the anniversary of Television Maldives (TVM). Western music is more popular in the capital, as in any global city.

However, popular music has shifted from plagiarizing to more original concepts. The Dhivehi band Zero Degree Atoll released an album named Dhoni ("Traditional Maldivian Boat"). This album had roots in folk and ancient arts such as Raivaru, a type of traditional poetry where letters are swapped to be sung in a certain melody. The album was a huge success, followed by its remake with few new songs in 1997, the album titled Island Pulse recorded in France. The band had a huge impact on the local population, which unofficially claimed it as the saviors of traditional Dhivehi musical art and the pioneers of modern Dhivehi music.

Another famous band is the Trio Band. Thetrio's first performance was in the Dhanberu Live show, where they performed the well-known songs Chaaley, Raarukuga, an d Ey Manjey. The trio has a unique style for a young band. Lately, they became a boduberu-style band. Trio Band's Lead Vocalist is Moosa Shifau.

Many other bands and local performers have kept up the tradition. It is believed that the state-sponsored radio and TV grew more in favor of foreign musicwhen most quintessential Dhivehi musicians started including political content in their lyrics.

Such lyricists include Easa of Sea Child, who was jailed for drug-related issues. Although Easa is not regarded professionally, many of his songs have been stolen and sung. While serving time at Maafushi, he is said to have written more than a hundred songs. Songs such as Jamalegge Soora ("face of a camel"), Filavalhu ("lesson"), Fangivinun (a collaboration of folk and an original Raivaru), Insaana ("the Human") and Govaali Adu are very prominent among musicians, and in the underground music scene.
