= Alifaan =

2025 Maldivian film

- Official film poster
- Directed by: Ravee Farooq; Ali Shifau
- Written by: Ahmed Tholal
- Produced by: Mohamed Ali; Aishath Fuwad
- Starring: Ravee Farooq; Sharaf Abdulla; Sheela Najeeb; Maiha Adam; Moosa Aleef; Hazif Mohamed
- Cinematography: Ahmed Zifaaf
- Edited by: Ali Shifau; Ravee Farooq
- Music by: Hussain Thaufeeq
- Production company: Dark Rain Entertainment
- Release date: 6 October 2025
- Running time: 95 minutes
- Country: Maldives
- Language: Dhivehi

Alifaan (lit fire) is a 2025 Maldivian action thriller film co-edited and co-directed by Ravee Farooq and Ali Shifau. Co-produced by Mohamed Ali and Aishath Fuwad under Dark Rain Entertainment, the film stars Ravee Farooq, Sharaf Abdulla, Sheela Najeeb, Maiha Adam, Moosa Aleef and Hazif Mohamed in pivotal roles. The film was released on 6 October 2025.

== Cast ==
- Ravee Farooq as Ibrahim
- Sharaf Abdulla as Rado
- Sheela Najeeb as Fareedha
- Maiha Adam as Maree
- Moosa Aleef as Meem
- Hazif Mohamed
- Mohamed Faisal as Saatu
- Adam Rizwee as Ah'be
- Jam Allo
- Aminath Shuha as Reesha
- Ahmed Shakir
- Saamee Hussain Didi
- Aishath Razan Ramiz
- Yes-E
- Mohamed Afrah
- Ali Nadheeh
- Mariyam Majudha
- Mohamed Rifshan
- Aminath Aseela (Special Appearance)
- Jadhulla Ismail (Special Appearance)

== Development ==
Following the release of the revenge action thriller film Fureytha (2024), Dark Rain Entertainment announced their next project, an action thriller directed by Ravee Farooq and Ali Shifau, tentatively titled Project 37. In April 2025, the official title of the film was revealed to be Alifaan. Filming began in August 2024 and was completed on 11 February 2025. On 29 April 2025, Dark Rain Entertainment announced the release date of the film as 6 October 2025.

Cast of the film were announced to be Maiha Adam, Ravee Farooq, Sheela Najeeb, Adam Rizwee, Moosa Aleef, Ahmed Shakir and Mohamed Hazif. In January 2025, it was reported that model Jam Allo also joined cast. Allo plays the role of an ex-military officer and bodyguard, and he agreed to take on the role because the project does not feature overdramatic dialogue and is more of an action-packed thriller. Najeeb described her performance as very "challenging" due to the abusive dialogue and the heavy makeup required for her character.

== Release and reception ==
The film was theatrically released on 6 October 2025. It received positive reviews from critics. Fathimath Ahulam from Hurihaa commended the combination of visual effects and cinematography, while particularly praising the performances of Sheela Najeeb and Sharaf Abdulla. Similarly, Oyaa published a review highlighting Najeeb's performance and the makeup work by Hassan for her character, stating: "With Hassan's work on Sheela's character, she has outperformed herself and proved that no one could portray this intense role better than her". The review also praised Sharaf's performance as "never seen before".
