= Aishath Lahfa =

Maldivian film actress (b. 1997)

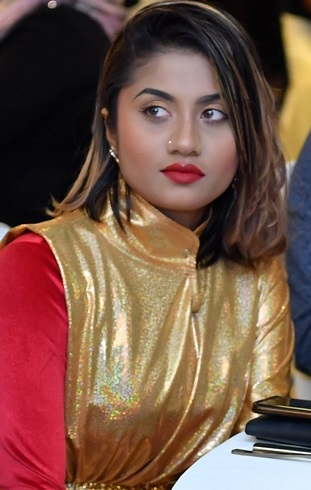
- Born: 21 November 1997 (age 28); K. Kaashidhoo
- Occupation: Actress
- Years active: 2021–present

Aishath Lahfa (born 21 November 1997) is a Maldivian film actress. Before pursuing a career in acting, Lahfa was an active TikTok user, which won her recognition as a performer. She made her acting debut in the web series Girlfriends (2021) and continued playing main roles in several other web series including four-part anthology crime web series Mazloom (2021–2022), family romantic dramas Rimsha (2022) and Yasna (2022). In 2023, she made her first appearance in a feature film with the horror film Kalhaki.

== Career ==
Before pursuing a career in acting, Lahfa was an active TikTok user, which won her recognition as a performer. In 2021, she first appeared as one of the three roommates in Ibrahim Wisan's Girlfriends (2021). Next, she worked with Ilyas Waheed for his four-part anthology web series Mazloom. In the series she played the role of Rau, a supportive friend of a young woman (played by Mariyam Azza) who was forced into human trafficking. Mariyam Waheedha from Dhen praised the performance of Lahfa, while calling the chapter an "honorable conclusion" to a benchmark project.

She next collaborated with Mohamed Aboobakuru for Ali Shazleem-directed family drama Rimsha where she played the titular role, a victim of a family devious plan. The series nor her performance received much recognition from the critics. This was followed by Aminath Rinaza and Ali Rasheed's family drama web series Yasna, where she played a similar role; an unfortunate woman whose fate brings her closer to her ex-lover though her current situation forces her to drive him away from her life. The series received mixed reviews where the critics found the screenplay to be slow and dragging while the actors tried to give their best in an otherwise over the top melodrama.

In 2023, Yoosuf Shafeeu released his horror film Kalhaki in which, Lahufa played the role of a Lamha, one of the friends who embark on a holiday getaway, only to find their trip turning into a horrifying nightmare as bizarre events unfold. The film received mixed to positive reviews from critics. Aminath Luba reviewing from The Press praised her performance, especially considering it was her big-screen debut. Luba highlighted: "Apart from her facial expressions, the scene where she walks upside down is a major highlight of her acting ability".

== Filmography ==
=== Feature film ===
Year	Title	Role	Notes	Ref(s)
2023	Kalhaki	Lamha		

=== Television ===
Year	Title	Role	Notes	Ref(s)
2021	Girlfriends	Hawwa Ibrahim	Main role; 12 episodes	
2021–2022	Mazloom	Rau	Main role in "Chapter 4: Hintha"	
2022	Bridge	Areesha	Guest role; "Episode 10"	
2022	Rimsha	Rimsha	Main role; 13 episodes	
2022	Yasna	Yasna	Main role; 15 episodes	
2024	Sharthu	Thara	Main role; 15 episodes	
