= Hama Emme Meehekey =

- Written by: Ameena Mohamed
- Directed by: Ameena Mohamed
- Country of origin: Maldives
- Original language: Divehi
- No. of seasons: 1
- No. of episodes: 10

Production
- Producer: Hassan Adam
- Cinematography: Ibrahim Moosa; Mohamed Aiman
- Editor: Rafhan Shareef
- Running time: 18-24 minutes

Original release
- Network: Baiskoafu
- Release: June 15 – November 28, 2023

Hama Emme Meehekey is a Maldivian web series written and directed by Ameena Mohamed. It stars Dheena Ahmed, Mariyam Waheedha, Ahmed Asim and Ravee Farooq in main roles. The pilot episode of the series was released on 15 June 2023. The series explores the life of a divorced woman torn between her past with her soon-to-be-committed ex-husband and the romantic interest of a former colleague.

Filming for the first five episodes of the series took place in Male' from March to April 2023 during the period of Ramazan. It marks Ameena's second collaboration with Dheena and Mariyam after their comedy web series Office Loabi released in 2022.

== Cast and characters ==
=== Main ===
- Dheena Ahmed as Shaahin; a single mother who is confused about her relationship with his ex-husband and boyfriend.
- Mariyam Waheedha as Nadheema; a friend of Shaahin, known for her involvement in gossip, and married to a wealthy businessman.
- Ahmed Asim as Hassan; the ex-husband of Shaahin who starts another relationship with Sama, but is unable to get over Shaahin.
- Ravee Farooq as Ahmed Ameen Saleem; a wise person and an ex-colleague of Shaahin who is divorced from his wife.

=== Recurring ===
- Lais as Mash; the child of Shaahin and Hassan.
- Aminath Shuha as Sama; the current girlfriend of Hassan.
- Rafhan Shareef as Rafhan

=== Guest ===
- Mohamed Afrah as Shahid; Nadheema's husband (episode 9)

== Episodes ==
No.	Title	Directed by	Original release date
1	"Episode 1"	Ameena Mohamed	June 15, 2023
Shaahin is a single mother who has been divorced from her husband, Hassan, for nearly a year. Despite Hassan starting a new relationship with a woman named Sama, Shaahin and Hassan maintain a surprisingly close bond even after their separation. However, their connection faces a significant test when Hassan reveals that he has initiated the process to finalize their divorce, leaving Shaahin heartbroken.
2	"Episode 2"	Ameena Mohamed	June 24, 2023
Shaahin remains emotionally attached to Hassan, even though they both understand that they will never reconcile as a couple. They continue to care for each other's well-being and are involved in each other's lives, particularly regarding their respective relationships. During this time, Shaahin reconnects with an old friend, Ameen, who, like her, is also divorced from his spouse.
3	"Episode 3"	Ameena Mohamed	June 29, 2023
Shaahin starts feeling a bit uneasy about Ameen as he becomes a bit too clingy for her liking. At the behest of her best friend, Nadheema, Shaahin agrees to go on a lunch date with Ameen, and it goes quite well. However, on her way back, Shaahin unexpectedly encounters Hassan with Sama, and this deeply unsettles her, realizing he prioritizes Sama over their child.
4	"Episode 4"	Ameena Mohamed	July 6, 2023
Ameen rents an apartment near Shaahin's place, and they begin spending more time together. Unexpectedly, Shaahin receives a call from Sama, who wants to meet with her, leaving Shaahin feeling uneasy about Sama's intentions.
5	"Episode 5"	Ameena Mohamed	July 13, 2023
Sama pays Shaahin a visit and earnestly asks her to persuade Hassan to move on, as she envisions a better future with him. Meanwhile, Hassan and Ameen each plan separate birthday celebrations for Shaahin. Hassan opts for a romantic dinner that takes an unexpected turn, leading to intimacy between them. Unbeknownst to them, Ameen arrives at their doorstep, unaware of what's transpiring inside.
6	"Episode 6"	Ameena Mohamed	October 17, 2023
Nadhee is upset with Shaahin for showing disrespect to Ameen. Sama feels insecure about Hassan's relationship with Shaahin and suspects an affair, especially when Hassan didn't return home the night before his trip to Singapore. Nadhee attempts to mend Shaahin's relationship with Ameen, but his stubbornness makes it challenging to make amends.
7	"Episode 7"	Ameena Mohamed	October 24, 2023
Shaahin offers an apology to Ameen for ghosting him on her birthday, but he finds it less than convincing. While Hassan is away, Shaahin remains in constant contact with him. Hassan, feeling overwhelmed by Sama's obsession, requests a break from their relationship. Sama, however, becomes increasingly convinced that Hassan is having an affair with Shaahin.
8	"Episode 8"	Ameena Mohamed	November 14, 2023
Despite Nadheema's persistent attempts to open Shaahin's eyes to the truth, Shaahin continues to be enamored by Hassan's love. Sama is troubled by the recent distance in her relationship with Hassan, and he confesses his feelings of helplessness. Sama encourages him to try again to mend their relationship. Ameen pays a visit to Shaahin, and they engage in casual conversation, strengthening their bond.
9	"Episode 9"	Ameena Mohamed	November 21, 2023
Hassan and Shaahin contemplate their fate, with Hassan feeling insecure about Shaahin's proximity to Ameen, while Shaahin remains oblivious to her connection with Hassan. A call from the Court to settle their divorce case adds tension. Ameen seeks progress in their relationship, but Shaahin is still grappling with lingering feelings for Hassan.
10	"Episode 10"	Ameena Mohamed	November 28, 2023
In the midst of confusion, Shaahin grapples with decisions about her life and relationships. Eventually, Shaahin and Hassan decide to forge their own path and confront reality. Shaahin opens up about her feelings to Ameen, while Hassan reunites with Sama.

== Soundtrack ==
Track listing
No.	Title	Singer(s)	Length
1.	"Hama Emme Meehekey"	Humble Bakari

== Release and reception ==
The first episode of the series was released on 15 June 2023 through Baiskoafu. The series received generally good reviews from critics, with particular praise for the performances of Dheena Ahmed and Mariyam Waheedha.
