= Shalabee Ibrahim =

Maldivian singer (born 1997)

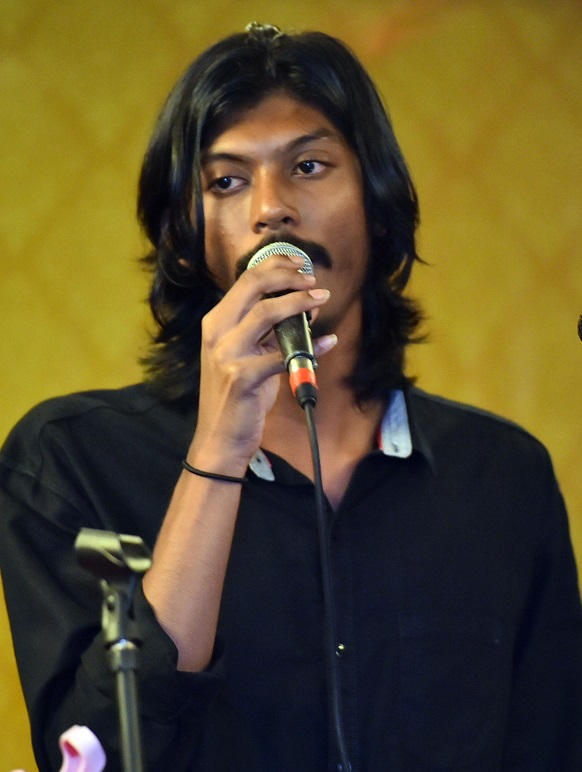
- Shalabee at Niuma Mohamed 's Silver Jubilee celebration event, 2019
- Born: 30 May 1997 (age 29); M. Mulah, Maldives
- Education: Al-Madhrasathul Arabiyyathul Islamiyya
- Occupations: Playback singer; songwriter
- Years active: 2015–present
- Spouse: Shifa Ibrahim (m. )
- Children: 2
- Musical career
- Genres: Pop; filmi; boduberu; electronic
- Instrument: Vocals
- Website: shalabee.com

Shalabee Ibrahim (born March 30, 1997) is a Maldivian singer. Born in Mulah, Maldives, his career began upon participating in the reality show Maldivian Idol (2016), in which he was awarded as the first runner up of the show.

== Early life and career ==
=== 1997–2012: School life ===
Shalabee Ibrahim studied from Al-Madhrasathul Arabiyyathul Islamiyya. He was a prefect and participated in several Quran reciting competitions. He participated in the National Quran Competition for more than 9 times and has repeatedly being awarded; also winning the 2nd place from the whole competition once. Regarding his studies, Ibrahim said; "It was good till grade 9. Afterwards, I quit. I always have to get ready for the exams after memorising something. I never understand it to that extent, and there is a lack of interest". After completing grade 9, he found a new interest in boduberu and started performing boduberu along with some of his friends.

=== 2015–present: Maldivian Idol and beyond ===
In 2015, Ibrahim participated in the Boduberu Challenge, where he was the lead singer of the boduberu group Dhammaanu. At the end of the show, he was awarded as the best singer of the season. The same year, he auditioned for the first season of Maldivian Idol and was chosen as the first runner-up of the show. A while after the results were declared, Shalabee’s manager Ali Amir refused to accept the results of the show and demanded to publicize the results of votes. However, a day later the team decided to move forward with the agreement that was made along with Public Service Media, which involves talent managing programs for a span of two years.

On 30 June 2016, Ibrahim released his first studio album. Titled Hidhaaee Noor, it was an album of hymns and was launched by Maumoon Abdul Gayoom who also penned lyrics for one of the songs from the album.

== Philanthropy ==
Besides his career in music, Ibrahim has also showed interest in contributing to various charities. In 2016, he decided to cover study related costs of a special needs child for 1 year.

== Discography ==
=== Feature film ===
Year	Film	Song	Lyricist(s)	Co-Artist(s)	Notes
2016	4426	"Vakiveema Dheravaaney"	Mausoom Shakir	Solo	Appears in Soundtrack album
2016	4426	"Loabivaayaanulaa" (Cover Version)	Mausoom Shakir	Mira Mohamed Majid	Appears in Soundtrack album
2016	4426	"Ufaa Dhin Jaadhuvee Reyrey" (Cover Version)	Fathimath Nahula	Mira Mohamed Majid	Appears in Soundtrack album
2017	Hahdhu	"Thaubaa Vamey"	Mohamed Abdul Ghanee (Arabic verse by Ismail Mubarik)	Mohamed Abdul Ghanee, Hussain Ali, Ibrahim Zaid Ali, Abdulla Nashif	
2017	Bos	"Veynthakun Dhin"	Adam Haleem Adnan	Mariyam Ashfa	
2023	Beeveema	"Beeveemaa"	Ahmed Zareer	Mariyam Ashfa	
2023	Beeveema	"Hiyy Adhu Roneeyey"	Hussain Shihab	Mariyam Ashfa	
2025	Sorry	"Hithugaa Thi Soora Vaaney" (Duet Version)	Adam Haleem Adnan	Mariyam Ashfa	
2025	Sorry	"Hithugaa Thi Soora Vaaney" (Promotional Song)	Adam Haleem Adnan	Mariyam Ashfa, Zahil Ibrahim Rameez	Appears in Soundtrack album
2025	Sorry	"Hithugaa Thi Soora Vaaney" (Solo Version)	Adam Haleem Adnan	Solo	Appears in Soundtrack album
2025	Lily	"Gislaa Roi Kiyamey Alwadhaau"	Mohamed Abdul Ghanee	Aminath Laisa Hilmy	
2026	Majunoon	"Dheewaanaa Vumun"	Abdulla Shahidh (Teddy)	Solo	

=== Television ===
Year	Title	Song	Lyricist(s)	Co-artist(s)	Notes
2019	Huvaa (Season 1)	"Mivaa Gotheh"	Mausoom Shakir	Mariyam Ashfa	

=== Non-Film songs ===
Year	Album/single	Song	Lyricist(s)	Co-Artist(s)
2014	Single	"Thee Theeye Magey" (Cover Version)	Afeefa Ahmed	Mira Mohamed Majid
2014	Single	"Bunebalaa Loabivey" (Cover Version)	Easa Shareef	Mira Mohamed Majid, Yaamin Rasheed, Hawwa Ashra
2015	Enme Reethi: S01	"Neyngi Hithey Gendhevee"	Easa Shareef	Mira Mohamed Majid
2016	Ehan'dhaanugai Covers	"Vevunee Loaiybey Yaaru Huvaa"	Mohamed Abdul Ghanee	Mariyam Ashfa
2016	Enme Reethi: S02	"Heelun Thi Foruvee"	Ahmed Shakeeb	Hawwa Ashra
2017	Single	"Aadheys"	Hussain Rasheed (Bilky)	Solo
2017	Single	"Hoadhey Raanee" (Cover Version)	Ahmed Zareer	Solo
2017	Single	"Fisaari Firihenakeemu"		Solo
2017	Single	"Bune Roveneeyey" (Cover Version)	Mausoom Shakir	Solo
2017	Single	"Beynumey Ishqaa" (Cover Version)	Kopee Mohamed Rasheed	Solo
2017	Single	"Beynunvanee"		Mira Mohamed Majid
2017	Single	"Mammaa Ey Aslee Hiyy Magey"		Solo
2017	Goyye	"Jazubaathu"		Solo
2017	Rhythm: S01	"Aadheys" (Unplugged Version)	Hussain Rasheed (Bilky)	Solo
2017	Rhythm: S01	"Dhoovevunee" (Cover Version)		Solo
2017	Rhythm: S01	"Saharoa" (Cover Version)		Solo
2018	Single	"Mi Moosun Mi Han'dhuvaru"	Raziyya Hassan	Rafiyath Rameeza
2018	Single	"Thibaa Heelumun"		Solo
2018	Single	"Heelaa"		Solo
2018	Single	"Magey Khaassa Dharifulhaa"	Nasma Abdul Muhsin	Solo
2018	Eid Mubarak 1439	"Eid Mubarak"		Solo
2018	Dhivehi Fuluhunge 85th Anniversary	"Jehilunvumeh Nethi Azumugaa"		Shifa Thaufeeq, Yaamin Rasheed
2018	Ran Han'dhaanugai: S03	"Isve Vee Loabi En'geyneyhe"	Ahmed Shakeeb	Solo
2018	Ran Han'dhaanugai: S03	"Kobaa Kureege Huvaathah"	Ahmed Shakeeb	Solo
2018	Ran Han'dhaanugai: S03	"Mulhi Jaan Hithaa"	Easa Shareef	Solo
2018	Ran Han'dhaanugai: S03	"Saadhaa Thi Moonaa Lolaa"	Easa Shareef	Samaha Moosa
2018	Single	"Velidhoo Velidhoo"		Solo
2018	Single	"Shaheedhunge Zikuraa" (Cover Version)	Adam Haleem Adnan	Solo
2019	Single	"Minivan Vayaa Kulhelaashe" (Cover Version)		Solo
2020	Single	"Ilaahee Mibin" (Cover Version)	Abdul Rasheed Hussain	Various Artists
2020	Qaumee Dhuvas 1442	"Naseyhatheh"	Ameena Mufeed	Various Artists
2020	Single	"Dhinee Zaharu Mithuraa"		Shifa Thaufeeq
2020	Koalhimaa	"Koalhimaa"		Tro, Shaxxe
2020	Koalhimaa	"Maadhamaa"		Tro, Inte, Jantz
2020	Single	"Loabin Bunan Ai"	Abdulla Moosa Rafeeu	Solo
2021	Geveshi Gulhun	"Geveshi Gulhun" (Theme Song)		Mohamed Abdul Ghanee, Ibrahim Zaid Ali
2021	Single	"Loabi Mudharrisge Zikuraa"		Solo
2021	Single	"Loabivaathee"		Solo
2021	Old Is Gold: Vol. 2	"Ufaavaa Zamaaney"	Hussain Rasheed	Solo
2021	Single	"Shikaara Kollee"	Mohamed Abdul Ghanee	Mariyam Ashfa
2021	Adhives Reethi 1442	"Asthaa" (Cover Version)		Solo
2021	Adhives Reethi 1442	"Ey Balhin'dhaa" (Cover Version)	Jameela Saleem	Solo
2021	Adhives Reethi 1442	"Ey Loabivaa Malaa" (Cover Version)		Solo
2021	Adhives Reethi 1442	"Haalu" (Cover Version)		Solo
2021	Adhives Reethi 1442	"Raabe" (Cover Version)		Solo
2022	Single	"Oh Nadhaa" (Cover Version)	Adam Haleem Adnan	Solo
2022	Single	"Faiymini"	Ali Waheed	Solo
2023	Single	"Ai Ufaa Minivan Haqeeqee" (Cover Version)		Solo
2023	Single	"Loabin Naanaa Ey"	Abdulla As'adhu	Solo
2023	Single	"Mirey Beehileemaa" (Cover Version)	Easa Shareef	Rafiyath Rameeza
2024	Raagu: S06	"Hiyy Athulaifiyey"		Solo
2024	Single	"Saahibaa Bunelan Hiyy Edhey"	Amr	Solo

=== Religious / Madhaha ===
Year	Album/single	Song	Lyricist(s)	Co-artist(s)
2016	Hidhaaee Noor	"Hidhaayathuge Dhanmaru"	Maumoon Abdul Gayoom	Solo
2016	Hidhaaee Noor	"Alhuge Haalu"	Adam Naseer Ibrahim	Solo
2016	Hidhaaee Noor	"Zikuru Kurumuge Maaiykan"	Adam Naseer Ibrahim	Solo
2016	Hidhaaee Noor	"Naseebuge Sirru"	Adam Naseer Ibrahim	Solo
2016	Hidhaaee Noor	"Thiya Maaiy Loabeegaa"	Adam Naseer Ibrahim	Solo
2016	Hidhaaee Noor	"Dhe Aalamah Mathiveri Nabiyyaa"	Hassan Shakir Mohamed	Solo
2016	Hidhaaee Noor	"Hidhaaee Nooru"	Adam Abdul Rahman	Solo
2017	Hidhaaee Noor 2	"Hamdhaa Sanaa"		Solo
2017	Hidhaaee Noor 2	"Ramadange Asaru"		Solo
2017	Hidhaaee Noor 2	"Naseyhatheh"		Solo
2017	Hidhaaee Noor 2	"Mamma"		Solo
2017	Hidhaaee Noor 2	"Dhuniyeyge Soora"		Solo
2017	Hidhaaee Noor 2	"Badhuruge Mathiveri Zikuraa"		Solo
2017	Hidhaaee Noor 2	"Ey Akhaaey"		Solo
2019	Hidhaaee Noor 3	"Mammaa Ey"		Solo
2019	Hidhaaee Noor 3	"Magey Loabivaa Bappaa"		Solo
2019	Hidhaaee Noor 3	"7 Suvaalu"		Solo
2019	Hidhaaee Noor 3	"Nikamethi Insaanaa"		Solo
2019	Hidhaaee Noor 3	"Thoaifge Aniyaa ah Rasoolaa Dhevvi Jazaa"		Solo
2019	Hidhaaee Noor 3	"Allah ge Mathiverikan"		Solo
2019	Hidhaaee Noor 3	"Yaa Ilaahi Ey"		Solo
2021	Hidhaaee Noor 4	"Roadhaey Roadhaey"		Solo
2021	Hidhaaee Noor 4	"Ey Rasoolaa"		Solo
2021	Hidhaaee Noor 4	"Ey Saahibaa"		Solo
2021	Hidhaaee Noor 4	"Emuneyshiey"		Solo
2021	Hidhaaee Noor 4	"Eemaaney Hithugaa Aalaavanee"		Solo
2021	Hidhaaee Noor 4	"Maruhabaa Yaa Ramadan"		Nihaan
2021	Hidhaaee Noor 4	"Ummathuge Aadheys"		Abdulla Fareed
2021	Hidhaaee Noor 4	"Mamma"		Abdulla Fareed
2026	Dhanmaru	"Faidhaa Hayaathah Hoadhamaa"	Abdul Raheem Abdulla	Solo

=== Studio albums ===
Title	Album details	Ref.
Hidhaaee Noor	Released: 30 June 2016; Label: —; Composer(s): Shalabee Ibrahim; Writer(s): Maumoon Abdul Gayoom, Adam Naseer Ibrahim, Hassan Shakir Mohamed, Adam Abdul Rahman; Formats: CD	

== Filmography ==
Year	Title	Role	Notes	Ref(s)
2023	November	Passenger	Special appearance	
