= Kalhaki =

- Official film poster
- Directed by: Yoosuf Shafeeu
- Written by: Yoosuf Shafeeu
- Screenplay by: Yoosuf Shafeeu
- Produced by: Niuma Mohamed
- Starring: Yoosuf Shafeeu; Ali Seezan; Mohamed Manik; Aminath Rishfa; Washiya Mohamed; Aishath Lahfa
- Cinematography: Ibrahim Moosa
- Edited by: Yoosuf Shafeeu; Mohamed Abdul Ganee
- Music by: Fathuhullah Shakeel
- Production company: Newxo Production
- Release date: 7 October 2023
- Country: Maldives
- Language: Dhivehi

Kalhaki is a 2023 Maldivian horror film written and directed by Yoosuf Shafeeu. Produced by Niuma Mohamed under Newxo Productions, the film stars Yoosuf Shafeeu, Ali Seezan, Mohamed Manik, Aminath Rishfa, Washiya Mohamed and Aishath Lahfa in pivotal roles. The film follows a group of friends on a holiday abroad, and how their trip becomes a horrifying nightmare as bizarre events unfold. The film was released on 7 October 2023.

== Premise ==
The film follows a group of friends embarking on a holiday getaway in an unfamiliar foreign locale, seeking to craft cherished memories. However, this destination and trip turns into a nightmare when some bizarre and unexplainable events start to unravel, instilling terror and horror in the group.

== Cast ==
- Yoosuf Shafeeu as Sharif
- Ali Seezan as Nimal
- Mohamed Manik as Zalif
- Aminath Rishfa as Mashidha
- Washiya Mohamed as Ziyana
- Aishath Lahfa as Lamha

== Development ==
In October 2017, the project with a working title Kalhaki was announced. After two years with no updates from the production company, in October 2019, actress Niuma Mohamed re-announced the film as the producer of the film, with a different cast including Yoosuf Shafeeu, Ali Seezan, Aminath Rishfa, Mohamed Mani, and Mohamed Faisal. The film marks the second production from the studio NewXo Films, following the release of the psychological thriller film Nivairoalhi (2019). In January 2020, the cast and crew of the film departed to Sri Lanka for filming. Filming for the whole project was completed in Sri Lanka within twenty days.

== Release ==
Kalhaki was theatrically released on 7 October 2023. The film received mixed to positive reviews from critics. Aminath Luba reviewing from The Press lauded Washiya Mohamed's performance in portraying the possessed character, commending her ability to stand on par with the senior actors. Apart from her reservations about the climax and the editing, she was impressed with Shafeeu's direction and the acting performances of the entire cast.

== Accolades ==
Award	Category	Recipient(s) and nominee(s)	Result	Ref(s)
1st MSPA Film Awards	Best Lead Actor – Male	Ali Seezan	Nominated	
1st MSPA Film Awards	Best Supporting Actor – Male	Yoosuf Shafeeu	Won	
1st MSPA Film Awards	Best Supporting Actor – Male	Mohamed Manik	Nominated	
1st MSPA Film Awards	Best Supporting Actor – Female	Aminath Rishfa	Nominated	
