= Beeveema =

2023 Maldivian film

- Official film poster
- Directed by: Ahmed Zareer
- Written by: Ahmed Zareer
- Produced by: Mohamed Ali; Aishath Fuad Thaufeeq
- Starring: Mariyam Ashfa; Ismail Rasheed; Aminath Rashfa; Adam Zidhan
- Cinematography: Ibrahim Wisan
- Edited by: Ahmed Zareer
- Music by: Munaz Zubair
- Production company: Dark Rain Entertainment
- Release date: 6 February 2023
- Running time: 140 minutes
- Country: Maldives
- Language: Dhivehi

Beeveema is a 2023 Maldivian film written and directed by Ahmed Zareer. Produced by Mohamed Ali and Aishath Fuad Thaufeeq under Dark Rain Entertainment, the film stars Mariyam Ashfa, Ismail Rasheed, Aminath Rashfa and Adam Zidhan in pivotal roles. The film was released in theatres on 6 February 2023.

== Plot ==
The film revolves around two lovers, Ayaz and Raniya. The film starts with Ayaz going to a classroom. He is a part-time lecturer at Maldives National University. He works for the Ministry of Education and is given a task to check the infrastructure of Keyodhoo school due to the increase in the number of students. Ayaz goes to Keyodhoo, which is his home island, and reconnects with his old classmate Raqeeb. They both go for a coffee and plan a get-together. During the get-together, Faisal tells everyone about Raniya. Ayaz gets flashbacks of his relationship with Raniya. Raniya comes to the party and meets Ayaz after 20 years. She finds out that Ayaz is still unmarried.

After the get-together, Raniya repeatedly asks Ayaz why he didn't get married. Ayaz tells Raniya that he got a proposal from one of his coworkers, Shahu, but he rejected it as he was still in love with Raniya. Raniya gives Ayaz her diary in which she wrote everything about Ayaz and their relationship. Raniya ask Ayaz why he didn't return to her. Ayaz tells her that he did go to meet her but she refused to meet him. In reality Raaniya saw her stalker instead of Ayaz and refused to meet the stalker. Ayaz tells Raniya he knew everything about her until her marriage. He was present at Raniya's wedding but didn't have the courage to stop it. Ayaz and Raniya go out for a walk and stay at Ayaz's apartment due to bad weather.

The next day, Raniya asks Ayaz to get married and start a life. Afterwards Ayaz drops Raniya at the airport and she leaves for Malaysia. After Raniya's departure, Ayaz reads Raniya's diary. The film ends with the young Raniya going out to meet Ayaz after being told that he has come to meet her.

== Cast ==
- Ismail Rasheed as Ayaz
  - Adam Zidhan as young Ayaz
- Mariyam Ashfa as Raniya
  - Aminath Rashfa as young Raniya
- Aishath Yaadha as Nasma
  - Huneysha Adam as young Nasma
- Ahmed Sunie as Raqeeb
  - Aman Ali as young Raqeeb
- Ali Shazleem as Faisal
  - Hoodh Ibrahim as young Faisal
- Aminath Noora as Faathun
- Aminath Shuha as Aroosha
- Adam Rizwee as Fahudh
- Aishath Gulfa as Ainth
- Saila as Aimina
- Azmee Adam Naseer as Muhaimin
- Naala Ahmed Zareer as Alya
- Abdulla Mahir
- Hassan Irufaan
- Aisha Ali
- Aminath Silna
- Mariyam Waheedha
- Rizwana Haleem
- Mohamed Shivaaz
- Ibrahim Shiyaz
- Abdulla Hussain
- Mohamed Raee
- Ibrahim Ziyau Mohamed
- Hamdhoon Farooq
- Ali Nadheeh
- Aminath Shamra
- Aminath Shaana Saeed
- Fathimath Zuhair
- Mohamed Waheed
- Mohamed Sameer
- Aminath Eysha Jaufar
- Aishath Mishya
- Mohamed Naail
- Abdulla Rifaah
- Maadhih Imthiyaz
- Adam Zidhaan
- Abdulla Noor
- Hussain Alsan Mohamed
- Abu Saeed

== Development ==
The project was announced in August 2020 as the first feature film direction by screenwriter Ahmed Zareer. On 7 September 2020 it was revealed that playback singer Mariyam Ashfa will make her film debut in Beeveema and will play the lead role of the film alongside Ismail Rasheed. In February 2021, producer Mohamed Ali announced that the film will introduce seven newcomers in prominent roles of the film.

First schedule of filming took place in between the lockdowns imposed due to COVID-19 pandemic. Producer Mohamed Ali shared that restrictions imposed due to COVID-19 pandemic affected the production as it became mandatory to follow the safety and health guidelines at all times of shoot. Second schedule of filming commenced in December 2021 at V. Keyodhoo. Filming was completed in January 2022.

Post-production of the film was handled by Ali Shifau. A rough edit of the film of length over three hours was completed in February 2022. As insisted by director Zareer, trimming of the film had cut its runtime by around forty-five minutes. Dubbing for the film commenced in March 2022.

== Soundtrack ==
Track listing
No.	Title	Lyrics	Music	Singer(s)	Length
1.	"Beeveema"	Ahmed Zareer	Munaz Zubair	Shalabee Ibrahim, Mariyam Ashfa	5:02
2.	"Sirru"	Shammoon Mohamed	Abdulla Zifan Zahir	Shammoon Mohamed, Mira Mohamed Majid	3:49
3.	"Hadhiyaa"	Nasma Abdul Muhsin	Ali Zahil, Shahyd Legacy, Abdullah Jasir	Nasma Abdul Muhsin, Ahmed Fazaal Hussain	4:30
4.	"Hiyy Adhu Ronee Ey"	Hussain Shihab	Hussein Thaufeeq	Mariyam Ashfa, Shalabee Ibrahim	4:06
5.	"Gellifaa"	Shammoon Mohamed	Hussein Thaufeeq	Mira Mohamed Majid

== Release and response ==
The film was released theatrically on 6 February 2023. It marks as the first film screened at Olympus Cinema after modernizing the infrastructure and its re-opening on 4 February 2023.

Upon release, the film received mainly positive reviews from critics. Aminath Luba from The Press praised the acting performance of the lead actors and she applauded Ismail Rasheed for his consistently good performance, Aminath Rashfa for establishing herself as a confident performer and the two newcomers (Mariyam Ashfa and Adam Zaidhan) for delivering an impactful performance in their debut appearance. Calling the film a "better adaptation of the inspiration", Luba particularly praised the work of cameraman Ibrahim Wisan for trying to immerse the audience in the 1990s.

Ahmed Hameed Adam from Minoos singled out the performance of Ashfa as the most pleasant surprise of the film: "Ashfa in her element was different, talented and extremely natural. It does not even feel like it is her debut performance". Furthermore, Adam opined that the relevancy of the film with its backstory plugs the right emotion of the audience. Similar sentiments were echoed by Inayath Ali from Kulhudhuffushi Online. Apart from praising the lead actors, Ali wrote: "As much as Ashfa surprises us with her performance, Zareer's debut role as a director is also praiseworthy. The film is different than the usual DRE's projects and hopefully a new beginning of a positive change".

However, Ahmed Nadheem from Dhauru criticized the filmmakers for calling the film an "inspiration" of Tamil film '96 (2018) while it is a "frame-to-frame copy of the same": "The truth is that there is no film titled Beeveema, rather a copied product, wasting the time, skills, money and resources". After its publication, Dark Rain Entertainment released a public statement, condemning the author and Dhauru news website for its "lack of research and professionalism". The team further stated that they have not "intended not tried to conceal the truth from public"; it is an inspiration of the Tamil film which itself is based on other films including Alex Lehmann's Blue Jay (2016).

== Accolades ==
Award	Category	Recipient(s) and nominee(s)	Result	Ref(s)
1st MSPA Film Awards	Best Lead Actor – Male	Ismail Rasheed	Nominated	
1st MSPA Film Awards	Best Debut – Female	Mariyam Ashfa	Won	
1st MSPA Film Awards	Best Playback Singer – Female	Mariyam Ashfa for "Hiy Adhu Ronee"	Nominated	
1st MSPA Film Awards	Best Playback Singer – Female	Mira Mohamed Majid for "Gellifa"	Nominated	
1st MSPA Film Awards	Best Lyrics	Shammoon Mohamed for "Sirru"	Nominated	
1st MSPA Film Awards	Best Story	Ahmed Zareer	Nominated	
