= Gudhan =

Maldivian web series

- Written by: Mohamed Munthasir
- Screenplay by: Mahdi Ahmed
- Directed by: Ibrahim Wisan
- Music by: Shahyd Legacy
- Country of origin: Maldives
- Original language: Divehi
- No. of seasons: 1
- No. of episodes: 12

Production
- Cinematography: Mohamed Sami
- Editors: Maiha Adam; Naim
- Production company: Orkeyz Inc

Original release
- Release: August 21 – November 13, 2022

Gudhan is a Maldivian web series directed by Ibrahim Wisan. It stars Mohamed Afrah, Mohamed Shivaz, Dimitri Vergé, Azmee Adam Naseer, Mohamed Najah, Fathimath Visama, and Ali Inaz in main roles. The pilot episode of the series was released on 21 August 2022.

The series follows the lives of seven strangers who hide inside a go-down in the neighborhood to flee an unknown police raid at a massage parlor. With police zeroing in, tension, mistrust, and emotions run high inside the go-down as everyone turns against each other, and their past and present come peeling off layer by layer.

== Cast and characters ==
=== Main ===
- Mohamed Afrah as Naseem
- Mohamed Shivaz as Izzuddin Solih
- Dimitri Vergé as Jean Pierre
- Azmee Adam Naseer as Hassan Firaz
- Mohamed Najah as Wahid
- Fathimath Visama as Nazneen
- Ali Inaz as Shuhurab Sodhiq

=== Recurring ===
- Maiha Adam as Dhanaa; Solih's wife
- Ansham Mohamed as Aisthu
- Ravee Farooq as Aisth's friend
- Shimal Hameed as Adeeb
- Dheena Ahmed as Zarana
- Delwar Hossen as Ali Almir
- Ahmed Sharif as Hossen
- Rex as Faathun

=== Guest ===
- Mariyam Haleem as Zarana's mom (Episode 1)
- Rushani Lewke Bandara as Lakshmi (Episode 1)
- Mariyam Shima as Sithu (Episode 6)
- Ahmed Alam as Yoosuf (Episode 11)
- Aisha Ali as Abidha (Episode 11)
- Aakil as child Solih (Episode 11)
- Hamdhan Farooq as Imran (Episode 12)
- Ahmed Jillian Rashad as Ihusan Saeed (Episode 12)

== Episodes ==
No.	Title	Directed by	Original release date
1	"00:07"	Ibrahim Wisan	August 21, 2022
Averting a police raid, Naseem seeks shelter from a nearby go-down and explores his new surroundings whilst trying to maintain his calm. His wife, Zarana, working at a law firm invites her subordinate, Adeeb, to her home since she is home alone that night. The more Naseem digs in, the more it unfolds into the unexpected.
2	"00:34"	Ibrahim Wisan	August 28, 2022
Introductions and further explorations happen collectively. Being uninformed on top of misinformation keeps everyone at an edge. Meanwhile, the police search tightens, as they head towards the go-down.
3	"01:15"	Ibrahim Wisan	September 4, 2022
When male nurse Pierre starts screaming, he is tied to a chair until they figure the situation out. Police start searching houses in the cordoned area, further distressing the group. Sodhig faints and the group refuses to seek help from outside.
4	"01:40"	Ibrahim Wisan	September 11, 2022
Pierre attended to Sodhig. A vote is taken among the members to call a cafe' located in the same road as the parlor, to gain more insight on the raid. The caller informs of several arrests within the parlor and premises near the parlor.
5	"02:03"	Ibrahim Wisan	September 18, 2022
Sodhig bonds with the masseuse Naaz and declares that he is ready to marry her even if she has a seven years old child diagnosed with down syndrome whose father is unknown to her too. Pierre helps Wahid to overcome the side effect of Viagra.
6	"02:33"	Ibrahim Wisan	September 25, 2022
Solih finds a wallet with a business card of a police officer inside it and searches everyone to check if there is a mole amongst them. A caller to Solih referred him as "Choppat" which triggers Naseem; Choppat being the reason behind his ex-girlfriend, Sithu's suicide for leaking her nudes.
7	"03:11"	Ibrahim Wisan	October 2, 2022
The group hears a voice from a box and they open it to find an expatriate, Ali Almir hiding from Police. Almeer shares his experience from where he first came to Maldives in 2019 looking for a job and how he was forced into sex slavery by his boss, Hossen.
8	"03:29"	Ibrahim Wisan	October 9, 2022
Grabbing the right opportunity, Almir flees from his boss and goes to Male'. The police briefly search the go-down from a vent. The group nearly escapes from the police search. In the flashback it is seen that Firaz visited the parlor in search of an Ihusan Saeed.
9	"03:53"	Ibrahim Wisan	October 16, 2022
In a flashback Naaz and Sodhiq's first encounter was revealed where Naaz is smitten by Sodhiq's innocence and shyness. Naaz gives a befitting reply to a sexist comment from Solih.
10	"04:25"	Ibrahim Wisan	October 23, 2022
Almir receives a call from the assistant of his boss and the group allows him to take the call, but keeping it on speaker, which reveals that Almir exchanges sexual offers with the assistant, Imran, for the sake of shelter. Firaz admits that he is a drug dealer and took the shortcut since he fails to land a job after multiple interviews and attempts.
11	"04:47"	Ibrahim Wisan	October 30, 2022
Solih revisits his childhood trauma, where his mother, Abidha leaves them in greed of money. Solih's father orders his son never to "empower" a woman as he begins his own family. Enraged by his actions, Naseem tries to stab Solih but hesitates on the sound of Adhan.
12	"05:23"	Ibrahim Wisan	November 13, 2022
In a flashback it is revealed that the demise of Wahid's wife leads to the separation of his family and ultimately, his daughters, Aisthu and Faathun, desperately seeking solace in drugs. Realizing the outcome of their actions, Wahid's daughters call him asking for his forgiveness and sharing their intention to join a rehab together. Sodhiq proposes to Naaz and commits to accept her son as his own. Solih admits his mistakes and asks forgiveness from everyone.

== Soundtrack ==
Track listing
No.	Title	Music	Singer(s)	Length
1.	"Dhaaru Ofu Maiy"	Shahyd Legacy	Mohamed Muazzin Naeem

== Release and reception ==
The first episode of the series was released on 21 August 2022 through Baiskoafu. Upon release, the series received positive response from critics. Ahmed Rasheed reviewing its fourth episode praised the screenplay and concept of the series for its "surprisingly good" deviation from the usual local contents.
