= Dheydharu Ruin =

2024 Maldivian film

- Official film poster
- Directed by: Ali Azzam
- Written by: Ali Azzam
- Screenplay by: Ali Azzam
- Produced by: Ilyas Waheed; Asim Ali
- Starring: Sharaf Abdulla; Maiha Adam; Hazif Mohamed; Moosa Rasheed; Sushma Subedi
- Cinematography: Ismail Yanim
- Edited by: Adam Shinadh
- Music by: Fachu
- Production companies: Kazmik International; IFilms
- Release date: 20 November 2024
- Running time: 77 minutes
- Country: Maldives
- Language: Dhivehi

Dheydharu Ruin is a 2024 Maldivian action crime drama film written and directed by Ali Azzam. Co-produced by Ilyas Waheed and Asim Ali under Kazmik International and IFilms, the film stars Sharaf Abdulla, Maiha Adam, Hazif Mohamed, Moosa Rasheed and Sushma Subedi in pivotal roles. It follows the story of human trafficking and marks the first Maldivian film to address this issue. It was released on 20 November 2024.

== Premise ==
Sharaf, a young man burdened by the shadows of his traumatic past and a life of abuse at the hands of his father, finds solace only in the support of his empathetic therapist, Nashwa. One restless night, overwhelmed by his memories and struggling to breathe, he steps outside seeking relief. In the quiet streets, he encounters Rakshya, a desperate woman on the run from shadowy pursuers. Her plea for help thrusts him into danger, as two gang members ambush Sharaf.

Despite his inner turmoil, he fights them off and shelters Rakshya in his home, turning to Nashwa for guidance on how to navigate the escalating chaos. Unbeknownst to Sharaf, the gang is relentless in their pursuit, tracking him down and offering a sinister deal to avoid further bloodshed. What follows is an intense, action-packed thriller as Sharaf is forced to confront his fears and summon hidden strength to protect himself and Rakshya.

== Cast ==
- Sharaf Abdulla
- Maiha Adam as Nashwa
- Hazif Mohamed
- Moosa Rasheed as Ramelan
- Sushma Subedi as Rakshya
- Moosa Aleef as Azim
- Ibrahim Fairooz as father
- Aishath Gulfa as mother
- Mohamed Eehan Inayath
- Munaz Mahir
- Adhuham Layaal Qasim

== Development ==
Kazmik International announced their first feature film, titled Dheydharu Ruin, in August 2024. It marks the first Maldivian film focusing on human trafficking. Sharaf Abdulla was announced as the lead actor of the film, marking his second role as an action hero after the film Fureytha (2024). Additional cast members include Maiha Adam, Hazif Mohamed, Moosa Rasheed and a Nepalese actor Sushma Subedi.

== Release and reception ==
The release date of the film was announced as 20 November 2024. On 10 November 2023, the National Centre for the Arts requested to postpone the release date of the film to organize a music show from 18 to 20 November 2024. However, after further negotiations with the relevant authorities, IFilms and Kazmik International announced that film would release on the originally planned date.

The film received mixed reviews from critics. Mariyam Waheedha from Sauvees praised the performance of actors, particularly of Hazif's and commended the climax of the film. Aminath Luba from The Press echoed similar sentiments, highlighting the action-packed performances of Sharaf and Hazif while commending the cinematography and other actors' contributions. Afrah from Oivaru appreciated the beginning of the film but noted that the pacing slowed down in parts.
