= Sirru (web series) =

Maldivian web series

- Screenplay by: Mohamed Aboobakuru
- Story by: Samaah Ibrahim
- Directed by: Mohamed Aboobakuru
- Music by: Ayyuman Shareef
- Country of origin: Maldives
- Original language: Divehi
- No. of seasons: 1
- No. of episodes: 5

Production
- Cinematography: Samaah Ibrahim
- Editor: Mohamed Shifuan
- Production company: Me Production

Original release
- Release: October 21 – November 18, 2021

Sirru is a Maldivian romantic drama web series directed by Mohamed Aboobakuru. Produced by ME Productions, it stars Ahmed Asim, Hawwa Shadhiya, Aminath Shuha and Ahmed Shareef in main roles. Filming for the five episodes' series commenced in June 2021. The pilot episode of the series was released on 21 October 2021.

== Cast and characters ==
- Ahmed Asim as Amir
- Hawwa Shadhiya as Reema
- Aminath Shuha as Asma
- Ahmed Emau as Nadheem
- Ahmed Shareef

== Episodes ==
No. in season	Title	Directed by	Original release date
1	"Episode 1"	Mohamed Aboobakuru	October 21, 2021
Amir (Ahmed Asim) working and managing a supply company, is looking to expand their business into further resorts. He is married to a modern woman, Reema (Hawwa Shadhiya) who seems to be having an affair behind her husband.
2	"Episode 2"	Mohamed Aboobakuru	October 28, 2021
Reema is revealed to be having an affair with Nadheem, the husband of her best friend, Asma (Aminath Shuha)
3	"Episode 3"	Mohamed Aboobakuru	November 4, 2021
The two couples spend a day together. In one of such events, Amir catches Reema a little closer with Nadheem and is suspicious of their relationship. Amir suggests Reema to start a family which she rebuffs as she is not ready. Amir finds Nadheem's lost watch behind their bed, which Reema cleverly covers up.
4	"Episode 4"	Mohamed Aboobakuru	November 11, 2021
The following day, he catches Nadheem leaving their apartment which further elevates his suspicions. Unable to convince Asma of her husband's affair with her best friend, Amir brings Asma to their apartment to confront Asma which leads to the ultimate fall in their friendship. Reema later changes the narrative to imply that she was blackmailed by Nadheem, which Asma denies to believe.
5	"Episode 5"	Mohamed Aboobakuru	November 18, 2021
Asma finds the private pictures of Reema and they believe her version of the narration until the truth was exposed as Reema the person who was blackmailing Nadheem in order to get close with him. However, the delayed truth leads to an unexpected outcome in all of their relationship.

== Soundtrack ==
Track listing
No.	Title	Lyrics	Music	Singer(s)	Length
1.	"Himeynkan"	Equatic Vibe	Equatic Vibe	Shammu

== Release and reception ==
The first episode of the series was released on 21 October 2021. Reviewing the first two episodes of the series, Ahmed Rasheed from MuniAvas was generally in favor of the screenplay and wrote: "The series narrates a common and relatable storyline from a different perspective". The series was ranked fifth position at Baiskoafu Original Chart revealed on 3 December 2021.
