= Maiha Adam =

Maldivian film actress

Fathimath Maiha Adam Zahir
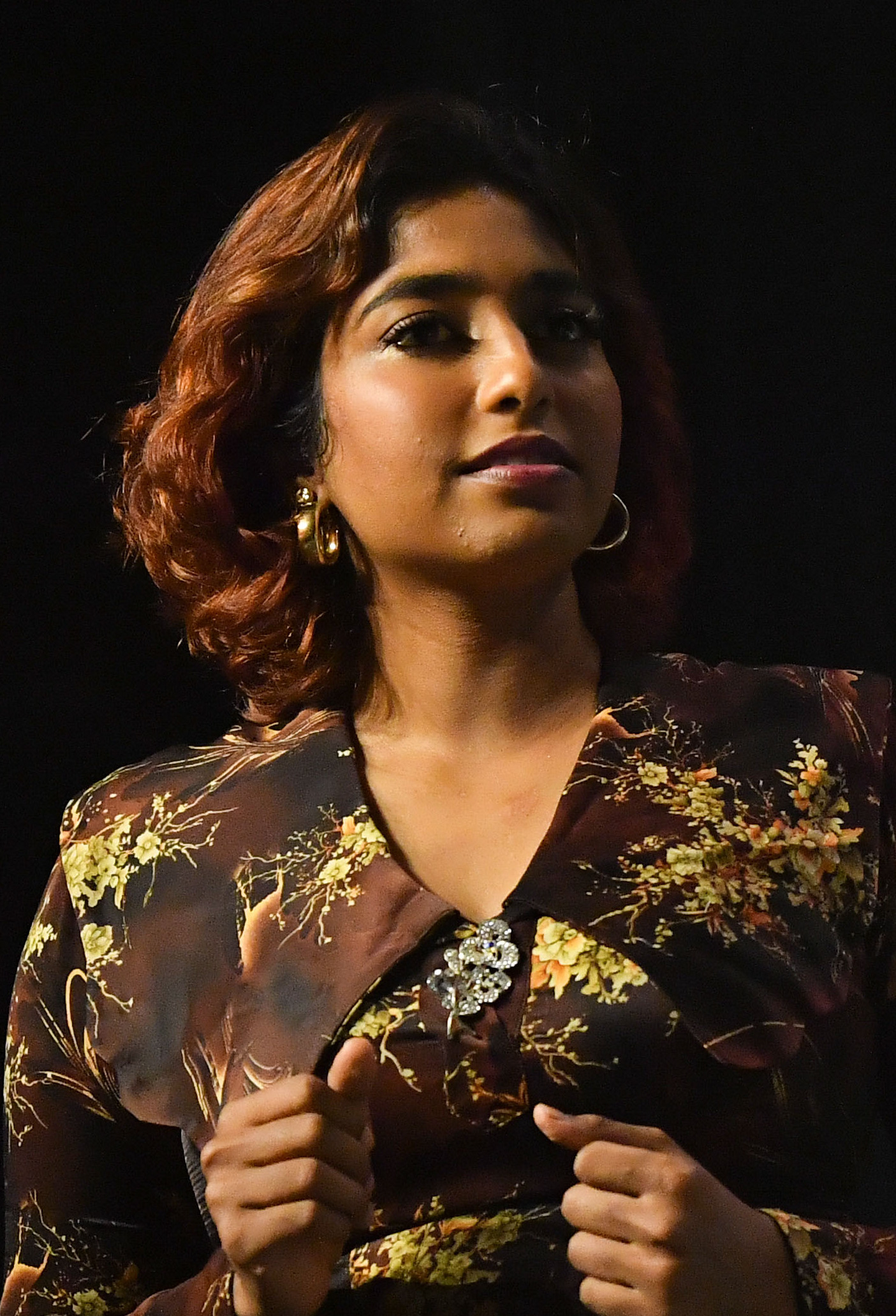
- Maiha in 2023
- Born: 8 September 1993 (age 32); Malé
- Occupations: Actress; host
- Years active: 2021–present

Fathimath Maiha Adam Zahir (born 8 September 1993), commonly known as Myeha Adam is a Maldivian film actress and television host. She made her film debut in 2021 with Ibrahim Wisan's web series Girlfriends, playing a film crew technician entangled in a complicated relationship with a married man. She collaborated again with Wisan the following year in the web series Gudhan.

In 2023, Adam appeared in Aishath Rishmy's romantic web series Yaaraa , followed by Naaisha Nashid's anthology series Badhalu. She later starred in Ali Azzam's action crime drama Dheydharu Ruin (2024), the first Maldivian film to address the issue of human trafficking. While the film received mixed reviews, Adam’s performance was singled out for praise, with critics describing her as an aspiring actress who demonstrated strong potential.

== Career ==
In 2021, Adam made her film debut as one of the three roommates in Ibrahim Wisan's Girlfriends (2021). In the series, she played the role Shamla, a film crew technician who is in a complicated relationship with a married man. The following year she collaborated again with Ibrahim Wisan for his web series Gudhan, where she played the wife of a man hiding in a go-down with strangers to escape a police raid on a massage parlor. Ahmed Rasheed reviewing from MuniAvas praised the screenplay and concept of the series for its "surprisingly good" deviation from the usual local contents.

In 2023, she appeared in Aishath Rishmy's romantic web series Yaaraa, where she played a colleague of the main character in a narrative about the contrasting lives of two sisters facing the realities of relationships. She next appeared alongside Ahmed Sharif in Naaisha Nashid-directed anthology web series Badhalu in the second segment titled "The Usual". This segment follows a couple heading for divorce, despite their love and affection for the memories they hold together.

She then collaborated with Ali Azzam for the action crime drama film Dheydharu Ruin (2024), addresses the issue of human trafficking—a first for Maldivian cinema. While the film received mixed reviews, Adam's performance praised. Mariyam Waheedha from Sauvees called her "an aspiring actor who has proven her potential in this film".

== Filmography ==
Key
†	Denotes films that have not yet been released

=== Feature film ===
Year	Title	Role	Notes	Ref(s)
2024	Dheydharu Ruin	Nashwa		
2025	Alifaan	Maree		

=== Television ===
Year	Title	Role	Notes	Ref(s)
2021–2024	Girlfriends	Shamla Shareef	Main role; 24 episodes	
2021	Noontha?	Shiu	Guest role in the segment "Bits & Pieces"	
2022	Gudhan	Dhanaa	Recurring role; 6 episodes Also the co-editor	
2023–2024	Yaaraa	Hudha Didi	Recurring role; 16 episodes	
2023	Badhalu	Mariyam Lara Muhaimin	Main role; Episode: "The Usual"	

=== Other work ===
Year	Title	Editor	Notes	Ref(s)
2005	Gudhan	Yes	Web series; 12 episodes	
