= Gellunu Rey =

2024 Maldivian film

- Official film poster
- Directed by: Hassan Haleem
- Written by: Aishath Rishtha
- Screenplay by: Aishath Rishtha
- Produced by: Andhala Haleem
- Starring: Mohamed Manik; Aminath Shuha; Kausar
- Cinematography: Hassan Haleem
- Edited by: Ahmed Asim
- Music by: Hardy
- Production company: Coco Studio
- Release date: 29 October 2024
- Running time: 174 minutes
- Country: Maldives
- Language: Dhivehi

Gellunu Rey is a 2024 Maldivian horror film directed by Hassan Haleem. Produced by Andhala Haleem under Coco Studio, the film features Mohamed Manik, Aminath Shuha, Ibrahim Jihad, Mariyam Shifa and Kausar in pivotal roles. The film was released on 29 October 2024. The film follows an arrogant woman who mistreats her husband and explores the impact this has on everyone involved.

== Cast ==
- Mohamed Manik as Nadheem
- Aminath Shuha as Zaa
- Ibrahim Jihad as Nihaan
- Mariyam Shifa as Samira
- Mariyam Haleem as Fareedha
- Kausar

== Development ==
Gellunu Rey was announced in September 2024, marking the first feature film direction by the acclaimed cinematographer, Hassan Haleem. The film was produced by Haleem's daughter, Andhala Haleem, an aspiring vocalist in the Maldivian film industry. Filming took place in R. Maakurathu.

The screenplay, written by Aishath Rishtha, is based on a plotline provided by Haleem. The lead cast includes Mohamed Manik, Aminath Shuha, Ibrahim Jihad and Mariyam Shifa, with child actor Kausar taking on a significant role in the narrative.

== Soundtrack ==
Track listing
| No. | Title | Singer(s) | Length |
|---|---|---|---|
| 1. | "Gellunu Rey" | Aishath Inaya, Rilwan |

== Release and response ==
The film was theatrically released on 29 October 2024. Upon release, the film received mixed reviews from critics and performed moderately at the box office.
