= Aminath Shuha =

Maldivian film actress and former TV presenter

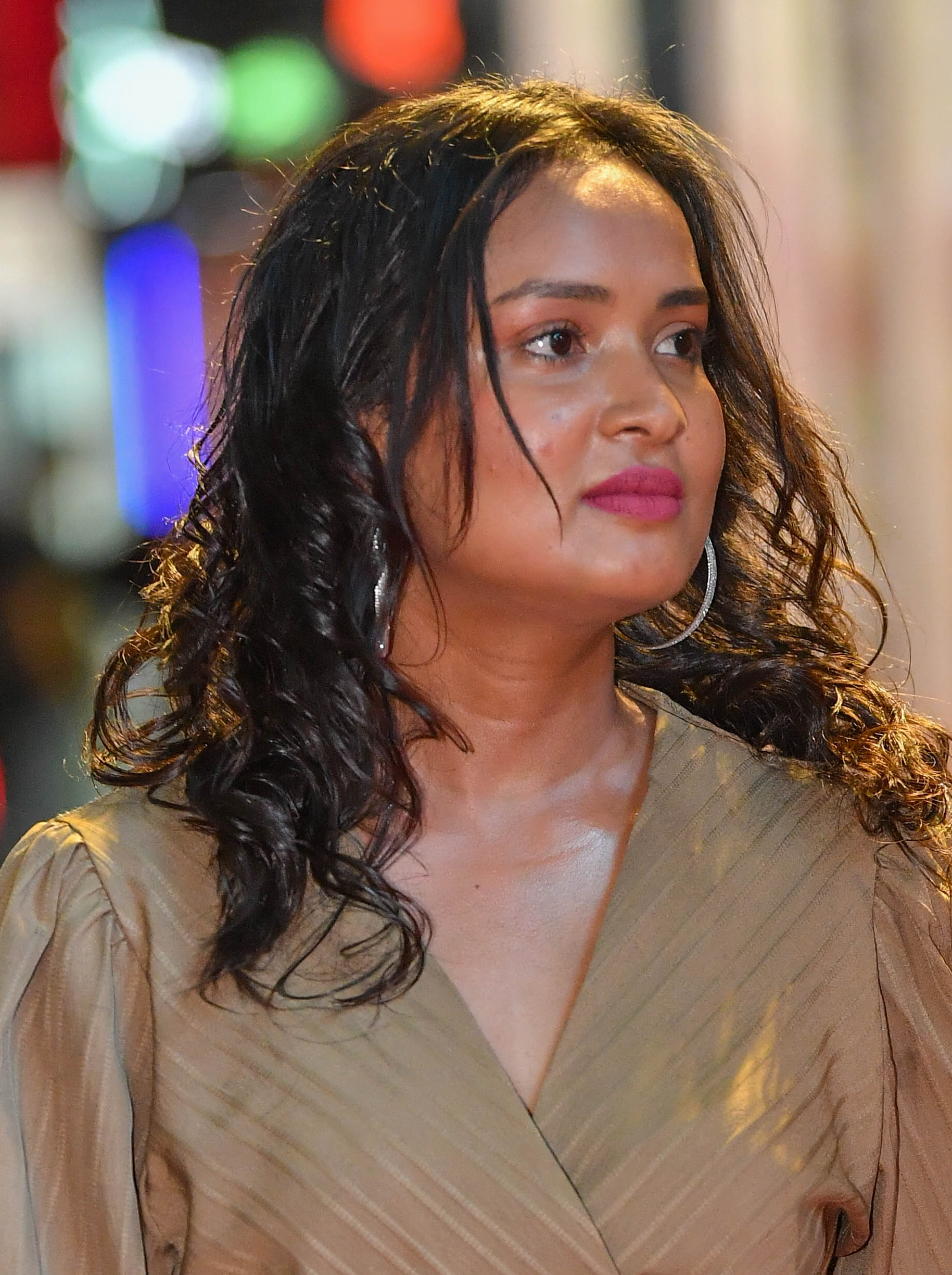
- Shuha attending Olympus reopening ceremony, 2023
- Born: 7 May 1997 (age 29); Malé, Maldives
- Occupations: Actress, TV Host
- Years active: 2017–present
- Spouse: Ahmed Nilsham (m. 2019)

Aminath Suha Musthafa (born 7 May 1997), commonly known as Aminath Shuha is a Maldivian film actress and former TV presenter.

== Career ==
Prior to acting, Shuha worked as a show presenter and host in several television programs from Ice TV. For her presentation in of the shows Loabin (2017), she was attracted to negative reception from the audience, due to her flirtatious behavior which she attributed as "required as per the concept of the show".

She made her film debut with the second season of Ravee Farooq-directed web series Ehenas (2020) where she played the role of Zoya, a supportive figure to a bullied and sexually abused male victim. Ifraz Ali from Dho? reviewing the second season of the series noted her character to be "futile" and "holds no value" in terms of narration. She next starred in Mohamed Aboobakuru-directed family drama Sirru (2021) which received mixed reviews from critics, where Ahmed Rasheed from MuniAvas was generally in favor of the screenplay and wrote of the initial episodes and wrote: "The series narrates a common and relatable storyline from a different perspective", while other critics found it to be "too cliché" and lacks "emotion".

In 2022, Shuha collaborated with Ilyas Waheed for a brief role in the last chapter titled "Hintha" from the four-part anthology web series Mazloom which was considered a "benchmark project" in the industry. She then played the role of Mauna in the office comedy sitcom Office Loabi developed by Amyna Mohamed. The series along with her performance received positive reviews from critics, where Mariyam Waheedha from Dhen called her role to be "distinct" from the cast. She next collaborated with Mohamed Aboobakuru for Ali Shazleem-directed family drama Rimsha where she played the role of Mariyam, an underprivileged island girl who moves to Male' City and wrecks a happy marriage for the sake of wealth and money. Afterwards, she worked with Yoosuf Shafeeu for the first chapter of the thriller web series E Series. Titled Baby, Shuha played the role of Zeyba, a woman who is accused by her husband to be involved in an extramarital affair. Upon release, the three episode limited series met with positive reviews from critics, where Saajid Abdulla from MuniAvas particularly praised the performance of the lead actors.

== Filmography ==
=== Feature film ===
Year	Title	Role	Notes	Ref(s)
2023	Beeveema	Aroosha		
2023	November	Huma		
2024	Lasviyas	Anee		
2024	Udhabaani 2	Lathafa		
2024	Bibii	Ameera		
2024	Gellunu Rey	Zaa		
2025	Alifaan	Reesha		
2026	Jannath			

=== Television ===
Year	Title	Role	Notes	Ref(s)
2020	Ehenas	Zoya	Main role; 12 episodes	
2021	Nafsu	Jaisha	Recurring role; 10 episodes	
2021	Sirru	Asma	Main role; 5 episodes	
2021	Noontha?	Raina	Guest role in the segment "Rules & Regulations"	
2022	Mazloom	Shaan's friend	Guest role in "Chapter 4: Hintha"	
2022	Office Loabi	Mauna	Main role; 10 episode	
2022	Rimsha	Mariyam	Main role; 13 episodes	
2022	Baby	Zeyba	Main role; 3 episodes	
2023	Badhalu	Mariyam	Main role; Episode: "Engaged"	
2023	Hama Emme Meehekey	Sama	Recurring role; 6 episodes	
2024	Dark Rain Chronicles	Saaya	Main role in the segment "Dejavu"	
2024	Yaaraa	Roxy	Guest role; "Episode 28 & 50"	
2024–2025	Roaleemay	Zara	Main role; 15 episodes	
2025	Feshumaai Nimun	Nuha Rasheed	Main role; 10 episodes	
2025	Moosun	Rasha	Main role; 7 episodes	
2025	Ganaa	Azu	Main role	
2026	Beynun	Shara	Main role	

=== Short film ===
Year	Title	Role	Notes
2024	Eid Mubarak	Herself	
