= Badhalu =

Maldivian web series

- Directed by: Naaisha Nashid
- Country of origin: Maldives
- Original language: Divehi
- No. of seasons: 1
- No. of episodes: 5

Production
- Executive producers: Mohamed Mirusan; Abdulla Hafiz
- Cinematography: Mohamed Aiman; Ismail Moosa
- Editors: Rafhan Shareef; Naaisha Nashid
- Running time: 10-20 minutes

Original release
- Release: April 5, 2023 – November 12, 2024

Badhalu is a Maldivian anthology web series consisting three short segments directed by Naaisha Nashid. The first chapter titled Friends stars Washiya Mohamed and Aisha Ali as two best friends who figures out their true colors, the second segment titled The Usual features Ahmed Sharif and Maiha Adam as a couple heading for divorce while the last segment features Maleeha Waheed as a soon to be wife trapped in a difficult situation.

The fourth segment titled Memories was released in 2024 which narrates the story of an adopted child looking after his mother suffering from amnesia. This was followed by the segment which shows the dynamic bond of two individuals going through a breakup.

== Cast ==
=== Friends ===
- Washiya Mohamed as Reema
- Aisha Ali as Zai
- Ahmed Sharif as Haisham

=== The Usual ===
- Ahmed Sharif as Shamin Ali
- Maiha Adam as Mariyam Lara Muhaimin

=== Engaged ===
- Maleeha Waheed as Reena
- Aminath Shuha as Mariyam
- Fathimath Visama as Mariyam's friend

=== Memories ===
- Sheela Najeeb as mother
- Ahmed Maseeh as Noor

=== The End of Us ===
- Sharaf Abdulla as Shifan
- Aishath Raisha as Raushan
- Mariyam Nisha as mother

== Chapters ==
No.	Title	Directed by	Original release date
1	"Friends"	Naaisha Nashid	April 5, 2023
Reema and Zai, longtime friends and roommates, are in the process of relocating to a new apartment after three years together. While packing, they engage in a candid discussion about the deceitful behavior of some of their other friends. Reema's phone runs out of battery, prompting her to borrow Zai's phone to make a call. This call inadvertently exposes a devastating secret: Zai has been having an affair with Reema's boyfriend, Haisham, behind her back.
2	"The Usual"	Naaisha Nashid	April 14, 2023
Lara and Shamin set off on their planned farewell journey, a culmination of three months of preparation. They visit their favorite breakfast spot, indulging in their customary morning meal. This final rendezvous allows them to reflect on their shared history, from their initial meeting to their school days. Ultimately, they enter the courtroom to formalize their divorce, acknowledging that while circumstances change, the memories remain eternally unchanged.
3	"Engaged"	Naaisha Nashid	April 21, 2023
While preparing for her upcoming wedding, Reena manages to complete her dress fitting and settle on the design for the wedding cards. However, she can't shake the feeling of being neglected by her fiancé, Arham, throughout the process. When Reena asks Arham to meet that night for finalizing their wedding plans, he brushes her off, citing work commitments and a busy schedule. On her way home, Reena shares a cab with two other passengers who unintentionally expose a secret, causing Reena to come to a stark realization about Arham's disloyalty.
4	"Memories"	Naaisha Nashid	July 16, 2024
A compassionate young man returns to the city and lovingly prepares a meal for a middle-aged woman. As she eats, she recounts her life story—an infertile divorcee who found joy in adopting a boy named Noor, orphaned by tragedy after his mother's death and his father's imprisonment. She describes Noor as her greatest blessing and the center of her world. In a poignant twist, the man is revealed to be Noor, caring for his ailing mother, now battling memory loss, with unwavering devotion.
5	"The End of Us"	Naaisha Nashid	November 12, 2024
Shifan ends his relationship after discovering his girlfriend's betrayal with his best friend. While searching for a new place to live, he meets Raushan, who is renting out her house following her divorce. Sharing similar struggles, the two connect over coffee, hinting at the start of a potential new chapter in their lives.

== Release and reception ==
The first chapter of the series titled "Friends" was released on 5 April 2023 through Baiskoafu. This segment explores the bond between two friends, Reema and Zai, who heavily rely on each other but are left heartbroken when the shocking affair between Zai and Reema's boyfriend is revealed. The subsequent segment, featuring Ahmed Sharif and Maiha Adam, was released on April 14, 2023. It portrays the lives of two childhood friends who become a couple and the tough decisions they make to separate for each other's well-being. The final segment tells the story of Reena, who discovers her fiancé's affair in a challenging situation. All three segments have received positive reviews from critics, with particular praise for the sharp-edged premise and the outstanding acting skills of the lead cast.
