= Loaiybahtakaa (TV series) =

Maldivian television series

- Written by: Binma Ibrahim Waheed
- Screenplay by: Binma Ibrahim Waheed
- Directed by: Mohamed Shiyaz
- Starring: Ibrahim Jihad; Nashidha Mohamed; Sheela Najeeb; Mariyam Shakeela
- Country of origin: Maldives
- Original language: Divehi
- No. of seasons: 1
- No. of episodes: 6

Production
- Cinematography: Ali Ajlaan Mohamed
- Running time: 23-35 minutes

Original release
- Release: March 3 – April 7, 2025

Loaiybahtakaa is a Maldivian television series written by Binma Ibrahim Waheed directed by Mohamed Shiyaz. It stars Ibrahim Jihad and Nashidha Mohamed as a middle-class family living with their daughter, whose married life is cursed by their sister-in-law, played by Sheela Najeeb. Additional cast including Ahmed Asim, Ahmed Easa and Mariyam Shakeela plays supporting roles in the series.

It was announced as one of the television programs scheduled to be distributed by Television Maldives during Ramadan 1446. The first episode of the series was released on 3 March 2025.

== Premise ==
Rifa and Mamdhooh, siblings living in the same building, lead contrasting lives—Rifa craves luxury despite her modest life with Amru, while Mamdhooh’s wife, Zulfa, is manipulative and envious. Desperate for a son, Rifa takes a mysterious fertility medicine from Zulfa, only to spiral into aggression and psychotic episodes that destroy her marriage. Though Amru gives their relationship another chance after realizing Zulfa’s deception, Rifa’s disturbing behavior resurfaces, leading to their final and irreversible divorce. Heartbroken and lost, she is offered an unexpected deal by Mihad, Amru’s businessman friend—marry him if she wants a chance to reunite with Amru. Reluctantly, she agrees, leading to an unexpected turn in their lives.

== Cast and characters ==
=== Main ===
- Ibrahim Jihad as Amru
- Nashidha Mohamed as Rifa
- Ahmed Easa as Mihad; Amru's friend
- Sheela Najeeb as Zulfa
- Mariyam Shakeela as Rifa's mother
- Mariyam Theesha as Sara

=== Recurring ===
- Ahmed Asim as Mamdhooh
- Mariyam Nisha as Mihad's sister

=== Guest ===
- Mohamed Aman Alam
- Mohamed Musthafa; Mihad's friend (Episode 3)
- Mariyam Waheedha as Moomee (Episode 6)
- Manito Shrestha

== Episodes ==
No.	Title	Directed by	Original release date
1	"Episode 1"	Mohamed Shiyaz	March 3, 2025
Rifa and Mamdhooh, siblings living in the same building, lead contrasting lives. Rifa, married to Amru, longs for a lavish lifestyle despite their modest earnings. Meanwhile, Mamdhooh’s wife, Zulfa, is manipulative and envious of Rifa, even attempting to seduce Amru. Rifa’s mother suspects Zulfa played a role in Rifa’s past divorce from Amru. Desperate for a son, Rifa takes an unknown medicine given by Zulfa, claiming it aids fertility. Soon after, she begins experiencing terrifying nightmares.
2	"Episode 2"	Mohamed Shiyaz	March 10, 2025
Rifa finds herself trapped in a vicious cycle of aggression and memory lapses, leading to repeated conflicts with Amru. During one such heated exchange, she impulsively demands a divorce, and Amru, heartbroken, accepts. When confronted by her mother, Rifa breaks down and confesses that she had taken medicines from Zulfa, desperate for a baby boy. Realizing the manipulation, Amru gives their marriage another chance, and they undergo ruqyah to cleanse any evil influences. For a brief moment, happiness returns to their lives. However, their peace is short-lived as the same disturbing behavior resurfaces. Rifa spirals into aggressive and psychotic episodes, this time in public, embarrassing Amru and damaging their relationship beyond repair. Unable to cope any longer, Amru divorces her for the third and final time, leaving Rifa shattered and lost.
3	"Episode 3"	Mohamed Shiyaz	March 17, 2025
Mihad, a businessman and Amru's friend, offers Rifa a deal—to marry him, if she wants to reunite with Amru. Reluctantly, she agrees but demands gold worth MVR 2 lakh as mahr and a private wedding at a resort to keep it hidden from their friends. However, the wedding gets delayed for a week, forcing Rifa and Mihad to spend time together.
4	"Episode 4"	Mohamed Shiyaz	March 24, 2025
Rifa informs Amru that she must stay for a week, and he reluctantly agrees. Mihad takes her to a salon and buys her dresses, though she tries to keep her distance. Curious about his intentions, she asks if he will divorce her after the marriage, and he replies that he will—only if she insists. They eventually marry, and Mihad begins trying to win her love. Meanwhile, Zulfa attempts to manipulate Amru into believing that Rifa is still abusive and unstable.
5	"Episode 5"	Mohamed Shiyaz	March 31, 2025
Rifa grows more comfortable with Mihad and enjoys their time together at the resort. Moving into his apartment, she is captivated by the luxury surrounding her. Meanwhile, Amru is unsettled by Rifa’s transformation. As time passes, Rifa starts feeling that Mihad is forcing their marriage and interfering in her relationship with her daughter. Desperate, she begs him to let her go, but Mihad assures her that he has already filed for divorce—though he confesses that he still loves her.
6	"Episode 6"	Mohamed Shiyaz	April 7, 2025
Rifa gradually begins to develop feelings for Mihad, though she worries that her daughter, Sara, may not accept him. Hoping to convince her, Rifa brings Sara to their home, but Sara refuses to stay, convinced her mother has abandoned their simple life. Meanwhile, a heartbroken Amru, unable to cope with the changes, aimlessly roams the streets in the rain and meets with a tragic accident. His sudden death leaves Rifa overwhelmed with guilt, casting a shadow over her growing bond with Mihad.

== Development ==
Filming began in December 2024 where lead actress Nashidha Mohamed posted behind the scenes photos with co-stars including Mariyam Nisha. On 26 January 2025, Tonic Live Studio posted studio recording clips of Aminath Raya Ashraf recording the title song of the series. The project was officially announced on 10 February 2025 as one of the television programmes to be distributed by Television Maldives during Ramadan 1446.

== Soundtrack ==
Track listing
No.	Title	Lyrics	Music	Singer(s)	Length
1.	"Loaiybahtakaa"	Binma Ibrahim Waheed	Ibrahim Zaid Ali	Aminath Raya Ashraf

== Release and reception ==
The first episode of the series was released on 3 March 2025. Upon release, the series received mainly positive reviews from critics, with performances of lead actors and the child actor being particularly praised.
