= Mohamed Afrah (actor) =

Maldivian actor (born 1971)

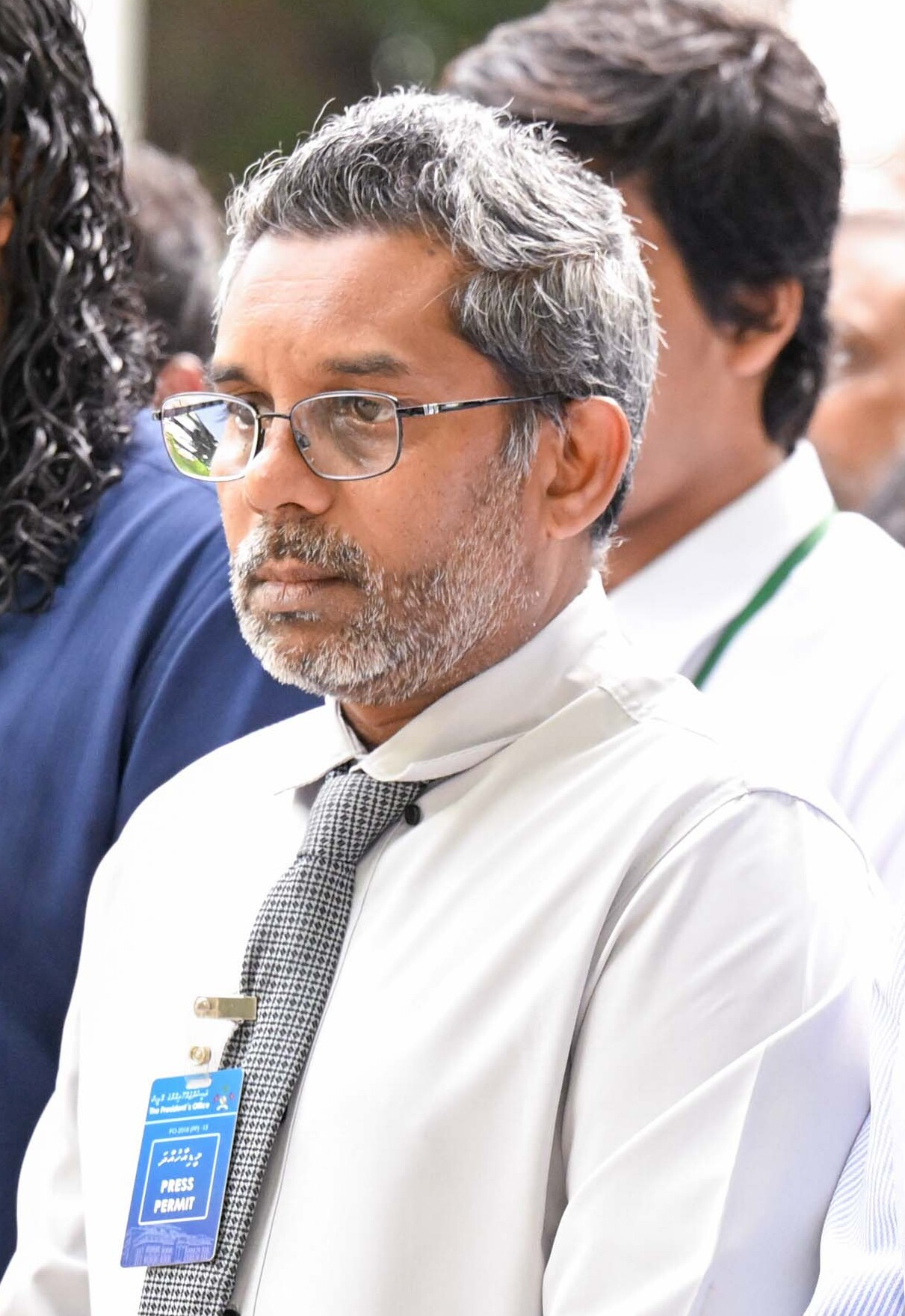
- Afrah in 2025
- Born: 15 November 1971 (age 54); B. Maalhos
- Occupations: Actor, journalist
- Years active: 2019–present

Mohamed Afrah (born 15 November 1971) is a Maldivian film actor and journalist.

== Early life ==
After completing his studies, he appeared in a stage drama directed by Kopee Rasheed. Following the performance, Abdul Muhusin from Television Maldives offered him roles in two video songs opposite Haajara Abdul Kareem. The songs, "Naanaavee Seedhaa Loabi" and "Dhin Mihitheh Anburaa", went on to become classics. He later appeared in a minor role in Abdulla Shujau’s film Nafrathu before making a comeback in the second season of Bithufangi.

== Career ==
In 2019, he made his film official career debut in Maldivian first sitcom Karu Hakuru developed by Mohamed Munthasir. His performance as the nosy neighbor and the series received positive reviews from critics. He next appeared in Ilyas Waheed's psychological thriller film Bavathi (2019), where he played the role of Zahir, a middle aged man who performs ruqyah on a disturbed couple. The film narrates the story of a woman who relocates to Male' after marriage and the strange incidents that follow afterwards. The film received positive reviews from critics, where Ifraz Ali from Dho? credited the film with a four star rating and applauded the screenplay for its "tight suspense" while Aminath Luba reviewing from Sun opined that Bavathi will go down the history lane as an "unexpected masterpiece".

Apart from appearing in a small role in Ibrahim Wisan's Girlfriends (2021) and Ilyas Waheed's four-part anthology web series Mazloom (2021), he collaborated with Yoosuf Shafeeu for his web series Giridha (2021). Developed as a hybrid of "sitcom and casual comedy", the series follows three friends who move to Male' in hopes of finding work and lures their lessor to fund for their dream film project.

In 2022, he had multiple releases. He first appeared in a supporting role as a father who abandoned his daughter in Ahmed Nimal directed web series Lafuzu. He then played the role of Mohamed Fikury, a carefree HR manager in the office comedy sitcom Office Loabi developed by Amyna Mohamed. The series along with his performance received positive reviews from critics, where Ahmed Rasheed from MuniAvas praised the performance of Afrah in particular, while highlighting the "excellent integration of a unique concept to the viewers".

He next starred in Bahaulla Ibrahim's family drama television series Shakuvaa alongside Ahmed Easa, Nathasha Jaleel and Nuzuhath Shuaib, playing the supportive friend of the lead actor. This was followed by Azhan Ibrahim's crime thriller web series Dharaka. The series revolves around a high-profile case of the disappearance of a politician's daughter. Reviewing the finale of the series, Ahmed Rasheed from MuniAvas considered the series to be an "excellent watch, if you are interested in good quality series". He was then featured in the first installment from the eight-chapter series titled E Series developed by Yoosuf Shafeeu. In the chapter titled Baby, he played the father of Zeyba, a young girl accused to be possessed by a Jinn.

== Filmography ==
=== Feature film ===
Year	Title	Role	Notes	Ref(s)
1994	Nafrathu	Teacher	Special appearance	
2019	Bavathi	Zahir		
2023	Hindhukolheh	Counsellor		
2024	Kanbalhi			
2025	Alifaan			
2026	Jannath			

=== Television ===
Year	Title	Role	Notes	Ref(s)
2019–2021	Karu Hakuru	Rah Kudey	Main role; 36 episodes	
2021–2024	Girlfriends	Arushadbe	Recurring role; 8 episodes	
2021	Giridha	Zumarrath	Recurring role; 6 episodes	
2021	Mazloom	Himself	Guest appearance in chapter 3: Minju	
2021–2022	Giritee Loabi	Sattaru's boss	Recurring role; 22 episodes	
2022–2023	Lafuzu	Jalaal	Recurring role; 2 episodes	
2022	Office Loabi	Mohamed Fikury	Main role; 10 episode	
2022	Shakuvaa	Siraj	Main role; 5 episodes	
2022	Dharaka	Sameer	Recurring role; 8 episodes	
2022	Biruveri Vaahaka	Rasheed	Main role; Episode: "Lakunu"	
2022	Baby	Jaufar	Recurring role; 3 episodes	
2022	Gudhan	Naseem	Main role; 12 episodes	
2022	Bahdhal	Naseem	Recurring role; 3 episodes	
2023	Mirai	Shaaya's uncle	Recurring role; 2 episodes	
2023	Hama Emme Meehekey	Shahid	Guest role; "Episode 9"	
2024	Yaaraa	Magistrate	Guest role; "Episode 50"	
2025	Hinthaa	Mohamed Saeed	Main role; 10 episodes	
2025	Feshumaai Nimun	Aiman's father	Recurring role; 3 episodes	
2025	Moosun	Aadhanu	Recurring role; 4 episodes	
