= Girlfriends (web series) =

Maldivian web series

- Created by: Mohamed Munthasir
- Screenplay by: Mahdi Ahmed
- Directed by: Ibrahim Wisan
- Music by: Shahyd Legacy
- Country of origin: Maldives
- Original language: Divehi
- No. of seasons: 2
- No. of episodes: 24

Production
- Producer: Medianet
- Cinematography: Mohamed Sami
- Editors: Ahmed Sajid; Ali Jazlaan (Season 2)

Original release
- Release: August 12, 2021 – March 4, 2024

Girlfriends is a Maldivian web series written and directed by Ibrahim Wisan. It stars Maiha Adam, Aishath Lahfa and Aisha Ali in main roles. The pilot episode of the series was released on 12 August 2021.

== Cast and characters ==
=== Main ===
- Maiha Adam as Shamla Shareef
- Aishath Lahfa as Hawwa Ibrahim (Season 1)
- Aisha Ali as Fathimath Zila Ali
- Ahmed Sharif as Firushan Adam

=== Recurring ===
- Ahmed Alam as Ayya
- Maria Teresa Pagano as Martina
- Ali Usam as Faya; a neurologist
- Azzam Maumoon as Shimaz Shareef "Sarippe"
- Mohamed Afrah as Arushadbe
- Nathasha Jaleel as Sara
- Ahmed Shakir as a director
- Ali Shazleem as agent
- Imad Ali as Sam
- Shimmy as Nana

=== Guest ===
- Suja Abdullah as a customer (Episode: "Message")
- Hamdhoon Farooq as a customer (Episode: "Money Talks")
- Mariyam Shakeela as Wafira (Episode: "Murderer")
- Hamdhan Farooq as Shiyam (Episode: "Virgin")
- Mahfooz as a musician (Episode: "Virgin")
- Ali Farooq as Taxi driver (Episode: "Crossroads")
- Sharaf Abdulla as Hassan (Episode: "Crossroads")
- Mariyam Waheedha as an actress (Episode: "Click Click Click")
- Iyan as a cameraman (Episode: "Click Click Click")
- Moosa Aleef as a contractor (Episode: "Click Click Click")
- Mohamed Vishal as Baka (Episode: "Click Click Click")
- Aminath Rasheedha as Faathanik (Episode: "Click Click Click")
- Mariyam Haleem as Sobira (Episode: "Click Click Click")
- Nadha as Office staff (Episode: "Nana")
- Yaniu as Office staff (Episode: "Nana")
- Ismail Falil as Office staff (Episode: "Nana")
- Rushani as Sam's mother (Episode: "Nana")
- Khadheeja Soh'wa as Dr. Anaya (Episode: "Support Pillars")
- Yaniu as Partey (Episode: "Support Pillars")

== Episodes ==
Season	Episodes	Originally released		
Season	Episodes	First released	Last released	Network
1	12	August 12, 2021	November 11, 2021	Medianet Multi Screen
2	12	December 17, 2023	March 4, 2024	Medianet Multi Screen

No. overall	No. in season	Title	Directed by	Original release date
1	1	"Message"	Ibrahim Wisan	August 12, 2021
Roommates, Zila and Shamla are left at crossroads when covid's negative financial burden hits them unexpectedly. Shamla struggles dealing with a recent assault and robbery.
2	2	"Shutter"	Ibrahim Wisan	August 19, 2021
Confined in a limited relationship, Shamla makes demands on her boyfriend, Ayya, a married man. Martina, a colleague of Zila is out to get every tall, dark, and handsome on to her list. Shamla and Zila discuss to bring a new roommate.
3	3	"Stained"	Ibrahim Wisan	August 26, 2021
Shamla starts experiencing another bad day of the months and prefers to have her own space, which Ayya doesn't seem to understand.
4	4	"Weeping Chef"	Ibrahim Wisan	September 2, 2021
A new roommate, Hawwa is interviewed and approved over her delicious devil chicken. Her mysterious eyes run deeper than the initial glance.
5	5	"Aunt"	Ibrahim Wisan	September 9, 2021
Zila is devastated on hearing the demise of her favorite aunt, who was hospitalized in India. Sarippe, a pervert and the brother of Shamla, drops by unannounced.
6	6	"Money Talks"	Ibrahim Wisan	September 15, 2021
Sarippe is given an ultimatum to leave the apartment by Firushan after a shocking discovery by Shamla. Zila seeks help from Sarippe to buy abortion drugs for Martina.
7	7	"Murderer"	Ibrahim Wisan	September 23, 2021
Shamla accuses Zila of being an accomplice to a killing, whiles Hawwa has to entertain the oddest request at an interview. Sharif meets an elderly customer who checks if he was observing her.
8	8	"Virgin"	Ibrahim Wisan	September 30, 2021
Hawwa expresses to her roommates what she went through in the job interview. Whiles Shamla gets furious with a recording artiste initially, only to dine in conclusion.
9	9	"Spy"	Ibrahim Wisan	October 21, 2021
Suspicion over Hawwa grows to the extent that Zila and Shamla are ready to enter into "espionage", whilst Zila's generosity becomes more apparent.
10	10	"Gone Too Soon"	Ibrahim Wisan	October 28, 2021
Zila is worried about not hearing from Arshadbe, who is admitted to the ER. Meanwhile, Shamla gets busy at the gym, unbeknownst that her every move is watched by an unknown person. Later, Zila confronts the saddest news from Martina.
11	11	"Parasite"	Ibrahim Wisan	November 4, 2021
Finally, Shamla meets the person she has been trying to avoid at any cost. Sadly, she is on her own with her tail between her legs. And she also gets a new name, parasite.
12	12	"Finale"	Ibrahim Wisan	November 11, 2021
Shamla finds herself standing at crossroads after the humiliation waved by Sara. Nevertheless, they try to pull each other up even more than before.

No. overall	No. in season	Title	Directed by	Original release date
13	1	"Click Click Click"	Ibrahim Wisan	December 17, 2023
14	2	"Not The SAM Person"	Ibrahim Wisan	December 24, 2023
15	3	"Secret Notes"	Ibrahim Wisan	December 31, 2023
16	4	"Missing"	Ibrahim Wisan	January 7, 2024
17	5	"Shirhaan"	Ibrahim Wisan	January 14, 2024
18	6	"Falling In & Out"	Ibrahim Wisan	January 21, 2024
Have their close friendship reached a tipping point? Is this a permanent rift or a fleeting moment? Despite the apparent stickiness, will they ultimately part ways? Will they revert to what once was? A myriad of questions lingers.
19	7	"Nana"	Ibrahim Wisan	January 29, 2024
Sarippe undertakes a covert infiltration of an unfamiliar office in disguise. Tension persist between Shamla and Zila, stirring mixed emotions. Unexpectedly, Shamla finds solace in unconditional love, gradually filling her emotional void.
20	8	"Coffee Mug"	Ibrahim Wisan	February 5, 2024
Nana's intrusion into thee lives of three adds another layer of complexity to an already bewildering scenario. Tension permeates the air, leaving uncertainty; will it subside with the girlfriends' reconciliation or intensify the situation further?
21	9	"Trigger"	Ibrahim Wisan	February 11, 2024
Zila and Shamla discover Hawwa's obituary, prompting reflection on their shared history. Zila accompanies Shamla to a psychiatry specialist, unaware of the unexpected journey ahead.
22	10	"Support Pillars"	Ibrahim Wisan	February 18, 2024
Shamla, eager to end things with Sam, faces the challenge of orchestrating her exit strategically. Meanwhile, Zila grapples with vivid memories from her past, intensifying the struggle she faces.
23	11	"Reports"	Ibrahim Wisan	February 25, 2024
As the episode unfolds, Zila grapples with sense of entrapment and unresolved issues, confronted by harsh realities of life. Despite attempts by her housemates to provide comfort, Zila discovers additional questionable materials, deepening her doubts.
24	12	"Help"	Ibrahim Wisan	March 4, 2024
Firushan faces a barrage of questions about peculiar feelings. Has Shamla committed to Sam? Zila contemplates a decisive choice, seeking closure.

== Soundtrack ==
Track listing
No.	Title	Lyrics	Music	Singer(s)	Length
1.	"Vidhuvaru"	Mohamed Munthasir	Shahyd Legacy	Bajikko

== Release and reception ==
The first season consisting of 12 episodes was premiered on 12 August 2021 through Medianet Multi Screen and opened to positive reviews from critics. The second season was premiered on 17 December 2023.
