= Mira Mohamed Majid =

Maldivian female singer

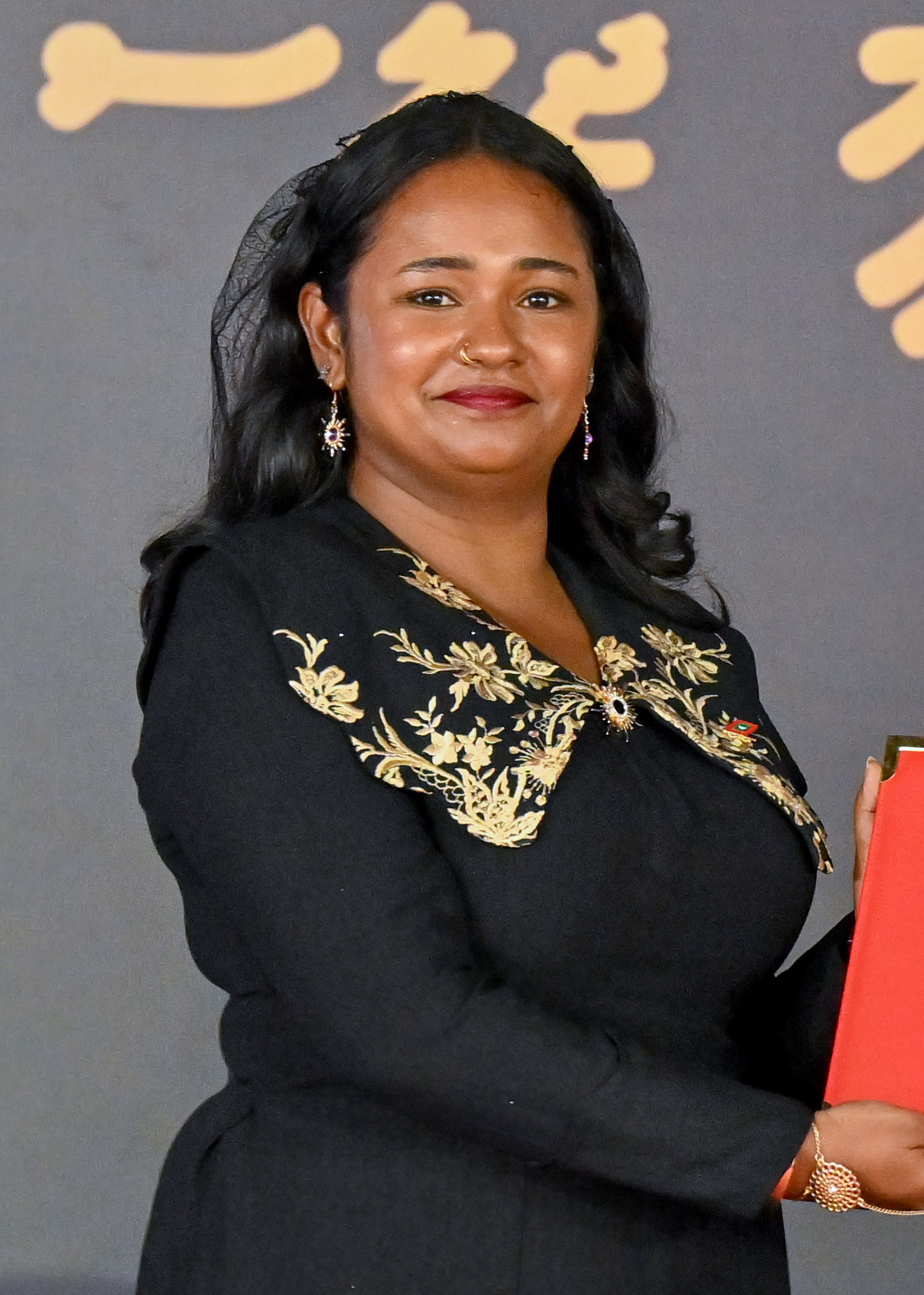
- Mira in 2025
- Born: 27 October 1993 (age 32); Male', Maldives
- Occupation: Playback singer
- Years active: 2019–present
- Musical career
- Genres: Pop; filmi; electronic
- Instrument: Vocals

Mira Mohamed Majid (27 October 1993) is a Maldivian singer.

== Early life and career ==
Majid was born on 27 October 1993. Her father, Mohamed Majid, a professional musician and a singer is a recipient of National Award of Recognition. In 1998, at the age of four, she took part in the inter-school singing competition and continued to participate frequently in subsequent years. Two years later, she performed few video singles for Television Maldives, which caught the public's attention. In 2000, she appeared as a performer in the Miss World pageant, which she considers the biggest show of her career. In 2006, her performance in the inter-school singing competition earned her second place overall. Her first public performance came in 2007, when she performed alongside her father at the Dhiraagu Speed Show, before making her professional debut with the song "Adhu Mi Haalaathu" from Ehan'dhaanugai Duet (2009) alongside Ahmed Ibrahim.

In 2015, Majid collaborated with the Indian music band, "Sanam" to perform the song "Yeh Vaadha Raha", a cover of Bollywood classic song "Tu Tu Hai Wahi". She released her first single, "Loaibakee", from her self-composed and self-written trilogy, on New Year’s Eve 2016. This was followed by “Vaudhu Vamey,” and concluded with “Neii Dhuvahakun".

At the 3rd Maldives Film Awards, Majid received the Best Female Playback Singer award for "Mijehey Vaigaa" from Love Story. For her rendition of the song "Gandhee Huvaa" in Ahsham, she was nominated for the Best Female Playback Singer at the 8th Gaumee Film Awards. At the 1st MSPA Film Awards she received two nominations for the songs "Gaathil" from Goh Raalhu and "Gellifa" from Beeveema.

== Discography ==
=== Feature film ===
Year	Film	Song	Co-artist(s)
2010	Fanaa	"Dhoapatta"	
2012	Love Story	"Mijehey Vaigaa"	Shammoon Mohamed
2015	Ahsham	"Gandhee Huvaa"	Ahmed Ibrahim
2016	Vaashey Mashaa Ekee	"Yaaraa Hinithun Veemaa"	Yaamin Rasheed
2019	Nivairoalhi	"Reydhanve Mendhanve Dhandhen"	Falih Adam
2019	Nivairoalhi	"Sihuru Fadhavi Kamana"	Hussain Sobah
2019	Goh Raalhu	"Gaathil"	Soppe
2019	Maamui	"Rey Rey"	Toy
2023	Beeveema	"Sirru"	Shammoon Mohamed
2023	Beeveema	"Gellifaa"	Solo

=== Non-Film songs ===
Year	Album/single	Song	Lyricist(s)	Co-Artist(s)
2009	Ehan'dhaanugai Duet	"Adhu Mi Haalaathu"		Ahmed Ibrahim
2010	Ehan'dhaanugai Remix	"Malekey Ehfadha"		Shammoon Mohamed
2012	Tharinge Rey 2012	"Aniya"		Mohamed Naffan Amir
2013	Tharinge Rey 2013	"Elhi Mi Kandu Mathi"		Soppe
2014	Vaahan'dhaanakun 3	"Reethi Nala Nala"		Solo
2014	Vaahan'dhaanakun 3	"Vaahan'dhaanakun Rovenee" (Group Version)	Mohamed Amir Ahmed	Various
2015	Ran Han'dhaanugai: S01	"Neyngey Gothehvey"	Abdulla Muaz Yoosuf	Mohamed Abdul Ghanee
2015	Enme Reethi: S01	"Neyngi Hithey Gendheveema Loabin"	Easa Shareef	Shalabee Ibrahim
2015	Sanam Covers	"Yeh Vaada Raha"	Gulshan Bawra	Sanam Puri
2016	Single	"Laoibakee"	Mira Mohamed Majid	Solo
2016	Single	"Vaudhu Vamey"		Solo
2016	Ehandhaanugai Covers	"Umurah Thiya Namugai"		Yaamin Rasheed
2016	Single	"Neii Dhuvahakun"		Solo
2017	Celebrating 20	"Ruhenyaa Loabi Dhee"		Abdulla Falih Adam
2017	Single	"Kiyaa Dhevuneemaa"		Abdulla Falih Adam
2017	Single	"Thin Lafzun"		Abdulla Falih Adam
2017	PBJam Couch Sessions: S01	"Roalhi"		Solo
2017	Rhythm: S01	"Insaanaa"		Abdulla Falih Adam
2017	Rhythm: S01	"Roanveehey"		Abdulla Falih Adam
2017	Rhythm: S01	"Aadhey Miadhu"		Abdulla Falih Adam
2018	Single	"Ishaaraiy Hey Kuree"	Ahmed Haleem	Abdulla Falih Adam
2018	Single	"Beynun Vanee"		Shalabee Ibrahim
2018	Ran Han'dhaanugai: S03	"Vaaloabi Engeynama"	Mohamed Abdul Ghanee	Abdulla Falih Adam
2018	Ran Han'dhaanugai: S03	"Udun Tharithah"		Solo
2019	Ehenas	"Dho Khiyaalee"	Mezzo Mohamed Majid	Solo
2019	Ehenas	"Loabi Vaathee"	Moosa Samau, Hussain Shifan	Moosa Samau
2020	Lockdown Covers	"Akiri Dhemey"	Mohamed Majid	Solo

== Filmography ==
Year	Title	Role	Notes	Ref(s)
2019	Ehenas	Herself	Special appearance as a wedding performer	

== Accolades ==
Year	Award	Category	Nominated work	Result	Ref(s)
2014	3rd Maldives Film Awards	Best Female Playback Singer	"Mijehey Vaigaa" - Love Story	Won	
2017	8th Gaumee Film Awards	Best Female Playback Singer	"Gandhee Huvaa" - Ahsham	Nominated	
2025	1st MSPA Film Awards	Best Playback Singer – Female	"Gaathil" – Goh Raalhu	Nominated	
2025	1st MSPA Film Awards	Best Playback Singer – Female	"Gellifa" – Beeveema	Nominated	
