= Yasna (web series) =

Maldivian web series

- Written by: Aminath Rinaza
- Screenplay by: Aminath Rinaza
- Directed by: Aminath Rinaza; Ali Rasheed
- Country of origin: Maldives
- Original language: Divehi
- No. of seasons: 1
- No. of episodes: 15

Production
- Producer: Ali Rasheed
- Cinematography: Ali Rasheed
- Editor: Ali Rasheed
- Production company: Blue Wave Entertainment

Original release
- Release: August 12 – November 18, 2022

Yasna is a Maldivian family drama web series directed by Aminath Rinaza and Ali Rasheed. It stars Ali Azim, Aishath Lahfa, Ali Shameel and Mariyam Haleem in main roles. The pilot episode of the series was released on 12 August 2022. The fifteen episodes' series narrates the story of two past lovers whose reunion is challenged by other commitments.

== Cast and characters ==
=== Main ===
- Ali Azim as Fauzaan
- Aishath Lahfa as Yasna
- Ali Shameel as Shareef
- Mariyam Haleem as Shameena
- Fathimath Latheefa as Waheedha
- Aminath Shaana as Anaa
- Ali Yooshau as Anil

=== Recurring ===
- Aishath Shifana as Nadha; Anaa's friend
- Fathimath Fainaa as Mufeedha; Waheedha's friend

=== Guest ===
- Moosa Ishaan as Shaan (Episode 2)
- Hawwa Shadhiya as Shaany; Fauzaan's friend (Episode 4)

== Episodes ==
| No. | Title | Directed by | Original release date |
|---|---|---|---|
| 1 | "Episode 1" | Aminath Rinaza, Ali Rasheed | August 12, 2022 |
Waheedha (Fathimath Latheefa), living with her carefree daughter, Anaa (Aminath Shaana) and her niece, Yasna (Aishath Lahfa), forces the latter out of her house. Shareef, a middle-aged family friend, takes her to his house and introduces her to his mother, Shameena (Mariyam Haleem) as her caretaker. Anaa is coerced into smoking due to peer pressure, while Yasna helps Shameena in carrying out household chores.
| 2 | "Episode 2" | Aminath Rinaza, Ali Rasheed | August 19, 2022 |
Fauzaan (Ali Azim), the only son of Shareef, visits Male' for a study break and is instantly attracted to Yasna who seems to have recognized her from his past. Fauzaan attempts to be friendly with Yasna but she refuses the temptation. Yasna feels uncomfortable around Fauzaan. Yasna reminds Shameena of her only daughter, Shaama who died due to domestic abuse.
| 3 | "Episode 3" | Aminath Rinaza, Ali Rasheed | August 26, 2022 |
Despite Waheedha's scolding, Anaa quits her job and continues to live her carefree life. Waheedha requests Yasna for financial support but the latter is helpless. Yasna in anxious about Faizaan and his constant affection towards her. Ultimately, Fauzaan confronts Yasna about his feelings and their past together during college days. Yasna admits leaving Fauzaan over a misunderstanding of him having an affair with a friend though she opines it is too late for a reunion.
| 4 | "Episode 4" | Aminath Rinaza, Ali Rasheed | September 2, 2022 |
Shareef shared the past of Yasna and how she has grown in midst of sufferings and loneliness. Waheedha starts spreading rumors of Yasna having an affair with Shareef and left Waheedha in greed of money. Shameena reiterates Yasna to accept them as part of her family and never to concede any secrets from her. Waheedha's friend called Yasna a "gold-digger" in public though Shameena defended her wholeheartedly.
| 5 | "Episode 5" | Aminath Rinaza, Ali Rasheed | September 9, 2022 |
Anaa's friend, Nadha, breaks into Waheedha's room and steals jewelries from her closet. Fauzaan attempts to reconcile with Yasna but she refuses his offer.
| 6 | "Episode 6" | Aminath Rinaza, Ali Rasheed | September 16, 2022 |
Waheedha brags about Shareef's financial aid which disgusts Yasna. Anaa attempts to lure a businessman, Anil (who happens to be friends with Fauzaan) into her trap. Waheedha visits Yasna and is amused by how comforting and happy her life is.
| 7 | "Episode 7" | Aminath Rinaza, Ali Rasheed | September 23, 2022 |
Yasna feels uncomfortable around Shareef as he shares his intention to relive his romance and passion. As persuaded by his friend, Anil, Fauzaan keeps hitting on Yasna. Anaa hears the rumors about Yasna and verbally abuses her on every encounter. Fauzaan is distressed realizing Yasna might be romantically involved with another man.
| 8 | "Episode 8" | Aminath Rinaza, Ali Rasheed | September 30, 2022 |
True colors of Shareef unveils as he starts getting intimate with Yasna and revealing his intentions. Unbeknownst to Fauzaan, he is determined to win Yasna's love at any cost. His sympathy game partially succeeds as Yasna slowly starts showing affection towards Fauzaan. Mufeedha brings the news of Anaa being involved in drug abuse with a bunch of friends which Waheedha rebuffs as baseless rumor.
| 9 | "Episode 9" | Aminath Rinaza, Ali Rasheed | October 7, 2022 |
Yasna falls sick and Shameena takes good care of her. Even though both Shameena and Fauzaan are ready to embrace her, Yasna hesitates to share her life challenges with them. Waheedha is confident that Nadha has been a bad influence on Anaa, though she is blinded by their friendship. Ultimately, Yasna reveals to Fauzaan that she is already married and she can never be with him ever again.
| 10 | "Episode 10" | Aminath Rinaza, Ali Rasheed | October 14, 2022 |
Fauzaan hints to Anil that Anaa is not the "wife material" which he is seeking from her, but that latter requires proof before taking any actions. Shareef requests Yasna to keep their marriage as a secret from public and his family, but she disapproves his plan.
| 11 | "Episode 11" | Aminath Rinaza, Ali Rasheed | October 21, 2022 |
Shameena eavesdrops Yasna's conversation with Shareef and is astonished to learn about their relationship. She finally confronts Yasna which Fauzaan hears, breaking his heart over the betrayal from his closed ones. Waheedha is shocked by the news of Anaa getting caught while using drugs.
| 12 | "Episode 12" | Aminath Rinaza, Ali Rasheed | October 28, 2022 |
Distressed over the treachery, Fauzaan chooses to avoid his family. He ultimately confronts his father and blames him for snatching his only chance for love and happiness. Shareef reveals that he married Yasna, sympathizing her for what she has gone through during her stay at Waheedha's place. Shareef requests Yasna to make a decision, while Yasna is guilty for breaking a happy family apart.
| 13 | "Episode 13" | Aminath Rinaza, Ali Rasheed | November 4, 2022 |
Shareef admits his ignorance for not consulting with his family, before taking such a huge decision in his life. Fauzaan refuses to accept his father's apology and cuts all ties with him which causes Shareef a stroke paralysis.
| 14 | "Episode 14" | Aminath Rinaza, Ali Rasheed | November 11, 2022 |
Guilty of her actions, Waheedha seeks forgiveness from Yasna. Meanwhile, Fauzaan starts blaming himself for putting Shareef into his current condition. The tragedy brings the whole family together.
| 15 | "Episode 15" | Aminath Rinaza, Ali Rasheed | November 18, 2022 |
Yasna vows to take good care of her husband while Fauzaan also promises to devote all his time for his father, delaying his studies until his father recovers. While imprisoned, Anaa dies from a drug overdose, shattering Waheedha's heart.

== Development ==
The project was announced on 7 July 2022, as the first web series produced by Blue Wave Entertainment. Producer and co-director Ali Rasheed reported that ninety percent of filming was completed by June and post production work was carried out simultaneously for the initial episodes. The lead actors of the series were announced to be Ali Azim and Aishath Lahfa, while actors Ali Shameel, Mariyam Haleem, Ali Yooshau, Fathimath Latheefa and Aminath Shaana were reported to appear in supporting roles. On 24 July 2022, Rasheed shared that the post production of the series is ongoing, while eighty percent of editing is already completed. He further announced that the series will be released with English subtitles.

== Soundtrack ==
Track listing
| No. | Title | Lyrics | Music | Singer(s) | Length |
|---|---|---|---|---|---|
| 1. | "Jazubaathu" | Rizny | Hussain | Mohamed Abdul Ghanee, Aminath Raya Ashraf | 5:41 |

== Release and reception ==
The first episode of the series was made available for streaming through digital streaming platform Medianet Multi Screen on 12 August 2022. Reviewing the first five episodes of the series, Ahmed Rasheed from MuniAvas generally favored the series and praised the tense built-up as the series progress. However, other critics found the screenplay to be slow and dragging while the actors tried to give their best in an otherwise over the top melodrama.
