= E Series (web series) =

Maldivian web series

- Poster of first segment Baby
- Screenplay by: Yoosuf Shafeeu
- Music by: Ayyuman Shareef
- Country of origin: Maldives
- Original language: Divehi
- No. of seasons: 1
- No. of episodes: 9

Production
- Producer: Fathimath Fareela
- Cinematography: Ahmed Zifaaf
- Editor: Yoosuf Shafeeu
- Production companies: 24 Entertainments; Eupe Productions; Shy Productions

Original release
- Release: July 9, 2022

E Series is a series of Maldivian anthology thriller web series produced by Fathimath Fareela under 24 Entertainments. The first chapter titled Baby written and directed by Yoosuf Shafeeu, stars Ibrahim Jihad, Aminath Shuha and Ibrahim Yaeesh in main roles. It follows a confused husband digging deeper into his wife's alleged affairs.

The second chapter titled Hissu, directed by Ismail Shafeeq, stars Ibrahim Jihad in lead role and narrates the challenges and struggles a husband goes through in search of his missing wife. The third segment titled Bahdhal, directed by Jihad follows the supernatural encounters faced by a womanizer (Ahmed Easa).

== Cast and characters ==
Baby

- Ibrahim Jihad as Rashid
- Aminath Shuha as Zeyba
- Ibrahim Yaeesh as Sameer
- Mohamed Faisal as Siraj; Sameer's brother
- Mohamed Afrah as Jaufar; Zeyba's father
- Ibrahim Muneez as Muneez
- Mariyam Sana as Zeeshan
- Ahmed Azmee as Azmee

Hissu

- Ibrahim Jihad as Zahir
- Rafiu Mohamed as Riyaz
- Fathimath Sujana as Shiuna
- Mohamed Rifshan as Ziyadh, Zahir's half-brother
- Mohamed as Modex

Bahdhal

- Ahmed Easa as Laamiu
- Fathimath Sujana as Faahira
- Shima as Sadhiya
- Zack as Hassan
- Mohamed Afrah as Zameer

== Chapters ==
No.	Title	Directed by	Written by	Camera by	Original release date
1	"Baby"	Yoosuf Shafeeu	Yoosuf Shafeeu	Ahmed Zifaaf	July 9, 2022
Rashid, a confused husband, accuses his wife Zeyba is having an affair with one of his subordinates, Sameer. Promising him shelter, Rashid takes Sameer to a vacant apartment and ties him to a chair for interrogation, which led Rashid to believe, Zeyba is talking to a third person. They go to Zeyba house only to find her possessed by a Jinn who attacks them. Few days later, Rashid pays a visit to Sameer's house where he is greeted by his brother Siraj. Suspecting Siraj is lying, he records Sameer and Siraj's conversation and discovers that all of it was a plan of the Siraj, who is the ex-boyfriend of Zeyba. Siraj's plan is successful but is warned by Rashid of the consequences.
2	"Hissu"	Ismail Shafeeq	Yoosuf Shafeeu	Shivaz Abdulla	August 10, 2022
Zahir, a caring husband, goes home to find his wife, Shiuna missing, who soon gets a call from a private number, notifying him that his wife is kidnapped and held hostage by him until the kidnapper gets half a million Rufiyaa as ransom within two days maximum. Zahir seeks help from his colleague Riyaz but refuses to involve Police. Zahir tries every possible way to get that amount of money, almost accusing Riyaz to be the kidnapper. In a turn of event, Zahir's half brother, Ziyad, meets Riyaz and informs that Zahir is diagnosed to be mentally unstable who has imaginary people in his life, including his wife, who was murdered by Zahir ten years ago. Ziyad specifically advises him not to help Zahir since there is already multiple victims fallen into his trap. Riyaz goes home only to discover his money missing and uncovering the truth in flashback of events.
3	"Bahdhal"	Ibrahim Jihad	Yoosuf Shafeeu	Ahmed Zifaaf, Shivaz Abdulla, Faisal	October 13, 2022
Laamiu, a womanizer has an affair with multiple women including a lustful woman, Faahira and a married woman, Sadhiya. One late night, Laamiu invites Sadhiya to meet him near the beach which brings a dynamic change in his life. The following night, he brings Faahira to his home but some scary events send her back. Meanwhile, Sadhiya visits him uninvited and they have sex all night long. However, suspicions grow as Sadhiya calls him and reveals the truth that she was unable to meet him the previous night. Agitated, he goes back to his room to find a disguised Sadhiya in a supernatural form.
4	"Phone Call"	TBA	Yoosuf Shafeeu	TBA	TBA
5	"Artist"	TBA	Yoosuf Shafeeu	TBA	TBA
6	"Servant"	TBA	Yoosuf Shafeeu	TBA	TBA
7	"Shadow"	TBA	Yoosuf Shafeeu	TBA	TBA
8	"Best Friend"	TBA	Yoosuf Shafeeu	TBA	TBA
9	"Bell"	TBA	Yoosuf Shafeeu	TBA	TBA

== Development ==
On 14 November 2021, it was revealed that first chapter of the series titled Baby will feature Ibrahim Jihad, Aminath Shuha and Ibrahim Yaeesh in the main role. The series marks the debut performance of Ibrahim Yaeesh, who was selected by director Yoosuf Shafeeu for the role after an audition. Filming for the third segment titled Bahdhal commenced in November 2021.

== Release and reception ==
The first chapter was made available for streaming through Baiskoafu on 9 July 2022 on the occasion of Eid al-Adha 1443. The three episode limited series met with positive reviews from critics, where Saajid Abdulla from MuniAvas particularly praised the performance of the leading actors including the newcomer, Ibrahim Yaeesh. The second chapter was made available for streaming through Baiskoafu on 10 August 2022. Upon release, the three episodes limited series met with positive reviews from critics, particularly praising the screenplay pace and performance of the lead actor. The first episode of the third chapter titled Bahdhal was released on 13 October 2022.
