= Hidhaaee Noor =

Studio album by Shalabee Ibrahim
- Released: June 30, 2016
- Recorded: Eleven Eleven Production
- Genre: Hymn
- Language: Dhivehi
- Producer: Shalabee Ibrahim

Hidhaaee Noor is a 2016 studio album performed by Shalabee Ibrahim. Lyrics for the album were written by Maumoon Abdul Gayoom, Adam Naseer Ibrahim, Hassan Shakir Mohamed, and Adam Abdul Rahman. The album was launched by Gayoom at an event held at Central Park, Malé, on 30 June 2016.

== Background and release ==
On 26 June 2016, it was revealed that Ibrahim will launch his first studio album. An album of hymns, it was promoted as one of the Ramazan gifts by Ibrahim. The album had a song penned by Maumoon Abdul Gayoom. Apart from Gayoom, Adam Naseer Ibrahim, Hassan Shakir Mohamed and Adam Abdul Rahman penned the lyrics for the rest of the album. Chorus part of the hymns were provided by some students from Iskandhar School and Ghiyasuddin International School. Mastering of the songs were completed by Hussain Sobah from Eleven Eleven studio.

The album was launched by Gayoom at an event held at Central Park, Malé, on 30 June 2016.

== Track listing ==
All music is composed by Shalabee Ibrahim

Hidhaaee Noor
No.	Title	Lyrics	Artist(s)	Length
1.	"Hidhaayathuge Dhanmaru"	Maumoon Abdul Gayoom	Shalabee Ibrahim	03:42
2.	"Alhuge Haalu"	Adam Naseer Ibrahim	Shalabee Ibrahim	05:18
3.	"Dhe Aalamah Mathiveri Nabiyya"	Hassan Shakir Mohamed	Shalabee Ibrahim	04:55
4.	"Zikuru Kurumuge Maaiykan"	Adam Naseer Ibrahim	Shalabee Ibrahim	04:07
5.	"Naseebuge Sirru"	Adam Naseer Ibrahim	Shalabee Ibrahim	03:48
6.	"Thiya Maaiy Loabeegai"	Adam Naseer Ibrahim	Shalabee Ibrahim	06:28
7.	"Hidhaaee Nooru"	Adam Abdul Rahman	Shalabee Ibrahim	03:06
Total length:				37:06
