= Office Loabi =

Maldivian web series

- Written by: Amyna Mohamed
- Screenplay by: Amyna Mohamed
- Directed by: Amyna Mohamed
- Music by: Paighde
- Country of origin: Maldives
- Original language: Divehi
- No. of seasons: 1
- No. of episodes: 10

Production
- Executive producers: Mohamed Mirusan; Abdulla Hafiz
- Cinematography: Ibrahim Moosa
- Editors: Rafhan Shareef; Mohamed Humam

Original release
- Release: April 2, 2022

Office Loabi is a Maldivian comedy web series written and directed by Amyna Mohamed. The series follows the life of colleagues, Rafhan Shareef, Ahmed Jillian Rashad, Ruby Fazal, Dheena Ahmed, Mohamed Shivaz, Mohamed Afrah, Aminath Shuha and Mariyam Waheedha. The series was announced in March 2022. The pilot episode of the first season was released on 2 April 2022 and was concluded on 14 June 2022. The series was renewed for a second season.

== Cast and characters ==
=== Main ===
- Rafhan Shareef as Rameez
- Ahmed Jillian Rashad as Jaisham
- Ruby Fazal as Raushan Ismail
- Dheena Ahmed as Muneera
- Mohamed Shivaz as Saeed
- Mohamed Afrah as Mohamed Fikury
- Aminath Shuha as Mauna
- Mariyam Waheedha as Shiflyn
- Ibrahim Salim Ismail as Hamdhaan

=== Recurring ===
- Ali Inaz as the cleaning boy

== Episodes ==
No.	Title	Directed by	Original release date
1	"New Girl"	Amyna Mohamed	April 2, 2022
An outgoing new recruit, Raushan Ismail, starts her first job at an egg distribution business company and is introduced to her judgmental and annoying colleagues.
2	"Company Name Change"	Amyna Mohamed	April 9, 2022
In an attempt to rebrand their company, HR Manager, Muneera opens a contest to suggest a name for their company, where the selected employee gets an exciting prize, which was ultimately cancelled much to the dismay of the employees.
3	"Boss is absent!"	Amyna Mohamed	April 16, 2022
Fikury takes a sick leave and accidentally announces it to the whole world, leading to cancellation of his much awaited trip to Dubai BissFare. As Muneera decides to take Saeed to the fare alongside her, Fikury overrules her decision to replace Saeed with Raushan.
4	"After The Office Trip"	Amyna Mohamed	April 22, 2022
After the Dubai trip, Muneera summons everyone for an urgent meeting. Muneera is upset with Fikree's performance and impressed with Raushan's creativity. Meanwhile, Rameez tries to flatter Muneera in a time where she finds Saeed to act too desperate lately.
5	"Employee of the Month"	Amyna Mohamed	April 29, 2022
Muneera scolds Mauna for her records of absenteeism and abusing office time with her personal business.
6	"Office Structure"	Amyna Mohamed	May 6, 2022
Staff complaints about their job description and level of hierarchy. Muneera requests Hamdhan to access Raushan's system and check her work progress. Hamdhan catches Shiflyn with the cleaning boy, MD Shuheil coming from the store room.
7	"Annual Bonus"	Amyna Mohamed	May 13, 2022
Shiflyn shares a photo of Abulho, Mauna's husband, with another woman, Sobira. Mauna passes the rage on Shiflyn. Junaid disappointed with the performance of the company decides that annual bonus will not be given to the staff. Saeed's first wife, Asma, pays a visit to Muneera and makes a deal with her.
8	"Office Training"	Amyna Mohamed	May 20, 2022
Muneera interviews the only shortlisted candidate for the post the graphic designer. Muneera meets the team and shares the annual plans for staff empowerment and several opportunities including staff training.
9	"Promotion (Part 1)"	Amyna Mohamed	May 27, 2022
Saeed gets promoted to a managerial position which creates conflict between him and Fikury. Meanwhile, Junaid offers Rameez a promotion but from another department which upsets Mauna.
10	"Promotion (Part 2)"	Amyna Mohamed	June 14, 2022
The colleagues host a party to celebrate Saeed's promotion and Rameez's birthday. Saeed's wife, Seema, makes a surprise visit to the party which results the two women, Seema and Muneera, quarrel over Saeed.

== Development ==
Filming for the series was completed in March 2022. It was announced that the film will debut several new faces to the industry from the nationally acclaimed Billiard player, Dheena Ahmed, model Ruby Fazal, dancer Rafhan Shareef and Ibrahim Salim Ismail, gym instructor Jillian Rasheed, along with some fresh actors, Ali Inaz, Aminath Shuha, Mohamed Shivaz, Mohamed Afrah and Mariyam Waheedha. A casting call was made on 11 July 2022 to audition new actors for the second season of the series.

== Release and reception ==
The first episode of the series was released on 2 April 2022 in Baiskoafu, on the occasion of Ramadan 1443. Reviewing the first episode of the series, Ahmed Rasheed from MuniAvas in particular praised the performance of Mariyam Waheedha and Mohamed Afrah while highlighting the "excellent integration of a unique concept to the viewers".
