= Mariyam Waheedha =

Maldivian actress (born 1984)

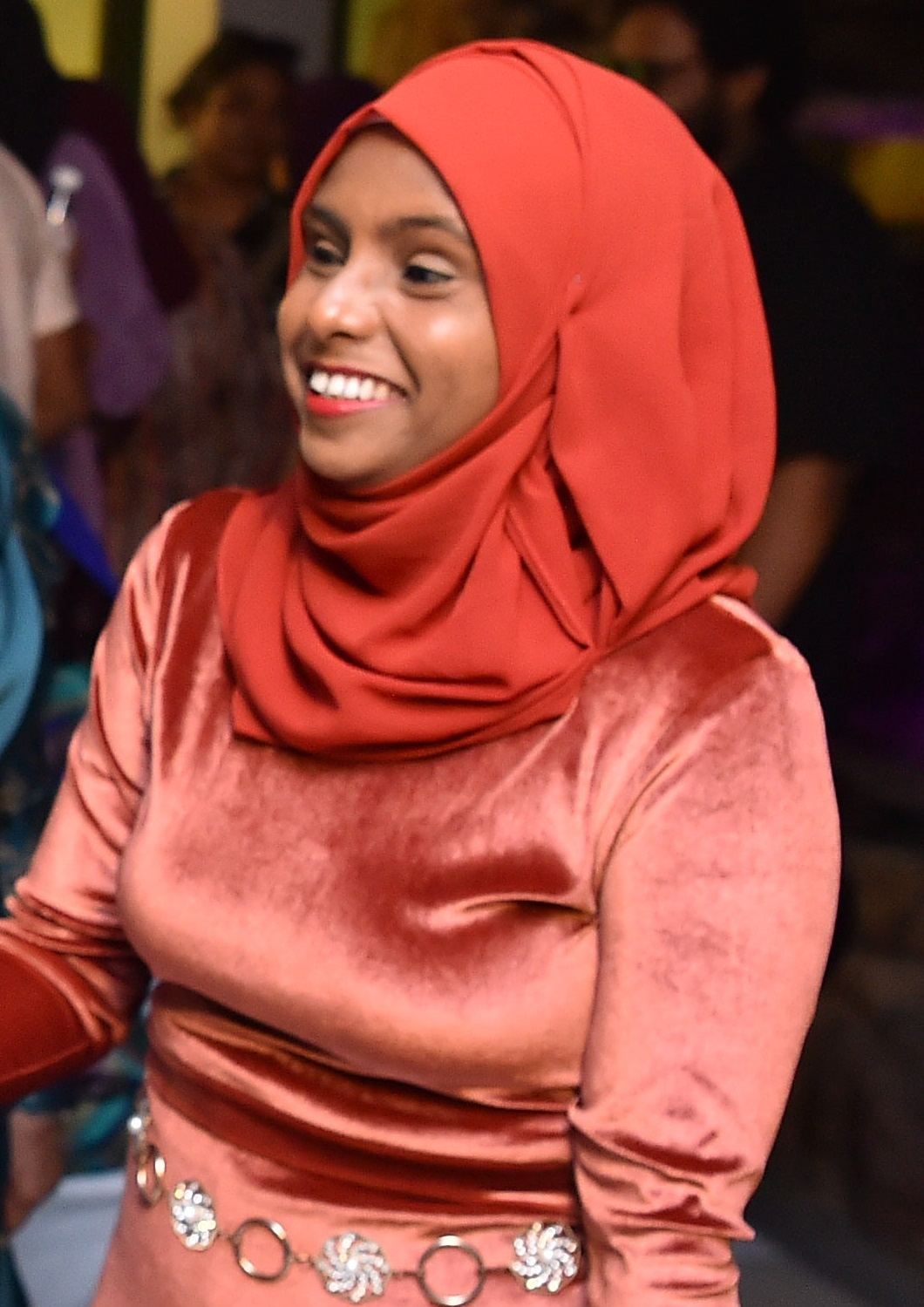
- Waheedha at the launching event of the feature film Zoya, 2023
- Born: 5 September 1984 (age 41); Malé
- Occupations: Actress, News editor
- Years active: 2019–present

Mariyam Waheedha (born 5 September 1984) is a Maldivian film actress and a news editor.

== Career ==
Prior to her acting career, Waheedha worked as a news editor.

She made her film debut in the Ravee Farooq-directed web series Ehenas, where she portrayed the character Zidhu, a colleague of a bullied and sexually abused male victim. Her performance and the series received mainly positive reviews from critics. Aishath Maahaa reviewing for Dho? wrote: "Considering [she] is a dedbutant, [she] has done an outstanding job in the series".

She then took on the role of Shiflyn, an enthusiastic and bubbly character in the office comedy sitcom Office Loabi developed by Amyna Mohamed. The series along with her performance received positive reviews from critics, where Ahmed Rasheed from MuniAvas praised Mariyam Waheedha's performance, highlighting the excellent integration of a unique concept for viewers. Following this, she made a brief appearance in Ali Seezan's web series Dhoadhi, which narrates the story of two troubled individuals and their journey to attain the love and affection they desire.

In 2023, Waheedha played supporting roles in two projects from Dark Rain Entertainment; Ahmed Zareer-directed romantic drama film Beeveema centered around the reunion of former lovers twenty-two years after their graduation, and Ali Shifau-directed romantic film Hindhukolheh. Both films received predominantly positive reviews from critics. She then collaborated with Aishath Rishmy for her romantic comedy web series Yaaraa, which explores the polar opposite lives of two sisters faced with the realities of relationships. In the series, she portrayed the character Riyaasha, an adopted child of the family seeking a heartwarming romantic relationship. She next collaborated with Ameena Ahmed for her romantic drama web series Hama Emme Meehekey, where she played the role of a gossip-loving and dependable friend.

== Filmography ==
=== Feature film ===
| Year | Title | Role | Notes | Ref(s) |
|---|---|---|---|---|
| 2023 | Beeveema | Raniya's classmate | | |
| 2023 | Hindhukolheh | Kiara's colleague | | |
| 2023 | Free Delivery | Sumaiya "Shush" | | |
| 2023 | Zoya | Zoya’s sister | | |

=== Television ===
| Year | Title | Role | Notes | Ref(s) |
|---|---|---|---|---|
| 2019–2022 | Ehenas | Zidhu | Main role; 22 episodes | |
| 2022 | Office Loabi | Shiflyn | Main role; 10 episode | |
| 2022 | Dhoadhi | Shaany | Recurring role; 4 episodes | |
| 2022 | Biruveri Vaahaka | Dheema | Main role; Episode: "Lakunu" | |
| 2023–2024 | Yaaraa | Riyaasha | Main role; 34 episodes | |
| 2023 | Hama Emme Meehekey | Nadheema | Main role; 10 episodes | |
| 2023 | Gareena | Muslima | Recurring role | |
| 2023 | Girlfriends | Herself | Guest role; Episode: "Click Click Click" | |
| 2025 | Loaiybahtakaa | Moomee | Guest role; Episode 6 | |
| 2025 | Varah Loabivey | Nisha | Recurring role; 5 episodes | |
