= Boduberu =

Maldivian music & dance

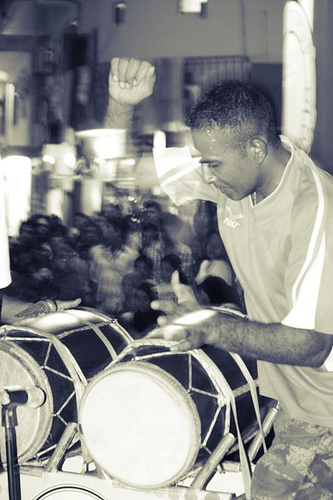
Boduberu performer

Boduberu (Dhivehi: ބޮޑުބެރު) is similar to some of the songs and dances found in east and south west Africa. It is likely that the music was introduced to The Maldives by sailors from the Indian Ocean region. It may be said that Boduberu first made an appearance in The Maldives in the 11th Century AD, or possibly before that.

== Performance ==
Boduberu is performed by about 20 people, including three drummers and a lead singer. They are accompanied by a small bell, a set of drums also known as a bodu beru, and an onugandu - a small piece of bamboo with horizontal grooves, including a few lines, from which raspy sounds are produced by scraping. The songs may be of heroism, romance or satire. The prelude to the song is a slow beat with emphasis on drumming, and dancing. As the song reaches a crescendo, one or two dancers maintain the wild beat with their frantic movements ending in some cases in a trance.

The costume of the performers is a sarong (feyli) and a white short sleeved shirt.

== Evolution ==
Boduberu evolved among the common citizens as an alternative to court music. In the early days, the people gathered together to perform Boduberu, and it became widely accepted as the music of the common people. The performing of the music is often referred as "vibrating the island". A notable point about Boduberu is its noise and sometimes meaningless lyrics sung. The lyrics do not have a meaning, because it consists of a mixture of local, neighbouring and some African words. Today, meaningful songs written in the local language Dhivehi are sung to the rhythm of Boduberu.

Boduberu is usually sung after a hard day's work. The location is up to the performers. Today, Boduberu is an important item of entertainment at stage shows, special occasions, celebrations and festivals.

== Bodu beru ==
The bodu beru is a Maldivian drum, made of wood from coconut tree trunk, and often grouped in trios. The instrument is used to accompany a dance of the same name, the Boduberu.

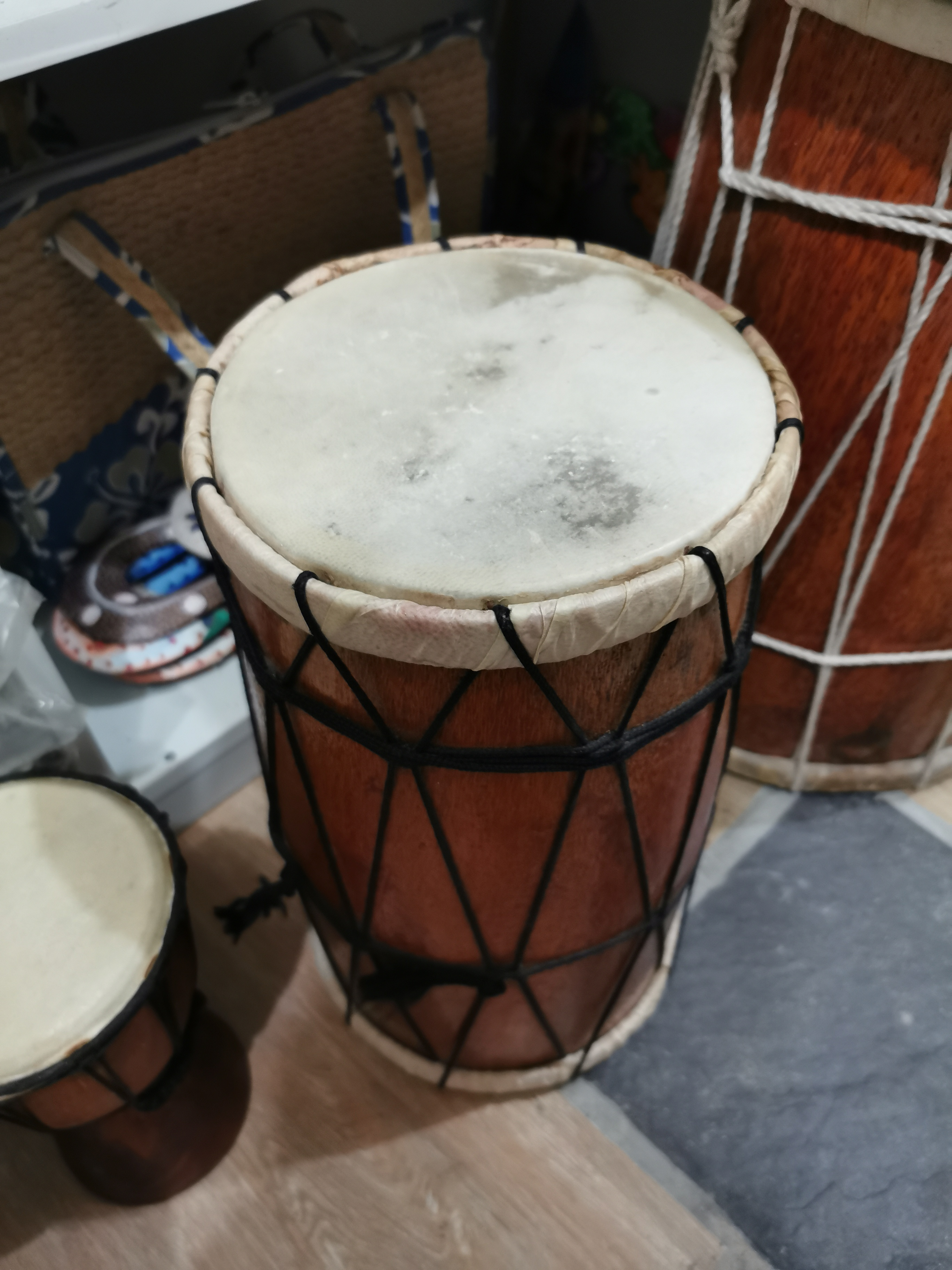
Bodu beru from coconut wood
