= Moosa Aleef =

Maldivian film actor

- Born: 23 December 1999 (age 26); L. Maavah
- Occupation: Actor
- Years active: 2022–present

Moosa Aleef (born 23 December 1999) is a Maldivian film actor.

== Career ==
Aleef initially gained recognition as a performer through social media platforms such as Musical.ly and TikTok, where he showcased his talent. He made his acting debut in 2022 with a brief role in Ali Seezan's romantic web series Dhoadhi. The series follows the story of two troubled individuals whose fates intertwine as they cross the sea in search of love and affection. The series received mostly negative reviews from critics.

In 2023, Aleef made his feature film debut with Yoosuf Shafeeu's comedy film Jokaru (2023). The film revolves around a trio of thugs pursuing a suitcase, leading to a series of comedic misadventures. Aminath Luba from The Press described it as a "laughing riot" and praised Aleef's performance, writing, "Aleef gave no space for criticism. Despite this being his debut film, he has stood out in frames shared with veteran actors". He later appeared in Aishath Rishmy romantic web series Yaaraa, where he played a colleague of the main character in a narrative about the contrasting lives of two sisters facing the realities of relationships.

In 2024, Aleef appeared in Ilyas Waheed's horror film Kanbalhi, which follows a small family whose lives unravel after moving into a sinister house in search of a fresh start. His portrayal of a possessed man in the film received positive reviews from critics. Aminath Luba from The Press described his role as "difficult yet perfectly delivered", highlighting his ability despite limited experience. Ahmed Hameed Adam from Minoos praised Aleef's "sparkling good screen presence".

He then collaborated with Ali Azzam for the action crime drama film Dheydharu Ruin (2024), addresses the issue of human trafficking—a first for Maldivian cinema. While the film received mixed reviews, Aleef's performance was widely praised. Mariyam Waheedha from Sauvees called him "an aspiring actor with the potential to be in the big league if provided with such good opportunities". Later that year, he appeared in Dark Rain Entertainment's romantic web series Roaleemay, opposite Nuzuhath Shuaib as a couple struggling with the challenges of parenthood.

== Filmography ==
Key
†	Denotes films that have not yet been released

=== Feature film ===
Year	Title	Role	Notes	Ref(s)
2023	Jokaru	Afreen		
2024	Kanbalhi	Riyaz		
2024	Bibii	Nazeeh		
2024	Dheydharu Ruin	Azim		
2025	Sorry	Ahfal	Special appearance	
2025	Alifaan	Meemu		

=== Television ===
Year	Title	Role	Notes	Ref(s)
2022	Dhoadhi	Hassan	Recurring role; 15 episodes	
2023–2024	Yaaraa	Shinaan's colleague	Recurring role; 5 episodes	
2023	Girlfriends	Contractor	Guest role; Episode: "Click Click Click"	
2024–2025	Roaleemay	Jailam	Main role; 15 episodes	
2025	Feshumaai Nimun	Hussein Rasheed	Main role; 10 episodes	
2025	Chaalaakee			
