= Zero Degree Atoll =

Maldivian music band

- Zero Degree Atoll performing in 2007

Background information
- Origin: Malé, Maldives
- Genres: World, Ethnic, Blues
- Years active: 1987 - 2016
- Labels: Tropic Records (2002); Zero Degree Atoll (2003-)
- Members: Nashid; Mohoj; Ahmed
- Website: www.zero-degree-atoll.com

Zero Degree Atoll is a Maldivian band, formed in 1987. Since their formation, the band has released three albums.

== Band history ==
From Zero Degree Atoll's website.

=== Formation ===
Zero Degree Atoll formed in 1987. Their debut song Reethi Handhuvaru was produced together with Worldview International Foundation and the Ministry of Home Affairs of the Maldives. In 1988, the band began to work on their first album.

=== Active Years ===
They represented the Maldives thrice at the International Tourism Fair (ITB) in Berlin, in 1993, 1995 and 1997.

=== Today ===
Zero Degree Atoll has disbanded after the passing of frontman Nashid in 2016.

== Discography ==
From Zero Degree Atoll's website.

- Dhoni (1996)
- Island Pulse (1997)
- Bird in Flight (2003)
