= Onugadu =

Maldivian musical instrument

The onugadu is a Maldivian musical instrument made of a piece of bamboo that is scored horizontally and rasped with a stick. One source describes it as having "an eerie, gamelan-like sound."
