= List of Maldivian films of 2021 =

This is a list of Maldivian films scheduled to be released in 2021.

== Releases ==
=== Feature film ===
†	Indicates films released on OTT platforms

Opening		Title	Director	Cast	Ref.
MAR	29	Faree †	Ahmed Hisham Saeed	Nuzuhath Shuaib, Ravee Farooq, Ahmed Easa, Fauziyya Hassan, Mohamed Yunaan	
APR	8	Maryam †	Ibrahim Wisan	Mariyam Majudha, Ahmed Saeed, Ali Azim, Ali Shazleem, Roanu Hassan Manik	

=== Television ===
Opening		Title	Director(s)	Cast	Notes	Ref.
JAN	01	Rumi á Jannat	Ali Shifau; Mohamed Faisal	Abdullah Shafiu Ibrahim, Nuzuhath Shuaib, Mohamed Faisal, Adam Rizwee, Roanu Hassan Manik, Maria Teresa Pagano, Sheela Najeeb, Ahmed Saeed	15 episodes	
APR	13	Avahteriya	Yoosuf Shafeeu	Ali Azim, Ibrahim Jihad, Ahmed Azmeel, Ahmed Easa, Ansham Mohamed, Aminath Noora, Ahmed Ziya, Ali Usam	26 episodes	
APR	15	Buneladhee	Ahmed Aman Ali	Mariyam Shahuza, Ahmed Aman Ali, Hassan Nizar, Jimshad Shareef Aminath, Nusra, Ameel, Yaamin	5 episodes	
APR	16	Hatharu Manzaru	Ravee Farooq; Abdulla Muaz; Yoosuf Shafeeu; Abbe Razzag	Mohamed Rasheed, Ali Farooq, Mohamed Samah, Mohamed Eithan Jumaih, Aishath Rishmy, Mariyam Azza, Ahmed Easa, Ahmed Sharif, Nashidha Mohamed, Aisha Ali, Ali Seezan, Nashidha Mohamed, Mohamed Ishfan, Ansham Mohamed	4 chapters	
APR	29	Aharenves Loabivey (season 2)	Mohamed Aboobakuru	Ibrahim Sobah, Fathimath Shama, Hamid Ali, Mohamed Shafiu, Sujeetha Abdulla, Aishath Thuhufa	7 episodes	
JUN	22	Nafsu	Ali Shazleem	Ahmed Saeed, Mariyam Shifa, Ali Shazleem, Mariyam Shakeela, Nashidha Mohamed	10 episodes	
JUL	26	Mazloom	Ilyas Waheed	Nuzuhath Shuaib, Ahmed Ifnaz Firag, Sharaf Abdulla, Washiya Mohamed, Ahmed Sharif, Mohamed Mahil, Nathasha Jaleel, Ravee Farooq, Thaathi Adam, Zuwail Ali Thoriq, Mariyam Azza, Aisha Ali	4 chapters	
AUG	12	Girlfriends (season 1)	Ibrahim Wisan	Maiha Adam, Aishath Lahfa, Aisha Ali, Ahmed Sharif	12 episodes	
AUG	26	Loabi Vias	Mohamed Faisal	Mohamed Faisal, Nashidha Mohamed, Nuzuhath Shuaib, Ahmed Easa, Mariyam Majudha, Ahmed Asim	8 episodes	
SEP	7	Giridha	Yoosuf Shafeeu	Ibrahim Jihad, Ali Azim, Ahmed Ziya, Ali Usam, Aminath Noora, Shima	15 episodes	
OCT	21	Sirru	Mohamed Aboobakuru	Ahmed Asim, Hawwa Shadhiya, Aminath Shuha, Ahmed Emau, Ahmed Shareef	5 episodes	
DEC	07	Giritee Loabi	Ali Shifau	Mohamed Vishal, Aminath Rashfa, Mohamed Manik, Mohamed Faisal, Adam Rizwee	20 episodes	
DEC	22	Noontha?	Ahmed Iqbal	Nuzuhath Shuaib, Ahmed Asim, Adhuham Layaal Qasim, Washiya Mohamed	6 episodes	

=== Short film ===
Opening		Title	Director	Cast	Ref.
JAN	01	Feehaali	Moomin Fuad	Ismail Rasheed, Mohamed Zuhury, Ahmed Ishar, Ali Fizam, Washiya Mohamed, Nathasha Jaleel, Anoof Ali Musthafa	
JUN	30	Gulhun	Aishath Fuad Thaufeeq	Ravee Farooq, Aishath Rishmy, Abdullah Shafiu Ibrahim, Aminath Rashfa, Aminath Shamana, Ahmed Saeed, Ismail Jumaih	
NOV	03	O' Wazan	Ali Shamin	Ismail Rasheed, Washiya Mohamed, Mohamed Athik	
DEC	31	Next To You	Naaisha Nashid	Fathimath Sara Adam, Farhad Ibrahim	

== See also ==
- List of Maldivian films of 2020
- Lists of Maldivian films
- List of Maldivian films of 2022
