= List of Maldivian films of 2020 =

This is a list of Maldivian films released in 2020. Several projects that were announced to release during the year were delayed indefinitely and some were pushed for 2021 releases, due to COVID-19 pandemic.

== Releases ==
=== Theatrical releases ===
Opening		Title	Director	Cast	Ref.
MAR	4	Andhirikan	Ali Seezan	Ali Seezan, Aminath Rishfa, Sheela Najeeb, Zeenath Abbas, Ahmed Saeed	

=== Digital and television releases ===
Opening		Title	Director(s)	Cast	Notes
JAN	30	Huvaa (season 2)	Fathimath Nahula, Yoosuf Shafeeu	Aminath Rishfa, Mohamed Faisal, Mariyam Azza, Abdulla Muaz, Ahmed Easa, Sheela Najeeb, Ahmed Azmeel, Ali Azim, Irufana Ibrahim, Nashidha Mohamed	20 episodes
FEB	27	Hanaa	Amjad Ibrahim	Ali Azim, Aminath Noora, Ibrahim Jihad, Ali Shameel, Qulishthaan Mohamed, Fathimath Latheef	13 episodes
JUL	03	Furabandhu	Ali Seezan	Nashidha Mohamed, Ali Seezan, Washiya Mohamed, Ibrahim Naseer	5 episodes
SEP	25	Gamini	Moomin Fuad	Ahmed Asim, Ismail Rasheed, Mariyam Shakeela, Yoosuf Rafeeu, Aminath Nisha Rasheed	13 episodes
OCT	28	Karu Hakuru (season 3)	Mohamed Munthasir	Raufath Sodhiq, Aminath Lamha Latheef, Hussain Nazim, Ali Azim, Aisha Ali, Mohamed Afrah	12 episodes
DEC	27	Huvaa Kohfa Bunan	Yoosuf Shafeeu	Ahmed Saeed, Nashidha Mohamed, Ali Azim, Ahmed Easa, Mohamed Faisal, Abdullah Shafiu Ibrahim, Mariyam Shifa, Washiya Mohamed, Ahmed Azmeel	26 episodes

=== Short film ===
Opening		Title	Director	Cast	Ref.
MAY	22	KKB: Kuda Kuda Baaru	Ahmed Azmeel	Roanu Hassan Manik, Fathimath Sara Adam, Ismail Jumaih, Aishath Rishmy, Ismail Aziel Azmeel, Ravee Farooq, Arifa Ibrahim, Ahmed Saeed, Fathimath Azifa, Ahmed Azmeel, Aminath Rasheedha, Mariyam Afeefa, Reeko Moosa Manik, Niuma Mohamed	
OCT	01	Dhauvathu	Ali Shifau	Hoodh Ibrahim, Mariyam Shifa, Ahmed Sunie	
OCT	14	Anguru	Ali Shifau	Aminath Silna, Roanu Hassan Manik	
DEC	4	Thadhu	Shamin Nizam	Ravee Farooq, Aishath Rishmy, Mariyam Haleem, Ali Farooq, Aisha Ali, Nathasha Jaleel	

== See also ==
- List of Maldivian films of 2019
- Lists of Maldivian films
