= List of Maldivian films of 2019 =

This is a list of Maldivian films released in 2019.

== Releases ==
=== Theatrical releases ===
Opening		Title	Director	Cast	Ref.
JAN	3	Nivairoalhi	Moomin Fuad	Niuma Mohamed, Yoosuf Shafeeu, Ahmed Asim, Aminath Rishfa, Zeenath Abbas, Ahmed Saeed, Nashidha Mohamed, Ahmed Azmeel, Mariyam Shakeela, Aminath Rasheedha	
FEB	1	Kan'du Ibilees	Ismail Rasheed	Ismail Rasheed, Ahmed Ziya	
FEB	4	Goh Raalhu	Ahmed Sinan	Mohamed Jumayyil, Hassan Irfan, Aishath Thasneema, Aminath Rashfa, Nuzuhath Shuaib	
MAR	5	40+	Yoosuf Shafeeu	Yoosuf Shafeeu, Ali Seezan, Mohamed Manik, Ahmed Saeed, Sheela Najeeb, Fathimath Azifa, Ali Azim, Mariyam Shakeela, Nuzuhath Shuaib	
APR	9	Nafrathuvumun	Yoosuf Shafeeu	Mariyam Azza, Ali Azim, Ahmed Easa, Yoosuf Shafeeu	
JUN	12	Dhauvath	Yoosuf Shafeeu	Mariyam Azza, Ali Azim, Ahmed Easa, Mohamed Faisal	
JUL	1	Maamui	Ali Shifau	Sheela Najeeb, Mohamed Jumayyil, Mariyam Azza, Mariyam Majudha, Ismail Jumaih, Ahmed Shakir, Adam Rizwee, Abdullah Shafiu Ibrahim, Nuzuhath Shuaib	
JUL	23	Leena	Abdulla Muaz	Mariyam Azza, Abdulla Muaz, Ali Azim, Nuzuhath Shuaib, Ahmed Saeed, Zeenath Abbas, Ahmed Nimal, Sheela Najeeb, Mariyam Haleem	
SEP	2	Bavathi	Ilyas Waheed	Nuzuhath Shuaib, Ahmed Ifnaz Firag	
SEP	24	Kaaku?	Mohamed Aboobakuru	Ibrahim Sobah, Shafiu Mohamed, Irufana Ibrahim, Aishath Yasira	

=== Television ===
Opening		Title	Director	Cast	Notes	Ref.
MAR	12	Karu Hakuru	Mohamed Munthasir	Raufath Sadiq, Lamha Latheef, Hussain Nazim, Ali Azim, Aishath Ali	12 Episodes	
MAY	7	Gellunu Furaana	Yoosuf Shafeeu	Ali Azim, Irufana Ibrahim, Ali Shahid, Aminath Ziyadha	6 Episodes	
MAY	10	Shhh	Amjad Ibrahim	Ahmed Azmeel, Sheela Najeeb, Zeenath Abbas, Ahmed Shaaz, Irufana Ibrahim	5 Episodes	
MAY	11	Aharenves Loabivey	Mohamed Aboobakuru	Mohamed Aboobakuru, Aishath Yasir, Ibrahim Sobah, Mariyam Haleem, Ali Farooq	5 Episodes	
JUN	4	Mhendhan	Hussain Nooradeen	Aminath Nisha Rasheed, Ajnaaz Ali, Mariyam Shakeela, Ahmed Asim	5 Episodes	
JUL	16	Ehenas	Ravee Farooq	Mohamed Vishal, Aishath Rishmy, Ahmed Maseeh, Fathimath Sara Adam, Sheela Najeeb, Mohamed Manik	10 Episodes	
AUG	11	Yes Sir	Ali Seezan	Mohamed Manik, Aminath Nishfa, Nuzuhath Shuaib, Ali Azim, Irufana Ibrahim, Ismail Jumaih, Mohamed Nawaal, Zeenath Abbas, Fahudh, Mohamed Faisal	10 Episodes	
OCT	1	Hatharu Halha	Moomin Fuad; Ravee Farooq; Ali Shifau; Abdul Faththaah	Ali Ibrahim, Niuma Mohamed, Mariyam Majudha, Aminath Rishfa, Ismail Rasheed, Fathimath Fareela, Mariyam Shakeela	4 Short Films	
NOV	13	Maayoos	Ajunaz Ali	Niuma Mohamed, Ismail Rasheed, Mohamed Jumayyil	14 Episodes	
NOV	14	Haasaa	Mohamed Manik	Fathimath Azifa, Ali Shameel, Ibrahim Jihad, Mariyam Shifa	13 Episodes	

== See also ==
- List of Maldivian films of 2020
- List of Maldivian films of 2018
- Lists of Maldivian films
