= Ali Usam =

Maldivian actor

- Occupations: Actor, model, host
- Years active: 2019–present (acting)

Ali Usam, commonly known as Dhona, is a Maldivian film actor, model and TV presenter.

== Career ==
Usam began his professional career as a model in 2009 before starting to work as a host in several television shows. He made his career debut in Ravee Farooq-directed web series Ehenas which follows the experiences of a long-term domestic and sexually abused male victim and how he faces the societal obstacles of marriage. Aishath Maahaa reviewing from Dho? was generally impressed with the acting performance of the newcomers including Usam, though he had a very brief role. He then played the role of a politician who is competing for a seat in People's Majlis, in Yoosuf Shafeeu's comedy drama series Huvaa Kohfa Bunan. Mariyam Dheema reviewing from MuniAvas praised his acting skills and looks, and commented "with this role he has proved that directors can mold him to play any kind of role".

In 2021, he again collaborated with Shafeeu for two projects; Avahteriya and Giridha, alongside Ibrahim Jihad, Ali Azim, Ahmed Zia, Aminath Noora and Ansham Mohamed. In the comedy series Avahteriya, he played the role of Raseem, a client who is manipulated to find his dream girl, while in the latter, he played the role of an aspiring screenwriter, who along with his two other friends scheme to influence their leaser to finance for their dream to work in the film industry.

The following year he collaborated with Ilyas Waheed for two projects, including the four-part anthology web series Mazloom. Mariyam Waheedha from Dhen praised the performance of Usam, while calling the chapter an "honorable conclusion" to a benchmark project. This was followed by Azhan Ibrahim's crime thriller web series Dharaka (2022) which revolves around a high-profile case of the disappearance of a politician's daughter. Reviewing the finale of the series, Ahmed Rasheed from MuniAvas considered the series to be an "excellent watch, if you are interested in good quality series". The year marks his second collaboration with Ilyas Waheed for his horror thriller anthology web series Biruveri Vaahaka as Zedey, a traumatized survivor of a sea incident.

== Filmography ==
=== Television ===
Year	Title	Role	Notes	Ref(s)
2019–2020	Ehenas	Nafiz	Recurring role; 22 episodes	
2020–2021	Huvaa Kohfa Bunan	Arushad	Recurring role; 7 episodes	
2021	Avahteriya	Raseen	Main role; 26 episodes	
2021–present	Girlfriends	Faya	Recurring role; 5 episodes	
2021	Giridha	Mafaaz	Main role; 15 episodes	
2022	Mazloom	Aroosh	Main role in "Chapter 4: Hintha"	
2022	Dharaka	Zayan	Recurring role; 4 episodes	
2022	Biruveri Vaahaka	Zalif "Zedey"	Main role; Episode: "Mas Dhathuru"	
2023	Hiy Kalaayah Edheythee	Mahid	Main role; 13 episodes	
2023	Yaaraa	Dhona	Guest role; "Episode 1"	
2024–2025	Raiha	Azeem	Main role; 12 episodes	
