= Nafrathuvumun =

- Official film poster
- Directed by: Yoosuf Shafeeu
- Written by: Yoosuf Shafeeu
- Screenplay by: Yoosuf Shafeeu
- Produced by: Yoosuf Shafeeu
- Starring: Mariyam Azza; Ali Azim; Ahmed Easa; Yoosuf Shafeeu
- Cinematography: Ibrahim Moosa
- Edited by: Yoosuf Shafeeu
- Music by: Abdul Basith
- Production company: Eupe Productions
- Release date: 9 April 2019
- Country: Maldives
- Language: Dhivehi

Nafrathuvumun is a 2019 Maldivian romantic film written and directed by Yoosuf Shafeeu. Produced by Shafeeu under Eupe Productions, the film stars Mariyam Azza, Ali Azim, Ahmed Easa and Yoosuf Shafeeu in pivotal roles. The film was released on 9 April 2019.

== Premise ==
Reesha (Mariyam Azza), a wealthy businesswoman goes bankrupt and is strongly determined not to sell her guesthouse, though her husband Lamiu (Ahmed Easa) continuously persuade her to sell the property. Convinced by her friend, Maaniu (Yoosuf Shafeeu), Reesha agrees to rent the guesthouse for a long term to Shamin (Ali Azim). Unintentionally, Reesha grows closer to Shamin and seeks divorce from Lamiu.

== Cast ==
- Yoosuf Shafeeu as Maaniu
- Mariyam Azza as Reesha
- Ali Azim as Shamin
- Ahmed Easa as Lamiu
- Ahmed Saeed as Zameer
- Hussain Nasif as a gang member
- Assam Ahmed as a gang member

== Development ==
The project was announced on 5 September 2018 in an event held to celebrate V Media's tenth anniversary. In December 2018, reports revealed that the film will star Mariyam Azza, Ali Azim and Ahmed Easa in the lead roles while Shafeeu will star in a supporting role. Filming took place in B. Dharavandhoo simultaneously with another project, Dhauvath (2019) which was also directed by Shafeeu and starring Azza, Azim and Easa in the main roles. Filming was completed in late December 2018. The release date of the film was announced to be 9 April 2019.

== Soundtrack ==
Track listing
No.	Title	Lyrics	Music	Singer(s)	Length
1.	"Loabi Vaavaru"	Ismail Affan	Hassan Jalaal	Ismail Affan
2.	"Saadhaa Mooney Thee"	Easa Shareef	Munaz Zubair	Ahmed Reehan

== Release and response ==
The teaser trailer of the film was released on 1 March 2019 while the official trailer was released on 3 April 2019. The film was released on 9 April 2019. The film released mixed to positive reviews from critics. Mariyam Waheedha from Miadhu Daily wrote: "In an event of twists and turns and powerful performances, the film succeeds in grabbing the attention of the audience in its right way ". Ifraz Ali from Dho? chose the film among the best five films released during the year and noted: "The film revolving around love and revenge, the director has chosen a different yet engaging concept, but fails to bring the best from actors".
