= Raiha =

Maldivian web series

- Written by: Aminath Rinaza
- Screenplay by: Aminath Rinaza
- Directed by: Ali Rasheed
- Starring: Ali Azim; Aminath Noora; Ali Usam; Aishath Laisha Latheef
- Music by: Ahmed Aiham
- Country of origin: Maldives
- Original language: Divehi
- No. of seasons: 1
- No. of episodes: 12

Production
- Producer: Sun Siyam Media
- Cinematography: Ali Rasheed; Mohamed Shaan
- Editor: Ali Rasheed
- Running time: 15-25 minutes

Original release
- Release: November 28, 2024 – March 6, 2025

Raiha is a Maldivian romantic web series directed by Ali Rasheed. It stars Ali Azim, Aminath Noora, Ali Usam and Aishath Laisha Latheef in main roles. The pilot episode of the series was released on 28 November 2024.

== Premise ==
The film follows a gripping love triangle as Yaanih, a sly and ambitious young man, returns to the island and plans to start a relationship with Raiha, a woman in a volatile relationship with her short-tempered and overly protective boyfriend, Azeem. Determined to win Raiha and settle a personal score with Azeem, Yaanih sets out to charm her and undermine their relationship. As Azeem's controlling behavior intensifies, Raiha finds herself gradually drawn toward Yaanih. The story unravels as tensions rise, blurring the lines between love, manipulation, and vengeance.

== Cast and characters ==
=== Main ===
- Ali Azim as Yaanih
- Aminath Noora as Raiha
- Ali Usam as Azeem
- Aishath Laisha Latheef as Zaara
- Ibrahim Fairooz as Fahudh
- Ahmed Ifdhaau as Yafiu
- Arifa Ali as Haamidha

=== Recurring ===
- Ibrahim Latheef as Maajidh
- Afeefa Adam as Marina
- Mariyam Lamsa Latheef as Maahi
- Ali Munaz as Hamdhan; Azeem's friend

=== Guest ===
- Aishath Ahmed
- Ahmed Easa

== Episodes ==
No.	Title	Directed by	Original release date
1	"Episode 1"	Ali Rasheed	November 28, 2024
Yaanih, a sly and ambitious young man, returns to M. Mulah after years away. Upon arrival, he becomes captivated by Raiha, the elder daughter of a wealthy and reputable family, despite her ongoing relationship with Azeem, a resort worker. Yaanih fabricates stories about his income and keeps his true dealings hidden from his family. Meanwhile, his younger brother, Yafiu, grows suspicious of Yaanih’s motives.
2	"Episode 2"	Ali Rasheed	December 5, 2024
Yaanih remains determined to win Raiha’s heart, despite her being in a relationship with Azeem. Ignoring her clear boundaries, he calls her, only for Raiha to lash out, firmly stating she doesn’t want to meet him. Meanwhile, a resident of the island falls prey to a bank scam, leaving the community in distress. Raiha’s parents, known for their generosity, decide to step forward and offer their support to the victim.
3	"Episode 3"	Ali Rasheed	December 12, 2024
Yaanih’s friend Fahudh also becomes a victim of a similar bank scam, losing a significant amount of money. At home, tensions rise as Yaanih and his younger brother Yafiu argue over their family responsibilities, each blaming the other for being careless and failing to support their household.
4	"Episode 4"	Ali Rasheed	December 19, 2024
Yaanih secretly continues his illegal activities while Fahudh, eager to escape his financial troubles, convinces Yaanih to include him in his schemes. During a beach outing, Raiha nearly drowns, and Yaanih rescues her just as Azeem arrives, leading to a confrontation between the two. Raiha begins resenting Azeem, giving Yaanih an opening to further his plan to drive them apart and avenge his rivalry with Azeem.
5	"Episode 5"	Ali Rasheed	December 28, 2024
Tensions escalate as Raiha grows resentful of Azeem’s lack of trust, while Azeem becomes increasingly suspicious of Raiha’s concern for Yaanih. During a volleyball match, Azeem catches Yaanih watching Raiha, prompting him to demand that she stop playing altogether. This creates further strain in their relationship, leaving Raiha feeling stifled and misunderstood.
6	"Episode 6"	Ali Rasheed	January 2, 2025
Raiha, frustrated with Azeem's suspicions, decides to have coffee with Yaanih to provoke his jealousy. She brings Zara along, but the outing quickly becomes tense. Zara is visibly uncomfortable and angry, as she despises Yaanih due to the strained relationship between him and Yafiu, her boyfriend.
7	"Episode 7"	Ali Rasheed	January 16, 2025
Azeem learns about Raiha’s meeting with Yaanih and becomes furious. Confronting Raiha, he accuses her of betraying him, but Raiha defends herself, arguing that she desires freedom and a partner who trusts her. This deepens the rift between them. Azeem, feeling threatened, confronts Yaanih and warns him to stay away from Raiha. Meanwhile, Yaanih’s world begins to crumble when his close friend is arrested for alleged drug abuse following a police report.
8	"Episode 8"	Ali Rasheed	January 30, 2025
Azeem lashes out at Yaanih for meddling in his relationship with Raiha, warning him to stay away. Meanwhile, Haamidha talks to Raiha, urging her to stay with Azeem as troubling rumors about Yaanih have begun to spread. Frustrated, Raiha lashes out at her mother and sister, resenting their interference in her personal life. As tensions rise, Raiha defiantly declares that she will marry Yaanih, even if it means going against her family’s wishes.
9	"Episode 9"	Ali Rasheed	February 6, 2025
Raiha ultimately marries Yaanih but soon realizes that their living standards do not meet her expectations. Her family struggles emotionally, going through a depressing phase due to her decision. Meanwhile, Azeem asks his friend Hamdhan to check CCTV footage that could expose Yaanih’s illegal activities. Four months later, Yaanih’s behavior starts to change, causing distress to Raiha as she begins to question her choices.
10	"Episode 10"	Ali Rasheed	February 13, 2025
Raiha becomes pregnant, but Yaanih refuses to have the child, citing financial struggles. Meanwhile, Zara ends her relationship with Yafiu after her parents disapprove of any ties with Yaanih. As more people from his network get arrested, Yaanih grows increasingly fearful that his illegal activities will soon be exposed.
11	"Episode 11"	Ali Rasheed	February 20, 2025
That night, the police raid Yaanih’s home, discovering drugs hidden in his wardrobe, leading to his arrest. Haamidha pleads with Maajidh to bring Raiha back home, but he refuses, believing she needs to learn a lesson. At the hospital, the doctor reveals that the baby has not grown for the past three months due to strong medication, putting the pregnancy at risk. Shocked, Raiha recalls moments when Yaanih mixed medicines into her drinks, realizing the betrayal.
12	"Episode 12"	Ali Rasheed	March 6, 2025
Raiha suffers a heartbreaking miscarriage, leaving her devastated. In her pain, she finally realizes the depth of Azeem’s love and the unwavering support of her family. Overcome with regret, she seeks forgiveness from them. Despite the past, her family embraces her with open arms, welcoming her back with love and understanding.

== Development ==
The project was officially launched on 5 July 2024. This was announced as the first original series produced by SunSiyam Media for commercial purposes. Filming took place in M. Mulah. Except for the main lead including Ali Azim, Aminath Noora and Ali Usam, majority of the cast are people from Mulah.

== Soundtrack ==
Track listing
No.	Title	Singer(s)	Length
1.	"Ihsaas"	Mohamed Maisaan	6:21

== Release ==
The first episode of the series was released on 28 November 2024. Upon release, it mainly received negative response from critics for the weak screenplay, poor performance and over the top acting. The series consists of total twelve episodes.
