= Udhabaani 2 =

2024 Maldivian film

- Official film poster
- Directed by: Amjad Ibrahim
- Written by: Mohamed Gasim
- Screenplay by: Amjad Ibrahim
- Produced by: Hamid Ali
- Starring: Ahmed Easa; Aminath Shuha; Hamid Ali; Ali Azim; Nathasha Jaleel; Ali Shameel; Mariyam Shakeela; Mariyam Haleem
- Cinematography: Hassan Haleem
- Edited by: Ali Musthafa
- Production company: Learner's Production
- Release date: 19 September 2024
- Running time: 150 minutes
- Country: Maldives
- Language: Dhivehi

Udhabaani 2 is a 2024 Maldivian horror film directed by Amjad Ibrahim. Produced by Hamid Ali under Learner's Production, the film stars Hamid Ali in reprising his role as Adamfulhu while Ahmed Easa, Aminath Shuha, Ali Azim and Nathasha Jaleel featuring in main roles. The film was released on 19 September 2024.

Written by Mohamed Gasim and Amjad Ibrahim, the film follows a married couple, Lathafa and Laamiu, whose lives are upended by a supernatural entity disguising itself as a friend to sow discord between them. As Laamiu uncovers the truth and teams up with the real friend, they break the curse and restore their love.

== Plotline ==
Lathafa and Laamiu, once deeply in love, find their marital bliss disrupted by an unrelenting supernatural entity. Desperate to escape its grasp, they relocate to N. Landhoo, a serene island where Laamiu secures a job at a family friend's shop. There, he befriends Shareef, a kind and hardworking colleague. Meanwhile, Lathafa encounters Moosafulhu, a man strikingly similar to her late father, Adamfulhu. Discovering he is her impoverished uncle, she takes it upon herself to care for him, hoping to find solace in doing good.

One day, Shareef expresses concern over the amulet Lathafa wears, warning it might harbor a dark presence. Persuading her to replace it with another, he hands her a new amulet, which she wears without Laamiu’s knowledge. From that moment, Lathafa’s feelings toward Laamiu begin to shift. Her affection fades, replaced by a growing attachment to Shareef. Confused and heartbroken, Laamiu is blindsided when Lathafa demands a divorce, her devotion now firmly with Shareef. Oblivious to the sinister influence behind her change, Laamiu struggles to make sense of his crumbling world.

When Laamiu starts piecing together the puzzle, he discovers that the Shareef who befriended them is an imposter—a supernatural being that manipulated events to sow discord between them. Teaming up with the real Shareef, who had been displaced and trapped by the entity, Laamiu uncovers the dark magic tied to the amulet and the creature's true intent. They devise a daring plan to break the curse and banish the entity once and for all.

== Cast ==
- Ahmed Easa as Lamiu
- Aminath Shuha as Lathafa
- Hamid Ali as Moosafulhu
- Ali Azim as Shareef
- Nathasha Jaleel as Nathasha
- Ali Shameel as Ibrahimfulhu
- Mariyam Shakeela as Laamiu's mother
- Mariyam Haleem as Dhondhaitha
- Mohamed Waheed as Maajid
- Ali Farooq as Alifulhube (Special appearance)
- Shaha Adhunaan as Nazima (Special appearance)

== Production ==
=== Development ===
Following the commercial success of Udhabaani (2009), director Amjad Ibrahim and producer Hamid Ali began working on the development of a sequel in 2013. They initiated the process of budget acquisition and brainstormed potential storylines for the movie. Initially, Ibrahim intended to start filming Udhabaani 2 in mid-2017, after completing his ongoing project, titled Dheythee Aniyaa. However, due to various delays in pre-production and his prior commitments to other films, the pre-production of Udhabaani 2 was postponed indefinitely. To craft the plot for the sequel, Mohamed Gasim, the writer of the first installment, was brought in to develop the storyline. The team also contemplated the possibility of a third installment in the film series. Hussain Sobah was hired as the music composer, similar to his role in the first film. By 2017, Sobah had composed five original songs, including the theme song for the sequel. The film was officially re-launched in July 2023 with a new cast. Post-production of the film commenced in October 2023 while majority of the editing work by Ali Musthafa was completed by October 2023.

=== Casting ===
In 2020, director Amjad Ibrahim announced that Yoosuf Shafeeu would reprise his role, and Hamid Ali would return, but Amira Ismail would be replaced by a new actress due to her absence from the film industry at the time. However, as the project faced further delays, Ibrahim and producer Hamid Ali later approached Yoosuf Shafeeu and Amira Ismail to return to their roles in Udhabaani 2. Nevertheless, as the screenplay called for an immediate continuation from the events of the first installment and considering the physical changes that had occurred during the twelve-year gap, the original actors declined the offer and suggested casting new actors for their roles. In July 2023, the new cast was officially announced, including Ahmed Easa, Aminath Shuha, Ali Azim, Nathasha Jaleel, Ali Shameel, Mariyam Shakeela and Mariyam Haleem, while Hamid Ali was confirmed to reprise his role.

=== Filming ===
Initially, Ibrahim planned to finalize the cast and commence filming after Ramadan in 2020. However, due to COVID-19 pandemic, the project was put on hold, and several changes were needed, including reworking the cast, before the film could proceed. The crew departed to R. Maakurathu on 10 July 2022 to begin filming. First schedule of filming was wrapped up in September 2023. The second schedule of filming commenced in November 2023 and was completed by the end of the year.

== Soundtrack ==
Track listing
No.	Title	Lyrics	Music	Singer(s)	Length
1.	"Vaashey Kalaa"	Ismail Mubarik	Hussain Sobah
2.	"Thiyaey Thiyaey Nufili Handhaaney"	Ahmed Nashid	Hussain Sobah	Ibrahim Zaid Ali, Shifa Thaufeeq
3.	"Alhe Gaigaa Dhen Beehilaashey"	Ahmed Nashid	Hussain Sobah	Mumthaz Moosa, Fathimath Zoona
4.	"Libenee Sazaa" (Female Version)	Mohamed Abdul Ghanee	Hussain Sobah	Nashidha Ahmed
5.	"Keiynuvaavaru Loabin Magey Hiyy"	Ismail Mubarik	Hussain Sobah	Hassan Ilham, Fathimath Rauf
6.	"Libenee Sazaa" (Male Version)	Mohamed Abdul Ghanee	Hussain Sobah	Mohamed Abdul Ghanee

== Release ==
Udhabaani 2 was released theatrically on 19 September 2024.
