= Balgish =

Maldivian web series

- Written by: Aminath Rinaza
- Screenplay by: Aminath Rinaza
- Directed by: Ahmed Nimal
- Country of origin: Maldives
- Original language: Divehi
- No. of seasons: 1
- No. of episodes: 5

Production
- Producer: Mohamed Abdulla
- Cinematography: Ali Rasheed
- Editor: Ali Rasheed
- Production company: Dhekedheke Ves Production

Original release
- Release: July 7 – August 4, 2022

Balgish is a Maldivian romantic web series written by Aminath Rinaza and directed by Ahmed Nimal. It stars Mariyam Shifa, Ali Azim, Nimal, Arifa Ali and Amira Ismail in main roles. The pilot episode of the series was released on 7 July 2022. The fives episodes' series narrates the life of an unfortunate child and the misfortunes which surrounds her.

== Cast and characters ==
=== Main ===
- Mariyam Shifa as Haaya
- Ali Azim as Arham
- Ahmed Nimal as Farooq Hassan
- Arifa Ali as Ameena
- Amira Ismail as Fathun

=== Recurring ===
- Abdulla Mahir as Shan
- Maasha
- Aishath Mahmoodh as Shakeela
- Nahula

=== Guest ===
- Abdulla Naseer as the Judge (Episode 5)

== Episodes ==
| No. | Title | Directed by | Original release date |
|---|---|---|---|
| 1 | "Episode 1" | Ahmed Nimal | July 7, 2022 |
Farooq (Ahmed Nimal), a resort supplier, lives with his only daughter, Haaya and his second wife, Fathun (Amira Ismail), who continues having extramarital affairs when Farooq is away at work. Haaya catches her stepmother having affair with other men, which leads to huge disagreements and conflicts between the two women. When Haaya tells her father about Fathun's abuse and affairs, Farooq throws Haaya out of the house, accusing her of being direspectful and stubborn.
| 2 | "Episode 2" | Ahmed Nimal | July 14, 2022 |
Haaya's maternal aunt, Ameena (Arifa Al) takes Haaya to her house. Meanwhile, Ameena's friend, Shakeela (Aishath Mahmoodh) requests to let her son, Arham (Ali Azim) stays at her place for a while, where he meets Haaya. Arham, being romantically attracted to Haaya, expresses his feelings in front of her.
| 3 | "Episode 3" | Ahmed Nimal | July 21, 2022 |
Ameena catches Haaya and Arham meeting in the backyard and advises her to end their romantic relationship. In spite of that, they both continue their relationship. Farooq finds out about their affair and determines to never let them marry each other.
| 4 | "Episode 4" | Ahmed Nimal | July 28, 2022 |
Haaya is found to be pregnant, much to the discomfort of Ameena. Haaya plans to use medication to abort the child but Ameena stops her and advises her to repent. Ameena and Arham stick with Haaya when the whole community turns against her. Enraged, Farooq assaults Arham while he was relaxing on the beach.
| 5 | "Episode 5" | Ahmed Nimal | August 4, 2022 |
Arham is taken to the hospital where he was diagnosed to have suffered from post-traumatic stress disorder which causes a short term memory loss. Arham's brother, Shan (Abdulla Mahir) seeks revenge on the person behind the attach on his brother. Meanwhile, Farooq catches his wife with another man and divorces her on the spot. Few months later, Farooq was found to be guilty of the assault and is jailed. Haaya gives birth to a daughter, Balgish, but dies during labor. As promised, Ameena looks after Balgish as a child of her own.

== Development ==
The project was announced on 14 March 2022 as a five-episode romantic television drama series planned for telecast during Ramadan 1443 on Channel 13. Filming for the series took place in R. Dhuvaafaru and R. Maakurathu. Filming was completed in March 2022.

== Soundtrack ==
Track listing
| No. | Title | Music | Singer(s) | Length |
|---|---|---|---|---|
| 1. | "Title Track" | Hussain Sobah | Aminath Raya Ashraf |

== Release and reception ==
The first episode of the series was made available for streaming through digital streaming platform Medianet Multi Screen on 7 July 2022. The series received mixed to positive reviews from critics, where Amira Ismail's performance as an evil step-mother was particularly praised.
