= Dhoadhi =

Maldivian web series

- Written by: Ahmed Zareer; Aminath Rinaza
- Directed by: Ali Seezan
- Music by: Ibrahim Nifar
- Country of origin: Maldives
- Original language: Divehi
- No. of seasons: 1
- No. of episodes: 15

Production
- Cinematography: Shivaz Abdulla; Samah; Ahmed Giyas
- Editors: Ali Seezan; Ahmed Giyas
- Production company: SProductions

Original release
- Release: April 14 – July 21, 2022

Dhoadhi is a Maldivian web series directed by Ali Seezan. It stars Ahmed Easa, Ansham Mohamed, Aminath Noora and Mohamed Rasheed in main roles. The pilot episode of the first season was released on 14 April 2022 and was concluded on 21 July 2022. It consists of fifteen episodes, each of approximately 20 minutes. The series follows the fate of two troubled humans and how fate makes them cross the sea to attain the love and affection they desire.

== Cast and characters ==
=== Main ===
- Mohamed Rasheed as Mohamed; Ayya's father
- Ahmed Easa as Ali Mohamed "Ayya"
- Ansham Mohamed as Manal
- Aminath Noora as Azeeza "Azu"

=== Recurring ===
- Moosa Aleef as Hassan
- Mariyam Sana as Sham
- Fathimath Latheefa as Mariyam
- Mohamed Rifshan as Shamin
- Hamza
- Muneez
- Mariyam Waheedha as Shaany
- Ali Azim as Fazil

== Episodes ==
No.	Title	Directed by	Original release date
1	"Episode 1"	Ali Seezan	April 14, 2022
Newly married Ayya and Azu head to Ayya's home island of ADh. Fenfushi to clear their heads. After completing her studies from Malaysia, Manal visits her aunt's island of ADh. Maamigili for a holiday.
2	"Episode 2"	Ali Seezan	April 22, 2022
Ayya and his friends go on a fishing trip and stop at ADh. Maamigili where he meets Manal after ten years of their first encounter. After a brief conversation, Ayya leaves to Fenfushi.
3	"Episode 3"	Ali Seezan	April 28, 2022
Ayya travels back to Maamigili to speak to Manal, hoping to reunite with her. However, she refuses to build friendship with Ayya and requests him to leave her alone. In the flashback, Ayya and Azu experience marital issues. Shamin, son of a family friends, stays at their house to complete a course.
4	"Episode 4"	Ali Seezan	May 6, 2022
Manal struggles to forgive her cheating boyfriend and decides to spend time with Ayya. Ayya's father confronts him regarding his challenging relationship with Azu. In the flashback, Ayya suspects that Azu is having an extramarital affair.
5	"Episode 5"	Ali Seezan	May 13, 2022
Manal has a change of heart and invite Ayya to teach her to swim. In the flashback, Azu attempts to reconcile with Ayya though his stubborn heart refuses to clear their misunderstanding. Ayya contemplates the fate of his marriage.
6	"Episode 6"	Ali Seezan	May 20, 2022
Ayya and Manal shares their past history and bond over their frequent meetings. In the flashback, Ayya further speculates about her affair with her colleague, Fazil, making things worse in their relationship.
7	"Episode 7"	Ali Seezan	May 27, 2022
Manal is romantically attracted to Ayya, but determines not be a homewrecker. Manal convinces her friend, Sham, to make her first move on her crush. Manal, finally confident of her swimming skills, goes to snorkeling with Ayya.
8	"Episode 8"	Ali Seezan	June 2, 2022
People start gossiping about Ayya's relationship with Manal. Meanwhile, Ayya keeps sidelining his responsibilities as a husband towards Azu which further deteriorates their fragile relationship.
9	"Episode 9"	Ali Seezan	June 9, 2022
Ayya sends a legal notice to Azu for divorce. Shamin tries his best but fails to clear their misunderstanding.
10	"Episode 10"	Ali Seezan	June 16, 2022
Ayya and Manal starts spending more time together and gets intimate. In the flashback, Fazil insists on helping Azu to clear Ayya's doubt, which she declines as it would be a futile attempt.
11	"Episode 11"	Ali Seezan	June 23, 2022
After sleeping with Ayya, Manal starts avoiding him and decides to remain strictly as friends. Manal's harsh words plunged a spear in his chest. Feeling betrayed, Ayya cuts his hair and moves back to Male'. On his way home, he meets with an accident.
12	"Episode 12"	Ali Seezan	June 30, 2022
Azu nurses him all day long and Ayya finally realizes the true value of her.
13	"Episode 13"	Ali Seezan	July 7, 2022
Azu disapproves Fazil visiting her. Ayya eavesdrops their conversation and realizes how faithful and strong Azu is. Azu almost give up on their relationship.
14	"Episode 14"	Ali Seezan	July 14, 2022
Ayya repents and reunites with Azu.
15	"Episode 15"	Ali Seezan	July 21, 2022
Manal returns to Male' and makes a surprise visit to Ayya's house.

== Development ==
Filming for the series commenced on 21 October 2021 and was scheduled for completion within one month. It was primarily shot in ADh. Fenfushi and ADh. Maamigili. Filming was slightly delayed due to the bad weather, though pre-production was completed in December 2021.

== Soundtrack ==
Track listing
No.	Title	Length
1.	"Raalhuthah"

== Release and reception ==
The first episode of the series was made available for streaming through digital streaming platform Medianet Multi Screen on 14 April 2022. The series received mixed reviews from critics.
