= Randhari =

- Official film poster
- Directed by: Mohamed Aboobakuru
- Screenplay by: Mohamed Aboobakuru
- Story by: Hussain Rasheed
- Produced by: Hussain Rasheed
- Starring: Ahmed Nimal; Fathimath Azifa; Ali Azim; Ibrahim Jihad
- Cinematography: Mohamed Aboobakuru
- Edited by: Mohamed Aboobakuru
- Music by: Ayyuman Shareef
- Production company: Fariva Films
- Release date: February 26, 2015
- Country: Maldives
- Language: Dhivehi

Randhari is a 2015 Maldivian film directed by Mohamed Aboobakuru and starring Ahmed Nimal, Fathimath Azifa and Ali Azim. It was produced by Hussain Rasheed under Fariva Films. The film was released on 26 February 2015.

== Cast ==
- Ahmed Nimal as Razzaq
- Fathimath Azifa as Aisha
- Ali Azim as Shahidh
- Ibrahim Jihad as Waseem
- Arifa Ibrahim as Mariyam
- Mohamed Waheed Waseem's father
- Aminath Muhusina
- Mohamed Najah as Policeman
- Fathimath Mufliha

== Soundtrack ==
No.	Title	Lyrics	Music	Singer(s)	Length
1.	"Loaiybeh Vevidhaane Hey"	Hussain Rasheed		Hassan Sobir	3:35
2.	"Dharifulhu Dhoonya"	Hussain Rasheed	Hussain Sobah	Hassan Sobir	4:35
3.	"Oagaatheri Hithakun"	Hussain Rasheed		Hassan Sobir	4:29
4.	"Dhunfini Thereyga"	Ibrahim Didi	Ibrahim Didi	Hassan Ilham	4:29
Total length:					12:39

== Release and response ==
The film premiered on 26 February 2015 at Olympus. It performed below average at the box office and was digitally released on 25 May 2015.
