= Gellunu Furaana =

Maldivian TV series

- Genre: Romantic horror drama
- Screenplay by: Yoosuf Shafeeu
- Directed by: Yoosuf Shafeeu
- Starring: Ali Azim; Irufana Ibrahim; Ali Shahid; Aminath Ziyadha
- Country of origin: Maldives
- Original language: Divehi
- No. of seasons: 1
- No. of episodes: 5

Production
- Producer: VMedia
- Cinematography: Ibrahim Moosa
- Running time: 22 minutes

Original release
- Network: VTV
- Release: 7 May – 4 June 2019

Gellunu Furaana is a Maldivian romantic horror drama television series developed for VMedia by Yoosuf Shafeeu. The series stars Ali Azim, Irufana Ibrahim, Ali Shahid and Aminath Ziyadha in pivotal roles. The first episode of the series was released on VTV on 7 May 2019. Filming for the series took place in B. Dharavandhoo.

== Premise ==
Munthasir Ali Azim, visits his best-friend, Rashid, at B. Dharavandhoo during his semester break and he is continuously met with a strange girl (Irufana Ibrahim) who leads him with suspicious questions for Rashid.

== Cast and characters ==
- Ali Azim as Munthasir
- Irufana Ibrahim as Haifa
- Ali Shahid as Jaleel
- Aminath Ziyadha as Shaaira
- Lubna as Zeeniya
- Hussain Nasif as Rashid
- Aminath Fazla
- Jauza Jaufar

== Soundtrack ==
Track listing
No.	Title	Lyrics	Singer(s)	Length
1.	"Gellunu Furaana"	Ibrahim Husaamin	Mohamed Humainee

== Release ==
The first episode among the five episodes was released on 7 May 2019, on the occasion of 1440 Ramadan. A new episode was released on Tuesday at 23:30 of every week.
