= Hiy Kalaayah Edheythee =

Maldivian web series

- Written by: Ahmed Nafiu
- Screenplay by: Mohamed Aboobakuru
- Directed by: Mohamed Aboobakuru
- Music by: Ayyuman Shareef
- Country of origin: Maldives
- Original language: Divehi
- No. of seasons: 1
- No. of episodes: 13

Production
- Producer: ME Productions
- Cinematography: Mohamed Aboobakuru
- Editor: Mohamed Aboobakuru
- Production company: ME Productions

Original release
- Release: March 28 – June 6, 2023

Hiy Kalaayah Edheythee is a Maldivian romantic famil drama web series directed by Mohamed Aboobakuru. It stars Ali Usam, Mariyam Sana and Mohamed Emau in main roles. The first episode of the series was released on 28 March 2023. The series follows a love triangle between Fazna, her boss, Shahid and boyfriend, Mahid. As Fazna pursues a new relationship with Shahid, her mother's growing obsession with him leads to dangerous consequences.

== Cast and characters ==
=== Main ===
- Ali Usam as Mahid
- Mariyam Sana as Fazna
- Mohamed Emau as Mohamed Shahid
- Aminath Shaana as Sheryn
- Mariyam Shafaza as Mariyam
- Ismail Zahir as Nazim

=== Recurring ===
- Ali Farooq as Ziyadh; Shahid's father
- Aishath Aarifa as Rasheedha; Mariyam's friend
- Aminath Muhusiana as Sheryn's mother
- Ali Shazleem as Najih
- Ahmed Abaan as Mujoo
- Abdullah Naseer as Alibe
- Aishath Ashla as Sana
- Mohamed Lisham as Siraj
- Naira

== Episodes ==
No.	Title	Directed by	Original release date
1	"Episode 1"	Mohamed Aboobakuru	March 28, 2023
Mahid, a middle class mechanic, in a relationship with a college student, Fazna, insists marrying her as soon as she graduates, which she rebuffs as too early. Even though Mahid loves Fazna unconditionally, she finds him off-putting for being over affectionate. Mahid's friends tease him for his unrequited love and class difference, though he trusts Fazna with his life. Fazna applies for a job and is selected for the post as a personal secretary to Shahid, the son of company's owner.
2	"Episode 2"	Mohamed Aboobakuru	March 28, 2023
Fazna meets her boss, Shahid, and is instantly attracted to him while he shares similar affections towards her. After the working hours, Shahid and Fazna bond at restaurants and they declare their love and affection towards each other with no hesitations. Fazna's friend, Sheryn, tries to knock some sense into her head, though Fazna refuses to believe her. Fazna's colleagues gossip about their affair.
3	"Episode 3"	Mohamed Aboobakuru	April 4, 2023
Mahid is disturbed to see Fazna with Shahid and feels replaced while Fazna claims Mahid is after her for very long. Sympathizing for his condition, Fazna's friend, Sheryn reveals to him that Fazna is in a relationship with Shahid. Shahid narrates the past of his long lost love whom he immensely loved four years ago and how she disappeared from his life.
4	"Episode 4"	Mohamed Aboobakuru	April 9, 2023
Sheryn confides in Mahid, revealing that she had experienced a past love for a man who subsequently enters into a relationship with one of her friends. The identities of the individuals within these narratives remain undisclosed. Shahid openly expresses to his father his current romantic involvement with Fazna, receiving immediate and unequivocal approval from his father.
5	"Episode 5"	Mohamed Aboobakuru	April 13, 2023
Sheryn musters the courage to confide in Mahid and disclosing that her affection is directed towards Mahid himself. However, her revelation is met with swift rejection from Mahid. Meanwhile, Fazna introduces Shahid to her family during which, a subtle shift is observed in the demeanor of Fazna's mother, Mariyam, as she regards Shahid in a manner that suggests a certain unconventional perspective.
6	"Episode 6"	Mohamed Aboobakuru	April 19, 2023
Mariyam encourages Shahid to visit their home frequently, aiming for him to become more acquainted with the family before their upcoming marriage. Unbeknownst to Shahid, Mariyam finds him attractive and hopes for more interactions. The couple decides to postpone their wedding by two months, and at Mariyam and Fazna's insistence, Shahid stays with them in their home while Fazna is away. This provides Mariyam with additional chances to engage in playful flirting.
7	"Episode 7"	Mohamed Aboobakuru	April 25, 2023
Sheryn unexpectedly encounters Shahid and is overwhelmed by guilt as she recalls the feelings he once had for her, which she didn't reciprocate over four years ago. Meanwhile, Mariyam becomes increasingly bold in her efforts to engage Shahid, displaying more openness in their interactions. In a desperate move, Mariyam takes an extreme step by seeking the help of a sorcerer, Alibe to win Shahid's affection.
8	"Episode 8"	Mohamed Aboobakuru	May 2, 2023
Shahid continues his previous romantic affair with Sheryn. She further states to Fazna that she is in a romantic relationship with a Shahid, unbeknownst to each other, its the same person. Simultaneously, Mariyam follows instructions from Alibe and her efforts yield positive results. As a consequence, Shahid begins to distance himself from Fazna, redirecting his attention towards Mariyam.
9	"Episode 9"	Mohamed Aboobakuru	May 10, 2023
Mahid witnesses Shahid's interactions with Mariyam and subsequently confides in Sheryn. In a joint decision, they opt to keep their morally questionable affair hidden from Fazna. Meanwhile, during work hours, Mariyam persistently arranges meetings with Shahid at her residence.
10	"Episode 10"	Mohamed Aboobakuru	May 17, 2023
Fazna unexpectedly discovers her mother and boyfriend in a compromising situation, leading to a confrontation. In an unconventional move, Mariyam becomes more transparent, aiming for a divorce from Nazim to pursue Shahid. As doubts increase, Fazna catches her mother tampering with Shahid's drinks, prompting her to initiate a deeper investigation.
11	"Episode 11"	Mohamed Aboobakuru	May 27, 2023
Nazim witnesses an unsettling sight of Mariyam and Shahid together on a bed, leading to an immediate divorce. Mahid and Sheryn's reunion takes place, while Fazna begins to contemplate her feelings for Mahid. Just before Shahid can introduce Mariyam to his father, he discovers their inappropriate relationship, igniting his determination to end things between them.
12	"Episode 12"	Mohamed Aboobakuru	May 30, 2023
Shahid's father expresses strong disapproval of their relationship. A breakthrough occurs when Mariyam's friend, Rasheedha, unveils a crucial detail: Mariyam had previously questioned her about Alibe. In a bid to mend the situation, Fazna turns to Alibe for assistance to rectify things. Rasheedha and Fazna with the help of Ziyadh follow Alibe's instructions.
13	"Episode 13"	Mohamed Aboobakuru	June 6, 2023
The curse is finally broken. Shahid grapples with guilt over his decisions and craves Fazna's affection and love, while Mariyam is plagued by shame for her malicious deeds. Fazna takes the initiative and proposes to Mahid, yet he opts for Sheryn instead. Meanwhile, Shahid makes an effort to rebuild Fazna's trust, but she declines a reconciliation. In a forgiving gesture, both Nazim and Fazna pardon Mariyam, though Nazim remains firm in his decision not to reconcile with her.

== Soundtrack ==
Track listing
No.	Title	Lyrics	Music	Singer(s)	Length
1.	"Hiy Kalaayah Edheythee"	Ahmed Nafiu	Hussain Sobah	Aminath Raya Ashraf, Hussain Sobah

== Release and reception ==
The first episode of the series was released on 28 March 2023 through MediaNet Video Club. The series received mixed to negative response from critics citing the poor performance of the actors and mediocre screenplay.
