= Loabi Vevijje =

Maldivian romantic film

- Official film poster
- Directed by: Ali Seezan
- Screenplay by: Ahmed Zareer
- Produced by: Ali Shaniz Mohamed; Aminath Shanaaz
- Starring: Ahmed Nimal; Ali Seezan; Mariyam Azza; Aminath Rishfa
- Cinematography: Ibrahim Moosa
- Edited by: Ali Seezan
- Music by: Fathuhulla Shakeel Hussain
- Production companies: S Production; Saturn Studio
- Release date: 3 May 2023
- Running time: 153 minutes
- Country: Maldives
- Language: Dhivehi

Loabi Vevijje is a 2023 Maldivian romantic film directed by Ali Seezan. Produced by Shaniz Ali and Aminath Shanaaz under S Production, the film stars Ahmed Nimal, Ali Seezan, Aminath Rishfa, Mariyam Azza, Ahmed Easa, Ali Azim and Irufana Ibrahim in pivotal roles. The film centers on a man who ends up becoming obsessed with a woman he has a one-night stand with. The film was released on 3 May 2023.

== Plot ==
The film follows a middle-aged man, Tholal (Ali Seezan) who lives an ordinary life with his devoted wife, Hasna (Mariyam Azza) and their kid. Frustrated with the violent behavior of Hasna's younger brother, Haseeb (Ali Azim), Tholal agrees on a pleasure trip to Sri Lanka offered by his friend, Maajidh (Ahmed Easa), who has been secretly in love with Hasna. During this one week trip, Tholal meets a wealthy woman, Maasha (Aminath Rishfa) with whom he has an extramarital affair. After the trip, his obsession with Maasha threatens to uproot his marriage and everyday life.

== Cast ==
- Ali Seezan as Tholal
- Mariyam Azza as Hasna
- Ahmed Easa as Maajidh
- Aminath Rishfa as Maasha
- Ali Azim as Haseeb
- Aminath Nisha
- Ahmed Nimal as Jaufar
- Abdullah Shafiu Ibrahim as Hassan
- Irufana Ibrahim as Fazee
- Yala Shaniz Ali
- Naufal Naseem
- Mohamed Akthar as a police officer
- Mohamed Manik (special appearance)
- Washiya Mohamed (special appearance)
- Khadheeja Ibrahim Didi (special appearance)
- Ibrahim Zaid Ali as Tholal's friend (special appearance)

== Development ==
During the shooting of the film, Andhirikan (2020), on 26 September 2019, director Seezan announced the title of his upcoming film as Loabi Vevijje. Pre-production of the film, including finalizing the script, songs recording and mixing was proceeded during the next two months. The film was officially launched on 11 December 2019. Filming commenced on 24 December 2019 in GDh. Thinadhoo and continued till 8 January 2020. Apart from Thinadhoo, some scenes of the film were shot in Sri Lanka during March 2020. Filming was halted due to the COVID-19 pandemic, with two scenes pending to be shot in Male'. In May 2022, it was reported that Aishath Rishmy was roped in to direct some songs of the film. With the indication of cinema re-opening, post COVID-19, the crew resumed the shoot of the remaining scenes of the film, including the songs in GDh. Thinadhoo.

== Soundtrack ==
The first single of the film "Miss Veyey", a bonus song of the film's soundtrack album, performed by Abdul Hannan Moosa Didi after a long hiatus, was released on 14 February 2021, on the occasion of Valentines Day.

Track listing
No.	Title	Lyrics	Music	Singer(s)	Length
1.	"Miss Veyey"	Easa Shareef	Abdul Hannan Moosa Didi	Abdul Hannan Moosa Didi	03:32
2.	"Thiya Ummeedhu"	Mohamed Abdul Ghanee	Ibrahim Nifar	Mumthaz Moosa, Mariyam Ashfa	05:11
3.	"Thiya Loaiybaanulaa"	Mohamed Abdul Ghanee	Hassan Jalaal	Hassan Jalaal	04:40
4.	"Mi Jismugaa"	Ismail Mubarik		Ahmed Ibrahim	03:50
5.	"Heelumey Hiyy Furey" (Version 1)	Mohamed Abdul Ghanee	Ibrahim Nifar	Aleef Ali, Rafiyath Rameeza	05:37
6.	"Heelumey Hiyy Furey" (Version 2)	Mohamed Abdul Ghanee	Ibrahim Nifar	Mohamed Abdul Ghanee, Mariyam Ashfa	05:37
7.	"Gunamun Midhaa"	Mohamed Abdul Ghanee	Ibrahim Zaid Ali	Ibrahim Zaid Ali, Mariyam Nafha	03:41
8.	"Udhuhilan"		Mohamed Muazzin Naeem	Mohamed Muazzin Naeem	03:42
9.	"Udhuhilan" (Radio Version)		Mohamed Muazzin Naeem	Mohamed Muazzin Naeem	04:01
10.	"Loabi Vevijje" (Promo Song)	Mohamed Abdul Ghanee	Ibrahim Zaid Ali	Abdullah Shafiu Ibrahim, Ali Seezan, Ahmed Nimal, Ahmed Easa, Ali Azim, Mariyam Azza, Aminath Rishfa, Irufana Ibrahim	03:54
Total length:					39:53

== Release ==
The film was scheduled for theatrical release for mid-2020, but was postponed due to the COVID-19 pandemic. In January 2023, makers of the film announced that Loabi Vevijje will be released in theatres on 3 May 2023, as the second Maldivian film to be screened at Olympus Cinema, after its re-opening in February 2023.

The film received generally positive reviews from critics. Ahmed Nadheem from Dhauru while highlighting the cinematography by Ibrahim Moosa as the strongest pillar of the film wrote: "The opening teaser and the last scene in the rain is one of the few scenes no one would imagine to witness in Maldivian cinema". Further applauding the acting performance of Ali Azim, Nadheem commended the creative team for taking a risk to present an "erotic thriller". Despite that, he criticized the screenplay for its "abrupt sequencing" and "inconsistent character development", weak dialogue dubbing and the "average" performance by the lead cast except for Azim. Aminath Luba reviewing from The Press praised the cinematography of the film and acting of Ali Azim as the best offerings from the film, while pointing out some flaws in the editing and inclusion of too many songs "distracting".

== Accolades ==
Award	Category	Recipients	Result	Ref.
1st MSPA Film Awards	Best Supporting Actor – Male	Ali Azim	Nominated	
