= Leena (film) =

2019 Maldivian thriller film

- Official film poster
- Directed by: Abdulla Muaz
- Written by: Ahmed Zareer
- Produced by: Abdulla Muaz; Sayyah Abbas
- Starring: Mariyam Azza; Abdulla Muaz; Ali Azim; Nuzuhath Shuaib; Zeenath Abbas; Ahmed Saaed; Mariyam Haleem
- Cinematography: Ibrahim Wisan
- Edited by: Abdulla Muaz
- Music by: Fathuhulla Shakeel
- Production companies: Abdulla Muaz Productions; Baiskoafu
- Release date: July 23, 2019
- Running time: 121 minutes
- Country: Maldives
- Language: Dhivehi

Leena is a 2019 Maldivian thriller film directed by Abdulla Muaz. Co-produced by Muaz and Sayyah Abbas under Abdulla Muaz Productions in association with Baiskoaf, the film stars Mariyam Azza, Muaz, Ali Azim, Nuzuhath Shuaib, Zeenath Abbas, Ahmed Saaed and Mariyam Haleem in pivotal roles.

The film is based on the murder of Azleena Nafees who was found dead in a bathroom with multiple stab wounds at the Chamber of Commerce. Working as a secretary at that place, Nafees was killed on 5 April 2001 by Abdullah Zuhair, who was serving as a security guard in the office of the Haveeru News Services, which is next to the Chamber of Commerce.

== Premise ==
Leena (Mariyam Azza), a dedicated young woman working at island's council, awaits a confirmation for her application of a medical scholarship. Persuaded by her colleague and friend, Faathun (Nuzuhath Shuaib), Leena begins a romantic relationship with an IT technician, Huzam (Ali Azim). In the meantime, Satthar (Ahmed Saeed), the corrupted chief of island council schemes a plan to misuse the government money for personal gain with the help of Zuhoor (Abdulla Muaz), the security guard of island council. In need of money to abort his girlfriend, Sama's (Zeenath Abbas) child, Zuhoor agrees to execute the plan. Leena's dreams are shattered when she gets meddled in their plan.

== Cast ==
- Mariyam Azza as Aminath Leena
- Ali Azim as Huzam
- Nuzuhath Shuaib as Faathun
- Zeenath Abbas as Sama, Zuhoor's girlfriend
- Abdulla Muaz as Ali Zuhoor
- Ahmed Saeed as Satthar, Island Council chief
- Ahmed Easa as Faaiz
- Mohamed Rishfan as Razzaq
- Ahmed Nimal as Khalid, Zuhoor's abusive father
- Amira Ismail as Zuhoor's mother
- Mariyam Haleem as Leena's mother
- Ibrahim Wisan as Zuhoor's friend

== Development ==
On 20 July 2016, it was announced that director Abdulla Muaz projects to release the film Leena as a five episodes television drama series broadcast through Channel 13. Filming was speculated to begin 2016 in an island of either Shaviyani Atoll or Kaafu Atoll, the filming was commenced on 25 January 2018 in Aa. Ukulhas and was completed on 27 February 2018.

Fathimath Azifa was first offered to play the title character in the film but she opted out due to her prior commitments. At the time reports speculated that Ahmed Azmeel will be portraying the role of the murderer though later Muaz confirmed that he is planning to "launch a new face" to the industry with this character. On 23 January 2018 it was revealed that Mariyam Azza will be portraying the titular character, while Ali Azim was roped in to play Leena's boyfriend, Nuzuhath Shuaib was cast as her best friend and Mariyam Haleem will be seen as her mother. Zuhair's character was renamed to Zuhoor and Zeenath Abbas was confirmed to play his lover while Ahmed Saeed will represent the island council. On 25 January 2018, Muaz cleared the rumors and confirmed that the role of murderer will be portrayed by himself.

On 18 December 2017, the film landed in a controversy when Azleena's family objected to produce a film based on the incident of her suffering; "We do not want people to witness what she went through. We do not want any other person imitating to be her". Director Muaz replied to the statement as "consent need not be attained when a film is being made on a story that is being apparently inspired from a real incidence. As mentioned earlier, there wont be any objectifying scenes included in the film". As the producers began ticket sale for the film, a group of friends from Azleena's family continued to protest on social media against the film, calling to boycott it. Muaz reacted to the wave of criticism and replied; "From day one, it has been mentioned that the film is an inspiration and not a biography. A plot is developed based on an inspiration derived from an event. So is the case of Leena, never it has been presented as a biographical movie based on a particular individual".

== Soundtrack ==
The promotional song "Neyvaalaa Hindhu" was released on 15 July 2019.

Track listing
No.	Title	Lyrics	Music	Singer(s)	Length
1.	"Neyvaalaa Hindhu"	Mohamed Abdul Ghanee	Ibrahim Zaid Ali	Hassan Tholaq, Aminath Lamha Latheef
2.	"Mee Ishq Hey"	Mohamed Abdul Ghanee	Munaz Zubair	Abdulla Muaz

== Release ==
The film was initially planned to release in mid-2018 though they pushed the release date to the following year citing the political instability in the country in relation to 2018 Maldivian presidential election. The director, later announced that the release date to be 20 April 2019 but speculations arise that the release date will be further moved considering the delay in its post-production. A teaser trailer of the film along with the poster was released on 3 February 2019. The film was then scheduled to release on 23 July 2019.
