= Avahteriya =

Maldivian web series

- Genre: Comedy drama
- Written by: Yoosuf Shafeeu
- Screenplay by: Yoosuf Shafeeu
- Directed by: Yoosuf Shafeeu
- Country of origin: Maldives
- Original language: Divehi
- No. of seasons: 1
- No. of episodes: 26

Production
- Producers: Yoosuf Shafeeu; Ismail Shafeeq
- Cinematography: Shivaz Abdulla
- Editor: Yoosuf Shafeeu
- Production company: Eupe Production

Original release
- Release: April 13, 2021

Avahteriya is Maldivian comedy drama web series written and directed by Yoosuf Shafeeu. It stars Ali Azim, Ibrahim Jihad, Ahmed Azmeel, Ahmed Easa, Ansham Mohamed, Aminath Noora, Ahmed Ziya and Ali Usam in main roles. The pilot episode of the series was released on 13 April 2021.

== Cast and characters ==
- Ali Azim as Ibrahim Solih
- Ibrahim Jihad as Dr. Algeen
- Ahmed Azmeel as Jabir
- Ahmed Easa as Raqeeb
- Ansham Mohamed as Fiyaza
- Aminath Noora as Mareena
- Ahmed Ziya as Lucky
- Ali Usam as Raseen

== Episodes ==
No. overall	No. in season	Title	Directed by	Original release date
1	1	"Episode 1"	Yoosuf Shafeeu	April 13, 2021
Mareena (Aminath Noora) is a modest girl who speaks only in her native language, while her husband, Jabir (Ahmed Azmeel) constantly tries to convert her into a modern girl. Meanwhile, Solih (Ali Azim) an ordinary looking middle-aged who is ruled by his strict, modern wife, Fiyaza (Ansham Mohamed), consults a psychologist, Dr. Algeen (Ibrahim Jihad), seeking to help him in counselling his harsh wife.
2	2	"Episode 2"	Yoosuf Shafeeu	April 20, 2021
Jabir continues his session with Algeen hoping to convert his wife into a modern woman. When Fiyaza was robbed on road, Mareena takes her to her home, only to attract Jabir for the latter's fashion sense while Solih is charmed by Mareena's modesty. Another client, Raseem (Ali Usam) starts consulting Algeen.
3	3	"Episode 3"	Yoosuf Shafeeu	April 27, 2021
In order to spice things up and make more money from the situation, Algeen along with his assistant, Raqeeb (Ahmed Easa) decided to mingle their customers and involve them in futile circumstances. Jabir's excessively anxious and growing relationship with Fiyaza strikes a warning on Solih.
4	4	"Episode 4"	Yoosuf Shafeeu	May 4, 2021
Electrified, Jabir comes home to see Solih in his apartment. Seeing his condition, Solih suspects Jabir visiting his house in his absence, he covers it up as a makeup for a horror film. The two friends talk about their situation as why they sought help from Dr. Algeen, where they praise the wives of the other. Meanwhile, Raseem is terrified of the latest incidents.
5	5	"Episode 5"	Yoosuf Shafeeu	May 11, 2021
Dr. Algeen along with Qalib and Lucky evaluate and analyze their findings, situation and mutual relationship between Raseen, Solih and Jabir. Taking the opportunity, they formulate a masterplan to create the most disputes between them and gain the potential advantages.
6	6	"Episode 6"	Yoosuf Shafeeu	May 18, 2021
Fiyaza visits Dr. Algeen hoping he would give an opportunity for her modelling career. As she gives him a false impression of being an industrious wife, Dr. Algeen's trick works and make her believes that she is possessed by his Jinn.
7	7	"Episode 7"	Yoosuf Shafeeu	May 25, 2021
The two couples meet and they get cleared of all suspicions and misunderstandings. Raseen visits two sorcerers–Dr. Algeen and Raqeeb in disguise–and is realized that the girl in his dream is Solih's wife, Fiyaza.
8	8	"Episode 8"	Yoosuf Shafeeu	June 1, 2021
Raseen is convinced Fiyaza is his dream girl and his curse-breaker, though Lucky reveals that he personally knows her and her husband, Solih, who is willing to break things off with Fiyaza. Raseen meets her and is assured that Raseen is the Jinn whom she evaded recently but Lucky overrides her thoughts saying Raseen is an operator of a modelling agency.
9	9	"Episode 9"	Yoosuf Shafeeu	June 8, 2021
Raseen and Lucky stage a scene to ensure that Raseen can stay at Fiyaza's apartment for over two days in order to get closer with her.

== Development ==
The series was developed on the working title "Thedhey An'bin Reechey" which was later changed to "Avahteriya". The pilot episode was released before completion of filming for the whole project. Soon after, the government imposed a lockdown due to COVID-19 pandemic which further delayed pre-production since majority of the scenes were scheduled to be shot in Hulhumale'.

== Release and reception ==
The series was made available for streaming through Baiskoafu application during Ramadan 1442. The pilot episode of the series was released on 13 April 2021, to positive reviews from critics. Ahmed Hameed Adam reviewing from Avas was generally in favor of the film and noted Jihad and Easa's performances as the highlights of film "As an experienced actor, Jihad has delivered an outstanding performance with a different taste".
