= Huvaa =

Maldivian romantic drama web series

- Genre: Romantic drama
- Created by: Fathimath Nahula
- Written by: Fathimath Nahula
- Screenplay by: Fathimath Nahula
- Directed by: Fathimath Nahula; Mohamed Faisal (season 1); Yoosuf Shafeeu (season 2)
- Starring: Yoosuf Shafeeu; Sheela Najeeb; Mohamed Faisal; Aminath Rishfa; Ravee Farooq; Abdulla Muaz; Mariyam Azza; Ibrahim Jihad; Ali Azim; Arifa Ibrahim; Roanu Hassan Manik; Ahmed Azmeel
- Music by: Fathhulla Shakeel Hussain
- No. of seasons: 2
- No. of episodes: 102

Production
- Producer: Baiskoafu
- Cinematography: Ibrahim Moosa
- Editors: Mohamed Faisal; Yoosuf Shafeeu; Ravee Farooq
- Running time: 10–15 minutes
- Production company: Crystal Entertainment

Original release
- Network: Baiskoafu
- Release: 29 November 2018 – present

Huvaa is a Maldivian romantic drama web television series developed for Baiskoafu by Fathimath Nahula. It revolves around a large family and the impact of an incident that turns their lives upside down and turns their happiness into revenge and discord. The series was released on 29 November 2018.

Huvaa stars Yoosuf Shafeeu, Sheela Najeeb, Mohamed Faisal, Aminath Rishfa, Ravee Farooq, Mariyam Azza, Ahmed Azmeel, Ibrahim Jihad, Arifa Ibrahim, Ali Azim, Roanu Hassan Manik, Mariyam Shakeela, Ahmed Easa, Irufana Ibrahim, Mariyam Haleem, and Jadhulla Ismail. The first season was co-directed by Mohamed Faisal and the second by Yoosuf Shafeeu. Abdulla Muaz replaced Ravee Farooq in the second season.

== Synopsis ==
=== Season 1 ===
Hassan and Maariya are a cheerful and wealthy couple who live with their four children, Nazim, Hanim, Azim, Ganim, as well as Hanim's wife, Sheeza. Nazim heads the family business and notices that its accountant, Jihad, is involved in a financial scam. In order to avert the threat to his interests, Jihad assigns a group of thugs to murder Nazim. Hanim unintentionally gets involved in the assault and is killed by the thugs, interrupting the family's peace. Meanwhile, Azim is romantically attracted to a married woman, Minha, who is domestically abused by her drunk husband, Mauroof. After their third divorce, Mauroof manipulates Minha to consummate a marriage with Azim, only to remarry him after the divorce.

In an interrogation session with Jihad, Nazim learns that he is adopted. This leads him on a search for his biological mother, Khadheeja, who reveals that she was a poor orphan who had to hand over her baby to Hassan and Maariya after she was raped by an intruder. While visiting Khadheeja, Nazim bumps into Shauna, a pretty young woman who was initially in a relationship with his cousin, Akmal, a womanizer. The youngest of the family, Ghanim, initiates a romantic affair with Shaha, the girlfriend of Munthasir, one of the thugs involved in Hanim's murder.

Nazim encounters his biological father, Fuad, and narrowly escapes from a death trap, which leads the latter to poison himself in the process. The family welcomes Shauna and Shaha, causing Akmal to become distressed. He befriends Shaha, and together, they conspire against the family, each with their own personal vendetta. From threatening Shauna to plotting against Nazim and Sheeza, they succeed in splintering the household. Azim eventually puts the puzzle pieces together, and he manages to prove that Akmal intends to eliminate Nazim from the family business and Shaha plans to save Munthasir from the death penalty.

=== Season 2 ===
Hoping to avoid trouble with Zoya, a mentally unstable woman, Nazim reveals that she is his half-sister, only for her to find out later that she is actually a result of an extramarital affair by her mother. Akmal blackmails Shauna with explicit photos and videos of their previous affair, and Mauroof seeks the help of a black magic practitioner in order to destroy Minha and Azim's relationship.

== Cast and characters ==
=== Main ===
- Mohamed Faisal as Ahmed Nazim Hassan
- Aminath Rishfa as Shauna
- Sheela Najeeb as Sheeza
- Yoosuf Shafeeu as Hanim
- Ravee Farooq as Azim (season 1)
- Abdulla Muaz as Azim (season 2)
- Mariyam Azza as Minha
- Ahmed Azmeel as Mausoom (season 2)
- Ibrahim Jihad as Akmal
- Arifa Ibrahim as Maariya
- Roanu Hassan Manik as Hassan
- Ali Azim as Ganim
- Irufana Ibrahim as Saha
- Ahmed Easa as Mauroof
- Mariyam Shakeela as Zubeydha
- Mohamed Waheed as Zareer
- Aminath Rasheedha as Zoya's mother (season 2)
- Mariyam Haleem as Khadheeja
- Huneysa Adam as Mariyam (season 1)
- Jadhulla Ismail as Manik (season 1)
- Nashidha Mohamed as Zoya

=== Recurring ===
- Mohamed Azim Abdul Haadi as Fuad Umar
- Abdullah Shafiu Ibrahim as Munthasir
- Ali Farooq (season 2)
- Hamdhoon Farooq as Shaheem
- Ali Shazleem as Ali Jihad
- Mohamed Rifshan as Mahmood
- Ali Nadheeh as Hameem

== Production ==
=== Development ===
In February 2018, Fathimath Nahula announced that her upcoming project, titled Huvaa, was being developed as the first Maldivian web series. Filming of the first schedule took place on Guraidhoo on 26 February 2018, before halting for Ramazan. On 16 March 2018, Nahula invited musicians to compose songs for the series. Filming for the second schedule took place in Male' and Villimale' and was completed on 31 July 2018. On 7 October 2018, it was revealed that the show would be released on the streaming service Baiskoafu, which would launch in November 2018. Serving as the producer of the show, Baiskoafu's team built the set for the series. After the twentieth episode of the second season, the crew announced a break, citing difficulties during the COVID-19 pandemic.

=== Casting ===
It was revealed that a total of over 40 actors would appear in the series, including newcomers and established actors. On 26 February 2018, Nahula announced that Aminath Rishfa, Ibrahim Jihad, Ali Azim, and Sheela Najeeb would feature in the series. On 14 March 2018, reports revealed that Mariyam Azza and Yoosuf Shafeeu had joined the cast, along with Jadhulla Ismail and Mohamed Faisal. Faisal and Shafeeu were also confirmed to work as directors of several episodes, alongside Nahula. On 17 May 2018, Nahula confirmed that Ravee Farooq was cast as Azim in the series. In an interview regarding the cast, Nahula said: "There will lot of strong characters in the film, and each actor will play a leading role in the series. Specific details are intended to bring out a balanced arc from each character and not to be missed in the huge cast".

== Soundtrack ==
Season 1
No.	Title	Lyrics	Music	Singer(s)	Length
1.	"Karunaya Veyna"	Adam Haleem Adnan	Ibrahim Zaid Ali	Ibrahim Zaid Ali	4:20
2.	"Mi Vaagothey"	Mausoom Shakir	House of Music	Shalabee Ibrahim, Mariyam Ashfa

Season 2
No.	Title	Lyrics	Music	Singer(s)	Length
1.	"Handhakee Kalaa"			Umar Zahir	3:06
2.	"Hiy Mi Edhey"	Mohamed Abdul Ghanee	Ibrahim Nifar	Ibrahim Zaid Ali, Mariyam Ashfa	3:00

== Release ==
The series was initially planned for an April 2018 release, though this ended up being postponed. A trailer was released on 13 November 2018, during the launch ceremony for the Baiskoafu application. On the same night, the team announced that the series would premiere on 29 November 2018. The pilot episode was viewed by more than 16,000 people.
