= Dhauvath =

- Official film poster
- Directed by: Yoosuf Shafeeu
- Written by: Yoosuf Shafeeu
- Screenplay by: Yoosuf Shafeeu
- Produced by: V Media
- Starring: Mariyam Azza; Ali Azim; Ahmed Easa
- Cinematography: Ibrahim Moosa
- Edited by: Yoosuf Shafeeu
- Music by: Abdul Basith
- Production company: Eupe Productions
- Distributed by: Olympus
- Release date: 12 June 2019
- Country: Maldives
- Language: Dhivehi

Dhauvath (transl. Invitation) is a 2019 Maldivian horror film written and directed by Yoosuf Shafeeu. Produced by V Media, the film stars Mariyam Azza, Ali Azim and Ahmed Easa in pivotal roles. The film based on true incidents occurred in an island in Maldives, follows a happily married couple who goes on a honeymoon trip and the downfall of their relationship and lives due to black-magic.

== Premise ==
A newly wedded couple, Razeen (Ali Azim) and Zeeniya (Mariyam Azza) go on their 7-days honeymoon trip. There they meet Saajidh (Ahmed Easa), the housekeeping staff of the guesthouse, who practices black-magic while also taking care of a paralyzed woman, Nadhira (Aminath Ziyadha). Soon after, Zeeniya experiences paranormal events.

== Cast ==
- Ali Azim as Razeen
- Mariyam Azza as Zeeniya
- Ahmed Easa as Saajidh
- Mohamed Faisal as Majdhee
- Aminath Ziyadha as Nadhira

== Development ==
The project was announced on 5 September 2018 in an event held to celebrate V Media's tenth anniversary. Declaring Dhauvath as their first commitment if film production, the first look of the film was announced in the same ceremony along with a cast of Ali Azim, Nuzuhath Shuaib and Irufan Ibrahim. However, later, reports revealed that the film will star Mariyam Azza, Azim and Ahmed Easa in the lead roles. Filming was completed in December 2018 in B. Dharavandhoo.

== Soundtrack ==
Track listing
No.	Title	Lyrics	Music	Singer(s)	Length
1.	"Funn Handhaan"	Ibrahim Hussan	Munaz Zubair	Umar Zahir
2.	"Dhekeyhiy Vaavarun"	Mohamed Zaheen	Ayyuman Shareef	Umar Zahir	4:35

== Release and reception ==
The teaser trailer of the film was released on 1 March 2019. The film was released on 12 June 2019. The film released mixed reviews from critics. Mariyam Waheedha from Miadhu Daily wrote: "The director succeeds in exploring the witchcraft and black magic while perfectly conveying the moral message to audience and extracting the most from the actors. Had it include some remedies or ways to prevent from black magic spells, the film can win extra hearts". Ifraz Ali from Dho? chose the film among the worst five films released during the year while pointing out its resemblance with Turkey's Sijjin film series.

== Accolades ==
Award	Category	Recipient(s) and nominee(s)	Result	Ref(s)
1st MSPA Film Awards	Best Negative Role	Ahmed Easa	Nominated	
1st MSPA Film Awards	Best Choreography	Yoosuf Shafeeu	Nominated	
1st MSPA Film Awards	Best Visual Effects	Mohamed Usham	Nominated	
1st MSPA Film Awards	Best Sound Engineer	Abdul Basith	Won	
1st MSPA Film Awards	Background Score	Abdul Basith	Nominated	
