= Hanaa (web series) =

Maldivian web series

- Screenplay by: Aminath Rinaza
- Story by: Aminath Rinaza
- Directed by: Amjad Ibrahim
- Starring: Ali Azim; Aminath Noora; Ibrahim Jihad; Ali Shameel
- Music by: Ayyuman Shareef
- Country of origin: Maldives
- Original language: Dhivehi
- No. of seasons: 1
- No. of episodes: 13

Production
- Producers: Aishath Kainaa Hussain Munawwar; Ahmed Kiyaan Hussain Munawwar; Kayaan Hussain Munawwar
- Cinematography: Hussain Munawwar
- Editor: Ali Rasheed
- Production company: Kid Production

Original release
- Release: February 27 – May 15, 2020

Hanaa is a Maldivian web series directed by Amjad Ibrahim and distributed by Basikoafu. Produced by Kid Productions, the series stars Ali Azim, Aminath Noora, Ibrahim Jihad and Ali Shameel in pivotal roles.

== Cast ==
=== Main ===
- Ali Azim as Yanaal
- Aminath Noora as Hanaa
- Ibrahim Jihad as Rizaan
- Ali Shameel as Hameed; Yanaal's father
- Qulishthaan Mohamed as Nahidha; Yanaal's mother
- Fathimath Latheefa as Fareedha; Hanaa's mother
- Aminath Nisha as Samaa

=== Recurring ===
- Reehan Riyaz as Abaan
- Gamariyya Gasim as Mareena

=== Guest ===
- Mariyam Ali
- Ali Aashiru
- Mohamed Wildhan
- Mariyam Afaa
- Evaan Ismail
- Mohamed Ibrahim

== Episodes ==
No. in season	Title	Directed by	Original release date
1	"Episode 1"	Amjad Ibrahim	February 27, 2020
After completing his Master's Degree in Tourism, Yanaal (Ali Azim) returns to his island and joins his father's firm. Yanaal falls in love with a middle class family daughter, Hanaa (Aminath Noora).
2	"Episode 2"	Amjad Ibrahim	March 3, 2020
Hanaa's childhood best friend, Rizaan (Ibrahim Jihad) is dejected on hearing that Hanaa is dating Yanaal.
3	"Episode 3"	Amjad Ibrahim	March 7, 2020
Hanaa gets a job as a front officer in a guest house. Her best friend, Samaa (Aminath Nisha) starts preparing for her marriage.
4	"Episode 4"	Amjad Ibrahim	March 13, 2020
Rizaan continues to stay positive in his life. However, he becomes downhearted on seeing Hanaa and Yanaal together.
5	"Episode 5"	Amjad Ibrahim	March 20, 2020
Hanaa's mother, Fareedha (Fathimath Latheefa) disapproves her relationship with Yanaal, citing the difference in their social status.
6	"Episode 6"	Amjad Ibrahim	March 27, 2020
Hanaa breaks up with Yanaal without giving him any explanation. Yanaal discovers that Hanaa is working at his father’s guest house. Despite several efforts, Hanaa decides to take Yanaal only as a friend. Yanaal seeks help from his parents to convince her mother.
7	"Episode 7"	Amjad Ibrahim	April 3, 2020
The plan succeeds with their marriage being fixed for the coming week. The news hits Rizaan’s life as a storm.
8	"Episode 8"	Amjad Ibrahim	April 10, 2020
Hanaa’s life takes an unexpected turn with Yanaal’s mother, Nahidha’s (Qulishthaan Mohamed) impertinent behavior towards her.
9	"Episode 9"	Amjad Ibrahim	April 17, 2020
The news of Hanaa's pregnancy brings the whole family together. She gives birth to a healthy boy.
10	"Episode 10"	Amjad Ibrahim	April 24, 2020
When everything was working in favor of Hanaa, her patience is tested with the demise of her mother.
11	"Episode 11"	Amjad Ibrahim	April 30, 2020
12	"Episode 12"	Amjad Ibrahim	May 8, 2020
13	"Episode 13"	Amjad Ibrahim	May 15, 2020

== Development ==
The plot of the series was developed by director Amjad Ibrahim. Producer Hussain Munawwar assigned screenwriter Aishath Rinaza, to write a thirteen episodes drama series based on a love-triangle. Filming for the series commenced on 15 October 2019 in ADh. Maamigili and was completed within fifteen days. Dubbing and editing of the series was simultaneously completed on location. Composition of back music of the series was completed in late December 2020.

== Soundtrack ==
Track listing
No.	Title	Lyrics	Music	Singer(s)	Length
1.	"Hiyy Dhevijjey" (Originally from the soundtrack of Niuma)	Adam Haleem Adnan	Ibrahim Zaid Ali	Ibrahim Zaid Ali, Aishath Maain Rasheed	4:01

== Release and reception ==
The series was initially planned to be released in November 2019. However, with regards to the delay in back music, the series was pushed for a 2020 release. A teaser trailer of the series was released on 12 February 2020. On 15 February 2020, it was revealed that the series will be made available for streaming through Basikoafu on 27 February 2020.

On release, the film received mixed to negative reviews from critics. Ahmed Jaishan from Sun called the film an "outdated melodrama, re-created from the 90s”. Praising the chemistry and the "eternal love" of the parents, Hameed and Nahidha, Jaishan is pleased with the acting performance of Azim and Jihad though he noted that Noora is "camera unfriendly and shy" in most scenes.
