= Huvaa Kohfa Bunan =

Maldivian web series

- Genre: Romantic comedy drama
- Screenplay by: Yoosuf Shafeeu
- Directed by: Yoosuf Shafeeu
- Music by: Ayyuman Shareef
- Country of origin: Maldives
- Original language: Divehi
- No. of seasons: 3
- No. of episodes: 78

Production
- Producers: Yoosuf Shafeeu; Ushamath Ismail; Ali Rasheed
- Cinematography: Ali Rasheed
- Editors: Yoosuf Shafeeu; Ali Rasheed
- Production company: Eupe Production

Original release
- Release: 27 December 2020

Huvaa Kohfa Bunan is Maldivian romantic comedy drama web series written and directed by Yoosuf Shafeeu. The series stars Ali Azim, Abdullah Shafiu Ibrahim, Ahmed Easa, Mariyam Shifa, Nathasha Jaleel, Washiya Mohamed and Irufana Ibrahim in pivotal roles. The pilot episode of the first season of the series was released on 27 December 2020.

== Plot ==
=== Season 1 ===
Maaish (Ali Azim) and Dhaain (Abdullah Shafiu Ibrahim) are two cunning and manipulative friends who con others for their own benefits. When they are forcefully evicted by their tenant for evading rent for fifteen months, the two compete for residency at Jamsheed's (Ahmed Saeed) place. Once their traits were exposed, they later manipulate Jamsheed, the die-hard fan of local film actress, Nashidha (Nashidha Mohamed), posing as friends of her. The duo were initially attracted to the short-tempered woman, Haifa (Mariyam Shifa), the girlfriend of an aspiring politician, Naushad (Ahmed Easa). As Naushad and Haifa's relationship ends citing their difference of opinions, Maaish and Dhaain challenge to win the love of Naushad's young sister, Zara (Washiya Mohamed), mostly due to her prosperity and wealth. Meanwhile, Zara's abusive boyfriend, Javid (Mohamed Faisal) is revealed to be a mole working for Naushad's rival, Arushad (Ali Usam) who is competing for the same seat at People's Majlis.

== Cast and characters ==
- Ahmed Saeed as Jamsheed "Jaanu"
- Nashidha Mohamed as Nashidha
- Ali Azim as Maaish
- Ahmed Easa as Naushad
- Mohamed Faisal as Javid
- Abdullah Shafiu Ibrahim as Dhaain
- Mariyam Shifa as Haifa
- Washiya Mohamed as Zara
- Ahmed Azmeel as Assad
- Irufana Ibrahim as Airin
- Rashad Mohamed as Razzaq
- Ali Usam as Arushad
- Aminath Noora as Reesha
- Ibrahim Jihad as Ajuvadh
- Nathasha Jaleel as Shaaira
- Musthafa Hakeem as Juman
- Ali Yooshau as Nuzair

== Development ==
The series was announced in mid-2020. Filming for the series took place in Hulhumale' in July 2020. It was developed as a three-season project, each consisting of 26 episodes. Post production of the series was initiated in late August 2020, scheduling to release the first episode in September 2020.

== Soundtrack ==
Track listing
No.	Title	Music	Singer(s)	Length
1.	"Veyneh Yageene Mee Ishq Ishq"	Ibrahim Zaid Ali	Mohamed Abdul Ghanee
2.	"Aavee Loabeegaa"

== Release and reception ==
The trailer of the series was released on 11 October 2020. The series was made available for streaming through Baiskoafu on 27 December 2020. The pilot episode of the series was met with positive response from critics, where Ahmed Rasheed from MuniAvas highlighted the comical elements included in the series.
