= Giridha =

Maldivian web series

- Genre: Comedy drama
- Written by: Yoosuf Shafeeu
- Screenplay by: Yoosuf Shafeeu
- Directed by: Yoosuf Shafeeu
- Music by: Ayyuman Shareef
- Country of origin: Maldives
- Original language: Divehi
- No. of seasons: 1
- No. of episodes: 15

Production
- Producers: Yoosuf Shafeeu; Ismail Shafeeq
- Cinematography: Shivaz Abdulla
- Editor: Yoosuf Shafeeu
- Production company: Eupe Production

Original release
- Release: September 7 – December 14, 2021

Giridha is Maldivian comedy drama web series written and directed by Yoosuf Shafeeu. It stars Ibrahim Jihad, Ali Azim and Ali Usam in main roles. The film follows three friends who move to Male' in hopes of finding work and struggle to pay their rent. They befriend their leaser and plan on following their lifelong dream of working in the film industry. The pilot episode of the series was released on 7 September 2021.

== Cast and characters ==
=== Main ===
- Ibrahim Jihad as Ibrahim Jinah
- Ali Azim as Ayaaz
- Ali Usam as Mafaaz

=== Recurring ===
- Aminath Noora as Madam Fathun
- Shima as Rosemeen
- Ahmed Ziya as Rameez
- Mohamed Afrah as Zumarrath

=== Guest ===
- Ansham Mohamed as Rozy (Episode 4)
- Shana as Rozaina (Episode 7)
- Shifana as Roziana (Episode 8)
- Ahmed Easa as Vasanti (Episode 11)
- Mohamed Faisal as Director Sibzaud (Episode 13)
- Hussain Shibau as Boogle Master (Episode 15)

== Episodes ==
No.	Title	Directed by	Original release date
1	"Episode 1"	Yoosuf Shafeeu	September 7, 2021
Three tenants, aspiring actor Ayaaz (Ali Azim), screenwriter Mafaaz (Ali Usam) and director Rameez (Ahmed Ziya) inspired to breakthrough into the movie production industry explores the dynamics of script writing, directing and acting. They attempt to cunningly on board the landlord, Jinah (Ibrahim Jihad) as the investor.
2	"Episode 2"	Yoosuf Shafeeu	September 14, 2021
With the financial support from Jinah, the three tenants along with the landlord, discusses whom to be roped in to play the lead actress and the genre of the film.
3	"Episode 3"	Yoosuf Shafeeu	September 21, 2021
Madam Faathun (Aminath Noora) seeks help from Jinah to get away from a blackmailer. Jinah, having a very hard time saying no to madam, attempts to convince the very excited tenants to give away the investment money received for their project.
4	"Episode 4"	Yoosuf Shafeeu	September 28, 2021
Jinah runs into Rosemeen who advises him not to spend the money on anything else other than the planned movie production. Jinah and others meet a delightful Rozy.
5	"Episode 5"	Yoosuf Shafeeu	October 5, 2021
Jina wakes up to find that money is missing. Everyone is stressed out and tries their best to find the money. Rosemeen visits to check the status of the project during a hectic situation.
6	"Episode 6"	Yoosuf Shafeeu	October 12, 2021
Rozemeen links Jina with an acquaintance to get a location for script development. Some occurrences at this paranormal place and Mafaz's script are alike. They meet an aspiring actress Rozy in an interesting turn of events.
7	"Episode 7"	Yoosuf Shafeeu	October 19, 2021
Rozaina's acting is astonishing and leaves everyone puzzled. Ayaz stealthily follow Jinah to discover a secret Mafaz and Jinah had kept from him. They meet an interesting character in a plot twist.
8	"Episode 8"	Yoosuf Shafeeu	October 26, 2021
The landlord shows his disapproval to having too many people being accommodated at his premises. Jinah's kind gesture leads to all of them experiencing paranormal activities.
9	"Episode 9"	Yoosuf Shafeeu	November 2, 2021
Ayaz, Mafaz and Jinah tries to straighten out a previous incident. Mafaz hints and idea to Jinah that helps to elucidate the issue, with assistance from Fathun mandam. They experience another psychic event.
10	"Episode 10"	Yoosuf Shafeeu	November 9, 2021
Ayaaz, Mafaz and Jinah attempts to solve the mystery behind the supernatural incidents. They further explore to identify Fathun madam's blackmailer.
11	"Episode 11"	Yoosuf Shafeeu	November 16, 2021
Ayaz, Mafaz and Jinah solve the mystery of blackmail. They uncover a surprising relationship between Madam Fathun and the blackmailer.
12	"Episode 12"	Yoosuf Shafeeu	November 23, 2021
Even after the setbacks, Madam assists Jinah, Ayaz and Mafaz in continuing with the movie project. Confusions occurs when they meet another director in the process.
13	"Episode 13"	Yoosuf Shafeeu	November 30, 2021
Jinah, Ayaz and Mafaz decide to meet the director. The director tries to show his capabilities and talents to convince them to take him as a director.
14	"Episode 14"	Yoosuf Shafeeu	December 7, 2021
They start to witness some unusual activities. They see scary things and after than one morning, they can find their hero Ayaz.
15	"Episode 15"	Yoosuf Shafeeu	December 14, 2021
After returning madam Fathun's money back to her Jinah and Mafaz decide to find Ayaz with the help of boogle master.

== Development ==
After the project was put in halt for several months, director Yoosuf Shafeeu resumed shooting of the film, following the positive feedback from Multi Screen. The series was developed as a mix of sitcom comedy and casual comedy. The project was re-announced on 7 August 2021, with several actors from Shafeeu's previous directorial venture, Avahteriyaa (2021).

== Release and reception ==
The pilot episode of the series was made available for streaming on Baiskoafu on 7 September 2021, to positive reviews from critics.
