= Dark Rain Shorts =

- Opening title scene
- Production company: Dark Rain Entertainment
- Distributed by: YouTube
- Release dates: 1 October 2020 (Dhauvathu); 14 October 2020 (Anguru)
- Country: Maldives
- Language: Dhivehi

Dark Rain Shorts are a series of Maldivian suspense thriller films produced by Dark Rain Entertainment. They released their first short film titled Dhauvathu on 1 October 2020. The project developed to encourage and support the hard working artists of Maldives during economically uncertain times with regard to COVID-19 pandemic.

== List of productions ==
Title	Release date	Director(s)	Producer(s)	Writer(s)	runtime	Ref(s)
Dhauvathu	1 October 2020	Ali Shifau	Aishath Fuwad Thaufeeq, Mohamed Ali	Ali Shifau	11 minutes	
Anguru	14 October 2020	Ali Shifau	Aishath Fuwad Thaufeeq, Mohamed Ali	Ali Shifau	8 minutes	

== Premises ==
=== Dhauvathu ===
Jina (Mohamed Hoodh) meets a stranger, Zoona (Mariyam Shifa) at the bus stop who invites him to her house. There he is introduced to Zoona's husband, Sunie (Ahmed Sunie) who reveals that Zoona died two years ago. Things take an unexpected turn when his prank goes wrong in the most horrified way.

=== Anguru ===
Aminath (Aminath Silna), a victim of a sexual assault becomes mentally disturbed. Her father, Manik (Roanu Hassan Manik) desperately seeks assistance from the authorities to identify the rapist but sees no hope. One day, Aminath recognizes him on the street. In the process of self-administered justice and revenge, Manik makes a grave mistake which he never saw coming.

== Cast and characters ==
Dhauvathu

- Ahmed Sunie as Sunie
- Mariyam Shifa as Zoona / Shifu
- Hoodh Ibrahim as Jina

Anguru

- Roanu Hassan Manik as Manik
- Aminath Silna as Aminath
- Fathimath Zuhair
- Ahmed Faiz
- Ibrahim Shiyaz
- Mohamed Mahil
- Afsar Mridha

== Reception ==
The first release from the Dark Rain Short was well received by the critics and noted the sharp and intrigued writing for bringing the required twists and thrills.
