= Aminath Noora =

Maldivian actress

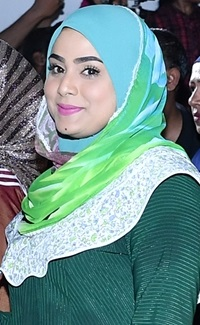
- Noora at Independence Day Float Parade, 2019
- Born: 11 February 1986 (age 40); S. Feydhoo
- Citizenship: Maldives
- Occupation: Actress
- Years active: 2004–present

Aminath Noora (born 11 February 1986) is a Maldivian actress.

== Career ==
In 2004, Noora made her screen debut with a video single directed by Mohamed Niyaz and rendered by Fazeela Amir. Titled "Jaadhooga Jeheyney", the song topped several charts and was a hit, resulting in another video collaboration with Niyaz. Titled "Visnaa Visnaa", the song marks the first Maldivian single aired through MTV (India).

Noora made her film debut with a Dark Rain Entertainment production, the Ali Shifau-directed romantic comedy Vaashey Mashaa Ekee (2016) opposite Mohamed Jumayyil and Mariyam Majudha narrating the life of a happily married couple being separated due to the husband's crippling fear of commitment on his wife's pregnancy. Her performance as a responsible mother and a caring friend fetched her a nomination as the Best Female Debut at the 8th Gaumee Film Awards ceremony.

In 2017, Noora featured in the Ali Shifau-directed romantic comedy Mee Loaybakee alongside Mohamed Jumayyil and Mariyam Azza. The film, which is considered to include the largest cast in a Maldivian feature film, narrates the story of two ex-lovers sliding into the friend zone with the envy and diffidence they experience amidst a convoluted love-triangle. The film and her performance received mainly positive reviews from critics where Aishath Maaha of Avas called her acting to be "good overall". The film emerged as one of the highest grossing Maldivian films of 2017.

== Filmography ==
=== Feature film ===
Year	Title	Role	Notes	Ref(s)
2016	Vaashey Mashaa Ekee	Inaya	Nominated—Gaumee Film Award for Best Female Debut	
2017	Mee Loaybakee	Shazu		
2023	Beeveema	Faathun		
2023	November	Farisha		
2024	Roboman: The Movie	Sham		
2026	Gilan	Airin		
2026	Magey Bituge Wedding †		Post production	

=== Television ===
Year	Title	Role	Notes	Ref(s)
2016	Bithufangi	Rozy		
2020	Hanaa	Hanaa	Main role; 13 episodes	
2021	Huvaa Kohfa Bunan	Reesha	Recurring role	
2021	Rumi á Jannat	Haadhy's wife	Recurring role; 3 episodes	
2021	Avahteriya	Mareena	Main role; 9 episodes	
2021	Giridha	Madam Fathun	Recurring role; 7 episodes	
2022	Dhoadhi	Azeeza "Azu"	Main role; 15 episodes	
2024–2025	Raiha	Raiha	Main role; 12 episodes	
2026	Barudhaasthu	Minna	Main role	

=== Short film ===
Year	Title	Role	Notes	Ref(s)
2018	Ihaanaiy	Saleema	Office Drama	

== Accolades ==
Year	Award	Category	Nominated work	Result	Ref(s)
2017	8th Gaumee Film Awards	Best Female Debut	Vaashey Mashaa Ekee	Nominated	
