= Ibrahim Jihad =

Maldivian actor (born 1980)

- Born: 30 November 1980 (age 45); Fuvahmulah, Maldives
- Occupation: Actor
- Years active: 2004–present

Ibrahim Jihaad Shavee commonly known as Ibrahim Jihad (born 30 November 1980) is a Maldivian actor.

== Career ==
Abdul Faththaah's horror film Eynaa was released in 2004, which appears Sheela Najeeb, Mohamed Manik, Ahmed Shah, Khadheeja Ibrahim Didi, Jihad and Nashidha Mohamed as six colleagues who go on a picnic to a haunted uninhabited island and their battle for survival. The film garnered critical appreciation specially for its technical department and was a commercial success. The following year, Jihad reunited with Abdul Faththaah for his romantic disaster film, Hureemey Inthizaarugaa (2005) cast along with Ravee Farooq, Mariyam Zuhura, Waleedha Waleed and Neena Saleem. The film, heavily relied on the effect of the 2004 Indian Ocean earthquake on the Maldives, received favorable reviews from critics though it failed to perform financially. Jihad played the envious brother who is ready to go extreme extent to destroy's his brother's career and life.

In 2011, Jihad featured as the police officer Shavin in Yoosuf Shafeeu-directed action drama film Insaaf (2011). The film revolves around the disputes between two districts of an island. Upon release, the film received mixed to positive reviews from critics but it failed to be recognized financially. Mohamed Aboobakuru-directed Randhari was Jihad's only release of 2015. His portrayal of the character Waseem, along with the film received negative reviews from critics and did below average business at the box office. The following year, he played the role of Muju, a thief who gets trapped in a haunted house along with a group of friends, in Fathimath Nahula's horror film 4426. Upon release, the film received mostly positive reviews from critics. Ahmed Nadheem of Avas labelled the film as a "masterpiece" and noted his character to be the "catalyst" of the film. His character along with his performance was widely appreciated considering it to be "once in a lifetime" performance. With twenty-five back-to-back housefull shows being screened, 4426 was declared as the highest-grossing film of the year. At the 8th Gaumee Film Awards Jihad received a nomination for Best Actor award.

Jihad's only release of 2017 was Aishath Rishmy's romantic drama Bos. Penned and produced by Fathimath Nahula, the film tells the story of Ibaa (played by Mariyam Azza), a woman from a royal family and her battle with depression after the demise of her father. A reviewer from Avas criticise the film for having resemblance with American coming-of-age romantic drama A Walk to Remember (2002) and Indian romantic drama Sanam Teri Kasam (2016), however considered Jihad's performance and "perfect portrayal" of his character as the few things that saved the film from being a "snooze-fest". Though the film received mixed response from critics, it emerged as the highest grossing Maldivian film of 2017.

2018 was a dull year for Maldivian film-industry with regards to 2018 Maldivian presidential election, hence only one film of Jihad was released during the year; a suspense thriller film Dhevansoora (2018) written and directed by Yoosuf Shafeeu. The film marks Shafeeu's thirtieth direction and features an ensemble cast of twenty-one actors. Revolving around a murder investigating, Jihad played a police officer trying to solve the murder mystery. The film received positive reviews from critics and was considered a "norm-breaker" for the Maldivian cinema. Ahmed Hameed Adam reviewing from VNews applauded Jihad's performance as he maintained "vulnerability and ruthlessness in a stable manner while emoting for the grief of his lost-child in the perfect way". Ismail Nail Rasheed from Raajje.mv echoed similar sentiments towards his acting and wrote: "Jihad's character was faced with a formal yet personal conflict and he delivered the best expressions during each phase". He then starred in the first Maldivian web-series, a romantic drama by Fathimath Nahula, Huvaa. The series consisting of sixty episodes and streamed through the digital platform Baiskoafu, centers around a happy and radiant family which breaks into despairing pieces after a tragic incident that led to an unaccountable loss. The series and his performance as a spoiled carefree young man entrapped in a sin he was hoping to evade were positively received.

== Media image ==
In 2018, he was ranked in the seventh position from Dho?'s list of Top Ten Actor of Maldives.

== Filmography ==
=== Feature film ===
Year	Title	Role	Notes	Ref(s)
2004	Eynaa	Fasee		
2005	Hureemey Inthizaarugaa	Ubair		
2010	Dhin Veynuge Hithaamaigaa	Himself	Special appearance in the song "Annaashey Hinithun Velamaa"	
2011	Insaaf	Shavin		
2015	Randhari	Waseem		
2016	4426	Muju	Nominated—Gaumee Film Award for Best Actor	
2017	Bos	Maaish	Nominated—Gaumee Film Award for Best Supporting Actor	
2018	Dhevansoora	Ahmed Shiyad	Nominated—Gaumee Film Award for Best Supporting Actor	
2022	Hehes	Ziyadh		
2024	Lasviyas	Zahid		
2024	Saaya			
2024	Gellunu Rey			
2025	Ilzaam	Ibrahim Wajeeh	Special appearance	

=== Television ===
Year	Title	Role	Notes	Ref(s)
2004–2005	Loabi Nulibunas	Shuad	Recurring role; 2 episodes	
2005–2006	Kuramey Vadhaaee Salaam	Irufan	Main role; 13 episodes	
2006–2008	Hinithun Velaashey Kalaa	Adheel	Main role; 16 episodes	
2007	Aharenge Lha Daddy	Misbah		
2007	Kalaa Dheke Varah Loabivey	Nihan	Main role; 12 episodes	
2007	Vamey Kaireegaa Kalaa		Main role	
2009	Sirru Sirrun Kalaa	Naseem	Main role	
2009	Vakinuvaan Bunefaa Vaudheh Nuvanhey?	Nabeel	Main role; 13 episodes	
2011	Furaana Dheynan	Nahid	Main role; 4 episodes	
2012	Dhirumeh Nethas	Irufan	Main role; 5 episodes	
2015	Vakivumuge Kurin	Nihad	Main role; 14 episodes	
2018–2020	Huvaa	Akmal	Main role	
2019–2020	Haasaa	Rifau	Main role; 11 episodes	
2020	Hanaa	Rizan	Main role; 10 episodes	
2020–2021	Huvaa Kohfa Bunan	Ajuvadh	Main role	
2021	Avahteriya	Dr. Algeen	Main role; 9 episodes	
2021	Giridha	Ibrahim Jinah	Main role; 15 episodes	
2022	Vihaali	Muja	Main role in the segment "Rahmedhu"	
2022	Dharaka	Firushan	Main role; 8 episodes	
2022	Biruveri Vaahaka	Customer	Guest role; Episode: "Edhun"	
2022	Baby	Rashid	Main role; 3 episodes	
2022	Hissu	Zahir	Main role; 3 episodes	
2024	Ereahfahu	Ibrahim Wajeeh	Main role; 15 episodes	
2025	Loaiybahtakaa	Amru	Main role; 6 episodes	

=== Short film ===
Year	Title	Role	Notes	Ref(s)
2007	Badi Edhuru	Hussain Farish		
2008	Ummeedh	Afrah		
2009	Dhekunu Huvafen	Ayaz		
2014	Kashfu		Gaumee Film Award for Best Actor - Short film	

=== Other work ===
Year	Title	Director	Editor	Notes	Ref(s)
2018	24+7	Yes		Office drama	
2022	Bahdhal	Yes		Web series; 3 episodes	

== Accolades ==
Year	Award	Category	Nominated work	Result	Ref(s)
2017	8th Gaumee Film Awards	Best Actor	4426	Nominated	
2017	8th Gaumee Film Awards	Best Actor	Kashfu	Won	
2019	9th Gaumee Film Awards	Best Supporting Actor	Bos	Nominated	
2019	9th Gaumee Film Awards	Best Supporting Actor	Dhevansoora	Nominated	
