= Ahmed Easa =

Maldivian film actor (born 1985)

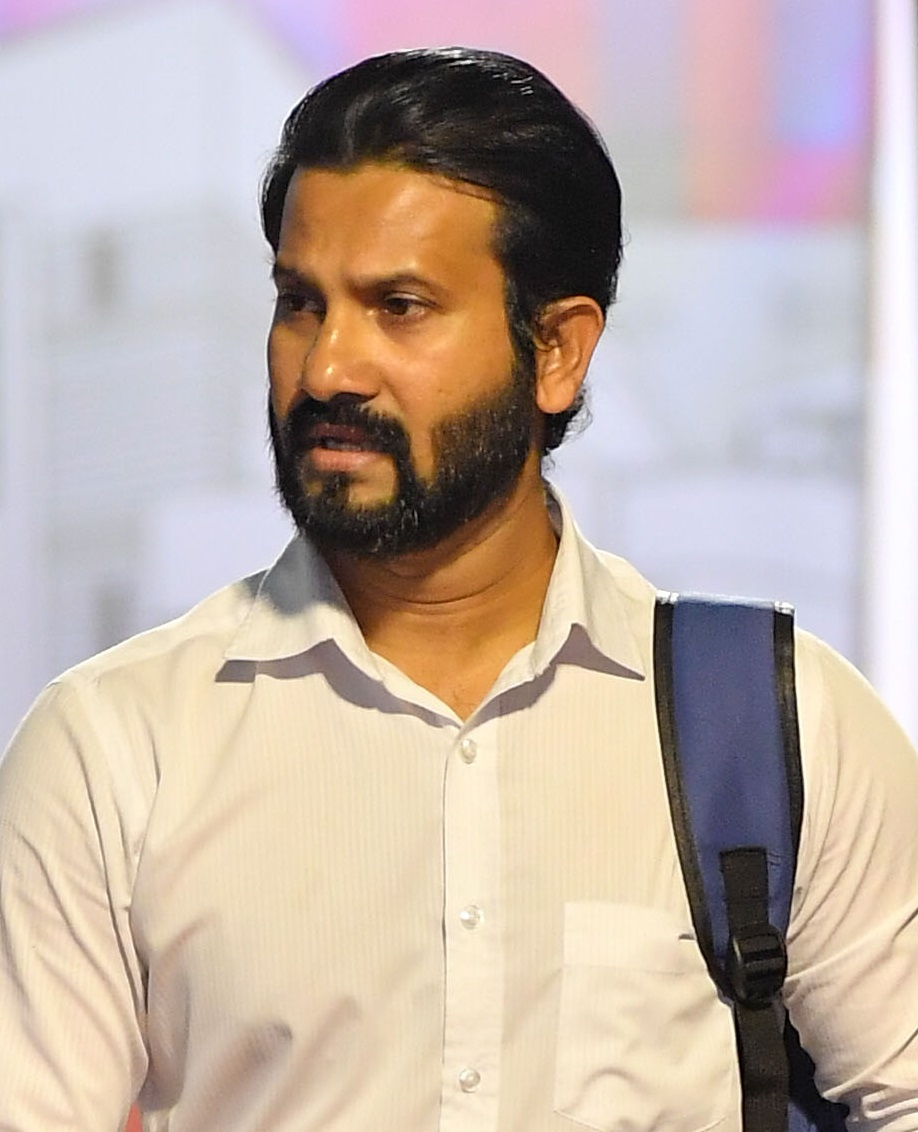
- Easa attending Olympus reopening ceremony, 2023
- Born: 7 October 1985 (age 41); Maakurathu, Raa Atoll, Maldives
- Occupation: Actor
- Years active: 2011–present

Ahmed Easa (born 7 October 1985) is a Maldivian film actor.

== Career ==
In his childhood, Ahmed Easa watched Bollywood films and imitated the acting of Sunil Shetty in stage performances. While watching his movies, Easa grew a fondness towards cinema and decided to pursue a career in acting "if granted with a chance worth holding for". He was first offered a role in Amjad Ibrahim's romantic horror film Udhabaani (2009) but he rejected it since he was "too shy to be in front of the camera with his current physique". However, he made his film debut two years later with Hamid Ali's Laelaa (2011) co-starring Yoosuf Shafeeu, Amira Ismail and Ali. The film revolves around two daughters who are forced into an arranged marriages by their parents. The film and his performance received a negative response from critics; "The newcomer is strictly average in his performance but he needs to be more confident in his moves and work on the dialogue delivery if needs to survive in the industry". The film was declared a flop at box office.

After shooting a video single with Yoosuf Shafeeu, Easa was asked to feature in his thirtieth direction Dhevansoora (2018), a suspense thriller film featuring an ensemble cast including Shafeeu, Mariyam Shifa, Ali Azim and Fathimath Azifa in pivotal roles. He initially shot for the role of a policeman, portrayed by Mohamed Faisal in the film, before Shafeeu suggested he switch to a "more complex" role since he was unable to find anyone "who fits the bill" for that role. Revolving around a murder investigating, Easa played a delivery boy who has been accused to be involved in the murder crime. The film received positive reviews from critics and was considered a "norm-breaker" for the Maldivian cinema. Ahmed Hameed Adam reviewing from VNews applauded Easa's performance while playing the "strong-headed man and the vulnerable attacker". He then starred in the first Maldivian web-series, a romantic drama by Fathimath Nahula, Huvaa. The series consisting of sixty episodes and streamed through the digital platform Baiskoafu, centers around a happy and radiant family which breaks into despairing pieces after a tragic incident that led to an unaccountable loss. The series and his performance as an irresponsible and lazy husband and a drug addict were positively received.

2019 was a successful year for Ease where he had multiple film releases. He first starred in Yoosuf Shafeeu's horror comedy film 40+ (2019), a sequel to 2017 released comedy film Naughty 40, which was well received both critically and commercially. Their next collaboration, Nafrathuvumun (2019) played alongside Shafeeu, Mariyam Azza and Ali Azim revolves around a guesthouse, the only source of income for a woman who is convinced by several men to sell the property. This was followed by another direction from Shafeeu, the romantic horror film Dhauvath (2019), which follows a happily married couple who goes on a honeymoon trip and the paranormal activities they experience due to black-magic. Mariyam Waheedha from Miadhu considers his portrayal of the character Saajid to be "surprisingly good".

In 2023, Easa played the role of a wicked and unscrupulous friend in Ali Seezan's erotic thriller Loabi Vevijje, which follows a married man who becomes infatuated with a woman after a one-night stand. The film which was announced in 2019, but halted due to COVID-19 pandemic, opened to generally positive reviews from critics, where as his performance received mixed reviews from critics. Aminath Luba reviewing from The Press found his performance to be "strictly average, nothing exceptional". Similarly, Ahmed Nadheem from Dhauru called his acting "not bad" and "generally okay".

== Filmography ==
Key
†	Denotes films that have not yet been released

=== Feature film ===
Year	Title	Role	Notes	Ref(s)
2011	Laelaa	Shivan		
2018	Dhevansoora	Wafir		
2019	Goh Raalhu	Husham's friend	Special appearance	
2019	40+	Saiman		
2019	Nafrathuvumun	Lamiu		
2019	Dhauvath	Sajidh		
2019	Leena	Faaiz		
2021	Faree	Sappe		
2023	Loabi Vevijje	Maajidh		
2023	Free Delivery	Ishaq	Special appearance	
2024	Lasviyas	Iqbal		
2024	Udhabaani 2	Lamiu		
2024	Bibii	Adhuham Satthar		
2025	Sorry	Ziyad		
2025	Kan'bulo	Ariz		
2026	Lamha	Malik		
2026	Dhevi		Special appearance	
2026	Majunoon	Maaniu		
2026	Dhaleyka †		Post production	

=== Television ===
Year	Title	Role	Notes	Ref(s)
2016	Bithufangi			
2018–2026	Huvaa	Mauroof	Main role; 61 episodes	
2019	Shhh	Himself	Special appearance; Episode 5	
2020	Karu Hakuru	Anand	Guest role; Episode: "Anand"	
2020–2021	Huvaa Kohfa Bunan	Naushad	Main role	
2021	Avahteriya	Raqeeb	Main role; 9 episodes	
2021	Hatharu Manzaru	Easa / Zaidh	Main role in the segments "Ruqyah", "Fulhi" and "Naama"	
2021	Loabi Vias	Mohamed Maakil	Main role; 8 episodes	
2021	Giridha	Vasanti	Guest role; "Episode 11"	
2022	Giritee Loabi	Doctor	Recurring role; 2 episodes	
2022	Shakuvaa	Adheel	Main role; 5 episodes	
2022	Dhoadhi	Ali Mohamed	Main role; 15 episodes	
2022	Bahdhal	Laamiu	Main role; 3 episodes	
2024	Yaaraa	Hudha's boyfriend	Guest role; "Episode 43 & 50"	
2025	Loaiybahtakaa	Mihad	Main role; 6 episodes	
2025	Chaalaakee			
2026	Barudhaasthu	Shihaab	Main role; 13 episodes	
2026	Ganaa			
2026	JunJulaa	Latheef		

== Discography ==
Year	Album/Film	Song	Lyricist(s)	Co-Artist(s)
2023	Loabi Vevijje	"Loabi Vevijje" (Promo song)	Mohamed Abdul Ghanee	Abdullah Shafiu Ibrahim, Ali Seezan, Ahmed Nimal, Ali Azim, Mariyam Azza, Aminath Rishfa, Irufana Ibrahim

== Accolades ==
Year	Award	Category	Nominated work	Result	Ref(s)
2025	1st MSPA Film Awards	Best Negative Role	Dhauvath	Nominated	
