= Dharavandhoo =

Island of the Maldives

Dharavandhoo ދަރަވަންދޫ
- Inhabited island
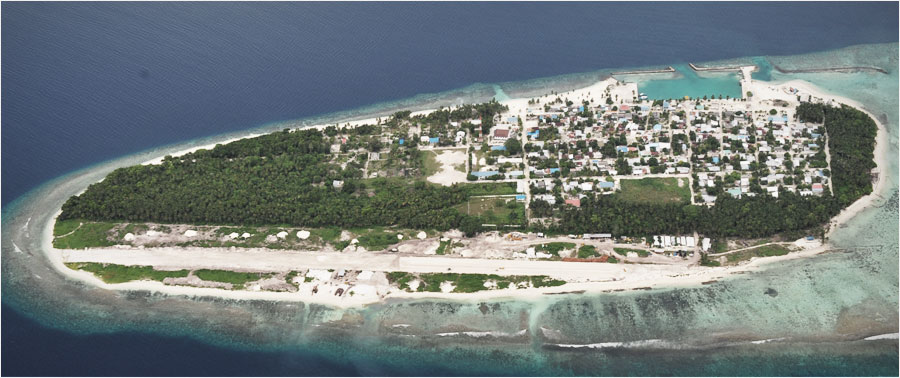
- Dharavandhoo Aerial View (Recent)

- Location in Maldives
- Coordinates: 05°09′30″N 73°07′50″E
- Country: Maldives
- Administrative atoll: Baa Atoll
- Distance to Malé: 116.53 km (72.41 mi)

Government
  - Body: Dharavandhoo Council
  - President: Ali Samih

Area
  - Total: 0.4550 km^{2} (0.1757 sq mi)

Dimensions
  - Length: 1.330 km (0.826 mi)
  - Width: 0.480 km (0.298 mi)

Population (2022)
  - Total: 997
  - Density: 2,190/km^{2} (5,680/sq mi)
- Time zone: UTC+05:00 (MST)

Dharavandhoo (Dhivehi: ދަރަވަންދޫ) is one of the inhabited islands of Baa Atoll.

== Geography ==
The island is 116.53 km (72 mi; 63 nmi) north of the country's capital, Malé.

=== Ecology ===
This island is surrounded by clear waters known as Dharavandhoo Thila and Hanifaru Bay; which are famous amongst divers around the world, for it is a sanctuary for a variety of marine life, including manta rays and whale sharks. This eco-life zone is now strictly protected by law.

== Demography ==
Historical population
| Year | Pop. | ±% |
|---|---|---|
| 2006 | 740 | — |
| 2014 | 744 | +0.5% |
| 2022 | 997 | +34.0% |
2006-2014-2022: Census populations Source:

== Governance ==
The island is administered by an Island Council consisting of five councillors elected by the people of the island.

== Transportation ==
Dharavandhoo Airport was opened on 17 October 2012. Inner harbour was first dredged by MTCC, in the last four months of 1997. There is also a breakwater jetty.

== Gallery ==
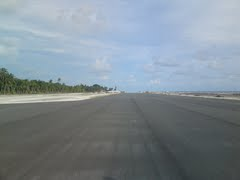
Dharavandhoo Airport runway, nearing completion

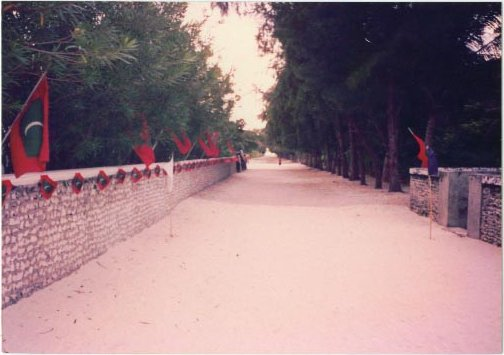
The Dharavandhoo main road, pictured in the 1990s from near Baa Atoll school

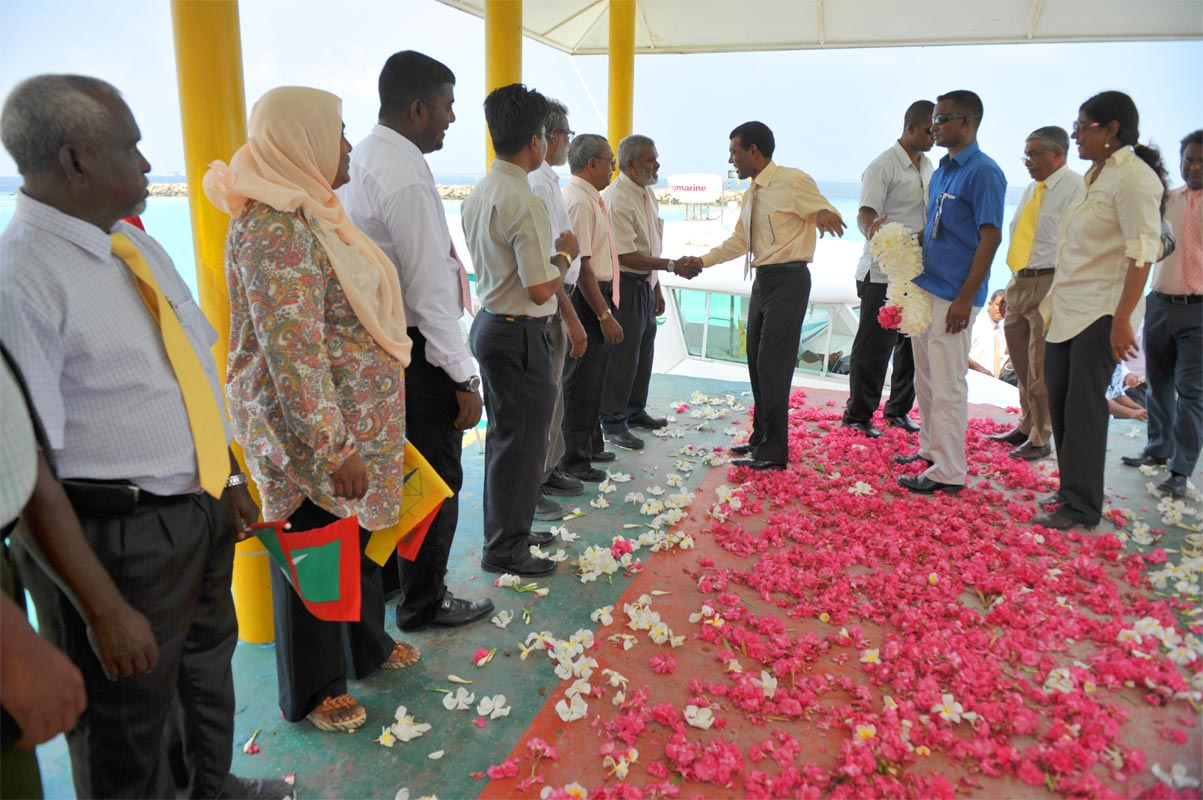
President of Maldives Mohamed Nasheed visits Dharavandhoo in 2010.

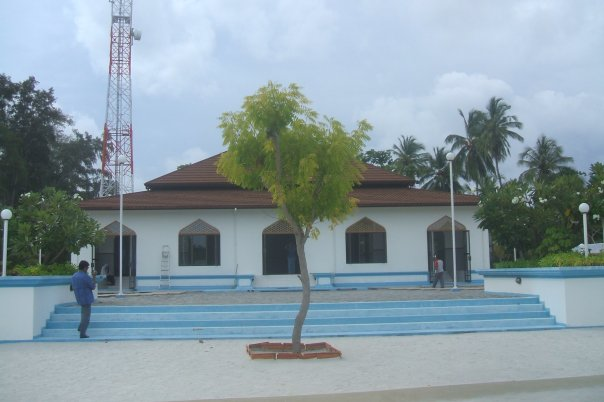
Dharavandhoo Friday Mosque

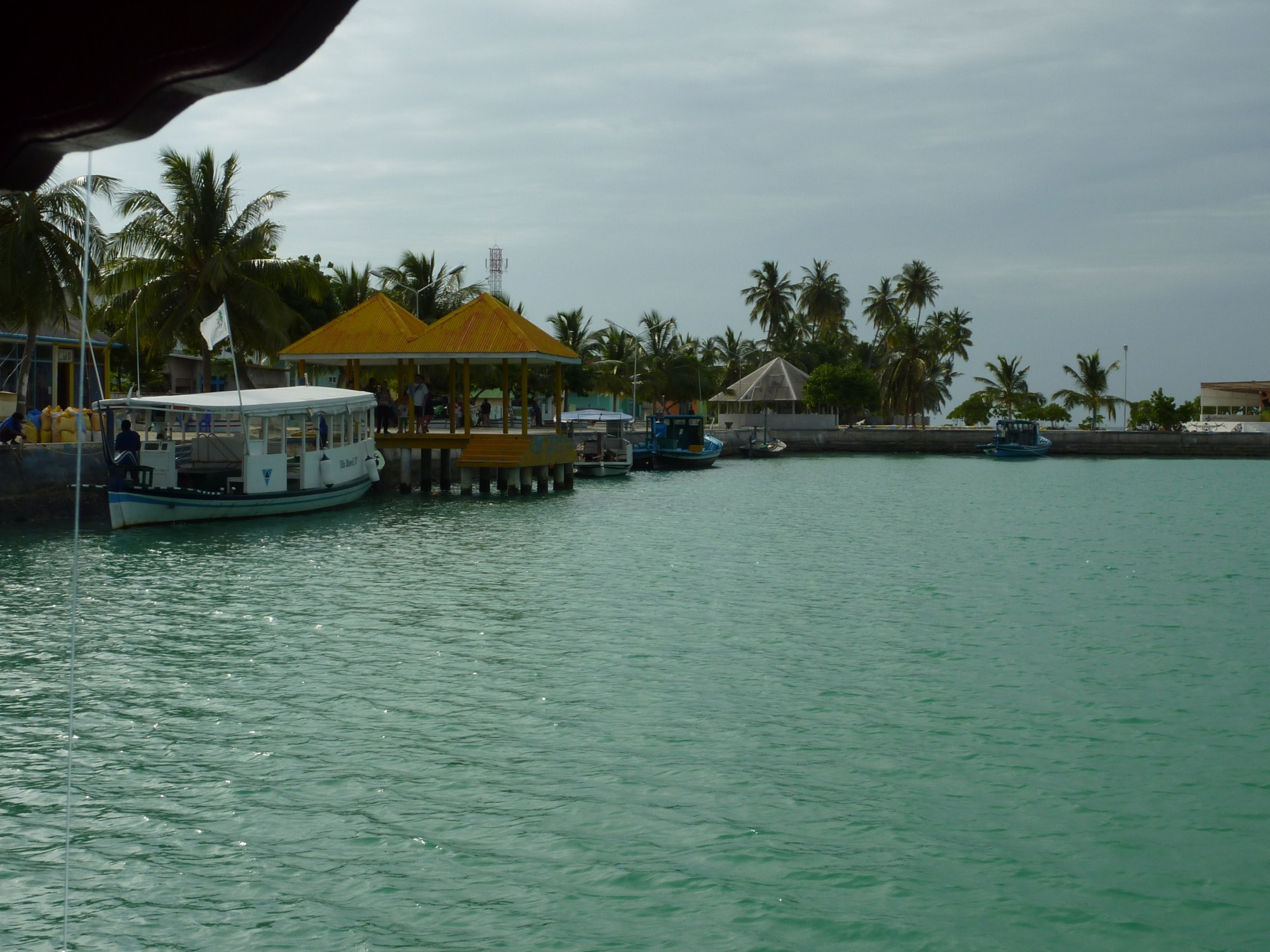
The Dharavandhoo break-water harbour jetty in 2012, prior to renovation
