= Ali Azim =

Maldivian film actor

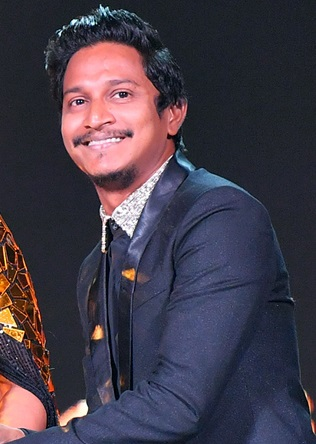
- Azim at 9th Gaumee Film Awards ceremony, 2019
- Occupation: Actor
- Years active: 2010–present
- Children: 1

Ali Azim is a Maldivian film actor.

== Career ==
=== 2010–2016: Early releases ===
Azim expressed his interest in acting at a very young age. Before he pursued a career in acting Azim worked as a dancer and stage performer. He was first recognized by the audience for his facial expressions while dancing. While working in the Animation Dance Group, the team made a short children's film Lollypop with "no serious intention but for entertainment". The film which features Azim in a "forgettable" role did not much help to accelerate his career. This was followed by Abdul Faththaah's 5 episodes drama series Kaiveni, starred opposite Mariyam Zuhura. In 2013, Azim starred in a small role as a gang member in Hussain Munawwar's second direction, revenge thriller film Dhilakani (2013) along with Ismail Rasheed, Niuma Mohamed, Mohamed Manik, Mohamed Faisal and Aminath Rishfa. The film deals with a man's tumultuous journey to seek vengeance and the demolition of family bond over a girl. The film attracted negative reception from critics while Nadheem wrote: "Embraced with futile characters, impractical scenes and out-dated music, the film has problems in each department".

Azim made his official film debut in Abdul Faththaah's romantic drama Aadheys starring Niuma Mohamed, Hussain Sobah, Amira Ismail, Moosa Zakariyya and Fathimath Azifa in pivotal roles. Filming was completed in 2011, though it was released three years following the death of film producer Hassain Ali. It revolves around a sacrificing mother and her affection towards her child. Azim played the role of Fahud, only son of a wealthy family whose marriage has been disputed by his parents. Upon release, the film received mixed reviews from critics and failed to leave an impression commercially. Ismail Naail reviewing from Vaguthu wrote: "Azim as a newcomer shines in the established cast". At the 8th Gaumee Film Awards he received a nomination for Best Male Debut nomination for his role in the film.

Mohamed Aboobakuru-directed Randhari was Azim's first release of 2015. His portrayal of the character Shahid, along with the film, received negative reviews from critics and the film performed below average at the box office. He was then seen in the Ali Shifau-directed romantic film Emme Fahu Vindha Jehendhen alongside Mohamed Jumayyil and Mariyam Majudha. In a pre-premiere review from Vaguthu, Ismail Nail noted Azim's "upgrade" in acting skills when compared to his previous works. The film was the highest grossing Maldivian film of the year, and was a commercial success.

=== 2017–present: Hahdhu, Dhevansoora and frequent collaborations ===
Azim's first release of 2017 came in the Ali Musthafa-directed Malikaa which performed badly at the box office. He next featured alongside an ensemble cast including Yoosuf Shafeeu, Mohamed Manik, Ahmed Saeed and Ali Seezan in the romantic comedy film Naughty 40 which was directed by Shafeeu. The film met with both critical and commercial success, emerging as one of the highest grossing Maldivian films of 2017. He next appeared in Abdul Faththaah-directed film Hahdhu. Though the film met with mixed reviews, Azim was particularly praised for his portrayal of the character, Hamza, a religious saint. Aishath Maaha of Avas wrote: "Perceived as a negative character, his acting skill during the emotional scenes, definitely proved that he is a wonderful actor". Azim regarded his performance in the film as a breakthrough performance in his career, which led him being offered several film projects afterwards. The film proved to be another successful venture for Azim, becoming the third highest-grossing film of the year.

2018 was a dull year for Maldivian film-industry with regards to 2018 Maldivian presidential election, hence only one film of Faisal was released during the year; a suspense thriller film Dhevansoora (2018) written and directed by Yoosuf Shafeeu. The film marks Shafeeu's thirtieth direction and features an ensemble cast of twenty-one actors. Revolving around a murder investigating, Azim played a character with dissociative identity disorder and the accused murderer. The film received positive reviews from critics and was considered a "norm-breaker" of the Maldivian cinema. Ahmed Hameed Adam reviewing from VNews considered Azim's performance as "one of the best performances of the film"; "Seen as Shafeeu's imaginary self in his youth, each and every scene of Azim shine with his cinematic brilliance". Ismail Nail Rasheed from Raajje.mv wrote:

"Azim's intense role as a mentally retarded man is the best performance Maldivian cinema has ever witnessed. He has dominated each scene that he was featured on irrespective of the experience as compared to other actors".

He then starred in the first Maldivian web-series, a romantic drama by Fathimath Nahula, Huvaa. The series consisting of sixty episodes and streamed through the digital platform Baiskoafu, centers around a happy and radiant family which breaks into despairing pieces after a tragic incident that led to an unaccountable loss. The series and his performance as the youngest sibling seeking vengeance for his deceased brother were positively received.

2019 was a successful year for Azim where he had multiple film releases. He first starred in Yoosuf Shafeeu's horror comedy film 40+ (2019), a sequel to 2017 released comedy film Naughty 40, which was well received both critically and commercially. Later during the year, the first Maldivian anthology film was released which featured him a victim of verbal and sexual abuse in the segment directed by Abdul Faththaah, titled Dharifiri . The project was shot in 2013 and digitally released six years later due to several delays in post-production. Their next collaboration, Nafrathuvumun (2019) played alongside Shafeeu, Mariyam Azza and Ahmed Easa revolves around a guesthouse, the only source of income for a woman who is convinced by several men to sell the property. Mariyam Waheedha from Miadhu picked his performance as the best from the cast. This was followed by another direction from Shafeeu, the romantic horror film Dhauvath (2019), which follows a happily married couple who goes on a honeymoon trip and the paranormal activities they experience due to black-magic. Mariyam Waheedha from Miadhu considers his performance to be the "usual good" though it lacks the "seriousness" which his character Razeen shall possess.

In 2022, Azim collaborated with Ahmed Nimal for three releases; the first is a family drama web series Lafuzu, starring opposite Mariyam Shifa, where he played the role of a one-sided lover. The team reunited for a mini web series titled Balgish, which narrates the life of an unfortunate child and the misfortunes which surround her. Apart from starring in a small role in Ali Seezan's web series Dhoadhi, he worked alongside an ensemble cast in the suspense thriller film Hehes (2022) by playing the role of an aspiring politician, which received mainly positive reviews from critics. His last release of the year was Aminath Rinaza and Ali Rasheed's web series Yasna, which narrates the story of two past lovers whose reunion is challenged by other commitments. The series received mixed to positive reviews, where the critics found the screenplay to be slow and dragging while the actors tried to give their best in an otherwise over the top melodrama.

In 2023, Azim played the role of a violent gang member in Ali Seezan's erotic thriller Loabi Vevijje, which follows a married man who becomes infatuated with a woman after a one-night stand. The film which was announced in 2019, but halted due to COVID-19 pandemic, opened to generally positive reviews from critics, where as his performance received mixed exceptionally good reviews from critics. Calling Azim's performance as her personal favorite performance from the film, Aminath Luba reviewing from The Press wrote: "Despite the minimal dialogues, Azim portrayed the character to its perfection; one which only him could justify". Similarly, Ahmed Nadheem from Dhauru applauded Azim for compensating "the bad acting from the rest of cast" with his brilliant portrayal of the character.

== Personal life ==
On 6 October 2019, Azim married Hawwa Jeena and they welcomes their first child on 5 December 2021.

== Filmography ==
Key
†	Denotes films that have not yet been released

=== Feature films ===
Year	Title	Role	Notes	Ref(s)
2013	Dhilakani	Shamin's friend	Special appearance	
2014	Aadheys	Fahud	Nominated—Gaumee Film Award for Best Male Debut	
2015	Randhari	Shahid		
2015	Emme Fahu Vindha Jehendhen	Shamin		
2017	Malikaa	Hassan		
2017	Naughty 40	Hassan		
2017	Hahdhu	Hamza	Gaumee Film Award for Best Supporting Actor	
2017	Bos	Abo		
2018	Dhevansoora	Hassan Shiyam	Nominated—Gaumee Film Award for Best Supporting Actor	
2019	40+	Nadheem		
2019	Nafrathuvumun	Shamin		
2019	Dhauvath	Razeen		
2019	Leena	Huzam		
2021	Maryam	Ihsaan		
2022	Hehes	Mubeen		
2023	Loabi Vevijje	Haseeb		
2023	Jokaru	Joharu		
2024	Udhabaani 2	Shareef		
2025	Koss Gina Mistake	Fazeen		
2026	Gilan	Naveel		
2026	Majunoon	Maadey		
2027	Party †		Filming	

=== Television ===
Year	Title	Role	Notes	Ref(s)
2012	Case 34	Shafeeq	Teledrama	
2012	Kaiveni	Nawal	Main role; 5 episodes	
2016	Bithufangi 2			
2018	Lam	Faisal	Main role; 4 episodes	
2018–2020	Huvaa	Ganim	Main role	
2019	Gellunu Furaana	Munthasir	Main role; 4 episodes	
2019–2021	Karu Hakuru	Zack	Main role	
2019	Yes Sir	Various characters	Recurring role	
2019	Hatharu Halha	Ali	In the segment Dharifiri	
2020	Hanaa	Yanaal	Main role; 13 episodes	
2020	Ehenas	Himself	Guest role; Episode: "Reality Check"	
2020–2021	Huvaa Kohfa Bunan	Maaish	Main role	
2021	Avahteriya	Ibrahim Solih	Main role; 9 episodes	
2021	Giridha	Ayaaz	Main role; 15 episodes	
2022–2023	Lafuzu	Akif	Main role; 32 episodes	
2022	Dhoadhi	Fazil	Recurring role; 5 episodes	
2022	Balgish	Arham	Main role; 5 episodes	
2022	Yasna	Fauzaan	Main role; 15 episodes	
2023	Hayyaru	Reehan	Main role; 15 episodes	
2023	Yaaraa	Riyaasha's date	Guest role; "Episode 5"	
2024–2025	Raiha	Yaanih	Main role; 12 episodes	

=== Short film ===
Year	Title	Role	Notes	Ref(s)
2010	Lollypop	Mansoo	Also the editor	

== Discography ==
Year	Album/Film	Song	Lyricist(s)	Co-Artist(s)
2023	Loabi Vevijje	"Loabi Vevijje" (Promo song)	Mohamed Abdul Ghanee	Abdullah Shafiu Ibrahim, Ali Seezan, Ahmed Nimal, Ahmed Easa, Mariyam Azza, Aminath Rishfa, Irufana Ibrahim

== Accolades ==
Year	Award	Category	Nominated work	Result	Ref(s)
2017	8th Gaumee Film Awards	Best Male Debut	Aadheys	Nominated	
2019	9th Gaumee Film Awards	Best Supporting Actor	Hahdhu	Won	
2019	9th Gaumee Film Awards	Best Supporting Actor	Dhevansoora	Nominated	
2019	9th Gaumee Film Awards	Jury Special Prize - Outstanding Round Performance	Hahdhu, Dhevansoora, Malikaa, Bos	Won	
2025	1st MSPA Film Awards	Best Supporting Actor – Male	Loabi Vevijje	Nominated	
2025	1st MSPA Film Awards	Best Negative Role	Dhevansoora	Nominated	
