= Mariyam Azza =

Maldivian film actress (born 1989)

Mariyam Azeezaa
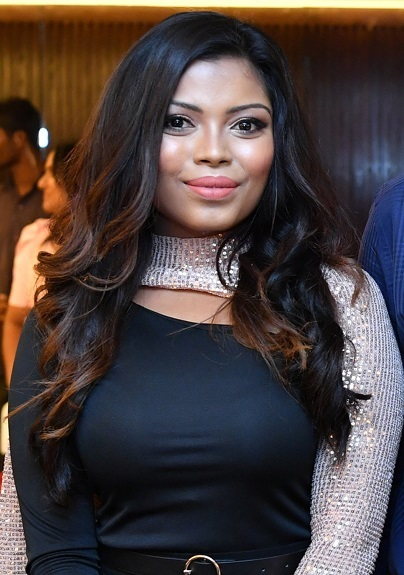
- Azza at Niuma Mohamed's Silver Jubilee celebration event, 2019
- Born: 20 April 1989 (age 37)
- Occupation: Actress
- Years active: 2005–present
- Spouses: Ismail Jumaih (divorced); Abdulla Muaz (m. 2020)
- Children: Mohamed Ethan Jumaih

Mariyam Azza (born 20 April 1989) is a Maldivian film actress. She is the daughter of actress Aminath Rasheedha and younger sister to actress turned director Aishath Rishmy.

== Early life ==
Born in Malé, Azza is the daughter of actress Aminath Rasheedha and the sister of actress Aishath Rishmy. She made a brief cameo appearance in the film Mithuru, along with Rishmy, which was produced by her step-father Shiyam and co-starring with Rasheedha. In 1997, she starred alongside Rasheedha in Mohamed Ali Manik's Maazee (2000) which narrates the story of two best friends, a boy and a girl, who get separated at childhood and reunite as adults. Azza played the child role of Neeza, a high self-esteemed girl who disregard her own mother and childhood best friend.

== Career ==
=== 2005–16: Debut and breakthrough ===
In 2005, Azza appeared in a video single titled "Loabiviyya" alongside her sister, Rishmy, which became a chartbuster. She then appeared in several songs produced by her family production. Azza made her acting debut in a supporting role with Hukuru Vileyrey (2006), co-directed by Aishath Rishmy and Aminath Rasheedha which was based on a novel published by Ibrahim Waheed on Haveeru Daily in 2003. The film was a critical and commercial success while being considered as "one of the few acceptable horror film the Maldivian Film Industry has ever produced". It was later released as 15 episodes television series with inclusion of several clips that were edited off while released in theatre. Her performance fetched her a Gaumee Film Award nomination for Best Supporting Actress.

In 2015, Azza collaborated with Fathimath Nahula for two television drama series. In the first release, a 15-episodes romantic series Vakivumuge Kurin, Azza portrayed a seductive colleague and an irresponsible wife who mistreats her mother. This was followed by Umurah Salaan (2015) which centers on a squabble family which is separated due to the greed for money and misunderstandings. The series which stars Mohamed Faisal, Aminath Rishfa, Ahmed Azmeel and Azza in lead roles, she portrays the character Shazly, an orphan who blindly trusts her husband.

In 2016, Azza played the role of Elisha, an innocent girl who becomes possessed while trapped in a house, in Fathimath Nahula's horror film 4426. Upon release, the film received mostly positive reviews from critics. Ahmed Nadheem of Avas labelled the film as a "masterpiece" and noted her performance to be "good" but not "consistent". However, it was also considered to be her "best performance" so far. Ahmed Adhushan reviewing for Mihaaru considered her dialogue delivery and expressions in the possessed scenes to "stand out" from the film while she delivered a "haunting performance" in her "breakthrough film". With twenty-five back-to-back housefull shows being screened, 4426 was declared as the highest-grossing film of the year in the Maldives.

=== 2017–22: Commercial success and web series ===
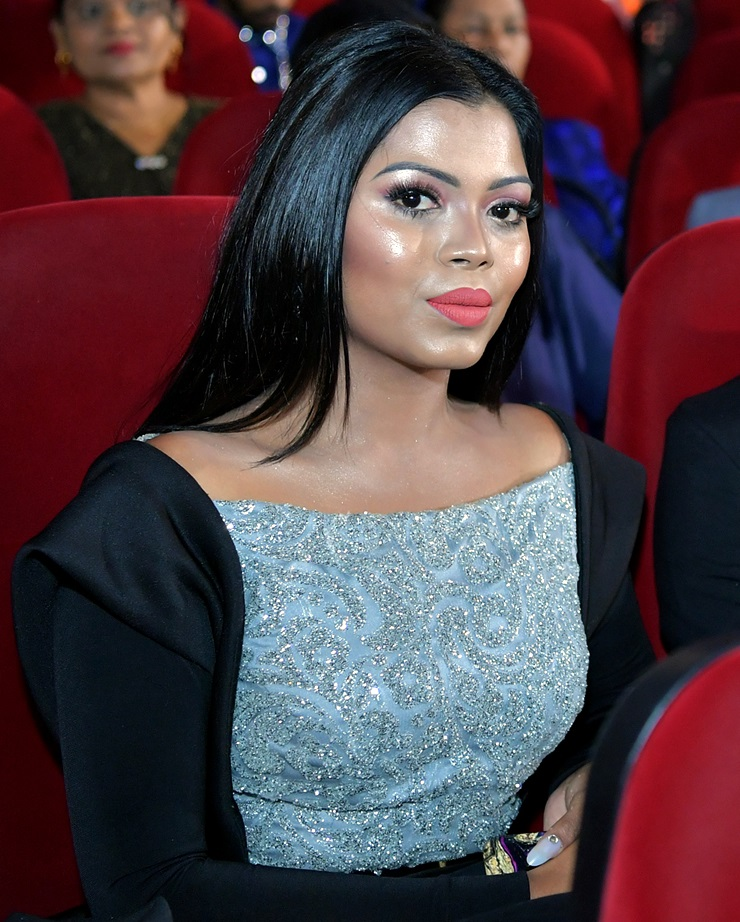
Azza at 9th Gaumee Film Awards ceremony, 2019

In 2017, Azza established herself as a leading actress of contemporary Maldivian cinema by featuring in four of the top-grossing productions of the year. Her first release of the year was the Ali Shifau-directed romantic comedy Mee Loaybakee alongside Mohamed Jumayyil. At the time of release, the film held the record of being the Maldivian film featuring the largest cast onscreen. The film tells the story of ex-lovers sliding into the friend zone, and the envy and diffidence they experience amidst a convoluted love-triangle. In the film, she played the role of Lam, an insecure friend of Ishan - her ex-boyfirend. The film and Azza's performance received mixed reviews, with Aishath Maaha of Avas calling her performance "a drawback from her previous films". The film emerged as one of the highest grossing Maldivian films of 2017. She next featured alongside an ensemble cast including Yoosuf Shafeeu, Mohamed Manik, Ahmed Saeed and Ali Seezan in another romantic comedy film Naughty 40 which was directed by Shafeeu. The film revolves around three friends, Ashwanee, Ahsan and Ajwad (Played by Shafeeu, Saeed and Manik respectively) who are single and having a youthful outlook, in spite of being in their forties. She featured in dual roles - Ziyana, a woman who gets impregnated after being sexually assaulted, and later as Ashwa, the daughter of Ziyana, an introverted daughter who meets her father after nineteen years. The film met with both critical and commercial success, emerging as one of the highest grossing Maldivian films of 2017.

Abdul Faththaah's romantic drama Hahdhu was Azza's next film release. She was paid MVR50,000 for the role in the film, becoming the highest-paid actress in the Maldivian film industry alongside Niuma Mohamed for her work in Niuma. The film touched upon controversial issues in the Maldives including the depiction of flogging and also shines a light on mental health by featuring an attempted suicide. Azza played the role of Yusra, an acquiescent and talkative young woman whose life changes with an extramarital affair. A reviewer from Avas wrote: "The transition from being loquacious to reticent, she played the character whole-heatedly saddening the audience with absolute emotions". The film opened to mixed reviews from critics though it emerged as one of the highest grossing Maldivian films of the year.

Her fourth and final release of the year was Aishath Rishmy's romantic drama Bos. Penned and produced by Fathimath Nahula, the film tells the story of a woman from a royal family and her battle with depression after the demise of her father. Azza played the lead character Ibaa, who has depression and is forced into an arranged marriage. A reviewer from Avas criticised the film for having a resemblance to American coming-of-age romantic drama A Walk to Remember (2002) and Indian romantic drama Sanam Teri Kasam (2016). The film along with her performance attracted mixed to positive critical reaction. The film emerged as the highest grossing Maldivian film of 2017 and Azza's fifth consecutive success at box office. During the year, Azza hosted the celebrity-based talk show Azxonna, where she interviews actors, directors and other prominent members of the Maldivian film industry. The first season consisting of thirteen episodes were aired from 13 February 2017.

2018 was a dull year for Maldivian film-industry with regards to 2018 Maldivian presidential election. Her only release of the year was the first Maldivian web-series, a romantic drama by Fathimath Nahula, Huvaa. The series consisting of sixty episodes and streamed through the digital platform Baiskoafu, centers around a happy and radiant family which breaks into despairing pieces after a tragic incident that led to an unaccountable loss. The series and her performance as a divorcee struggling to choose between her abusive ex-husband and a caring young man were positively received.

The following year, Azza starred in Nafrathuvumun (2019) alongside Shafeeu, Ali Azim and Ahmed Easa which revolves around a guesthouse, the only source of income for a woman who is convinced by several men to sell the property. Mariyam Waheedha from Miadhu praised Azza's "dynamic" performance and preferred her negative side of the character than her vulnerable personality. This was followed by another direction from Shafeeu, the romantic horror film Dhauvath (2019) which follows a happily married couple who goes on a honeymoon trip and the paranormal activities they experience due to black-magic. Mariyam Waheedha from Miadhu considers her portrayal of the character Zeeniya as "relevant in the horror scenes but unnatural in the calm scenes".

=== 2023–present: Further releases ===
In 2023, Azza played the role of a devoted wife in Ali Seezan's erotic thriller Loabi Vevijje, which follows a married man who becomes infatuated with a woman after a one-night stand. The film which was announced in 2019, but halted due to COVID-19 pandemic, opened to generally positive reviews from critics, where as her performance received mixed reviews from critics. Aminath Luba reviewing from The Press found her performance to be "strictly average, nothing exceptional". Similarly, Ahmed Nadheem from Dhauru called her acting "not bad" and "generally okay".

== Media image ==
Following the success of 4426, Hahdhu and Bos, Azza's film roles were subject to wide commercial analysis. Analysing her career, Avas published that director Fathiman Nahula hits "ambergris jackpot" by casting Azza as the leading lady in 4426. She was described as the "replacement" of Niuma Mohamed whom the media cites as the most successful leading actress in Maldives. In 2011, Azza was voted sixth place as the "Most Entertaining Actress" in the SunFM Awards 2010, an award night ceremony initiated by Sun Media Group to honour the most recognized personalities in different fields, during the previous year. In 2017, she was the most successful contemporary actress in the Maldives. She is an active celebrity endorser for several brands and products. In 2018, she was ranked in the fifth position from Dho?'s list of Top Ten Actresses of Maldives where writer Aishath Maaha called her the most "bright and demanding" actress from the current generation.

== Personal life ==
Azza married actor Ismail Jumaih and have a son Ethan from him. The couple got divorced afterwards. She then married one of her co-stars Abdulla Muaz on 20 February 2020.

== Filmography ==
Key
†	Denotes films that have not yet been released

=== Feature film ===
Year	Title	Role	Notes	Ref(s)
1993	Mithuru	—N/a	Child actor	
1998	Fahuneyvaa	Aishath Haifa	Special appearance	
2000	Maazee	Neeza	Child actor	
2000	Saahibaa	Herself	Special appearance	
2006	Hukuru Vileyrey	Azza	Nominated—Gaumee Film Award for Best Supporting Actress	
2010	Fanaa	Herself	Special appearance in the song "Dhoapatta"	
2011	Wathan	Herself	Special appearance in the song "Dhurun Balaashey"	
2016	4426	Elisha		
2017	Mee Loaybakee	Lamha	Nominated—Gaumee Film Award for Best Actress	
2017	Naughty 40	Ziyana / Ashwa		
2017	Hahdhu	Yusra Ali	Nominated—Gaumee Film Award for Best Actress	
2017	Bos	Ibaa		
2019	40+	Herself	Special appearance in song "Lailaa"	
2019	Nafrathuvumun	Reesha		
2019	Dhauvath	Zeeniya		
2019	Maamui	Haifa		
2019	Leena	Aminath Leena		
2023	Loabi Vevijje	Hasna		
2023	Nina	Azza	Special appearance in an item number "Azza"	
2024	Kamanaa	Rimsha		
2024	Roboman: The Movie	Judge	Special appearance	
2025	Sorry	Zaara		
2025	Kan'bulo	Maya		
2025	Koss Gina Mistake	Shaina		
2026	Magey Bituge Wedding	Herself	Special appearance in song "Kaiveni Medley"	
2026	Dhevi	Maashee / Maahee		Also the producer

=== Television ===
Year	Title	Role	Notes	Ref(s)
2008	Hama Ekani Kalaayahtakai	Nadhuwa	Main role; 5 episodes	
2015	Vakivumuge Kurin	Maisha	Main role; 15 episodes	
2015–2016	Umurah Salaan	Shazly	Main role; 13 episodes	
2018–2020	Huvaa	Minha	Main role	
2021	Hatharu Manzaru	Sama / Zeena	Voice-over in the segment "Hayaaiy"; Main role in the segment "Ruqyah"	
2021–2022	Mazloom	Hamsha	Guest role in "Chapter 3: Minju"; Main role in "Chapter 4: Hintha"	
2022	Biruveri Vaahaka	Lahoo	Main role; 7 episodes	
2023–2024	Yaaraa	Shaayaa	Main role; 50 episodes	
2026	JunJulaa	Nasha	Guest role;	

=== Short film ===
Year	Title	Role	Notes	Ref(s)
2008	Farihibe 2	Zareefa		
2009	Pink Fairy	Herself	Special appearance in the song "Pink Fairy"	
2011	Farihibe 3	Futhoona		
2022	Hashi	Faraha		

== Discography ==
Year	Album/Film	Song	Lyricist(s)	Co-Artist(s)
2023	Loabi Vevijje	"Loabi Vevijje" (Promo song)	Mohamed Abdul Ghanee	Abdullah Shafiu Ibrahim, Ali Seezan, Ahmed Nimal, Ahmed Easa, Ali Azim, Aminath Rishfa, Irufana Ibrahim

== Accolades ==
Year	Award	Category	Nominated work	Result	Ref(s)
2008	5th Gaumee Film Awards	Best Supporting Actress	Hukuru Vileyrey	Nominated	
2011	2nd SunFM Awards	Most Entertaining Actress		Nominated	
2019	9th Gaumee Film Awards	Best Actress	Mee Loaybakee	Nominated	
2019	9th Gaumee Film Awards	Best Actress	Hahdhu	Nominated	
2025	5th Karnataka International Film Festival	Best Lead Actress	Kamanaa	Won	
