= List of Maldivian films of 2026 =

This is a list of Maldivian films scheduled to be released in 2026.

== Releases ==
=== Feature film ===
Opening		Title	Director	Cast	Ref.
JAN	07	Paree - Chapter 1	Ali Seezan	Ali Seezan; Aishath Rishmy; Mohamed Jumayyil; Sheela Najeeb; Mariyam Lamsha	
JAN	28	Dhoadhi (2026 film)	Movanu Shafeeq	Shahudhaan Shareef; Lana Jaleel; Aminath Inna; Ahmed Shareesh; Amira Ismail	
APR	06	Paree - Chapter 2	Ali Seezan	Ali Seezan; Aishath Rishmy; Mohamed Jumayyil; Sheela Najeeb; Mariyam Lamsha	
APR	29	Lamha (Maldivian Film)	Mohamed Hilmy	Ahmed Easa; Nuzuhath Shuaib; Ahmed Sharif; Aisha Ali	
JUN	30	Gilan (2026 film)	Amjad Ibrahim	Yoosuf Shafeeu; Fathimath Azifa; Ahmed Saeed; Aminath Noora; Ali Azim; Mariyam Shakeela; Mohamed Rasheed	
AUG	03	Jannath	Ali Shifau	Sharaf Abdulla; Aminath Shuha; Ismail Rasheed; Mohamed Afrah; Aishath Yaadha; Mohamed Rasheed; Aaidha Hammaadh; Aminath Aseela; Maahrene Mohamed Ali	
AUG	20	Samra	Ibrahim Zen Ahmed	Ibrahim Zen Ahmed; Rashfa Farooq; Aminath Shafga; Mohamed Navy	
SEP	03	Magey Bituge Wedding	Shahudha Mahmoodh	Sharaf Abdulla; Fathimath Raaya; Abdullah Shafiu Ibrahim; Aminath Noora; Ahmed Saeed; Sheela Najeeb; Hazif Mohamed; Abdulla Zaleeshan; Mariyam Majudha; Mariyam Azza; Aishath Rishmy; Nuzuhath Shuaib; Ansham Mohamed; Aminath Shuha; Aishath Yaadha	
SEP	26	Dhevi	Hussain Hazim	Mariyam Azza; Sharaf Abdulla; Hamdhan Saleem; Aishath Rishmy; Ismail Rasheed; Mohamed Manik; Amira Ismail; Ahmed Saeed; Maleeha Waheed; Aminath Rasheedha; Aishath Raaisha; Nathasha Jaleel; Aminath Aseela; Ansham Mohamed; Nuzuhath Shuaib	
OCT	26	Majunoon	Fathimath Nahula	Ahmed Sharif; Mariyam Shifa; Ahmed Easa; Washiya Mohamed; Saamee Hussain Didi; Ali Azim; Ayesha Layaali Sinan; Evelin Livi Firaash	
NOV	25	Keevve?	Easa Shareef	Reeko Moosa Manik; Sheela Najeeb; Mariyam Nisha; Ali Shameel; Washiya Mohamed; Aminath Rishfa; Mohamed Rasheed; Aishath Laisha Latheef; Nauseen Shareef; Naureen Shareef; Azleef Khaleel	
DEC	26	Dhaleyka	Hamid Ali	Amira Ismail; Shafiu Mohamed; Ahmed Easa; Shaheedha Ahmed; Ahmed Asim; Hamid Ali; Mariyam Shafaza	

=== Television ===
Opening		Title	Director(s)	Cast	Notes	Ref.
FEB	21	Ekaniveri Hithakun...	Mohamed Faisal	Ahmed Sharif; Ansham Mohamed; Ismail Jumaih; Shaheedha Ahmed; Mohamed Manik; Amira Ismail; Mariyam Haleem; Ali Shazleem; Roona	6 episodes	
MAR	20	Barudhaasth	Ibrahim Wisan	Ahmed Easa; Aminath Noora; Saamee Hussain Didi; Washiya Mohamed; Aishath Laisha Latheef; Hazif Mohamed; Arusha Ibrahim; Hamid Ali		
MAY	02	Ganaa	Ravee Farooq	Aminath Lamha Latheef; Ali Nadheeh; Aminath Shuha; Abdullah Shafiu Ibrahim; Hamdhan Farooq; Hamdhoon Farooq; Sharaf Abdulla; Ahmed Sharif; Mohamed Afrah; Mariyam Haleem		
AUG	06	Beynun	Shahudha Mahmoodh	Sharaf Abdulla; Aminath Shuha; Washiya Mohamed; Hazif Mohamed; Maaish Ismail Niyaz		
SEP	10	Huvaa (season 3)	Aishath Rishmy	Aminath Rishfa; Mohamed Faisal; Mariyam Azza; Ahmed Easa; Sheela Najeeb; Ahmed Azmeel; Ali Azim; Nashidha Mohamed; Ibrahim Jihad		
OCT	03	JunJulaa	Azuhan Ibrahim	Washiya Mohamed; Ahmed Abaan; Mohamed Ishfan; Saamee Hussain Didi; Mariyam Nisha; Nuzuhath Shuaib; Mariyam Shifa; Sheela Najeeb; Jadhulla Ismail; Aminath Aseela; Fathimath Raaya; Aman Ali; Aishath Laisha Latheef; Fathimath Latheefa; Mariyam Shakeela; Ali Farooq; Aisha Ali; Ahmed Sharif; Ahmed Easa; Mariyam Azza; Aishath Rishmy; Aminath Rishfa; Ahmed Azmeel; Shaheedha Ahmed; Mariyam Lamsa Latheef; Ansham Mohamed		

=== Short film ===
Opening		Title	Director	Cast	Ref.
FEB	18	Bappa	Azhan Ibrahim	Ali Shameel; Mohamed Ishfan; Washiya Mohamed; Arifa Ali	
MAY	10	Dear Diary	Fathmath Naaisha Nashid	Ravee Farooq; Dheena Ahmed; Aisha Ali; Ahmed Maeesh; Saara Shuaib	

== See also ==
- List of Maldivian films of 2025
- Lists of Maldivian films
