= Moosun =

Maldivian web series

- Written by: Shahudha Mahmoodh
- Directed by: Ali Shifau; Mohamed Faisal
- Starring: Mohamed Rasheed; Mohamed Mazeen; Aisha Ali; Saamee Hussain Didi; Mohamed Vishal; Aishath Laisha Latheef
- Music by: Hussain Thaufeeq
- Country of origin: Maldives
- Original language: Divehi
- No. of seasons: 1
- No. of episodes: 10

Production
- Producers: Aishath Fuwad; Mohamed Ali
- Cinematography: Ahmed Zifaaf; Mohamed Faisal
- Editor: Ali Shifau
- Running time: 18-25 minutes
- Production company: Dark Rain Entertainment

Original release
- Network: MediaNet
- Release: August 25 – October 20, 2025

Moosun is a Maldivian romantic drama web series written by Shahudha Mahmoodh and co-directed by Ali Shifau and Mohamed Faisal. It stars Mohamed Rasheed in the lead role as a successful entrepreneur whose past affairs lead to his downfall. The series spans events set decades apart, with the past portrayed by Aisha Ali and Mohamed Mazeen, while the present is depicted by Saamee Hussain Didi, Mohamed Vishal, Aishath Laisha Latheef, Fathimath Latheefa, Mariyam Haleem, and Ahmed Saeed. The first episode of the series was released on 25 August 2025.

== Premise ==
Banished after a scandal, Irfan fathers two sons, Akif, raised in hardship, and Iyaan, in privilege. Years later, Akif returns for revenge, shattering Irfan's family. But as betrayal, love and tragedy collide, they must face the past and choose between hatred and forgiveness.

== Cast and characters ==
=== Main ===
- Mohamed Rasheed as Irfan Adhil
- Mohamed Mazeen as young Irfan Adhil
- Aisha Ali as Nirasha
- Saamee Hussain Didi as Akif
- Mohamed Vishal as Iyan
- Aishath Laisha Latheef as Aira; Irfan's daughter
- Fathimath Latheefa as Sofia; Irfan's wife
- Mariyam Haleem as Dhona/Ziyana
- Ahmed Saeed as Rizwan; Irfan's rival
- Nuzuhath Shuaib as Inasha
- Aminath Shuha as Rasha; Iyan's girlfriend

=== Recurring ===
- Roanu Hassan Manik as Faheem; Rasha's father
- Mohamed Afrah as Aadhanu; Nirasha's father
- Ali Shazleem as Adam; Irfan's father
- Aishath Gulfa as Zahidha; Irfan's mother
- Abdullah Shafiu Ibrahim as Shaheen
- Rawahath Abdulla as Ali; Irfan's friend
- Ibrahim Shiyaz as Old Ali
- Fathimath Shaina Ahmed as Shadhiya; Nirasha's friend
- Mariyam Rikza Ali as Young Dhona/Ziyana
- Ahmed Sunie as Lawyer
- Adam Rizwee as Nawaz
- Ahmed Shakir as Doctor
- Yoosuf Zuhury as Doctor
- Ahmed Mohamed as Police
- Mustho Hakeem as Police

=== Guest ===
- Aminath Musheera as Old Nirasha (Episode: "Exile")
- Aishath Seema as Old Shaadhiya (Episode: "Exile")
- Abdul Gafoor Ali as Gafoor; Shadhiya's friend (Episode: "Exile")
- Mohamed Yamin as Gang member (Episode: "The Farewell")
- Ahmed Ibrahim as Gang member (Episode: "The Farewell")
- Yoosuf Mahran Firusha as baby Akif
- Ali Rayyan Ahmed as 7-8 years old Akif
- Mohamed Raeef Ahmed as 11-13 years old Akif

== Episodes ==
No.	Title	Directed by	Original release date
1	"Exile"	Ali Shifau	August 25, 2025
A flashback reveals Irfan’s exile to a remote island after a violent outburst during a football match. There, he secretly falls in love with Nirasha, a young woman determined to pursue her studies before marriage. Despite her father Aadhanu’s disapproval, Nirasha and Irfan grow close, eventually sharing a risky, emotional night together. Years later, Nirasha’s grown son, Akif, rushes to the hospital after hearing of his mother’s sudden illness, only to learn that she has passed away. In his grief, Nirasha’s childhood friend Shadhiya unveils a shattering truth—that Irfan, the father he never knew, is not only alive but also a powerful businessman, Irfan Adhil, and the very man responsible for the family’s downfall.
2	"The Wall Between"	Ali Shifau	August 25, 2025
For the sake of Nirasha’s happiness, her father reluctantly accepts Irfan but warns her to continue the relationship only if Irfan truly comes back for her. Returning to Malé, Irfan joins the same company where his father works. Soon, he finds himself under immense pressure to enter an arranged marriage that would elevate the family’s status. Realizing he has no choice, Irfan delivers the heartbreaking news to Nirasha.
3	"Two Sons"	Ali Shifau	September 1, 2025
After receiving a letter from Irfan urging her to forget him, Nirasha travels to Malé seeking clarity about their relationship. Instead, she is humiliated by Irfan’s mother and sister, while Irfan remains firm in his decision to end things. Soon after, Nirasha discovers she is pregnant, a revelation that leads to her father disowning her. Before she can reconcile with him, he passes away, leaving her to face the burden alone with only the support of her loyal friend Shadhiya. Irfan, pressured by his family and denying responsibility for the unborn child, goes on to marry elsewhere. Nirasha gives birth to Akif, while Irfan’s wife delivers Iyaan. As the years pass, Nirasha struggles to raise Akif amid hardship, while Irfan—unaware of Akif’s existence—rises to prominence as a successful businessman. Akif grows up strong but resentful of the life denied to him, in contrast to Iyaan, who enjoys a privileged and carefree upbringing.
4	"The Farewell"	Ali Shifau	September 8, 2025
Akif, consumed by rage, travels to Malé determined to ruin Irfan’s life. Disguising himself as the son of Irfan’s cousin Ali, he manages to stay in the same apartment as Irfan, though Dhona quickly grows suspicious of his true intentions. Meanwhile, Iyaan is pressured into joining the family business while also preparing for his wedding to Rasha, a close family friend. The following day, Akif orchestrates a staged attack on Aira by a gang, only to intervene and earn the family’s trust. His calculated move works, and Irfan, impressed by his courage, offers him a position at his workplace—an opportunity Akif accepts as part of his hidden agenda.
5	"The Infiltration"	Ali Shifau	September 15, 2025
Akif begins working at Irfan’s office, secretly planting a bug in his workstation to monitor private conversations. Through this, he learns of an ongoing rivalry between Irfan and a family relative, Rizwan. Seizing the opportunity, Akif approaches Rizwan with a proposal to bring down Iru Industry in exchange for a thirty-percent share of Rizwan’s business. Suspicious of Akif’s motives, Rizwan assigns Insasha to investigate his background and uncover his true connection to Iru Industry.
6	"Lines Crossed"	Ali Shifau	September 22, 2025
Akif’s plan for revenge begins to unfold as he helps bring Ayra and Shahin closer. Meanwhile, Irfan suffers significant business losses to Rizwan and vents his frustration on Iyaan, accusing him of being careless and lacking seriousness in managing the business. Though Rizwan rejects Akif’s initial offer, he entrusts him with leading the project. With his mission advancing, Akif resigns from Irfan’s office and moves out of the family home. In response, Irfan forbids the family from acknowledging Akif, further widening the rift within the household.
7	"Nothing Stays Hidden"	Ali Shifau	September 29, 2025
Iyaan returns home distressed, and Dhona encourages him to lean on Rasha for support. In an effort to stabilize the business, Iyaan agrees to marry Rasha, though her excitement for the union gradually wanes as she begins developing feelings for Akif instead. Meanwhile, Akif catches Ayra with Shaheen and deliberately invites Sofia to the scene, leaving Ayra humiliated. Shaheen finally confides in Ayra, revealing the truth he had long kept hidden.
8	TBA	Ali Shifau	October 8, 2025
9	TBA	Ali Shifau	October 13, 2025
10	TBA	Ali Shifau	October 20, 2025

== Soundtrack ==
Track listing
No.	Title	Lyrics	Music	Singer(s)	Length
1.	"Moosun"	Mohamed Shammoon	Hussain Thaufeeq	Mariyam Ashfa
2.	"Moosumey Mee"	Mohamed Zaheen	Ayyuman Shareef	Umar Zahir, Shifa Thaufeeq

== Release and reception ==
The first episode of the series was released on 25 August 2025 on MediaNet's VideoClub. The series received positive reviews from critics, with particular praise for its screenplay, direction, cinematography, and the performances of the lead actors.
