= Dark Rain Chronicles =

Maldivian web series

- Written by: Ahmed Tholal; Ali Shifau
- Directed by: Ali Shifau
- Country of origin: Maldives
- Original language: Divehi
- No. of seasons: 2
- No. of episodes: 15

Production
- Cinematography: Ali Shifau; Aaim Zamyr
- Editor: Ali Shifau
- Production company: Dark Rain Entertainment

Original release
- Release: November 12, 2022

Dark Rain Chronicles is a Maldivian anthology web series directed by Ali Shifau. The first season, comprising six revenge thriller short segments, premiered on 12 November 2022. All segments from the first season were directed by Ali Shifau with Shifau and Ahmed Tholal credited as the writers.

The second season consisting of eight segments focusing on love, premiered on 1 January 2024. Shahudha Mahmood joined Shifau in the second season, directing four segments and being credited as the writer for five segments.

== Cast and characters ==
=== Season 1 (2022) ===
Assalaam Alaikum

- Adam Rizwee as Naail
- Sharaf Abdulla as Ahmed
- Mariyam Haleem as Hafeeza Ali; Naail's mother
- Ahmed Mohamed
- Ibrahim Shiyaz as Matheen
- Fathimath Latheefa as Ahmed's mother
- Ahmed Sunie as Matheen's friend

Fureytha

- Ahmed Sunie as Lirar
- Aishath Yaadha as Ainth
- Mohamed Shivaz as Nafiz
- Fathimath Zuhair as Ainth's friend

Rankolhaa

- Ismail Rasheed as Shareef
- Fathimath Sara Adam as Anoosha
- Mohamed Vishal as Adam
- Fainaz as Areesha
- Adam Rizwee as a customer

Surprise

- Ahmed Saeed as Azee
- Ismail Jumaih as Nadey
- Aminath Aseela as Liu
- Ali Nadheeh as Azee's subordinate

Party

- Ali Shameel as Yasir
- Hamdhoon Farooq as Ahdhu
- Ali Shazleem
- Azmee Adam Naseer
- Ahmed Mohamed
- Izzak
- Mohamed Naail

Nostalgia

- Ahmed Shakir as Nagidh
- Ahmed Sharif as Riyaz
- Adam Rizwee as a customer

=== Season 2 (2024) ===
Baiskalu

- Sheela Najeeb as Aafiya
- Ahmed Saeed as Razzag
- Aishath Razan Ramiz as Raniya
- Saamee Hussain Didi as Zihan

Lemon Cake

- Nuzuhath Shuaib as Sama Ali
- Sharaf Abdulla as Rayaan Mohamed
- Aisha Ali as Sara Ali
- Mariyam Majudha as Riyana
- Mohamed Vishal as Shuhan
- Ansham Mohamed
- Mariyam Azza
- Aishath Rishmy

Lafzu

- Roanu Hassan Manik as Hashim
- Ravee Farooq as Ali Zayan
- Aishath Yaadha as Minha

Dejavu

- Mohamed Faisal as Azim
- Aminath Shuha as Saaya
- Sharaf Abdulla as Rayaan Mohamed

Dhemaa

- Abdullah Shafiu Ibrahim as Shah
- Maleeha Waheed as Shamha
- Ahmed Shakir as Shah's friend
- Fathimath Sara Adam as Mira

Mee Loabi

- Ahmed Easa as Affan
- Aishath Yaadha as Minha

Dhey Handhaan

- Mariyam Majudha as Riyana
- Mohamed Vishal as Shuhan
- Nuzuhath Shuaib as Sama Ali
- Maleeha Waheed as Shamha

Dhuruvaan Jehunas

- Ahmed Sharif as Zaleef
- Aminath Aseela as Asra

== Chapters ==
=== Series overview ===
Season	Episodes	Originally released		
Season	Episodes	First released	Last released	Network
1	6	November 12, 2022	December 19, 2022	Baiskoafu
2	9	January 1, 2024	February 26, 2024	Baiskoafu

=== Season 1: Revenge thriller (2022) ===
No. overall	No. in season	Title	Directed by	Written by	Camera by	Original release date
1	1	"Assalaam Alaikum"	Ali Shifau	Ahmed Tholal	Ali Shifau	November 12, 2022
Hafeeza, a patient suffering from short term memory loss, receives a fraud call from a desperate young man, Naail, impersonating as a staff from a Bank. The scammer cunningly transfers her life saving to his account. Hafeeza ultimately finds out about the scam and dies from the trauma. Few months later, Hafeeza's only son, Naail traces Ahmed and blackmails him to retrieve the money.
2	2	"Fureytha"	Ali Shifau	Ahmed Tholal	Ali Shifau	November 21, 2022
Ainth, a housewife is constantly abused by her dominating husband, Lirar, a renowned comedian. Later one night, a fight ensues resulting Ainth stabbing Lirar on his neck by a scissor and cleverly disposing his body.
3	3	"Rankolhaa"	Ali Shifau	Ahmed Tholal	Ali Shifau	November 27, 2022
Adam and Anoosha continues having casual sex. Adam starts having romantic feelings towards her while Anoosha insists them to remain only as sexual partners. During one such conversations, Adam declares he will murder any person who harms Anoosha. Contended, she invites a pervert, Shareef and Adam to a guest house which results the invitees sharing shame, confusions and anguish, while Anoosha receiving her long awaited revenge.
4	4	"Surprise"	Ali Shifau	Ali Shifau	Ali Shifau	December 5, 2022
Liu, married to a manipulative and wealthy businessman, Azee, has an extramarital affair with Nadey, who insists her to poison Azee. On their anniversary, Liu attempts to execute their plan and everything goes smoothly as planned. However, as Azee falls to the ground, Liu tries to call Nadey but unable to connect to him. In a turn of events, she realized that Azee is several steps ahead of them in their ploy and there is no escape for them.
5	5	"Party"	Ali Shifau	Ahmed Tholal	Ali Shifau	December 12, 2022
Yasir, a high-ranked police officer becomes a drug addict after the demise of his loving son. In his sever condition, Yasir goes to extreme measures to ensure that his son murderer receives the treatment.
6	6	"Nostalgia"	Ali Shifau	Ahmed Tholal	Aaim Zamyr, Ali Shifau	December 19, 2022
Riyaz, is joined by a stranger, Nagidh, at a restaurant, who claims to be a classmate of Riyaz at fifth grade. During their interactions, Riyaz recollects his memories of their childhood and faintly remembers Nagidh as his classmate who was bullied by him and his friends, Naufal and Imad. Nagidh, currently working as medical trainee, get his opportunity to take revenge on his bullies by poisoning every one of them.

=== Season 2: Love (2024) ===
No. overall	No. in season	Title	Directed by	Written by	Camera by	Original release date
7	1	"Baiskalu"	Ali Shifau	Ahmed Tholal	Ahmed Zifaaf	January 1, 2024
A contentedly married couple visits Sultan Park, indulging in memories of their childhood and the early days of their relationship. While there, they come across a young couple facing turmoil as the husband has forgotten their wedding anniversary due to his hectic schedule. Sensing an opportunity to help, the older couple intervenes, emphasizing that love can transcend any situation. As they share their own experiences, the middle-aged couple substantiates their statements in practice, offering the younger couple a reassuring perspective on enduring love.
8	2	"Lemon Cake (Part 1)"	Shahudha Mahmood	Shahudha Mahmood	Ahmed Zifaaf	January 8, 2024
Sara returns to the city and crosses paths with Rayaan, her sister Sama's boyfriend, whom she has been avoiding. Sama discovers notes revealing Rayaan's struggle with depression but is too afraid to confront him, despite Sara's advice. Tragedy strikes when Rayaan overdoses on pills and is hospitalized. Sama stays by his side but is called away for an urgent meeting, reluctantly asking Sara to take her place for a short while, to which Sara hesitantly agrees.
9	3	"Lemon Cake (Part 2)"	Shahudha Mahmood	Shahudha Mahmood	Ahmed Zifaaf	January 15, 2024
Sara, feeling hungry, brings food to the hospital, including Rayaan's favorite lemon cake. Sama notices Rayaan's gradual improvement due to Sara’s presence and convinces her to visit more often under various pretexts, always with a lemon cake in hand. Sara secures a scholarship placement, but this triggers a relapse in Rayaan’s mental health. Meanwhile, Sara is devastated when her colleague steals her presentation for the scholarship submission, driving her to contemplate ending her life. Before taking any drastic step, she stumbles upon an article where Rayaan credits her for giving him a reason to live, revealing that Sama is his best friend, not his lover.
10	4	"Lafzu"	Ali Shifau	Ahmed Tholal	Ahmed Zifaaf	January 22, 2024
Hashim, an elderly man estranged from his family due to past mistakes, advertises for a caretaker. Zayan, a young man living in solitude after his mother's death, takes up the offer for a modest monthly fee. As they spend time together, they bond over shared activities like beach outings and watching classic films. Their conversations grow deeper, exploring Hashim's regrets and Zayan's memories of his late mother. In an emotional revelation, it comes to light that Zayan is Hashim's illegitimate son, bringing their connection full circle and offering a chance for redemption and healing.
11	5	"Dejavu"	Shahudha Mahmood	Shahudha Mahmood	Ahmed Zifaaf	January 29, 2024
Saaya, an introvert, meets Azim, an accountant, while jogging, and they agree to have coffee if they cross paths again. During their meeting, Saaya feels a strong sense of déjà vu, which she admits has been happening since an accident that left her in a coma for weeks. She vaguely remembers similar conversations and incidents but can't piece them together. t’s revealed that Azim is her lover, whom she forgot due to memory loss from the accident. Determined to reconnect, Azim recreates their moments together, hoping to rekindle their love.
12	6	"Dhemaa"	Ali Shifau	Shahudha Mahmood	Ahmed Zifaaf	February 7, 2024
Shah sells a PlayStation CD to Shamha, who is passionate about breaking gender stereotypes. They bond over shared ideals and fall in love, leading to Shah proposing to her. Shamha accepts but mysteriously leaves soon after, saying she has to go. Later, Shah meets Mira, an equally determined and independent woman with the same mission for gender equality. Their connection grows and starts a relationship. However, Mira soon discovers Shah's past with Shamha. Furious, the two women team up and attack Shah.
13	7	"Mee Loabi"	Shahudha Mahmood	Shahudha Mahmood	Ahmed Zifaaf	February 12, 2024
Affan and Minha, a married couple, are struggling with a troubled relationship. Affan becomes suspicious that Minha is having an affair and secretly follows her, only to find her with another man. When he confronts her, Minha reveals that she already knows about Affan's affair. Realizing their marriage is beyond repair, they both come to terms with the fact that their relationship has ended.
14	8	"Dhey Handhaan"	Shahudha Mahmood	Shahudha Mahmood	Ahmed Zifaaf	February 19, 2024
Shuhan and Riyana, a couple who met through social media dating, enjoy a blissful marriage until frequent arguments strain their bond. Unable to reconcile, Riyana leaves and requests a divorce, which Shuhan reluctantly agrees to. Three months later, Shuhan encounters Riyana again, only to discover she is blind. She confesses she had been diagnosed with conjunctivitis shortly after their marriage but left him, fearing she would become a burden. Despite her revelation that her illness is terminal, Shuhan vows to stay by her side. They share a bittersweet reunion before Riyana’s passing, leaving Shuhan cherishing her memories forever.
15	9	"Dhuruvaan Jehunas"	Ali Shifau	Ahmed Tholal	Ahmed Zifaaf	February 26, 2024
Zaleef is deeply in love with Asra, a married woman, and their secret relationship blossoms in the shadows. Years later, they reunite and reminisce about their shared moments and the love they couldn't fully realize. Asra, now divorced, finally confesses her feelings for Zaleef, only to learns he is already married, leaving their love story permanently incomplete.

== Development ==
On 14 September 2020, on the occasion of Dark Rain Entertainment's fourteenth anniversary, they announced several projects including Dark Rain Chronicles, written and directed by Ali Shifau. Filming for the last episode titled "Nostalgia" commenced on 20 July 2022, which was anticipated to be the pilot episode of the series. During the time, the team announced that the first season will consist of a total of five episodes, later adding another episode to the season. Filming for the second episode titled Fureytha was completed in August 2022.

Filming for the second season commenced in October 2023. Presenter, Shahudha Mahmoodh was reported to rope in to direct two episodes of the second season, out of which the episodes titled "Lemon Cake" was confirmed to be written by Mahmood. Script for this segment was completed in two days.

== Release and reception ==
In August 2022, Dark Rain Entertainment announced that first season consisting six episodes will premiere in October 2022. The series was later pushed for a November release. The first episode of the series titled "Assalaam Alaikum" was released on 12 November 2022 through Baiskoafu. The six episodes of the first season received positive reviews from critics.

The first series focuses on six stories of ultimate revenge. The first episode titled Assalaam Alaikum featuring Adam Rizwee and Sharaf Abdulla, follows a protective son avenging a scammer for the death of his mother. The second episode titled Fureytha features Aishath Yaadha as a helpless wife committing a heinous crime against her abusive husband. The third episode Rankolhaa focuses on the sensitive child who has been molested by her step-father and her fruitful revenge years later. The fourth episode titled Surprise narrates a manipulative, wealthy businessman and his revenge on his unfaithful wife. The fifth episode titled Party features Ali Shameel as a drug addict father avenging his son's murder while the last episode of the series Nostalgia narrates the vengeance of a person bullied during childhood.
