= Biruveri Vaahaka =

Maldivian web series

- Genre: Horror
- Written by: Ilyas Waheed; Hoodh Ibrahim
- Directed by: Ilyas Waheed
- Music by: Hussain Thaufeeq
- Country of origin: Maldives
- Original language: Divehi
- No. of seasons: 1
- No. of episodes: 15

Production
- Producer: Asim Ali
- Cinematography: Ismail Munawwar
- Editors: Ahmed Ameed; Ahmed Zifaaf; Ilyas Waheed; Ismail Munawwar
- Production company: IFilms

Original release
- Release: June 3 – November 4, 2022

Biruveri Vaahaka is a Maldivian horror thriller anthology web series directed by Ilyas Waheed. The series features an ensemble cast including Ahmed Saeed, Mariyam Azza, Nathasha Jaleel, Nuzuhath Shuaib, Sharaf Abdulla, Aishath Rishmy and Ravee Farooq. Each episode of the series focuses on a separate storyline although the characters from the episodes are interrelated to form the main plot, which revolves around a secretive investigation team trying to undercover a series of supernatural suspected murders.

== Cast and characters ==
Episode 1: Phone Call

- Furugan Mohamed as Ayan
- Hassan Saamih Mohamed as Saamih
- Naajiha Azoor as Jazlee
- Mariyam Shakeela as Muna; Ayan's mother

Episode 2: Lakunu

- Mariyam Waheedha as Dheema
- Aminath Alya Nazeer as Shaan
- Aishath Yalma Nazeer as Jinn Kid
- Fathimath Latheefa as Shaira
- Mohamed Afrah as Rasheed
- Mariyam Shakeela as Muna

Episode 3: Edhun

- Ibrahim Fairooz Adam as Niyaz
- Fathimath Sara Adam as Ziyana
- Thaathi Adam as Saamiya
- Suja Abdulla as Niyaz's neighbor
- Nuzuhath Shuaib as Saba; friend of Niyaz
- Sharaf Abdulla as Azaan; friend of Niyaz
- Nashidha Mohamed as a customer (special appearance)
- Ibrahim Jihad as a customer (special appearance)

Episode 4: Mask

- Mohamed Vishal as Ayya
- Aisha Ali as Lubaa
- Ibrahim Amaan Hussan as Lubaa's husband
- Fathimath Latheefa as Ayya Mom
- Ahmed Sharif as Razeen "Rocky"
- Ibrahim Fairooz Adam as Niyaz
- Hassan Saamih Mohamed as Samih
- Sharaf Abdulla as Azaan
- Hussain Shinan as neighbor
- Aishath Nazeeha as neighbor

Episode 5 and 6: Mas Dhathuru

- Ahmed Sharif as Razeen "Rocky"
- Hussain Haazim (Sandy) as Athoof
- Ali Usam as Zalif "Zedey"
- Ali Nadheeh as Hazif "Happu"
- Aishath Razan Ramiz as Mizu
- Mariyam Azza as Lahoo
- Nathasha Jaleel as Nisha
- Sammah Mohamed as Saif
- Saamee Hussain Didi as Dimaah
- Ahmed Saeed as Zahir
- Mohamed Maahil as young Rocky
- Mariyam Haleem and Rocky's Grandmother

Episode 7: Honeymoon

- Nuzuhath Shuaib as Saba
- Sharaf Abdulla as Azaan
- Ibrahim Soba as Jaleel
- Aminath Rayya Binth Areef as Kid

Episode 8: Jaadhoogar

- Aishath Rishmy as Leesh
- Ahmed Azmeel as Soba
- Ibrahim Soba as Jaleel
- Ahmed Shamaan Nazeer as Niyaz
- Ali Yooshau as Ziyadh
- Nuzuhath Shuaib as Saba
- Sharaf Abdulla as Azaan

Episode 9: Mini

- Mariyam Azza as Lahoo
- Ahmed Saeed as Zahir
- Nathasha Jaleel as Nisha
- Sammah Mohamed as Saif
- Adam Rizwee as Rasheed
- Ahmed Shaihaan as Ismail
- Saamee Hussain Didi as Dimaah
- Ravee Farooq as Qalib (special appearance)
- Mohamed Manik as Yoosuf (special appearance)

Episode 10: Rah

- Aishath Rishmy as Leesh
- Nuzuhath Shuaib as Saba
- Ahmed Asim as Niyaz
- Ali Yooshau as Jaleel
- Sharaf Abdulla as Azaan
- Mariyam Azza as Lahoo
- Ahmed Saeed as Zahir
- Nathasha Jaleel as Nisha

Episode 11: Loabiverin

- Abdulla Muaz as Akram
- Fathimath Visama as Reen
- Ravee Farooq as Qalib
- Mariyam Azza as Lahoo

Episode 12: Foshi

- Nathasha Jaleel as Nisha
- Saamee Hussain Didi as Dimaah
- Mohamed Manik as Yoosuf
- Ahmed Saeed as Zahir
- Ravee Farooq as Qalib
- Mariyam Azza as Lahoo
- Nuzuhath Shuaib as Saba
- Sharaf Abdulla as Azaan

Episode 13: Haajaanu

- Nathasha Jaleel as Nisha
- Saamee Hussain Didi as Dimaah
- Mohamed Manik as Yoosuf
- Ahmed Saeed as Zahir
- Ravee Farooq as Qalib
- Mariyam Azza as Lahoo
- Fathimath Sara Adam as Ziyana
- Aisha Ali as Luba
- Mohamed Vishal as Ayya

== Episodes ==
No.	Title	Directed by	Written by	Original release date
1	"Phone Call"	Ilyas Waheed	Hoodh Ibrahim	June 3, 2022
Ayan, a womanizer breaks off his relationship with Jazlee and moves on to another one. One day, he eats a sweet pudding delivered by his aunt, although warned by his mother, Muna. Soon after, he begins to experience deadly symptoms and receiving mysterious calls from a private number. Saamiu answers one of such calls only to discover that the real culprit is not Ayan's aunt but his love affairs, though Muna is unaware that there is more to this sorcery.
2	"Lakunu"	Ilyas Waheed	Hoodh Ibrahim	June 10, 2022
A struggling single mother, Dheema, battles with her ex-husband, Rasheed (father of Ayan from "Phone Call"), over the custody of their only daughter, Shaan. After a swimming session with her classmates, Shaan returns home, a little unusual than before. Despite the news which follows and the surprising events she witnesses, Dheema returns to her normal life with new acceptance.
3	"Edhun"	Ilyas Waheed	Ilyas Waheed	June 17, 2022
Niyaz, friend of Ayan and Samih (from "Phone Call") an incapable husband domestically abused by his wife, Saamiya, operates and manages a restaurant passed down to his wife, after her father's demise. One night he is introduced to Ziyana, a mysterious woman who claims she can fulfill his darkest desires; Niyaz wishes to "eat" his own wife before she does. Promising his desire be fulfilled, she conditions him to eat a dish she prepares for three nights in a row, which has an adverse effect on his appetite and behavior, ultimately leading to satisfy his desire.
4	"Mask"	Ilyas Waheed	Ilyas Waheed	June 24, 2022
Ayya spends a day at the beach with his friends, Samih, Rocky and Niyaz (from "Edhun") where he finds a creepy looking mask washed up near the shoreline, which fascinates him. There he meets, Luba, and a friendship builds between them. Soon after, unexplainable things start to happen to Ayya, from having a vision of his neighbors' murder through the eyes of the mask. He tries to get rid of the mask but reappears in the bedroom. That night, he wear the mask, not realizing the consequences he has to face.
5	"Mas Dhathuru - Part 1"	Ilyas Waheed	Ilyas Waheed	July 1, 2022
A group of friends, Rocky, Zedey, Happu and Athoof ends a fishing trip with a traumatizing twist, where they lose Happu to sea. Athoof and Zedey believe it is related to supernatural events, which Rocky refuses to discuss about for obvious reasons. Journalist and blogger, Nisha, determines to dig the recent chain of events including Happu's disappearance, jeopardizing Zahir's investigation. Rocky starts hallucinating Happu and his friends dying one by one.
6	"Mas Dhathuru - Part 2"	Ilyas Waheed	Ilyas Waheed	July 22, 2022
Rocky's grandmother's recital on a seaworm matches with the current occurrence. Nisha theorizes that all five cases are related and citing the snake-shape earpiece, she deduces that the Jinn in "Lakunu" and "Edhun" are the same but distinct from "Phone Call"; while the rest of the cases are interrelated due to the circle of friends. With the demise of Athoof, Rocky ultimately discloses what he witnessed during the trip to the police investigation team. Afterwards, he is seduced by the sea worm in disguise of his girlfriend into having sex.
7	"Honeymoon"	Ilyas Waheed	Ilyas Waheed	July 29, 2022
Azaan and Saba go on a free Honeymoon trip gifted to them by a friend. They are welcomed by an unfriendly man, Jaleel, with a huge scar on his face, who warns them not to step out of the guest house during midnight. The couple defies his instructions and wanders around the island, unintentionally opening an abandoned box. This has an adverse impact on Saba's life as she completely disappears from the human eyes. Helpless, Azaan goes back to Male' a week later and inform the investigation team of her disappearance.
8	"Jadhoogar"	Ilyas Waheed	Ilyas Waheed	August 5, 2022
A gifted magician, Leesh is celebrated by the nation for her empowerment in the industry yet accused for her involvement in the disappearance of civilians. She is forced to honor a deal which she made with the devil, Jaleel. Leesh gives her best effort to submit his offerings until her ex-husband, Soba interferes. This leads to a huge quarrel between the trio, ultimately Soba making a better deal with Jaleel. As his first customer, Soba offers a free Honeymoon trip to Azaan and Saba ("Honeymoon").
9	"Mini"	Ilyas Waheed	Ilyas Waheed	September 9, 2022
With reports of attacks on the locals by a creature of unknown origin, Nisha and Saif from the investigation team travel to the island to uncover the mystery. While they were walking around the forest, the creature attacks them, ultimately killing Saif. Nisha was luckily speared as she was on her period, and she was able to break the necklace worn by the creature, which helps the team to deduce its origin.
10	"Rah"	Ilyas Waheed	Ilyas Waheed	September 16, 2022
Stranded on a mysterious island, Leesh confronts her demons and tries to find a way to get off the island. As instructed by one of such demons, Qalib, assisted by Saba and accompanied with her friend, Niyaz, Leesh locates the enigmatic box and successfully breaks the curse, burning Jaleel, who has a vile interior motive. Azaan finally reunites with Saba, who is found to be pregnant to their first child, while Leesh searches for Niyaz who is revealed to be her imaginary friend.
11	"Loabiverin"	Ilyas Waheed	Ilyas Waheed	September 23, 2022
An aspiring model, Reen rushes into a taxi, already late for a project shoot. They travel from Villingili ferry terminal to Hulhumalé only for Reen to realize she has to go back home to fetch a costume bag. During their three-hours journey, an irritated Reen debate and discusses horror stories with the strange taxi driver, Akram (ex-boyfriend of Nisha), including that of an ancient tale of two "lovers" who murder people and take their disguise. The journey ends with a twist for Reen as she loses the project and her life too.
12	"Foshi"	Ilyas Waheed	Ilyas Waheed	September 30, 2022
Members of the investigative team onboard a historian, Yoosuf, whose tales and fictions about the demons initially trapped within the box "Foshi", the origin of which remains unknown, match with the recent incidents. Meanwhile, Lahoo, one of the members of the team have been continuously disturbed by the vision and presence of Qalib around her, while another member, Dhimaah is threatened by a voice to handover the box to the unknown. Using Saba as a vessel, Qalib ultimately offers to help the team in trapping the demons and closing the box.
13	"Haajaanu"	Ilyas Waheed	Ilyas Waheed	October 7, 2022
The hunt for the elusive "foshi" intensifies as an entity recruits a member of the team to find it, chaos ensues as the entity tries to create an opening to get to the "foshi".
14	"Feshun"	Ilyas Waheed	Ilyas Waheed	October 28, 2022
15	"Shaithona"	Ilyas Waheed	Ilyas Waheed	November 4, 2022

== Development ==
The project was announced in November 2020, as fifteen-episodes anthology web series. Filming for the web series started in October 2020. A casting call was made by director Ilyas Waheed and an audition was held to launch new faces. In spite of the debut actors, it was reported the series will star prominent actors too. On 28 November 2020, it was reported that the series will star Mohamed Vishal, Fathimath Sara Adam, Mariyam Shakeela and Sharaf Abdulla. On 22 September 2021, it was announced that Aishath Rishmy, Ahmed Azmeel and Ibrahim Sobah has joined the cast for the eight episode of the series. Post production of the series was handed over to Orkeyz Inc, similar to Waheed's previous film ventures including Bavathi (2019) and Nina.

== Soundtrack ==
The promotional song titled "Shaithona", performed by Andhala Haleem was released on 6 May 2022 to positive reviews from critics, with specific mention for its makeup and videography.

Track listing
No.	Title	Lyrics	Music	Singer(s)	Length
1.	"Shaithona"	Ibrahim Niyaz	Ibrahim Affan	Andhala Haleem, Abdulla Sameeu	2:30

== Release and reception ==
In June 2022, it was announced that the series will be officially streamed through DhiraaguTV.

Upon release, the series received positive reviews from critics, where Ahmed Rasheed from MuniAvas wrote: "the whole crew has executed their respective roles to its fullest leading the final project to be flawless". The reviews were directed at the performance of the cast and writer-director Ilyas' creativity for merging horror folklore into an "engaging visual treat".

Apart from the concept, screenplay, performance and direction, the series met extremely positive reviews from critics for its graphic designing and visual effects, especially for the makeup and visual designing for the seaworm portrayed by Aishath Razan Ramiz in the episode 6 titled Mas Dhathuru.
