= Karu Hakuru =

Maldivian television sitcom

- Genre: Sitcom
- Created by: Orkeyz Inc
- Written by: Mahdi Ahmed
- Directed by: Mohamed Munthasir
- Starring: Raufath Sadiq; Lamha Latheef; Hussain Nazim; Ali Azim; Aisha Ali
- Theme music composer: Munaz
- Opening theme: "Karu Hakuru" (by Lamha Latheef)
- Country of origin: Maldives
- Original language: Dhivehi
- No. of seasons: 3
- No. of episodes: 36

Production
- Executive producer: Ahmed Sajid
- Producer: Baiskoafu
- Running time: 17–24 minutes (per episode)
- Production company: Okeyz Inc

Original release
- Network: Baiskoafu
- Release: March 12, 2019 – January 13, 2021

Karu Hakuru is a Maldivian television sitcom, created by Mohamed Munthasir, which streams on Baiskoafu from 12 March 2019. With a cast starring Raufath Sadiq, Lamha Latheef, Hussain Nazim, Ali Azim and Aisha Ali, the show explores the day to day challenges of the lives of a young family. The series was produced by Basikoafu Studio, in association with Okeyz Inc.

== Cast ==
=== Main ===
- Raufath Sadiq as Naaif Rasheed
- Aminath Lamha Latheef as Liusha
- Hussain Nazim as Ahmed Rasheed
- Ali Azim as Zack
- Aisha Ali as Leeza

=== Recurring ===
- Mohamed Afrah as Rah Kudey
- Mohamed Hisam Afeef as Mia

=== Guest ===
- Raufa Rasheed Hussain (Episode: "Match")
- Aishath Shahudhaa Rasheed (Episode: "Kurafi")
- Mohamed Jumayyil (Episode: "Nubai Buri" and "Ten Ants")
- Mariyam Ashfa (Episode: "Nightingale")
- Ali Seezan (Episode: "Ten Ants")
- Ahmed Sunie (Episode: "Gudi")
- Maria Teresa Pagano (Episode: "Dhon Bitu")
- Meynaa Hassan (Episode: "Keyolhu")
- Moosa Waseem (Episode: "Baby")
- Ahmed Nimal as Liusha's father (Episode: "Baby")

== Episodes ==
=== Season 1 ===
No. overall	No. in season	Title	Directed by	Original release date
1	1	"Keyo"	Mohamed Munthasir	March 12, 2019
Rasheed (Hussain Nazim), a diabetic patient and a father of two children, is advised to avoid sugar consumption including bananas. Liusha (Lamha Latheef) suspects someone is eating bananas at midnight and Zack (Ali Azim) believes that apartment is infested with rats. Naaif (Raufath Sadiq) and Zack use rat bait but fail to catch any. The next day, Leeza (Aisha Ali) reads on the internet that people with diabetes can actually eat bananas, and Rasheed is revealed to be the "rat" eating all the bananas.
2	2	"Vai Golhi"	Mohamed Munthasir	March 15, 2019
One night, Liusha, Naaif, Zack and Leeza have a horror movie marathon. As the show ends, everyone goes to their rooms, except for Zack who crashes on the sofa, afraid to leave the apartment. Later that night, he wakes up to a haunting voice from the vent which keeps communicating with him. He rushes into Naaif's room while the couple move to sitting room, unable to sleep due to Naaif's loud snoring. The following morning, Rasheed meets Rah Kudey (Mohamed Afrah), their new neighbor, who is revealed to be the one trying to communicate with Zack.
3	3	"Match"	Mohamed Munthasir	March 19, 2019
Naaif, Liusha and Zack play hide and seek. Zack, while hiding behind the sofa, overhears a conversation between Rasheed and Rah Kuday which implies how much Rasheed has lost in life, as a widower. Zack suggests that Naaif search for a companion for his father. The trio works on alternative plans to find the best match for Rasheed.
4	4	"Kurafi"	Mohamed Munthasir	March 22, 2019
A toilet renovation in Rah Kuday's apartment releases cockraoches into Rasheed's apartment. The whole family goes into a frenzy while trapped in a cockroach infestation in their apartment. Zack miserably fails in flirting with the representative from Pest Service.
5	5	"Addict"	Mohamed Munthasir	March 26, 2019
Naaif on a daily routine practices yoga poses which requires extensive space from the living room. Zack brings a PS4 for Liu to play Fortnite which turns into addiction for Naaif.
6	6	"Party"	Mohamed Munthasir	April 2, 2019
Zack mistakes the tumble dryer function in the washing machine with tumbler dry, and decides to wash the dishes using the washing machine. Their housekeeper, Mia (Mohamed Hisam Afeef), asks a favour from Liusha to groom him for a party for which she seeks help from the unssuportive Naaif and Zack.
7	7	"Period"	Mohamed Munthasir	April 9, 2019
8	8	"Nubai Buri"	Mohamed Munthasir	April 16, 2019
9	9	"Snap"	Mohamed Munthasir	April 23, 2019
10	10	"Born Day"	Mohamed Munthasir	April 30, 2019
11	11	"Nukuni"	Mohamed Munthasir	May 7, 2019
12	12	"Nightingale"	Mohamed Munthasir	May 14, 2019

=== Season 2 ===
No. overall	No. in season	Title	Directed by	Original release date
13	1	"Moving"	Mohamed Munthasir	August 10, 2019
14	2	"Ten Ants"	Mohamed Munthasir	August 17, 2019
15	3	"Nightmare"	Mohamed Munthasir	August 24, 2019
16	4	"Gudi"	Mohamed Munthasir	August 31, 2019
17	5	"Dhon Bitu"	Mohamed Munthasir	September 7, 2019
18	6	"Twin Package"	Mohamed Munthasir	September 14, 2019
19	7	"Keyolhu"	Mohamed Munthasir	September 21, 2019
20	8	"Bagey"	Mohamed Munthasir	September 21, 2019
21	9	"Roboman"	Mohamed Munthasir	October 5, 2019
22	10	"Bangkok"	Mohamed Munthasir	October 12, 2019
23	11	"Viyafaari"	Mohamed Munthasir	October 19, 2019
24	12	"Baby"	Mohamed Munthasir	October 26, 2019

=== Season 3 ===
No. overall	No. in season	Title	Directed by	Original release date
25	1	"Anand"	Mohamed Munthasir	October 28, 2020
26	2	"Lockdown"	Mohamed Munthasir	November 4, 2020
27	3	"Extension"	Mohamed Munthasir	November 11, 2020
28	4	"Renovation"	Mohamed Munthasir	November 18, 2020
29	5	"Positive"	Mohamed Munthasir	November 25, 2020
30	6	"Bamboo Stick"	Mohamed Munthasir	December 2, 2020
31	7	"Plant Life"	Mohamed Munthasir	December 9, 2020
32	8	"Working Space"	Mohamed Munthasir	December 16, 2020
33	9	"Guarding Treacle"	Mohamed Munthasir	December 23, 2020
34	10	"Plant Shop"	Mohamed Munthasir	December 30, 2020
35	11	"Lockdown Ease"	Mohamed Munthasir	January 6, 2021
36	12	"Out of Tune"	Mohamed Munthasir	January 13, 2021

== Production ==
On 15 February 2019, Baiskoafu announced the first Maldivian sitcom, titled Karu Hakuru. An interactive campaign was initiated by Okeyz Inc and Baiskoafu with several taglines for generating a marketing exposure to the series. In March 2019, the star cast including Raufath Sadiq, Lamha Latheef, Hussain Nazim, Ali Azim and Aisha Ali was revealed.

== Soundtrack ==
Track listing
No.	Title	Lyrics	Music	Singer(s)	Length
1.	"Karu Hakuru"	Mohamed Munthasir	Munaz	Lamha Latheef

== Release and response ==
The series was premiered on 12 March 2019 by Musthafa Hussain, in an event which aired the first episode of the series. A new episode of the series was released for streaming at 2100 of every Tuesday. The pilot episode "Keyo" was viewed by more than 3,000 users at the time of release.

The series opened to mostly positive reviews from critics where specific praise was attributed to Lamha Latheef's performance. Aishath Maaha from Dho called Latheef to be "outstanding" from the cast with her "natural and authetic" performance. Maaha opined that Raufath Sadiq as a newcomer "shines" in the comedy role along with Ali Azim, though Hussain Nazim and Aishath need to improve their dialogue delivery".
