= Giritee Loabi =

Maldivian web series

- Opening sequence
- Screenplay by: Ahmed Zareer
- Directed by: Ali Shifau
- Country of origin: Maldives
- Original language: Divehi
- No. of seasons: 1
- No. of episodes: 20

Production
- Executive producers: Ahmed Sinan; Ahmed Tholal
- Producers: Aishath Fuwad Thaufeeq; Mohamed Ali
- Cinematography: Ali Shifau
- Editor: Ali Shifau
- Production company: Dark Rain Entertainment

Original release
- Release: December 7, 2021 – May 2, 2022

Giritee Loabi is a Maldivian romantic comedy drama web series written by Ahmed Zareer and directed by Ali Shifau. It stars Mohamed Manik, Aminath Rashfa, Mohamed Vishal and Adam Rizwee in main roles. The pilot episode of the series was released on 7 December 2021.

== Cast and characters ==
=== Main ===
- Mohamed Manik as Sattaru
- Aminath Rashfa as Noora
- Mohamed Vishal as Faizan
- Adam Rizwee as Ashraf

=== Recurring ===
- Ahmed Saeed as Faiz
- Hamdhoon Farooq as Lamman
- Aisha Ali as Fathun
- Ummu as Hajja
- Mohamed Faisal as Umaru
- Ahmed Sharif as Sharaf
- Mariyam Majudha as Naaz
- Ahmed Shakir as Shaazly
- Mohamed Shivaz as Ilyas
- Hamdhan Farooq as Mahdy; Naaz's boss
- Mohamed Afrah as Sattaru's boss
- Ali Shazleem as Rasheed

=== Guest ===
- Ali Nadheeh as Irushad; Faizan's friend (Episode 10)
- Ali Shameel as Faheem; Faizan's landlord (Episode 14)
- Aminath Shaana as a customer (Episode 15)
- Ahmed Easa as a doctor (Episode 15)
- Ibrahim Shiyaz as Ibrahim (Episode 18)
- Sheela Najeeb as Shaira (Episode 22)
- Mariyam Haleem as Zubeydha (Episode 22)
- Mohamed Rifshan as Masoodh (Episode 22)
- Fensir Ibbe
- Aminath Sham
- Niusha
- Azmee Adam Naseer

== Episodes ==
No.	Title	Directed by	Original release date
1	"Ekeh"	Ali Shifau	December 7, 2021
Noora, the only child of a Sattaru attempts to convince her boyfriend, Faizan, who works at a private firm, to get approval from her father with regard to their relationship, while her supervisor, Ashraf is flattered with her beauty.
2	"Dheyh"	Ali Shifau	December 7, 2021
Faizan is too reticent in front of Sattaru which disappoints Noora, though she agrees to give him one last chance to prove his courageousness. Sattaru is threatened by his supervisor, Ihusan, of losing his job since he fails to adapt to the technological advancement. Ultimately, the company offers him a job at Addu City, which further concerns him.
3	"Thineh"	Ali Shifau	December 14, 2021
Ashraf convinces Sattaru into believing that the hatred towards him at workplace is attributed to the Messi–Ronaldo rivalry. Sattaru leave is approved by Ihusan.
4	"Hathareh"	Ali Shifau	December 21, 2021
Lamman catches her wife having an affair with her boss, Sharaf which she ultimately outsmarts him for his lack of responsibility.
5	"Faheh"	Ali Shifau	December 28, 2021
Faizan is officially introduced to the family while Ashraf tries to intervene in their relationship.
6	"Hayeh"	Ali Shifau	January 4, 2022
Naaz and Shaazly, brother of Ashraf, are a newly wedded couple but Naaz has to fulfil her promise to her father; halt their intimate relationship until she repays his loan, which would take approximate seven years for full settlement. Meanwhile, Faizan and Noora has a difficulty in convincing Sattaru to agree for their marriage.
7	"Hatheh"	Ali Shifau	January 11, 2022
Sattaru ultimately decides to get-to-know Faizan personally before making any decision.
8	"Asheh"	Ali Shifau	January 18, 2022
An attempt by Faizan to impress Sattaru fails as Ashraf turns the table around, against him. Sattaru requests Ashraf to spy on Faizan. Ashraf appoints his brother Shaazly to act as a gangster, in an attempt to frame Faizan for his involvement in gang.
9	"Nuvaeh"	Ali Shifau	January 25, 2022
Fearing the outcome of his plan, Ashraf decides to conceal his fabricated evidences.
10	"Dhihaeh"	Ali Shifau	February 1, 2022
Faizan is forced to watch a football match with Ashraf and Sattaru. Faizan fears his job security as Umar decides to join a permanent job.
11	"Egaara"	Ali Shifau	February 8, 2022
A conversation with Ilyas triggers Ashraf on using black magic to attain the love of Noora.
12	"Baara"	Ali Shifau	February 15, 2022
13	"Theyra"	Ali Shifau	February 22, 2022
14	"Saadha"	Ali Shifau	March 1, 2022
15	"Fanara"	Ali Shifau	March 8, 2022
16	"Soalha"	Ali Shifau	March 15, 2022
17	"Sathaara"	Ali Shifau	March 22, 2022
18	"Ashaara"	Ali Shifau	March 29, 2022
19	"Navaara"	Ali Shifau	April 5, 2022
20	"Vihi"	Ali Shifau	April 12, 2022

== Development ==
The project was officially announced on 11 July 2021 on Dark Rain Entertainment's Facebook page. Filming for the series commenced in August 2021 with the actors, Mohamed Vishal, Aminath Rashfa, Mohamed Manik, Mohamed Faisal and Adam Rizwee. Filming was completed in October 2021.

== Soundtrack ==
Track listing
No.	Title	Lyrics	Music	Singer(s)	Length
1.	"Dheefa"	Fathuhulla Abdul Faththaah	Fathuhulla Abdul Faththaah	Fathuhulla Abdul Faththaah	4:27
2.	"Mithuruge Raanee"	Ali Aimon			3:53

== Release and reception ==
On 22 September 2021, Dark Rain Entertainment announced that the series will be premiered digitally on Baiskoafu at the end of year. The first episode of the series was initially slated to release on 20 November 2021, which was later pushed to premiere on 7 December 2021.
