= Yaaraa =

Maldivian web series

- Written by: Ahmed Iqbal
- Directed by: Aishath Rishmy
- Starring: Aminath Rasheedha; Aishath Rishmy; Mariyam Azza; Ahmed Azmeel; Mohamed Vishal
- Narrated by: Aminath Namza; Inayath Ali; Aishath Shahufa; Aishath Shiranee
- Music by: Abdul Basith; Hussain Thaufeeq
- Country of origin: Maldives
- Original language: Divehi
- No. of seasons: 4
- No. of episodes: 50

Production
- Executive producers: Mohamed Mirusan; Abdulla Hafiz
- Producer: Aishath Rishmy
- Cinematography: Samaah Ibrahim
- Editor: Aishath Rishmy
- Production company: R2Z Productions

Original release
- Release: April 24, 2023 – November 11, 2024

Yaaraa is a Maldivian romantic comedy drama web series produced and directed by Aishath Rishmy. It features an ensemble cast including Aminath Rasheedha, Aishath Rishmy, Mariyam Azza, Ahmed Azmeel, Mohamed Vishal, Ismail Jumaih, Fathimath Sara Adam, Hussain Shadhyaan, Mariyam Waheedha and Nuzuhath Shuaib in main roles. The pilot episode of the series was released on 24 April 2023.

Written by Ahmed Iqbal, the series revolves around polar opposite lives of two sisters who are faced with the reality of relationships. The entirety of the series focuses on the hardships that teach the siblings what it takes to make and break the bond of a lifetime. This film stands as a remarkable achievement in Maldivian cinema, marking the highest number of actors ever featured in a film production, featuring over ninety actors in different roles.

== Cast and characters ==
=== Main ===
- Aishath Rishmy as Raayaa; the eldest daughter of Zainab and a die-hard fan of Shah Rukh Khan. Ambitious and driven, she sees her life as a fairytale waiting to unfold. Raaya embodies empowerment, balancing her aspirations with a deep commitment to her family, making her a strong and family-oriented woman.
- Mariyam Azza as Shaayaa; youngest child of Zainab, a highly maintained social media influencer and a successful model.
- Ahmed Azmeel as Shinaan Rasheed; the ambitious and family-oriented husband of Raaya. As the eldest and only son in a family of four, Shinaan carries a strong sense of responsibility and strives to make his mark in the world.
- Mohamed Vishal as Naail; the only son of a wealthy family who is well educated son despite his dream to be a musician. He is also the boyfriend of Shaaya whom he meets through his best friend Zak.
- Ismail Jumaih as Zein Malik; a free-spirited individual who has been married twice and considers marriage as a trial. His professional life mirrors his unconventional approach.
- Fathimath Sara Adam as Zaheena "Zak" Abdul Kareem; a spirited and tomboyish girl who thrives on engaging in thought-provoking arguments. Unafraid to challenge family and societal norms, she defies cultural expectations to embrace her independence and serve as a powerful role model for women.
- Hussain Shadhyaan as Abdul "Kelly" Kaleem; the only child of a wealthy family who thrives on drama and craves attention. With a firm belief that marriage and settling down are not for him, Kelly embraces a lifestyle free from commitment, preferring to explore life's adventures without being tied down.
- Mariyam Waheedha as Riyaasha; the adopted child of Zainab and an unfortunate lover.
- Nuzuhath Shuaib as Aminath Rizwana; the sister of Shinaan and the best friend of Raaya. Rizwana holds a strong belief in arranged marriages and she embraces the idea of finding love through a more traditional approach.
- Ali Seezan as Rafkhan; Raaya's ex-boyfriend.

=== Recurring ===
- Sharaf Abdulla as Eddy; a colleague of Zak
- Nathasha Jaleel as Huya Qasim; Raaya's colleague at gym
- Ahmed Asim as Fayaz; Shinan's best friend who is married to his high school sweetheart Gulfa. He is a womanizer and a narrow minded person.
- Maleeha Waheed as Dhiyana "D"; Shaaya's colleague
- Aminath Rasheedha as Zainab Ahmed; a devoted widow who lost her husband, Shareef, twenty-two years ago. With unwavering dedication, she serves as a loving mother to her two daughters, Raaya and Shaaya.
- Maiha Adam as Hudha Didi; Shaaya's colleague
- Ahmed Ishaar as Sultan Shakir; a wealthy entrepreneur and the boss of Shaaya.
- Aminath Rishfa as Zeyba; a rich and empowered businesswoman
- Mariyam Haleem as Ruqiyya; an elderly woman and a friend of Zainab, who defies societal expectations with her lively spirit and social media prowess. Embracing her unique persona, she sees herself as a brand and enjoys flirting.
- Zuleikha Manike as Sofiyya; an elderly woman and a friend of both Zainab and Ruqiyya, who is more invested in social media appearances and has a history of multiple failed marriages.
- Aisha Ali as Nasha Ali; the love interest of Zein
- Aminath Silna as Rimsha; Shaaya's colleague
- Shaha Adhunaan as Ferlin Samadh; Shaaya's colleague
- Ahmed Abaan as Bunty; Shaaya's colleague
- Aminath Lamha Latheef as Aneesa "Annie" Fahumee (season 2); Shinan's ex-girlfriend.
- Ahmed Sharif as Faruhadh (season 4); Rizwana's fiancé.
- Aishath Gulfa as Gulfa; Fayaz's wife.
- Mohamed Shaif as Farash (season 3); A man from Addu with whom Shaaya has an affair.
- Moosa Aleef as Shinaan's colleague
- Moosa Shinaan as Kokky; Shinaan's colleague

=== Guest ===
- Ali Nadheeh as Haisham; Riyasha's ex-boyfriend
- Ismail Rasheed as Ahmed Shafeeu; Shinaan's boss
- Shahuma Ahmed as Riyaazaa
- Sofiyya Mohamed as Shiyaanaa
- Ahmed Shakir as Iqbal; Huya's third husband
- Hamid Ali as a customer
- Mariyam Shifa as Shifa; Zein's first wife
- Irufana Ibrahim as Zein's second wife
- Aminath Rashfa as Aasha; Zein's third wife
- Ahmed Sunie as photographer
- Ahmed Fizam as Fitte; Shaaya's ex-boyfriend
- Ali Usam as Dhona; Shaaya's ex-boyfriend
- Shimal Hameed as Shimal; Shaaya's ex-boyfriend
- Ibrahim Sobah as Sobah; Raayaa's ex-boyfriend
- Ismail Aziel Azumeel as young Shinaan Rasheed
- Mariyam Ashfa as Sultan's wife
- Ali Azim as Riyaasha's date
- Ahmed Ifnaz Firag as Ifnaz; Huya's first husband
- Ibrahim Ziyau Mohamed as Ziyau; Huya's second husband
- Razeena Thaufeeq as Razee; Shaaya's designer
- Mohamed Ishfan as Ishfan; Riyaasha's date
- Mohamed Abdul Ghanee as an attendee of Zeyba's event
- Bokitos as an attendee of Zeyba's event
- Hassan Irufan as a musician in Zeyba's event
- Maria Teresa Pagano as herself
- Afnan Ibrahim as Afnan; Raaya's gym client
- Aminath Muhusiana as Moonty
- Mohamed Manik as Annie's boyfriend
- Ilyas Waheed as an attendee of a film event
- Abdulla Azman as a gym trainer
- Aminath Aseela as a gym trainer
- Dheena Ahmed as Jerry; Fayaz's customer
- Ahmed Jillian Rashad as G; D's boyfriend
- Mohamed Rasheed as Zeyba's father
- Aminath Shuha as Roxy; Huya's best friend
- Washiya Mohamed as Zara; Shaaya's college friend
- Ahmed Maseeh as Messy; D's first lover
- Mohamed Rifshan as Jailam; a friend of Farash
- Saamee Hussain Didi as wedding designer
- Mohamed Waheed as Zubeir; Naail's father
- Hassan Adam as Kelly's friend
- Mohamed Mamdhooh Ahmed (Myke) as Kelly's friend
- Hussain Anees (Justin) as Kelly's friend
- Ruthba Ahmed as Kelly's friend
- Ansham Mohamed as Kelly's friend
- Ijulaal Ahmed as Kelly's friend
- Aishath Razan Ramiz as Zein's girlfriend
- Shehenaaz Moosa as Zein's girlfriend
- Ahmed Easa as Hudha's boyfriend
- Ahmed Emau as D's boyfriend
- Ali Inaz as Rimsha's husband
- Imad Ali as Ferlin's husband
- Abdulla Muaz
- Sheela Najeeb as Kelly's mother
- Ahmed Saeed as Rafkhan's brother
- Amira Ismail as Raidha; Rafkhan's sister-in-law
- Shanih Ali as a musician
- Thaathi Adam as a host
- Adhuham Layal Qasim as Aasha's boyfriend
- Mohamed Afrah as magistrate
- Ahmed Shareesh as Nasha's boyfriend
- Adam Rizwee as Gulfa's current boyfriend
- Shahudha Mahmoodh as Eddy's girlfriend
- Reeko Moosa Manik as Annie's boyfriend
- Mariyam Nisha
- Aishath Raaisha
- Aishath Laisha Latheef
- Fathimath Raaya
- Nashidha Mohamed
- Abdullah Zaleeshan
- Aishath Yaadha
- Aminath Noora
- Mariyam Shakeela (actress)
- Yoosuf Shafeeu
- Fathimath Azifa
- Niuma Mohamed
- Shaheedha Ahmed
- Gulisthan Mohamed
- Mariyam Shafaza
- Mariyam Majudha
- Shiyaza Mohamed
- Mariyam Lamsa Latheef
- Shaufa Adam

== Episodes ==
=== Series overview ===
Season	Episodes	Originally released		
Season	Episodes	First released	Last released	Network
1	12	April 24, 2023	July 17, 2023	Baiskoafu
2	14	October 5, 2023	January 11, 2024	Baiskoafu
3	12	March 14, 2024	June 6, 2024	Baiskoafu
4	12	August 26, 2024	November 11, 2024	Baiskoafu

=== Season 1 (2023) ===
No. overall	No. in season	Title	Directed by	Original release date
1	1	"Episode 1"	Aishath Rishmy	April 24, 2023
Zainab Ahmed (Aminath Rasheedha) a devoted widow who lost her husband, Shareef, twenty-two years ago, is excited for the wedding of her eldest daughter, Raaya (Aishath Rishmy), a die-hard Shah Rukh Khan fan and Shinaan (Ahmed Azmeel), an ambitious family-driven man. The wedding is attended by several of their friends, family members and colleagues.
2	2	"Episode 2"	Aishath Rishmy	May 1, 2023
Three months after the wedding, Raaya and Shinaan lives their fairytale life, while her friend, Kelly and Huya believe its temporary. Shaaya is proud of her boyfriend, Naail (Mohamed Vishal), the only son of a wealthy family who is restrained by his parents' plans. Meanwhile, Zak (Fathimath Sara Adam), a spirited, independent woman and the best friend of Naail empowers him to chase his dream to be a musician.
3	3	"Episode 3"	Aishath Rishmy	May 8, 2023
Zainab, her youngest daughter, Shaaya (Mariyam Azza) convince Raaya to chase her dream and sideline her responsibilities towards her family and instead focuses on her husband. Naail's friend, Zein (Ismail Jumaih), a free-spirited individual tries to brainwash Naail into believing that Shaaya is a bad influence on him.
4	4	"Episode 4"	Aishath Rishmy	May 15, 2023
Six months after the wedding, Raayaa feels drained in their relationship due to the minimal efforts from Shinaan. The siblings and friends prepare for Zainab's birthday celebration.
5	5	"Episode 5"	Aishath Rishmy	May 22, 2023
Kelly exacerbates the growing divide between Raayaa and Shinaan by highlighting Shinaan's perceived irresponsibility, while Rizwana adds to the tension with her traditional perspective. Sulthan attempts to influence Shaaya by emphasizing Naail's immaturity, yet Shaaya remains unfazed and unaffected by his opinions.
6	6	"Episode 6"	Aishath Rishmy	May 29, 2023
Zak conceals her true emotions for Naail, while Riyaasha grapples with the complexities of her relationship with a married man, Haisham. Despite her friends' disapproval, Riyaasha finds solace in this connection, as it alleviates her sense of loneliness. On the other hand, Zein embarks on a new romantic journey with Nasha, a single cashier at a perfume store, who recently ended a decade-long relationship with her ex-boyfriend.
7	7	"Episode 7"	Aishath Rishmy	June 5, 2023
Shaaya and Zak clash over workloads, while Raaya and Shinaan argue about family responsibilities but reconcile thanks to Rizwana's advice. In the midst of these conflicts, Kelly feels neglected among friends. Zein reassures Naail about Shaaya's happiness in their relationship.
8	8	"Episode 8"	Aishath Rishmy	June 12, 2023
Shaaya is troubled by her conflict with Zak but struggles to admit her mistake. Shinaan attempts to have a candid conversation with Raaya, but she becomes defensive. Meanwhile, Zein begins dating Nasha as they get to know each other better, while Zak starts socializing with a new colleague named Eddy.
9	9	"Episode 9"	Aishath Rishmy	June 19, 2023
Raaya and Kelly reconcile, and Shaaya and Zak celebrate the renewal of their friendship. During a conversation, Naail candidly shares his first impression of Shaaya, which surprises her as it differs from her own initial opinion.
10	10	"Episode 10"	Aishath Rishmy	July 3, 2023
Zein is eager to fast-track their marriage plans, but Nasha prefers to delay until they know each other better. Shaaya plans a birthday celebration for Naail. While attending an event organized by the accomplished businesswoman Zeyba, Raaya find herself discussing Rafkhan, one of Raaya's past romantic interests.
11	11	"Episode 11"	Aishath Rishmy	July 10, 2023
The group of friends and family embarks on a picnic outing. During the picnic, Shaaya is engrossed in taking portraits, while Raaya and Shinaan have a minor dispute over responsibilities. Ruqiyya and Sofiyya are occupied creating TikToks. Meanwhile, Kelly appears to be developing feelings for Zak but is too shy to express them openly.
12	12	"Episode 12"	Aishath Rishmy	July 17, 2023
Shinaan plans an anniversary celebration with the assistance of Raaya's friends, which ends up causing some discontent with Raaya. Their disagreement escalates throughout the night, resulting in Raaya deciding to move out of the house.

=== Season 2 (2023–2024) ===
No. overall	No. in season	Title	Directed by	Original release date
13	1	"Episode 13"	Aishath Rishmy	October 5, 2023
Raaya and Kelly engage in spying on Shinaan and become increasingly perturbed when Shinaan behaves surprisingly normal, attending work as if nothing unusual had happened. The rest of their friends gather to discuss how to resolve the situation. Shinaan's boss, Ahmed Shafeeu, expresses his dissatisfaction with the team's performance, resulting in a heated confrontation. Both Shinaan and Raaya allow their stubbornness to take the lead. Meanwhile, Naail begins experiencing disturbing dreams involving Shaaya and her boss, Sultan, in compromising situations.
14	2	"Episode 14"	Aishath Rishmy	October 12, 2023
Raaya and Shinan grapple with a profound sense of loneliness and emptiness in their lives. Zeyba expresses her dissatisfaction with the slow progress of the penthouse design and construction, a project led by Shinan's team. Fayaz seizes the moment to inform Zeyba about the ongoing marital issues between Shinan and Raaya. Meanwhile, Ferlin subtly criticizes Shaaya, suggesting that Sultan favors her over others, leading to some tension among the group.
15	3	"Episode 15"	Aishath Rishmy	October 19, 2023
Shinan's ex-girlfriend, Annie, joins Raaya's gym, making Raaya feel insecure. Zainab attempts to reconcile Raaya and Shinan during a family lunch, but it ends in a heated argument, leading Shinan to leave. Shaaya advises Raaya to reconsider and reunite with Shinan, but Raaya has a different opinion.
16	4	"Episode 16"	Aishath Rishmy	October 26, 2023
Shinan reaches a point where he's ready to give up on his marriage with Raaya. Nasha, curious about Zein's past marriages, questions whether she truly understands his reasons for divorce. Ferlin takes a jab at Shaaya, insinuating an affair with Sultan and questioning the management's decision to award her as the best employee. Sultan helps Shaaya with a wardrobe issue and subtly suggests that Naail is possessive and manipulative, trying to influence her perspective.
17	5	"Episode 17"	Aishath Rishmy	November 2, 2023
Rizwana attempts to mediate between Raaya and Shinan, but their discussions lead to no resolution. Shaaya advises Naail not to be jealous of Sultan, trying to reassure him. Naail, concerned about Zein's relationship with Nasha, arranges to meet her to discuss the way forward. Eddy and Zak open up to each other, sharing stories about their families and past romantic relationships.
18	6	"Episode 18"	Aishath Rishmy	November 9, 2023
Following Rizwana and Fayaz's advice, Shinan joins Raaya's gym, but his efforts are hindered by Annie. Despite attempts to repair their relationship, the couple struggles to find a solution. Nasha, having reservations about her relationship with Zein due to their differing perspectives, decides to give it another try.
19	7	"Episode 19"	Aishath Rishmy	November 16, 2023
The relationship advice from their friends proves ineffective in resolving Raaya and Shinan's issues. Meanwhile, Raaya starts talking and seeing her ex-boyfriend Rafkhan, much to Rizwana's disappointment. Sultan attempts to influence Shaaya by comparing his vision for her with Naail's efforts to support her dreams. Zak hesitates to progress further in her relationship with Eddy, fearing potential heartbreak.
20	8	"Episode 20"	Aishath Rishmy	November 30, 2023
The episode kicks off with relationship conflicts: Raaya prioritizing Rafkhan over Shinan, Shaaya neglecting Sultan to focus on her treatment with Naail, and Zak navigating her recent relationship with Eddy alongside her enduring love for Naail and the unrequited affection from Kelly. Meanwhile, Rafkhan attempts to reassure Raaya that Shinan is safe from Anny's influence.
21	9	"Episode 21"	Aishath Rishmy	December 7, 2023
Ferlin takes another jab at Shaaya, but she gives a befitting reply. Shaaya introduces Naail and Zein to D, who is going through a breakup. Later, Shaaya and her friends gear up for Naail's birthday celebration. Shinan and Raaya engage in a normal and casual conversation without any conflict.
22	10	"Episode 22"	Aishath Rishmy	December 14, 2023
Shaaya's appointment as the brand ambassador of the gym creates a challenging situation for Anny with the new customer clientele. Shaaya organizes an elegant and grand birthday celebration, attended by close friends and their partners. Nasha delivers a reality check to Zein about his small-mindedness and treatment of others, ending their relationship due to her fear of attachment. The day concludes with Naail celebrating his birthday with Zak in their traditional style.
23	11	"Episode 23"	Aishath Rishmy	December 21, 2023
Raayaa overhears Anny planning a trip to Maafushi with Shinan, prompting her to join Shaaya and friends on the island to spy on them. Zein receives a reality check for her bullying behavior. Raayaa disrupts Shinan and Anny's private dinner, and Annya suggests to Shinan that he should consider divorcing Raayaa and moving on with his life.
24	12	"Episode 24"	Aishath Rishmy	December 28, 2023
Anny confirms to Raayaa that she is not in a relationship with Shinan. Despite Raayaa believing her narrative, her close friends hold different opinions. Shaayaa boasts about Sultan's wealth, causing discomfort for Naail. Nasha decides to break up with Zein.
25	13	"Episode 25"	Aishath Rishmy	January 4, 2024
As everyone celebrates Eid, the festive atmosphere provides an opportunity for Raayaa and Shinan to delve deeper into their marital issues. Meanwhile, Naail confides in Zak about his plan to propose to Shaayaa, eliciting mixed emotions from Zak.
26	14	"Episode 26"	Aishath Rishmy	January 11, 2024
Shaaya calls out Sulthan for showing off his wealth, leaving him speechless. Zak and Eddy open up about their insecurities and share an emotional embrace. Raaya plans a romantic dinner for Shinan, but he gets stuck in a meeting, disappointing her.

=== Season 3 (2024) ===
No. overall	No. in season	Title	Directed by	Original release date
27	1	"Episode 27"	Aishath Rishmy	March 14, 2024
Zein surprises everyone by volunteering to plan Shaaya and Naail's wedding and seeks Naail's advice on keeping a girl happy. Raaya stays resolute about ignoring Shinan, while Shinan grows closer to his client, Zeyba.
28	2	"Episode 28"	Aishath Rishmy	March 21, 2024
D breaks up with her boyfriend, feeling controlled by her insecurities, and starts dating Zein. Huya introduces Raaya to Roxy, helping her see relationships in a new, positive light. Meanwhile, Shaaya begins to feel overwhelmed with the approaching wedding.
29	3	"Episode 29"	Aishath Rishmy	March 28, 2024
Gulfa ends things with Fayaz after discovering his extramarital affairs. D keeps her relationship private to secure business opportunities. Raaya grows closer to her ex, Rafkhan, but their reunion disappoints Rizwana, who feels dragged into the situation.
30	4	"Episode 30"	Aishath Rishmy	April 4, 2024
Naail grows anxious over Shaaya’s lack of excitement about their wedding. Zak confronts Shaaya, who confides in her about her fears, and Zak urges Shaaya to share them with Naail. Meanwhile, Zein feels insecure about meeting D’s high standards for her boyfriends.
31	5	"Episode 31"	Aishath Rishmy	April 11, 2024
Shaaya’s promotion to Chief of Marketing upsets Ferlin, stirring tension in the team. She discovers Sulthan arranged to join her Germany trip and lashes out at him publicly. D ends things with Zein after he criticizes her for traveling with a male colleague. Rizwana clashes with Raaya and Kelly over their differing views on relationships and marriage.
32	6	"Episode 32"	Aishath Rishmy	April 18, 2024
Shaaya meets Farash during an office trip to Maafushi, and their bond grows as they share a midnight ride. Raaya defends her relationships with Rafkhan and Shinan to Rizwana. After his breakup, Zein reverts to his old self, mocking others' choices and preferences.
33	7	"Episode 33"	Aishath Rishmy	April 25, 2024
Naail enlists his friends and Raaya to secretly plan the wedding as a surprise for Shaaya. Meanwhile, Shaaya grows closer to Farash during her trip, gaining a new perspective on life through his eyes. Raaya reflects on her early days with Shinan, reminiscing about their relationship before marriage.
34	8	"Episode 34"	Aishath Rishmy	May 2, 2024
The friend circle grows anxious over Shaaya’s changed behavior after her Maafushi trip. Feeling guilty about her brief affair with Farash, Shaaya confides in Hudha. Meanwhile, Zeyba opens up to Shinan about her past marriage.
35	9	"Episode 35"	Aishath Rishmy	May 9, 2024
Kelly decorates his place for his birthday party, where Raaya introduces Rafkhan to the group as a close friend. Later, Kelly celebrates privately with Zak, opening up about his vulnerabilities. Meanwhile, Farash visits Malé and asks Shaaya to meet him, hoping to rekindle their connection from Maafushi.
36	10	"Episode 36"	Aishath Rishmy	May 16, 2024
Shaaya meets Farash again. She struggles to overcome her guilt, while Raaya urges her to confess everything to Naail. The friends organize a bridal shower for Shaaya, perfectly matching her dreams. Meanwhile, Kelly voices his support for Raaya’s relationship with Rafkhan over Shinan.
37	11	"Episode 37"	Aishath Rishmy	May 23, 2024
Huya and Kelly urge Raaya to make a firm decision about her relationships. Despite Hudha and Raaya’s advice, Shaaya chooses to keep her affair hidden from Naail. Zeyba confesses her love to Shinan and asks him to move abroad with her, but he refuses.
38	12	"Episode 38"	Aishath Rishmy	June 6, 2024
Both Rafkhan and Shinan plan separate birthday celebrations for Raaya, each hoping to win her affection. Shaaya tries to return to her old self, but the guilt of her affair constantly haunts her. She finally opens up to Farash about her feelings for him and Naail, which deeply disappoints Farash. Meanwhile, Rafkhan admits he’s still in love with Raaya, and as they share a tender moment, Shinan sees Raaya kiss Rafkhan on the cheek, shattering his heart. Raaya lashes out at Kelly, accusing him of setting up a drama to help her make a decision, though his intention was simply to support her through her indecisiveness.

=== Season 4 (2024) ===
No. overall	No. in season	Title	Directed by	Original release date
39	1	"Episode 39"	Aishath Rishmy	August 26, 2024
Raaya and Kelly reconcile, with Kelly admitting his crush on Zak but feeling too insecure to act on it. Shinan assumes Raaya would be happier with Rafkhan and begins to withdraw. Shaaya and Naail get engaged, with Shaaya’s over-excitement for the wedding even surprising Naail. Raaya and Shinan travel to Laamu for Rizwana’s wedding, where Rafkhan urges Raaya to mend her relationship with Shinan. Meanwhile, Zak, knowing about Shaaya’s affair with Farash, starts behaving differently with Eddy, leaving him puzzled.
40	2	"Episode 40"	Aishath Rishmy	August 29, 2024
In an unexpected turn, Zein and Riyaasha begin to bond. Raaya and Shinan’s conversations constantly spiral into arguments, prompting them to pretend to be a newly married couple until their departure. Meanwhile, Shaaya focuses on fulfilling Naail’s bucket list, determined to make him happy.
41	3	"Episode 41"	Aishath Rishmy	September 5, 2024
Eddy chooses to adapt, knowing Zak will always prioritize Naail. Meanwhile, Naail is overjoyed to see Shaaya’s newfound maturity as she works to fulfill all his dreams.
42	4	"Episode 42"	Aishath Rishmy	September 12, 2024
Noticing a significant change in Shaaya’s behavior, Zein grows suspicious that she’s hiding something. During a conversation, the truth about her affair slips out from Zak. She becomes uncertain about her relationship with Eddy. Meanwhile, Rizwana is engaged to Faruhadh, and Raaya’s bond with Shinan begins to improve.
43	5	"Episode 43"	Aishath Rishmy	September 19, 2024
Zein tries to reveal the truth to Naail but hesitates at the last moment. Azza meets Jailam, a friend of Farash, and feels uneasy around him. Zak and Shaaya discuss how Zak should navigate the complicated situation. During Shaaya's bridal shower, a game the friends play intensifies her guilt about her affair.
44	6	"Episode 44"	Aishath Rishmy	September 26, 2024
Raaya discovers Shinan’s struggle with his father’s loan, realizing the financial burden he quietly shouldered. Rizwana and Faruhadh tie the knot, vowing eternal commitment, while Kelly surprises everyone at the wedding, reconciling with Rizwana. Shinan and Raaya share a heartfelt moment, reminiscing about their happy memories and apologizing for their mistakes. However, during his confession, Shinan briefly mentions his affair with Zeyba, leaving Raaya deeply upset.
45	7	"Episode 45"	Aishath Rishmy	October 3, 2024
Naail asks Zein to clarify his feelings with Riyasha and avoid giving her false hope. Eddy and Zak face growing troubles, with Zak deciding to end their relationship due to her unhappiness. Shinan pushes to rekindle his relationship with Raaya, but she believes it’s futile. Meanwhile, everything seems fine between Naail and Shaaya until Naail stumbles upon her conversation with Farash, shaking their bond.
46	8	"Episode 46"	Aishath Rishmy	October 17, 2024
Naail is devastated to learn that Zak hid the truth from him, but she confronts him about his unreasonable expectations as a friend. Zak urges Shaaya to give Naail space to process everything and decide on his own terms. While Zainab tries to comfort Shaaya, Raaya reveals the story of her divorce. As relationships unravel, a new one blooms as Zein and Riyasha grow closer.
47	9	"Episode 47"	Aishath Rishmy	October 17, 2024
Shinan acknowledges his mistakes and decides that staying separated from Raaya is best for both of them. Hudha doubts Naail will return to Shaaya, but Shaaya clings to hope. Naail, however, cancels all payments and wedding plans, leaving Shaaya heartbroken. Raaya and Rafkhan reminisce about their past love and what went wrong between them. When Zainab sees them together, she blames their connection for the failure of Raaya's marriage.
48	10	"Episode 48"	Aishath Rishmy	October 31, 2024
Two weeks pass, and Naail is still grappling with Shaaya’s betrayal, choosing to focus on himself instead. Raaya encourages Kelly to confess his love for Zak, but he hesitates, fearing rejection. Zeyba feels used by Shinan but, honoring her previous offer, still extends the promised job to him. Fayaz asks Gulfa for a fresh start but hopes to remain friends if she cannot forgive him. Sultan mocks Shaaya for rejecting his past offer, but she stands resolute in her life choices. Raaya and Shaaya share a heartfelt conversation, finding solace in each other’s support.
49	11	"Episode 49"	Aishath Rishmy	September 7, 2024
As the friends' dreams and aspirations begin to take shape, their relationships remain uncertain. Zainab offers her thoughts but allows Raaya to make her own decisions. Naail focuses on his performance, with Zak steadfastly supporting him. Shinan confesses the truth about his and Raaya’s relationship to his mother, while Raaya learns about Shinan’s planned move abroad from Rizwana. Rafkhan advises Raaya to move on, but realizing Shinan’s efforts, she confronts him about his choice to leave. Shinan, however, chooses to seize the opportunity and face the situation pragmatically. Meanwhile, Kelly finally reconciles with his mother, who admits her past mistakes, leading to an emotional embrace.
50	12	"Episode 50"	Aishath Rishmy	November 11, 2024
Rafkhan invites Raaya to Thulusdhoo, where his sister-in-law shares how trust, forgiveness, and accountability saved her marriage. Rafkhan confesses his desire to be with Raaya, and she initially accepts—only to later reveal she chose Shinan instead. Zein teases Naail about Shaaya, receiving a sharp retort about Riyasha. Zein appears to reconcile with his third wife, Aasha, leaving Riyasha heartbroken, though it turns out to be a misunderstanding. Zak admits his feelings for Riyasha but hesitates, fearing he can’t sustain a meaningful change. They confess mutual feelings but decide to remain friends. Naail comes to deeply value his bond with Zak, vowing lifelong friendship. Before his performance, Zein acknowledges Shaaya’s efforts to regain trust. Shaaya and Naail reunite, and she proposes marriage. Zak clarifies her affections for Kelly, admitting she’s not ready for a relationship, and Kelly proposes lifelong friendship instead. A month later, Shaaya and Naail marry in a grand celebration, marking a joyous new chapter.

== Development ==
Ahmed Iqbal embarked on the screenplay writing process for the film in 2016. Originally envisioned as a feature film, the concept later evolved into a web series spanning four seasons. Filming for the project commenced in 2020; however, production was abruptly halted in response to the COVID-19 pandemic, causing a temporary suspension of filming activities. The project was officially announced on 28 May 2020 through an Instagram live hosted by director Aishath Rishmy, revealing most of the cast of the series. In the initial stage, the project was revealed to be co-directed with Ravee Farooq, however, Rishmy later confirmed the project with minimal changes in cast and production seat. Apart from the greater Male' region, filming took place in K. Maafushi, Vaavu Atoll, Laamu Atoll and Crossroads. The project was completed in April 2023.

== Soundtrack ==
Track listing
No.	Title	Lyrics	Music	Singer(s)	Length
1.	"Kulathah Chaalu"	Mohamed Abdul Ghanee	Barchie	Mariyam Rifqa Rasheed
2.	"Beynun Vanee Yaaraa" (original song by Ahmed Amir)	Mohamed Abdul Ghanee	Barchie	Mariyam Rifqa Rasheed, Mariyam Ashfa
3.	"Sirru Sirrun"	Mohamed Abdul Ghanee	Barchie	Mohamed Maisaan (Bokitos)
4.	"Aadhey Yaaraa Aadhey"	Mohamed Abdul Ghanee	Hassan Jalaal	Mariyam Rifqa Rasheed, Mariyam Ashfa, Mohamed Abdul Ghanee, Aishath Juni Jinah, Abdullah Fareedh, Hassan Jalaal
5.	"Yaaraa Ey"	Mohamed Abdul Ghanee	Barchie	Mariyam Ashfa
6.	"Loabi Yaaraa"	Mohamed Abdul Ghanee	Barchie	Hamoodh Ahmed

== Release and reception ==
The first episode of the series was released on 24 April 2023 through Baiskoafu while the first two episodes of the series was simultaneously premiered on Olympus Cinema.

Alim Abdul Latheef from Sun rated the first two episodes highly and wrote: "The series revolves around the intricate dynamics of relationships between spouses, family members, friends, and colleagues. The characters were introduced in an enticing and captivating manner, capturing the audience's attention from the very beginning". Apart from the cinematography, writing and direction, Azza's performance as Shaaya was highlighted by Latheef as the best thing from the series.
