= Saamee Hussain Didi =

Maldivian film actor

- Born: 15 May 1994 (age 32); L. Dhanbidhoo
- Occupation: Actor
- Years active: 2021–present

Saamee Hussain Didi (born 15 May 1994) is a Maldivian film actor. He began his film career with a small role in Madhoship Studio's black-and-white film Faree (2021). He later appeared in Ilyas Waheed's horror anthology web series Biruveri Vaahaka (2022), earning attention for his role investigative officer. In 2024, he starred in three projects with Dark Rain Entertainment, including the anthology web series Dark Rain Chronicles, the revenge thriller Fureytha, and the horror-comedy Bibii.

His first appearance in a leading role came in 2025 in the corporate thriller web series Hinthaa, directed by Ravee Farooq. This was followed by supporting roles in Moomin Fuad's thriller Abadhah and Ali Shifau's romantic web series Feshumaai Nimun. His performances across genres have been consistently well received, with critics praising his range and ability to adapt to diverse roles.

== Career ==
In 2021, Didi played a small role as a thug in Madhoship Studio's anthology film Faree (2021), which narrates the life of a single mother through her decision to leave a deteriorating marriage. Featuring Nuzuhath Shuaib and Ravee Farooq in the lead role, the film was presented in black and white, a choice noted by critics as a distinctive approach compared to conventional Maldivian films. The following year, he collaborated with Ilyas Waheed in the horror thriller anthology web series Biruveri Vaahaka portraying Dimaah, a member of the investigative team attempting to uncover the supernatural events resurfacing in the city. The series received positive reviews from critics, with particular praise for the cast's performances and Waheed's creativity in blending horror folklore into an "engaging visual treat".

In 2023, he again collaborated with Ilyas Waheed in the dark comedy film Free Delivery, which follows a delivery girl who stumbles upon an ongoing crime. Didi played the role of a drug addict caught up in the ensuing chaos during the delivery team’s escape. The film was met with mainly positive reviews, with critics highlighting the cast’s comic timing and Waheed’s introduction of the dark comedy genre to Maldivian cinema.

In 2024, Didi appeared in three projects produced by Dark Rain Entertainment. His first release was the Ali Shifau-directed segment "Baiskalu" from the anthology web series Dark Rain Chronicles, in which he starred opposite Aishath Razan Ramiz as a young couple inspired by the love and affection of a middle-aged pair. He then starred in Ali Shifau-directed revenge thriller film Fureytha, alongside Sharaf Abdulla, which tells the story of an ordinary man whose life takes a dramatic turn after becoming inadvertently involved in a gang-related murder. The film received positive reviews for its performances, fight choreography, and special effects. This was followed by Shahudha Mahmoodh's horror-comedy film Bibii (2024), which revolves around a married couple whose lives are thrown into chaos after moving into an allegedly haunted house. The film had limited international screenings in Spain and Italy, marking the first-ever Maldivian film release in the latter.

In 2025, Didi collaborated with Ravee Farooq on the corporate thriller web series Hinthaa, playing the lead role of Shiyaz, a sales and marketing director at the nation’s largest oil company, whose personal and professional lives collide in a web of corruption. The series was positively received by critics, with Didi and co-star Aishath Raaisha's performances being particularly praised for shifting seamlessly between "powerful and subtle" as required by the script. He then appeared in Moomin Fuad's thriller film Abadhah (2025) playing the role of a selfish colleague, Ayaan. Later the same year, he reunited with Ali Shifau for the romantic web series Feshumaai Nimun, alongside Sharaf Abdulla and Aminath Shuha. In the series, he portrayed Najah, a supportive brother who helps his brother-in-law uphold a life of dignity.

== Filmography ==
=== Feature film ===
Year	Title	Role	Notes	Ref(s)
2021	Faree	Thug	Special appearance	
2023	Free Delivery	Partey		
2024	Fureytha	Saamy		
2024	Bibii	Visham		
2025	Abadhah	Ayaan		
2025	Alifaan			
2026	Majunoon	Mode		

=== Television ===
Year	Title	Role	Notes	Ref(s)
2022	Biruveri Vaahaka	Dimaah	Main role; 5 episodes	
2024	Dark Rain Chronicles	Zihan	Main role in the segment "Baiskalu"	
2024	Yaaraa	Wedding Designer	Guest role; "Episode 47"	
2025	Hinthaa	Ali Shiyaz	Main role; 10 episodes	
2025	Feshumaai Nimun	Najah	Main role; 6 episodes	
2025	Moosun	Akif	Main role; 10 episodes	
2026	Barudhaasthu	Althaf	Main role	
2026	JunJulaa	Ahmed Zuhair	Main role; 10 episodes	
