= Noontha? =

Maldivian web series

- Written by: Ahmed Iqbal & Naaisha Nashid
- Directed by: Ahmed Iqbal & Naaisha Nashid
- Music by: Paighde
- Country of origin: Maldives
- Original language: Divehi
- No. of seasons: 1
- No. of episodes: 6

Production
- Cinematography: Ibrahim Moosa; Mohamed Aiman
- Editor: Rafhan Shareef

Original release
- Release: 22 December 2021

Noontha? is a Maldivian anthology web series written and directed by Ahmed Iqbal & Naaisha Nashid. The first episode titled "Rules & Regulations" was released on 22 December 2021 and stars Nuzuhath Shuaib, Ahmed Asim and Adhuham Layaal Qasim in main roles. The series where characters break the fourth wall, narrates the modern relationship of a love triangle. The second segment titled "Bits & Pieces" was written and directed by Naaisha Nashid which revolves around a professional interior designer, played by Washiya Mohamed was released on 30 January 2022.

== Cast ==
=== Main ===
Rules & Regulations

- Nuzuhath Shuaib as Sana
- Ahmed Asim as Sanim
- Adhuham Layaal Qasim as Ijaz

Bits & Pieces

- Washiya Mohamed as Zeeshan
- Mohamed Vishal as Hassan
- Ahmed Sharif as Amru
- Ibrahim Farhad as Siraj
- Shimal Hameed as Raaid

=== Guest ===
Rules & Regulations

- Nathasha Jaleel
- Aminath Shuha as Raina
- Aminath Silna as Sheena
- Aishath Shahufa
- Mohamed Vishal
- Shera Adam
- Mohamed Shivaz as Ijaz's colleague
- Aminath Shaanaa Saeedh as Ijaz's colleague
- Muneez Ibrahim as Sana's crew
- Ali Nadheeh as Sana's crew
- Khadheeja Fainan as Sana's crew
- Mohamed Aiman as Sana's crew
- Aktar as Sana's crew

Bits & Pieces

- Maiha Adam as Shiu
- Aisha Ali as Amru's friend

== Episodes ==
No.	Title	Directed by	Written by	Original release date
1	"Rules & Regulations"	Ahmed Iqbal	Ahmed Iqbal	December 22, 2021
Sana, a film director and a modern middle aged woman finds herself confined in a complicated marriage with Sanim. Out of boredom, she connects a random supporter on social media, Ijaz, a lawyer and a womanizer, with whom she finds herself attached, despite their several efforts to limit their relationship as friends. Meanwhile, Sanim becomes more affectionate towards his colleague, Raina.
2	"Bits & Pieces"	Naaisha Nashid	Naaisha Nashid	January 30, 2022
Zee a modern minded professional interior designer who is surrounded by a bunch of men whom she can instantly connects with including her business partner, Raaid, a passionate cook Amru, and her best friend, Hassan, while she feels abandoned at her own home.

== Soundtrack ==
Track listing
No.	Title	Lyrics	Music	Singer(s)	Length
1.	"Signal"	Humble Bakari	Faya	Raalhu Mariyanbu
2.	"Hatharu Angolhi"			Affan

== Release and reception ==
The first episode of the series was released on 22 December 2021, to positive reviews from critics. Favoring the presentation of development of the episode Dho? applauded Ahmed Iqbal for his representation of modern love and breaking the stereotyped melodrama, which Maldivians are most familiar with.

== Accolades ==
Award	Category	Recipients	Result	Ref.
1st MSPA Film Awards	Best Debut – Male	Adhuham Layaal Qasim	Nominated	
1st MSPA Film Awards	Best Costume Designer	Noora Rasheed	Won	
