= Mirai (web series) =

Maldivian web series

- Written by: Azhan Ibrahim
- Directed by: Azhan Ibrahim
- Music by: Mohamed Aiman; Fathuhulla Shakeel
- Country of origin: Maldives
- Original language: Divehi
- No. of seasons: 1
- No. of episodes: 13

Production
- Executive producers: Mohamed Mirusam; Hafiz Abdulla
- Producers: Shidhatha Shareef; Washiya Mohamed; Ihsaan Ahmed; Azhan Ibrahim
- Cinematography: Mohamed Aiman; Ahmed Zifaaf
- Editor: Azhan Ibrahim
- Production company: Silver Screen Entertainment

Original release
- Release: January 8 – April 21, 2023

Mirai is a Maldivian crime thriller web series written and directed by Azhan Ibrahim. It stars Washiya Mohamed, Sharaf Abdulla, Mohamed Ishfan and Aishath Shaaya in main roles. The pilot episode of the series was released on 8 January 2023. The series is based on the lives of different individuals running from their mistakes, facing the hard truths of life and trying to change their destiny. It follows a happy family falling apart due the untimely death of their only child and the journey the couples take to avenge the murderer.

== Cast and characters ==
=== Main ===
- Washiya Mohamed as Mira
- Sharaf Abdulla as Mohamed Sameen
- Mohamed Ishfan as Tony
- Aishath Shaaya as Aishath Shaaya

=== Recurring ===
- Izkan Mamdhooh as Mizkan "Mizzy"
- Fazil Fayaz as Ibrahim Zufar
- Aisha Ali as Fareesha
- Fathimath Visama as Zumra; Shaaya's friend
- Ibrahim Saalim as Anoof; Tony's friend
- Abdulla Zaleeshan as Ziyatte
- Mariyam Shima as Mihudha
- Usaid Ahmed
- Ravee Farooq as MP Yaugoob
- Mohamed Afrah as Shaaya's uncle
- Ahmed Abaan as Fiyaz
- Jameela Ibrahim as Sameen's mother

=== Guest ===
- Zack Ahmed as Lamman; Tony's friend (Episode 2 and 10)
- Ahmed Saeed as Dhanish (Episode 4)
- Mohamed Shivaz as Fathuhee (Episode 8)
- Mohamed Musthafa as Thaube (Episode 9)
- Fathimath Azifa as Mira's friend (Episode 12)
- Ahmed Sharif as Viaam (Episode 13)

== Episodes ==
No.	Title	Directed by	Original release date
1	"Haadhisaa"	Azhan Ibrahim	January 8, 2023
The episode begins as a young couple, Mira and husband Sameen rushing their baby, Mizzy to hospital. As they wait outside emergency room, impatiently waiting for an update regarding the status of Mizzy, the prior events of the day leading to the incidents roll in as flashbacks. Three hours earlier, Mira and Sameen leave for work as Mira's younger sibling, Shaaya comes to take care of the baby. Everything goes smoothly until the baby suffers a stroke. Few moments after, the doctors declared her dead. The family mourns the loss of the baby. Sameen has his suspicions on his colleague, Zufar, who came to pick Sameen for work. Sameen recalls him mixing something in the baby's water bottle.
2	"Fey"	Azhan Ibrahim	January 15, 2023
Sameen goes back to work while Mira remains home all day. Sameen requests Shaaya to collect Mizzy's medical report from hospital. Mira has a dream of Tony, Shaaya's boyfriend, mixing Mizzy's bottled milk with some substances. Sameen attempts to find out about Zufar's motives as his suspicions on him keeps growing. Shaaya has a fallout with Tony due to an alleged rape case posted by a woman, Fareesha on Twitter. Shaaya confronts Tony about his alleged rape case which he rejects as a baseless rumor. In a flashback it is revealed that Zufar knows Mira long before her marriage with Sameen, who happens to be attracted to Mira.
3	"Shakku"	Azhan Ibrahim	January 22, 2023
Sameen wakes up to see Mira back on her feet and lively for the first time after Mizzy's demise, who later is revealed to have an interior motive. Shaaya prefers to have some alone time while Tony follows her to clear their misunderstanding. Noticing few symptoms, Shaaya takes a pregnancy test at home and the result comes positive. Sameen confronts Mihudha, a friend of Zufar, and finds out that Zufar has been allegedly in touch with Mira from a long time, till very recent, contradicting Mira's version of story.
4	"Faara"	Azhan Ibrahim	January 29, 2023
Sameen checks Mira's call logs and validate Mihudha's accusation. Meanwhile, Mira starts her own investigation and meets a drug dealer who reveals to her that if the substance is mixed with liquid, it can have an adverse effect on the human body and may lead to suffocation. Mira tries to test the substance on a cat but hesitates at the last moment. Tony finally admits to Shaaya about having an inappropriate moment during his interaction with Fareesha but refuses rape accusation. Fareesha calls Shaaya but the latter conveys a neutral message.
5	"Reyvun"	Azhan Ibrahim	February 5, 2023
Sameen and Mira experience emotional distance. Sameen advices Mira to take a leave from work and visit her mother at homeland while she tries to convince him that he needs a break the most. Unsettled, Sameen requests Mihudha to spy on Zufar to confirm if he is having an affair with Mira. Tony fears he has been followed by unknown people.
6	"Rape"	Azhan Ibrahim	February 12, 2023
Sameen overhears Mira arranging a secret meeting with a caller. As Shaaya grows closer to Tony's family, she reveals some dark secrets of her to Tony for closure; Shaaya being raped by her uncle six years ago. Mihudha informs Sameen about Zufar's plans for the night which somehow corroborates with Mira's plan. Mira meets Fareesha and she narrates the incident of Tony's rape assault which happened two days back. Some details of the incident intrigues Mira and counsels her to come forward with her side of the story.
7	"Kalhu Dhabas"	Azhan Ibrahim	February 19, 2023
Sameen's mother sense tension between the couple and advices to spend more times together. Sameen follows Zufar and is certain that Zufar is not having an affair with Mira. The couple finally seeks solace in togetherness. Shaaya reminiscences her past and the untimely death of her uncle. Mira proceeds further with her plan by setting Shaaya with MP Yaugoob and buying resources to materialize her plan along with Fareesha. As Tony flees from a police raid, he witness Shaaya with Yaugoob, much to his curiosity.
8	"Hageegaiy"	Azhan Ibrahim	February 27, 2023
Police and Gender Ministry meets with the couple and reveals that their child dies from drug overdose. Tension builds between Tony and Shaaya. A scammer transfers half million rufiyaa from Tony's account which further escalates his problems. Yaugoob proposes to Shaaya but she hesitates. Mira tries to convince Shaaya to take a leap of faith in her life.
9	"Maru"	Azhan Ibrahim	March 5, 2023
Sameen ultimately confronts Mira regarding her interaction with Zufar and she finally speak the truth; Mira had a deal with Zufar to assist her expose the manager for fraud in exchange for money. Even though Mira is not proud of her actions, the deal paved her career path to a higher position. Shaaya has a mental breakdown and attempts suicide. Meanwhile, Tony tries to get intimate with Fareesha in another party which ends in blood.
10	"Dot Dot Dot"	Azhan Ibrahim	March 26, 2023
At the party, Fareesha and the other partygoers feel numb about Tony's situation and are discussing what they can do next. Shaaya is anxious about not knowing Tony's whereabouts after he's been missing for over a day. Mira confronts Sameen about his source of income, leading to his confession about the investment scam. They reconcile and vow to be more honest with each other. The situation takes a tragic turn when Anoof brings Tony's lifeless body to Mira's apartment, leaving the couple feeling helpless.
11	"Kafun"	Azhan Ibrahim	April 2, 2023
A flashback unveils that Tony's rape allegation was a pre-planned hoax involving Fareesha and her friends. Shaaya learns from Fiyaz that Tony was at a party with Fareesha the night before. Ziyatte instructs Fareesha and Anoof on their next moves, but Anoof's revelation about a spy camera in the apartment blows Ziyatte's cover. Mira and Sameen take swift action to hide the body.
12	"Faafa"	Azhan Ibrahim	April 9, 2023
Mira, burdened with guilt and remorse, discloses a shocking revelation to Sameen, including the painful revelation of the abortion of their first child during the initial three months of their marriage. Sameen places blame on Mira for the subsequent difficulties and challenges they faced in trying to conceive a child, as well as for the tragic loss of Mizzy. Meanwhile, unable to contact Tony, Shaaya turns to her friends for assistance in finding out about his whereabouts.
13	"Aa Feshun"	Azhan Ibrahim	April 21, 2023
Mira confronts Shaaya, questioning if Tony had entered their apartment on the day Mizzy died. In response, Shaaya divulges that Ziya had accompanied Tony during that visit. This revelation prompts Sameen and Mira to begin their search for Ziya. Eventually, under the weight of guilt, Shaaya confesses to everything that transpired on the day Mizzy died, including how she had concealed Ziya's packet of drugs in Mizzy's unused milk bottle and mixed up the bottles in a hurry. Sameen goes after Ziya in pursuit. Meanwhile, Mira uses the spy camera footage to conceal their involvement in the burial of Tony's body.

== Soundtrack ==
A promotional song of the web series titled "Umurah", sung by Falih Adam and Aishath Shamahath was released on 24 December 2022.

Track listing
No.	Title	Lyrics	Music	Singer(s)	Length
1.	"Umurah"	Mohamed Abdul Ghanee	Shahyd Legacy	Falih Adam, Aishath Shamahath	5:32

== Release and reception ==
Following the success of Azhan Ibrahim's crime thriller web series Dharaka (2021), Ibrahim announced his upcoming project titled Mirai on 8 August 2022. Filming for the series commence in September 2022 and completed in December 2022.

The first episode of the series was released on 8 January 2023 through Baiskoafu. Reviewing the pilot episode of the series, Ahmed Jaishan from Sun praised the direction by Azhan Ibrahim and "how smartly he builds suspense from the very first scene to the last".
