= Roaleemay =

Maldivian web series

- Written by: Shahudha Mahmoodh
- Screenplay by: Shahudha Mahmoodh
- Directed by: Ali Shifau
- Starring: Sharaf Abdulla; Mariyam Majudha; Sheela Najeeb; Roanu Hassan Manik; Aminath Shuha; Nuzuhath Shuaib; Moosa Aleef
- Music by: Hussain Thaufeeq
- Country of origin: Maldives
- Original language: Divehi
- No. of seasons: 1
- No. of episodes: 15

Production
- Producers: Aishath Fuad Thaufeeq; Mohamed Ali
- Cinematography: Ahmed Zifaaf; Mahil Athif
- Editor: Ali Shifau
- Running time: 23-35 minutes
- Production company: Dark Rain Entertainment

Original release
- Release: December 30, 2024 – March 31, 2025

Roaleemay is a Maldivian romantic drama web series directed by Ali Shifau. It stars Sharaf Abdulla, Mariyam Majudha, Sheela Najeeb, Roanu Hassan Manik, Aminath Shuha, Nuzuhath Shuaib and Moosa Aleef in main roles.

The series follows two intertwined narratives: Haifa, a rebellious young woman whose life is upended by an unplanned pregnancy, the sacrifices her best friend makes; alongside Liusha and Jailam, a couple struggling with the challenges of parenthood. The pilot episode of the series was released on 30 December 2024.

== Premise ==
The series follows Haifa, a rebellious young woman whose life takes an unexpected turn after a traumatic event and an unplanned pregnancy, forcing her to confront her past and reshape her future. Her best friend, Rayan, silently sacrifices his love to protect her, while her father battles a critical health crisis. At the same time, her close friends, Liusha and Jailam, grapple with the complexities of parenthood, navigating their own struggles. Through intertwined journeys, the series delves deeply into themes of love, betrayal, and the sacrifices made for those they care about.

== Cast and characters ==
=== Main ===
- Sharaf Abdulla as Rayan
- Mariyam Majudha as Haifa
- Sheela Najeeb as Raniya
- Roanu Hassan Manik as Haleem
- Aminath Shuha as Zara
- Nuzuhath Shuaib as Liusha
- Moosa Aleef as Jailam

=== Recurring ===
- Faina Fathimath as Jailam's mother
- Maleeha Waheed as Raya; Zara's friend
- Ali Nadheeh as Haifa's friend
- Fathimath Saaina Ahmed as Haifa's friend
- Mariyam Rikza Ali as Haifa's friend
- Mariyam Haleem as Bodey
- Ahmed Shakir as Doctor

=== Guest ===
- Dr. Fathimath Mufliha as Doctor (Episode: "Buried Secrets")
- Shahudha Mahmoodh as Host (Episode: "Buried Secrets")
- Adam Rizwee as Doctor (Episode: "Proposal")
- Mohamed Waheed as Magistrate (Episode: "Heartbreak")
- Maria Teresa Pagano as Doctor (Episode: "Fractured Hope")
- Hamdhan Farooq as Samah; abuser (Episode: "The Final Blow")
- Hamdhoon Farooq as an Dany; IT technician (Episode: "The Final Blow")
- Hazif Mohamed as Police Officer (Episode: "The Final Blow")
- Adam Afraz
- Ibrahim Aiham
- Niusha
- Aishath Nasha Binth Mohamed Shiar
- Aminath Aseela
- Aishath Laisha Latheef
- Aishath Rishmy
- Mariyam Azza
- Aishath Raaisha

== Episodes ==
No.	Title	Directed by	Original release date
1	"Rebellion"	Ali Shifau	December 30, 2024
Haifa, an outgoing and rebellious spirit, enjoys pushing boundaries, causing concern for her friend Rayan and her father, Haleem. Meanwhile, Rayan's relationship with girlfriend, Zara, begins to unfold.
2	"Entanglements"	Ali Shifau	December 30, 2024
Haifa's friends, Liusha and Jailm, faces challenges in their journey to conceive. Rayan introduces Zara to his circle, including Haifa, Liusha and Jailam. Zara shares news of her scholarship abroad, leading to tension with Rayan, who is upset about her impending departure.
3	"Sacrifices"	Ali Shifau	January 6, 2025
Zara discusses future sacrifices with Rayan, aiming to strengthen their relationship. Haifa's outings with a mysterious man raise eyebrows among her friends.
4	"Illness"	Ali Shifau	January 13, 2025
Haifa falls ill, prompting concern from her loved ones. Rayan contemplates marriage during a conversation with his mother, Raniya. Haifa experiences mental breakdowns and panic attacks, alarming those close to her.
5	"Buried Secrets"	Ali Shifau	January 27, 2025
Haifa confides in Rayan about her recent trauma, pleading with him to keep her secret. Rayan's altered behaviour leads Raniya to question him. Liusha and Jailam grow weary of the medical procedures in their quest to conceive.
6	"Unraveling Truths"	Ali Shifau	January 27, 2025
While Zara studies abroad, Rayan becomes increasingly distant, concealing his true feelings. Haifa discovers she is pregnant out of wedlock. Her father, Haleem, suffers a heart attack.
7	"Proposal"	Ali Shifau	February 3, 2025
With Haleem hospitalized, Haifa's pregnancy is kept secret from him. Conflicted and lacking the courage for an abortion, Haifa faces a dilemma. To protect her from societal shame, Rayan proposes marriage to Haifa.
8	"Heartbreak"	Ali Shifau	February 10, 2025
Haleem expresses joy over Rayan's decision to marry Haifa. Rayan ends his relationship with Zara, leaving her heartbroken, and marries Haifa. Liusha confronts the newlyweds upon her return.
9	"Blackmail"	Ali Shifau	February 17, 2025
Haifa expresses gratitude to Rayan for his support. She faces blackmail from her abuser. Zara seeks an explanation from Rayan regarding their breakup.
10	"Choices"	Ali Shifau	February 25, 2025
Haifa and Rayan discuss their future, with Haifa reluctant for Rayan to remain in a loveless marriage. Liusha and Jailam conceal their lack their lack of pregnancy from their mother to avoid disappointing her.
11	"Shattered Truths"	Ali Shifau	March 3, 2025
Haifa suspects Jailam's involvement in her pregnancy, shocking Liusha and Jailam. Overwhelmed, Jailam confronts his mother about their infertility struggles. Meanwhile, Raniya pressures Haifa for the truth behind her sudden marriage to Rayan.
12	"Dark Whispers"	Ali Shifau	March 10, 2025
Rayan lies to Raniya to cover up the real reason for his marriage. Raamiza investigates Haifa's past and suspects she was abused, confiding in Zara. Tension rise as Jailam and Liusha decide to distance themselves from Haifa and Rayan.
13	"Chains of Silence"	Ali Shifau	March 17, 2025
Haifa's abuser blackmails her, sending her into distress. She finally clears Jailam of suspicion but is left emotionally shattered. Meanwhile, Zara decides to leave the city, and Jailam and Liusha face another heartbreaking negative pregnancy test.
14	"Fractured Hope"	Ali Shifau	March 24, 2025
Jailam and Liusha consult an IVF specialist, gaining a silver of hope. Meanwhile, Haifa experiences severe stomach pain and bleeding, leaving her panicked and unsure of what's happening to her.
15	"The Final Blow"	Ali Shifau	March 31, 2025
Rayan finds Haifa unconscious and rushes her to the hospital, where they learn she has miscarried. While coping with the loss, Rayan discovers the blackmail messages and sets a trap, successfully capturing the abuser with the help of the police.

== Development ==
Dark Rain Entertainment announced Roaleemay as one of six projects on 7 October 2023, with the working title Gis. Later renamed Roaleemay, the project was later confirmed by in October 2024, with Shahudha Mahmoodh as the screen writer and Ali Shifau as the director. The lead cast includes Sharaf Abdulla, Mariyam Majudha, Aminath Shuha, Nuzuhath Shuaib and Moosa Aleef in prominent role. Filming was completed in November 2024.

== Soundtrack ==
Track listing
No.	Title	Lyrics	Music	Singer(s)	Length
1.	"Roaleemey"	Mohamed Abdul Ghanee	Hussain Thaufeeq	Mohamed Maaisan, Aminath Raaya Ashraf

== Release and reception ==
The first episode of the series was released on 30 December 2024. Upon release, the series became a commercial success, reaching the top position on the trending list of MediaNet Videoclub.

The series received positive reviews from critics. Aminath Lubaa from The Press praised Shahudha Mahmoodh's screenplay, writing: "Well-crafted and written, this series will be another huge achievement for Shahudha after Bibii". Lubaa was particularly impressed with the performances of Mariyam Majudha and Sharaf Abdulla.
