= Fureytha =

- Official film poster
- Directed by: Ali Shifau
- Written by: Ahmed Tholal
- Screenplay by: Ahmed Tholal
- Produced by: Mohamed Ali; Aishath Fuad Thaufeeq
- Starring: Sharaf Abdulla; Ravee Farooq; Mohamed Manik; Ahmed Saeed
- Cinematography: Ahmed Zifaaf
- Edited by: Ali Shifau
- Music by: Hussain Thaufeeq
- Production company: Dark Rain Entertainment
- Release date: 4 March 2024
- Running time: 157 minutes
- Country: Maldives
- Language: Dhivehi

Fureytha (lit: Demon) is a 2024 Maldivian revenge thriller action film directed by Ali Shifau. Produced by Mohamed Ali and Aishath Fuad Thaufeeq under Dark Rain Entertainment, the film stars Sharaf Abdulla, Ravee Farooq, Mohamed Manik and Ahmed Saeed in pivotal roles. The film was released on 4 March 2024.

== Premise ==
The film unfolds a compelling narrative set against the backdrop of societal decay in Male' City. The story follows an ordinary man whose life takes a tumultuous turn when he becomes inadvertently involved in a gang-related murder. As he navigates through the gritty streets and moral complexities, viewers are drawn into a gripping tale of survival and self-discovery amidst a landscape fraught with violence and injustice.

== Cast ==
- Sharaf Abdulla as Hussain
- Ravee Farooq as Zulal
- Mohamed Manik as Junaid
- Ahmed Saeed as Solih
- Ahmed Neil as Neil
- Ahmed Nashith as Dhalhey
- Mohamed Rifshan as Isse
- Ali Nadheeh as Aante
- Adam Rizwee as Zareer
- Aminath Aseela as Shifa
- Hamdhan Farooq as Hamdhan
- Susan Ibrahim Fulhu as Zulal's mother
- Saamee Hussain Didi as Saamy
- Mohamed Naail as Naail
- Mohamed Vishal as Nadheem
- Ahmed Shakir as inspector

== Development ==
The project titled Fureytha, a revenge thriller written by Ahmed Tholal was officially announced on 13 January 2021. Due to COVID-19 pandemic, the production house delayed the filming process even though they initially planned to release it on 22 February 2022. The film was announced to be extremely graphical and violent, compared to other local productions and the fight sequences are choreographed by Ravee Farooq. Lead cast of the film including Sharaf Abdulla, Ravee Farooq, Mohamed Manik and Ahmed Saeed were revealed in July 2023.

== Release and response ==
The film was initially slated for a theatrical release in December 2023. However, clearing the dates for November, another Dark Rain Entertainment film, Fureytha was postponed for a theatrical release on 8 January 2024. It was later confirmed that the film will be released on 4 March 2024.

The film garnered positive reviews from critics. Aminath Luba from The Press specifically lauded the performance of Sharaf Abdulla and the fighting choreography by Ravee Farooq. Luba also made specific mention of the impressive VFX, particularly highlighting the house explosion scene, and described the film as another "benchmark" project by Dark Rain Entertainment.
