= Bibii =

2024 Maldivian film

- Official film poster
- Directed by: Shahudha Mahmoodh
- Written by: Shahudha Mahmoodh
- Screenplay by: Shahudha Mahmoodh
- Produced by: Mohamed Ali; Aishath Fuwad
- Starring: Sharaf Abdulla; Mariyam Majudha; Sheela Najeeb; Abdullah Shafiu Ibrahim; Aman Ali; Ahmed Saeed
- Cinematography: Ahmed Zifaaf
- Edited by: Ali Shifau; Mohamed Faisal
- Music by: Hussain Thaufeeq
- Production company: Dark Rain Entertainment
- Release date: 7 October 2024
- Running time: 130 minutes
- Country: Maldives
- Language: Dhivehi

Bibii is a 2024 Maldivian horror-comedy film written and directed by Shahudha Mahmoodh. Co-produced by Mohamed Ali and Aishath Fuwad under Dark Rain Entertainment, the film stars Sharaf Abdulla, Mariyam Majudha, Sheela Najeeb, Ahmed Saeed, Aman Ali and Abdullah Shafiu Ibrahim in pivotal roles.

The movie combines elements of comedy and horror as it follows a married couple whose lives take a chaotic turn after moving into an allegedly haunted house. The film was released on 7 December 2024 and received mainly positive reviews, marking it as a notable debut for Mahmoodh as a feature film director.

== Premise ==
Jannat and Ziyan, a loving couple living apart due to work commitments, decide to start afresh together in Hulhumale. Despite Ziyan's unease over unsettling rumors about the apartment Jannat chooses, he agrees to move in to support her. However, their new home quickly turns sinister as they begin to hear strange noises and feel an ominous presence lurking in the shadows. Things take a darker turn when Jannat starts exhibiting bizarre and unsettling behavior, prompting Ziyan to call his mother, Nishana, and his sibling, Zayan, for help. This sparks fierce tensions, as Jannat resents their interference, and Ziyan finds himself caught between the escalating conflict between his wife and mother.

While Nishana dismisses the paranormal claims and invites her boyfriend Abdul Salam, to lift the supposed curse, Ziyan’s own attempts to find solutions lead him to consult his friend Rex, a magician, to no avail. Desperation drives Ziyan to Naeem, a reclusive neighbor upstairs, who provides him with an ancient book said to hold the key to combating the dark forces in their apartment. As the family battles the escalating supernatural occurrences and their personal rifts, Ziyan must uncover the apartment’s haunting secrets and reconcile the turmoil to save Jannat—and their fractured lives.

== Cast ==
- Sharaf Abdulla as Ziyan
- Mariyam Majudha as Jannath
- Abdullah Shafiu Ibrahim as Rex
- Sheela Najeeb as Nishana
- Ahmed Saeed as Abdu Salaam
- Aman Ali as Zayaan
- Mariyam Haleem as Bishara Ali
- Aminath Shuha as Ameera
- Adam Rizwee as Shareef
- Razan Ramiz as Shaina
- Hazif Mohamed as Shaheen
- Moosa Aleef as Nazeeh
- Ahmed Easa as Adhuham Satthar
- Ahmed Shakir as Naeem
- Mohamed Zeeshan as Pharmacist
- Saeed as Worker
- Maleeha Waheed as Yashfa
- Saamee Hussain Didi as Visham

== Development ==
Dark Rain Entertainment announced Bibii as one of six projects on 7 October 2023, with the working title Ava. Later renamed Bibii, the project was later confirmed by in December 2023, marking Shahudha Mahmoodh’s directorial debut for a feature film. The lead cast includes Mahmoodh's husband, Sharaf Abdulla alongside Mariyam Majudha. Filming began in December 2023, with over 85% of the shooting completed by March 2024.

== Soundtrack ==
Track listing
No.	Title	Lyrics	Music	Singer(s)	Length
1.	"Laalu Bibii"	Toy	Toy	Toy, Mariyam Ashfa	3:02

== Release and response ==
Bibii was theatrically released on 7 December 2024. Upon release, the film garnered mainly positive reviews from critics for its unique genre approach and performances.

Ahmed Hameed Adam from Minoos commended Dark Rain Entertainment and director Shahudha Mahmoodh for venturing into a genre outside their usual focus. Adam Mariyam Majudha’s ability to portray two distinct characters, Sharaf Abdulla’s "effortless" acting, and the comedic performances of Sheela Najeeb and Ahmed Saeed as standout elements. Aminath Luba of The Press similarly lauded Abdulla as a "versatile actor" and described Najeeb as perfectly suited for comedy roles.

Bibii also had limited international screenings in Spain and Italy, marking the first-ever Maldivian film release in the latter.
