= Thadhu =

- Directed by: Shamin Nizam
- Screenplay by: Shamin Nizam
- Starring: Ravee Farooq; Aisha Ali; Nathasha Jaleel
- Cinematography: Shahaain Ali
- Edited by: Shamin Nizam
- Production company: Madhoship
- Distributed by: YouTube
- Release date: December 4, 2020
- Running time: 18 minutes (Part 1); 14 minutes (Part 2); 19 minutes (Part 3)
- Country: Maldives
- Language: Dhivehi

Thadhu is a Maldivian three-part short film series developed by Madhoship Studio with regard to COVID-19 pandemic. The film is written and directed by Shamin Nizam. It narrates the consequences of the outbreak and perception of lockdown and new-normal in Male' City, through the eyes of three people. The project was developed in association with Health Emergency Operation Center, UNICEF and Health Protection Agency.

== Premises ==
=== Ahmed ===
Ahmed Ibrahim (Ravee Farooq) and Aisha (Aishath Rishmy), are an unhappy married couple on the verge of separation. The couple manages to save their marriage from the brink of divorce, as they slowly become attached to each other during the lockdown period. Ahmed tests positive to COVID-19 from random sampling. As he is taken to isolation, contract tracing from his case commences, where sample is taken from his mother, father and younger sister, Ameema (Aisha Ali).

=== Amee ===
Ameema starts having panic attacks after the news of COVID-19 outbreak. As symptoms start developing, her mother (Mariyam Haleem) is taken into the quarantine facility located in Hulhumale' which worsen Ameema's situation. The whole family becomes worried about their mother, with no news and updates from the concerned authorities.

=== Dr. Nathasha ===
Dr. Nathasha (Nathasha Jaleel), is a hardworking frontline officer working her dream job in spite of all the barriers. Nathasha gets transferred to the Hulhumale' Medical Facility, where Ahmed's mother is quarantined. As Ahmed's mother suffers from lack of oxygen, her life becomes dependent on a medical ventilator. Despite the best effort from the doctors, she dies from the disease. Dr. Nathasha conveys the unfortunate news to the family. Ahmed blames himself for the demise of his mother, while the whole family becomes disoriented.

== Cast and characters ==
- Ravee Farooq as Ahmed Ibrahim
- Aishath Rishmy as Aisha; Ahmed's wife
- Sara Shuaib as Sara; Ahmed and Aisha's daughter
- Mariyam Haleem as Ahmed and Ameema's mother
- Ali Farooqq as Ahmed and Ameema's father
- Aisha Ali as Ameema; the younger sister of Ahmed
- Nathasha Jaleel as Dr. Nathasha
- Ahmed Asim as Yoosuf; the supportive husband of Dr. Nathasha

== Soundtrack ==
Track listing
No.	Title	Singer(s)	Length
1.	"Kaamiyaab"	Achecia
2.	"Shakuvaa"	Affaf Shakir

== Release and reception ==
Pre-screening of the film was organized on 3 December 2020 for dedicated staff working in the frontline. The short film series was released on 4 December 2020 in YouTube which was later made available for streaming through Baiskoafu.

Upon release, the film received positive reviews from critics. Ifraz Ali from Dho? picked the film as year's best released project while particularly praising the cinematography by Shahaain Ali and back music. Impressed with the performance by Ravee Farooq and Aishath Rishmy, Ifraz noted all the actors did full justice to their characters, though "dialogue delivery of Aisha Ali needs to be improved". Aishath Eeman from Avas calling the film "a relief to the pain of COVID" was equally impressed with the performance by Ravee and Rishmy while also highlighting the "spectacular work in combining each part in the screenplay".
