= Ummeedh =

- Official film poster
- Directed by: Ali Shifau
- Written by: Ali Shifau
- Screenplay by: Ali Shifau
- Produced by: Mohamed Ali
- Starring: Mohamed Manik; Ahmed Asim; Ibrahim Jihad; Hamdhoon Farooq
- Cinematography: Moomin Fuad
- Edited by: Ali Shifau
- Production companies: Dark Rain Entertainment; Bull Archer Films
- Release date: June 23, 2008
- Running time: 54 minutes
- Country: Maldives
- Language: Dhivehi

Ummeedh is a 2008 Maldivian horror suspense thriller short film written and directed by Ali Shifau. Produced by Mohamed Ali under Dark Rain Entertainment, the film stars Mohamed Manik, Ahmed Asim, Ibrahim Jihad and Hamdhoon Farooq in pivotal roles.

== Premise ==
A group of four friends, Farhad (Mohamed Manik), Mohamed (Ahmed Asim), Afrah (Ibrahim Jihad) and Ibrahim (Hamdhoon Farooq) start their journey for a day fishing trip. Four hours later, when the group decided to sail back home, the engine stops abruptly and they get stranded at sea. A while later, they come across a cargo boat titled "Ummeedh" and together they get onto the boat once they confirmed it as a local ship. Afterwards, they start wandering on the ship hoping to meet somebody who can help them to return home. Confirming the absence of any human on the boat, they start eating the foods in the kitchen which later turns out to be expired and rotten. Having experienced strange events from their arrival, the friends separate to search for people. During this hunt, they find Ibrahim dead on the deck of the boat which creates distress and perturbation among the friends.

The hold of documents including a log penned by the boat captain indicated that nine years ago "Ummeedh" boat was reported missing along with its crews after sailing from Ivory Coast, where it loses all the connection from the port and authorities. Soon after, the crews, one by one, were killed under strange circumstances, in the presence of an unknown woman.

== Cast ==
- Mohamed Manik as Farhad
- Ahmed Asim as Mohamed
- Ibrahim Jihad as Afrah
- Hamdhoon Farooq as Ibrahim
- Sheela Najeeb as ghost
- Abdulla Firash as boy on Safari boat

== Response ==
The film was released on 23 June 2008 to positive reviews from critics where the direction, cinematography and performance of the actors were highlighted, and it was considered a positive change to the local cinema of melodrama. The film was later made available for streaming on Baiskoafu application on 30 October 2019.

== Accolades ==
Year	Award	Category	Recipients	Result	Ref.
2015	6th Gaumee Film Awards	Best Film - Short film	Ummeedh	Nominated	
