= Aisha Ali =

Maldivian actress (born 1997)

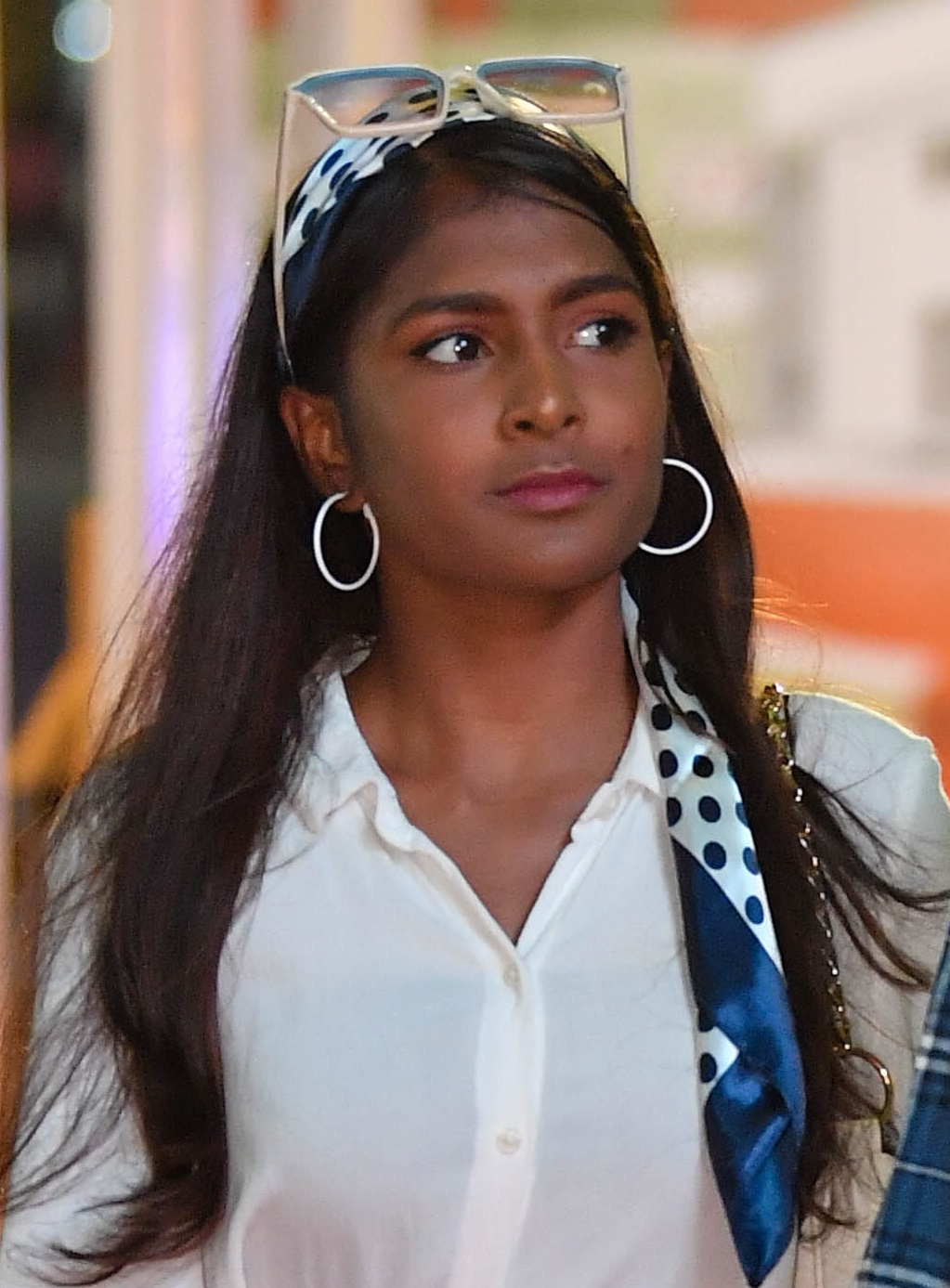
- Aisha attending Olympus reopening ceremony, 2023
- Born: 10 May 1997 (age 29); Malé, Maldives
- Occupation: Actress
- Years active: 2018–present

Aisha Ali (born 10 May 1997) is a Maldivian film actress.

== Career ==
In 2018, Ali made her career debut in Amir Saleem-directed social drama television series Lam opposite Ali Azim which received mixed reviews from critics where Ali's performance attracted mostly negative reception from critics for her "lack of natural acting, emotion and dialogue delivery".

In 2019, she starred alongside Raufath Sadiq, Lamha Latheef, Hussain Nazim and Ali Azim in Maldivian first sitcom Karu Hakuru developed by Mohamed Munthasir. The series opened to mostly positive reviews from critics, although reviews for her performance were mixed; where Aishath Maaha from Dho opined that Ali needs to "improve her dialogue delivery". The following year, she collaborated with Shamin Nizam for Thadhu, a three-part short film series developed by Madhoship Studio with regard to COVID-19 pandemic. It narrates the consequences of the outbreak and perception of lockdown and new-normal in Male' City, through the eyes of three people. Upon release, the film received positive reviews from critics. Ifraz Ali from Dho? picked the film as year's best released project though highlighted that Ali needs to work on her dialogue delivery.

In 2021, she first appeared as an obliging friend and colleague, opposite Nashidha Mohamed in Yoosuf Shafeeu-directed horror short film in Raajje TV's television series Hatharu Manzaru. Upon release, this chapter titled Fulhi met with positive reviews from critics where its "portrayal of the horror genre" was particularly applauded. Next she featured as one of the three roommates in Ibrahim Wisan's Girlfriends (2021) and as an envious friend who forces her friend into human trafficking in the last chapter of Ilyas Waheed's four-part anthology web series Mazloom. Mariyam Waheedha from Dhen praised the performance of Ali, while calling the chapter an "honorable conclusion" to a benchmark project.

This was followed by Azhan Ibrahim's crime thriller web series Dharaka (2022). The series revolves around a high-profile case of the disappearance of a politician's daughter. Reviewing the finale of the series, Ahmed Rasheed from MuniAvas considered the series to be an "excellent watch, if you are interested in good quality series". She also featured opposite Mohamed Vishal in Ilyas Waheed's horror thriller anthology web series Biruveri Vaahaka as Lubaa, a cunning friend who confines an innocent man in a killing streak to save her boyfriend.

== Filmography ==
Key
| † | Denotes films that have not yet been released |

=== Feature film ===
| Year | Title | Role | Notes | Ref(s) |
|---|---|---|---|---|
| 2023 | Beeveema | Raniya's classmate | | |
| 2023 | Nina | Marie | | |
| 2023 | Free Delivery | Sana | | |
| 2023 | November | Hudha | | |
| 2025 | Sorry | Neera | | |
| 2025 | Lily | Shaufa | | |
| 2026 | Lamha | Lamha | | |

=== Television ===
| Year | Title | Role | Notes | Ref(s) |
|---|---|---|---|---|
| 2018 | Lam | Shehe | Main role; 4 episodes | |
| 2019–2021 | Karu Hakuru | Leeza | Main role; 36 episodes | |
| 2021 | Hatharu Manzaru | Azura | Main role in the segment "Fulhi" | |
| 2021–2024 | Girlfriends | Fathimath Zila Ali | Main role; 24 episodes | |
| 2021–2022 | Giritee Loabi | Fathun | Recurring role; 20 episodes | |
| 2021 | Noontha? | Amru's friend | Guest role in the segment "Bits & Pieces" | |
| 2022 | Mazloom | Zara | Main role in "Chapter 4: Hintha" | |
| 2022 | Dharaka | Ana | Main role; 8 episodes | |
| 2022 | Biruveri Vaahaka | Lubaa | Main role; Episode: "Mask" | |
| 2022 | Gudhan | Abidha | Guest role; Episode: "04:47" | |
| 2022 | Netheemey | Sausan's step-sister | Guest role; Episode: "Nuvinama Ishq" | |
| 2023 | Mirai | Fareesha | Recurring role; 4 episodes | |
| 2023 | Badhalu | Zai | Main role; Episode: "Friends" | |
| 2023–2024 | Yaaraa | Nasha | Recurring role; 11 episodes | |
| 2023 | Gareena | Asma | Recurring role | |
| 2024 | Dark Rain Chronicles | Sara Ali | Main role in the segment "Lemon Cake" | |
| 2025 | Moosun | Nirasha | Main role; 4 episodes | |

=== Short film ===
| Year | Title | Role | Notes | Ref(s) |
|---|---|---|---|---|
| 2020 | Thadhu | Ameema | | |
| 2026 | Dear Diary | | | |

== Accolades ==
| Year | Award | Category | Nominated work | Result | Ref(s) |
|---|---|---|---|---|---|
| 2025 | 1st MSPA Film Awards | Best Lead Actor – Female | Free Delivery | Nominated | |
| 2025 | 1st MSPA Film Awards | Best Comedian | Free Delivery | Nominated | |
