= Hamdhoon Farooq =

Maldivian actor

- Born: 7 April 1988 (age 38); Male', Maldives
- Occupation: Actor
- Years active: 2006–present

Hamdhoon Farooq (born 7 April 1988) is a Maldivian film actor and dancer.

== Early life and career ==
Farooq was born on 7 April 1988 in Male'. His parents, Ali Farooq and Mariyam Haleem are actors working in the film industry since 1997. He is the brother of actor and director Ravee Farooq and comedy actor and dancer Hamdhan Farooq.

In 2008, he appeared along with Ravee Farooq and Niuma Mohamed in Ravee's short film Erey by playing the role of a thug who get trapped at a construction site. He then starred alongside Mohamed Manik, Ahmed Asim and Ibrahim Jihad in Ali Shifau's horror suspense thriller short film Ummeedh as one of the four friends who get lost at sea. In 2014, Farooq collaborated with Ahmed Nimal for his drama film Aniyaa, alongside Niuma Mohamed, Ismail Rasheed and Mohamed Jumayyil. Due to some technical difficulties while screening the film, it failed to garner enough hype and did average business with mixed reviews critics.

2018 was a dull year for Maldivian film industry with regard to 2018 Maldivian presidential election, though he had two releases, where his first film was the suspense thriller film Dhevansoora written and directed by Yoosuf Shafeeu. The film marks Shafeeu's thirtieth direction and features an ensemble cast of twenty-one actors. Revolving around a murder investigating, the film received positive reviews from critics and was considered a "norm-breaker" for the Maldivian cinema. He then starred in the first Maldivian web-series, a romantic drama by Fathimath Nahula, Huvaa where he played a brief role as a police officer.

== Filmography ==
=== Feature film ===
Year	Title	Role	Notes	Ref(s)
2010	Dhin Veynuge Hithaamaigaa	Himself	Special appearance in the song "Annaashey Hinithun Velamaa"	
2014	Aniyaa	Zaheen		
2018	Dhevansoora	Qalib		
2023	Beeveema	Raniya's classmate		
2023	Nina	Ali "Albo"		
2025	Sorry	Albo		
2026	Majunoon	Hashim		

=== Television ===
Year	Title	Role	Notes	Ref(s)
2009	Silsilaa		Main role; 5 episodes	
2012	San'dhuraveerey		Main role; 5 episodes	
2013	Adhives Eloaibah Gadharu Kuran	Hassan	Guest role	
2019–2020	Huvaa	Shaheem	Recurring role; 2 episodes	
2021	Rumi á Jannat	Jaadhu	Recurring role; 2 episodes	
2021	Girlfriends	Customer	Guest role; "Episode: Money Talks"	
2021–2022	Giritee Loabi	Lamman	Recurring role; 22 episodes	
2022	Dark Rain Chronicles	Ahdhu	Main role in the segment "Party"	
2025	Roaleemay	Dany	Guest role; Episode: "The Final Blow"	
2025	Feshumaai Nimun	Meesam	Recurring role; 3 episodes	
2026	Ganaa	Yasin		

=== Short film ===
Year	Title	Role	Notes	Ref(s)
2006	Dheke Dhekeves 4	Himself	Special appearance in the song "Hiyy Thelhey Varu"	
2008	Erey	Gaddi		
2008	Ummeedh	Farhad		
2008	Kurafi Dhaadha	Super Boy		

== Accolades ==
Year	Award	Category	Nominated work	Result	Ref(s)
2025	1st MSPA Film Awards	Best Negative Role	Nina	Nominated	
