= Mohamed Vishal =

Maldivian actor

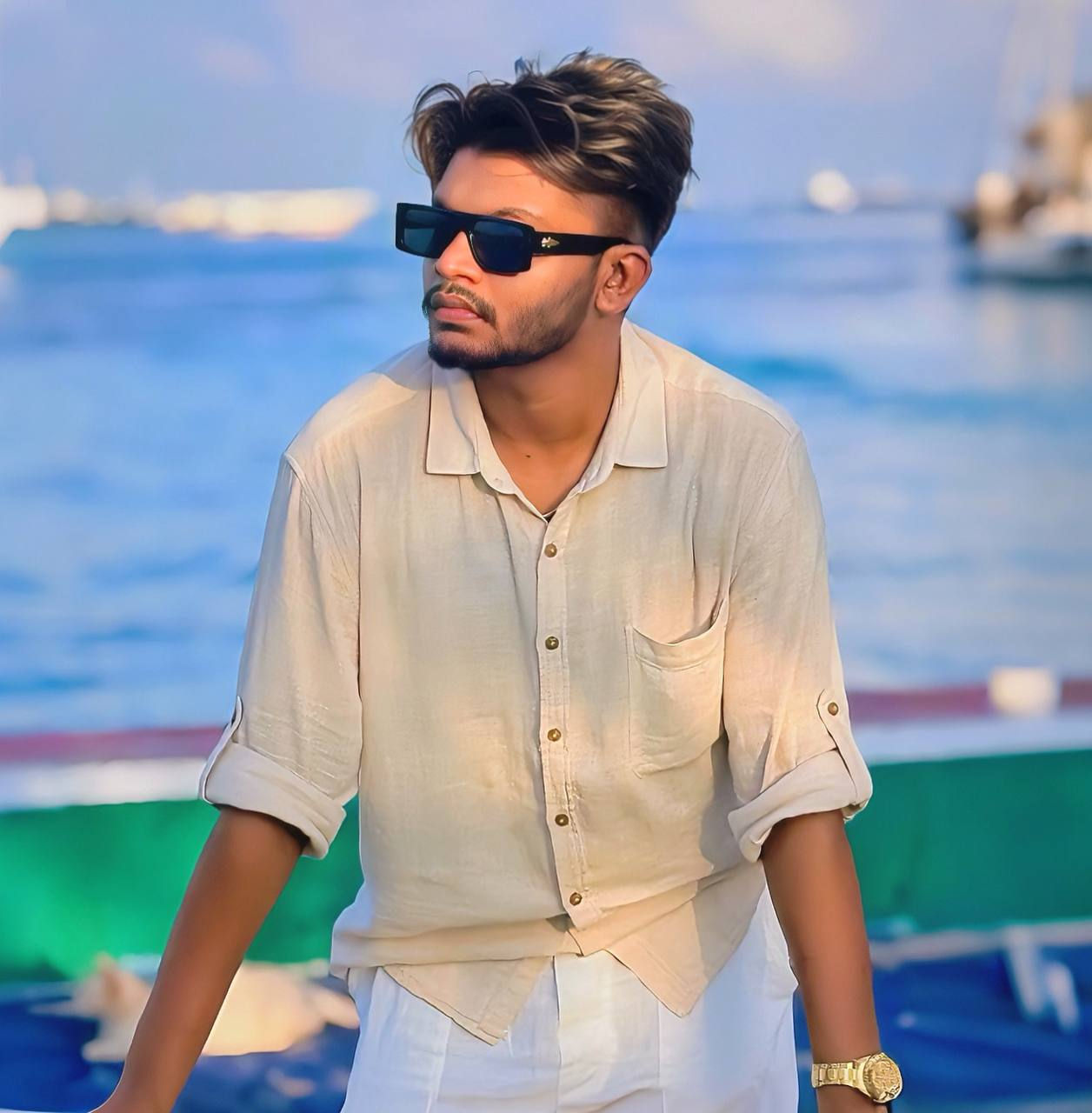
- In a General Shoot 2024, December
- Born: 9 May 1997 (age 29); L. Gan
- Occupations: Actor, Artist
- Years active: 2017–present

Mohamed Vishal (born 9 May 1997) aka Roman is a Maldivian actor and a performer.

== Early life ==
Vishal was born on 9 May 1997 in L.Gan. He describes himself as a "diffident" and "introverted" person who lacked the confidence to showcase his acting talent during school days. He completed his studies from Hamadh School, L. Gan. After completing his diploma in cabin crew training from the International Airline Academy in Sri Lanka, he began working as a brand ambassador for the perfume brand Bulgari at Duty Free Maldives.

== Career ==
Before pursuing a career in acting, Vishal became an active TikTok user, which enabled him to showcase his talent as a performer. In 2017, he starred alongside Maleeha Waheed in the music video "Abadhu Magey Hiyy" which was directed by Azhan.

In 2019, Vishal made his acting debut as the central character in the web series Ehenas, directed by Ravee Farooq. The show received significant critical acclaim and praise for featuring fresh talents, particularly Vishal, for delivering a "compelling portrayal" of a long-term victim of domestic and sexual abuse, highlighting the societal challenges related to marriage.

In 2021, Vishal collaborated with Dark Rain Entertainment for their romantic comedy web series Giritee Loabi. In this series, he portrayed the character of Faizan, a reserved young man seeking approval from his soon-to-be father-in-law. The following year, he starred opposite Washiya Mohamed in the segment titled "Bits & Pieces", which was directed by Naaisha Nashid. This segment was part of the anthology web series Noontha?, where he played the role of the best-friend of a modern interior designer. He then starred alongside Aisha Ali in Ilyas Waheed's horror thriller anthology web series Biruveri Vaahaka as Ayya, an innocent man compelled into a killing spree by a spell. Upon its release, the series garnered widespread critical acclaim across various aspects, including its writing, direction, performances, and visual design, notably for its "skillful incorporation of horror folklore into an engaging visual experience".

He then collaborated with Aishath Rishmy for her romantic comedy web series Yaaraa, which explores the polar opposite lives of two sisters faced with the realities of relationships. In the series, he portrayed the character Naail, the only son of a wealthy family and the submissive boyfriend of a social media influencer.

== Filmography ==
=== Feature film ===
Year	Title	Role	Notes	Ref(s)
2024	Fureytha	Nadheem	Special appearance	

=== Television ===
Year	Title	Role	Notes	Ref(s)
2019–2020	Ehenas	Ahmed Niyaz	Main role; 22 episodes	
2021–2022	Giritee Loabi	Faizan	Main role; 22 episodes	
2021–2022	Noontha?	Hassan	Main role in the segment "Bits & Pieces"	
2022	Biruveri Vaahaka	Ayya	Main role; Episode: "Mask"	
2022	Dark Rain Chronicles	Adam	Main role in the segment "Rankolhaa"	
2023–2024	Yaaraa	Naail	Main role; 48 episodes	
2023	Girlfriends	Baka	Guest role; Episode: "Click Click Click"	
2024	Dark Rain Chronicles	Shuhan	Main role in the segment "Dhey Handhaan"	
