= Sharaf Abdulla =

Maldivian actor

Sharafudheen Abdulla
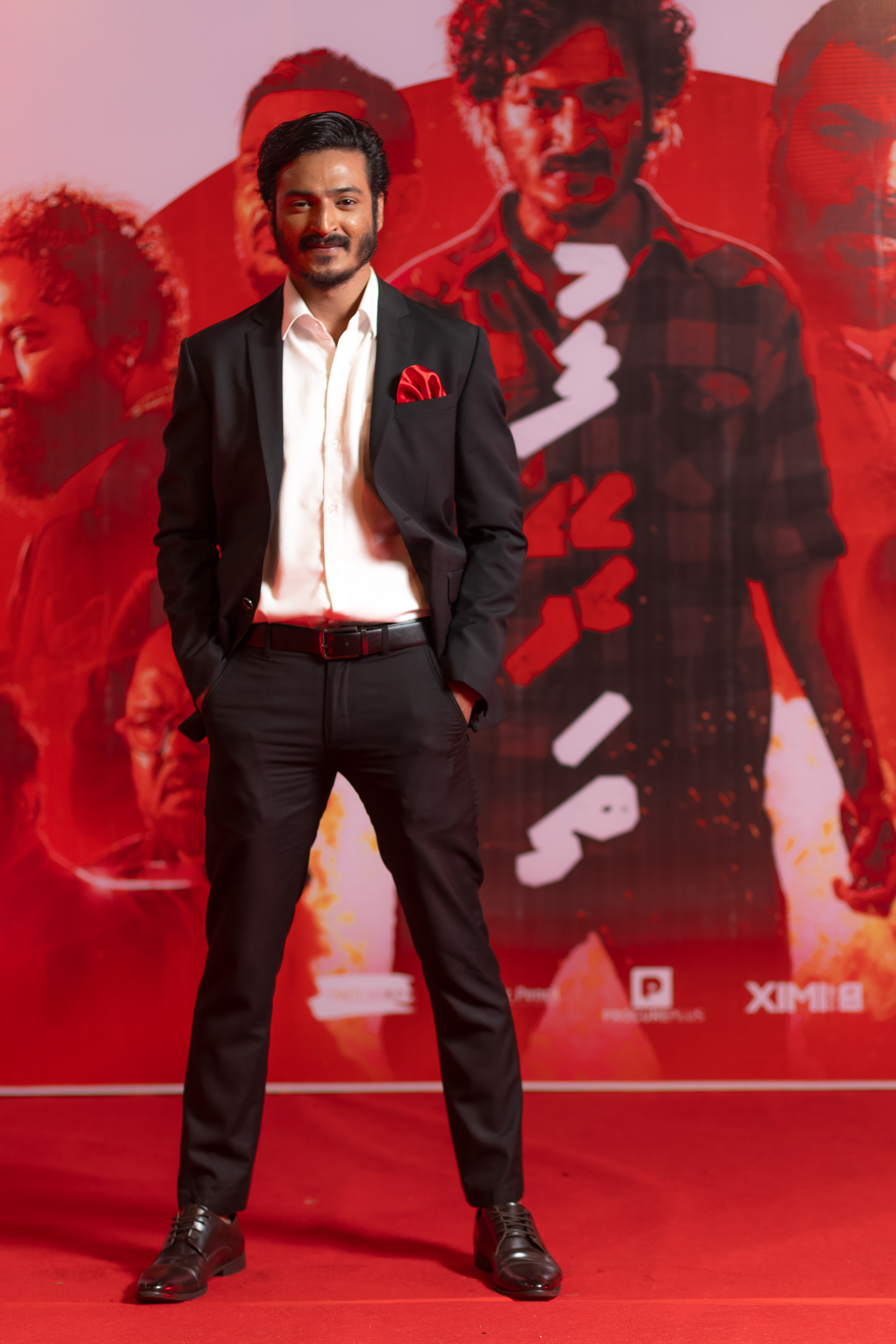
- Sharaf at Fureytha Premier
- Born: 4 August 1991 (age 35); R. Meedhoo, Maldives
- Occupation: Actor
- Years active: 2021–present
- Spouse: Shahudha Mahmoodh

Sharafudheen Abdulla (born 4 August 1991), commonly known as Sharaf Abdulla, is a Maldivian film actor.

== Career ==
After completing his education in his homeland, R. Meedhoo, Abdulla relocated to Male' in 2010, in search of a job opportunity. After working at several jobs, he joined a local television channel VTV, where he featured in a drama series developed by VTV. His talent was noticed by director Ilyas Waheed, who offered him to play a significant role for his upcoming venture. Abdulla's first project was Waheed's crime thriller Nina, where he was roped in to play the lead role against Nuzuhath Shuaib. However, due to the COVID-19 pandemic, the release of the film got delayed indefinitely making the path for his other releases. He made his career debut with Ilyas Waheed's four-part anthology web series Mazloom, which follows the lives of two survivors of alleged rape assaults. Reviewing from MuniAvas, Ahmed Rasheed praised the performance of Abdulla and wrote: "Though a new face, Sharaf has proved that he is here to stay, with his firm acting ability".

The following year, he worked with Ilyas Waheed for his horror thriller anthology web series Biruveri Vaahaka as Azaan, a newly wed husband who searches for his wife who disappears while on honeymoon. Upon release, the series received positive reviews from critics mostly pointing out the performance of the cast and writer-director Ilyas' creativity for merging horror folklore into an "engaging visual treat". His next project was Dark Rain Entertainment's revenge thriller anthology web series Dark Rain Chronicles where he played the role of a scammer.

Sharaf's first feature film, Hindhukolheh, produced by Dark Rain Entertainment was digitally released in 2023. In this film directed by Ali Shifau, Abdulla played the role Imran, a hopelessly Romeo who helps Kiara, a girl who recently loss her memory, to fulfill her long-held wishes. Starring opposite Aminath Rashfa, the film received mainly positive reviews from critics. Reviewing the film from Dhen, Aishath Areena called his performance "different" and "commendable" for portraying the appropriate emotions through facial expressions and vocal texture. The same year, he collaborated with Azhan Ibrahim for his crime thriller web series Mirai opposite Washiya Mohamed, where he played the role of a determined father seeking revenge for the murder of his small child.

== Filmography ==
=== Feature film ===
Year	Title	Role	Notes	Ref(s)
2023	Hindhukolheh	Imran Ali		
2023	Nina	Hamdhu		
2024	Mee Ishq	Ariz		
2024	Kanbalhi	Imma		
2024	Fureytha	Hussain		
2024	Bibii	Ziyan		
2024	Dheydharu Ruin			
2025	Alifaan	Rado		
2025	Alvadhaau	Ishaan		
2026	Jannath	Jibraan		
2026	Magey Bituge Wedding	Reehan		
2026	Dhevi	Vivaan		
2027	Mamma †			

=== Television ===
Year	Title	Role	Notes	Ref(s)
2021	Mazloom	Aidhin	Main role in "Chapter 1: Mazloom"	
2021	Girlfriends	Hassan	Guest role; "Episode: Crossroads"	
2022	Biruveri Vaahaka	Azaan	Main role; 6 episodes	
2022	Dark Rain Chronicles	Ahmed	Main role in the segment "Assalaam Alaikum"	
2023	Mirai	Mohamed Sameen	Main role; 13 episodes	
2023–2024	Yaaraa	Eddy	Recurring role; 26 episodes	
2024	Dark Rain Chronicles	Rayaan Mohamed	Main role in the segment "Lemon Cake"	
2024	Badhalu	Shifan	Main role in the segment "The End of Us"	
2024–2025	Roaleemay	Rayan	Main role; 15 episodes	
2025	Feshumaai Nimun	Aiman Ali	Main role; 10 episodes	
2026	Ganaa	Junaid		
2026	Beynun	Saif		
