= List of Maldivian films of 2023 =

This is a list of Maldivian films released in 2023.

== Releases ==
=== Feature film ===
†	Indicates films released on OTT platforms

Opening		Title	Director	Cast	Ref.
FEB	6	Beeveema	Ahmed Zareer	Mariyam Ashfa, Ismail Rasheed, Aminath Rashfa, Adam Zidhan	
MAR	6	Hindhukolheh †	Ali Shifau	Sharaf Abdulla, Aminath Rashfa, Ravee Farooq, Mariyam Majudha	
APR	25	Vanaajbeysaa	Vishal Zaki	Nazir Shiham, Hussain Shaad, Mohamed Saeed, Aishath Rimsha, Ahmed Shakeeb, Aishath Shiranee, Jalwan Mohamed, Khadheeja Ali	
MAY	3	Loabi Vevijje	Ali Seezan	Ali Seezan, Mariyam Azza, Aminath Rishfa, Ahmed Nimal, Ahmed Easa, Ali Azim, Irufana Ibrahim	
AUG	6	Nina	Ilyas Waheed	Nuzuhath Shuaib, Sharaf Abdulla, Mariyam Rasheedha, Mohamed Jumayyil, Hamdhoon Farooq	
SEP	5	Jokaru	Yoosuf Shafeeu	Ahmed Nimal, Sheela Najeeb, Ahmed Saeed, Ali Azim, Nashidha Mohamed, Hamdhan Farooq	
OCT	7	Kalhaki	Yoosuf Shafeeu	Yoosuf Shafeeu, Ali Seezan, Mohamed Manik, Aminath Rishfa, Washiya Mohamed, Aishath Lahfa	
NOV	4	Free Delivery	Ilyas Waheed	Thaathi Adam, Aisha Ali, Ali Raufath Sadiq, Washiya Mohamed, Ahmed Sharif, Mariyam Waheedha, Ahmed Shakir	
NOV	14	Zoya	Ashar Waheed	Yamlaa Abdulla, Fathimath Sara Adam, Ali Farooq, Mohamed Saeed, Ahmed Sharif, Mariyam Waheedha, Ali Fizam	
DEC	4	November	Ali Shifau	Mohamed Jumayyil, Mariyam Majudha, Ismail Wajeeh, Aishath Yaadha	

=== Television ===
Opening		Title	Director(s)	Cast	Notes	Ref.
JAN	8	Mirai	Azhan Ibrahim	Washiya Mohamed, Sharaf Abdulla, Mohamed Ishfan, Aishath Shaaya	13 episodes	
FEB	16	Hayyaru	Yoosuf Shafeeu	Ahmed Nimal, Yoosuf Shafeeu, Ali Azim, Sujeetha Abdulla, Shiurath Abdulla, Hussein Nadhuvi, Mohamed Ali	15 episodes	
MAR	25	Fandu	Mohamed Shifuan	Aminath Silna, Sheela Najeeb, Mohamed Manik, Hussain Nazim, Ahmed Ifnaz Firag, Thaathi Adam	13 episodes	
MAR	28	Hiy Kalaayah Edheythee (season 1)	Mohamed Aboobakuru	Ali Usam, Mariyam Sana, Mohamed Emau, Aminath Shaana, Mariyam Shafaza, Ismail Zahir	13 episodes	
APR	5	Badhalu	Naaisha Nashid	Washiya Mohamed, Aisha Ali, Ahmed Sharif, Maiha Adam, Maleeha Waheed, Aminath Shuha, Fathimath Visama, Ahmed Maseeh, Sheela Najeeb, Sharaf Abdulla, Aishath Raisha, Mariyam Nisha	5 episodes	
APR	24	Yaaraa (season 1)	Aishath Rishmy	Aminath Rasheedha, Aishath Rishmy, Mariyam Azza, Ahmed Azmeel, Mohamed Vishal, Ismail Jumaih, Fathimath Sara Adam, Hussain Shadhyaan, Mariyam Waheedha, Nuzuhath Shuaib, Nathasha Jaleel	12 episodes	
APR	30	Lafuzu (season 2)	Ahmed Nimal	Mariyam Shifa, Ali Azim, Adam Saeed, Arifa Ali, Fathimath Latheefa, Abdulla Naseer, Aishath Thuhufa	17 episodes	
JUN	15	Hama Emme Meehekey	Ameena Mohamed	Dheena Ahmed, Mariyam Waheedha, Ahmed Asim, Ravee Farooq	10 episodes	
OCT	5	Gareena	Mohamed Faisal	Mariyam Majudha, Mohamed Faisal, Ali Farooq, Ansham Mohamed, Rafiu Mohamed	13 episodes	
OCT	5	Yaaraa (season 2)	Aishath Rishmy	Aminath Rasheedha, Aishath Rishmy, Mariyam Azza, Ahmed Azmeel, Ali Seezan, Mohamed Vishal, Ismail Jumaih, Lamha Latheef, Fathimath Sara Adam, Hussain Shadhyaan, Mariyam Waheedha, Nuzuhath Shuaib, Nathasha Jaleel	14 episodes	
DEC	17	Girlfriends (season 2)	Ibrahim Wisan	Maiha Adam, Aisha Ali, Ahmed Sharif	12 episodes	

=== Dubbed film ===
Opening		Title	Director	Cast	Original language	Ref.
JUL	19	Kaushi	Ali Seezan	Biyanka Amarasinghe, Sakura Aththanayake, Amila Karunanayake, Rangi Rajapaksha, Isuru Sampath	Sinhala	

== See also ==
- List of Maldivian films of 2022
- Lists of Maldivian films
- List of Maldivian films of 2024
