= List of Maldivian films of 2022 =

This is a list of Maldivian films released in 2022.

== Releases ==
=== Feature film ===
†	Indicates films released on OTT platforms

Opening		Title	Director	Cast	Ref.
MAY	2	Hehes †	Ahmed Nimal	Yoosuf Shafeeu, Ibrahim Jihad, Ali Azim, Shiyaza Mohamed, Mariyam Shifa, Washiya Mohamed, Irufana Ibrahim, Ahmed Nimal	

=== Television ===
Opening		Title	Director(s)	Cast	Notes	Ref.
FEB	26	Lafuzu (season 1)	Ahmed Nimal	Mariyam Shifa, Ali Azim, Adam Saeed, Arifa Ali, Fathimath Latheefa, Abdulla Naseer, Aishath Thuhufa	15 episodes	
APR	2	Office Loabi	Amyna Mohamed	Rafhan Shareef, Ahmed Jillian Rashad, Ruby Fazal, Dheena Ahmed, Mohamed Shivaz, Mohamed Afrah, Aminath Shuha, Mariyam Waheedha, Ibrahim Salim Ismail	10 episodes	
APR	2	Bridge	Amjad Ibrahim	Sheela Najeeb, Ali Shameel, Ahmed Shaz, Amira Ismail, Mariyam Haleem	10 episodes	
APR	3	Vihaali	Ahmed Asim	Ismail Rasheed, Nathasha Jaleel, Hamdhan Farooq, Ali Farooq, Aminath Rashfa, Mohamed Emau, Aishath Rishmy	4 episodes	
APR	7	Shakuvaa	Bahaulla Ibrahim	Ahmed Easa, Nathasha Jaleel, Nuzuhath Shuaib, Mohamed Athik	5 episodes	
APR	8	Dharaka	Azhan Ibrahim	Ahmed Ifnaz Firag, Washiya Mohamed, Susan Ibrahim Fulhu, Aisha Ali, Ibrahim Jihad, Nathasha Jaleel, Ali Usam	8 episodes	
APR	14	Dhoadhi	Ali Seezan	Mohamed Rasheed, Ahmed Easa, Ansham Mohamed, Aminath Noora	15 episodes	
JUN	3	Biruveri Vaahaka	Ilyas Waheed	Nuzuhath Shuaib, Sharaf Abdulla, Mohamed Vishal, Ahmed Sharif, Mariyam Azza, Nathasha Jaleel, Sammah Mohamed, Saamee Hussain Didi, Ahmed Saeed, Aishath Rishmy, Ravee Farooq	15 episodes	
JUL	7	Balgish	Ahmed Nimal	Mariyam Shifa, Ali Azim, Ahmed Nimal, Arifa Ali, Amira Ismail, Abdulla Mahir	5 episodes	
JUL	8	Rimsha	Ali Shazleem	Ahmed Azmeel, Aishath Lahfa, Aminath Shuha, Hamid Ali, Mariyam Shafaza, Mohamed Afrah	13 episodes	
JUL	9	Baby	Yoosuf Shafeeu	Ibrahim Jihad, Ibrahim Yaeesh, Aminath Shuha	3 episodes	
AUG	10	Hissu	Ismail Shafeeq	Ibrahim Jihad, Rafiu Mohamed, Fathimath Sujana	3 episodes	
AUG	12	Yasna	Aminath Rinaza; Ali Rasheed	Ali Azim, Aishath Lahfa, Ali Shameel, Mariyam Haleem, Fathimath Latheefa, Ali Yooshau, Aminath Shaana	15 episodes	
AUG	21	Gudhan	Ibrahim Wisan	Mohamed Afrah, Mohamed Shivaz, Dimitri Vergé, Azmee Adam Naseer, Mohamed Najah, Fathimath Visama, Ali Inaz	12 episodes	
SEP	29	Netheemey	Moomin Fuad	Ahmed Sharif, Washiya Mohamed, Ismail Rasheed, Nathasha Jaleel, Mariyam Shakeela, Ismail Zahir	5 episodes	
OCT	13	Bahdhal	Ibrahim Jihad	Ahmed Easa, Fathimath Sujana, Shima, Mohamed Afrah	3 episodes	
NOV	12	Dark Rain Chronicles (season 1)	Ali Shifau	Adam Rizwee, Sharaf Abdulla, Ahmed Sunie, Aishath Yaadha, Ismail Rasheed, Fathimath Sara Adam, Mohamed Vishal, Ahmed Saeed, Aminath Aseela, Ali Shameel, Ahmed Shakir, Ahmed Sharif	6 episodes	

== See also ==
- List of Maldivian films of 2021
- Lists of Maldivian films
- List of Maldivian films of 2023
