= List of Maldivian films of 2024 =

This is a list of Maldivian films scheduled to be released in 2024.

== Releases ==
=== Feature film ===
Opening		Title	Director	Cast	Ref.
JAN	06	Mee Ishq	Azhan Ibrahim	Sharaf Abdulla; Aminath Rashfa; Ahmed Sharif; Fathimath Visama; Aminath Rasheedha; Mohamed Rasheed; Fathimath Latheefa	
FEB	01	Kanbalhi	Ilyas Waheed; Ahmed Ifnaz Firag	Nuzuhath Shuaib; Washiya Mohamed; Sharaf Abdulla; Ahmed Ifnaz Firag; Sara Binth Mohamed; Ravee Farooq; Thaathi Adam	
MAR	04	Fureytha	Ali Shifau	Sharaf Abdulla; Ravee Farooq; Mohamed Manik; Ahmed Saeed; Mohamed Rifshan; Aminath Aseela	
APR	12	Lasviyas	Mohamed Niyaz	Zoya Hassan Ibrahim; Ahmed Easa; Washiya Mohamed	
AUG	07	Saaya	Yoosuf Shafeeu	Yoosuf Shafeeu; Aminath Rashfa; Ibrahim Jihad; Mohamed Manik; Ahmed Nimal	
AUG	27	Kamanaa	Hussain Munawwar	Yoosuf Shafeeu; Mariyam Azza; Aminath Rashfa; Mohamed Rasheed; Mohamed Manik; Nathasha Jaleel	
SEP	19	Udhabaani 2	Amjad Ibrahim	Hamid Ali; Ahmed Easa; Aminath Shuha; Ali Azim; Nathasha Jaleel; Ali Shameel; Mariyam Shakeela; Mariyam Haleem	
SEP	26	Roboman: The Movie	Ibrahim Wisan	Misha Ismail Niyaz; Amelia Nasrulla Shakeeb; Aminath Noora; Mohamed Shivaz; Roboman; Mariyam Azza; Ravee Farooq	
OCT	07	Bibii	Shahudha Mahmoodh	Sharaf Abdulla; Mariyam Majudha; Sheela Najeeb; Ahmed Saeed; Aman Ali; Abdullah Shafiu Ibrahim	
OCT	29	Gellunu Rey	Hassan Haleem	Mohamed Manik; Aminath Shuha; Ibrahim Jihad; Mariyam Shifa; Mariyam Haleem	
NOV	20	Dheydharu Ruin	Ali Azzam	Sharaf Abdulla; Maiha Adam; Hazif Mohamed; Moosa Rasheed; Sushma Subedi	

=== Television ===
Opening		Title	Director(s)	Cast	Notes	Ref.
JAN	1	Dark Rain Chronicles (season 2)	Ali Shifau; Shahudha Mahmoodh	Mariyam Majudha; Nuzuhath Shuaib; Fathimath Sara Adam; Maleeha Waheed; Abdullah Shafiu Ibrahim; Mohamed Vishal; Aminath Shuha; Sharaf Abdulla; Ahmed Easa; Aishath Yaadha	9 episodes	
MAR	4	Sharthu	Mohamed Aboobakuru	Shafiu Mohamed; Aishath Lahfa; Shaheedha Ahmed; Fathimath Shama; Ali Shazleem; Ismail Zahir; Nashidha Mohamed; Abdulla Waheed; Suja Abdulla; Thooba Ahmed	15 episodes	
MAR	14	Yaaraa (season 3)	Aishath Rishmy	Aishath Rishmy; Mariyam Azza; Ahmed Azmeel; Ali Seezan; Mohamed Vishal; Ismail Jumaih; Fathimath Sara Adam; Hussain Shadhyaan; Mohamed Shaif	14 episodes	
APR	27	Vihaali (season 2)	Ahmed Asim	Nathasha Jaleel; Ravee Farooq; Ahmed Nimal	1 episode	
JUL	11	Ereahfahu	Yoosuf Shafeeu	Yoosuf Shafeeu; Aminath Rashfa; Ibrahim Jihad; Mariyam Shifa	15 episodes	
AUG	26	Yaaraa (season 4)	Aishath Rishmy	Aminath Rasheedha; Aishath Rishmy; Mariyam Azza; Ahmed Azmeel; Ali Seezan; Mohamed Vishal; Ismail Jumaih; Fathimath Sara Adam; Hussain Shadhyaan; Nuzuhath Shuaib	14 episodes	
NOV	28	Raiha	Ali Rasheed	Ali Azim; Aminath Noora; Ali Usam; Aishath Laisha Latheef; Ibrahim Fairooz; Ahmed Ifdhaau	12 episodes	
DEC	30	Roaleemay	Ali Shifau	Sharaf Abdulla; Mariyam Majudha; Sheela Najeeb; Roanu Hassan Manik; Aminath Shuha; Nuzuhath Shuaib; Moosa Aleef	15 episodes	

=== Short film ===
Opening		Title	Director	Cast	Ref.
MAR	27	Aimi	Madhoship	Aminath Silna, Ravee Farooq, Ahmed Saeed, Nathasha Jaleel	
APR	12	Eid Mubarak	Naaisha Nashid	Aminath Rishfa, Ahmed Sharif, Dheena Ahmed, Aminath Shuha, Mohamed Manik	

== See also ==
- List of Maldivian films of 2023
- Lists of Maldivian films
- List of Maldivian films of 2025
