= List of Maldivian films of 2025 =

This is a list of Maldivian films released in 2025.

== Releases ==
=== Feature film ===
Opening		Title	Director	Cast	Ref.
APR	28	Abadhah	Moomin Fuad	Yoosuf Shafeeu; Ismail Rasheed; Washiya Mohamed; Ahmed Sharif; Suzan Ibrahim Fulhu	
JUN	17	Sorry	Fathimath Nahula	Yoosuf Shafeeu; Mariyam Azza; Ahmed Easa; Washiya Mohamed; Hussain Sobah; Sheela Najeeb; Aisha Ali; Ali Shameel; Layaali; Evelin Livi Firash	
AUG	06	Loabin...?	Ilyas Waheed	Thaathi Adam; Ahmed Sharif; Ahmed Ifnaz Firag; Nuzuhath Shuaib; Ahmed Shakir; Aishath Gulfa; Aminath Rasheedha	
AUG	31	Kan'bulo	Hussain Munawwar	Ismail Rasheed; Mariyam Azza; Ahmed Easa; Washiya Mohamed; Sheela Najeeb; Ahmed Nimal; Mariyam Shakeela	
OCT	06	Alifaan	Ali Shifau; Ravee Farooq	Ravee Farooq; Sheela Najeeb; Sharaf Abdulla; Aminath Shuha; Moosa Aleef; Maiha Adam; Adam Rizwee; Ahmed Shakir; Mohamed Faisal; Mohamed Hazif; Aishath Razan Ramiz	
OCT	20	Ilzaam	Yoosuf Shafeeu	Yoosuf Shafeeu; Mariyam Shifa; Ahmed Saeed; Amira Ismail; Mohamed Jumayyil; Mohamed Faisal; Mariyam Shakeela; Ahmed Nimal; Mohamed Rasheed; Aishath Laisha Latheef	
NOV	05	Koss Gina Mistake	Ali Seezan	Yoosuf Shafeeu; Mariyam Azza; Ali Seezan; Aminath Rishfa; Ali Azim; Mariyam Shifa; Mohamed Jumayyil; Ahmed Nimal; Hamid Ali; Abdullah Shafiu Ibrahim; Ahmed Shakir; Gulisthan Mohamed; Ahmed Aman Ali	
NOV	20	Lily	Azhan Ibrahim	Ahmed Sharif; Aisha Ali; Mohamed Ishfan; Mariyam Shima; Ahmed Nimal; Mariyam Haleem; Ali Farooq; Aishath Arifa; Mohamed Waheed	
DEC	01	Alvadhaau	Ali Shifau	Sharaf Abdulla; Mariyam Majudha; Sheela Najeeb; Ismail Jumaih; Nuzuhath Shuaib; Aishath Laisha Latheef; Mohamed Mazeen; Hazif Mohamed; Mohamed Rasheed; Fathimath Latheefa; Maahrene Mohamed Ali	

=== Television ===
Opening		Title	Director(s)	Cast	Notes	Ref.
JAN	30	Hinthaa	Ravee Farooq	Aishath Raisha; Saamee Hussain Didi; Roanu Hassan Manik; Thaathi Adam; Ahmed Shakir; Mohamed Afrah	10 episodes	
MAR	3	Loaiybahtakaa	Mohamed Shiyaz	Nashidha Mohamed; Ibrahim Jihad; Ahmed Easa; Mariyam Shakeela; Sheela Najeeb; Ahmed Asim	6 episodes	
APR	10	Imthihaan	Abdulla Muaz	Ahmed Azmeel; Mariyam Shifa; Mohamed Ishfan; Aishath Laisha Latheef; Shaheedha Ahmed	10 episodes	
APR	28	Feshumaai Nimun	Ali Shifau	Sharaf Abdulla; Aminath Shuha; Moosa Aleef; Saamee Hussain Didi; Mohamed Rasheed; Aminath Aseela	10 episodes	
JUL	7	Varah Loabivey	Ilyas Waheed	Washiya Mohamed; Ahmed Ifnaz Firag; Nuzuhath Shuaib; Zaleeshan Samir; Hassan Samih Mohamed	5 episodes	
AUG	25	Moosun	Ali Shifau; Mohamed Faisal	Mohamed Rasheed; Saamee Hussain Didi; Mohamed Vishal; Aishath Laisha Latheef; Aminath Shuha; Mariyam Haleem; Fathimath Latheefa; Aisha Ali; Mohamed Mazeen; Mohamed Afrah; Nuzuhath Shuaib	10 episodes	
SEP	11	Hiy Kalaayah Edheythee (season 2)	Mohamed Aboobakuru	Mohamed Emau; Mariyam Sana; Nashidha Mohamed; Mariyam Shafaza; Shaha Adhunaan		
DEC	15	Chaalaakee	Moomin Fuad	Ismail Rasheed; Aishath Rishmy; Washiya Mohamed; Ahmed Saeed; Ismail Jumaih; Ahmed Ifnaz Firag; Moosa Aleef; Ahmed Easa; Ahmed Asim		

== See also ==
- List of Maldivian films of 2024
- Lists of Maldivian films
