= Mazloom (web series) =

Maldivian web series

- Story by: Ilyas Waheed
- Directed by: Ilyas Waheed
- Music by: Fathuhulla Shakeel Hussain
- Country of origin: Maldives
- Original language: Divehi

Production
- Executive producer: Asim Ali
- Producers: Asim Ali; Ilyas Waheed
- Cinematography: Ismail Munawwar; Samaah Ibrahim
- Editor: Ahmed Zifaaf
- Production companies: IFilms; Kazmik International

Original release
- Release: July 26, 2021 – February 12, 2022

Mazloom (transl. Victim) is a Maldivian four-part anthology web series directed by Ilyas Waheed. Produced by Asim Ali and Ilyas Waheed under IFilms and Kazmik International, the series focuses on several societal issues. The first chapter, following the lives of two survivors of rape assaults, stars Nuzuhath Shuaib, Ahmed Ifnaz Firag, Sharaf Abdulla and Washiya Mohamed in pivotal roles.

The second chapter titled Zarrook starring Mohamed Mahil, Sharif and Nathasha Jaleel, narrates the story of a young child connecting with an imaginary friend. The third chapter titled "Minju" follows the life of a victim of domestics abuse (played by Thaathi Adam), who realizes her self-value when her husband (played by Ravee Farooq) was bed-ridden due to a stroke paralyses. The fourth chapter titled "Hintha" stars Mariyam Azza as the victim of human trafficking.

== Cast ==
Chapter 1: Mazloom

- Nuzuhath Shuaib as Mariyam Zaha Zahir
- Ahmed Ifnaz Firag as Ahmed Maahir
- Sharaf Abdulla as Aidhin
- Washiya Mohamed as Fathimath Zaushan
- Ahmed Sharif as Moosa Fathih
- Ravee Farooq as Investigator
- Hassan Saamih Mohamed
- Ibrahim Fairooz Adam

Chapter 2: Zarrook

- Mohamed Mahil as Mahil
- Ahmed Sharif as Moosa Fathih
- Nathasha Jaleel as Niusha
- Ahmed Hameed Adam
- Md. Parvej Alam Rana as Manik

Chapter 3: Minju

- Ravee Farooq as Zaki
- Thaathi Adam as Shamra
- Zuwail Ali Thoriq as Yaan
- Ali Nadheeh as Majidh
- Hassan Saamih Mohamed
- Samah Mohamed
- Aminath Shamra
- Mohamed Afrah
- Aishath Lahfa as Rau
- Mariyam Azza as Hamsha; Zaki's sister

Chapter 4: Hintha

- Mariyam Azza as Hamsha
- Ravee Farooq as Zaki
- Ali Usam as Aroosh
- Aisha Ali as Zara
- Hassan Saamih Mohamed as Shaan
- Aminath Shuha as Shaan's friend
- Ahmed Shamaan Nazeer as Miqdaad
- Aishath Lahfa as Rau; Hamsha's friend
- Fathimath Latheefa as Zara's mother
- Ali Yooshau as Yootte
- Nuzuhath Shuaib as Mariyam Zaha Zahir
- Ahmed Sharif as Moosa Fathih

== Episode ==
No.	Title	Directed by	Original release date
1	"Chapter 1: Mazloom"	Ilyas Waheed	July 26, 2021
Mariyam Zaha Zahir (Nuzuhath Shuaib) narrates her survival story of rape attempt by his pervert and violent supervisor, Ahmed Maahir (Ahmed Ifnaz Firag), whose statement does not correlate with hers, accusing Zaha as the one who tried to seduce him. Meanwhile, Fathimath Zaushan (Washiya Mohamed) recounts her memory of being sexually assaulted by her bestfriend, Aidhin (Sharaf Abdulla), which also has different versions of truth and narrations, which ultimately leads to a masterplan of just one.
2	"Chapter 2: Zarrook"	Ilyas Waheed	September 21, 2021
Mahil (Mohamed Mahil), an only child of a working parents, spends most of his time at home with their domestic worker, Manik. One day, Mahil meets an fellow child named Zarrook who is not visible to others. Initially referred as his imaginary friend, his sudden friendship and concern over Zarrook makes his parents feel anxious.
3	"Chapter 3: Minju"	Ilyas Waheed	November 12, 2021
A crime investigation officer, Zaki (Ravee Farooq) divorces his wife, Shamra (Thaathi Adam) for talking to her ex-boyfriend despite his disapproval. Soon after, he has a stroke and is paralyzed. Although suffering from depression and anxiety, Shamra takes care of the household including her bed-ridden ex-husband and initiates a small business on her own. Once Zaki recovers, Shamra officialize their divorce and moves out with a spirit of independence.
4	"Chapter 4: Hintha"	Ilyas Waheed	February 12, 2022
Miqdaad, a politically empowered pimp, befriends with Hamsha, Zaki's sister and secretly records them having sex, which he later uses for the purpose of forced sexual slavery and blackmail, until she no longer can bear the pain.

== Development ==
After the success of the feature film Bavathi (2019), IFilms announced another venture in June 2021, a short film titled Mazloom produced in association with a newly established film production company, Kazmik International. The project was developed to encourage and support the hard working artists of Maldives during economically uncertain times with regard to COVID-19 pandemic.

Child artist, Mohamed Mahil, who was roped in to star in the second chapter of the series was noticed by the crew from his audition tape to a horror short film. The third chapter of the series titled Minju was announced on 5 October 2021 with the cast Ravee Farooq, Ifnaz's Ali wife, Thaathi Adam and child actor Zuwail Ali Thoriq. Filming for the chapter was completed in October 2021.

== Soundtrack ==
Track listing
No.	Title	Lyrics	Music	Singer(s)	Length
1.	"Loa Raiybey"	Maatu	Rydey	Maatu
2.	"Halaaku"	Humble Bakari	Paighde'	Thu
3.	"Khanjaru"	Humble Bakari	Paighde'	Thu

== Release and response ==
On 24 July 2021, it was reported that the first chapter of the series will be made available for streaming through Baiskoafu on 26 July 2021, on the occasion of Maldives Independence Day. The first chapter of the series met with positive reviews from critics. Ahmed Rasheed from MuniAvas praised the performance by each actor separately and noted the remarkable entry scene of Ravee Farooq as a "stellar surprise". Further calling the film a "benchmark project", he was particularly satsitfied with the writing and direction of Ilyas and how he maintained the suspense of the film throughout the chapter. Similarly, the third chapter of the series was met with positive response from critics, where Rasheed was particularly pleased with the performance of debutant Thaathi Adam for "perfectly" portraying the character of a woman suffering from domestic abuse, along with the acting of actor, Farooq. The series was ranked third position at Baiskoafu Original Chart revealed on 3 December 2021.
