= Thaathi Adam =

Maldivian actress (born 1989)

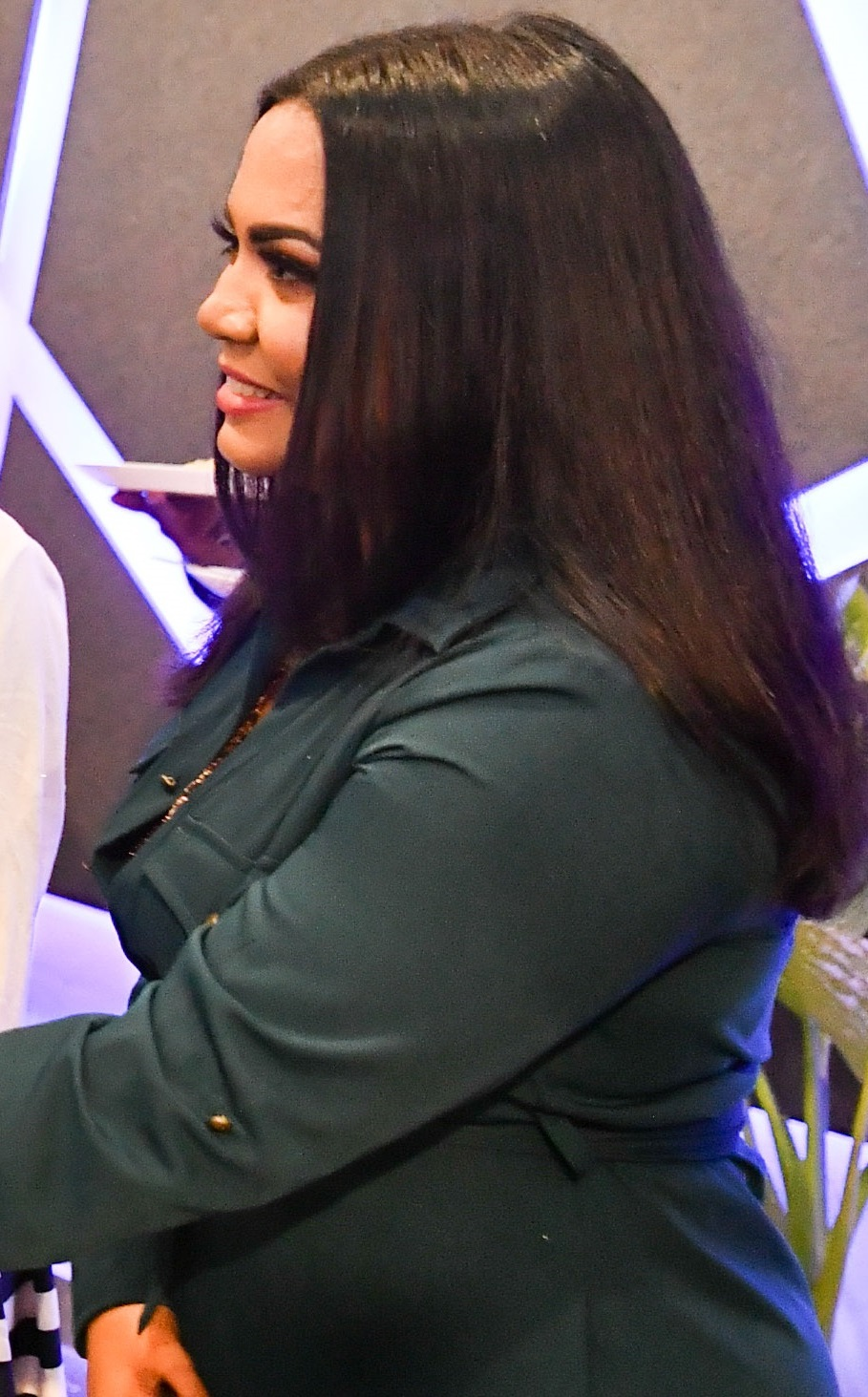
- Adam in 2024
- Born: 9 April 1989 (age 37); Malé, Maldives
- Education: Beaconhouse National University, Lahore, Pakistan
- Occupations: Actress; producer
- Years active: 2019–present
- Spouse: Ahmed Ifnaz Firag (m. 2013)

Fathimath Maisha Adam (born 9 April 1989), commonly known as Thaathi Adam, is a Maldivian actress and producer from Malé. She made her acting debut in 2021 in the third segment of the anthology web series Mazloom. She then appeared in the horror anthology series Biruveri Vaahaka (2022) and later in Fandu (2023). Her feature film debut came in 2023, with Free Delivery. Apart from acting, she has contributed to the Maldivian film industry as a production manager on multiple projects, including Bavathi (2019), Dharaka (2022), and Nina (2023).

== Early life ==
Adam was born on 9 April 1989 in Malé, Maldives. As a child, she had an interest in Bollywood films, and this sparked her desire to act. She was also inspired by Maldivian actress Waleedha Waleed. She completed her undergraduate degree in visual communication design at Beaconhouse National University in Lahore, Pakistan.

== Career ==
Before beginning her acting career, Adam appeared in two music videos in 2009. She later worked behind the scenes in film production, primarily as part of director Ilyas Waheed's team, including on the psychological thriller Bavathi (2019).

Adam made her acting debut in 2021 in a segment of Waheed's anthology web series Mazloom. Starring opposite Ravee Farooq, she received positive reviews from critics for her performance. Ahmed Rasheed of MuniAvas praised her work, highlighting her ability to convey a range of emotions, from a suffering victim to a dominant woman.

The following year, Adam collaborated again with Waheed on his horror thriller anthology web series Biruveri Vaahaka.

In 2023, she starred in her first feature film, Free Delivery , a dark comedy again directed by Waheed. Adam received plaudits from critics for her performance. Aminath Luba of The Press identified her performance as a standout aspect of the film, writing that "despite being a debutant, Adam delivered a solid performance worthy of commendation". That same year, Adam appeared in Mohamed Shifuan's web series Fandu.

In 2024, she acted in two films: Waheed's horror feature Kanbalhi and Mohamed Niyaz's Lasviyas (2024).

== Filmography ==
=== Film ===
List of film appearances, with year, title, and role shown
Year	Title	Role	Notes	Ref(s)
2023	Free Delivery	Sana		
2024	Kanbalhi	Shifana		
2024	Lasviyas	Shimana		
2025	Loabin...?	Sitara		

=== Television ===
List of television appearances, with year, title, and role shown
Year	Title	Role	Notes	Ref(s)
2021	Mazloom	Shamra	Main role in "Chapter 3: Minju"	
2022	Biruveri Vaahaka	Samiya	Main role; episode: "Edhun"	
2023	Fandu	Shabana	Main role; 13 episodes	
2024	Yaaraa	Host	Guest role; episode 50	
2025	Hinthaa	Firoo	Main role; 15 episodes	

=== Other work ===
Year	Title	Production	Notes	Ref(s)
2019	Bavathi	Yes	Feature film	
2021	Mazloom	Yes	Web series; 4 episodes	
2022	Biruveri Vaahaka	Yes	Web series; 15 episodes	
2022	Dharaka	Yes	Web series; 8 episodes	
2023	Nina	Yes	Feature film	
2023	Free Delivery	Yes	Feature film	
2024	Kanbalhi	Yes	Feature film	
2024	Lasviyas	Yes	Feature film	

== Accolades ==
Year	Award	Category	Nominated work	Result	Ref(s)
2025	1st MSPA Film Awards	Best Debut – Female	Free Delivery	Nominated	
