= Free Delivery =

- Official film poster
- Directed by: Ilyas Waheed
- Written by: Ilyas Waheed
- Produced by: Asim Ali; Ilyas Waheed
- Starring: Thaathi Adam; Aisha Ali; Ali Raufath Sadiq; Washiya Mohamed; Ahmed Sharif
- Cinematography: Samaah Ibrahim
- Edited by: Ilyas Waheed; Mohamed Abdul Ghanee
- Music by: Shahyd Legacy
- Production company: Kazmik International
- Release date: 4 November 2023
- Running time: 139 minutes
- Country: Maldives
- Language: Dhivehi

Free Delivery is a 2023 Maldivian dark comedy film written and directed by Ilyas Waheed. Produced by Asim Ali and Ilyas Waheed under Kazmik International, the film stars Thaathi Adam, Aisha Ali, Ali Raufath Sadiq, Washiya Mohamed and Ahmed Sharif in pivotal roles. The film was released theatrically on 4 November 2023.

== Premise ==
During a food delivery, a delivery girl stumbles upon an ongoing crime. Fearing for her life, she and her two coworkers try to expose the miscreants. Confusion, chaos and tensions escalates in this hunt for the truth.

== Cast ==
- Thaathi Adam as Sana
- Aisha Ali as Sana
- Ali Raufath Sadiq as Bilal "Billy"
- Washiya Mohamed as Julie/Jallaa
- Ahmed Sharif as Siraj Ibrahim
- Hazif Mohamed as Meettey
- Fazil Fayaz as Kokky
- Imad Ali as Zidhan
- Maishan Mohamed as Aakujjaa
- Abdullah Samooh as Sam
- Ali Inaz as Peekoo
- Ahmed Shakir as Customer
- Hassan Saamih Mohamed as Customer
- Ahmed Ifnaz Firag as Firaq
- Mohamed Abdul Ghanee as Lift Guy
- Fathimath Latheefa as Jameela "Jay"
- Mariyam Waheedha as Sumaiya "Shush"
- Ibrahim Fairooz Adam as Boss Partey
- Saamee Hussain Didi as Partey
- Aishath Razan Ramiz as Mal
- Fathimath Visama as Fahumeedha
- Adam Rizwee as Princess Milf
- Mohamed Afrah as Dadboo123
- Ahmed Arsham as Garage Guard
- Ibrahim Mohamed as Police
- Nuzuhath Shuaib as Bappi
- Fathimath Sara Adam as Mishy (special appearance)
- Ahmed Easa as Ishaq (special appearance)
- Aishath Rishmy in the item number "U I Ah" (special appearance)
- Ali Seezan in the item number "U I Ah" (special appearance)
- Mohamed Musthafa in the item number "U I Ah" (special appearance)
- Ahmed Abaan in the item number "U I Ah" (special appearance)
- Mohamed Yamin Ali in the item number "U I Ah" (special appearance)
- Ali Nadheeh in the item number "U I Ah" (special appearance)

== Development ==
The project was announced on 29 April 2023 as the first feature film from Kazmik International studio and the third film directed by Ilyas Waheed after Bavathi (2019) and Nina. The cast of the series was announced on 26 July 2023, which comprises several actors making their debut in a feature film including Thaathi Adam, Ali Raufath Sadiq, Hazif Mohamed, Fazil Fayaz, Fathimath Visama, Aishath Razan Ramiz and Saamee Hussain Didi, along with other actor including Aisha Ali, Washiya Mohamed, Ahmed Sharif, Mariyam Waheedha, Fathimath Latheefa and Ahmed Ifnaz Firag. Filming was completed in mid-July 2023.

== Soundtrack ==
Track listing
No.	Title	Lyrics	Music	Singer(s)	Length
1.	"Free Delivery" (Promotional song)	Ilyas Waheed, Asim Ali	Shahyd Legacy	Hussain Samah, Aishath Humaisha Yoosuf, Ahmed Ifnaz Firag, Ahmed Sharif	3:25
2.	"U, I Ah"	Ilyas Waheed	Shahyd Legacy	Shaheedha Mohamed, Ahmed Ifnaz Firag	4:20
3.	"Dhuvey Dhuvey"	Asim Ali	Shahyd Legacy	Ahmed Ifnaz Firag, Ahmed Sharif	2:44

== Release and reception ==
Free Delivery was theatrically released on 4 November 2023. The film received mainly positive reviews from critics. Aminath Luba, reviewing from The Press lauded Ali Raufath Sadiq's comic timing and Thaathi Adam and Aisha Ali's "exceptional" performance, along with Ilyas Waheed's "brilliant" direction and his effort in introducing the genre of 'dark comedy' to Maldivian cinema.

== Accolades ==
Award	Category	Recipient(s) and nominee(s)	Result	Ref(s)
1st MSPA Film Awards	Best Lead Actor – Female	Aisha Ali	Nominated	
1st MSPA Film Awards	Best Debut – Male	Ali Raufath Sodiq	Won	
1st MSPA Film Awards	Best Debut – Female	Thaathi Adam	Nominated	
1st MSPA Film Awards	Best Comedian	Ali Raufath Sodiq	Won	
1st MSPA Film Awards	Best Comedian	Aisha Ali	Nominated	
1st MSPA Film Awards	Best Original Screenplay	Ilyas Waheed	Nominated	
1st MSPA Film Awards	Best Editor	Ilyas Waheed, Mohamed Abdul Ghanee	Nominated	
