= Hatharu Manzaru =

2021 Maldivian short film anthology

- Produced by: Raajje TV
- Distributed by: Raajje TV
- Release date: 2021
- Country: Maldives
- Language: Dhivehi

Hatharu Manzaru is a 2021 Maldivian short film anthology series produced and distributed by Raajje TV during Ramadan 1442.

== List of productions ==
Title	Release date	Director(s)	Studio	Writer(s)	Cinematographer(s)	Editor(s)
Hayaaiy	16 April 2021	Ravee Farooq	R Squared Studio	Ravee Farooq	Samah Ibrahim	Ravee Farooq
Ruqyah	23 April 2021	Abdulla Muaz	Abdulla Muaz Productions	Mahdi Ahmed	Samah Ibrahim	Abdulla Muaz
Fulhi	30 April 2021	Yoosuf Shafeeu	Eupe Productions	Yoosuf Shafeeu	Shivaz Abdulla	Yoosuf Shafeeu
Naama	12 May 2021	Abbe Razzag	S Production	Ali Seezan	Samah Ibrahim	Ali Seezan

== Premises ==
=== Hayaaiy ===
Solah (Mohamed Samah), a taxi driver, a divorced man and a father of seven years old child, is asked by her mother, Zahira (Aminath Rasheedha) to look after his grumpy, handicapped father, Nashidh (Ali Farooq) to which he reluctantly agrees. He is groomed by his uncle, Rasheed (Mohamed Rasheed) and has a hard time adjusting and digesting his father's brutal words while trying to sort things with his ex-wife, Muna (Aishath Rishmy) and their son, Suleiman (Mohamed Ethan Jumaih). Soon after, Solah realizes that he is becoming a mirror-reflection of Nashidh, his most disliked person.

=== Ruqyah ===
Adhila (Aishath Rishmy), a young woman having a troubled relationship with her younger sister, Zeena (Mariyam Azza), starts having sleeping disorder and her husband, Easa (Ahmed Easa) brings home Usman (Ahmed Sharif) to perform ruqyah. Soon after, when Zeena suspects that Usman and Easa is torturing her sister while confined to a room under the premise of ruqyah, Usman manipulates Easa and the sisters into believing that they are possessed by evil jinn. The women were sexually, physically and psychologically abused in the name of punishing the jinn, which included beatings, being treated as a slave, being denied an adequate amount of food and sleep deprivation.

=== Fulhi ===
Reesha (Nashidha Mohamed), a married woman, separated from her husband, Zaidh (Ahmed Easa) who is desperately trying to get back with her. One night, she is greeted by a "glass bottle" at her doorstep which then becomes a routine attachment of her during night time, appearing at her house and following her from work to home, to the point she becomes mentally disturbed. Scared of the recent events, Reesha reconciles with Zaidh and goes back to his house, much to the disappointment of Wadde (Mohamed Waheed), the sorcerer behind the evilness.

=== Naama ===
A middle-aged man (Ali Seezan) receives a flash drive which has a video recording of a young man (Mohamed Ishfan) narrating a strange incident he experienced, where he gets accompanied by a random woman (Ansham Mohamed) he met one late night on the beach of Hulhumale'. The video ends when the harassed individual is killed by the woman when he intends to use spell against her with the help of his brother (Ahmed Easa). As soon as the viewer played the video, he finds himself entrapped in the young man's vision.

== Cast and characters ==
Hayaaiy

- Mohamed Rasheed as Rasheed
- Ali Farooq as Nashidh
- Mohamed Samah as Solah
- Mohamed Eithan Jumaih as Suleiman
- Aminath Rasheedha as Zahira (voice-over)
- Aishath Rishmy as Muna (voice-over)
- Mariyam Azza as Sama (voice-over)

Ruqyah

- Aishath Rishmy as Adhila
- Mariyam Azza as Zeena
- Ahmed Easa as Easa
- Ahmed Sharif as Usman
- Ali Farooq as Bodube

Fulhi

- Nashidha Mohamed as Reesha
- Ahmed Easa as Zaidh
- Aisha Ali as Azura
- Mohamed Waheed as Wadde

Naama

- Ali Seezan
- Nashidha Mohamed
- Ahmed Easa
- Mohamed Ishfan
- Ansham Mohamed

== Development ==
For the segment Ruqyah, the screenwriter, Mahdi Ahmed along with director Abdulla Muaz visited a one-room apartment to discuss how the narrative could be spread visually inside the premise. The entire segment was filmed inside this apartment. Initially, the director cast two other actors for the leading role, however due to their scheduling conflict, Muaz later roped in the two off-screen sisters, Aishath Rishmy and Mariyam Azza for their respective roles.

== Release and reception ==
The initial segment, Hayaaiy was released on 16 April 2021. This episode met with positive reviews from critics, where Mariyam Dheema from Muni Avas appraised the work by Ravee Farooq for presenting the storyline in it most "realistic" manner. The next segment Ruqyah was released on 23 April 2021 to positive reviews from critics for its "realistic" and "elaborative" presentation of the "recent fake ruqyah practice", performed by two individuals from R. Dhuvaafaru. The third film, Fulhi was released on 30 April 2021 and was noted for its "portrayal of horror genre in a realistic way from the regular local flicks".

== Accolades ==
Award	Category	Recipients	Result	Ref.
NKFA Bangkok International Film Festival – 2023	Best Short Film	Hayaaiy	Won	
3rd Karnataka International Film Festival – 2023	Best Director – Short Film	Abdulla Muaz for Ruqyah	Won	
3rd Karnataka International Film Festival – 2023	Best Supporting Actor – Short Film	Ahmed Sharif for Ruqyah	Won	
