= Kanbalhi =

- Official film poster
- Directed by: Ahmed Ifnaz Firag; Ilyas Waheed
- Screenplay by: Ilyas Waheed
- Produced by: Asim Ali; Ahmed Ifnaz Firag
- Starring: Nuzuhath Shuaib; Washiya Mohamed; Sharaf Abdulla; Ahmed Ifnaz Firag
- Cinematography: Samaah Ali
- Edited by: Ilyas Waheed; Ahmed Ifnaz Firag
- Music by: Shahyd Legacy
- Production company: IFilms
- Release date: 1 February 2024
- Country: Maldives
- Language: Dhivehi

Kanbalhi is a 2024 Maldivian film written by Ilyas Waheed and co-directed by Waheed and Ahmed Ifnaz Firag. Co-produced by Waheed and Asim Ali under IFilms, the film stars Nuzuhath Shuaib, Washiya Mohamed, Sharaf Abdulla, Sara Binth Mohamed Fariq and Ahmed Ifnaz Firag in pivotal roles. The film was released on 1 February 2024.

== Premise ==
Following a devastating loss, a wife and her six-year-old daughter seek solace in a fresh start, moving into a new apartment. However, their hopes for a peaceful beginning are shattered as they encounter a series of inexplicable occurrences. As eerie events escalate, threatening their sense of safety and sanity, the pair must unravel the mysteries surrounding their new home before they are consumed by its sinister secrets.

== Cast ==
- Nuzuhath Shuaib as Aalia
- Washiya Mohamed as Aalin
- Sharaf Abdulla as Imma
- Ahmed Ifnaz Firag as Akram
- Sara Binth Mohamed Fariq
- Ravee Farooq as Areesh
- Thaathi Adam as Shifana
- Mohamed Ishfan as Saamih
- Moosa Aleef as Riyaz
- Hazif Mohamed as Nimal
- Ali Nadheeh as Hassan
- Fathimath Latheefa as Mareena
- Mohamed Afrah
- Mohamed Najah
- Ahmed Rauf
- Hassan Saamih Mohamed
- Fathimath Visama
- Dheena Ahmed

== Production ==
In October 2023, director Ilyas Waheed announced the third feature film under IFilms as Kanbalhi, a horror film co-directed with actor Ahmed Ifnaz Firag. First schedule of filming began in October and continued until November, as the team got pre-occupied with the marketing and promotion of Free Delivery (2023). Filming was resumed on 6 December 2023. The primary cast of the film including Nuzuhath Shuaib, Washiya Mohamed, Sharaf Abdulla, Ahmed Ifnaz Firag and six years old Sara Binth Mohamed Fariq were announced in October 2023, followed by other members of the cast slated to feature is supporting roles. On 16 December 2023, actor Ravee Farooq was roped in to play a significant role in the film.

== Soundtrack ==
Track listing
No.	Title	Lyrics	Music	Singer(s)	Length
1.	"Aadhey Dhaan"	Abdul Basith Abdul Samad	Shahyd Legacy	Mariyam Salwa	4:13
2.	"Kanbalhi" (Title song)	Asim Ali	Shahyd Legacy	Mohamed Muazzin Naeem	2:54

== Release ==
Kanbalhi was theatrically released on 1 February 2024.
