= Shakuvaa =

Maldivian television series

- Genre: Family drama
- Screenplay by: Bimma Ibrahim Waheed
- Story by: Bimma Ibrahim Waheed
- Directed by: Bahaulla Ibrahim
- Music by: Ahmed Imthiyaz
- Country of origin: Maldives
- Original language: Divehi
- No. of seasons: 1
- No. of episodes: 5

Production
- Cinematography: Mohamed Hamza
- Editor: Hassan Nishath

Original release
- Release: April 7 – May 5, 2022

Shakuvaa is a Maldivian television series directed by Bahaulla Ibrahim. It stars Ahmed Easa, Nathasha Jaleel, Nuzuhath Shuaib and Mohamed Athik in main roles. The pilot episode of the series was released on 7 April 2022. The series consisting of five episodes, focuses on the conflicts and choices of a confused husband.

== Cast and characters ==
=== Main ===
- Ahmed Easa as Adheel
- Nathasha Jaleel as Amira
- Nuzuhath Shuaib as Rindha
- Mohamed Athik as Ziyan
- Mohamed Afrah as Siraj

=== Guest ===
- Hussain Nazim as Amira's friend (Episode 5)

== Episodes ==
| No. | Title | Directed by | Original release date |
|---|---|---|---|
| 1 | "Episode 1" | Bahaulla Ibrahim | April 7, 2022 |
After a busy schedule at office, Adheel comes home, where his wife, Amira decides to leave him due to his lack of affection towards her and their child, Ziyan. Amira departs to India where her family is, and Adheel starts taking care of Ziyan, while he keeps continuously questions Adheel for his actions. In the middle of chaos, he finds himself attracted to Rindha, a friend of his best friend's wife.
| 2 | "Episode 2" | Bahaulla Ibrahim | April 14, 2022 |
Adheel suggests to Ziyan on introducing Rindha as his mother, to which Ziyan agrees for the sake of his father's happiness. They later connect as a family at different occasions and events. Eventually, Rindha's family agrees to their marriage. Adheel's friend, Siraj uncovers a secret about Rindha which put him in a difficult situation.
| 3 | "Episode 3" | Bahaulla Ibrahim | April 21, 2022 |
Adheel and Rindha later reconcile and come to a mutual understanding about their priorities and requirements. Rindha discovers that Adheel has not divorced Amira, which concerns her. On confrontation, Adheel asks a serious question to Rindha which makes her highly uncomfortable. Meanwhile, Amira returns home much to everyone's surprise.
| 4 | "Episode 4" | Bahaulla Ibrahim | April 28, 2022 |
Rindha is clueless about her fate with Adheel. Amira is willing to change her attitude for the sake of her child. In the middle of chaos, Adheel is further stressed on losing his dream project. Amira makes peace with Rindha and accepts her in their life.
| 5 | "Episode 5" | Bahaulla Ibrahim | May 5, 2022 |
Rindha lashes out to Adheel for not giving time to her. Amira reunites with Adheel and they celebrate as a family.

== Soundtrack ==
Track listing
| No. | Title | Singer(s) | Length |
|---|---|---|---|
| 1. | "Shakuvaa" | Aminath Raya Ashraf |

== Release and reception ==
The first episode of the series was released on 7 April 2022 through Television Maldives, on the occasion of Ramadan 1443. The series received mixed to positive reviews from critics and viewers.
