= Hindhukolheh =

- Official film poster
- Directed by: Ali Shifau
- Written by: Ahmed Tholal
- Produced by: Mohamed Ali; Aishath Fuad Thaufeeq
- Starring: Sharaf Abdulla; Aminath Rashfa
- Cinematography: Ali Shifau; Ahmed Sinan
- Edited by: Ali Shifau
- Music by: Hassan Thowfeeq
- Production company: Dark Rain Entertainment
- Distributed by: Medianet
- Release date: 6 March 2023
- Country: Maldives
- Language: Dhivehi

Hindhukolheh (lit: moment) is a 2023 Maldivian film written by Ahmed Tholah and directed by Ali Shifau. Produced by Mohamed Ali and Aishath Fuad Thaufeeq under Dark Rain Entertainment, the film stars Sharaf Abdulla and Aminath Rashfa in pivotal roles.

== Plot ==
Imran is in love with one of his coworkers Kiara but Kiara is in a relationship with their married boss Shaahid a.k.a. Shaadu. Im an event which Shaadu promise would be for him and Kiara, Shaadu's wife Niyaza crash the party causing Kiara to lose her mind and act weird among other coworkers. Others mock Kiara whereas Imran stand by her. The office Staffs gossip about Kiara and Shaadu which make Imran furious. Imran's friend Miadh advice him to forget Kiara and move on. During an official trip, Shaadu promise to celebrate his birthday earlier with only Kiara but Niyaza foils the plan arriving at the conference. Kiara has a breakdown and goes out, where a coconut falls on her head causing her to lose her memory. Imran helps her recall everything as he is hopelessly in love with her. However after regaining her memory Kiara forgets about the things Imran did for her and goes with Shaadu which breaks Imran's heart.

== Cast ==
- Sharaf Abdulla as Imran Ali
- Aminath Rashfa as Kiara
- Ravee Farooq as Abdulla Shahid a.k.a. Shaadu
- Mariyam Majudha as Niyaza
- Ahmed Shakir as Miadh
- Aminath Shaana Saeed as Fathun
- Kate Gale as Doctor
- Mohamed Shivaz as Colleague
- Ahmed Mohamed as Colleague
- Aminath Shamraa as Colleague
- Mariyam Waheedha as Colleague
- Fathimath Latheefa as Imran's mother
- Mohamed Afrah as Counsellor
- Mohamed Rifshan as Counsellor
- Adam Rizwee (special appearance)
- Ibrahim Shiyaz (special appearance)
- Fathimath Zuhair (special appearance)
- Ahmed Sharif (special appearance)

== Development ==
The project was announced in March 2022, where it was announced that eighty percent of filming was completed from Dark Rain Entertainment's new romantic feature film titled Hindhukolheh. Filming was completed in April 2022.

On 16 September 2022, Dark Rain Entertainment released a cover version of the Maldivian iconic song "Lolakah Ninjeh Naadhey", penned by Easa Shareef and originally performed by Ali Rameez for the album Goyye (1999). Upon release, Rameez claimed the copyrights of the song on YouTube and criticised the production company for using his original work without his permission. Soon after, Dark Rain Entertainment personally and publicly apologized Rameez and announced that the song will not be used in any of their productions.

== Soundtrack ==
Track listing
| No. | Title | Lyrics | Music | Singer(s) | Length |
|---|---|---|---|---|---|
| 1. | "Hindhukolheh" | Ahmed Tholal | Hussain Thaufeeq | Azal Ali Zahir |
| 2. | "Yo!" | Shammoon Mohamed | | Equatic Vibe |
| 3. | "Handhuvaruthakun" | Abdul Sameeu Abdul Ghafoor; Ahmed Faseeh | Abdul Sameeu Abdul Ghafoor; Ahmed Faseeh | DJ Paide', Azal Ali Zahir, Mariyam Maisha, Aminath Saina Mohamed Rasheed |
| 4. | "Aadheys" | Ahmed Amir | | Ahmed Amir |
| 5. | "Hithugaa" | Fatho | | Mariyam Ashfa, Fatho | 4:18 |
| 6. | "Mi Hithuge Raani" | | Hussain Thaufeeq | The Clio | 3:53 |

== Release ==
The film was initially slated for a theatrical release, however, considering the demand of Olympus Cinema after its re-opening on 4 February 2023, Dark Rain Entertainment decided to premiere the fil on Medianet Multi Screen.

== Accolades ==
| Award | Category | Recipient(s) and nominee(s) | Result | Ref(s) |
|---|---|---|---|---|
| 1st MSPA Film Awards | Best Supporting Actor – Female | Mariyam Majudha | Nominated | |
| 1st MSPA Film Awards | Best Lyrics | Shammoon Mohamed for "Yo!" | Nominated | |
| 1st MSPA Film Awards | Best Choreography | Hussain Hazim | Nominated | |
| 1st MSPA Film Awards | Best Sound Engineer | Ali Shifau | Nominated | |
