= Varah Loabivey =

Maldivian web series

- Genre: Mystery
- Written by: Ilyas Waheed
- Directed by: Ilyas Waheed
- Starring: Washiya Mohamed; Ahmed Ifnaz Firag
- Music by: Mohamed Ikram
- Country of origin: Maldives
- Original language: Divehi
- No. of seasons: 1
- No. of episodes: 5

Production
- Cinematography: Samah Ibrahim
- Editor: Ilyas Waheed
- Running time: 18-25 minutes
- Production company: Ice Studio

Original release
- Network: MediaNet
- Release: July 7, 2025

Varah Loabivey is a Maldivian mystery drama mini web series written and directed by Ilyas Waheed. It stars Washiya Mohamed, Ahmed Ifnaz Firag, Nuzuhath Shuaib, Zaleeshan Samir and Hassan Samih Mohamed in main roles.

The series follows Shaana, who, years after escaping a stalker, starts a new job where eerie events and a fatal mistake force her to uncover the truth before she becomes the next victim. The series consisting a total of five episodes was released on 7 July 2025.

== Premise ==
Years after escaping a stalker, Shaana starts a new job, unaware he's now working in the same office. As strange events unfold, she suspects the wrong man who ends up dead. With danger closing in, Shaana must uncover the truth before she becomes the next victim.

== Cast and characters ==
=== Main ===
- Washiya Mohamed as Shaana Abdul Razzaq
- Ahmed Ifnaz Firag as Ibrahim Nisham Mahil; Shaana's colleague
- Nuzuhath Shuaib as Aisha; Shaana's boss
- Zaleeshan Samir as Firaz Easa; a detective
- Hassan Samih Mohamed as Zaakin; Shaana's husband

=== Recurring ===
- Mohamed Yamin Ali as Aslam; Shaana's ex-boyfriend
- Mariyam Waheedha as Nisha; Shaana's colleague
- Abdulla Aiman as Shahir; Shaana's colleague

== Episodes ==
No.	Title	Directed by	Original release date
1	"Enburi Aun"	Ilyas Waheed	July 7, 2025
Shaana's routine begins to unravel when she receives a chilling note that drags her back to a past she thought she had left behind. At her workplace, the arrival of a new colleague unsettles her—his presence stirs an uncanny sense of familiarity she cannot quite place. A chance encounter with her ex-boyfriend Aslam only adds to her growing unease, blurring the lines between coincidence and something more sinister. When the police suddenly reopen an old stalker case connected to her, Shaana is forced to confront the terrifying possibility that the shadows of her past are closer than ever.
2	"Emmen Akee Ves Suspects"	Ilyas Waheed	July 7, 2025
Aslam denies any link to the threatening note and clashes with Nisham, whom he suspects of stalking Shaana, but Nisham dismisses the accusation. Later, Aslam texts Shaana saying he knows who the stalker is, only for news to break soon after that he has fallen to his death. While Shaana fears the stalker is behind it, Detective Firaz finds no evidence of foul play. At work, Shaana is berated by her manager Aisha over an invoice error, but a chilling detail in the papers leaves her shaken. Nisham grows closer to Shaana while showing frustration toward Aisha, who is disturbed to learn he once worked with Shaana—a fact Shaana doesn’t recall. That night, Nisham violently attacks Aisha.
3	"Introducing Nisham"	Ilyas Waheed	July 7, 2025
Shaana reconnects with Nisham but quietly questions his sudden reappearance. Half-joking, she asks if he could be the stalker, since he had been around during her earlier ordeal and resurfaced only after returning to her life. Detective Firaz visits the office to question each staff member, while Aisha remains mysteriously absent, secretly hiding her injuries and trauma from Nisham’s attack the previous night. Later, Shaana meets Nisham for coffee, where their conversation takes a dark turn. After overhearing a phone call with Zaakin, Nisham probes her with unsettling questions, even suggesting Zaakin might be abusive. That night, Nisham secretly follows Zaakin.
4	"Aniyaa"	Ilyas Waheed	July 7, 2025
Shaana arrives at the office with minor facial injuries. Nisham takes her out for coffee, questioning what happened, and Shaana blames her husband, Zaakin. When Nisham urges her to leave him, she initially refuses, but after his persistent concern, she promises that she will end the relationship soon. That night, Shaana visits her mother’s house, unaware that Nisham has followed Zaakin. Nisham confronts Zaakin and violently attacks him, escalating the danger surrounding Shaana.
5	"Nimumeh Ge Feshun"	Ilyas Waheed	July 7, 2025
Firaz accuses Nisham, who denies it. Shaana and Firaz's secret bond is revealed, but they remain apart. Shaana, trapped in a loveless marriage, shocks everyone by exposing that she masterminded Zaakin's murder.

== Soundtrack ==
Track listing
No.	Title	Lyrics	Music	Singer(s)	Length
1.	"Varah Loabivey"	Asim Ali	Mohamed Ikram	Mohamed Abdul Ghanee

== Release and reception ==
The five-episode series was released on 7 June 2025 on MediaNet's VideoClub. It received positive reviews from critics, with Ilyas Waheed’s story and direction particularly praised for "constantly keeping the bar high". The performances of actors Ahmed Ifnaz Firag, Washiya Mohamed and Nuzuhath Shuaib were also widely commended.
