= Lasviyas =

2024 Maldivian film

- Official title poster
- Directed by: Mohamed Niyaz
- Written by: Mohamed Niyaz
- Screenplay by: Mohamed Niyaz
- Produced by: Ahmed Nasir; Ibrahim Rasheed; Mohamed Niyaz
- Starring: Zoya Hassan Ibrahim; Ahmed Easa; Washiya Mohamed
- Music by: Mohamed Ikram
- Production company: Eternal Pictures
- Release date: 12 April 2024
- Country: Maldives
- Language: Dhivehi

Lasviyas is a 2024 Maldivian film written and directed by Mohamed Niyaz. Produced by Ahmed Nasir, Ibrahim Rasheed and Niyaz under Eternal Pictures, the film stars Zoya Hassan Ibrahim, Ahmed Easa Mariyam Shifa and Washiya Mohamed in pivotal roles. The film was theatrically released on 12 April 2024.

== Premise ==
The film unfolds the poignant tale of Iqbal, a man on a journey of emotional rediscovery as he reconnects with his critically ill daughter, Hamra, after years of estrangement. Against the backdrop of Iqbal's turbulent past, the film delves into themes of love, loss, and reconciliation, focusing on his evolving relationship with Yusra, Hamra's mother. From initial conflicts to a deepening bond, their story highlights the power of forgiveness and personal transformation.

As Iqbal confronts his past demons, the narrative explores the healing journey of repairing broken relationships and the importance of letting go of past grievances for emotional growth. It serves as a poignant reminder of the human spirit's capacity for redemption and the transformative nature of forgiveness.

== Cast ==
- Mariyam Zoya Hassan as Hamra
- Ahmed Easa as Iqbal
- Washiya Mohamed as Yusra
- Thaathi Adam as Shimana
- Ahmed Ifnaz Firag as Javee
- Ahmed Asim as Fayyaz
- Fathimath Hamsha Yoosuf as Dr. Sheeneez
- Ibrahim Jihad as Zahid
- Aminath Shuha as Anee
- Aishath Shua Shaniz as Haleemath
- Aishath Almas Hassan as an oncologist
- Ahmed Jiliyan Rashad as Rocky
- Khadheeja Ibrahim Didi as Maastha
- Fauziyya Hassan as grandmother
- Fathimath Latheefa as Haseena
- Rizwana Mohamed Haleem as Rizu
- Ravee Farooq
- Abdulla Naseer as Ibrahimbe
- Reeko Moosa Manik as Mahir
- Fazil Fayaz as Haantey
- Mohamed Ma'an Ahmed Tholhath as Hamza
- Khadheeja Moosa as Zareena

== Production ==
=== Development ===
Lasviyas was announced on 14 February 2017 through a teaser trailer as the second directorial venture of Mohamed Niyaz, following his critically and commercially successful film Dheriyaa (1994). Additional details of the film were scheduled to be disclosed during the official launch ceremony in March 2018. However, the event was postponed due to delays in pre-production. Niyaz completed the script in September 2018. In the same month, it was revealed that the film's soundtrack would feature five songs.

=== Casting ===
Zoya Hassan Ibrahim, the daughter of actress Niuma Mohamed, was unveiled as a key cast member in the film. Casting auditions were conducted in 2019 and early 2020 to finalize the lead roles. In July 2020, Niyaz re-evaluated the casting process. On 29 July 2020, actor Ahmed Easa was finalized as the lead actor of the film. Primary casting was finalized few days later, by announcing television presenter, Mariyam Shifa as the lead actress of the film. In July 2022, Niyaz revealed that veteran actor Fauziyya Hassan was roped in to play a brief yet important role in the film, tailored specifically for her. As Hassan resided abroad during the filming period, Niyaz considered five other actresses for the role before she accepted it in June 2022. The film stands as Hassan's final cinematic work, as she died on 31 August 2022, while receiving medical treatment in. Reeko Moosa Manik was reported to play a small role in the film, originally intended for Koyya Hassan Manik who died from COVID-19 on 20 February 2021.

=== Filming ===
Filming was Lasviyas was initially slated to begin in 2018 but faced indefinite delays attributed to pre-production issues, including the finalization of the cast. The production team announced that the cast and crew will depart for filming in early 2020. However, the onset of the COVID-19 pandemic caused further postponements. Eventually, filming for Lasviyas kicked off on 11 March 2022 and continued until July 2022. The initial schedule of the filming took place in B. Kamadhoo. Subsequently, filming resumed on 8 October 2022. Filming was completed on 10 January 2024.

== Soundtrack ==
Track listing
No.	Title	Lyrics	Music	Singer(s)	Length
1.	"Dhuniye"	Ahmed Shakeb	Andhala Haleem, Mohamed Ikram, Abdul Baasith	Andhala Haleem	4:52
2.	"Kiyaaladhee"	Mausoom Shakir	Mohamed Ikram	Moosa Samaau, Mariyam Ashfa	4:44
3.	"Kaiveneege Amaazu"	Aminath Faiza	Mohamed Ikram	Mysha Didi	4:48

== Release ==
Lasviyas was announced to be theatrically released on 12 April 2024.
