= Loabin...? =

2025 Maldivian film

- Official film poster
- Directed by: Ilyas Waheed
- Written by: Ilyas Waheed
- Screenplay by: Ilyas Waheed
- Produced by: Ilyas Waheed; Thaathi Adam; Ahmed Ifnaz Firag; Mohamed Shifuan; Samaah Ibrahim
- Starring: Thaathi Adam; Ahmed Ifnaz Firag; Ahmed Sharif; Nuzuhath Shuaib; Ahmed Shakir; Aminath Rasheedha; Aishath Gulfa
- Cinematography: Samaah Ibrahim
- Edited by: Ilyas Waheed; Samaah Ibrahim
- Music by: Shahyd Legacy
- Production companies: IFilms; LightsOut Production; Ingenious Visual Factory; Pendulum Investments
- Release date: 6 August 2025
- Running time: 123 minutes
- Country: Maldives
- Language: Dhivehi

Loabin...? is a 2025 Maldivian romantic drama film written and directed by Ilyas Waheed. The film is collaboratively produced by IFilms, LightsOut Production and Ingenious Visual Factory. The film stars Thaathi Adam, Ahmed Ifnaz Firag, Ahmed Sharif, Nuzuhath Shuaib, Ahmed Shakir, Aminath Rasheedha and Aishath Gulfa in pivotal roles.

Based on true events, the film revolves around a young woman forced into prostitution by circumstances beyond her control, whose life takes a turn when she meets a man who sees her for who she truly is, sparking an unexpected romance. The film was released on 6 August 2025.

== Premise ==
Sitara, a young island woman, finds herself drawn to Aqeel, a man whose charm convinces her to marry him despite her mother Zoona’s constant disapproval. Moving to Malé with dreams of a better life, she soon discovers that Aqeel’s financial irresponsibility and reckless lifestyle leave them drowning in debt. In desperation, Aqeel is approached by businessman Shakeel, who proposes that Sitara be used to settle his obligations. Initially resistant, Aqeel eventually succumbs to pressure and threats from Shakeel’s gang, forcing Sitara into prostitution. What begins as a single night soon spirals into a recurring trade, with Aqeel exploiting his wife as a source of income. Within this dark world, Sitara meets Ziyad, a kind-hearted man whose compassion offers her a fleeting glimpse of hope and dignity. Yet as the cycle of betrayal and exploitation continues, her struggle becomes one of survival against circumstances designed to strip her of agency, leaving her caught between fleeting kindness and the crushing weight of a life without choices.

== Cast ==
- Thaathi Adam as Sitara
- Ahmed Sharif as Aqeel
- Ahmed Ifnaz Firag as Ziyad
- Nuzuhath Shuaib as Nuzu
- Ahmed Shakir as Shakeel
- Aminath Rasheedha as Ameena; Ziyad's mother
- Aishath Gulfa as Zoona; Sitara's mother
- Sara as Kia

== Development ==
On the occasion of its sixth anniversary, IFilms announced its next production venture, Loabin...? on 18 December 2024. Written and directed by Ilyas Waheed, the project was revealed to be the studio’s first romantic film.

A casting call for new talent was made on 6 April 2025. The main cast was officially announced on 19 May 2025, featuring Thaathi Adam, Ahmed Ifnaz Firag, Ahmed Sharif, Nuzuhath Shuaib and Ahmed Shakir in lead roles. For the role, Thaathi Adam underwent a physical transformation, losing sixteen kilos. Principal photography began on 1 May 2025 in N. Kendhikolhudhoo. Filming was completed within 28 days.

== Soundtrack ==
The first single from the film, titled Loluge Jazubaathun—a remake of the original song performed by Mohamed Shuhail—was released on 22 June 2025. The new version was performed by Ahmed Ifnaz Firag, with music composed by Ahmed Furqan. The title track of the film was later released on 17 July 2025, performed by Shammoon Mohamed and Aishath Maain Rasheed, composed by Shahyd Legacy, and written by Ilyas Waheed.

Track listing
No.	Title	Lyrics	Music	Singer(s)	Length
1.	"Lasvefa"	Asim Ali	Shahyd Legacy		3:52
2.	"Loabin"	Ilyas Waheed	Shahyd Legacy	Shammoon Mohamed, Aishath Maain Rasheed	3:30
3.	"Madu Madun"	Asim Ali	Shahyd Legacy		5:03
4.	"Ehaaraa Mihaaru"	Ilyas Waheed	Mohamed Ikram		4:26
5.	"Mee Vaahaka Eh"	Ilyas Waheed	Shahyd Legacy		4:22
6.	"Loluge Jazubaathun"	Mohamed Shuhail	Ahmed Furqan	Ahmed Ifnaz Firag	4:00

== Release and reception ==
The film was theatrically released on 6 August 2025. The film received positive reviews from critics. Aishath Areena from Dhen applauded the work of Ilyas Waheed and wrote: "Loabin...? bravely tackles a taboo subject in Maldivian society, portraying the grim reality of exploitation with raw honesty and emotional depth. Anchored by Thaathi Adam's transformative performance, the film delivers a powerful message of redemption, forgiveness, and second chances. While modest in scale, its heartfelt storytelling and resonant themes leave a lasting impact well beyond the closing credits".
