= Abadhah =

2025 Maldivian film

- Official film poster
- Directed by: Moomin Fuad
- Written by: Moomin Fuad
- Screenplay by: Moomin Fuad
- Produced by: Hussain Nooradeen
- Starring: Yoosuf Shafeeu; Ismail Rasheed; Washiya Mohamed; Ahmed Sharif; Soozan Ibrahimfulhu
- Cinematography: Ibrahim Wisan
- Edited by: Jazlaan Hameed
- Music by: Mohamed Ikram
- Production company: Noor N Movie
- Release date: 28 April 2025
- Country: Maldives
- Language: Dhivehi

Abadhah is a 2025 film written and directed by Moomin Fuad. Produced by Hussain Nooradeen under Noor N Movie, the film stars Yoosuf Shafeeu, Ismail Rasheed, Washiya Mohamed, Ahmed Sharif and Soozan Ibrahimfulhu in pivotal roles. The film was released on 28 April 2025 and received mainly positive reviews.

== Cast ==
- Yoosuf Shafeeu as Amru
- Ismail Rasheed as Jamaal
- Washiya Mohamed as Haifa
- Ahmed Sharif as Looth
- Soozan Ibrahimfulhu as Faruzana; Haifa's mother
- Fathimath Visama as Mahaa
- Saamee Hussain Didi as Ayaan

== Development ==
Following the narratives of Heylaa (2006) and Loodhifa (2011), which depict crimes occurring in Malé city, Moomin Fuad was inspired to write a similar genre for his next production. During the lockdown following the COVID-19 pandemic, Fuad began working on the script for Abadhah.

The project was announced on 15 May 2024 as another reunion by the team of Loodhifa (2011), marking the second collaboration of producer Hussain Nooradeen, director Moomin Fuad and actor Ismail Rasheed. Yoosuf Shafeeu was reported to play an important character in the film, who agreed for the role for "his trust on Moomin Fuad's credibility". Additional cast of the film include, Washiya Mohamed, Ahmed Sharif and Soozan Ibrahimfulhu. The project was initially scheduled to release on 1 July 2024, which was later pushed. Post-production of the film started in May 2024. The project was completed by August 2024.

The project with a new release date was launched on 26 February 2025. All the technical parts of the film including mastering are completed by Orkeyz Inc.

== Soundtrack ==
Track listing
No.	Title	Music	Singer(s)	Length
1.	"Hayaathakun"	Fatho	Fatho, Ali Iufaaf Ismail	3:53

== Release and reception ==
The film was released on 28 April 2025. Upon release, the film received positive reviews from critics and audiences. In a post-release coverage shared by MuniAvas, Ahmed Rasheed praised the performances of the five lead actors in the film, particularly highlighting Ahmed Sharif and Susan Ibrahim Fulhu for bringing their characters to life. He also commended Moomin Fuad for his screenplay and the impactful dialogues incorporated into the narration.

Ahmed Mizyal, writing for Dhauru, particularly praised Soozan Ibrahim Fulhu’s performance, stating that she "overshadowed" all other actors with her powerful portrayal. Describing the film as a thriller that will be talked about for years to come, he highlighted its open ending as a cliffhanger that leaves the audience "begging for a part two".
