= Hinthaa =

Maldivian web series

- Created by: Hassan Shazil
- Written by: Ahmed Zareer
- Screenplay by: Ahmed Zareer
- Directed by: Ravee Farooq
- Starring: Aishath Raaisha; Saamee Hussain Didi; Roanu Hassan Manik; Thaathi Adam; Ahmed Shakir; Mohamed Afrah
- Music by: Shahyd Legacy
- Composer: Munaz Zubair
- Country of origin: Maldives
- Original language: Divehi
- No. of seasons: 1
- No. of episodes: 10

Production
- Producer: Hassan Shazil
- Cinematography: Ibrahim Sujau
- Editor: Ahmed Zareer
- Running time: 23-35 minutes
- Production company: Ehkaaf Production

Original release
- Release: January 30 – March 27, 2025

Hinthaa is a Maldivian corporate thriller web series directed by Ravee Farooq. It stars Aishath Raaisha and Saamee Hussain Didi in lead roles while Roanu Hassan Manik, Thaathi Adam, Ahmed Shakir and Mohamed Afrah in supporting roles. The pilot episode of the series was released on 30 January 2025. The series follows a happily married power couple whose marriage falls into downfall with the corporate politics.

== Premise ==
Hinthaa follows the story of Yumna and Shiyaz, a power couple whose marriage is put to the test when Yumna uncovers a deeply rooted web of corruption within the nation's largest oil company.

== Cast and characters ==
=== Main ===
- Aishath Raaisha as Yumna
- Saamee Hussain Didi as Ali Shiyaz; Sales and Marketing Director
- Roanu Hassan Manik as Azeez
- Thaathi Adam as Firusha
- Ahmed Shakir as Ahmed Nooh Abdul Sattar
- Mohamed Afrah as Mohamed Saeed; PR Manager
- Rashfa Farooq as Abee

=== Recurring ===
- Ravee Farooq as Azhar
- Mohamed Rasheed as Najeeb
- Hazif Mohamed as Jinah
- Mariyam Haleem as Shirumeena
- Ahmed Saeed as Haleem
- Ahmed Ifnaz Firag as Manik
- Mohamed Manik as Boss
- Sheela Najeeb as Najuma; Yumna's mother

=== Guest ===
- Inayath Ali as a television host (Episode: "Untie")
- Zaeeshan as a podcast host (Episode: "Untie")
- Ilyas Waheed as Suheil; Chief Internal Auditor (Episode: "Relationship Strained")
- Shahudha Mahmoodh as news presenter (Episode: "Unexpected Reunion")

== Episodes ==
| No. | Title | Directed by | Original release date |
|---|---|---|---|
| 1 | "Untie" | Ravee Farooq | January 30, 2025 |
Yumna and Shiyaz's high-profile divorce has become the talk of social media, captivating audiences like a real-life drama. But just as the tension seemed to peak, Yumna dropped a bombshell—an offer that was as alluring as it was shrouded in suspicion.
| 2 | "Rises to Power" | Ravee Farooq | January 30, 2025 |
Azeez, Yumna's uncle and her late father's most trusted confidant, steps out of the shadow with a calculated move. As Yumna rises to power as the new CEO of Eagle Petco, the nation's largest oil empire, Azeez begins to meddle, blurring the lines between family loyalty and corporate ambition.
| 3 | "Relationship Strained" | Ravee Farooq | February 6, 2025 |
As Yumna steps into her new role as CEO of Eagle Petco, the weight of her decisions begins to strain her relationship with Shiyaz, unraveling the fragile bond they still share.
| 4 | "Storm on the Horizon" | Ravee Farooq | February 13, 2025 |
Yumna's decision to marry Shiyaz feels like a storm brewing on the horizon. To Azeez, its more than a personal choice-its a challenge to the legacy of her late father, Najeeb, built with unwavering principles.
| 5 | "Shocking Demand" | Ravee Farooq | February 20, 2025 |
Yumna is determined to persuade Azeez to reconsider his resignation, but her confrontation takes an unexpected turn when Azeez presents a shocking demand.
| 6 | "Shockwaves" | Ravee Farooq | February 27, 2025 |
Yumna's bold decision to fire key employees at Eagle Petco sends shockwaves through the company, leaving Shiyaz stunned and pushing their relationship to the brink.
| 7 | "Dangerous Game" | Ravee Farooq | March 6, 2025 |
In a last-ditch effort to stop Yumna, Nooh teams up with MP Manik, playing a dangerous game of manipulation that threatens to alter the course of every
| 8 | "The Rival" | Ravee Farooq | March 13, 2025 |
As Yumna works tirelessly to build a case against the culprits behind the corruption within Eagle Petco, MP Manik secretly offers classified information to a rival, plotting to bring down the oil empire.
| 9 | "Suspicious Offer" | Ravee Farooq | March 20, 2025 |
Yumna offers Shiyaz a lucrative financial deal to divorce her, but his suspicions rise as he senses something deeper at play. Meanwhile, Azeez is stunned by the unexpected return of an old enemy.
| 10 | "Unexpected Reunion" | Ravee Farooq | March 27, 2025 |
Just as Yumna believes she has succeeded in bringing the culprits to justice, an unexpected reunion emerges, threatening to unravel everything she has fought for.

== Development ==
Following the success of the crime thriller web series, Gareena (2023), Ehkaaf Production announced their next venture, another thriller web series Hinthaa which was announced to be directed by Ravee Farooq. The series is set to debut actors Aishath Raisha and Saamee Hussain Didi in the leading roles.

== Soundtrack ==
Track listing
| No. | Title | Lyrics | Music | Singer(s) | Length |
|---|---|---|---|---|---|
| 1. | "Loabi Loabi Loaiybekey" | Mohamed Abdul Ghanee | Ibrahim Zaid Ali | Ahmed Iqyan Rafeeu, Aishath Juni Jinah |

== Release and reception ==
The first two episode of the series were released on 30 January 2025. The series received positive reviews from critics, with actor Aishath Raaisha's performance being particularly praised for its "strong and powerful" portrayal.
