= Netheemey =

Maldivian web series

- Written by: Moomin Fuad
- Directed by: Moomin Fuad
- Music by: Fathuhulla Abdul Fathah
- Country of origin: Maldives
- Original language: Divehi
- No. of seasons: 1
- No. of episodes: 5

Production
- Producers: Mohamed Mirusan; Abdulla Hafiz
- Cinematography: Husseyn Adnan
- Editor: Azmy Abdulla

Original release
- Release: September 29 – October 27, 2022

Netheemey is a Maldivian romantic crime web series written and directed by Moomin Fuad. It stars Ahmed Sharif and Washiya Mohamed in main roles. The pilot episode of the series was released on 29 September 2022. The series follows an irresponsible, spoilt kid who moves away from his family with his wife only to reunite with his ex-lover living in the opposite apartment.

== Cast and characters ==
=== Main ===
- Ahmed Sharif as Hassan Raqib
- Nathasha Jaleel as Hudha
- Ismail Rasheed as Adheel
- Washiya Mohamed as Sausan
- Ahmed Asim as Rizvi
- Ismail Zahir as Khalid
- Mariyam Shakeela as Zuleykha
- Imadh Ali as Jinah
- Mariyam Majudha as Soany

=== Recurring ===
- Salava Sarah Ahmed Shammaan Nazeer
- Hussain Nazim as Shaggy; Sausan's friend
- Fathimath Visama as Mai; Sausan's friend
- Shaanih Ali as Micky; Sausan's friend
- Fathimath Latheefa as Nafeesa; Sausan's step-mother
- Aisha Ali as Sausan's step-sister
- Ali Farooq as Sausan's father
- Ali Fizam as Sufian

=== Guest ===
- Khadheeja Kiyara Ibrahim
- Abdulla Rasheed Moosa
- Fazeel Ali
- Husseyn Adnan
- Ahmed Adam
- Parvathee Khadche
- Mohamed Rafeeu
- Ahmed Shiyam
- Mohamed Ziyad
- Ali Rasheed
- Muslima Hassan
- Aishath Anjal
- Mariyam Azka Ahmed Shaukath
- Ansham Mohamed
- Ibrahim Muneez
- Mohamed Musthafa
- Zack Ahmed
- Aishath Razaan Ramiz
- Mohamed Ajuvadhu
- Azmy Adam

== Episodes ==
| No. | Title | Directed by | Original release date |
|---|---|---|---|
| 1 | "Edhuvas Hingajje" | Moomin Fuad | September 29, 2022 |
A complicated couple, Hassan and Hudha moves to a new apartment and they are greeted by the landlord, Adheel, briefing do's and dont's. The next morning, he meets their neighbor, Rizvi and Sausan, where he is instantly triggered by the latter's presence. As he comes back from office, Sausan knocks on the door and he refuses to let her in. It is later revealed that Hassan had previously been in a relationship with Sausan and his marriage with Hudha was a commitment made to his mother. Hassan insists Hudha not to befriend with their neighbors. Meanwhile, he experiences emotional trauma as he is never appreciated by his father. However later that day, his father announced that Hassan is credited with two-third of the shares of his father's construction company due to his recent valued contribution to the company.
| 2 | "Nunimunu Inthizaaru" | Moomin Fuad | October 6, 2022 |
Hassan continues having an affair with Sausan and is equally disturbed by Rizvi's abusive behavior towards her. Hassan advises Sausan to leave her husband and declares that he is ready to accept her at any cost. Since Hassan's parents made peace with him, Hudha requests to relocate to their house, but Hassan insists to wait a little longer. Unable to contact Sausan, Hassan pays a visit to her ex-bestfriend, Soany, who discloses to him that once her relationship ends with Hassan year ago, she moved to Sri Lanka with an alleged underworld don, Sufian and was imprisoned there before marrying to Rizvi. A flashback reveals how Hassan and Sausan meets in a club five years ago and how she ends her relationship with him criticizing his lack of responsibilities.
| 3 | "Nuvinama Ishq" | Moomin Fuad | October 13, 2022 |
Despite his several efforts to hate Sausan, all emotions bring Hassan closer to her. He begs her to come back to his life though she hesitates. Hassan goes to extreme measures from stabbing himself to attempting suicide, hoping to win her love. Flashback goes back to the same club party but from Sausan's perspective and what leads to there. After a one night stand with Hassan, Sausan is rescued by Hassan from her brutal step-mother and introduces her to his life.
| 4 | "Neh Nimun Mi Loaehbakah" | Moomin Fuad | October 20, 2022 |
In flashbacks, Sausan is seen to be in a live-in relationship with Hassan. As things were going smooth, Hassan's mother invites them only to reveal his lack of maturity and that he is flaunting a sum of money being saved for another purpose. Defamed and disgusted by the truth, Sausan breaks off his relationship with Hassan. Later that day, triggered by what Hassan says about his family, his mother, Zuleykha empowers him and re-introduces him to the family business. In the present, Sausan and Hassan were reminiscing about their life when Rizvi makes an unexpected comeback from work. Hassan makes a narrow escape back to his apartment but Hudha's interrogation about his disappearance heats up things between them. Meanwhile, Rizvi finds out that someone has broken in to their apartment while they were gone and starts his own investigation.
| 5 | "Alun Feshee" | Moomin Fuad | October 27, 2022 |
Adheel checks CCTV footage and finds out about Hassan's invasion into Rizvi's apartment but decides to conceal the truth from Rizvi. Zuleykha warns Hassan to never break Hudha's heart and invites them back to their building. Hudha agrees and starts packing, while Hassan decides to stay back. Calling their marriage a commitment to his mother, Hassan ultimately divorces her. Flashback reveals the circumstances which led Sausan to cut ties with Hassan, what made her strong in spite of all the odds and how she met Sufian and his violence. In the present, Hudha packs her belongings and exits the building only to be stopped by her past.

== Development ==
The project was announced on 10 August 2022 with the first trailer, as the next directorial venture by Moomin Fuad. Revealing the lead cast as Ahmed Sharif, Washiya Mohamed and Nathasha Jaleel, Fuad announced that the first season of the series consists of total five episodes. Filming for the series took place in Male' and post-production was completed in August 2022. During the time, Fuad shared that he anticipates to commence filming for the second season latest by October 2022.

== Soundtrack ==
Track listing
| No. | Title | Lyrics | Music | Singer(s) | Length |
|---|---|---|---|---|---|
| 1. | "Maazee" | Fathuhulla Abdul Fathah | Fathuhulla Abdul Fathah | Ali Iufaaf Ismail, Zoya Hassan |
| 2. | "Netheemey" | Moomin Fuad | Paighde | Paighde, Thu, Rifu |

== Release and reception ==
The first episode of the series was released on 29 September 2022 through Baiskoafu. Upon release the series received mainly positive reviews from critics, where its screenplay and direction by Moomin Fuad was particularly praised: "There are several unresolved questions that we need answers from. A second season with these answers are all what the audience need right now".

Last episode of the first season reveals the tentative date for the release of second season as April 2023.
