= Nina (2023 film) =

2023 Maldivian film

- Official film poster
- Directed by: Ilyas Waheed
- Written by: Ilyas Waheed
- Screenplay by: Ilyas Waheed
- Produced by: Asim Ali; Ahmed Wahyd; Ilyas Waheed
- Starring: Nuzuhath Shuaib; Sharaf Abdulla
- Cinematography: Ibrahim Wisan
- Edited by: Ahmed Ameed; Mohamed Sami
- Music by: Hussain Thaufeeq
- Production company: IFilms
- Release date: 6 August 2023
- Running time: 115 minutes
- Country: Maldives
- Language: Dhivehi

Nina is a 2023 Maldivian crime thriller film directed by Ilyas Waheed. Produced by Asim Ali and Ahmed Wahyd under IFilms, the film stars Nuzuhath Shuaib in title role while debutant Sharaf Abdulla, Mariyam Rasheedha and Mariyam Shakeela feature in pivotal roles.

== Premise ==
Nina, a gym and martial arts instructor, finds solace in a relationship with Hamdh, a friend. However, her life is disrupted by a dramatic event, leaving her beaten and broken. Nina must find revenge seeking justice for those responsible.

== Cast ==
- Nuzuhath Shuaib as Aishath Nina Hussain
- Sharaf Abdulla as Hamdhu
- Mohamed Nial Naasih as Kaif
- Mohamed Jumayyil as Zafar "Farey"
- Hamdhoon Farooq as Ali "Albo"
- Mariyam Rasheedha as Latheefa
- Hassan Saamih Mohamed as John
- Ibrahim Shaif as Simhadh "Sippalhey"
- Hassan Sinan as Mode
- Hassan Zaidh as Kaattey
- Ali Yooshau as Ahmed Adhil
- Nathasha Jaleel as Abidha
- Aisha Ali as Marie
- Ali Inaz as Asadh
- Mariyam Shakeela as Shareefa
- Adam Rizwee as Isse
- Mohamed Arusham as Car Driver
- Abdulla Arim as John's brother
- Hussain Sameeh as Shiham
- Mohamed Shaavy as Amir
- Hawwa Shaazna as Doctor
- Ahmed Rasheedh as Doctor
- Ahmed Ifnaz Firag as news presenter (Special appearance)
- Mariyam Azza as Azza in the item number "Azza" (Special appearance)
- Aishath Rishmy (Special appearance)
- Ravee Farooq (Special appearance)

== Development ==
Following the success of Bavathi (2019), director Ilyas Waheed announced Nina in August 2019 with a cast including Nuzuhath Shuaib, debutant Sharaf Abdulla and Mohamed Jumayyil. After completing the shoot in Male', the cast and crew departed to Laamu atoll on 4 February 2020. As required for the film, Shuaib trained in martial arts. Shooting for the film ended in March 2020. In mid-2020, it was reported that veteran actress Mariyam Rasheedha has joined the cast of the film after a break of more than two decades. Following the child abuse allegation over Jumayyil, the production studio severed ties with him and affirmed that he will not be involved in the marketing and promotion of the film, though no confirmation was given by the studio if his role will be retained in the film or replaced. Filming was completed in early 2021.

== Soundtrack ==
Track listing
No.	Title	Lyrics	Music	Singer(s)	Length
1.	"Alifaan"	Ilyas Waheed, Asim Ali	Ismail Adheel Mistee	Andhalaa Haleem	3:54
2.	"Aa Ummeedh"	Mohamed Abdul Ghanee	Hussain Thaufeeq	Mariyam Ashfa	4:31
3.	"Azza"	Mohamed Abdul Ghanee	Hussain Thaufeeq	Mariyam Ashfa, Mohamed Abdul Ghanee, Ahmed Ifnaz Firag	3:59
4.	"Alvidhaa"	Ilyas Waheed	Hussain Thaufeeq	Jaisha Waheed

== Release and response ==
The film was scheduled for theatrical release in late 2020, but was postponed due to the COVID-19 pandemic.

Officially launching the film on 31 May 2023, the director announced the release date of the film as 6 August 2023. Following its release, the film garnered extensive acclaim from critics. Akram Abdulla of Dhauru lauded Nuzuhath Shuaib's portrayal of the resolute protagonist, highlighting her embodiment of an unapologetically strong woman within a narrative that is deemed less substantial. Barring few scenes, Abdulla considered the film to offer an overall "thrilling experience".

== Accolades ==
Award	Category	Recipient(s) and nominee(s)	Result	Ref(s)
1st MSPA Film Awards	Best Film	Nina	Nominated	
1st MSPA Film Awards	Best Director	Ilyas Waheed	Nominated	
1st MSPA Film Awards	Best Lead Actor – Female	Nuzuhath Shuaib	Nominated	
1st MSPA Film Awards	Best Negative Role	Hamdhoon Farooq	Nominated	
1st MSPA Film Awards	Best Playback Singer – Female	Mariyam Ashfa for "Aa Ummeedh"	Nominated	
1st MSPA Film Awards	Best Lyrics	Mohamed Abdul Ghanee for "Aa Ummeedh"	Won	
1st MSPA Film Awards	Best Story	Ilyas Waheed	Nominated	
1st MSPA Film Awards	Best Makeup – Glamour	Ruthuba Ahmed	Nominated	
1st MSPA Film Awards	Best Makeup – Special Effects	Ruthuba Ahmed	Nominated	
1st MSPA Film Awards	Best Sound Engineer	Ahmed Shahudh	Nominated	
1st MSPA Film Awards	Background Score	Ahmed Shaheed	Nominated	
