= Lafuzu =

Maldivian web series

- Screenplay by: Mariyam Moosa
- Directed by: Ahmed Nimal
- Country of origin: Maldives
- Original language: Divehi
- No. of seasons: 2
- No. of episodes: 32

Production
- Producer: Mohamed Abdulla
- Cinematography: Ali Rasheed
- Editor: Ali Rasheed
- Production company: Dhekedheke Ves Production

Original release
- Release: February 26, 2022 – August 13, 2023

Lafuzu is a Maldivian family drama web series written by Mariyam Moosa and directed by Ahmed Nimal. It stars Mariyam Shifa, Ali Azim and Adam Saeed in main roles. The pilot episode of the series was released on 26 February 2022.

== Cast and characters ==
=== Main ===
- Mariyam Shifa as Laika
- Ali Azim as Akif
- Adam Saeed as Ahmed Yazan Ali
- Fathimath Latheefa as Zareena
- Aishath Thuhufa as Nadha
- Arifa Ali as Rasheedha
- Abdulla Naseer as Husnee

=== Recurring ===
- Ahmed Nimal as Ali Shareef "Alibe"
- Mariyam Shakeela as Samihtha
- Hassan Zivaan
- Aishath Yasna
- Aishath Mahmoodh
- Yoosuf Yuaan as young Yumnu
- Looth Laizaan as young Nihadh
- Ramsha Ibrahim as young Laika
- Mohamed Afrah as Jalaal

=== Guest ===
- Hawwa Shadhiya as Aathi (Episode 2)

== Episodes ==
Season	Episodes	Originally released	
Season	Episodes	First released	Last released
1	15	February 26, 2022	June 4, 2022
2	17	April 30, 2023	August 13, 2023

No.	Title	Directed by	Original release date
1	"Episode 1"	Ahmed Nimal	February 26, 2022
Rashidha, who is expecting a third child, suffers from mental ailment and neglects her two children, Nihad and Laika. Her prospects have fallen into disrepair where she no longer cares about herself and takes out her frustration and anger on her children. Nihad, puzzled, keeps asking his aunt Zareena why his father despises him so much, to which Zareena has no explanation. Laika was raped when she was six years old, but the perpetrator remains unknown to date. Since that traumatic night, little Laika's life was never the same. She is getting nightmares that have kept her awake at night for the past 12 years.
2	"Episode 2"	Ahmed Nimal	March 5, 2022
Laika is always scared feeling anxious because of her traumatic childhood experience. Akif and Yazan take a trip to Laika's island for a sports coaching program, during which Yazan meets Laika by accident, with whom he falls in love with right away.
3	"Episode 3"	Ahmed Nimal	March 12, 2022
From her conversation with the school principal, Laika hears of Yazan and Akif's stay at her home. She feels furious at her grandma for letting Yazan and Akif stay at her house. However, because the coaching program is a school activity, she decides to let go of her anger. Laika continues to have nightmares. One of such nights she catches a glimpse a show from her window. Yazan catches after someone who bursts into Laika's house, searching the streets. and bumps into Husnee gasping for breath.
4	"Episode 4"	Ahmed Nimal	March 19, 2022
Laika shares her emotions with her grandmother, worried and distressed after Husness raises an unexpected question to her. Meanwhile, Rashidha taunts Laika and yells at her, making her feel miserable, although she fears of losing Laika.
5	"Episode 5"	Ahmed Nimal	March 26, 2022
Yazan asks questions to Laika about Nihadh. In the middle of the conversation, Yazan holds Laika's hand, which disgusts her and drives her to slap Yazan. Laika notices Alibe staring at her while she practices basketball and football on the court. Scared, she shares the incident with Yumna on the way home. Halfway home, Akif takes Laika on his cycle away from others. When Laika was doing some sketching at the beach, she noticed someone standing behind him. Laika looks at him, terrified, after seeing the person.
6	"Episode 6"	Ahmed Nimal	April 2, 2022
When Alibe attempts to grasp Laika's hand, Yazan stops him and holds Alibe's hand. He then pushes Alibe after warning him to stay away from Laika. Rasheed is anxious after receiving repeated anonymous calls. Yaza, who is fantasizing about Laika, overhears Akif sleeping and starts asking about her. In response, Akif confesses his love for Laika, claiming he sees him having a wonderful time with her, which spoils Yazan's mood.
7	"Episode 7"	Ahmed Nimal	April 9, 2022
Alibe warns Husnee to hold the situation tight and to follow his plan. Laika finds herself confused about her relationship with Yaza. Akif realizes Yazan and Laika share a bond much to his dismay.
8	"Episode 8"	Ahmed Nimal	April 16, 2022
Akif confesses his love for Laika which she respectfully declines. Akif further warns Yazan to stay away from Laika while the latter is strongly determined to win her love at any cost. Husnee orders Rasheedha to marry Laika off to someone as she is recently much closer to Akif and Yazan.
9	"Episode 9"	Ahmed Nimal	April 23, 2022
Alibe confronts Yazan on the road and attempts to attack him. Yazan, on the other hand, manages to escape the attack. Yazan sees the scar on Alibe's forehead and reminds him of the incident. Alive is taken aback by the Yazan's questions and becomes curious to learn more about him. Laika becomes worried because she does not understand why Yazan is upset with her. Laika is puzzled when she notices Yazan's chain.
10	"Episode 10"	Ahmed Nimal	April 30, 2022
Yazan reveals his past and identity which brings Laika closer to him. Husnee is suspicious of Laika's grandmother's plan on estate settlement. Alibe rebuffs Yazan's claim as a resident of the island.
11	"Episode 11"	Ahmed Nimal	May 7, 2022
Rasheedha visits Laika's house and Akif tries but fails to warm up their dull interaction. Yazan finally decides to marry Laika and informs his family of the same. Yazan with no hesitation confronts Alibe much to the pleasant surprise of Akif and Laika.
12	"Episode 12"	Ahmed Nimal	May 14, 2022
Akif is determined to win Laika's heart in spite of his relationship with Yazaan and other obstacles. Zareena shares Alibe's filthy intention of marrying Laika to Rasheedha.
13	"Episode 13"	Ahmed Nimal	May 21, 2022
Laika's grandmother confronts Jalaal for not returning the love and affection Laika yearns from her parents. Rasheedha invites Yazaan, Akif, Nadha and Laika to their house, where the latter recalls her past memories with Rasheedha and Husnee. Alibe makes a surprise visit to their house much to the discomfort of Laika. Rasheedha confronts Alibe regarding his intention on marrying Laika which he proudly acknowledges. Frustrated, she voiced against Alibe and he firmly decides to avenge on Rasheedha for the humiliation.
14	"Episode 14"	Ahmed Nimal	May 28, 2022
Yazan departs to Male' and remains unavailable for two weeks. One such night, Laika gets raped by an unknown person whose identity Laika refuses to disclose. Chain of unfortunate events continue as Laika's grandmother dies and she feels completely helpless and alone.
15	"Episode 15"	Ahmed Nimal	June 4, 2022
Akif assaults Alibe, suspecting him to be rapist. Husnee forbids Rasheedha from seeing her daughter. When Laika loses all her hope to survive, Akif proposes to marry Laika and agrees to accept her daughter as his own. Four months later, Akif and Laika lives a happy married life until Yazaan makes a surprise comeback in their life.

== Soundtrack ==
Track listing
No.	Title	Lyrics	Music	Singer(s)	Length
1.	"Lafuzu"	Adam Haleem Adnan	Hussain Sobah	Mumthaz Moosa, Aminath Raya Ashraf

== Release and reception ==
The series was made available for streaming through Medianet Multi Screen on 26 February 2022. The first two episodes of the series received mixed reviews from critics.
