= Dharaka =

Maldivian web series

- Genre: Crime thriller
- Written by: Azhan Ibrahim
- Directed by: Azhan Ibrahim
- Music by: Shahyd Legacy
- Country of origin: Maldives
- Original language: Divehi
- No. of seasons: 1
- No. of episodes: 8

Production
- Executive producers: Asim Ali; Amira Ali; Ilyas Waheed
- Cinematography: Ismail Munawar; Ahmed Zifaaf
- Editor: Azhan Ibrahim
- Production company: Kazmik International

Original release
- Release: 8 April – 27 May 2022

Dharaka is a Maldivian crime thriller web series written and directed by Azhan Ibrahim. Produced by Kazmik International, it stars Ahmed Ifnaz Firag, Washiya Mohamed, and Susan Ibrahim Fulhu in main roles.

The series revolves around a high-profile case of the disappearance of a politician's daughter. The story twists and turns as an investigation officer tries to piece together the events leading up to the disappearance and the secrets behind the people involved.

== Cast and characters ==
=== Main ===
- Ahmed Ifnaz Firag as Nawal
- Washiya Mohamed as Nisha Sameer
- Susan Ibrahim Fulhu as Nazima Shakir
- Aisha Ali as Ana; Nisha's best friend
- Ibrahim Jihad as Firushan; husband of Nazima Shakir

=== Recurring ===
- Nathasha Jaleel as Fazla
- Ali Usam as Zayan; Nisha's boyfriend
- Mohamed Afrah as Sameer; Nisha's father
- Ismail Waheed as Ahmed
- Fathimath Visama as Iyadha; Nisha's former bestfriend
- Adhuham Layaal Qasim as Raaee
- Shaanih Ali Naseem as Peepu
- Ali Nadheeh as Vildhaan
- Ahmed Nahil as Iyadha's friend

== Episodes ==
No.	Title	Directed by	Original release date
1	"Raiy Lafu"	Azhan Ibrahim	April 8, 2022
An urgent and sensitive case is presented to Nawal, an Investigative officer. The daughter of a prominent MP, Nazima Shakir, has gone missing. Inquiries are opened and events start to unfold, leading up to the night of disappearance.
2	"Bunyaadhu"	Azhan Ibrahim	April 15, 2022
No stone is left unturned as Nawal brings forth all the individuals involved in Nisha's life. Different versions of the event of the night of the disappearance are relayed to Nawal while he tries to figure the truth behind it and each of their agenda behind it.
3	"Awaamendhuru"	Azhan Ibrahim	April 22, 2022
The conflict between the ex-boyfriend, Rai, and the current boyfriend, Zayan, prior to Nisha's disappearance comes to light. Nisha's former best friend, Iyadha, reveals a secret and taboo relationship with Nisha while her current best friend contradicts the story of Iyadha.
4	"Ikhthiyaaru"	Azhan Ibrahim	April 30, 2022
Nishan and Firushan's relationship comes to light when Nawal confronts him. The truth about them is revealed, yet Nawal is still no closer to finding out what happened to Nisha. Further inquiry threatens to reveal more family secrets.
5	"Sirru"	Azhan Ibrahim	May 6, 2022
The legitimacy of Nisha's birth is questioned, and Nisha's dad, Sameer, reveals the reasons behind the divorce between him and Nazima. Meanwhile, Nawal's busy nature becomes ever so detrimental to his personal life. Ana reveals information that sheds new light on the investigation.
6	"Heki"	Azhan Ibrahim	May 13, 2022
Nisha's body is discovered, along with it a watch. Firushan is brought back to inquiry. Meanwhile, Iyadha feels guilty about a recent event and wants to meet Ana. She is caught lying to Nawal. Nawal discovers new footage of Nisha and Iyadha. Nazima's bodyguard, Ahmed is brought into inquiry. The owner of the watch is revealed.
7	"Rahumaiytheriya"	Azhan Ibrahim	May 20, 2022
Ana becomes involved in something shady. Nawal plays a trick of his own to get more information about Nazima and Ahmed. Ana reveals yet more secrets that might play a big part in the disappearance of Nisha, and in turn, Nawal learns that Ana is hiding. Nawal finally gets access to some missing CCTV footage. Pieces of the puzzle finally start to fall in place.
8	"Fahu Raalhu"	Azhan Ibrahim	May 27, 2022
Nawal plays his final move, to confirm his suspicions. The picture is on the verge of being complete. Everything is in place to finally bring to light what happened to Nisha and hold the people responsible accountable. Truth is finally within Nawal's grip.

== Soundtrack ==
Track listing
No.	Title	Lyrics	Music	Singer(s)	Length
1.	"Dharaka"	Azhan Ibrahim, Asim Ali	Shaheed Legacy	Manaal Sadhath, Ahmed Ifnaz Firag

== Release and reception ==
On 15 March 2022, it was announced that the series would be made available for streaming on MediaNet Multi Screen platform from 8 April 2022. The first episode of the series met with widespread positive reviews from critics and audience, where the performance of actors including Susan Ibrahim Fulhu, Washiya Mohamed and Ahmed Ifnaz Firag were particularly praised with the "suspense and well-crafted" direction from Azhan Ibrahim. Reviewing the finale of the series, Ahmed Rasheed from MuniAvas considered the series to be an "excellent watch, if you are interested in good quality series".
