= Fathimath Sara Adam =

Maldivian film actress (born 2000)

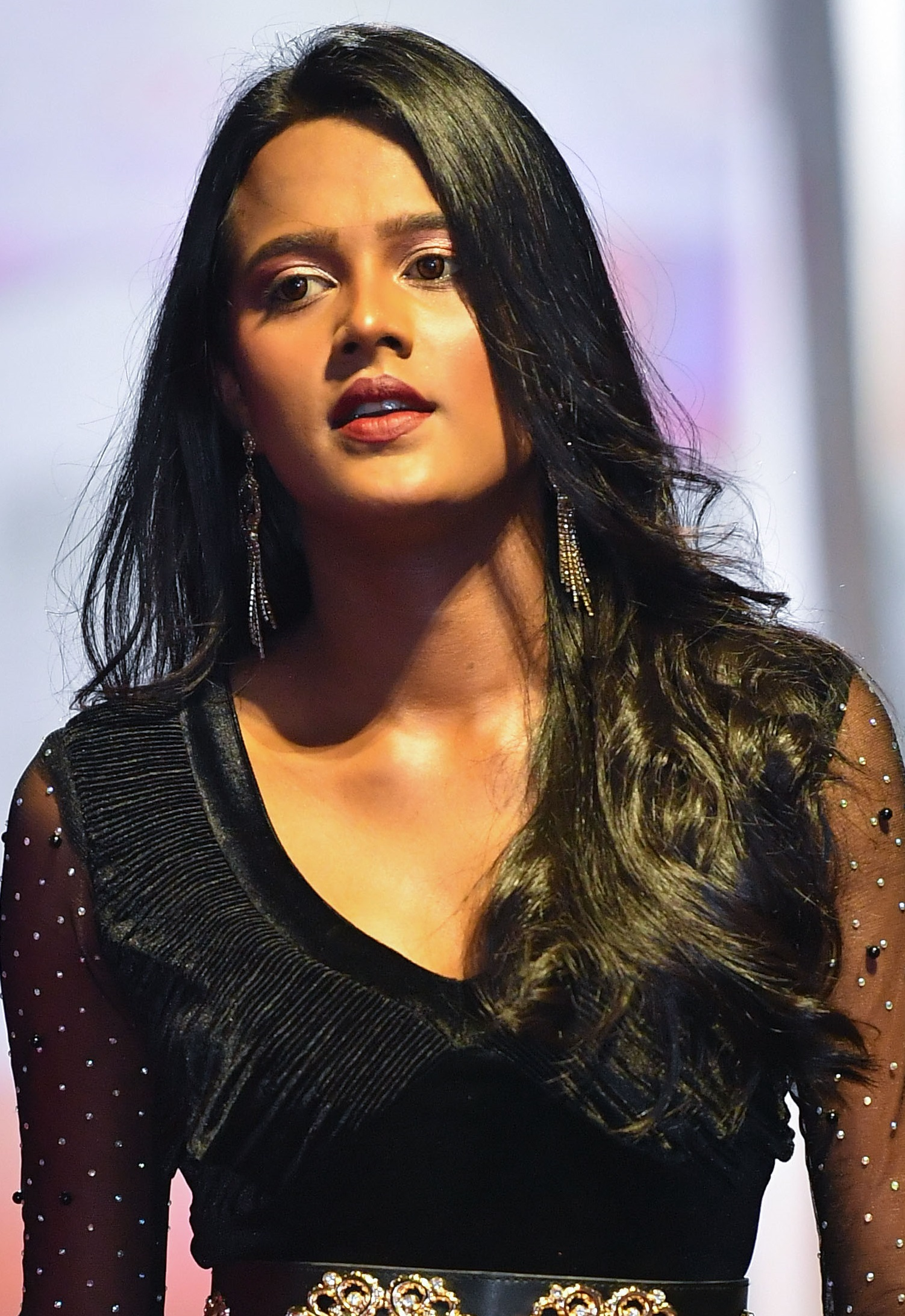
- Born: 22 April 2000 (age 26); Fuvahmulah
- Occupation: Actress
- Years active: 2019–present

Fathimath Sara Adam (born 22 April 2000) is a Maldivian film actress.

== Early life ==
Before pursuing a career in acting, Sara became an active TikTok user, which enabled her to showcase her talent as a performer.

In 2019, Sara made her acting debut in the web series Ehenas, directed by Ravee Farooq. The show received significant critical acclaim and praise for featuring fresh talents including Sara's acting ability for delivering a natural and realistic performance as a dependable friend of a long-term victim of domestic and sexual abuse victim.

She then starred in Ilyas Waheed's horror thriller anthology web series Biruveri Vaahaka as Ziyana, a mysterious woman who claims she can fulfill people's darkest desires. Upon its release, the series garnered widespread critical acclaim across various aspects, including its writing, direction, performances, and visual design, notably for its "skillful incorporation of horror folklore into an engaging visual experience". This was followed by her vengeful performance in Ali Shifau-directed segment "Rankolhaa" from Dark Rain Entertainment's revenge thriller anthology web series Dark Rain Chronicles which received positive reviews from critics.

She then collaborated with Aishath Rishmy for her romantic comedy web series Yaaraa, which explores the polar opposite lives of two sisters faced with the realities of relationships. In the series, she portrayed the character Zak, a spirited and tomboyish girl who thrives on engaging in thought-provoking arguments.

== Filmography ==
=== Feature film ===
Year	Title	Role	Notes	Ref(s)
2023	Free Delivery	Mishy	Special appearance	
2023	Zoya	Zoya		
2024	Balhindhu		Post-production	

=== Television ===
Year	Title	Role	Notes	Ref(s)
2019–2020	Ehenas	Shazu	Main role; 22 episodes	
2021	Nafsu	Nadhaa	Recurring role; 10 episodes	
2021	Noontha?	Herself	Guest role in the segment "Rules & Regulations"	
2022	Biruveri Vaahaka	Ziyana	Main role; Episode: "Edhun"	
2022–2024	Dark Rain Chronicles	Anoosha / Mira	Main role in the segment "Rankolhaa" and "Dhemaa"	
2023–2024	Yaaraa	Zaheena "Zak" Abdul Kareem	Main role; 46 episodes	

=== Short film ===
Year	Title	Role	Notes	Ref(s)
2020	KKB: Kuda Kuda Baaru	Aasha		
2021	Next To You	Her		
