= Fathimath Visama =

Maldivian actress and model

- Born: 16 November 1998 (age 27); F. Nilandhoo
- Occupations: Actress; model
- Years active: 2022–present

Fathimath Visama also known as Vicky (16 November 1998) is a Maldivian film actress and model.

== Career ==
Visama began her acting career with Azhan Ibrahim's crime thriller web series Dharaka, which centers around a high-profile case involving the disappearance of a politician's daughter. The series received widespread critical and audience acclaim, with praise for the performances of the cast, including Visama, as well as the "suspenseful and well-crafted" direction by Azhan Ibrahim. She then collaborated with Ilyas Waheed for his horror thriller anthology web series Biruveri Vaahaka. In the series, she portrayed Reen, an aspiring model who takes a taxi to a photoshoot, leading to her untimely death. Upon release, the series was positively received by critics, who highlighted the cast's performances and Ilyas' creativity in merging horror folklore into an "engaging visual treat".

She later collaborated with Ibrahim Wisan for his web series Gudhan, where she played the role of a masseuse hiding in a go-down with strangers to escape a police raid on the massage parlor where she works. Ahmed Rasheed reviewing from MuniAvas praised the screenplay and concept of the series for its "surprisingly good" deviation from the usual local contents. Her final release of the year was Moomin Fuad's romantic crime web series Netheemey, which explores the story of a spoiled, irresponsible man who moves away from his family with his wife, only to reconnect with his ex-lover living in the apartment opposite theirs.

In 2023, Visama reunited with Azhan Ibrahim for his crime thriller web series Mirai which revolves around a happy family torn apart by the tragic death of their only child and their quest for justice. In the series, she played the role of a friend to a young mother determined to avenge her son's murder. She next appeared alongside Maleeha Waheed and Aminath Shuha in Naaisha Nashid-directed anthology web series Badhalu in the third segment titled "Engaged". This segment follows a bride-to-be discovering her fiancé's true nature through two strangers with whom she shares a cab. She also made her feature film debut in Ilyas Waheed's dark comedy Free Delivery (2023), which tells the story of three restaurant employees who become entangled in a murder case while making a food delivery.

In 2024, Visama starred in two feature films. Her first release was Azhan Ibrahim's romantic film Mee Ishq (2024), which follows two strangers who cross paths after coincidentally booking the same room at a guesthouse. The film received mixed to positive reviews from critics. She then collaborated with Ilyas Waheed on his horror film Kanbalhi (2024), which tells the story of a small family whose lives unravel after moving into a sinister house in search of a fresh start.

== Filmography ==
=== Feature film ===
Year	Title	Role	Notes	Ref(s)
2023	Free Delivery	Fahumeedha		
2024	Mee Ishq	Maisha		
2024	Kanbalhi			
2025	Abadhah	Mahaa		

=== Television ===
Year	Title	Role	Notes	Ref(s)
2022	Dharaka	Iyadha	Recurring role; 8 episodes	
2022	Biruveri Vaahaka	Reen	Main role; Episode "Loabiverin"	
2022	Gudhan	Nazneen	Main role; 12 episodes	
2022	Netheemey	Main	Recurring role; 5 episodes	
2023	Mirai	Zumra	Recurring role; 5 episodes	
2023	Badhalu	Mariyam	Main role; Episode: "Engaged"	
