= Nuzuhath Shuaib =

Maldivian film actress (born 1988)

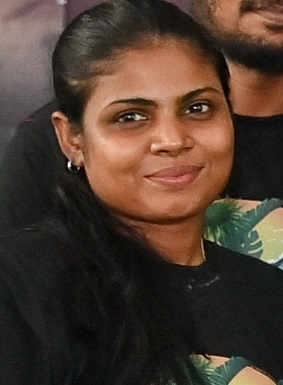
- Shuaib at Maafushi Eid Celebration event, 2022
- Born: 14 September 1988 (age 38); N. Manadhoo
- Occupation: Actress
- Years active: 2017–present
- Spouse: Abdulla Shafeeu (m. 2020)
- Children: 1

Nuzuhath Shuaib (born 14 September 1988) is a Maldivian film actress.

== Early life ==
Nuzuhath Shuaib was born on 14 September 1988 in N. Manadhoo. She was working at Jelly Pizza when her friend, a film actor Ali Azim introduced her to the team of Malikaa. Impressed with the brief meeting, she was roped in to play the title character in the film.

== Career ==
Nuzuhath Shuaib made her film debut with Ali Musthafa-directed family drama Malikaa playing the title role, Malikaa, a sidelined daughter who has been underappreciated for her doings while she manages to execute the whole responsibilities of the family. Featuring Ismail Zahir, Mohamed Jumayyil, Fathimath Azifa, Ahmed Asim, Ali Azim and Neena Saleem in prominent roles, the film met with mixed response from critics. Ahmed Nadheem, reviewing for Avas opined that "Shuaib's strong performance was an unforeseen circumstance in the film since such an acting was not predicted to be seen from her debut". Despite low expectations from trade analysts, the film performed moderately at the box office. She next featured alongside an ensemble cast including Yoosuf Shafeeu, Mohamed Manik, Ahmed Saeed and Ali Seezan in the comedy film Naughty 40 (2017) which was directed by Shafeeu. The film revolves around three friends, Ashwanee, Ahsan and Ajwad (Played by Shafeeu, Saeed and Manik respectively) who are single and having a youthful outlook, in spite of being in their forties. Aishath Maaha from Avas found her to be "good" and predicted her to "have a colorful career with meaty roles". The film met with both critical and commercial success, emerging as one of the highest grossing Maldivian films of the year. This followed with an item number in Abdul Fatthah's romantic drama Hahdhu (2017); a remixed version of the iconic song "Giritee Loabin".

In 2018, Shuaib was featured opposite Mohamed Jumayyil and Mariyam Majudha in Ali Shifau's family drama Vakin Loabin (2018). The film tells a story of a young couple's divorce and its impact on everyone involved. Upon release, the film met with positive response from critics—specifically praising the screenplay for toning down its melodrama and breaking from the stereotypes of its genre—and was a commercial success. In a pre-premier review from Raajje.mv, Ismail Naail Nasheed favored the character development and minimised use of melodrama in the film while praising Nuzuhath Shuaibs's performance throughout the movie: "From acting to delivering the dialogues, she has mastered the art of expression to the like of any experienced actors. Her psychotic micro-expressions steal the limelight of this movie while proving that Shuaib perfectly delivered her character to the fullest".

In 2023, Ilyas Waheed-directed crime thriller Nina was released where Shuaib played the title role as an empowering woman determined to secure justice for herself. In preparation for her role, she underwent rigorous martial arts training for over two months and charged a fee of MVR 1.5 lakh for her role in the project.

== Media image ==
In 2018, Mohamed was ranked in the tenth position from Dho?'s list of Top Ten Actresses of Maldives where writer Aishath Maaha opined that Mohamed is a "promising" actress who has left a big impact with her limited projects.

== Filmography ==
Key
| † | Denotes films that have not yet been released |

=== Feature film ===
| Year | Title | Role | Notes | Ref(s) |
|---|---|---|---|---|
| 2017 | Malikaa | Malikaa | Nominated—Gaumee Film Award for Best Actress | |
| 2017 | Naughty 40 | Zoya | | |
| 2017 | Hahdhu | Herself | Special appearance in song "Giritee Loabin" | |
| 2018 | Vakin Loabin | Roona | Nominated—Gaumee Film Award for Best Supporting Actress | |
| 2019 | Goh Raalhu | Husham's girlfriend | | |
| 2019 | Maamui | Dhiyana | | |
| 2019 | Leena | Faathun | | |
| 2019 | Bavathi | Shehenaz | | |
| 2021 | Faree | Faree | | |
| 2023 | Nina | Aishath Nina Hussain | | |
| 2023 | Free Delivery | Bappi | | |
| 2024 | Kanbalhi | Aalia | | |
| 2025 | Loabin...? | Nuzu | | |
| 2025 | Alvadhaau | Aiza | | |
| 2026 | Lamha | Seema | | |
| 2026 | Magey Bituge Wedding | Herself | Special appearance in song "Kaiveni Medley" | |

=== Television ===
| Year | Title | Role | Notes | Ref(s) |
|---|---|---|---|---|
| 2019 | Yes Sir | Various characters | Recurring role | |
| 2020 | Ehenas | Herself | Guest role; Episode: "Reality Check" | |
| 2021 | Rumi á Jannat | Hawwa Jannat | Main role; 15 episodes | |
| 2021–2022 | Mazloom | Mariyam Zaha Zahir | Main role in "Chapter 1: Mazloom" | |
| 2021 | Loabi Vias | Zeyba | Main role; 8 episodes | |
| 2021 | Noontha? | Sana | Main role in the segment "Rules & Regulations" | |
| 2022 | Shakuvaa | Rindha | Main role; 5 episodes | |
| 2022 | Biruveri Vaahaka | Saba | Main role; 6 episodes | |
| 2023–2024 | Yaaraa | Aminath Rizwana | Main role; 31 episodes | |
| 2024 | Dark Rain Chronicles | Sama Ali | Main role in the segment "Lemon Cake" | |
| 2024–2025 | Roaleemay | Liusha | Main role; 15 episodes | |
| 2025 | Varah Loabivey | Aisha | Main role; 5 episodes | |
| 2025 | Moosun | Inasha | Main role; 6 episodes | |
| 2026 | JunJulaa | Hashma | | |

== Accolades ==
| Year | Award | Category | Nominated work | Result | Ref(s) |
|---|---|---|---|---|---|
| 2019 | 9th Gaumee Film Awards | Best Actress | Malikaa | Nominated | |
| 2019 | 9th Gaumee Film Awards | Best Supporting Actress | Vakin Loabin | Nominated | |
| 2025 | 1st MSPA Film Awards | Best Lead Actor – Female | Nina | Nominated | |
| 2025 | 1st MSPA Film Awards | Best Debut – Female | Vakin Loabin | Nominated | |
| 2025 | 1st MSPA Film Awards | Best Comedian | Vakin Loabin | Nominated | |
