= Ahmed Sharif (Maldivian actor) =

Maldivian actor

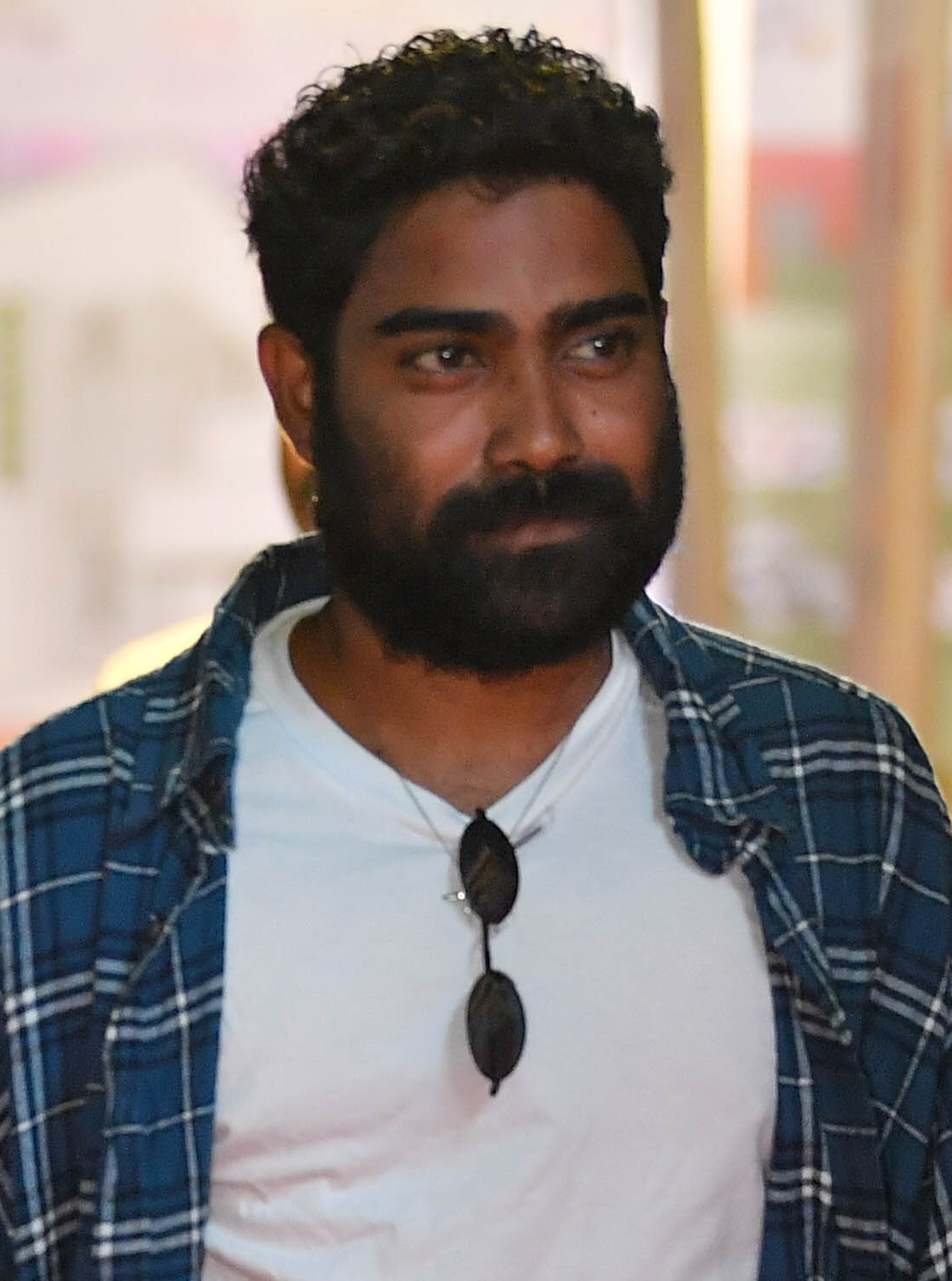
- Sharif attending Olympus reopening ceremony, 2023
- Born: 31 August 1991 (age 35); B. Fehendhoo, Maldives
- Occupation: Actor
- Years active: 2019–present

Ahmed Sharif (born 31 August 1991) is a Maldivian film actor.

== Career ==
Prior to acting, Sharif was more involved in the creative departments of the film where he served as a foley artist and a boom operator in Aishath Rishmy's romantic film Bos (2017). Impressed with the poster of Ehenas and thinking its a horror film, he contacted its casting director Rishmy who invited him to the audition of the series, where he was ultimately selected to play the role of Shinaz, a violent and short-tempered brother. Aishath Maahaa reviewing from Dho? praised the acting performance of the newcomers including Sharif. This was followed by Abdulla Muaz-directed segment Ruqyah from the anthology short film television series Hatharu Manzaru where he played the role of an exorcist. He then he collaborated with Ilyas Waheed for a four-part anthology web series Mazloom which was considered a "benchmark project" in the industry. Ahmed Rasheed from MuniAvas, reviewing its first chapter titled "Mazloom" praised the performance of Sharif for portraying the "innocent and caring" friend in its most realistic manner. He also starred in its second chapter titled "Zarrook" by playing the role of a father of a young child connecting with an imaginary friend.

In 2022, Sharif appeared in four web series, all of which received positive reviews from the critics. The year marks his second collaboration with Ilyas Waheed for his horror thriller anthology web series Biruveri Vaahaka as Rocky, a traumatized survivor of a sea incident. He then appeared in Ibrahim Wisan-directed Gudhan which follows the lives of seven strangers who hide inside a go-down in the neighborhood to flee an unknown police raid at a massage parlor. In the series he played the role of a Bangladeshi worker who forces his subordinate into sex slavery. This was followed by Moomin Fuad's romantic crime web series Netheemey starring alongside Nathasha Jaleel and Washiya Mohamed. In the series, he play the role of an irresponsible, spoilt kid who moves away from his family with his wife only to reunite with his ex-lover living in the opposite apartment.

== Filmography ==
Key
†	Denotes films that have not yet been released

=== Feature film ===
Year	Title	Role	Notes	Ref(s)
2023	Hindhukolheh	Himself	Special appearance	
2023	Free Delivery	Siraj Ibrahim		
2023	Zoya	Hasan		
2024	Mee Ishq	Naaif		
2025	Abadhah	Looth		
2025	Loabin...?	Aqeel		
2025	Lily	Aifan		
2026	Lamha	Ameen		
2026	Dhevi	Himself	Special appearance in song "Funhaa Loabi Dheynuthoa Ey"	
2026	Majunoon	Aayan		

=== Television ===
Year	Title	Role	Notes	Ref(s)
2019–2020	Ehenas	Shinaz	Main role; 22 episodes	
2021	Hatharu Manzaru	Usman	Main role in the segment "Ruqyah"; Karnataka IFF Best Supporting Actor in a Short Film	
2021–2022	Mazloom	Moosa Fathih	Main role in "Chapter 1: Mazloom" and "Chapter 2: Zarrook"	
2021–present	Girlfriends	Firushan	Main role; 12 episodes	
2021–2022	Giritee Loabi	Sharaf	Recurring role; 22 episodes	
2022	Noontha?	Amru	Main role in the segment "Bits & Pieces"	
2022	Biruveri Vaahaka	Razeen "Rocky"	Main role; Episode: "Mas Dhathuru"	
2022	Gudhan	Hossen	Recurring role; 2 episodes	
2022	Netheemey	Hassan Raqib	Main role; 12 episodes	
2022	Dark Rain Chronicles	Riyaz	Main role in the segment "Nostalgia"	
2023	Mirai	Viaam	Guest role; Episode: "Aa Feshun"	
2023	Badhalu	Haisham / Shamin Ali	Guest role; Episode: "Friends"; Main role; Episode: "The Usual"	
2023	Gareena	Ziyad	Recurring role	
2024	Dark Rain Chronicles	Zaleef	Main role in the segment "Dhuruvaan Jehunas"	
2024	Yaaraa	Faruhadh	Recurring role; 7 episodes	
2026	Ekaniveri Hithakun...	Raakin	Main role	
2026	Ganaa	Azaan		

=== Short film ===
Year	Title	Role	Notes
2024	Eid Mubarak	Himself	

== Discography ==
Year	Film/series	Song	Lyricist(s)	Co-artist(s)
2023	Free Delivery	"Free Delivery" (Promotional song)	Ilyas Waheed, Asim Ali	Hussain Samah, Aishath Humaisha Yoosuf, Ahmed Ifnaz Firag
2023	Free Delivery	"Dhuvey Dhuvey"		Ahmed Ifnaz Firag

== Accolades ==
Year	Award	Category	Nominated work	Result	Ref(s)
2023	3rd Karnataka International Film Festival	Best Supporting Actor – Short Film	Ruqyah	Won	
