= Ahmed Ifnaz Firag =

Maldivian actor (born 1985)

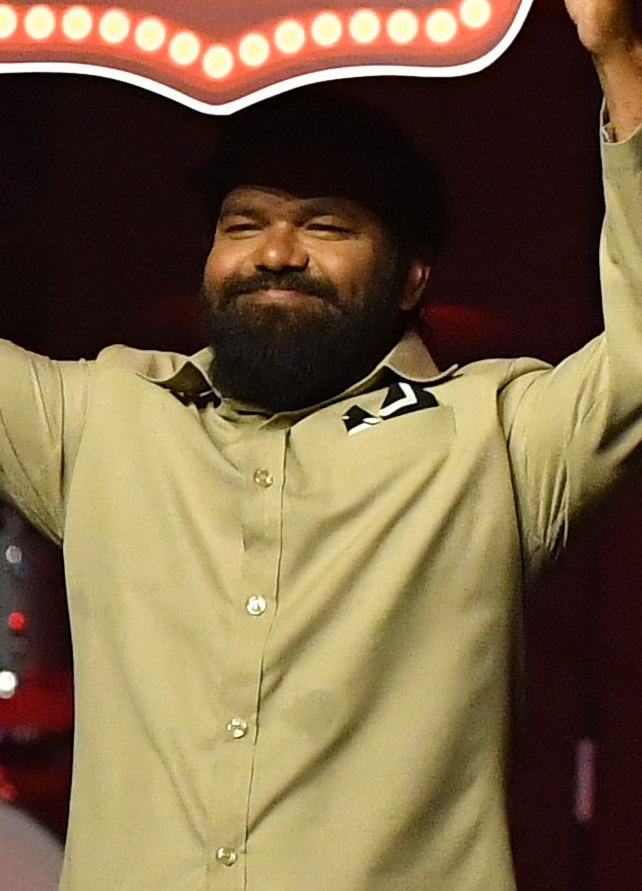
- Born: 12 January 1985 (age 41); Male', Maldives
- Occupations: Actor, Host, Singer, Photographer, Director
- Years active: 2019–present
- Spouse: Thaathi Adam (m. 2013)

Ahmed Ifnaz Firag (born 12 January 1985) is a Maldivian film actor, director, singer, producer, television host, fitness instructor and photographer.

== Early life ==
After completing his primary education in Jamaluddin school, Firag enrolled in Majeediyya School for his secondary education. During that time, he considered himself as an "introvert" who was too shy to showcase his acting skills, which made him firmly believe that acting would remain his "unfulfilled dream". After graduation, he worked in several small time jobs until he was a forensic photographer at Maldives Police Service. While serving his time at the police department, he had a keen interest in their annual "entertainment night" show, where he performed dance shows in front of big crowd.

Since Firag had no intention to work at police for a lifetime service, he left the industry after five years of service. In 2010, he started working at a photography studio owned by one of his friends, which gave him the opportunity to feature in an advertisement, by his friend, Ahmed Rilwan, a blogger and reporter. However, due to several personal reasons, they were forced to shut down the studio. A year later, Rilwan further paved Firag's way into the industry by providing him a chance to host a talk show Chill Out with Coke from DhiTV, which was perceived by the audience as a "cool time pass" from the hardcore political contents. After working at DhiTV, he next joined another local TV channel VTV.

== Career ==
While working at VTV, he was featured in director Ilyas Waheed's mini video drama series, Kushuge Hafaraaiy by playing a negative role. Impressed by his performance, Waheed offered him to play the lead role in his debut feature film Bavathi (2019). Apart from playing the role of a fitness instructor, he worked as the project's assistant director. Upon release, the film received positive reviews from critics where Ifraz Ali from Dho? applauded Firaq for playing his role to perfection and challenging all recent newcomers. Aminath Luba reviewing from Sun echoed similar sentiments, picking Firag as the "surprising element" from the crew where "he left no room to challenge his acting ability". Following the success, he next collaborated with Waheed for a four-part anthology web series Mazloom which was considered another "recent benchmark project" in the industry. Ahmed Rasheed from MuniAvas praised the performance of Firag who was seen in a "shady role later trying to prove his innocence".

== Filmography ==
=== Feature film ===
Year	Title	Role	Notes	Ref(s)
2019	Bavathi	Ibu	Also the assistant director	
2023	Nina	News presenter	Special appearance Also the assistant director	
2023	Free Delivery	Firaqbe	Also the assistant director and singer	
2024	Kanbalhi	Akram	Also the co-director, co-producer and co-editor	
2024	Lasviyas	Javee		
2025	Loabin...?	Ziyad		

=== Television ===
Year	Title	Role	Notes	Ref(s)
2018	Kushuge Hafaraaiy	Dhanish	Main role	
2021	Mazloom	Ahmed Maahir	Main role in "Chapter 1: Mazloom"	
2022	Dharaka	Nawal	Main role; 8 episodes	
2023	Fandu	Hussain	Main role; 13 episodes	
2023–2024	Yaaraa	Ifnaz	Guest role; "Episode 2 & 50"	
2025	Hinthaa	Manik	Recurring role; 4 episodes	
2025	Varah Loabivey	Ibrahim Nisham Mahil	Main role; 5 episodes	
2025	Chaalaakee			

== Discography ==
Year	Film/series	Song	Lyricist(s)	Co-artist(s)
2022	Dharaka	"Dharaka"	Azhan Ibrahim, Asim Ali	Manaal Sadhath
2023	Nina	"Azza"	Mohamed Abdul Ghanee	Mariyam Ashfa
2023	Free Delivery	"Free Delivery" (Promotional song)	Ilyas Waheed, Asim Ali	Hussain Samah, Aishath Humaisha Yoosuf, Ahmed Sharif
2023	Free Delivery	"You I Ah"		Shaheedha Mohamed
2023	Free Delivery	"Dhuvey Dhuvey"		Ahmed Sharif
