= Fathimath Latheefa =

Maldivian film actress

- Occupation: Actress
- Years active: 2019–present

Fathimath Latheefa is a Maldivian film actress.

== Career ==
Prior to acting, Latheefa appeared in advertisements and small roles in few television drama series distributed by VTV.

In 2019, she made her film debut in Ilyas Waheed's psychological thriller film Bavathi (2019), where she played the role of Zulfa, the mother hated by her daughter being accused of disrespecting her disabled husband by having an affair with another man. The film narrates the story of a woman who relocates to Male' after marriage and the strange incidents that follow afterwards. The film received positive reviews from critics, where Ifraz Ali from Dho? credited the film with a four star rating and applauded the screenplay for its "tight suspense" while Aminath Luba reviewing from Sun opined that Bavathi will go down the history lane as an "unexpected masterpiece". Her performance received mixed to positive reviews from critics, where Ifraz Ali opined that Latheefa struggled in "delivering the right emotions and in dialogue delivery" while others were pleased with her debut performance. She next starred as a gossip girl in Mohamed Manik's web series Haasaa, which follows a modern young girl and her infamous relationship with an older man.

The following year, she appeared in Amjad Ibrahim's web series Hanaa where she played the stoical mother of a middle-class family. Upon release, the film received mixed to negative reviews from critics, where Ahmed Jaishan from Sun called the film an "outdated melodrama, re-created from the 90s".

In 2022, she had multiple releases. She was featured as the mother of an envious daughter who forces her friend into human trafficking in the last chapter of Ilyas Waheed's four-part anthology web series Mazloom. Mariyam Waheedha from Dhen praised the performance of Latheefa, while calling the chapter an "honorable conclusion" to a benchmark project. This was followed by her role as an advocative and supportive aunt of an unfortunate daughter in Ahmed Nimal's web series Lafuzu, an encouraging family friend in Ali Seezan's Dhoadhi and a victim of a cursed mask in Ilyas Waheed's horror thriller anthology web series Biruveri Vaahaka.

== Filmography ==
=== Feature film ===
| Year | Title | Role | Notes | Ref(s) |
|---|---|---|---|---|
| 2019 | Bavathi | Zulfa | | |
| 2023 | Hindhukolheh | Imran's mother | | |
| 2023 | Free Delivery | Jameela "Jay" | | |
| 2023 | November | Sameena | | |
| 2024 | Kanbalhi | Mareena | | |
| 2024 | Lasviyas | Haseena | | |
| 2025 | Alvadhaau | Nafeesa | | |

=== Television ===
| Year | Title | Role | Notes | Ref(s) |
|---|---|---|---|---|
| 2019–2020 | Haasaa | Maree | Recurring role; 13 episodes | |
| 2020 | Hanaa | Fareedha | Main role; 10 episodes | |
| 2022 | Mazloom | Zara's mother | Main role in "Chapter 4: Hintha" | |
| 2022–2023 | Lafuzu | Zareena | Main role; 32 episodes | |
| 2022 | Dhoadhi | Mariyam | Recurring role; 6 episodes | |
| 2022 | Biruveri Vaahaka | Ayya's mother | Main role; Episode: "Mask" | |
| 2022 | Yasna | Waheedha | Main role; 15 episodes | |
| 2022 | Netheemey | Nafeesa | Recurring role; 2 episodes | |
| 2022 | Dark Rain Chronicles | Hafeeza Ali | Main role in the segment "Assalaam Alaikum" | |
| 2025 | Feshumaai Nimun | Aiman's mother | Guest role; Episode: "Slipping Away" | |
| 2025 | Moosun | Sofia | Main role; 10 episodes | |
