= Bavathi =

- Official film poster
- Directed by: Ilyas Waheed
- Written by: Ilyas Waheed
- Screenplay by: Ilyas Waheed
- Produced by: Asim Ali; Ahmed Wahyd; Ilyas Waheed
- Starring: Nuzuhath Shuaib; Ahmed Ifnaz Firag
- Cinematography: Ibrahim Wisan
- Edited by: Ahmed Ameed
- Music by: Ismail Adheel
- Production company: IFilms
- Release date: September 2, 2019
- Running time: 121 minutes
- Country: Maldives
- Language: Dhivehi

Bavathi is a 2019 Maldivian psychological thriller film directed by Ilyas Waheed. Produced by Asim Ali, Ilyas Waheed and Ahmed Waheed under IFilms, the film stars Nuzuhath Shuaib and Ahmed Ifnaz Firag in pivotal roles.

== Plot ==
Ibrahim aka Ibu (Ahmed Ifnaz Firag), a fitness trainer visits an island for a training workshop where he meets an introvert, Shehenaz aka Shehe (Nuzuhath Shuaib) who is regarded as a prideful and slightly insane woman on the island. Shehenaz accuses her mother, Zulfa (Fathimath Latheefa) is having an affair with Shakir (Mohamed Rasheed), disrespecting her handicapped husband, Manik (Ibrahim Fairooz Adam). The trip ends with Ibu marrying Shehenaz and bringing her to Male'.

After marriage Shehenaz started to experience hallucinations. Ibu called an exorcist to find the cause. They followed instructions for seven days but nothing changed. On his friends suggestion Ibu installed a camera. While checking the recording Ibu saw Shehenaz scratching her shoulder in sleep. Assuming that Shehenaz has a mental problem, Ibu convinced her to consult with a psychiatrist. She started treatment and Shehenaz responded well to the treatment. However, they still could not figure out what was wrong with her. The doctor assumed that it was due to a suppressed memory of a traumatic event that has been triggered by an unknown cause. To find the suppressed memory, Shehenaz underwent hypnosis. Through hypnosis Shehenaz went back to her childhood where Zulfa pushed and injured Manik for taking Shehenaz to the beach without informing her.

Shehenaz requested to visit her home island. She confronted Zulfa and her "lover" Shakir for what they did to Manik. Shakira broke his silence and revealed that Manik had raped her that and it wasn't Zulfa who caused Manik's paralysis, it was the water on the floor that made Manik to slip and suffer a head injury that caused the paralysis. Shakir and his wife took the expense of Shehenaz's treatment and send Zulfa and Shehenaz aboard for it. They didn't file a complaint to avoid defamation of Shehenaz in island.

After knowing the truth Shehenaz breakdown and Ibu realise that him trying to get intimate with Shehenaz trigger the memory. Shehenaz is cured after knowing the truth and lives a happy life in male' with Ibu.

== Cast ==
- Nuzuhath Shuaib as Shehenaz aka Shehe
- Ahmed Ifnaz Firag as Ibrahim aka Ibu
- Fathimath Latheefa as Zulfa; Shehenaz's mother
- Mohamed Rasheed as Shakir
- Ibrahim Fairooz Adam as Manik; Shehenaz's father
- Ashad Khan as Mohamed
- Ali Yooshau as a friend
- Ali Inaz as a friend
- Hussain Shinan as a friend
- Aishath Nazeeha as a friend
- Ahmed Hameed Adam as Dr. Shimaz
- Mohamed Afrah as Zahir

== Development ==
The project was announced on 1 April 2019 as the debut film from the newly established production company, IFilms. Filming took place in Male' and K. Kaashidhoo. It was reported that Nuzuhath Shuaib will play the lead role in the film, along with the debutant Ahmed Ifnaz Firag, a former television presenter. The film narrates the story of a woman who relocates to Male' after marriage and the strange incidents that follow afterwards. The cast was finalised prior to screen writing. "The story is developed while keeping Shuaib and Firaq on mind. Shuaib was hired due to her strong performances in her previous ventures. Ifnaz was cast considering his desire to pursue acting and we as a debut company mutually decided to launch a fresh face with the film". Workshop classes were conducted for the cast to develop their acting skills and assist on understanding their characters development. Post-production began in August 2019.

== Soundtrack ==
Track listing
No.	Title	Lyrics	Music	Singer(s)	Length
1.	"Bavathi" (Promotional song)	Ilyas Waheed	Ismail Adheel	Jaisha Waheed
2.	"Heela"	Ahmed Nazeeh	Ismail Adheel	Ahmed Nazeeh
3.	"Mee Bala Loabikan"	Ilyas Waheed	Ismail Adheel	Yaamin Rasheed

== Release ==
The motion poster of the film was released on 30 March 2019 which features a drowning woman. This was followed by the first teaser trailer on 26 April 2019 and a second teaser on 3 May 2019. The first official trailer of the film was released on 13 July 2019. The film was released on 2 September 2019.

== Response ==
The film received mainly positive reviews from critics. Ifraz Ali from Dho? credited the film with a four star rating and applauded the screenplay for its "tight suspense" and "incorporated humor". "Shuaib has outdone herself with this commendable performance. Surprisingly, Firaq played his role to perfection challenging all recent newcomers while special mention needs to be conveyed to Visan for his brilliant cinematography and the use of visual effects". Aminath Luba reviewing from Sun opined that Bavathi will go down the history lane as an "unexpected masterpiece" creation. Complimenting the performances, she wrote: "A definite win by Waheed. Shuaib has once again proved what a gifted performer she is; definitely her best till date. Firaq with his earnest determination put his feet on the same level to her and delivers an incredible performance considering his debut". Luba also praised the cinematography and visual effects of the film; "from drone to underwater shots, this has served as a visual treat".

Similar sentiments were echoed by Ahmed Hameed Adam from Avas labeling Shuaib as a "natural performer who surprises the viewer with her authentic acting skills during the climax". Calling the screenplay "the main lead of the film" with its twists and turns, Adam appraised the performance from the rest of cast, cinematography, visual effects and make-up. Adam concluded his review crediting the film as "one of the best Maldivian releases in the recent years".

== Accolades ==
Award	Category	Recipient(s) and nominee(s)	Result	Ref(s)
1st MSPA Film Awards	Best Story	Ilyas Waheed	Won	
1st MSPA Film Awards	Best Choreography	Sharaful Ameen	Won	
1st MSPA Film Awards	Best Makeup – Special Effects	Ruthuba Ahmed	Nominated	
1st MSPA Film Awards	Best Costume Designer	Asma Waheed	Nominated	
1st MSPA Film Awards	Best Visual Effects	Mohamed Samy	Won	
