= Ilyas Waheed =

Maldivian director, producer and screenwriter

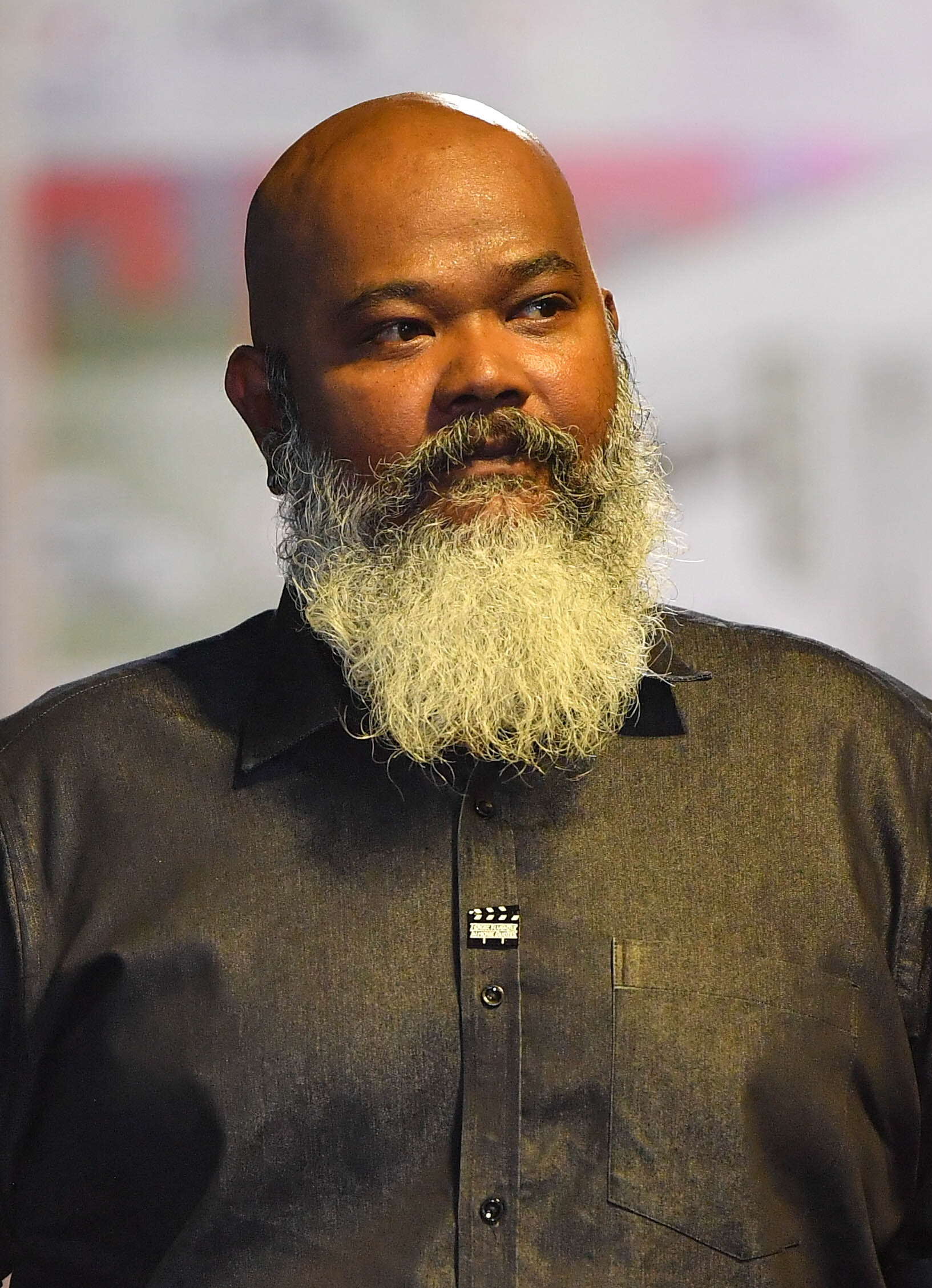
- Waheed attending Olympus reopening ceremony, 2023
- Occupations: Director, producer, screenwriter, editor
- Years active: 2019–present

Ilyas Waheed is a Maldivian film director, producer, screenwriter and editor

== Early life ==
Inspired by his father's patriotism, Waheed inclined to pursue a career as an army officer. However, while studying in grade three, he was bedridden for three months due to a leg fracture, which led him to watch numerous movies, and ultimately changing his passion from military defense to film making and visual arts.

After completing his GCE Ordinary Level education from Majeediyya School, Waheed joined Maldives National Defence Force to complete his bond term. In 2000, he joined Department of Immigration and Emigration, where he served as an Immigration Officer for around 8 years before quitting his job, hoping to attain further education. In 2011, he moved to Sri Lanka to study video and film productions and had to leave the course midway for personal reasons. After returning to Maldives, he joined VTV and served the company for four years prior to leaving Sri Lanka again to complete a course in video production. Afterwards, he resumed his duty at VTV.

While working at VTV, Waheed contributed to several television programs including Kushuge Hafaraaiy, Kudakudhinge Bageecha and season 1 of Bithufangi. After few years, he was fired from the television company pursuant to a reduction in force. Afterwards, he launched his own film studio titled "IFilms" officially stepping into film production.

== Career ==
To initiate Waheed's first project, psychological thriller film titled Bavathi, he faced several rejections from investors due to his lack of experience in film making. Once he acquires fund from two close friends, Asim Ali and his brother Ahmed Wahyd, he commenced the project by finalizing the script along with the film's cast. The film narrates the story of a woman who relocates to Male' after marriage and the strange incidents that follow afterwards. The film received unanimous positive reviews from critics, where Ifnaz Ali from Dho? credited the film with a four star rating and applauded the screenplay for its "tight suspense" "incorporated humor"، while Aminath Luba reviewing from Sun opined that Bavathi will go down the history lane as an "unexpected masterpiece". Similar sentiments were echoed by Ahmed Hameed Adam from Avas who picked Waheed's screenplpay as the "highlight of the film".

In 2021, Waheed released his four-part anthology web series titled Mazloom follows the lives of several victims including survivors of rape assaults, victim of domestics abuse and human trafficking. Produced in association with a newly established film production company, Kazmik International, the project was developed to encourage and support the hard working artists of Maldives during economically uncertain times with regard to COVID-19 pandemic. The series received positive reviews from critics; Ahmed Rasheed from MuniAvas wrote: "If you are up for a quality, interesting and a benhcmark web series, "Mazloom" is the right choice for you". He again collaborated with Kazmik International to co-produce Azhan Ibrahim's eight-episode crime thriller Dharaka.

This was followed by his horror thriller anthology web series Biruveri Vaahaka, consisting of fifteen episodes. Each episode of the series focuses on a separate storyline although the characters from the episodes are interrelated to form the main plot, which revolves around a secretive investigation team trying to undercover a series of supernatural suspected murders. Upon release, the series received positive reviews from critics, where Ahmed Rasheed from MuniAvas wrote: "the whole crew has executed their respective roles to its fullest leading the final project to be flawless". The reviews were directed at the performance of the cast and writer-director Ilyas' creativity for merging horror folklore into an "engaging visual treat".

== Filmography ==
Year	Title	Director	Producer	Writer	Editor	Notes	Ref(s)
2019	Bavathi	Yes	Yes	Yes		Feature film	
2021–2022	Mazloom	Yes	Yes	Yes		Web series; 4 chapters	
2022	Dharaka		Yes			Web series; 8 episodes	
2022	Biruveri Vaahaka	Yes		Yes	Yes	Web series; 15 episodes	
2023	Nina	Yes	Yes	Yes		Feature film	
2023	Free Delivery	Yes	Yes	Yes	Yes	Feature film	
2024	Kanbalhi	Yes		Yes	Yes	Feature film	
2024	Dheydharu Ruin		Yes			Feature film	
2025	Loabin...?	Yes		Yes	Yes	Feature film	
2025	Varah Loabivey	Yes		Yes	Yes	Web series; 5 episodes	

As an actor
Year	Title	Role	Notes	Ref(s)
2023	Yaaraa	Himself	Guest role; "Episode 15"	
2025	Hinthaa	Suheil	Recurring role	

== Accolades ==
Year	Award	Category	Nominated work	Result	Ref(s)
2025	1st MSPA Film Awards	Best Director	Nina	Nominated	
2025	1st MSPA Film Awards	Best Story	Bavathi	Won	
2025	1st MSPA Film Awards	Best Story	Nina	Nominated	
2025	1st MSPA Film Awards	Best Original Screenplay	Free Delivery	Nominated	
2025	1st MSPA Film Awards	Best Editor	Free Delivery (Shared with Mohamed Abdul Ghanee)	Nominated	
