= Lists of Asian films =

This is a list of films produced in Asia by country of origin:

== General ==
- List of Afghan films
- List of Bhutanese films
- List of Cambodian films
- Lists of Indian films
- List of Indonesian films
- List of Iraqi films
- List of Jordanian films
- List of Kazakhstani films
- List of Kyrgyz films
- List of Lebanese films
- List of Mongolian films
- List of Burmese films
- List of Nepalese films
- List of North Korean films
- List of Palestinian films
- List of Saudi Arabian films
- List of Syrian films
- List of Thai films
- List of Turkmenistani films
- List of Uzbekistani films
- List of Vietnamese films

== Armenia ==
- List of Armenian films before 1920
- List of Armenian films of the 1920s
- List of Armenian films of the 1930s
- List of Armenian films of the 1940s
- List of Armenian films of the 1950s
- List of Armenian films of the 1960s
- List of Armenian films of the 1970s
- List of Armenian films of the 1980s
- List of Armenian films of the 1990s
- List of Armenian films of the 2000s
- List of Armenian films of the 2010s
- List of Armenian films of the 2020s

== Azerbaijan ==
- List of Azerbaijani films before 1920
- List of Azerbaijani films of the 1920s
- List of Azerbaijani films of the 1930s
- List of Azerbaijani films of the 1940s
- List of Azerbaijani films of the 1950s
- List of Azerbaijani films of the 1960s
- List of Azerbaijani films of the 1970s
- List of Azerbaijani films of the 1980s
- List of Azerbaijani films of the 1990s
- List of Azerbaijani films of the 2000s
- List of Azerbaijani films of the 2010s
- List of Azerbaijani films of the 2020s

== Bangladesh ==
- List of Dhallywood films before 1960
- 1960
- 1961
- 1962
- 1963
- 1964
- 1965
- 1966
- 1967
- 1968
- 1969
- 1970
- 1971
- 1972
- 1973
- 1974
- 1975
- 1976
- 1977
- 1978
- 1979
- 1980
- 1981
- 1982
- 1983
- 1984
- 1985
- 1986
- 1987
- 1988
- 1989
- 1990
- 1991
- 1992
- 1993
- 1994
- 1995
- 1996
- 1997
- 1998
- 1999
- 2000
- 2001
- 2002
- 2003
- 2004
- 2005
- 2006
- 2007
- 2008
- 2009
- 2010
- 2011
- 2012
- 2013
- 2014
- 2015
- 2016
- 2017
- 2018
- 2019
- 2020
- 2021
- 2022
- 2023
- 2024
- 2025
- 2026

== China ==
- Before 1930
- 1930s
- 1940s
- 1950s
- 1960s
- 1970s
- 1980s
- 1990s
- 2000
- 2001
- 2002
- 2003
- 2004
- 2005
- 2006
- 2007
- 2008
- 2009
- 2010
- 2011
- 2012
- 2013
- 2014
- 2015
- 2016
- 2017
- 2018
- 2019
- 2020
- 2021
- 2022
- 2023
- 2024
- 2025
- 2026
- 2027
- 2028
- 2029

=== Hong Kong ===
- List of Hong Kong films before 1950
- 1950
- 1951
- 1952
- 1953
- 1954
- 1955
- 1956
- 1957
- 1958
- 1959
- 1960
- 1961
- 1962
- 1963
- 1964
- 1965
- 1966
- 1967
- 1968
- 1969
- 1970
- 1971
- 1972
- 1973
- 1974
- 1975
- 1976
- 1977
- 1978
- 1979
- 1980
- 1981
- 1982
- 1983
- 1984
- 1985
- 1986
- 1987
- 1988
- 1989
- 1990
- 1991
- 1992
- 1993
- 1994
- 1995
- 1996
- 1997
- 1998
- 1999
- 2000
- 2001
- 2002
- 2003
- 2004
- 2005
- 2006
- 2007
- 2008
- 2009
- 2010
- 2011
- 2012
- 2013
- 2014
- 2015
- 2016
- 2017
- 2018
- 2019
- 2020
- 2021
- 2022
- 2023
- 2024
- 2025
- 2026
- 2027
- 2028
- 2029

== Georgia ==
- List of Georgian films before 1920
- List of Georgian films of the 1920s
- List of Georgian films of the 1930s
- List of Georgian films of the 1940s
- List of Georgian films of the 1950s
- List of Georgian films of the 1960s
- List of Georgian films of the 1970s
- List of Georgian films of the 1980s
- List of Georgian films of the 1990s
- List of Georgian films of the 2000s
- List of Georgian films of the 2010s
- List of Georgian films of the 2020s

== Iran ==
- List of Iranian films before 1960
- List of Iranian films of the 1960s
- List of Iranian films of the 1970s
- List of Iranian films of the 1980s
- List of Iranian films of the 1990s
- List of Iranian films of the 2000s
- List of Iranian films of the 2010s
- List of Iranian films of the 2020s

== Israel ==
- List of Israeli films before 1960
- 1948
- 1949
- 1950
- 1961
- 1955
- 1956
- 1959
- 1960
- 1961
- 1962
- 1963
- 1964
- 1965
- 1966
- 1967
- 1968
- 1969
- 1970
- 1971
- 1972
- 1973
- 1974
- 1975
- 1976
- 1977
- 1978
- 1979
- 1980
- 1981
- 1982
- 1983
- 1984
- 1985
- 1986
- 1987
- 1988
- 1989
- 1990
- 1991
- 1992
- 1993
- 1994
- 1995
- 1996
- 1997
- 1998
- 1999
- 2000
- 2001
- 2002
- 2003
- 2004
- 2005
- 2006
- 2007
- 2008
- 2009
- 2010
- 2011
- 2012
- 2013
- 2014
- 2015
- 2016
- 2017
- 2018
- 2019
- 2020
- 2021
- 2022
- 2023
- 2024
- 2025
- 2026

== Japan ==
- List of Japanese films before 1910
- List of Japanese films of the 1910s
- List of Japanese films of the 1920s
- List of Japanese films of the 1930s
- List of Japanese films of the 1940s
- 1950
- 1951
- 1952
- 1953
- 1954
- 1955
- 1956
- 1957
- 1958
- 1959
- 1960
- 1961
- 1962
- 1963
- 1964
- 1965
- 1966
- 1967
- 1968
- 1969
- 1970
- 1971
- 1972
- 1973
- 1974
- 1975
- 1976
- 1977
- 1978
- 1979
- 1980
- 1981
- 1982
- 1983
- 1984
- 1985
- 1986
- 1987
- 1988
- 1989
- 1990
- 1991
- 1992
- 1993
- 1994
- 1995
- 1996
- 1997
- 1998
- 1999
- 2000
- 2001
- 2002
- 2003
- 2004
- 2005
- 2006
- 2007
- 2008
- 2009
- 2010
- 2011
- 2012
- 2013
- 2014
- 2015
- 2016
- 2017
- 2018
- 2019
- 2020
- 2021
- 2022
- 2023
- 2024
- 2025
- 2026
- 2027

== Malaysia ==
- List of Malaysian films before 1960
- List of Malaysian films of the 1960s
- List of Malaysian films of the 1970s
- List of Malaysian films of the 1980s
- List of Malaysian films of the 1990s
- List of Malaysian films of the 2000s
- 2000
- 2001
- 2002
- 2003
- 2004
- 2005
- 2006
- 2007
- 2008
- 2009
- List of Malaysian films of the 2010s
- 2010
- 2011
- 2012
- 2013
- 2014
- 2015
- 2016
- 2017
- 2018
- 2019
- List of Malaysian films of the 2020s
- 2020
- 2021
- 2022
- 2023
- 2024
- 2025
- 2026
- 2027
- 2028
- 2029

== Maldives ==
- Before 1992
- 1992
- 1993
- 1994
- 1995
- 1996
- 1997
- 1998
- 1999
- 2000
- 2001
- 2002
- 2003
- 2004
- 2005
- 2006
- 2007
- 2008
- 2009
- 2010
- 2011
- 2012
- 2013
- 2014
- 2015
- 2016
- 2017
- 2018
- 2019
- 2020
- 2021
- 2022
- 2023
- 2024
- 2025

== Pakistan ==
- List of Pakistani Bengali films
- List of Urdu films
- List of Pashto-language films
- List of Pakistani Punjabi-language films
- List of Sindhi-language films
- List of Pakistani films before 1950
- 1950
- 1951
- 1952
- 1953
- 1954
- 1955
- 1956
- 1957
- 1958
- 1959
- 1960
- 1961
- 1962
- 1963
- 1964
- 1965
- 1966
- 1967
- 1968
- 1969
- 1970
- 1971
- 1972
- 1973
- 1974
- 1975
- 1976
- 1977
- 1978
- 1979
- 1980
- 1981
- 1982
- 1983
- 1984
- 1985
- 1986
- 1987
- 1988
- 1989
- 1990
- 1991
- 1992
- 1993
- 1994
- 1995
- 1996
- 1997
- 1998
- 1999
- 2000
- 2001
- 2002
- 2003
- 2004
- 2005
- 2006
- 2007
- 2008
- 2009
- 2010
- 2011
- 2012
- 2013
- 2014
- 2015
- 2016
- 2017
- 2018
- 2019
- 2020
- 2021
- 2022
- 2023
- 2024
- 2025
- 2026

== Philippines ==
- List of Philippine films before 1940
- List of Philippine films of the 1940s
- List of Philippine films of the 1950s
- List of Philippine films of the 1960s
- List of Philippine films of the 1970s
- List of Philippine films of the 1980s
- List of Philippine films of the 1990s
- List of Philippine films of the 2000s
- 2010
- 2011
- 2012
- 2013
- 2014
- 2015
- 2016
- 2017
- 2018
- 2019
- 2020
- 2021
- 2022
- 2023
- 2024
- 2025
- 2026

== Singapore ==
- List of Singaporean films before 1990
- List of Singaporean films of the 1990s
- 2000
- 2001
- 2002
- 2003
- 2004
- 2005
- 2006
- 2007
- 2008
- 2009
- 2010
- 2011
- 2012
- 2013
- 2014
- 2015
- 2016
- 2017
- 2018
- 2019
- 2020
- 2021
- 2022
- 2023
- 2024
- 2025
- 2026

== South Korea ==
- List of South Korean films of 1948–1959
- 1948
- 1949
- 1950
- 1951
- 1952
- 1953
- 1954
- 1955
- 1956
- 1957
- 1958
- 1959
- 1960
- 1961
- 1962
- 1963
- 1964
- 1965
- 1966
- 1967
- 1968
- 1969
- 1970
- 1971
- 1972
- 1973
- 1974
- 1975
- 1976
- 1977
- 1978
- 1979
- 1980
- 1981
- 1982
- 1983
- 1984
- 1985
- 1986
- 1987
- 1988
- 1989
- 1990
- 1991
- 1992
- 1993
- 1994
- 1995
- 1996
- 1997
- 1998
- 1999
- 2000
- 2001
- 2002
- 2003
- 2004
- 2005
- 2006
- 2007
- 2008
- 2009
- 2010
- 2011
- 2012
- 2013
- 2014
- 2015
- 2016
- 2017
- 2018
- 2019
- 2020
- 2021
- 2022
- 2023
- 2024
- 2025
- 2026

== Sri Lanka ==
- List of Sri Lankan films of the 1940s
- List of Sri Lankan films of the 1950s
- List of Sri Lankan films of the 1960s
- List of Sri Lankan films of the 1970s
- List of Sri Lankan films of the 1980s
- List of Sri Lankan films of the 1990s
- List of Sri Lankan films of the 2000s
- List of Sri Lankan films of the 2010s
- List of Sri Lankan films of the 2020s

== Turkey ==
- List of Turkish films before 1960
- List of Turkish films of the 1960s
- List of Turkish films of the 1970s
  - List of Turkish films of 1970
  - List of Turkish films of 1971
  - List of Turkish films of 1972
  - List of Turkish films of 1973
  - List of Turkish films of 1974
  - List of Turkish films of 1975
  - List of Turkish films of 1976
  - List of Turkish films of 1977
  - List of Turkish films of 1978
  - List of Turkish films of 1979
- List of Turkish films of the 1980s
- List of Turkish films of the 1990s
- List of Turkish films of the 2000s
  - List of Turkish films of 2005
  - List of Turkish films of 2007
  - List of Turkish films of 2008
  - List of Turkish films of 2009
- List of Turkish films of the 2010s
  - List of Turkish films of 2010
  - List of Turkish films of 2011
  - List of Turkish films of 2012
  - List of Turkish films of 2013
  - List of Turkish films of 2014
  - List of Turkish films of 2015
  - List of Turkish films of 2016
  - List of Turkish films of 2017
  - List of Turkish films of 2018
- List of Turkish films of the 2020s
  - List of Turkish films of 2023
  - List of Turkish films of 2024

== See also ==
- Cinema of Oman
- Cinema of United Arab Emirates
