= List of Maldivian films =

This is a list of films produced by Maldivian film industry ordered by year and decade of release.

== Before 2000 ==
- List of Maldivian films before 1992
- List of Maldivian films of 1992
- List of Maldivian films of 1993
- List of Maldivian films of 1994
- List of Maldivian films of 1995
- List of Maldivian films of 1996
- List of Maldivian films of 1997
- List of Maldivian films of 1998
- List of Maldivian films of 1999

== 2000s ==
- List of Maldivian films of 2000
- List of Maldivian films of 2001
- List of Maldivian films of 2002
- List of Maldivian films of 2003
- List of Maldivian films of 2004
- List of Maldivian films of 2005
- List of Maldivian films of 2006
- List of Maldivian films of 2007
- List of Maldivian films of 2008
- List of Maldivian films of 2009

== 2010s ==
- List of Maldivian films of 2010
- List of Maldivian films of 2011
- List of Maldivian films of 2012
- List of Maldivian films of 2013
- List of Maldivian films of 2014
- List of Maldivian films of 2015
- List of Maldivian films of 2016
- List of Maldivian films of 2017
- List of Maldivian films of 2018
- List of Maldivian films of 2019

== 2020s ==
- List of Maldivian films of 2020
- List of Maldivian films of 2021
- List of Maldivian films of 2022
- List of Maldivian films of 2023
- List of Maldivian films of 2024
- List of Maldivian films of 2025
