= List of Maldivian films of 2000 =

This is a list of Maldivian films released in 2000.

== Releases ==
=== Feature film ===
Opening		Title	Director	Studio	Cast
APR	10	Ajaaib	Haajara Abdul Kareem	Farivaa Films	Ahmed Asim, Mariyam Nazima, Koyya Hassan Manik, Waleedha Waleed, Haajara Abdul Kareem
AUG	14	Zalzalaa	Ahmed Nimal	Slam Studio	Niuma Mohamed, Ibrahim Wisan, Ahmed Nimal, Ali Shameel
NOV	11	Namoonaa	Aslam Rasheed	Slam Studio	Ali Shameel, Niuma Mohamed, Aishath Shiranee
NA		Kaiveneege Furathama Rey	Mohamed Abdul Hakeem; Mohamed Nasheed	Farivaa Films	Sajna Ahmed, Mohamed Abdul Hakeem, Ahmed Asim, Haajara Abdul Kareem
NA		Maazee	Mohamed Ali Manik	Feeroz Audio	Ismail Wajeeh, Jamsheedha Ahmed, Ali Shimree, Mariyam Nazima, Aminath Rasheedha
NA		2000 Vana Ufan Dhuvas	Easa Shareef	Genius Movies	Reeko Moosa Manik, Jamsheedha Ahmed, Ali Seezan, Mariyam Shakeela
NA		Saahibaa	Arifa Ibrahim	Slam Studio	Yoosuf Shafeeu, Mariyam Nazima, Waleedha Waleed
NA		Hiyy Halaaku	Hussain Adil	Motion Pictures	Yoosuf Shafeeu, Mariyam Sheleen, Niuma Mohamed, Sheela Najeeb, Ibrahim Giyas, Fauziyya Hassan
NA		Rihun	Hussain Shihab	Mapa	Ismail Wajeeh, Aishath Shiranee, Fathimath Neena, Aminath Rasheedha
NA		Ainbehge Loabi Firiehge Vaajib	Amjad Ibrahim	Motion Pictures	Yoosuf Shafeeu, Jamsheedha Ahmed, Arifa Ibrahim, Niuma Mohamed, Mifzal Ahmed
NA		Shaalinee	Aslam Rasheed	Slam Studio	Mariyam Nisha, Ibrahim Giyas, Mohamed Shavin, Waleedha Waleed
NA		Himeyn Dhuniye	Abdul Faththaah	Dhekedheke Ves Productions	Mariyam Nisha, Ali Khalid, Moosa Zakariyya, Sajna Ahmed, Aminath Rasheedha, Mariyam Shakeela, Fauziyya Hassan
NA		Majubooru Loabi	Amjad Ibrahim	Motion Pictures	Mariyam Nisha, Yoosuf Shafeeu, Reeko Moosa Manik, Arifa Ibrahim, Sithi Fulhu, Haajara Abdul Kareem, Mohamed Abdulla
NA		Emme Fahu Dhuvas	Easa Shareef	Seven Private Limited	Reeko Moosa Manik, Hassan Afeef, Niuma Mohamed, Mariyam Nazima

=== Television ===
This is a list of Maldivian series, in which the first episode was aired or streamed in 2000.

Opening		Title	Director	Cast	Notes
MAR	29	Dharifulhu	Mohamed Shareef	Ismail Rasheed, Ali Shameel, Aminath Rasheedha, Zuleykha Abdul Latheef	Teledrama
NA		Kashithanmathi	Mahdi Ahmed	Ismail Wajeeh, Waleedha Waleed, Hamid Ali	Teledrama
NA		Reysham	Abdul Faththaah	Mariyam Nisha, Asad Shareef, Ahmed, Shareef, Aminath Rasheedha, Fauziyya Hassan, Waleedha Waleed	22 Episodes
NA		Dhoapatta	Abdul Faththaah	Jamsheedha Ahmed, Mohamed Shavin, Sheela Najeeb, Niuma Mohamed	10 Episodes

== See also ==
- Lists of Maldivian films
