= List of Maldivian films of 2002 =

This is a list of Maldivian films released in 2002.

== Releases ==
=== Feature film ===
Opening		Title	Director	Studio	Cast
MAR	26	Loabi Nuvevununama	Ahmed Shimau	Mapa	Mariyam Nisha, Yoosuf Shafeeu, Mariyam Nazima, Moosa Zakariyya, Ahmed Shimau
MAY	16	30 Dhuvas		Club Hulhevi	Shafeeqa
JUN	5	Sandhuravirey	Amjad Ibrahim	Dash Studio	Yoosuf Shafeeu, Mariyam Nisha, Khadheeja Mohamed, Neena Saleem
JUL	31	Kahvalhah Dhaandhen	Amjad Ibrahim	Motion Pictures	Yoosuf Shafeeu, Sheela Najeeb, Kausar, Mohamed Shavin, Neena Saleem
OCT	10	Aan... Aharenves Loabivin	Abdul Faththaah	Odiomart Productions	Ali Seezan, Sheela Najeeb, Niuma Mohamed, Aminath Rasheedha, Neena Saleem
NA		Hithu Vindhu	Mohamed Rasheed	Picture Land	Ali Seezan, Mariyam Nazima, Yoosuf Shafeeu, Sajuna Ahmed

=== Television ===
This is a list of Maldivian series, in which the first episode was aired or streamed in 2002.

Opening		Title	Director	Cast	Notes
NOV	10	Fahu Fiyavalhu	Abdul Faththaah	Koyya Hassan Manik, Mohamed Manik, Hassan Afeef, Sheela Najeeb, Fathimath Shazna	5 episodes

== See also ==
- Lists of Maldivian films
