= List of Maldivian films of 1999 =

This is a list of Maldivian films released in 1999.

== Releases ==
=== Feature film ===
Opening		Title	Director	Studio	Cast
NOV	13	Umurah	Ali Musthafa	Dash Studio	Reeko Moosa Manik, Hussain Sobah, Jamsheedha Ahmed, Zeenath Abbas, Aminath Rasheedha, Koyya Hassan Manik
DEC	01	Nuruhunvi Loabi	Ahmed Ibrahim	Farivaa Films	Mohamed Abdul Hakeem, Thooba Ahmed, Abdul Salaam Abdul Hakeem, Maimoona Yoosuf, Hassan Afeef
NA		Leykokaa		Dash Studio	Moosa Zakariyya, Aishath Shiznee
NA		Loabiveriyaa	Arifa Ibrahim	Slam Studio	Jamsheedha Ahmed, Hussain Sobah, Ibrahim Giyas, Ajwad Waheedh
NA		Qurbaani	Amjad Ibrahim	Kathiriya Productions	Mariyam Nisha, Yoosuf Shafeeu, Hussain Sobah
NA		Sababu	Ahmed Nimal	Slam Studio	Ibrahim Giyas, Aishath Shiranee, Ahmed Nimal, Mohamed Afrah
NA		Viraashaa			Ali Shimau, Munawwara, Haajara Abdul Kareem, Ali Shameel, Abdulla Faisal

=== Television ===
This is a list of Maldivian series, in which the first episode was aired or streamed in 1999.

Opening		Title	Director(s)	Cast	Notes
NOV	11	Maafkuraashey	Amila Adam	Niuma Mohamed; Moosa Zakariyya; Mariyam Nazima; Ahmed Saeed; Zeenath Abbas; Fauziyya Hassan; Koyya Hassan Manik; Mariyam Haleem	10 episodes
NA		Hamaekani Dharifulhahtakai...	Mohamed Shiyaz	Ismail Wajeeh; Jumana Ahmed; Aishath Shiznee; Ibrahim Rasheed; Ali Shimree	Teledrama

== See also ==
- Lists of Maldivian films
