= List of Maldivian films of 2004 =

This is a list of Maldivian films released in 2004.

== Releases ==
=== Feature film ===
Opening		Title	Director	Studio	Cast
MAR	10	Hatharu Udhares	Easa Shareef, Mohamed Rasheed, Ibrahim Rasheed	EMA Productions	Ali Ahmed, Ali Seezan, Reeko Moosa Manik, Mariyam Manike
MAR	25	Dharinnahtakai	Ahmed Nimal	Art Waves	Niuma Mohamed, Ali Seezan, Sheereen Abdul Wahid, Ahmed Asim
APR	30	Sandhuravirey 2	Amjad Ibrahim	Dash Studio	Yoosuf Shafeeu, Niuma Mohamed, Zeenath Abbas, Mohamed Shavin, Sheereen Abdul Wahid, Mariyam Nisha
JUL	4	Hama Himeyn	Ahmed Nimal	Corona Arts	Ali Seezan, Khadheeja Ibrahim Didi, Nashidha Mohamed, Ali Shameel
SEP	2	Eynaa	Abdul Faththaah	Slam Studio	Sheela Najeeb, Mohamed Manik, Ahmed Shah, Khadheeja Ibrahim Didi, Ibrahim Jihad, Nashidha Mohamed, Hassan Afeef
SEP	15	Edhathuru	Yoosuf Shafeeu	Mai Dreams Entertainment	Mohamed Shavin, Sheereen Abdul Wahid, Ali Ahmed, Lufshan Shakeeb, Fathmath Neelam, Nadhiya Hassan, Ibrahim Sobah, Yoosuf Solih, Yoosuf Shafeeu

=== Television ===
This is a list of Maldivian series, in which the first episode was aired or streamed in 2004.

Opening		Title	Director	Cast	Notes
APR	29	Vahum	Mohamed Shiyaz	Niuma Mohamed, Lufshan Shakeeb, Sheereen Abdul Wahid, Neena Saleem, Chilhiya Moosa Manik	Teledrama
NA		Loabi Loabi Dharifulhaa		Ahmed Shimau, Jamsheedha Ahmed	Teledrama
NA		Kamana Vareh Neiy	Amjad Ibrahim	Ali Shameel, Fauziyya Hassan, Sheela Najeeb, Mohamed Shavin, Khadheeja Ibrahim Didi, Hamid Ali	5 episodes
NA		Loabi Nulibunas	Waleedha Waleed	Niuma Mohamed, Sheela Najeeb, Ali Seezan, Sheereen Abdul Wahid	13 episodes

=== Short films ===
Opening	Title	Director	Studio	Cast
NA	Dheke Dhekeves 1	Yoosuf Shafeeu	Mai Dreams Entertainment	Mohamed Abdulla, Fathimath Neelam, Nadhiya Hassan, Ahmed Ziya
NA	Falhi Sikunthu 1	Amjad Ibrahim	Mai Dream Entertainment	Mohamed Abdulla, Sheereen Abdul Wahid, Ahmed Shaz, Hussain Nooradeen
NA	Keymaatu	Amjad Ibrahim		Mariyam Nisha, Hussain Shibau

== See also ==
- Lists of Maldivian films
