= List of Maldivian films of 2001 =

This is a list of Maldivian films released in 2001.

== Releases ==
=== Feature film ===
Opening		Title	Director	Studio	Cast
MAY	10	Dhumah Eri Thari	Mohamed Abdul Hakeem	Farivaa Films	Ahmed Asim, Aishath Humeydha, Raifa Yoosuf, Mohamed Abdul Hakeem
JUL	4	Hilihilaa	Ahmed Nimal	Motion Pictures	Asad Shareef, Niuma Mohamed, Mariyam Nazima, Sheela Najeeb, Ahmed Shimau
NA		Aaah	Amjad Ibrahim	Image Village	Yoosuf Shafeeu, Mohamed Shavin, Ibrahim Giyas, Sheela Najeeb, Jamsheedha Ahmed
NA		Dheevaanaa	Aslam Rasheed	Slam Studio	Niuma Mohamed, Mohamed Shavin, Waleedha Waleed, Mohamed Afrah
NA		Hiiy Edhenee	Aishath Ali Manik	EMA Productions	Asad Shareef, Sheela Najeeb, Ali Seezan, Niuma Mohamed
NA		Hithi Nimun	Ali Shameel	Slam Studio	Mohamed Shavin, Mariyam Nisha, Sheereen Abdul Wahid, Mohamed Afrah
NA		Hiyy Heyokuraathi	Ali Musthafa	Dash Studio	Hussain Sobah, Aishath Shiranee
NA		Naaummeedhu	Fathimath Nahula	Mapa	Reeko Moosa Manik, Yoosuf Shafeeu, Mariyam Nisha, Jamsheedha Ahmed
NA		Ranmuiy	Abdulla Sujau; Abdul Faththaah		Ismail Wajeeh, Aishath Ibrahim, Amira Amir, Adnan Abdul Raheem, Ahmed Naseer, Aminath Rasheedha

=== Short film ===
Opening		Title	Director	Studio	Cast
MAY	01	Paree Dhahtha	Amjad Ibrahim	Motion Pictures	Sheela Najeeb, Malakaa, Rayyan, Neena Saleem, Asad Shareef
NA		Juhaage Buhdhi 1	Mohamed Abdul Hakeem	Farivaa Films	Mohamed Abdul Hakeem, Zeenath Abdul Rahuman, Ahmed Asim, Abdulla Naseer
NA		Santhi Mariyan'bu 1	Amjad Ibrahim	Motion Pictures	Suneetha Ali, Mohamed Shavin
NA		Safaru Kaiydha 1	Amjad Ibrahim	Motion Pictures	Suneetha Ali, Hussain Shibau, Mohamed Shavin

=== Television ===
This is a list of Maldivian series, in which the first episode was aired or streamed in 2001.

Opening	Title	Director	Cast	Notes
NA	Konme Fiyavalhehves	Mohamed Shareef	Ahmed Saeed, Mariyam Nazima, Moosa Zakariyya, Fathimath Shazna, Khadheeja Mohamed	

== See also ==
- Lists of Maldivian films
