= List of Maldivian films of 2003 =

This is a list of Maldivian films released in 2003.

== Releases ==
=== Feature film ===
Opening		Title	Director	Studio	Cast
JAN	26	Ginihila	Easa Shareef	EMA Productions	Ali Seezan, Mariyam Nisha, Reeko Moosa Manik, Niuma Mohamed
MAR	25	Kalaayaanulaa	Fathimath Nahula	Mapa	Yoosuf Shafeeu, Niuma Mohamed, Aishath Shiranee
MAY	1	Araamagu Dhonkamana	Imad Ismail	Slam Studio	Asad Shareef, Fathimath Shazna, Mohamed Afrah, Mariyam Nazima
JUN	2	Dhonkamana	Amjad Ibrahim	EMA Productions	Yoosuf Shafeeu, Fauziyya Hassan, Sheela Najeeb, Niuma Mohamed, Sheereen Abdul Wahid, Aminath Rasheedha, Amira Ismail
NA		Edhi Edhi Hoadheemey	Hussain Shafeeu	KMR Productions	Yoosuf Shafeeu, Mariyam Nisha, Ismail Rasheed
NA		Vehey Vaarey Therein	Abdul Faththaah	Motion Pictures	Yoosuf Shafeeu, Jamsheedha Ahmed, Khadheeja Ibrahim Didi, Mohamed Shavin, Amira Ismail, Aminath Rasheedha

=== Short films ===
Opening		Title	Director	Studio	Cast
MAR	15	Juhaage Buhdhi 3	Mohamed Abdul Hakeem	Farivaa Films	Mohamed Abdul Hakeem, Zeenath Abdul Rahuman, Ahmed Asim, Abdulla Naseer

=== Television ===
This is a list of Maldivian series, in which the first episode was aired or streamed in 2003.

Opening		Title	Director	Cast	Notes
OCT	07	Ujaalaa Raasthaa	Mohamed Shareef	Ahmed Saeed; Zeenath Abbas; Hassan Afeef; Fathimath Nazeeha; Ali Shameel; Aminath Rasheedha; Chilhiya Moosa Manik; Ahmed Asim	13 Episodes
NOV	04	Edhuvas En'buri Annaanenama	Fathimath Nahula	Yoosuf Shafeeu; Jamsheedha Ahmed; Mohamed Manik; Aminath Rasheedha; Koyya Hassan Manik	5 Episodes
NA		Dheewanaa Hiyy	Easa Shareef	Yoosuf Shafeeu; Lufshan Shakeeb; Sheereen Abdul Wahid; Koyya Hassan Manik; Fauziyya Hassan; Aminath Rasheedha; Hussain Shibau	5 Episodes
NA		Raiy Finifenmaa		Sheela Najeeb; Mohamed Shavin; Fathimath Shazna	
NA		Thiyey Mihithuge Vindhakee	Abdul Faththaah	Mohamed Manik; Sheela Najeeb; Zeenath Abbas; Hassan Afeef; Ahmed Saeed; Mariyam Shakeela; Aminath Rasheedha; Aminath Suneetha; Niuma Mohamed	52 Episodes
NA		Vaisoori	Arifa Ibrahim	Ali Shameel; Aminath Rasheedha; Niuma Mohamed; Ahmed Asim; Nooma Ibrahim; Aminath Rishfa; Sheereen Abdul Wahid; Khadheeja Ibrahim Didi	52 Episodes

== See also ==
- Lists of Maldivian films
