= List of Maldivian films of 1996 =

This is a list of Maldivian films released in 1996.

== Releases ==
=== Feature film ===
| Opening | | Title | Director | Studio | Cast |
|---|---|---|---|---|---|
| MAY | 13 | Lheedharifulhu | Ahmed Sharmeel | Farivaa Films | Ahmed Sharmeel, Mariyam Haajara, Abdul Rahman Rauf, Zaneena, Haajara Abdul Kareem |
| OCT | 09 | Badhal | Hamid Ali | Farivaa Films | Hamid Ali, Hussain Sobah, Niuma Mohamed, Waleedha Waleed |
| OCT | 25 | Huras | Amjad Ibrahim | Farivaa Films | Hassan Afeef, Mariyam Rasheedha, Vazuna Ahmed, Koyya Hassan Manik, Arifa Ibrahim |
| NA | | Diary | Mohamed Aboobakuru | Slam Studio | Hassan Afeef, Waleedha Waleed, Mohamed Aboobakuru, Arifa Ibrahim |
| NA | | Edhuvas Hingajje | Easa Shareef | Slam Studio | Reeko Moosa Manik, Wadheefa Adam, Mohamed Aboobakuru, Nooma Ibrahim, Azma |
| NA | | Fun Asaru | Amila Adam; Aishath Leela; Emaz Abdul Shukoor | Television Maldives | Aishath Shiranee, Hussain Sobah, Ibrahim Rasheed, Hawwa Riyaza, Ali Shameel, Arifa Ibrahim, Chilhiya Moosa Manik, Roanu Hassan Manik |
| NA | | Hagu An'bi | Mohamed Aboobakuru | Faransa Films | Niuma Mohamed, Mohamed Aboobakuru, Nafeesa Ali, Chilhiya Moosa Manik, Arifa Ibrahim |
| NA | | Haqqu | Yoosuf Rafeeu | Bukhari Films | Reeko Moosa Manik, Mariyam Nisha, Mariyam Shakeela, Arifa Ibrahim, Roanu Hassan Manik, Easa Shareef |
| NA | | Hifehettumeh Neiy Karuna | Mohamed Rasheed | Slam Studio | Niuma Mohamed, Ibrahim Wisan, Abdul Raheem, Arifa Ibrahim |
| NA | | Niboo | Yoosuf Rafeeu | Television Maldives | Yoosuf Rafeeu, Reeko Moosa Manik, Niuma Mohamed, Waleedha Waleed |

=== Television ===
This is a list of Maldivian series, in which the first episode was aired or streamed in 1996.

| Opening | Title | Director(s) | Cast | Notes |
|---|---|---|---|---|
| NA | Badhunaamu | Fathimath Nahula | Aishath Shiranee, Hussain Sobah, Ali Shameel, Mariyam Rasheedha | Teledrama |
| NA | Malakaa | Hussain Adhil | Aishath Shiranee, Abdul Rahuman Rauf, Nooma Ibrahim | Teledrama |
| NA | Riheyfai Mahchah Foi | | Ali Shameel, Ahmed Giyas, Mariyam Rasheedha, Arifa Ibrahim, Fathimath Mufliha, Shakir | Teledrama |

== See also ==
- Lists of Maldivian films
