= List of Maldivian films of 1998 =

This is a list of Maldivian films released in 1998.

== Releases ==
=== Feature film ===
Opening		Title	Director	Studio	Cast
MAR	06	Huvafen	Aslam Rasheed	Slam Studio	Niuma Mohamed, Ismail Wajeeh
NOV	04	Amaanaaiy	Mahdi Ahmed	Eternal Pictures	Ali Khalid, Fathimath Rameeza, Jamsheedha Ahmed, Iujaz Hafiz
NOV	11	Mila Handhuvaru	Hamid Ali	Farivaa Films	Mariyam Nisha, Mohamed Hassan, Amjad Ibrahim, Sithi Fulhu
NA		Olhunuvi Hiyy	Yoosuf Rafeeu	Bukhari Studio	Ahmed Azim, Mariyam Nisha, Shazuna, Hamid
NA		Sirru	Hussain Adhil	Image Village	Reeko Moosa Manik, Aishath Shiznee, Mariyam Rizla, Arifa Ibrahim, Chilhiya Moosa Manik, Ibrahim Rasheed, Jamsheedha Ahmed
NA		Ethoofaaneerey	Ali Musthafa	Dash Studio	Hussain Sobah, Aishath Shiranee, Aishath Jaleel, Mariyam Sheleen
NA		Dhauvaa	Arifa Ibrahim	Slam Studio	Reeko Moosa Manik, Niuma Mohamed, Waleedha Waleed
NA		Fahuneyvaa	Fathimath Nahula	Dash Studio	Hussain Sobah, Jamsheedha Ahmed, Mariyam Nisha
NA		Kuhveriya	Mohamed Rasheed	Villager Maldives	Moosa Zakariyya, Ismail Hilmy, Aishath Jaleel, Zeenath Abbas

=== Television ===
This is a list of Maldivian series, in which the first episode was aired or streamed in 1998.

Opening		Title	Director(s)	Cast	Notes
DEC	24	Aisha	Abdul Faththaah	Jamsheedha Ahmed, Ibrahim Hilmy, Arifa Ibrahim, Niuma Mohamed, Asad Shareef, Waleedha Waleed, Ali Shameel	10 Episodes
NA		Ehan'dhaan	Fathimath Nahula	Aishath Shiranee, Hussain Sobah, Ismail Wajeeh	
NA		Kulheybeybe	Fathimath Nahula	Jamsheedha Ahmed, Moosa Zakariyya, Ahmed Shimau	5 Episodes
NA		Raalhubaani	Abdul Faththaah	Aishath Shiranee, Ismail Wajeeh, Ali Shimry	Teledrama
NA		Un'hoo Thakuraa		Jamsheedha Ahmed, Ali Shameel, Hamid Ali	Teledrama

== See also ==
- Lists of Maldivian films
