= List of Maldivian films of 2005 =

This is a list of Maldivian films released in 2005.

== Releases ==
=== Feature film ===
Opening		Title	Director	Studio	Cast
APR	13	Handhu Keytha	Ahmed Nimal	Motion Pictures	Ali Seezan, Niuma Mohamed, Sheereen Abdul Wahid, Amira Ismail, Ahmed Asim, Neena Saleem
JUL	19	Zuleykha	Fathimath Nahula	Mapa	Yoosuf Shafeeu, Mariyam Nisha, Sheela Najeeb, Mohamed Manik, Ali Seezan, Mariyam Enash Sinan
SEP	6	Hureemey Inthizaarugaa	Abdul Faththaah	Apollo Entertainments	Ravee Farooq, Mariyam Zuhura, Waleedha Waleed, Neena Saleem, Ibrahim Jihad

=== Television ===
This is a list of Maldivian series, in which the first episode was aired or streamed in 2005.

Opening		Title	Director	Cast	Notes
FEB	10	Loabi Vaanama	Mohamed Shareef	Sheela Najeeb, Mohamed Manik, Fathimath Noora, Ahmed Saeed	18 episodes
NA		Baiveriyaa	Mohamed Shareef	Yoosuf Shafeeu, Niuma Mohamed, Ali Seezan, Aminath Rishfa, Khadheeja Ibrahim Didi	14 episodes
NA		Fukkashi	Hussain Rasheed	Hussain Shibau, Mohamed Anil, Aminath Shareef, Fathimath Niuma, Chilhiya Moosa Manik, Ahmed Saeed	25 Episodes
NA		Kalaage Haqqugaa	Fathimath Nahula	Niuma Mohamed, Ali Ahmed, Ali Seezan, Jamsheedha Ahmed, Sheela Najeeb, Nashidha Mohamed, Aminath Rasheedha, Ali Shameel	13 Episodes
NA		Vairoalhi Ahves Sirrun	Arifa Ibrahim	Niuma Mohamed, Lufshan Shakeeb, Ahmed Asim, Ali Shameel, Aminath Rasheedha, Mariyam Shakeela	52 Episodes

=== Short film ===
Opening		Title	Director	Studio	Cast
N/A		Dheke Dhekeves 2	Ravee Farooq	Mai Dream Entertainment	Mohamed Abdulla, Nadhiya Hassan, Aminath Rana, Adam Mohamed
DEC	6	Falhi Sikunthu 2	Ravee Farooq	Mai Dream Entertainment	Mohamed Abdulla, Zeenath Abbas, Aishath Siyadha, Ibrahim Naseer, Mariyam Haleem, Ahmed Nimal, Niuma Mohamed

== See also ==
- Lists of Maldivian films
