= List of Maldivian films of 2018 =

This is a list of Maldivian films scheduled to release during the year 2018.

== Releases ==
=== Theatre Releases ===
Opening		Title	Genre	Director	Cast	Ref.
FEB	6	Dhevansoora	Suspense/thriller	Yoosuf Shafeeu	Yoosuf Shafeeu, Mariyam Shifa, Fathimath Azifa, Ali Azim	
MAR	5	Vakin Loabin	Family drama	Ali Shifau	Mohamed Jumayyil, Mariyam Majudha, Nuzuhath Shuaib	
MAR	24	Reyvumun	Horror	Amjad Ibrahim	Mohamed Manik, Najihaa Azoor, Mariyam Shakeela	
APR	21	Thiya Loaibaa Dhurah	Romance	Mariyam Moosa	Ahmed Azmeel, Maleeha Waheed	
NOV	10	Bageecha	computer-animated/comedy	Yaamin Rasheed	Mohamed Waheed, Inayath Ali, Aishath Shanaz, Aminath Shama, Raniya Mohamed	

=== Television ===
Opening		Title	Director	Cast	Notes
NOV	29	Huvaa	Fathimath Nahula, Mohamed Faisal	Aminath Rishfa, Mohamed Faisal, Mariyam Azza, Ravee Farooq, Ahmed Easa, Sheela Najeeb, Yoosuf Shafeeu, Ali Azim, Irufana Ibrahim	82 Episodes

== See also ==
- List of Maldivian films of 2019
- Lists of Maldivian films
- List of Maldivian films of 2017
