= List of Maldivian films of 2006 =

This is a list of Maldivian films released in 2006.

== Releases ==
=== Feature film ===
Opening		Title	Director	Studio	Cast
MAR	8	Hukuru Vileyrey	Aishath Rishmy; Aminath Rasheedha	Yaaraa Productions	Yoosuf Shafeeu, Aishath Rishmy, Zeenath Abbas, Mariyam Azza, Aminath Rasheedha, Ahmed Saeed, Mariyam Zuhura
MAY	1	Hithuge Edhun	Amjad Ibrahim	Dhekedheke Ves Productions	Niuma Mohamed, Mohamed Manik, Sheela Najeeb, Mohamed Shavin
JUL	18	Heylaa	Moomin Fuad; Ali Shifau	Dark Rain Entertainment	Ismail Rasheed, Ahmed Mauroof, Zeenath Abbas, Lufshan Shakeeb, Abdulla Muaz
AUG	6	Hiyani	Ahmed Nimal	Dhekedheke Ves Productions	Niuma Mohamed, Ravee Farooq, Ahmed Nimal, Lufshan Shakeeb
DEC	10	Vaaloabi Engeynama	Ahmed Nimal	Red Production	Yoosuf Shafeeu, Mariyam Afeefa, Fathimath Fareela, Fauziyya Hassan, Ali Riyaz

=== Television ===
This is a list of Maldivian series, in which the first episode was aired or streamed in 2006.

Opening		Title	Director	Cast	Notes
APR	02	Kuramey Vadhaaee Salaam	Abdul Faththaah	Mohamed Manik, Mariyam Zuhura, Mariyam Afeefa, Ibrahim Jihad, Ahmed Saeed, Khadheeja Ibrahim Didi	13 Episodes
JUL	26	Hinithun Velaashey Kalaa	Abdul Faththaah	Mohamed Manik, Mariyam Afeefa, Khadheeja Ibrahim Didi, Ibrahim Jihad, Ahmed Saeed	52 Episodes
DEC	14	Nethi Dhiyayas	Mohamed Shareef	Ismail Rasheed, Roanu Hassan Manik, Aminath Rasheedha, Ahmed Saeed	5 Episodes
NA		Beywafaa Viyas	Ali Seezan	Ali Seezan, Niuma Mohamed	
NA		Dhafaraa	Moomin Fuad	Ismail Rasheed, Liraru, Azwaru, Mariyam Rasheedha	13 Episodes
NA		Ikhthiyaaru	Mohamed Shareef	Ahmed Ishaar, Nashidha Mohamed, Hassan Afeef, Mariyam Afeefa, Moosa Zakariyya, Nashidha Mohamed	
NA		Saaraa	Mohamed Shamaail	Mariyam Afeefa, Niuma Mohamed, Khadheeja Ibrahim Didi	13 Episodes
NA		Vaguthu Faaithu Nuvanees	Arifa Ibrahim	Niuma Mohamed, Lufshan Shakeeb, Ahmed Asim, Mariyam Zuhura, Sheela Najeeb	52 Episodes

=== Short film ===
Opening		Title	Director	Studio	Cast
FEB	20	Mohamma Kalo V/S Bao Kalo	Ahmed Nimal	Dheke Dhekeves Productions	Mohamed Abdulla, Khadheeja Ibrahim Didi, Ibrahim Riyaz, Rayyan
MAR	21	Vasvaas 1	Yoosuf Shafeeu	Eupe Productions	Yoosuf Shafeeu, Abdulla Muaz, Hussain Munawwar, Ahmed Ziya
APR	01	Dheke Dhekeves 3	Ahmed Nimal	Dheke Dhekeves Production	Mohamed Abdulla, Mariyam Siyadha, Aminath Rana, Nashidha Mohamed, Fauziyya Hassan
APR	05	Mission 24	Ali Seezan		Ali Seezan, Niuma Mohamed, Aminath Rasheedha, Husnee, Ahmed Shah
JUN	03	Neha	Ahmed Vikash		Lufshan Shakeeb, Zeenath Abbas, Nashidha Mohamed
JUL	31	Ereyge Fahun	Ali Seezan	Apollo Entertainment	Ali Seezan, Zeenath Abbas, Abdulla Munaz, Ibrahim Wisan
SEP	18	Dr. Rocky	Ahmed Saeed		Hussain Shibau, Aminath Ameela
OCT	09	Nukan'daa			
DEC	05	Dheke Dhekeves 4	Ahmed Nimal	Dheke Dhekeves Production	Mohamed Abdulla, Niuma Mohamed, Mariyam Siyadha, Aminath Rana, Nashidha Mohamed
DEC	14	Kudafoolhuge Vasvaas	Ahmed Nimal, Mohamed Manik, Ahmed Saeed	N/A	Hussain Munawwar, Ahmed Saeed, Hussain Shibau, Aishath Rasheedha
NA		Kiss Jazbaath	Ali Seezan	Moviepeople	Ibrahim Wisan, Khadheeja Ibrahim Didi, Ali Seezan, Aminath Ameela
NA		Salhibe	Yoosuf Shafeeu	Eupe Productions	Hussain Nooradeen, Hamdhan Farooq, Mohamed Abdulla, Mariyam Shahuza

== See also ==
- Lists of Maldivian films
