= List of Maldivian films of 2011 =

This is a list of Maldivian films released in 2011.

== Releases ==
=== Feature film ===
Opening		Title	Genre	Director	Cast	Ref.
FEB	2	Hiyy Vindhaa Nulaa	Drama	Mohamed Aboobakuru	Shafiu Mohamed, Mariyam Naajee, Muslima Abdulla, Mariyam Afeefa	
FEB	14	Loodhifa	Crime drama	Moomin Fuad	Ismail Rasheed, Ravee Farooq, Mariyam Afeefa, Fathimath Azifa, Ahmed Saeed, Mohamed Rasheed	
MAR	3	Hafaraaiy	Suspense thriller	Amjad Ibrahim	Ali Shameel, Yoosuf Shafeeu, Mariyam Shakeela, Amira Ismail, Fathimath Fareela	
MAR	29	Sazaa	Romance drama	Hussain Munawwar	Niuma Mohamed, Lufshan Shakeeb, Ismail Rasheed, Fathimath Azifa	
APR	20	Hithey Dheymee	Family drama	Amjad Ibrahim	Amira Ismail, Hussain Solah, Ali Ahmed, Fathimath Azifa, Aminath Shareef, Ali Shameel	
MAY	5	Zaharu	Psychological romantic thriller	Ali Shifau	Ali Seezan, Niuma Mohamed, Sheela Najeeb, Fathmath Aflaz Faisal	
MAY	17	Kuhveriakee Kaakuhey?	Horror romantic thriller	Aishath Ali Manik	Ahmed Azmeel, Aishath Rishmy, Sheereen Abdul Wahid, Aminath Rasheedha, Ahmed Shah	
MAY	31	E Bappa	Family drama	Yoosuf Shafeeu	Yoosuf Shafeeu, Koyya Hassan Manik, Mohamed Manik, Sheela Najeeb, Amira Ismail, Lufshan Shakeeb, Mariyam Shakeela, Fathimath Fareela	
JUN	27	14 Vileyrey	Horror romantic thriller	Abdul Faththaah	Ali Seezan, Mariyam Nisha, Aishath Rishmy, Fauziyya Hassan, Arifa Ibrahim, Roanu Hassan Manik	
SEP	15	Wathan	Action comedy	Ali Seezan	Ali Seezan, Lufshan Shakeeb, Mariyam Siyadha	
SEP	29	Laelaa	Romance	Hamid Ali	Yoosuf Shafeeu, Hamid Ali, Hassan Manik, Amira Ismail, Ahmed Easa, Fathimath Azifa	
OCT	11	Hiyy Yaara Dheefa	Romance drama	Ahmed Azmeel	Ali Seezan, Niuma Mohamed, Ahmed Azmeel, Aishath Rishmy, Aminath Rasheedha	
NOV	29	Insaaf	Action drama	Yoosuf Shafeeu	Ahmed Saeed, Yoosuf Shafeeu, Ahmed Ziya, Ibrahim Jihad, Mohamed Manik	

=== Short film ===
Opening		Title	Director	Studio	Cast
MAR	16	Farihibe 3	Abdulla Muaz	Dhekedheke Ves Production	Mohamed Abdulla, Ismail Rasheed, Mariyam Azza, Aishath Rishmy, Fathimath Azifa, Aminath Rana
OCT	30	Bodu 13 Muassasaa	Ahmed Falah	Afeef Production	Ismail Rasheed, Ahmed Asim, Aishath Rishmy, Fathimath Azifa
DEC	21	Gudhoa Gudhoa	Shareef	IF Productions	Ahmed Aman, Mariyam Shahuza, Irushan, Atheeru, Shagaf, Sadhaath
NA		Siyaasee Vaccine	Abdulla Muaz	Dhekedheke Ves Production	Mohamed Abdulla, Amira Ismail, Ismail Rasheed

=== Television ===
This is a list of Maldivian series, in which the first episode was aired or streamed in 2011.

Opening	Title	Director	Cast	Notes
NA	Furaana Dheynan	Ahmed Saeed	Fathimath Azifa, Ibrahim Jihad, Mariyam Shahuza, Ajunaz Ali	4 Episodes
NA	Hiyy Vanee Inthizaarugai	Mohamed Manik	Mohamed Manik, Sheela Najeeb, Zeenath Abbas	6 Episodes
NA	Naamaan	Ali Shifau	Mohamed Manik, Niuma Mohamed, Ahmed Saeed, Mohamed Faisal	4 Episodes
