= Bridge (web series) =

Maldivian web series

- Genre: Comedy drama
- Story by: Amjad Ibrahim
- Directed by: Amjad Ibrahim
- Country of origin: Maldives
- Original language: Divehi

Production
- Cinematography: Ibrahim Samaah
- Editor: Ravee Farooq
- Production company: Jayz Entertainment

Original release
- Release: April 2 – June 4, 2022

Bridge is a Maldivian comedy drama web series written and directed by Amjad Ibrahim. It stars Sheela Najeeb, Ahmed Shaz, Ali Shameel and Amira Ismail. The pilot episode of the series was released on 2 April 2022 and was concluded on 4 June 2022.

== Cast ==
=== Main ===
- Sheela Najeeb as Areesha
- Ahmed Shaz as Haidhar
- Ali Shameel as Saleem
- Amira Ismail as Laila

=== Recurring ===
- Mariyam Haleem as Abidha: Laila's mother
- Mohamed Anil as Zahir: Laila's father
- Lucian Kyle Bin Mohamed

=== Guest ===
- Abdulla Ayaan as Ayaan
- Umar Arafaath
- Aishath Lahfa as Areesha

== Episodes ==
No.	Title	Directed by	Original release date
1	"Episode 1"	Amjad Ibrahim	April 2, 2022
Saleem catches his friend Haidhar with another woman. Haidhar attempts to manipulate his wife, Areesha, by narrating a fake jinn story which leads Areesha and Saleem to seek the help of a sorcerer. Saleem brings a tiktok star Ayaan who convinces Areesha to leave Haidhar for a while till he regains his consciousness.
2	"Episode 2"	Amjad Ibrahim	April 9, 2022
Haidhar is assured that his girlfriend Laila is a Jinn. Ayaan convinces Areesha into believing Saleem is lying about his supernatural encounter.
3	"Episode 3"	Amjad Ibrahim	April 16, 2022
Laila introduces herself as the soon-to-be wife of Haidhar, much to Areesha's surprise, who demands that he divorce her.
4	"Episode 4"	Amjad Ibrahim	April 23, 2022
Saleem rejoices their separation. Areesha requests Saleem to allow her stay at his house before she departs to her island. Unaware of the truth, Laila strives to validate her love for him.
5	"Episode 5"	Amjad Ibrahim	April 30, 2022
Laila makes surprising appearances at Haidhar's residence, horrifying him. Saleem tries to explain his feelings to Areesha, but hesitates to risk his relationship with Haidhar.
6	"Episode 6"	Amjad Ibrahim	May 7, 2022
Taking hints from Areesha, Saleem finally proposes to her and she agrees. Laila, unable to accept defeat in love, pleads to Haidhar to return to her. Haidhar ultimately agrees to marry Laila if her parents do not object.
7	"Episode 7"	Amjad Ibrahim	May 14, 2022
Abidha consents to their marriage plans but her father favors their relationship. However, as soon as Haidhar comes clean of his previous intention with Laila, her father, disgusted by him, expels him from the house.
8	"Episode 8"	Amjad Ibrahim	May 21, 2022
Areesha marries Saleem and continues to live happily together despite Haidhar's obstruction. Meanwhile, a jinn disguised as Laila, is after Haidhar, after their encounter at Bridge. The jinn warns him to accept her marriage proposal, if he wishes to remain sane. The same night, the real Laila comes with her parents agreeing to their relationship.
9	"Episode 9"	Amjad Ibrahim	May 28, 2022
10	"Episode 10"	Amjad Ibrahim	June 4, 2022

== Development ==
The project was announced by director Amjad Ibrahim on 22 August 2021 as a potential web series or a feature film. Major part of the series was filmed in Hulhumale'. Filming was completed in the first week of September and editing was initiated by Ravee Farooq on 4 September 2021.

== Soundtrack ==
Track listing
No.	Title	Length
1.	"Ishqeege Theerun"

== Release and reception ==
On 8 October 2021, director Amjad Ibrahim announced that the series will be streamed through digital streaming platform Baiskoafu. The first episode of the series was released on 2 April 2022 in Baiskoafu, on the occasion of Ramadan 1443.
