= List of Maldivian films of 2017 =

This is a list of Maldivian films released in 2017.

== Releases ==
=== Theatre releases ===
Opening		Title	Genre	Director	Cast	Ref.
MAR	2	Malikaa	Romance	Ali Musthafa	Mohamed Jumayyil, Nuzuhath Shuaib, Fathimath Azifa, Ali Azim	
MAR	8	Vishka	Crime/thriller	Ravee Farooq	Aishath Rishmy, Ravee Farooq, Ahmed Saeed	
APR	5	Mee Loaybakee	Romance/comedy	Ali Shifau	Mohamed Jumayyil, Mariyam Azza	
APR	27	Ill Noise	Drama	Ismail Nihad	Mohamed Munthasir, Ahmed Alam, Shammath Ibrahim, Ahmed Nimal	
AUG	2	Naughty 40	Comedy	Yoosuf Shafeeu	Yoosuf Shafeeu, Mohamed Manik, Ahmed Saeed, Ali Seezan	
SEP	6	Hahdhu	Romance	Abdul Faththaah	Mariyam Azza, Aminath Rishfa, Ahmed Shiban	
SEP	27	Neydhen Vakivaakah	Romance	Mohamed Aboobakuru	Jadhulla Ismail, Fathimath Azifa, Yoosuf Shafeeu	
OCT	31	Bos	Romance	Aishath Rishmy	Mariyam Azza, Mohamed Yunaan, Ibrahim Jihad, Fathimath Azifa	

== See also ==
- List of Maldivian films of 2018
- Lists of Maldivian films
- List of Maldivian films of 2016
