= List of Maldivian films of 2012 =

This is a list of Maldivian films released in 2012.

== Releases ==
=== Theatre releases ===
Opening		Title	Genre	Director	Cast	Ref.
FEB	28	Mihashin Furaana Dhandhen	Romance drama	Ravee Farooq	Niuma Mohamed, Mohamed Manik, Ali Seezan, Roanu Hassan Manik, Ahmed Nimal	
MAR	28	Love Story	Romance	Abdul Faththaah	Ali Seezan, Amira Ismail, Aishath Rishmy, Mohamed Manik, Sheela Najeeb, Roanu Hassan Manik	

=== Short films ===
Opening		Title	Director	Cast	Ref.
APR	19	Voodoo	Ali Shifau	Dark Rain Entertainment	Ahmed Nashith, Ahmed Rifau, Umar Ashfaq, Ahmed Hafiz, Shifra Ilham, Abdulla Naseer
APR	25	Island Thief	Ahmed Latheef	Actional Movie	Ahmed Aman, Hamdhan Farooq, Mariyam Shahuza, Sujeetha Abdulla
MAY	10	Mammaa Ey	Ahmed Nimal	Movie Maldives	Ahmed Nimal, Mariyam Afeefa
JUL	06	Dheke Dhekeves 6	Hassan Haleem	Dheke Dhekeves Production	Mohamed Abdulla, Nadhiya Hassan, Mariyam Haleem, Roanu Hassan Manik
SEP	24	Kidnap	Ahmed Nimal	Farivaa Films	Niuma Mohamed, Ismail Rasheed, Ahmed Asim
DEC	03	Safaru Kaiydha 2	Amjad Ibrahim	VStream	Hussain Shibau
NA		13 Ah Visnaa Dhehaas	Abdulla Muaz	Dhekedheke Ves Production	Mohamed Abdulla, Niuma Mohamed, Ismail Rasheed, Fathimath Azifa
NA		Loabeege Nimumeh Neiy	Amjad Ibrahim	VStream	Ahmed Asim

=== Television ===
This is a list of Maldivian series, in which the first episode was aired or streamed in 2012.

Opening		Title	Director	Cast	Title
JUL	21	Adhives Eloaibah Gadharu Kuran	Fathimath Nahula	Fathimath Fareela, Mohamed Faisal, Abdul Latheef, Aminath Rishfa, Fathimath Mufliha, Mariyam Shakeela	5 Episodes
JUL	22	Dhirumeh Nethas	Ahmed Nimal	Lufshan Shakeeb, Nashidha Mohamed, Ahmed Nimal, Ibrahim Jihad, Ali Fizam, Nadhiya Hassan, Niuma Mohamed, Aminath Ameela	5 Episodes
AUG	3	Kaiveni	Abdul Faththaah	Mariyam Zuhura, Ali Azim, Neena Saleem, Yooshau Jameel	5 Episodes
NA		Case 34	Mohamed Manik	Mohamed Manik, Sheela Najeeb, Amira Ismail, Ismail Rasheed	Teledrama
NA		San'dhuraveerey		Fathimath Azifa, Hamdhoon Farooq	5 Episodes
