= Bulhaa Dhombe =

- Official film poster
- Directed by: Yoosuf Shafeeu
- Written by: Ibrahim Waheed; Fathimath Nahula
- Produced by: Fathimath Nahula
- Starring: Sheela Najeeb; Koyya Hassan Manik; Mohamed Faisal; Raaidh; Fathimath Aflaz Faisal
- Cinematography: Hassan Haleem
- Edited by: Yoosuf Shafeeu
- Music by: Ayyuman Shareef
- Production companies: Crystal Entertainment; Eupe Productions
- Release date: 2009
- Running time: 65 minutes
- Country: Maldives
- Language: Dhivehi

Bulhaa Dhombe is a 2009 Maldivian short children's film directed by Yoosuf Shafeeu. Produced by Fathimath Nahula under Crystal Entertainment, the film stars Sheela Najeeb, Hassan Haleem, Mohamed Faisal, Raaidh and Fathimath Aflaz Faisal in pivotal roles. Filming took place in K. Thulusdhoo.

== Premise ==
Faathun (Fathimath Aflaz Faisal) and Ahmed (Raaidh) are two siblings who are poles apart in their negotiations. The former is the acquiescent and thoughtful child and the latter is more of a rebellious child who avoids studying. Receiving complaints from their neighbor, Raaid's mother (Sheela Najeeb) suspects he is dumping school though Faathun continuously covers up for him. Raaid frames his classmate Aabid for theft despite promising his family to rectify his behavior. The next morning Raaid wakes up, turned into a cat, much to the surprise of Faathun. Everyone in the island searches for him while Faathun takes care of the cat reluctant to disclose his identity.

== Cast ==
- Sheela Najeeb as Raaid's mother
- Koyya Hassan Manik as Mudhinbe
- Mohamed Faisal as teacher
- Raaidh as Ahmed
- Fathimath Aflaz Faisal as Faathun
- Shaifaan Shaheem as Aabid
- Abdulla Mahir as Raaid's father
- Yooshau as Jaufar; Aabid's father

== Soundtrack ==
Track listing
No.	Title	Length
1.	"Lobuvethi Furaana"	4:48
