= Dhoapatta =

- Genre: Romantic drama
- Written by: Abdul Faththaah
- Screenplay by: Abdul Faththaah
- Directed by: Abdul Faththaah
- Starring: Jamsheedha Ahmed; Mohamed Shavin; Sheela Najeeb; Niuma Mohamed
- No. of seasons: 1
- No. of episodes: 5

Production
- Cinematography: Abdulla Shameel
- Running time: 50-55 minutes

Original release
- Network: Television Maldives
- Release: 2000

Dhoapatta is a Maldivian romantic drama television series developed for Television Maldives by Abdul Faththaah. The series stars Jamsheedha Ahmed, Mohamed Shavin, Sheela Najeeb and Niuma Mohamed in pivotal roles.

== Premise ==
Ruqiyya (Haajara Abdul Kareem), a gluttonous woman and a local medicine practitioner forces her step-daughter, Aminath (Sheela Najeeb) to marry a wealthy old businessman, Gadhir. Fayaz (Mohamed Shavin) visits Ha. Kelaa for medication from Ruqiyya where he meets Aminath and her childhood friend Nasiha (Jamsheedha Ahmed). Nasiha is attracted to Fayaz though she is in a serious relationship with a short-tempered dominant man, Shahid (Ashraf Numaan) while Aminath shows interest in Fayaz too. Fayaz proposes to Nasiha and reveals his intention to Aminath, breaking her heart. Nasiha keeps flirting with Fayaz only to prove her "capability" and to "win a bet", despite loving Shahid more than Fayaz. However, as they start spending more time together, Nasiha realizes that it is Fayaz who can enlighten her future with contentment. Failed in love, Aminath agrees to marry Gadhir and leaves with him.

== Cast and characters ==
=== Main ===
- Jamsheedha Ahmed as Nasiha
- Mohamed Shavin as Fayaz Adam
- Sheela Najeeb as Aminath
- Niuma Mohamed as Mary

=== Recurring ===
- Haajara Abdul Kareem as Ruqiyya; Aminath's step-mother
- Mariyam Shakeela as Nasiha's sister
- Neena Saleem as Faathun; Nasiha's friend
- Ashraf Numaan as Shahid
- Koyya Hassan Manik as Adam; Fayaz's father
- Aminath Rasheedha as Mary's mother
- Arifa Ibrahim as Nasiha's sister
- Ali Ibrahim as Junaid

=== Guest ===
- Hassan Yoosuf
- Fauziyya Hassan as Fayaz's mother

== Soundtrack ==
Track listing
No.	Title	Lyrics	Singer(s)	Length
1.	"Hoadhumah Dhaanan"	Easa Shareef	Mukhthar Adam, Shifa Thaufeeq
2.	"Masthu Vevuney Kalaa Balaaleema"		Ali Rameez
3.	"Veyn Libeythee Ey"	Ahmed Shakeeb	Mohamed Huzam, Shifa Thaufeeq
4.	"Hadhiyaa Badhal Vanee Ey"	Kopee Mohamed Rasheed	Abdul Baaree, Shifa Thaufeeq
5.	"Farudha Mi Hiyy Kureema"	Ahmed Shakeeb	Mohamed Zaid, Aishath Inaya
