= List of Maldivian films of 2015 =

This is a list of Maldivian films released during 2015.

== Releases ==
=== Feature film ===
Opening		Title	Genre	Director	Cast	Ref.
FEB	26	Randhari	Drama	Mohamed Aboobakuru	Ahmed Nimal, Fathimath Azifa, Ali Azim, Ibrahim Jihad	
APR	5	Emme Fahu Vindha Jehendhen	Romance/drama	Ali Shifau	Mohamed Jumayyil, Mariyam Majudha, Ali Azim, Mohamed Manik, Sheela Najeeb	
AUG	12	Mikoe Bappa Baey Baey	Suspense/thriller	Ravee Farooq	Mohamed Manik, Aishath Rishmy, Koyya Hassan Manik	
NOV	6	Ahsham	Action	Ali Seezan	Ali Seezan, Ahmed Saeed, Aminath Rishfa, Zeenath Abbas, Arifa Ibrahim	

=== Television ===
This is a list of Maldivian series, in which the first episode was aired or streamed in 2015.

Opening		Title	Director	Cast	Notes
FEB	13	Vakivumuge Kurin	Fathimath Nahula, Aishath Rishmy	Mohamed Faisal, Aishath Rishmy, Sheela Najeeb, Aminath Rishfa, Ahmed Azmeel, Mariyam Shahuza, Ahmed Aman, Mariyam Azza, Aminath Rasheedha, Ibrahim Jihad	15 Episodes
NOV	07	Umurah Salaam	Fathimath Nahula, Mohamed Faisal	Mohamed Faisal, Aminath Rishfa, Mariyam Azza, Ahmed Azmeel, Mariyam Haleem, Fathimath Mufliha	13 Episodes
