= Kahvalhah Dhaandhen =

2002 Maldivian film

- Official film poster
- Directed by: Amjad Ibrahim
- Written by: Moosa Said
- Screenplay by: Amjad Ibrahim
- Produced by: Shiham Rasheed
- Starring: Yoosuf Shafeeu; Sheela Najeeb
- Cinematography: Ahmed Shaniz
- Music by: Mohamed Madheeh
- Production company: Motion Pictures
- Release date: July 31, 2002
- Country: Maldives
- Language: Dhivehi

Kahvalhah Dhaandhen is a 2002 Maldivian drama film directed by Amjad Ibrahim. Produced by Hassan Ali under Dash Studio, the film stars Yoosuf Shafeeu and Sheela Najeeb in pivotal roles.

== Cast ==
- Yoosuf Shafeeu as Viyaam
- Sheela Najeeb as Yashmee
- Kausar as Sudha
- Mohamed Shavin as Zahid
- Ahmed Shah as Areesh
- Neena Saleem as Nujey
- Mariyam Haleem

== Soundtrack ==
Track listing
No.	Title	Lyrics	Singer(s)	Length
1.	"Mihithun Loabi Dhevidhaaney"	Adam Naseer Ibrahim	Abdul Baaree, Fathimath Zoona
2.	"Nan Kalaage Hama Eba Liyevey"		Fathimath Rauf, Ibrahim Rameez
3.	"Magey Hithuge Shakuvaa"		Aishath Inaya
4.	"Loabivaa Mee Hithey (Male Version)"	Ahmed Sharumeel	Hassan Ilham
5.	"Loabivaa Mee Hithey (Female Version)"	Ahmed Sharumeel	Shifa Thaufeeq
6.	"Abadhu Thiya Loabi"	Shifa Thaufeeq	Ali Rameez, Shifa Thaufeeq
7.	"Ey Fari Maushooqa"		Abdul Baaree
8.	"Alivaa Alivaa Nooru"		Fathimath Rauf, Mohamed Huzam
