= Huras =

1996 Maldivian film

- Official film poster
- Directed by: Amjad Ibrahim
- Written by: Amjad Ibrahim
- Screenplay by: Amjad Ibrahim; Ali Rasheed
- Produced by: Hussain Rasheed
- Starring: Hassan Afeef; Mariyam Rasheedha; Vazuna Ahmed; Koyya Hassan Manik; Arifa Ibrahim
- Cinematography: Ali Rasheed
- Edited by: Ali Rasheed
- Music by: Mohamed Rasheed
- Production company: Farivaa Films
- Release date: October 25, 1996
- Country: Maldives
- Language: Dhivehi

Huras is a 1996 Maldivian comedy drama film written and directed by Amjad Ibrahim. Produced by Hussain Rasheed under Farivaa Films, the film stars Hassan Afeef, Mariyam Rasheedha, Vazuna Ahmed, Koyya Hassan Manik and Arifa Ibrahim in pivotal roles.

The film marks Amjad Ibrahim's first direction. The project was expanded solely with the intention of winning Gaumee Film Awards. However, the film failed to garner any award at 2nd Gaumee Film Awards ceremony which resulted Ibrahim focusing more into commercial film making.

== Plot ==
Zeeniya (Mariyam Rasheedha) and Soniya (Vazuna Ahmed) are two rival siblings studying in the same class. Anil (Hassan Afeef) is their new recruited teacher who is romantically attracted to Zeeniya. Soniya discovers a photograph of Anil on Zeeniya's bed and intends to break their relationship. Zeeniya and Anil's affair spread in the island which their aunt, Hawwa (Arifa Ibrahim) differs to believe.

Anil took his students on a picnic trip to a nearby island where Soiya witnesses their true love. Hawwa confronts Zeeniya to end her relationship with Anil but she secretly kept meeting him every day. Upon hearing the news, enraged, Zeeniya's brother Adam Manik (Koyya Hassan Manik) tears her uniform and restricts her from going outside. Zeeniya and Anil were caught in a room. Adam Manik assaults Anil and dragged Zeeniya to home.

== Cast ==
- Hassan Afeef as Anil
- Mariyam Rasheedha as Zeeniya
- Vazuna Ahmed as Soniya
- Koyya Hassan Manik as Adam Manik
- Arifa Ibrahim as Hawwa
- Chilhiya Moosa Manik (special appearance)

== Soundtrack ==
Track listing
No.	Title	Lyrics	Singer(s)	Length
1.	"Meygaa Rihumeh Vaathee"	Jaufar Abdul Rahman	Shifa Thaufeeq
2.	"Dheyshey Vaanee Hoadhan Dhaanee"	Jaufar Abdul Rahman	Fathimath Zoona
3.	"Reygaa Khiyaal Kureemey"	Jaufar Abdul Rahman	Abdul Hannan Moosa Didi, Fathimath Zoona
4.	"Reygaa Khiyaal Kureemey" (Slow version)	Jaufar Abdul Rahman	Abdul Hannan Moosa Didi
5.	"Ehandhaan Hithun Filuveynebaa"	Jaufar Abdul Rahman	Abdul Hannan Moosa Didi
6.	"Five Jaanaai Hithaa"	Jaufar Abdul Rahman	Abdul Hannan Moosa Didi
