= List of Maldivian films of 1995 =

This is a list of Maldivian films released in 1995.

== Releases ==
=== Feature film ===
| Opening | | Title | Director | Studio | Cast |
|---|---|---|---|---|---|
| APR | 25 | Dhehithehge Loabi | Hussain Adil | Farivaa Films | Mariyam Nisha, Abdul Rahman Rauf, Ahmed Sharmeel |
| NOV | 01 | Dhushman | Mohamed Shiyaz | Farivaa Films | Mariyam Nisha, Hussain Sobah, Aminath Rasheedha, Hamid Ali |
| NA | | Biru | Mohamed Rasheed | Slam Studio | Mariyam Nisha, Reeko Moosa Manik, Abdulla Faisal, Ibrahim Rasheed |
| NA | | Masthu | Yoosuf Rafeeu | Bukhari Films | Mariyam Nisha, Yoosuf Rafeeu, Sofoora, Ali Firaaq, Sithi Fulhu |

== See also ==
- Lists of Maldivian films
