= Kamana Vareh Neiy =

Maldivian TV series

- Written by: Mariyam Moosa
- Directed by: Amjad Ibrahim
- Starring: Ali Shameel; Sheela Najeeb; Fauziyya Hassan
- Music by: Hussain Sobah
- Country of origin: Maldives
- Original language: Divehi
- No. of seasons: 1
- No. of episodes: 5

Production
- Producer: Aboobakuru Mohamed
- Cinematography: Ali Rasheed
- Editor: Hussain Adhil
- Running time: 27-33 minutes

Original release
- Release: 2004

Kamana Vareh Neiy is Maldivian comedy drama television series directed by Amjad Ibrahim. Developed by Television Maldives and written by Mariyam Moosa, it stars Ali Shameel, Sheela Najeeb and Fauziyya Hassan in main roles. The series follows the lives of three womanizers, Yoonus, Qadhir and Yahuya, who betray their devoted wives out of no respect.

== Cast and characters ==
=== Main ===
- Ali Shameel as Yoonus
- Sheela Najeeb as Lubna
- Fauziyya Hassan as Kamana
- Mohamed Shavin as Mahil
- Hamid Wajeeh as Qadhir
- Ajuwad Waheed as Yahuya
- Hamid Ali as Aadhanu
- Khadheeja Ibrahim Didi as Muna; Mahil's girlfriend
- Koyya Hassan Manik as Hashim

=== Recurring ===
- Arifa Ibrahim as Fareedha; wife of Yahuya
- Sameema as Yoonus's mother
- Marikko as the daughter of Kamana and Yoonus
- Mohamed Vishan Aboobakuru as Mazin; son of Kamana and Yoonus
- Shadhiya as Yahuya's love interest
- Hussain Munawwar as Hussain; second eldest son of Kamana and Yoonus
- Mariyam Haleem as Rameeza; Aadhanu's wife
- Mohamed Manik as Fayaz; Lubna's boyfriend

=== Guest ===
- Mareena as Mareena; an actress (Episode 1)
- Sheereen Abdul Wahid as an actress (Episode 2)
- Ahmed Asim as an actor (Episode 2 and 4)
- Ahmed Ziya as a journalist (Episode 2)
- Saiman as Shivrin; a journalist (Episode 2)
- Mohamed Faisal as an actor (Episode 4)
- Ahmed Azmeel as an actor (Episode 4)
- Ali Ahmed as an actor (Episode 4)
- Haisham (Episode 4)
- Hamdhan Farooq as Hamdhan (Episode 5)
- Yoosuf Solih as a journalist (Episode 5)

== Episodes ==
No. in season	Title	Directed by
1	"Episode 1"	Amjad Ibrahim
Yoonus (Ali Shameel), a clever husband who keeps his wife, Kamana (Fauziyya Hassan) in the dark, arranges a weekend picnic trip to a nearby island with his friends, Aadhanu (Hamid Ali) and Qadhir (Hamid Wajeeh), two other middle-aged womanizers. The latter desperately tries to get back with his wife, Fareedha (Arifa Ibrahim) who got separated due to his extramarital affairs, while the former remains extra cautious as his wife Rameeza, starts suspecting him. On their way to Villingili, the friends come across a pretty young woman, Lubna (Sheela Najeeb).
2	"Episode 2"	Amjad Ibrahim
The trio convinces Lubna to star in one of their films and accompanies her to a passionate screen testing. Wife of Aadhanu, Rameeza and Kamana discuss on how they must fully trust their husbands, until they are found guilty of any affairs. The eldest son of Kamana, Mahil (Mohamed Shavin) goes to Villingili with his girlfriend, Muna (Khadheeja Ibrahim Didi) and catches his father in the photoshoot, which causes him discomfort.
3	"Episode 3"	Amjad Ibrahim
Yoonus continues his affair with Lubna while Kamana stays home as a devoted wife. Mahil catches them together going to an abandoned house but fails to morally uplift his mother. However, Mahil's uncle, Hashim (Koyya Hassan Manik) along with Yahuya (Ajuwad Waheed) expose his extramarital affair to Kamana.
4	"Episode 4"	Amjad Ibrahim
Hashim and Yahuya advises Kamana to stay strong and teaches her to be empowered, who throws Yoonus off her house once he returns home. Yoonus and his mother (Sameema) moves to the apartment in which Lubna resides and they are accompanied by Muna as a maid. Lubna is overwhelmed with the additional burden of family responsibilities and regret her choice of dumping her boyfriend Fayaz (Mohamed Manik) over her modeling career.
5	"Episode 5"	Amjad Ibrahim
The whole family of Yoonus joins together and aided by Hashim and Yahuya avenge on Lubna and make every possible efforts to reunite Yoonus and Kamana while the latter transforms into a sensation, desperately seeking attention from Yoonus. He ultimately realizes the worth of what he lost and gets back with Kamana while Lubna goes back to Fayaz.

== Soundtrack ==
Track listing
No.	Title	Lyrics	Music	Singer(s)	Length
1.	"Kurin Bunefa"	Mohamed Naeem	Mohamed Naeem	Feeali Waheed
2.	"Mariyam Maley Thee Magey Loabivaa"
3.	"Anhen Kujjaku Fenumun"			Mukhthar Adam
4.	"Hiyy Edheythee Loabi Edhuneemey"
5.	"Ithubaaru Dheefa Loabin"
