= Bageecha =

- Official film poster
- Directed by: Yamin Rasheed
- Screenplay by: Yamin Rasheed; Mohamed Waheed
- Story by: Yamin Rasheed
- Production company: Cellmin Animation Studio
- Release date: November 10, 2018
- Running time: 50 minutes
- Country: Maldives
- Language: Dhivehi
- Budget: MVR 1,200,000

Bageecha is a 2018 Maldivian animated comedy film directed by Yamin Rasheed. Produced under Cellmin Animation Studio, it marks the first Maldivian 3D animated cartoon film release for cinema. The film revolves around a man's adventure to sustain a happy family with his four wives. It was released on 10 November 2018.

== Voice cast ==
- Mohamed Waheed
- Inayath Ali
- Aishath Shanaz
- Aminath Shama
- Raniya Mohamed
- Kama Najeeb

== Development ==
Story of the film was being written by Yamin Rasheed during 2010, before it was stalled due to the tight schedule of then ongoing animated comedy TV series Maakana Show which is also written and directed by Yamin. After quitting the latter, Yamin resumed the story from where it was left and developed the story to a screenplay before the animation process begins.

== Release ==
The trailer of the film was released on 11 September 2012. It was initially planned to release the film in October 2012, though the release date was later postponed since the cinema was closed for renovation during the time. The film was premiered on 10 November 2018 at Schwack Cinema by then president-elect of Maldives Ibrahim Mohamed Solih.
