= List of Maldivian films of 2013 =

This is a list of Maldivian films released in 2013.

== Releases ==
=== Theatre releases ===
Opening		Title	Genre	Director	Cast	Ref.
APR	5	Fathis Handhuvaruge Feshun 3D	Horror/romance	Ali Shifau	Yoosuf Shafeeu, Fathimath Fareela, Mohamed Faisal, Ahmed Saeed, Ahmed Nimal	
MAY	16	Ingili	Experimental suspense thriller	Ravee Farooq	Ismail Rasheed, Abdulla Muaz	
MAY	27	Dhilakani	Romance/thriller	Hussain Munawwar	Ismail Rasheed, Niuma Mohamed, Aminath Rishfa, Mohamed Manik, Mohamed Faisal	

=== Short film ===
Opening	Title	Director	Studio	Cast
NA	Farihibe 4	Abdulla Muaz	Dhekedheke Ves Production	Mohamed Abdulla, Ismail Rasheed, Aishath Rishmy, Aishath Rishmy, Mariyam Haleem

=== Television ===
Opening		Title	Director	Cast	Note
JAN	04	Adhives Eloaibah Gadharu Kuran 2	Fathimath Nahula	Fathimath Fareela, Mohamed Faisal, Aminath Rishfa, Ahmed Latheef, Fathimath Mufliha, Mariyam Shakeela, Neena Saleem	13 Episodes
AUG	03	Vaudhey Mee	Abdul Faththaah	Mohamed Manik, Aishath Rishmy, Aminath Ameela, Ahmed Nimal, Ahmed Saeed, Zeenath Abbas	13 Episodes
