= Ainbehge Loabi Firiehge Vaajib =

- Official film poster
- Directed by: Amjad Ibrahim
- Written by: Ahmed Sharmeel
- Screenplay by: Amjad Ibrahim
- Produced by: Shiham Rasheed
- Starring: Yoosuf Shafeeu; Jamsheedha Ahmed; Arifa Ibrahim
- Cinematography: Ali Rasheed
- Edited by: Hussain Mauzoom
- Music by: Hussain Sobah
- Production company: Motion Pictures
- Release date: 2000
- Country: Maldives
- Language: Dhivehi

Ainbehge Loabi Firiehge Vaajib is a 2000 Maldivian drama film directed by Amjad Ibrahim. Produced by Shiham Rasheed under Motion Picture, the film stars Yoosuf Shafeeu, Jamsheedha Ahmed and Arifa Ibrahim in pivotal roles.

== Plot ==
Julia (Jamsheedha Ahmed) is being ill-treated by her step-mother Zahidha (Arifa Ibrahim), who is looking after Julia after her father's death. Trying to evade from her responsibilities, Zahidha plans to marry her off to an elderly person. One day, when Julia was walking to a nearby shop, she has been teased by a hideous man Hazaar (Yoosuf Shafeeu) flirting with her. She instantly lashes out to him and walked back to her house. On seeing her younger sister Vileena (Neena Saleem) with her lover, Julia wishes to marry someone and start a happy life.

Zahidha sets off Julia's marriage with Hazaar for money, since Hazaar is searching for a wife to look after his son from another marriage. Before finalising the deal, Zahidha mentions the debt of MVR 60,000 which Julia's father took as loan and failed to payback before his death, which Hazaar paid immediately. Julia's bestfirend Dhiyana (Niuma Mohamed) advised her to marry Haazar and she agrees to marry him on one condition; to divorce upon her request. They get married but Julia insisted she waits at Zahidha's place and Hazaar accepted.

Julia falls sick and Zahidha disown her while Hazaar took care of her, making her realize the affection he has towards her. Ultimately, Julia agrees to move in to Hazaar's place. After Julia moved to Hazaar's place, Zahidha falls ill and was treated badly by her two daughters. One day, when Hazaar's mother went for shopping Hazaar's son Naail (Mifzal Ahmed) fell from a chair and Julia failed to respond. The next day Naail burnt his finger a little but to Hazaar's surprise Julia treated him and started taking care of Naail as her own son.

On her way to a party, Julia meets a handsome guy Shafiu (Yoosuf Shafeeu), whom she likes instantly though he actually is Hazaar disguised as another man. Julia misplaced her purse on Shafiu's car and he returns it to Julia while requesting to meet her the next day. They both fall in love and Julia informs about her relationship to Hazaar. Rumors spread in the island about Julia and Shafiu's affair tarnishing Hazaar's reputation. Julia asks for a divorce admitting that she has no feelings for Hazaar. Julia leaves the house and reveals her marriage status to Shafiu. Hazaar's mother came to Julia begging for her return, which she politely declines.

Shafiu disapproved to continue the affair realizing she is married to someone else and calls off their relationship. Julia returned to Hazaar asking for forgiveness and promised she will stay with him. Hazaar went to toilet and reveals himself as Shafiu much to Julia's surprise.

== Cast ==
- Yoosuf Shafeeu as Hazaar / Shafiu
- Jamsheedha Ahmed as Julia
- Arifa Ibrahim as Zahidha
- Mifzal Ahmed as Naail
- Yumna as Zuhudha
- Niuma Mohamed as Dhiyana
- Neena Saleem as Vileena
- Zeenath Abbas as Lillian
- Mariyam Haleem as Hazaar's mother
- Sithi Fulhu as Kuda Kaiydhaa Fulhu
- Ahmed Saeed as Vileena's fiancé

== Soundtrack ==
Track listing
No.	Title	Lyrics	Singer(s)	Length
1.	"Vaareyaa Themi Foaveema"		Umar Zahir, Shifa Thaufeeq
2.	"Mithuraa Libumunney"	Adam Haleem Adnan	Abdul Baaree
3.	"Veynugaa Kuramey Dhuaa" (Male version)	Ahmed Sharumeel	Ali Rameez
4.	"Veynugaa Kuramey Dhuaa" (Female version)	Ahmed Sharumeel	Shifa Thaufeeq
5.	"Mi Binmatheege Chaalu Handhey"		Mohamed Huzam
6.	"Muniya"	Ahmed Sharumeel	Zahiyya Thaufeeq
7.	"Hoadhaadheyshey Yaaraa"	Ahmed Riza (Tharaboozu)	Fathimath Zoona
8.	"Jismu Hibain Dhinee"	Ahmed Sharumeel	Mohamed Huzam, Shifa Thaufeeq
9.	"Muniya" (Slow version)	Ahmed Sharumeel	Shifa Thaufeeq

== Accolades ==
Award	Category	Recipients	Result
3rd Gaumee Film Awards	Best Supporting Actress	Arifa Ibrahim	Won
