= Dhivehi beys =

Dhivehi beys is the local Dhivehi name given to the Traditional Medicine of the Maldives and Minicoy, Lakshadweep or the Dweep Unani / Dheebu Yoonaanee, the islanders' system of herbal medicine. The term Dhivehi means Islanders' and beys means medicine. Dweep is another word used for islands and Unani is the term for Hippocratic humoral system of herbal medicine practised in South Asia.

== History ==
The Maldive Islanders still rely on traditional medicine men and women. At the crossroads of the Indian Ocean, healing secrets from Indians, Arabs, Persians, Malaysians, Sri Lankans and Chinese were acquired and synthesised, then used to develop local herbal remedies.

Legends abound about the feats of such special healers as "Buraki Ranin", the sixteenth-century queen of Sultan Muhamed, who was said to cure sword wounds overnight with her own dressings. The treatise written by El-Sheikh Ahmed didi of Meedhoo (Seenu Atoll) who died in 1937 forms the foundation of today's traditional medicine. Known as hakeems, practitioners of this medicine are well respected by the village communities.

A basic tenet of their philosophy is that good health is a result of a proper balance between the hot, cold and dry "humours" in the body, so "cold food" is recommended for someone with fever, and dry fish for flu. Some hakeems are schooled in "Unani" medicine, which treats the whole person, combining ancient remedies with new drugs. In recent years there has been an attempt to integrate traditional and modern medicine.

Advice and training, for instance, is offered to local midwives who learned their skill from older practitioners. Arabic system of Graeco-Islamic medicine in Maldives was introduced by Arabs. Unani medicine soon got acceptance by the masses due to its efficacy and non-toxicity of the drugs.

El-shaikh Ahmed didi ( son of El-Shaikh alhafiz Ibrahim thakurfan (Aisaabeegedharu Dhonbeyya) died in 1937 was most dedicated scholar of Arabic system of medicine in Maldives. He was known for his book Tibbl Fuqara fee hikmathil Umarai based on his lifelong clinical experience. He referred to more than 20 books and encyclopaedias of Arabic in his book. He was the first person who opened the research in old Dhivehi system of medicine. He examined Dhivehi medicine in the light of unani medicine.

Several spas in resorts are now adapting this traditional medicine with modern techniques and hygiene to offer tourists as taste of Dhivehi Beys. The first to create this was Kurumba Maldives quickly followed by Javvu Spa at Amilla Maldives Resort and Residences.
