= Aaah (film) =

2001 film by Amjad Ibrahim

- Official film poster
- Directed by: Amjad Ibrahim
- Produced by: Abdulla Shafeeq
- Starring: Yoosuf Shafeeu; Mohamed Shavin; Ibrahim Giyas; Sheela Najeeb; Jamsheedha Ahmed
- Release date: 2001
- Country: Maldives
- Language: Dhivehi

Aaah is a 2001 Maldivian drama film directed by Amjad Ibrahim. Produced by Abdulla Shafeeq, the film stars Yoosuf Shafeeu, Mohamed Shavin, Ibrahim Giyas, Sheela Najeeb and Jamsheedha Ahmed in pivotal roles.

== Premise ==
Faisal (Mohamed Shavin) hires Ruwaisha (Sheela Najeeb) as his personal secretary, and they develop a romantic relationship before getting married. Faisal travels with his wife and younger brother, Mifzal (Ibrahim Giyas), to Maamingili for a business project to open a shop catering to tourists. There, they meet Aisha (Jamsheedha Ahmed), the adopted daughter of Javid, a friend of Faisal's father, Thaufeeq (Koyya Hassan Manik). Mifzal proposes to Aisha, and they enjoy their time on the island until Aisha's husband, Junaid (Yoosuf Shafeeu), arrives.

== Cast ==
- Yoosuf Shafeeu as Junaid
- Mohamed Shavin as Faisal
- Ibrahim Giyas as Mifzal
- Sheela Najeeb as Ruwaisha
- Jamsheedha Ahmed as Aisha
- Koyya Hassan Manik as Thaufeeq
- Amjad Ibrahim as Javid
- Sakeena as Mifzal & Faisal's mother

== Soundtrack ==
Track listing
No.	Title	Lyrics	Singer(s)	Length
1.	"Mavaanan Qurubaan"	Adam Haleem Adnan	Abdul Baaree
2.	"Moonekey Jaazubee"	Adam Haleem Adnan	Ali Rameez
3.	"Vee Athuga Hifan Hey?"	Easa Shareef	Ibrahim Amir, Fazeela Amir
4.	"Oagaavee Heyo Hithakun"		Mohamed Huzam, Shifa Thaufeeq
5.	"Vaanvee Maruhey"	Adam Haleem Adnan	Umar Zahir
6.	"Veynugaa Roalumun"		Fathimath Rauf, Abdul Baaree
7.	"Loabin Mi Hithugaa"		Ali Rameez
8.	"Hingi Haadhisaain"		Fathimath Rauf
