= List of Hong Kong films of 1958 =

The following films were produced in Hong Kong in 1958.

== 1958 ==
Title	Director	Cast	Genre	Notes
1958
A Beautiful Girl at War	Ng Wui	Lee Ching, Tsi Law-Lin, Siu Yin-Fei, Yip Ping, Chan Ho-Kau, Gam Lau, Chan Lap-Ban	Romance Drama	
Adultery	Wong Hang			
The Angel	Li Han Hsiang			
An Appointment After Dark	Ho Meng Hua			
Autumn Comes To Purple Rose Garden	Chun Kim			
Beauty Fades From Twelve Ladies Bower				
The Beauty Who Lived Through Great Changes				
Beware of Pickpockets	Doe Ching	Jeanette Lin Tsui, Peter Chen Ho, Man Lan, Leung Sing-Bo, Kao Hsiang	Crime	
Big Clumsy Melon				
The Blessed Family	Li Han Hsiang			
The Brilliant Boy Who Caught The Thief				
A Buddhist Recluse For 14 Years	Cheung Wai Gwong			
Bugles Of War	Poon Bing Kuen			
Driver No. 7	Cheung Ying, Hsieh Hung	Cheung Ying, Ng Cho-Fan, Teresa Ha, Leung Suk-Hing, Lai Cheuk-Cheuk	Drama	
Marriage on the Rocks (婚變)	Chow Sze-Luk (周詩祿), aka Chow See-Luk	Yin Pak, Cheung Wood-Yau, Mui Yee	Drama	
Sword of Blood and Valour	Lee Sun-fung	Cho Tat Wah, Sheung-Koon Kwan-Wai, Tsi Law-Lin	Wuxia	
