= List of Maldivian films of 1992 =

This is a list of Maldivian films released in 1992.

== Releases ==
=== Feature film ===
Opening	Title	Director	Studio	Cast
NA	Dhon Manma	Ahmed Sharmeel; Ibrahim Waheed	Star Light	Haajara Abdul Kareem, Ibrahim Shakir, Ahmed Sharmeel, Mariyam Haajara, Lillian Saeed
NA	Loabi Veveynee Furaana Dheegen	Yoosuf Rafeeu	Bukhari Films	Yoosuf Rafeeu, Mariyam Shakeela, Haajara Abdul Kareem, Sithi Fulhu, Hussain Athif
NA	Naseebu	Easa Shareef		Reeko Moosa Manik, Lilian Saeed, Easa Shareef, Aishath Shiranee

=== Television ===
This is a list of Maldivian series, in which the first episode was aired or streamed in 1992.

Opening		Title	Director(s)	Cast	Notes
MAR	11	Floak The International		Zaahir; Ashraf Abdul Raheem	4 Episodes
NA		Salhi Baisaa 2	Mohamed Niyaz	Ahmed Nimal; Ahmed Simau; Ibrahim Khaleel; Hassan Manik; Hassan Haleem; Fathimath Rameeza	3 episodes

== See also ==
- Lists of Maldivian films
