= List of Maldivian films of 2014 =

This is a list of Maldivian films released in 2014.

== Releases ==
=== Theatre releases ===
Opening		Title	Genre	Director	Cast	Ref.
MAR	28	Aniyaa	Family drama	Ahmed Nimal	Mohamed Jumayyil, Niuma Mohamed, Ismail Rasheed, Fathimath Fareela	
MAY	29	Raanee	Drama	Mohamed Aboobakuru	Mohamed Manik, Sheela Najeeb, Fathimath Azifa	
AUG	28	24 Gadi Iru	Suspense Thriller	Yoosuf Shafeeu, Mohamed Rasheed	Yoosuf Shafeeu, Fathimath Azifa, Sara Mayrhuber, Hassan Manik, Ahmed Aman	
SEP	21	Insaana	Psychological thriller	Ali Seezan	Ali Seezan, Aishath Rishmy, Fathimath Fareela, Ahmed Saeed	
OCT	1	Aadheys	Family drama	Abdul Faththaah	Niuma Mohamed, Hussain Sobah, Amira Ismail, Moosa Zakariyya, Fathimath Azifa, Ali Azim	
DEC	25	Hulhudhaan	Drama	Aishath Fuad Thaufeeq	Mariyam Majudha, Roanu Hassan Manik, Ravee Farooq, Ahmed Saeed	
