= Sandhuravirey =

- Official film poster
- Directed by: Amjad Ibrahim
- Written by: Moosa Saaid
- Screenplay by: Amjad Ibrahim
- Produced by: Hassan Ali
- Starring: Yoosuf Shafeeu; Mariyam Nisha
- Cinematography: Ahmed Athoof
- Edited by: Ali Musthafa
- Music by: Mohamed Madheeh
- Production company: Dash Studio
- Release date: June 5, 2002
- Running time: 182 minutes
- Country: Maldives
- Language: Dhivehi

Sandhuravirey is a 2002 Maldivian horror film directed by Amjad Ibrahim. Produced by Hassan Ali under Dash Studio, the film stars Yoosuf Shafeeu and Mariyam Nisha in pivotal roles.

== Premise ==
Dhiyash (Yoosuf Shafeeu), a poor young boy who lives in a hut with his father, meets a beautiful lady, Yaasha (Mariyam Nisha) at the beach. They instantly like each other and starts dating before she reveals herself to be a jinn. Deceived, Dhiyash calls their relationship off and warns her not to meet him ever again. Yaasha, later disguised as a wise woman, Zaleesha (Mariyam Haleem) helped him to learn basic elements needed for opening a business and indirectly assists him in locating and selling an ambergris. Five years later, Dhiyas, now a successful businessman is introduced to a needy family; Naha (Khadheeja Mohamed) and her kid, Lauza, whom later revealed to be Yaasha disguised as another woman where Lauza was discovered to be their own child.

== Cast ==
- Yoosuf Shafeeu as Dhiyash
- Mariyam Nisha as Shafqa / Yaasha
- Khadheeja Mohamed as Naha
- Neena Saleem as Jauza
- Ahmed Moosa as Viaam
- Suneetha Ali as Safa
- Mariyam Haleem as Zaleesha
- Raisa as Lauza

== Soundtrack ==
Track listing
No.	Title	Lyrics	Singer(s)	Length
1.	"Vevey Loabi Kiyaaladheyn"	Ahmed Haleem	Ali Rameez, Shifa Thaufeeq
2.	"Mirey Ishqugaa Kuruvaa"	Ahmed Haleem	Ali Rameez, Shifa Thaufeeq
3.	"Hithuga Loabin Kalaa Ey"	Ahmed Haleem	Ali Rameez, Fathimath Rauf
4.	"Vindhey Thee Hingaa Kiyanhey?"	Ahmed Haleem	Muaviyath Anwar, Shifa Thaufeeq
