= Mariyam Haleem =

Maldivian actress (born 1962)

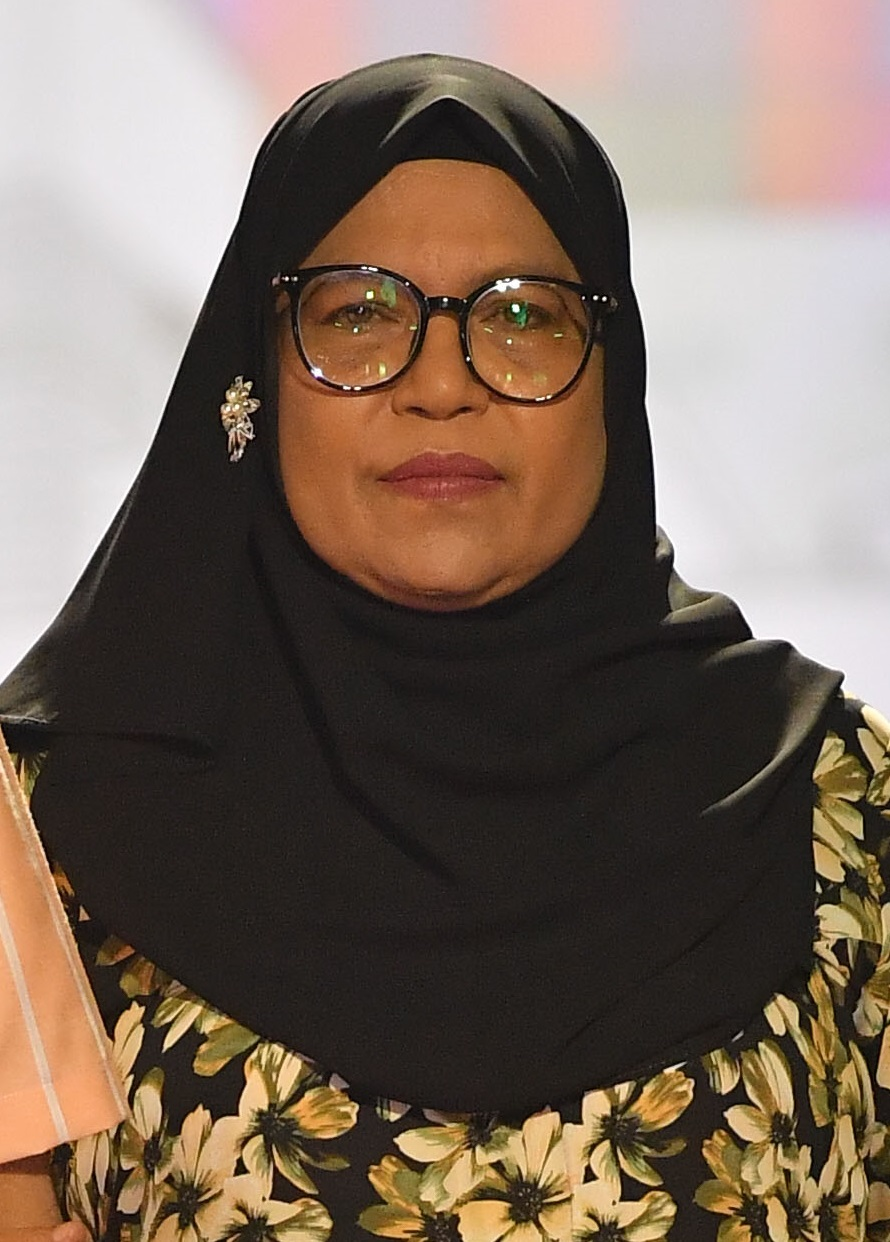
- Haleem attending Olympus reopening ceremony, 2023
- Born: 22 April 1962 (age 64); Male'
- Occupation: Film actress
- Years active: 1997–present
- Spouse: Ali Farooq
- Children: Ravee Farooq; Hamdhan Farooq; Hamdhoon Farooq

Mariyam Haleem (born 22 April 1962) is a Maldivian actress.

== Career ==
=== 1997–2010: Initial releases with small roles ===
Haleem made her film debut in Abdulla Sujau-directed Laila (1997) starring opposite Ali Shameel and Aishath Shiranee as depressed mother whose daughter was snatched off from her at a very young age. The same year, Haleem starred in Mohamed Ali Manik's Maazee (2000) alongside Ismail Wajeeh, Jamsheedha Ahmed, Mariyam Nazima and Aminath Rasheedha which narrates the story of two best friends, a boy and a girl, who get separated at childhood and reunite as adults. Rasheedha played the role of Saeedha, the impecunious mother of Ahmed Imran, portrayed by Ismail Wajeeh, who plays hard to win his childhood friend. Also, she starred opposite Reeko Moosa Manik, Hassan Afeef, Niuma Mohamed and Mariyam Nazima in Easa Shareef-directed Emme Fahu Dhuvas (2000) which follows devious woman who sunders her best-friend's upcoming marriage by creating false accusation and staging misleading impressions.

Amjad Ibrahim-directed Ainbehge Loabi Firiehge Vaajib, starring Haleem, Yoosuf Shafeeu, Jamsheedha Ahmed, Arifa Ibrahim and Niuma Mohamed was released in 2000. The film revolves around a woman who has been mistreated by her step-mother and forced into a marriage she disapproves. Haleem played the role of Hazaar's mother, looking after his son. The same year, she starred opposite Ali Shameel in the Easa Shareef-directed romantic horror film 2000 Vana Ufan Dhuvas (2000), in which she portrays the role of a helpless girlfriend who is betrayed in love. She next starred as a villainous step-mother, in Fathimath Nahula's drama film Naaummeedhu (2000) which depicts the story of a happily married couple whose life is shattered into pieces when they unintentionally invite a seductive woman into their life. The film receiving favorable reviews from critics was able to screen twenty eight houseful shows at Olympus Cinema, making it the highest grossing Maldivian film of the year.

In 2002, she again collaborated with Amjad Ibrahim for two projects; his horror film Sandhuravirey (2002) which narrates the story of a female jinn aiming to win the heart of a human being and his drama film alongside Yoosuf Shafeeu and Sheela Najeeb, Kahvalhah Dhaandhen (2002). Featuring Shafeeu and Mariyam Nisha in lead roles, the former received poor reviews from critics. She was applauded for her performance as the diligent grandmother, in the Abdul Faththaah-directed critically acclaimed television series, Thiyey Mihithuge Vindhakee (2003) which was considered as one of the best series production in television industry. This was followed by Amjad Ibrahim's romantic drama film Hithuge Edhun (2006) which narrates the story of a disabled man. She played the role of Waleedha, a stubborn mother who disowns her daughter when she married a man she dejects.

=== 2011–present: Hahdhu and acclaimed roles ===
In 2011, she starred in Hussain Munawwar's directorial debut romantic drama Sazaa opposite Ismail Rasheed, Niuma Mohamed, Lufshan Shakeeb and Fathimath Azifa. Story of the film revolves around a carefree girl whose life flips upside down once she is forced to marry a brutal man. She played the mother of Reema, a blithe person who is suffering domestic abuse from her husband. She earned mostly positive comments for her performance. Critically well-received, the film emerged as a commercial success.

Two year later, she again collaborated with Hussain Munawwar for his second direction, revenge thriller film Dhilakani (2013) alongside Ismail Rasheed, Mohamed Manik, Mohamed Faisal and Aminath Rishfa. The film deals with a man's tumultuous journey to seek vengeance and the demolition of family bond over a girl. The following year, she was roped in to play the depressive mother in Mohamed Nimal-directed family drama Aniyaa (2014) starring alongside Ismail Rasheed, Niuma Mohamed and Mohamed Jumayyil. The story of the film revolves around a boy who has been deprived of love from his parents. Due to several technical errors and struggle caused during the screening of the film, it failed to garner enough hype ultimately doing average to poor business at boxoffice.

In 2015, Haleem collaborated with Fathimath Nahula for 13 episodes television drama series, Umurah Salaan (2015) which centers on a squabble family which is separated due to the greed for money and misunderstandings. The series which stars Mohamed Faisal, Aminath Rishfa, Ahmed Azmeel and Mariyam Azza in lead roles, she portrays the villainous step-mother who allegedly kills her husband.

Abdul Faththaah's romantic drama Hahdhu (2017) was her next film release, playing the role of a bully. The film touched upon controversial issues in the Maldives including the depiction of flogging and also shines a light on mental health by featuring an attempted suicide. The film opened to mixed reviews from critics though it emerged as one of the highest grossing Maldivian films of the year. Despite mixed reviews for the film, Haleem's character was appreciated by the critics while Aishath Maaha reviewing from Avas wrote: "One of the most enjoyed character for me definitely is the character played by Mariyam Haleem. Her performance is "raw and natural" and shines in the film like a diamond".

2018 was a dull year for Maldivian film-industry with regards to 2018 Maldivian presidential election, though she had three film releases during the year. Her first film was a suspense thriller film Dhevansoora (2018) written and directed by Yoosuf Shafeeu. The film marks Shafeeu's thirtieth direction and features an ensemble cast of twenty-one actors. Revolving around a murder investigating, she played the mother grieving for her lost child. The film received positive reviews from critics and was considered a "norm-breaker" for the Maldivian cinema. Ahmed Hameed Adam reviewing from VNews applauded Haleem's performance although she had a small role in terms of screen time. She then starred in the first Maldivian web-series, a romantic drama by Fathimath Nahula, Huvaa. The series consisting of sixty episodes and streamed through the digital platform Baiskoafu, centers around a happy and radiant family which breaks into despairing pieces after a tragic incident that led to an unaccountable loss. The series and her performance as a helpless mother, seeking the love of her lost son were positively received.

Haleem's first release of 2019 was the Moomin Fuad-directed psychological horror thriller Nivairoalhi (2019) which marks Niuma Mohamed's last onscreen film. Revolving around a patient suffering from depression, she played the mother of Haidhar, a religious extremist. Starring opposite Mohamed, Yoosuf Shafeeu and Ahmed Asim, the film received majorly positive reviews from critics; Aishath Maaha of Dho? favored the performance of the lead actors and mentioned the "neat arrangement" of its screenplay though pointed out its "weak ending" to be unsatisfactory while her performance was noted to be "great as usual".

== Filmography ==
=== Feature film ===
| Year | Title | Role | Notes | Ref(s) |
|---|---|---|---|---|
| 1997 | Laila | Waheedha | | |
| 1998 | Ethoofaaneerey | Nifasha's mother | | |
| 2000 | Maazee | Saeedha | | |
| 2000 | Ainbehge Loabi Firiehge Vaajib | Hazaar's mother | | |
| 2000 | 2000 Vana Ufan Dhuvas | Zubeidha | | |
| 2000 | Emme Fahu Dhuvas | Khadheeja | | |
| 2001 | Ranmuiy | Azheem's mother | | |
| 2001 | Naaummeedhu | Noora's step-mother | | |
| 2002 | Sandhuravirey | Zaleesha | | |
| 2002 | Kahvalhah Dhaandhen | Viaam's mother | | |
| 2004 | Dharinnahtakai | Hawwa | | |
| 2006 | Hithuge Edhun | Waleedha | | |
| 2010 | Dhin Veynuge Hithaamaigaa | Herself | Special appearance in the song "Annaashey Hinithun Velamaa" | |
| 2011 | Sazaa | Reema's mother | | |
| 2011 | E Bappa | Mariyam | Special appearance | |
| 2011 | Laelaa | Laelaa's mother | | |
| 2013 | Fathis Handhuvaruge Feshun 3D | Bodudaitha | | |
| 2013 | Dhilakani | Faathuma | | |
| 2014 | Aniyaa | Nazeeha | | |
| 2016 | 4426 | Ruby's mother | | |
| 2017 | Hahdhu | Dhaleyka | | |
| 2018 | Dhevansoora | Arifa | | |
| 2019 | Nivairoalhi | Hardy's mother | | |
| 2019 | Leena | Leena's mother | | |
| 2024 | Udhabaani 2 | | | |
| 2024 | Bibii | Bishara Ali | | |
| 2024 | Gellunu Rey | | | |
| 2025 | Lily | Sanfa | | |
| 2026 | Majunoon | Laana's mother | Special appearance | |

=== Television ===
| Year | Title | Role | Notes | Ref(s) |
|---|---|---|---|---|
| 1998–1999 | Aisha | Faathuma | Recurring role | |
| 1999–2000 | Maafkuraashey | Mariyam | Main role; 10 episodes | |
| 2003–2004 | Thiyey Mihithuge Vindhakee | Dhaleyka | Recurring role; 10 episodes | |
| 2004 | Kamana Vareh Neiy | Hussain | Recurring role; 2 episodes | |
| 2011 | Hiyy Vanee Inthizaarugai | Naseema | | |
| 2011 | Furaana Dheynan | Aneesa | Guest role; "Episode 3" | |
| 2012–2013 | Adhives Eloaibah Gadharu Kuran | Fazeela's step-mother | Recurring role | |
| 2013 | Vaudhey Mee | Qasim | Recurring role; 5 episodes | |
| 2015–2016 | Umurah Salaan | Ashraf's step-mother | Main role; 13 episodes | |
| 2019 | Huvaa | Khadheeja | Main role | |
| 2019 | Shhh | Lucian's mother | 2 episodes | |
| 2019–2021 | Aharenves Loabivey | Thahumeena | Main role; 12 episodes | |
| 2018–2020 | Ehenas | Sobira | Recurring role | |
| 2019–2020 | Maayoos | Hareera | Main role; 13 episodes | |
| 2019–2020 | Haasaa | Abidha | Recurring role; 8 episodes | |
| 2022 | Giritee Loabi | Zubeydha | Guest role; "Episode 22" | |
| 2022 | Vihaali | Ameena | Main role in the segment "Lift Golhi" | |
| 2022 | Bridge | Abidha | Recurring role; 10 episodes | |
| 2022 | Biruveri Vaahaka | Rocky's grandmother | Main role; Episode "Mas Dhathuru" | |
| 2022 | Rimsha | Rimsha's mother | Recurring role; 2 episodes | |
| 2022 | Yasna | Shameena | Main role; 15 episodes | |
| 2022 | Gudhan | Zarana's mother | Guest role; "Episode 1" | |
| 2022 | Dark Rain Chronicles | Ahmed's mother | Main role in the segment "Assalaam Alaikum" | |
| 2023–2024 | Yaaraa | Ruqiyya | Recurring role; 11 episodes | |
| 2023 | Gareena | Fareedha | Recurring role | |
| 2023 | Girlfriends | Sobira | Guest role; Episode: "Click Click Click" | |
| 2025 | Hinthaa | Shirumeena | Recurring role; 5 episodes | |
| 2025 | Roaleemay | Bodey | Recurring role; 8 episodes | |
| 2025 | Moosun | Dhona/Ziyana | Main role; 10 episodes | |
| 2026 | Ekaniveri Hithakun... | Marihtha | Recurring role | |

=== Short film ===
| Year | Title | Role | Notes | Ref(s) |
|---|---|---|---|---|
| 2005 | Falhi Sikunthu 2 | Athika's mother | | |
| 2006 | Mohamma Kalo V/S Bao Kalo | Herself | Special appearance | |
| 2007 | Neena | Neena's mother | | |
| 2009 | Beyinsaafu | Sharafiyya | | |
| 2009 | Santhi Mariyanbu 3 | Santhi Mariyanbu | | |
| 2010 | Dhekafi | Rishfa's mother | Special appearance | |
| 2010 | Nu Ufan Dhari | Nasiha's mother | | |
| 2012 | Dheke Dhekeves 6 | Muhamma's mother | | |
| 2013 | Farihibe 4 | Abidha's step-mother | | |
| 2020 | Thadhu | Ahmed's mother | | |
