= List of Maldivian films of 2016 =

This is a list of Maldivian films released in 2016.

== Releases ==
=== Theatrical releases ===
Opening		Title	Genre	Director	Cast	Ref.
FEB	4	E Re'ah Fahu	Horror/romance	Ahmed Nimal	Ali Seezan, Ahmed Nimal, Fathimath Muslima, Sujeetha Abdulla	
MAR	4	Neyngi Yaaru Vakivee	Romance/drama	Hussain Munawwar	Aminath Rishfa, Ahmed Nimal, Ahmed Azmeel, Maleeha Waheed, Ismail Jumaih	
APR	5	Vaashey Mashaa Ekee	Romance/comedy	Ali Shifau	Mohamed Jumayyil, Mariyam Majudha, Ali Shazleem, Aminath Noora	
MAY	10	Vafaatheri Kehiveriya	Romance	Ali Seezan	Ali Seezan, Maleeha Waheed, Zeenath Abbas, Ahmed Saeed	
JUL	16	Haadharu	Action/thriller	Ashar Waheed	Mohamed Shahum, Shaiga Hussain, Shabana Mohamed, Mohamed Saeed, Faseeh Mohamed	
OCT	18	4426	Horror/romance	Fathimath Nahula; Ahmed Sinan	Mariyam Azza, Yoosuf Shafeeu, Ismail Jumaih, Sheela Najeeb, Mohamed Jumayyil	
NOV	30	Vee Beyvafa	Drama	Ibrahim Wisan	Niuma Mohamed, Yoosuf Shafeeu, Fathimath Fareela, Zeenath Abbas, Abdulla Muaz	
DEC	14	Baiveriyaa	Comedy/drama	Yoosuf Shafeeu	Sheela Najeeb, Yoosuf Shafeeu, Ahmed Azmeel, Maleeha Waheed, Ahmed Saeed	
