= Koyya Hassan Manik =

Maldivian film actor and producer (1953–2021)

- Born: April 25, 1953
- Died: February 20, 2021 (aged 67); Malé, Maldives
- Occupations: Actor, producer
- Years active: 1989–2017
- Children: 5

Hassan Ali Manik professionally known as Koyya Hassan Manik (25 April 1953 – 20 February 2021) was a Maldivian film actor and producer.

== Career ==
=== 1989–2008: Early releases and first lead role with Ajaaib ===
In 1989, Najuma offered him to feature in Hama Mihaaru, one of the programs aired in the Dhivehi Rajjeyge Adu, where he took part in a total of eighteen episodes in a span of three years. During this period, a friend proffered him to star in the television comedy show; Bakhabaru alongside Fibo Ahmed Manik and continued to star in the show as part of the main cast.

The Mohamed Hilmy and Ali Waheed directed film, Ihsaas was released in 1993 in which Manik starred as a guardian to an orphan boy who is being psychologically disturbed following a false arrest. This was followed by his collaboration with Yoosuf Rafeeu for his tragedy drama film Vaudhu which follows the separation of a happy couple due to the societal differences. Afterwards, he played the role of a dedicated brother who discovers the immoral relationship of his niece with one of her teachers, in Amjad Ibrahim's debut direction Huras (1996). The film was developed solely with the intention of winning Gaumee Film Awards though it failed to garner any award at the 2nd Gaumee Film Awards ceremony.

In 2000, he played the father of Fayaz, an ignorant husband who is deeply in love with a patient suffering from congenital heart disease in Abdul Faththaah's television drama series Dhoapatta. Starring alongside Niuma Mohamed, Sheela Najeeb and Jamsheedha Ahmed, the series centers on unrequited love and complications of a relationship within and beyond marriage. The same year, he starred opposite Hussain Sobah, Jamsheedha Ahmed and Mariyam Nisha in Fathimath Nahula's debut direction Fahuneyvaa (1998) which portrays the love-conflict of a man between a prominent stage performer and a deaf-mute poor girl. In the film, he played the role of Zubair Ali, father of a second wife who discovers her husband's secret marriage. The film was critically appreciated by critics and was a commercial success. This was followed by the Ali Musthafa-directed Umurah (1999) opposite Jamsheedha Ahmed and Reeko Moosa Manik.

In 2000, Manik featured alongside Ahmed Asim, Mariyam Nazima and Waleedha Waleed in the Haajara Abdul Kareem-directed Ajaaib which marks the first film in which Manik plays the lead role. The film depicts the relationship of two exemplary wives and their respective families regardless of societal norms. He then played a supporting role in a film directed by Ali Waheed, Kulunu starring Ismail Wajeeh and Aishath Shiranee, in which Manik was featured as an advisor to a conflicted father who arranges the marriage of his only daughter to an already committed man. The same year he played the role of an unbearable and confused step-father in Abdul Faththaah's directorial debut, Himeyn Dhuniye which received positive reviews from critics.

The following year, he starred alongside Yoosuf Shafeeu, Sheela Najeeb, Jamsheedha Ahmed, Mohamed Shavin and Ibrahim Giyas in the Amjad Ibrahim-directed Aaah (2001) which revolves around two siblings involved in family business and the downfall of the younger brother's love life when he discovers his fiancé is already married to an abusive husband. This was followed by Fathimath Nahula's drama film Naaummeedhu (2000) which depicts the story of a happily married couple whose life is shattered into pieces when they unintentionally invite a seductive woman into their life. The film received favourable reviews from critics and emerged as the highest grossing Maldivian film of the year.

Manik collaborated with Easa Shareef for the horror film Ginihila (2003) alongside Ali Seezan, Niuma Mohamed, Mariyam Nisha and Reeko Moosa Manik, playing the role of Ibrahim Rafeeu, father of a mentally unstable young girl who commits suicide when her boyfriend rebuked her demand to leave his wife for her. The film narrates the story of a young couple who decide to spend a romantic break to save their crumbling marriage and how events take a sinister turn when the wife experiences supernatural incidents involving her husband. The film is an unofficial remake of Vikram Bhatt's Indian horror film Raaz (2002) featuring Bipasha Basu, Dino Morea, Malini Sharma and Ashutosh Rana which itself is an unofficial adaptation of What Lies Beneath.

Manik received critical acclaim for his "authentic" performance as a pervert in Abdul Faththaah's critically praised romantic film Vehey Vaarey Therein (2003). Featuring Jamsheedha Ahmed, Khadheeja Ibrahim Didi, Mohamed Shavin, Amira Ismail and Aminath Rasheedha in pivotal roles, the film narrates the story of unrequited love, and proved to be one of the highest-grossing Maldivian films of the year. Moomin Fuad and Ali Shifau's critically appreciated crime film Heylaa (2006) featured Manik in a small role as a concerned citizen. The film narrates the story of a fourteen year old ambitious boy who finds himself unknowingly being involved in the smuggling of a revolver. It was the first Maldivian film to be shot in high-definition digital video. Though the film received positive reviews from critics, it was a commercial failure. Co-director of the film Shifau opined that its commercial status was a result of casting "not very prominent" faces in the film and the "film-goers were not ready to accept the genre" at the time of release. His next release, Ahmed Nimal's romantic film Vaaloabi Engeynama (2006), starred alongside Yoosuf Shafeeu, Mariyam Afeefa, Fathimath Fareela and Fauziyya Hassan was a critical and commercial success, considered to be the most successful Maldivian release of the year.

=== 2009–2017: E Bappa and further releases ===
In 2009, Manik starred alongside Niuma Mohamed, Ali Seezan and Nadhiya Hassan as a supportive father-in-law of a secure first wife in Seezan's melodrama Karuna Vee Beyvafa (2009). The film follows a downfall of a happily married couple on realizing the wife's infertility and destruction of their relationship with the invasion of a second wife. Manik's first release of 2010 was the Ali Seezan-directed family drama Maafeh Neiy, another collaboration with Seezan and Niuma Mohamed. The film highlights many social issues including human rights abuses, forced marriages and domestic violence. He played the role of Naseer, a wealthy businessman who abuses his wife. The film received mixed reviews from critics, but was a moderate success at box office. Later in 2010, Manik appeared in a small role in Yoosuf Shafeeu's Veeraana which deals with child sexual abuse. The film received mixed to positive reviews from critics; praising the writer and director for touching a condemnatory topic though criticing its "over-the-top melodrama". Having a strong buzz prior its release, the film proved to be a commercial success. The last release of the year featured Manik in the drama film Heyonuvaane (2010) which was directed by Yoosuf Shafeeu and starring opposite Shafeeu, Sheela Najeeb and Fathimath Fareela. The story revolves around a male who is a victim of domestic abuse. Even though the film mainly received negative reviews from critics, it emerged as the second highest grossing Maldivian release of the year.

The following year, he appeared in the family drama E Bappa (2011) which was produced by himself, featuring an ensemble cast including Yoosuf Shafeeu, Mohamed Manik, Sheela Najeeb, Amira Ismail, Lufshan Shakeeb, Mariyam Shakeela and Fathimath Fareela. A film about fatherhood and how he has been treated by his family, received negative reviews for its "typical stereotype style" and was a box office failure. He next worked with Hamid Ali for his Laelaa (2011) starring Yoosuf Shafeeu, Amira Ismail, Ahmed Easa and Hamid Ali. The film revolves around two daughters who were forced into arranged marriages by their parent. The film and his performance received negative reviews from critics and was declared a flop at the box office.

In 2015, Manik appeared in two films released by Dark Rain Entertainment. The first film was Ali Shifau-directed romantic film Emme Fahu Vindha Jehendhen, alongside Mohamed Jumayyil and Mariyam Majudha. The film narrating the struggle and challenges a happily married couple undergo, was the highest grossing Maldivian film of the year, and was a critical success. Manik was next seen in the Ravee Farooq-directed film Mikoe Bappa Baey Baey (2015) opposite Aishath Rishmy and Mohamed Manik. The film follows a mother who is ready to do anything in her power to protect her child from any harm of adversity from a man who becomes afflicted with "Post Traumatic Amnesia". It was one of the three entries from the Maldives to the SAARC Film Festival 2016.

== Death ==
On 20 February 2021, it was confirmed that Manik died from COVID-19 early that morning, while undergoing treatment at the Dharumavatha Hospital in Male’ for nine days.

== Filmography ==
=== Feature film ===
Year	Title	Role	Notes	Ref(s)
—N/a	Loabi Vevidhaane			
1993	Imthihaan	Haidharu		
1993	Ihsaas	Aadhanu		
1993	Vaudhu	Abdul Ghafoor		
1994	Dheriyaa	Solih		
1994	Kulunu	Hassan		
1996	Huras	Adam Manik		
1998	Fahuneyvaa	Zubair Ali		
1999	Umurah	Hameed		
2000	Ajaaib	Aadhanu		
2000	Himeyn Dhuniye	Shamil's step-father	Special appearance	
2001	Aaah	Thaufeeq		
2001	Naaummeedhu	Mahir		
2003	Ginihila	Ibrahim Rafeeu		
2003	Vehey Vaarey Therein	Asim		
2006	Heylaa	Mufeed		
2006	Vaaloabi Engeynama	Abdul Rasheed		
2009	Karuna Vee Beyvafa	Ibrahim Mohamed		
2010	Maafeh Neiy	Naseer		
2010	Veeraana	Shahin's boss	Special appearance	
2010	Heyonuvaane	Hamid		
2011	E Bappa	Hassan	Also the producer	
2011	Laelaa	Hassan Manik		
2015	Emme Fahu Vindha Jehendhen	Cheque drawer	Special appearance	
2015	Mikoe Bappa Baey Baey	Bodube		
2017	Bos	Raaidh's father		

=== Television ===
Year	Title	Role	Notes	Ref(s)
1993	Dhanmalhi	Hussainfulhu	Teledrama	
1993	Gundolhi			
1993	Zaizafoonaa	Raaidh		
1994	Furusathu	Shameel		
1994	Dhanthura	Aishath's father		
1999	Aisha	Naseem's father	Recurring role	
1999–2000	Maafkuraashey	Hassan	Main role; 10 episodes	
2000	Dhoapatta	Adam	Recurring role	
2000	Reysham	Magistrate	Guest role; "Episode 4"	
2002	Fahu Fiyavalhu	Ramiz Abdul Satthar	Main role; 5 episodes	
2003	Dheewanaa Hiyy	Naseer	Main role; 5 episodes	
2003	Edhuvas En'buri Annaanenama	Ina's father	Main role; 5 episodes	
2004	Kamana Vareh Neiy	Hashim	Main role; 4 episodes	
2004–2005	Loabi Nulibunas	Dheena's father	Recurring role; 4 episodes	
2006–2008	Hinithun Velaashey Kalaa	Samad	Main role; 10 episodes	
2009	Mohamma Gaadiyaa	Adambe	Recurring role; 4 episodes	
2011	Hiyy Vanee Inthizaarugai	Moosa		

=== Short film ===
Year	Title	Role	Notes	Ref(s)
2009	Bulhaa Dhombe	Mudhinbe		
2010	Nu Ufan Dhari	Sorcerer		
