= Mohamed Shavin =

Maldivian film actor

Mohamed Shavin is a Maldivian film actor.

== Career ==
In 2000, he played the role of Fayaz, an ignorant husband who is deeply in love with a patient suffering from congenital heart disease in Abdul Faththaah's television drama series Dhoapatta. Starring alongside Niuma Mohamed, Sheela Najeeb and Jamsheedha Ahmed, the series centers on unrequited love and complications of a relationship within and beyond marriage.

Shavin had three releases in 2001. In his first release, he starred alongside Yoosuf Shafeeu, Sheela Najeeb, Jamsheedha Ahmed and Ibrahim Giyas in Amjad Ibrahim-directed Aaah (2001) which revolves around two siblings involved in family business and the downfall of the younger brother's love life when he discovers his fiancé is already married to an abusive husband. It was followed by Ali Shameel's drama film Hithi Nimun (2001) featuring opposite Mariyam Nisha and Sheereen Abdul Wahid, which follows the storyline of a stubborn young man (played by Shavin) who abandons his girlfriend when he discovers about her pregnancy. In his third and final film of the year, Shavin starred an aspiring photographer working for a magazine in Aslam Rasheed's romantic thriller film Dheevaanaa which was an unofficial remake of Ram Gopal Varma's romantic thriller Pyaar Tune Kya Kiya (2001) starring Urmila Matondkar, Fardeen Khan and Sonali Kulkarni. The film narrates the story of a woman who falls in love with an already married photographer and sets out to get what she wants, no matter what the consequences may be. The following year, he collaborated with Amjad Ibrahim for his drama film Kahvalhah Dhaandhen (2002), co-starring Sheela Najeeb,.

Shavin next featured in Amjad Ibrahim's next directorial venture Sandhuravirey 2 (2004); a sequel to his 2002 horror film Sandhuravirey which presented Yoosuf Shafeeu and Mariyam Nisha in lead roles. Starring additional cast including Zeenath Abbas, Niuma Mohamed and Sheereen Abdul Wahid, the film follows a storyline of a daughter jinn avenging the death of its mother and sister on Dhiyash's family. Similar to its prequel, the film received negative response from critics. He next appeared in Yoosuf Shafeeu-directed horror film Edhathuru (2004) as one of the eight friends who go on a picnic to an island and how they fight to survive the horrific incidents that befall them. The film was appreciated by critics, specifically praising its sound effect and was a commercial success.

Shavin received his first Gaumee Film Award nomination as the Best Supporting Actor for his "authentic" performance as the sacrificing boyfriend in Abdul Faththaah's critically praised romantic film Vehey Vaarey Therein (2003). Featuring Yoosuf Shafeeu, Khadheeja Ibrahim Didi, Jamsheedha Ahmed, Amira Ismail and Aminath Rasheedha in crucial roles, the film narrates the story of unrequited love, and proved to be one of the highest-grossing Maldivian films of the year. This was followed by Amjad Ibrahim's romantic drama film Hithuge Edhun (2006) which narrates the story of a disabled man. He played the role of Nahid, a committed husband who was unaware of his wife's affair.

== Filmography ==
=== Feature film ===
Year	Title	Role	Notes	Ref(s)
2000	Shaalinee	Shavin	Dubbed by Ibrahim Wisan	
2001	Aaah	Faisal		
2001	Hithi Nimun	Junaid Ahmed		
2001	Dheevaanaa	Zain		
2002	Kahvalhah Dhaandhen	Zahid		
2003	Vehey Vaarey Therein	Mohamed Ziyan	Nominated—Gaumee Film Award for Best Supporting Actor	
2004	Sandhuravirey 2	Ayaz		
2004	Edhathuru	Dhaain		
2006	Hithuge Edhun	Nahid		
2010	Dhin Veynuge Hithaamaigaa	Himself	Special appearance in the song "Annaashey Hinithun Velamaa"	
2010	Mi Hiyy Keekkuraanee?	Shahid		

=== Television ===
Year	Title	Role	Notes	Ref(s)
2000	Dhoapatta	Fayaz Adam	Main role; 5 episodes	
2003	Ruheveynee Kon Hithakun?		Teledrama	
2003	Raiy Finifenmaa		Main role	
2004	Vaisoori	Anas	In the segment "An'dhiri Hayaaiy"	
2004	Kamana Vareh Neiy	Mahil	Main role; 5 episodes	

=== Short film ===
Year	Title	Role	Notes	Ref(s)
2001	Santhi Mariyanbu 1	Jaadhoogar	Children's Short film	
2001	Safaru Kaiydha 1		Children's Short film	
2008	Guest House Room Number:201	Viyaam		
2010	Dhekafi	Zahid	Also the director	
2010	Nu Ufan Dhari	Jinn		

== Accolades ==
Year	Award	Category	Nominated work	Result	Ref(s)
2008	4th Gaumee Film Awards	Best Supporting Actor	Vehey Vaarey Therein	Nominated	
