= Jamsheedha Ahmed =

Maldivian actress

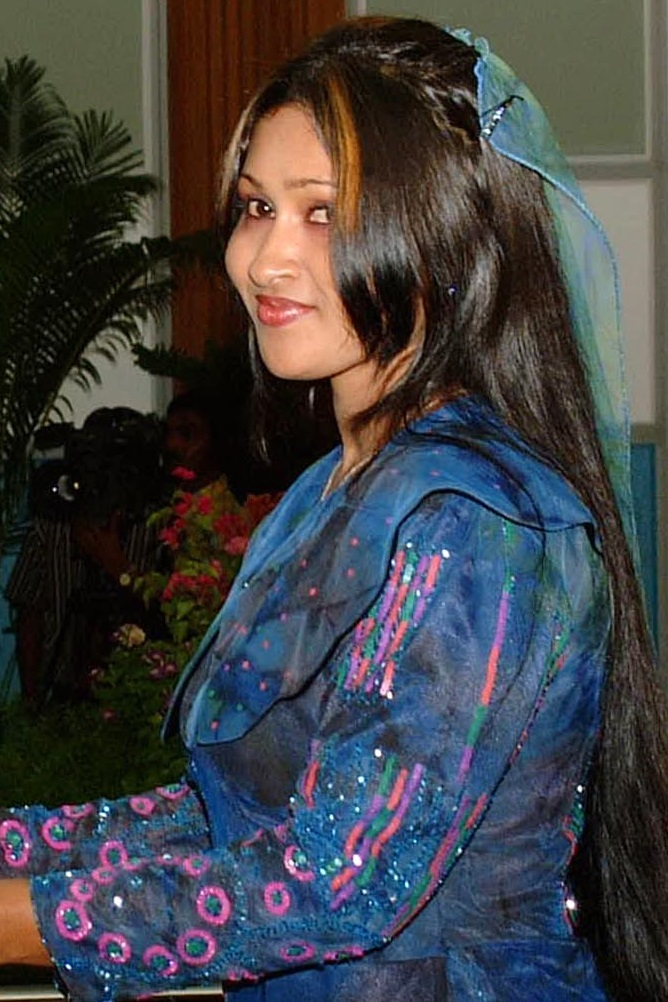
- Ahmed receiving the National Award of Recognition, 2004
- Born: 2 December 1978 (age 47); Gn. Fuvahmulah, Maldives
- Occupation: Actress
- Years active: 1996–2005
- Spouse: Ibrahim Bushry
- Children: 4

Jamsheedha Ahmed (2 December 1978) is a Maldivian actress.

== Career ==
=== 1996–99: Early releases and Amaanaaiy ===
Ahmed made her screen debut in 1996 with the video single titled "Nudhaashe Dhookohfaa Loabivaa" performed by Abdul Sameeu. Recalling her memories of the song, Ahmed said it was a "fun experience" accepted as a favor to her friend. With her "timid" behavior and lack of trainings, Ahmed "struggled" while performing the song. However, upon release, the song was accepted among the audience where she received several offers to feature in songs and film. A year later, she made her film debut alongside Mariyam Nisha and Hussain Sobah as the caring sister of an underprivileged talented vocalist in Amjad Ibrahim's Loabeege Aniyaa (1997). She next starred in Mohamed Ali Manik's Maazee (2000) alongside Ismail Wajeeh, Mariyam Nazima and Aminath Rasheedha which narrates the story of two best friends, a boy and a girl, who get separated at childhood and reunite as adults. Ahmed played the role of Neeza, a high self-esteemed girl who disregards her own mother and childhood best friend. The film marks Jamsheedha's only collaboration in a film with actor Ismail Wajeeh.

In 1998, Ahmed starred in Mahdi Ahmed's Amaanaaiy alongside Ali Khalid and Fathimath Rameeza. The film revolves around a man who is welcomed with his illegitimate son after the child's mother's death and the events that proceed when his wife is not fond of the child. It is based on Shekhar Kapur's Indian drama film Masoom (1983) which is a remake of the 1982 Malayalam movie Olangal, which are both adaptations of Man, Woman and Child, 1980 novel by Erich Segal. However, the film majorly focuses on the character of Ashiya – played by Ahmed – whose role has been derived as of Supriya Pathak's in Mausoom who only features for around five minutes. It served as a major breakthrough role for her; and was both critically and commercially appreciated. At 3rd Gaumee Film Awards, she was bestowed with Best Actress award.

She played the role of Nasiha, an attractive young woman in a relationship with a married man and a patient suffering from congenital heart disease in Abdul Faththaah's television drama series Dhoapatta (2000). Starring alongside Mohamed Shavin, Sheela Najeeb and Niuma Mohamed, the series centers on unrequited love and complications of a relationship within and beyond marriage. She was also signed to play an insecure second wife opposite Reeko Moosa Manik in Hussain Adhil-directed Sirru. She next starred opposite Hussain Sobah and Mariyam Nisha in Fathimath Nahula's debut direction Fahuneyvaa (1998) which portrays the love-conflict of a man between a prominent stage performer and a deaf-mute poor girl. Ahmed played the role of Haifa, a celebrated vocalist and the second wife who discovers her husband's secret marriage. The film was critically appreciated by critics and was a commercial hit. This was followed by the Ali Musthafa-directed Umurah (1999) opposite Reeko Moosa Manik. Her collaboration with Faththaah was repeated the same year with another romantic drama series, Aisha where she played the titular role of a young woman suffering from an abusive marriage.

=== 2000–05: Vehey Vaarey Therein and career end ===
Amjad Ibrahim-directed Ainbehge Loabi Firiehge Vaajib, starring Ahmed, Yoosuf Shafeeu, Arifa Ibrahim and Niuma Mohamed was released in 2000. The film revolves around a woman, Julia (played by Ahmed) who has been mistreated by her step-mother and forced into a marriage she disapproves. The same year, she starred opposite Reeko Moosa Manik and Ali Seezan in the Easa Shareef-directed romantic horror film 2000 Vana Ufan Dhuvas (2000), in which she portrays a double role, Sudha, a fraud who is having an affair with a married husband and desperately fulfills all her desires by blood and sweat, and Shiuna, a helpless young woman who is forced to act as twin to the former.

Ahmed starred as Noora, the ungrateful and wicked friend in Fathimath Nahula's drama film Naaummeedhu (2000) which depicts the story of a happily married couple whose life is shattered into pieces when they unintentionally invite a seductive woman into their life. The film receiving favorable reviews from critics was able to screen twenty eight houseful shows at Olympus Cinema, making it the highest grossing Maldivian film of the year. She next starred alongside Sheela Najeeb, Yoosuf Shafeeu, Mohamed Shavin and Ibrahim Giyas in Amjad Ibrahim-directed Aaah (2001) which revolves around two siblings involved in family business and the downfall of the younger brother's love life when he discovers his fiance is already married to an abusive husband.

Ahmed received her second Gaumee Film Award nomination as the Best Actress for her "authentic" performance as the loyal and depressive wife who discovers her husband's extramarital affair with his ex-lover in Abdul Fatthah's critically praised romantic film Vehey Vaarey Therein (2003). Featuring Yoosuf Shafeeu, Khadheeja Ibrahim Didi, Mohamed Shavin, Amira Ismail and Aminath Rasheedha in crucial roles, the film narrates the story of unrequited love, and proved to be one of the highest-grossing Maldivian films of the year. After the birth of her second daughter, Ahmed slowly drifted away from the industry though she played few roles and songs. She then collaborated with Fathimath Nahula for her critically and commercially successful romantic drama television series, Kalaage Haqqugaa, to portray the role of Nuzu, a depressive wife mourning over her dead husband. Ahmed officially concluded her career after relocating to Sri Lanka. Her role in the film was replaced by Sheela Najeeb after the seventh episode.

== Personal life ==
After moving to Sri Lanka, Ahmed commenced a business entrepreneurship named "Nutria Food" with her husband, Ibrahim Bushry, (famously known as the previous owner of Cactus Maldives) where they supply foods and vegetables to resorts. Initially started in their house, the business was expanded once they migrated to Malaysia where they opened a factory to run the business. According to Ahmed, her prime focus remains aligned to her husband, their four children and their business.

== Filmography ==
=== Feature film ===
Year	Title	Role	Notes	Ref(s)
1997	Hinithun	Areesha		
1997	Loabeega Aniyaa	Mariyam		
1997	Dhefirin	Aishath "Shehenaz" Ali		
1998	Fahuneyvaa	Aishath Haifa		
1998	Sirru	Jeeza		
1998	Amaanaaiy	Ashiya	Gaumee Film Award for Best Actress	
1999	Farudhaa			
1999	Umurah	Jamsheedha		
2000	Maazee	Neeza		
2000	2000 Vana Ufan Dhuvas	Sudha / Shiuna / Reema		
2000	Ainbehge Loabi Firiehge Vaajib	Julia		
2001	Aaah	Aisha		
2001	Naaummeedhu	Noora		
2003	Vehey Vaarey Therein	Liusha	Nominated—Gaumee Film Award for Best Actress	

=== Television ===
Year	Title	Role	Notes	Ref(s)
1998	Kulheybeybe		Main role; 5 episode	
1998	Un'hoo Thakuraa	Zahira	Main role; 1 episode	
1998–1999	Aisha	Aisha	Main role; 10 episodes	
2000	Dhoapatta	Nasiha	Main role; 5 episodes	
2003	Edhuvas En'buri Annaanenama	Ina	Main role; 5 episode	
2004	Loabi Loabi Dharifulhaa		Main role; 1 episode	
2005	Kalaage Haqqugaa	Nuzu	Main role; 7 episodes	

== Accolades ==
Year	Award	Category	Nominated work	Result	Ref(s)
1999	Aafathis Awards – 1998	Best Actress	Amaanaaiy	Won	
2004	National Award of Recognition	Performing Arts - Acting		Won	
2007	3rd Gaumee Film Awards	Best Actress	Amaanaaiy	Won	
2007	4th Gaumee Film Awards	Best Actress	Vehey Vaarey Therein	Nominated	
