= Amjad Ibrahim =

Maldivian film director and screenwriter

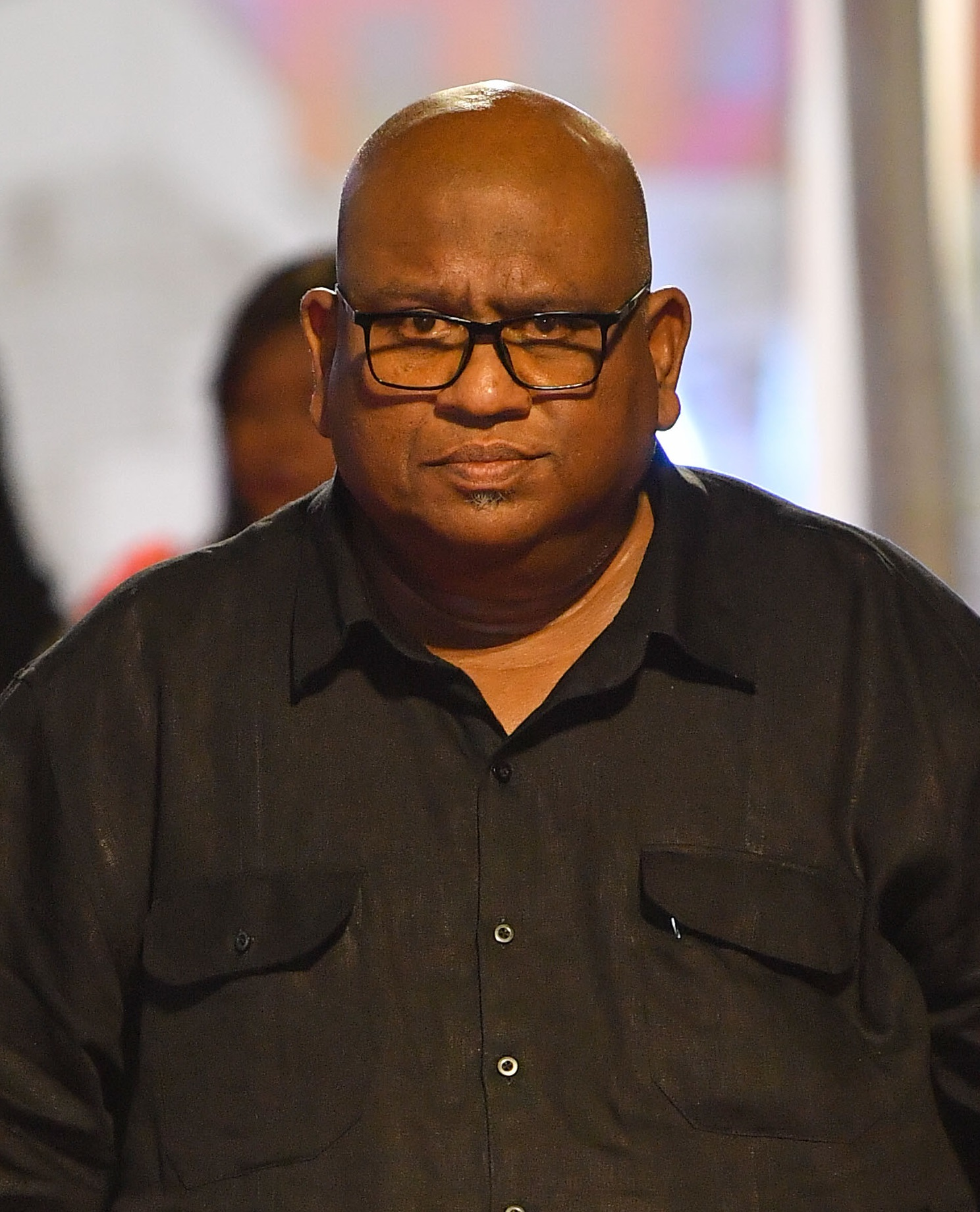
- Ibrahim attending Olympus reopening ceremony, 2023
- Born: 11 September 1967 (age 58); Male', Maldives
- Occupations: director, screenwriter
- Years active: 1995–present

Amjad Ibrahim Didi (born 11 September 1967), commonly known as Amjad Ibrahim, is a Maldivian film director and screenwriter.

== Early life ==
After completing eleven years of service in Maldives National Defence Force, Ibrahim decided to pursue a career in film direction due to his "fondness" towards film-making process. His first work as a director was Naifaru Dhohokko's video single "Maslahathu Neiy An'binney", followed by directing six songs for the television program, Maazeege Handhaan. His first television drama, Maaburuge Usoolu was released in 1995 produced by the Maldives National Defence Force.

== Career ==
Amjad Ibrahim wrote and released his debut-direction, a drama film Huras in 1996, which features Hassan Afeef, Mariyam Rasheedha, Vazuna Ahmed, Koyya Hassan Manik and Arifa Ibrahim in pivotal roles. The film which focuses on an immoral relationship between a teacher and a student was developed solely with the intention of winning Gaumee Film Awards though it failed to garner any award at 2nd Gaumee Film Awards ceremony. The following year, he released the commercially successful romantic drama film Loabeega Aniyaa (1997) which appears Mariyam Nisha, an established actress her career for an underprivileged talented vocalist (Hussain Sobah). The film launched Jamsheedha Ahmed as an actress and Ibrahim considers it as one of his "biggest accomplishments" he has achieved in the industry. The next year, Ibrahim made his screen debut in Hamid Ali's drama film Mila Handhuvaru (1998), starred as the grandfather of Mariyam (Mariyam Nisha), a pampered child of a family trapped in a lie.

Ibrahim next launched actor Yoosuf Shafeeu with his comedy drama film Qurbaani (2000) featuring Shafeeu, Mariyam Nisha and Hussain Sobah. The film was a financially successful project and was declared a Mega-Hit at the end of its run at cinema. Post Shafeeu's debut, Ibrahim roped him in several other projects he worked in. The same year, he released Ainbehge Loabi Firiehge Vaajib (2000) starring Yoosuf Shafeeu, Jamsheedha Ahmed, Arifa Ibrahim and Niuma Mohamed. The film revolves around a woman who has been mistreated by her step-mother and forced into a marriage she disapproves.

In 2001, Ibrahim directed Aaah starring Shafeeu, Sheela Najeeb, Jamsheedha Ahmed, Mohamed Shavin and Ibrahim Giyas which revolves around two siblings involved in family business and the downfall of the younger brother's love life when he discovers his fiancé is already married to an abusive husband. The following year, he released two films; a horror film Sandhuravirey (2002) which narrates the story of a female jinn aiming to win the heart of a human being and a drama film starring Shafeeu and Sheela Najeeb, Kahvalhah Dhaandhen (2002). Featuring Shafeeu and Mariyam Nisha in lead roles, the former received poor reviews from critics.

This was followed by a series of poorly received horror films. In 2003, he released the romantic horror film Dhonkamana (2003) which depicts the romantic relationship between a young man (Yoosuf Shafeeu) and an old woman (Fauziyya Hassan). Starring additional cast including Sheela Najeeb, Niuma Mohamed, Sheereen Abdul Wahid, Amira Ismail and Aminath Rasheedha, received mainly negative reviews from critics though its inclusion of the theme portraying the relationship between a couple with a large age gap was appraised. The following year, his next directorial venture Sandhuravirey 2 (2004) which was a sequel to his 2002 horror film Sandhuravirey. Marked as the first Maldivian sequel, the cast of the film includes Shafeeu, Niuma Mohamed, Zeenath Abbas, Mohamed Shavin and Sheereen Abdul Wahid. Similar to its prequel, the film received negative response from critics.

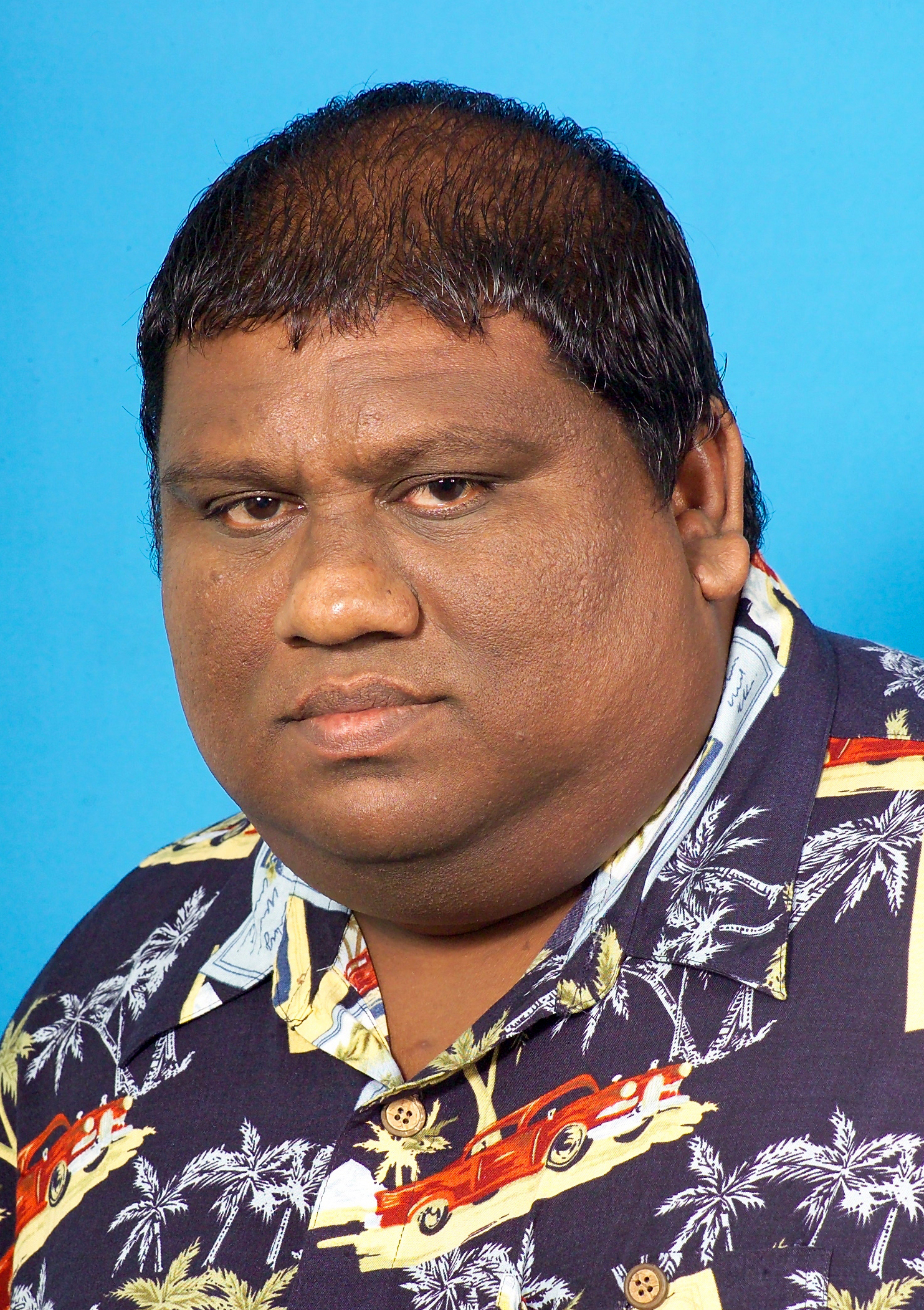
Ibrahim in 2006

In 2009, he again worked in two romantic horror films Udhabaani and Baaraige Fas. The former stars Yoosuf Shafeeu as the boyfriend of a school student (Amira Ismail) who has been harassed by a supernatural force. Upon release, the film received mixed reviews from critics although it performed well at the box office, making it Ibrahim's most successful venture. The latter follows a temptress vampire (Mariyam Nisha) who goes into a killing spree to quench her thirst. The film received mainly negative reviews from critics though he fetched his only Maldives Film Award nomination as the Best Director.

This was followed by a horror film, Mendhamuge Evaguthu (2010) co-written and co-directed by him alongside Yoosuf Shafeeu. It follows a group of ten friends watching a horror film which is being influenced by a narration in it. His next horror film Vakinuvinama (2010) was a critical and commercial failure. This was followed by his family drama Hithey Dheymee (2011) which received negative reviews from critics and was a box office disaster. The same year, his suspense thriller film Hafaraaiy (2011) was released starring Yoosuf Shafeeu, Ali Shameel, Mariyam Shakeela, Amira Ismail and Fathimath Fareela, which was a critical and commercial failure. Based on a real incident, the film narrates a story of a cannibal woman who is addicted to eating human flesh, how she victimised the inhabitants with her face covered in a veil. The film received criticism for its "fragile" plot, "unnecessary" characters though its makeup was appreciated. Ahmed Naif from Sun wrote: "neither scientifically nor psychologically, it has been proven in the film how a chicken addict turns to be a cannibal. The film slides from a suspense thriller to a comedy for its inclusion of inconceivable details".

After the film Hafaraaiy (2011), Ibrahim took a break of eight years before returning to the work of film direction. In 2018, he released another horror film Reyvumun which marks his fifty-second direction.

== Filmography ==
=== Feature films ===
Year	Title	Director	Screenplay	Notes	Ref(s)
1996	Huras	Yes	Yes		
1997	Hinithun	Yes	Yes		
1997	Loabeega Aniyaa	Yes	Yes		
1998	Mila Handhuvaru			Starred as Adamfulhu	
1999	Qurbaani	Yes			
2000	Hiyy Halaaku			Special appearance as a parent	
2000	Ainbehge Loabi Firiehge Vaajib	Yes	Yes		
2000	Majubooru Loabi	Yes		Special appearance in Shifna & Naushad's wedding	
2001	Aaah	Yes		Starred as Javid; Junaid's father	
2002	Sandhuravirey	Yes	Yes		
2002	Kahvalhah Dhaandhen	Yes	Yes		
2003	Dhonkamana	Yes	Yes		
2004	Sandhuravirey 2	Yes			
2006	Hithuge Edhun	Yes			
2009	Udhabaani	Yes	Yes		
2009	Baaraige Fas	Yes	Yes	Nominated - Maldives Film Award for Best Director	
2010	Mi Hiyy Keekkuraanee?	Yes			
2010	Dhin Veynuge Hithaamaigaa			Special appearance in the song "Annaashey Hinithunvelamaa"	
2010	Mendhamuge Evaguthu	Yes	Yes		
2010	Vakinuvinama	Yes			
2011	Hafaraaiy	Yes			
2011	Hithey Dheymee	Yes	Yes		
2018	Reyvumun	Yes	Yes		
2024	Udhabaani 2	Yes	Yes		
TBA	Dheythee Aniyaa	Yes			
TBA	Gilan	Yes		Also the producer	

=== Short films ===
Year	Title	Director	Screenplay	Notes	Ref(s)
2001	Paree Dhahtha	Yes	Yes	Children's short-film	
2001	Santhi Mariyanbu 1	Yes	Yes	Children's short-film	
2001	Safaru Kaiydha	Yes	Yes	Children's short-film	
2001	Foolhu Dhigu Handi	Yes	Yes	Children's short-film	
2004	Falhi Sikunthu 1	Yes	Yes		
2004	Keymaatu	Yes	Yes	Children's short-film	
2007	Santhi Mariyanbu 2	Yes	Yes	Children's short-film	
2007	Foolhu Dhigu Handi 2	Yes	Yes	Children's short-film	
2007	Jinneenge Dharubaaru	Yes	Yes	Children's short-film	
2007	Kudafoolhaai Paree Dhahtha	Yes	Yes	Children's short-film	
2008	Guest House Room Number:201	Yes	Yes		
2008	Kurafi Dhaadha	Yes	Yes	Children's short-film	
2009	Loaraiybe	Yes	Yes	Children's short-film	
2009	Santhi Mariyanbu 3	Yes	Yes	Children's short-film	
2012	Safaru Kaiydha 2	Yes	Yes	Children's short-film	
2014	Fensiru	Yes	Yes	Children's short-film	

=== Television ===
Year	Title	Director	Screenplay	Notes	Ref(s)
1995	Maaburuge Usoolu	Yes		Teledrama	
1996	Veyn	Yes		Teledrama	
2004	Kamana Vareh Neiy	Yes		5 episodes	
2019	Shhh	Yes		5 episodes	
2020	Hanaa	Yes		13 episodes	
2022	Bridge	Yes	Yes	10 episodes	

== Accolades ==
Year	Award	Category	Nominated work	Result	Ref(s)
2006	National Award of Recognition	Performing Arts - Film direction		Won	
2011	1st Maldives Film Awards	Best Director	Baaraige Fas	Nominated	
