= Hilihilaa =

2001 film directed by Ahmed Nimal

- Official film poster
- Directed by: Ahmed Nimal
- Written by: Ahmed Nimal
- Screenplay by: Ahmed Nimal
- Produced by: Shiham Rasheed
- Starring: Asad Shareef; Niuma Mohamed; Mariyam Nazima; Sheela Najeeb
- Cinematography: Hassan Haleem; Ali Rasheed
- Music by: Zaid
- Production company: Motion Pictures
- Release date: July 4, 2001
- Running time: 163 minutes
- Country: Maldives
- Language: Dhivehi

Hilihilaa is a 2001 Maldivian melodrama film written and directed by Ahmed Nimal. Produced by Shiham Rasheed under Motion Pictures, the film stars Asad Shareef, Niuma Mohamed, Ahmed Shimau, Mariyam Nazima and Sheela Najeeb in pivotal roles. The entire film was shot in K. Kaashidhoo.

== Premise ==
Dr. Anil (Ahmed Shimau) relocates to an island to fill a vacant job at the Island's Health Centre, where he meets a stunning young lady, Lailaa (Mariyam Nazima) who happens to know all the details about Anil. His neighbor, Abdul Azeez (Ahmed Nimal) seeks medical help from Anil to diagnose his sister, Zaina (Niuma Mohamed) who is chained to bed due to her mental condition. The root cause for her adverse situation remains unknown though the locals believe she is suffering from post-traumatic stress disorder followed by the peculiar death of her husband, Haidhar (Asad Shareef).

== Cast ==
- Asad Shareef as Haidhar
- Niuma Mohamed as Zaina
- Mariyam Nazima as Lailaa / Nazla
- Sheela Najeeb as Haseena
- Ahmed Nimal as Abdul Azeez
- Ahmed Shah as Fazeel
- Ahmed Shimau as Dr. Anil
- Hussain Shibau as Dhoney
- Ali Rasheed as Hassan

== Soundtrack ==
Track listing
No.	Title	Lyrics	Singer(s)	Length
1.	"Fun Inthizaarehgaa"	Easa Shareef	Fazeela Amir
2.	"Gaathuga Hurumun"	Mohamed Huzam	Mohamed Huzam, Shifa Thaufeeq
3.	"Edhemey Inkaaru Nuvun"	Abdul Hannan Moosa Didi	Abdul Hannan Moosa Didi
4.	"Ey Loaibaa Majuboorey"	Kaneeru Abdul Raheem	Ali Rameez
