= Kaashidhoo =

Kaashidhoo as a place name may refer to:

- Kaashidhoo (Gaafu Dhaalu Atoll) (Republic of Maldives)
- Kaashidhoo (Kaafu Atoll) (Republic of Maldives)
