= Loabi Nuvevununama =

- Official film poster
- Directed by: Ahmed Shimau
- Written by: Fathimath Nahula
- Screenplay by: Fathimath Nahula
- Starring: Mariyam Nisha; Yoosuf Shafeeu; Mariyam Nazima; Moosa Zakariyya; Ahmed Shimau
- Cinematography: Mohamed Rasheed
- Edited by: Sadha Ahmed
- Music by: Mohamed Ikram
- Release date: March 26, 2002
- Country: Maldives
- Language: Dhivehi

Loabi Nuvevununama (English translation: If I didn't fall in love) is a 2002 Maldivian drama film directed by Ahmed Shimau. Produced under Mapa Films, the film stars Mariyam Nisha, Yoosuf Shafeeu, Mariyam Nazima, Moosa Zakariyya and Shimau in pivotal roles.

== Plot ==
Lahufa (Mariyam Nisha), a vulnerable woman relocates herself to Male' with the help of Adam (Chilhiya Moosa Manik) to flee from an arranged marriage to an old man by her step-mother. She was welcomed with great hospitality by Shakeel (Ahmed Shimau), a heart patient, and his sibling-like-friend, Ziyad (Yoosuf Shafeeu) who instantly falls in love with her. Shakeel's fiancé, Nasma (Mariyam Nazima), a greedy woman desperately planning her marriage with Shakeel in need of money, envies Lahufa and tries to spoil her relationship with Ziyad. Soon, he departs to India for a training. One day, Lahufa accidentally drops a glass on his feet, badly cutting his leg which worsens while infection spreads. The couple had to delay their forthcoming wedding which Nasma blames on Lahufa. After several tests, the doctors inform that the injury is beyond healing and advises him to cut off his leg to stop infection from spreading further.

Nasma cancels her wedding and lures Saud (Moosa Zakariyya), Shakeel's friend, in her trap accusing Shakeels has an affair with Lahufa. She accompanies Shakeel to Nasma's house where she reveals that she has no intention to marry a handicapped man. Misinterpreting a phone conversation between Shakeel and Ziyad, Lahufa believed Ziyad is having an affair with Shifana, a girl residing in India, hence agreed to marry Shakeel. A day after their wedding, Ziyad calls Lahufa and proposes her to marry him. Upon returning, he was devastated to discover Shakeel's situation and his marriage to Lahufa.

== Cast ==
- Yoosuf Shafeeu as Ziyad
- Mariyam Nisha as Lahufa
- Mariyam Nazima as Nasma
- Moosa Zakariyya as Saud
- Ahmed Shimau as Shakeel
- Arifa Ibrahim as Nasma's mother
- Abdul Raheem as Nasma's father
- Chilhiya Moosa Manik as Adambe

== Soundtrack ==
Track listing
| No. | Title | Lyrics | Singer(s) | Length |
|---|---|---|---|---|
| 1. | "Sirrun Mihithaa" | Mausoom Shakir | Ali Rameez | 4:26 |
| 2. | "Dhiriulhumakee Fahe Kobaa" | Boi Ahmed Khaleel | Mukhthar Adam | 3:43 |
| 3. | "Rovenee Hithaamain Gislaa" | Mausoom Shakir | Umar Zahir | 4:36 |
| 4. | "Loabin Magey Hiy" | Mausoom Shakir | Hassan Ilham, Fathimath Rauf | 6:14 |
| 5. | "Naadhey Mirey Ninjeh" | Mausoom Shakir | Ali Rameez | 4:56 |
| 6. | "Mihithuge Loaibey Thee" | Mausoom Shakir | Ali Rameez, Fazeela Amir | 6:19 |
| 7. | "Thiya Hiy Adhu Naseebuga" | Boi Ahmed Khaleel | Umar Zahir, Fathimath Zoona | 7:17 |
