= Maafkuraashey =

Maldivian television series

- Written by: Abdul Faththaah
- Screenplay by: Abdul Faththaah
- Directed by: Amila Adam
- Starring: Moosa Zakariyya; Niuma Mohamed; Mariyam Nazima; Ahmed Saeed; Koyya Hassan Manik; Fauziyya Hassan; Mariyam Haleem
- Music by: Muaviath Anwar
- Country of origin: Maldives
- Original language: Divehi
- No. of seasons: 1
- No. of episodes: 10

Production
- Cinematography: Hussain Imthiyaz
- Editors: Hussain Niyaz; Mohamed Mujah; Ahmed Irshan; Hassan Nishath
- Running time: 22-25 minutes
- Production company: Television Maldives

Original release
- Network: Television Maldives
- Release: November 11, 1999 – 23 January 2000

Maafkuraashey is a Maldivian television series written by Abdul Faththaah and directed by Amila Adam. It stars Niuma Mohamed, Moosa Zakariyya and Mariyam Nazima in pivotal roles. The series also starts Fauziyya Hassan, Koyya Hassan Manik, Ahmed Saeed and Zeenath Abbas while Mariyam Nisha also stars in a brief role.

The series follow Moosa as his marriage to the gentle and devoted Niuma unravels due to his affair with Nazima, exposing a destructive love triangle driven by betrayal, obsession, and the consequences of his inability to change. The series consisting of total ten episodes was released on 11 November 1999 and concluded on 23 January 2000.

== Premise ==
The story centers on Moosa’s turbulent relationships with Niuma and Nazima, revealing his inability to remain faithful or emotionally responsible. After marrying Niuma, Moosa initially appears settled. However, his old habits resurface when he becomes involved with Nazima, a new colleague whose growing attraction to him fuels jealousy and tension. As Niuma becomes pregnant, she senses Moosa’s emotional withdrawal and growing closeness to Nazima, leaving her increasingly anxious and heartbroken.

Nazima’s fixation on Moosa deepens, while Moosa dismisses the affair as insignificant, refusing to acknowledge the damage it causes. Niuma endures the betrayal in silence, attempting to save her marriage and even confronting Nazima directly, but her efforts fail. Moosa ultimately chooses Nazima, divorcing Niuma and shattering her life. His decision strains his relationship with his parents and leads him into a difficult and conflict-filled life with Nazima.

== Cast and characters ==
=== Main ===
- Moosa Zakariyya as Moosa
- Niuma Mohamed as Niuma
- Mariyam Nazima as Nazima
- Ahmed Saeed as Saeed
- Koyya Hassan Manik as Hassan
- Fauziyya Hassan as Fauziyya
- Mariyam Haleem as Mariyam; sister of Niuma

=== Recurring ===
- Zeenath Abbas as Zeenath
- Ihusaana as Ihusaana
- Mariyam Nisha as Mary; wife of Saeed
- Shiriyan as Shiriyan; a friend of Saeed and husband of Ihusaana
- Afnaan as baby Afnaan
- Moomina as Moonty; Niuma's friend

=== Guest ===
- Ismail Wajeeh as Moosa's boss (Episode 2)
- Aminath Rasheedha as Mary's mother (Episode 5)
- Haajara Abdul Kareem as Haajara; Nazima's mother (Episode 8)
- Hassan Afeef as Doctor (Episode 9)

== Episodes ==
No.	Title	Directed by	Editor	Original release date
1	"Episode 1"	Amila Adam	Hussain Niyaz	November 11, 1999
Moosa, the only son of Fauziyya and Hassan, works at the airport but struggles with punctuality. His mother constantly worries about his late-night returns and lack of focus, while his colleague Saeed often covers for him despite sharing concerns over Moosa’s flirtatious behavior. Though Moosa is in a relationship with Zeenath, he continues to pursue other women, including his coworker Ihusaana and Niuma, a hotel receptionist.
2	"Episode 2"	Amila Adam	Hussain Niyaz	November 21, 1999
Fauziyya urges Moosa to settle down and start a family, but he continues his flirtatious behavior with Niuma and Ihusaana. Meanwhile, Zeenath expresses her desire to marry him, though Moosa repeatedly avoids the conversation, offering various excuses to delay commitment. The situation takes a turn when Zeenath unexpectedly catches Moosa with Ihusaana, shattering her trust.
3	"Episode 3"	Amila Adam	Hussain Niyaz	November 28, 1999
Zeenath confronts Ihusaana about the incident, which Ihusaana insists was a genuine mistake. She advises Zeenath to distance herself from Moosa, warning that he is not ready for a serious commitment—a truth Zeenath struggles to accept. Disillusioned, Ihusaana asks Moosa to stop contacting her, while Zeenath also decides to step away from his life. Unfazed, Moosa turns his attention toward Niuma, attempting to win her over. Saeed later introduces Niuma to Moosa’s mother, Fauziyya, further intertwining their lives.
4	"Episode 4"	Amila Adam	Hussain Niyaz	December 5, 1999
Niuma begins helping Fauziyya with daily chores, surprising Moosa with her kindness. Meanwhile, she worries about her sister Mariyam, who has been struggling with infertility. Although Niuma is interested in Moosa and open to beginning a relationship, Mariyam—aware of Moosa’s past behavior—voices her concerns, which Niuma refuses to accept. She reassures her sister that she will think carefully before committing. At home, Hassan remains troubled by Moosa’s continued irresponsibility and lack of direction in life.
5	"Episode 5"	Amila Adam	Moosa Haleem, Mujuthaba Rasheed, Ahmed Irushan	December 12, 1999
Saeed travels to the island to be with his wife Mary as her pregnancy complications worsen, but she tragically passes away that same night. Meanwhile, Niuma and Moosa marry and enjoy a brief honeymoon. Upon returning to work, Moosa encounters a new colleague, Nazima—an introduction that quietly hints at new tensions to come.
6	"Episode 6"	Amila Adam	Ahmed Irushan	December 19, 1999
Six months into their marriage, Niuma and Moosa receive the joyful news of her pregnancy. But Moosa, unchanged in his habits, continues to flirt with Nazima—who gradually begins to reciprocate his attention. To Moosa, it remains nothing more than a casual fling. At home, Fauziyya and Hassan urge the couple to move back in with them, wanting to support Niuma during her pregnancy. Niuma eventually meets Nazima and is immediately unsettled, describing her as disrespectful and lacking manners. Nazima, in turn, grows increasingly jealous of Moosa’s commitment to his pregnant wife, fueling her own fixation on him.
7	"Episode 7"	Amila Adam	Hassan Nishath	December 25, 1999
Niuma eventually witnesses Moosa and Nazima together, leaving her devastated. Despite this, Moosa continues to secretly meet and call Nazima while Niuma suffers in silence. When she confronts him about becoming increasingly distant, Moosa dismisses her concerns and insists that Nazima is nothing more than a colleague. Feeling helpless, Niuma turns to Saeed, hoping he can make Moosa understand the value and responsibility of a committed married life.
8	"Episode 8"	Amila Adam	Hussain Niyaz	January 1, 2000
Encouraged by her mother, Nazima continues her affair with Moosa, while Saeed warns him to reconsider his choices. Moosa grows more drawn to Nazima, ignoring Niuma’s suffering, and shows an aggressive side when she speaks out against her unfair life. Desperate to save her marriage, Niuma begs Nazima to step away, but Nazima refuses. The confrontation turns bitter, and Moosa ultimately divorces Niuma, leaving her heartbroken.
9	"Episode 9"	Amila Adam	Mohamed Mujah, Hassan Nishath, Ahmed Irshan	January 9, 2000
Saeed confronts Moosa over his aggressive behavior, while Fauziyya senses something wrong in Moosa and Niuma’s marriage. Moosa finally admits to Fauziyya that he plans to marry another woman, which enrages her—especially when she learns about the divorce. Despite this, Moosa continues his relationship with Nazima but grows bitter over her in-laws’ affection for Niuma. Determined to gain his mother’s approval, Moosa pushes forward with his pursuit of Nazima.
10	"Episode 10"	Amila Adam	Hassan Nishath, Ahmed Irshan	January 23, 2000
Nazima’s laziness and disrespectful behavior gradually surface, but Moosa tolerates it. When his parents finally confront him about Nazima about her attire and manners, Moosa storms out of the house. Life with Nazima becomes increasingly difficult, yet Moosa clings to the relationship at any cost. Over time, Moosa realizes Niuma’s true worth and the respect she once showed him, but she tells him it is too late—she no longer recognizes the man he has become. He then understands that Nazima married him out of greed, not love, and ultimately divorces her as well. Fauziyya later pleads with Niuma to return, assuring her that Moosa has changed, but despite Moosa’s own heartfelt apology, Niuma remains firm in her decision.

== Soundtrack ==
Track listing
No.	Title	Lyrics	Music	Singer(s)	Length
1.	"Jaadhoogar Dheythee Aniyaa"	Boi Ahmed Khaleel	Mohamed Ikram	Ali Rameez, Fazeela Amir
2.	"Hurin Rovifaa"			Mukhthar Adam

== Release and reception ==
The first episode of the series was released on 11 November 1999. It received mainly positive reviews from critics, who praised the script by Abdul Faththaah, the direction by Amila Adam, and the performances of the lead actors—Moosa Zakariyya, Niuma Mohamed, and Mariyam Nazima—as well as the supporting cast, including a cameo appearance by Mariyam Nisha. The scene in which Zakariyya leaves Mohamed after divorcing her was one of the highlights of the series.
