= Kardiva Channel =

Channel cutting across the Maldive atoll chain

Coordinates: 4°30′00″N 73°00′00″E

The Kardiva Channel (Dv: Kaashidhu Kandu) is a broad channel running from southwest to northeast and cutting across the Maldive atoll chain. This channel divides the Northern from the Central atolls of the Maldives.

This channel was important for ancient mariners plying along the spice route trying to bypass the long and dangerous shallow reefs of the Maldives without harm.

In the British Admiralty charts it is called Kardiva Channel. It appeared on the old French maps as Courant de Caridou. Locally, the northern part is known as Kaashidhoo Bodu Kandu, while the southern part is called Kaashidhoo Kuda Kandu.

Kardiva is the ancient Sanskritised name of Kaashidhu Island. This island lies towards the eastern end of this channel and gives its name to it. ("Kardiva Channel"). Kaashidhu Island is surrounded by deep waters and there is generally heavy surf all around. It has an oval-shaped lagoon (vilu) with a narrow fringing reef on its NW side.

== See also ==
- Kaashidhoo Bodu Kandu
- Kaashidhoo Kuda Kandu
