= Maazee =

- Official film poster
- Directed by: Mohamed Ali Manik
- Written by: Fathimath Nahula
- Screenplay by: Mohamed Ali Manik
- Produced by: Alifulhu
- Starring: Ismail Wajeeh; Jamsheedha Ahmed; Ali Shimree; Mariyam Nazima
- Cinematography: Zaki
- Edited by: Mohamed Ali Manik; Zaki
- Music by: Nafil
- Production company: Feeroz Audio
- Release date: 2000
- Country: Maldives
- Language: Dhivehi

Maazee is a 2000 Maldivian drama film directed by Mohamed Ali Manik. Produced by Feeroz Audio, the film stars Ismail Wajeeh, Jamsheedha Ahmed, Mariyam Nazima, Ali Shimree and Aminath Rasheedha in pivotal roles.

The film marks actors Wajeeh and Jamsheedha's only collaboration in the film industry. The film received warm response from critics while Wajeeh picked his performance in the film as one of his "finest and accomplished role". Maazee also marks actor Ali Seezan's first work in the industry by working as an assistant director in the film.

== Plot ==
Naeema (Sakeena) a wealthy and reputed woman visits her homeland along with her husband to peace their mind after her unfortunate incidence of giving birth to a stillborn baby. They request Zubeydha (Aminath Rasheedha) to allow her daughter, Neeza (Mariyam Azza) to stay with them in Male' ensuring a prosperous and educated life, promising to love her as their own. Despondent, Zubeydha agreed to their terms concerning for Neeza's future, while Neeza squabbled to stay at the island having the fear of separating with her best-friend Ahmed, whom she hangouts with all day.

Years later, Ahmed (Ismail Wajeeh) visits Male' and was shocked when Neeza (Jamsheedha Ahmed) who now is in a romantic relationship with Shimau (Ali Shimree), fails to recognize him. Ahmed decided to stay in Male'. Having the need to consult a doctor, Zubeydha relocates to Male' and was astounded to see her disparate from her childhood life and liking. Neeza acts rude and cold-hearted towards Zubeydha, treats her like a servant in the house. Ahmed, established himself as a victorious man through burden and struggles, and is now the head of a successful company while changing his complete identity omitting his surname for its forlorn attachments.

Preparations for Neeza and Shimau's wedding commences, discomforting Zubeydha, since she has promised Hussain (Abdul Raheem) and Saeedha (Mariyam Haleem) to wed her daughter to Ahmed. Imran starts a romantic relationship with his secretary, Sama (Mariyam Nazima). After meeting reformed Imran, Neeza falls for him and starts avoiding Shimau. At her birthday party, Imran sends her a necklace which she handed over to him as a memory of her during their childhood. Neeza realizing the grave mistake and discovering his identity runs to meet him where she witnesses Imran with Sama leaving the party.

== Cast ==
- Ismail Wajeeh as Ahmed Imran
- Jamsheedha Ahmed as Neeza
- Ali Shimree as Shimau
- Mariyam Nazima as Sama
- Aminath Rasheedha as Zubeydha
- Ibrahim Rasheed
- Sakeena as Naeema
- Mariyam Haleem as Saeedha
- Abdul Raheem as Hussain
- Mariyam Azza as Neeza

== Soundtrack ==
Track listing
No.	Title	Lyrics	Singer(s)	Length
1.	"Maazeege Eki Handhaanthah"		Ali Rameez
2.	"Hithuge Veriyaa"		Ali Rameez
3.	"Dhirihureemey Mithaa"	Boi Ahmed Khaleel	Shifa Thaufeeq, Abdul Hannan Moosa Didi
4.	"Manzileh Numevaa Musaafirekey"		Mohamed Huzam
