= Kaashidhoo Bodu Kandu =

Coordinates: 4.954°N 73.463°E

A channel in the Maldives. Since the island of Kaashidhoo is located in the midst of the Kaashidhoo Kandu, or Kardiva Channel it is often referred to as having two parts. Kaashidhoo Bodu Kandu is the part between of Lhaviyani Atoll Aligau and Gaafaru Falhu.

== See also ==
- Kardiva Channel
- Kaashidhoo Kuda Kandu
