= Kuruhinna Tharaagandu =

Archaeological site in Kaashidhoo, Maldives

Coordinates: 4.956628°N 73.462924°E

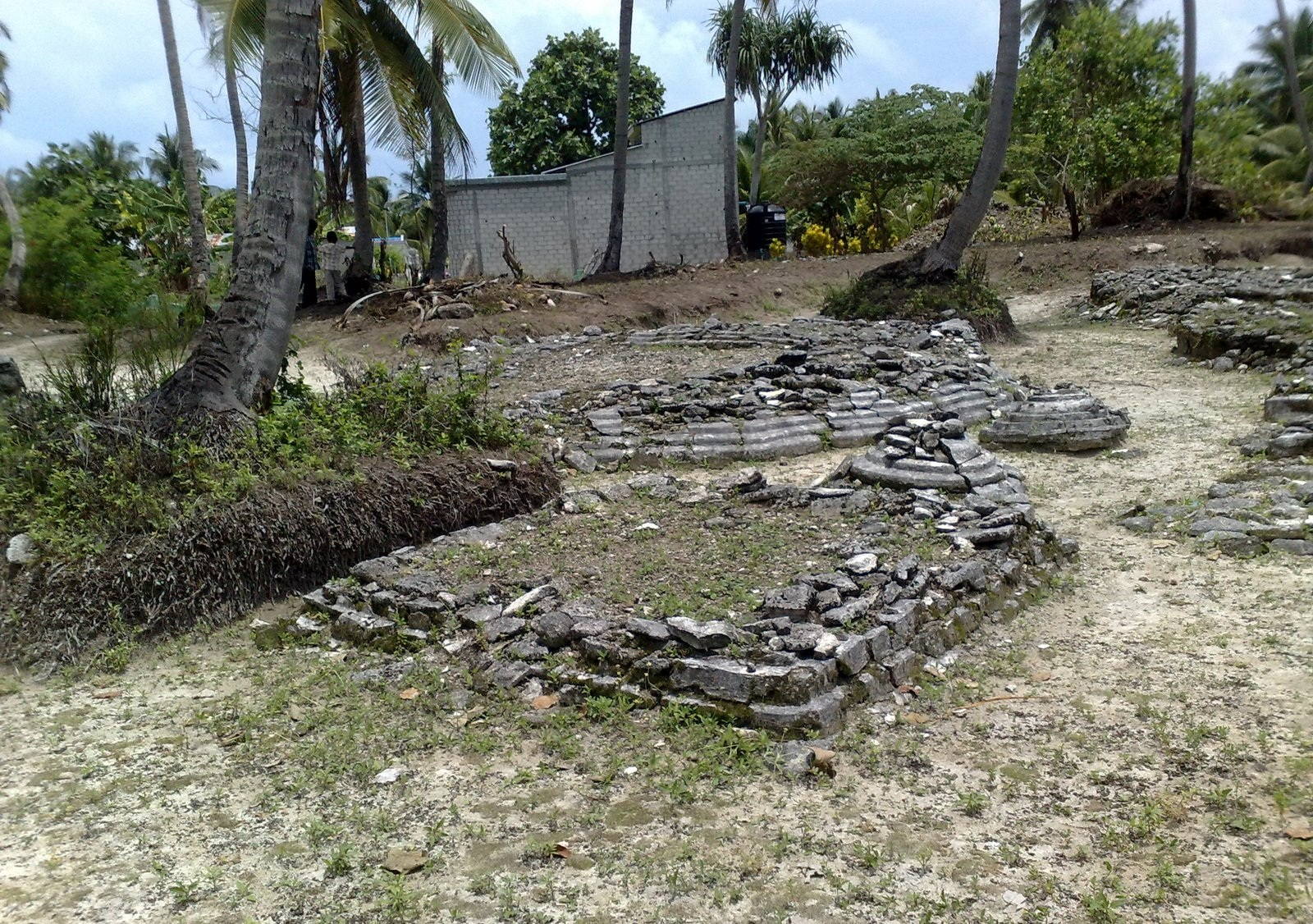
A photo of the archaeological site which shows the foundations that were uncovered when excavations began in 1996.

Kuruhinna Tharaagandu is an archaeological site in the island of Kaashidhoo, Maldives. The site was a Buddhist Monastery and is believed to have been used by pre-Islamic Maldivians dating back to the 7th to 8th century AD. The excavation work was done in various periods from February 1996 through 1998. During this period, an area of 1,880m^{2} was excavated, revealing 64 coral stone structures. For the vast majority, only the lower most parts have been preserved.

== Weathering and erosion ==
Due to the exposed nature of the archaeological site, and the fact that the structures were of coral stone, the site soon started showing signs of weathering and erosion. On 6 October 2008, US ambassador Robert O. Blake Jr. handed over a grant of 370,000 Rufiyaa ($28,950) under the Ambassador's Fund for Cultural Preservation, with the aim of helping the conservation efforts.

== Photo gallery ==
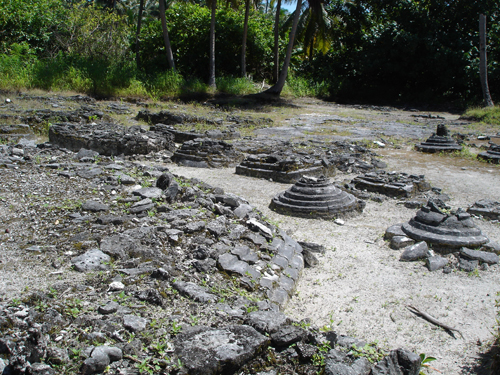

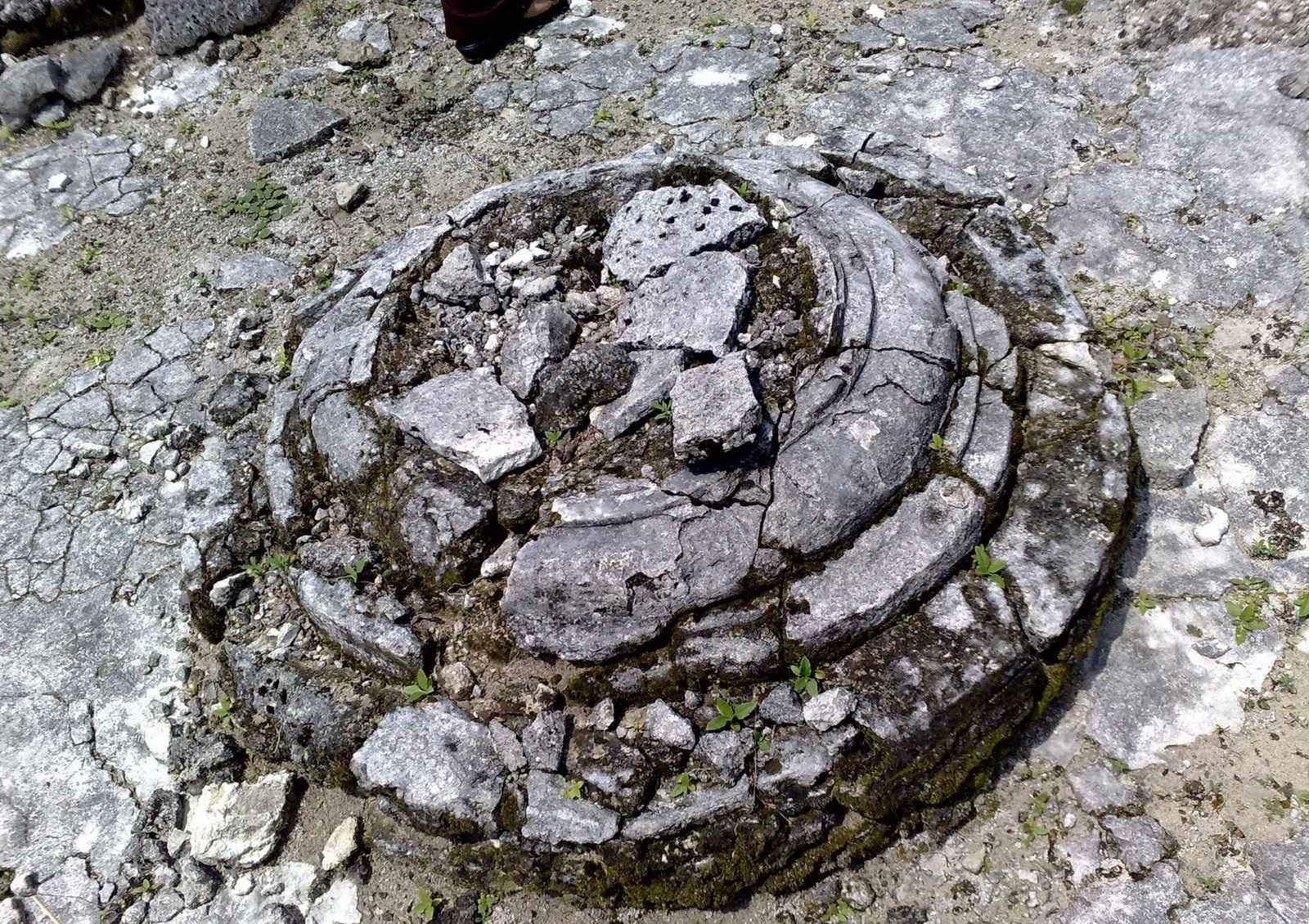

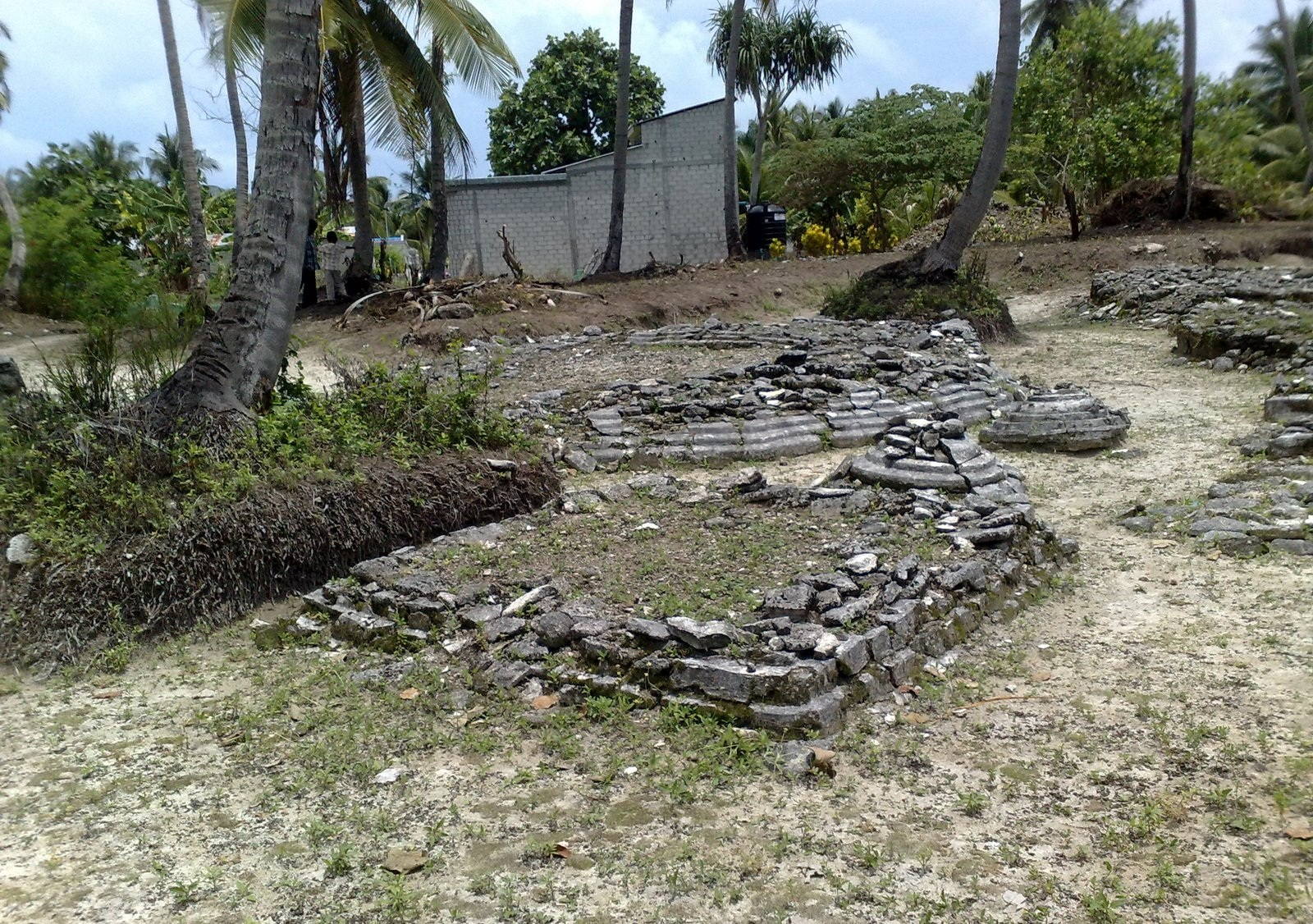

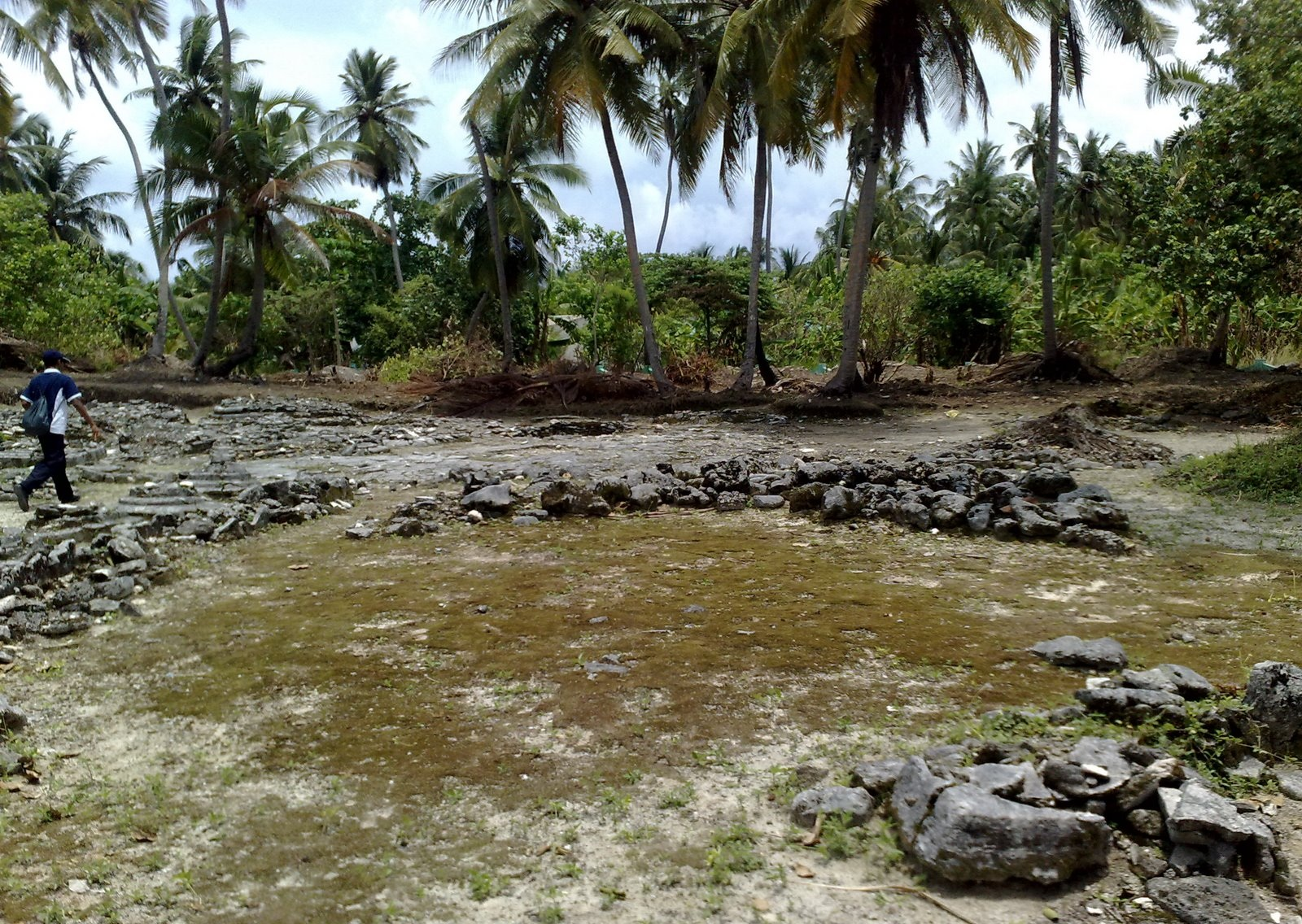

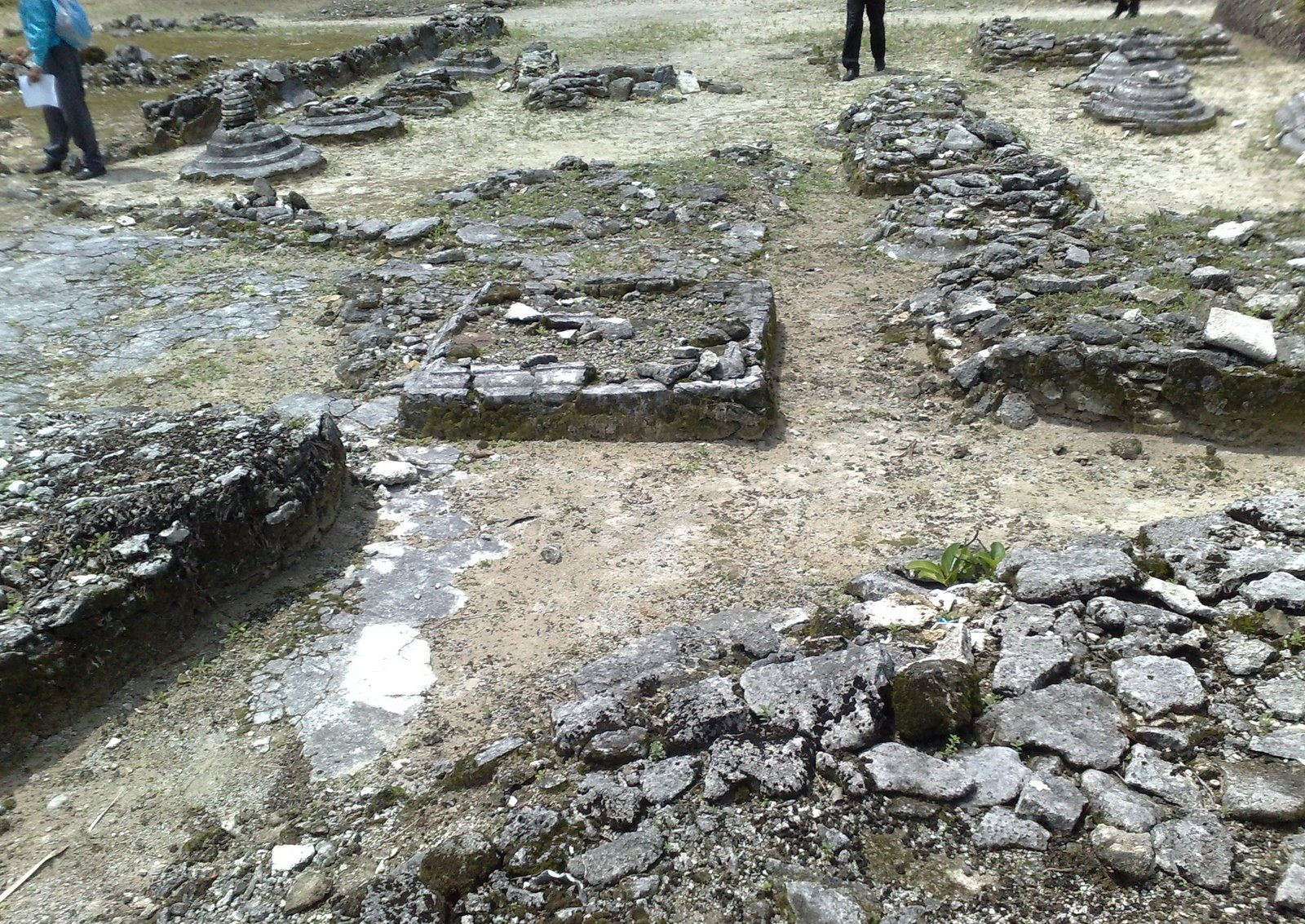

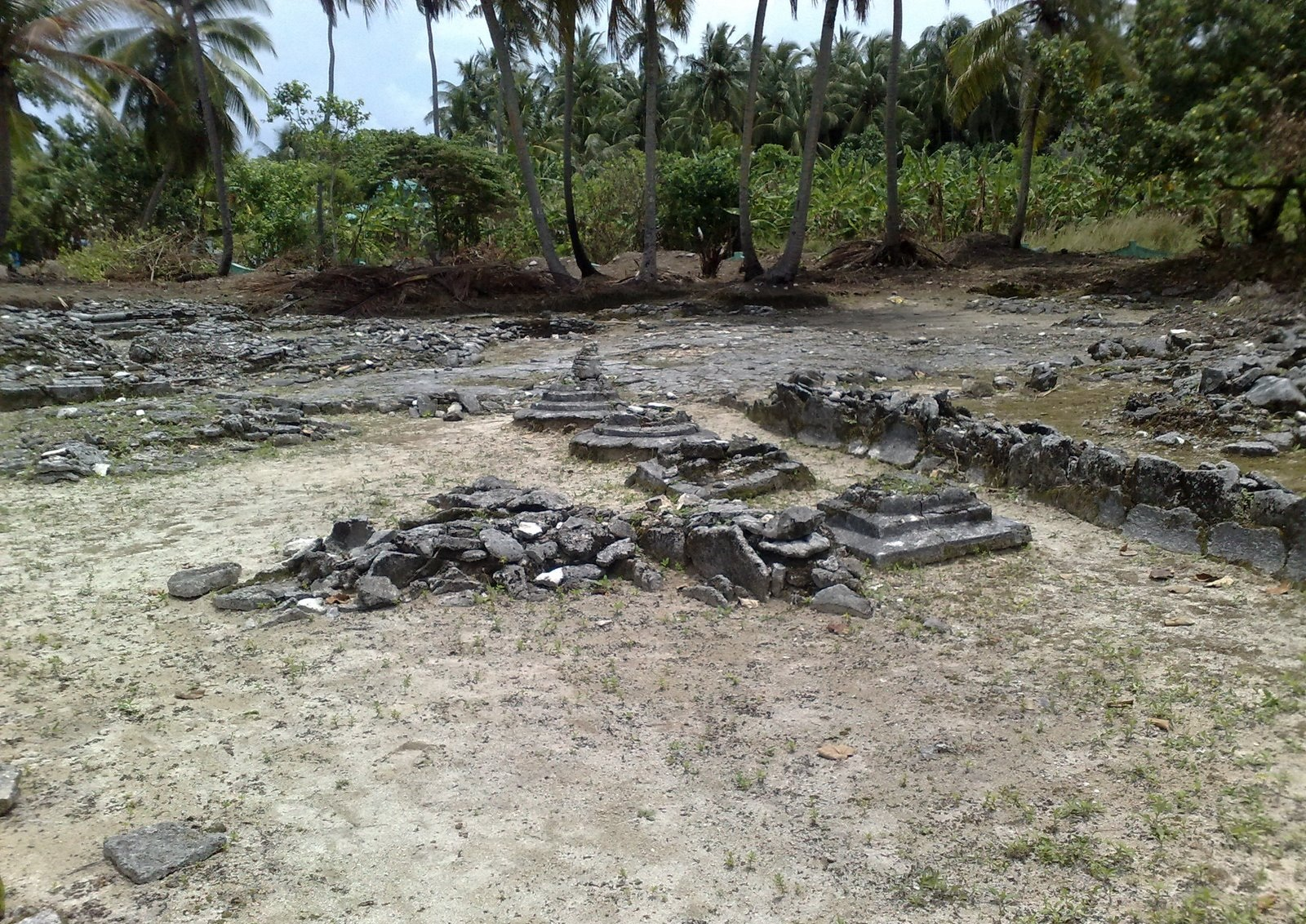

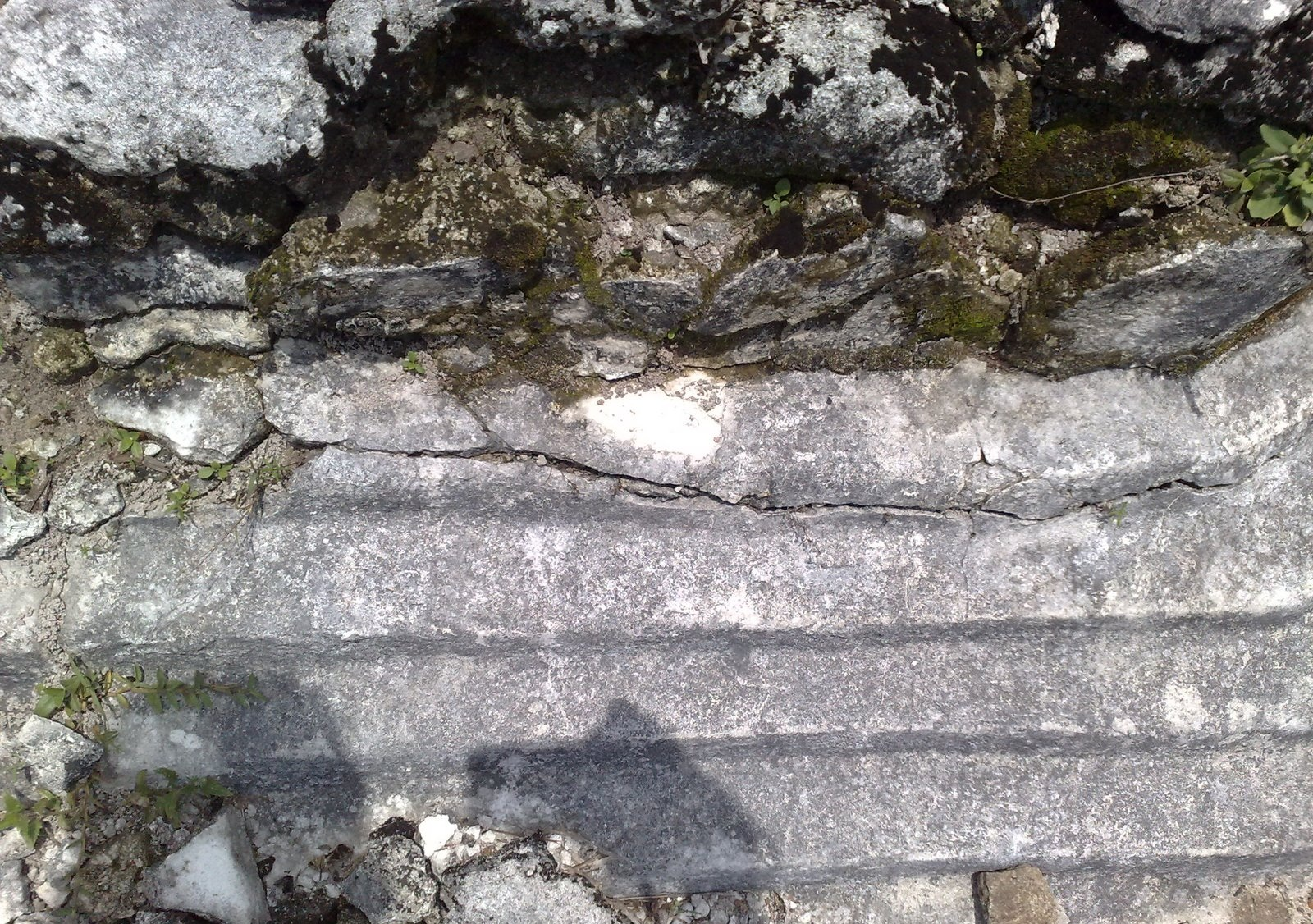

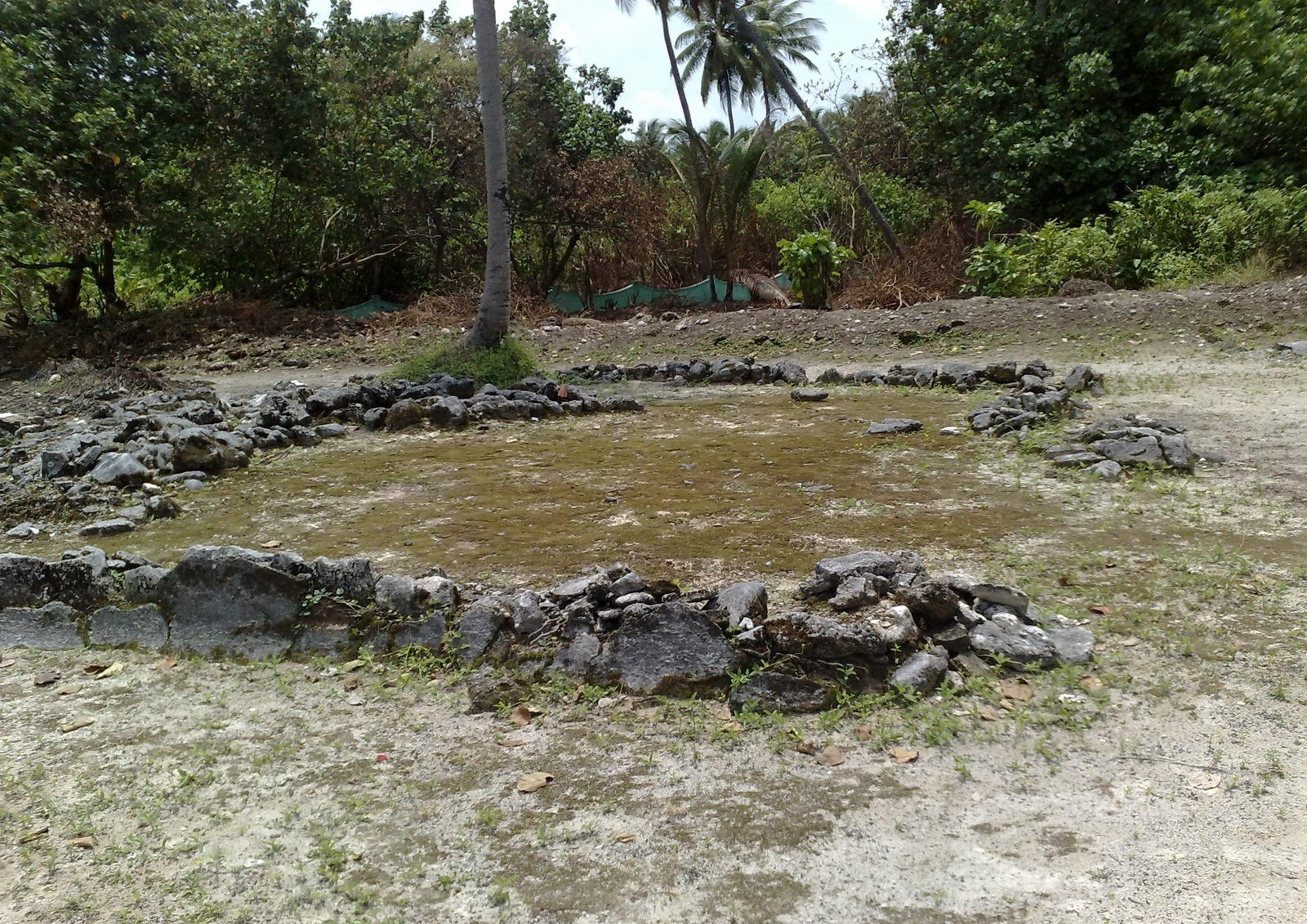

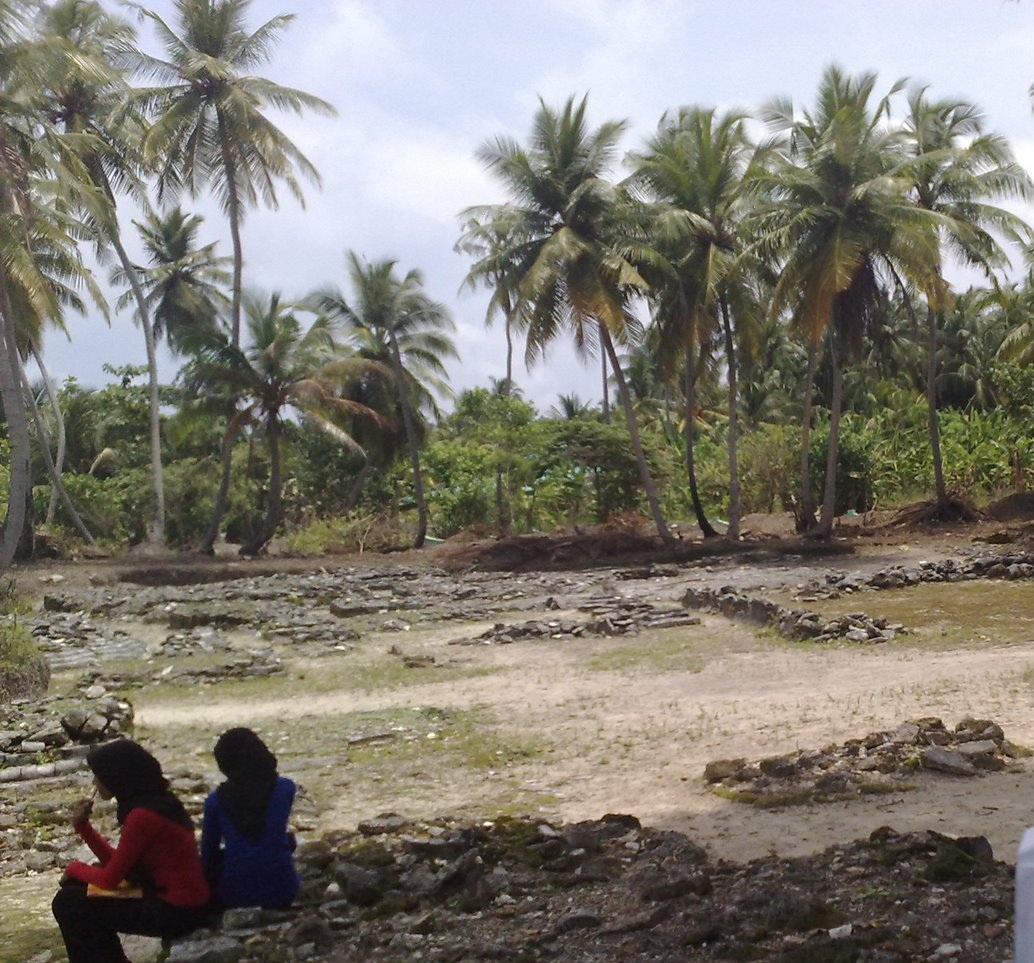

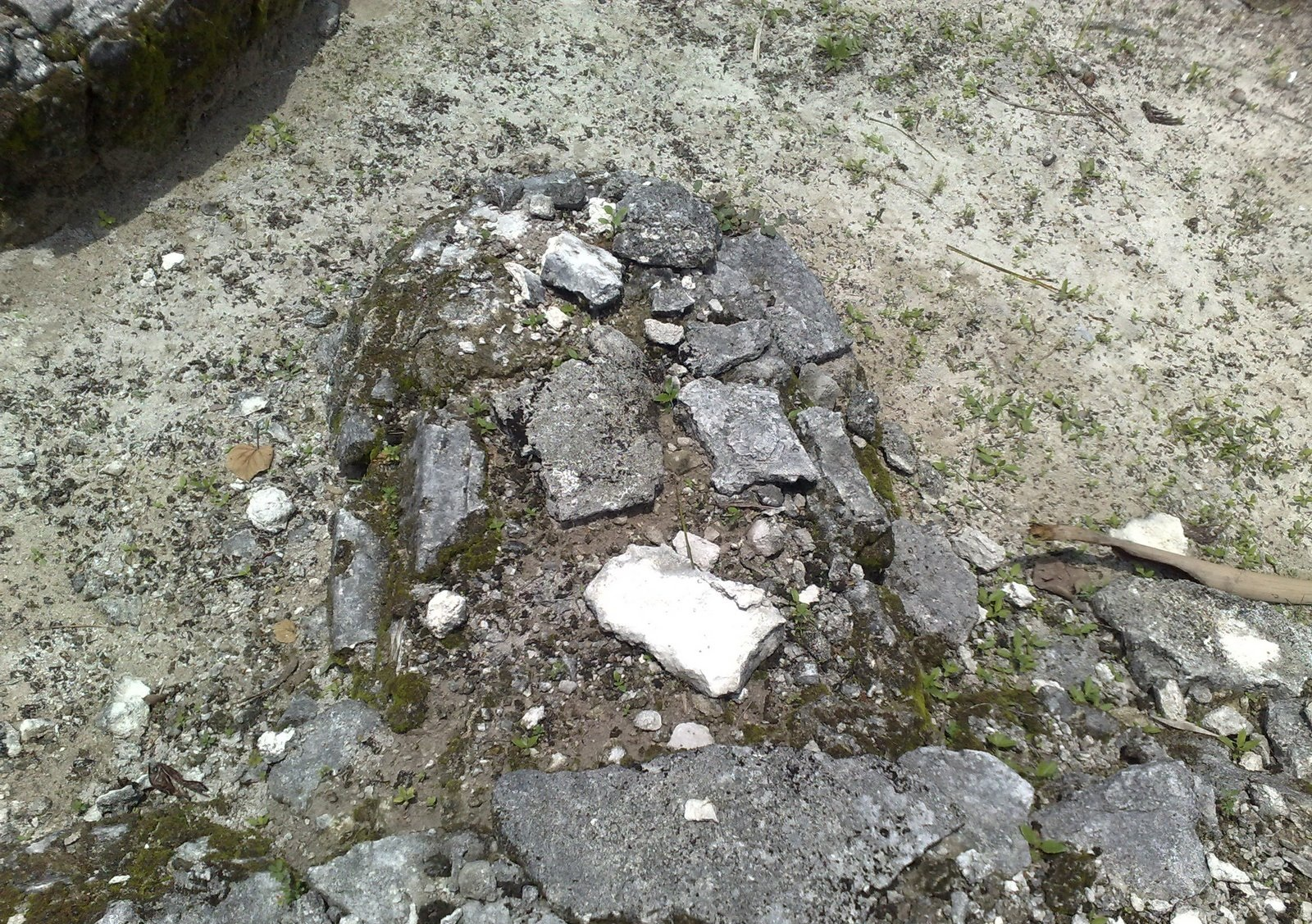

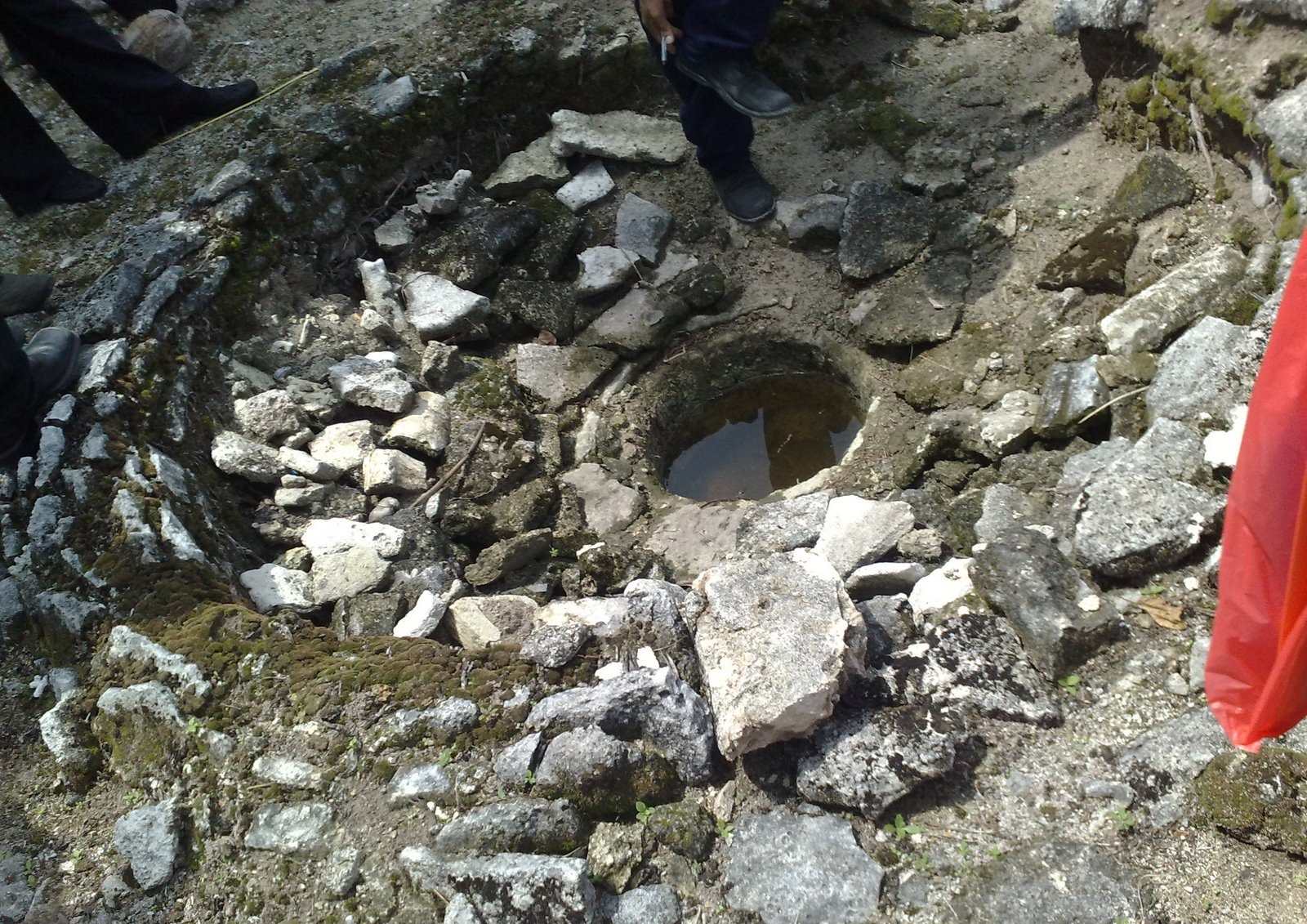
