= Saahibaa =

2000 film directed by Arifa Ibrahim

- Official film poster
- Directed by: Arifa Ibrahim
- Written by: Fathimath Nahula
- Screenplay by: Arifa Ibrahim
- Produced by: Aslam Rasheed
- Starring: Yoosuf Shafeeu; Mariyam Nazima; Fathimath Sharumeela
- Cinematography: Ibrahim Wisan
- Edited by: Ahmed Amir; Ahmed Mohamed Didi
- Music by: Mohamed Rasheed; Ahmed Sharmeel
- Production company: Slam Studio
- Release date: 2000
- Country: Maldives
- Language: Dhivehi

Saahibaa is a 2000 Maldivian romantic drama film directed by Arifa Ibrahim. Produced by Aslam Rasheed under Slam Studio, the film stars Yoosuf Shafeeu, Mariyam Nazima and Fathimath Sharumeela in pivotal roles.

== Premise ==
Shahudhu (Yoosuf Shafeeu) desperately searches for options to earn money which is needed for his wife, Fiyaza's (Mariyam Nazima) heart surgery. There, he meets a wealthy businessman, Fahumee (Ali Shameel) who agrees to lend him MVR 2,000,000 on one condition; marry his only child, an 18 years old stubborn young woman, Meena (Fathimath Sharumeela). The couple marry and follows a master-slave relationship as instructed by Fahumee. One night, Shahudhu saves Meena from being gang-raped, which results in Meena realizing his honesty and becomes romantically attached to him. However, Meena is heartbroken when she realizes that Shahudhu is deeply in love with his wife, Fiyaza. Meanwhile, Fiyaza reluctantly continues an affair with a divorcee, Waseem (Mohamed Afrah).

== Cast ==
- Yoosuf Shafeeu as Shahudhu
- Mariyam Nazima as Aminath Fiyaza
- Fathimath Sharumeela as Meena
- Ali Shameel as Fahumee
- Waleedha Waleed as Mariyam
- Mohamed Afrah as Waseem
- Yoosuf Naeem
- Mohamed Anil
- Neena Saleem as Mariyam's friend (Special appearance)
- Hassan Shafeeu
- Mariyam Azza
- Mohamed Thoha
- Ahid Ahmed
- Ibrahim Rasheed

== Soundtrack ==
Track listing
No.	Title	Lyrics	Singer(s)	Length
1.	"Kiyaadhevuneemaa Haal"	Ahmed Sharumeel	Ali Rameez, Fathimath Rauf
2.	"Thiya Khiyaal Abadhu Kurevey"	Ahmed Sharumeel	Mariyam Waheedha
3.	"Moonu Burugaa Negeemaa Mirey"	Kopee Mohamed Rasheedh	Ali Rameez
4.	"Ey Saahiba"	Ahmed Sharumeel	Ibrahim Rameez
