= Kaashidhoo Kuda Kandu =

Channel in the Maldives

Coordinates: 4.954°N 73.462°E

Kaashidhoo Kuda Kandu is a channel in the Maldives. Since the island of Kaashidhoo is located in the midst of the Kaashidhoo Kandu, or Kardiva Channel, it is often referred to as having two parts with Kuda Kaashidhoo Kandu as the channel south of Kaashidhoo island.

== See also ==
- Kardiva Channel
- Kaashidhoo Bodu Kandu
