= Ali Rameez =

Maldivian former playback singer (born 1971)

- Born: 22 August 1971 (age 55); Malé, Maldives
- Occupation: Islamic educator
- Musical career
- Genres: Pop; filmi; electronic
- Instrument: Vocals
- Years active: 1993–2003

Religious life
- Religion: Islam
- Movement: Salafi

Ali Rameez (born 22 August 1971) is a former singer from the Maldives.

== Early life and career ==
Ali Rameez was born and raised in a family that included Rafiyath Rameeza and Ibrahim Rameez. He started singing cover songs at local resorts before singing in films and studio albums. Soon after, he became the most commercially successful and popular artists to have worked in the Maldivian music industry.

In 2002, Rameez announced that he would leave music temporarily. Three years later, he said that he had quit music and "regrets" his involvement in it. He obtained a certificate to serve as an imam in 2010.

== Discography ==
=== Feature film ===
Year	Film	Song	Lyricist(s)	Co-artist(s)	Notes
1993	Udhaas	"Libunee Dheyhaa Khiyaal"		Solo	
1993	Udhaas	"Aee Eki Roalhin"		Solo	
1993	Udhaas	"Dheloa Furaa Ohoreynee"		Solo	Appears in Soundtrack album
1993	Udhaas	"Shoakhuvaa Hithaa Mey"		Sofa Thaufeeq	Appears in Soundtrack album
1993	Hadhiyaa	"Mi Raajjeyge Saafu Vai"	Hussain Shihab	Solo	
1996	Fun Asaru	"Neyngi Hithey Gendheveema"	Easa Shareef	Shifa Thaufeeq	
1996	Lheedharifulhu	"Loabi Dheyneyey Araam"		Shifa Thaufeeq	
1997	Hinithun	"Edheveythee Adhu Hurevey"	Ahmed Sharumeel	Fazeela Amir	
1997	Laila	"Vaathee Ma Kaireegaa"	Fathimath Nahula	Fazeela Amir	
1997	Laila	"Dhin Veynugaa Aawaaraa Vey" (Male Version)	Fathimath Nahula	Solo	
1997	Laila	"Meehekey Nikamethi"	Fathimath Nahula	Solo	Appears in Soundtrack album
1997	Laila	"Moonu Thee Han'dhunama Dhen"	Fathimath Nahula	Shifa Thaufeeq	Appears in Soundtrack album
1998	Fahuneyvaa	"Dhekefeemey Beevi Manzaru"	Boi Ahmed Khaleel	Fathimath Zoona	
1998	Fahuneyvaa	"Bunedheyn Dhathi Sirreh"	Ahmed Haleem	Fathimath Zoona	
1998	Fahuneyvaa	"Thi Khiyaalugaa"	Ahmed Haleem	Shifa Thaufeeq	
1998	Fahuneyvaa	"Nifasha I Love You"	Ahmed Haleem	Shifa Thaufeeq	Appears in Soundtrack album
1998	Ethoofaaneerey	"Nifasha I Love You"	Ahmed Haleem	Shifa Thaufeeq	
1998	Amaanaaiy	"Otheemaa Ummeedhugaa"	Abdul Raheem Rashad	Solo	
1998	Amaanaaiy	"Mihithaa Loabi Dheynan"	Mausoom Shakir	Fazeela Amir	
1999	Farudhaa	"Loabeegaa Ma Dheewaana Vey"		Solo	
1999	Qurbaani	"Karuthaa Fenun Hoadhi"		Solo	
1999	Umurah	"Hiyy Edhey Araamuvee"	Adam Naseer Ibrahim	Fathimath Zoona	
1999	Umurah	"Ey Loabi Dheyshey"	Adam Haleem Adnan	Rafiyath Rameeza	
1999	Umurah	"Umurunve Maazee Qaruneh Dhiyas"	Adam Haleem Adnan	Rafiyath Rameeza	
2000	Maazee	"Maazeege Eki Han'dhaanthah"		Solo	
2000	Maazee	"Hithuge Veriyaa Kamuga Veenama"		Solo	
2000	Maazee	"Thaqudheerugaa Vaan Nethee"		Solo	Appears in Soundtrack album
2000	Saahibaa	"Kiyaadhevuneemaa Haal"	Ahmed Sharumeel	Fathimath Rauf	
2000	Saahibaa	"Moonu Burugaa"	Kopee Mohamed Rasheed	Solo	
2000	Hiyy Halaaku	"Vindhaa Gulhaa Ley"	Ahmed Sharumeel	Fazeela Amir	
2000	Zalzalaa	"Vejjey Ma Hairaanve Dheewaanaa"	Abdul Hannan Moosa Didi	Fazeela Amir	
2000	2000 Vana Ufan Dhuvas	"Ey Sudhaa"	Easa Shareef	Solo	
2000	2000 Vana Ufan Dhuvas	"Dhekelaa Hithey Vanee"	Easa Shareef	Fathimath Zoona	
2000	Ainbehge Loabi Firiehge Vaajib	"Veynugaa Kuramey Dhuaa" (Male Version)	Ahmed Sharumeel	Solo	
2000	Hithu Vindhu	"Haalu Kiyaadhenhey"	Boi Ahmed Khaleel	Fazeela Amir	
2000	Hithu Vindhu	"Haadha Dheyhiyy Veyey Loabin"	Boi Ahmed Khaleel	Solo	
2000	Naaummeedhu	"Adhu Mivee Keehhe?"	Boi Ahmed Khaleel	Solo	
2000	Naaummeedhu	"Saadhavileyrey"	Boi Ahmed Khaleel	Fazeela Amir	
2000	Naaummeedhu	"Kalaayah Mihiyy"	Mausoom Shakir	Fathimath Zoona	
2001	Ranmuiy	"Ey Aashiqaa"	Kopee Mohamed Rasheed	Fazeela Amir	
2001	Dhumah Eri Thari	"Hithuge Raanee Vedheyshey"		Solo	
2001	Aaah	"Moonekey Jaazubee"	Adam Haleem Adnan	Solo	
2001	Aaah	"Loabin Mihithugaa"		Solo	
2001	Hilihilaa	"Ey Loaiybaa Majuboorey"	Kaneeru Abdul Raheem	Solo	
2001	Hiyy Heyokuraathi	"Theeyey Hayaathun Dhey Ufaa"	Ahmed Haleem	Fazeela Amir, Lubaina	
2001	Hiyy Heyokuraathi	"Maa Gayaanuve Dhen Thi Dhanee"	Ahmed Haleem	Solo	Appears in Soundtrack album
2001	Hithi Nimun	"Badhalugaa Heyokamuge"	Mariyam Waheedha	Solo	
2001	Hiiy Edhenee	"Hoahoa Govamun"	Easa Shareef	Fathimath Zoona	
2001	Hiiy Edhenee	"Moonu Nuforuvaashe"	Boi Ahmed Khaleel	Fazeela Amir	Appears in Soundtrack album
2002	Loabi Nuvevununama	"Sirrun Mihithaa Kulheneehey"	Mausoom Shakir	Solo	
2002	Loabi Nuvevununama	"Naadhey Mirey Ninjeh"	Mausoom Shakir	Solo	
2002	Loabi Nuvevununama	"Mihithuge Loaiybey Thee"	Mausoom Shakir	Fazeela Amir	
2002	Sandhuravirey	"Vevey Loabi Kiyaaladheyn"	Ahmed Haleem	Shifa Thaufeeq	
2002	Sandhuravirey	"Mirey Ishqugaa Kuruvaa"	Ahmed Haleem	Shifa Thaufeeq	
2002	Sandhuravirey	"Hithuga Loabin Kalaaey"	Ahmed Haleem	Fathimath Rauf	
2002	Kahvalhah Dhaandhen	"Abadhu Thiya Loabi"	Shifa Thaufeeq	Shifa Thaufeeq	
2002	Aan... Aharenves Loabivin	"Huvafen Dhekeynee"	Easa Shareef	Fazeela Amir	
2002	Aan... Aharenves Loabivin	"Maruvedhaaney"	Mausoom Shakir	Solo	
2003	Ginihila	"Fun Asarugaa Mihiyy"	Easa Shareef	Shifa Thaufeeq	
2003	Ginihila	"Dhekilan Edheythee"	Easa Shareef	Thohira Hussain	
2003	Edhi Edhi Hoadheemey	"Edhi Edhi Hoadheemey" (Version 1)	Kopee Mohamed Rasheed	Shifa Thaufeeq	
2003	Edhi Edhi Hoadheemey	"Dhonmoonakun Vidhuvaifiyey"	Kopee Mohamed Rasheed	Solo	
2003	Edhi Edhi Hoadheemey	"Fun Zakham Naaruthakaa"	Kopee Mohamed Rasheed	Solo	Appears in Soundtrack album
2003	Edhi Edhi Hoadheemey	"Wafaatherikan Uvaaleemaa"	Kopee Mohamed Rasheed	Solo	Appears in Soundtrack album
2005	Hureemey Inthizaarugaa	"Dhekilan Edheythee"	Easa Shareef	Thohira Hussain	Appears in Soundtrack album
2014	Aadheys	"Hoadheyey Edhi Hithugaa Vaathee"	Ahmed Haleem	Solo	
2014	Aadheys	"Thi Khiyaalugaa"	Ahmed Haleem	Shifa Thaufeeq	
2014	Aadheys	"Nifasha I Love You"	Ahmed Haleem	Shifa Thaufeeq	Deleted Song
2014	Aadheys	"Dhefuraana Ekuvefaavaa"	Easa Shareef	Rafiyath Rameeza	Deleted Song
2018	Thiya Loaibaa Dhurah	"Aavaa Han'dhaaney"	Boi Ahmed Khaleel	Fazeela Amir	
2018	Thiya Loaibaa Dhurah	"Dheewaanaa Mihira Vanee"	Boi Ahmed Khaleel	Solo	

=== Short films ===
Year	Title	Song	Lyricist(s)	Co-artist(s)	Notes
2005	Dheke Dhekeves 1	"Nidhaalumun Heeviyey"	Ahmed Nashid	Solo	
2008	Guest House Room Number:201	"Dheewaanaa Adhu Veeyey"		Solo	

=== Television ===
Year	Title	Song	Lyricist(s)	Co-artist(s)	Notes
1992	Salhi Baisaa	"Otheemaa Ummeedhugaa"	Abdul Raheem Rashad	Solo	
1996	Bithufangi (Teledrama)	"E Zaharu Vi Hithuge Adin"	Ahmed Shakeeb	Solo	
1997	Huvafaiy	"Ishaaraaiykoh Balaalaanee"	Mausoom Shakir	Fazeela Amir	
1998	Ehan'dhaan	"Manzileh Dhuniyeyn Libeythoa"	Fathimath Nahula	Solo	
1998	Raalhubaani	"Bunebala Ladhuganefaa"	Mausoom Shakir	Fazeela Amir	
1998	Kulheybeybe	"Meehekey Nikamethi"	Fathimath Nahula	Solo	
1999	Maafkuraashey	"Jaadhoogar Dheythee Aniyaa"	Boi Ahmed Khaleel	Fazeela Amir	
1999	Liushaa (Teledrama)	"Saadhaa Mizaaju"	Boi Ahmed Khaleel	Rafiyath Rameeza	
2000	Dhoapatta	"Masthu Vevuney"		Solo	
2001	Aniyaa	"Khiyaaluga Foni Foni"	Mohamed Rasheed (Annaarey)	Fathimath Rauf	
2001	Dhanmaanu	"Dhin Javaabakun Mithuraa"	Kopee Mohamed Rasheed	Solo	
2001	Dhanmaanu	"Hunnanveehey Loabi Libeythoa"		Solo	
2003	Hiyy Edhey Raasthaa	"Yaaru Thiyey Mihithuge Shifaa"	Adam Haleem Adnan	Shifa Thaufeeq	
2003	Minvaru (Teledrama)	"Feenaashey Leykoarugaa"	Kopee Mohamed Rasheed	Solo	
2003	Raiy Finifenmaa	"Beynun Asaru Dheynuhey"	Adam Naseer Ibrahim	Shifa Thaufeeq	
2005	Vairoalhi Ahves Sirrun	"Manzileh Dhuniyeyn Libeythoa"	Fathimath Nahula	Solo	
2009	Mihithah Loabi Dheyshey	"Magey Reydhuvaa"	Boi Ahmed Khaleel	Shifa Thaufeeq	

=== Non-film songs ===
Year	Album/single	Song	Lyricist(s)	Co-artist(s)
1988	Inter-School Singing Competition 1988	"Iskuran Dhuniyein Vaaneyhe"		Solo
1990	Single	"Reythah Heydhavee"		Solo
1992	Single	"Malaa Thiya Maluge Sharafugaey"		Solo
1992	Single	"Maruviyyaa Sharafugaa Ma Maruvaanan"		Solo
1993	Feshun	"Mi Raajjeyge Saafu Vai"	Hussain Shihab	Solo
1993	Feshun	"Eki Eki Thanthan Dhekibalaa"	Abdulla Afeef	Solo
1993	Feshun	"Saafuveythoa Mi Javvaa Fazaa"		Solo
1993	Feshun	"Mee Enme Ufaaveri Aharey"		Hawwa Riyaza
1993	Feshun	"Raajjeyge Ufalaa Araamakee"		Aishath Rasheedha
1994	Aadheys	"Dhaashe Dhaashey Salaam"	Ahmed Shakeeb	Solo
1994	Aadheys	"E Zaharu Vi Hithuge Adin"	Ahmed Shakeeb	Solo
1995	Three Fingers	"Saafu Rivethi Kan'dufalhah"		Solo
1995	Rihirey	"Rihireythakun Dhinhaa"		Solo
1995	Rihirey	"Nasraa Naseebaa Libey"		Solo
1995	Rihirey	"Aan Ekey Nubuneehey"		Solo
1995	Rihirey	"Roashey Vee Adhu"		Solo
1995	Rihirey	"Minivan Amaankamakaa"		Solo
1995	Rihirey	"Aa Moonekey Thee Fenilaa"		Solo
1995	Rihirey	"Vaanehey Vakivedhaan"		Aishath Rasheedha
1995	Rihirey	"Hoadheemey Fenilaathoa Kalaa"		Aishath Rasheedha
1995	Rihirey	"Dhaan Huree E Saahilah"		Aishath Rasheedha
1995	Single	"Merey Loa Dhekey Hoonaa"	Kaneeru Abdul Raheem	Solo
1996	Fashuvi	"Bunebala Dhen Mey Thelhilaa"	Afeefa Ahmed	Shifa Thaufeeq
1996	Fashuvi	"Jaaney Dhoove Jaan"	Ahmed Sharumeel	Fazeela Amir, Ibrahim Amir, Rafiyath Rameeza
1996	Fiyavalhu	"Manzileh Dhuniyeyn Libeythoa"	Fathimath Nahula	Solo
1996	Maayoos	"Isve Vee Loabi En'geyneyhe"	Ahmed Shakeeb	Solo
1996	Maayoos	"Veynehhe Ufaa Hoadhun"	Ahmed Shakeeb	Solo
1996	Rasreethi	"Thadhu Hoonu Libey"		Solo
1996	Sahaaraa	"Neyngi Hithey Gendheveema"	Easa Shareef	Shifa Thaufeeq
1996	Sahaaraa	"Ufaavi Raasthaa Vee"	Easa Shareef	Solo
1996	Shakuwaa	"Karuna Naadheyhe"	Ahmed Shakeeb	Solo
1996	Shakuwaa	"Nindheeveethi Meymathee"	Ahmed Shakeeb	Solo
1996	Shakuwaa	"Dhanee Dhanee Merigen Loa" (Duet Version)	Ahmed Shakeeb	Aishath Inaya
1996	Shakuwaa	"Moodhaa Ufaa Vee"	Coco Hassan Haleem	Aishath Inaya
1996	Veyn	"Dheythee Hiley Zindhugaa"		Solo
1996	Veyn	"Hunnantha Vee Umurah Mihen"		Solo
1997	Asseyri	"Kiyaaladhee Kiyaaladhee"	Mausoom Shakir	Fazeela Amir
1997	Asseyri	"Vaareyga Veemey"		Aishath Inaya
1997	Eheege Adu	"Naaraa Han'dhaaey"	Easa Shareef	Solo
1997	Huvan'dhu	"Nufeni Kobaa"		Solo
1997	Huvan'dhu	"Dhin Khiyaalu Khiyaalu Theehey"		Shifa Thaufeeq
1997	Mathaaran	"Dheythoa Ehee Roathee Mihiyy"		Solo
1997	Mathaaran	"Nulibeynehey Alun Ehee"		Solo
1997	Mathaaran	"Thee Theeye Magey"	Afeefa Ahmed	Rafiyath Rameeza
1997	Raahi	"Khushaamidhu Kureemaa"	Kopee Mohamed Rasheed	Solo
1997	Ranthari	"Emoonun Beevaa Neyvaa Dhey"	Sofa Thaufeeq	Sofa Thaufeeq
1997	Ranthari	"Miee Adhu Naseebey"	Sofa Thaufeeq	Sofa Thaufeeq
1997	Roalhi	"Midhimaa Balaanuhey"	Mausoom Shakir	Fazeela Amir
1997	Roalhi	"Ishaaraaiykoh Balaalaanee"	Mausoom Shakir	Fazeela Amir
1997	Roalhi	"Rey Nidheegaaves Dhusheemey"	Mausoom Shakir	Fazeela Amir
1997	Roalhi	"Bunebala Ladhuganefaa Erey"	Mausoom Shakir	Fazeela Amir
1997	Roalhi	"Dhushun Edhuhuri Araamaa"	Mausoom Shakir	Solo
1997	Roalhi	"Farivefa Fonivefa Dhaathee"	Mausoom Shakir	Solo
1997	Roalhi	"Roifaa Kalaa Kurihaa Huvaa"	Mausoom Shakir	Solo
1997	Roalhi	"Faalhugaa Bunaanamey"	Mausoom Shakir	Solo
1997	Roalhi	"Kalaa Fenuneemaa Samaasaa"	Mausoom Shakir	Solo
1997	Roalhi	"Dhanee Dhanee Merigen Loa" (Male Version)	Mausoom Shakir	Solo
1997	Sarindhaa	"Beehi Beehilaashey Bunan"	Adam Abdul Rahuman	Solo
1997	Sarindhaa	"Bunee Vaaloabi Neyngeyhey"	Ahmed Sharumeel	Fazeela Amir
1997	Sarindhaa	"Edheveythee Adhu Hurevey" (Bonus Song)	Ahmed Sharumeel	Fazeela Amir
1997	Shabaab	"Dheefa Loabi Faalhugaa"	Ahmed Shakeeb	Fazeela Amir
1997	Shabaab	"Dhuniyeyn Netheehe Yaaruney"	Ahmed Shakeeb	Solo
1997	Shabaab	"Kobaa Kureege Huvaathah"	Ahmed Shakeeb	Solo
1997	Single	"Neyngumahvure Vakin"	Abdulla Sodhiq	Various Artists
1997	Single	"Heylamaa Mikamaa"		Freeze Band
1998	Arutha	"Ey Haadha Edhen"	Adam Haleem Adnan	Solo
1998	Arutha	"En'dheeyey Mey Thadhaa Hoonun"	Adam Haleem Adnan	Solo
1998	Dhanmaanu	"Finifenmalekey"		Solo
1998	Dhanmaanu	"Mee Furaanain Vevey Vaudhekey"		Solo
1998	Foni Karuna	"Haadha Reehchey Hiyy Dhevijjey"		Solo
1998	Foni Karuna	"Nunidheyne Dhanvaru"		Solo
1998	Furaana	"Reethee Heeleemaa"	Ahmed Shakeeb	Rafiyath Rameeza
1998	Furaana	"Hiyy Rovvaaladhin Farikamey"	Ahmed Shakeeb	Solo
1998	Furaana	"Ninjeh Lolah Naeehe Mirey"	Ahmed Shakeeb	Solo
1998	Furaana	"Oagaaveetheehey"	Ahmed Shakeeb	Solo
1998	Furaana	"Zaharey Thi Dhenee Hoadhaa"	Ahmed Shakeeb	Solo
1998	Furaana	"Hairaan Nuveyhey"	Easa Shareef	Solo
1998	Furaana	"Veynugaa Hunnan Mihaa"	Easa Shareef	Solo
1998	Furaana	"O O Hiyy Mi Jaanaa"	Easa Shareef	Solo
1998	Furaana	"Eynaa Mirey Dhimaavumun"	Ahmed Sharumeel	Solo
1998	Furaana	"Bune Roveneeyey Dhaneehey"	Mausoom Shakir	Solo
1998	Furaana	"Ladhun Dhurah Dhaathee"	Mausoom Shakir	Solo
1998	Furaana	"Hithugavaa Loabi Kiyaidhee"	Mausoom Shakir	Solo
1998	Furaana	"Hithugaavaa Han'dhaaneh"	Abdulla Haseen	Ibrahim Rameez
1998	Husnooraanee	"Dheyshey Oagaa"		Solo
1998	Hungaanu	"Ey Mirey Hiyy Vanee"		Solo
1998	Hungaanu	"Aniyaa Hithah Nudheyshey"		Solo
1998	Hungaanu	"Loabi Loabi Hashigan'dekey"		Rafiyath Rameeza
1998	Kuran'gi	"Dhey Han'dhaanakee"	Kaneeru Abdul Raheem	Zahiyya Thaufeeq
1998	Kuran'gi	"Thiya Thasleemu Nanmathee"	Sofa Thaufeeq	Solo
1998	Kurikeela	"Karunun Mi Dheloa Themi" (Bonus Song)	Kopee Mohamed Rasheed	Solo
1998	Kurikeela	"Dhin Javaabakun Mithaa" (Bonus Song)	Kopee Mohamed Rasheed	Solo
1998	Randhoadhi	"Seedhaa En'gi Huregen"	Easa Shareef	Solo
1998	Randhoadhi	"Vaanethoa Dhauru"		Solo
1998	Randhoadhi	"Moosun Bahaarey Ai Miyey Dhoa"		Fathimath Zoona
1998	Kalhirava	"Saadhaa Mizaaju"	Boi Ahmed Khaleel	Rafiyath Rameeza
1998	Kalhirava	"Kalhiravaehgaavaa Jaadhoohey"	Ahmed Sharumeel	Solo
1998	Kalhirava	"Dhimaaveythoa Ey Yaaraa"	Ahmed Sharumeel	Solo
1998	Kalhirava	"Aan Ey Hithaamain Mi Libey"	Adam Haleem Adnan	Solo
1998	Kalhirava	"Dhey Loabin Mey Furi"	Adam Haleem Adnan	Solo
1998	Kalhirava	"Heyo Haalugaa Kalaa"	Easa Shareef	Solo
1998	Kalhirava	"Dhookoh Ma Dhiyaimaa"	Easa Shareef	Solo
1998	Kalhirava	"Hithi Veynehgaa"	Easa Shareef	Solo
1998	Kalhirava	"Eyruge Fun Han'dhaan"	Easa Shareef	Solo
1998	Kalhirava	"Mi Dhehiyy Vaathee"	Mausoom Shakir	Solo
1998	Kalhirava	"Bune Roveneeyey Dhaneehey" (Remix Version)	Mausoom Shakir	Solo
1998	Kalhirava	"Theriyethi Raanee"	Mohamed Naseem	Solo
1998	Kalhirava	"Aishaa.. Aishaa"		Solo
1998	Sahaaraa 2	"Han'dhaanun Mi Khiyaalu Thakugaa"		Solo
1998	Sahaaraa 2	"Nethey Ufaa Dhuniyeyn"		Solo
1998	Thaureef	"Heelaafaa Nudhey Loabivaa"	Boi Ahmed Khaleel	Solo
1998	Thaureef	"Veevaru Bunan Fenilee Fahun"	Boi Ahmed Khaleel	Solo
1998	Vidhuvaru	"Miee Nunidhey Rey"		Zahiyya Thaufeeq
1998	Vidhuvaru	"Hiyy Hithaa Roaneyey"		Zahiyya Thaufeeq
1999	Adhaarasam	"Dhiyaimaa Loabi Mihithah Dheefaa"		Fazeela Amir
1999	Adhaarasam	"Fari Fari Moonu Balaalaanee"		Solo
1999	Endheyyo	"Hithugaa Mi An'dhaa Gineegaa"		Solo
1999	Endheyyo	"Aharen Mivaa Loaiybahtakaa"		Solo
1999	Endheyyo	"Baadee Fashun Dhoonyeh"		Solo
1999	Farumaan	"Gayaave Beley"		Solo
1999	Farumaan	"Zamaan Badhalve Mi Loabeegaa"		Solo
1999	Giritee	"Aavaa Han'dhaaney"	Boi Ahmed Khaleel	Fazeela Amir
1999	Giritee	"Ufaa Hithunney Dhanee"		Solo
1999	Giritee	"Thuraa Kamakah Viyas"		Solo
1999	Himeyn	"Maunavee Aalamun"	Easa Shareef	Rafiyath Rameeza
1999	Himeyn	"Heydhavey Gadi Heydhavey"	Easa Shareef	Rafiyath Rameeza
1999	Himeyn	"Loabivan Thiya Khiyaalu Kuran"	Easa Shareef	Rafiyath Rameeza
1999	Ishq	"Asthaa Dhee Maaf"		Solo
1999	Ishq	"Ihusaasu Vanee Hithuge Araamaai"	Adam Haleem Adnan	Solo
1999	Ishq	"Fahe Ishqakee Naseebey"	Adam Haleem Adnan	Solo
1999	Ithaa	"Kuraashey Hiyyheyo"		Solo
1999	Ithaa	"Maaiy Hoorekey Thee"		Solo
1999	Kasthoori	"Karuthaa Fenun Hoadhi"		Solo
1999	Kasthoori	"Hiyy Dhee Zuvaanaa"		Fazeela Amir
1999	Mahinooru	"Fun Zakham Naaruthakaa"	Kopee Mohamed Rasheed	Solo
1999	Mahinooru	"Wafaatherikan Uvaaleemaa"	Kopee Mohamed Rasheed	Solo
1999	Malakaa	"Heelathugaa Mulhi Umuru"		Solo
1999	Malakaa	"Dhefuraana Ekuvefaavaa"	Easa Shareef	Rafiyath Rameeza
1999	Muniyaa	"Kaainaathey Ekee Hairaan"	Easa Shareef	Solo
1999	Muniyaa	"Mithuraage Han'dhaan Mihithun"		Solo
1999	Muniyaa	"Hoadhaa Hoadhaa"		Shifa Thaufeeq
1999	Raaya	"Ran Ran Muthaa Muthaa"		Solo
1999	Raaya	"Mi Loabin Kiyaali Hithuge Mi Khabar"		Solo
1999	Raaya	"Heelun Fenna Chaaley"		Solo
1999	Rahmedhu	"Nudhaashey Magey Loabivaa"		Solo
1999	Rahmedhu	"Vindhaa Gulhaa Ley"	Ahmed Sharumeel	Fazeela Amir
1999	Rukkuri	"Kanulaa Ahaashey"	Boi Ahmed Khaleel	Solo
1999	Rukkuri	"Jaadhoogar Dheythee Aniyaa"	Boi Ahmed Khaleel	Fazeela Amir
1999	Shikaara	"Fari Fari Thiya Mithuruge"	Ahmed Shakeeb	Solo
1999	Shikaara	"Vee Nala Farikan"	Ahmed Shakeeb	Solo
1999	Shikaara	"Saafu Dhehitheh Gulheyney Goiy"	Ahmed Shakeeb	Solo
1999	Singaa	"Kaakuhe Loabi Haqeeqee Dheynee"		Solo
1999	Singaa	"Vaaloabin Engeemey"	Adam Haleem Adnan	Solo
1999	Vara	"Hussaribaihe Ahaalee"	Kopee Mohamed Rasheed	Solo
1999	Vara	"Mushun Dhemigenfiyey"	Kopee Mohamed Rasheed	Solo
1999	Single	"Thiyahen Nudhaashey Mithuraa"		Fazeela Amir
2000	Dhurumi	"Naseebu Aavelee"	Adam Haleem Adnan	Solo
2000	Dhurumi	"Naannaashey Huvafenthakugaa Mainaa"	Adam Haleem Adnan	Solo
2000	Bolirava	"Nudhaashey Gaathugaa Vaashey"		Solo
2000	Bolirava	"Nuhanu Reethi Sooraekey"		Solo
2000	BulBul	"Hithi Aniyaaey"	Adam Haleem Adnan	Solo
2000	BulBul	"Ey Vayaa Gendhaashey"		Solo
2000	BulBul	"Hithuge Raanee Vedheyshey"		Solo
2000	Dhoapattaa	"Edhey Magey Yaaraaey"		Solo
2000	Dhoapattaa	"Baakeevey Dheewaanaa"	Easa Shareef	Solo
2000	Endheri	"Khiyaal Veveythee Buneemey"		Solo
2000	Endheri	"Thiya Malugaavaa"	Adam Haleem Adnan	Solo
2000	Esfiya	"Gandhee Bunamey"		Solo
2000	Esfiya	"Haadha Dheyhiyy Veyey Loabin"	Boi Ahmed Khaleel	Solo
2000	Esfiya	"Haalu Kiyaadhenhey"	Boi Ahmed Khaleel	Fazeela Amir
2000	Goyye	"Malakaa Feni Pareenves"	Easa Shareef	Solo
2000	Goyye	"Lolakah Ninjeh Naadhey"	Easa Shareef	Solo
2000	Goyye	"Hiyy Miothee Dhey Hithun"		Solo
2000	Goyye	"Hithugaa Firumaa"		Solo
2000	Goyye	"Ban'daha Odin Goyye Aey"		Solo
2000	Goyye	"Reethi Mooney Thee"		Solo
2000	Goyye	"Rihireythakun Aavee"		Solo
2000	Goyye	"Loabeege Dhirumeh Netheemaa"		Solo
2000	Gumree	"Reetheege Raanee Ujaalaa"	Adam Haleem Adnan	Solo
2000	Gumree	"Kaakuthoa Huvaa Kuree"	Adam Haleem Adnan	Solo
2000	Gumree	"Hunnanveehey Loabi Libeythoa"		Solo
2000	Hamaroalhi	"Veynee Suvaalu Mihithugaa"	Kopee Mohamed Rasheed	Solo
2000	Hinithun	"Dhahinukuraashey"	Easa Shareef	Fathimath Zoona
2000	Hinithun	"Yaaraage Nan Hilaa"	Abdulla Hameed Fahumee	Solo
2000	Hissaa	"Kollee Magey Hiyy Halaaku"		Solo
2000	Hissaa	"Mi En'gi Faalhuga Kuri"		Solo
2000	Hiyala	"Heydhavaairu Reydhuvaa"		Solo
2000	Hiyala	"Heevey Netheyhen"		Solo
2000	Hiyala	"Gulaabee Maafulhu"		Solo
2000	Hulhevi Han'dhu	"Jehumun Mihaaru Ishqu"		Ruksaana Ilyas
2000	Hulhevi Han'dhu	"Dheewaanaavey Faalhuveleemaa"		Solo
2000	Inthihaa	"Abadhu Thiya Loabi"	Shifa Thaufeeq	Shifa Thaufeeq
2000	Inthihaa	"Haalaathaa Moosun"	Easa Shareef	Solo
2000	Karuna	"Fenunee Haadha Beynunvaa"		Rafiyath Rameeza
2000	Karuna	"Vaudheh Mirey Vaanan"	Easa Shareef	Rafiyath Rameeza
2000	Karuna	"Magey Haalu Bunedhen"	Easa Shareef	Solo
2000	Karuna	"Maazeevee Foni Dhaurun"	Easa Shareef	Solo
2000	Karuna	"Umurah Thiya Namugaa"	Easa Shareef	Solo
2000	Karuna	"Gasthugaa Kiyaadhemey"	Easa Shareef	Solo
2000	Karuna	"Erey Haadha Loabin"	Easa Shareef	Solo
2000	Karuna	"Lolun Ohorey E Koaru"		Solo
2000	Karuna	"Loabin Mihiyy Nurovvaa Kalaa"		Solo
2000	Karuna	"Ufalugaa Vun Adhaa"		Solo
2000	Karuna	"Han'dhuvaru Dheythoa Dhen"		Solo
2000	Karuna	"Kehidheefaa Dhaairu"		Solo
2000	Karuna	"Mihaalugaa Mihithaamain"		Solo
2000	Kathiriyaa	"Dhathuru Fesheemey"	Adam Haleem Adnan	Solo
2000	Kathiriyaa	"Yaqeeney Vaudhey Mee Kuraa"	Adam Haleem Adnan	Solo
2000	Kathiriyaa	"Dhehitheh Yaqeen Gulheynee"	Adam Haleem Adnan	Solo
2000	Khareef	"Dhongomaeh Fenunu Fahun" (Version 1)	Adam Haleem Adnan	Solo
2000	Khareef	"Dhongomaeh Fenunu Fahun" (Version 2)	Adam Haleem Adnan	Solo
2000	Khareef	"Feshee Dhathuru Mithuraa"	Firaaq	Solo
2000	Khareef	"Feshee Dhathuru Ma Kihaa"	Firaaq	Solo
2000	Khareef	"Dheewaanaa Kollaaney"		Solo
2000	Laat	"Yaqeen Nukurevey"	Abdulla Afeef	Solo
2000	Laat	"Ladhuvethi Moonu Badhaluvaaney"	Abdulla Afeef	Fathimath Zoona
2000	Maaburu	"Badhaluve Dhiya Gothun Haalathu"	Easa Shareef	Solo
2000	Maaburu	"Ran Loabi Mithuraa Gaathugaa"		Solo
2000	Moosum	"Veynugaa Kuramey Dhuaa"	Ahmed Sharumeel	Solo
2000	Mujuraa	"Loabeege Hayaathun"		Solo
2000	Muraka	"Dhusheemey Maleh Reethi Chaaloo"	Adam Haleem Adnan	Rafiyath Rameeza
2000	Muraka	"Hithuge Tharaanaa Dhen Ivvanhey"		Solo
2000	Namaves...	"Vaarey Vehen Fesheeyey"	Easa Shareef	Solo
2000	Namaves...	"Aalam Mirey Loabeegaa"	Easa Shareef	Fathimath Rauf
2000	Namaves...	"Mendhanveemaa Dhuniye Himeynvaaney"	Easa Shareef	Fathimath Rauf
2000	Neyvaa	"Loabivamey Buneleemaa"	Kopee Mohamed Rasheed	Solo
2000	Neyvaa	"Moonu Burugaa"	Kopee Mohamed Rasheed	Solo
2000	Neyvaa	"Keiynuvaaney Keiynuvaaney"	Kopee Mohamed Rasheed	Solo
2000	Nihaa	"Ithubaaruves Kuraahiyy Vey"	Easa Shareef	Solo
2000	Nihaa	"Loabeege Hadhiyaa"		Solo
2000	Nihaa	"Reyge Mendhan Vaan Fesheemaa"		Fathimath Rauf
2000	Rasrana	"Hoabavi Rasrana"	Adam Haleem Adnan	Solo
2000	Rasrana	"Moonekey Jaazubee"	Adam Haleem Adnan	Solo
2000	Rasrana	"Roavi Ishqunney"	Adam Haleem Adnan	Solo
2000	Rivethi	"Yaaru Theeyey Mihithuge Shifaa"	Adam Haleem Adnan	Shifa Thaufeeq
2000	Rivethi	"Nudhaashey Ekaniveri Kohfaa"	Kopee Mohamed Rasheed	Solo
2000	Rivethi	"Hoadhima Kula Ran Vidhaa Thoathaa"	Kopee Mohamed Rasheed	Solo
2000	Rukkuri II	"Saadhaa Thi Moonaa Lolaa"	Easa Shareef	Fathimath Zoona
2000	Rukkuri II	"Reethi Huskoh Aalamun"	Boi Ahmed Khaleel	Solo
2000	Theyonaashi	"Kiyavaa Nimumun"		Solo
2000	Theyonaashi	"Vari Kuraavaru Kameh Nuhin'giyas"		Solo
2000	Thoonu	"Loa Ninjah Magey Merifaa"	Mausoom Shakir	Solo
2000	Thoonu	"Govaalee Loabin"	Mausoom Shakir	Solo
2000	Single	"Vayaa Dhiyumun Nivaalaa"		Solo
2001	Aimina	"Khiyaaluga Foni Foni"	Mohamed Rasheed (Annaarey)	Fathimath Rauf
2001	Aimina	"Mithaan'ga Mihuree"	Mohamed Rasheed (Annaarey)	Solo
2001	Baaodi	"Ey Kiyaaladheebalaa"		Solo
2001	Baaodi	"Reethi Thasveeru Ekee"		Solo
2001	Baaodi	"Hoadhaaleemey"		Solo
2001	Boduraalhu	"Maakurin Vaudhu Veehey"		Solo
2001	Boduraalhu	"Neydheyne Hithaamaigaa"		Solo
2001	Fattaru	"Dheyshey Mihiree Jaanaa Hithaa"	Ismail Shakeeb	Solo
2001	Fattaru	"Aimaa Magey Aashiqaa"	Ismail Shakeeb	Solo
2001	Gulfaam	"Nuhoadhaa Loabivaaey"		Solo
2001	Gulfaam	"Jumboalaa"		Solo
2001	Haasil	"Ey Andhaleebu Chaalu"	Adam Haleem Adnan	Solo
2001	Haasil	"Eyru Dhinhaa E Loabi"		Solo
2001	Haasil	"Gandhee Bunanhey"		Solo
2001	Huvafen	"Masthee Hiyy Ahaashe Bunyey"	Adam Haleem Adnan	Fazeela Amir
2001	Huvafen	"Loabeege Kuranee Dhuaa Ey"	Adam Haleem Adnan	Solo
2001	Huvafen	"Faafaehthoae Haqeeqee Gothugaa"	Adam Naseer Ibrahim	Solo
2001	Kalaa	"Buneemey Mi Loabin"	Hamdhoon Hameed	Solo
2001	Kalaa	"Hiyy Ekaniverivaa Han'dhaanthah"		Solo
2001	Kalaa	"Dheythoa Dheythoa"		Solo
2001	Kan'bulo	"Kan'buloyah Loabi Dhinee"		Solo
2001	Kan'bulo	"Edhemey Aharen Mi Kan'bulo"		Solo
2001	Kan'bulo	"Hen'dhunaa Aharen Onnaaname"		Solo
2001	Kan'bulo	"Ey Keehvebaa"		Solo
2001	Kan'bulo	"Hiyy Magey Thelhenee Mirey"		Solo
2001	Kan'bulo	"Fun Khiyaalehgaa Guneythee"		Solo
2001	Kan'bulo	"Hamahimeyn Mi Bimugaa"	Easa Shareef	Solo
2001	Kan'bulo	"Heelaashey Chaaley Heelaashey"	Easa Shareef	Solo
2001	Mendhan	"Hoadhanee Hoadhanee"	Ahmed Shakeeb	Solo
2001	Mendhan	"Hiyy Nurovvaa"	Ahmed Shakeeb	Solo
2001	Mendhan	"Ey Mirey Udhaasthakun"	Ahmed Shakeeb	Solo
2001	Muthee	"Fidhaa Ma Veemey"		Solo
2001	Muthee	"Loabin Gulheynama Egothugaa"		Solo
2001	Muthee	"Muniyaage Loabin Ma Vejjey"	Adam Haleem Adnan	Solo
2001	Randhi	"Saabahoa Assaribahoa"	Roanu Hassan Manik	Solo
2001	Ranfaunu	"Dheewaanaa Mihira Vanee"	Boi Ahmed Khaleel	Solo
2001	Ranfaunu	"Hoadhan Nala E Bahaaru"		Fazeela Amir
2001	Reyfanaa	"Loabin Kalaa Dhekey Hiyyvey"		Solo
2001	Rukkuri III	"Masthu Vevuney"		Solo
2001	Rukkuri III	"Reythakey Fun Asaru"		Zuhura Waheed
2001	Sanaa	"Mithuraaey Vaaloabin"		Aminath Ibrahim
2001	Sanaa	"Kamanaa Raanee Muniyaa"	Adam Naseer Ibrahim	Solo
2001	Sanaa	"Isve Vee Loabi En'geyneyhe"	Ahmed Shakeeb	Solo
2001	Sanaa	"Veynehhe Ufaa Hoadhun"	Ahmed Shakeeb	Solo
2001	Tharaanaa	"Thaazaavi Folhey Malekey"	Adam Haleem Adnan	Solo
2001	Tharaanaa	"Loabeegaa Meeyey Aalaavaa Shuoor"	Adam Haleem Adnan	Solo
2001	Tharaanaa	"Ishqu Beynun Numevaa"	Adam Naseer Ibrahim	Solo
2002	Anaa	"Miee Loabibaaey"		Solo
2002	Anaa	"Bunanhey Kalaa"		Solo
2002	Anaa	"Thiya Loabivaage Loaiybah"		Solo
2002	Bonus	"Bune Roveneeyey Dhaneehey"	Mausoom Shakir	Solo
2002	Bonus	"Dhanee Dhanee Merigen Loa" (Male Version)	Mausoom Shakir	Solo
2002	Bonus	"Kalaa Fenuneemaa Samaasaa"	Mausoom Shakir	Solo
2002	Bonus	"Eyruge Fun Han'dhaan"	Easa Shareef	Solo
2002	Bonus	"Mithuraage Loabi Ran Han'dhaan"	Easa Shareef	Solo
2002	Bonus	"O O Hiyy Mi Jaanaa"	Easa Shareef	Solo
2002	Bonus	"Saadhaa Mooney Mooney Thee"	Easa Shareef	Solo
2002	Bonus	"Theriyethi Raanee"	Mohamed Naseem	Solo
2002	Bonus	"Hithugaavaa Han'dhaaneh"	Abdulla Haseen	Ibrahim Rameez
2002	Bonus	"Reethee Heeleemaa"	Ahmed Shakeeb	Rafiyath Rameeza
2002	Dhanvaru	"Foheveyneybaaey"	Ahmed Haleem	Solo
2002	Dhonmanje	"Cinderella"	Adam Haleem Adnan	Solo
2002	Dhonmanje	"Aazuvaan Moonekey"	Adam Haleem Adnan	Solo
2002	Dhonmanje	"Haadhahaavey Kuraahiyy Samaasaa"	Adam Haleem Adnan	Solo
2002	E'Kamanaa	"Ekamanaa"	Ahmed Nashid	Solo
2002	E'Kamanaa	"Han'dhuvaru Dhey Reyrey"	Ismail Mubarik	Shaheedha Riffath
2002	Eynaa	"Vindhu Loabin Jehi Hithehgaa" (Version 1)	Ahmed Falah	Solo
2002	Eynaa	"Maa Ladhun Ais Fenileemaa"		Solo
2002	Eynaa	"Loaiybeh Ma Vejjey"		Solo
2002	Fari Raanee	"Nafurathuvee Dhuniyeygaa"	Adam Haleem Adnan	Solo
2002	Fari Raanee	"Hoadheyey Edhi Hithugaa Vaathee"	Ahmed Haleem	Solo
2002	Fari Raanee	"Dheythoa Dheythoa"		Solo
2002	Foari	"Han'dhumavey Nala Nala"		Solo
2002	Foari	"Reehchey Haadhahaa Reehchey"		Solo
2002	Guraha	"Fari Reethi Maleh Folhumun"	Ahmed Shakeeb	Solo
2002	Guraha	"Saafu Mihiyy Badhunaamuve Dhaathee"	Ahmed Shakeeb	Solo
2002	Guraha	"Huvafen Dhekeynee"	Easa Shareef	Fazeela Amir
2002	Hithakah	"Vindhaa Leygaa"		Solo
2002	Hithakah	"Nikamethi Hithehge Fasaanaa"		Solo
2002	Hithakah	"Aadheys Kureemey Mithaa"		Solo
2002	Paruvaana	"Ey Loaiybaa Majuboorey"	Kaneeru Abdul Raheem	Solo
2002	Kashfu	"Ranmuthehhen Vidhiyakas"		Solo
2002	Kashfu	"Kan'bulo Mashaa Ruhenyaa"		Solo
2002	Kashfu	"Han'dhufadha Moonaa Dhelolaa"		Solo
2002	Keytha	"Rankolhaa Han'dhukeytha Hifumun"	Adam Haleem Adnan	Solo
2002	Keytha	"Inthizaarekey Neyngey Vevenee"		Solo
2002	Keytha	"Vasvaas Mihiyy Kuruvee"		Ibrahim Rameez, Freeze Band
2002	Keytha	"Here I Am"		Freeze Band
2002	Keytha	"Who Could Have Thought?"		Freeze Band
2002	Khanjaru	"Dhehiyy Fahtharuvee"	Adam Naseer Ibrahim (Poem Verse by Abdulla Sodhiq)	Shifa Thaufeeq
2002	Khanjaru	"Jahaa Thaara Dhekilabalaa"	Ahmed Nashid	Solo
2002	Leykokaa	"Jaadhoogaa Jassaifiyey"	Adam Haleem Adnan	Solo
2002	Leykokaa	"Dhusheemey Maleh Reethi Chaaloo"	Adam Haleem Adnan	Rafiyath Rameeza
2002	Lily	"Dheythee Aniyaa"		Solo
2002	Loabi	"Angel Eyes"	Karishma Khaleel	Solo
2002	Loabi	"Magey Reydhuvaa"	Boi Ahmed Khaleel	Shifa Thaufeeq
2002	Moahiru	"Insaafakee Kobaa"	Ahmed Nashid	Solo
2002	Moahiru	"Reygaa Nidhunu Hin'dhu"	Ahmed Nashid	Solo
2002	Moahiru	"Kaakuhey Loabivey Maa Kureegaa"	Coco Hassan Haleem	Solo
2002	Naash	"Haadha Loaiybey Haadha Nalayey"	Ahmed Nashid	Solo
2002	Naash	"Nidhaalumun Heeviyey"	Ahmed Nashid	Solo
2002	Nazaru	"Yaaraa Thiyey Chaalukan"		Solo
2002	Nazaru	"Shaahee Gomafulhu Fenumun"	Adam Haleem Adnan	Solo
2002	Oivaru	"Veynun Eyru Dhin"		Solo
2002	Oivaru	"Dheefaanuhey Edhey Loaiybaa"		Solo
2002	Raasthaa	"Edhihuri Kamakun"		Solo
2002	Raasthaa	"Maathah Farivaneeyey"		Hassan Ilham
2002	Raasthaa	"Hurihaa Kathun"		Various Artists
2002	Ran Han'dhu	"Bunedhenhey Adhu Hithugaavaa Thadhu"		Solo
2002	Ran Han'dhu	"Edhey Chaalu Thiyey"		Fathimath Zoona
2002	Reethi Abadhuves Reethi	"Dhaathan Balaigen"		Solo
2002	Reethi Abadhuves Reethi	"Kollee Farudhaa Nagaashey"		Solo
2002	Samaasa	"Jehilunve Mey Thelhey Goiyvey"	Abdulla Muaz Yoosuf	Shifa Thaufeeq
2002	Samaasa	"Neyngey Gothehvey"	Abdulla Muaz Yoosuf	Shifa Thaufeeq
2002	Samaasa	"Neyngi Vevey Ihusaaseh Miee"	Easa Shareef	Solo
2002	Thun'di	"Soora Qudhurathuge Ajaibehfadha"		Solo
2002	Thun'di	"Thihiree Thun'dimathee Thaaey"		Solo
2002	Vadhaau	"Eki Vaudhun Gulheyneyey"	Hamdhoon Hameed	Solo
2002	Vadhaau	"Thidhey Hiyyves"	Ahmed Nashid	Solo
2002	Vadhaau	"Isve Dhin Foni Loabi Kobaa"	Ahmed Nashid	Solo
2002	Vakivumuge Kurin	"Hoadhey Raanee Magey Thee"		Solo
2002	Vakivumuge Kurin	"Fari Fari Mithuraa"		Solo
2002	Vakivumuge Kurin	"Nan Reethi Gothugaa"		Solo
2002	Vaudhu	"Haadha Loabinney Hinithunvanee"	Easa Shareef	Solo
2002	Vaudhu	"Amaazakee Mihaaru"	Adam Haleem Adnan	Solo
2002	Vaudhu	"You Are My Soniya"	Adam Haleem Adnan	Fazeela Amir
2002	Vindhu	"Eki Eki Rey Mihen"		Solo
2002	Jazbaathu	"Kairiyah Kalaa Aima Vey Ufaa"	Mausoom Shakir	Shifa Thaufeeq
2002	Jazbaathu	"Hiyy Loabeegaa Fanaavaathee"	Adam Naseer Ibrahim	Solo
2002	Single	"Hiyy Edheythee Han'dhaanun Rovey"		Solo
2003	Fathevare	"Fiya Reethi Nalavi Muniyaa"	Ogaru Ibrahim Waheed	Solo
2003	Hiyy Roavarun	"Dheewaana Adhu Veeyey"		Solo
2003	Hiyy Roavarun	"Ehaa Reehchey Kalaa Bunamey"		Solo
2003	Inthizaarugai... (VCD)	"Kalaa Loabin Vee Hunnaashey"	Boi Ahmed Khaleel	Fathimath Zoona
2003	Jaadhoo	"Buneemey Mi Loabin" (Bonus Song)	Hamdhoon Hameed	Solo
2003	Maana	"Haalugaa Jassaifiyey"		Solo
2003	Maana	"Mariyaadhu Aavaa"		Solo
2003	Rama	"Maamaluge Haaru"		Solo
2003	Rama	"Han'dhuvaru Dhey Reyreyhen"		Solo
2003	Reehchey Thi Moonu	"Thaqudheerugaa Vaan Nethee"	Easa Shareef	Solo
2003	Single	"Nayaa Finifen Emaa Dhekelan"		Solo
2003	Single	"Yaaruge Nalakan"	Maumoon Abdul Gayoom	Ibrahim Rameez
2004	Fari Kan'bulo	"Mulhi Javvaa Hasthee Chaaloo"	Adam Haleem Adnan	Solo
2004	Ihusaas	"Loabeege Kan'dugaa Raalhaa"		Fathimath Zoona
2004	Mariyaadhu	"Yaaruney Keehvegen Hiyy"		Solo
2005	Hamahimeyn	"Aavedhaa Aavedhaa"	Ahmed Shakeeb	Solo
2005	Hamahimeyn	"Ishqugaa Veynee Udhaahun"		Solo
2005	Hamahimeyn	"Samaasaa Kuraathee"		Solo
2005	Maahiyaa	"Aavedhaa Aavedhaa" (Remix Version)	Ahmed Shakeeb	Solo
2005	Vaarey	"Inzaaruthaaey Thi Dhenee"	Adam Naseer Ibrahim	Solo
2005	Vaarey	"Maadhurunves En'gijjey Kalaa"	Adam Naseer Ibrahim	Solo
2005	Vaarey	"Loabiverin Kuraa Vaudhaa Huvaagaa"	Adam Naseer Ibrahim	Solo
2005	Vaarey	"Heelaa Ey Heelaa"		Solo
2005	Vaarey	"Kureegaa Loabivey Bunefaa"		Solo
2005	Vaarey	"Baiveriyaa Kuramey Han'dhaan"	Beyya Huhthu	Solo
2005	Vaarey	"Reethivejjey Kalaa"	Adam Haleem Adnan	Solo
2005	Vaarey	"Samaasaa Kuraathee" (Remix Version)		Solo
2006	Kisthee	"Ahaashe Raanee"	Adam Haleem Adnan	Solo
2009	Adhives... Loabivey	"Ahaashe Raanee" (Remix Version)	Adam Haleem Adnan	Solo
2009	Hiyy Dheebalaa 2	"Magey Reydhuvaa"	Boi Ahmed Khaleel	Shifa Thaufeeq
2009	Mi Dhehiyy Gulhuney	"Reetheege Raanee Ujaalaa"	Adam Haleem Adnan	Solo
2009	Roalhi – Remix	"Bunebala Ladhuganefaa Erey" (Remix Version)	Mausoom Shakir	Fazeela Amir
2009	Roalhi – Remix	"Rey Nidheegaaves Dhusheemey" (Remix Version)	Mausoom Shakir	Fazeela Amir
2009	Roalhi – Remix	"Ishaaraaiykoh Balaalaanee" (Remix Version)	Mausoom Shakir	Fazeela Amir
2009	Roalhi – Remix	"Midhimaa Balaanuhey" (Remix Version)	Mausoom Shakir	Fazeela Amir
2009	Roalhi – Remix	"Dhushun Edhihuri Araamaa" (Remix Version)	Mausoom Shakir	Solo
2009	Roalhi – Remix	"Farivefa Fonivefa" (Remix Version)	Mausoom Shakir	Solo
2009	Roalhi – Remix	"Faalhugaa Bunaanamey" (Remix Version)	Mausoom Shakir	Solo
2009	Roalhi – Remix	"Roifaa Kalaa" (Remix Version)	Mausoom Shakir	Solo

=== Religious / Madhaha ===
Year	Album/single	Madhaha	Lyricist(s)	Co-artist(s)
2000	Vinavi 1	"Thiyaey Rasoolakee"	Adam Haleem Adnan	Solo
2000	Vinavi 1	"Noorakee Enme Vidhaa"		Solo
2000	Vinavi 1	"Lavvaashiey Rahumaiy Mithaa"		Solo
2000	Vinavi 1	"Thaubaa Vamaa Hin'gaa"		Solo
2001	Vinavi 2	"Hamdhaa Sanaa Kiyamey"		Solo
2001	Vinavi 2	"Laaba Edhigen Hoadhamaahey"		Solo
2001	Vinavi 2	"Heylaashey Balaa"	Adam Naseer Ibrahim	Solo
2001	Vinavi 2	"Allah Akbar"	Adam Haleem Adnan	Solo
2002	Vinavi 3	"Yaa RasoolAllah"	Adam Haleem Adnan	Solo
2002	Vinavi 3	"Allah Akbar Kabeeraa"	Maumoon Abdul Gayoom	Solo
2002	Vinavi 3	"Laa Ilaaha IllAllah"	Adam Naseer Ibrahim	Solo
2002	Vinavi 3	"Yaa Zal Jalaalee"	Adam Naseer Ibrahim	Solo
2003	Nafsu	"Furaanaige Sirreh En'geyhey"	Adam Naseer Ibrahim	Various Artists
2003	Nafsu	"Fathihu Farivi Maathah"	Adam Naseer Ibrahim	Solo
2003	Nafsu	"Nikamethi Faqeerunnahtakaa"		Solo
2003	Nafsu	"Kudhinney Hey Araashey"		Solo
2003	Nafsu	"Salaamaiy Sihhathehgaa"	Adam Haleem Adnan	Solo
2005	Yaa Rabbanaa	"Allah Akbar Allah Akbar"	Ahmed Rifaau	Solo
2005	Yaa Rabbanaa	"Nuvamas Dhuvahuge Gadha Veynugaa"	Ahmed Rifaau	Solo
2005	Yaa Rabbanaa	"Yaa Rabbanaa"	Ahmed Rifaau	Solo
2005	Yaa Rabbanaa	"Fasdheefa En'buri Nudheybalaa"	Ahmed Rifaau	Solo
2005	Yaa Rabbanaa	"Maruhabaa Maaiy Muhammadh"	Ahmed Rifaau	Solo
2005	Yaa Rabbanaa	"Visnaalumah Edhemey"	Ahmed Rifaau	Solo
2005	Yaa Rabbanaa	"Heylaashe Ey Magey Akhaa"	Ahmed Rifaau	Solo
2005	Yaa Rabbanaa	"Ey Magey Lobuvethi Akhaa"	Ahmed Rifaau	Solo
2007	Ey Ukhthaa	"Hindhaamu Soora Lavvaa"	Abdulla Bin Mohamed	Solo
2007	Ey Ukhthaa	"Havaanafsah Thabaavaakah"	Abdulla Bin Mohamed	Solo
2007	Ey Ukhthaa	"Yaa Hayyu Yaa Qayyoomanaa"	Abdulla Bin Mohamed	Solo
2007	Ey Ukhthaa	"Bappa Dhey Heyohaa Naseyhaiy"	Mausoom Shakir	Solo
2007	Ey Ukhthaa	"Ukhthaayah Maaiy"	Mausoom Shakir	Solo
2007	Ey Ukhthaa	"Hithaamayaa Udhaahugaa"	Mausoom Shakir	Solo
2007	Ey Ukhthaa	"Visnaanulaa Eyru Ulhemun Dhiyaimaa"	Mausoom Shakir	Solo
2007	Ey Ukhthaa	"LabbaikAllah"	Adam Naseer Ibrahim	Solo
2007	Ey Ukhthaa	"Visnaashey Dhuniye Ah"	Adam Naseer Ibrahim	Solo
2007	Ey Ukhthaa	"Neelamehgaa Onna Finifenmaa"	Adam Naseer Ibrahim	Solo
2009	Naanaa	"Baajjaveri Dhe Kalima"		Zuha
2009	Naanaa	"Mi Alhaage Veri Ilaahu"		Azha
2009	Naanaa	"Mainbafainnah"		Loothu
2009	Naanaa	"Vaajibu Shukuru"		Alaa'u
2009	Naanaa	"Rahumathuge Nooru"		Balqish
2009	Naanaa	"Naanayoa Naanayoa"		Solo
2012	Furaavaru	"Kudakuda Dharifulhu Roalumun"	Ahmed Rifaau	Solo
2013	Thahaanee	"Salaamun Salaam"	Mohamed Amir Ahmed	Kids
2013	Thahaanee	"Eidhakun Mulhi Fazaa"	Mohamed Amir Ahmed	Kids
2013	Thahaanee	"Dhoonithah Udhuhen Feshee"	Adam Naseer Ibrahim	Kids
2013	Thahaanee	"Keevve Hemun Hinithunvanee"	Adam Naseer Ibrahim	Kids
2013	Thahaanee	"Maruhabaa Maruhabaa, Muslimunnah Eid Mubarak"	Adam Naseer Ibrahim	Kids
2013	Thahaanee	"Thahaanee, Thahaanee Kiyan"	Bin Janaab	Kids
2013	Thahaanee	"Vedhun Hifaigen Hemun"	Abdulla Afeef	Kids
2022	Single	"Maruhabaaey Dharumayaigen"		Solo
2023	Single	"Thiyaey Rasoolakee (Vocal Version)"	Adam Haleem Adnan	Solo
2024	Single	"Mendhamehge Ihusaas"	Adam Naseer Ibrahim	Solo
