= Mohamed Huzam =

Maldivian playback singer (1970–2022)

- Born: 23 May 1970; Dh. Hulhudheli, Maldives
- Died: 11 August 2022 (aged 52)
- Occupation: Playback singer
- Years active: 1993–2009
- Musical career
- Genres: Pop; filmi; electronic
- Instrument: Vocals

Mohamed Huzam (23 May 1970 – 11 August 2022) was a Maldivian playback singer.

== Career ==
In 1993, Huzam performed the song "Mulhi Jaan Hithaa" from the album Hiyani and later incorporated into the soundtrack album of Sitee (1993), which went on to become a breakthrough song for him which resulted in him having several music offers after its success. The same year, he sang the song "Loabi Maquboolu Nuvee" for the film Jazubaathu (1993), originating from the album Hiyani which fetched him the first Gaumee Film Award for Best Male Playback Singer. His next album Havaas (1997) was also loved by the audience. After the songs "Vilaathah Ehvanee Ey" and "Liyefaa Vamey Hithugaa Thinan" from the film Aan... Aharenves Loabivin (2002), he became inactive in the music scene though he was part of few studio albums released afterwards until the year 2006. After a gap of two years, Huzam was heard in the song "Loabin Kalaage Athugaa" from the album Loabi Vaathee (2009). In 2010, Huzam was bestowed with the Best Male Singer Award for the lullaby, "Dhonkan'bulo Nidhaalaashey" from the album Dhonkan'bulo (2001).

"Mausoom" from the film Amaanaaiy (1998), "Dhinee Zaharu Mithuraa" from Malakaa (1999), "Nayaa Farive Zeenaiyvee" from the album Gumree (2000), "Thadhaa Veynugaa" from the television drama Hulhukolhu (2000) and "Beynumey Ishqaa" from Neyvaa (2000) remain as some of his most popular releases in his career. Despite "disappearing" from the industry, many of his songs remain popular even after decades of their release. In 2018, Huzam was ranked second in the list of the "Most Desired Comeback Voices", compiled by Dho?. Aishath Maaha from the same publication opined that the "emotion and pain" in his voice has favoured him with the success in many of his releases.

Huzam died on 11 August 2022 after a long illness, whilst being treated abroad in India.

== Discography ==
=== Feature film ===
| Year | Title | Song | Lyricist(s) | Co-artist(s) | Notes |
|---|---|---|---|---|---|
| 1993 | Jazubaathu | "Loabi Maquboolu Nuvee" | Ibrahim Mansoor | Solo | Gaumee Film Award for Best Male Playback Singer |
| 1993 | Sitee | "Mulhi Jaan Hithaa" | Easa Shareef | Solo | |
| 1996 | Hifehettumeh Neiy Karuna | "Furee Hayaathuge Naa Neyngey" | Easa Shareef | Solo | |
| 1996 | Hifehettumeh Neiy Karuna | "Furaa Dhaathee Hin'gaa" | Mohamed Huzam | Solo | |
| 1996 | Hifehettumeh Neiy Karuna | "Rovey Haalu Karunain | Abdulla Sodhiq | Solo | |
| 1996 | Hifehettumeh Neiy Karuna | "Hiyy Magey Magey" | Abdulla Sodhiq | Mariyam Waheedha | |
| 1996 | Hifehettumeh Neiy Karuna | "Athulee Ey Hiyy Bunanee" | Abdulla Sodhiq | Mariyam Waheedha | |
| 1996 | Hifehettumeh Neiy Karuna | "Hiyy Vee Loabinney" | Abdulla Sodhiq | Mariyam Waheedha | |
| 1997 | Hinithun | "Adhu Netheethoa Ehee Asthaa" | Ibrahim Mansoor | Solo | |
| 1997 | Hinithun | "Meri Loa Ekee Nimeyney" | Shakeel | Solo | |
| 1998 | Sirru | "Lavvaandhey" | | Solo | |
| 1998 | Fahuneyvaa | "Ishaaraaiyhey Kuree" | Ahmed Haleem | Solo | |
| 1998 | Kuhveriya | "Yaaraa Ahaashey" | | Solo | |
| 1998 | Amaanaaiy | "Thuhthu Moonaa Dheloa" (Male Version) | Ahmed Sharumeel | Solo | |
| 1999 | Qurbaani | "Vidhaa Han'dhaa Tharithah" | | Solo | |
| 1999 | Qurbaani | "Reyrey Nunidhey" | | Solo | |
| 1999 | Qurbaani | "Hin'dhu Hin'dhukolhun Roveythee" | Easa Shareef | Solo | |
| 1999 | Umurah | "Loabi Libeythoa Jeheeme Salaan" (Bonus Song) | Adam Naseer Ibrahim | Solo | Appears in soundtrack |
| 1999 | Umurah | "Zuvaanaa Dhaneehe Zuvaanaa" (Bonus Song) | Ahmed Haleem | Solo | Appears in soundtrack |
| 2000 | Ainbehge Loabi Firiehge Vaajib | "Mibinmatheege Chaalu Han'dhey" | | Solo | |
| 2000 | Ainbehge Loabi Firiehge Vaajib | "Jismu Hibain Dhinee" | Ahmed Sharumeel | Shifa Thaufeeq | |
| 2000 | Hithu Vindhu | "Dhevenee Loabin" | | Solo | |
| 2000 | Maazee | "Manzileh Numevaa Musaafirekey" | | Solo | |
| 2001 | Aaah | "Oagaavee Heyo Hithakun" | | Shifa Thaufeeq | |
| 2001 | Hilihilaa | "Gaathugaa Hurumun" | Mohamed Huzam | Shifa Thaufeeq | |
| 2001 | Hiyy Heyokuraathi | "Zuvaanaa Dhaneehe Zuvaanaa" | Ahmed Haleem | Solo | |
| 2002 | Kahvalhah Dhaandhen | "Alivaa Alivaa Nooru" | | Fathimath Rauf | |
| 2002 | Aan... Aharenves Loabivin | "Liyefaa Vamey Hithugaa Thinan" | Mausoom Shakir | Fathimath Rauf | |
| 2002 | Aan... Aharenves Loabivin | "Vilaathah Ehvanee Ey" | Mausoom Shakir | Fazeela Amir | |
| 2009 | Baaraige Fas | "Loabin Kalaage Athugaa" | Adam Haleem Adnan | Aishath Inaya | Appears in Soundtrack album |

=== Short film ===
| Year | Film | Song | Lyricist(s) | Co-artist(s) |
|---|---|---|---|---|
| 2001 | Paree Dhahtha | "Veynee Sazaa" | Mohamed Huzam | Solo |

=== Television ===
| Year | Title | Song | Lyricist(s) | Co-artist(s) | Notes |
|---|---|---|---|---|---|
| 2000 | Hulhukolhu (Teledrama) | "Thadhaa Veynugaa" | Ahmed Shakeeb | Aishath Inaya | |
| 2000 | Dhoapatta | "Veyn Libeythee Ey" | Ahmed Shakeeb | Shifa Thaufeeq | |
| 2002 | Enme Kusheh (Teledrama) | "Meeyey Fariyaadhu" | | Aishath Inaya | |

=== Non-film songs ===
| Year | Album/single | Song | Lyricist(s) | Co-artist(s) |
|---|---|---|---|---|
| 1993 | Hiyani | "Loabi Maquboolu Nuvee" | Ibrahim Mansoor | Solo |
| 1993 | Hiyani | "Hoadha Ma Hoadhaa" | Ibrahim Mansoor | Solo |
| 1993 | Hiyani | "Roan Jehuneethee" | Ibrahim Mansoor | Solo |
| 1993 | Hiyani | "Adhu Netheethoa Ehee Asthaa" | Ibrahim Mansoor | Solo |
| 1993 | Hiyani | "Haalu Dhenneveemey" | Ibrahim Mansoor | Solo |
| 1993 | Hiyani | "Rankula Jehi Loabin" | Hussain Rasheed | Solo |
| 1993 | Hiyani | "Mulhi Jaan Hithaa" | Easa Shareef | Solo |
| 1993 | Hiyani | "Meri Loa Ekee Nimeyney" | Shakeel | Solo |
| 1993 | Hiyani | "Vaatheeve Hoadheyney" | Shakeel | Solo |
| 1993 | Hiyani | "Manzaru Badhalu Vedhaaney" | Kashimaa Ahmed Shakir | Solo |
| 1997 | Havaas | "Reyrey Nunidhey" | | Solo |
| 1997 | Havaas | "Vidhaa Han'dhaa Tharithah" | | Solo |
| 1997 | Havaas | "Yaaraa Ahaashey" | | Solo |
| 1997 | Havaas | "Isnagaa Bunamey Huvaa" | | Solo |
| 1997 | Havaas | "Aadheyhey Ivvaadhey Mee" | | Solo |
| 1997 | Havaas | "Hoorekey Vaahaa Fidhaa" | | Solo |
| 1997 | Havaas | "Iyye Eki Maley Dhushee" | | Solo |
| 1997 | Havaas | "Hiyy Magey Veynugaa Rovvaalee" | | Solo |
| 1997 | Havaas | "Thoonu Dhelolaa Rivethi" | | Solo |
| 1997 | Havaas | "Mibinmatheege Chaalu Han'dhey" | | Solo |
| 1997 | Single | "Neyngumahvure Vakin Dhera Kameh" | Abdulla Sodhiq | Various Artists |
| 1998 | Awara | "Oagaavee Heyo Hithakun" | | Shifa Thaufeeq |
| 1999 | Adhaarasam | "Chaaley Bunaaney" | | Fazeela Amir |
| 1999 | Endheyyo | "Dhevenee Loabin" | | Solo |
| 1999 | Fariyaadhu | "An'ha Loabivanyaa" | | Solo |
| 1999 | Fariyaadhu | "Dhin Mi Nazarugaa" | | Solo |
| 1999 | Fariyaadhu | "Eki Reyrey Dhin Dhathi Khiyaaley" | Beyya Huhthu | Solo |
| 1999 | Fariyaadhu | "Fari Fari Heelun" | | Solo |
| 1999 | Fariyaadhu | "Lailaa Lailaa" | | Solo |
| 1999 | Fariyaadhu | "Vindhey Oyaalaa Dhanee" | | Solo |
| 1999 | Farumaan | "Haadha Loabinney Hoadhee" | | Solo |
| 1999 | Ithaa | "Hiyy Edhey Varu" | | Solo |
| 1999 | Malakaa | "Nuvaanama Kalaa" | Easa Shareef | Shifa Thaufeeq |
| 1999 | Malakaa | "Dhinee Zaharu Mithuraa" | | Shifa Thaufeeq |
| 1999 | Malakaa | "Kalaa Vakivegen Dhaathee" | Ashraf Ali | Solo |
| 1999 | Shikaara | "Finikan Libunu E Thanmathee" | Ahmed Shakeeb | Solo |
| 1999 | Shikaara | "Roashey Jehenee" | Ahmed Shakeeb | Solo |
| 1999 | Shikaara | "Veyn Libeythee Ey" | Ahmed Shakeeb | Shifa Thaufeeq |
| 1999 | Vara | "Kannuve Nan Vaagothakun" | Kopee Mohamed Rasheed | Solo |
| 1999 | Vara | "Vakivee Loabin Reethi Gothugaa" | Kopee Mohamed Rasheed | Solo |
| 1999 | Vara | "Konme Kameh Kohfaa" | Kopee Mohamed Rasheed | Fathimath Rauf |
| 2000 | Dhurumi | "Bineemey Finifenmaa" | Adam Haleem Adnan | Solo |
| 2000 | Dhurumi | "Loabi Libeythoa Jeheeme Salaan" (Remix Version) | Adam Naseer Ibrahim | Solo |
| 2000 | Moosum | "Jismu Hibain Dhinee" | Ahmed Sharumeel | Shifa Thaufeeq |
| 2000 | Thoonu | "Nubune Dhiyaimaa Reyga Kalaa" | Mausoom Shakir | Fazeela Amir |
| 2000 | Thoonu | "Hiyy Hadhiyaa Kohfaa" | Mausoom Shakir | Fazeela Amir |
| 2000 | Thoonu | "Hiyy Thiya Loaiybah Edheneeyey" | Mausoom Shakir | Solo |
| 2000 | Thoonu | "Ivvaa Magey Haalu" | Mausoom Shakir | Solo |
| 2000 | Inthihaa | "Shikaaraehhe Mihithakee" | | Solo |
| 2000 | Namaves | "Vi Zakham Kiyaadhiniyyaa" | | Solo |
| 2000 | Namaves | "Thiya Folhunu Maley" | | Solo |
| 2000 | Namaves | "Konthaakubaa Ey Han'dhu Vanee" | Easa Shareef | Fathimath Rauf |
| 2000 | BulBul | "Hithuge Finikan Libey Loaiybakee" | Adam Haleem Adnan | Solo |
| 2000 | BulBul | "Hiyy Mathanuvey Raanee" | Adam Haleem Adnan | Solo |
| 2000 | Gumree | "Kalaa Aadheythoa Nunidhaa" | Mausoom Shakir | Fazeela Amir |
| 2000 | Gumree | "Nayaa Farive Zeenaiyvee" | Adam Haleem Adnan | Solo |
| 2000 | Kathiriyaa | "Aalaavedhaa Mee Han'dhaan" | Adam Haleem Adnan | Solo |
| 2000 | Kathiriyaa | "Dheykasheh Netheemey Hitheh" | Adam Haleem Adnan | Solo |
| 2000 | Khareef | "Loabeege Hithaamain Haasvefaa" | Adam Haleem Adnan | Solo |
| 2000 | Maaburu | "Veynee Loabin Dhey Sazaa" | | Solo |
| 2000 | Mujuraa | "Dhemey Hiyy Nagaafaa" | | Solo |
| 2000 | Neyvaa | "Vaarey Vehi Vehi" | Kopee Mohamed Rasheed | Solo |
| 2000 | Neyvaa | "Beynumey Ishqaa" | Kopee Mohamed Rasheed | Solo |
| 2000 | Nihaa | "Dheynanhey Loabi Mashah" | | Solo |
| 2000 | Rasrana | "Thelhey Mi Mey Mihithey" | | Solo |
| 2000 | Rivethi | "Hifaashe Vee Athugaa" | Kopee Mohamed Rasheed | Solo |
| 2000 | Single | "Neyngey Thiya Nan Mi Dhulun" | | Solo |
| 2001 | Boduraalhu | "Thadhaa Veynugaa" | Ahmed Shakeeb | Solo |
| 2001 | Dhonkan'bulo | "Dhonkan'bulo Nidhaalaashey" (Male Version) | Ameen Ibrahim | Solo |
| 2001 | Hiyaa | "Hoadhey Masthee Loabi" | Abdul Raoof | Solo |
| 2001 | Hiyaa | "Ishqee Nazarun Keehve Balanee" | Adam Haleem Adnan | Solo |
| 2001 | Hiyaa | "Kuramey Vedhun Qabooluhey" | Adam Haleem Adnan | Solo |
| 2001 | Hiyaa | "Fun Asaru Kurumun Dhehiyy" | Adam Haleem Adnan | Solo |
| 2001 | Hiyaa | "Kairin Govaalaahen" | Ameen Ibrahim | Solo |
| 2001 | Hiyaa | "Dhuniyeyn Mihaaru" | Ameen Ibrahim | Solo |
| 2001 | Hiyaa | "Vaathee Han'dhaan" | Mohamed Huzam | Solo |
| 2001 | Hiyaa | "Rihiveli Vodey Thun'di" | Mohamed Huzam | Solo |
| 2001 | Hiyaa | "Fari E Finifenmaa" | Mohamed Huzam | Solo |
| 2001 | Hiyaa | "Kurahaalamey Hurihaa Khiyaal" | Mohamed Huzam | Solo |
| 2001 | Hiyaa | "Meygaa Liyevifaa" | Kopee Mohamed Rasheed | Solo |
| 2001 | Hiyaa | "Beynumee Dhinumey Kalaa" | Adam Naseer Ibrahim | Solo |
| 2001 | Fattaru | "Kuraa Inthizaarakee Thee" | Ismail Shakeeb | Solo |
| 2001 | Fattaru | "Wafaatheri Vedheefaa" | Ismail Shakeeb | Solo |
| 2001 | Mendhan | "Gurahain Ali Fan'duvee" | Ashraf Ali | Solo |
| 2001 | Muthee | "Masthu Kuruvaafa Yaaru" | | Solo |
| 2001 | Muthee | "Thiyaee Hithuge Muthee" | Adam Haleem Adnan | Solo |
| 2001 | Muthee | "Ehaa Loabin Ekee Ulhunee" | Adam Naseer Ibrahim | Solo |
| 2001 | Tharaanaa | "Hithuge Yaaraa Kuraashey Ithubaaru" | Adam Haleem Adnan | Shifa Thaufeeq |
| 2001 | Tharaanaa | "Migothah Mihen Fenidheni Vanyaa" | Adam Naseer Ibrahim | Solo |
| 2001 | Shoakh | "Chaalee Eynaa Nan Kureveyhaa" | Ismail Abdul Qadhir | Solo |
| 2001 | Single | "Mala Fenuneemaa" | | Solo |
| 2002 | Paruvaana | "Gaathugaa Hurumun" | Mohamed Huzam | Shifa Thaufeeq |
| 2002 | Guraha | "Bahdhalu Kalaa Kuree" | Ahmed Shakeeb | Solo |
| 2002 | Guraha | "Aadhey Yaaraa Ey" | Ahmed Shakeeb | Solo |
| 2002 | Guraha | "Loabeege Moosun Aimaa" | Ahmed Shakeeb | Solo |
| 2002 | Kashfu | "Loabin Gulhey Dhehitheh Safun" | Adam Saleem | Solo |
| 2002 | Kashfu | "Moonu Thee Hiyy Edhey" | Adam Haleem Adnan | Shifa Thaufeeq |
| 2002 | Khanjaru | "Kushakaai Hure" | Yoosuf Mohamedfulhu | Solo |
| 2004 | Ihusaas | "Bunelabalaashey Loabivaa" | | Fathimath Zoona |
| 2004 | Mariyaadhu | "Dheyshey Jaan" | | Fathimath Zoona |
| 2004 | Ithubaaru | "Kohfaa Ufaa Ekugaa" | Abdulla Muaz Yoosuf | Solo |
| 2004 | Ithubaaru | "Moosun Badhalu Vaneeyey" | | Solo |
| 2004 | Saahil | "Malaa E Malaa" | | Solo |
| 2004 | Ehan'dhaanugai... | "Kalaage Asaruga Adhu Nimigen" | | Solo |
| 2005 | Qaumee Dhuvas 1426 | "Eheree Dhivehi Nishaan" | Maumoon Abdul Gayoom | Aishath Inaya, Hussain Ali, Ahmed Athif |
| 2005 | Fari Goma | "Han'dhuvaru Dhey Mi Nala" | | Fathimath Zoona |
| 2005 | Fari Goma | "Thaqudheerugaa" | | Fathimath Zoona |
| 2005 | Fari Goma | "Neyngeyhey Heeleemaa" | Adam Haleem Adnan | Fazeela Amir |
| 2005 | Dhilaasaa | "Dhookurey Mi Athun" | | Shaheedha Mohamed |
| 2005 | Dhilaasaa | "Alathu Loabi Asthaa" | Adam Haleem Adnan | Fathimath Zoona |
| 2005 | Leyfavethi | "Ninjey Nagaalee" | Amir Saleem | Solo |
| 2005 | Bingaa | "Dhuniyeyge Mee Qaanoonakee" | | Solo |
| 2005 | Bingaa | "Nikume Fathihu Hunna Gothun" | | Solo |
| 2006 | Mihithun | "Vaudhaa Huvaa Mee Kuraa" | Adam Haleem Adnan | Shifa Thaufeeq |
| 2006 | Mihithun | "Roalhi Jehilaa Gothun" | Hafsa Ali | Fathimath Rauf |

== Accolades ==
| Year | Award | Category | Nominated work | Result | Ref(s) |
|---|---|---|---|---|---|
| 1995 | 1st Gaumee Film Awards | Best Male Playback Singer | "Loabi Maquboolu Nuvee" – Jazubaathu | Won | |
| 2010 | Maldives Video Music Awards | Best Male Singer | "Dhonkan'bulo Nidhaalaashey" – Dhonkan'bulo | Won | |
