= Mariyam Nazima =

Maldivian film actress

Mariyam Nazima is a Maldivian film actress.

== Early life ==
Mariyam Nazima was born in Male', Maldives. She made her screen debut with an advertisement. Afterwards, she was seen in the video single, "Fennaathee Balanyaa Loabin" directed by Abdulla Shujau and featuring the fitness model, Abdulla, alongside her.

== Career ==
Nazima made her film debut as a confused lover in the Easa Shareef-directed Emme Fahu Dhuvas (2000), starring alongside Reeko Moosa Manik, Hassan Afeef and Niuma Mohamed in which a devious woman sunders her best-friend's upcoming marriage by creating false accusations and staging misleading impressions. She next starred in Mohamed Ali Manik's Maazee (2000) alongside Ismail Wajeeh, Jamsheedha Ahmed and Aminath Rasheedha which narrates the story of two best friends, a boy and a girl, who get separated at childhood and reunite as adults. Nazima played the role of Sama, a secretary who is romantically linked to her boss. Mariyam Shauqee's widely acclaimed family drama television series Kahthiri was released the following year, where she played the role of the tolerable second wife, living in a congested housing complex while dealing with several social issues.

In 2000, Nazima starred alongside Ahmed Asim, Koyya Hassan Manik and Waleedha Waleed in the Haajara Abdul Kareem-directed Ajaaib which depicts the relationship of two exemplary wives and their respective families regardless of societal norms. The following year, she starred as Nathasha, longing for her unrequited love in Fathimath Nahula's drama film Naaummeedhu (2000) which depicts the story of a happily married couple whose life is shattered into pieces when they unintentionally invite a seductive woman into their life. The film received favorable reviews from critics and emerged as the highest grossing Maldivian film of the year.

It was followed by her role as a money-driven greedy woman alongside Yoosuf Shafeeu, Mariyam Nisha, Moosa Zakariyya and Ahmed Shimau in the Shimau-directed family drama film Loabi Nuvevununama (2002). Penned by Fathimath Nahula, the story narrates the journey of a handicapped man who has been betrayed in love and unknowingly marries his brother's love interest. The film was a critical and commercial success. She next starred opposite Yoosuf Shafeeu and Ali Seezan as a young woman who reluctantly marries a handicapped man, in Mohamed Rasheed's Hithu Vindhu (2002). The following year, she played a supporting role in the Imad Ismail-directed horror film Araamagu Dhonkamana (2003) as a mentally challenged young woman, co-starring Mariyam Shazna, Assadh Shareef and Mohamed Afrah. The film narrates the story of a woman spirit who rises from the sea and marries a toddy extractor, disguised as a human being.

== Filmography ==
=== Feature Film ===
Year	Title	Role	Notes	Ref(s)
2000	Emme Fahu Dhuvas	Haseena		
2000	Maazee	Sama		
2000	Ajaaib	Sama		
2000	Saahibaa	Aminath Fiyaza		
2001	Hilihilaa	Lailaa / Nazla		
2001	Naaummeedhu	Nathasha	Special appearance	
2002	Loabi Nuvevununama	Nasma		
2002	Hithu Vindhu	Raufa		
2003	Araamagu Dhonkamana	Faathuma		

=== Television ===
Year	Title	Role	Notes	Ref(s)
1999	Kahthiri	Areesha	Recurring role; 17 episodes	
1999	3023		Main role	
1999–2000	Maafkuraashey	Nazima	Main role; 6 episodes	
2000	Reysham	Jeelan	Recurring role; 5 episodes	
2001	Konme Fiyavalhehves	Rishmee	Main role	
