= Hithu Vindhu =

- Official film poster
- Directed by: Mohamed Rasheed
- Written by: Mariyam Moosa
- Screenplay by: Mohamed Rasheed
- Produced by: Hussain Adil
- Starring: Ali Seezan; Mariyam Nazima; Yoosuf Shafeeu
- Cinematography: Ibrahim Wisan; Amir; Hussain Adil
- Edited by: Mohamed Rasheed; Hussain Adil
- Music by: Rashad
- Production company: Picture Land
- Release date: 2002
- Country: Maldives
- Language: Dhivehi

Hithu Vindhu is a 2002 Maldivian drama film directed by Mohamed Rasheed. Produced by Hussain Adil under Picture Land, the film stars Ali Seezan, Mariyam Nazima and Yoosuf Shafeeu in pivotal roles.

== Plot ==
In a desperate attempt of having a girlfriend, Riyaz (Yoosuf Shafeeu) proposes to his crush, Raufa (Mariyam Nazima) who spurned his proposal. Few minutes later, he eavesdrops a conversation of Raufa with her friend Nisha (Sajuna Ahmed) unveiling Nisha's affection towards Riyaz while Raufa has been in love with Riyaz's younger brother Rilwan (Ibrahim Wisan) though Riyaz and his handicapped friend, Aswad (Ali Seezan) is after her. He instantly proposes Nisha and ask her to marry him. When Nisha was nine months pregnant, she slips off the staircase and dies though she gives birth to a baby boy.

Meanwhile, Aswad's sister Ishaanee who was romantically linked up with Rilwan ends her relationship with him when he mocks her disabled brother. She soon finds comfort in the new recruit of her office, Rizwee (Dhaas). Rizwee and Ishan marries and things start falling apart when Rizwee starts coming home late and abuses his wife physically. As days pass by, their relationship grew stronger and they moved closer to each other.

Aswad's mother requests Raufa to marry her son Aswad. Out of generosity for the help she acquired from them, she reluctantly agrees to the wedding. However, he fails to fulfill her desires due to his physical incapability, dissatisfying Raufa. After a tedious honeymoon, Aswad believes that he is dejected by her love though he earns her sympathy. The society teases Raufa, accusing her that she married Aswad solely for money. Unable to bear the pain, she tries to commit suicide by taking non-prescribed medicines. He stays all night besides her taking care of her, which made Raufa realizes his love towards her. He suddenly falls ill and was surprisingly diagnosed with cancer.

Aswad refused to take any treatment since he believes there is no cure for the disease. Also, he requested the doctor to conceal the truth from his family. Raufa confesses her love for him and their relationship became more secure as time flies. Few months later, Aswad dies fighting for cancer while Raufa gives birth to a boy.

== Cast ==
- Ali Seezan as Aswad
- Mariyam Nazima as Raufa
- Yoosuf Shafeeu as Riyaz
- Ibrahim Wisan as Rilwan
- Fathimath Shazna as Nisha
- Ibrahim Giyas as Rizwee
- Sithi Fulhu as Kadhee

== Soundtrack ==
Track listing
No.	Title	Lyrics	Singer(s)	Length
1.	"Loabin Hoadhan Erey"		Mukhthar Adam, Aishath Inaya	4:57
2.	"Fennaane Heevey Maraa Loa"	Ahmed Sharumeel	Fazeela Amir, Ibrahim Amir	7:23
3.	"Haalu Kiyaa Dhenhey"	Boi Ahmed Khaleel	Ali Rameez, Fazeela Amir	5:04
4.	"Dhevenee Loabin"		Mohamed Huzam	3:25
5.	"Haadha Dheyhiy Veyey Loabin"	Boi Ahmed Khaleel	Ali Rameez	4:36
