= Kaashidhoo (Kaafu Atoll) =

Island in Kaafu Atoll, Maldives

Kaashidhoo ކާށިދޫ
- Inhabited island

- Location in Maldives
- Coordinates: 04°57′20″N 73°27′53″E
- Country: Maldives
- Administrative atoll: Kaafu Atoll
- Distance to Male: 86.42 km (53.70 mi)

Dimensions
  - Length: 2.825 km (1.755 mi)
  - Width: 1.025 km (0.637 mi)

Population (2022)
  - Total: 2,528 (including foreigners)
- Time zone: UTC+05:00 (MST)

Kaashidhoo (Dhivehi: ކާށިދޫ) is one of the inhabited islands of Kaafu Atoll, Maldives.

Kaashidhoo is an island to the north of North Male Atoll. In fact, this is mini-atoll with its own lagoon. The island is large, while the village occupies only a small part of it

== History ==
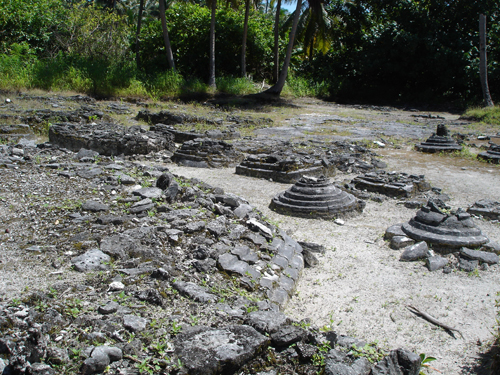
The remains of ancient Buddhist temples (Kuruhinna Tharaagandu) on the island of Kaashidhoo

In the first millennium AD, Buddhist culture was established in the Maldives. The earliest archeological evidence of human activity at Kaashidhoo is of a Buddhist monastery complex that has been dated between 205 and 560 AD, based on radiocarbon dating of shell deposits taken from the foundations of multiple structures. A Chinese bronze coin was found at the Kaashidhoo excavation site, which was found to be a 10th-century cash-coin from the Northern Song dynasty of Emperor T'ai Tsung. Trade occurred with India and China, followed by a rise in trade with Persian and Arab merchants during the period of 850 to 1150 AD. The excavation project at Kaashidhoo focused on conserving the area for research and to help protect the site from erosion and weathering. Since the site is built almost entirely of coral stone, the conservation work is essential to making sure that generations of Maldivians can continue to view this important site.

== Geography ==
The island is 86.42 km (54 mi; 47 nmi) north of the country's capital, Malé.

Kaashidhoo is included in the Malé Atoll. However, it is an atoll by itself geographically. For the ease of administration, the island is placed under Kaafu Atoll.

=== Kaashidhoo Kandu ===
The Kaashidu Kandu, also known as Kardiva Channel, is the broad channel separating some of the central atolls of Maldives.

== Demography ==
Historical population
Year	Pop.	±%
2006	1,696	—
2014	1,728	+1.9%
2022	2,528	+46.3%
2006-2022: Census populations Source:

== See also ==
- Kaashidhoo Bodu Kandu
- Kaashidhoo Kuda Kandu
- Kuruhinna Tharaagandu
