= Fauziyya Hassan =

Maldivian film actress (1942–2022)

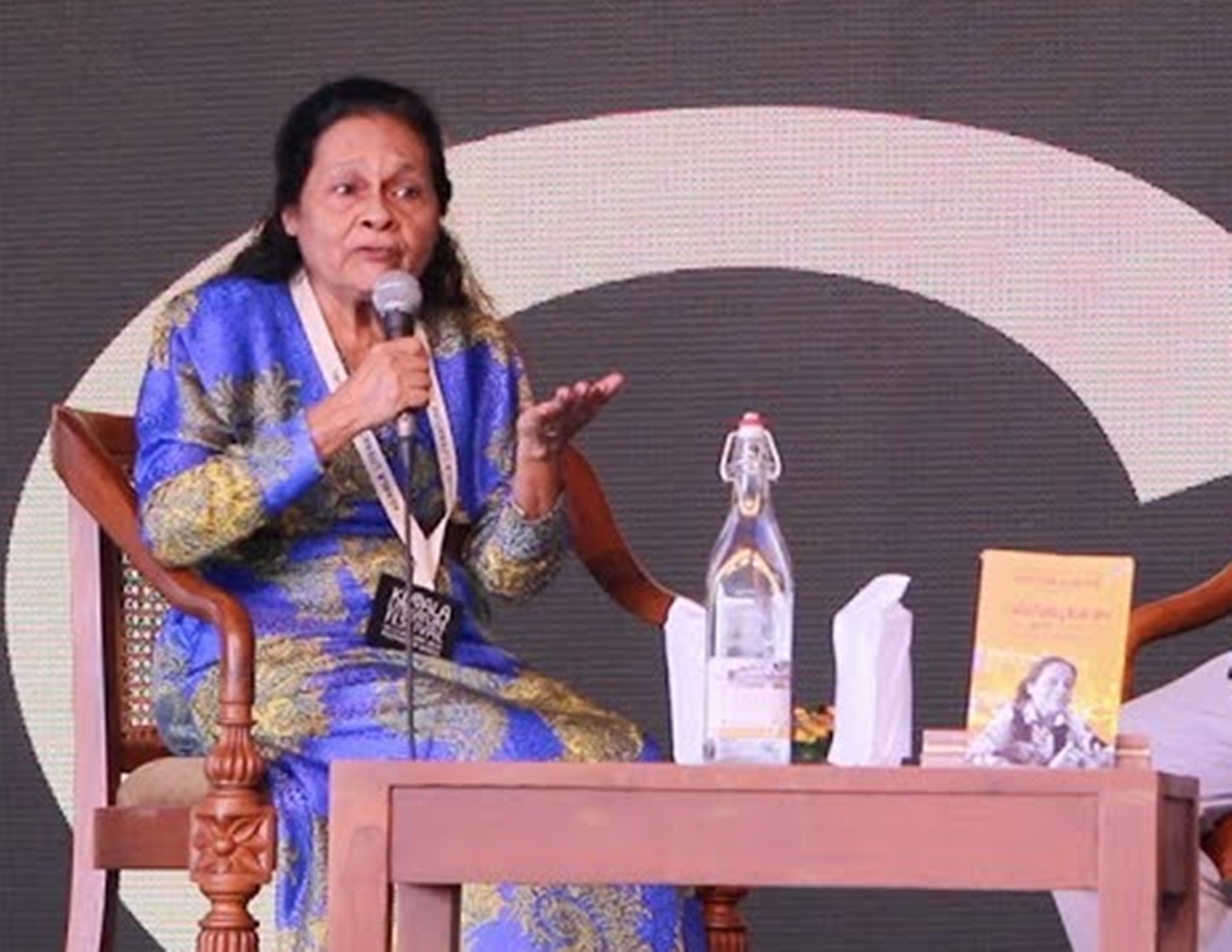
- Born: 8 January 1942; Malé, Sultanate of the Maldives
- Died: 31 August 2022 (aged 80); Colombo, Sri Lanka
- Occupation: Actress
- Years active: 1985–2022

Fauziyya Hassan (8 January 1942 – 31 August 2022) was a Maldivian film actress. She made her film debut in Sidha in 1985. In 1994 she was arrested by the Indian police on espionage charges relating to the Indian Space Research Organisation. She and a friend were accused of passing sensitive defence information to Pakistan. The espionage case against Hassan was not proven and eventually other charges were dropped, though she spent three years in prison under the National Security Act.

After her release Hassan appeared in a number of television dramas and films, including a run of horror films in the early 2000s. She afterwards appeared in a number of romantic dramas including Vaaloabi Engeynama, for which she was nominated for best supporting actress at the 2008 Gaumee Film Awards. Hassan took a break from acting between 2012 and 2019, before appearing in romantic drama Hahdhu, her performance in which was nominated in the best supporting actress category at the 2019 Gaumee Film Awards. Her final films were 2018 horror Reyvumun and 2021 drama Faree. She died in Sri Lanka in 2022 while undergoing medical treatment.

== Early life ==
Fauziyya Hassan was born on 8 January 1942 in Malé. At the age of seven, Hassan started growing interest towards the cinema and desired to be featured in a film though she was more fond of sewing. She self-learnt to sew clothes at the age of fourteen and expanded further with the skill. After attending Colombo Polytechnic in Sri Lanka, she became a clerk in the Maldivian Ministry of Foreign Affairs in 1957, and later worked as a censoring officer at the National Film Censor Board of Maldives.

== Career ==
Hassan made her film debut with Sidha (1985) and caught the attention of film-makers.

In 1998, she played the role of a heart patient and mother of Fayaz, an ignorant husband who is deeply in love with a patient suffering from congenital heart disease in Abdul Faththaah's television drama series Dhoapatta (2000). Starring alongside Mohamed Shavin, Jamsheedha Ahmed, Sheela Najeeb and Niuma Mohamed, the series centers on unrequited love and complications of a relationship within and beyond marriage.

In 2000, Hassan played the mother of a college boy who helps to reunite her son with his best friend after ages, in Hussain Adil's romance Hiyy Halaaku. The plot combines two love triangles set years apart. The first half covers friends on a college campus, while the second tells the story of a widower's young daughter who tries to reunite her dad with his old friend. The film was an unofficial remake of Karan Johar's romantic drama film Kuch Kuch Hota Hai (1998) starring Shah Rukh Khan, Kajol and Rani Mukerji in the lead role. Also, she starred opposite Reeko Moosa Manik, Hassan Afeef, Niuma Mohamed and Mariyam Nazima in Easa Shareef-directed Emme Fahu Dhuvas (2000) which follows a devious woman who sunders her best-friend's upcoming marriage by creating false accusation and staging misleading impressions. This was followed by the Ali Musthafa-directed Umurah (1999) opposite Jamsheedha Ahmed and Reeko Moosa Manik.

The following year she played the role of an old woman who is being mistreated by her own daughter in Abdul Faththaah's directorial debut, Himeyn Dhuniye which received positive reviews from critics. The same year, she starred opposite Reeko Moosa Manik and Jamsheedha Ahmed in the Easa Shareef-directed romantic horror film 2000 Vana Ufan Dhuvas (2000), in which she portrays the role of a helpless servant.

=== 2003–05: Horror films ===
Hassan collaborated with Amjad Ibrahim for his romantic horror film Dhonkamana (2003) which depicts the romantic relationship between a young man (played by Yoosuf Shafeeu) and an old woman (played by Hassan). Featuring Yoosuf Shafeeu, Sheela Najeeb, Niuma Mohamed, Sheereen Abdul Wahid, Amira Ismail and Aminath Rasheedha, the film received mainly negative reviews from critics though its inclusion of the theme portraying the relationship between a couple with a large age gap was praised.

In 2004, Hassan played a brief role of a caring widowed mother in Abdul Faththaah's horror film Eynaa (2004), in which appear Sheela Najeeb, Mohamed Manik, Ahmed Shah, Khadheeja Ibrahim Didi, Ibrahim Jihad and Nashidha Mohamed as six colleagues who go on a picnic to a haunted uninhabited island and their battle for survival. The film garnered critical appreciation specially for its technical department and was a commercial success. She next starred as the mother of an obsessive fangirl in Amjad Ibrahim's next directorial venture Sandhuravirey 2 (2004); a sequel to his 2002 horror film Sandhuravirey which presented Yoosuf Shafeeu and Mariyam Nisha in lead roles. Starring additional cast including Niuma Mohamed, Zeenath Abbas, Mohamed Shavin and Sheereen Abdul Wahid, the film follows a storyline of a daughter jinn avenging the death of its mother and sister on Dhiyash's family. Similar to its prequel, the film received negative response from critics.

The next year, Hassan starred alongside Niuma Mohamed, Ali Seezan and Sheereen Abdul Wahid in Ahmed Nimal's horror film Handhu Keytha (2005) which unfolds the story of a man who was enchanted by a spirit while witnessing a lunar eclipse. In the film, she played the mother of a loyal wife who has been tormented by the spirit. She next appeared in a brief role as the mother of a mystified man who has been detested by his crush in Abdul Faththaah's critically praised romantic film Vehey Vaarey Therein (2003). Featuring Yoosuf Shafeeu, Jamsheedha Ahmed, Khadheeja Ibrahim Didi, Mohamed Shavin, Amira Ismail and Aminath Rasheedha in crucial roles, the film narrates the story of unrequited love, and proved to be one of the highest-grossing Maldivian films of the year. The same year, Hassan reunited with Abdul Faththaah for his romantic disaster film, Hureemey Inthizaarugaa (2005) cast along with Ravee Farooq, Mariyam Zuhura, Waleedha Waleed, Ibrahim Jihad and Neena Saleem. The film, heavily relied on the effect of the 2004 Indian Ocean earthquake on the Maldives, received favorable reviews from critics though it failed to perform financially. Hassan played the mother of Reena, who has been traumatized by the events that lead to a big loss in her family.

=== 2006–11: Vaaloabi Engeynama and acclaimed roles ===
In April 2006, Ahmed Nimal's revenge thriller film, Hiyani was released which featured her as the mother of Shaina, a devoted wife who seeks comfort in the company of her husband's kidnapper. The film which primarily focuses on a wealthy troublesome couple whose possessions have been exposed by the disappearance of the husband, was mostly received positively by the critics. Her next release, Ahmed Nimal's romantic film Vaaloabi Engeynama (2006), starred alongside Yoosuf Shafeeu, Mariyam Afeefa and Fathimath Fareela was a critical and commercial success, considered to be the most successful Maldivian release of the year. Her performance as the mother of a conflicted husband struggling to convey equal affection towards his two wives garnered her a Gaumee Film Award nomination as the Best Supporting Actress.

In 2008, Hassan appeared as the helpless mother in Fathimath Nahula's romantic drama film, Yoosuf which depicts the story of a deaf and mute man (played by Yoosuf Shafeeu) who has been mistreated by a wealthy family, mocking his disability. Featuring an ensemble cast including Yoosuf Shafeeu, Niuma Mohamed, Sheela Najeeb, Ahmed Nimal, Mohamed Manik, Ravee Farooq, Zeenath Abbas and Ahmed Lais Asim, the film is considered to include most prominent faces in a Maldivian film. The film received widespread critical acclaim and has attained a blockbuster status at box office. A total of forty five housefull shows were screened at Olympus Cinema before the film was leaked online, however the producers were able to screen five more shows at the cinema making it one of the Maldivian all-time highest-grossing movies. The film was Maldivian official entry at 2009 SAARC Film Festivals and holds the privilege of being the opening movie of the festival.

In 2009, Hassan starred as the unsympathetic mother who verbally abuses her son-in-law in Loaiybahtakaa which was written and directed by Yoosuf Shafeeu. The romantic drama, co-starring Shafeeu, Sheela Najeeb, Fathimath Fareela and Mohamed Faisal, tells the story of unrequited love, and proved to be a commercial success. In her last release of the year, Hassan starred alongside Ali Seezan, Niuma Mohamed and Nadhiya Hassan as a maid in Seezan's melodrama Karuna Vee Beyvafa (2009). The film follows a downfall of a happily married couple on realizing the wife's infertility and destruction of their relationship with the invasion of a second wife.

Hassan's first release of 2010 was Abdul Fahtah's horror film Jinni alongside Ali Seezan and Mariyam Afeefa. Based on true incidents that occurred in an island of Maldives, she played the encouraging mother dealing with her heartbroken daughter. Prior to release the film was marketed to be full of "suspense and uniqueness" compared to other mediocre Maldivian horror films. Upon release, the film received mixed reviews from critics; majority of them complaining about having the "same old feeling" of prior horror flicks though the performance was noted to be satisfactory. Despite the mixed reviews, the film witnessed a positive response at the box office, screening a total of twenty two housefull shows in Male', declaring it as a mega-hit. She next featured in a family drama by Ali Shifau, Dhin Veynuge Hithaamaigaa (2010) as a ferocious aunt who along with her son destroy the life of her nephew. The film showcases discrimination against the islanders, family revenge and fatherhood responsibilities. The film and her performance received positive response from critics. The film was believed to be a "huge improvement" over the recent Maldivian films. Being able to screen fifteen housefull shows of the film, it was declared to be a commercial success. It was followed by Amjad Ibrahim's romantic horror film Vakinuvinama alongside Niuma Mohamed and Ravee Farooq, which was a critical and commercial failure. The last release of year featured Hassan in Yoosuf Shafeeu's drama film Heyonuvaane (2010), along with Shafeeu, Sheela Najeeb and Fathimath Fareela. The story revolves around a male who is a victim of domestic abuse. The film received majorly negative reviews from critics. Twenty two housefull shows of the film were screened at cinema, declaring it a mega-hit and second highest grossing Maldivian release of the year.

Hassan began 2011 in a brief role as a helpless mother witnessing her child being sexually abused by her brother-in-law, in the Moomin Fuad-directed crime tragedy drama Loodhifa. Featuring an ensemble cast, the film deals with current social issues in the society told from different perspectives of the characters. Made on a budget of MVR 600,000, the film was declared a commercial failure though it received wide critical acclaim, praising the performance of cast and the film's "realism" in its language, characters and their attitude. She again collaborated with Amjad Ibrahim for his family drama Hithey Dheymee (2011) which received negative reviews from critics and was a box office disaster. The same year, she starred alongside Ali Seezan, Aishath Rishmy and Mariyam Nisha, in Abdul Faththaah-directed 14 Vileyrey. Written by Ibrahim Waheed, the project faced controversy when the team of Kuhveriakee Kaakuhey? (2011) accuses Fatthah of "purloining the plot" of the latter. The film and her performance received mixed to positive reviews from critics". The film did good business at box office and was declared a "hit".

=== 2017–22: Further releases, death ===
After a break of seven years, Hassan appeared in Abdul Faththaah's romantic drama Hahdhu alongside Mariyam Azza, Aminath Rishfa and Ahmed Shiban. The film touched upon controversial issues in the Maldives including the depiction of flogging and also shines a light on mental health by featuring an attempted suicide. Hassan played the mother of Yusra-played by Mariyam Azza, an acquiescent and talkative young woman whose life changes with an extramarital affair. The film opened to mixed reviews from critics though it emerged as one of the highest grossing Maldivian films of the year.

Hassan collaborated with Amjad Ibrahim on his fiftieth direction, a horror film Reyvumun which stars Mohamed Manik and Najiha in pivotal roles. The film revolves around a newly married couple confronting horrifying events as they move into a house lived in by an elderly woman, who was just murdered.

Hassan died on 31 August 2022, whilst she was in Sri Lanka, undergoing medical treatment.

== Espionage charges ==
On 11 November 1992, Fauziyya Hassan was arrested on suspicion of being a spy along with her friend Mariyam Rasheedha. They were accused of being conduits that would pass on defence information to Pakistan and shown to be funded by a Maldivian banker. In an interview with the Malayalam daily Malayala Manorama, Hassan claimed she was forced to accept the allegations against her when the investigators brought her 14-year-old daughter before her and threatened to rape her. The charge of suspected espionage could not be proved and the court let off the two women though they remained in prison in view of other suits pending against them. Eventually, Hassan was cleared of all charges and released, only to be re-arrested under the National Security Act. Imprisoned in Kerala for over three years in the fake ISRO espionage case, Hassan demanded that India compensate her, without waiting for her to apply.

== In popular culture ==
In July 2022, a biographical drama film Rocketry: The Nambi Effect based on Nambi Narayanan's life was released, in which Hassan was played by Simran Mishrikoti.

== Filmography ==
=== Feature film ===
Year	Title	Role	Notes	Ref(s)
1985	Sidha	—N/a		
1999	Umurah	Niman's mother		
2000	Hiyy Halaaku	Shahil's mother		
2000	Himeyn Dhuniye	Sofi's mother		
2000	2000 Vana Ufan Dhuvas	Shareefa		
2000	Shaalinee	Shavin's mother		
2000	Emme Fahu Dhuvas	Nasheedha		
2003	Dhonkamana	Kuda Dhaitha / Dhonkamana		
2003	Edhi Edhi Hoadheemey	Dhon Aimina		
2003	Vehey Vaarey Therein	Ziyan's mother		
2004	Hatharu Udhares	Naseem's mother		
2004	Eynaa	Nasra's mother		
2004	Dharinnahtakai	Raheema		
2004	Sandhuravirey 2	Maya's mother		
2005	Handhu Keytha	Shuha's mother		
2005	Hureemey Inthizaarugaa	Manike		
2006	Hiyani	Shaina's mother		
2006	Vaaloabi Engeynama	Shareefa	Nominated—Gaumee Film Award for Best Supporting Actress	
2008	Yoosuf	Yasir's mother		
2009	Loaiybahtakaa	Sharmeela		
2009	Karuna Vee Beyvafa	Faathuma		
2010	Jinni	Rasheedha		
2010	Dhin Veynuge Hithaamaigaa	Fairooz's mother		
2010	Vakinuvinama	Aamina		
2010	Heyonuvaane	Muna's mother		
2011	Hiyy Vindhaa Nulaa	Suzy's mother		
2011	Loodhifa	Shifza's mother		
2011	Hithey Dheymee	Shakeela		
2011	14 Vileyrey	—N/a		
2017	Hahdhu	Yusra's mother	Nominated—Gaumee Film Award for Best Supporting Actress	
2018	Reyvumun	Hareera		
2021	Faree	Rashidha		
2024	Lasviyas	Maama		

=== Television ===
Year	Title	Role	Notes	Ref(s)
1999–2000	Maafkuraashey	Fauziyya	Main role; 10 episodes	
2000	Reysham	Sakeena	Main role; 5 episodes	
2000	Dhoapatta	Fayaz's mother	Guest role	
2003	Dheewanaa Hiyy	Asima	Main role; 5 episodes	
2004	Vaisoori	Various roles	3 segments; 6 episodes	
2004	Kamana Vareh Neiy	Kamana	Main role; 5 episodes	
2005	Baiveriyaa	Nazeera	Main role; 10 episodes	
2006–2008	Hinithun Velaashey Kalaa	Dhaleyka Moosa	Main role; 31 episodes	
2008	Loabin Hiyy Furenee	Zeyna's mother	Recurring role; 5 episodes	
2010	Magey Hithakee Hitheh Noon Hey?	Saleema	Main role; 5 parts	

=== Short film ===
Year	Title	Role	Notes	Ref(s)
2005	Dheke Dhekeves 2	Fauziyya "Faudy"	Special appearance	
2006	Dheke Dhekeves 3	Fauziyya "Faudy"		
2006	Dheke Dhekeves 4	Fauziyya "Faudy"		

== Accolades ==
Year	Award	Category	Nominated work	Result	Ref(s)
2008	5th Gaumee Film Awards	Best Supporting Actress	Vaaloabi Engeynama	Nominated	
2019	9th Gaumee Film Awards	Best Supporting Actress	Hahdhu	Nominated	
