= Reysham =

- Written by: Moosa Saaid
- Screenplay by: Abdul Faththaah
- Directed by: Abdul Faththaah; Mohamed Rasheed
- Country of origin: Maldives
- Original language: Dhivehi
- No. of seasons: 1
- No. of episodes: 22

Production
- Cinematography: Mohamed Rasheed
- Editor: Hassan Nishath
- Running time: 25–28 minutes

Original release
- Release: 2000

Reysham is a Maldivian television series directed by Abdul Faththaah and Mohamed Rasheed. Written by Moosa Saaid and distributed through the television channel Television Maldives, the series stars Mariyam Nisha, Ahmed, Assad Shareef, Shareef and Aminath Rasheedha in main roles.

== Cast ==
=== Main ===
- Mariyam Nisha as Zulfa
- Ahmed as Yazdhan
- Asad Shareef as Nasih
- Shareef as Ahusan
- Aminath Rasheedha as Athifa; Zulfa's mother
- Fauziyya Hassan as Sakeena
- Waleedha Waleed as Shaahidha
- Adam Manik as Shakir; Zulfa's father
- Mariyam Shakeela as Mariyam
- Mariyam Rasheedha as Zahira; Yazdhan's mother
- Aishath Shiznee as Riyasha

=== Recurring ===
- Afeef as Nazim
- Nooma Ibrahim as Nashwa
- Satthar Ibrahim Manik as Mariyam's father
- Shauzoon as Sameer
- Anee as Amira; Zulfa's colleague
- Hasifa as Azma; Zulfa's colleague
- Ashraf Nu'uman as Shahidh
- Mariyam Nazima as Jeelan
- Sakeena as Ahusan's mother
- Abdulla Faisal as Nabeel
- Athifa as Liva; Zulfa's younger sister
- Mohamed Rasheed as Nashid; Yazdhan's father

=== Guest ===
- Yazan as Unaish
- Koyya Hassan Manik as a magistrate
- Shareefa as Mariyam's mother
- Ahmed Saeed as Nasih's friend (Episode 4)
- Aishath Hanim
- Nazumee as Majid
- Mohamed Abdulla (Special appearance in the song medley; Episode 9)
- Aishath Gulfa (Special appearance in the song medley; Episode 9)

== Episodes ==
No. in season	Title	Directed by
1	"Episode 1"	Abdul Faththaah, Mohamed Rasheed
Nasih (Assad Shareef), a retailer working at a clothing store, is married to an indolent wife, Mariyam (Mariyam Shakeela) who gives no attention to her responsibility as a wife and mother. Zulfa (Mariyam Nisha) spends all her day grieving about her life and past. Zulfa's friend, Nashwa (Nooma Ibrahim) requests Zulfa to move in with her.
2	"Episode 2"	Abdul Faththaah, Mohamed Rasheed
Mariyam's father (Satthar Ibrahim Manik) initiated to appoint Nasih to operate one of his other stores to which Mariyam decided to manage the store herself. Nashwa introduces Zulfa to Nasih who was at the time looking for a maid to work at his house. Nashwa catches her husband, Nazim (Afeef) off guard.
3	"Episode 3"	Abdul Faththaah, Mohamed Rasheed
Nashwa requests Mairyam to keep Zulfa in her house for four months till Nashwa returns from abroad. Zulfa impresses Mariyam and Nasih with her well manners and discipline. However, Mariyam becomes suspicious of Nasih having an affair with Zulfa.
4	"Episode 4"	Abdul Faththaah, Mohamed Rasheed
As her suspicious grew further, Mariyam expels Zulfa from her house. However, this does not stop Nasih from taking care of Zulfa. Furious Mariyam seeks divorce while Nasih decides to relocate to his hometown, Addu after marrying Zulfa.
5	"Episode 5"	Abdul Faththaah, Mohamed Rasheed
While exploring Addu, Zulfa sees Yazdhan (Ahmed) with his wife, Riyasha (Shiznee) which makes her uncomfortable. Yazdhan and Riyasha are a happily married couple looking after Yazdhan's blind mother (Mariyam Rasheedha).
6	"Episode 6"	Abdul Faththaah, Mohamed Rasheed
After several attempts to reach out to Zulfa, Yazdhan finally shows up to her. They discuss about their past relationship and Zulfa announces that she does not want to continue any relation with Yazdhan hereafter.
7	"Episode 7"	Abdul Faththaah, Mohamed Rasheed
Reluctantly, Zulfa keeps meeting Yazdhan. Nasih's cousin, Sameer (Shauzoon) catches them together. Nasih inquires about her bond with Yazdhan to which she refused to recall any person of the name.
8	"Episode 8"	Abdul Faththaah, Mohamed Rasheed
Zulfa's friend, Azma (Hasifa) accidentally spills the details of Yazdhan's relationship with Zulfa in front of Riyasha. Nasih figures out Zulfa is lying and confronts her to tell the truth.
9	"Episode 9"	Abdul Faththaah, Mohamed Rasheed
Zulfa reveals her past. In 1995, Zulfa was studying in the same college with Yazdhan where their romantic relationship started. Meanwhile Yazdhan's friend, Ahusan (Shareef) starts dating Zulfa's best friend, Jeelan (Mariyam Nazima).
10	"Episode 10"	Abdul Faththaah, Mohamed Rasheed
Zulfa is mistreated by her landlord (Fauziyya Hassan) who assigns her to do daily chores of the house. Zulfa becomes uncomfortable with the presence of Shahid (Ashraf), a mentally unstable young boy.
11	"Episode 11"	Abdul Faththaah, Mohamed Rasheed
Yazdhan narrates his childhood story of him; how he was abandoned by his father and the death of his father. Ahusan, bored of his girlfriend Jeelan, starts seeing his ex-girlfriend, Neesh.
12	"Episode 12"	Abdul Faththaah, Mohamed Rasheed
Jeelan catches her boyfriend, Ahsan red-handed with Neesh. Jeelan who is still madly in love with Ahsan, desires to be with him while Ahsan decides to terminate their romantic relationship. Zulfa, who has completed her education is afraid that her mother (Aminath Rasheedha would take her to her island. Yazdhan hopes to buy few days before convincing her mother of their marriage plan.
13	"Episode 13"	Abdul Faththaah, Mohamed Rasheed
Zulfa's mother discloses her disapproval for their relationship, citing his financial status while mocking him for being deprived of a father's love. She forces Zulfa to relocate to her island while Jeelan, having lost faith in love decides to move to India.
14	"Episode 14"	Abdul Faththaah, Mohamed Rasheed
Yazdhan, with the help of Nabeel, visits Zulfa's island hoping to reconcile with her, while Athifa is hell-bent on making Zulfa's life miserable.
15	"Episode 15"	Abdul Faththaah, Mohamed Rasheed
Zulfa and Yazdhan meet secretly and discuss their future plans while Athifa finalizes Zulfa's marriage to a wealthy businessman, Mohamed, who is also convicted of drug offenses. Nabeel’s elder sister, Shaahidha (Waleedha Waleed) falls in love with Yazdhan and submits for his love which he rejects.
16	"Episode 16"	Abdul Faththaah, Mohamed Rasheed
Zulfa is informed to be prepared for Mohamed’s return in two days. Shaahidha firmly decides to continue with her unrequited love for Yazdhan. Late night, Athifa catches Zulfa secretly meeting with Yazdhan on a beach and makes sure that Zulfa learns a lesson for disobeying her.
17	"Episode 17"	Abdul Faththaah, Mohamed Rasheed
Yazdhan had to rush back home as he becomes of aware of his mother's medical condition, which worsen the situation for Zulfa. Shakir unintentionally discloses a family secret that Athifa is Zulfa's step-mother.
18	"Episode 18"	Abdul Faththaah, Mohamed Rasheed
Liva, a thalassemia patient dies at a young age bringing sorrow to an already depressed family. Shakir insists Nabeel to marry Zulfa while she desperately waits for Yazdhan to return.
19	"Episode 19"	Abdul Faththaah, Mohamed Rasheed
In the present, Nasih struggles to regain his trust for Zulfa while Yazdhan and Riyasha start drifting apart in their relationship.
20	"Episode 20"	Abdul Faththaah, Mohamed Rasheed
Yazdhan and Nasih befriend unbeknownst to each other of their common relation. Nasih realizes that his recent friend is the ex-boyfriend of his wife and attempt a background check of him. In a flashback, it is revealed that Yazdhan's father, Nashid (Mohamed Rasheed) has another son from his previous marriage.
21	"Episode 21"	Abdul Faththaah, Mohamed Rasheed
Zulfa is revealed to be two months pregnant. However, this does not smoothen her relationship with Nasih, as he tries hard to conceal the truth from Zulfa, that Yazdhan is his younger brother. Soon after he reveals the secret, Nasih gets electrocuted in the toilet.
22	"Episode 22"	Abdul Faththaah, Mohamed Rasheed

== Soundtrack ==
Track listing
No.	Title	Lyrics	Singer(s)	Length
1.	"Reysham"	Jaufar Abdul Rahman	Ahmed Amir, Lalit	04:30

== Response ==
The series was released in 2000. Upon release, it received positive reviews from critics and viewers. Sajid Abdulla reviewing from MuniAvas selected the series in the "Top 10 best television series of all time" and wrote: "The series will remain one of the best direction by Abdul Faththaah. Known for its emotional storyline and superb acting, the acting by Nisha in the series is her career-best". The theme song of the series was a chartbuster and was "unbeatable" even after its cover versions".
