= Guest House Room Number:201 =

2008 short film directed by Amjad Ibrahim

- Directed by: Amjad Ibrahim
- Written by: Amjad Ibrahim
- Screenplay by: Amjad Ibrahim
- Produced by: Mohamed Shavin
- Starring: Mohamed Shavin; Khadheeja Ibrahim Didi; Aminath Ameela; Hussain Solah
- Cinematography: Mohamed Nasheed
- Edited by: Ali Musthafa
- Music by: Monas
- Production company: V Stream Production
- Release date: January 10, 2008
- Running time: 65 minutes
- Country: Maldives
- Language: Dhivehi

Guest House Room Number:201 is a 2008 Maldivian mystery, thriller film directed by Amjad Ibrahim. Produced by Mohamed Shavin under V Stream Production, the film stars Mohamed Shavin, Khadheeja Ibrahim Didi, Aminath Ameela and Hussain Solah in pivotal roles.

== Premise ==
A newly married couple, Viaam (Mohamed Shavin) and Lailaa (Khadheeja Ibrahim Didi) enter Maagiri Hotel and request for a room where the receptionist hands over them the key for the room number 201, much to the discomfort of Viaam, who has an unforgettable memory attached with the same room. Soon after, Lailaa starts experiencing paranormal activities in the room, which drives her into madness. She sees a man (Hussain Solah) wearing a yellow shirt, covered in blood who warns her about Viaam, calling him a murderer. Helpless, Viaam tells everything to Lailaa on how he met the guy and the reason for assault.

== Cast ==
- Mohamed Shavin as Viaam
- Khadheeja Ibrahim Didi as Lailaa
- Aminath Ameela as Aneesa
- Hussain Solah as receptionist

== Soundtrack ==
Track listing
No.	Title	Singer(s)	Length
1.	"Aawaaraakan"	Mukhthar Adam
2.	"Meheboob Magey"	Mukhthar Adam, Fazeela Amir
3.	"Dheewaana Adhu Vee Ey"	Ali Rameez
