= Eynaa =

- Official film poster
- Directed by: Abdul Faththaah
- Screenplay by: Abdul Faththaah
- Produced by: Aslam Rasheed
- Starring: Sheela Najeeb; Mohamed Manik; Ahmed Shah; Khadheeja Ibrahim Didi; Ibrahim Jihad; Nashidha Mohamed; Hassan Afeef
- Cinematography: Ibrahim Moosa; Hassan Haleem
- Edited by: Ahmed Shah; Abdul Faththaah
- Music by: Ibrahim Nifar
- Production company: Slam Studio
- Release date: September 2, 2004
- Country: Maldives
- Language: Dhivehi

Eynaa is a 2004 Maldivian horror film directed by Abdul Faththaah. Produced by Aslam Rasheed under Slam Studio, the film stars Sheela Najeeb, Mohamed Manik, Ahmed Shah, Khadheeja Ibrahim Didi, Ibrahim Jihad, Nashidha Mohamed and Hassan Afeef in pivotal roles.

== Plot ==
On 12 Shawwal 1420, a group of six colleagues go on a picnic to an uninhabited island rumored to be cursed where horrifying incidents occur for the 13th, 14th and 15th of each month. The island was restricted from visiting for the past ten years, but permitted for a special request from Fasee (Ibrahim Jihad). On arrival they are welcomed by Shathir, a notable historian, who came to the island to prepare a thesis for his PhD. After refreshing, the group dispersed around the island exploring and enjoying the view. The group includes four lovers; Neena (Khadheeja Ibrahim Didi) and Riyaz (Ahmed Shah), Fasee and Nasra (Nashidha Mohamed) and two exes; Nihan (Mohamed Manik) and Malakaa (Sheela Najeeb).

During the stay, they met with some unusual incidents which the group differs to believe; Malakaa presumably seeing a human skull while Neena and Riyaz felt a strange cooling breeze rushed over them after they had an intimate moment. After dinner, Riyaz and Neena planned to scare rest of the group by wearing a mask. The plan was going smooth till Neena fells upon the same skull Malakaa mentioned and she failed to remove the mask off her face. She was killed by the spirit and the group splits into two searching for her. Riyaz and Shathir finds Neena hanging on tree with the mask on. The duo ran for their lives when the spirit pulled Riyaz's leg and drowned him into the sea. Shathir was able to save himself since he was wearing an amulet on his waist. He recalls having the knowledge that the spirit has a connection with the moon; once a cloud shadows over the moon, her supernatural powers strengthen.

Shathir went back to his tent to fetch his research documents. Quarrel within the group arises when Nihan suspects Shathir is hiding several facts from them. Shathir informs them that the island was believed to be haunted and the island disappears during this period. The group leave together to search for the skull which Malakaa found. However, the team separates and Fasee and Nasra are ultimately killed. Nihan and Shathir engage in a fight and Nihan breaks Shathir's amulet. Shathir snatches the amulet back from him and breaks Nihan's leg. Shathir discovers the skull and finds out the truth about the island; a man killed his wife when she found out about his extramarital affairs and buried her on the island. Shathir is then murdered while holding the skull. Malakaa and Nihan locate a wood pallet and they try to swim off but Nihan falls off the pallet and dies while Malakaa makes it off the shore. She later awakens with no prior memories, lying on the pallet in the middle of the sea.

== Cast ==
- Sheela Najeeb as Malakaa
- Mohamed Manik as Nihan
- Ahmed Shah as Riyaz
- Khadheeja Ibrahim Didi as Neena
- Ibrahim Jihad as Fasee
- Nashidha Mohamed as Nasra
- Hassan Afeef as Shathir
- Mariyam Nisha as Aani
- Mariyam Shakeela
- Ali Ahmed (Special appearance)
- Mohamed Afrah (Special appearance)
- Fauziyya Hassan as Nasra's mother

== Soundtrack ==
Track listing
No.	Title	Lyrics	Music	Singer(s)	Length
1.	"Moorithi Zuvaan Hinithun"	Ahmed Nashid	Muaviyath Anwar	Mukhthar Adam, Aishath Inaya
2.	"Naanaa"	Ahmed Nashid	Muaviyath Anwar	Aishath Inaya
3.	"Mi Hiyy Adhu"	Ahmed Nashid	Muaviyath Anwar	Mukhthar Adam, Fazeela Amir
4.	"Thiya Loabi Mirey"	Ahmed Nashid	Muaviyath Anwar	Mukhthar Adam
5.	"Loabin Thi Loabin"	Ahmed Nashid	Muaviyath Anwar	Abdul Baaree, Aishath Inaya

== Accolades ==
Year	Award	Category	Recipients	Result	Ref(s)
2007	4th Gaumee Film Awards	Best Actor	Mohamed Manik	Nominated	
2007	4th Gaumee Film Awards	Best Cinematography	Ibrahim Moosa and Hassan Haleem	Won	
2007	Miadhu Crystal Award	Best Editing	Ahmed Shah and Abdul Faththaah	Won	
2007	Miadhu Crystal Award	Best Background Music	Ibrahim Nifar	Won	
