= Khadheeja Ibrahim Didi =

Maldivian film actress

Khadheeja Ibrahim Didi is a former Maldivian film actress.

== Career ==
Khadheeja Ibrahim Didi appeared in Abdul Faththaah's horror film Eynaa, released in 2004, with Sheela Najeeb, Mohamed Manik, Ahmed Shah, Ibrahim Jihad and Nashidha Mohamed as one of six colleagues who go on a picnic to a haunted uninhabited island and face a battle for survival. The film garnered critical appreciation especially for its technical department and was a commercial success. She then made an appearance as a cheating girlfriend and a spirit in Yoosuf Shafeeu directed horror film Edhathuru (2004) which revolves around eight friends who go on a picnic to an island and how they fight to survive the horrific incidents that befall them. The film was appreciated by critics, specifically praising its sound effect and was a commercial success. Didi received her first Gaumee Film Award nomination as the Best Supporting Actress for her "authentic" performance as the cunning and unfaithful girlfriend who is having an extramarital affair with a married man in Abdul Faththaah's critically praised romantic film Vehey Vaarey Therein (2003). Featuring Yoosuf Shafeeu, Jamsheedha Ahmed, Mohamed Shavin, Amira Ismail and Aminath Rasheedha in crucial roles, the film narrates the story of unrequited love, and proved to be one of the highest-grossing Maldivian films of the year. She rose to widespread prominence in the television industry with her performance as a colleague seducing her friend's husband in the Arifa Ibrahim-directed critically acclaimed television series, Vairoalhi Ahves Sirrun (2005) which revolves around two best-friends involved in extra-marital affairs and who fail to practice their duty as husband and wife. Starring alongside Niuma Mohamed, Ahmed Asim, Aminath Rasheedha and Mariyam Shakeela, the series was listed as one of the most successful television series.

In 2011, Didi played the role of Afiya, the wife from an underprivileged family grabbing every chance to sustain their basic needs, in the Moomin Fuad-directed crime tragedy drama Loodhifa. Featuring an ensemble cast, the film deals with modern social issues in society told from the different perspectives of the characters. Made on a budget of MVR 600,000, the film was declared a commercial failure though it received wide critical acclaim. Her portrayal garnered her several award nominations, including a Gaumee Film Award nomination for Best Supporting Actress and a Maldives Film Award nomination as Best Supporting Actor. She next starred in a small role as a nurse in Abdul Faththaah's romantic film Love Story (2012) alongside Ali Seezan, Aishath Rishmy and Amira Ismail.

In 2018, Didi was featured alongside Mohamed Jumayyil, Mariyam Majudha and Nuzuhath Shuaib in Ali Shifau's family drama Vakin Loabin (2018). The film tells a story of a young couple’s divorce and its impact on everyone involved. Upon release, the film met with a positive response from critics, specifically praising the screenplay for toning down its melodrama and breaking from the stereotypes of its genre, and it was a commercial success.

== Media image ==
In 2012, she was ranked at the seventh position in the list of "Best Actresses in Maldives" compiled by Haveeru.

== Filmography ==
=== Feature film ===
Year	Title	Role	Notes	Ref(s)
2003	Kalaayaanulaa	Herself	Special appearance in the song "Hee Samaasa Rattehinna"	
2003	Vehey Vaarey Therein	Aminath Nathasha	Nominated—Gaumee Film Award for Best Supporting Actress	
2004	Hama Himeyn	Fazeela		
2004	Eynaa	Neena		
2004	Edhathuru	Thaniya		
2006	Hithuge Edhun	Herself	Special appearance	
2010	Mi Hiyy Keekkuraanee?	Firasha		
2011	Loodhifa	Afiya	Nominated—Gaumee Film Award for Best Supporting Actress; Nominated—Maldives Film Awards for Best Supporting Actress	
2012	Love Story	Nurse	Special appearance	
2015	Emme Fahu Vindha Jehendhen	Amira		
2018	Vakin Loabin	Salma	Gaumee Film Award for Best Supporting Actress	
2023	Loabi Vevijje	Customer	Special appearance	
2024	Lasviyas	Maastha		

=== Television ===
Year	Title	Role	Notes	Ref(s)
2003	Ruheveynee Kon Hithakun?		Teledrama	
2004	Thiyey Mihithuge Vindhakee	Mizna	Guest role; "Episode 31"	
2004	Vaisoori	Seema / Sameera	In the segments "Namoonaa Akah Vaasheve!" and "An'dhiri Hayaaiy"	
2004	Kamana Vareh Neiy	Muna	Main role; 4 episodes	
2005–2006	Fukkashi	Various roles	Main role; 5 episodes	
2005	Baiveriyaa	Leena	Main role; 12 episodes	
2005–2006	Vairoalhi Ahves Sirrun	Thooba	Main role; 52 episodes	
2006	Kuramey Vadhaaee Salaam	Firasha	Main role; 13 episodes	
2006	Saaraa		Main role	
2006–2008	Hinithun Velaashey Kalaa	Inaya	Main role; 48 episodes	
2007	Vamey Kaireegaa Kalaa			
2008	Loabin Hiyy Furenee	Maiha	Main role; 5 episodes	
2008	Manzilakee Thee Ey Magey		Main role	
2009	Silsilaa	Zulshan	Main role; 5 episodes	
2009	Sirru Sirrun Kalaa	Azeeza "Azza"	Main role	

=== Short film ===
Year	Title	Role	Notes
2006	Kiss Jazbaath	Leena	
2006	Mohamma Kalo V/S Bao Kalo	Hudha	
2006	Handi Ganduvaru Dhonkamana	Snow White	
2007	Magey Dharifulhu	Aishath Noora	
2008	Guest House Room Number:201	Lailaa	
2010	Keevvehey Vakivee Yaaraa?	Zeena	

== Accolades ==
Year	Award	Category	Nominated work	Result	Ref(s)
2007	4th Gaumee Film Awards	Best Supporting Actress	Vehey Vaarey Therein	Nominated	
2012	2nd Maldives Film Awards	Best Supporting Actress	Loodhifa	Nominated	
2016	7th Gaumee Film Awards	Best Supporting Actress	Loodhifa	Nominated	
2019	9th Gaumee Film Awards	Best Supporting Actress	Vakin Loabin	Won	
