= Reyvumun =

- Official film poster
- Directed by: Amjad Ibrahim
- Written by: Amjad Ibrahim
- Screenplay by: Amjad Ibrahim
- Produced by: Amjad Ibrahim; Ahmed Shaz; Mohamed Manik
- Starring: Mohamed Manik; Najiha
- Cinematography: Mohamed Aboobakuru
- Edited by: Ahmed Ziya
- Music by: Hussain Sobah
- Production company: Jayz Entertainment
- Release date: March 24, 2018
- Running time: 140 minutes
- Country: Maldives
- Language: Dhivehi

Reyvumun is a 2018 Maldivian horror film written and directed by Amjad Ibrahim. Produced by Ibrahim, Ahmed Shaaz and Mohamed Manik under Jayz Entertainment, the film stars Mohamed Manik and Najihaa Azoor in pivotal roles. The film was released on 24 March 2018.

== Plot ==
Zufar, a cruel and perverted husband, subjects his wife, Shahidha, to abuse, and he is determined to find Shahidha's younger sister, Shaheen, who Shahidha has concealed from Zufar for clear reasons. In a separate apartment, Yanish and Shaheen, a joyful and affectionate couple, live together. Shaheen expresses her wish to expedite their marriage, but Yanish must delay it due to financial instability. However, Yanish eventually secures a job and begins to plan their wedding. As they prepare for their upcoming nuptials, peculiar occurrences disrupt their lives. Yanish starts to see blood everywhere, while Shaheen perceives a deceased woman, Hareera, taking on the appearances of other people. Frightened by these experiences, Shaheen urges Yanish to consider moving to a different house.

== Cast ==
- Mohamed Manik as Yanish
- Najihaa Azoor as Shaheen
- Ahmed Shaaz as Zufar
- Mariyam Shakeela as Shahida
- Fauziyya Hassan as Hareera
- Roanu Hassan Manik as Bushree
- Nashidha Ali as Aneesa
- Ali Rasheed
- Aishath Safna
- Hoodhu Saajid
- Ibrahim Riyazz
- Ibrahim Fauzan
- Mohamed Fauzan
- Mohamed Ibrahim
- Aishath Aina Ali

== Development ==
Reyvumun is directed by Amjad Ibrahim, marking his fifty-second direction of a feature film. After the film Hithey Dheymee (2011), Ibrahim took a break of eight years before returning to the work of film direction. Filming took place in Hulhumale'.

== Soundtrack ==
Track listing
| No. | Title | Music | Singer(s) | Length |
|---|---|---|---|---|
| 1. | "Hiyy Kiyanee" | Hussain Sobah | Mumthaz Moosa, Nashidha Ahmed | 5:20 |
| 2. | "Himafodhu Vaarey" | Hussain Sobah | Hussain Sobah, Fathimath Zoona | 4:48 |
| 3. | "Reyvumun" | Hussain Sobah | Fathimath Zoona | 6:27 |
