= Himeyn Dhuniye =

- Official film poster
- Directed by: Abdul Faththaah
- Written by: Moosa Latheef
- Screenplay by: Ahmed Ayaz; Abdul Faththaah
- Produced by: Ismail Naseer; Moosa Latheef
- Cinematography: Ibrahim Moosa
- Edited by: Mujuthaba Rasheed
- Music by: Ibrahim Nifar
- Production company: Dhekedhekeves Productions
- Release date: 2000
- Running time: 156 minutes
- Country: Maldives
- Language: Dhivehi

Himeyn Dhuniye is a 2000 Maldivian drama film directed by Abdul Faththaah. Produced by Ismail Naseer, Moosa Latheef under Dhekedhekeves Productions, the film stars Ali Khalid and Mariyam Nisha in lead roles.

== Premise ==
Ahmed (Ali Khalid), a womanizer, has an extra-marital affair with his colleague, Sofi (Mariyam Nisha) who is dealing with her recent breakup with a drug addict, Imthiyaz. Ahmed, being disloyal to his patient wife, Shaheedha (Aminath Rasheedha) is involved with another woman, a widow, Nahidha (Mariyam Shakeela) while Sofi mistreats her own mother (Fauziyya Hassan).

== Cast ==
- Mariyam Nisha as Sofi
- Ali Khalid as Ahmed
- Moosa Zakariyya as Shamil
- Sajna Ahmed as Suzi
- Aminath Rasheedha as Shaheedha
- Mariyam Shakeela as Nahidha
- Ashraf Numaan as Imthiyaz
- Fauziyya Hassan as Sofi's mother
- Zuleykha Abdul Latheef as Maisara
- Aminath Ibrahim Didi as Shamil's mother
- Ismail Zahir
- Koyya Hassan Manik as Shamil's stepfather (Special appearance)
- Ismail Hilmy as Maisara's husband (Special appearance)
- Hussain Nooradeen as a Taxi Driver (Special appearance)

== Soundtrack ==
Track listing
No.	Title	Lyrics	Music	Singer(s)	Length
1.	"Himeyn Dhuniye"	Mohamed Amir	Ibrahim Nifar	Mukhthar Adam
2.	"Loabin Heelaagothun"	Mohamed Amir	Ibrahim Nifar	Ibrahim Nifar
3.	"Farive Finifen Malaa"	Mohamed Amir	Ibrahim Nifar	Mukhthar Adam
4.	"Vettunu Maleh"	Mohamed Amir	Ibrahim Nifar	Aishath Inaya
