= Vehey Vaarey Therein =

- Official film poster
- Directed by: Abdul Faththaah
- Written by: Ibrahim Waheed
- Screenplay by: Abdul Faththaah; Ahmed Ayaz
- Produced by: Shiham Rasheed; Abdul Faththaah
- Starring: Yoosuf Shafeeu; Jamsheedha Ahmed; Mohamed Shavin; Khadheeja Ibrahim Didi; Amira Ismail
- Cinematography: Shaniz
- Edited by: Shaniz; Abdul Faththaah
- Music by: Hussain Sobah
- Production company: Motion Pictures
- Release date: 2003
- Running time: 159 minutes
- Country: Maldives
- Language: Dhivehi

Vehey Vaarey Therein is a 2003 Maldivian romantic film co-produced and directed by Abdul Faththaah. Produced by Fatthah and Shiham Rasheed under Motion Pictures, the film stars Yoosuf Shafeeu, Jamsheedha Ahmed, Mohamed Shavin, Khadheeja Ibrahim Didi and Amira Ismail in pivotal roles.

== Premise ==
Liusha (Jamsheedha Ahmed) an innocent young woman suffering sexual abuse from her guardian agreed to marry Azim (Yoosuf Shafeeu) a negligent and short tempered man whom she met at a party of a mutual friend's. Brainwashed by Azim's friends as wives are a liability, he shows impolite behavior to his wife and continues an affair with his ex-lover, Aminath Nathasha (Khadheeja Ibrahim Didi) who hints that she will marry him, only if Azim and Liusha's relationship breaks on the latter's culpability. Liusha gets pregnant, distressing Azim and Nathasha. Months later, Nathasha leaves to Sri Lanka and Liusha gives birth to a boy which ultimately resulted Azim repenting himself and spending more time with his baby and wife. Nathasha returns from Lanka and was displeased to know Azim has created a boundary within them. She then uses black magic to pull Azim closer back to her.

== Cast ==
- Yoosuf Shafeeu as Azim
- Jamsheedha Ahmed as Liusha
- Mohamed Shavin as Mohamed Ziyan
- Khadheeja Ibrahim Didi as Aminath Nathasha
- Amira Ismail as Nareema
- Aminath Rasheedha as Azim's mother
- Koyya Hassan Manik as Asim
- Fauziyya Hassan as Ziyan's mother
- Ahmed Saeed as Nafil
- Ahmed Shah as Azim's friend (Special appearance)
- Mohamed Faisal as Azim's friend (Special appearance)
- Waleedha Waleed (Special appearance in the song "Hama Nidhi Nunidheyney")
- Sithi Fulhu as a sorcerer (Special appearance)
- Ahmed Asim as Nathasha's boyfriend (Special appearance)

== Soundtrack ==
Track listing
No.	Title	Lyrics	Singer(s)	Length
1.	"Jaadhooga Jehijjey"	Easa Shareef	Mukhthar Adam, Aishath Inaya
2.	"Nan Bunan Kereynehey?"	Easa Shareef	Abdul Baaree, Shifa Thaufeeq
3.	"Yaaraa Ey Loaiybeh Nuveyehy?"	Easa Shareef	Mariyam Unoosha, Mohamed Zaidh
4.	"I Love You"	Easa Shareef	Muawiyath Anwar
5.	"Kalaa Kalaa"	Easa Shareef	Aishath Inaya
6.	"Hama Nidhi Nunidheyney"	Easa Shareef	Aishath Inaya, Mukhthar Adam

== Accolades ==
Year	Award	Category	Recipients	Result	Ref.
2007	4th Gaumee Film Awards	Best Film	Vehey Vaarey Therein	Won	
2007	4th Gaumee Film Awards	Best Director	Abdul Faththaah	Won	
2007	4th Gaumee Film Awards	Best Actor	Yoosuf Shafeeu	Won	
2007	4th Gaumee Film Awards	Best Actress	Jamsheedha Ahmed	Nominated	
2007	4th Gaumee Film Awards	Best Supporting Actor	Mohamed Shavin	Nominated	
2007	4th Gaumee Film Awards	Best Supporting Actress	Khadheeja Ibrahim Didi	Nominated	
2007	4th Gaumee Film Awards	Best Screenplay	Abdul Faththaah	Won	
2007	4th Gaumee Film Awards	Best Art Direction	Abdul Faththaah	Won	
2007	4th Gaumee Film Awards	Best Makeup	Abdul Faththaah	Won	
