= Fahu Fiyavalhu =

Maldivian television drama series

- Genre: Drama
- Written by: Moosa Latheef
- Screenplay by: Moosa Latheef
- Directed by: Abdul Faththaah
- Starring: Koyya Hassan Manik; Mohamed Manik; Hassan Afeef; Sheela Najeeb
- No. of seasons: 1
- No. of episodes: 5

Production
- Cinematography: Abdulla Shameel
- Editor: Mohamed Jinah
- Running time: 25-39 minutes

Original release
- Release: November 10, 2002 – 8 December 2002

Fahu Fiyavalhu is a 2002 Maldivian television drama series developed for Television Maldives by Abdul Faththaah. The series stars Koyya Hassan Manik, Mohamed Manik, Hassan Afeef and Sheela Najeeb in pivotal roles.

== Cast ==
=== Main ===
- Koyya Hassan Manik as Ramiz Abdul Satthar
- Mohamed Manik as Ishaq Ramiz
- Hassan Afeef as Shiyam Ibrahim
- Sheela Najeeb as Yumna Easa
- Fathimath Sazna as Mariyam Reemaz
- Zabeeru as Siraj
- Sheereen Abdul Wahid as Mizna Mohamed

=== Recurring ===
- Mariyam Shakeela as Rahma
- Haajara Abdul Kareem as Sihthi Dhaleyka
- Mohamed Yoosuf as Yahya Adam
- Ahmed Ziya as Firaq
- Chilhiya Moosa Manik as Mizna's teacher

=== Guest ===
- Waleedha Waleed as Zuhudha
- Ismail Zahir
- Naeem as a well-wisher
- Ibrahim Rasheed as Mohamed Zahir

== Episodes ==
No. in season	Title	Directed by
1	"Episode 1"	Abdul Faththaah
Ramiz (Koyya Hassan Manik) suffering from a terminating illness, lives a miserable life due to the constant quarrel of his daughter, Reemaz (Shazna) and Rahma (Mariyam Shakeela) against Mizna (Sheereen Abdul Wahid) who stays with the family to complete her teaching course. Ramiz's only son, Ishaq (Mohamed Manik) who resides in Malaysia for his studies, is in a romantic relationship with an undereducated woman, Yumna (Sheela Najeeb) who previously had an affair with Reemaz's husband, Siraj (Zabeeru)
2	"Episode 2"	Abdul Faththaah
Ramiz's health condition gets worse. He reveals to Mizna that all her responsibilities lie with him by her mother's will. Shiyam financially helps Yumna before she is expelled from her residence. Mizna's teacher (Chilhiya Moosa Manik) handout a biography he has penned regarding a local wealthy businessman who is believed to be connected with her mother.
3	"Episode 3"	Abdul Faththaah
Ishaq discontinues his studies and returns to Maldives with marriage plans. Shiyam discovers that Rahma is having an affair with another man and hence divorces her. Ishaq warns Reemaz not to cross her line in the family.
4	"Episode 4"	Abdul Faththaah
5	"Episode 5"	Abdul Faththaah

== Soundtrack ==
Track listing
No.	Title	Lyrics	Music	Singer(s)	Length
1.	"Yaarunnah Beyzaaru"	Jaufar Abdul Rahman	Mohamed Ikram	Ahmed Athif
2.	"Masthu Vejjey"	Jaufar Abdul Rahman	Mohamed Ikram	Ahmed Athif, Shifa Thaufeeq
