= Aminath Rasheedha =

Maldivian actress and director (born 1967)

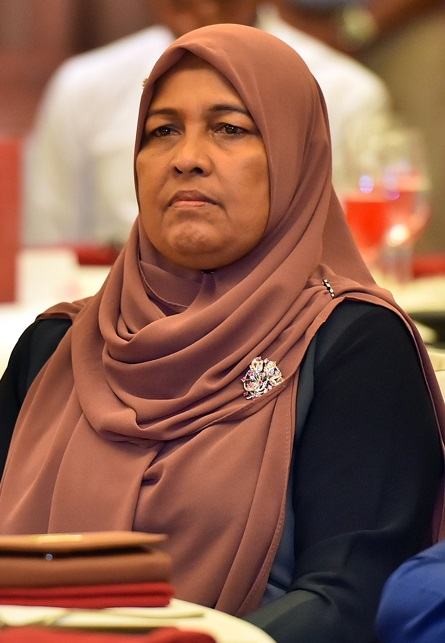
- Rasheedha at Niuma Mohamed's Silver Jubilee celebration event, 2019
- Born: 27 February 1967 (age 59); Malé, Sultanate of the Maldive Islands
- Occupations: Actress, director
- Spouses: Rameez (divorced) Ahmed Shiyam (divorced)
- Children: Aishath Rishmy; Mariyam Azza

Aminath Rasheedha (born 27 February 1967) is a Maldivian actress and director.

== Career ==
=== 1993–2006: Early releases and directorial debut ===
In 1995, Rasheedha appeared in Mohamed Shiyaz's Dhushman which features Hussain Sobah, Mariyam Nisha and Hamid Ali in pivotal roles. In the film, she plays the role Seema, a sympathetic doctor who falls in love with a blind man. Rasheedha made a brief appearance in Yoosuf Rafeeu's award-winning film Haqqu (1996) as Madheeha, a friend of Areesha who suffers from an unhappy marriage. The film starring Mariyam Nisha, Reeko Moosa Manik and Mariyam Shakeela in lead roles, received positive reviews from critics.

She starred in Mohamed Ali Manik's Maazee (2000) which narrates the story of two best friends, a boy and a girl, who get separated at childhood and reunite as adults. Rasheedha played the role of Zubeydha, the impecunious mother who sends her daughter to Male' seeking a prosperous future only to be dejected by her daughter as an adult. In 1998, she played the helpless mother of Mary, a devoted wife desperately seeking affection from her husband in Abdul Faththaah's television drama series Dhoapatta (2000). Starring alongside Mohamed Shavin, Sheela Najeeb and Jamsheedha Ahmed, the series centers on unrequited love and complications of a relationship within and beyond marriage. Her collaboration with Faththaah was repeated the same year with another romantic drama series, Aisha where she played the infertile widow handling a guest-house business. Mariyam Shauqee's widely acclaimed family drama television series Kahthiri was released during the same year, where he played the role of the dependable sister-in-law, living in a congested housing complex while dealing with several social issues.

This was followed by the Ali Musthafa-directed Umurah (1999) opposite Jamsheedha Ahmed and Reeko Moosa Manik. In the next year she played the role of Shaheedha, a loyal wife who looks past her husband's affairs with other women in Abdul Faththaah's directorial debut, Himeyn Dhuniye which received positive reviews from critics. Also, she starred as a workaholic mother in Hussain Shihab's Rihun and as a caring aunt in the Abdulla Sujau and Abdul Faththaah-directed family drama Ranmuiy which is centered on the dispute between a daughter and her step-mother.

Rasheedha collaborated with Amjad Ibrahim for his romantic horror film Dhonkamana (2003) which depicts the romantic relationship between a young man (played by Yoosuf Shafeeu) and an old woman (played by Fauziyya Hassan). Featuring Hassan, Yoosuf Shafeeu, Sheela Najeeb, Niuma Mohamed, Sheereen Abdul Wahid and Amira Ismail, the film received mainly negative reviews from critics though its inclusion of the theme portraying the relationship between a couple with a large age group was appraised. Her most successful release of the year was Fathimath Nahula's romantic film Kalaayaanulaa (2003) which follows a happily married couple (played by Yoosuf Shafeeu and Aishath Shiranee) where the husband decided to marry his childhood best friend (played by Niuma Mohamed) when his wife fails to sexually please him. The film received widespread critical acclaim for its performances and was declared to be year's highest grossing Maldivian film release. It was followed by Abdul Faththaah-directed Aan... Aharenves Loabivin (2002) starred alongside Ali Seezan, Niuma Mohamed, Sheela Najeeb and Neena Saleem where she played the mother of her only child who had a bitter relationship with her lovers and an unfortunate incidence leading her to suffer from amnesia. Upon release, the film opened to positive response from critics and was a commercially successful project. She was applauded for her performance as the unjust mother-in-law, in the Abdul Faththaah-directed critically acclaimed television series, Thiyey Mihithuge Vindhakee (2003) which was considered one of the best series production in television industry.

Rasheedha next starred as the mother of a heartbroken fangirl in Amjad Ibrahim's next directorial venture Sandhuravirey 2 (2004); a sequel to his 2002 horror film Sandhuravirey which presented Yoosuf Shafeeu and Mariyam Nisha in lead roles. Starring additional cast including Zeenath Abbas, Mohamed Shavin and Sheereen Abdul Wahid, the film follows a storyline of a daughter jinn avenging the death of its mother and sister on Dhiyash's family. Similar to its prequel, the film received negative response from critics.

Rasheedha received appreciation for her "authentic" performance as the benign mother of her loyal and depressive daughter-in-law in Abdul Faththaah's critically praised romantic film Vehey Vaarey Therein (2003). Featuring Yoosuf Shafeeu, Jamsheedha Ahmed, Khadheeja Ibrahim Didi, Mohamed Shavin and Amira Ismail in crucial roles, the film narrates the story of unrequited love, and proved to be one of the highest-grossing Maldivian films of the year. She then stepped into Fathimath Nahula's critically and commercially successful romantic drama television series, Kalaage Haqqugaa to portray the role of Waheedha, a demanding mother who is ready to go extreme extent to keep her family intact. She rose to widespread prominence in the television industry with her performance as a religious and protective mother in the Arifa Ibrahim-directed critically acclaimed television series, Vairoalhi Ahves Sirrun (2005) which revolves around two best-friends involved in extra-marital affairs and who fail to practice their duty as husband and wife. Starring alongside Niuma Mohamed, Ahmed Asim, Lufshan Shakeeb and Mariyam Shakeela, the series was listed as one of the most successful television series.

Rasheedha starred, produced and co-directed Yaaraa's debut production, a romantic horror film Hukuru Vileyrey alongside Aishath Rishmy which was based on a novel published by Ibrahim Waheed on Haveeru Daily in 2003. The film was a critical and commercial success while being considered "one of the few acceptable horror film the Maldivian Film Industry has ever produced". It was later released as 15 episodes television series with inclusion of several clips that were edited off while released in theatre. The same year, she again collaborated with the team of Vairoalhi Ahves Sirrun for Arifa Ibrahim's another romantic television drama series, Vaguthu Faaithu Nuvanees (2006) which consists of fifty episodes. The series which follows the vengeance and retribution two best-friends go through when they both love the same person, features Rasheedha in a villainous role as a voracious and intemperate wife. Her performance received positive reviews from critics and was awarded as the Best Villain at the 2nd Miadhu Crystal Award ceremony.

=== 2010–present:Niuma and professional expansion ===
Rasheedha's first release of 2010 was Abdul Faththaah's horror film Jinni alongside Ali Seezan and Mariyam Afeefa. Based on true incidents that occurred in an island of Maldives, she played the mother of Javid who has been enthralled by a ghost. Prior to release the film was marketed to be full of "suspense and uniqueness" compared to other mediocre Maldivian horror films. Upon release, the film received mixed reviews from critics; majority of them complaining for having the "same old feeling" of prior horror flicks though the performance were noted to be satisfactory. Despite the mixed reviews, the film witnessed a positive response at the box office, screening a total of twenty two housefull shows in Male', declaring it as a Mega-Hit. She next starred alongside Aishath Rishmy and Ahmed Azmeel in Rishmy's drama film Fanaa (2010), which was produced by Rasheedha. Based on a novel published by Ibrahim Waheed titled Balgish, she played the role of an austere mother. Upon release, the film received mixed to negative reviews from critics; Ali Naafiz from Haveeru Daily classified the film as the "worst Maldivian film released so far" during the year, criticising the performance of actors. However, other critics found the performance of Rasheedha to be on a "standing ovation" level, though displeased with the length of the film. At the 6th Gaumee Film Awards, she was bestowed with Best Costume Designer award while she was nominated as the Best Actress for her performance in the film.

She next starred in Niuma Mohamed's directorial debut drama film Niuma (2010) alongside an ensemble cast including Mohamed, Yoosuf Shafeeu, Sheela Najeeb, Mohamed Manik and Abdulla Muaz. She played the helpless mother of a daughter who has been sexually abused by her father and brother. She considered the role to be the most satisfying performance she has delivered so far. Upon release, the film met with widespread critical acclaim specifically complimenting the performance of actors and its dialogues. Being able to screen over thirty housefull shows of the film, it was declared a Mega-Hit at box office, and the highest grossing Maldivian release of the year. The film fetched her a Best Supporting Actress nomination at both, Enchanteur Maldives Film Awards 2012 and 6th Gaumee Film Awards ceremony. The last release of the year featured Rasheedha in Yoosuf Shafeeu's drama film Heyonuvaane (2010). The story revolves around a male who is victimised of domestic abuse. She played a heart patient and a mother of Ziyad, an impotent husband who has been discriminated and abused by her ferocious wife. The film received majorly negative reviews from critics, though her performance was commended. Twenty two housefull shows of the film were screened at cinema, declaring it a Mega-Hit and second highest grossing Maldivian release of the year.

The following year, Rasheedha first appeared in Aishath Ali Manik's romantic horror film Kuhveriakee Kaakuhey? (2011) opposite Ahmed Azmeel and Aishath Rishmy. Inspired by the horror romantic thriller Bollywood film Darling (2007), pre-production of the film was started in 2007 and shot in Sri Lanka. It revolves around a man who cheats on his wife with his secretary, and how his life slides to a haunting shift when he accidentally kills his mistress. The film received negative reviews from critics, while her performance was noted to be "acceptable". The film did little business at boxoffice and was declared a flop. Her next release was Ahmed Azmeel's debut direction Hiyy Yaara Dheefa (2011), starred alongside Ali Seezan, Niuma Mohamed, Ahmed Azmeel and Aishath Rishmy. The film received negative reviews from critics pointing similarities between Bollywood comedy-drama film Ishq (1997) and Kundan Shah's family drama Dil Hai Tumhaara (2002). The film revolves around four young people from different social classes fall in love with partners who do not meet with their parents' approval. She played Nahidha, a rich counselor who complicates the love life of her daughters. The film did not succeed financially, but her portrayal was moderately acclaimed by critics.

Rasheedha's first release of 2019 was the Moomin Fuad-directed psychological horror thriller Nivairoalhi (2019) which marks Niuma Mohamed's last onscreen film. Revolving around a patient suffering from depression, she played the mother of Riffath, the young husband helping his wife to overcome mood disorder. Starring opposite Mohamed, Yoosuf Shafeeu and Ahmed Asim, the film received majorly positive reviews from critics; Aishath Maaha of Dho? favored the performance of the lead actors and mentioned the "neat arrangement" of its screenplay though pointed out its "weak ending" to be unsatisfactory while her performance was noted to be "great as usual".

== Filmography ==
=== Feature film ===
Year	Title	Role	Notes	Ref(s)
1993	Mithuru			
1995	Dhushman	Seema		
1996	Haqqu	Madheeha	Special appearance	
1998	Ethoofaaneerey	Haseena		
1998	Amaanaaiy	Herself	Special appearance in picnic sequence	
1999	Umurah	Zulfa		
2000	Maazee	Zubeydha		
2000	Rihun	Saba		
2000	Himeyn Dhuniye	Shaheedha		
2001	Ranmuiy	Kuda Kamana		
2002	Aan... Aharenves Loabivin	Sara's mother		
2003	Kalaayaanulaa	Zulfa		
2003	Dhonkamana	Haleema		
2003	Vehey Vaarey Therein	Azim's mother		
2004	Hatharu Udhares	Adnan's mother		
2004	Sandhuravirey 2	Dhiyana's mother		
2006	Hukuru Vileyrey	Fauziyya Shakir	Also the producer and director	
2010	Jinni	Faheema		
2010	Fanaa	Zahira	Also the producer Nominated—Gaumee Film Award for Best Actress	
2010	Niuma	Wafiyya	Nominated—Gaumee Film Award for Best Supporting Actress; Nominated—Maldives Film Award for Best Supporting Actress	
2010	Heyonuvaane	Ziyad's mother		
2011	Kuhveriakee Kaakuhey?	—N/a		
2011	Hiyy Yaara Dheefa	Nahidha		
2019	Nivairoalhi	Waheedha		
2024	Mee Ishq	Saba's mother		
2025	Sorry	Maiz's mother	Special appearance	
2025	Loabin...?	Ameena		
2026	Dhevi	Ainthu	Special appearance	

=== Television ===
Year	Title	Role	Notes	Ref(s)
1994	Hithi Thajuribaa	Asma	Main role	
1997–1999	Kahthiri	Aminath	Main role; 49 episodes	
1998–1999	Aisha	Azima	Main role	
1999	Maafkuraashey	Mariyam's mother	Guest role; "Episode 5"	
2000	Dharifulhu	Wafiyya	Television film	
2000	Reysham	Athifa	Main role; 10 episodes	
2000	Dhoapatta	Mary's mother	Recurring role	
2003	Ujaalaa Raasthaa	Sobira	Main role; 5 episodes	
2003	Edhuvas En'buri Annaanenama	Niyaz's mother	Main role; 5 episodes	
2003	Dheewanaa Hiyy	Shaira	Main role; 5 episodes	
2003–2004	Vaisoori	Various roles	6 segments; 7 episodes	
2003–2004	Thiyey Mihithuge Vindhakee	Zuhura	Main role; 24 episodes	
2004–2005	Loabi Nulibunas	Khadheeja	Recurring role; 5 episodes	
2005	Fukkashi	Afiya	Episode: "Futboalha Foari"	
2005	Baiveriyaa	Fareedha	Main role; 11 episodes	
2005	Kalaage Haqqugaa	Waheedha	Main role	
2005–2006	Vairoalhi Ahves Sirrun	Seema	Main role; 52 episodes	
2006	Nethi Dhiyayas	Rasheedha	Main role; 5 episodes	
2006–2007	Vaguthu Faaithu Nuvanees	Jameela	Recurring role; 50 episodes	
2008	Hama Ekani Kalaayahtakai	Naail's mother	Main role; 5 episodes	
2008	Manzilakee Thee Ey Magey		Main role	
2015	Vakivumuge Kurin	Maisha's mother	Main role; 15 episodes	
2020	Huvaa	Zoya's mother	Recurring role	
2020	Ehenas	Shaira's mother	Guest role; Episode: "Status"	
2021	Hatharu Manzaru	Zahira	Voice-over in the segment "Hayaaiy"	
2023–2024	Yaaraa	Zainab Ahmed	Recurring role; 16 episodes	
2023	Girlfriends	Faathanik	Guest role; Episode: "Click Click Click"	

=== Short film ===
Year	Title	Role	Notes	Ref(s)
2007	Umurahvess Inthizaaru Kuraanan	Haseena	Also the writer	
2008	Farihibe 2	Khalidha		
2009	Haadhisaa			
2012	Haadhisaa 2			
2020	KKB: Kuda Kuda Baaru	Zahidha		

== Accolades ==
Year	Award	Category	Nominated work	Result	Ref(s)
2008	2nd Miadhu Crystal Award	Best Villain	Vaguthu Faaithu Nuvanees	Won	
2012	2nd Maldives Film Awards	Best Supporting Actress	Niuma	Nominated	
2015	6th Gaumee Film Awards	Best Actress	Fanaa	Nominated	
2015	6th Gaumee Film Awards	Best Supporting Actress	Niuma	Nominated	
2015	6th Gaumee Film Awards	Best Costume Design	Fanaa (shared with Aishath Rishmy, Ahmed Shiyam)	Won	
