= Sandhuravirey 2 =

- Official film poster
- Directed by: Amjad Ibrahim
- Written by: Moosa Saaid
- Screenplay by: Amjad Ibrahim
- Produced by: Ahmed Sharan Hassan
- Starring: Yoosuf Shafeeu; Niuma Mohamed
- Cinematography: Shiyaz
- Edited by: Ali Musthafa
- Music by: Mohamed Madheeh; Mohamed Faisal
- Production company: Dash Studio
- Release date: April 30, 2004
- Running time: 188 minutes
- Country: Maldives
- Language: Dhivehi

Sandhuravirey 2 is a 2004 Maldivian horror film directed by Amjad Ibrahim and the sequel to his previous horror film Sandhuravirey (2002). Produced by Ahmed Sharan Hassan under Dash Studio, the film stars Yoosuf Shafeeu and Mariyam Nisha reprising their role as Dhiyash and Yaasha respectively. Shafeeu also played the role of their son, while Niuma Mohamed, Zeenath Abbas and Mohamed Shavin were added to the cast.

== Premise ==
Dhiyash (Yoosuf Shafeeu) and Yaasha's second daughter, who possess features aligned more to her mother's origin, grows up to be another jinn (Sheereen Abdul Wahid) who schemed to avenge her mother and sister's death on Dhiyash's family. She first murdered Shafqa (Mariyam Nisha), a human lookalike of Yaasha, and kept continuously hassling Dhiyash and Shafqa's son, an established actor, Nail (Yoosuf Shafeeu). Disguised as other people, she complicates Nail's relationship with his girlfriend, Maya (Niuma Mohamed).

== Cast ==
- Yoosuf Shafeeu as Nail / Dhiyash
- Niuma Mohamed as Maya
- Mohamed Shavin as Ayaz
- Sheereen Abdul Wahid as jinn
- Zeenath Abbas as Dhiyana
- Mariyam Nisha as Shafqa / Yaasha
- Aminath Rasheedha as Dhiyana's mother
- Fauziyya Hassan as Maya's mother
- Neena Saleem as Jauza
- Ahmed Saeed as Matheenu
- Hamid Ali as Doctor (special appearances)

== Soundtrack ==
Track listing
| No. | Title | Lyrics | Singer(s) | Length |
|---|---|---|---|---|
| 1. | "Masthee Dhe Hiyy" | Ahmed Haleem | Shifa Thaufeeq, Abdul Baaree |
| 2. | "Magey Jaaney Thee" | Ahmed Haleem | Mukhthar Adam, Shifa Thaufeeq |
| 3. | "Sandhuravirey Vaudheh Kuraamee" | Ahmed Haleem | Mukhthar Adam, Shifa Thaufeeq |
