= Mariyam Shakeela (actress) =

Maldivian film actress

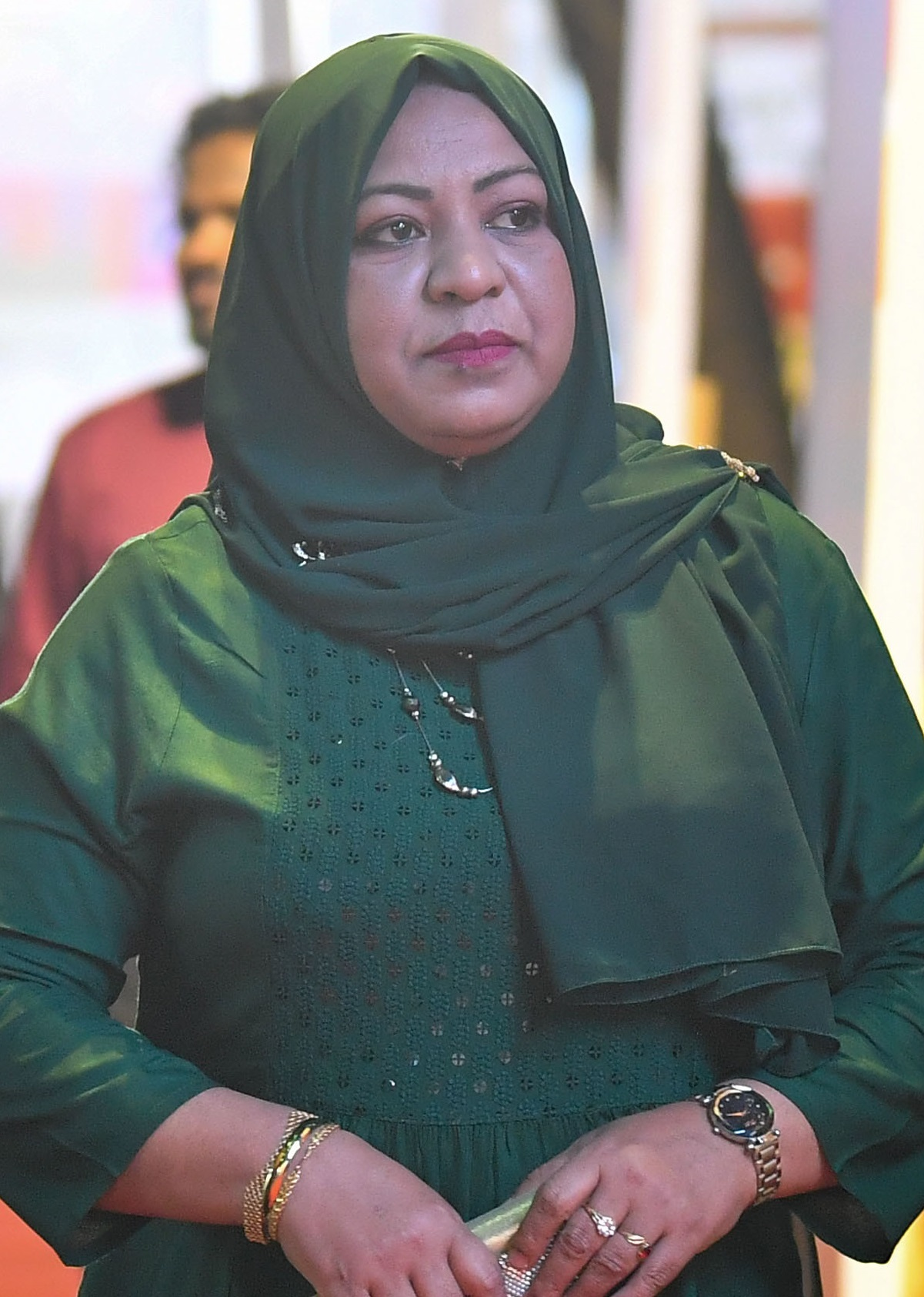
- Shakeela attending Olympus reopening ceremony, 2023
- Occupation: Actress
- Years active: 1992–present

Mariyam Shakeela is a Maldivian film actress.

== Career ==
=== 1992–2007: Early releases ===
After completing her education in MCS and EPS, Shakeela married to comedian Yoosuf Rafeeu who was then a producer and news presenter at Television Maldives. A week after their marriage, Rafeeu requested her to feature in a film for a replacement of an actor who opted out of the film for personal reasons. At the age of fifteen, she made her screen debut with the film Dhon Sanpa, whose performance was well noted by critics and audiences. In 1992, Shakeela collaborated with Rafeeu for his drama film, Loabi Veveynee Furaana Dheegen followed by another collaboration with Yoosuf Rafeeu for his tragedy drama film Vaudhu (1993) which narrates the separation of a happy couple due to the societal differences. Yoosuf Rafeeu's award-winning film Haqqu was released in 1996, in which Shakeela was featured as Areesha, a faithful wife who suffers from an unhappy marriage. The film revolving around a man who is forced to marry a woman against his will, stars Nisha, Reeko Moosa Manik and Mariyam Shakeela in lead roles. The film received positive reviews from critics. This was followed by the Yoosuf Rafeeu's comedy film Nibu (1996), an unofficial remake of Gulzar's Bollywood comedy film Angoor (1982), which focuses on two pairs of identical twins separated at birth and how their lives go haywire when they meet in adulthood.

In 2000, she played the sister of Nasiha, an attractive young woman in a relationship with a married man and a patient suffering from congenital heart disease in Abdul Faththaah's television drama series Dhoapatta. Starring alongside Mohamed Shavin, Jamsheedha Ahmed, Sheela Najeeb and Niuma Mohamed, the series centers on unrequited love and complications of a relationship within and beyond marriage. Two years later, she played the role of Nahidha, a widow who starts an extra-marital affair with a womanizer in Abdul Faththaah's directorial film debut, Himeyn Dhuniye (2000) which received positive reviews from critics. The same year, she starred opposite Reeko Moosa Manik in the Easa Shareef-directed romantic horror film 2000 Vana Ufan Dhuvas (2000), in which she portrays the role of a helpless pregnant wife who discovers her husband having an affair with a younger and much prettier woman. She was applauded for her performance as the helpful sister, in the Abdul Faththaah-directed critically acclaimed television series, Thiyey Mihithuge Vindhakee (2003) which was considered as one of the best series production in television industry.

Abdul Faththaah's horror film Eynaa was released in 2004, in which appears Sheela Najeeb, Mohamed Manik, Ahmed Shah, Didi, Ibrahim Jihad and Nashidha Mohamed as six colleagues who go on a picnic to a haunted uninhabited island and their battle for survival. She played the wife murdered by his husband when she discovers his illicit affair and becomes a spirit who kills everyone landing on the island. The film garnered critical appreciation especially for its technical department and was a commercial success.

In 2005, she rose to widespread prominence in the television industry with her performance as an overprotective mother in the Arifa Ibrahim-directed critically acclaimed television series, Vairoalhi Ahves Sirrun (2005) which revolves around two best-friends involved in extra-marital affairs and who fail to practice their duty as husband and wife. Starring alongside Niuma Mohamed, Ahmed Asim, Aminath Rasheedha and Lufshan Shakeeb, the series was listed as one of the most successful television series. The following year, she again collaborated with the team of Vairoalhi Ahves Sirrun for Arifa Ibrahim's another romantic television drama series, Vaguthu Faaithu Nuvanees (2006) which consists of fifty episodes. The series which follows the vengeance and retribution two best-friends go through when they both love the same person, features Shakeela in a recurring role as a first-wife seeking the love and affection from her husband.

=== 2009–14: Breakthrough and mature roles ===
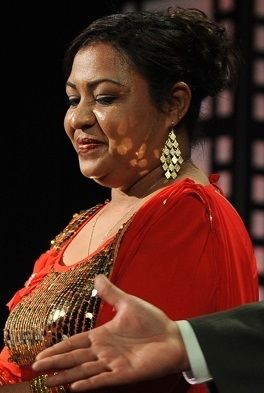
Shakeela at 3rd Maldives Film Awards ceremony, 2014

In 2009, Shakeela collaborated with Amjad Ibrahim for his horror film Baaraige Fas, cast alongside Mariyam Nisha, Hussain Sobah, Amira Ismail, Ali Shameel and Ahmed Azmeel. The film follows a temptress vampire who goes into a killing spree to quench her thirst. Shakeela played the role of Samiya, an infertile woman who miraculously gets pregnant by smelling a rose. The film received mainly negative reviews.

In 2011, Shakeela played the role of Zahira, a religious mother trying to save her son and her failing marriage, in the Moomin Fuad-directed crime tragedy drama Loodhifa. Featuring an ensemble cast, the film deals with current social issues in society told from the different perspectives of the characters. Made on a budget of MVR 600,000, the film was declared a commercial failure though it received wide critical acclaim. It was followed by Amjad Ibrahim's suspense thriller film Hafaraaiy where Shakeela starred alongside Ali Shameel, Amira Ismail, Yoosuf Shafeeu and Fathimath Fareela, which was a critical and commercial failure. Based on a real incident, the film narrates a story of a cannibal woman who is addicted to eating human flesh, how she victimised the inhabitants with her face covered in a veil. The film received criticism for its "fragile" plot, "unnecessary" characters though its makeup was appreciated. Ahmed Naif from Sun wrote: "neither scientifically nor psychologically, its been proven in the film how a chicken addict turns to be a cannibal. The film slides from a suspense thriller to a comedy for its inclusion of inconceivable details".

In 2012, Shakeela played a cunning step-mother in the Ravee Farooq-directed romantic drama film Mihashin Furaana Dhandhen opposite Niuma Mohamed, Mohamed Manik and Ali Seezan. Upon release, the film received a mixed response from critics while her performance was recognised positively. Ahmed Nadheem of Haveeru noted the film as "the best Maldivian melodramatic film" he had seen in the past two years, though was displeased with its similarities between two Bollywood films. Her portrayal of Wadheefa in the film resulted in a Maldives Film Awards nomination as the Best Supporting Actress.

She next starred in Abdul Faththaah's romantic drama Aadheys (2014), alongside Niuma Mohamed, Hussain Sobah, Amira Ismail, Fathimath Azifa, Moosa Zakariyya and Ali Azim. Filming was completed in 2011, though it was released three years following the death of film producer Hassain Ali. It revolves around a sacrificing mother and her affection towards her child. Upon release, the film received mixed reviews from critics and failed to leave an impression commercially.

=== 2017–present: Multiple releases and frequent collaborations ===
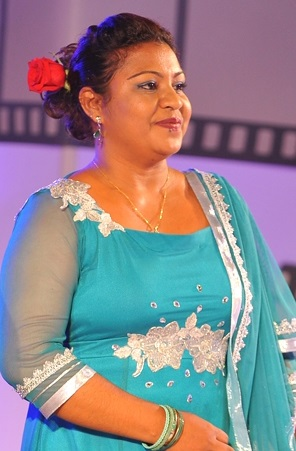
Shakeela at 2nd Maldives Film Awards ceremony, 2012

Shakeela's first release of 2017 came in the Ali Musthafa-directed family drama Malikaa. Featuring Nuzuhath Shuaib and Mohamed Jumayyil in the lead role, the film tells the story of the sidelined daughter, played by Shuaib, who manages the family. Despite low expectations from trade analysts, the film received mixed reviews and performed moderately at the box office. Abdul Faththaah's romantic drama Hahdhu (2017) was her next film release, playing the role of a prostitute. The film touched upon controversial issues in the Maldives including the depiction of flogging and also shines a light on mental health by featuring an attempted suicide. The film opened to mixed reviews from critics though it emerged as one of the highest grossing Maldivian films of the year.

2018 was a dull year for Maldivian film-industry with regards to 2018 Maldivian presidential election, though she had three film releases during the year. Her first film was a suspense thriller film Dhevansoora (2018) written and directed by Yoosuf Shafeeu. The film marks Shafeeu's thirtieth direction and features an ensemble cast of twenty-one actors. Revolving around a murder investigating, she played the mother of a boy suffering from dissociative identity disorder. The film received positive reviews from critics and was considered a "norm-breaker" for the Maldivian cinema. Ahmed Hameed Adam reviewing from VNews applauded Shakeela's performance although she had a small role in terms of screen time. She was featured alongside Mohamed Jumayyil, Mariyam Majudha and Nuzuhath Shuaib in Ali Shifau's family drama Vakin Loabin (2018). The film tells a story of a young couple's divorce and its impact on everyone involved. Upon release, the film met with positive response from critics, specifically praising the screenplay for toning down its melodrama and breaking from the stereotypes of its genre, and it was a commercial success. She then starred in the first Maldivian web-series, a romantic drama by Fathimath Nahula, Huvaa. The series consisting of sixty episodes and streamed through the digital platform Baiskoafu, centers around a happy and radiant family which breaks into despairing pieces after a tragic incident that led to an unaccountable loss. The series and her performance as an over-strict mother were positively received.

Shakeela's first release of 2019 was the Moomin Fuad-directed psychological horror thriller Nivairoalhi (2019) which marks Niuma Mohamed's last onscreen film. Revolving around a patient suffering from depression, she played the mother of Maana, the young wife suffering from mood disorder. Starring opposite Mohamed, Yoosuf Shafeeu and Ahmed Asim, the film received majorly positive reviews from critics; Aishath Maaha of Dho? favored the performance of the lead actors and mentioned the "neat arrangement" of its screenplay though pointed out its "weak ending" to be unsatisfactory while her performance was noted to be "great as usual". She then starred in Yoosuf Shafeeu's horror comedy film 40+ (2019), a sequel to 2017 released comedy film Naughty 40, which was well received both critically and commercially. Later during the year, the first Maldivian anthology film was released which featured her as a female perpetrator of sexual abuse in the segment directed by Abdul Faththaah, titled Dharifiri . The project was shot in 2013 and digitally released six years later due to several delays in post-production.

== Media image ==
In 2012, Shakeela was ranked at the fourth position in the list of "Best Actresses in Maldives" compiled by Haveeru.

== Filmography ==
=== Feature film ===
Year	Title	Role	Notes	Ref(s)
N/A	Dhon Sanpa	Dhon Sanpa		
1992	Loabi Veveynee Furaana Dheegen	Mariyam		
1993	Vaudhu	Fazla		
1996	Haqqu	Areesha		
1996	Nibu	Saleema		
2000	Himeyn Dhuniye	Nahidha		
2000	2000 Vana Ufan Dhuvas	Shakeela		
2001	Ranmuiy	Azza		
2004	Eynaa	Unnamed		
2009	Baaraige Fas	Samiya		
2010	Dhin Veynuge Hithaamaigaa	Herself	Special appearance in the song "Annaashey Hinithun Velamaa"	
2011	Loodhifa	Zahira		
2011	Hafaraaiy	Zahira		
2011	E Bappa	Atheefa		
2012	Mihashin Furaana Dhandhen	Wadheefa	Nominated—Maldives Film Award for Best Supporting Actress	
2014	Aadheys	Nifasha's mother-in-law		
2014	Hulhudhaan	Nurse		
2017	Malikaa	Salma		
2017	Hahdhu	Hamza's mother		
2018	Dhevansoora	Shiyana		
2018	Vakin Loabin	Khalidha		
2018	Reyvumun	Shahidha		
2019	Nivairoalhi	Arifa		
2019	Goh Raalhu	Aiman's aunt		
2019	40+	Gumeyra		
2020	Andhirikan	Fareedha		
2023	Nina	Shareefa		
2024	Udhabaani 2			
2025	Kan'bulo	Zaheena		
2025	Ilzaam	Zarifa		
2026	Gilan †	Thohira	Completed	

=== Television ===
Year	Title	Role	Notes	Ref(s)
2000	Reysham	Mariyam	Main role; 4 episodes	
2000	Dhoapatta	Nasiha's sister	Recurring role; 4 episodes	
2002	Fahu Fiyavalhu	Rahma	Recurring role; 5 episodes	
2003–2004	Thiyey Mihithuge Vindhakee	Zubeydha	Main role; 25 episodes	
2005–2006	Vairoalhi Ahves Sirrun	Wadheefa	Main role; 52 episodes	
2006–2007	Vaguthu Faaithu Nuvanees	Haneefa	Recurring role; 50 episodes	
2008	Hinithun Velaashey Kalaa	Mufeedha	Guest role; "Episode 43"	
2008	Manzilakee Thee Ey Magey		Main role	
2009	Mihithah Loabi Dheyshey	Nafeesa	Main role; 15 episodes	
2010	Sirrun Hithaa Kulhelaafa	Faruhana	Main role; 10 episodes	
2012–2013	Adhives Eloaibah Gadharu Kuran	Aasha	Main role	
2018–2020	Huvaa	Zubeydha	Main role	
2019	Mhendhan	Sakeena	Main role; 4 episodes	
2019	Hatharu Halha	Afeefa	In the segment "Dharifiri"	
2020	Gamini	Sobeeha	Main role; 5 episodes	
2021	Nafsu	Afiya	Main role; 10 episodes	
2021	Girlfriends	Wafira	Guest role; "Episode: Murderer"	
2022–2023	Lafuzu	Samihtha	Recurring role; 32 episodes	
2022	Biruveri Vaahaka	Muna	Main role; Episode: "Phone Call" and "Lakunu"	
2022	Netheemey	Zuleykha	Recurring role; 5 episodes	
2025	Loaiybahtakaa	Rifa's mother	Main role; 6 episodes	

=== Short film ===
Year	Title	Role	Notes	Ref(s)
2007	Magey Dharifulhu	Principal	Special appearance	
2010	Nu Ufan Dhari	Hawwaidhee		

== Accolades ==
Year	Award	Category	Nominated work	Result	Ref(s)
2008	2nd Miadhu Crystal Award	Best Mother	Vaguthu Faaithu Nuvanees	Won	
2014	3rd Maldives Film Awards	Best Supporting Actress	Mihashin Furaana Dhandhen	Nominated	
2025	1st MSPA Film Awards	Best Supporting Actor – Female	Nivairoalhi	Nominated	
