= Mukhthar Adam =

Maldivian singer

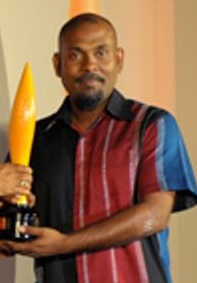
- Adam at 2nd SunFM Awards ceremony, 2010
- Born: 30 May 1971 (age 54); GA. Dhaandhoo, Maldives
- Occupation: Playback singer
- Years active: 1997–2012
- Musical career
- Genres: Pop; filmi; electronic
- Instrument: Vocals

Mukhthar Adam (30 May 1971) is a Maldivian singer.

== Career ==
Born in GA. Dhaandhoo, Adam initiated his career as a musician by joining a local band to take part in some of the occasional stage shows held in his island and atoll. He rose to prominence in the year 1999, where he released the studio albums Husreethi and Nadhuru which all went to become a huge success. This led to Mukhthar receiving several offers from music directors and his voice was heard in several albums released during the year 2000 to 2006.

In 2002, the Government of Maldives honoured him with the National Award of Recognition. In 2008, Mukhthar released his album Fini Roalhi which was considered a moderate success. However, with the fading demand for studio albums, he slowly become detached from the music releases. After his appearance in Ehan'dhaanugai Retro (2011) with the song "Than Dheyshiey Mithuraaey" alongside Mariyam Shaliya, he disappeared from the musical scene and was more involved in politics. "E Hoadhi Ufaathakaa" from the album Arutha (1998), "Loabin Hoadhan Erey" from Dhanmaanu (1998), "Goalhi Goalhi Kanmathin" from Soora (2000) and "Hinithun Velaashey Kalaa" from the series of the same name (2006) and remain as some of his most popular releases in his career.

Despite stepping away from the musical scene for personal reasons, many of his songs remain popular even after several years of its release. In 2018, Mukhthar was ranked at sixth in the list of the "Most Desired Comeback Voices", compiled by Dho?. In 2020, he was ranked at the tenth position in the list of "Most Listened Vocalist of 2020" compiled by the music streaming platform, Lavafoshi, marking him as the third playback singer to be featured in the list after Ali Rameez and Umar Zahir.

== Discography ==
=== Feature film ===
Year	Film	Song	Lyricist(s)	Co-artist(s)	Notes
1998	Fahuneyvaa	"Hin'gaashey Hin'gaashey"		Shifa Thaufeeq	
1999	Leykokaa	"Maafkuraashey Mi Beyzaaru"	Easa Shareef	Shifa Thaufeeq	
1999	Umurah	"Abadhu Abadhume Gislaa"	Boi Ahmed Khaleel	Solo	
2000	Maazee	"Kan'buloa Boli Hilanyaa"		Fazeela Amir	Appears in Soundtrack album
2000	Maazee	"Mee Dhurun Libey"		Solo	Appears in Soundtrack album
2000	Himeyn Dhuniye	"Baakeeve Loabi Fasdheefiyey"	Mohamed Amir Ahmed	Solo	
2000	Himeyn Dhuniye	"Farive Finifenmalaa"	Mohamed Amir Ahmed	Solo	
2000	Himeyn Dhuniye	"Nuruhunve Furagas Dheefaa"	Mausoom Shakir	Ibrahim Nifar	Appears in Soundtrack album
2000	Majubooru Loabi	"Mirey Gaathugaa Hurumey"		Fazeela Amir	
2000	Majubooru Loabi	"Bune Anga Anga Angaa"		Shifa Thaufeeq	
2002	Loabi Nuvevununama	"Dhiriulhumakee Fahe Kobaa"	Boi Ahmed Khaleel	Solo	
2002	Aan... Aharenves Loabivin	"Baakeevumun Hiyy"	Mausoom Shakir	Fathimath Rauf	
2002	Aan... Aharenves Loabivin	"Fenumun Govaalee"	Mausoom Shakir	Fazeela Amir	Appears in Soundtrack album
2002	Aan... Aharenves Loabivin	"Reethi Han'dhuvaree Reygaa"	Adam Haleem Adnan	Fazeela Amir	
2002	Hithu Vindhu	"Loabin Hoadhan Erey"		Aishath Inaya	
2003	Kalaayaanulaa	"Shakuvaa Mee"	Mausoom Shakir	Solo	
2003	Araamagu Dhonkamana	"Raivaru Kiyamun"	Kopee Mohamed Rasheed	Solo	
2003	Dhonkamana	"Dheyn Ufaa Vaaney"	Adam Haleem Adnan	Shifa Thaufeeq	
2003	Vehey Vaarey Therein	"Jaadhoogaa Jehijjey"	Easa Shareef	Aishath Inaya	
2003	Vehey Vaarey Therein	"Loabeege Nanves Kiyaaney"	Easa Shareef	Aishath Inaya	
2004	Sandhuravirey 2	"San'dhuravirey"	Ahmed Haleem	Shifa Thaufeeq	
2004	Sandhuravirey 2	"Magey Jaaney Thee"	Ahmed Haleem	Shifa Thaufeeq	
2004	Eynaa	"Moorithi Zuvaan Hinithun"	Ahmed Nashid	Aishath Inaya	
2004	Eynaa	"Thiya Loabi Mirey"	Ahmed Nashid	Solo	
2004	Eynaa	"Thihiyy Adhu"	Ahmed Nashid	Fazeela Amir	
2005	Viremun Midhaa Hiyy Magey	"Hiyy Dheefa Vaanee"	Easa Shareef	Solo	Unreleased
2005	Hureemey Inthizaarugaa	"Miadhu Ulhunas Mithaa"	Easa Shareef	Shifa Thaufeeq	
2005	Hureemey Inthizaarugaa	"Hiyy Furaadhey"	Easa Shareef	Shifa Thaufeeq	
2005	Hureemey Inthizaarugaa	"Haadhahaa Fariyey Thi Harakaaiy"	Easa Shareef	Solo	
2005	Hureemey Inthizaarugaa	"Maaiykalaakoaey"	Easa Shareef	Solo	
2005	Hureemey Inthizaarugaa	"Ulhenee Thi Dhurah Dhaan"	Easa Shareef	Mariyam Unoosha	
2006	Vaaloabi Engeynama	"Vaaloabi En'geynama" (Reprise Version)	Mohamed Abdul Ghanee	Solo	
2006	Vaaloabi Engeynama	"Hinithunvelaashey Kalaa"	Mohamed Abdul Ghanee	Solo	Appears in Soundtrack album
2010	Jinni	"Binmatheegaa Dhirihureemey"	Ismail Mubarik	Solo	
2010	Jinni	"Kalaa Fenumun Vaagothakun"		Solo	Appears in Soundtrack album
2011	Hiyy Yaara Dheefa	"Aadhey Loabivaa"	Ahmed Nashid	Shifa Thaufeeq	Appears in Soundtrack album

=== Short film ===
Year	Film	Song	Lyricist(s)	Co-artist(s)	Notes
2004	Dheke Dhekeves 1	"Fendaamatheegaa Hurey Kalaa"	Ahmed Nashid	Solo	
2004	Falhi Sikunthu 1	"Meheboobu Magey"		Fazeela Amir	
2005	Falhi Sikunthu 2	"Hoorehfadha Zuvaanaa"	Ahmed Nashid	Solo	
2006	Dheke Dhekeves 3	"Rankeemaa Thoathaa"	Mohamed Rasheed	Solo	
2006	Neha	"Yaaraanulaa"		Shifa Thaufeeq	
2007	Vigani	"Dhanvumun Kalhu An'dhirikan		Solo	
2008	Guest House Room Number:201	"Aawaaraakan Dheewaanaakan"		Solo	
2008	Guest House Room Number:201	"Meheboobu Magey"		Fazeela Amir	
2010	Loabeege Ninja	"Ishqeege Theerun"	Ismail Mubarik	Solo	
2010	Dhekafi	"Haaufaa Edhi Thibaa Dheynan"		Solo	
2011	Farihibe 3	"Maa Kan'duge Adiah"	Ahmed Falah	Solo	

=== Television ===
Year	Title	Song	Lyricist(s)	Co-artist(s)	Notes
1998	Leenaa	"Loabin Buney Aisbalaashey"		Fathimath Zoona	
1999	Aisha	"Roan Roanveehey Alhey"	Jaufar Abdul Rahuman	Fathimath Rauf	
1999	Maafkuraashey	"Hurin Rovifaa"		Solo	
2000	Dhoapatta	"Hoadhumah Dhaanan"	Easa Shareef	Shifa Thaufeeq	
2001	Dhanmaanu	"Chaalu Gumree"		Solo	
2004	Kamana Vareh Neiy	"Anhen Kujjaku Fenumun"		Solo	
2006	Kuramey Vadhaaee Salaam	"Loabin Kalaa Kaireegaa Vaanamey"	Mohamed Abdul Ghanee	Shifa Thaufeeq	
2006	Kuramey Vadhaaee Salaam	"Dhookoh Nudhey Kaireegaa Vey Magey"	Mohamed Abdul Ghanee	Shifa Thaufeeq	
2006	Hinithun Velaashey Kalaa	"Hinithun Velaashey Kalaa"	Mohamed Abdul Ghanee	Solo	
2006	Yaaraanulaa	"Yaaraanulaa"		Shifa Thaufeeq	
2009	Mohamma Gaadiyaa	"Ran'galhu Thedhuveri"		Solo	

=== Non-film songs ===
Year	Album / Single	Song	Lyricist(s)	Co-artist(s)
1996	Rasreethi	"Adhu Mikuree Saafu Ibaaraathun"		Solo
1996	Rasreethi	"Eynaa Dheken Goslaa Hithey"		Solo
1996	Rasreethi	"Vaanuhey Nafurathu Hithaaey"		Solo
1996	Rasreethi	"Fushun Magey Vee Kusheh"		Majeedha Ismail
1996	Rasreethi	"Heelamaa Hin'gaashey"		Majeedha Ismail
1997	Huvan'dhu	"Thin Reyge Nidheegaa"		Solo
1997	Huvan'dhu	"Dhin Loabi Netheemaa"		Solo
1997	Thasveeru	"Meygaavaa Ihusaasakun"		Solo
1998	Awara	"Bune Anga Anga Angaa"		Shifa Thaufeeq
1998	Awara	"Neyngivaa Baarakun"		Shifa Thaufeeq
1998	Arutha	"Ehoadhi Ufaathakaa"		Fazeela Amir
1998	Arutha	"Han'dhaan Aaveveythee"		Shifa Thaufeeq
1998	Arutha	"Reyrey Nimidhanee Mithaa"		Solo
1998	Dhanmaanu	"Loabin Hoadhan Erey"		Aishath Inaya
1998	Dhanmaanu	"Aan Faree Aan Faree"		Solo
1998	Hungaanu	"Vaa Jazubaathey Mee Loabin"		Shifa Thaufeeq
1998	Hungaanu	"Khiyaalugaa Ove Loa Merenee"		Solo
1998	Hungaanu	"Yaagoothu Fadha Ali Mooneh"		Solo
1998	Husreethi	"Vaadhuvahey Haaluga Jaanaa"		Solo
1998	Husreethi	"Dhen Thiyoa"		Solo
1998	Husreethi	"Loa Foaridhee Dhongomaa"		Solo
1998	Husreethi	"Loabeege Singaasanaa"		Solo
1998	Husreethi	"Thee Magey Vidhaa Han'dhey"		Solo
1998	Husreethi	"Loabin Buney Aisbalaashey" (Male Version)		Solo
1998	Husreethi	"Loabin Buney Aisbalaashey" (Duet Version)		Fathimath Zoona
1998	Nadhuru	"Sandhoakaa Kafunaa"		Solo
1998	Nadhuru	"Loabeege Thereygaa Haasvefaa"		Solo
1998	Nadhuru	"Keiyvaaneyhey Veemaa Dhen Nuruhun"		Solo
1998	Nadhuru	"Adhu Vee Roashey"		Solo
1998	Nadhuru	"Han'dhey Nooru Dhey Mee"		Solo
1998	Nadhuru	"Hurin Rovifaa"		Solo
1998	Nadhuru	"Nufuhdheyhaa Nadhuru Bunamun"		Solo
1998	Nadhuru	"Bosdhey Loabin"		Solo
1998	Nadhuru	"Haadha Asareh Kureyey"		Solo
1998	Nadhuru	"Mariyaadhukan Genuvaafa Hithah"		Solo
1998	Nadhuru	"Mamman Dhulakun"		Solo
1998	Nadhuru	"Ey Ey Ey Thiee Nazarey"		Solo
1999	Rahmedhu	"Dhurukollaafaa Vee"		Shereena
1999	Rahmedhu	"Loa Mee Themey" (Male Version)		Solo
1999	Rahmedhu	"Nuruheveneehey"		Solo
1999	Rahmedhu	"Loabivaa Beynun Hithaa"		Shifa Thaufeeq
1999	Rahmedhu	"Roan Roanveehey Alhey"		Fathimath Rauf
1999	Endheyyo	"Raskaraige Raanee"		Solo
1999	Endheyyo	"Seedhaa Seedhaa Dheynanhey"		Aishath Inaya
1999	Fariyaadhu	"Dhen Kiyaadheyshey Loabeege Raagugaa"		Solo
1999	Fariyaadhu	"Han'dhaa Thiya Han'dhuge Arihugaey"	Adam Haleem Adnan	Solo
1999	Farumaanu	"En'gi Feni Reethikamun"		Solo
1999	Farumaanu	"Vindhugaa Neiyme Yaareh"		Solo
1999	Fasreethi	"Guraafulhu Fileemaa"		Solo
1999	Fasreethi	"Furaa Ufaadhey Nooney E Loabin"		Solo
1999	Fasreethi	"Dhon Moonu Belee"		Solo
1999	Fasreethi	"Rissaa Meyge Hooney"		Solo
1999	Hithuvindhu	"Rankamanaa Madukollaa"	Abdulla Hameed Fahumee	Ahmed Fathuhee (Fathey)
1999	Hithuvindhu	"Annaanamey"		Ahmed Fathuhee (Fathey)
1999	Hithuvindhu	"Hithuvindhu"		Ahmed Fathuhee (Fathey)
1999	Hithuvindhu	"Roanu Nakathu Alifaan" (Version 2)		Ahmed Fathuhee (Fathey)
1999	Ishq	"Heylaa Dhanvarugaa Noolheyshey"	Adam Haleem Adnan	Fathimath Zoona
1999	Ishq	"Maleh Nala Reethi Thaazaa"	Adam Haleem Adnan	Solo
1999	Ishq	"Kalaa Dheke Varah Loabi"	Adam Haleem Adnan	Solo
1999	Ishq	"Hithuge Hithuge Malikaa"		Solo
1999	Ishq	"Dhin Hithah Aniyaathakaa"		Solo
1999	Ithaa	"Shabunam Ohey Gulzaarugaa"		Solo
1999	Ithaa	"Thee Edhey Hithey"		Shifa Thaufeeq
1999	Ithaa	"Mee Moosun Dhin Saafu Amaan"		Shifa Thaufeeq
1999	Kasthoori	"Vaa Dhuru Han'dhaanaa"		Shifa Thaufeeq
1999	Kasthoori	"Ey Rahumu Libey Insaanaa"		Solo
1999	Khiyaal	"Aafurey Loamerey"	Abdulla Hameed Fahumee	Solo
1999	Khiyaal	"Dheynvee Dheloa"	Abdulla Hameed Fahumee	Solo
1999	Khiyaal	"Erey Dhen Heelaa Hedhee"	Abdulla Hameed Fahumee	Solo
1999	Khiyaal	"Beyqaraarukan Vee Libifaa"		Solo
1999	Khiyaal	"Seedhaahey Balanvaanee"		Shifa Thaufeeq
1999	Khiyaal	"Maafkuraashey Mi Beyzaaru"	Easa Shareef	Shifa Thaufeeq
1999	Khiyaal	"Aslu Haalathu Buneveyhey"	Easa Shareef	Shifa Thaufeeq
1999	Malakaa	"Hoadhumah Dhaanan"	Easa Shareef	Shifa Thaufeeq
1999	Malakaa	"Hiyy Edheythee Naseebey Nethee"		Shifa Thaufeeq
1999	Malakaa	"Jaadhoogarekey Thee"		Solo
1999	Raaya	"Asaru Moonu Fenifaa"		Solo
1999	Raaya	"Yaareh Kobaihey Thiya Noonee"		Solo
1999	Raaya	"Jismu Abadhugaa"		Solo
1999	Rukkuri	"Merifavee Dheloa Hulhuvee"	Easa Shareef	Solo
1999	Rukkuri	"Rukkuri Kolheh Fadha Dhongomaa"	Boi Ahmed Khaleel	Solo
1999	Rukkuri	"Haamakuraaneehey"	Boi Ahmed Khaleel	Shifa Thaufeeq
1999	Shikaara	"Ey Farivaa Naazukee Malaaey"	Ahmed Shakeeb	Solo
1999	Singaa	"Bulbul Ehee Dheynuhey"	Mohamed Khaleel	Solo
1999	Singaa	"Chaalu Mainaa"		Solo
1999	Singaa	"Faruvaa Dheyshey"		Solo
1999	Singaa	"Gendhey Bunamey"		Solo
1999	Singaa	"Saamaraa Dhooni Shaahee"		Solo
1999	Singaa	"Singaa Kollaifiye Shikaar"		Solo
1999	Vara	"Adhu Mi Dhuniyeyge Oivaru"	Kopee Mohamed Rasheed	Solo
1999	Vara	"Hasheegaa Hey Huree Viyyaa"	Kopee Mohamed Rasheed	Solo
2000	Bolirava	"Dherey Vee Gos Nidheegaa"		Solo
2000	Bolirava	"Abadhu Mi Veynee Kehithoa"		Solo
2000	Nihaa	"Zuvaan Thiya Reethi Soorain"		Solo
2000	Nihaa	"Mi Loabi Maazeeve Dhaaney"	Easa Shareef	Solo
2000	Nihaa	"Dhekey Hiyyvey Nikan"		Solo
2000	BulBul	"Miee Loabi Dhey Inzaaru"	Adam Haleem Adnan	Solo
2000	BulBul	"Malaa Thiya Maa Nuvaanama"		Solo
2000	Dhoapattaa	"Habeebee Habeebee"		Solo
2000	Dhoapattaa	"Naazukee Thiya Fari Malun"		Solo
2000	Endheri	"Saalu Lee Molheegaa"		Solo
2000	Endheri	"Dhinhaa Loabi Dheynuthoaey"		Solo
2000	Esfiya	"Mirey Gaathugaa Hurumey"		Fazeela Amir
2000	Gumree	"Chaalu Gumree"		Solo
2000	Gumree	"Dheewaanaa Vevi Kiyaadhey Mee"		Solo
2000	Han'dhuvaree Rey	"Aadhey Marudhee Loabin"		
2000	Han'dhuvaree Rey	"Alathu Dharifulhu"		Solo
2000	Han'dhuvaree Rey	"Angaadheyshey Adhu Vee Ruhigen"		Solo
2000	Han'dhuvaree Rey	"Dhon Dhon Moonaa Meyaa"		Solo
2000	Han'dhuvaree Rey	"Ekamaa Bunaanee Keekey"		Solo
2000	Han'dhuvaree Rey	"Enme Funugaa Faaru Hileythee"		Solo
2000	Han'dhuvaree Rey	"Heefaa Athulaaney Dheefaaney"		Solo
2000	Han'dhuvaree Rey	"Hulhevi Han'dhuge Ufaa"		Solo
2000	Han'dhuvaree Rey	"Meyfaaru Beyzaaru"		Solo
2000	Han'dhuvaree Rey	"Ras Ainu Dhon Bibee"		Solo
2000	Han'dhuvaree Rey	"Reethee Huvafenugaa"		Solo
2000	Hinithun	"Heelan Edhemey"	Hussain Sobah	Solo
2000	Hinithun	"Kuree Loabeege Namugaa Samaasaa"	Mausoom Shakir	Solo
2000	Hiyala	"Naanaavee Seedhaa Loabi"		Solo
2000	Hiyala	"Fari Moonu Nivaa Nukuraashey"		Solo
2000	Hiyala	"Loaiybahtakaa Hiyythah Zuvaan"		Solo
2000	Kathiriyaa	"Udhuhey Vaigaa Havaagaa"	Adam Haleem Adnan	Solo
2000	Kathiriyaa	"Beynumey Haadhahaa"	Adam Haleem Adnan	Solo
2000	Kathiriyaa	"Maalu Ginaveetheeyey"		Solo
2000	Kathiriyaa	"Dhon Hiyala Magey"	Adam Naseer Ibrahim	Solo
2000	Khareef	"Vidhaa Alikan"	Adam Haleem Adnan	Solo
2000	Khareef	"Khiyaalugaa Mithuraage Fun"	Adam Haleem Adnan	Solo
2000	Khareef	"Haveerah Eki Maa Farivaaney"		Solo
2000	Koadi	"Naibun Ehrey Dhanvaru"		Solo
2000	Maaburu	"Konme Malakah Maaburu Annaaney"	Adam Haleem Adnan	Solo
2000	Maaburu	"Gandhee Gandhee Kuramey Huvaa"		Solo
2000	Rasrana	"Hinithun Thibaa Veleemaa"	Adam Haleem Adnan	Solo
2000	Rasrana	"Han'dhufadha Loa"		Solo
2000	Rasrana	"Midhimaa Balaaladheyshey"		Solo
2000	Rivethi	"Raivaru Kiyamun"	Kopee Mohamed Rasheed	Solo
2000	Rivethi	"Rasreethi Firaaleemaa"	Kopee Mohamed Rasheed	Solo
2000	Rivethi	"Ey Hithuge Yaaru Zuvaan"	Adam Haleem Adnan	Solo
2000	Rukkuri II	"Kiyaanee Fahe Keekeybaa"	Boi Ahmed Khaleel	Shifa Thaufeeq
2000	Rukkuri II	"Manaavi Athugaa Hifaakasheh"	Boi Ahmed Khaleel	Solo
2000	Rukkuri II	"Rani Paree Faalhuvey"	Adam Haleem Adnan	Solo
2000	Rukkuri II	"Thiyaey Mi Ufaadhey Raanee"	Beyya Huhthu	Solo
2000	Soora	"Shaheedhunge Zikuraa"	Adam Haleem Adnan	Ibrahim Nifar, Sanaa
2000	Soora	"Soora Feneythoa Dhaahiyvey"	Adam Haleem Adnan	Ibrahim Nifar
2000	Soora	"Finyaai Hoonaa"		Ibrahim Nifar
2000	Soora	"Vayaa Dhiyumun Nivaalaa"	Ismail Mubarik	Solo
2000	Soora	"Raarukeh Dhashugaa"		Solo
2000	Soora	"Goalhi Goalhi Kanmathin"	Ogaru Ibrahim Waheed	Solo
2001	Aimina	"Vaanuhey Seedhaa"	Mohamed Rasheed (Annaarey)	Shifa Thaufeeq
2001	Aimina	"Dheyshey Hiyy Dheyshey"	Mohamed Rasheed (Annaarey)	Shifa Thaufeeq
2001	BaaOdi	"Tharutheebu Thiya Nala Hin'gumaa"		Solo
2001	BaaOdi	"Hithugaa Vaathee Loabivaaey"		Solo
2001	Fattaru	"Dhurugaa Thihuree Keehveehey Saahibaa"	Ismail Shakeeb	Solo
2001	Fattaru	"Hiyy Edhey Reethi Raanee"	Ismail Shakeeb	Solo
2001	Gulfaam	"Behidhaane Oyaa"	Easa Shareef	Shifa Thaufeeq
2001	Haasil	"Ekeegaa Heydhavee Reyrey"		Solo
2001	Haasil	"Ujaalaa Moonaa"		Solo
2001	Kalaa	"Saadhavileyrey"	Ismail Mubarik	Solo
2001	Kalaa	"Malaa Fenifa Magey"	Hamdhoon Hameed	Solo
2001	Mendhan	"Veeloabi Neyngi Vakivee"	Ahmed Shakeeb	Solo
2001	Muthee	"Vakiveehey Nooraanee"		Solo
2001	Muthee	"Kurevey Loabin Shakuvaaey"		Solo
2001	Nayaa	"Thiyaey Magey Roohakee"	Adam Naseer Ibrahim	Shifa Thaufeeq
2001	Nayaa	"Wafaatherikan Netheemaa"		Shifa Thaufeeq, Mohamed Nasheed Moosa
2001	Nayaa	"Midhuvas Kalaa Genaimaa"		Solo
2001	Ranaa	"Fendaamatheegaa Hurey Kalaa"	Ahmed Nashid	Solo
2001	Ranaa	"Dhauruvaa Mihan'dhaanthah Ekee"		Solo
2001	Ranaa	"Neyngeyhey Husnuvaaney"		Solo
2001	Ranaa	"Bulhaa Bulhaa"		Solo
2001	Ranaa	"Hithaa Mi Furaana Ekugaa"		Solo
2001	Ranaa	"Hiyyheyo Nuvaane"		Solo
2001	Ranaa	"Dhuraa Dhuraa Gaathugaa"		Solo
2001	Ranaa	"Aadhey Kihineh Vee Ranaa"		Solo
2001	Ranaa	"Chaaley Chaaley"		Solo
2001	Ranaa	"Aharen Ruhey"		Solo
2001	Reyfanaa	"Hevifaa Moonu Feneythoa"		Solo
2001	Reyfanaa	"Balaanulaa Thiya Dhanee"	Abdulla Hameed Fahumee	Solo
2001	Rukkuri III	"Thiya Moorithi Adun"		Solo
2001	Sanaa	"Magey Nala Nala Gomaa"		Solo
2001	Sanaa	"Himeynun Ma Khiyaalu Kuramey"		Solo
2001	Sanaa	"Loaiybahtakaa Hiyythah Zuvaan"		Solo
2001	Sanaa	"Koafaa Veehey"		Solo
2001	Shoakh	"Nubeleyhe Kalaa Dhaathan"	Ahmed Shakeeb	Aishath Inaya
2001	Tharaanaa	"Kudhi Kudhivee Hithey"	Adam Haleem Adnan	Solo
2001	Tharaanaa	"Veyn Dheythee Hithi Mey Vireneeyey"	Adam Haleem Adnan	Solo
2001	Tharaanaa	"Maa Shaahee Thiya Reethi Lolun"	Adam Naseer Ibrahim	Solo
2002	Anaa	"Loabeege Asarun"		Solo
2002	Anaa	"Oagaavey Heevaathee"		Solo
2002	Anaa	"Loabeegaa Vee Goiyhey"		Solo
2002	Anaa	"Dhekey Hiyyvey Nikan" (Remix Version)		Solo
2002	Anaa	"Madukollan Gaathugaa"		Lahufa Faiz
2002	E' Kamanaa	"Loabeega Yaaru"	Hussain Sobah	Solo
2002	Foari	"Sahtha Faharuves Beluney"	Abdulla Hameed Fahumee	Solo
2002	Foari	"Fari Paree"		Solo
2002	Guraha	"Vidhaa Gurahaige Tharithahves"	Adam Haleem Adnan	Solo
2002	Guraha	"Hithugaavaa Loaiybeh Sirrukuran"	Ahmed Shakeeb	Solo
2002	Hithakah	"Malakahtakaa Kokaaleh"		Solo
2002	Hithakah	"Marudheefa Ulhey Mee Faharekey"		Solo
2002	Hithakah	"Hiya Ufaavee Rey"		Aishath Inaya
2002	Aisha Rani	"Aadhanaa Koifulhaa"		Solo
2002	Aisha Rani	"Dhusheemeh Noonhey Beachun"		Solo
2002	Jazbaath	"Ranfulhu Niyanethi"	Adam Haleem Adnan	Solo
2002	Jazbaath	"Thiya Khiyaal Kuraahiyy Veyey"	Adam Haleem Adnan	Fathimath Zoona
2002	Kashfu	"Dheewaanaa Kuruvaa Soora"		Solo
2002	Kashfu	"Dhanvumun Kalhu An'dhirikan"		Solo
2002	Lily	"Madumadun Hunnaanee Mihithaamaigaa"		Solo
2002	Lily	"Anhen Kujjaku Fenumun"		Solo
2002	Moahiru	"Kuraashey Asaru"	Ahmed Sharumeel	Solo
2002	Naash	"Loabi Nethuneebaaey"	Ismail Mubarik	Solo
2002	Nazaru	"Bas Bunaane Hiyvareh"		Solo
2002	Nazaru	"Wafaatheri Reethi Madumolhi"		Solo
2002	Nazaru	"Reethi Han'dhuvaree Reygaa"	Adam Haleem Adnan	Fazeela Amir
2002	Oivaru	"Thiya Goma Feni Aashoakhuvey"		Solo
2002	Oivaru	"Alah Dhoani Beylee"		Solo
2002	Oivaru	"Innan Ma Edhey Dhongomaa"		Solo
2002	Raasthaa	"Faiymini Kamanaa"		Solo
2002	Raasthaa	"Dhuniyeyn Miadhu Bikavaan Jehunee"		Ibrahim Nifar
2002	Raasthaa	"Hurihaa Kathun"		Various Artists
2002	Ran Han'dhu	"Dhaaney Gaimey Nethi Dhaaney"		Solo
2002	Ran Han'dhu	"Loabin Mi Dhekey Huvafenthakugaa"		Solo
2002	Ran Han'dhu	"Hoadhenee Hoadhenee Fari Lily"		Solo
2002	Reethi Abadhuves Reethi	"Hithaa Ma Veemey"		Solo
2002	Thun'di	"Heylaa Dhevey Hen'dhunaa"		Solo
2002	Thun'di	"Baazaarah Dhaan Hin'gaalan Dhaan"		Aminath Ibrahim
2002	Vakivumuge Kurin	"Hiyy Edhey Mithuraa"		Solo
2002	Vakivumuge Kurin	"Nooreenaa"		Solo
2002	Vakivumuge Kurin	"Dhoovedhaaney"		Solo
2003	Fathevare	"Thihaa Farikan Nuveyey"		Solo
2003	Kinaaree	"Visnaabalaashey Nooraa"		Solo
2003	Kinaaree	"Dheyn Ufaa Vaaney"	Adam Haleem Adnan	Shifa Thaufeeq
2003	Hiyy Roavarun	"Yaaru Hutteyshey Goveemaa"		Solo
2003	Hiyy Roavarun	"Loabin Aadhey Magey Dharifulhu"		Solo
2003	Hiyvaru	"Noashun Rovey Mee Haaley"		Solo
2003	Hiyvaru	"Beywafaa Beywafaa"		Solo
2003	Hiyvaru	"Bunanhey Reethi Zuvaanaa"		Solo
2003	Hiyvaru	"Aawaaraakan Dheewaanaakan"		Solo
2003	Hiyvaru	"Ey Magey Mithuraaey"		Solo
2003	Hiyvaru	"Thiya Reethi Fari Zuvaanaa"		Solo
2003	Hiyvaru	"Han'dhufadha Loa"		Solo
2003	Hiyvaru	"Ehan'dhaaney Ehan'dhaaney"		Solo
2003	Hiyvaru	"Meheboobu Magey"		Fazeela Amir
2003	Hiyvaru	"Heelaa Beleemaa"		Fazeela Amir
2003	Laal Heeraa	"Fariyey Ajaibuvaahaa"		Solo
2003	Laal Heeraa	"Vayaa E Kulhelaa Zaathun"		Solo
2003	Laal Heeraa	"Disco Lavaset"		Abdul Baaree, Hassan Ilham, Shifa Thaufeeq
2003	Maana	"Maa Loabivaa Hoadhenee"		Solo
2003	Maana	"Loabin Hithaa Kulhefa"		Solo
2003	Rahum	"Han'dhaan Aavey Netheemaa"		Solo
2003	Rahum	"Yaaraa Aeemaa"	Boi Ahmed Khaleel	Aishath Inaya
2003	Rahum	"Haalu Bunedhemun Mirey"	Boi Ahmed Khaleel	Aishath Inaya
2003	Rahum	"Hithugaa Han'dhaan"		Aishath Inaya
2003	Rama	"Ulhey Haalu Angaa"		Solo
2003	Rama	"Ithuruvey Hoonu"		Solo
2003	Rama	"Himeynun Ma Khiyaalu Kuramey"		Solo
2004	Jaadhooga Jeheyne	"Mendhan Vumun Mihaa"	Ahmed Nashid	Fazeela Amir
2004	Dhonaa	"Chaaley Bunanhey Huvaa"		Solo
2004	Dhonaa	"Vas Filaa Nudhanees Malun"		Solo
2004	Dhonaa	"Fari Fari Reethi Malaaey"		Solo
2004	Dhonaa	"Inthihaa Loabiveemaa"		Aishath Inaya
2004	Fari Kan'bulo	"San'dhuravirey"	Ahmed Haleem	Shifa Thaufeeq
2004	Fari Kan'bulo	"Magey Jaaney Thee"	Ahmed Haleem	Shifa Thaufeeq
2004	Fari Kan'bulo	"Loabin Hoadhan Erey"		Aishath Inaya
2004	Fenmeeru	"Ey Huttibalaa Heyonuvaaney"	Abdulla Hameed Fahumee	Solo
2004	Fenmeeru	"Ufaadhey Roohun"	Ismail Huzam	Solo
2004	Yaaraa	"Yaaraa Fenuneemaa"	Ahmed Nashid	Solo
2004	Hooru	"Dhuruvumeh Neydhemey"		Fathimath Rauf
2004	Ihusaas	"Hiydhathi Nukurey"		Fathimath Zoona
2004	Ithubaaru	"Shakkuvanyaa Kalaa"	Abdulla Muaz Yoosuf	Solo
2004	Saahil	"Thiya Loabi Mirey"	Ahmed Nashid	Solo
2004	Saahil	"Moorithi Zuvaan Hinithun"	Ahmed Nashid	Aishath Inaya
2004	Saahil	"Thihiyy Adhu"	Ahmed Nashid	Fazeela Amir
2004	Mariyaadhu	"Ey Magey Aashiqaaey"		Solo
2004	Vidhaathari	"Vaaney Ufaa"	Abdul Muhaimin	Rafiyath Rameeza
2004	Vidhaathari	"Miee Loabi Thoathaaey"	Abdul Muhaimin	Solo
2004	Zamaan	"Izzaiy Mulhin Nagaalaa"	Boi Ahmed Khaleel	Solo
2004	Zamaan	"Dhivehinge Lobuvethi Wathan"	Boi Ahmed Khaleel	Solo
2004	Ehan'dhaanugai...	"Jaazubee Asarugadha"		Solo
2005	Dhilaasaa	"Dhilaasaaey Hithah Libenee"	Adam Haleem Adnan	Solo
2005	Dhilaasaa	"Ehaa Loabin Ekee Ulhefaa"	Ahmed Nashid	Solo
2005	Fari Goma	"Kalaa Nuruhenhey"	Adam Haleem Adnan	Shifa Thaufeeq
2005	Fari Goma	"Reyrey Mi Masthee"		Mariyam Unoosha
2005	Fari Goma	"O Raanee Raanee"	Ahmed Haleem	Aminath Nashidha
2005	Bingaa	"Thiya Yaaraa Neydhey Hithekey"		Solo
2005	Hiyy Dheefaa	"Jaanudhee Jaanudhee"		Aminath Nashidha
2005	Hilan	"Naadhey Ninjeh Kalaa"		Solo
2005	Hilan	"Fari Gomaa"		Solo
2005	Hilan	"Ey Loabivaa Gulhigen Ekee"		Solo
2005	Leyfavethi	"Vaguthuthah Faaithu Veyey"	Amir Saleem	Solo
2005	Kuri Inthizaarugai... (VCD)	"Hiyy Ruhey Moonakee Thee"		Solo
2005	Ranthari	"Roadhivanyaa Hoadhaa Hiyvey"		Solo
2005	Ranthari	"Iraadhaigaa Vanee Viyyaa"		Solo
2005	Ranthari	"Ruhenyaa Loabi Kulunaa Dhee"		Solo
2005	Ranthari	"Gendhaashey Thibaa Jaanaa"		Solo
2005	Ranthari	"Maleh Farive Folhumun"		Solo
2005	Ranthari	"Hithaaey Maafu Edhemey"		Solo
2005	Ranthari	"Nukulheyshey Zuvaan Yaaru"		Solo
2005	Ranthari	"Vakivee Hithaamain"		Solo
2005	Ranthari	"Loabinney Beynunvey" (Bonus Song)		Solo
2005	Maahiyaa	"Sirru Veveyhey"	Adam Naseer Ibrahim	Solo
2005	Single	"Suvaal Kurey Yaaru"		Aishath Inaya
2005	Varah Loabivey (VCD)	"Ey Magey Sindhithaa"		Muneer
2005	Thin Thin Ban'diyaa	"Faalhuvelee"		Solo
2005	Thin Thin Ban'diyaa	"Bunamey Ufaa"		Solo
2005	Thin Thin Ban'diyaa	"Konkameh Vaanehey Hithaa"		Solo
2005	Thin Thin Ban'diyaa	"Thin Thin Ban'diyaaey"		Ibrahim Nifar
2005	Zuvaanaa	"Fariyey Zuvaanaa"		Solo
2005	Yaa' Habeys	"Hoorehfadha Zuvaanaa"	Ahmed Nashid	Solo
2006	Yaaraa 3	"Keehvehey Mihen Mivee"	Ahmed Nashid	Aishath Inaya
2006	Fari Dheyliyaa	"Dheiru Dhe Dhalhayah"		Solo
2006	Hiyy Dheewaanaa 3	"Hiyy Aawaaraakoh"	Ahmed Nashid	Fathimath Zoona
2006	Jism	"Annaaney Foni Boalaaney"	Ahmed Inaaz	Solo
2006	Keehve..?	"Faruvaave Loabin Athugaa"	Ismail Nazim	Solo
2006	Kisthee	"Yaaraaey Bunebalaashey"		Solo
2006	Kisthee	"Thiya Huri Nalakan Dhusheemey"		Solo
2006	Yaaraanulaa	"Yaaraanulaa"		Shifa Thaufeeq
2006	Yaaraanulaa	"Yaaraanulaa" (Remix Version)		Shifa Thaufeeq
2006	Yaaraanulaa	"Hoadhi Nooru"		Solo
2006	Mihan'dhaanugai...	"Aan Kiyaa Ulhunu Hiyvaru"		Solo
2006	Oh' Salhi	"Rankeemaa Thoathaa"	Kopee Mohamed Rasheed	Solo
2007	Thihan'dhaanugai...	"Mee Kiyaa Raagakee"	Hussain Rasheed	Solo
2008	Fini Roalhi	"Baby I Love You"		Solo
2008	Fini Roalhi	"Roalhin Beehey"		Solo
2008	Fini Roalhi	"Hayaathuge Dhathurugaa"		Solo
2008	Fini Roalhi	"Hiyy Edhey Manziley"		Solo
2008	Fini Roalhi	"Mey Furidhey Loabin"		Solo
2008	Fini Roalhi	"Haaufaa Edhi Thibaa Dheynan"		Solo
2008	Fini Roalhi	"Jaadhuvee Adhaa"		Solo
2008	Fini Roalhi	"Magey Haalu Kihineh Bunedheynee"		Solo
2008	Fini Roalhi	"Masha Allah"		Solo
2008	Fini Roalhi	"Adhu Vanee Dhaahithey"		Mariyam Ashfa
2008	Fini Roalhi	"Haas Hithaamain" (Bonus Song)		Mohamed Abdul Ghanee
2008	Thihan'dhaanugai Remix	"Eheelun Dheken"		Solo
2009	Adhives... Loabivey	"Loabin Kalaa Kaireegaa Vaanamey"	Mohamed Abdul Ghanee	Shifa Thaufeeq
2009	Fari Kamana	"O Raanee Raanee"	Ahmed Haleem	Aminath Nashidha
2009	Hiyy Furendhen	"Hithuge Nazarey Thiee"		Aishath Inaya
2009	Shaahee Kamana	"Gulhaalaashey Vee Hiyy Hithaa"		Shifa Thaufeeq
2009	Ehan'dhaanugai Duet	"Govaalee Kaaku Kaaku"		Aminath Nashidha
2009	Vaahan'dhaanakun	"Vaahan'dhaanakun Rovenee" (Male Version)		Solo
2009	Vaahan'dhaanakun	"Dhiyavaiy Ran'galhu Odi"		Solo
2009	Vaahan'dhaanakun	"Paris Evening"		Solo
2009	Vaahan'dhaanakun	"Vaahan'dhaanakun Rovenee" (Group Version)	Mohamed Amir Ahmed	Various Artists
2010	Thin Fiya	"Ey Dhaaney Dhaaney"		Solo
2010	Ehan'dhaanugai Remix	"Ey Malaa Gulzaarugaa"		Nashidha Ahmed
2010	Vaahan'dhaanakun 2	"Nanaa Huvafen Dhusheemey"		Solo
2010	Vaahan'dhaanakun 2	"Loabi Loabin Asaru"	Mohamed Amir Ahmed	Rafiyath Rameeza
2010	Vaahan'dhaanakun 2	"Vaahan'dhanakun Rovenee" (Group Version)	Mohamed Amir Ahmed	Various Artists
2011	Leveythee Mi Neyvaa	"Vaa Jazubaathey Mee Loabin"		Shifa Thaufeeq
2011	Ehan'dhaanugai Retro	"Than Dheyshiey Mithuraaey"		Mariyam Shaaliya
2012	Edhuvasthah	"Hissuthakaa Kulheleemaa"	Ibrahim Shareef	Solo
2018	Single	"Merey Loa Dhekey Hoonaa" (Cover Version)	Kaneeru Abdul Raheem	Solo

=== Religious / Madhaha ===
Year	Album/single	Madhaha	Lyricist(s)	Co-artist(s)
2005	Asmaau Allah Al-Husnaa	"Asmaa Al-Husnaa"		Ibrahim Nifar
2005	Asmaau Allah Al-Husnaa	"Lavvaashi Salawaathaa Salaam"		Ibrahim Nifar
2005	Asmaau Allah Al-Husnaa	"Mohammed Musthafa"		Ibrahim Nifar
2005	Asmaau Allah Al-Husnaa	"Hamdhaa Sanaa"		Ibrahim Nifar
2005	Asmaau Allah Al-Husnaa	"Seedhaa Magun"		Ibrahim Nifar
2005	Asmaau Allah Al-Husnaa	"Heyo Goiy"		Ibrahim Nifar
2005	Asmaau Allah Al-Husnaa	"Maaiyvi Mas"		Ibrahim Nifar
2005	Asmaau Allah Al-Husnaa	"Hidhaayathu"		Ibrahim Nifar

== Controversy ==
On 16 February 2020, Maldives Police Service issued a search hunt for him over a case lodged at Civil Court, following his failure to attend a hearing on a case of proven debt.

== Accolades ==
Year	Award	Category	Nominated work	Result	Ref(s)
2002	National Award of Recognition	Performing Arts - Singing		Won	
2010	1st SunFM Awards	Best Male Entertainer		Won	
2011	2nd SunFM Awards	Most Entertaining Male Vocalist		Nominated	
