= Aan... Aharenves Loabivin =

- Official film poster
- Directed by: Abdul Faththaah
- Written by: Abdul Faththaah
- Screenplay by: Abdul Faththaah
- Produced by: Ahmed Wafau
- Starring: Ali Seezan; Sheela Najeeb; Niuma Mohamed; Aminath Rasheedha
- Cinematography: Shameel
- Edited by: Abdul Faththaah
- Music by: Imad Ismail
- Production company: Odiomart Productions
- Release date: October 10, 2002
- Running time: 154 minutes
- Country: Maldives
- Language: Dhivehi

Aan... Aharenves Loabivin is a 2002 Maldivian romantic drama film written and directed by Abdul Faththaah. Produced by Ahmed Wafau under Odiomart Productions, the film stars Ali Seezan, Sheela Najeeb, Niuma Mohamed and Aminath Rasheedha in pivotal roles.

== Premise ==
Sara, an obedient and the only child in the family started working at an office and joined a computer training class where she meets Uzair (Zabeer) who reveals that he had been previously married to a woman, Aminath (Sheereen Abdul Wahid), who died in labor. Sara goes to an office trip with her colleague Fazee (Neena Saleem) and a photographer, Jina (Ali Seezan) who clicked her photos without her consent. They later bonds at the trip and became friends while Jina started growing feelings towards Sara much to Suzy's (Niuma Mohamed) disappointment who is secretly in love with Jina.

== Cast ==
- Ali Seezan as Jina
- Sheela Najeeb as Sara
- Niuma Mohamed as Suzy
- Aminath Rasheedha as Sara's mother
- Neena Saleem as Fazee
- Haajara Abdul Kareem as Suzy's mother
- Zabeer as Uzair
- Sheereen Abdul Wahid as Aminath
- Ahmed Saeed as Ammadey
- Satthar Ibrahim Manik as Manik

== Soundtrack ==
Track listing
| No. | Title | Lyrics | Music | Singer(s) | Length |
|---|---|---|---|---|---|
| 1. | "Aadhey Mirey" | Jaufar Abdul Rahman | Mohamed Ikram | Abdul Baaree | 3:14 |
| 2. | "Liyefaa Vamey Hithugaa Thinan" | Mausoom Shakir | Haady | Mohamed Huzam, Fathimath Rauf | 5:32 |
| 3. | "Faiyythah Vayaa Thelheythee" | Mausoom Shakir | Haady | Mohamed Huzam, Fazeela Amir | 6:36 |
| 4. | "Hiyy Edhey Varunne Nuhure" | Kopee Mohamed Rasheedh | Muaviyath Anwar | Umar Zahir, Fazeela Amir | 4:11 |
| 5. | "Baakee Vumun Hiyy" | Mausoom Shakir | Haady | Mukhthar Adam, Fathimath Rauf | 4:07 |
| 6. | "Huvafen Dhekeynee" | Easa Shareef | Mohamed Ikram | Ali Rameez, Fazeela Amir | 5:31 |
| 7. | "Reethi Handhuvaree Reyreygaa" | Adam Haleem Adnan | Shinan | Mukhthar Adam, Fazeela Amir | 4:39 |
| 8. | "Maruvedhaane Maadhamaa Gaimey" | Mausoom Shakir | Haady | Ali Rameez | 4:58 |
