= Abdul Faththaah =

Maldivian filmmaker (born 1971)

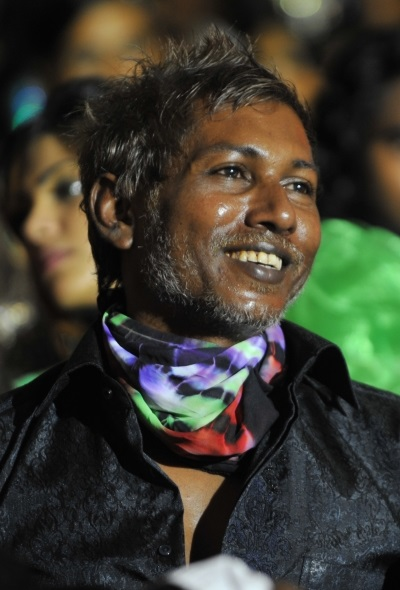
- Faththaah at 1st Maldives Film Awards ceremony, 2011
- Born: 6 December 1971 (age 54); Ha. Kelaa, Maldives
- Died: 30 December 2025 (aged 54)
- Occupations: director, producer, editor, screenwriter, choreographer
- Years active: 1996–2017

Abdul Faththaah Abdul Gayyoom (born 6 December 1971), commonly known as Abdul Faththaah was a Maldivian film director, producer, editor, screenwriter and choreographer. One of the most successful filmmakers in Maldivian Cinema, Faththaah is the recipient of a number of awards, including four Gaumee Film Awards, and two Maldives Film Awards. In 2004, Government of Maldives honoured him with the National Award of Recognition. He is known for his romantically stylish film-making.

Realizing his potential, after a successful venture at an inter-office teledrama competition, Faththaah made his directorial debut with a video single, "Dhan Dhan Dhanvaru". In 2000, he directed his first film Himeyn Dhuniye followed by Ranmuiy which was half-directed before he was roped into the project. He rose to prominence in Maldivian cinema with the commercially successful and acclaimed romantic drama Aan... Aharenves Loabivin (2002), and the horror film Eynaa (2004) — for which he received the Best Editing award at the Miadhu Crystal Awards. He followed it by directing a commercially unsuccessful film Hureemey Inthizaarugaa (2005) and the award-winning film Vehey Vaarey Therein (2003) which earned him his only Gaumee Film Award for Best Director. After establishing his own production studio, Red Productions, Faththaah directed a television drama series, Hinithun Velaashey Kalaa and a romantic drama Vaaloabi Engeynama (2006).

His most successful film was released in 2010, the romantic horror film Jinni (2010) for which he received a Maldives Film Awards Best Director nomination, followed by another romantic horror film 14 Vileyrey (2011). He received his second Gaumee Film Award nomination for Best Director with his romantic film Love Story (2012). His next release, the family drama Aadheys (2014) received mixed reviews from critics while he announced his retirement with his commercially successful film Hahdhu (2017)

== Early life ==
Abdul Faththaah was born on 6 December 1971 in Ha. Kelaa. His father used to play the harmonium. During his stay at Kelaa School, Faththaah participated in a stage narration of Maldivian classical romance novel, Dhon Hiyala and Ali Fulhu. At the age of nine, he relocated to Male' with his family. When he was studying at ninth grade, Mariyam Shauqee, a producer from Television Maldives offered him work in the inter-office teledrama competition. Apart from writing the story, Faththaah played the role of a father in the drama. Afterwards, he worked in several other teledramas; one of them featured actor Mohamed Manik alongside him. After completing tenth standard, Faththaah worked in a resort. Showing a lack of interest in the tourism industry, he moved back to Male'.

After his father's dismissal, Faththaah started working at the first Maldivian fast-food restaurant where he witnessed the "lavishing life" film actors use to be living. "It was an era where film actors were highly recognised with their stylish and luxurious life. Dining at restaurants, travelling by cars, it was that moment I realized that I want to imitate their lifestyle". Subsequently, he resigned from the restaurant and joined Maldives National Defence Force where he was in their service for six years. In 1995, Faththaah wrote and directed Maldives National Defence Force's teledrama Veyn where he was bestowed with the Best Director award and he went on to win the award for a further two years. Realizing his successful venture in film-making, Faththaah resigned from MNDF and joined the Maldives film industry. He first directed a video single, "Dhan Dhan Dhanvaru" featuring Ravee Farooq and Niuma Mohamed. This was followed by "Aaberu Toh Toh" and several other songs.

== Career ==
In 2000, Faththaah released his directorial debut, Himeyn Dhuniye which starred Mariyam Nisha and Ali Khalid as a couple having an extra-marital affair. This was followed by Ranmuiy which was "half-directed" before he was roped into the project. Directed alongside Abdulla Sujau, the film centers on the dispute between a daughter and her step-mother.

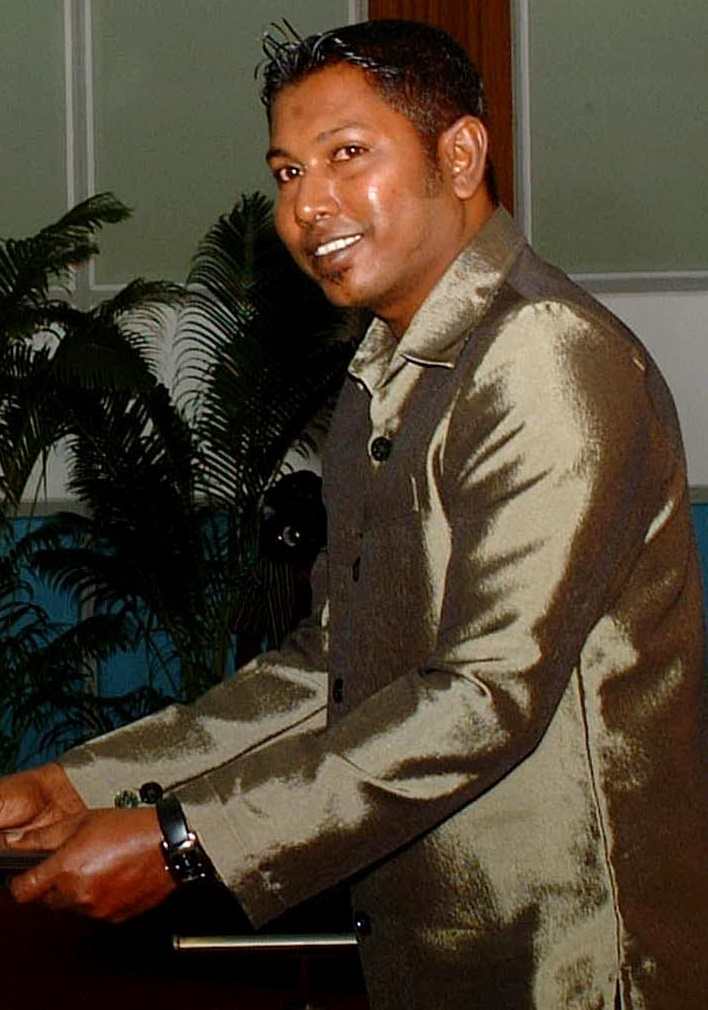
Faththaah receiving the National Award of Recognition, 2004

In 2002, Faththaah directed a romantic film Aan... Aharenves Loabivin which starred Ali Seezan, Sheela Najeeb, Niuma Mohamed, Aminath Rasheedha and Neena Saleem which follows an only child of a family who had a bitter relationship with her lovers and an unfortunate incident leading her to suffer from amnesia. Upon release, the film opened to a positive response from critics and was a commercially successful project. His next directorial venture was the horror film Eynaa (2004), in which appeared Sheela Najeeb, Mohamed Manik, Ahmed Shah, Khadheeja Ibrahim Didi, Ibrahim Jihad and Nashidha Mohamed as six colleagues who go on a picnic to a haunted uninhabited island and their battle for survival. The film garnered critical appreciation especially for its technical department and was a commercial success. The film fetched him the Best Editor award at Miadhu Crystal Award ceremony.

The following year, Faththaah released two films. His first film, a romantic disaster film, Hureemey Inthizaarugaa (2005) featured a cast including Ravee Farooq, Mariyam Zuhura, Waleedha Waleed, Ibrahim Jihad and Neena Saleem. The film, heavily relied on the effect of the 2004 Indian Ocean earthquake on the Maldives, narrates the journey a couple separated due to husband's greed for wealth and their reconciliation following a traumatic event which destroyed their family. The film received favorable reviews from critics though it failed to perform financially. Faththaah considered the film to be his "only agreement that leads to a disappointment". His next release during the year, the critically praised romantic film Vehey Vaarey Therein (2003) was one of the most successful films he directed in his career. Featuring Yoosuf Shafeeu, Jamsheedha Ahmed, Khadheeja Ibrahim Didi, Mohamed Shavin, Amira Ismail and Aminath Rasheedha in main roles, the film narrates the story of unrequited love, and proved to be one of the highest-grossing Maldivian films of the year. At the 4th Gaumee Film Awards ceremony, Faththaah was bestowed with several awards including a Gaumee Film Award for Best Director, Best Screenplay, Best Art Direction and Best Makeup. In 2006, he established his own production company, Red Productions. Under the helm of the studio, Faththaah directed a 52-episode television drama series Hinithun Velaashey Kalaa starring Mariyam Afeefa, Khadheeja Ibrahim Didi and Mohamed Manik. Next, he produced the romantic film Vaaloabi Engeynama (2006) which was directed by Ahmed Nimal and was a critical and commercial success, considered to be the most successful Maldivian release of the year. The film follows a conflicted husband struggling to convey equal affection towards his two spouses.

In 2010, Fatathaah released another horror film Jinni starring Ali Seezan and Mariyam Afeefa in lead roles. Based on true incidents that occurred in an island of Maldives, the film focuses on Javid who has been enthralled by a ghost. Prior to release, the film was marketed to be full of "suspense and uniqueness" compared to other Maldivian horror films. Upon release, the film received mixed reviews from critics; the majority of them complaining for having the "same old feeling" of prior horror films though the performances were noted to be satisfactory. Despite the mixed reviews, the film witnessed a positive response at the box office, declaring it as a Mega-Hit; financially the most successful film of Faththaah's. At the 1st Maldives Film Awards, Fatathaah received a nomination as Best Director and Editor while winning Best Choreographer award for the song "Thundimatheega".

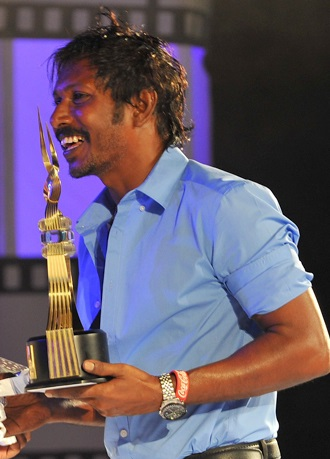
Faththaah at 2nd Maldives Film Awards ceremony, 2012

A series of horror films were continued with his next release, 14 Vileyrey (2011) featuring Ali Seezan, Aishath Rishmy and Mariyam Nisha. Written by Ibrahim Waheed, the project faced controversy when the team of Kuhveriakee Kaakuhey? accused Faththaah for "purloining the plot" of the latter. The film and his work received mixed to positive reviews from critics; "Faththaah has directed the film in a lavishly engaging manner until it reaches to a little inconvenient climax". The film did good business at the box office and was declared a "Hit". His collaboration with Ali Seezan and Aishath Rishmy was repeated in his next release, a romantic film Love Story (2012). The film and his direction received a negative response from critics. Displeased with the screenplay and performance of the actors, Ahmed Nadheem of Haveeru wrote: "None of the actors were given scope to build their characters and none was able to justify their character. Barring a charming poster and title, nothing works in the film; biggest letdown by Fathtaah in his career". Despite the negative reviews, Faththaah received several nominations including Gaumee Film Award nomination for Best Editing, Best Art Direction and three separate nominations for Best Choreography while winning in the same category at 3rd Maldives Film Awards.

It was followed by a family drama film, Aadheys (2014) starring Niuma Mohamed, Hussain Sobah, Amira Ismail, Moosa Zakariyya, Fathimath Azifa and Ali Azim. Filming was completed in 2011, though it was released three years following the death of film producer Hassain Ali. It revolves around a sacrificing mother and her affection towards her child. Upon release, the film received mixed reviews from critics and failed to leave an impression commercially. Ismail Naail reviewing from Vaguthu wrote: "The film focuses on family issues, identity issues and includes romantic components and several other aspects making it a mixed bag of emotions. It has several issues in the technical department though its melodrama might leave an impact on audience".

Faththaah announced his retirement after releasing his romantic drama Hahdhu (2017) which was his most expensive film produced. The film touched upon controversial issues in the Maldives including the depiction of flogging and also shines a light on mental health by featuring an attempted suicide. A reviewer from Avas wrote: "The film may not be a first class movie but it has integrated a benchmark in video quality. Camerawork, videography and direction deserves special mention". The film opened to mixed reviews from critics though it emerged as one of the highest grossing Maldivian films of the year.

In 2019, first Maldivian anthology film was released which credited Faththaah as the director of the segment titled Dharifiri which focuses on mother-son incest. The project was filmed in 2013 and digitally released six years later due to several delays in post-production, where the producer of the film criticizes Farooq for "failing" to complete his segment during the stipulated time period took over the post-production.

== Personal life ==
Faththaah is married to Aminath Azza, a teacher working at Aminiya School. On 23 December 2004, Azza gave birth to a son, Ali Ayyoob Abdul Fathah.

== Filmography ==
=== Feature film ===
Year	Title	Director	Producer	Screenplay	Editor	Ref(s)
2000	Himeyn Dhuniye	Yes		Yes		
2001	Ranmuiy	Yes			Yes	
2002	Aan... Aharenves Loabivin	Yes		Yes	Yes	
2003	Vehey Vaarey Therein	Yes	Yes	Yes	Yes	
2004	Eynaa	Yes		Yes	Yes	
2005	Hureemey Inthizaarugaa	Yes			Yes	
2006	Vaaloabi Engeynama		Yes			
2009	Udhabaani				Yes	
2010	Jinni	Yes			Yes	
2011	14 Vileyrey	Yes			Yes	
2012	Love Story	Yes			Yes	
2014	Aadheys	Yes				
2017	Hahdhu	Yes	Yes			

=== Television and short films ===
Year	Title	Director	Producer	Screenplay	Editor	Notes	Ref(s)
1996	Veyn	Yes		Yes		Teledrama	
1997	Lhafuraa	Yes		Yes		Teledrama	
1998–1999	Aisha	Yes		Yes		52 episodes	
1999–2000	Maafkuraashey			Yes		10 episodes	
2000	Dhoapatta	Yes		Yes		12 episodes	
2002	Fahu Fiyavalhu	Yes				5 episodes	
2003–2004	Thiyey Mihithuge Vindhakee	Yes		Yes		52 episodes	
2006	Kuramey Vadhaaee Salaam	Yes	Yes		Yes	13 episodes	
2006–2008	Hinithun Velaashey Kalaa	Yes	Yes		Yes	52 episodes	
2009	Pink Fairy				Yes	Short film	
2010	Dhekafi				Yes	Short film	
2010	Nu Ufan Dhari			Yes	Yes	Short film	
2012	Kaiveni	Yes	Yes			5 episodes	
2013	Vaudhey Mee	Yes		Yes	Yes	Television series	
2019	Hatharu Halha	Yes				The segment Dhari/Firi	

== Accolades ==
Year	Award	Category	Nominated work	Result	Ref(s)
2004	National Award of Recognition	Performing Arts - Film direction		Won	
2007	1st Miadhu Crystal Award	Best Editing	Eynaa (Shared with Ahmed Shah)	Won	
2007	1st Miadhu Crystal Award	Best Director	Vehey Vaarey Therein	Nominated	
2007	1st Miadhu Crystal Award	Best Director (Jury)	Hureemey Inthizaarugaa	Won	
2007	4th Gaumee Film Awards	Best Director	Vehey Vaarey Therein	Won	
2007	4th Gaumee Film Awards	Best Screenplay	Vehey Vaarey Therein	Won	
2007	4th Gaumee Film Awards	Best Art Direction	Vehey Vaarey Therein	Won	
2007	4th Gaumee Film Awards	Best Makeup	Vehey Vaarey Therein	Won	
2010	Maldives Video Music Awards	Best Video Song	"Vaaloabi Engeynama" from Vaaloabi Engeynama	Won	
2012	2nd Maldives Film Awards	Best Director	Jinni	Nominated	
2012	2nd Maldives Film Awards	Best Editing	Jinni	Nominated	
2012	2nd Maldives Film Awards	Best Choreography	Jinni	Won	
2014	3rd Maldives Film Awards	Best Choreography	Love Story	Won	
2015	7th Gaumee Film Awards	Best Director	Love Story	Nominated	
2015	7th Gaumee Film Awards	Best Editing	Love Story (Shared with Mohamed Aksham)	Nominated	
2015	7th Gaumee Film Awards	Best Art Direction	Love Story	Nominated	
2015	7th Gaumee Film Awards	Best Choreography	Love Story	Nominated	
2015	7th Gaumee Film Awards	Best Choreography	Love Story	Nominated	
2015	7th Gaumee Film Awards	Best Choreography	Love Story (Shared with Aishath Rishmy)	Nominated	
2019	9th Gaumee Film Awards	Best Director	Hahdhu	Nominated	
2019	9th Gaumee Film Awards	Best Art Direction	Hahdhu	Nominated	
