= Fukkashi =

Maldivian comedy television series

- Opening sequence
- Genre: Comedy
- Written by: Kopee Mohamed Rasheed
- Screenplay by: Kopee Mohamed Rasheed
- Directed by: Hussain Rasheed
- Country of origin: Maldives
- Original language: Divehi
- No. of seasons: 1
- No. of episodes: 25

Original release
- Release: 2005 – 2006

Fukkashi is Maldivian anthology television series written by Kopee Mohamed Rasheed and directed by Hussain Rasheed. The series consists of twenty-five episodes, spanning through different genres, mainly serious comedy, and presents different story and different set of characters in each episode.

Hussain Shibau was cast in a total of nineteen episodes followed by Mohamed Anil (16 episodes), Aminath Shareef (15 episodes), Fathimath Niuma (14 episodes) and Chilhiya Moosa Manik (13 episodes). Except for the character Hassan, portrayed by Hussain Shibau in the episodes "Tharutheebu" and "Dhari Kulunu", all the characters are distinct and has no connection or reference to a preceding episode, even though same actors recur in multiple episodes. The first fifteen episodes were released in 2005 while the rest ten episodes were released in 2006.

== Episodes ==
No. in season	Title	Directed by	Camera by	Edited by
1	"Futboalha Foari"	Hussain Rasheed	Iyad Ali, Mohamed Abdul Ghafoor	Ahmed Zufar, Ahmed Imad
Dhon Manik, a die-hard football fan is married to Afiya and they are blessed with three children, Baaree, Janah who are equally big football fans and a daughter, Nareema, who is engaged to Mushthaq, popular football player. Mushthaq, while preparing to leave abroad, is insecure about losing Nareema over a wealthy guy. Meanwhile, Dhon Manik gets mingled in a fist fight among supporters, but does not stop him from rejoicing at his team's win. Cast : Kopee Mohamed Rasheed as Dhon Manik, Aminath Rasheedha as Afiya, Ismail Rasheed as Mushthaq, Sheereen Abdul Wahid as Nareema, Ali Abdulla as delivery boy, Hussain Shibau as Janah, Hussain Nooradeen as Raatte, Ahmed Saeed as Baaree, Ibrahim Rasheed as a customer
2	"Buhdhi Boa"	Hussain Rasheed	Ali Shafau	Ahmed Zufar
Ibrahim Manik, an underprivileged man, married to Saamath, applies for a housing scheme. The manager in-charge of the process assured that Ibrahim is a promising candidate. Soon after he is confirmed a plot in Male'. What follows is a sequence of comical events where Ibrahim goes to the city council to register a name for his house. Cast : Hassan Afeef as Ibrahim Manik, Sheereen Abdul Wahid as Saamath, Chilhiya Moosa Manik as a manager, Hussain Nooradeen as an officer, Hussain Shibau as a servant
3	"Maithiri"	Hussain Rasheed	Ali Shafau	Aswad Najeeb
Saleem is an old-aged man married to two wives, Saara and Saadhuna, who despises each other. Though Saleem treats them fairly and equally, he fails to make peace between them. What makes the impossible possible is Saleem faking a relationship with a much younger woman, Rifu. Cast : Roanu Hassan Manik as Saleem, Aminath Shareef as Saara, Saadhuna as Shakeeba, Abdulla Naseer as Shareef, Naufal as Shashi, Hussain Shibau as Saleem's youngest child, Aminath Nashfa as Rifu, Hussain Nooradeen as a staff
4	"Beyzaaru"	Hussain Rasheed	Ali Shafau	Ahmed Zufar
Three judges open a love test to evaluate the affection and romance each couple has for one another. The first couple, Baila and Laila passes the feelings test and their physical test is held back for a year, while the second couple, Jana and Hana fails the test as the girl could not lift the boy. Similarly, the third couple faces rejection as the boy is a foreigner while the fourth couple faces a similar fate, only to find out that the whole program is a scam. Cast : Chilhiya Moosa Manik as a judge, Ajuwad Waheed as a judge, Hussain Nooradeen as a judge, Hussain Shibau as Baila, Mariyam Afeefa as Laila, Ismail Rasheed as Jana, Aminath Nashfa as Hana, Mohamed Anil as Chunki, Saadhuna as Nadhiya, Ahmed Rasheed as a robot, Aminath Shareef as Sweety, Siyaaru as secretary
5	"Suvaalu Foshi"	Hussain Rasheed	Mohamed Abdul Ghafoor, Mohamed Shiyaz, Ahmed Azim, Ali Shafau	Aswad Najeeb, Ahmed Zufar, Ahmed Imad
Razzaq, as inquisitive person keeps irritating anyone who passes by with his curiosity and multiple questions. Cast : Chilhiya Moosa Manik as Razzaq, Hussain Shibau as Dhonthu, Ajuwad Waheed, Ahmed Rasheed, Naeem, Shiyaru, Mohamed Anil as a thief, Naufal, Abdullah Naseer as Dhon Manik, Mariyam Afeefa as an actress, Ismail Rasheed as an actor
6	"Vagu Bulhaa"	Hussain Rasheed	Abdulla Shameel	Aswad Najeeb, Ahmed Zufar
Wadheefa, a lustful middle aged woman has an extramarital affair with a young man, Firaq, unbeknownst to her husband, Jaufar. Cast : Aminath Shareef as Wadheefa, Hussain Shibau as Firaq, Chilhiya Moosa Manik as Jaufar, Mohamed Anil, Aminath Nashfa as Rifa
7	"Lolu Dhaabba"	Hussain Rasheed	Ali Shafau	Hassan Nishath, Ahmed Mohamed
Ali Manik, a womanizer, working at a factory falls in love with a young stranger and starts dreaming about her. Despite being advised by his close friends and wife, he is not willing to let go off his attitude. Cast : Hussain Nooradeen as Ali Manik, Aminath Shareef as Mariyam, Adam Shiyar, Mariyam Afeefa as Shahu, Hussain Shibau as Qadir, Abdulla Naseer as Moosa, Mohamed Anil, Mohamed Amir as Easafulhu
8	"Tharutheebu"	Hussain Rasheed	Ali Shafau	Ahmed Zufar
Riyaz, after attaining PhD in Arrangement comes back to Maldives and teaches his family to organize everything in an orderly manner, which irritates everyone around him. Cast : Ismail Rasheed as Riyaz, Sheereen Abdul Wahid as Amira, Roanu Hassan Manik, Hussain Shibau as Hassan, Abdulla Junaid as Bushree, Mariyam Shahuza and Fathimath Niuma as Amira's friends, Mohamed Anil as a beggar, Ali Iufaf Mohamed as Shan
9	"Fihigan'du Bumaru"	Hussain Rasheed	Ali Shafau	Ahmed Mohamed, Ayyoob Ali
Nadheem, an irresponsible father and a struggling lectiophile aspires to becomes an anchor and commentator, much to the disappointment of his wife, Jaariya who lashes out to him for his lack of responsibility. Cast : Hussain Nooradeen as Nadheem, Aminath Shareef as Jaariya, Shiyau as Shah, Abdullah Naseer, Ahmed Shiyam, Mohamed Anil, Abdulla Junaid, Shifaza, Nishana, Chilhiya Moosa Manik, Fathimath Niuma, Ihusan
10	"Fenu Falho"	Hussain Rasheed	Ali Shafau	Ayyoob Ali
Shareef, an arrogant and prideful man takes some of his girlfriends and family friends to a reputable restaurant, hoping to deceive the restaurant owner again, but rather getting himself exposed. Cast : Ahmed Saeed as Shareef, Mariyam Afeefa as Shaany, Mariyam Shahuza as Fazy, Fathimath Niuma as Rifa, Ibrahim Shakir as Yahuya, Aminath Shareef as Latheefa, Aishath Rasheedha as Aishath, Salma as Faathun, Mohamed Anil as Anil
11	"Namoona"	Hussain Rasheed	Ahmed Mohamed	Ayyoob Ali
Nasira and Basheer are an unhappy couple who cannot evade their feelings for their respective ex-spouse. After their divorce, the couple were forced to reunite as they are financially non-stable to live individually. The problem persists until they seek help from a counseller and mediator. Cast : Hussain Nooradeen as Hassan Basheer, Aminath Shareef as Nasira Qasim, Hussain Shibau as Umar, Chilhiya Moosa Manik as Naibu, Jaudha Ali as Suraiyya, Roanu Hassan Manik as magistrate
12	"Dhebah Raalhu"	Hussain Rasheed	Ali Shafau	Ahmed Imad, Mohamed Shukoor
Qadir, a former actor continues an extramarital affair with a young lady, Shabnam, who is not aware of his marital status. He continues the charade until he was caught red-handed by his wife and mistress. Cast : Ismail Rasheed as Qadir, Mariyam Shahuza as Naziya, Chilhiya Moosa Manik as Qadir's manager, Fathimath Niuma as Shabnam, Aminath Shareef as Shabnam's mother, Mohamed Anil, Fathimath Nashfa as Naziya's friend
13	"Dhari Kulunu"	Hussain Rasheed	Ali Shafau, Mohamed Abdul Ghafoor	Hassan Nishath
Hassan, an effeminate man, madly in love with an over-protected girl Nareema, starts working at her place as a servant, hoping to validate his relationship with Nareema. Cast : Hussain Shibau as Hassan, Khadheeja Ibrahim Didi as Nareema, Fathimath Nashfa as Shifa, Chilhiya Moosa Manik, Aminath Shareef, Ahmed Saeed as Shareef
14	"Filaavalhu"	Hussain Rasheed	Ali Shafau, Mohamed Abdul Ghafoor	Hassan Nishath
A talent hunter, Mustho, invites a thug leader, Roky for an audition while the latter is hell-bent on proving his love for a young woman who marries a wealthy man as demanded by her parents. Cast : Shaheez Abdullah as Bulbul, Zareer as Sancho, Mahir, Fathimath Niuma as Sunee, Hussain Shibau as Roky, Chilhiya Moosa Manik, Aminath Shareef, Ahmed Saeed as Mustho, Mohamed Anil as Idhurees
15	"Kahchaabali"	Hussain Rasheed	Ali Shafau	Ahmed Zufar
Mohodhey, a person who changes his occupation every second month, is madly in love with a married woman, Zeenath. Ungrateful, he quits every job, hoping for better opportunities, until he becomes completely jobless. Cast : Ahmed Saeed as Mohodhey, Abdulla Jiyadh as Hassan, Ibrahim Thasneem as Hussain, Fathimath Niuma as Zeenath, Salma, Naeem
16	"Gellunu Muthee"	Hussain Rasheed	Ali Shafau, Abdulla Sameel, Mohamed Siyaz	Ahmed Zufar
Jamaal hires a private tutor, Shiyam for his wife, Fazna, unbeknownst to him of the danger he is inviting into his married life. Cast : Hussain Shibau as Shiyam, Ahmed Saeed as Jamaal, Fathimath Niuma as Fazna, Abdulla Jiyadh as Ali, Mohamed Anil as Tholal
17	"Maru Fali"	Hussain Rasheed	Adam Rasheed, Mohamed Abdul Ghafoor	Ahmed Zufar, Ayyoob Ali
In order to attain the love and approval from a young woman, Yucie, three best friends, Afrah, Sobah and Rauf determine to excel in their respective field, singing, footballing and news editing, respectively. Cast : Hussain Shibau as Afrah, Abdulla Jiyadh as Sobah, Mohamed Anil as Rauf, Fathimath Niuma as Yucie/Juhi, Chilhiya Moosa Manik as Saud, Aminath Shareef as Shareefa
18	"Rocky"	Hussain Rasheed	Adam Rasheed	Ahmed Zufar
Roky, an obsessive lover of Sunee, who is happily married to Idhurees, makes threatening calls hoping to be loved back by her. Roky takes his jealousy too far even attempting to kill Idhurees. Cast : Hussain Shibau as Rocky, Fathimath Niuma as Sunee, Mohamed Anil as Idhurees, Salma, Chilhiya Moosa Manik
19	"Kathuru Fani"	Hussain Rasheed	Ahmed Shiyaz, Mohamed Abdul Ghafoor, Ahmed Mohamed	Ayyoob Ali
Hudha, an obsessive admirer of a married man, Akram is willing to take excessive measures to win the love of him. Cast : Khadheeja Ibrahim Didi as Hudha, Shaheez Abdulla as Akram, Mohamed Anil as Mushthaaq, Fathimath Niuma as Shakeela, Ahmed Rasheed
20	"Nu-athu Roalhi"	Hussain Rasheed	Ahmed Shiyaz	Ayyoob Ali
Saappe, an unfortunate man consults a palmist Hassanbe, unaware of the impact it would have on his life. Cast : Hussain Shibau as Saappe, Khadheeja Ibrahim Didi as Nazima, Ali Ihusan, Chilhiya Moosa Manik as Hassanbe, Aminath Shareef as Sanpa, Ali Mahir, Mohamed Anil, Musthafa Rasheed, Abdulla Naseer
21	"Nunegunu Photo"	Hussain Rasheed	Hussain Imthiyaz, Adam Rasheed	Ayyoob Ali
Ammadey seeks help from his friend Jade to capture a photograph of his love interest, Fareena which keeps failing due to her overprotective mother. Cast : Hussain Shibau as Jade, Mohamed Anil as Ammadey, Fathimath Niuma as Fareena, Aminath Shareef as Fareena's mother, Abdulla Naseer as Mubaadh, Ahmed Rasheed
22	"Maalhaha"	Hussain Rasheed	Adam Rasheed	Ayyoob Ali
Sarippe, who is already married to an exasperated second wife, Saleema, continues an extramarital affair with his divorced first wife, Julia on the promise to leave Saleema for her. Things get complicated when Sarippe fails to treat them equal and hesitate to leave one for another. Cast : Ahmed Saeed as Sarippe, Khadheeja Ibrahim Didi as Saleema, Abdulla Naseer as Dhona, Fathimath Niuma as Julia
23	"Kandifaaru Beys"	Hussain Rasheed	Adam Rasheed	Ayyoob Ali
Rabia, a short tempered wife, is heartbroken when she learns that her old-aged husband, Shiham marries another woman, which tests her patience. Cast : Hussain Shibau as Harey, Mohamed Anil as Madey, Chilhiya Moosa Manik as Shiham, Aminath Shareef as Rabia, Ahmed Rasheed as Guruji, Badhoora as Haseena
24	"Umurah Salaam"	Hussain Rasheed	Adam Rasheed	Ayyoob Ali
Shibau and Majeedh coerced their fellow friend, Sharippe to contest in the upcoming MP election. As the campaign process kickstarts, Sarippe starts making public appearances and starts spending unconditionally, which ultimately leads to a big failure. Cast : Ahmed Saeed as Sharippe, Khadheeja Ibrahim Didi as Fira, Hussain Shibau as Firaq, Abdulla Naseer as Majeedh
25	"Joorimanaa"	Hussain Rasheed	Adam Rasheed	Ayyoob Ali
Cast : Ahmed Rasheed as Jauharee, Aminath Shareef as Zareena, Hussain Shibau as Fathuhee, Badhoora as Dhon Kanbulo, Abdulla Naseer as Dawood, Fathimath Niuma as Secretary, Ali Rasheed, Rashadh

== Soundtrack ==
Track listing
No.	Title	Lyrics	Singer(s)	Length
1.	"Mulhi Dhuniye Ekee Milku Viyas"	Kopee Mohamed Rasheed	Fazeela Amir
2.	"Gedhoru Netheemaa Gedhoru Alhaigen"	Kopee Mohamed Rasheed	Ahmed Rasheed
3.	"Hoadhenee Hoadhenee"	Kopee Mohamed Rasheed	Ahmed Amir
4.	"Dhogu Hedhumee Aadhahey"	Kopee Mohamed Rasheed	Fazeela Amir
5.	"Alhekeehey Vaanee"	Kopee Mohamed Rasheed	Mohamed Shahubaan
6.	"Moona Moonu Kairi Veema"	Kopee Mohamed Rasheed	Ibrahim Amir, Fazeela Amir
7.	"Ishqee Aawaaraakan"	Adam Haleem Adnan	Hassan Ilham

== Reception ==
Upon release, the series received mainly positive reviews from audience and critics, where its humor and comic elements were particularly praised.
