= Zalzalaa =

- Official film poster
- Directed by: Ahmed Nimal
- Written by: Ahmed Nimal
- Screenplay by: Ahmed Nimal
- Produced by: Aslam Rasheed
- Starring: Ibrahim Wisan; Niuma Mohamed; Ali Shameel
- Cinematography: Abdulla Jameel; Ibrahim Wisan
- Edited by: Ahmed Nimal
- Music by: Imad Ismail; Ahmed Amir
- Production company: Slam Studio
- Release date: August 14, 2000
- Country: Maldives
- Language: Dhivehi

Zalzalaa is a 2000 Maldivian horror classic film written and directed by Ahmed Nimal. Produced by Aslam Rasheed under Slam Studio, the film stars Ibrahim Wisan, Niuma Mohamed and Ali Shameel in pivotal roles.

== Premise ==
Ahmed Zameel (Ibrahim Wisan) working at an office in Male' visits an island to hand over his friend Moosa's assets and cash to his family after his shocking death. There he meets a happy-go-girl Shiuna Ibrahim (Niuma Mohamed) and a relationship grows between them. Zameel reveals that he was previously married to an indolent and irresponsible lady, Nashfa (Neena Saleem) and they had a son before he divorced her. Shiuna promises to love his son as her own and they marry. Things are going smoothly and happily until Ibrahim (Ali Shameel) arrives home and possess divergent attitude and behavior which is initially thought to be a mental disease, later revealed to be that he has been possessed by a spirit.

== Cast ==
- Ibrahim Wisan as Ahmed Zameel
- Niuma Mohamed as Shiuna Ibrahim
- Ali Shameel as Ibrahim
- Aishath Shiranee
- Neena Saleem as Nashfa
- Mifzal Amir as Shammi
- Nooma Ibrahim as Mariyam
- Mohamed Afrah as Shahid
- Chilhiya Moosa Manik as Mudhimbe
- Abdul Raheem as Nashfa's husband
- Ahmed Nimal as Adam
- Ahmed Shah as Zameel's friend
- Maryam Shafaza Shameem as Zameel's sister

== Soundtrack ==
Track listing
No.	Title	Lyrics	Singer(s)	Length
1.	"Hunnanveehey Mikhiyaalugaa"	Aishath Ali Manik	Abdul Hannan Moosa Didi
2.	"Vejjey Ma Hairaan"	Abdul Hannan Moosa Didi	Ali Rameez, Fazeela Amir
3.	"Miee Zalzalaa Thaa"	Abdul Hannan Moosa Didi	Abdul Hannan Moosa Didi
4.	"Aadhey Aadhey"	Abdul Hannan Moosa Didi	Rafiyath Rameeza
