= Ranmuiy =

- Directed by: Abdulla Sujau; Abdul Faththaah
- Written by: Abdul Muhaimin
- Screenplay by: Abdul Muhaimin
- Produced by: Abdul Muhaimin
- Starring: Ismail Wajeeh; Aishath Ibrahim; Amira Amir; Adnan Abdul Raheem; Ahmed Naseer; Aminath Rasheedha
- Cinematography: Mohamed Manik; Abdulla Sujau; Abdulla Shameel; Mohamed Abdulla; Ahmed Athoof; Ibrahim Moosa; Mohamed Afrasheem; Hassan Haleem; Hussain Imthiyaz; Mohamed Niyaz
- Edited by: Mohamed Amsad; Mohamed Jinah; Abdul Faththaah
- Music by: Maars Studio; Ahmed Amir; Ahmed Affal; Ibrahim Nazim
- Release date: 2001
- Country: Maldives
- Language: Dhivehi

Ranmuiy (transl. Golden Pearl) is a 2001 Maldivian drama film directed by Abdulla Sujau and Abdul Faththaah. Produced by Abdul Muhaimin, the film stars Ismail Wajeeh and Aishath Ibrahim in pivotal roles. The film was heavily marketed for its item song titled "Bahdhaluvumun Vejje Dheewana" featuring Indian actress Rajeshwari which was initially planned with Bollywood actress Juhi Chawla but had to cut short after she sprained her ankle while trying to board a speedboat.

== Premise ==
The film is centered on the dispute between a daughter and her step-mother. Waheed (Ismail Wajeeh) a simple widower goes to an island and is instantly attracted to Shakeela (Aishath Ibrahim) a middle-class ill-mannered young woman. They marry and Shakeela is brought to Waheed's house. Complications arise when Shakeela personally attacks her step-daughter, Reesha (Amira Amir) while interfering with her personal life.

== Cast ==
- Ismail Wajeeh as Waheed
- Aishath Ibrahim as Shakeela
- Amira Amir as Reesha
- Adnan Abdul Raheem as Azheem
- Ahmed Naseer as Adil
- Aminath Rasheedha as Kuda Kamana
- Ismail Zahir as Zahir
- Ibrahim Rasheed as Ibrahim
- Mariyam Shakeela as Azza
- Ibrahim Afeef as Rasheed
- Hamid Wajeeh as Idrees
- Mariyam Haleem as Azheem's mother
- Sara as Safiyya
- Rajeshwari (Special appearance in the song "Bahdhaluvumun Vejje Dheewana")

== Soundtrack ==
Track listing
No.	Title	Lyrics	Music	Singer(s)	Length
1.	"Hiyaalugaa Hunnan"	Abdul Muhaimin	Monus	Umar Zahir
2.	"Oh My God!"	Abdul Muhaimin	Monus	Ibrahim Amir, Fazeela Amir
3.	"Ey Aashiqaa"	Mohamed Rasheed	Faid Farooq	Ali Rameez, Fazeela Amir
4.	"Hello"	Abdul Muhaimin	Monus	Fazeela Amir
5.	"Bahdhaluvumun Vejje Dheewana"	Easa Shareef	Faid Farooq	Ibrahim Amir, Fazeela Amir
6.	"Andhuneh Alhuvaa"	Abdul Muhaimin	Monus	Ahmed Amir, Fazeela Amir
7.	"Hiy Vanee Efanaa"	Abdul Muhaimin	Monus	Rafiyath Rameeza
