= Aminath Shaufa Saeed =

Maldivian female singer

- Born: 9 November 1990 (age 35); Male', Maldives
- Occupation: Playback singer
- Years active: 2007–2011
- Musical career
- Genres: Pop; filmi; electronic
- Instrument: Vocals

Aminath Shaufa Saeed (9 November 1990) is a Maldivian singer.

== Career ==
In 2007, Saeed appeared in one of the Television Maldives-created singing series shows, Thihan'dhaanugai, where she performed a cover of the song "Eynee Loabi", originally performed by Masodi Hassan Khaleel. Her voice was regarded as "somber", "husky" and "closed" yet "soulful", mostly comfortable in the lower vocal range. In 2008, she was nominated as the "Voice of Maldives", a singing competition where the winner gets to show up in Voice of India. She performed in the succeeding shows of Ehan'dhaanugai series including Thihan'dhaanugai Remix (2008) and Ehan'dhaanugai Duet (2009), where she rendered a remix cover version of the song "Vindhaa Hithaa" originally performed by Sultans Band, for the former and a duet song "Balamun Midhaa" for the latter with Ahmed Amir. She next performed the slow-paced romantic song "Vindhu Hithaa" for the film E Dharifulhu (2009), alongside Mohamed Abdul Ghanee, which was nominated as the Best Duet Song in Maldives Video Music Awards 2010. This was followed by her collaboration with Hassan Ilham for the upbeat dance song "Udhabaani" from Udhabaani (2009).

In 2010, she was part of the vocal ensemble in the song "Annaashey Hinithun Velamaa" from Dhin Veynuge Hithaamaigaa (2010), the child abuse awareness song "Veeraana" from Veeraana, "Vindhaa Kulhey" from Niuma (2010) and "Vaahandhaanakun Rovenee" from Vaahan'dhaanakun 2. For the latter, released as a memoire for late legend Naifaru Dhohokko, she recorded an additional track "Giritee Loabin", all of which were well received by audience and critics. The year marks her last appearance in the Ehan'dhaanugai series, by performing the cover version of Nethuneehey Miadhu Beynun, alongside Hassan Jalaal. Also, she collaborated with Jalaal and Mira Mohamed Majid, serving as a coach for the contestants for Raajje Ran Adu in 2010. The following year, she was heard in only one song "Lafzu Thakey" from Sazaa (2011).

== Discography ==
=== Feature film ===
Year	Film	Song	Lyricist(s)	Co-artist(s)	Notes
2009	E Dharifulhu	"Vindhu Hithaa"	Mohamed Abdul Ghanee	Mohamed Abdul Ghanee	
2009	Udhabaani	"Udhabaani"		Hassan Ilham	
2010	Dhin Veynuge Hithaamaigaa	"Annaashey Hinithun Velamaa"	Mohamed Abdul Ghanee	Mohamed Abdul Ghanee, Ibrahim Zaid Ali, Ahmed Shabeen, Mariyam Ashfa, Rafiyath Rameeza	
2010	Veeraana	"Veeraana" (Promotional song)	Adam Haleem Adnan	Various artists	
2010	Niuma	"Vindhaa Kulhey"	Mohamed Abdul Ghanee	Mohamed Abdul Ghanee, Ibrahim Nashif, Ibrahim Zaid Ali, Mariyam Ashfa	
2010	Niuma	"Dheevaana Hiyy"	Mohamed Abdul Ghanee	Mohamed Abdul Ghanee	
2010	Niuma	"Edhenee Hayaatheh Fashaashey"	Adam Haleem Adnan	Mumthaz Moosa	Appears in Soundtrack
2011	Sazaa	"Lafzu Thakey"	Mohamed Abdul Ghanee	Mumthaz Moosa	

=== Short film ===
Year	Film	Song	Lyricist(s)	Co-artist(s)
2009	Dheke Dhekeves 5	"Laki Laki"	Mohamed Abdul Ghanee	Hassan Ilham

=== Non-film songs ===
Year	Album/single	Song	Lyricist(s)	Co-Artist(s)
2007	Thihan'dhaanugai	"Eynee Loabi"	Veeru Ahmed Didi	Solo
2007	Hiyy Sihenee	"Hithuga Veyey"		Mohamed Abdul Ghanee
2007	Single	"E Shaheedhunge Handhaanugai"	Jaufar Abdul Rahman	Ibrahim Shafeeu, Hussain Ali, Mohamed Suheil, Mohamed Abdul Ghanee, Hassan Ilham, Ahmed Athif, Ahmed Abulla, Shifa Thaufeeq, Aminath Shaanee, Mariyam Rifqa Rasheed
2008	Thihan'dhaanugai Remix	"Vindhaa Hithaa (Saahibaa)"	Sultans Band	Solo
2009	Ehan'dhaanugai Duet	"Balamun Midhaa"		Ahmed Amir
2010	Ehan'dhaanugai Remix	"Nethuneehey Miadhu Beynun"		Hassan Jalaal
2010	Vaahan'dhaanakun 2	"Giritee Loabin"	Beyya Huhthu	Solo
2010	Vaahan'dhaanakun 2	"Vaahan'dhaanakun Rovenee"	Mohamed Amir Ahmed	Various

== Filmography ==
Year	Title	Role	Notes	Ref(s)
2010	Veeraana	Herself	Special appearance in the promotional song "Veeraana"	
2010	Raajje Ran Adu (season 2)	Vocal coach		

== Accolades ==
Year	Award	Category	Recipients	Result	Ref(s)
2008	Voice of Maldives	Overall performance in the show		Nominated	
2010	Maldives Video Music Awards	Best Duet Song	"Vindhu Hithaa" from E Dharifulhu (along with Mohamed Abdul Ghanee)	Won	
