= Sirru =

- Official film poster
- Directed by: Hussain Adhil
- Screenplay by: Mariyam Moosa
- Produced by: Villager Maldives
- Starring: Reeko Moosa Manik; Shiznee; Rizla; Arifa Ibrahim; Chilhiya Moosa Manik; Ibrahim Rasheed; Jamsheedha Ahmed
- Cinematography: Hussain Adhil
- Edited by: Hussain Adhil
- Production company: Image Village
- Release date: 1998
- Country: Maldives
- Language: Dhivehi

Sirru (transl. Secret) is a 1998 Maldivian drama film directed by Hussain Adhil. Produced by Villager Maldives, the film stars Reeko Moosa Manik, Shiznee, Rizla, Arifa Ibrahim, Chilhiya Moosa Manik and Jamsheedha Ahmed in pivotal roles.

== Premise ==
Shaliya (Shiznee) is happily married to Rilwan (Reeko Moosa Manik) who secretly is married to Jeeza (Jamsheedha Ahmed). Envious of Rilwan's affection towards Shaliya, Jeeza planned to snatch him away from Shaliya by spreading false rumors regarding her. Shaliya suffered a miscarriage due to an accident while Jeeza was blessed with the news of her pregnancy. Meanwhile, Rilwan is having an affair with a third woman Seema (Rizla), a colleague from Airport.

== Cast ==
- Reeko Moosa Manik as Rilwan
- Aishath Shiznee as Shaliya
- Mariyam Rizla as Seema
- Arifa Ibrahim as Rilwan's mother
- Chilhiya Moosa Manik as Thaufeeq
- Ibrahim Rasheed as Qasim
- Jamsheedha Ahmed as Jeeza

== Soundtrack ==
Track listing
No.	Title	Lyrics	Singer(s)	Length
1.	"Vaaloabi Aalaa"	Ahmed Sharumeel	Shifa Thaufeeq, Umar Zahir
2.	"Aadheyhekey Kuran Magey"	Boi Ahmed Khaleel	Fazeela Amir
3.	"Lavvaandhey"		Mohamed Huzam
4.	"Jaadhoo Ekey Kalaa Hedhee"	Ahmed Sharumeel	Ibrahim Amir, Rafiyath Rameeza
5.	"Moosun Haaufaa"		Fazeela Amir, Abdul Hannan Moosa Didi
