= Hiyy Halaaku =

- Official film poster
- Directed by: Hussain Adil
- Screenplay by: Hussain Adil; Mariyam Moosa
- Produced by: Shiham Rasheed
- Starring: Yoosuf Shafeeu; Niuma Mohamed; Sheela Najeeb
- Cinematography: Hussain Adil; Ali Rasheed
- Edited by: Hussain Adil
- Music by: Maars; Imad Ismail
- Production company: Farivaa Films
- Release date: 2000
- Country: Maldives
- Language: Dhivehi

Hiyy Halaaku (English translation: Heartbreak) is a 2000 Maldivian romantic drama film directed by Hussain Adil. Produced under Motion Pictures, the film stars Yoosuf Shafeeu, Niuma Mohamed and Sheela Najeeb in pivotal roles. The plot combines two love triangles set years apart. The first half covers friends on a college campus, while the second tells the story of a widower's young daughter who tries to reunite her dad with his old friend. The film was an unofficial remake of Karan Johar's romantic drama film Kuch Kuch Hota Hai (1998).

== Premise ==
The film opens showing the strong bond between Shahil (Yoosuf Shafeeu) and his best friend, tomboy Fazlee (Niuma Mohamed) who are popular students at college. Although they are very close, both of them deny any romantic feelings for each other. They are then introduced to the college principal Mr. Shameel's (Ali Shameel) daughter Zeena (Sheela Najeeb) who joined the college from Oxford University to finish her degree. Zeena quickly becomes friends with Shahil and Fazlee while Shahil constantly flirts with Zeena, trying to win over her. As times fly by, Fazlee realises her true affection towards Shahil but before she is able to declare her feelings, she discovers that Shahil is in love with Zeena.

== Cast ==
- Yoosuf Shafeeu as Shahil Hannan
- Niuma Mohamed as Fazlee Shareef
- Sheela Najeeb as Zeena Saleem
- Ibrahim Giyas as Aiman
- Mariyam Sheleen as Aminath Fazlee
- Fauziyya Hassan as Shahil's mother
- Arifa Ibrahim as Fazlee's mother
- Ali Shameel as Saleem
- Neena Saleem as Ms. Sharafiyya
- Hussain Shibau as Albeyla
- Amjad Ibrahim as Fathimath Shifa's parent
- Suneetha Ali (special appearance in the song "Thiya Loabi Handhaanveema")

== Development ==
Initially, Aishath Shiranee was cast in the role of Fazlee, with nearly half of the filming completed before she withdrew due to health issues. Mariyam Nisha was then brought in to replace her, but after filming a small portion, she was ultimately replaced by Niuma Mohamed.

== Soundtrack ==
Track listing
No.	Title	Lyrics	Singer(s)	Length
1.	"Habarudhaarey Zuvaanaa Ey"	Ahmed Sharumeel	Ibrahim Amir, Fazeela Amir	6:36
2.	"Vevunee Gayaa"	Ahmed Sharumeel	Ibrahim Amir, Fazeela Amir	6:36
3.	"Thiya Loabi Handhaanveema"	Ahmed Sharumeel	Fazeela Amir, Ahmed Amir	7:03
4.	"Thuru Thurulaahaa Vey"	Ahmed Sharumeel	Ali Rameez, Fazeela Amir	4:56
5.	"Kudhi Kudhivaathee Ey"	Ahmed Sharumeel	Fazeela Amir	1:26
6.	"Shaamilvee Hithugaa Ey"	Ahmed Sharumeel	Ahmed Amir, Fazeela Amir	7:14
7.	"Farudhaa Nagaa Ehlaalaashey"	Ahmed Sharumeel	Ahmed Amir, Fazeela Amir	6:23
8.	"Dhevvaashe Kudakudhinnah"	Binmaa Ibrahim Waheedh
