= Kuhveriya =

- Official film poster
- Directed by: Mohamed Rasheed
- Written by: Fathimath Nahula
- Screenplay by: Fathimath Nahula
- Produced by: Villager Maldives
- Starring: Moosa Zakariyya; Ismail Hilmy; Aishath Jaleel; Zeenath Abbas
- Cinematography: Ahmed Shaneez; Hussain Mauzoom; Abdulla Shafeeq; Abdul Latheef; Mohamed Rasheed
- Edited by: Mohamed Rasheed
- Music by: Shaaz
- Release date: 1998
- Country: Maldives
- Language: Dhivehi

Kuhveriya is a 1998 Maldivian drama film edited and directed by Mohamed Rasheed. Produced by Villager Maldives, the film stars Moosa Zakariyya, Ismail Hilmy, Aishath Jaleel and Zeenath Abbas in pivotal roles.

== Premise ==
A happily married couple, Nimal and Zeeniya (Ismail Hilmy and Aishath Jaleel) along with their daughter like sister, Reema, go on vacation where Zeeniya disappears. Although the civilians search the whole island, she is nowhere to be found and is pronounced to be dead. Years later, Reema now fully grown up, visits Male' from abroad and is romantically attracted to Nimal's brother, Shaheem (Moosa Zakariyya). Complications arise, when a servant is brought into the house who surprisingly looks similar to Zeeniya.

== Cast ==
- Moosa Zakariyya as Shaheem
- Ismail Hilmy as Nimal
- Aishath Jaleel as Zeeniya
- Zeenath Abbas as Reema
- Ageela Naeem
- Ahmed Rasheed
- Ali Hussain
- Abdulla Yoosuf
- Ibrahim Rasheed
- Hafeez
- Saajan

== Soundtrack ==
Track listing
No.	Title	Lyrics	Singer(s)	Length
1.	"Dheyshey Loabin Araam"	Ahmed Sharumeel	Umar Zahir
2.	"Yaaraa Ahaashey Aashiq Magey Thee"		Mohamed Huzam
3.	"Loabivey Yaar Loabivey"	Adam Haleem Adnan	Ibrahim Amir, Fazeela Amir
4.	"Dhanveemahey"		Mohamed Rashad
