= Veeraana =

- Official film poster
- Directed by: Yoosuf Shafeeu
- Written by: Fathimath Nahula
- Screenplay by: Fathimath Nahula
- Produced by: Mohamed Abdulla; Fathimath Nahula
- Starring: Yoosuf Shafeeu; Niuma Mohamed; Amira Ismail
- Cinematography: Hussain Munawwar; Ibrahim Moosa
- Edited by: Yoosuf Shafeeu
- Music by: Ibrahim Zaid Ali
- Production companies: Dhekedheke Ves Production; Crytsal Entertainment
- Release date: May 28, 2010
- Country: Maldives
- Language: Dhivehi

Veeraana is a 2010 drama film directed by Yoosuf Shafeeu. Co-produced by Mohamed Abdulla and Fathimath Nahula under Dhekedheke Ves Production and Crytsal Entertainment, the film stars Yoosuf Shafeeu, Niuma Mohamed and Amira Ismail in pivotal roles. The film was released on 28 May 2010.

== Plot ==
Reena (Niuma Mohamed) and Saajila (Amira Ismail) meets Shahin (Yoosuf Shafeeu) at a masquerade ball and he falls in love with Reena. Meanwhile, Saajila expresses her admirance towards a person she met at the same party. Reena agreed to be friends with Shahin on a condition; he should never love her in any circumstances. However Shahin expresses his endearment towards Reena. She shared the incidence with Saajila and she talked her out of it. Reena divulged that she has an artificial pacemaker inserted to her body and she wants to spend the rest of her life with no strain. It was revealed that she has a valve leak in her nervous system and she is advice to refrain from being involved in any exhausting work.

Shahin and Reena marries while Saajila departs to Australia to complete a course of three years. Reena died during childbirth. Before her death, she adjured Reena to marry Shahin when she passes away. Reena begged to differ, till she finds a photograph of Shahin; whom she liked during the party. Witnessing her affection towards his daughter Zeena (Aminath Samiya), Shahin proposed Saajila for marriage. Shahin and Saajila marries and lives in an island with Zeena and Saajila's uncle Habeeb (Ali Firaq).

Habeeb heard two men talking about Zeena, infusing his mind with sexual excitement. Shahin got a job from a private company and decided to settle in Male' for a while. One day, when Saajila went for parent teacher's meeting, Habeeb sexually abused nine years old Zeena, threatening her to kill her father if she reveals the truth to him. Noticing a change in her behavior, Saajila discovered her uncle sexual assaulting her step-daughter. Unsure of its aftermath, Saajila decided to hide the truth from Shahin. Seeing bruises on Zeena's leg Shahin questions her, but she lies it as an injury during a fall. One night, Shahin saw Habeeb coming out of Zeena's toilet and was disturbed by it. The other day, Saajila found him moving out of Zeena's room and attacks her uncle. He pushed her to the wall and escapes.

The following night, Shahin decided to discuss the reasons for Zeena's idle life with Habeeb and was distraught to see bruises on his back. Suspicious of events, Shahin went to Zeena's room, where he saw Habeeb's watch on the floor. Shahin discovered the truth; Habeeb has been sexually abusing Zeena for over two years. Enraged, Shahin stabbed Habeeb on road and murdered him. He dragged Habeeb's body to Atoll's Office and surrenders.

== Cast ==
- Yoosuf Shafeeu as Shahin
- Amira Ismail as Saajila
- Niuma Mohamed as Reena
- Ali Firaq as Habeeb
- Aminath Samiya as Zeena
- Hamdhan Farooq as school supervisor (Special appearance)
- Ahmed Nimal as government official (Special appearance)
- Ahmed Saeed as government official (Special appearance)
- Mohamed Faisal as Reena's friend (Special appearance)
- Koyya Hassan Manik as Shahin's boss (Special appearance)

== Soundtrack ==
Track listing
No.	Title	Lyrics	Singer(s)	Length
1.	"Veeraana" (Promotional song)	Adam Haleem Adnan	Ibrahim Zaid Ali, Mohamed Abdul Ghanee, Mariyam Ashfa, Unoosha, Mohamed Majid, Aminath Shanee, Rafiyath Rameeza, Lahufa Faiz, Mohamed Farhad, Fathimath Zoona, Hassan Jalaal, Ahmed Ibrahim, Ahmed Shabeen, Aminath Shaufa Saeed, Moosa Samau, Majeedh Ismail	5:18
2.	"Veeraana Vefaa Vaa Hayaai Magey"	Adam Haleem Adnan	Rafiyath Rameeza, Ibrahim Zaid Ali	3:57
3.	"Vindhuthah Mihithugaa"	Adam Haleem Adnan	Mumthaz Moosa	4:04
4.	"Vee Banavefaa"	Adam Haleem Adnan	Mohamed Abdul Ghanee	4:40
5.	"Mausoom Hiy"	Adam Haleem Adnan	Moonisa Khaleel, Ibrahim Zaid Ali	4:52
6.	"Hooreh Hey Thee"	Adam Haleem Adnan	Ibrahim Zaid Ali	4:58

== Accolades ==
Award	Category	Recipients	Result	Ref.
2nd Maldives Film Awards	Best Actor	Yoosuf Shafeeu	Nominated	
2nd Maldives Film Awards	Best Supporting Actor	Ali Firaq	Nominated	
2nd Maldives Film Awards	Best Child Artist	Aminath Samiyya	Won	
6th Gaumee Film Awards	Best Film	Veeraana	Nominated	
6th Gaumee Film Awards	Best Actor	Yoosuf Shafeeu	Nominated	
6th Gaumee Film Awards	Best Supporting Actress	Aminath Samiyya	Nominated	
6th Gaumee Film Awards	Best Lyricist	Adam Haleem Adnan for "Vindhuthah Mihithuga"	Nominated	
6th Gaumee Film Awards	Best Male Playback Singer	Mohamed Abdul Ghanee for "Vee Banavefaa Adhu Falhuvefaa"	Nominated	
6th Gaumee Film Awards	Best Female Playback Singer	Moonisa Khaleel for "Mausoom Hiyy"	Nominated	
6th Gaumee Film Awards	Best Editing	Yoosuf Shafeeu	Nominated	
