= Fazeela Amir =

Maldivian female singer

- Born: 16 December 1969 (age 56); Male', Maldives
- Occupation: Playback singer
- Years active: 1993–present
- Musical career
- Genres: Pop; filmi; electronic
- Instrument: Vocals

Fazeela Amir (16 December 1969) is a Maldivian singer.

== Early life ==
Fazeela Amir was born and raised in the "Amir family" where several artists including Ahmed Amir and Ibrahim Amir were brought up and "ruled" the music industry. She made her career debut with the album Hiyy Fahi where she lent her voice for eleven songs in the album. This resulted in her receiving several offers from music directors and producers to sing for their films and albums before making her breakthrough with her "high-pitched" rendition of the songs in the 1994 released film Dheriyaa. Her duets with Ali Rameez are well noted in the industry and maximum duets with Rameez are recorded by Amir. In 1998, the Government of Maldives honoured her with the National Award of Recognition. She remained as one of the most commercially successful and popular local artists till 2004, where the local scene of studio albums continued to trend downward. At the 3rd Gaumee Film Awards ceremony, Amir was bestowed as the Best Female Playback Singer for her vocal performance in the song "Mihitha Loabi Dheynan" from Amaanaaiy (1998). In 2018, Air was ranked fourth in the list of the "Most Desired Comeback Voices", compiled by Dho?.

== Discography ==
=== Feature film ===
Year	Film	Song	Lyricist(s)	Co-artist(s)	Notes
1994	Dheriyaa	"Aavaa Adhu Khiyaalakee"	Abdul Muhaimin	Solo	1st recorded song
1994	Dheriyaa	"Vakivee Asaraa Manzaru"	Abdulla Sodhiq	Solo	
1994	Dheriyaa	"Magey Shaanu Velee"	Abdulla Sodhiq	Mohamed Rashad	
1994	Dheriyaa	"Magey Loabi Dharifulhaa"	Abdulla Sodhiq	Mohamed Rashad	
1994	Dheriyaa	"Aadhey Miadhu Dhaan"	Abdulla Sodhiq	Abdul Rasheed (Absy)	
1994	Dheriyaa	"Numekeki Huregen"	Abdulla Sodhiq	Ahmed Amir	
1997	Hinithun	"Edheveythee Adhu Hurevey"	Ahmed Sharumeel	Ali Rameez	
1997	Laila	"Vaathee Ma Kaireegaa"	Fathimath Nahula	Ali Rameez	
1997	Laila	"Dhinveynugaa Aawaaraa Vey" (Female Version)	Fathimath Nahula	Solo	
1997	Heelaiy	"Vaanee Ahaa"	Abdul Muhaimin	Umar Zahir	
1998	Sirru	"Aadheyhekey Kuran Magey"	Boi Ahmed Khaleel	Solo	
1998	Sirru	"Moosun Haaufaa"	Kaneeru Abdul Raheem	Abdul Hannan Moosa Didi	
1998	Kuhveriya	"Loabivey Yaaru Loabivey"	Adam Haleem Adnan	Ibrahim Amir	
1998	Amaanaaiy	"Mihithaa Loabi Dheynan"	Mausoom Shakir	Ali Rameez	Gaumee Film Award for Best Female Playback Singer
1999	Qurbaani	"Han'dhaaneh Aaveehey"	Ahmed Sharumeel	Ibrahim Amir	
1999	Qurbaani	"Baaghunne Fenilaa"		Solo	
2000	2000 Vana Ufan Dhuvas	"Hinithun Velaashey Malaa Ey"	Easa Shareef	Imaadh Ismail	
2000	2000 Vana Ufan Dhuvas	"Fini Roalhi Beeheneeyey"	Easa Shareef	Abdul Hannan Moosa Didi	
2000	Hiyy Halaaku	"Khabarudhaarey Zuvaanaa Ey"	Ahmed Sharumeel	Ibrahim Amir	
2000	Hiyy Halaaku	"Vevunee Gayaa"	Ahmed Sharumeel	Ibrahim Amir	
2000	Hiyy Halaaku	"Vindhaa Gulhaa Ley"	Ahmed Sharumeel	Ali Rameez	
2000	Hiyy Halaaku	"Shaamilvee Hithugaa Ey"	Ahmed Sharumeel	Ahmed Amir	
2000	Hiyy Halaaku	"Thiya Loabi Han'dhaanveemaa Ey"	Ahmed Sharumeel	Ahmed Amir	
2000	Hiyy Halaaku	"Farudhaa Nagaa Ellaalaashey"	Ahmed Sharumeel	Ahmed Amir	
2000	Hiyy Halaaku	"Hiyy Roanethaa Ey Kudhi KUdhivaathee Ey"	Ahmed Sharumeel	Solo	
2000	Hiyy Halaaku	"Hindhu Emaa Kan'dutherey"	Moosa Ali	Solo	
2000	Zalzalaa	"Vejjey Ma Hairaan"	Abdul Hannan Moosa Didi	Ali Rameez	
2000	Hithu Vindhu	"Fennaane Heevey Maraa Loa"		Ibrahim Amir	
2000	Hithu Vindhu	"Haalu Kiyaadhenhey"	Boi Ahmed Khaleel	Ali Rameez	
2000	Majubooru Loabi	"Annaanenyaa Angaalaa"		Ibrahim Amir	
2000	Majubooru Loabi	"Mirey Gaathugaa Hurumey Yaaraa"		Mukhthar Adam	
2000	Majubooru Loabi	"Vaigadhavaan Fesheethaa Ey"		Ahmed Amir	
2000	Naaummeedhu	"Saadhavileyrey"	Boi Ahmed Khaleel	Ali Rameez	
2001	Aaah	"Vee Athuga Hifanhey"	Easa Shareef	Ibrahim Amir	
2001	Dheevaanaa	"Hiyy Masthy Ishqu"	Mariyam Waheedha	Ahmed Amir (AIMS)	
2001	Dheevaanaa	"Levvi Naseebey Mee Kihaa"	Mariyam Waheedha	Imaadh Ismail	
2001	Hilihilaa	"Fun Inthizaarehgaa"	Easa Shareef	Solo	
2001	Hithi Nimun	"Sirru Sirrun Annaashey"	Mariyam Waheedha	Abdulla Althaf Shakir (Altho)	
2001	Hiiy Edhenee	"Moonu Nuforuvaashey"	Boi Ahmed Khaleel	Ali Rameez	Appears in Soundtrack album
2001	Hiyy Heyokuraathi	"Theeyey Hayaathun"	Ahmed Haleem	Ali Rameez, Lubaina	
2001	Ranmuiy	"Ey Aashiqaa"	Kopee Mohamed Rasheed	Ali Rameez	
2001	Ranmuiy	"Bahdhal Vumun Vejje Dheewaanaa"	Easa Shareef	Ibrahim Amir	
2001	Ranmuiy	"Oh My God"	Abdul Muhaimin	Ibrahim Amir	
2001	Ranmuiy	"An'dhuneh Alhuvaa"	Abdul Muhaimin	Ahmed Amir	
2001	Ranmuiy	"Loabin Dhehiyy"	Abdul Muhaimin	Solo	
2001	Ranmuiy	"Loabin Kuramey Aadheys"	Abdul Muhaimin	Solo	Appears in Soundtrack album
2002	Loabi Nuvevununama	"Mihithuge Loaiybey Thee"	Mausoom Shakir	Ali Rameez	
2002	30 Dhuvas	"Fahu Huvafen"	Aminath Moosa	Ahmed Amir	
2002	30 Dhuvas	"Veemey Ufalugaa"		Solo	
2002	Aan... Aharenves Loabivin	"Hiyy Edhey Varunne"	Kopee Mohamed Rasheed	Umar Zahir	
2002	Aan... Aharenves Loabivin	"Huvafen Dhekeynee"	Easa Shareef	Ali Rameez	
2002	Aan... Aharenves Loabivin	"Reethi Han'dhuvaree Reygaa"	Adam Haleem Adhnan	Mukhthar Adam	
2002	Aan... Aharenves Loabivin	"Fenumun Govaalee"	Mausoom Shakir	Mukhthar Adam	Appears in Soundtrack album
2002	Aan... Aharenves Loabivin	"Vilaathah Ehvaneeyey"	Mausoom Shakir	Mohamed Huzam	
2003	Edhi Edhi Hoadheemey	"Hithutherey Miloabi Fevunas"	Kopee Mohamed Rasheed	Hassan Ilham	
2004	Eynaa	"Mihiyy Adhu"	Ahmed Nashid (Dharavandhoo)	Mukhthar Adam	
2005	Hureemey Inthizaarugaa	"Firumunthakun Thedhey"	Easa Shareef	Solo	
2005	Hureemey Inthizaarugaa	"Moosun Genesdhey Nayaa"	Easa Shareef	Ibrahim Amir	Appears in Soundtrack album
2006	Hukuru Vileyrey	"Huree Nazaru Dheyn"	Ahmed Nashid (Dharavandhoo)	Solo	
2006	Hiyani	"Aadhey Araamu Edhemey"	Adam Haleem Adnan	Solo	
2006	Hiyani	"Dhaashey Yaaraa"	Adam Haleem Adnan	Mumthaz Moosa	
2010	Mi Hiyy Keekkuraanee?	"Haadha Asaru Hithugaa Veyey"		Solo	
2018	Thiya Loaibaa Dhurah	"Aavaa Han'dhaaney"	Boi Ahmed Khaleel	Ali Rameez	
2018	Thiya Loaibaa Dhurah	"Abadhume Fahathun"	Boi Ahmed Khaleel	Ibrahim Amir	

=== Short films ===
Year	Title	Song	Lyricist(s)	Co-artist(s)	Notes
2004	Dheke Dhekeves 1	"Meheboob Magey"		Mukhthar Adam	
2008	Guest House Room Number:201	"Meheboob Magey"		Mukhthar Adam	

=== Television ===
Year	Title	Song	Lyricist(s)	Co-artist(s)	Notes
1997	Huvafaiy	"Ishaaraaiykoh Balaalaanee"	Mausoom Shakir	Ali Rameez	
1998	Raalhubaani	"Bunebala Ladhuganefaa"	Mausoom Shakir	Ali Rameez	
1999	Maafkuraashey	"Jaadhoogar Dheythee Aniyaa"	Boi Ahmed Khaleel	Ali Rameez	
1999	Ramlaa	"Heelaa Gothey Dhen"	Ahmed Sharumeel	Solo	
2005	Fukkashi	"Mulhi Dhuniye Ekee Milkuviyas"	Kopee Mohamed Rasheed	Solo	
2005	Fukkashi	"Dhogu Hedhumee Aadhahey"	Kopee Mohamed Rasheed	Solo	
2005	Fukkashi	"Moonaa Moonu Kairiveemaa"	Kopee Mohamed Rasheed	Ibrahim Amir	
2018	Shakuvaa Akaa Nulaa	"Midhekey Huvafen"	Boi Ahmed Khaleel	Ahmed Amir	

=== Non-film songs ===
Year	Album/Single	Song	Lyricist(s)	Co-artist(s)
1993	Hiyyfahi	"Dhaneehe Aisbalaa"	Abdulla Afeef	Ibrahim Amir
1993	Hiyyfahi	"Dhen Dhen Dhen Haamavaa"	Abdulla Afeef	Ibrahim Amir
1993	Hiyyfahi	"Ran'galhah Ulhen Ma Visnaanan"	Abdulla Afeef	Mohamed Rashad
1993	Hiyyfahi	"Ufaadhey Himeynvee Mi Dhanvaru"	Abdulla Afeef	Mohamed Rashad
1993	Hiyyfahi	"Dhakkaa Manzaru Chaaloo Balaalan"	Abdulla Afeef	Mohamed Rashad
1993	Hiyyfahi	"Seedhaa Hithaa Khiyaalaa"	Abdulla Afeef	Mohamed Rashad
1993	Hiyyfahi	"Gendhaavaru Nuvaneehey"	Abdulla Afeef	Mohamed Rashad
1993	Hiyyfahi	"Javvaa Ufaa Fazaa Ey"	Abdulla Afeef	Mohamed Rashad
1993	Hiyyfahi	"Balan Thibegen Mihen"	Abdulla Afeef	Solo
1993	Hiyyfahi	"Heyohithun Maruhabaa"	Abdulla Afeef	Solo
1993	Hiyyfahi	"Haalu Loabeege Kiyaidhemey"	Adam Haleem Adnan	Mohamed Shahuban
1995	Hiyyfahi 2	"Mirey Beehileemaa"	Easa Shareef	Abdul Hannan Moosa Didi
1995	Hiyyfahi 2	"Yaaraa Viyey Azum"		Umar Zahir
1995	Hiyyfahi 2	"Ahaaney Kaaku Adhu Huree"		Solo
1995	Hiyyfahi 2	"Thiki Thelhee Dhethiki Fen Thelhee"		Solo
1995	Hiyyfahi 2	"Vaanee Loabin Ekee Dhaashey"		Mohamed Rashad
1995	Hiyyfahi 2	"Ishqee Athun Hiyy Nagaafaa"		Mohamed Rashad
1995	Hiyyfahi 2	"Zum Zum Zum"		Ibrahim Amir
1995	Hiyyfahi 2	"Dheegen Thihen Nazaru"	Abdulla Afeef	Ibrahim Amir
1995	Hiyyfahi 2	"Kiyaadhevidhaanehey"	Abdulla Afeef	Ibrahim Amir
1995	Hiyyfahi 2	"Zuvaan Zuvaan Hiyy Magey"		Abdul Baaree
1996	Fiyavahi	"Heeleemaahey Yaaraa Dhanee"		Ahmed Amir
1996	Fiyavahi	"Loabivey Yaaru Loabivey"	Adam Haleem Adnan	Ibrahim Amir
1996	Fiyavahi	"Moosun Haaufaa"	Kaneeru Abdul Raheem	Abdul Hannan Moosa Didi
1996	Misraab	"Keeh Mivanee"	Ahmed Haleem	Umar Zahir
1996	Misraab	"Hiyy Dhen Kuree Kon Kushehhey"	Easa Shareef	Ahmed Amir
1996	Shakuvaa	"Heelun Thi Foruvee Ladhunhey"	Ahmed Shakeeb	Abdul Hannan Moosa Didi
1996	Fashuvi	"Un'gulhaa Un'gulhaa"	Ahmed Sharumeel	Solo
1996	Fashuvi	"Jaaney Dhoovi Jaan"	Ahmed Sharumeel	Ali Rameez, Rafiyath Rameeza, Ibrahim Amir
1996	Fashuvi	"Leykarunun Dheewaanaa Dhen"	Ahmed Sharumeel	Ibrahim Amir
1996	Fashuvi	"Thiki Thiki Thih Vehemun"	Ahmed Sharumeel	Ibrahim Amir
1996	Fashuvi	"Mee Fala Husband"	Ahmed Sharumeel	Ibrahim Amir
1996	Fashuvi	"Hiyy Edheyney Yaaru Fenilaashey"	Ahmed Sharumeel	Ahmed Amir
1996	Fashuvi	"Reyrey Thedhey Loabin"	Afeefa Ahmed	Ahmed Amir
1997	Roalhi	"Midhimaa Balaanuhey"	Mausoom Shakir	Ali Rameez
1997	Roalhi	"Ishaaraaiykoh Balaalaanee"	Mausoom Shakir	Ali Rameez
1997	Roalhi	"Rey Nidheegaaves Dhusheemey"	Mausoom Shakir	Ali Rameez
1997	Roalhi	"Bunebala Ladhuganefaa Erey"	Mausoom Shakir	Ali Rameez
1997	Roalhi	"Keiykureveythoa Beli Haalu Angan"	Mausoom Shakir	Solo
1997	Roalhi	"Hiyy Ufaa Kuraanamey"	Mausoom Shakir	Solo
1997	Asseyri	"Kiyaaladhee Kiyaaladhee"	Mausoom Shakir	Ali Rameez, Abdul Sameeu
1997	Asseyri	"Fin'dinuvaashey"	Ahmed Sharumeel	Solo
1997	Asseyri	"Kuraaneyey Mi Loabin Majalugaa"		Abdul Sameeu
1997	Asseyri	"Roalanthoa Vee Dhen"		Ibrahim Amir
1997	Sarindhaa	"Haadha Edhen Kairin Dheken"	Easa Shareef	Abdul Hannan Moosa Didi
1997	Sarindhaa	"Sirru Sirrun Kuri Ishaaraaiy"	Easa Shareef	Abdul Hannan Moosa Didi
1997	Sarindhaa	"Khiyaalu Hithuge Dhiraa"	Ahmed Sharumeel	Solo
1997	Sarindhaa	"Meridheyey Loa Rakiveemaa"	Ahmed Sharumeel	Umar Zahir
1997	Sarindhaa	"Kollan Kollaa Khiyaal Kureemey"	Ahmed Sharumeel	Ibrahim Amir
1997	Sarindhaa	"Bunee Vaaloabi Neyngeyhey"	Ahmed Sharumeel	Ali Rameez
1997	Sarindhaa	"Edheveythee Adhu Hurevey" (Bonus Song)	Ahmed Sharumeel	Ali Rameez
1997	Raalhu	"Khiyaalugaa Vee E Vaudhaa"	Tharaboozu Ahmed Riza	Umar Zahir
1997	Raalhu	"Mithaa Mihuree Loaiybakun"	Tharaboozu Ahmed Riza	Solo
1997	Mathaaran	"Gandhemey Chaalu Han'dhey Thee"	Ahmed Sharumeel	Ibrahim Amir
1997	Kurunees	"Furaana Dheyshey"		Ahmed Amir
1997	Shabnam	"Haadha Araameh Vey"	Easa Shareef	Solo
1997	Shabnam	"O Dheewaanaa Dhen Vedhaaney"	Ahmed Sharumeel	Solo
1997	Shabnam	"Loabinhey Heelanvee"	Ahmed Sharumeel	Solo
1997	Shabnam	"Ey Jaadhoo Ey Malaa"	Ahmed Sharumeel	Solo
1997	Shabnam	"Zoobee Zoobee Zaleyzoo"	Ahmed Sharumeel	Solo
1997	Shabnam	"Yaaraa Hoadhaali Reyrey"	Ahmed Sharumeel	Solo
1997	Shabnam	"Beynunveehaa Loabi Mee"	Ahmed Sharumeel	Solo
1997	Shabnam	"Aadhey Dhee Jaanaa Ehee"	Ahmed Sharumeel	Solo
1997	Shabaab	"Dheefa Loabi Faalhugaa"	Ahmed Shakeeb	Ali Rameez
1997	Thasveeru	"Vaathee Ma Kaireegaa" (Bonus Song)	Fathimath Nahula	Ali Rameez
1997	Single	"Neyngumahvure Vakin Dhera Kameh"	Abdulla Sodhiq	Various Artists
1998	Kalhi	"Aadheyhekey Kuran Magey"		Solo
1998	Arutha	"Ehoadhi Ufaathakaa"		Mukhthar Adam
1998	Meeraa	"Kuran'gi Dheloa"	Kopee Mohamed Rasheed	Umar Zahir
1998	Meeraa	"Moonaa Moonu Kairiveemaa"	Kopee Mohamed Rasheed	Ibrahim Amir
1998	Meeraa	"Titanic Balan Hiyy Edhey"	Kopee Mohamed Rasheed	Ibrahim Amir
1998	Foni Karuna	"Mihithaa Furaana Edhenee"	Kaneeru Abdul Raheem	Abdul Baaree
1998	Foni Karuna	"Beynumey Nubunan Ulhenyaa"		Abdul Baaree
1998	Sahaaraa 2	"Ajaibu Dhen Nuvaanehey"	Easa Shareef	Solo
1998	Kuran'gi	"Vaa Foni Asaru"	Kaneeru Abdul Raheem	Abdul Hannan Moosa Didi
1998	Foni Zaharu	"Ey Nuruhunvee Dhoa"	Easa Shareef	Abdul Hannan Moosa Didi
1998	Kurikeela	"Thedhu Khiyaalu Kalaa"	Kopee Mohamed Rasheed	Umar Zahir
1998	Kurikeela	"Dhogu Hedhumee Aadhahey"	Kopee Mohamed Rasheed	Solo
1998	Vidhuvaru	"Innanee Kalhives Jahaalan"	Ahmed Sharumeel	Asim Thaufeeq
1998	Vidhuvaru	"Badhal Dhen Vanee Dhoa"	Ahmed Sharumeel	Asim Thaufeeq
1998	Thaureef	"Loabidhee Loabidhee"	Boi Ahmed Khaleel	Solo
1999	Adhaarasam	"Soora Theeye Hiyy Edhey"		Solo
1999	Adhaarasam	"Dhiyaimaa Loabi Mihithah Dheefaa"		Ali Rameez
1999	Adhaarasam	"Kuraathee Dhen Asaru"		Umar Zahir
1999	Adhaarasam	"Hinithunve Dhurun Feni Annaathee"		Ibrahim Amir
1999	Adhaarasam	"Chaaley Bunaaney"		Mohamed Huzam
1999	Kasthoori	"Foruveehey Moonaa Loa"		Solo
1999	Kasthoori	"Hiyydhee Zuvaanaa"		Ali Rameez
1999	Dhirun	"Moonugaa Loabin Mi Firumaa"	Kopee Mohamed Rasheed	Umar Zahir
1999	Dhirun	"Khiyaalu Kuraahaa Varuthaa'	Ahmed Haleem	Ahmed Amir
1999	Dhirun	"Nuhureveyneyey Roaneyey"	Easa Shareef	Abdul Baaree
1999	Endheyyo	"Uraalaa Hiyy Ufaakoh"		Solo
1999	Giritee	"Aavaa Han'dhaaney"	Boi Ahmed Khaleel	Ali Rameez
1999	Giritee	"Abadhume Fahathun"	Boi Ahmed Khaleel	Ibrahim Amir
1999	Giritee	"Han'dhaaneh Aaveehey"	Ahmed Sharumeel	Ibrahim Amir
1999	Giritee	"O Reema O Reema"	Ahmed Sharumeel	Ibrahim Amir
1999	Giritee	"Vaathee Han'dhaanugaa"		Ahmed Amir
1999	Giritee	"Baaghunne Fenilaa"		Solo
1999	Giritee	"Eyge Veynun"		Solo
1999	Ishq	"Fun Loabinney Eynaa"		Ahmed Amir
1999	Mahinooru	"Han'dhuvaru Therey"	Kopee Mohamed Rasheed	Ibrahim Amir
1999	Mahinooru	"Mulhi Dhuniye Ekee Milkuviyas"	Kopee Mohamed Rasheed	Solo
1999	Raaya	"Hiyy Ufaa Vaanee Mihaa"		Solo
1999	Rahmedhu	"Vindhaa Gulhaa Ley"	Ahmed Sharumeel	Ali Rameez
1999	Rukkuri	"Jaadhoogar Dheythee Aniyaa"	Boi Ahmed Khaleel	Ali Rameez
1999	Rukkuri	"Dhenhey Mi Loabeege Hadhiyaa"	Boi Ahmed Khaleel	Solo
1999	Shikaara	"Hithugaavi Asaru En'gumun"	Ahmed Shakeeb	Solo
1999	Vara	"Fajuru Tharihen Vidhaalaathee"	Kopee Mohamed Rasheed	Abdul Baaree
1999	Sameydhaan	"Yaaraa Hoadhan Noolhe Huriyyaa"	Ahmed Sharumeel	Ibrahim Amir
1999	Sameydhaan	Inthihaa Loabivey"	Ahmed Sharumeel	Ibrahim Amir
1999	Sameydhaan	"Kehidheynamey"	Ahmed Sharumeel	Ibrahim Amir
1999	Sameydhaan	"Ehee Vedheynee Kaakuhey"	Ahmed Sharumeel	Ibrahim Amir
1999	Sameydhaan	"Heelaa Gothey Dhen"	Ahmed Sharumeel	Solo
1999	Sameydhaan	"Fennaathee Balanyaa Loabin"	Ahmed Sharumeel	Ahmed Amir
1999	Sameydhaan	"Hithuge Hithuge Vindhun"	Adam Haleem Adnan	Ahmed Amir
1999	Single	"Thiyahen Nudhaashey Mithuraa"		Ali Rameez
2000	Fanvaiy	"Yaaraa Aimaa"	Ahmed Sharumeel	Ahmed Amir
2000	Fanvaiy	"Beynunvanee Yaaraa"	Ahmed Sharumeel	Ahmed Amir
2000	Moosum	"Vevunee Gayaa"	Ahmed Sharumeel	Ibrahim Amir
2000	Moosum	"Khabarudhaarey Zuvaanaa"	Ahmed Sharumeel	Ibrahim Amir
2000	Moosum	"Shaamilvee Hithugaa Ey"	Ahmed Sharumeel	Ahmed Amir
2000	Moosum	"Malakaa Magey Annaaneyhey"	Ahmed Sharumeel	Ahmed Amir
2000	Thoonu	"Nubune Dhiyaimaa Reyga Kalaa"	Mausoom Shakir	Mohamed Huzam
2000	Thoonu	"Hiyy Hadhiyaa Kohfaa"	Mausoom Shakir	Mohamed Huzam
2000	Thoonu	"Hiyygaimey Haadhahaa Kalaa"	Mausoom Shakir	Abdul Baaree
2000	Thoonu	"Beynumee Javaabehhey"	Mausoom Shakir	Abdul Baaree
2000	Thoonu	"Annaathee Maadhurun"	Mausoom Shakir	Solo
2000	Maazee	"Kan'buloa Boli Hilanyaa"		Mukhthar Adam
2000	Koadi	"Hinithunvelaashey Malaa Ey"	Easa Shareef	Imaadh Ismail
2000	Koadi	"Fini Roalhi Beeheneeyey"	Easa Shareef	Abdul Hannan Moosa Didi
2000	Namaves	"Vaguthu Hin'gaa Goiy Nubalaa"	Easa Shareef	Solo
2000	Inthihaa	"Bunaashey Loabivey"		Umar Zahir
2000	Inthihaa	"En'geyneyhen Ma Kiyaadhenhey"		Ahmed Athif
2000	Inthihaa	"Fari Fari Nala Harakaaiy"		Ahmed Amir
2000	Inthihaa	"Gaathunney Dhushee"		Abdul Hannan Moosa Didi
2000	Esfiya	" Bune Bune Bune"		Ibrahim Amir
2000	Esfiya	"Noolheyshe Dhen Gaigoalhivaan"		Ibrahim Amir
2000	Esfiya	"Vaigadhavaan Fesheethaa Ey"		Ahmed Amir
2000	Esfiya	"Mi Dhekey Huvafen"	Boi Ahmed Khaleel	Ahmed Amir
2000	Esfiya	"Haalu Kiyaadhenhey"	Boi Ahmed Khaleel	Ali Rameez
2000	Esfiya	"Mirey Gaathugaa Hurumey Yaaraa"		Mukhthar Adam
2000	Esfiya	"Dhookolleemaa Heyyey"		Solo
2000	Esfiya	"Aadheyhekey Kuran Magey"		Solo
2000	Gumree	"Kalaa Aadheythoa Nunidhaa"	Mausoom Shakir	Mohamed Huzam
2000	Hiyala	"Balaaleemaa Ladhun"		Solo
2000	Hiyala	"Foari Nagamaa Hin'gaa"		Solo
2000	Khareef	"Vee Athuga Hifanhey"	Easa Shareef	Ibrahim Amir
2000	Laat	"Meeyey Kuraa Khiyaal Fikuru"	Abdulla Afeef	Ahmed Amir
2000	Laat	"Nunidheyney Vissaara Vehey Reyrey"	Abdulla Afeef	Solo
2000	Muraka	"Foadhemundhaa Gulshan Chaaloo"		Abdul Baaree
2000	Neyvaa	"Mithuru Fenumaa Ekee"	Kopee Mohamed Rasheed	Solo
2000	Nihaa	"Nukerifa Loabeegaa"		Solo
2000	Rasrana	"Saafu Naazuku Dhehithey"	Adam Haleem Adnan	Abdul Baaree
2000	Rasrana	"Heelaashe Kiyaidhemey"	Adam Haleem Adnan	Ahmed Amir
2000	Rukkuri 2	"Loa Numaraa"	Easa Shareef	Ibrahim Amir
2000	Fun Loabi	"Yaaraa Fikuraavey"	Ahmed Sharumeel	Ahmed Amir
2000	Fun Loabi	"Dheyhugaa Vaahaa Ufaa"		Ahmed Amir
2000	Fun Loabi	"Roashan Mooney Thee Roashan"		Ahmed Amir
2000	Fun Loabi	"Ey Goyyey Dhaneehey"		Ahmed Amir
2000	Fun Loabi	"Hoadheyey Nala Reethi Raanee"		Ahmed Amir
2001	Ranfaunu	"Meehey Mashah Dhin Maqaam"	Boi Ahmed Khaleel	Solo
2001	Ranfaunu	"Thiya Loabi Han'dhaanveemaa Ey"	Ahmed Sharumeel	Ahmed Amir
2001	Ranfaunu	"Fennaane Heevey Maraa Loa"		Ibrahim Amir
2001	Ranfaunu	"Hithaa Beynunvi Gothaa"		Ibrahim Amir
2001	Ranfaunu	"Rashah Dhaahithun"		Hassan Ilham
2001	Ranfaunu	"Hoadhan Nala E Bahaar"		Ali Rameez
2001	Muthee	"Abadhu Edheythee"	Adam Haleem Adnan	Abdul Baaree
2001	Rukkuri 3	"Pepsi Meerey Dhoa" (Pepsi Ad)		Abdul Sameeu
2001	Baaodi	"Haseenaa"		Abdul Sameeu, Ibrahim Nifar (Thihthi)
2001	Gulfaam	"Eynaa Heelee Gothun"	Adam Haleem Adnan	Solo
2001	Gulfaam	"Eynaa Heelee Gothun" (Remix Version)	Adam Haleem Adnan	Solo
2001	Gulfaam	"Vaudhu Uvaalaa"	Ahmed Sharumeel	Solo
2001	Gulfaam	"Foni Bovuneemaa"	Ahmed Sharumeel	Solo
2001	Reyfanaa	"Fennaathee Mithuruge Soora"		Mohamed Ahmed (Dokey)
2001	Sazaa	"Dhaanee Mihen Seedhaa Magun"		Ali Abdul Kareem
2001	Sazaa	"Libeythee Ey Mihithah Sazaa" (Female Version)		Solo
2001	Huvafen	"Masthee Hiyy Ahaashe Bunyey"	Adam Haleem Adnan	Ali Rameez
2001	Randhi	"Dhivehin Kuraa Masverikamey"	Abdul Muhaimin	Ahmed Amir
2002	Kashfu	"Gaathugaa Vun Edhuneemaa"		Solo
2002	Dhanvaru	"Jaadhoogaa Loabeege Jaadhoo"	Ahmed Haleem	Ahmed Amir
2002	Guraha	"Hiyy Edhey Varunne"	Kopee Mohamed Rasheed	Umar Zahir
2002	Guraha	"Huvafen Dhekeynee"	Easa Shareef	Ali Rameez
2002	Nazaru	"Reethi Han'dhuvaree Reygaa"	Easa Shareef	Mukhthar Adam
2002	Thun'di	"Dhinhaa Ufaa Loabivaa"		Solo
2002	Vaudhu	"You Are My Soniya"	Adam Haleem Adnan	Ali Rameez
2003	Single	"Ruhenyaa Loabidhee"	Ahmed Nashid (Dharavandhoo)	Abdul Hannan Moosa Didi
2003	Billoori	"Hiyy Amey Bunan"	Ahmed Nashid (Dharavandhoo)	Abdul Baaree
2003	Billoori	"Reyrey Ekanive Hoadheemey"	Ahmed Nashid (Dharavandhoo)	Abdul Baaree
2003	Hiyyvaru	"Meheboob Magey"		Mukhthar Adam
2003	Hiyyvaru	"Heelaa Beleemaa"		Mukhthar Adam
2003	Dheraha	"Aadhey Fahun Maluge Jaadhuvee Asaru"		Solo
2003	Loabi Loabin	"Hiyy Edhi Govaa Edhumakee"	Ahmed Saleem	Abdul Baaree
2003	Maana	"Rakivaathee Nubalaashey Buneemaa"		Solo
2003	Fannaanun	"Ufaaveri Ekuveri Vetteh"		Various Artists
2004	Hiyy	"Mi Aee Loabivamey Bunaa Hithun"	Adam Naseer Ibrahim	Mukhthar Adam
2004	Hiyy	"Fini Fini Masthee Vayaa"	Adam Haleem Adnan	Abdul Baaree
2004	Yaaraa	"Hithaa Meygaa Mihaaru"	Easa Shareef	Ibrahim Amir
2004	Maamuige Reythah	"Dhanyaa Dhey Hevvaalaafaa"	Abdul Hameed	Solo
2004	Jaadhooga Jeheyne	"Jaadhoogaa Jeheyney"	Ahmed Saleem	Solo
2004	Jaadhooga Jeheyne	"Loabin Kiyanhey Raajaa"	Ahmed Nashid (Dharavandhoo)	Solo
2004	Jaadhooga Jeheyne	"Leykokaalaa Malun"	Ahmed Nashid (Dharavandhoo)	Solo
2004	Jaadhooga Jeheyne	"Mendhan Vumun Mihaa"	Ahmed Nashid (Dharavandhoo)	Mukhthar Adam
2004	Jaadhooga Jeheyne	"Jaanu Dheyn Beynumey"	Adam Haleem Adnan	Ibrahim Amir
2004	Jaadhooga Jeheyne	"Jaadhoogaa Jeheynehey"	Adam Haleem Adnan	Abdul Baaree
2004	Jaadhooga Jeheyne	"Hayaathugaa Libenvaa"	Abdul Muhaimin	Abdul Baaree
2004	Jaadhooga Jeheyne	"Asthaa Asthaa Asthaa"	Abdul Muhaimin	Ahmed Amir
2004	Mariyaadhu	"Nunidheyney Hithaa Mi Nukulheyshey"		Solo
2004	Saahil	"Hibakuramey"	Adam Haleem Adnan	Mumthaz Moosa
2004	Saahil	"Thihiyy Adhu"	Ahmed Nashid (Dharavandhoo)	Mukhthar Adam
2004	Vidhaathari	"Haadhahaavaa Ran'galhey"	Abdul Muhaimin	Ahmed Amir
2004	Vidhaathari	"Han'dhuvaruge Reethi Moosun Mee"	Abdul Muhaimin	Abdul Baaree
2004	Vidhaathari	"Saharoa Mee"	Abdul Muhaimin	Solo
2004	Vidhaathari	"Mirey Tharin"	Abdul Muhaimin	Ibrahim Amir
2004	Zamaan	"Vaudhaa Huvaakoh Buneemey"	Boi Ahmed Khaleel	Umar Zahir
2004	Ehan'dhaanugai...	"Loabivaa Ey Theyree"		Solo
2005	Fari Goma	"Neyngeyhey Heeleemaa"	Adam Haleem Adnan	Mohamed Huzam
2005	Fura Dhanvaru	"Loabi Nuvaa Hitheh Kobaahey"	Shareefa Fakhry	Ali Abdulla (Komandoo)
2005	Fura Dhanvaru	"Dheewaanaa Veemathaa"	Shareefa Fakhry	Muaviyath Anwar
2005	Yaaraa 2	"Rulhin Nuhurevenyaa"	Ahmed Nashid (Dharavandhoo)	Ibrahim Amir
2005	Zuvaanaa	"Han'dhakee Thee Hiyy Edhey"		Abdul Baaree
2006	Yaaraa 3	"Nikammaa Kiyaa"	Ahmed Nashid (Dharavandhoo)	Mohamed Zaid
2006	Hiyy Dheewaanaa 3	"I Am In Love"	Shareefa Fakhry	Ibrahim Amir
2006	Keehve..?	"Ran'galhey Alhe Enme Ran'galhey"	Adam Naseer Ibrahim	Abdul Baaree
2006	Jism	"Hiyy Buneyey Roalaashey"	Ahmed Nashid (Dharavandhoo)	Hassan Ilham
2006	Bichaanaa	"Aadhey Araamu Edhemey"	Adam Haleem Adnan	Solo
2006	Bichaanaa	"Dhaashey Yaaraa"	Adam Haleem Adnan	Mumthaz Moosa
2006	Mihithun	"Fazaage Roalhi Ais Beehilaa"		Ibrahim Nifar (Thihthi)
2006	Kisthee	"Dheveyhey Fenifaa Nubalaa Haal"	Adam Haleem Adnan	Solo
2006	Mihan'dhaanugai...	"Thiya Bunaa Roohee Ufaathah"	Aminath Hussain	Solo
2006	Loabiveriyaa	"Kalaa Thee Loaiybey Hithugaavaa"	Ahmed Sameer	Mohamed Ahmed (Dokey)
2007	Hithuga Vikaafa	"Khiyaal Khiyaal Kurevey Kurevey"	Mohamed Abdul Ghanee	Abdulla Waheed (Waddey)
2008	Hiyy Dheewaanaa 4	"Nuveythoa Ey Loabi"	Shareefa Fakhry	Hassan Ilham
2009	Yaaraa 4	"Huree Nazaru Dheyn"	Ahmed Nashid (Dharavandhoo)	Solo
2009	Adhives... Loabivey	"Furathama Nazaruga Hiyy Athulaa"		Solo
2009	Hiyy Dheebalaa 2	"Hiyy Dheyn Dhey"	Easa Shareef	Abdul Hannan Moosa Didi
2009	Fari Kamana	"Thi Farudhaa Nagaashey"	Ahmed Haleem	Solo
2009	Roalhi – Remix	"Bunebala Ladhuganefaa" (Remix Version)	Mausoom Shakir	Ali Rameez
2009	Roalhi – Remix	"Rey Nidheegaaves Dhusheemey" (Remix Version)	Mausoom Shakir	Ali Rameez
2009	Roalhi – Remix	"Ishaaraaiykoh Balaalaanee" (Remix Version)	Mausoom Shakir	Ali Rameez
2009	Roalhi – Remix	"Midhimaa Balaanuhey" (Remix Version)	Mausoom Shakir	Ali Rameez
2017	Single	"PC Is My Name"	Hassan Tholaaq	Hassan Tholaaq
2018	Mooney Thiee Hiyy Edhey	"Dhaneehe Aisbalaa" (Unplugged Version)	Abdulla Afeef	Umar Zahir
2018	Mooney Thiee Hiyy Edhey	"Mulhi Zindhagee Hithaamain" (Unplugged Version)		Umar Zahir
2018	Mooney Thiee Hiyy Edhey	"Vaathee Ma Kaireegaa" (Unplugged Version)	Fathimath Nahula	Umar Zahir
2018	Mooney Thiee Hiyy Edhey	"Mooney Thiee Hiyy Edhey" (Unplugged Version)	Mausoom Shakir	Umar Zahir
2018	Mooney Thiee Hiyy Edhey	"Dhin Han'dhaanee Masthee Reyrey" (Unplugged Version)	Hussain Rasheed	Umar Zahir
2018	Mooney Thiee Hiyy Edhey	"Bahaarekey" (Unplugged Version)		Umar Zahir
2020	Single	"Ilaahee Mibin" (Cover Version)	Abdul Rasheed Hussain	Various Artists

== Accolades ==
Year	Award	Category	Nominated work	Result	Ref(s)
2000	National Award of Recognition	Performing Arts - Singing		Won	
2007	3rd Gaumee Film Awards	Best Female Playback Singer	"Mihitha Loabi Dheynan" - Amaanaaiy	Won	
