= Dheriyaa =

1994 Maldivian film

- Official film poster
- Directed by: Mohamed Niyaz
- Written by: Mohamed Niyaz
- Screenplay by: Mohamed Niyaz
- Produced by: Abdul Muhaimin
- Starring: Ali Khalid; Hawwa Zahira; Koyya Hassan Manik; Arifa Ibrahim
- Cinematography: Mohamed Manik; Hassan Haleem
- Edited by: Mohamed Niyaz
- Music by: Ahmed Amir
- Production company: Club Scope
- Release date: November 4, 1994
- Running time: 195 minutes
- Country: Maldives
- Language: Dhivehi

Dheriyaa is a 1994 Maldivian romantic drama film directed by Mohamed Niyaz. Produced by Abdul Muhaimin under Club Scope, the film stars debutant Ali Khalid and his then wife, Hawwa Zahira in pivotal roles.

== Premise ==
Ashraf (Ali Khalid), a womaniser from a middle-class family, is smitten with a poster girl, Shan (Hawwa Zahira), and accepts his best friend Ibrey's (Ahmed Shimau) bet that he will start a romantic relationship with her. On the night of her final stage performance, Ashraf approaches her and a brief spark ignites between them, despite the fact that she is already engaged to an overprotective boyfriend, Iqbal (Ibrahim Waheed). They slowly bond and spend a month together, until Shan refuses to be intimate with him. Strong-willed, Ashraf is sure that Shan will soon return to him. Things go according to his plan as Shan comes begging for his love and submits to him, though he decides to break up with her once his desires are fulfilled.

Convinced by Ibrey and his mother, Dhon Kabulo (Arifa Ibrahim), Ashraf continues his relationship with Shan. Their affair is brought to the attention of Shan's parents, where her father, Solih (Koyya Hassan Manik), dismisses it as a false accusation until he witnesses them intimate together. Furious, he forbids her to leave and tries to bribe Ashraf to stay away from his family. Hesitantly, Solih agrees to the marriage, though he remains determined to disown Shan after the wedding.

== Cast ==
- Ali Khalid as Ashraf
- Hawwa Zahira as Shan
- Koyya Hassan Manik as Solih
- Arifa Ibrahim as Dhon Kabulo
- Hawwa Riyaza as Nadhiya
- Maryam Waheedha as Zahida
- Ibrahim Waheed as Iqbal
- Ahmed Shimau as Ibrey
- Reeko Moosa Manik as Nasif
- Ibrahim Rasheedh as Hashim
- Fathimath Rashfa as Maria
- Baby Aish as Aish
- Aishath Rasheedha as Liusha
- Maryam Hajara as Faraha
- Mohamed Hussain as Mahmood
- Waheeda as Fathuma
- Sadna as Fazla
- Ismail Imthiyaz as Zahir
- Khadeeja Moosa as Hidhaa
- J.Athula Siri as Rodrigo
- Mohamed Zahir as Waleed
- Aisth Hanim as Zuheyra
- Hassan Haleem as Kumar
- Zareena Ibrahim as Shameema

== Development ==
On announcing the film with a fresh face as a leading actor, the audience and the media was skeptical if director Mohamed Niyaz could deliver the required emotion and acting from the cast. Recalling his memory as a debutant in the film, Khalid called his character to a "challenging role" in which he initially had double thoughts for accepting a role of a negative character to make his first impression. During the filming, Khalid underwent minor injuries as a car accident stunt went wrong which led to the non-restrained car hitting him in real life.

== Soundtrack ==
Track listing
No.	Title	Lyrics	Music	Singer(s)	Length
1.	"Magey Shaanu"	Abdulla Sodhiq	Ibrahim Shiham	Mohamed Rashad, Fazeela Amir	4:40
2.	"Aadhey Miadhu Dhaan"	Abdulla Sodhiq	Ahmed Amir	Abdul Rasheed, Fazeela Amir	5:16
3.	"Foni Kaathakethi"	Abdulla Afeef	Ibrahim Shiham	Mohamed Rashad, Aminath Shihab	2:43
4.	"Magey Loabi Dharifulhaa"	Abdulla Sodhiq	Ibrahim Shiham	Fazeela Amir, Mohamed Rashad	7:35
5.	"Aavaa Adhu Khiyaalakee"	Abdul Muhaimin	Ibrahim Shiham	Fazeela Amir	3:44
6.	"Vakivee Asaraa"	Abdulla Sodhiq	Ahmed Amir	Fazeela Amir	5:25
7.	"Nume Keki Huregen"	Abdulla Sodhiq	Faidh Farooq	Ahmed Amir, Fazeela Amir	4:58

== Reception ==
Upon release, the film received positive reviews from critics where it was considered a "path-breaking" film for mainstream cinema. Praising the film and its production in 2015, Ahmed Nadheem from Avas wrote: "Under the helm of Tedry, in his directorial debut with newcomers as the main cast, Dheriyaa is a masterpiece and can still be considered relevant even after decades after its release". According to Nadheem, with this film, Niyaz has established him as the most accomplished director of the industry even though he is one film old.

The film was a box office success where it was recorded to be the first Maldivian film to cross MVR 200,000. Having screened a total of thirty two houseful shows at Olympus Cinema, the lifetime collection of the film was recorded at MVR 900,000 and held the record of highest grossing Maldivian film till the release of Fathimath Nahula's Yoosuf in 2008.

== Accolades ==
Year	Award	Category	Recipient(s) and nominee(s)	Result
1995	1st Gaumee Film Awards	Best film	Dheriyaa	Won
1995	1st Gaumee Film Awards	Best Director	Mohamed Niyaz	Won
1995	1st Gaumee Film Awards	Best Actor	Ali Khalid	Nominated
1995	1st Gaumee Film Awards	Best Actress	Hawwa Zahira	Won
1995	1st Gaumee Film Awards	Best Supporting Actress	Hawwa Riyaza	Nominated
1995	1st Gaumee Film Awards	Jury's Award	Fathimath Rashfa	Won
1995	1st Gaumee Film Awards	Best Editing	Mohamed Niyaz	Won
1995	1st Gaumee Film Awards	Best Cinematography	Mohamed Manik, Hassan Haleem	Won
1995	1st Gaumee Film Awards	Best Background Music	Ahmed Affaal, Ahmed Amir	Won
1995	1st Gaumee Film Awards	Best Setting	Abdul Muhaimin, Mohamed Niyaz	Won
1995	Aafathis Awards - 1994	Best Film	Dheriyaa	Won
1995	Aafathis Awards - 1994	Best Director	Mohamed Niyaz	Won
1995	Aafathis Awards - 1994	Best Actress	Hawwa Zahira	Won

== Sequel ==
In March 2021, Muhaimin announced that he intended to develop a sequel of Dheriyaa.
