= Rafiyath Rameeza =

Maldivian singer (born 1976)

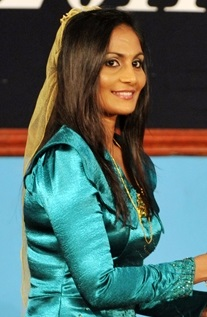
- Rameeza receiving the National Award of Recognition, 2011
- Born: 23 March 1976 (age 50); Male', Maldives
- Occupation: Playback singer
- Years active: 1994–present
- Spouse: Ibrahim Amir
- Children: 2
- Musical career
- Genres: Pop; filmi; electronic
- Instrument: Vocals

Rafiyath Rameeza (born 23 March 1976) is a Maldivian singer.

== Early life ==
Rafiyath Rameeza was born and raised in the "Rameez family" where several artists, including Ali Rameez and Ibrahim Rameez, were raised and became prominent in the music industry. At the age of 12, while studying at Aminiya School, she competed in the Television Maldives Interschool Singing Competition and continued to participate in the competition for several years. In 1993, at the age of seventeen, while studying at Malé English School, Rameeza performed the song "Kaakuhey Mithaahuree" in the competition which earned her the award for Best Performer in her age category and ranked second in the competition. The following year, she performed the song "Heylaa Hure Ey" which again resulted in her winning the first place in the age category and second place in overall from the competition. She credited old Bollywood classical songs for the training, vocal exercises, and techniques she learned in singing.

After completing her studies, Rameeza worked as a secretary at a law firm for eight years. While she was working at this job, Rameeza married one of her singing duet partners, Ibrahim Amir, the brother of two renowned singers, Ahmed Amir and Fazeela Amir. During this time she worked as a mentor for the young generation artists including: Aishath Maain Rasheed, Lahufa Faiz and Mira Mohamed Majid. After giving birth to her first child, Rameeza quits the job and started recording for albums and films as a hobby.

== Career ==
Upon release of her first recording, Rameeza received several offers from music directors and producers to sing for their films and albums. The song "Liyunu Sitee Ey", from the album Furaana (1998) was the breakthrough performance by Rameeza, where she carved a niche in the "slow romantic and high-pitched" genre. Rameeza believes she is more "confident" and her "voice suits better" in slow tracks rather than fast-paced songs, though she began experimenting with her "lower vocal range" later in the career.

2010 witnessed a "new rise" in Rameeza where she recorded for several films including Veeraana and Niuma while remaking some old classical songs like "Ey Zamaana" and "Saahibaa" for Dhin Veynuge Hithaamaigaa and "Hiyy Adhu Ronee Ey" for Heyonuvaane. The song "Aadhey Aadhey" from Zalzalaa En'buri Aun released during the same year fetched her a Gaumee Film Award nomination for Best Female Playback Singer. A sequel to her song of the same name from the film Zalzalaa (2000), "Aadhey Aadhey" was praised by the music critics for her "haunting" vocals. In 2011, the Government of Maldives honoured her with the National Award of Recognition, which Rameeza attributed as her biggest achievement. She is celebrated as one of the few singers who remains in the top of the industry since the 1990s.

Apart from singing, Rameeza made a brief appearance in the Ali Shifau-directed horror film Fathis Handhuvaruge Feshun 3D which serves as a prequel to Fathis Handhuvaru (1997), where she played the role Zoona, which was played by Niuma Mohamed in its sequel and was noted as a "surprising and unseen" side of Rameeza.

== In the media ==
In a publication from Haveeru Daily, Maisoon Moosa praised her "excellence in dominating the slow romantic song genre for over 25 years, despite the rise in new talents and styles" and commended her for "still remaining relevant in the industry while her contemporaries faded". In an interview from Avas, Ahmed Nadheem calling her the "Evergreen Queen of Maldives" noted that she has "a voice that does not deteriorate and a beauty that never fades with age". Apart from that, her "discipline" and "work ethics" were appraised in the media where she is always seen "wearing long sleeved" and "socially acceptable" dresses in public gatherings.

== Discography ==
=== Feature film ===
Year	Film	Song	Lyricist(s)	Co-artist(s)	Notes
1994	Kulunu	"Ruhumaa Kulunaa Loabivaa"		Muaviyath Anwar	
1997	Loabeega Aniyaa	"Edheynee Dhiyunhey Roalaafaa"		Solo	
1998	Ethoofaaneerey	"Eyru Dhinhaa Ufaa"	Ahmed Shakeeb	Abdul Hannan Moosa Didi	
1998	Sirru	"Jaadhoo Ekey Kalaa Hedhee"	Ahmed Sharumeel	Ibrahim Amir	
1999	Umurah	"Ey Loabidheyshey Mastheevi Reyrey"	Adam Haleem Adnan	Ali Rameez	
1999	Umurah	"Umurunve Maazee Qaruneh Dhiyas"	Adam Haleem Adnan	Ali Rameez	
2000	Zalzalaa	"Aadhey Aadhey"	Abdul Hannan Moosa Didi	Solo	
2001	Ranmuiy	"Gislumaa Veynugaa"	Abdul Muhaimin	Solo	
2001	Ranmuiy	"Jaadhooge Malikaa Fenumun Mirey"	Abdul Muhaimin	Ibrahim Amir	Appears in Soundtrack album
2004	Dharinnahtakai	"Insaaneke Mee Dhuniyeygaa"	Easa Shareef	Solo	
2004	Dharinnahtakai	"Athugaa Hifaa Dhin Ithubaarakun"	Ahmed Nashidh (Dharavandhoo)	Ibrahim Rameez	
2009	Loaiybahtakaa	"Hiyy Nagaafaa Ma Dhineemaa"	Adam Haleem Adnan	Abdul Baaree	
2009	Loaiybahtakaa	"Shaairekey Thee Beynunvey Khiyaal"		Abdul Baaree	Appears in Soundtrack album
2010	Maafeh Neiy	"Hanhaarain Hiyy Furidhey"	Mohamed Abdul Ghanee	Ibrahim Zaid Ali	
2010	Dhin Veynuge Hithaamaigaa	"Ey Zamaanaa"	Yoosuf Mohamedfulhu	Solo	
2010	Dhin Veynuge Hithaamaigaa	"Annaashey Hinithunvelamaa"	Mohamed Abdul Ghanee	Ibrahim Zaid Ali, Mohamed Abdul Ghanee, Ahmed Shabeen, Mariyam Ashfa, Aminath Shaufa Saeed	
2010	Dhin Veynuge Hithaamaigaa	"Dhoadhi Ran" (Version 1)	Mohamed Abdul Ghanee	Mumthaz Moosa	
2010	Dhin Veynuge Hithaamaigaa	"Saahibaa"	Hussain Sobah	Abdul Baaree	
2010	Dhin Veynuge Hithaamaigaa	"Dhoadhi Ran" (Version 2)	Mohamed Abdul Ghanee	Ibrahim Zaid Ali	Appears in Soundtrack album
2010	Zalzalaa En'buri Aun	"Aadhey Aadhey"	Mohamed Abdul Ghanee	Solo	
2010	Veeraana	"Veeraanaa Vefaavaa Hayaaiy"	Adam Haleem Adnan	Ibrahim Zaid Ali	
2010	Veeraana	"Veeraanaa" (Promotional Song)	Adam Haleem Adnan	Various	Appears in Soundtrack album
2010	Niuma	"Hithugaa An'dhaa Mi Alifaan"	Adam Haleem Adnan	Solo	
2010	Heyonuvaane	"Hiyy Adhu Ronee Ey Nudhaashey"	Hussain Shihab	Solo	
2010	Heyonuvaane	"Dhekefeemey Beevi Manzaru" (Slow Version)	Boi Ahmed Khaleel	Solo	
2011	Sazaa	"Sazaa" (Theme Song)	Mohamed Abdul Ghanee	Solo	
2011	Sazaa	"Sazaa" (Promotional Song)	Hussain Sobah	Ahmed Yaafiu	
2011	Hithey Dheymee	"Hithey Dheymee"	Yoosuf Mohamedfulhu	Mohamed Farhad	
2011	Hithey Dheymee	"Hithey Dheymee" (Sad Version)	Yoosuf Mohamedfulhu	Mohamed Farhad	
2011	Hithey Dheymee	"Vey Kalaa Furaanaigaa"	Mohamed Abdul Ghanee	Mohamed Farhad	
2011	Hithey Dheymee	"Saafu Nayaa Han'dhuvaru"	Mohamed Abdul Ghanee	Mumthaz Moosa	
2011	Hithey Dheymee	"Oagaave Bunamey"	Ahmed Nashidh (Dharavandhoo)	Hassan Ilham	Appears in Soundtrack album
2011	Zaharu	"Dhuniyeynvee Baakee" (Female Version)	Mohamed Abdul Ghanee	Solo	
2011	Zaharu	"Araamudheyshey"	Mohamed Abdul Ghanee	Ibrahim Zaid Ali	
2011	Zaharu	"Dhuniyeynvee Baakee" (Duet Version)	Mohamed Abdul Ghanee	Ibrahim Zaid Ali	
2011	E Bappa	"Ulhe Ulhe Gaimuvee"		Mumthaz Moosa	
2011	Laelaa	"Kuramey Rovey"		Solo	
2011	Hiyy Yaara Dheefa	"Thivee Beywafaa" (Version 1)	Mohamed Abdul Ghanee	Mumthaz Moosa	
2011	Insaaf	"Ranyaa"	Mohamed Abdul Ghanee	Mohamed Abdul Ghanee	
2011	Inthihaa	"Alhe Foohinumevanyaa Dhen"	Hussain Sobah	Hussain Sobah	Shelved film
2012	Mihashin Furaana Dhandhen	"Sihijjey Birun"	Mausoom Shakir	Humaidh	
2013	Dhilakani	"Dhilakani" (Promotional Song)	Ahmed Falah	Ahmed Yaafiu, Ibrahim Nifar (Thihthi)	
2014	Aniyaa	"Bunaashey Hithaa Ey"	Ismail Mubarik	Hassan Jalaal	
2014	Raanee	"Oagaave Bunamey"	Ahmed Nashidh (Dharavandhoo)	Hassan Ilham	
2015	Gilan	"Gilan" (Theme Song)	Hussain Sobah	Hussain Sobah	Shelved film
2016	E Re'ah Fahu	"Mi Dhulun Thiya Faraathah"		Hassan Ilham	
2016	Haadharu	"Naanaa"	Adam Naseer Ibrahim	Ahmed Athif	
2016	Vafaatheri Kehiveriya	"Vafaatheri Kehiveriyaa"	Adam Haleem Adhnan	Solo	
2016	Vee Beyvafa	"Mastheh Geney Hulhu Roavelan"	Mohamed Abdul Ghanee	Ibrahim Zaid Ali	
2017	Neydhen Vakivaakah	Mohamed Abdul Ghanee	"Mendhan Veemaa"	Mumthaz Moosa	
2017	Bos	"Mihiyy Edhey Goiy Nuvanee"	Mausoom Shakir	Hamoodh Ibrahim	
2023	Loabi Vevijje	"Heelumey Hiyy Furey" (Version 1)	Mohamed Abdul Ghanee	Aleef Ali	
2024	Kamanaa	"Kamanaa (Theme Song)"	Adam Haleem Adnan	Solo	
2024	Kamanaa	"Kathi Kathi Chaalu Balaalun"	Mohamed Abdul Ghanee	Mohamed Abdul Ghanee, Mariyam Ashfa	
2025	Kan'bulo	"Mi Libunu Sazaa Akee"	Mohamed Abdul Ghanee	Mohamed Abdul Ghanee	

=== Short films ===
Year	Title	Song	Lyricist(s)	Co-artist(s)	Notes
2009	Pink Fairy	"Pink Fairy"	Mohamed Abdul Ghanee	Solo	
2009	Pink Fairy	"Pink Fairy" (Remix Version)	Mohamed Abdul Ghanee	Solo	
2012	Dheke Dhekeves 6	"Hiyy Thelheyhey"	Adam Haleem Adnan	Hussain Sobah	

=== Television ===
Year	Title	Song	Lyricist(s)	Co-artist(s)	Notes
1994	Qurubaan	"Thasveeru Mithuraa Fenumun Mirey"	Fenthashi Mohamed Khaleel	Fenthashi Mohamed Khaleel	
1999	Liushaa (Teledrama)	"Saadhaa Mizaaju"	Boi Ahmed Khaleel	Ali Rameez	
2009	Mihithah Loabi Dheyshey	"Mihithah Loabi Dheyshey"	Adam Haleem Adnan	Ibrahim Zaid Ali	
2010	Mohommaa Gaadiyaa 2	"Ran Loabivaa"	Adam Haleem Adnan	Hassan Ilham	
2010	Mohommaa Gaadiyaa 2	"Ishqee Maabageechaa"	Ahmed Falah	Mumthaz Moosa	
2011	Furaana Dheynan	"Furaana Dheynan"		Mohamed Farhad	
2022	Dairy	"Thiee Hooreh"	Hussain Sobah	Hussain Sobah	Shelved series
2026	Ekaniveri Hithakun...	"Ekaniveri Hithakun" (Theme Song)	Ameen Ibrahim	Ali Abdulla	

=== Non-film songs ===
Year	Album/single	Song	Lyricist(s)	Co-artist(s)
1993	Inter-school Singing Competition '93	"Kaakuhey Mithaa Huree"		Solo
1993	Kresendo '93	"Ai Moosun Mi Nayaa"		Mohamed Shahid
1993	Kresendo '93	"Libey Dhirun Hithuge Baarey Thee"		Haamidh
1993	Kresendo '93 ge 2	"Angaa Javaabu Dheynuhey"		Solo
1993	Malaa Faiy	"Dhuniyeyge Hurihaa Araamaa"	Fenthashi Mohamed Khaleel	Fenthashi Mohamed Khaleel
1993	Malaa Faiy	"Ishqu Loabeege Maa"	Fenthashi Mohamed Khaleel	Fenthashi Mohamed Khaleel
1993	Malaa Faiy	"Iru Eyge Alikan" (Female Version)	Fenthashi Mohamed Khaleel	Solo
1994	Inter-school Singing Competition '94	"Heylaa Hureyey"		Solo
1994	Kresendo '94	"Haasil Kuraashe Dhaanee"		Mohamed Ahmed (Dokey)
1994	Kresendo '94	"Hiyvarakun Fahe Dhiri Ulheveyhey"		Mohamed Shahid
1994	Kresendo '94	"Thiya Khiyaalugaa Vanee Kaakuhey"		Abdulla Waheed (Waddey)
1994	Kasab	"Bunedhey Miee Molhu Ramzekey"	Fenthashi Mohamed Khaleel	Fenthashi Mohamed Khaleel
1994	Kasab	"Thasveeru Mithuraa Fenumun Mirey"	Fenthashi Mohamed Khaleel	Fenthashi Mohamed Khaleel
1994	Kresendo 3	"Mey Vanee Thadheh Vefaa"		Solo
1994	Addana	"Loabeege Hoonu Roohey"	Ahmed Sharumeel	Fenthashi Mohamed Khaleel
1994	Addana	"Dhin Thadhaa Veynakee Beywafaa"	Ahmed Sharumeel	Solo
1995	Kresendo '95	"Reethi Hinithun Dhakkaairu"		Abdulla Waheed (Waddey)
1995	Farimaa	"Maazeevi Reyrey"		Ahmed Rasheed (Hulhudheli)
1995	Hedheykuri - 2	"Vakivee Kalaage Sababun" (Duet Version)		Ahmed Naseer (Addu)
1995	Hedheykuri - 2	"Fenifaa Nooney Hiyy Dheewaanaa"		Ahmed Naseer (Addu)
1995	Hedheykuri - 2	"Vakivee Kalaage Sababun" (Female Version)		Solo
1995	Hedheykuri - 2	"Vey Han'dhaan"		Solo
1995	Hedheykuri - 2	"Dhathi Hiyyve Ehee Hoadhan"		Mohamed Shahuban
1996	Dhiwaanaa	"Dhusheethee Mi Dheyhun"	Mohamed Amir Ahmed	Solo
1996	Dhiwaanaa	"Heevaa Thi Gothakee Goaheh"	Mohamed Amir Ahmed	Solo
1996	Dhiwaanaa	"Loabeegaa Vaane Dhiwaana Vumey Mee"	Mohamed Amir Ahmed	Mohamed Shahuban
1996	Sahaaraa	"Vee Mirey Hiyy Magey"	Ahmed Sharumeel	Solo
1996	Sahaaraa	"Love Hama Love"	Fathimath Nahula	Muaviyath Anwar
1996	Maayoos	"Annaashey Loabeegaa Magey"	Ahmed Shakeeb	Solo
1996	Single	"Hin'ganvee Raasthaa"		Solo
1996	Fashuvi	"Jaaney Dhoovi Jaan"	Ahmed Sharumeel	Ibrahim Amir, Fazeela Amir, Ali Rameez
1996	Shakuvaa	"Loabeege Khiyaal Kollan"	Ahmed Shakeeb	Muaviyath Anwar
1996	Asurumaa	"Edheynee Dhiyunhey Roalaafaa"		Solo
1997	Mathaaran	"Thee Theeye Magey"	Afeefa Ahmed	Ali Rameez
1997	Sarindhaa	"Jaadhoo Ekey Kalaa Hedhee"	Ahmed Sharumeel	Ibrahim Amir
1997	Sarindhaa	"Libey Veynee Sazaa"	Ahmed Sharumeel	Solo
1997	Shabaab	"Eyru Dhinhaa Ufaa"	Ahmed Shakeeb	Abdul Hannan Moosa Didi
1997	Shabaab	"Ruhumugaa Kaakuhey Balaalanee"	Ahmed Shakeeb	Ibrahim Rameez
1997	Single	"Abadhu Dhen Ma Roanhey Vee"	Abdul Hannan Moosa Didi	Abdul Hannan Moosa Didi
1998	Furaana	"Liyunu Sitee Ey"	Ahmed Shakeeb	Solo
1998	Furaana	"Reethee Heeleemaa"	Ahmed Shakeeb	Ali Rameez
1998	Sahaaraa 2	"Mooneh Fenifaa Heeleemey"		Muaviyath Anwar
1998	Kalhirava	"Saadhaa Mizaaju"	Boi Ahmed Khaleel	Ali Rameez
1998	Kalhirava	"Faruvaadhee Rihumehvey"	Easa Shareef	Solo
1999	Malakaa	"Dhefuraana Ekuvefaavaa"	Easa Shareef	Ali Rameez
1999	Himeyn	"Eynaage Khabareh Neevifaa"	Easa Shareef	Solo
1999	Himeyn	"Fahun Beywafaavee"	Easa Shareef	Solo
1999	Himeyn	"Reethi Malah Ekuraa Ziyaaraiy"	Easa Shareef	Solo
1999	Himeyn	"Nufilaa Thadheh Zamaanvee"	Easa Shareef	Solo
1999	Himeyn	"Rahumu Neiy Dhuniyeyn"	Easa Shareef	Solo
1999	Himeyn	"Maunavee Aalamun"	Easa Shareef	Ali Rameez
1999	Himeyn	"Heydhavey Gadi Heydhavey"	Easa Shareef	Ali Rameez
1999	Himeyn	"Loabivan Thiya Khiyaalu Kuran"	Easa Shareef	Ali Rameez
1999	Himeyn	"Insaanaa Meedhoa"	Easa Shareef	Ibrahim Rameez
1999	Himeyn	"Moosun Alivejjey"	Easa Shareef	Ibrahim Amir
1999	Sameydhaan	"Saafu Thedhekey Kurin Loabivey"	Abdul Muhaimin	Solo
1999	Sameydhaan	"Loabeegaa Keiymadhu Kollaa"	Ahmed Sharumeel	Ibrahim Amir
2000	Single	"Milkuvefaa Vakivaashe Jehey"	Ahmed Sharumeel	Ibrahim Amir
2000	Fanvaiy	"Loabeege Hoonun"	Ahmed Sharumeel	Ahmed Amir
2000	Muraka	"Dhusheemey Maleh"	Adam Haleem Adnan	Ali Rameez
2000	Karuna	"Fenunee Haadha Beynunvaa"		Ali Rameez
2000	Karuna	"Vaudheh Mirey Vaanan"	Easa Shareef	Ali Rameez
2001	Haasil	"Dheyn Vaaneyey"		Abdul Baaree
2001	Haasil	"Bunedheyshey Dhulakun"		Mohamed Rashad
2001	Reyfanaa	"Mihithaamaigaa Nunidhey Rahum"		Ahmed Inaaz
2001	Randhi	"Mas Odi Mahun Lefeemaa"	Athiyaa Ibrahim	Solo
2002	Moahiru	"Fenumun Heeleemaa"	Ahmed Nashid (Dharavandhoo)	Solo
2002	Paruvaana	"Dhathi Khiyaalu Hithuge Hoonaa"	Easa Shareef	Ibrahim Rameez
2002	Paruvaana	"Dheynamey Jaanaai Roohaa"	Kaneeru Abdul Raheem	Abdul Baaree
2002	Leykokaa	"Dhusheemey Maleh"	Adam Haleem Adnan	Ali Rameez
2003	Fannaanun	"Ufaaveri Ekuveri Vetteh Mee"		Various Artists
2004	Vidhaathari	"Khiyaalugaa Dhey Reydhuvaa"	Abdul Muhaimin	Solo
2004	Vidhaathari	"Vaaney Ufaa"	Abdul Muhaimin	Mukhthar Adam
2004	Ehan'dhaanugai...	"Veynaa Hoonaa Dhey Zamaan"		Solo
2005	Ehan'dhaanugai...	"Gulshan Moosun Khareefu Dhin"		Solo
2006	Mihan'dhaanugai...	"Heevaaney Dhoa"		Solo
2007	Thihan'dhaanugai...	"Hithey Dheymee Furey Loabin"	Yoosuf Mohamedfulhu	Solo
2008	Jaadhuvee Nooru	"Keevve Mihithaa Yaaru Kulhenee"	Adam Haleem Adnan	Abdulla Waheed (Waddey)
2008	Kalaa Haadha Loaiybey	"I'm In Love"	Adam Haleem Adnan	Mohamed Farhad
2008	Maumoon 2008	"Qaumu Othee Maumoonaa Ekugaa"		Fathimath Zoona, Shaheedha Riffath
2008	Maumoon 2008	"Qaumee Zamaanee Thauleemee"		Fathimath Zoona
2008	Maumoon 2008	"Qaumee Maslahathah"		Hussain Sobah, Fathimath Zoona
2008	Maumoon 2008	"Vee Maumoon Hovan Hovan"		Hussain Sobah, Fathimath Zoona, Mohamed Farhad
2008	Thihan'dhaanugai Remix	"Hithuge Loabeege Nan"	Abdul Hannan Moosa Didi	Solo
2009	Ehan'dhaanugai Duet	"Naanaavee Seedhaa Loabi"		Ahmed Nabeel Mohamed
2009	Vaahan'dhaanakun	"Vaathee Hithaama Gilanugaa"		Solo
2009	Vaahan'dhaanakun	"Vaahan'dhaanakun Rovenee" (Group Version)	Mohamed Amir Ahmed	Various Artists
2010	Thin Fiya	"Mieeye Minivan"		Mohamed Fazeel
2010	Ehan'dhaanugai Remix	"Adhu Roohu Vanee"		Moosa Thoriq
2010	Vaahan'dhaanakun 2	"Munifoohi Thibaa Hurihaa"		Solo
2010	Vaahan'dhaanakun 2	"Loabi Loabin Asaru"	Mohamed Amir Ahmed	Mukhthar Adam
2010	Vaahan'dhaanakun 2	"Vaahan'dhaanakun Rovenee" (Group Version)	Mohamed Amir Ahmed	Various Artists
2010	Jaadhuvee Thari	"Edhemey Hiyy Loabin Dheyn"		Abdulla Waheed (Waddey)
2010	Jaadhuvee Thari	"Vaarey Therey"		Jadhulla Ismail
2010	Jaadhuvee Thari	"Abadhu Beynun Loabin"		Nasir Ibrahim (Maliku)
2011	Badhunaseebu Loabi	"Keiynuvaaney Yaaru Dhurugaa"	Hussain Inaaz	Mohamed Farhad
2011	Badhunaseebu Loabi	"Thiyey Edhey Loaiybakee"	Hussain Inaaz	Ibrahim Zaid Ali
2011	Ehan'dhaanugai Retro	"Chaandhu Nayaa Malun"		Ali Shujau
2011	Vasmeeru	"Thiya Loa Kuraa Ishaaraaiy"		Mumthaz Moosa
2011	Voice Of Maldives: S02	"Athuleethaa Ey Hiyy Mi Kalaa"		Solo
2011	Dhohokkobe Han'dhaanugai: Raaja Raanee	"Raaja Raanee Bageechaa"		Solo
2011	Single	"Haas Hithaamain"	Mohamed Abdul Ghanee	Mohamed Abdul Ghanee
2012	Ehan'dhaanugai 1433	"Finikan Mihithah"	Mohamed Abdul Ghanee	Ahmed Abdul Jaleel
2012	Ehan'dhaanugai 1433	"Ehan'dhaanuge Asaruthakey"	Mohamed Abdul Ghanee	Various Artists
2012	Hithuge Enme Funminun: S01	"Himeynvee Hayaathey"	Mohamed Abdul Ghanee	Balqish
2012	Hithuge Enme Funminun: S01	"Hiriyaa Haadhisaa"	Mohamed Abdul Ghanee	Solo
2012	Loabivumakee	"Thiyey Masthuge Bahaaraa Gulhey"	Ismail Shameem	Ahmed Nabeel Mohamed
2013	Qaumee Dhuvas 1434	"Akhlaaq"		Various Artists
2013	Hiyy Dheebalaa 3	"Loaiybeh Thinoon Nethey"	Ahmed Nashid (Dharavandhoo)	Hassan Ilham
2013	Hiyy Dheewaanaa 6	"Aadhey Hithaa"		Hassan Ilham
2013	Jaanaa	"Ekugaa Loabin Yaaru Ulhefaa"	Imaadh Ismail	Mohamed Farhad
2013	Hithuge Enme Funminun: S02	"Haqqakeebaa Haqqakeebaa"	Mohamed Abdul Ghanee	Ibrahim Zaid Ali
2013	MDP	"Leyn Favaathee"		Ibrahim Zaid Ali
2014	Shuja 2014	"Sujaa Ey Hovaanee"		Hussain Sobah
2014	Vaahan'dhaanakun 3	"Fazaa Ey Dhillenee"		Ahmed Yaafiu
2014	Vaahan'dhaanakun 3	"Vaahan'dhaanakun Rovenee" (Group Version)	Mohamed Amir Ahmed	Various Artists
2015	Single	"Beehilaa Mi Roalhi Bunedhey"	Anwar	Mohamed Farhad
2015	Gellunu Haaru	"Ihuge Han'dhaanaa"		Solo
2015	Gellunu Haaru	"Fun Loabivun Badhalu Veyhey"		Abdulla Nashif (Thaathi)
2015	Ran Han'dhaanugai: S01	"Vamey Fun Thi Khiyaal"		Solo
2015	Tharinge Rey 2015	"Feenaashe Jehunee"	Kopee Mohamed Rasheed	Solo
2015	Minivan 50	"Minivan 50" (Theme Song)	Adam Naseer Ibrahim	Various Artists
2015	Single	"Maamalun Gathaa Amunaa"		Solo
2015	Qaumee Dhuvas 1437	"Mi Safugaa Dhemihureeves"	Jaufar Abdul Rahuman	Various Artists
2015	Qaumee Dhuvas 1437	"Mi Qaumee Jihaadhaa"	Adam Shareef Umar	Solo
2015	Qaumee Dhuvas 1437	"Qaumee Bathalunnah"	Abdulla Saeed	Various Artists
2015	Qaumee Dhuvas 1437	"Al-Ghaazee Mohamed Thakurufaanul Auzam"	Adam Naseer Ibrahim	Various Artists
2016	Single	"Kalaa Dhen Midhuniyeyn"	Abdul Raheem Abdulla	Ibrahim Zaid Ali
2016	Minivan 51	"Dhonveleethoa Dhamaalee"		Solo
2016	Maldivian Idol: S01	"Vaudheh Mirey Vaanan"	Easa Shareef	Mohamed Ishan
2016	4426	"Huvaakohfaa Bunan Loabivey"	Mohamed Abdul Ghanee	Ahmed Ibrahim (Ammadey)
2017	ABU International Dance Festival 2017	"Dhan'duverikamaa Masverikan"	Raalhugan'du Hampu	Solo
2017	Heevaagi Kan'balun 2017	"Dhonveli"		Solo
2017	Maldivian Idol: S02	"Maunavee Aalamun"	Easa Shareef	Hamoodh Ibrahim
2017	Abdulla Hameedge Thaubeen Jalsaa	"Karunun Furey Dheloa"		Solo
2017	Ran Han'dhaanugai: S02	"Kihinehtha Vee"		Abdulla Faalih Adam
2017	Jumhooree 50	"Jumhooree 50 Mee"	Adam Naseer Ibrahim	Various Artists
2017	Qaumee Dhuvahuge Jalsaa	"Mi Dheenaai Qaumiyyathu"		Various Artists
2017	Qaumee Dhuvas 1439: Bahuruva	"Qaumee Nidhaa"	Adam Shareef Umar	Various Artists
2018	Single	"Mi Moosun Mi Han'dhuvaru"	Raziyya Hassan	Shalabee Ibrahim
2018	Mi Hithugaa	"Aadhey Kalaa Gaathah Magey"	Hussain Inaaz	Hussain Inaaz
2018	Han'dhakee Thee Hiyy Edhey	"Mendhan Veemaa"	Mohamed Abdul Ghanee	Mumthaz Moosa
2018	Han'dhakee Thee Hiyy Edhey	"Meygaavi Alikuri Noorakee"	Yoosuf Mohamedfulhu	Ibrahim Zaid Ali
2018	Han'dhakee Thee Hiyy Edhey	"Saahibaa"	Hussain Sobah	Abdul Baaree
2018	Han'dhakee Thee Hiyy Edhey	"Han'dhakee Thee Hiyy Edhey"		Abdul Baaree
2018	Dhivehi Fuluhunge 85th Anniversary	"Dhivehi Fuluhun"	Adam Abdul Rahuman	Various Artists
2018	Dhivehi Fuluhunge 85th Anniversary	"Dhivehi Anhen Fuluhun"		Various Artists
2018	Mooney Thiee Hiyy Edhey	"Loabeege Mi Aalamugaa" (Unplugged Version)	Ahmed Zahir	Umar Zahir
2018	Mooney Thiee Hiyy Edhey	"Ummeedhu Kuramun Ai Rey" (Unplugged Version)	Abdulla Sodhiq	Umar Zahir
2018	Mooney Thiee Hiyy Edhey	"Hiyy Nurovvaa" (Unplugged Version)	Ahmed Shakeeb	Umar Zahir
2018	Mooney Thiee Hiyy Edhey	"Mooney Thiee Hiyy Edhey" (Unplugged Version)	Mausoom Shakir	Umar Zahir
2018	Mooney Thiee Hiyy Edhey	"Ye Raatein Ye Mausam" (Unplugged Version)	Shailendra	Umar Zahir
2018	Saff Champions 2018	"Maruhabaa Dhivehi Qaumee Footboalha Team"	Abdulla Afeef	Various Artists
2018	Single	"Thi Ishqugaa Adhu Vee"	Ahmed Nashid (Dharavandhoo)	Mujuthaba
2018	Qaumee Dhuvas 1440: Bathalun	"Shaheedh Hussain Adamge Han'dhaanugai"	Adam Shareef Umar	Various Artists
2018	Qaumee Dhuvas 1440: Bathalun	"Qaumee Bathalunnah"	Abdulla Saeed	Various Artists
2019	Shujaa 2019	"Nan Ivunas Hithu Ley Hiley"		Solo
2019	Shujaa 2019	"Thaaeedhugaa Dhaairaa Adhu Othee"		Mumthaz Moosa
2019	Han'dhaan Kurahchey	"Eynaa"	Easa Shareef	Solo
2019	Qaumee Dhuvas 1441: Mintheege Hamahamakan	"Sihhee Dhaairaa Kurieruvumugaa"	Izza Ahmed Nizar	Mohamed Abdul Ghanee, Hassan Tholaaq
2019	Qaumee Dhuvas 1441: Mintheege Hamahamakan	"Ilmee Dhaairaa Kurieruvumugaa"		Various Artists
2020	Loabi Nulibunas	"Mihithugaa Thiya Vindhu Jahayey"		Ibrahim Zaid Ali
2020	Loabi Nulibunas	"Loabi Nulibunas"		Mohamed Abdul Ghanee
2020	Single	"Fazaaey Reethi Fini Mendhan"	Raziyya Hassan	Solo
2020	Covid-19	"Haqqu Thaureefaa Shukuru Husvaanehey"	Abdul Raheem Abdulla	Solo
2020	Single	"Ilaahee Mibin" (Cover Version)	Abdul Rasheed Hussain	Various Artists
2020	Single	"Mee Maeh"	Easa Shareef	Haamid Nishan
2020	Qaumee Dhuvas 1442	"Naseyhatheh"	Ameena Mufeed	Various Artists
2020	Qaumee Dhuvas 1442	"Qaumiyyathu"	Jaufar Abdul Rahuman	Various Artists
2021	Single	"Lolakah Ninjeh Naadhey" (Cover Version)	Easa Shareef	Shalabee Ibrahim
2021	Adhives Reethi 1442	"Vehey Vaarey Therein" (Cover Version)	Meynaa Hassaan	Solo
2021	Adhives Reethi 1442	"Aashiqaa Dhushumah Edhey" (Cover Version)	Ibrahim Mansoor (Hasrath)	Solo
2021	Adhives Reethi 1442	"Saharoa E Maafu Dheyshey" (Cover Version)	Ibrahim Mansoor (Hasrath)	Solo
2021	Adhives Reethi 1442	"Beynunveemaa Loabinney" (Cover Version)	Hussain Rasheed	Solo
2021	Adhives Reethi 1442	"Gendhaashe Vayaa Ey"		Solo
2021	Qaumee Dhuvas 1443	"Kan'dumatheege Qaaidhun"	Anwar Zahir	Hussain Ali
2022	Single	"Reyrey Dheewaanaa" (Cover Version)	Yoosuf Mohamedfulhu	Mohamed Fazeen
2023	Single	"Fenuney Hooreh Erey"	Mohamed Fazeen	Mohamed Fazeen
2023	Single	"Mirey Beehileemaa" (Cover Version)	Easa Shareef	Shalabee Ibrahim
2023	Single	"Raajaa Vi Loabeege Raanee"	Aminath Riznee (Ritz)	Mohamed Maisaan (Bokitos)
2023	Single	"Loabin Mihiyy Foruvadheynuhey"	Aishath Sharumeela Hassan	Mohamed Fazeen
2025	Araairu	"Mee Magey Raajjeyey"	Abdul Raheem Abdulla	Various Artists

=== Religious / Madhaha ===
Year	Album/single	Song	Lyricist(s)	Co-artist(s)
2007	Al Haqqu	"Maalikey Mi Naseebu Dhevvee"		Solo
2007	Al Haqqu	"Thiya Mausoomu Kihaa Thoahiru"	Easa Shareef	Solo
2010	Dhu'aa	"Dhu'aayah Negee Aiy"	Adam Haleem Adnan	Solo
2010	Dhu'aa	"Heylaashe Muslimunney"	Adam Haleem Adnan	Solo
2010	Dhu'aa	"Kathunney Ahaashey"	Adam Haleem Adnan	Solo
2017	PSM Madhaha Album 1439	"Barakaathaa Dhevvaashi Dharumayaa"		Solo
2017	Single	"Maruhabaa Saahibu Al' Sa'aadhaa"	Adam Naseer Ibrahim	Various Artists
2019	Aalam	"Dhuniye Mee Faalame Vaguthee"	Izzath Ahmed Nizar	Solo
2019	Aalam	"Libey Meeye Hin'dhukolhu"	Izzath Ahmed Nizar	Solo
2021	Single	"Enme Sharafuveriyaa"	Kaneeru Abdul Raheem	Aminath Raaya Ashraf
2026	Dhanmaru	"Keerithivi Rasoolaa"	Abdul Raheem Abdulla	Solo

== Filmography ==
Year	Title	Role	Notes	Ref(s)
2010	Dhin Veynuge Hithaamaigaa	Herself	Special appearance in the song "Annaashey Hinithun Velamaa"	
2010	Veeraana	Herself	Special appearance in the promotional song "Veeraana"	
2013	Fathis Handhuvaruge Feshun 3D	Zoona	Cameo appearance	

== Accolades ==
Year	Award	Category	Nominated work	Result	Ref(s)
1993	Interschool Singing Competition	Under 16 – Best Performer	"Kaakuhey Mithaahuree"	Won	
1993	Interschool Singing Competition	Best Performer of the competition	"Kaakuhey Mithaahuree"	2nd place	
1994	Interschool Singing Competition	Under 18 – Best Performer	"Heylaa Hure Ey"	Won	
1994	Interschool Singing Competition	Best Performer of the competition	"Heylaa Hure Ey"	2nd place	
2010	Maldives Video Music Awards	Best Duet Song	"Mihithah Loabi Dheyshey" – Mihithah Loabi Dheyshey	Won	
2011	2nd SunFM Awards	Most Entertaining Female Vocalist		Nominated	
2011	National Award of Recognition	Performing Arts – Singing		Won	
2014	3rd Maldives Film Awards	Best Female Playback Singer	"Dhilakani" – Dhilakani	Nominated	
2015	6th Gaumee Film Awards	Best Female Playback Singer	"Aadhey Aadhey" – Zalzalaa En'buri Aun	Nominated	
2016	7th Gaumee Film Awards	Best Female Playback Singer	"Beyvafaa" – Hiyy Yaara Dheefa	Nominated	
