= Ibrahim Amir =

Maldivian singer (born 1967)

- Born: 9 December 1967 (age 57); Male', Maldives
- Occupation: Playback singer
- Years active: 1993–2006
- Spouse: Rafiyath Rameeza
- Musical career
- Genres: Pop; filmi; electronic
- Instrument: Vocals

Ibrahim Amir (born 9 December 1967) is a Maldivian singer.

== Early life and career ==
Ibrahim Amir was born and raised in the "Amir family" where several artists including Ahmed Amir and Fazeela Amir were brought up and "ruled" the local music industry. His talent was first recognized with the album Hiyy Fahi (1993) followed by several other duets with his sister Fazeela Amir. His songs from the album Fashuvi and Sameydhaan were particularly praised by music critics. Throughout his career, Amir recorded maximum songs with Fazeela and was more involved with the studio albums than film songs. In 2006, Amir stopped singing for albums and films and chose to make his "life busy with family plans". Amir was nominated as the "Most Entertaining Male Vocalist". in the SunFM Awards 2010, an award ceremony launched by Sun Media Group to honour the most recognized personalities in different fields. After his retirement from the industry, few songs recorded for his previous studio albums were re-released including the song "Abadhume Fahathun" from the album Giritee (1999) which was later incorporated into the soundtrack album of Thiya Loaibaa Dhurah (2018). Amir married his co-singer Rafiyath Rameeza and they have two children.

== Discography ==
=== Feature film ===
Year	Film	Song	Lyricist(s)	Co-artist(s)
1993	Dhanmalhi	"Dhen Dhen Haamavaa"	Abdulla Afeef	Fazeela Amir
1998	Sirru	"Jaadhoo Ekey Kalaa Hedhee"	Ahmed Sharumeel	Rafiyath Rameeza
1998	Kuhveriya	"Loabivey Yaaru Loabivey"	Adam Haleem Adnan	Fazeela Amir
2000	Hiyy Halaaku	"Khabarudhaarey Zuvaanaa Ey"	Ahmed Sharumeel	Fazeela Amir
2000	Hiyy Halaaku	"Vevunee Gayaa"	Ahmed Sharumeel	Fazeela Amir
2001	Aaah	"Vee Dhuruga Thibenhey?"	Easa Shareef	Fazeela Amir
2001	Ranmuiy	"Oh My God!"	Abdul Muhaimin	Fazeela Amir
2001	Ranmuiy	"Bahdhaluvumun Vejje Dheewana"	Easa Shareef	Fazeela Amir
2018	Thiya Loaibaa Dhurah	"Abadhume Fahathun"	Boi Ahmed Khaleel	Fazeela Amir

=== Non-film songs ===
Year	Album/single	Song	Lyricist(s)	Co-artist(s)
N/A	N/A	"Loabivey Yaaru Loabivey"	Adam Haleem Adnan	Fazeela Amir
N/A	N/A	"Yaaraa Mirey"		Fazeela Amir
N/A	Hulhevi Han'dhu	"Noolhebalaa Kuruvaafa Dheewaanaa"		Solo
1993	Hiyyfahi	"Dhaneehe Aisbalaa"	Abdulla Afeef	Fazeela Amir
1993	Hiyyfahi	"Dhen Dhen Haamavaa"	Abdulla Afeef	Fazeela Amir
1995	Hiyyfahi 2	"Zum Zum Zum"		Fazeela Amir
1995	Hiyyfahi 2	"Dheegen Thihen Nazaru"		Fazeela Amir
1995	Hiyyfahi 2	"Kiyaadhevidhaanehey"	Abdulla Afeef	Fazeela Amir
1996	Fashuvi	"Leykarunun Dheewaanaa Dhen"	Ahmed Sharumeel	Fazeela Amir
1996	Fashuvi	"Thiki Thiki Thih Vehemun Aadhey"	Ahmed Sharumeel	Fazeela Amir
1996	Fashuvi	"Mee Bala Husband"	Ahmed Sharumeel	Fazeela Amir
1996	Fashuvi	"Fenilee Gothun Thedhey"	Ahmed Sharumeel	Shifa Thaufeeq
1996	Fashuvi	"Jaaney Dhoove Jaan"	Ahmed Sharumeel	Rafiyath Rameeza, Ali Rameez, Fazeela Amir
1997	Mathaaran	"Gandhemey Chaalu Han'dhey Thee"		Fazeela Amir
1997	Mathaaran	"Annaanenyaa Dhaan Hin'gaa"		Solo
1997	Raahi	"Hithaavey Mi Bunanee"	Kopee Mohamed Rasheedh	Zuhura Waheedh
1997	Sarindhaa	"Jaadhoo Ekey Kalaa Hedhee"	Ahmed Sharumeel	Rafiyath Rameeza
1997	Sarindhaa	"Kollan Kollaa Khiyaal Kureemey"	Ahmed Sharumeel	Fazeela Amir
1997	Sarindhaa	"Hoonuvanee Jismaa Mey"	Easa Shareef	Solo
1998	Kurikeela	"Hoadhenee Hoadhenee"	Kopee Mohamed Rasheedh	Solo
1998	Meeraa	"Moonaa Moonu Kairiveemaa"	Kopee Mohamed Rasheedh	Fazeela Amir
1998	Meeraa	"Titanic Balan Hiyy Edhey"	Kopee Mohamed Rasheedh	Fazeela Amir
1998	Meeraa	"Mihiree Mihiree"	Kopee Mohamed Rasheedh	Shifa Thaufeeq
1998	Thaureef	"Merifaavi Dheloa"	Boi Ahmed Khaleel	Solo
1999	Adhaarasam	"Haalu Bunedhenhey Ma"		Shifa Thaufeeq
1999	Adhaarasam	"Hinithunve Dhurun Feni Annaathee"		Fazeela Amir
1999	Giritee	"Abadhume Fahathun"	Boi Ahmed Khaleel	Fazeela Amir
1999	Giritee	"O Reema"		Fazeela Amir
1999	Himeyn	"Moosun Alivejjey"	Easa Shareef	Rafiyath Rameeza
1999	Mahinoor	"Han'dhuvaru Therey"	Kopee Mohamed Rasheedh	Fazeela Amir
2000	Gumree	"Aawaaraavey Fenigen"		Fathimath Rauf
2000	Inthihaa	"Yaaraa Dhanyaa Molhivaaneyey"		Solo
2000	Khareef	"Vee Dhuruga Thibenhey?"	Easa Shareef	Fazeela Amir
2000	Moosum	"Vevunee Gayaa"	Ahmed Sharumeel	Fazeela Amir
2000	Moosum	"Khabarudhaarey Zuvaanaa"	Ahmed Sharumeel	Fazeela Amir
2000	Sahaaraa 2	"Alhe Dheewaanaa"		Solo
2000	Sameydhaan	"Thiya Fari Mooney Mee Jaadhoohey"	Ahmed Sharumeel	Solo
2000	Sameydhaan	"Ladhun Filee Nivaavelee"	Ahmed Sharumeel	Solo
2000	Sameydhaan	"Dhanvaru Mirey"	Ahmed Sharumeel	Solo
2000	Sameydhaan	"Loabeegaa Keiymadhu Kollaa"	Ahmed Sharumeel	Rafiyath Rameeza
2000	Sameydhaan	"Kehidheynamey"	Ahmed Sharumeel	Fazeela Amir
2000	Sameydhaan	"Yaaraa Hoadhan Noolhe Huriyyaa"	Ahmed Sharumeel	Fazeela Amir
2000	Sameydhaan	"Inthihaa Loabivey"	Ahmed Sharumeel	Fazeela Amir
2000	Sameydhaan	"Ehee Vedheynee Kaakuhey?"	Ahmed Sharumeel	Fazeela Amir
2001	Ranfaunu	"Hithaa Beynunvi Gothaa"		Fazeela Amir
2001	Ranfaunu	"Thiya Loabi Han'dhaanveemaa Ey"	Ahmed Sharumeel	Fazeela Amir
2001	Ranmuiy	"Jaadhooge Malikaa"	Abdul Muhaimin	Rafiyath Rameeza
2001	Ranmuiy	"Oh My God!"	Abdul Muhaimin	Fazeela Amir
2001	Ranmuiy	"Bahdhal Vumun Vejjey Dheewaanaa"	Easa Shareef	Fazeela Amir
2001	Rukkuri 2	"Loa Numaraa"	Easa Shareef	Fazeela Amir
2001	Single	"Milkuvefaa Vakivaashe Jehey"	Ahmed Sharumeel	Rafiyath Rameeza
2003	Billoori	"Hiyy Dhen Ei Bala Billoorihey?"		Fathimath Zoona
2004	Jaadhooga Jeheyne	"Jaanu Dheyn Beynumey"	Adam Haleem Adnan	Fazeela Amir
2004	Yaaraa 1	"Hithaa Meygaa Mihaaru"	Easa Shareef	Fazeela Amir
2005	Vidhaathari	"Mirey Tharin"	Abdul Muhaimin	Fazeela Amir
2005	Yaaraa 2	"Rulhin Nuhurevenyaa"	Ahmed Nashidh (Dharavandhoo)	Fazeela Amir
2006	Hiyy Dheewaanaa 3	"I Am In Love"	Shareefa Fakhry	Fazeela Amir
2006	Hureemey Inthizaarugai...	"Moosun Genesdhey Nayaa"	Easa Shareef	Fazeela Amir
