= Ahmed Amir =

Maldivian singer and music composer (born 1972)

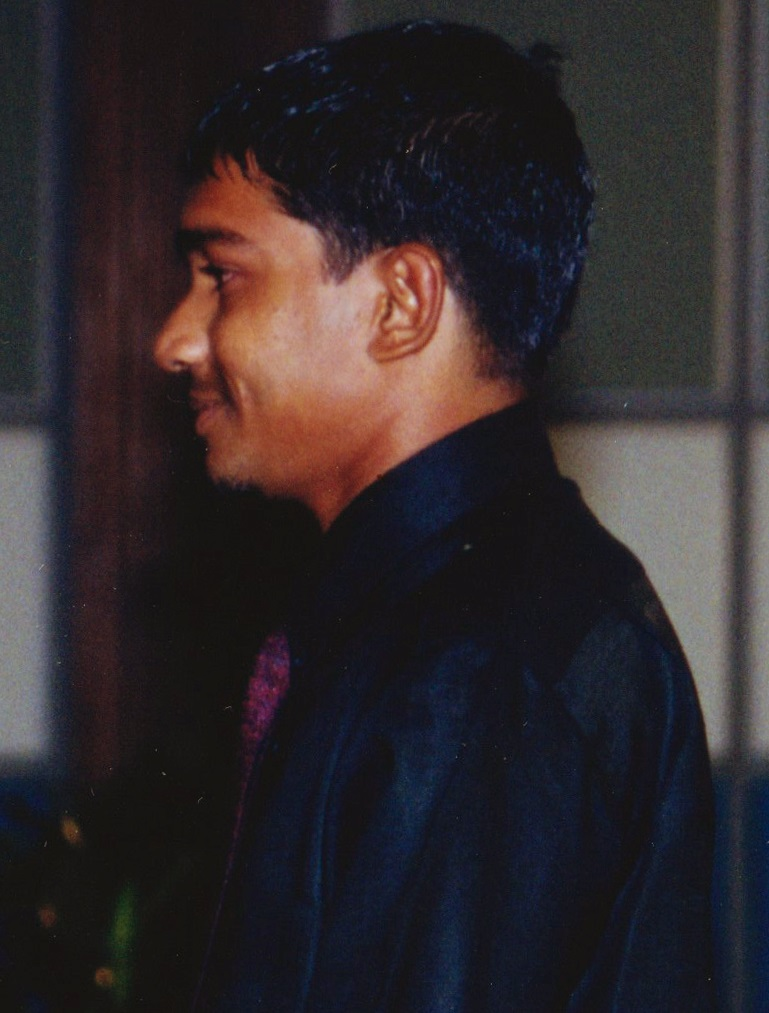
- Amir receiving the National Award of Recognition, 2000
- Born: 18 February 1972 (age 54); Male', Maldives
- Occupations: Singer; Music composer
- Years active: 1983–present
- Spouse: Aminath Namza
- Musical career
- Genres: Pop, Disco, Slow Rock
- Instruments: Vocals, Guitar, Kazoo

Ahmed Amir (born 18 February 1972) is a Maldivian singer and music composer.

== Early life and career ==
Ahmed Amir was born and raised in the "Amir family" which also includes Ibrahim Amir and Fazeela Amir. Ahmed Amir's very first appearance in as a music artist was at the age of 11 years, in 1983. He performed as a member of the 'Pluto Band' as a vocalist and guitarist. Together with Ahmed Amir, the now well known Maldivian singer Abdul Sameeu had also performed as a member of this Pluto Band.

In 1993, Amir formed "Maars Studio", which contributed to the music industry in programming music tracks, composing original music and in recording songs. Apart from guiding and training the students on singing techniques, he had also composed music tracks for students who performed in the Interschool Singing Competition. In 1995, Amir was awarded Gaumee Film Award for Best Background Music for his work in Dheriyaa. His very own music album Fanvaiy released in 2000 consisted of seven original melodies. It was in the year 2000 that Ahmed Amir was awarded Maldivian National Award of Recognition. Ahmed Amir has recorded many songs with his sister Fazeela Amir and was actively involved in music composing and song recordings done in studios for various Dhivehi Song Albums released till 2010.

== Discography ==
=== Feature film ===
| Year | Film | Song | Lyricist(s) | Co-artist(s) | Notes |
|---|---|---|---|---|---|
| 1994 | Dheriyaa | "Numekeki Huregen" | Abdulla Sodhiq | Fazeela Amir | |
| 1997 | Laila | "Moonaa Lolun" | Fathimath Nahula | Solo | Appears in Soundtrack album |
| 2000 | Hiyy Halaaku | "Thiya Loabi Han'dhaanveemaa Ey" | Ahmed Sharumeel | Fazeela Amir | |
| 2000 | Hiyy Halaaku | "Shaamilvee Hithugaa Ey" | Ahmed Sharumeel | Fazeela Amir | |
| 2000 | Hiyy Halaaku | "Farudhaa Nagaa Ellaalaashey" | Ahmed Sharumeel | Fazeela Amir | |
| 2000 | Majubooru Loabi | "Vai Gadhavaan Fesheethaa Ey" | | Fazeela Amir | |
| 2001 | Ranmuiy | "An'dhuneh Alhuvaa" | Abdul Muhaimin | Fazeela Amir | |
| 2001 | Ranmuiy | "Mee E Vaguthey Abadhu Faaralaa" | Abdul Muhaimin | Solo | Appears in Soundtrack album |
| 2002 | 30 Dhuvas | "Fahu Huvafen" | Aminath Moosa | Fazeela Amir | |
| 2002 | 30 Dhuvas | "Osseynee Iru" | | Solo | |
| 2002 | 30 Dhuvas | "Kan'du Roadhi" | | Solo | Appears in Soundtrack album |
| 2002 | 30 Dhuvas | "Neyngey" | | Solo | Appears in Soundtrack album |
| 2003 | Edhi Edhi Hoadheemey | "Edhi Edhi" (Theme) | Kopee Mohamed Rasheed | Solo | |

=== Television ===
| Year | Title | Song | Lyricist(s) | Co-artist(s) | Notes |
|---|---|---|---|---|---|
| 2000 | Reysham | "Reysham" | Jaufar Abdul Rahuman | Lalit | |
| 2003 | Edhuvas En'buri Annaanenama | "Mihiree Rakivefa" | Mausoom Shakir | Fathimath Zoona, Ahmed Nabeel Mohamed | |
| 2018 | Shakuvaa Akaa Nulaa | "Mi Dhekey Huvafen" | Boi Ahmed Khaleel | Fazeela Amir | |

=== Non-film songs ===
| Year | Album/Single | Song | Lyricist(s) | Co-artist(s) |
|---|---|---|---|---|
| 1996 | Fiyavahi | "Heeleemaahey Yaaraa Dhanee" | | Fazeela Amir |
| 1996 | Fashuvi | "Magey Yaarakee" | Afeefa Ahmed | Solo |
| 1996 | Fashuvi | "Reyrey Thedhey Loabin Kalaa" | Afeefa Ahmed | Fazeela Amir |
| 1996 | Fashuvi | "Hiyy Edheyney Yaaru Fenilaashey" | Ahmed Sharumeel | Fazeela Amir |
| 1996 | Misraab | "Hiyy Dhen Kuree Kon Kushehhey" | Easa Shareef | Solo |
| 1996 | Misraab | "Hiyy Dhen Kuree Kon Kushehhey" (Remix Version) | Easa Shareef | Fazeela Amir |
| 1997 | Kurunees | "Furaana Dheyshey" | | Fazeela Amir |
| 1997 | Thasveeru | "Moonaa Lolun" (Bonus Song) | Fathimath Nahula | Solo |
| 1999 | Dhirun | "Khiyaalu Kuraahaa Varuthaa" | Ahmed Haleem | Fazeela Amir |
| 1999 | Dhirun | "Fenilaa Gothun" | | Solo |
| 1999 | Giritee | "Vaathee Han'dhaanugaa" | | Fazeela Amir |
| 1999 | Kasthoori | "Ali Han'dhufadha Chaalu" | | Solo |
| 1999 | Ishq | "Fun Loabinney Eynaa" | | Fazeela Amir |
| 1999 | Ishq | "Aashoakhu Vefaavee Loabin" | | Solo |
| 1999 | Sameydhaan | "Hithuge Hithuge Vindhun" | Adam Haleem Adnan | Fazeela Amir |
| 1999 | Sameydhaan | "Fennaathee Balanyaa Loabin" | Ahmed Sharumeel | Fazeela Amir |
| 2000 | Fanvaiy | "Yaaraa Aimaa" | Ahmed Sharumeel | Fazeela Amir |
| 2000 | Fanvaiy | "Beynunvanee Yaaraa" | Ahmed Sharumeel | Fazeela Amir |
| 2000 | Fanvaiy | "Loabeege Hoonun" | Ahmed Sharumeel | Rafiyath Rameeza |
| 2000 | Fanvaiy | "Thee Neyvaa Ey Magey" | Ahmed Sharumeel | Solo |
| 2000 | Fanvaiy | "Libeythoa Yaaraa Huriyyaa" | | Solo |
| 2000 | Fanvaiy | "Tharithakaa Boa Vilaa" | | Solo |
| 2000 | Fanvaiy | "Fanvaiy" | | Solo |
| 2000 | Fanvaiy | "Fanvaiy" (Remix Version) | | Solo |
| 2000 | Fanvaiy | "Reysham" | Jaufar Abdul Rahuman | Lalit |
| 2000 | Inthihaa | "Fari Fari Nala Harakaaiy" | | Fazeela Amir |
| 2000 | Moosum | "Shaamilvee Hithugaa Ey" | Ahmed Sharumeel | Fazeela Amir |
| 2000 | Moosum | "Malakaa Magey Annaaneyhey" | Ahmed Sharumeel | Fazeela Amir |
| 2000 | Esfiya | "Vaigadhavaan Fesheethaa Ey" | | Fazeela Amir |
| 2000 | Esfiya | "Mi Dhekey Huvafen" | Boi Ahmed Khaleel | Fazeela Amir |
| 2000 | Laat | "Meeyey Kuraa Khiyaal Fikuru" | Abdulla Afeef | Fazeela Amir |
| 2000 | Laat | "Mi Dhehiyy Alakun Nugulheyney" | Abdulla Afeef | Solo |
| 2000 | Rasrana | "Heelaashe Kiyaidhemey" | Adam Haleem Adnan | Fazeela Amir |
| 2000 | Fun Loabi | "Yaaraa Fikuraavey" | Ahmed Sharumeel | Fazeela Amir |
| 2000 | Fun Loabi | "Dheyhugaa Vaa Ufaa" | | Fazeela Amir |
| 2000 | Fun Loabi | "Roashan Mooney Thee Roashan" | | Fazeela Amir |
| 2000 | Fun Loabi | "Ey Goyyey Dhaneehey" | | Fazeela Amir |
| 2000 | Fun Loabi | "Hoadheyey Nala Reethi Raanee" | | Fazeela Amir |
| 2000 | Fun Loabi | "Kurihaa Huvaa Vaudhaa Mithaa" | | Solo |
| 2000 | Fun Loabi | "Dhilaasaa Vee Chaalu Gomaa" | | Solo |
| 2001 | Ranfaunu | "Thiya Loabi Han'dhaanveemaa Ey" | Ahmed Sharumeel | Fazeela Amir |
| 2001 | Randhi | "Dhivehin Kuraa Masverikamey" | Abdul Muhaimin | Fazeela Amir |
| 2002 | Dhanvaru | "Jaadhoogaa Loabeege Jaadhoo" | Ahmed Haleem | Fazeela Amir |
| 2002 | Vadhaau | "Thee Fari Gomaa" | Ahmed Nashid (Dharavandhoo) | Solo |
| 2003 | Billoori | "Mihiree Rakivefa" | Mausoom Shakir | Fathimath Zoona, Ahmed Nabeel Mohamed |
| 2003 | Dhurugaa Viyas | "Foolhudhigu Handi" | | Andhala Haleem |
| 2003 | Single | "Boamathin Thiya Paree" | | Solo |
| 2004 | Ihusaas | "Hiyy Thalhuvan Dhen Noolhey" | Easa Shareef | Fathimath Zoona |
| 2004 | Jaadhooga Jeheyne | "Asthaa Asthaa Asthaa" | Abdul Muhaimin | Fazeela Amir |
| 2004 | Vidhaathari | "Haadhahaavaa Ran'galhey" | Abdul Muhaimin | Fazeela Amir |
| 2004 | Vidhaathari | "Loabeegaa Jehifaa Paruwaanaa" | Abdul Muhaimin | Fathimath Zoona |
| 2004 | Vidhaathari | "Ran Reethi Nikan Hoonu" | Abdul Muhaimin | Aishath Inaya |
| 2009 | Single | "Beynunviyas Vaakah Nethey" | | Hiyani Band |
| 2009 | Ehan'dhaanugai Duet | "Balamun Midhaa Sofuhaathakun" | Mohamed Musthafa Hussain | Aminath Shaufa Saeed |
| 2010 | Ehan'dhaanugai Remix | "Aa Raagu Reethihaa Ivvaidhey" | | Aishath Aalaa Abdul Hannan |
| 2010 | Thin Fiya | "Aadhey Aadhey" | | Lahufa Faiz |
| 2011 | Tharinge Rey 2011 | "Hiyy Beynumey" | Ahmed Falah | Niuma Mohamed |
| 2012 | Ekkala Golaa | "Annaashey" | | Mohamed Fazeel |
| 2012 | Ekkala Golaa | "Ekkala Golayah" | | Solo |
| 2013 | Single | "Rihi Han'dhuvaru" | | Solo |
| 2013 | Single | "Hiyy Hithaa" | | Ahmed Ishan (Ansi) |
| 2013 | Single | "Aadhey Miadhu Dhaan" | Abdulla Sodhiq | Solo |
| 2014 | Single | "Loabi Vevijjey" | Aminath Namza | Solo |
| 2016 | Single | "Aashiqaa" | | Solo |
| 2018 | Single | "Ehee Dhee" | Aminath Namza | Solo |
| 2018 | Single | "Kurehumun Faruvaa" | | Solo |
| 2020 | Single | "Ilaahee Mibin" (Cover Version) | Abdul Rasheed Hussain | Various Artists |
| 2020 | Single | "Vakivaathee" (Acoustic Version) | | Solo |
| 2020 | Single | "Fennaathee Balanyaa" (Reprise Version) | Ahmed Sharumeel | Aminath Saina |
| 2020 | Children's Day 2020 | "Gulhigen Ulhemaa" | | Aminath Saina, Ahmed Ishan (Ansi) |
| 2021 | Single | "Beynumeh Nuvey Thi Noon Loaiybeh" (Acoustic Version) | Aminath Namza | Solo |
| 2021 | Single | "Kuraashey Ma'aaf" (Acoustic Version) | | Solo |
| 2021 | Ihusaas (TV Show) | "Ihusaas" | | Solo |
| 2025 | Single | "Ufaaveri Raajje" | Mohamed Shameem | Aishath Zaya |

== Accolades ==
| Year | Award | Category | Nominated work | Result | Ref(s) |
|---|---|---|---|---|---|
| 1995 | 1st Gaumee Film Awards | Best Background Music | Dheriyaa (Shared with Ahmed Affaal) | Won | |
| 2000 | National Award of Recognition | Performing Arts - Music composition | | Won | |
