= Yom Kippur War =

1973 war between Israel and Arab states

- Part of the Arab–Israeli conflict and the Cold War
- A map of the final frontlines after the ceasefire took place
Date	6–25 October 1973 (2 weeks and 5 days)
Location	Golan Heights, Sinai Peninsula, Suez Canal (both banks) and surrounding regions
Result	See § Aftermath
Territorial changes	At the final ceasefire: Egyptian forces held 1,200 km^{2} (460 sq mi) on the eastern bank of the canal.; Israeli forces held 1,600 km^{2} (620 sq mi) on the western bank of the canal.; Israeli forces held 500 km^{2} (193 sq mi) of the Syrian Bashan region of the Golan Heights.

Belligerents
Egypt; Syria; Expeditionary forces Saudi Arabia Algeria Jordan Libya Iraq Kuwait Tunisia Morocco Cuba North Korea (Palestine) PLO factions (in Lebanon)	Israel

Commanders and leaders
(Egypt) Anwar Sadat; (Egypt) Ahmad Ismail Ali; (Egypt) Saad el-Shazly; (Egypt) Abdel el-Gamasy; (Egypt) Hosni Mubarak; (Egypt) Fouad Abou Zikry; (Ba'athist Syria) Hafez al-Assad; (Ba'athist Syria) Mustafa Tlass; (Ba'athist Syria) Yusuf Shakkur; (Ba'athist Syria) Naji Jamil; (Ba'athist Syria) Fadal Hussein	(Israel) Golda Meir; (Israel) Moshe Dayan; (Israel) David Elazar; Israel Tal; (Israel) Shmuel Gonen; (Israel) Yitzhak Hofi; (Israel) Eli Zeira; (Israel) Binyamin Peled; (Israel) Benjamin Telem; (Israel) Haim Bar-Lev; (Israel) Albert Mandler †; (Israel) Ariel Sharon

Strength
Egypt 650,000–850,000 troops (100,000+ crossed) 1,700 tanks (1,020 crossed) 2,400 armored carriers 1,120 artillery units (Note: The number reflects artillery units of caliber 100 mm and up) 400 combat aircraft 140 helicopters 104 naval vessels 150 surface-to-air missile batteries (62 in the front line) Syria 150,000–300,000 troops 1,200 tanks 800–900 armored carriers 600 artillery units Expeditionary forces 120,000 troops 500–670 tanks 700 armored carriers Saudi Arabia 23,000 troops (3,000 crossed) Morocco 5,500 troops 30 tanks provided by Syria Cuba 500–1,000 troops Total 914,000–1,067,500 troops 3,430–3,600 tanks 3,900–4,000 armored carriers 1,720 artillery units 452 combat aircraft 140 helicopters 104 naval vessels 150 surface-to-air missile batteries	375,000–415,000 troops; 1,700 tanks; 3,000 armored carriers; 945 artillery units; 440 combat aircraft

Casualties and losses
Egypt 5,000–15,000 dead 8,372 captured Syria 3,000–3,500 dead 392 captured Morocco 6 dead 6 captured Iraq 278 dead 898 wounded 13 captured Cuba 180 dead 250 wounded Jordan 23 dead 77 wounded Kuwait 18 dead Total 8,000–18,500 dead 18,000–35,000 wounded 8,783 captured 2,250–2,300 tanks destroyed 341–514 aircraft destroyed 19 naval vessels sunk	2,521–2,800 dead; 7,250–8,800 wounded; 293 captured; 400–800 tanks destroyed, 600 damaged or captured; 407 armored vehicles destroyed or captured; 102–387 aircraft destroyed

The Yom Kippur War, (Note: Hebrew: מלחמת יום הכיפורים, romanized: Milẖemet Yom HaKipurim, or Hebrew: מלחמת יום כיפור, romanized: Milẖemet Yom Kipur) also known as the 1973 Arab–Israeli War, the fourth Arab–Israeli War, the October War, (Note: Arabic: حرب أكتوبر, romanized: Ḥarb ʾUktōbar or Arabic: حرب تشرين, romanized: Ḥarb Tišrīn) or the Ramadan War (Note: Arabic: حرب رمضان, romanized: Ḥarb Ramaḍān) (6–25 October 1973), was fought between Israel and a coalition of Arab states led by Egypt and Syria. Most of the fighting occurred in the Sinai Peninsula and the Golan Heights, territories occupied by Israel in 1967. Some combat also took place in mainland Egypt and northern Israel.

The war started on 6 October 1973, when the Arab coalition launched a surprise attack across their respective frontiers during the Jewish holy day of Yom Kippur, which coincided with the 10th day of Ramadan. The United States and Soviet Union engaged in massive resupply efforts for their allies (Israel and the Arab states, respectively), which heightened tensions between the two superpowers.

Egyptian and Syrian forces crossed their respective ceasefire lines with Israel, advancing into the Sinai and the Golan Heights. Egyptian forces crossed the Suez Canal in Operation Badr, establishing positions, while Syrian forces gained territory in the Golan Heights. After three days, Israel halted the Egyptian advance and pushed most of the Syrians back to the Purple Line. Israel then launched a counteroffensive into Syria, shelling the outskirts of Damascus. The Egyptian forces continued the advance into Sinai on 14 October to relieve the Syrian front which was coming under increasing pressure.

Israeli forces exploited the failed Egyptian advance to breach the Suez Canal, advancing north toward Ismailia and south toward Suez to sever the Egyptian Second and Third Armies, with some units pushing west. However, their advance met fierce resistance on all fronts. Both sides accepted a UN-brokered ceasefire on 22 October, though it collapsed the day after amid mutual accusations of violations. With the renewed fighting, Israel succeeded in advancing south, materializing the threat to the Third Army's supply lines, but failed to capture Suez. A second ceasefire on 25 October officially ended the conflict.

The Yom Kippur War had significant consequences. The Arab world, humiliated by the 1967 defeat, felt psychologically vindicated by its early and late successes in 1973. Meanwhile, Israel, despite battlefield achievements, recognized that future military dominance was uncertain. These shifts contributed to the Israeli–Palestinian peace process, leading to the 1978 Camp David Accords, when Israel returned the Sinai Peninsula to Egypt, and the Egypt–Israel peace treaty, the first time an Arab country recognized Israel. Egypt drifted away from the Soviet Union, eventually leaving the Eastern Bloc.

== Background ==
=== Arab–Israeli conflict ===
The war was part of the Arab–Israeli conflict, an ongoing dispute that has included many battles and wars since the founding of the State of Israel in 1948. During the Six-Day War of 1967, Israel had captured Egypt's Sinai Peninsula, Egyptian-administered Gaza Strip, roughly half of Syria's Golan Heights, and the territories of the West Bank which had been held by Jordan since 1948.

On 19 June 1967, shortly after the Six-Day War, the Israeli government voted to return the Sinai to Egypt and the Golan Heights to Syria in exchange for a permanent peace settlement and a demilitarization of the returned territories. This decision was not made public at the time, nor was it conveyed to any Arab state. Israeli Foreign Minister Abba Eban has said that it had been conveyed, but there seems to be no solid evidence to corroborate his claim; no formal peace proposal was made either directly or indirectly by Israel. The Americans, who were briefed of the Cabinet's decision by Eban, were not asked to convey it to Cairo and Damascus as official peace proposals, nor were they given indications that Israel expected a reply. Eban rejected the prospect of a mediated peace, insisting of the need for direct negotiations with the Arab governments.

The Arab position, as it emerged in September 1967 at the Khartoum Arab Summit, was to reject any peaceful settlement with the State of Israel. The eight participating states—Egypt, Syria, Jordan, Lebanon, Iraq, Algeria, Kuwait, and Sudan—passed a resolution that would later become known as the "three nos": there would be no peace, no recognition and no negotiation with Israel. Prior to that, King Hussein of Jordan had stated that he could not rule out a possibility of a "real, permanent peace" between Israel and the Arab states.

Armed hostilities continued on a limited scale after the Six-Day War and escalated into the War of Attrition, an attempt to wear down the Israeli position through long-term pressure. In December 1970, Egyptian President Anwar Sadat had signaled in an interview with The New York Times that, in return for a total withdrawal from the Sinai Peninsula, he was ready "to recognize the rights of Israel as an independent state as defined by the Security Council of the United Nations." On 4 February 1971, Sadat gave a speech to the Egyptian National Assembly outlining a proposal under which Israel would withdraw from the Suez Canal and the Sinai Peninsula along with other occupied Arab territories.

Swedish diplomat Gunnar Jarring coincidentally proposed a similar initiative four days later, on 8 February 1971. Egypt responded by accepting much of Jarring's proposals, though differing on several issues, regarding the Gaza Strip, for example, and expressed its willingness to reach an accord if it also implemented the provisions of United Nations Security Council Resolution 242. This was the first time an Arab government had gone public declaring its readiness to sign a peace agreement with Israel.

Israeli Prime Minister Golda Meir reacted to the overture by forming a committee to examine the proposal and vet possible concessions. When the committee unanimously concluded that Israel's interests would be served by full withdrawal to the internationally recognized lines dividing Israel from Egypt and Syria, returning the Gaza Strip and, in a majority view, returning most of the West Bank and East Jerusalem, Meir was angered and shelved the document.

The United States was infuriated by the cool Israeli response to Egypt's proposal, and Assistant Secretary of State for Near Eastern Affairs Joseph Sisco informed Israeli ambassador Yitzhak Rabin that "Israel would be regarded responsible for rejecting the best opportunity to reach peace since the establishment of the state." Israel responded to Jarring's plan on 26 February by outlining its readiness to make some form of withdrawal, while declaring it had no intention of returning to the pre-5 June 1967 lines. Explicating the response, Eban told the Knesset that the pre-5 June 1967 lines "cannot assure Israel against aggression". Jarring was disappointed and blamed Israel for refusing to accept a complete pullout from the Sinai Peninsula.

The U.S. considered Israel an ally in the Cold War and had been supplying the Israeli military since the 1960s. U.S. National Security Advisor Henry Kissinger believed that the regional balance of power hinged on maintaining Israel's military dominance over Arab countries and that an Arab victory in the region would strengthen Soviet influence. Britain's position, on the other hand, was that war between the Arabs and Israelis could only be prevented by the implementation of United Nations Security Council Resolution 242 and a return to the pre-1967 boundaries.

Sadat also had important domestic concerns in wanting war. "The three years since Sadat had taken office ... were the most demoralized in Egyptian history. ... A desiccated economy added to the nation's despondency. War was a desperate option." Almost a full year before the war, in a meeting on 24 October 1972, with his Supreme Council of the Armed Forces, Sadat declared his intention to go to war with Israel even without proper Soviet support.

In February 1973, Sadat made a final peace overture that would have included Israeli withdrawal from the Sinai Peninsula that he relayed to Kissinger via his adviser Mohammad Hafez Ismail, which Kissinger made known to Meir. Meir rejected the peace proposal, and did not reconsider after Israeli leadership concluded, two months later, that this would result in imminent war with Egypt.

=== Lead up to the war ===
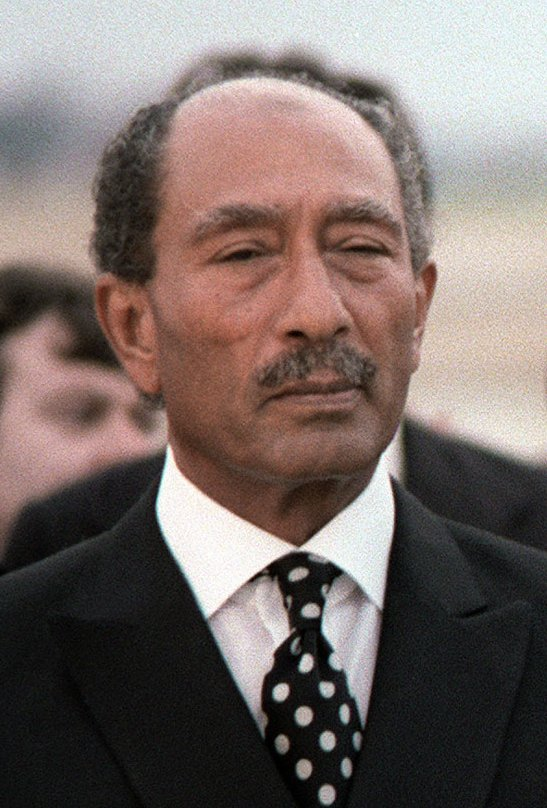
Egyptian President Anwar Sadat

Four months before the war broke out, Kissinger made an offer to Ismail, Sadat's emissary. Kissinger proposed returning the Sinai Peninsula to Egyptian control and an Israeli withdrawal from all of Sinai, except for some strategic points. Ismail said he would return with Sadat's reply, but he never did. Sadat was already determined to go to war. Only an American guarantee that the United States would fulfill the entire Arab program in a brief time could have dissuaded Sadat.

Sadat had previously declared that Egypt was prepared to "sacrifice a million Egyptian soldiers" in a war with Israel. From the end of 1972, Egypt began a concentrated effort to build up its forces, receiving MiG-21 jet fighters, SA-2, SA-3, SA-6 and SA-7 antiaircraft missiles, T-55 and T-62 tanks, RPG-7 antitank weapons, and the AT-3 Sagger anti-tank guided missile from the Soviet Union and improving its military tactics, based on Soviet battlefield doctrines. Political generals, who had in large part been responsible for the rout in 1967, were replaced with competent ones.

Egypt aimed to secure a foothold on the eastern bank of the Suez Canal and use it to negotiate the return of the Sinai Peninsula.

The Soviets thought little of Sadat's chances in any war. They warned that any attempt to cross the heavily fortified Suez Canal would incur massive losses. Both the Soviets and Americans were at that time pursuing détente and had no interest in seeing the Middle East destabilized. In a June 1973 meeting with American President Richard Nixon, Soviet leader Leonid Brezhnev had proposed Israel pull back to its 1967 border. Brezhnev said that if Israel did not, "we will have difficulty keeping the military situation from flaring up"—an indication that the Soviet Union had been unable to restrain Sadat's plans.

Between May and August 1973, the Egyptian Army conducted military exercises near the border, and Ashraf Marwan inaccurately warned that Egypt and Syria would launch a surprise attack in the middle of May. The Israeli Army mobilized with their Blue-White Alert, in response to both the warnings and exercises, at considerable cost. These exercises led some Israelis to dismiss the actual war preparations—and Marwan's warning right before the attack was launched—as another exercise.

In the week leading up to Yom Kippur, the Egyptian Army staged a week-long training exercise adjacent to the Suez Canal. Israeli intelligence, detecting large troop movements towards the canal, dismissed them as mere training exercises. Movements of Syrian troops towards the border were also detected, as were the cancellation of leaves and a call-up of reserves in the Syrian army. These activities were considered puzzling but not a threat because Israeli intelligence suggested they would not attack without Egypt, and Egypt would not attack until the weaponry they wanted arrived. Despite this belief, Israel sent reinforcements to the Golan Heights. These forces were to prove critical during the early days of the war.

On 27 to 30 September, two batches of reservists were called up by the Egyptian Army to participate in these exercises. Two days before the outbreak of the war, on 4 October, the Egyptian command publicly announced the demobilization of part of the reservists called up during 27 September to lull Israeli suspicions. Around 20,000 troops were demobilized, and subsequently some of these men were given leave to perform the Umrah (pilgrimage) to Mecca.

According to Egyptian General El-Gamasy, "On the initiative of the operations staff, we reviewed the situation on the ground and developed a framework for the planned offensive operation. We studied the technical characteristics of the Suez Canal, the ebb and the flow of the tides, the speed of the currents and their direction, hours of darkness and of moonlight, weather conditions, and related conditions in the Mediterranean and Red sea." He explained further by saying: "Saturday 6 October 1973 (10 Ramadan 1393) was the day chosen for the September–October option. Conditions for a crossing were good, it was a fast day in Israel, and the moon on that day, 10 Ramadan, shone from sunset until midnight." The war coincided that year with the Muslim month of Ramadan, when many Muslim soldiers fast. On the other hand, the fact that the attack was launched on Yom Kippur may have helped Israel to more easily marshal reserves from their homes and synagogues because roads and communication lines were largely open, easing the mobilization and transportation of the military.

Despite refusing to participate, King Hussein of Jordan "had met with Sadat and Assad in Alexandria two weeks before. Given the mutual suspicions prevailing among the Arab leaders, it was unlikely that he had been told any specific war plans. But it was probable that Sadat and Assad had raised the prospect of war against Israel in more general terms to feel out the likelihood of Jordan joining in."

On the night of 25 September, Hussein secretly flew to Tel Aviv to warn Meir of an impending Syrian attack. "Are they going to war without the Egyptians, asked Mrs. Meir. The king said he didn't think so. 'I think they [Egypt] would cooperate.'" This warning was ignored, and Israeli intelligence indicated that Hussein had not said anything that was not already known. Throughout September, Israel received eleven warnings of war from well-placed sources. However, Mossad Director-General Zvi Zamir continued to insist that war was not an Arab option, even after Hussein's warning. Zamir would later remark that "We simply didn't feel them capable [of war]."

Several days before the war began, Lieutenant Colonel Aviezer Ya'ari, head of the Syria, Lebanon, and Iraq desk of Israeli military intelligence, suggested that the Egyptian and Syrian military exercises which were underway might be preparations for a combined attack. He was reprimanded and later told the Agranat Commission that he subsequently became more cautious in his estimates.

On the day before the war, General Ariel Sharon was shown aerial photographs and other intelligence by Yehoshua Saguy, his divisional intelligence officer. Sharon noticed that the concentration of Egyptian forces along the canal was far beyond anything observed during the training exercises, and that the Egyptians had amassed all of their crossing equipment along the canal. He then called General Shmuel Gonen, who had replaced him as head of Southern Command, and expressed his certainty that war was imminent.

Zamir's concern grew on 4–5 October, as additional signs of an impending attack were detected. Soviet advisers and their families left Egypt and Syria, transport aircraft thought to be laden with military equipment landed in Cairo and Damascus, and aerial photographs revealed that Egyptian and Syrian concentrations of tanks, infantry, and surface-to-air missiles (SAMs) were at an unprecedented high. According to declassified documents from the Agranat Commission, Brigadier General Yisrael Lior (Meir's military secretary/attaché) said that Mossad knew from Marwan that an attack was going to occur under the guise of a military drill a week before it occurred, but the process of passing along the information to the prime minister's office failed.

On the night of 5–6 October, Marwan incorrectly informed Zamir that a joint Syrian-Egyptian attack would take place at sunset the following day. It was this warning in particular, combined with the large number of other warnings, that finally goaded the Israeli High Command into action. Just hours before the attack began, orders went out for a partial call-up of the Israeli reserves.

=== Israeli preparation ===
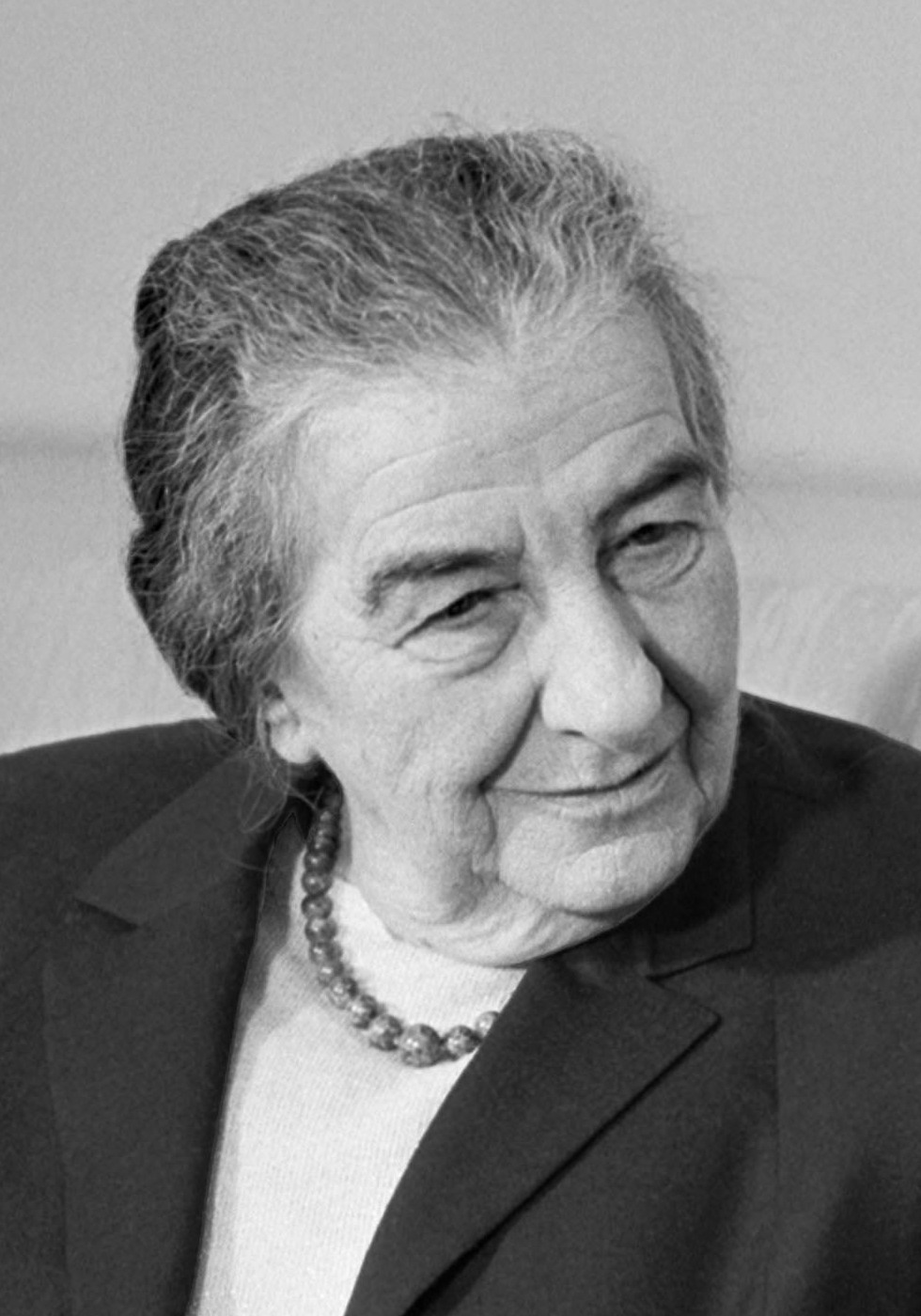
Upon learning of the impending attack, Prime Minister of Israel Golda Meir made the controversial decision not to launch a pre-emptive strike.

Prime Minister Golda Meir, Minister of Defense Moshe Dayan and Chief of General Staff David Elazar met at 8:05 am on the morning of Yom Kippur, six hours before the war began. Elazar proposed a mobilization of the entire air force and four armored divisions, or 100,000 to 120,000 troops, while Dayan favored a mobilization of the air force and two armored divisions, or around 70,000 troops. Meir chose Elazar's proposal. Elazar argued in favor of a pre-emptive attack against Syrian airfields at noon, Syrian missiles at 3:00 pm, and Syrian ground forces at 5:00 pm:

When the presentations were done, the prime minister hemmed uncertainly for a few moments but then came to a clear decision. There would be no preemptive strike. Israel might be needing American assistance soon and it was imperative that it would not be blamed for starting the war. 'If we strike first, we won't get help from anybody,' she said.

Prior to the war, Kissinger and Nixon consistently warned Meir that she must not be responsible for initiating a Middle East war, and on 6 October 1973, Kissinger sent a further dispatch discouraging a preemptive strike. Israel was totally dependent on the United States for military resupply and sensitive to anything that might endanger that relationship. At 10:15 am, Meir met with American ambassador Kenneth Keating to inform him that Israel did not intend to preemptively start a war and asked that American efforts be directed at preventing war.

Kissinger urged the Soviets to use their influence to prevent war, contacted Egypt with Israel's message of non-preemption, and sent messages to other Arab governments to enlist their help on the side of moderation. These late efforts were futile. According to Kissinger, had Israel struck first it would not have received "so much as a nail" in support from the United States.

== Sinai front ==
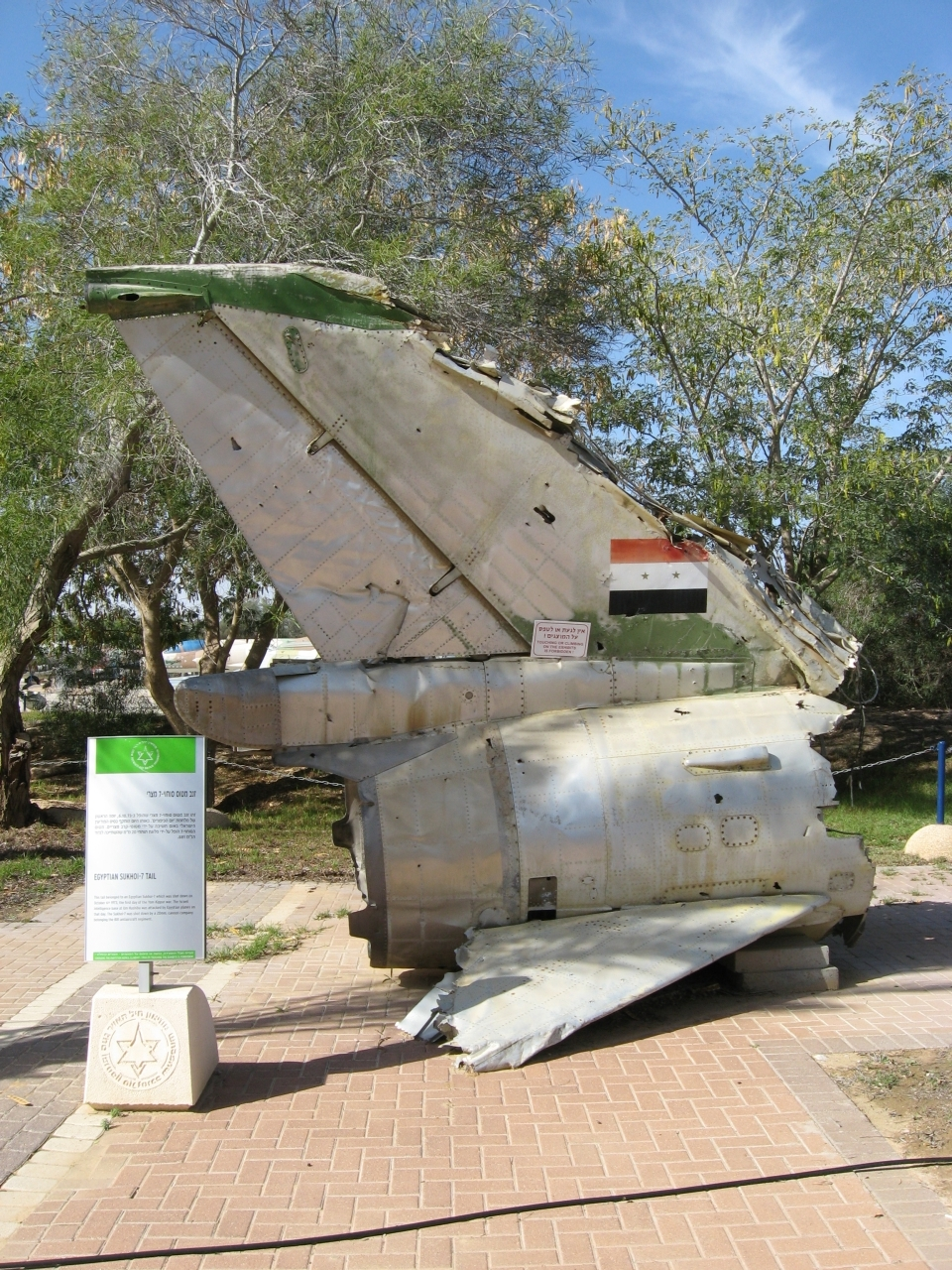
Wreckage from an Egyptian Sukhoi Su-7 shot down over the Sinai on 6 October, Israeli Air Force Museum

The Egyptians had prepared for an assault across the canal and deployed five divisions totaling 100,000 soldiers, 1,350 tanks and 2,000 guns and heavy mortars for the onslaught. Facing them were 450 soldiers of the Jerusalem Brigade, spread out in 16 forts along the length of the canal. There were 290 Israeli tanks in all of Sinai, divided into three armored brigades, only one of which was deployed near the canal when hostilities commenced.

Large bridgeheads were established on the east bank on 6 October. Israeli armoured forces launched counterattacks from 6 to 8 October, but they were often piecemeal and inadequately supported and were beaten back principally by Egyptians using portable anti-tank missiles. Between 9 and 12 October, the American response was a call for a cease-fire in place. The Egyptian units generally would not advance beyond a shallow strip for fear of losing the protection of their SAM batteries, which were situated on the west bank of the canal. In the Six-Day War, the Israeli Air Force had pummeled the defenseless Arab armies; this time, Egypt had heavily fortified their side of the ceasefire lines with SAM batteries provided by the Soviet Union.

On 9 October, the IDF chose to concentrate its reserves and build up its supplies while the Egyptians remained on the strategic defensive. Nixon and Kissinger held back on a full-scale resupply of arms to Israel. Short of supplies, the Israeli government reluctantly accepted a cease-fire in place on 12 October, but Sadat refused to do so. The Soviets started an airlift of arms to Syria and Egypt. The American global interest was to prove that Soviet arms could not dictate the outcome of the fighting, by supplying Israel. With an airlift in full swing, Washington was prepared to wait until Israeli success on the battlefield might persuade the Arabs and the Soviets to bring the fighting to an end.

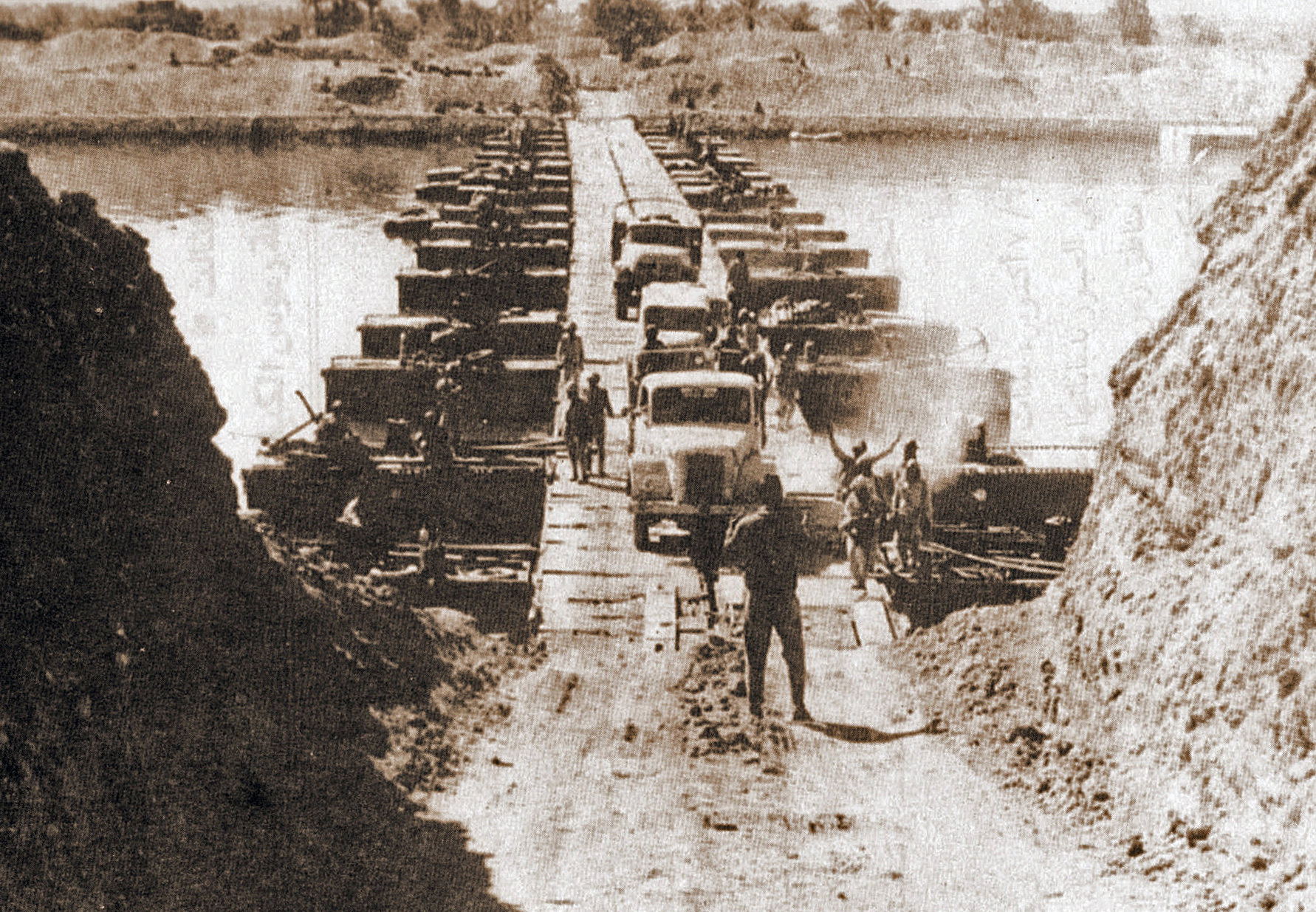
Egyptian forces crossing the Suez Canal

The Israelis decided to counterattack once Egyptian armor attempted to expand the bridgehead beyond the protective SAM umbrella. The riposte, codenamed Operation Gazelle, was launched on 15 October. IDF forces spearheaded by Ariel Sharon's division broke through the Tasa corridor and crossed the Suez Canal to the north of the Great Bitter Lake. After intense fighting, the IDF progressed towards Cairo and advanced southwards on the east bank of the Great Bitter Lake and in the southern extent of the canal right up to Port Suez. Israeli progress towards Cairo was brought to a halt by a fresh ceasefire on 24 October.

=== Egyptian attack ===
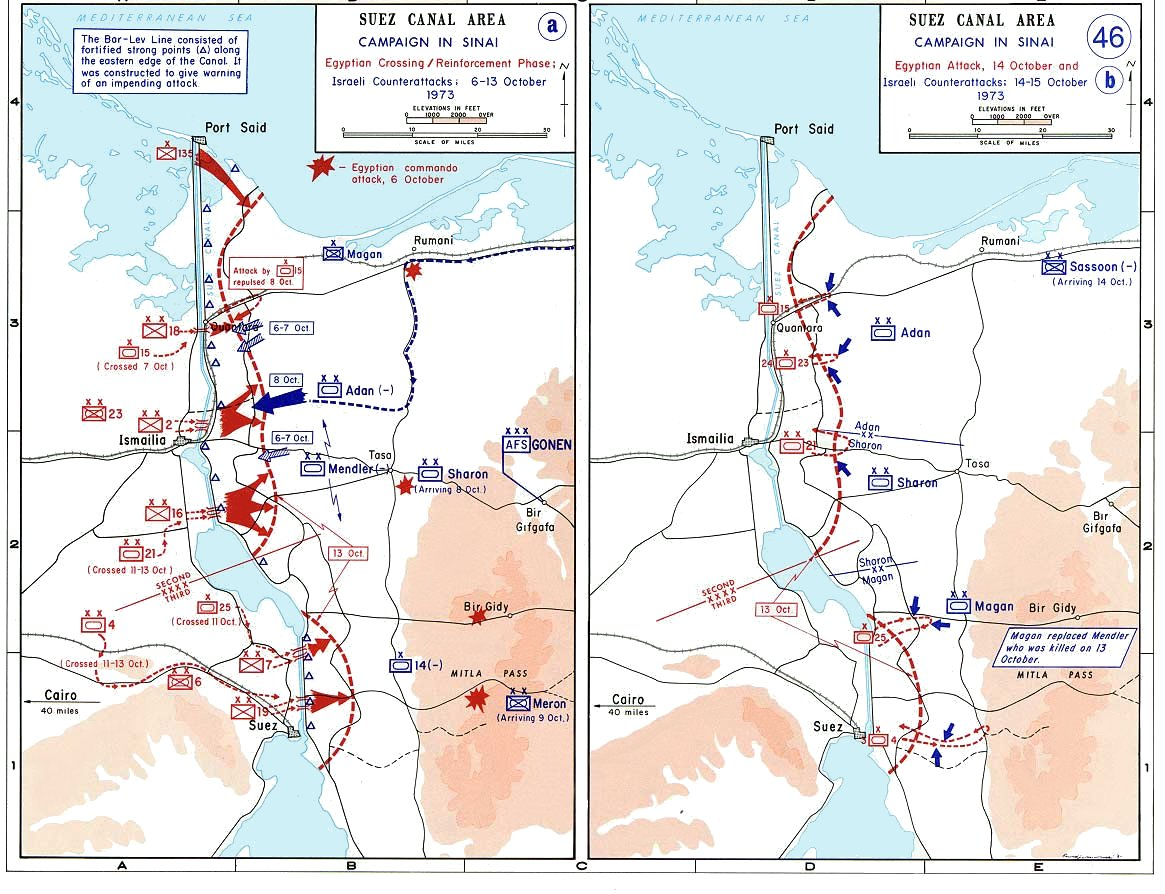
The 1973 War in the Sinai, 6–15 October

Anticipating a swift Israeli armored counterattack by three armored divisions, the Egyptians had armed their assault force with large numbers of man-portable anti-tank weapons—rocket-propelled grenades and the less numerous but more advanced Sagger guided missiles, which proved devastating to the first Israeli armored counterattacks. Each of the five infantry divisions that were to cross the canal had been equipped with RPG-7 rockets and RPG-43 grenades and reinforced with an anti-tank guided missile battalion, as they would not have any armor support for nearly 12 hours. In addition, the Egyptians had built separate ramps at the crossing points, reaching as high as 21 metres (69 ft) to counter the Israeli sand wall, provide covering fire for the assaulting infantry and to counter the first Israeli armored counterattacks.

The Egyptian Army put great effort into finding a quick and effective way of breaching the Israeli defenses. The Israelis had built large 18-metre (59 foot) high sand walls with a 60-degree slope and reinforced with concrete at the water line. Egyptian engineers initially experimented with explosive charges and bulldozers to clear the obstacles, before a junior officer proposed using high pressure water cannons. The idea was tested and found to be a sound one, and several high pressure water cannons were imported from Britain and East Germany. The water cannons effectively breached the sand walls using water from the canal.

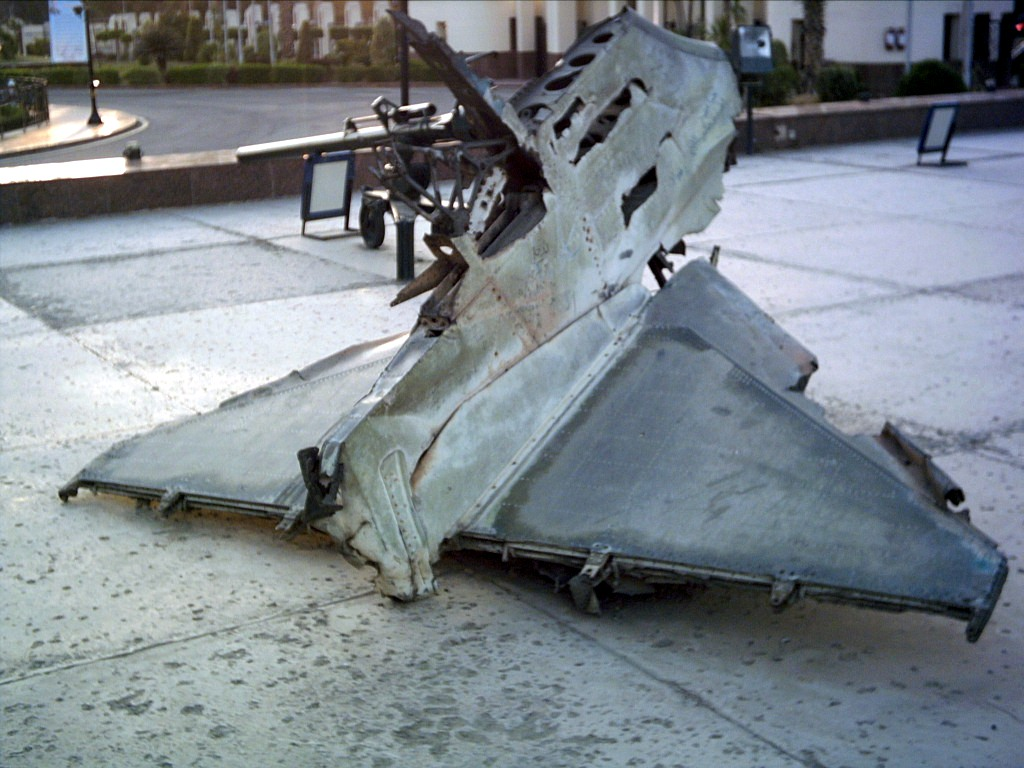
Wreckage of an Israeli A-4 Skyhawk on display in Egypt's war museum.

Egyptian Sukhoi Su-7 fighter jets conducting air strikes over the Bar Lev Line on 6 October

At 2:00 pm on 6 October, Operation Badr began with a large airstrike. More than 200 Egyptian aircraft conducted simultaneous strikes against three airbases, Hawk missile batteries, three command centers, artillery positions, and several radar installations. Airfields at Refidim and Bir Tamada were temporarily put out of service, and damage was inflicted on a Hawk battery at Ophir. The aerial assault was coupled with a barrage from more than 2,000 artillery pieces for a period of 53 minutes against the Bar Lev Line and rear area command posts and concentration bases.

Author Andrew McGregor wrote that the success of the first strike negated the need for a second planned strike. Egypt acknowledged the loss of five aircraft during the attack. Kenneth Pollack wrote that 18 Egyptian aircraft were shot down, and that these losses prompted the cancellation of the second planned wave. In one notable engagement during this period, a pair of Israeli F-4E Phantoms challenged 28 Egyptian MiGs over Sharm el-Sheikh and within half an hour, shot down seven or eight MiGs with no losses. One of the Egyptian pilots killed was Captain Atef Sadat, President Sadat's half-brother.

Simultaneously, 14 Egyptian Tupolev Tu-16 bombers attacked Israeli targets in the Sinai with Kelt missiles, while another two Egyptian Tupolevs fired two Kelt missiles at a radar station in central Israel. One missile was shot down by a patrolling Israeli Mirage fighter, and the second fell into the sea. The attack was an attempt to warn Israel that Egypt could retaliate if it bombed targets deep within Egyptian territory.

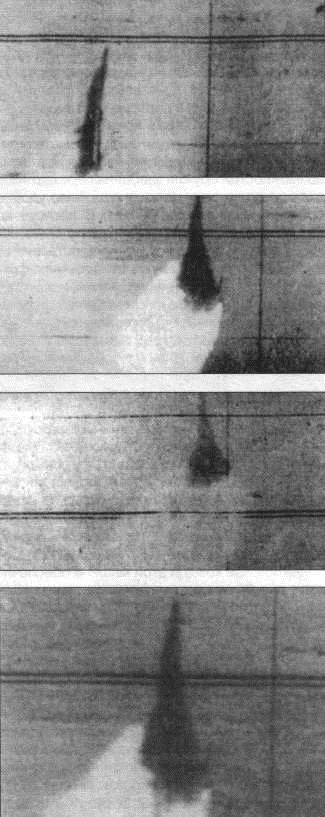
An Israeli Mirage III shot down by an Egyptian MiG-21

Under cover of the initial artillery barrage, the Egyptian assault force of 32,000 infantry began crossing the canal in twelve waves at five separate crossing areas, from 14:05 to 17:30, in what became known as The Crossing. The Egyptians prevented Israeli forces from reinforcing the Bar Lev Line and proceeded to attack the Israeli fortifications. Meanwhile, engineers crossed over to breach the sand wall. The Israeli Air Force conducted air interdiction operations to try to prevent the bridges from being erected, but took losses from Egyptian SAM batteries. The air attacks were ineffective overall, as the sectional design of the bridges enabled quick repairs when hit.

Despite fierce resistance, the Israeli reserve brigade garrisoning the Bar-Lev forts was overwhelmed. According to Shazly, within six hours, fifteen strongpoints had been captured as Egyptian forces advanced several kilometres into the Sinai. Shazly's account was disputed by Kenneth Pollack, who noted that for the most part, the forts only fell to repeated assaults by superior forces or prolonged sieges over many days. The northernmost fortification of the Bar Lev Line, code-named 'Fort Budapest', withstood repeated assaults and remained in Israeli hands throughout the war. Once the bridges were laid, additional infantry with the remaining portable and recoilless anti-tank weapons began to cross the canal, while the first Egyptian tanks started to cross at 20:30.

The Egyptians also attempted to land several heli-borne commando units in various areas in the Sinai to hamper the arrival of Israeli reserves. This attempt met with disaster as the Israelis shot down up to 20 helicopters, inflicting heavy casualties. Israeli Major General (res.) Chaim Herzog placed Egyptian helicopter losses at 14. Other sources say that "several" helicopters were downed with "total loss of life" and that the few commandos that did filter through were ineffectual and presented nothing more than a "nuisance". Kenneth Pollack asserted that despite their heavy losses, the Egyptian commandos fought exceptionally hard and created considerable panic, prompting the Israelis to take precautions that hindered their ability to concentrate on stopping the assault across the canal.

Egyptian forces advanced approximately 4 to 5 km (2 1/2 to 3 mi) into the Sinai Desert with two armies (both corps-sized by western standards, included the 2nd Infantry Division in the northern Second Army). By the following morning, some 850 tanks had crossed the canal. In his account of the war, Saad El Shazly noted that by the morning of 7 October, the Egyptians had lost 280 soldiers and 20 tanks, though this account is disputed.

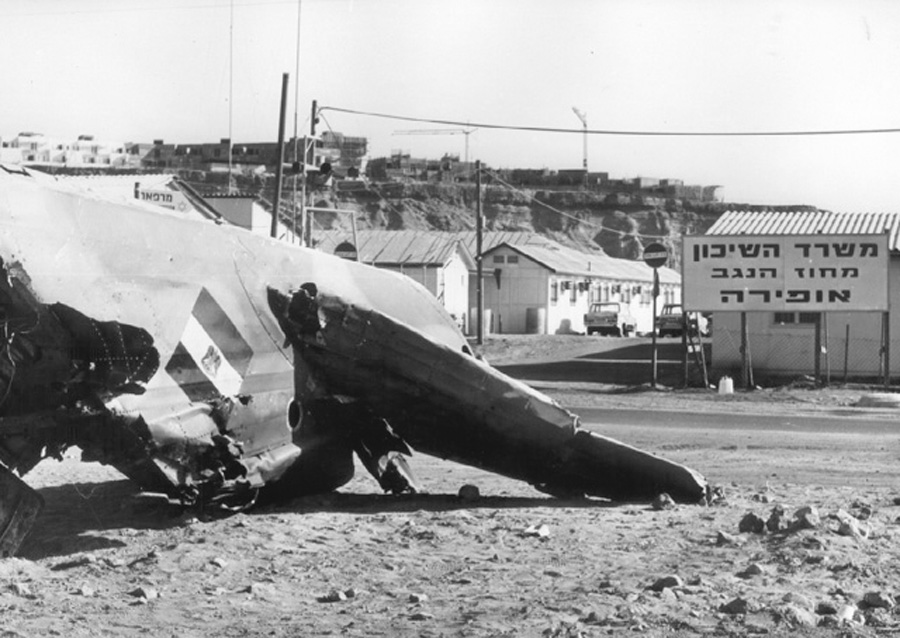
An Egyptian MiG-17 shot down during the dogfight over Sharm el-Sheikh

Most Israeli soldiers defending the Bar Lev Line became casualties, and some 200 were taken prisoner. In the subsequent days, some defenders of the Bar Lev Line managed to break through the Egyptian encirclement and return to their lines or were extracted during later Israeli counterattacks. For the next several days, the IAF played a minimal role in the fighting, largely because it was needed to deal with the simultaneous, and ultimately more threatening, Syrian attack in the Golan Heights.

Egyptian forces then consolidated their initial positions. On 7 October, the bridgeheads were enlarged an additional 4 km (2 1/2 mi), at the same time repulsing Israeli counterattacks. In the north, the Egyptian 18th Division attacked the town of El-Qantarah el-Sharqiyya, engaging Israeli forces in and around the town. The fighting there was conducted at close quarters, and was sometimes hand-to-hand. The Egyptians were forced to clear the town building by building. By evening, most of the town was in Egyptian hands. El-Qantarah was completely cleared by the next morning.

Meanwhile, the Egyptian commandos airdropped on 6 October began encountering Israeli reserves the following morning. Both sides suffered heavy losses, but the commandos were at times successful in delaying the movement of Israeli reserves to the front. These special operations often led to confusion and anxiety among Israeli commanders, who commended the Egyptian commandos. This view was contradicted by another source that stated that few commandos made it to their objectives, and were usually nothing more than a nuisance. The most significant attempt to delay the arrival of the Israeli reserves by Egyptian commandos was the Romani ambush, in which an Egyptian commando company ambushed reserve forces of the IDF's 162nd Division. Around 10 IDF soldiers and 70 Egyptian commandos were killed. According to Abraham Rabinovich, only the commandos near Baluza and those blocking the road to Fort Budapest had measurable success. Of the 1,700 Egyptian commandos inserted behind Israeli lines during the war, 740 were killed—many in downed helicopters—and 330 taken prisoner.

=== Failed Israeli counter-attack ===
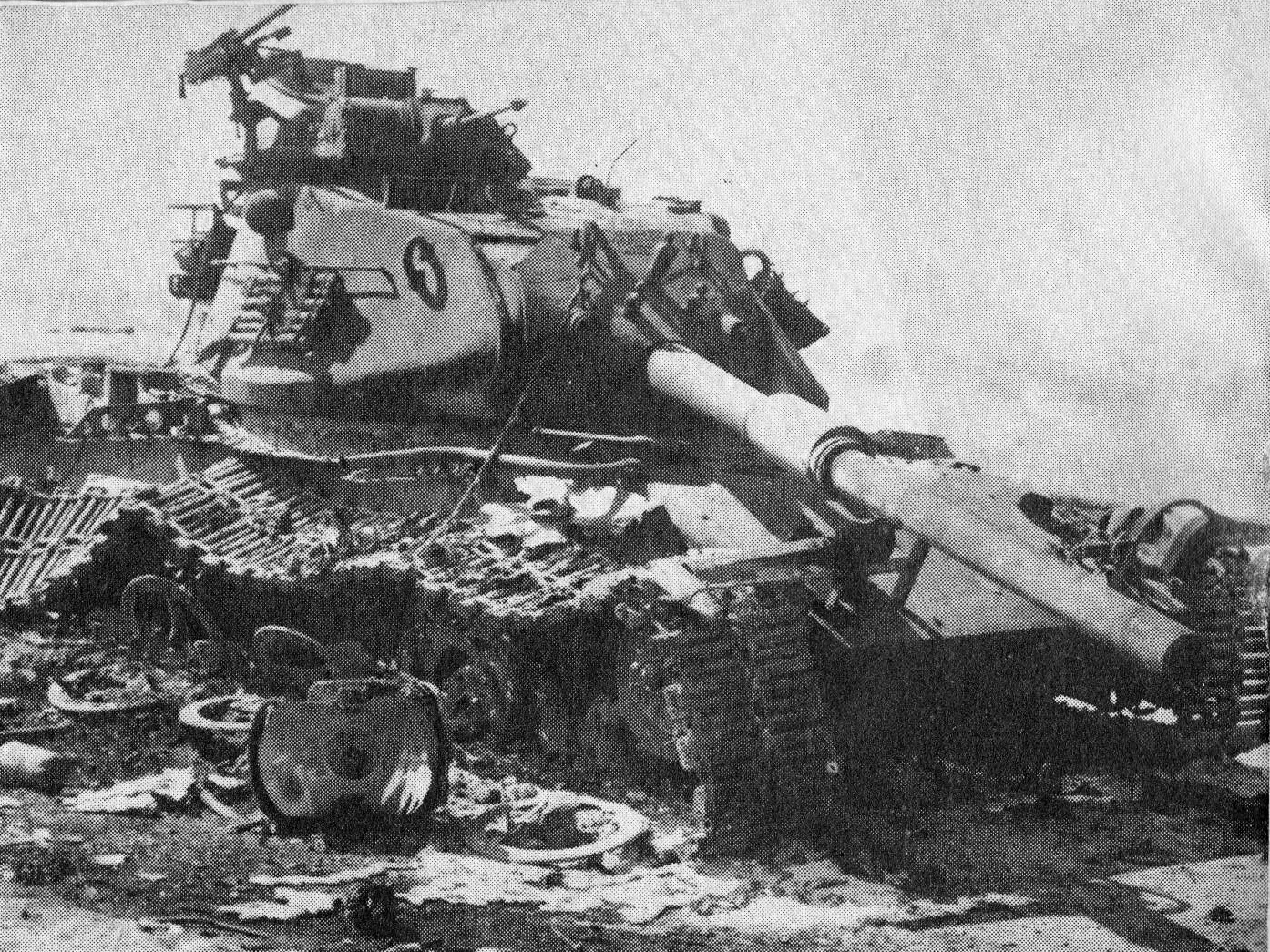
An Israeli M60 Patton tank destroyed in the Sinai

On 7 October, David Elazar visited Shmuel Gonen, commander of the Israeli Southern Command—who had only taken the position three months before at the retirement of Ariel Sharon—and met with Israeli commanders. The Israelis planned a cautious counterattack for the following day by Avraham Adan's 162nd Armored Division. The same day, the IAF carried out Operation Tagar, aiming to neutralize Egyptian Air Force bases and its missile defense shield.

Seven Egyptian airbases were damaged, with the loss of two A-4 Skyhawks and their pilots. Two more planned attacks were called off because of the increasing need for air power on the Syrian front. The IAF carried out additional air attacks against Egyptian forces on the east bank of the canal, reportedly inflicting heavy losses. Israeli jets had carried out hundreds of sorties against Egyptian targets by the following day, but the Egyptian SAM shield inflicted heavy losses. IAF aircraft losses amounted to three aircraft for every 200 sorties, an unsustainable rate. The Israelis responded by rapidly devising new tactics to thwart the Egyptian air defenses.

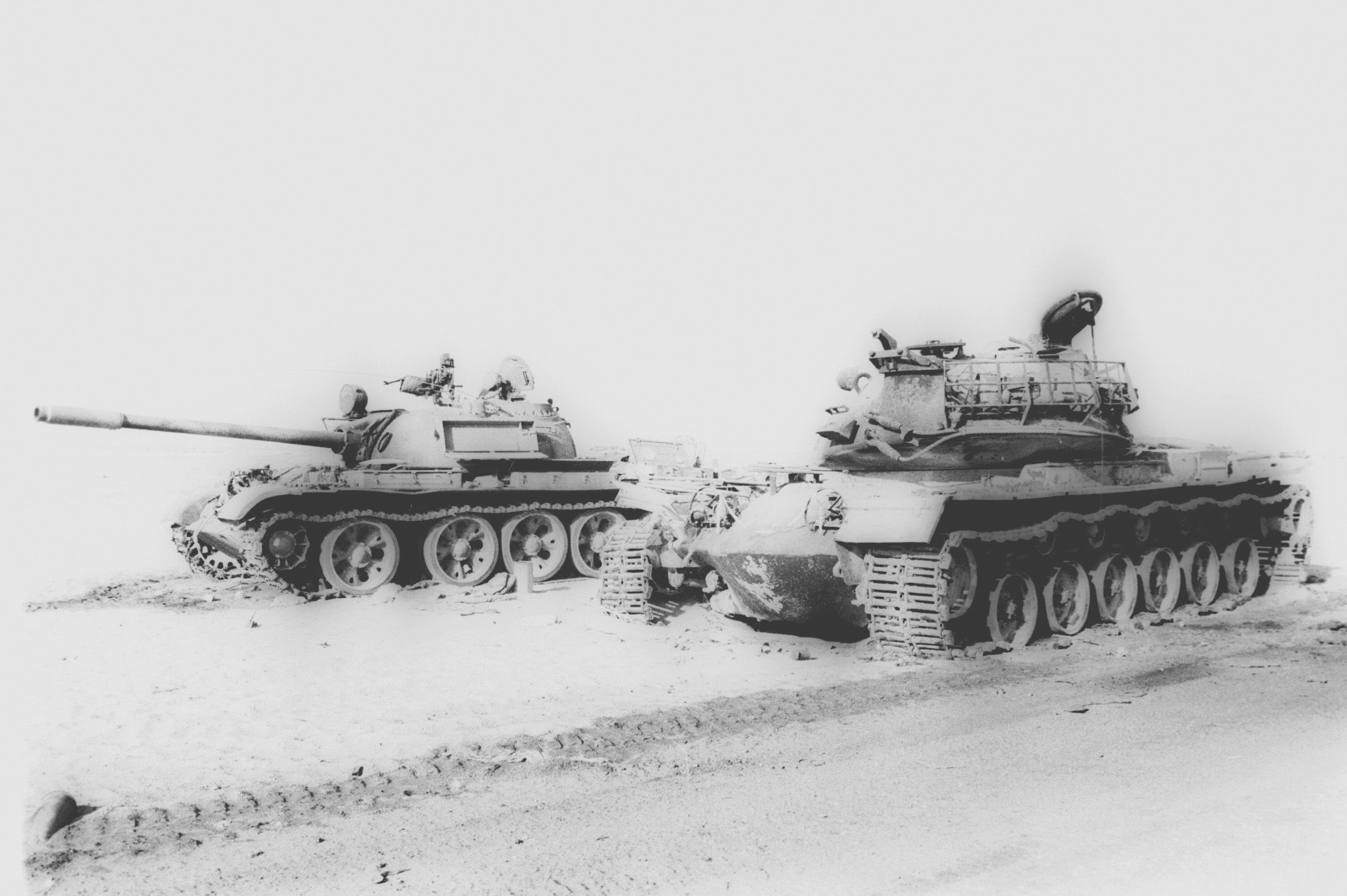
Wrecks of Israeli and Egyptian armour stand directly opposed one another in a testament to the ferocity of the combat near the Suez Canal.

On 8 October, after Elazar had left, Gonen changed the plans on the basis of unduly optimistic field reports. Adan's division was composed of three brigades totaling 183 tanks. One of the brigades was still en route to the area, and would participate in the attack by noon, along with a supporting mechanized infantry brigade with an additional 44 tanks. The Israeli counterattack was in the direction of the Bar Lev strongpoints opposite the city of Ismailia, against entrenched Egyptian infantry. In a series of ill-coordinated attacks which were met by stiff resistance from Egyptian tanks, artillery, and infantry armed with anti-tank rockets, the Israelis were repulsed with heavy losses.

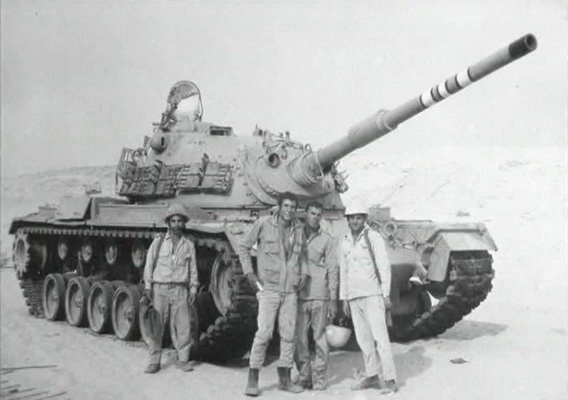
Egyptian soldiers pose in front of a captured Israeli Magach 3 (M48) tank

An initial Israeli attack by some 25 tanks broke through the first Egyptian troops and managed to come within 800 metres (2,600 ft) of the canal before coming under withering fire. The Israelis lost 18 tanks within minutes and most of the commanders were killed or wounded. This was followed by a second attack by elements of two Israeli brigades, which had communication and coordination problems. The Egyptians allowed the Israelis to advance and then encircled them in a prepared kill zone before opening fire, wiping out most of the Israeli force within 13 minutes. The Egyptians destroyed over 50 Israeli tanks and captured eight intact.

That afternoon, Egyptian forces advanced once more to deepen their bridgeheads, and as a result the Israelis lost several strategic positions. Further Israeli attacks to regain the lost ground proved futile. Towards nightfall, an Egyptian counterattack was repulsed with the loss of 50 Egyptian tanks by the Israeli 143rd Armored Division, which was led by Ariel Sharon, who had been reinstated as a division commander at the outset of the war. Gawrych, citing Egyptian sources, documented Egyptian tank losses up to 13 October at 240.

=== Temporary stabilization ===
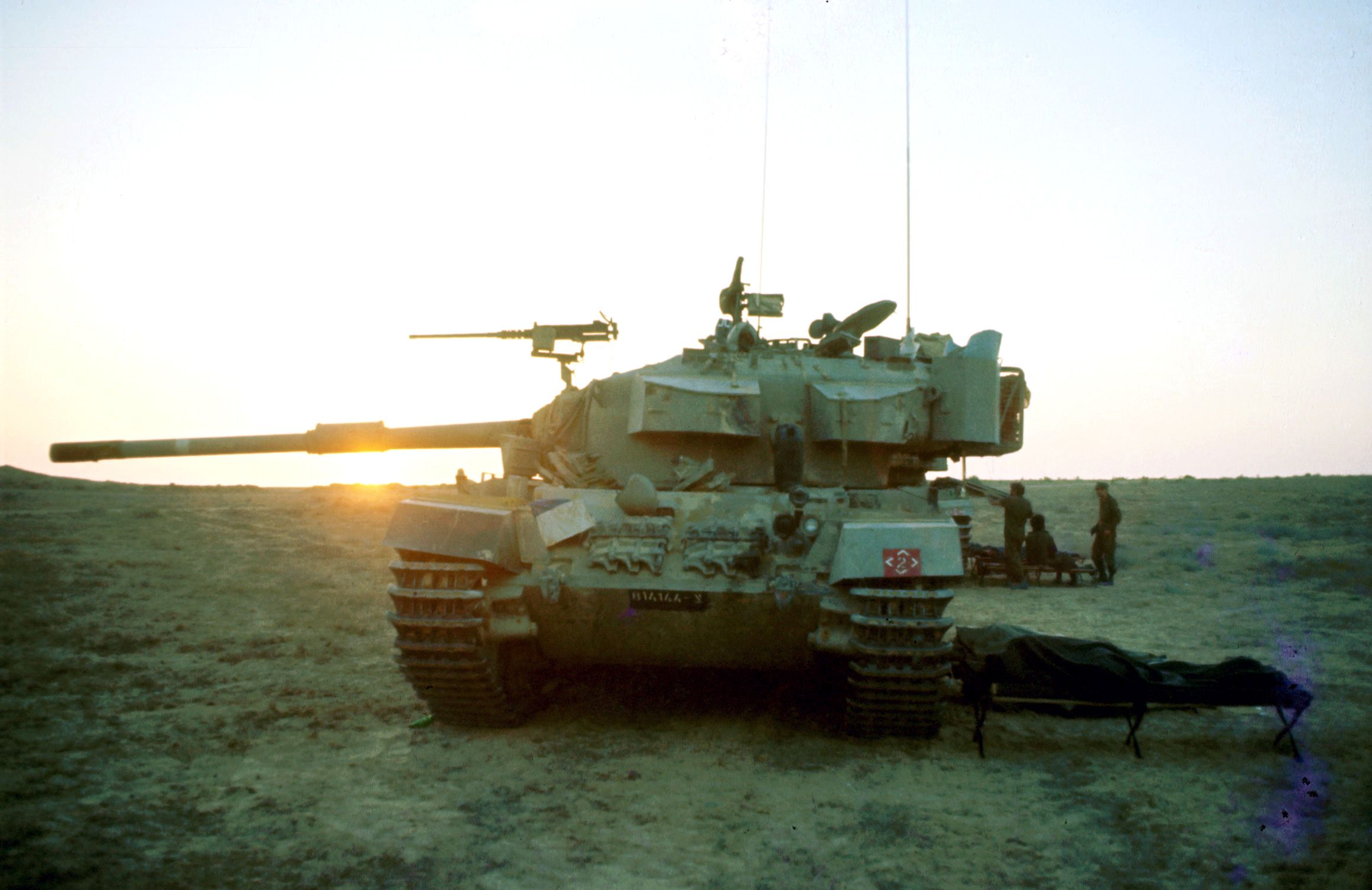
An Israeli Centurion tank operating in the Sinai

According to Herzog, by 9 October the front lines had stabilized. The Egyptians were unable to advance further, and Egyptian armored attacks on 9 and 10 October were repulsed with heavy losses. However, this was disputed by Shazly, who said that the Egyptians continued to advance and improve their positions well into 10 October. He pointed to one engagement, which involved elements of the 1st Infantry Brigade, attached to the 19th Division, which captured Ayoun Mousa, south of Suez.

The Egyptian 1st Mechanized Brigade launched a failed attack southward along the Gulf of Suez in the direction of Ras Sudar. Leaving the safety of the SAM umbrella, the force was attacked by Israeli aircraft and suffered heavy losses.

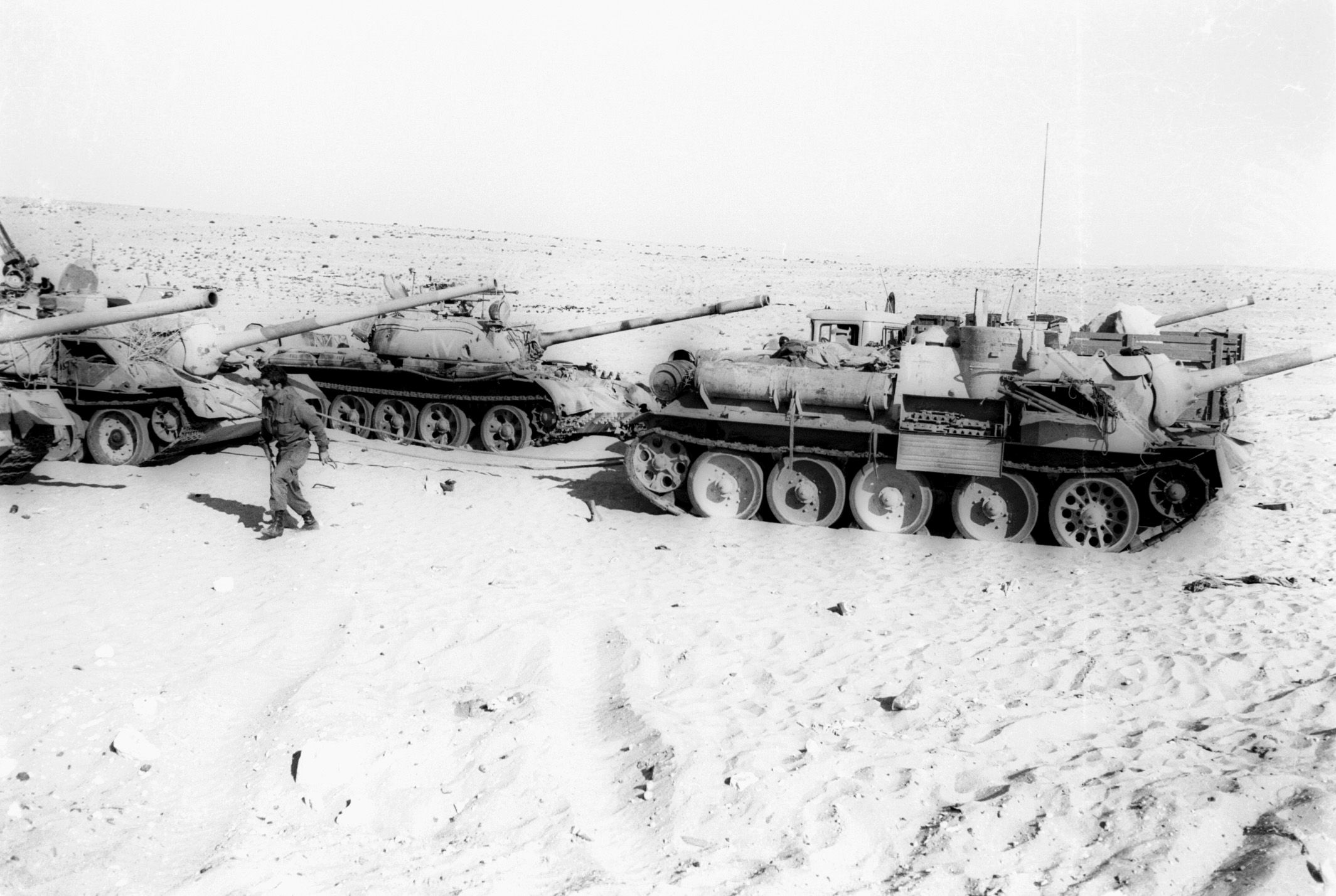
Abandoned or destroyed Egyptian armour being collected by IDF personnel, 12 October 1973

Between 10 and 13 October, both sides refrained from any large-scale actions, and the situation was relatively stable. Both sides launched small-scale attacks, and the Egyptians used helicopters to land commandos behind Israeli lines. Some Egyptian helicopters were shot down, and those commando forces that managed to land were quickly destroyed by Israeli troops. In one key engagement on 13 October, a particularly large Egyptian incursion was stopped and close to a hundred Egyptian commandos were killed.

=== Battle of the Sinai ===
On 14 October, an engagement now known as the Battle of the Sinai took place. In preparation for the attack, Egyptian helicopters set down 100 commandos near the Lateral Road to disrupt the Israeli rear. An Israeli reconnaissance unit quickly subdued them, killing 60 and taking numerous prisoners. Still bruised by the extensive losses their commandos had suffered on the opening day of the war, the Egyptians were unable or unwilling to implement further commando operations that had been planned in conjunction with the armored attack.

General Shazly strongly opposed any eastward advance that would leave his armor without adequate air cover. He was overruled by General Ismail and Sadat, whose aims were to seize the strategic Mitla and Gidi Passes and the Israeli nerve centre at Refidim, which they hoped would relieve pressure on the Syrians (who were by now on the defensive) by forcing Israel to shift divisions from Syria to the Sinai.

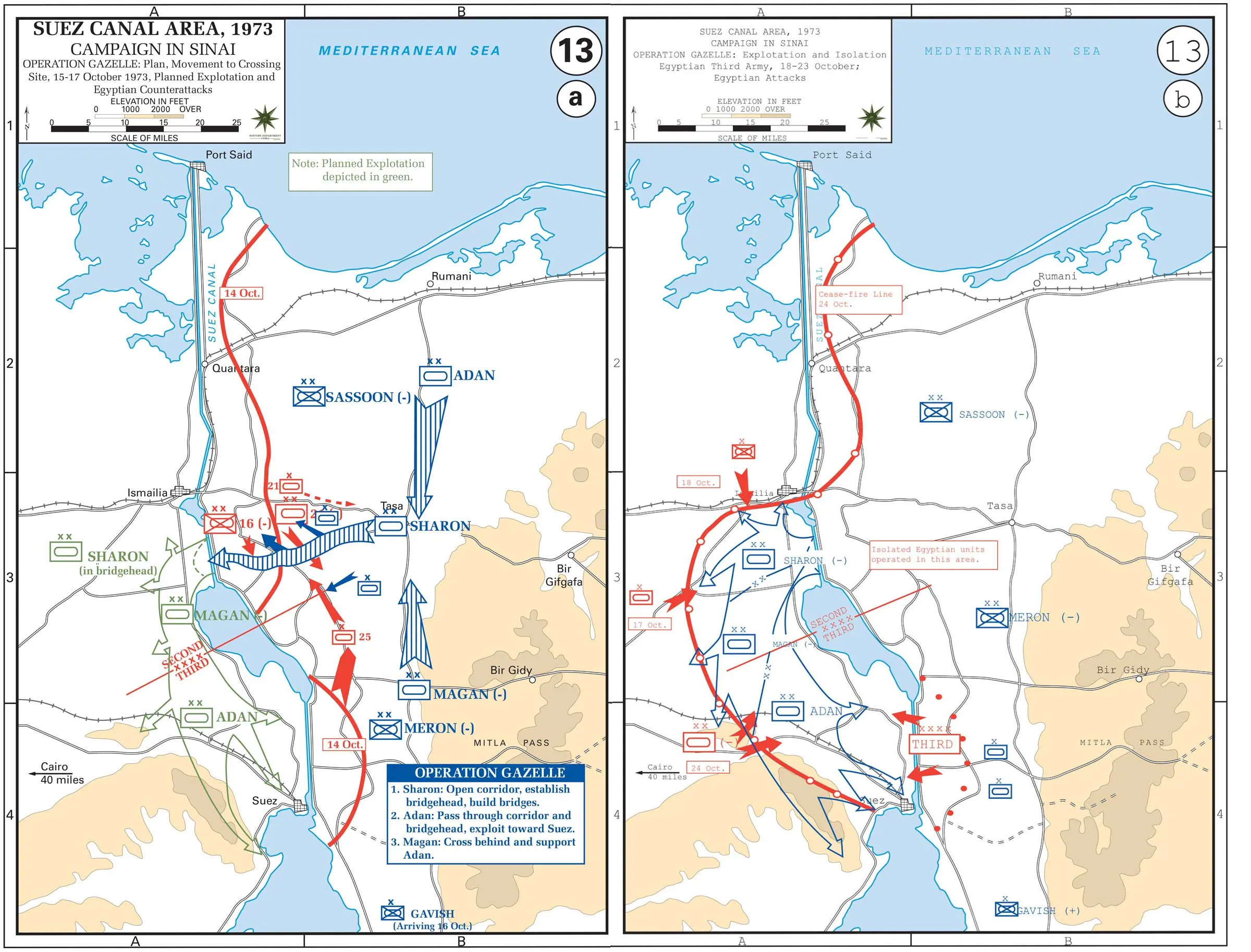
The 1973 War in the Sinai, 15–24 October

The 2nd and 3rd Armies were ordered to attack eastward in six simultaneous thrusts over a broad front, leaving behind five infantry divisions to hold the bridgeheads. The attacking forces, consisting of 800–1,000 tanks would not have SAM cover, so the Egyptian Air Force (EAF) was tasked with their defense against Israeli aerial attacks. Armored and mechanized units initiated the attack on 14 October with artillery support. They were up against 700–750 Israeli tanks.

In the event, the Egyptian armored thrust suffered heavy losses. Instead of concentrating forces of maneuvering, except for the wadi thrust, Egyptian units launched head-on-attacks against the waiting Israeli defenses. At least 250 Egyptian tanks and some 200 armored vehicles were destroyed. Egyptian casualties exceeded 1,000. Fewer than 40 Israeli tanks were hit, and all but six of them were repaired by Israeli maintenance crews and returned to service, while Israeli casualties numbered 665.

Kenneth Pollack credited a successful Israeli commando raid early on 14 October against an Egyptian signals-intercept site at Jebel Ataqah with seriously disrupting Egyptian command and control and contributing to its breakdown during the engagement. Israeli intelligence had also detected signs that the Egyptians were gearing up for a major armored thrust as early as 12 October.

=== Israeli breakthrough and crossing of the Suez Canal ===
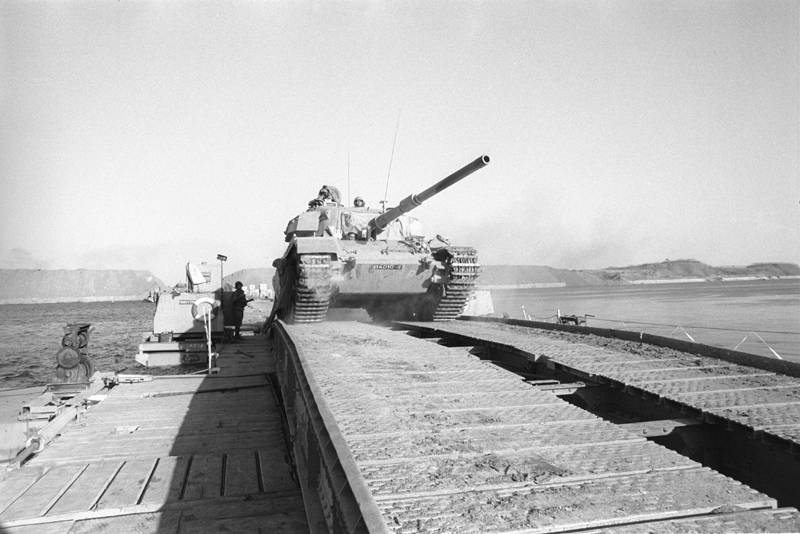
Israeli tanks crossing the Suez Canal

At this point, General Sharon advocated an immediate crossing at Deversoir at the northern edge of Great Bitter Lake. Earlier, on 9 October, a reconnaissance force attached to Colonel Amnon Reshef's Brigade had detected a gap between the Egyptian Second and Third Armies in this sector. According to General Gamasy, the gap had been spotted by an American SR-71 spy plane.

The Israelis followed the Egyptian failed attack of 14 October with a multidivisional counterattack through the gap between the Egyptian Second and Third Armies. Sharon's 143rd Division, now reinforced with a paratroop brigade commanded by Colonel Danny Matt, was tasked with establishing bridgeheads on the east and west banks of the canal. The 162nd and 252nd Armored Divisions, commanded by Generals Avraham Adan and Kalman Magen, respectively, would then cross through the breach to the west bank of the canal and swing southward, encircling the 3rd Army.

On the night of 15 October, 750 of Colonel Matt's paratroopers crossed the canal in rubber dinghies. They were soon joined by tanks, ferried on motorized rafts, and additional infantry. The force encountered no resistance initially and fanned out in raiding parties, attacking supply convoys, SAM sites, logistic centers and anything else of military value, with priority given to the SAMs. Attacks on SAM sites punched a hole in the Egyptian anti-aircraft screen and enabled the IAF to strike Egyptian ground targets more aggressively.

On the night of 15 October, 20 Israeli tanks and seven APCs under the command of Colonel Haim Erez crossed the canal and penetrated 12 kilometres (7.5 mi) into Egypt, taking the Egyptians by surprise. For the first 24 hours, Erez's force attacked SAM sites and military columns with impunity, including a major raid on Egyptian missile bases on 16 October, in which three Egyptian missile bases were destroyed, along with several tanks, for no Israeli losses. On the morning of 17 October, the force was attacked by the 23rd Egyptian Armored Brigade, but managed to repulse the attack. By this time, the Syrians no longer posed a credible threat and the Israelis were able to shift their air power to the south in support of the offensive. The combination of a weakened Egyptian SAM umbrella and a greater concentration of Israeli fighter-bombers meant that the IAF was capable of greatly increasing sorties against Egyptian military targets, including convoys, armor and airfields. The Egyptian bridges across the canal were damaged in Israeli air and artillery attacks.

Israeli jets began attacking Egyptian SAM sites and radars, prompting General Ismail to withdraw much of the Egyptians' air defense equipment. This in turn gave the IAF still greater freedom to operate in Egyptian airspace. Israeli jets also attacked and destroyed underground communication cables at Banha in the Nile Delta, forcing the Egyptians to transmit selective messages by radio, which could be intercepted. Aside from the cables at Banha, Israel refrained from attacking economic and strategic infrastructure following an Egyptian threat to retaliate against Israeli cities with Scud missiles. Israeli aircraft bombed Egyptian Scud batteries at Port Said several times.

The Egyptian Air Force attempted to interdict IAF sorties and attack Israeli ground forces, but suffered heavy losses in dogfights and from Israeli air defenses, while inflicting light aircraft losses. The heaviest air battles took place over the northern Nile Delta, where the Israelis repeatedly attempted to destroy Egyptian airbases. Although the Israelis tended to come out on top in aerial battles, one notable exception was the Air battle of Mansoura, when an Israeli raid against the Egyptian airbases of Tanta and Mansoura was repulsed by Egyptian fighter aircraft.

=== Securing the bridgehead ===
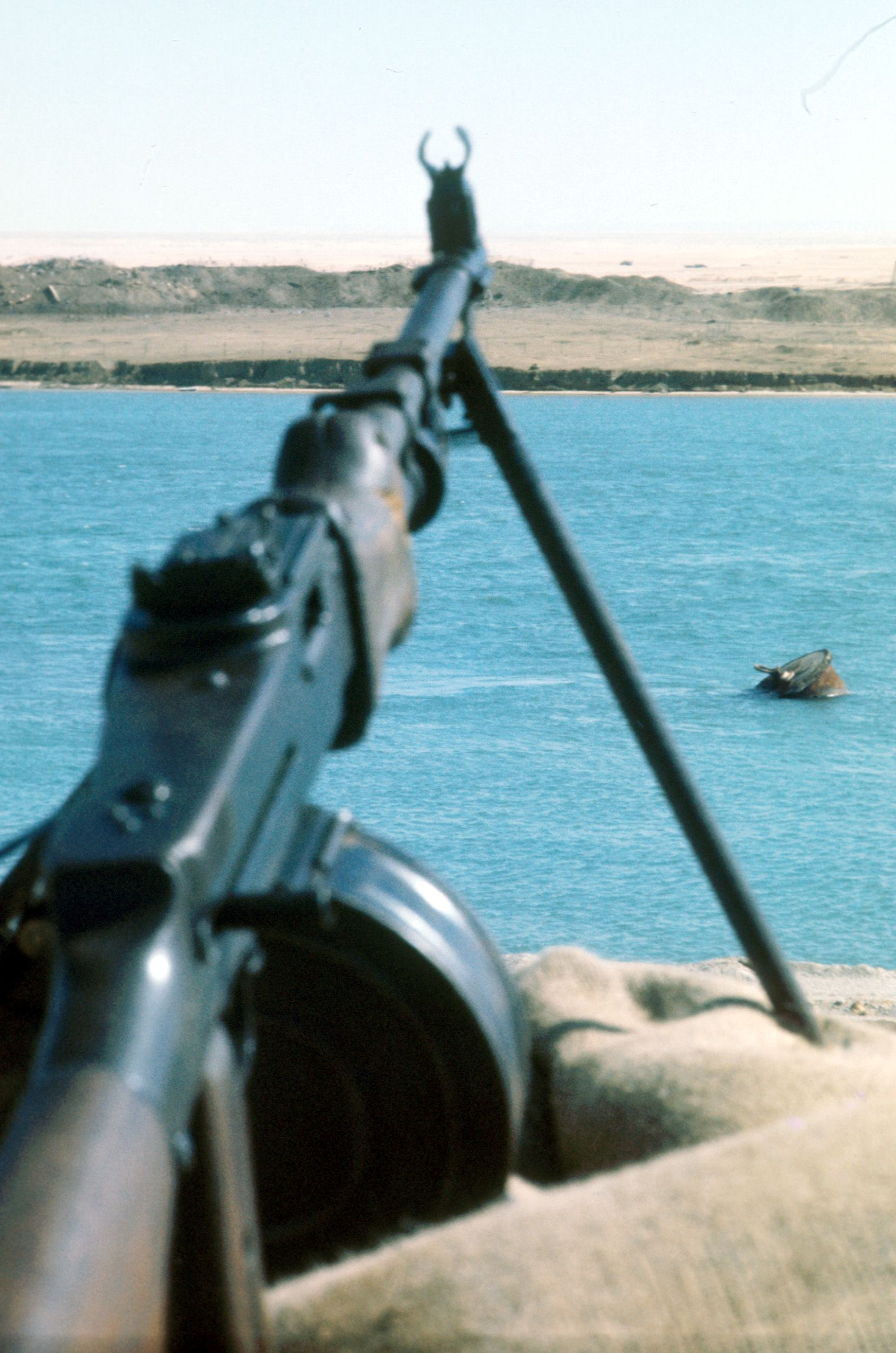
An Israeli position with captured RPD machine gun overlooks the Suez Canal on 16 October 1973

After the Israelis had secured the bridge on the west bank, Generals Bar-Lev and Elazar ordered Sharon to concentrate on securing the bridgehead on the east bank. He was ordered to clear the roads leading to the canal as well as a position known as the Chinese Farm, just north of Deversoir, the Israeli crossing point. Sharon objected and requested permission to expand and break out of the bridgehead on the west bank, arguing that such a maneuver would cause the collapse of Egyptian forces on the east bank. But the Israeli high command was insistent, believing that until the east bank was secure, forces on the west bank could be cut off. Sharon was overruled by his superiors and relented.

On 16 October, he dispatched Amnon Reshef's Brigade to attack the Chinese Farm. Other IDF forces attacked entrenched Egyptian forces overlooking the roads to the canal. After three days of bitter and close-quarters fighting, the Israelis succeeded in dislodging the numerically superior Egyptian forces. The Israelis lost about 300 dead, 1,000 wounded, and 56 tanks. The Egyptians suffered heavier casualties, including 118 tanks destroyed and 15 captured.

=== Egyptian response to the Israeli crossing ===
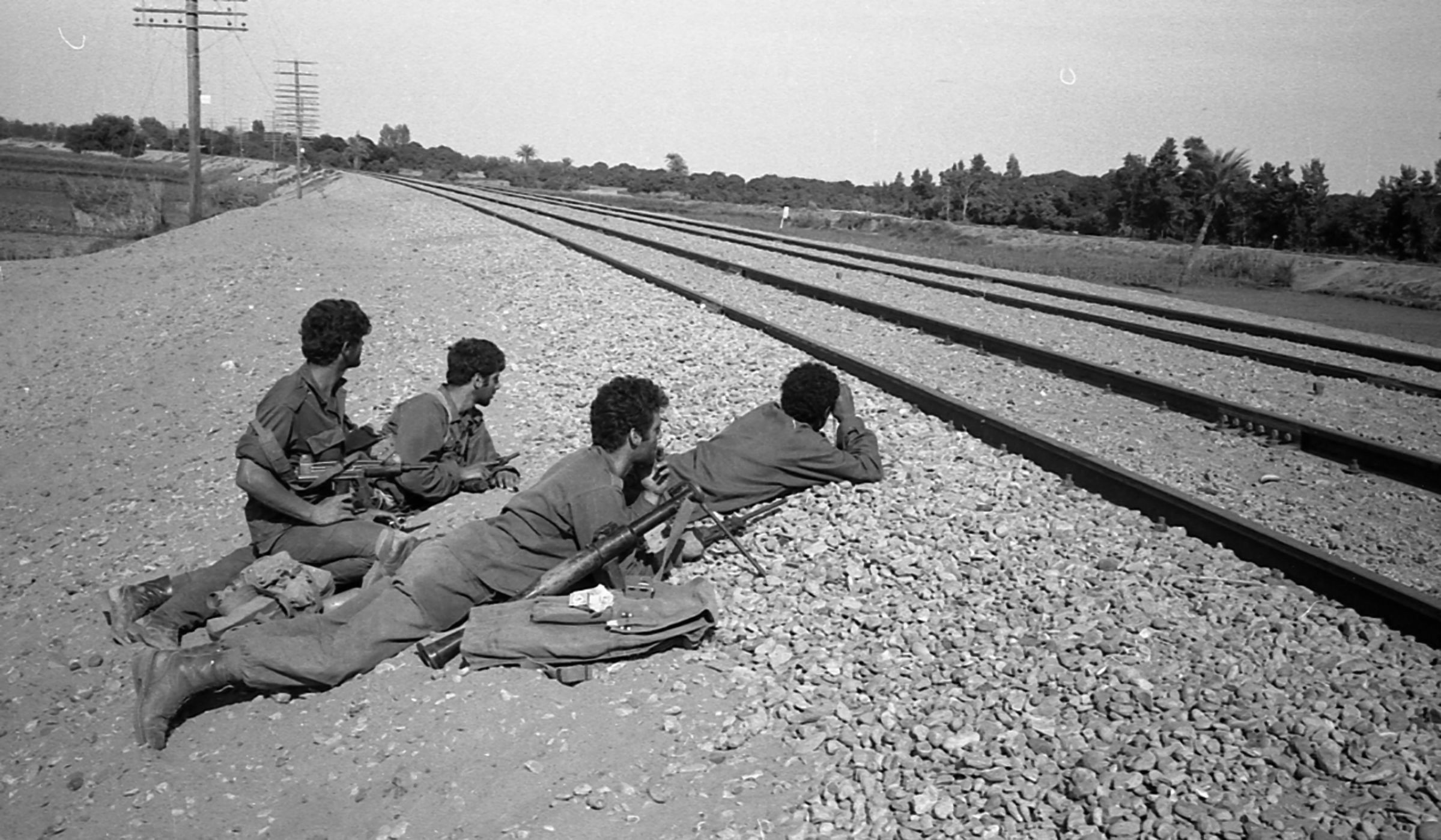
Israeli soldiers during the Battle of Ismailia. One of them has a captured Egyptian RPG-7.

The Egyptians, meanwhile, failed to grasp the extent and magnitude of the Israeli crossing, nor did they appreciate its intent and purpose. This was partly due to attempts by Egyptian field commanders to obfuscate reports concerning the Israeli crossing and partly due to a false assumption that the canal crossing was merely a diversion for a major IDF offensive targeting the right flank of the Second Army. Consequently, on 16 October General Shazly ordered the 21st Armored Division to attack southward and the T-62-equipped 25th Independent Armored Brigade to attack northward in a pincer action to eliminate the perceived threat to the Second Army.

The Egyptians failed to scout the area and were unaware that by now, Adan's 162nd Armored Division was in the vicinity. Moreover, the 21st and 25th failed to coordinate their attacks, allowing General Adan's Division to meet each force separately. Adan first concentrated his attack on the 21st Armored Division, destroying 50–60 Egyptian tanks and forcing the remainder to retreat. He then turned southward and ambushed the 25th Independent Armored Brigade, destroying 86 of its 96 tanks and all of its APCs, while losing three tanks.

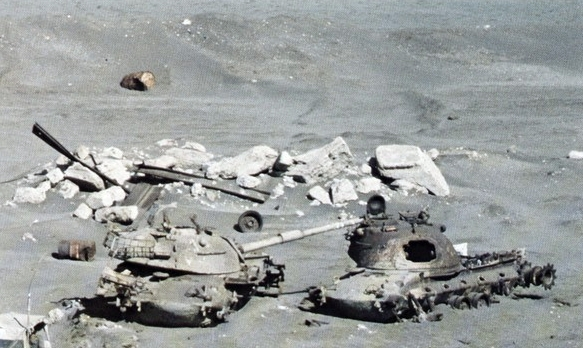
Destroyed Israeli M48 Patton tanks on the banks of the Suez Canal

Egyptian artillery shelled the Israeli bridge over the canal on the morning of 17 October, scoring several hits. The Egyptian Air Force launched repeated raids, some with up to 20 aircraft, to take out the bridge and rafts, damaging the bridge. The Egyptians had to shut down their SAM sites during these raids, allowing Israeli fighters to intercept the Egyptians. The Egyptians lost 16 planes and seven helicopters, while the Israelis lost six planes.

The bridge was damaged, and the Israeli Paratroop Headquarters, which was near the bridge, was also hit; its commander and his deputy were wounded. During the night, the bridge was repaired, but only a trickle of Israeli forces was able to cross. According to Chaim Herzog, the Egyptians continued attacking the bridgehead until the ceasefire, using artillery and mortars to fire tens of thousands of shells into the area of the crossing. Egyptian aircraft attempted to bomb the bridge every day, and helicopters launched suicide missions, making attempts to drop barrels of napalm on the bridge and bridgehead.

The bridges were damaged multiple times, and had to be repaired at night. The attacks caused heavy casualties, and many tanks were sunk when their rafts were hit. Egyptian commandos and frogmen with armored support launched a ground attack against the bridgehead, which was repulsed with the loss of 10 tanks. Two subsequent Egyptian counterattacks were also beaten back.

After the failure of the 17 October counterattacks, the Egyptian General Staff slowly began to realize the magnitude of the Israeli offensive. Early on 18 October, the Soviets showed Sadat satellite imagery of Israeli forces operating on the west bank. Alarmed, Sadat dispatched Shazly to the front to assess the situation first-hand. He no longer trusted his field commanders to provide accurate reports. Shazly confirmed that the Israelis had at least one division on the west bank and were widening their bridgehead. He advocated withdrawing most of Egypt's armor from the east bank to confront the growing Israeli threat on the west bank. Sadat rejected this recommendation outright and even threatened Shazly with a court martial. Ahmad Ismail Ali recommended that Sadat push for a ceasefire so as to prevent the Israelis from exploiting their successes.

=== Israeli forces across the Suez ===
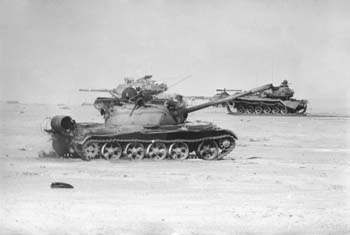
A knocked-out Egyptian tank

Israeli forces were by now pouring across the canal on two bridges, including one of Israeli design, and motorized rafts. Israeli engineers under Brigadier-General Dan Even had worked under heavy Egyptian fire to set up the bridges, and over 100 Israelis were killed and hundreds more wounded. The crossing was difficult because of Egyptian artillery fire, though by 4:00 am, two of Adan's brigades were on the west bank of the canal. On the morning of 18 October, Sharon's forces on the west bank launched an offensive toward Ismailia, slowly pushing back the Egyptian paratroop brigade occupying the sand rampart northward to enlarge the bridgehead. Some of his units attempted to move west, but were stopped at the crossroads in Nefalia. Adan's division rolled south toward Suez City while Magen's division pushed west toward Cairo and south toward Adabiya.

On 19 October, one of Sharon's brigades continued to push the Egyptian paratroopers north towards Ismailia until the Israelis were within 8 or 10 km (5 or 6 mi) of the city. Sharon hoped to seize the city and thereby sever the logistical and supply lines for most of the Egyptian Second Army. Sharon's second brigade began to cross the canal. The brigade's forward elements moved to the Abu Sultan Camp, from where they moved north to take Orcha, an Egyptian logistics base defended by a commando battalion. Israeli infantrymen cleared the trenches and bunkers, often engaging in hand-to-hand combat, as tanks moved alongside them and fired into the trench sections to their front. The position was secured before nightfall. More than 300 Egyptians were killed and 50 taken prisoner, while the Israelis lost 16 dead.

The fall of Orcha caused the collapse of the Egyptian defensive line, allowing more Israeli troops to get onto the sand rampart. There, they were able to fire in support of Israeli troops facing Missouri Ridge, an Egyptian-occupied position on the Bar-Lev Line that could pose a threat to the Israeli crossing. On the same day, Israeli paratroopers participating in Sharon's drive pushed the Egyptians back far enough for the Israeli bridges to be out of sight of Egyptian artillery observers, though the Egyptians continued shelling the area.

As the Israelis pushed towards Ismailia, the Egyptians fought a delaying battle, retreating into defensive positions further north as they came under increasing pressure from the Israeli ground offensive, coupled with airstrikes. On 21 October, one of Sharon's brigades was occupying the city's outskirts, but facing fierce resistance from Egyptian paratroopers and commandos. The same day, Sharon's last remaining unit on the east bank attacked Missouri Ridge. Shmuel Gonen had demanded Sharon capture the position, and Sharon had reluctantly ordered the attack. The assault was preceded by an air attack that caused hundreds of Egyptian soldiers to flee and thousands of others to dig in.

One Israeli battalion then attacked from the south, destroying 20 tanks and overrunning infantry positions before being halted by Sagger missiles and minefields. Another battalion attacked from the southwest and inflicted heavy losses on the Egyptians, but its advance was halted after eight Israeli tanks were knocked out by the Egyptians. The surviving Israeli soldiers managed to hold off an Egyptian infantry assault while losing two soldiers before surrendering. Two of the Israeli soldiers managed to hide and escape back to Israeli lines. The Israelis managed to occupy one-third of Missouri Ridge. Defense Minister Moshe Dayan countermanded orders from Sharon's superiors to continue the attack. However, the Israelis continued to expand their holdings on the east bank. According to the Israelis, the IDF bridgehead was 40 km (25 mi) wide and 32 km (20 mi) deep by the end of 21 October.

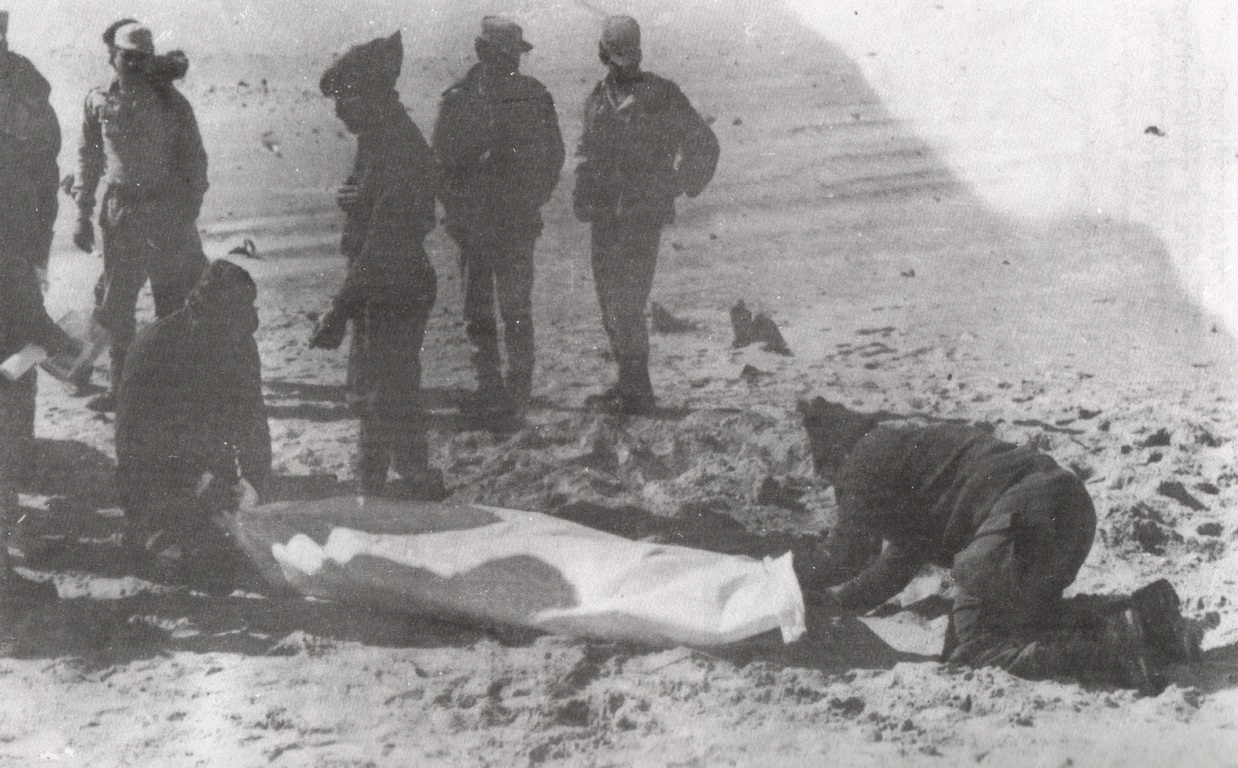
Egyptian soldiers gather the bodies of Israeli soldiers killed during the Battle of Ismailia.

On 22 October, Ismailia's Egyptian defenders were occupying their last line of defense. At around 10:00 am, the Israelis renewed the attack, moving toward Jebel Mariam, Abu 'Atwa and Nefisha. The Egyptian paratroopers at Jebel Mariam became engaged in intense fighting but, with their advantageous position, were able to repel the attack by late afternoon. Meanwhile, the Israelis concentrated artillery and mortar fire against the Egyptian Sa'iqa forces positions at Abu 'Atwa and Nefisha. At noon, advance Israeli elements engaged with a Sa'iqa reconnaissance unit, and the Israelis lost two tanks and a half-track. At 1:00 pm, an Israeli paratrooper company attacked Abu 'Atwa without first scouting ahead, and was ambushed and annihilated by the Egyptians. The attack ended after Israeli paratroopers suffered over fifty casualties and lost four tanks.

At the same time, two tank companies and mechanized infantry attacked Nefisha, supported with close air support. The Egyptian Sa'iqa commando battalion in charge of Nefisha managed to repel the attack after prolonged, heavy fighting that closed to very short distances. The Israelis lost three tanks, two half-tracks, and a large number of men. For their part the Sa'iqa commandos at Nefisha lost 24 killed, including four officers, and 42 wounded, including three officers. Edgar O'Ballance mentions a counterattack by the Egyptian Sa'iqa which took place during the afternoon and pushed some of Sharon's Israeli troops back along the Sweetwater Canal. The Israeli attack had been thoroughly routed.

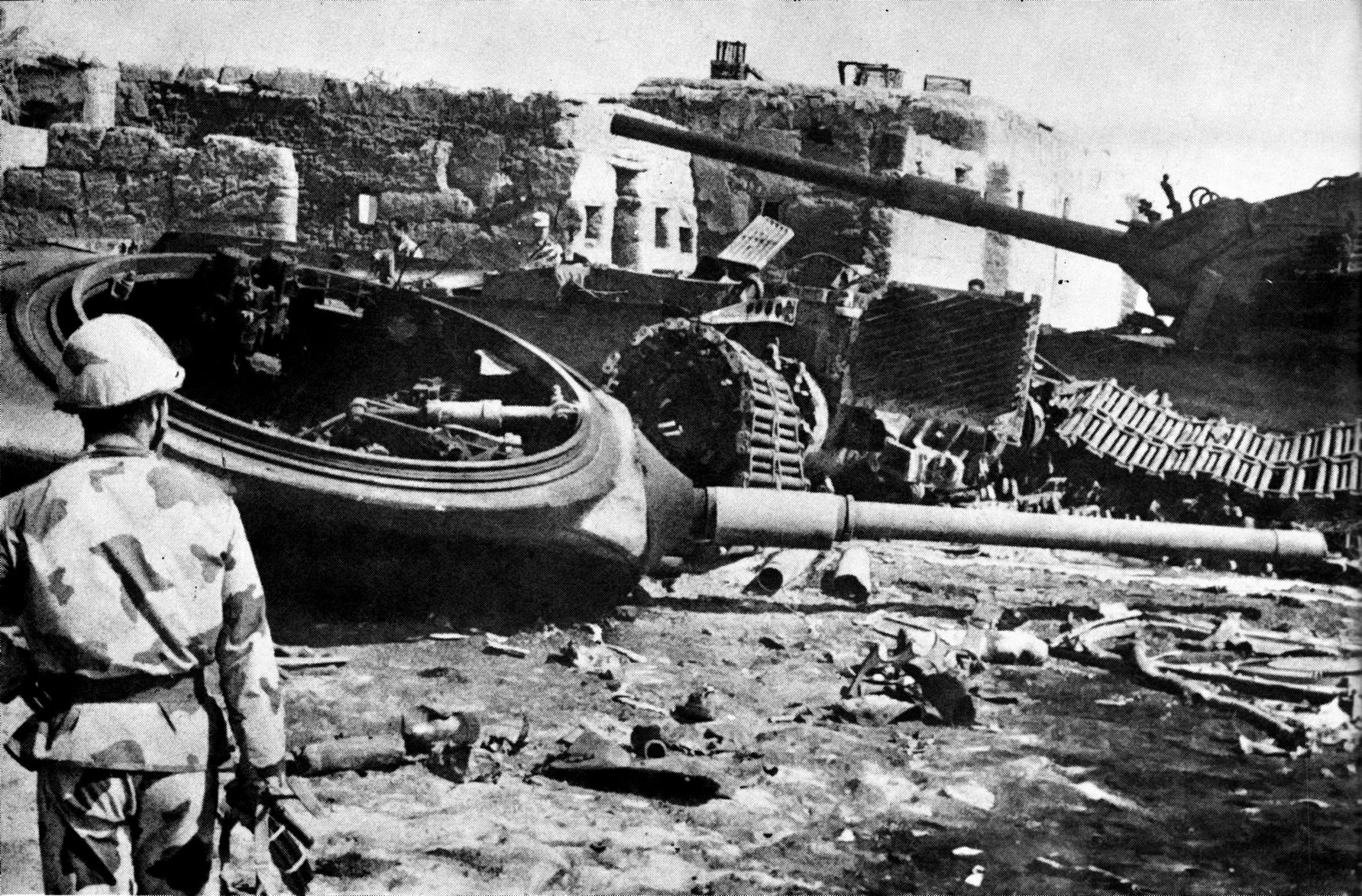
An Egyptian soldier looks at a group of knocked out Israeli Patton tanks.

Israeli forces failed to get behind Ismailia and encircle the city. The Israeli advance on Ismailia was stopped 10 km (6 mi) south of the city. The IDF failed to cut supplies for the Egyptian Second Army or to occupy Ismailia. The Egyptians registered a tactical and strategic victory in the defense of Ismailia, stopping an encirclement of their large forces on the east bank of the Suez Canal and ensuring their supply lines remained open.

On the northern front, the Israelis also attacked Port Said, facing Egyptian troops and a 900-strong Tunisian unit, who fought a defensive battle. According to the Egyptian government, the city was repeatedly bombed by Israeli jets, and hundreds of civilians were killed or wounded.

Adan and Magen moved south, decisively defeating the Egyptians in a series of engagements, though they often encountered determined Egyptian resistance, and both sides suffered heavy casualties. Adan advanced towards the Sweetwater Canal area, planning to break out into the surrounding desert and hit the Geneifa Hills, where many SAM sites were located. Adan's three armored brigades fanned out, with one advancing through the Geneifa Hills, another along a parallel road south of them, and the third advancing towards Mina. Adan's brigades met resistance from dug-in Egyptian forces in the Sweetwater Canal area's greenbelt. Adan's other brigades were also held by a line of Egyptian military camps and installations. Adan was also harassed by the Egyptian Air Force.

The Israelis slowly advanced, bypassing Egyptian positions whenever possible. After being denied air support due to the presence of two SAM batteries that had been brought forward, Adan sent two brigades to attack them. The brigades slipped past the dug-in Egyptian infantry, moving out from the greenbelt for more than 8 km (5 mi), and fought off multiple Egyptian counterattacks. From a distance of 4 km (2 1/2 mi), they shelled and destroyed the SAMs, allowing the IAF to provide Adan with close air support. Adan's troops advanced through the greenbelt and fought their way to the Geneifa Hills, clashing with scattered Egyptian, Kuwaiti and Palestinian troops. The Israelis clashed with an Egyptian armored unit at Mitzeneft and destroyed multiple SAM sites. Adan also captured Fayid Airport, which was subsequently prepared by Israeli crews to serve as a supply base and to fly out wounded soldiers.

Sixteen kilometres (10 mi) west of the Bitter Lake, Colonel Natke Nir's brigade overran an Egyptian artillery brigade that had been participating in the shelling of the Israeli bridgehead. Scores of Egyptian artillerymen were killed and many more taken prisoner. Two Israeli soldiers were also killed, including the son of General Moshe Gidron. Meanwhile, Magen's division moved west and then south, covering Adan's flank and eventually moving south of Suez City to the Gulf of Suez.

=== The ceasefire and further battles ===
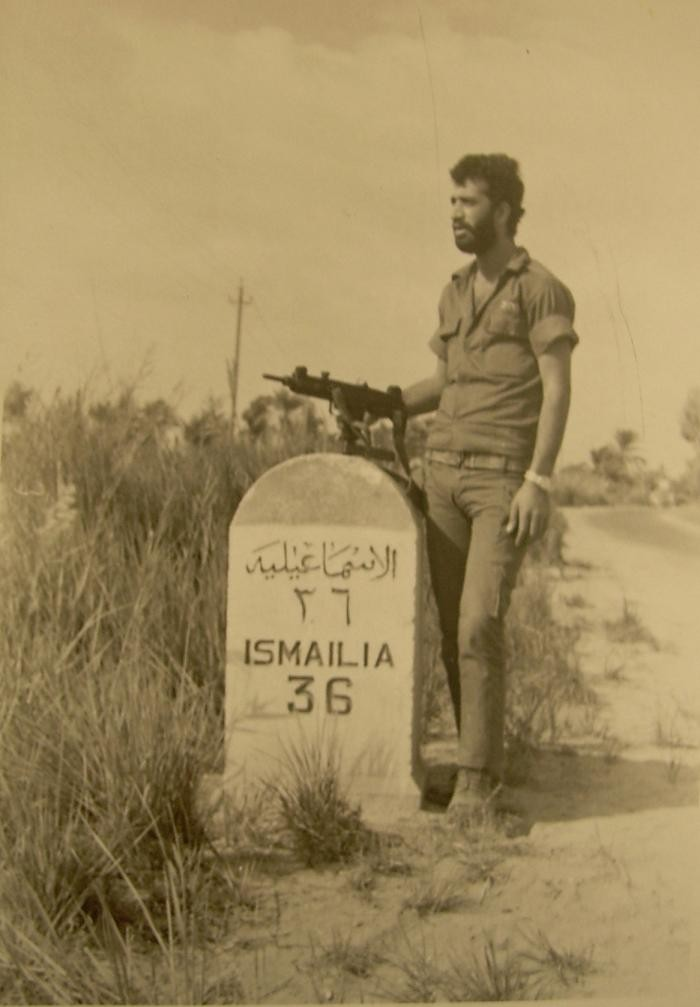
An Israeli soldier on the road to Ismailia

The United Nations Security Council passed (14–0) Resolution 338 calling for a ceasefire, largely negotiated between the U.S. and Soviet Union, on 22 October. It called upon the belligerents to immediately cease all military activity. The cease-fire was to come into effect 12 hours later at 6:52 pm Israeli time. Because this was after dark, it was impossible for satellite surveillance to determine where the front lines were when the fighting was supposed to stop. U.S. Secretary of State Henry Kissinger intimated to Prime Minister Meir that he would not object to offensive action during the night before the ceasefire was to come into effect.

Several minutes before the ceasefire came into effect, three Scud missiles were fired at Israeli targets by either Egyptian forces or Soviet personnel in Egypt. This was the first combat use of Scud missiles. One Scud targeted the port of Arish and two targeted the Israeli bridgehead on the Suez Canal. One hit an Israeli supply convoy and killed seven soldiers. When the time for the ceasefire arrived, Sharon's division had failed to capture Ismailia and cut off the Second Army's supply lines, but Israeli forces were just a few hundred metres short of their southern goal—the last road linking Cairo and Suez.

Adan's drive south had left Israeli and Egyptian units scattered throughout the battlefield, with no clear lines between them. As Egyptian and Israeli units tried to regroup, regular firefights broke out. During the night, Elazar reported that the Egyptians were attacking in an attempt to regain land at various locations, and that nine Israeli tanks had been destroyed. He asked permission from Dayan to respond to the attacks and Dayan agreed. Israel then resumed its drive south.

It is unclear which side fired first but Israeli field commanders used the skirmishes as justification to resume the attacks. When Sadat protested alleged Israeli truce violations, Israel said that Egyptian troops had fired first. William B. Quandt noted that regardless of who fired the first post-ceasefire shot, it was the Israeli Army that was advancing beyond the 22 October ceasefire lines.

Adan resumed his attack on 23 October. Israeli troops finished the drive south, captured the last ancillary road south of the port of Suez, and encircled the Egyptian Third Army east of the Suez Canal. The Israelis then transported enormous amounts of military equipment across the canal, which Egypt claimed was in violation of the ceasefire. Egyptian aircraft launched repeated attacks in support of the Third Army, sometimes in groups of up to 30 planes, but took severe losses.

=== Battle of Suez ===
Israeli armor and paratroopers also entered Suez in an attempt to capture the city, but failed after being confronted by Egyptian soldiers and hastily raised local militia forces. They were surrounded and the armored column was ambushed and severely hit, while the paratroopers came under heavy fire and many of them became trapped inside a local building. The armored column and part of the infantry force were evacuated during the day, while the main contingent of the paratrooper force eventually managed to dash out of the city and make their way back to Israeli lines. The Israelis had lost 80 dead and 120 wounded, with minimal Egyptian casualties, for no tactical gain. Israel made two more probes into Suez, one on the 25th and one on the 28th, but both were repulsed.

=== Egypt's trapped Third Army ===
Kissinger found out about the Third Army's encirclement shortly thereafter. Kissinger considered that the situation presented the United States with a tremendous opportunity and that Egypt was dependent on the United States to prevent Israel from destroying its trapped army. The position could be parlayed later into allowing the United States to mediate in the dispute and wean Egypt from Soviet influence. As a result, the United States exerted tremendous pressure on the Israelis to refrain from destroying the trapped army, even threatening to support a UN resolution demanding that the Israelis withdraw to their 22 October positions if they did not allow non-military supplies to reach the army. In a phone call with Israeli ambassador Simcha Dinitz, Kissinger told the ambassador that the destruction of the Egyptian Third Army "is an option that does not exist."

The Israeli government also had its own motivations for not destroying the Third Army. These included the possibility of using the encircled Third Army as a bargaining chip for ending the Egyptian blockade of the Bab-el-Mandel Straits in the Red Sea and negotiating a repatriation of Israeli prisoners-of-war captured by Egypt. The exhausted state of the IDF, the possibility that humiliating Egypt by destroying the Third Army would make Sadat more bellicose and unwilling to cease hostilities, and Israel's intense fears that the Soviet Union would militarily intervene in the event the Third Army was destroyed were additional reasons for Israel ultimately deciding against destroying it.

Despite being surrounded, the Third Army managed to maintain its combat integrity east of the canal and keep up its defensive positions, to the surprise of many. According to Trevor N. Dupuy, the Israelis, Soviets and Americans overestimated the vulnerability of the Third Army at the time. It was not on the verge of collapse, and he wrote that while a renewed Israeli offensive would probably overcome it, this was not a certainty.

David T. Buckwalter agrees that despite the isolation of the Third Army, it was unclear if the Israelis could have protected their forces on the west bank of the canal from a determined Egyptian assault and still maintain sufficient strength along the rest of the front. This assessment was challenged by Patrick Seale, who stated that the Third Army was "on the brink of collapse". Seale's position was supported by P.R. Kumaraswamy, who wrote that intense American pressure prevented the Israelis from annihilating the stranded Third Army.

Herzog noted that given the Third Army's desperate situation, in terms of being cut off from re-supply and reassertion of Israeli air superiority, the destruction of the Third Army was inevitable and could have been achieved within a very brief period. Shazly himself described the Third Army's plight as "desperate" and classified its encirclement as a "catastrophe that was too big to hide". He further noted that, "the fate of the Egyptian Third Army was in the hands of Israel. Once the Third Army was encircled by Israeli troops every bit of bread to be sent to our men was paid for by meeting Israeli demands."

Shortly before the ceasefire came into effect, an Israeli tank battalion advanced into Adabiya, and took it with support from the Israeli Navy. Some 1,500 Egyptian prisoners were taken, and about a hundred Egyptian soldiers assembled just south of Adabiya, where they held out against the Israelis. The Israelis also conducted their third and final incursion into Suez. They made some gains, but failed to break into the city center. As a result, the city was partitioned down the main street, with the Egyptians holding the city center and the Israelis controlling the outskirts, port installations and oil refinery, effectively surrounding the Egyptian defenders.

=== Post-war battles ===
On the morning of 26 October, the Egyptian Third Army violated the ceasefire by attempting to break through the surrounding Israeli forces. The attack was repulsed by Israeli air and ground forces. The Egyptians also made minor gains in attacks against Sharon's forces in the Ismailia area. The Israelis reacted by bombing and shelling priority targets in Egypt, including command posts and water reserves. The front was quieter in the Second Army's sector in the northern canal area, where both sides generally respected the ceasefire.

Though most heavy fighting ended on 28 October, the fighting never stopped until 18 January 1974. Israeli Defense Minister Moshe Dayan stated that:

The cease-fire existed on paper, but the continued firing along the front was not the only characteristic of the situation between 24 October 1973 and 18 January 1974. This intermediate period also held the ever-present possibility of a renewal of full-scale war. There were three variations on how it might break out, two Egyptian and one Israeli. One Egyptian plan was to attack Israeli units west of the canal from the direction of Cairo. The other was to cut off the Israeli canal bridgehead by a link-up of the Second and Third Armies on the east bank. Both plans were based on massive artillery pounding of Israeli forces, who were not well fortified and who would suffer heavy casualties. It was therefore thought that Israel would withdraw from the west bank, since she was most sensitive on the subject of soldiers' lives. Egypt, at the time had a total of 1,700 first-line tanks on both sides of the canal front, 700 on the east bank and 1,000 on the west bank. Also on the west bank, in the second line, were an additional 600 tanks for the defense of Cairo. She had some 2,000 artillery pieces, about 500 operational aircraft, and at least 130 SAM missile batteries positioned around our forces so as to deny us air support.

The IDF acknowledged the loss of 14 soldiers during this postwar period. Egyptian losses were higher, especially in the sector controlled by Ariel Sharon, who ordered his troops to respond with massive firepower to any Egyptian provocation. Some aerial battles took place, and the Israelis also shot down several helicopters attempting to resupply the Third Army.

=== Final situation on the Egyptian front ===
By the end of the war, the Israelis had advanced to positions some 101 kilometres from Egypt's capital, Cairo, and occupied 1,600 square kilometres west of the Suez Canal. They had also cut the Cairo–Suez road and encircled the bulk of Egypt's Third Army. The Israelis had also taken many prisoners after Egyptian soldiers, including many officers, began surrendering in masses towards the end of the war. The Egyptians held a narrow strip on the east bank of the canal, occupying some 1,200 square kilometres of the Sinai. One source estimated that the Egyptians had 70,000 men, 720 tanks and 994 artillery pieces on the east bank of the canal. However, 30,000 to 45,000 of them were now encircled by the Israelis.

Despite Israel's counterattack west of the canal, the Egyptian military was reformed and organized. Consequently, according to Gamasy, the Israeli military position became "weak" for different reasons:

One, Israel now had a large force (about six or seven brigades) in a very limited area of land, surrounded from all sides either by natural or man-made barriers, or by the Egyptian forces. This put it in a weak position. Moreover, there were the difficulties in supplying this force, in evacuating it, in the lengthy communication lines, and in the daily attrition in men and equipment. Two, to protect these troops, the Israeli command had to allocate other forces (four or five brigades) to defend the entrances to the breach at the Deversoir. Three, to immobilize the Egyptian bridgeheads in Sinai the Israeli command had to allocate ten brigades to face the Second and Third army bridgeheads. In addition, it became necessary to keep the strategic reserves at their maximum state of alert. Thus, Israel was obliged to keep its armed force—and consequently the country—mobilized for a long period, at least until the war came to an end, because the ceasefire did not signal the end of the war. There is no doubt that this was in total conflict with its military theories.

Egypt wished to end the war when it realized that the IDF canal crossing offensive could result in a catastrophe. The Egyptians' besieged Third Army could not hold on without supply. The Israeli Army advanced to 100 km from Cairo, which worried Egypt. However, claims that Israel would be able to reach Cairo are largely exaggerated. By the end of the 1973 Yom Kippur War, despite Israeli forces crossing the Suez Canal, Egypt maintained significant armored reserves west of the Canal. Several mechanized and armored divisions, positioned around Cairo and Fayid, were prepared to counter any Israeli advance. The presence of these forces, along with Egyptian air defenses, prevented further Israeli penetration toward Cairo.

== Golan front ==
=== Initial Syrian attacks ===
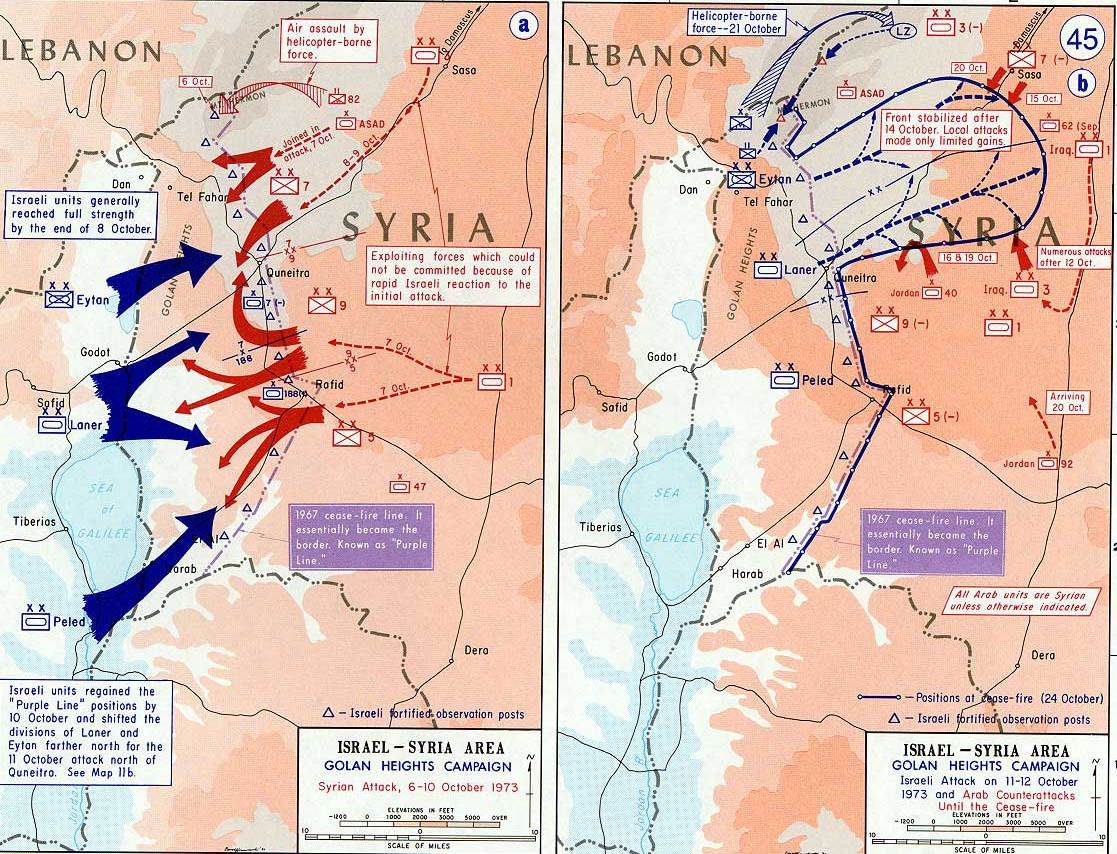
A map of the fighting on the Golan Heights

In the Golan Heights, the Syrians attacked two Israeli armored brigades, an infantry brigade, two paratrooper battalions and eleven artillery batteries with five divisions (the 7th, 9th and 5th, with the 1st and 3rd in reserve) and 188 batteries. At the onset of the battle, the Israeli brigades of some 3,000 troops, 180 tanks and 60 artillery pieces faced off against three infantry divisions with large armor components comprising 28,000 Syrian troops, 800 tanks and 600 artillery pieces. In addition, the Syrians deployed two armored divisions from the second day onwards.

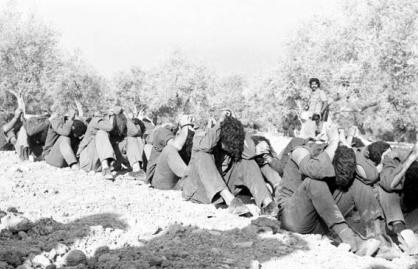
Israeli soldiers, captured by the Syrian Army

To fight the opening phase of a possible battle, before reserves arrived, Israeli high command had, conforming to the original plan, allocated a single armored brigade, the 188th, accepting a disparity in tank numbers of eighteen to one. When the warning by King Hussein of an imminent Syrian attack was conveyed, Elazar at first only assigned two additional tank companies from 7th Armored Brigade: "We'll have one hundred tanks against their eight hundred. That ought to be enough". Eventually, his deputy, Israel Tal, ordered the entire 7th Armored Brigade to be brought up.

Efforts had been made to improve the Israeli defensive position. The "Purple Line" ran along a series of low dormant volcanic cones, "tels", in the north and deep ravines in the south. It was covered by a continuous tank ditch, bunker complexes and dense minefields. Directly west of this line a series of tank ramps were constructed: earthen platforms on which a Centurion tank could position itself with only its upper turret and gun visible, offering a substantial advantage when duelling the fully exposed enemy tanks.

The Syrians began their attack at 14:00 with an airstrike by about a hundred aircraft and a fifty-minute artillery barrage. The two forward infantry brigades, with an organic tank battalion, of each of the three infantry divisions then crossed the cease-fire lines, bypassing United Nations observer posts. They were covered by mobile anti-aircraft batteries, and equipped with bulldozers to fill-in anti-tank ditches, bridge-layer tanks to overcome obstacles and mine-clearance vehicles. These engineering vehicles were priority targets for Israeli tank gunners and took heavy losses, but Syrian infantry at points demolished the tank ditch, allowing their armor to cross.

At 14:45, two hundred men from the Syrian 82nd Paratrooper Battalion descended on foot from Mount Hermon and around 17:00 took the Israeli observation base on the southern slope, with its advanced surveillance equipment. A small force dropped by four helicopters simultaneously placed itself on the access road south of the base. Specialised intelligence personnel were captured. Made to believe that Israel had fallen, they disclosed much sensitive information. A first Israeli attempt on 8 October to retake the base from the south was ambushed and beaten off with heavy losses.

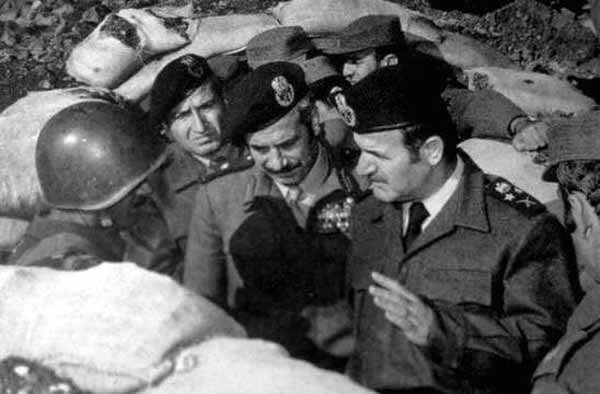
President Hafez al-Assad (right) with soldiers, 1973

During the afternoon 7th Armored Brigade was still kept in reserve and the 188th Armored Brigade held the frontline with only two tank battalions, the 74th in the north and the 53rd in the south. The northern battalion waged an exemplary defensive battle against the forward brigades of the Syrian 7th Infantry Division, destroying fifty-nine Syrian tanks for minimal losses. The southern battalion destroyed a similar number, but facing four Syrian tank battalions from two divisions had a dozen of its own tanks knocked out. At bunker complex 111, opposite Kudne in Syria, the defending company beat off "determined" and "bravely" pressed attacks by the Syrian 9th Infantry Division; by nightfall it was reduced to three tanks, with only sixty-nine anti-tank rounds between them. Further successful resistance by the southern battalion was contingent on reinforcements.

Direct operational command of the Golan had at first been given to the 188 AB commander, Yitzhak Ben-Shoham, who ordered the 7th AB to concentrate at Wasset. The 7th AB commander, Avigdor Ben-Gal, resented obeying an officer of equal rank and went to the Northern Command headquarters at Nafah, announcing he would place his force in the northern sector at the "Quneitra Gap", a pass south of the Hermonit peak and the main access to the Golan Heights from the east. Northern Command was in the process of moving their headquarters to Safed in Galilee and the senior staff officers were absent at this moment, having expected the Syrian attack to start at 18:00. Operations officer Lieutenant-Colonel Uri Simhoni therefore improvised an allocation of the tactical reserves, thereby largely deciding the course of the battle.

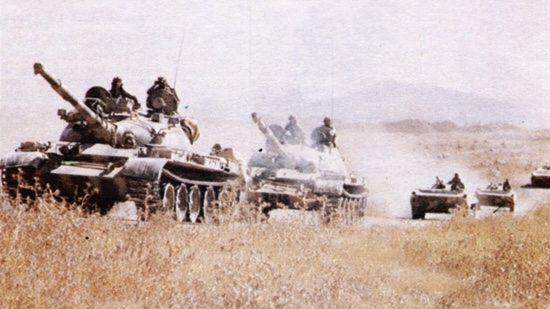
A Syrian tank column advancing in the Golan Heights

The Armored School Centurion Tank Battalion (71st TB) was kept in general reserve. The 77th Tank Battalion of 7th AB was sent to Quneitra. Two companies of the 75th Mechanised Infantry Battalion, arrived in the morning, of the same brigade were sent to the southern sector. Also 82nd TB had to reinforce the south. However, Ben-Gal had split off a company of this battalion to serve as a reserve for his own brigade. Another company, soon after arriving in the south, was ambushed by an infiltrated Syrian commando force armed with Sagger missiles and almost entirely wiped out. As a result, effective reinforcement of the southern Golan sector was limited to just a single tank company.

At 16:00, Yitzhak Hofi, head Northern Command, shortly visited Nafah and split command of the Golan front: the north would be the responsibility of 7th AB, to which 53rd TB would be transferred. Command of 188th AB would be limited to the south, taking over 82nd TB. The first wave of the Syrian offensive had failed to penetrate, but at nightfall a second, larger, wave was launched. For this purpose each of the three infantry divisions, also committing their organic mechanised brigade with forty tanks, had been reinforced by an armored brigade of about ninety tanks. Two of these brigades were to attack the northern sector, four the southern sector.

=== Defense of the Quneitra Gap ===
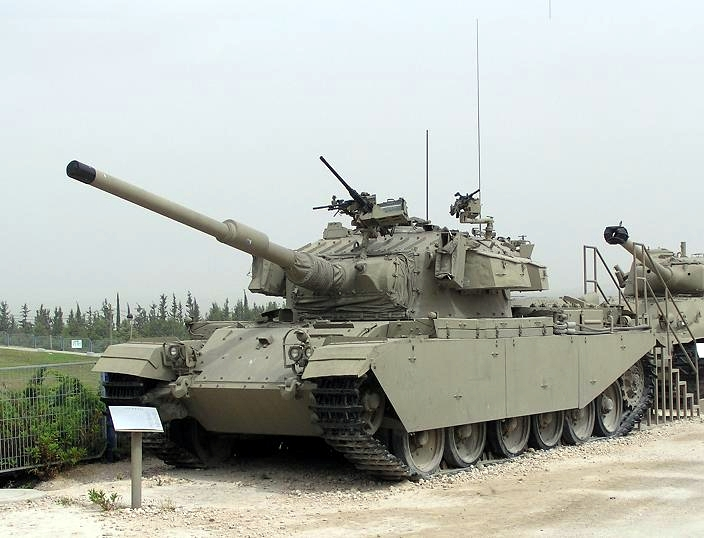
An Israeli Centurion tank. It was considered in many respects superior to the Soviet T-54/55.

Over four days of fighting, the 7th Armored Brigade in the north under Avigdor Ben-Gal managed to hold the rocky hill line defending the northern flank of their headquarters in Nafah, inflicting heavy losses on the Syrians. During the night of 6/7 October it beat off an attack of the Syrian 78th Armoured Brigade, attached to the 7th Infantry Division. On 7 October, 7th AB had to send part of its reserves to the collapsing southern sector. Replenishment from the Nafah matériel stock became impossible. Syrian High Command, understanding that forcing the Quneitra Gap would ensure a total victory on the Golan, decided to commit its strategic armored reserves.

During the night of 7/8 October, the independent 81st Armored Brigade, equipped with modern T-62s and part of the presidential guard, attacked but was beaten off. After this fight, the Israeli brigade would refer to the gap as the "Valley of Tears". Syrian Brigadier-General Omar Abrash, commander of the 7th Infantry Division, was killed on 8 October when his command tank was hit as he was preparing an attempt by 121st Mechanised Brigade to bypass the gap through a more southern route.

Having practiced on the Golan Heights numerous times, Israeli gunners made effective use of mobile artillery. During night attacks, however, the Syrian tanks had the advantage of active-illumination infrared night-vision equipment, which was not a standard Israeli equipment. Instead, some Israeli tanks were fitted with large xenon searchlights which were useful in illuminating and locating enemy positions, troops and vehicles. The close distances during night engagements negated the usual Israeli superiority in long-range duels. 77th Tank Battalion commander Avigdor Kahalani in the Quneitra Gap generally managed to hold a second tank ramp line.

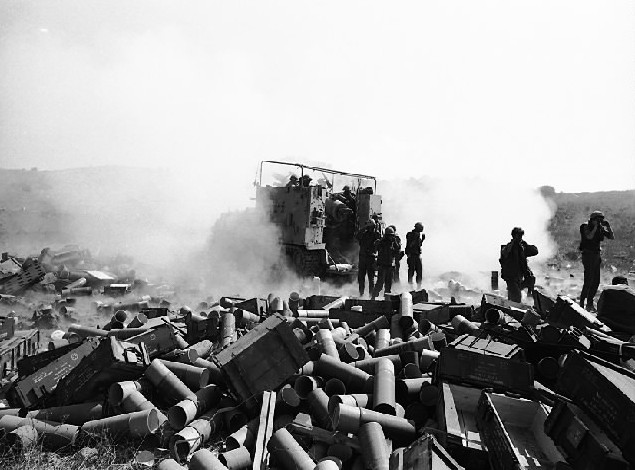
Israeli artillery pounds Syrian forces near the Valley of Tears

In the afternoon of 9 October, Syrian command committed the Republican Guard independent 70th Armored Brigade, equipped with T-62s and BMP-1s. To hold the gap, 7th AB could by now muster only some two dozen tanks, elements from the 77th, 74th, 82nd and 71st Tank Battalion. Israeli command had directed all reserves to the threatened southern sector, trusting that the northern sector was secure. Fighting in daylight proved to be advantageous to the Syrians: the better armored T-62s were hard to destroy at long range and their high-velocity 115 mm U-5TS smoothbore guns were quite accurate at medium ranges, despite the lack of a rangefinder.

Taking losses and hit by an intense artillery barrage, the Israeli Centurions withdrew from their tank ramps. The situation was restored by an ad hoc force of thirteen tanks formed by Lt. Col. Yossi Ben-Hanan from repaired vehicles and stray crews. The Syrians abandoned their last breakthrough attempt, having lost since 6 October some 260 tanks in the Quneitra Gap.

=== Syrian breakthrough in the Southern Golan ===
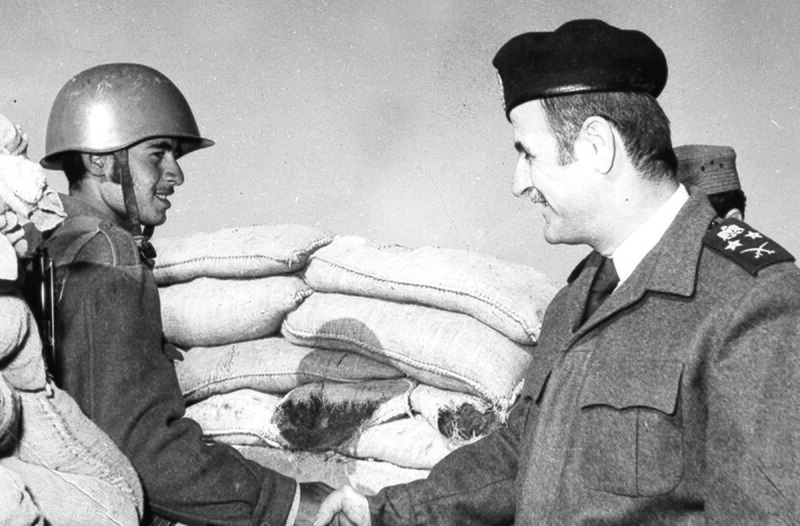
Assad visits the Syrian army on the Golan Heights front during the war

In the southern sector, the Israeli Barak Armored Brigade had to defend a much flatter terrain. It also faced two-thirds of the Syrian second wave, while fielding at this time less than a third of the operational Israeli tanks. Beside these objective draw-backs, it suffered from ineffective command. Ben-Shoham initially still had his headquarters in Nafah, far from his sector. He did not realise a full war was in progress and tended to spread the 53rd TB platoons along the entire line, to stop any Syrian incursion. Also, he failed to coordinate the deployment of 82nd TB and 53rd TB.

The commander of 53rd TB, Lieutenant-Colonel Oded Eres, sent the two arriving companies of 82nd TB to his right flank and centre. No further reinforcement materialising, he urgently ordered the southern company to the north again; it was ambushed on the way. His left flank at Kudne remained unreinforced, although the defending company had increased the number of operational tanks to eight. This was the main axis of the Syrian 9th Infantry Division and its commander, Colonel Hassan Tourkmani, ordered the remnants of an organic tank battalion to be sacrificed forcing the minefield belt. Subsequently, the Syrian 51st Armored Brigade bypassed bunker complex 111 after dark. It then overran the Israeli supply compound at the Hushniya cross-roads.

Parts of the 75th Mechanised Infantry Battalion had been concentrated at Hushniya, but they did not consist of its two organic tank companies; they were M-113 units. Lacking modern antitank weapons, Israeli infantry was ineffective at stopping Syrian armor. The 51st AB passing through the Kudne/Rafid Gap turned northwest to move along the Petroleum Road or "Tapline Road", which provided a diagonal route across the heights, running straight from Hushniya to Nafah, the Israeli Golan headquarters, in the rear of the Quneitra Gap.

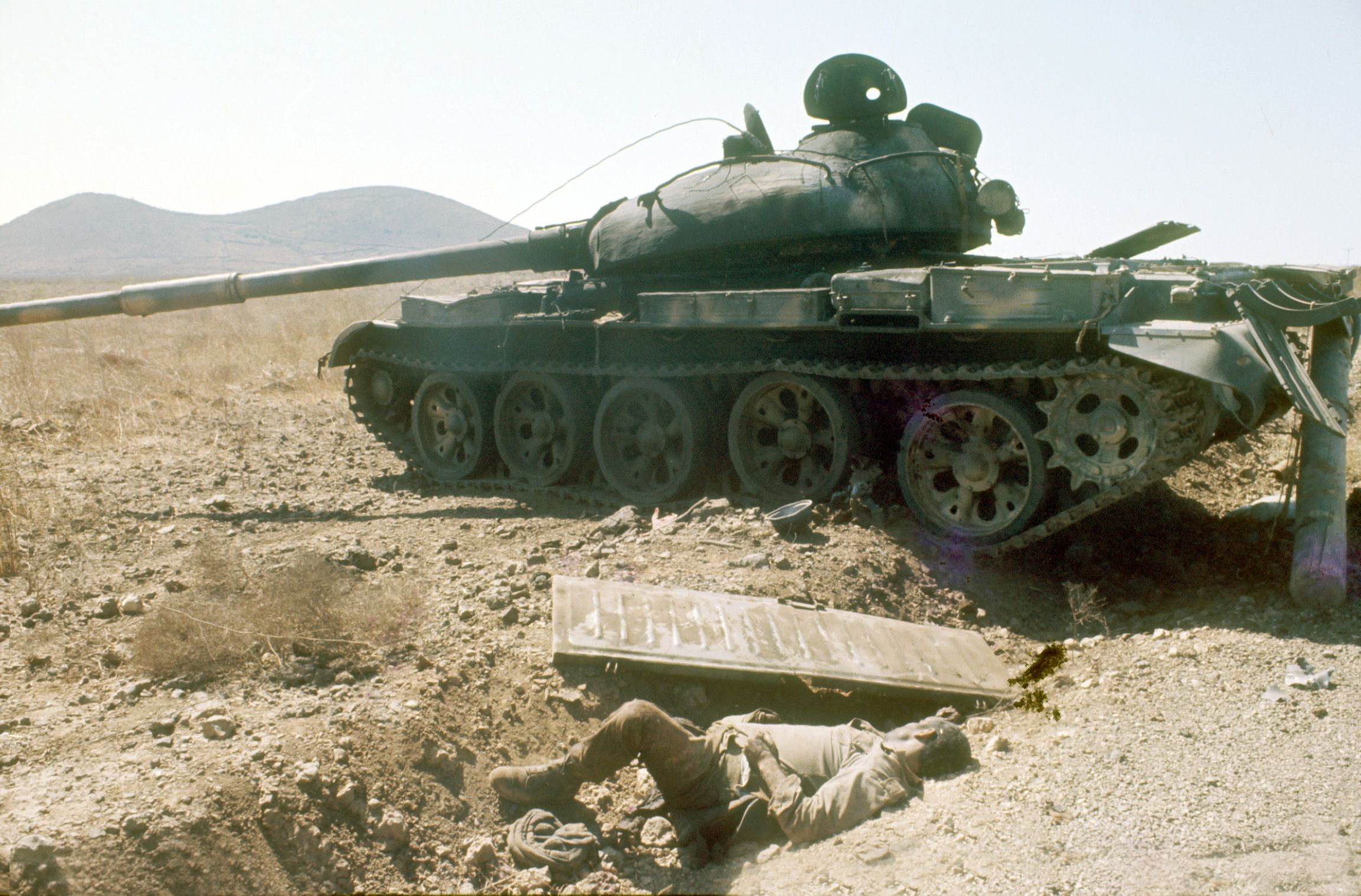
Destroyed Syrian T-62 tank on the Golan Heights

Israeli command was initially slow to realise that a breakthrough had taken place. Their main concern was that the Syrians would occupy some forward bunker complex or settlement. The fact that the defending tank platoons were still intact was seen as proof that the line had not been broken. Ben-Shoham around 18:30 moved his headquarters to the south. Reports of Syrian radio traffic at Hushniya, of Israeli reserve tanks passing columns of Syrian tanks in the dark and of enemy tanks moving at the rear of the observation post on Tel Saki, were dismissed by him as misidentifications. Only when two tanks parked in the dark near his staff vehicles and were recognised for T-55s when hastily driving away upon being hailed, he understood that a large Syrian tank unit had infiltrated his lines.

As a result, no regular units were directed to block a Syrian advance to Nafah. Ben-Shoham had ordered Lieutenant Zvika Greengold, who, about to be trained as a tank company commander, had arrived at Nafah unattached to any combat unit, to gather some crews and follow him to the south with a few tanks to take command of the bunker complex 111 and 112 tank forces which had lost all officers. Five kilometres (three miles) south of Nafah base, Greengold was warned by a truck convoy that there were Syrian tanks ahead. These belonged to the 452nd Tank Battalion, hurrying north to surprise Nafah.

Confronted at short range with a first group of three T-55's, Greengold's Centurion destroyed them in quick succession. He then moved parallel to the road to the south, hitting advancing Syrian tanks in the flank and destroying another ten until he approached Hushniya. From this the commander of 452nd TB, Major Farouk Ismail, concluded that he had been ambushed by a strong Israeli tank unit and concentrated his remaining vehicles in a defensive position at Hushniya. Greengold decided not to reveal how precarious the Israeli situation was, in radio contact with Ben-Shoham hiding the fact that his "Force Zvika" consisted of only a single tank.

The next 9th Infantry Division unit to participate in the second wave, the 43rd Mechanised Infantry Brigade, entered the Golan at Kudne, but then sharply turned to the right advancing over the lateral "Reshet" road behind the Purple Line in the direction of Quneitra. Israeli 1st Infantry Brigade elements warned 7th Armored Brigade of the danger. Ben Gal then released the 82nd TB company he had held back, commanded by Captain Meir "Tiger" Zamir, and sent it to the south to cover his flank. Zamir ambushed the Syrian brigade; directing their fire with the xenon light projector on one of his tanks his company destroyed a dozen vehicles. At dawn he surprised the enemy column from the rear and dispersed the remnants of 43 MIB, having knocked-out all of its forty tanks.

=== Israeli strategic response ===
Around midnight, Hofi, at Safed, began to understand the magnitude of the Syrian breakthrough. He warned chief-of-staff Elazar that the entire Golan might be lost. Overhearing this message, an alarmed Dayan decided to personally visit the Northern Command headquarters. In the late night, Hofi informed Dayan that an estimated three hundred Syrian tanks had entered the southern Golan. No reserves were available to stop a Syrian incursion into Galilee. Visibly shaken by this news, the Israeli minister of defence ordered the Jordan bridges to be prepared for detonation.

Next, he contacted Benjamin Peled, commander of the Israeli Air Force. He shocked Peled by announcing that the Third Temple was about to fall. The IAF had just made a successful start with Operation Tagar, a very complex plan to neutralise the Egyptian AA-missile belt. Overruling objections by Peled, Dayan ordered to immediately carry out Operation Doogman 5 instead, the destruction of the Syrian SAM-belt, to allow the IAF to halt the Syrian advance.

As there was no time to obtain recent information on the location of the batteries, the attempt was a costly failure. The Israelis destroyed only one Syrian missile battery but lost six Phantom II aircraft. As a result, the IAF was unable to make a significant contribution to the defensive battle on the Golan. Over both fronts together, on 7 October only 129 bombardment sorties were flown. It also proved impossible to restart Tagar, curtailing IAF operations on the Sinai front for the duration of the war.

Less pessimistic than Dayan, Elazar was not ready yet to abandon the Golan Heights. Israeli High Command had a strategic reserve, consisting of the 146th Ugda that was earmarked for Central Command, controlling the eastern border with Jordan. In the evening of 6 October, Elazar had considered sending this division to the collapsing Sinai front in view of the initial defensive success at the Golan. The unexpected crisis led to an about-face. Priority was given to the north because of its proximity to Israeli population centers at Tiberias, Safed, Haifa and Netanya. Elazar ordered that, after mobilisation, the 146th Ugda was to reconquer the southern Golan.

This division would take some time to deploy. Some smaller units could be quickly mobilised to bolster the defenses. The Syrians had expected it to take at least twenty-four hours for Israeli reserves to reach the front lines; in fact, they began to join the fight only nine hours after the war began, twelve hours after the start of the mobilisation. The Golan position had been at only 80% of its planned strength for the defensive phase of a full war with Syria. Northern Command had a headquarters reserve consisting of an unnumbered rapid deployment Centurion tank battalion. Also, the 71st Mechanised Infantry Battalion, with two organic tank companies, of the 188th AB had not yet been activated. During the night of 6/7 October these two battalions were gradually brought up.

Around 01:00 on 7 October, the 36th Division was activated as a divisional headquarters under Brigadier Rafael Eitan, to take direct command of the northern front. The 7th Armored Brigade did not have this division as its original destination. It was an elite active General Headquarters reserve, moved from the Sinai to the Golan in reaction to the Syrian build-up. Under the original mobilisation Plan Gir ("Chalk"), the 36th Division was to be expanded by the 179th Armored Brigade. In the evening of 6 October, it was considered to send this brigade to the Sinai instead but this option was abandoned after the Syrian breakthrough. To speed up the relocation of 7th Armored Brigade to the north, this brigade had left its tanks at Tasa, the main mobilisation complex of the Sinai, and used the stocked vehicles of the 179th Armored Brigade to rebuild itself at Nafah.

In turn, the 179th Armored Brigade began to mobilise in eastern Galilee, from the mobilisation complex at the foot of the Golan Heights, using the stocked vehicles of the 164th Armoured Brigade. This latter brigade was earmarked for the 240th Division, a division to be held in reserve. Assuming that a sustained Syrian offensive would have led to crippling Arab tank losses, 36th and 240th divisions were in the prewar planning intended to execute an advance in the direction of Damascus, Operation Ze'ev Aravot ("Desert Wolf"). All remaining stocked Centurions in the north were eventually used to rebuild 7th and 188th brigades on the night of 9/10 October. The 164th Armored Brigade was ultimately sent to the Sinai, to activate itself using the old 7th Armored Brigade matériel.

The 679th Armored Brigade was intended to join the 240th Division and ordered to mobilise at noon 6 October. Reservists of both brigades arriving at the Galilee army depots were quickly assigned to tanks and sent to the front, without waiting for the crews they trained with to arrive, machine guns to be installed, or the tank guns to be calibrated, a time-consuming process known as bore-sighting. Elements of such larger units were during 7 October fed into the battle piece-meal.

=== Collapse of the Israeli 188th Armored Brigade ===
The Syrian first and second wave had in total numbered about six hundred tanks, half of which had been lost by the morning of 7 October. By this time, the Israelis had committed about 250 tanks to battle. Of the initially arriving reserves, the 71 MIB was used to block an advance by the westernmost elements of the Syrian 9th Infantry Division towards the Bnot Yaacov Bridge, the crucial connection between Galilee and Nafah. During the late evening of 6 October, the NCTB advanced from Nafah towards Hushniya, attempting to seal the breakthrough point. The attack, running into prepared positions occupied by a superior force of T-55s, was a dismal failure, leaving all of its officers dead or wounded. Greengold incorporated the remnants of the unit into his "Force Zvika".

By the early morning of 7 October, all attempts to patch the breach in the main defensive line of the southern sector became futile because also the center and right flank of the 188th AB had started to collapse. During the night, it had largely managed to hold its ground against continuous attacks, inflicting severe losses on the Syrians with accurate cannon fire, hoping to buy time for reserve forces to reach the front lines. Some tank crews sacrificed themselves rather than voluntarily give ground. Gradually, the fighting subsided.

Dawn revealed that the Syrian 5th Infantry Division under the cover of darkness had at numerous points bridged the tank ditch and cleared corridors through the minefield belt. The situation of 188th AB was rendered even more hazardous by the presence in its rear of the Syrian 9th Infantry Division. It was decided to abandon the southern Golan. In the night, many artillery and logistic units had already withdrawn, some slipping through the columns of 9th ID, others being destroyed by them. Civilian Jewish settlements had been evacuated. The same now happened with most fortifications, except bunker complex 116.

Ben-Shoham with his staff outflanked the Syrian penetration via a western route and reached the north. The 82nd TB company that had reinforced the center, commanded by Eli Geva, had the previous evening destroyed about thirty Syrian tanks. It now successfully crossed the axis of 9th ID to the north. Of the originally thirty-six tanks of 53rd TB, twelve remained. Eres hid them in the crater of Tel Faris, where a surveillance base was located. During the late evening of 7 October, he would successfully break out to the west.

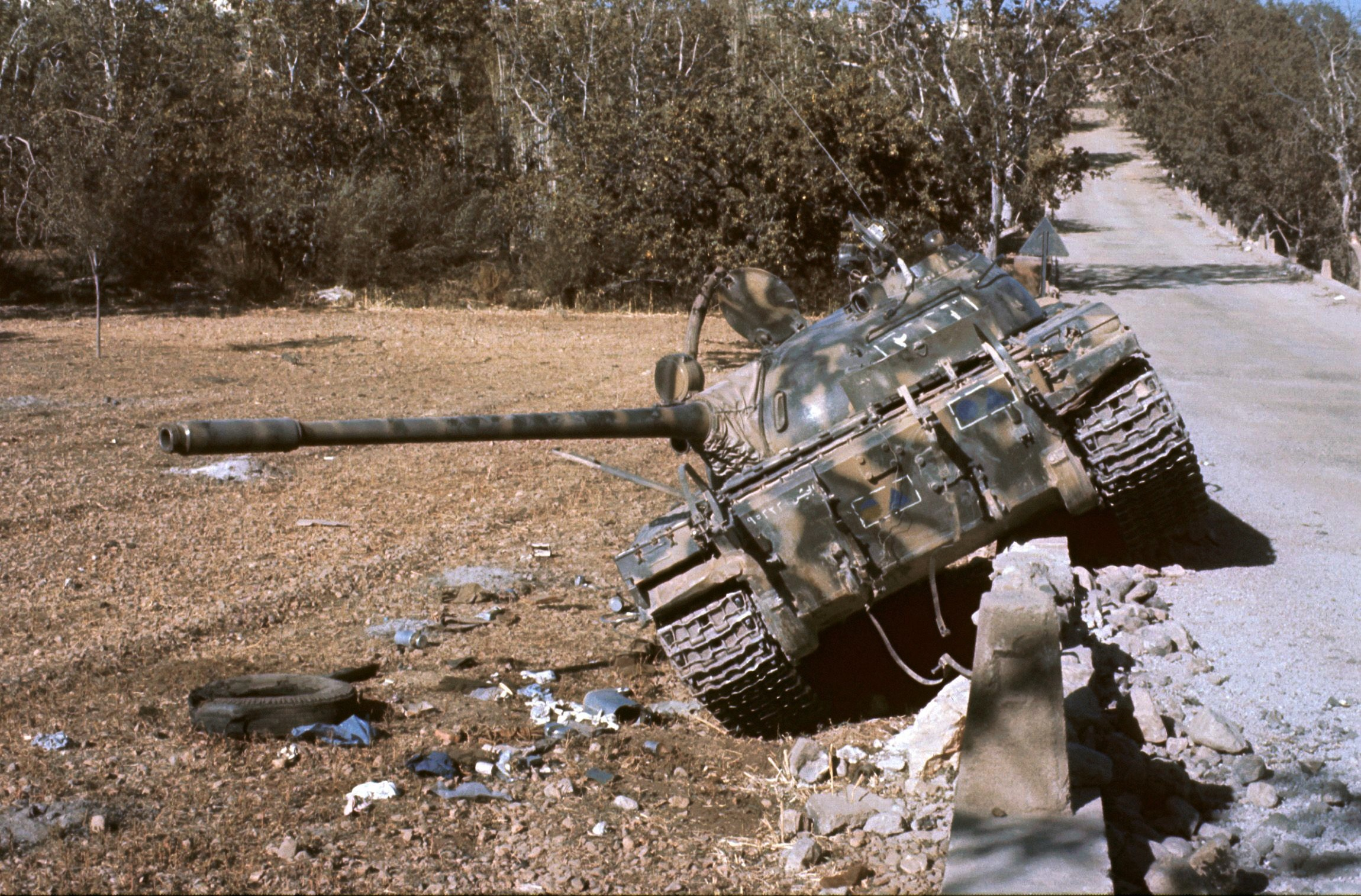
An abandoned Syrian T-55 tank

The Syrian 5th ID subsequently occupied the plateau of the southern Golan. Ben-Shoham tried to maintain a foothold on the access roads by small groups of APCs manned by the 50th Paratrooper Battalion, but these were easily brushed aside. The Syrian 47th Armored Brigade advanced along the escarpment to the north, in the direction of the Bnot Yaacov Bridge. The 132nd Mechanised Infantry Brigade positioned itself east of El Al, on the road along the Jordan border, running to the south of Lake Tiberias. Israeli General Dan Lener in the late night activated the divisional headquarters of the 210th Ugda to take control over the sector between the lake and the Bnot Yaacov Bridge but he had no regular units to hold this line.

For the moment, he could do little more than personally halt retreating troops and vehicles on the more southern Arik Bridge and send them over the River Jordan again. Israeli command feared that the Syrians would quickly exploit this situation by advancing into Galilee. Dayan in the morning of 7 October called Shalhevet Freier, the director-general of the Israel Atomic Energy Commission, to a meeting with Golda Meir to discuss the possible arming of nuclear weapons. Meir rejected this option. The Syrian mechanised brigades in this area did not continue the offensive but began to entrench themselves in strong defensive positions. They had been forbidden by Al-Assad to approach the River Jordan, for fear of triggering an Israeli nuclear response.

The original Syrian offensive plan Al-Aouda ("The Return"), devised by Major-General Adul Habeisi, had emphasized the element of tactical surprise. It was known to the Syrians that the 188th AB normally rotated its two tank battalions on the Purple Line, so that on any given moment just thirty-three tanks were guarding the tank ditch. Infiltrations by commando teams armed with Saggers were planned to quickly isolate these ten tank platoons from reinforcement by tactical reserves. Simultaneously, helicopter-borne commando attacks at the Jordan bridges, landing during conditions of dusk to avoid the IAF, would isolate the Golan Heights from strategic reinforcements.

Night attacks by the three Syrian infantry divisions would then fragment the weakly-held forward Israeli defensive positions. To conclude the operation and deter any Israeli attempt to reconquer the Golan, the Syrian 1st and 3rd Armored Division would advance onto the plateau. This way, it was hoped to take the Golan within thirty hours. Coordination with Egypt forced a change of plans. The Egyptians wanted hostilities to start at noon; in the end they agreed to a compromise time of 14:00. The Syrian helicopter attacks were cancelled. Now uncertain of a successful outcome, the Syrians became less committed to the attack. They decided to keep one armored division as a strategic reserve, together with the two presidential guard independent armored brigades, which fielded the most modern tank matériel.

=== Israel retakes the southern Golan ===
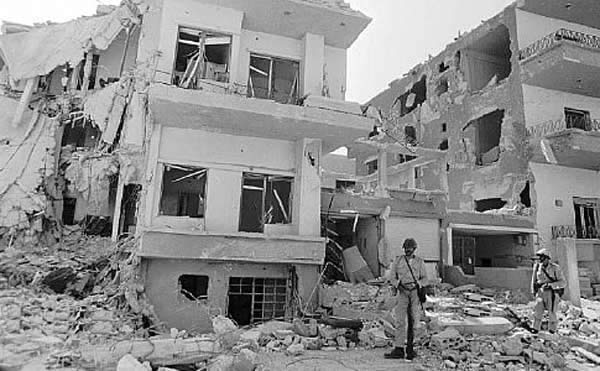
The aftermath of an Israeli airstrike on the Syrian General Staff headquarters in Damascus

The tide in the Golan began to turn as arriving Israeli reserve forces were able to contain the Syrian advance. Beginning on 8 October, the Israelis began pushing the Syrians back towards the pre-war ceasefire lines, inflicting heavy tank losses.

On 9 October, the Syrians launched a counterattack north of Quneitra. As part of the operation, they attempted to land heli-borne troops in the vicinity of El Rom. The counterattack was repulsed, and four Syrian helicopters were shot down with total loss of life. Syrian FROG-7 artillery rockets struck the Israeli Air Force base of Ramat David, killing a pilot and injuring several soldiers. Additional missiles struck civilian settlements. In retaliation, seven Israeli F-4 Phantoms flew into Syria and struck the Syrian General Staff Headquarters in Damascus. One Israeli Phantom was shot down. The attack prompted the Syrians to transfer air defense units from the Golan Heights to the home front, allowing the IAF greater freedom of action.

By 10 October, the last Syrian unit in the central sector was pushed back across the Purple Line, the pre-war ceasefire line. After four days of intense and incessant combat, the Israelis had succeeded in ejecting the Syrians from the entire Golan.

=== Israeli advance towards Damascus ===
A decision now had to be made—whether to stop at the post-1967 border or to continue advancing into Syrian territory. The Israeli High Command spent all of 10 October debating well into the night. Some favored disengagement, which would allow soldiers to be redeployed to the Sinai (Shmuel Gonen's defeat at Hizayon in the Sinai had taken place two days earlier). Others favored continuing the attack into Syria, towards Damascus, which would knock Syria out of the war; it would also restore Israel's image as the supreme military power in the Middle East and would give Israel a valuable bargaining chip once the war ended.

Others countered that Syria had strong defenses—antitank ditches, minefields, and strongpoints—and that it would be better to fight from defensive positions in the Golan Heights (rather than the flat terrain deeper in Syria) in the event of another war with Syria. However, Prime Minister Golda Meir realized the most crucial point of the whole debate:

It would take four days to shift a division to the Sinai. If the war ended during this period, the war would end with a territorial loss for Israel in the Sinai and no gain in the north—an unmitigated defeat. This was a political matter and her decision was unmitigating—to cross the purple line. ... The attack would be launched tomorrow, Thursday, 11 October.

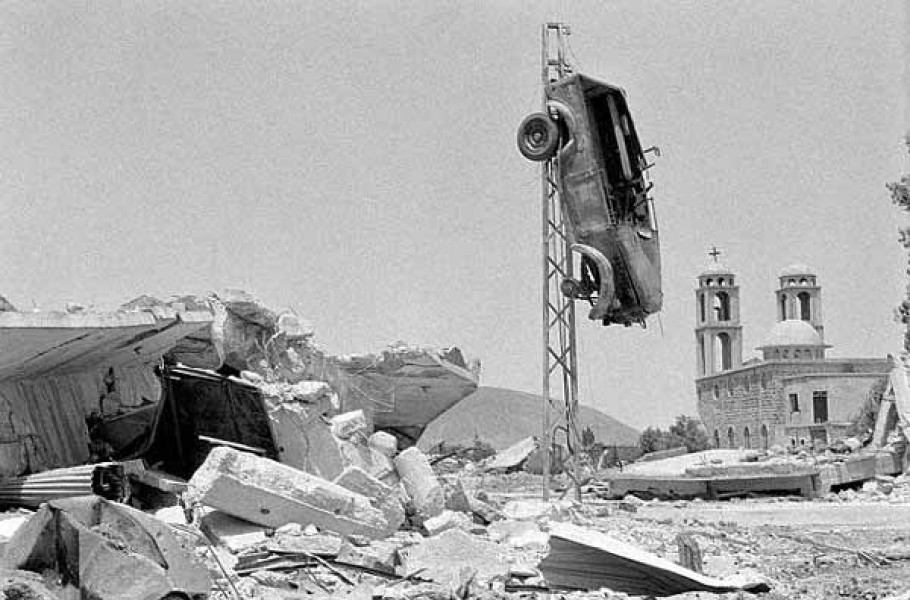
Quneitra village after Israeli shelling, showing a church and an elevated car

On 11 October, Israeli forces pushed into Syria and advanced towards Damascus along the Quneitra-Damascus road until 14 October, encountering stiff resistance by Syrian reservists in prepared defenses. Three Israeli divisions broke the first and second defensive lines near Sasa, and conquered a further 50 square kilometres of territory in the Bashan salient. The Israeli Army advanced to within 30 km of Damascus and shelled the city's outskirts.

On 12 October, Israeli paratroopers from the elite Sayeret Tzanhanim reconnaissance unit launched Operation Gown, infiltrating deep into Syria and destroying a bridge in the tri-border area of Syria, Iraq, and Jordan. The operation disrupted the flow of weapons and troops to Syria. During the operation, the paratroopers destroyed a number of tank transports and killed several Syrian soldiers. There were no Israeli casualties.

=== Arab military intervention ===
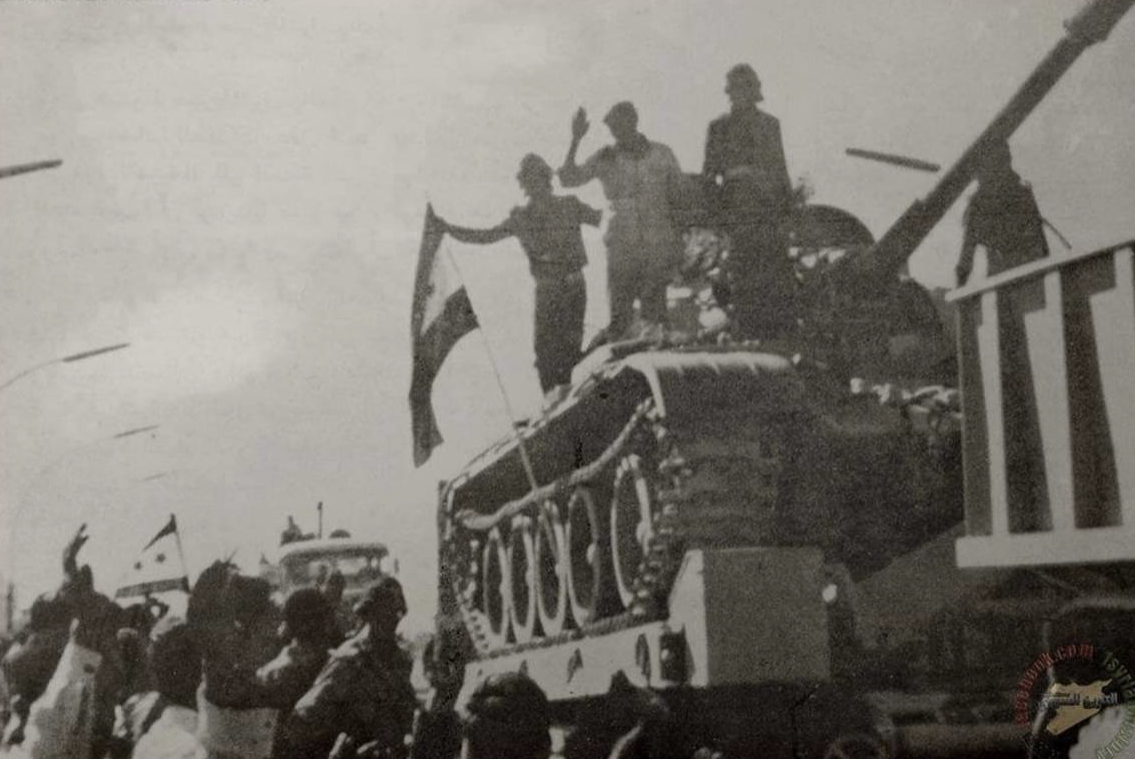
Columns of trucks with Iraqi tanks on the way to Syria

As the Syrian position deteriorated, Jordan sent an expeditionary force into Syria. King Hussein, who had come under intense pressure to enter the war, told Israel of his intentions through U.S. intermediaries, in the hope that Israel would accept that this was not a casus belli justifying an attack on Jordan. Israeli Defense Minister Moshe Dayan declined to offer any such assurance, but said that Israel had no intention of opening another front. Iraq also sent an expeditionary force to Syria, consisting of the 3rd and 6th Armoured Divisions, some 30,000 men, 250–500 tanks, and 700 APCs. Israeli jets attacked Iraqi forces as they arrived in Syria.

The Iraqi divisions were a strategic surprise for the IDF, which had expected 24-hour-plus advance intelligence of such moves. This turned into an operational surprise, as the Iraqis attacked the exposed southern flank of the advancing Israeli armor, forcing its advance units to retreat a few kilometres in order to prevent encirclement. Combined Syrian, Iraqi and Jordanian counterattacks prevented any further Israeli gains. However, they were unable to push the Israelis back from the Bashan salient, and suffered heavy losses in their engagements with the Israelis. The most effective attack took place on 20 October, though Arab forces lost 120 tanks in that engagement.

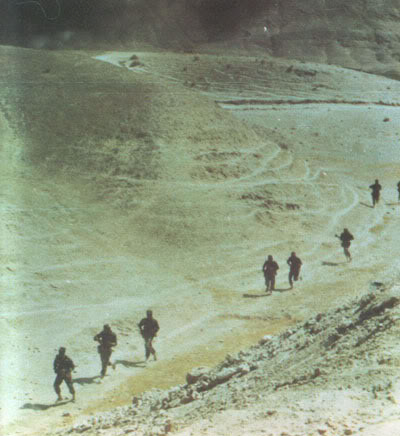
Iraqi and Syrian soldiers attack together

The Syrian Air Force attacked Israeli columns, but its operations were highly limited because of Israeli air superiority, and it suffered heavy losses in dogfights with Israeli jets. On 23 October, a large air battle took place near Damascus during which the Israelis shot down 10 Syrian aircraft. The Syrians claimed a similar toll against Israel. The IDF also destroyed the Syrian missile defense system. The Israeli Air Force utilized its air superiority to attack strategic targets throughout Syria, including important power plants, petrol supplies, bridges and main roads. The strikes weakened the Syrian war effort, disrupted Soviet efforts to airlift military equipment into Syria, and disrupted normal life inside the country.

On 22 October, the Golani Brigade and Sayeret Matkal commandos recaptured the outpost on Mount Hermon, after a hard-fought battle that involved hand-to-hand combat and Syrian sniper attacks. An Israeli paratroop force landing by helicopter took the corresponding Syrian Hermon outposts on the mountain. An unsuccessful attack two weeks prior had cost the Israelis 23 dead and 55 wounded and the Syrians 29 dead and 11 wounded, while this second attack cost the Israelis 56 dead and 83 wounded. The Syrians lost about 120 killed and 100 wounded and several Syrian soldiers were taken prisoner. An IDF D9 bulldozer supported by infantry forced its way to the peak. Seven Syrian MiGs and two Syrian helicopters carrying reinforcements were shot down as they attempted to intercede.

=== Northern front de-escalation ===
On 22 October, the United Nations Security Council adopted Resolution 338 calling for a ceasefire. Following the UN-backed ceasefire, there were ongoing artillery exchanges and skirmishes, and Israeli forces continued to occupy positions deep within Syria. Some aerial engagements took place, and both sides lost several aircraft. Amid mounting international pressure and further UN resolutions calling for a ceasefire, the war finally came to a close on 26 October. Israel and Egypt signed a formal cease-fire agreement on 11 November, and this was followed by a disengagement agreement on 18 January the next year.

Hostilities between Israel and Syria continued, and on 4 February 1974, 500 Cubans joined a Syrian tank division at Mount Hermon in an attack against Israeli forces, sparking a War of Attrition in the Bashan Salient. (Note: Castro dispatched 500 Cuban tank commanders to Syria.) It ended only on 31 May with a ceasefire between Israel and Syria.

=== Jordanian participation ===
The U.S. pressed King Hussein to keep Jordan out of the war. Though King Hussein initially refrained from entering the conflict, on the night of 12–13 October Jordanian troops deployed to the Jordanian-Syrian frontier to buttress Syrian troops, and Jordanian forces joined Syrian and Iraqi assaults on Israeli positions on 16 and 19 October. Hussein sent a second brigade to the Golan front on 21 October. According to historian Assaf David, declassified U.S. documents show that the Jordanian participation was only a token to preserve King Hussein's status in the Arab world. The documents reveal that Israel and Jordan had a tacit understanding that the Jordanian units would try to stay out of the fighting and Israel would try to not attack them.

== Naval operations ==
A diagram of the Battle of Baltim

On the first day of the war, Egyptian missile boats bombarded Israeli positions on the Sinai coast; targeting Rumana, Ras Beyron, Ras Masala and Ras Sudar on the Mediterranean and Sharm el-Sheikh on the Red Sea coast of the Sinai Peninsula. Egyptian frogmen raided the oil installations at Bala'eem, disabling the massive driller. Several small naval engagements took place on 7 October, including the Battle of Latakia and Battle of Marsa Talamat, both of which were Israeli victories. The Battle of Latakia, which saw Israeli and Syrian missile boats face off, was the first naval battle in history to be fought solely with missiles and electronic deception. It ended with all of the Syrian missile boats sunk.

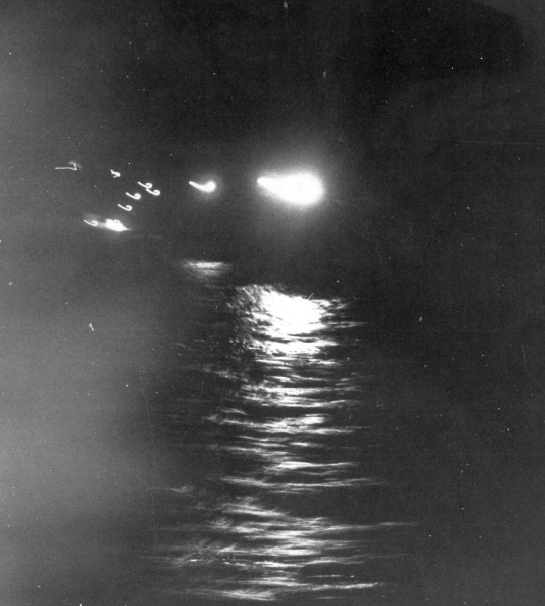
A Syrian Styx missile fired at an Israeli missile boat

The Battle of Baltim, which took place on 8–9 October off the coast of Baltim and Damietta, ended in a decisive Israeli victory. Six Israeli missile boats heading towards Port Said encountered four Egyptian missile boats coming from Alexandria. In an engagement lasting about forty minutes, the Israelis evaded Egyptian Styx missiles using electronic countermeasures and sank three of the Egyptian missile boats with Gabriel missiles and gunfire. The Battles of Latakia and Baltim "drastically changed the operational situation at sea to Israeli advantage".

Five nights after the Battle of Baltim, five Israeli patrol boats entered the Egyptian anchorage at Ras Ghareb, where over fifty Egyptian small patrol craft and armed fishing boats mobilized for the war effort and loaded with troops, ammunition, and supplies bound for the Israeli side of the Gulf were based. In the battle that followed, 19 Egyptian boats were sunk, while others remained bottled up in port.

The Israeli Navy had control of the Gulf of Suez during the war, which made possible the continued deployment of an Israeli SAM battery near an Israeli naval base close to the southern end of the Suez Canal, depriving the Egyptian Third Army of air support and preventing it from moving southward and attempting to capture the southern Sinai.

On 18 October, Israeli frogmen set off an explosion that severed two underwater communications cables off Beirut, one of which led to Alexandria and the other to Marseille. As a result, telex and telecommunications between the West and Syria were severed, and were not restored until the cables were repaired on 27 October. The cables had also been used by the Syrians and Egyptians to communicate with each other in preference to using radio, which was monitored by Israeli, U.S. and Soviet intelligence. Egypt and Syria resorted to communicating via a Jordanian radio station in Ajloun, bouncing the signals off a U.S. satellite.

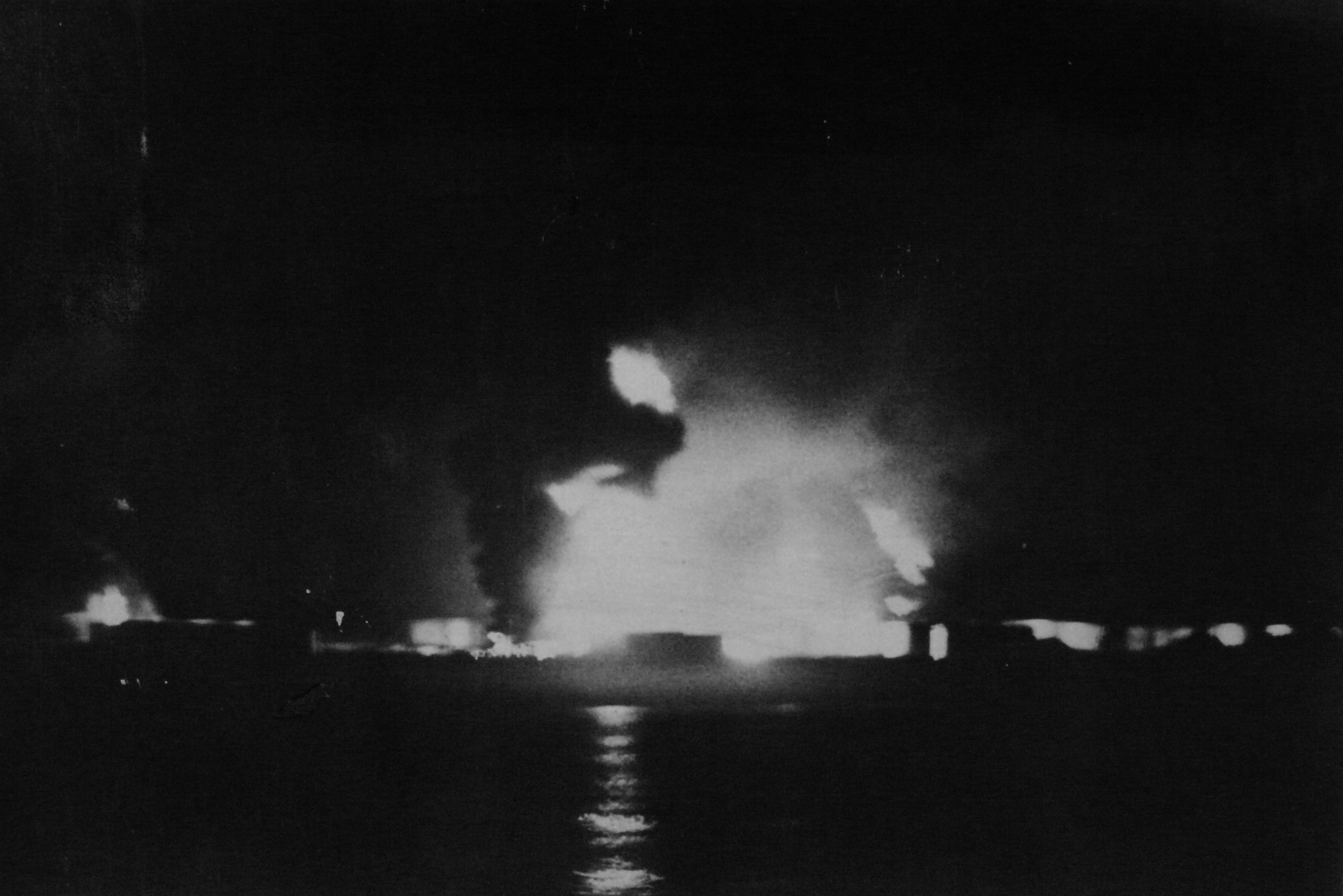
A Syrian oil terminal in Baniyas after being shelled by Israeli Sa'ar 3-class missile boats

Having decisively beaten the Egyptian and Syrian navies, the Israeli Navy had the run of the coastlines. Israeli missile boats utilized their 76 mm cannons and other armaments to strike targets along the Egyptian and Syrian coastlines, including wharves, oil tank farms, coastal batteries, radar stations, airstrips, and other targets of military value. The Israeli Navy even attacked some of Egypt's northernmost SAM batteries. The Israeli Navy's attacks were carried out with minimal support from the IAF (only one Arab naval target was destroyed from the air during the entire war).

The Egyptian Navy managed to enforce a blockade at Bab-el-Mandeb. Eighteen million tons of oil had been transported yearly from Iran to Israel through the straits of Bab-el-Mandeb. The blockade was enforced by two Egyptian destroyers and two submarines, supported by ancillary craft. Shipping destined for Israel through the Gulf of Eilat was halted by the Egyptians. The Israeli Navy had no means of lifting the blockade due to the long range involved, and the Israeli Air Force, apparently also incapable of lifting the blockade, did not challenge it. The blockade was lifted on 1 November, after Israel used the surrounded Egyptian Third Army as a bargaining chip. The Egyptians unsuccessfully attempted to blockade the Israeli Mediterranean coastline, and mined the Gulf of Suez to prevent the transportation of oil from the Bala'eem and Abu Rudeis oil fields in southwestern Sinai to Eilat in southern Israel. Two oil tankers, of 48,000 ton and 2,000 ton capacity, sank after hitting mines in the Gulf.

According to Admiral Ze'ev Almog, the Israeli Navy escorted tankers from the Gulf to Eilat throughout the war, and Israeli tankers sailing from Iran were directed to bypass the Red Sea. As a result of these actions and the failure of Egypt's Mediterranean blockade, the transport of oil, grain and weapons to Israeli ports was made possible throughout nearly the entire war. A post-war survey found that during the entire war period, Israel suffered no oil shortages, and even sold oil to third parties affected by the Arab oil embargo. This survey was disputed by Edgar O'Ballance, who said that no oil went to Israel during the blockade, and the Eilat-Ashdod pipeline was empty by the end of the war.

Israel responded with a counter-blockade of Egypt in the Gulf of Suez. The Israeli blockade was enforced by naval vessels based at Sharm el-Sheikh and on the Sinai coast facing the Gulf of Suez. The Israeli blockade substantially damaged the Egyptian economy. According to historian Gammal Hammad, Egypt's principal ports, Alexandria and Port Safaga, remained open to shipping throughout the war. Throughout the war, the Israeli Navy enjoyed complete command of the seas both in the Mediterranean approaches and in the Gulf of Suez.

During the last week of the war, Egyptian frogmen carried out three or four raids on Eilat. The attacks caused minor damage, but created some alarm.

According to Israeli and Western sources, the Israelis lost no vessels in the war. Israeli vessels were "targeted by as many as 52 Soviet-made anti-ship missiles", but none hit their targets. According to historian Benny Morris, the Egyptians lost seven missile boats and four torpedo boats and coastal defense craft, while the Syrians lost five missile boats, one minesweeper, and one coastal defense vessel.

=== U.S.–Soviet naval standoff ===
The war saw the largest naval confrontation between the United States Navy and Soviet Navy of the entire Cold War. As the United States and Soviet Union supported their respective allies, their fleets in the Mediterranean became increasingly hostile toward each other. The Soviet 5th Operational Squadron had 52 ships in the Mediterranean when the war began, including 11 submarines, some of which carried cruise missiles with nuclear warheads. The United States Sixth Fleet had 48, including two aircraft carriers, a helicopter carrier, and amphibious vessels carrying 2,000 marines.

As the war continued, both sides reinforced their fleets. The Soviet squadron grew to 97 vessels including 23 submarines, while the US Sixth Fleet grew to 60 vessels including 9 submarines, 2 helicopter carriers, and 3 aircraft carriers. Both fleets made preparations for war, and US aircraft conducted reconnaissance over the Soviet fleet. The two fleets began to disengage following the ceasefire.

== Participation by other states ==
=== U.S. intelligence efforts ===
The U.S. intelligence community, including the CIA, failed to predict in advance the Egyptian–Syrian attack on Israel. A U.S. intelligence report as late as 4 October still stated that "We continue to believe that an outbreak of major Arab–Israeli hostilities remains unlikely for the immediate future". However, one U.S. government source that was able to predict the approaching war was Roger Merrick, an analyst working for the INR (Bureau of Intelligence and Research in the State Department), but his conclusions were ignored at the time, and the report he had written to that effect was only rediscovered by U.S. government archive officials in 2013.

=== U.S. aid to Israel ===
Based on intelligence estimates at the commencement of hostilities, American leaders expected the tide of the war to quickly shift in Israel's favor, and that Arab armies would be completely defeated within 72 to 96 hours. On 6 October, Secretary of State Kissinger convened the National Security Council's official crisis management group, the Washington Special Actions Group, which debated whether the U.S. should supply additional arms to Israel. High-ranking representatives of the Defense and State Departments opposed such a move. Kissinger was the sole dissenter; he said that if the U.S. refused aid, Israel would have little incentive to conform to American views in postwar diplomacy. Kissinger argued the sending of U.S. aid might cause Israel to moderate its territorial claims, but this thesis raised a protracted debate whether U.S. aid was likely to make it more accommodating or more intransigent toward the Arab world.

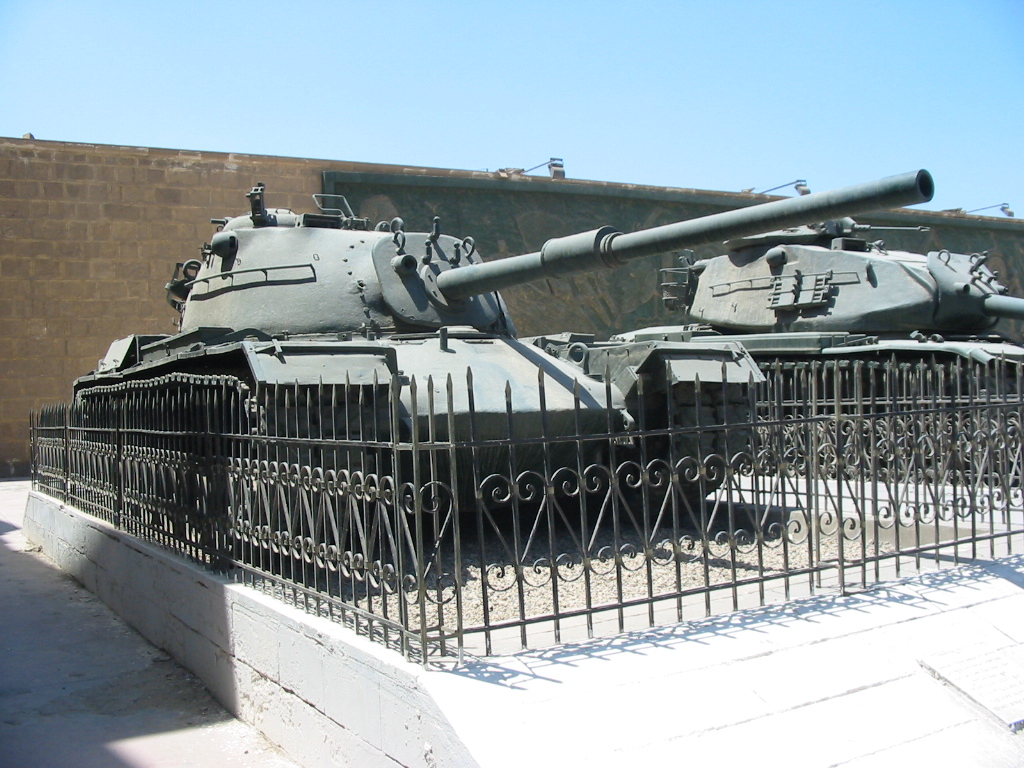
An Israeli M48 Patton captured by Egyptian forces

By 8 October, Israel had encountered military difficulties on both fronts. In the Sinai, Israeli efforts to break through Egyptian lines with armor had been thwarted, and while Israel had contained and begun to turn back the Syrian advance, Syrian forces were still overlooking the Jordan River and their air defense systems were inflicting a high toll on Israeli planes. It became clear by 9 October that no quick reversal in Israel's favor would occur and that IDF losses were unexpectedly high.

During the night of 8–9 October, an alarmed Dayan told Meir that "this is the end of the third temple." He was warning of Israel's impending total defeat, but "Temple" was also the code word for Israel's nuclear weapons. Dayan raised the nuclear topic in a cabinet meeting, warning that the country was approaching a point of "last resort". That night, Meir authorized the assembly of thirteen 20-kiloton-of-TNT (84 TJ) tactical nuclear weapons for Jericho missiles at Sdot Micha Airbase and F-4 Phantom II aircraft at Tel Nof Airbase. They would be used if absolutely necessary to prevent total defeat, but the preparation was done in an easily detectable way, likely as a signal to the United States. Kissinger learned of the nuclear alert on the morning of 9 October. That day, President Nixon ordered the commencement of Operation Nickel Grass, an American airlift to replace all of Israel's material losses.

Anecdotal evidence suggests that Kissinger told Sadat that the reason for the U.S. airlift was that the Israelis were close to "going nuclear". However, subsequent interviews with Kissinger, Schlesinger, and William Quandt suggested that the nuclear aspect was not a major factor in the decision to re-supply. These officials cited the ongoing Soviet re-supply effort and Sadat's early rejection of a ceasefire as the primary motivators. European countries refused to allow U.S. airplanes carrying supplies for Israel to refuel at their bases, fearing an Arab oil embargo, with the exception of Portugal and the Netherlands. Portugal permitted the United States to use the leased base of Lajes Field in the Azores, and the defence minister of the Netherlands, apparently acting without consulting his cabinet colleagues, secretly authorised the use of Dutch airfields. Greece, then under the dictatorial rule of the Regime of the Colonels, declared itself neutral in the conflict. However, the Greek junta permitted the United States to use communications facilities within Greece and the airports at Athens and at Souda Naval Base to facilitate its assistance to Israel, though it refused to allow the Americans to use its strategically important bases in Cyprus.

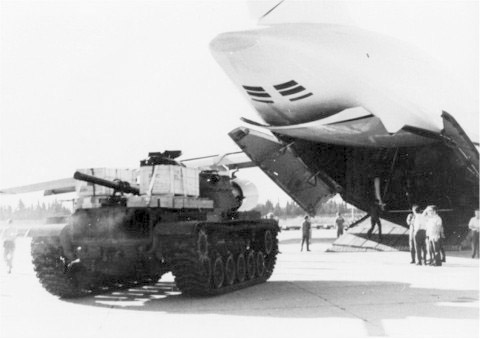
An M60 delivered during Operation Nickel Grass

Israel began receiving supplies via U.S. Air Force cargo airplanes on 14 October, although some equipment had arrived on planes from Israel's national airline El Al before this date. By that time, the IDF had advanced deep into Syria and was mounting a largely successful invasion of the Egyptian mainland from the Sinai, but had taken severe material losses. According to Abraham Rabinovich, "while the American airlift of supplies did not immediately replace Israel's losses in equipment, it did allow Israel to expend what it did have more freely".

By the end of Nickel Grass, the United States had shipped 22,395 tons of matériel to Israel. 8,755 tons of it arrived before the end of the war. American C-141 Starlifter and C-5 Galaxy aircraft flew 567 missions throughout the airlift. El Al planes flew in an additional 5,500 tons of matériel in 170 flights. The airlift continued after the war until 14 November. The United States delivered approximately 90,000 tons of materiel to Israel by sealift by the beginning of December, using 16 ships. 33,210 tons of it arrived by November.

By the beginning of December, Israel had received between 34 and 40 F-4 fighter-bombers, 46 A-4 attack airplanes, 12 C-130 cargo airplanes, 8 CH-53 helicopters, 40 unmanned aerial vehicles, 200 M-60/M-48A3 tanks, 250 APCs, 226 utility vehicles, 12 MIM-72 Chaparral surface-to-air missile systems, three MIM-23 Hawk SAM systems, 36 155 mm artillery pieces, seven 175 mm artillery pieces, and large quantities of 105 mm, 155 mm and 175 mm ammunition. State of the art equipment, such as the AGM-65 Maverick missile and the BGM-71 TOW, weapons that had only entered production one or more years prior, as well as highly advanced electronic jamming equipment, was also sent. Most of the combat airplanes arrived during the war, and many were taken directly from USAF units. Most of the large equipment arrived after the ceasefire. The total cost of the equipment was approximately US$800 million (US$5.8 billion today).

On 13 and 15 October, Egyptian air defense radar detected an aircraft at an altitude of 25,000 metres (82,000 ft) and a speed of Mach 3 (3,700 km/h; 2,300 mph), making it impossible to intercept either by fighter or SAM missiles. The aircraft proceeded to cross the whole of the canal zone, the naval ports of the Red Sea (Hurghada and Safaga), flew over the airbases and air defenses in the Nile delta, and finally disappeared from radar screens over the Mediterranean Sea. The speed and altitude were those of the U.S. SR-71 Blackbird. According to Egyptian commanders, the intelligence provided by the reconnaissance flights helped the Israelis prepare for the Egyptian attack on 14 October and assisted it in conducting Operation Stouthearted Men.

=== Aid to Egypt and Syria ===
==== Soviet supplies ====
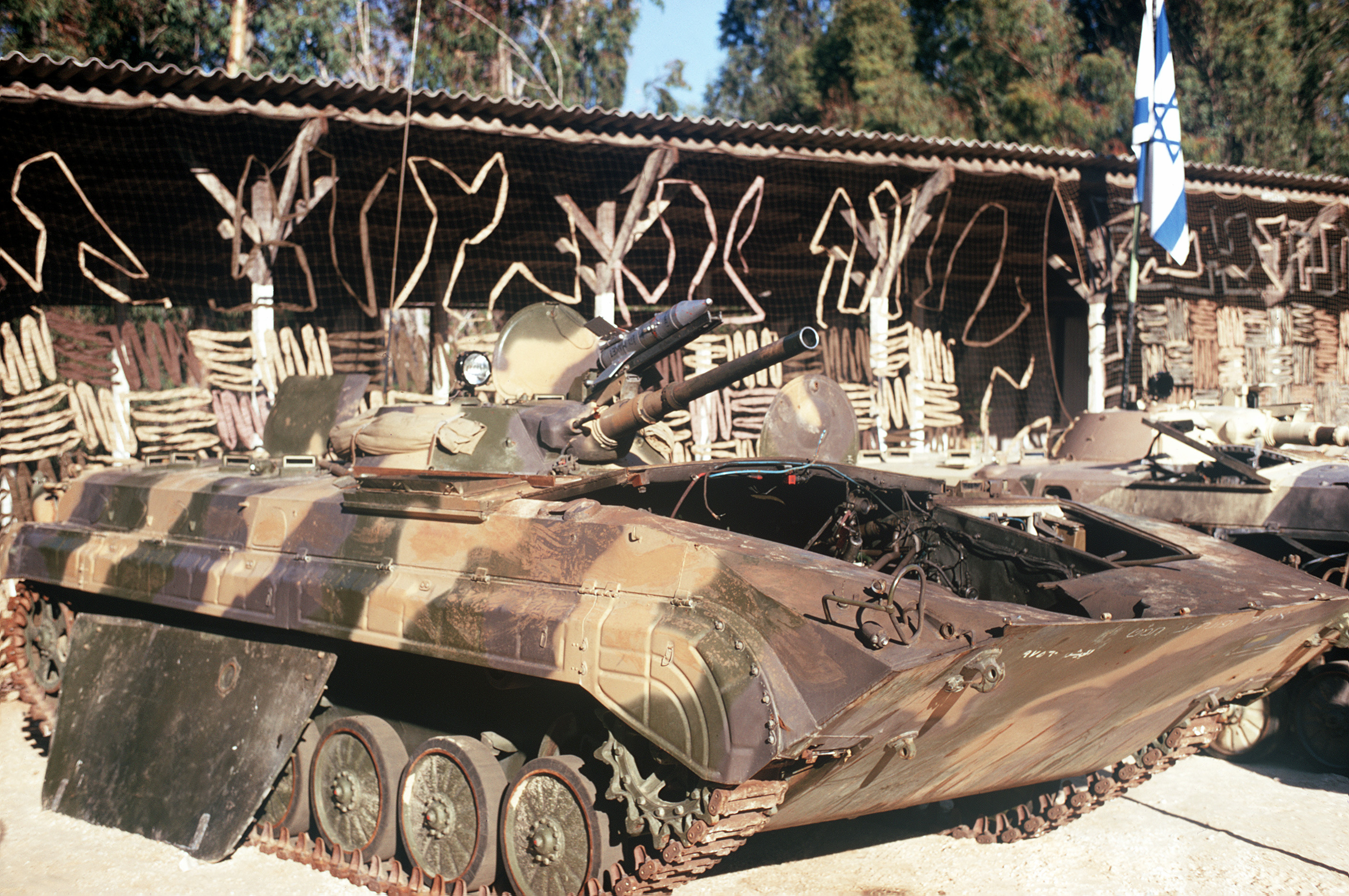
A Syrian BMP-1 captured by Israeli forces

Starting on 9 October, the Soviet Union began supplying Egypt and Syria by air and by sea. The Soviets airlifted 12,500–15,000 tons of supplies, of which 6,000 tons went to Egypt, 3,750 tons went to Syria and 575 tons went to Iraq. General Shazly, the former Egyptian chief of staff, said that more than half of the airlifted Soviet hardware actually went to Syria. According to Ze'ev Schiff, Arab losses were so high and the attrition rate so great that equipment was taken directly from Soviet and Warsaw Pact stores to supply the airlift. Antonov An-12 and An-22 aircraft flew over 900 missions during the airlift.

The Soviets supplied another 63,000 tons, mainly to Syria, by means of a sealift by 30 October. Historian Gamal Hammad asserts that 400 T-55 and T-62 tanks supplied by the sealift were directed towards replacing Syrian losses, transported from Odessa on the Black Sea to the Syrian port of Latakia. Hammad claimed that Egypt did not receive any tanks from the Soviets. The sealift may have included Soviet nuclear weapons, which were not unloaded but kept in Alexandria harbor until November to counter the Israeli nuclear preparations, which Soviet satellites had detected. Soviet intelligence informed Egypt that Israel had armed three nuclear weapons.

American concern over possible evidence of nuclear warheads for the Soviet Scud missiles in Egypt contributed to Washington's decision to go to DEFCON 3. According to documents declassified in 2016, the move to DEFCON 3 was motivated by CIA reports indicating that the Soviet Union had sent a ship to Egypt carrying nuclear weapons along with two other amphibious vessels.

==== Soviet active aid ====
On the Golan front, Syrian forces received direct support from Soviet technicians and military personnel. At the start of the war, there were an estimated 2,000 Soviet personnel in Syria, of whom 1,000 were serving in Syrian air defense units. Soviet technicians repaired damaged tanks, SAMs and radar equipment, assembled fighter jets that arrived via the sealift, and drove tanks supplied by the sealift from ports to Damascus. On both the Golan and Sinai fronts, Soviet military personnel retrieved abandoned Israeli military equipment for shipment to Moscow.

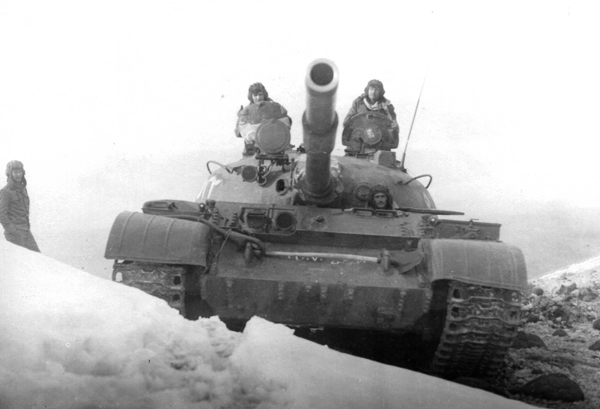
T-62 tank without standard Syrian camouflage, newly supplied by the Soviet Union

Soviet advisors were reportedly present in Syrian command posts "at every echelon, from battalion up, including supreme headquarters". Some Soviet military personnel went into battle with the Syrians, and it was estimated that 20 were killed in action and more were wounded. In July 1974, Israeli Defense Minister Shimon Peres informed the Knesset that high-ranking Soviet officers had been killed on the Syrian front during the war. There were strong rumors that a handful were taken prisoner, but this was denied. However, it was noted that certain Soviet Jews were allowed to emigrate just after the war, leading to suspicions of a covert exchange. The Observer wrote that seven Soviets in uniform were taken prisoner after surrendering when the Israelis overran their bunker. The Israelis reportedly took the prisoners to Ramat David Airbase for interrogation, and treated the incident with great secrecy.

Soviet fighter pilots stationed in Egypt as advisors and instructors may have participated in combat operations. There are several references to Soviet personnel being captured which were never officially confirmed, including a US State Department mention of a report from an Israeli Air Force pilot which said that two Soviet MiG pilots had been captured, and the account of an Israeli paratrooper reservist who said that while mopping up bunkers near Suez City, his force captured four or five Soviet officers. Israeli officers who reported great difficulty in command and control due to jamming of their radio frequencies attributed the improved jamming capabilities they were facing to the Soviets. According to Gideon Remez and Isabella Ginor, Soviet Spetsnaz commandos twice conducted raids behind Israeli lines on the Egyptian front in the early days of the war and captured two Israeli Centurion tanks after killing their crews so that their upgraded guns could be studied.

Israeli military intelligence reported that Soviet-piloted MiG-25 Foxbat interceptor/reconnaissance aircraft overflew the Canal Zone.

==== Soviet intervention threat ====
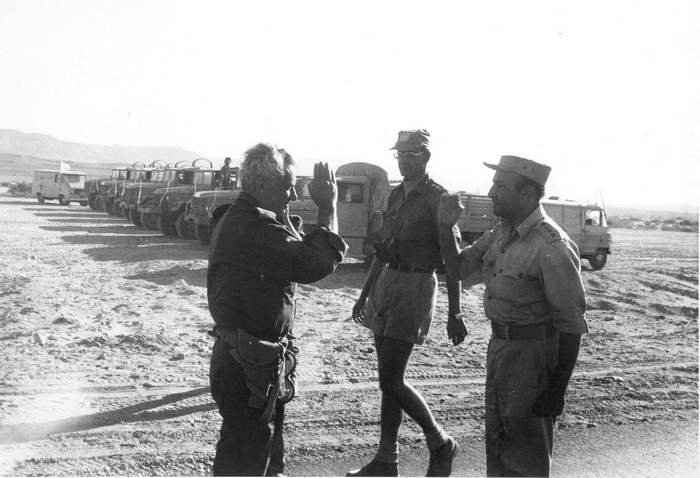
24 October. A UN-arranged meeting between IDF Lt. Gen. Haim Bar-Lev and Egyptian Brigadier General Bashir Sharif in Sinai.

On 9 October, the Soviet cultural center in Damascus was damaged during an IAF airstrike, and two days later, the Soviet merchant ship Ilya Mechnikov was sunk by the Israeli Navy during a battle off Syria. The Soviets condemned Israeli actions, and there were calls within the government for military retaliation. The Soviets ultimately reacted by deploying two destroyers off the Syrian coast. Soviet warships in the Mediterranean were authorized to open fire on Israeli combatants approaching Soviet convoys and transports. There were several recorded instances of Soviet ships exchanging fire with Israeli forces. In particular, the Soviet minesweeper Rulevoi and the medium landing ship SDK-137, guarding Soviet transport ships at the Syrian port of Latakia, fired on approaching Israeli jets.

During the cease-fire, Henry Kissinger mediated a series of exchanges with the Egyptians, Israelis and the Soviets. On 24 October, Sadat publicly appealed for American and Soviet contingents to oversee the ceasefire; it was quickly rejected in a White House statement. Kissinger also met with Soviet Ambassador Dobrynin to discuss convening a peace conference with Geneva as the venue. Later in the evening (9:35 pm) of 24–25 October, Brezhnev sent Nixon a "very urgent" letter.

In that letter, Brezhnev began by noting that Israel was continuing to violate the ceasefire and it posed a challenge to both the U.S. and USSR. He stressed the need to "implement" the ceasefire resolution and "invited" the U.S. to join the Soviets "to compel observance of the cease-fire without delay". He then threatened "I will say it straight that if you find it impossible to act jointly with us in this matter, we should be faced with the necessity urgently to consider taking appropriate steps unilaterally. We cannot allow arbitrariness on the part of Israel."

Kissinger immediately passed the message to White House Chief of Staff Alexander Haig, who met with Nixon for 20 minutes around 10:30 pm, and reportedly empowered Kissinger to take any necessary action. Kissinger immediately called a meeting of senior officials, including Haig, Defense Secretary James Schlesinger and CIA Director William Colby. The Watergate scandal had reached its apex, and Nixon was so agitated and discomposed that they decided to handle the matter without him:

When Kissinger asked Haig whether [Nixon] should be wakened, the White House chief of staff replied firmly 'No.' Haig clearly shared Kissinger's feelings that Nixon was in no shape to make weighty decisions.

The meeting produced a conciliatory response, which was sent (in Nixon's name) to Brezhnev. At the same time, it was decided to increase the DEFCON from four to three. Lastly, they approved a message to Sadat (again, in Nixon's name) asking him to drop his request for Soviet assistance, and threatening that if the Soviets were to intervene, so would the United States.

The Soviets placed seven airborne divisions on alert and airlift was marshaled to transport them to the Middle East. An airborne command post was set up in the southern Soviet Union, and several air force units were also alerted. "Reports also indicated that at least one of the divisions and a squadron of transport planes had been moved from the Soviet Union to an airbase in Yugoslavia".

The Soviets quickly detected the increased American defense condition, and were astonished and bewildered at the response. "Who could have imagined the Americans would be so easily frightened," said Nikolai Podgorny. "It is not reasonable to become engaged in a war with the United States because of Egypt and Syria," said Premier Alexei Kosygin, while KGB chief Yuri Andropov added that "We shall not unleash the Third World War." The letter from the U.S. cabinet arrived during the meeting. Brezhnev decided that the Americans were too nervous, and that the best course of action would be to wait to reply. The next morning, the Egyptians agreed to the American suggestion, and dropped their request for assistance from the Soviets, bringing the crisis to an end.

==== Other countries ====
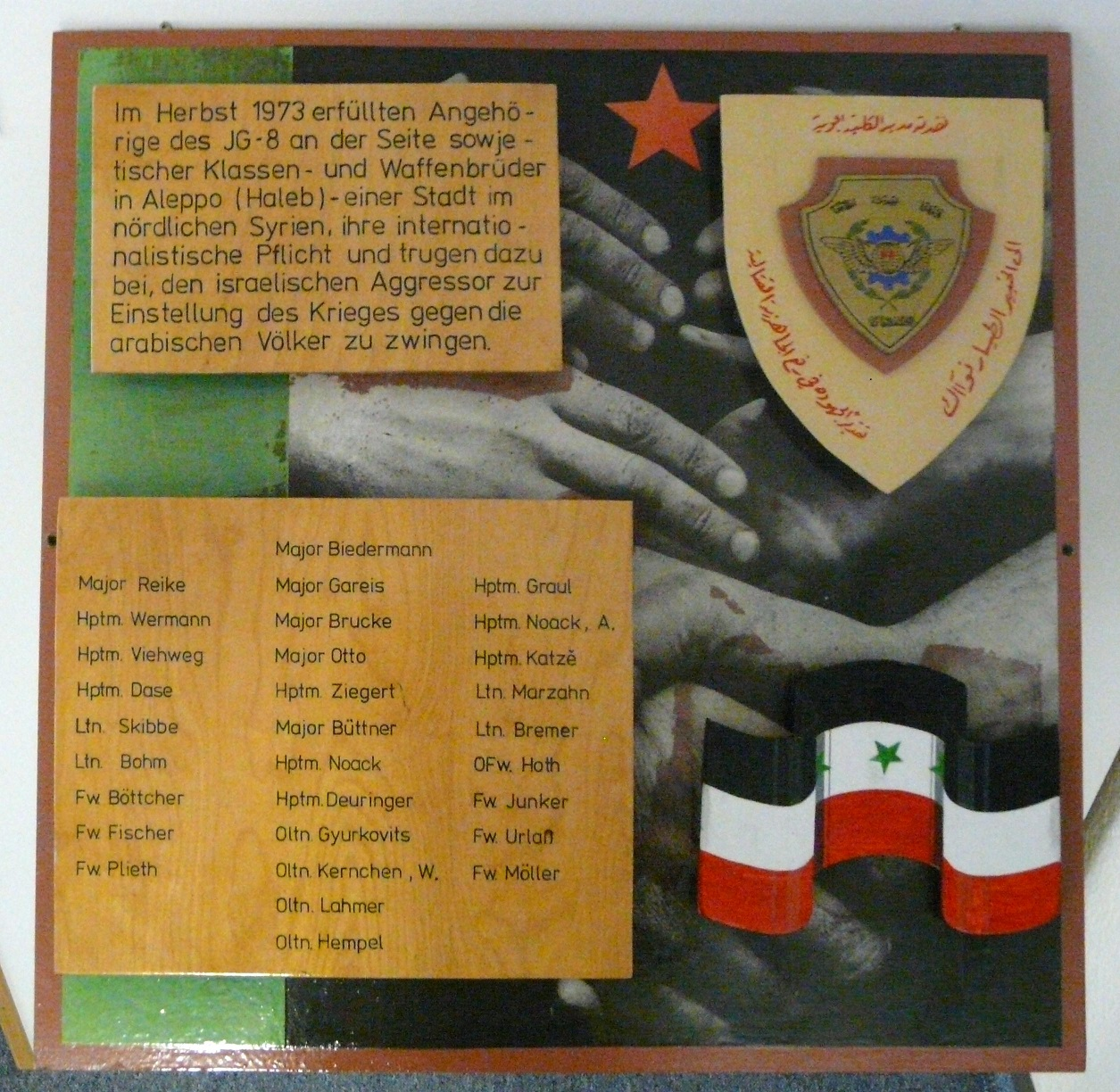
A plaque commemorating the supply of eight East German Air Force MiG-21s to Syria during the war, on display at the Flugplatzmuseum Cottbus

In total, Arab countries added up to 100,000 troops to Egypt and Syria's frontline ranks, and about 20,000 troops stationed in Jordanian territory. Besides Egypt, Syria, Jordan, and Iraq, several other Arab states were also involved in this war, providing additional weapons and financing. In addition to its forces in Syria, Iraq sent a single Hawker Hunter squadron to Egypt. The squadron quickly gained a reputation amongst Egyptian field commanders for its skill in air support, particularly in anti-armor strikes.

However, nearly all Arab reinforcements came without logistical plans or support, expecting their hosts to supply them, and in several cases causing logistical problems. On the Syrian front, a lack of coordination between Arab forces led to several instances of friendly fire.

- Algeria sent a squadron each of MiG-21s and Su-7s to Egypt, which arrived at the front between 9 and 11 October. It also sent an armored brigade of 150 tanks, the advance elements of which began to arrive on 17 October, but reached the front only on 24 October, too late to participate in the fighting. After the war, during the first days of November, Algeria deposited around US$200 million with the Soviet Union to finance arms purchases for Egypt and Syria. Algerian fighter jets, however, did participate in attacks together with Egyptians and Iraqis.
- East German Communist Party leader Erich Honecker directed the shipment of 75,000 grenades, 30,000 mines, 62 tanks and 12 fighter jets to Syria.
- 20 North Korean pilots and 19 non-combat personnel were sent to Egypt. According to Shlomo Aloni, the last aerial engagement on the Egyptian front, which took place on 6 December, saw Israeli F-4s engage North Korean-piloted MiG-21s. The Israelis shot down one MiG, and another was mistakenly shot down by Egyptian air defenses. Egyptian sources said that the North Koreans suffered no losses but claimed no aerial victories in their engagements.
- According to Chengappa, several Pakistan Air Force pilots flew combat missions in Syrian aircraft, and shot down one Israeli fighter.
- Libya, which had forces stationed in Egypt before the outbreak of the war, provided one armored brigade and two squadrons of Mirage V fighters, of which one squadron was to be piloted by the Egyptian Air Force and the other by Libyan pilots. Only Egyptian-manned squadrons participated in the war. The Libyan armored brigade stationed in Egypt never took an active part in the war. Libya also sent financial aid.
- Saudi Arabia had a force of 20,000 Saudi soldiers that remained in Jordanian territory since 1967 to provide support and assistance as needed for a total of 10 years. Additionally, the Saudis sent 3,000 soldiers to Syria, bolstered by a light armored battalion of Panhard AML-90 vehicles. One of the AMLs was later captured by the Israelis near Golan Heights and displayed to the media as proof of Saudi involvement. The Saudi armor was deployed primarily in rearguard actions but also performed active reconnaissance for the Iraqi and Jordanian expeditionary forces between 16 and 19 October. During that time, it participated in two major engagements and the IDF claimed that most of the armoured car battalion was destroyed. The Saudis acknowledged only minor losses, including the loss of 4 AMLs.
- Kuwait dispatched 3,000 soldiers to Syria. These arrived with additional Jordanian and Iraqi reinforcements in time for a new Syrian offensive scheduled for 23 October, which was later cancelled. Kuwaiti troops were also sent to Egypt. Kuwait also provided financial aid.
- Morocco sent one infantry brigade to Egypt and one armored regiment to Syria. Six Moroccan troops were killed in action on the Syrian front.
- Tunisia sent 1,000–2,000 soldiers to Egypt, where they were stationed in the Nile Delta and some of them were stationed to defend Port Said.
- Lebanon enabled Palestinian artillery units to operate from its territory and Lebanese radar operators guided Syrian air force aircraft. Lebanon however did not directly take part in the war.
- Sudan deployed a 3,500-strong infantry brigade to Egypt. It arrived on 28 October, too late to participate in the war.

Non-state participants:

- An infantry brigade composed of Palestinians was in Egypt before the outbreak of the war.

=== Palestinian attacks from Lebanese territory ===
During the course of the war, Palestinian militias from southern Lebanon launched several attacks on Israeli border communities. All of the attempts to infiltrate Israel failed, and 23 militants were killed and four were captured during the clashes. Most of the activity was focused on Katyusha rocket and anti-tank missile fire on Israeli border communities. In the attacks some civilians were injured, mostly lightly and damage was made to property. On 10 October, after Palestinian militants fired some 40 rockets on Israeli communities, Chief of Staff David Elazar and chief of the Northern Command Yitzhak Hofi requested permission to send a force into Lebanon to root out Palestinian militants, but the request was declined by Defense Minister Moshe Dayan, who did not want to divert forces from the Syrian front.

== UN-backed ceasefire ==
A 1974 news report about warfare on the Golan prior to the May disengagement accords

On 24 October, the UNSC passed Resolution 339, serving as a renewed call for all parties to adhere to the ceasefire terms established in Resolution 338. Most heavy fighting on the Egyptian front ended by 26 October, but clashes along the ceasefire lines and a few airstrikes on the Third Army took place. With some Israeli advances taking place, Kissinger threatened to support a UN withdrawal resolution, but before Israel could respond, Egyptian national security advisor Hafez Ismail sent Kissinger a stunning message –Egypt was willing to enter into direct talks with Israel, provided that it agree to both allowing non-military supplies to reach the Third Army and to a complete ceasefire.

About noon on 25 October, Kissinger appeared before the press at the State Department. He described the various stages of the crisis and the evolution of U.S. policy. He reviewed the first two weeks of the crisis and the nuclear alert, reiterated opposition to U.S. and Soviet troops in the area and more strongly opposed unilateral Soviet moves. He then reviewed the prospects for a peace agreement, which he termed "quite promising", and had conciliatory words for Israel, Egypt and even the USSR. Kissinger concluded his remarks by spelling out the principles of a new U.S. policy toward the Arab–Israeli conflict saying:

Our position is that ... the conditions that produced this war were clearly intolerable to the Arab nations and that in the process of negotiations it will be necessary to make substantial concessions. The problem will be to relate the Arab concern for the sovereignty over the territories to the Israeli concern for secure boundaries. We believe that the process of negotiations between the parties is an essential component of this.

Quandt considers, "It was a brilliant performance, one of his most impressive." One hour later the United Nations Security Council adopted Resolution 340. This time the ceasefire held, and the fourth Arab–Israeli war was over.

== Disengagement ==
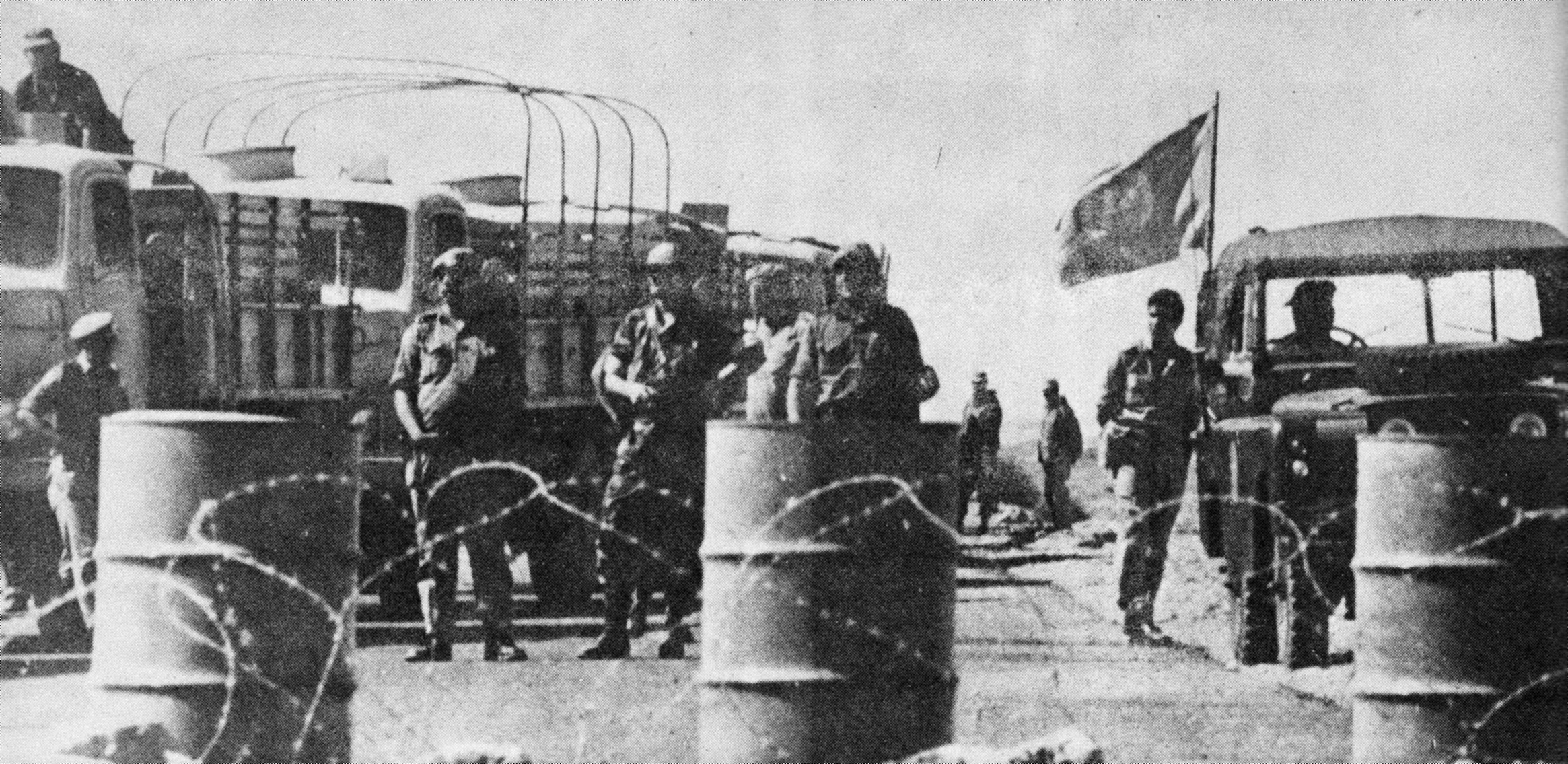
UN Emergency Forces at Kilometre 101, November 1973

Disengagement talks took place on 28 October 1973, at "Kilometre 101" between Israeli Major General Aharon Yariv and Egyptian Major General Abdel Ghani el-Gamasy. Ultimately, Kissinger took the proposal to Sadat, who agreed. United Nations checkpoints were brought in to replace Israeli ones, nonmilitary supplies were allowed to pass, and prisoners-of-war were to be exchanged.

A summit conference in Geneva followed in December 1973. All parties to the war—Israel, Syria, Jordan and Egypt—were invited to a joint effort by the Soviet Union and the United States to finally usher peace between the Arabs and Israelis. This conference was recognized by UN Security Council Resolution 344 and was based on the Resolution 338, calling for a "just and durable peace". Nevertheless, the conference was forced to adjourn on 9 January 1974, as Syria refused attendance.

After the failed conference, Henry Kissinger started conducting shuttle diplomacy, meeting with Israel and the Arab states directly. The first concrete result of this was the initial military disengagement agreement, signed by Israel and Egypt on 18 January 1974. The agreement commonly known as Sinai I had the official name of Sinai Separation of Forces Agreement. Under its terms, Israel agreed to pull back its forces from the areas West of Suez Canal, which it had occupied since the end of hostilities. Moreover, Israeli forces were also pulled back on the length of the whole front to create security zones for Egypt, UN and Israel, each roughly ten kilometres wide. Thus Israel gave up its advances reaching beyond the Suez canal, but it still held nearly all of Sinai. It became the first of many such Land for Peace agreements where Israel gave up territory in exchange for treaties.

On the Syrian front, skirmishes and artillery exchanges continued taking place. Shuttle diplomacy by Henry Kissinger eventually produced a disengagement agreement on 31 May 1974, based on exchange of prisoners-of-war, Israeli withdrawal to the Purple Line and the establishment of a UN buffer zone. The agreement ended the skirmishes and exchanges of artillery fire that had occurred frequently along the Israeli-Syrian ceasefire line. The UN Disengagement and Observer Force (UNDOF) was established as a peacekeeping force in the Golan. On June 26, president Hafez al-Assad raised the national flag over the city of Quneitra.

The peace discussion at the end of the war was the first time that Arab and Israeli officials met for direct public discussions since the aftermath of the 1948 war.

== Reactions ==
=== Response in Israel ===
After the war, it had a stunning effect on the population in Israel. Following their victory in the Six-Day War, the Israeli military had become complacent. The shock and sudden reversals that occurred at the beginning of the war inflicted a terrible psychological blow to the Israelis, who had hitherto experienced no serious military challenges.

A protest against the Israeli government started four months after the war ended. It was led by Motti Ashkenazi, commander of Budapest, the northernmost of the Bar-Lev forts and the only one during the war not to be captured by the Egyptians. Anger against the Israeli government (and Dayan in particular) was high. Shimon Agranat, President of the Israeli Supreme Court, was asked to lead an inquiry, the Agranat Commission, into the events leading up to the war and the setbacks of the first few days.

Shmuel Gonen, commander of the Southern front, was recommended by the initial report to be relieved of active duty. He was forced to leave the army after the publication of the Commission's final report, on 30 January 1975, which found that "he failed to fulfill his duties adequately, and bears much of the responsibility for the dangerous situation in which our troops were caught."

Rather than quieting public discontent, the report—which "had stressed that it was judging the ministers' responsibility for security failings, not their parliamentary responsibility, which fell outside its mandate"—inflamed it. Although it had absolved Meir and Dayan of all responsibility, public calls for their resignations (especially Dayan's) intensified.

On 11 April 1974, Golda Meir resigned. Her cabinet followed suit, including Dayan, who had previously offered to resign twice and was turned down both times by Meir. A new government was seated in June and Yitzhak Rabin, who had spent most of the war as an advisor to Elazar in an unofficial capacity, became prime minister.

=== Response in Egypt ===
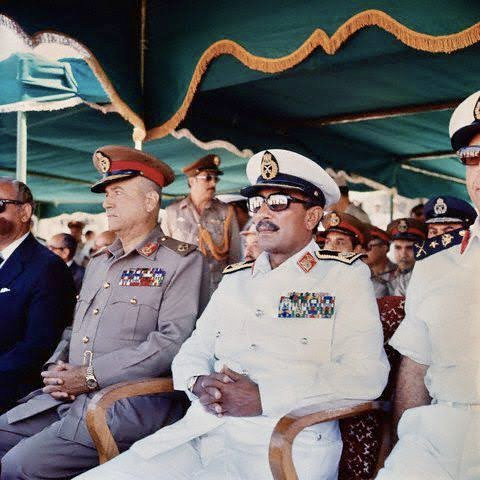
Sadat and Ahmad Ismail Ali attending the re-opening ceremony of Suez Canal after the Yom Kippur war, June 5, 1975

General Shazly had angered Sadat for advocating the withdrawal of Egyptian forces from Sinai to meet the Israeli incursion on the West Bank of the Canal. Six weeks after the war, he was relieved of command and forced out of the army, ultimately going into political exile for years. Upon his return to Egypt, he was placed under house arrest.

Following his release, he advocated the formation of a "Supreme High Committee" modeled after Israel's Agranat Commission in order to "probe, examine and analyze" the performance of Egyptian forces and the command decisions made during the war, but his requests were completely ignored. He published a book, banned in Egypt, that described Egypt's military failings and the sharp disagreements he had with Ismail and Sadat in connection with the prosecution of the war.

The commanders of the Second and Third Armies, Generals Khalil and Wasel, were also dismissed from the army. The commander of the Egyptian Second Army at the start of the war, General Mamoun, suffered a heart attack, or, alternatively, a breakdown, after the Egyptian defeat during the 14 October Sinai tank battle, and was replaced by General Khalil.

=== Response in Syria ===
In Syria, Colonel Rafik Halawi, the Druze commander of an infantry brigade that had collapsed during the Israeli breakthrough, was executed before the war even ended. He was given a quick hearing and sentenced to death; his execution was immediate. Military historian Zeev Schiff referred to him as Syria's "sacrificial lamb". The Syrians however offered vehement denials that Halawi was executed and expended great efforts trying to debunk the allegation. They said he was killed in battle with Israel and threatened severe punishment to anyone repeating the allegation of execution.

Their concern stemmed from a desire to maintain Syrian Druze loyalty to Assad's regime and prevent Syrian Druze from siding with their co-religionists in Israel. On 7 July 1974, Halawi's remains were removed from a Syrian military hospital and he was interred in Damascus at the "Cemetery of the Martyrs of the October War" in the presence of many Syrian dignitaries. One analyst noted that the presence of so many high-level officials was unusual and attributed it to Syrian efforts to quell any suggestion of execution.

=== Response in the Soviet Union ===
According to Anatoly Chernyaev, on 4 November 1973, Soviet leader Leonid Brezhnev said:

We have offered them (the Arabs) a sensible way for so many years. But no, they wanted to fight. Fine! We gave them technology, the latest, the kind even Vietnam didn't have. They had double superiority in tanks and aircraft, triple in artillery, and in air defense and anti-tank weapons they had absolute supremacy. And what? Once again they were beaten. Once again they scrammed [sic]. Once again they screamed for us to come save them. Sadat woke me up in the middle of the night twice over the phone, "Save me!" He demanded to send Soviet troops, and immediately! No! We are not going to fight for them.

=== Arab oil embargo ===
In response to U.S. support of Israel, the Arab members of the Organization of the Petroleum Exporting Countries (OPEC), led by King Faisal of Saudi Arabia, decided to reduce oil production by 5% per month on 17 October. On 19 October, President Nixon authorized a major allocation of arms supplies and $2.2 billion in appropriations for Israel. In response, Saudi Arabia declared an embargo against the United States, later joined by other oil exporters and extended against the Netherlands and other countries, causing the 1973 energy crisis.

== Aftermath ==
Historians differ in their assessments of the war's military outcome: some describe it as an Israeli victory, (Note: See) others as an Egyptian victory, and others as a military stalemate. (Note: See)

=== 1973 oil crisis ===
Following the war, the Organization of Arab Petroleum Exporting Countries (OAPEC) announced that it was implementing a total oil embargo against countries that had supported Israel at any point during the 1973 Yom Kippur War, leading to the 1973 oil crisis.

=== Egyptian–Israeli disengagement agreement ===
Another Egyptian–Israeli disengagement agreement, the Sinai Interim Agreement, was signed in Geneva on 4 September 1975, and was commonly known as Sinai II. This agreement led Israel to withdraw from another 20–40 km with UN forces buffering the vacated area. After the agreement, Israel still held more than two-thirds of Sinai, which would prove to be a valuable bargaining chip in the coming negotiations.

=== Egyptian–Israeli Camp David Accords ===
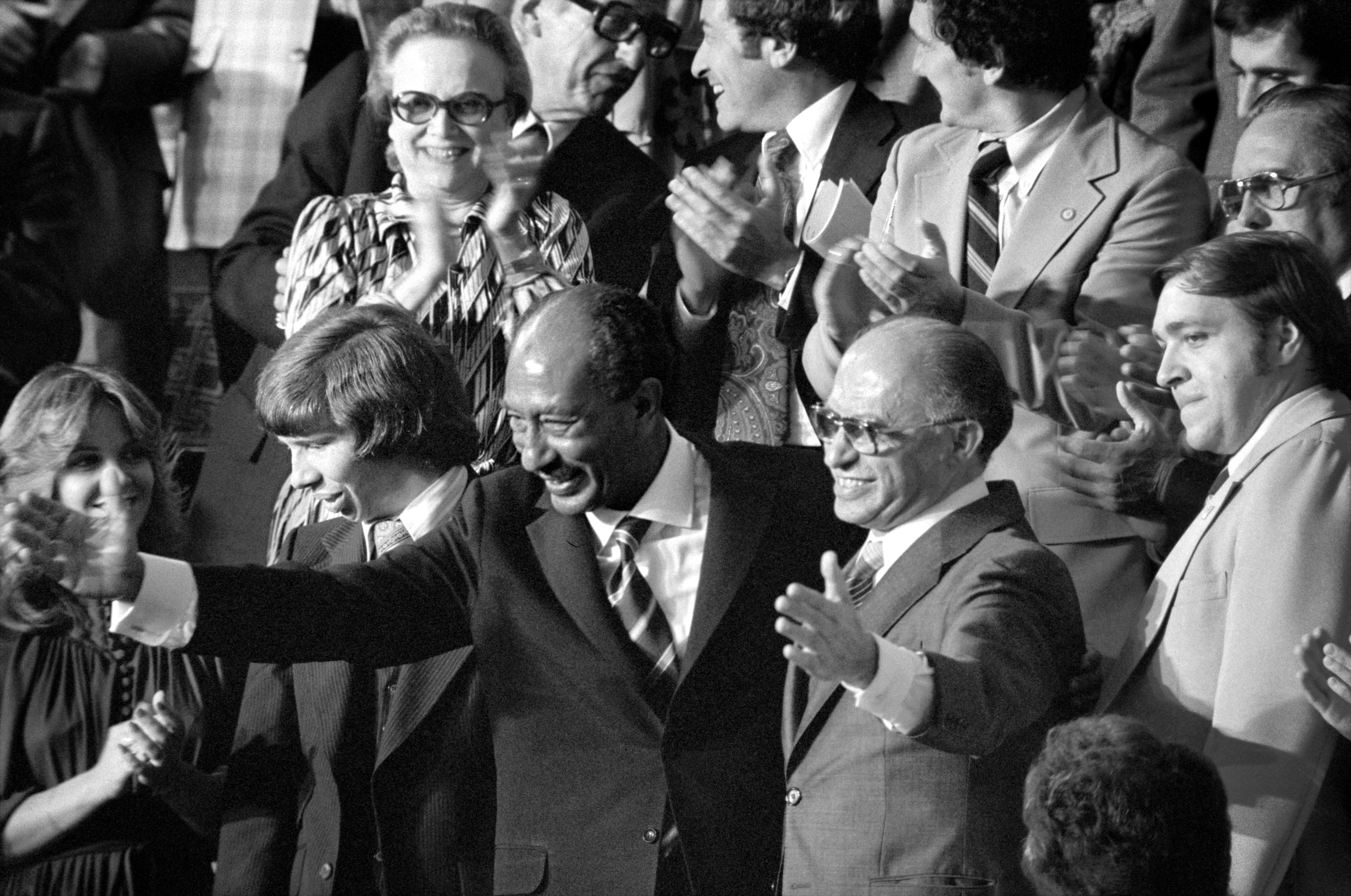
Egyptian President Anwar Sadat and Israeli Prime Minister Menachem Begin acknowledge applause during a joint session of Congress in Washington, D.C., during which President Jimmy Carter announced the results of the Camp David Accords, 18 September 1978.

The Yom Kippur War upset the status quo in the Middle East, and the war served as a direct antecedent of the 1978 Camp David Accords. The impetus for the talks came when United States President Jimmy Carter invited both Sadat and Begin to a summit at Camp David to negotiate a final peace. The talks took place from 5–17 September 1978. Ultimately, the talks succeeded, and Israel and Egypt signed the Egypt–Israel Peace Treaty in 1979. Israel subsequently withdrew its troops and settlers from the Sinai, in exchange for normal relations with Egypt and a lasting peace, with the last Israeli troops exiting on 26 April 1982.

The Accords resulted in the Egypt–Israel peace treaty, the first ever between Israel and an Arab state. According to George Friedman, the war gave the Israelis increased respect for the Egyptian military and decreased their confidence in their own, and caused the Israelis to be uncertain whether they could defeat Egypt in the event of another war. At the same time, the Egyptians recognized that despite their improvements, the Israelis survived in the end, and became doubtful that they could ever defeat Israel militarily. Therefore, a negotiated settlement made sense to both sides. Many in the Arab world were outraged at Egypt's peace with Israel. Sadat, in particular, became deeply unpopular both in the Arab world and in his own country. Egypt was suspended from the Arab League until 1989. Until then, Egypt had been "at the helm of the Arab world".

=== U.S. military doctrine ===
U.S. military studies of the Yom Kippur War played a major role in shaping U.S. military doctrine in subsequent decades, particularly because the U.S. Army's Training and Doctrine Command (TRADOC) was established only three months before the onset of the war. U.S. Army Chief of Staff Gen. Creighton Abrams, TRADOC Commander Gen. William E. DePuy, and other Army leaders saw Israel's strategic and doctrinal conditions between 1967 and 1973 as similar to NATO's position in Europe, and thus they undertook a deep study of Israel's warfighting in 1973 to derive insights for war against the Soviet Union.

Soon after the war, U.S. Army civilian analysts and senior officers such as Gen. Donn A. Starry visited the IDF and compiled "lessons" for the Army to learn after the war. These lessons covered the improved lethality and accuracy of anti-tank and anti-air missiles, the importance of superior training for tank crews, the necessity of cover and concealment during movement, and the importance of combined arms warfare. In 1976, TRADOC revised the Army's FM 100–5 Operations field manual and promoted an operational concept of "Active Defense", with a strong emphasis on tactical proficiency tied to the performance of advanced weapons systems like those observed in the Yom Kippur War fighting. Gen. DePuy visited Israel in 1976, where he toured Yom Kippur War battlefields and observed Israeli field training. He used these insights to encourage reforms of U.S. Army training to ease the Army's transition to a more professional force after the end of the military draft in 1973.

In May 1977, Gen. Starry (soon to succeed DePuy as TRADOC commander) returned to Israel and toured Yom Kippur War sites on the Golan Heights, guided by Raful Eitan and Moshe Peled. Starry used his observations to address problems left unaddressed by the Active Defense doctrine, such as how best to fight follow-on echelons after the first battle. TRADOC's 1982 revision of FM 100–5 replaced Active Defense with an offense-oriented operational doctrine known as AirLand Battle, which formed the basis of the American plan for Operation Desert Storm in 1991.

== Casualties ==
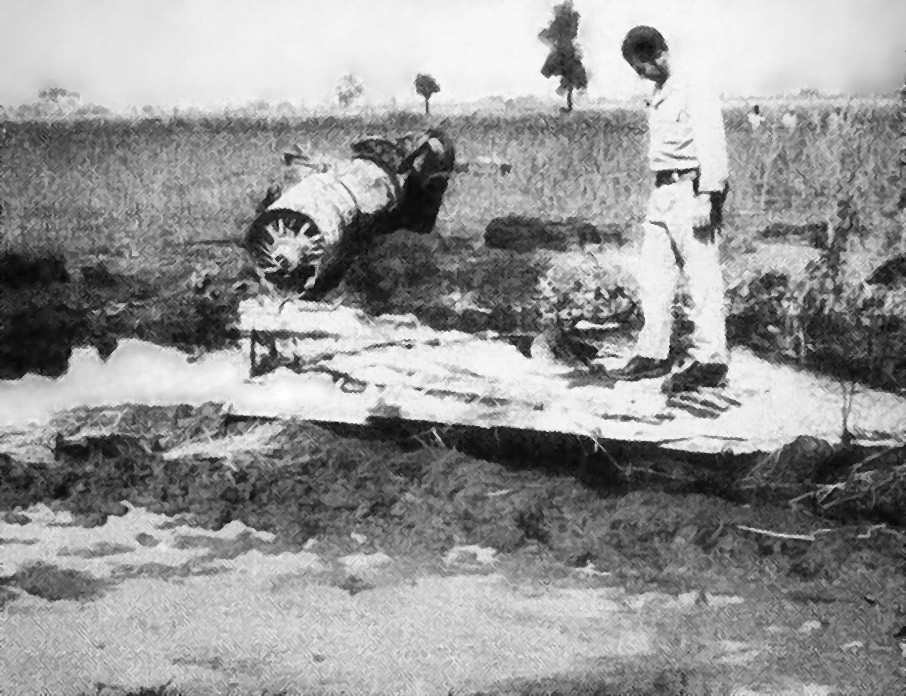
A downed Israeli Mirage

Israel suffered between 2,521 and 2,800 killed in action. An additional 7,250 to 8,800 soldiers were wounded. Some 293 Israelis were captured. Approximately 400–800 Israeli tanks were destroyed. Another 600 were disabled but returned to service after repairs. A major Israeli advantage, noted by many observers, was their ability to quickly return damaged tanks to combat.

The Israeli Air Force lost 102–387 airplanes. Around 40% of these airplanes were shot down during the first three days of the war. IAF losses per combat sortie were less than in the Six-Day War of 1967.

Arab casualties were known to be much higher than Israel's. Precise figures are difficult to ascertain as Egypt and Syria never disclosed official figures. The lowest casualty estimate is 8,000 (5,000 Egyptian and 3,000 Syrian) killed and 18,000 wounded. The highest estimate is 18,500 (15,000 Egyptian and 3,500 Syrian) killed. Most estimates lie somewhere in between the two, with the Insight Team of London's The Sunday Times putting combined Egyptian and Syrian losses at 16,000 killed. Another source cites a figure of some 15,000 dead and 35,000 wounded. U.S. estimates placed Egyptian casualties at 13,000. Iraq lost 278 killed and 898 wounded, while Jordan suffered 23 killed and 77 wounded. Morocco had 170 killed and 18 Kuwaitis were killed. Some 8,372 Egyptians, 392 Syrians, 13 Iraqis and 6 Moroccans were taken prisoner.

Arab tank losses amounted to 2,250 though Gawrych cites a figure of 2,300. About 400 of these fell into Israeli hands in good working order and were incorporated into Israeli service. Between 341 and 514 Arab aircraft were shot down. According to Herzog, 334 of these aircraft were shot down by the IAF in air-to-air combat for the loss of only five Israeli planes. The Sunday Times Insight Team notes Arab aircraft losses of 450. Nineteen Arab naval vessels, including 10 missile boats, were sunk for no Israeli losses.

== Atrocities ==
=== Syrian atrocities ===
Syria ignored the Geneva Conventions and many Israeli prisoners of war were tortured or killed. Advancing Israeli forces, re-capturing land taken by the Syrians early in the war, came across the bodies of 28 Israeli soldiers who had been blindfolded with their hands bound and summarily executed. In a December 1973 address to the National Assembly, Syrian Defense Minister Mustafa Tlass stated that he had awarded one soldier the Medal of the Republic for killing 28 Israeli prisoners with an axe, decapitating three of them and eating the flesh of one of his victims.

The Syrians employed brutal interrogation techniques utilizing electric shocks to the genitals. A number of Israeli soldiers taken prisoner on Mount Hermon were executed. Near the village of Hushniye, the Syrians captured 11 administrative personnel from the Golan Heights Force, all of whom were later found dead, blindfolded, and with their hands tied behind their backs. Within Hushniye, seven Israeli prisoners were found dead, and another three were executed at Tel Zohar. Syrian prisoners who fell into Israeli captivity confirmed that their comrades killed IDF prisoners.

A soldier from the Moroccan contingent fighting with Syrian forces was found to be carrying a sack filled with the body parts of Israeli soldiers which he intended to take home as souvenirs. The bodies of Israeli prisoners who were killed were stripped of their uniforms and found clad only in their underpants, and Syrian soldiers removed their dog tags to make identification of the bodies more difficult.

Some Israeli POWs reported having their fingernails ripped out while others were described as being turned into human ashtrays as their Syrian guards burned them with lit cigarettes. A report submitted by the chief medical officer of the Israeli army notes that, "the vast majority of (Israeli) prisoners were exposed during their imprisonment to severe physical and mental torture. The usual methods of torture were beatings aimed at various parts of the body, electric shocks, wounds deliberately inflicted on the ears, burns on the legs, suspension in painful positions and other methods."

Following the conclusion of hostilities, Syria would not release the names of prisoners it was holding to the International Committee of the Red Cross and in fact, did not even acknowledge holding any prisoners despite the fact they were publicly exhibited by the Syrians for television crews. The Syrians, having been thoroughly defeated by Israel, were attempting to use their captives as their sole bargaining chip in the post-war negotiations. One of the most famous Israeli POWs was Avraham Lanir, an Israeli pilot who bailed out over Syria and was taken prisoner. Lanir died under Syrian interrogation. When his body was returned in 1974, it exhibited signs of torture.

=== Egyptian atrocities ===
Israeli historian Aryeh Yitzhaki estimated that the Egyptians killed about 200 Israeli soldiers who had surrendered. Yitzhaki based this estimate on army documents. In addition, dozens of Israeli prisoners were beaten and otherwise mistreated in Egyptian captivity.

Individual Israeli soldiers gave testimony of witnessing comrades killed after surrendering to the Egyptians, or seeing the bodies of Israeli soldiers found blindfolded with their hands tied behind their backs. Avi Yaffe, a radioman serving on the Bar-Lev Line, reported hearing calls from other soldiers that the Egyptians were killing anyone who tried to surrender, and also obtained recordings of soldiers who were saved from Egyptian firing squads.

Issachar Ben-Gavriel, an Israeli soldier who was captured at the Suez Canal, said that out of his group of 19 soldiers who surrendered, 11 were shot dead. Another soldier said that a soldier in his unit was captured alive but beaten to death during interrogation. Photographic evidence of such executions exists, though some of it has never been made public. Photos were also found of Israeli prisoners who were photographed alive in Egyptian captivity, but were returned to Israel dead.

In 2013, the Israeli government declassified documents detailing Egyptian atrocities against prisoners of war, recording the deaths of at least 86 Israeli POWs at the hands of Egyptian forces. In an interview Israeli major general Herzl Shafir recalled instances of these accounts, including that of an injured prisoner who was murdered when an Egyptian doctor "disconnected him from the oxygen and kept him from getting an intravenous drip." He noted that statistics on the number of people killed was still unclear.

== See also ==
- Armed Forces Day (Egypt)
- Closure of the Suez Canal (1967–1975) – Part of the Six-Day War and Yom Kippur War
- Corrective Movement (Syria) – 1970–2000 reformist program by Hafez al-Assad
- Leninsky Komsomol–class cargo ships – Seven Soviet Union Leninsky Komsomol–class of cargo ships carried military cargo to Syria and Egypt in October and November 1973:
  - SS Bratstvo (1963) – Arrived in Latakia on 20 October 1973
  - SS Fizik Kurchatov – Visited Alexandria twice and Latakia once
- List of Egyptian commanders of the Yom Kippur War
- List of modern conflicts in the Middle East – List of Middle Eastern conflicts since 1914
- Operation Spark (1973) – Deception operation by Syria and Egypt
- SDK 137 – One Soviet Polnocny-class landing ship (built in Gdansk) that participated in open hostilities against Israel and downed at least one Israeli F-4 Phantom
