= 1974 in Israel =

- Decades: 1950s; 1960s; 1970s; 1980s; 1990s
- See also: History of Israel; Timeline of Israeli history; List of years in Israel

Events in the year 1974 in Israel.

== Incumbents ==
- President of Israel – Ephraim Katzir
- Prime Minister of Israel – Golda Meir (Alignment) until 3 June, Yitzhak Rabin (Alignment)
- President of the Supreme Court – Shimon Agranat
- Chief of General Staff – David Elazar until 3 April, Mordechai Gur
- Government of Israel – 15th Government of Israel until 10 March, 16th Government of Israel until 3 June, 17th Government of Israel

== Events ==
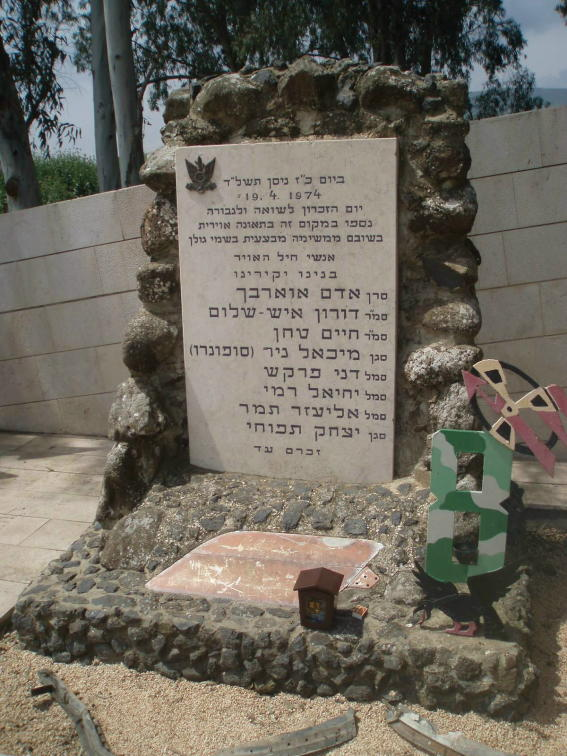
The memorial for the victims of the Mahanayim disaster

- 18 January – Israel and Egypt sign an agreement on disengagement following the Yom Kippur War.
- 1 February – Lillehammer affair: Five Israeli Mossad agents are sentenced in Norway to prison terms for the assassination of Ahmed Bouchiki. The prison terms range from two and a half to five years, although all the agents are eventually released within 22 months and deported back to Israel.
- 5 March – Israel completes its pullback from the west side of the Suez Canal to the east side of the canal, as agreed upon in the Agreement on Disengagement.
- 10 March – Golda Meir presents her third government to the Knesset.
- 1 April – The Agranat Commission publishes its interim report, which calls for the dismissal of the IDF's Chief of Staff Dado Elazar, director of the Israeli Military Intelligence Directorate Eli Zeira and the Chief of the Israeli Southern Command Shmuel Gonen. The interim report states that they were responsible for failure in preparing the army for war, and for the operational and intelligence failures which occurred prior to the Yom Kippur War, which resulted in severe consequences of the war. Nevertheless, the Agranat Commission refuses to give an opinion on the responsibility of the political leadership, Prime Minister Golda Meir and the Minister of Defence Moshe Dayan arguing that this is beyond its scope.
- 6 April – Poogy represents Israel at the Eurovision Song Contest with the song "Natati La Khayay" ("I Gave Her My Life"), achieving seventh place.
- 11 April – Golda Meir resigns from premiership.
- 14 April – The Open University of Israel is founded.
- 15 April – Mordechai Gur is appointed as the tenth Chief of Staff of the Israel Defense Forces.
- 19 April – Mahanayim disaster: Eight Israeli soldiers are killed as a result of a collision between two helicopters over the Mahanayim Airfield.
- 31 May – Israel and Syria sign an agreement on disengagement following the Yom Kippur War.
- 3 June – Yitzhak Rabin presents his cabinet for a Knesset "Vote of Confidence". The 17th Government is approved that day and the members are sworn in.

=== Israeli–Palestinian conflict ===
The most prominent events related to the Israeli–Palestinian conflict which occurred during 1974 include:

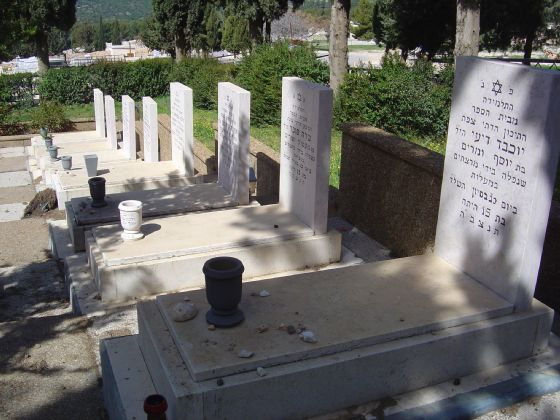
Ma'alot massacre victims in the Safed Cemetery

Notable Palestinian militant operations against Israeli targets

The most prominent Palestinian Arab terror attacks committed against Israelis during 1974 include:

- 11 April – Kiryat Shmona massacre: Three members of the PFLP-GC cross the Israeli border from Lebanon, enter an apartment building in the town of Kiryat Shmona and kill all eighteen residents there, half of whom are children.
- 15 May – Ma'alot massacre: Palestinian militants of the Democratic Front for the Liberation of Palestine cross the Israeli border from Lebanon. They attack a van killing two Israeli Arab women, they enter an apartment building in the town of Ma'alot and kill a couple and their 4-year-old son. After that, the militant squad take over a local school and hold at 105 students and 10 teachers hostage. The hostage-takers demanded the release of 23 Palestinian militants from Israeli prisons, or they would kill the students. On the second day of the standoff, a unit of the elite Golani Brigade stormed the building. During the takeover, the hostage-takers detonated their grenades and shot the children. Ultimately, 25 hostages were killed, including 22 children; 68 more were injured.
- 24–25 June – 1974 Nahariya attack: three Palestinian militant squad infiltrated the coastal city of Nahariya in Israel by sea from Lebanon. During the attack three civilians and one Israeli soldier were killed.
- 8 September – TWA jet with 88 passengers traveling from Tel Aviv to Athens crashed into the Ionian Sea after PFLP militants detonated a bomb hidden in the baggage compartment, killing all the 79 passengers and 9 crew members on board.
- 19 November – 1974 Beit She'an attack: a raid by a squad of Palestinian militants, belonging to the Democratic Front for the Liberation of Palestine militant organization, on the Israeli city of Beit She'an. Four civilians were killed during the event and more than 20 civilians were injured.

Notable Israeli military operations against Palestinian militancy targets
The most prominent Israeli military counter-terrorism operations (military campaigns and military operations) carried out against Palestinian militants during 1974 include:

=== United Nations Organization ===
On November 22, 1974, the United Nations General Assembly voted the United Nations General Assembly Resolution 3236 "Recognizing the Palestinian people's right to self-determination, and officializing United Nations contact with the Palestine Liberation Organization and adding the "Question of Palestine" to the U.N. Agenda".

This Resolution "Reaffirms the inalienable rights of the Palestinian people in Palestine, including: (a) The right to self-determination without external interference; (b) The right to national independence and sovereignty; Reaffirms also the inalienable right of the Palestinians to return to their homes and property from which they have been displaced and uprooted, and calls for their return; Emphasizes that full respect for and the realization of these inalienable rights of the Palestinian people are indispensable for the solution of the question of Palestine; Recognizes that the Palestinian people is a principal party in the establishment of a just and lasting peace in the Middle East; Further recognizes the right of the Palestinian people to regain its rights by all means in accordance with the purposes and principles of the Charter of the United Nations;"

=== Unknown dates ===
- The founding of the kibbutz Kfar Haruv.

== Births ==
- 10 February – Ivri Lider, Israeli singer.
- 8 March – Anat Elimelech, Israeli actress and model (died 1997).
- 12 March – Walid Badir, Arab Israeli footballer.
- 1 May – Maor Cohen, Israeli singer and entertainer.
- 16 June – Adir Miller, Israeli actor and comedian.
- 10 October – Oded Katash, Israeli basketball player.
- 10 October – Asi Cohen, Israeli actor and comedian.
- 13 October – Reuven Rubin, Romanian-born Israeli painter and Israel's first ambassador to Romania.
- Full date unknown
  - Maya Attoun – multi-disciplinary visual artist, and art teacher (died 2022)

== Deaths ==
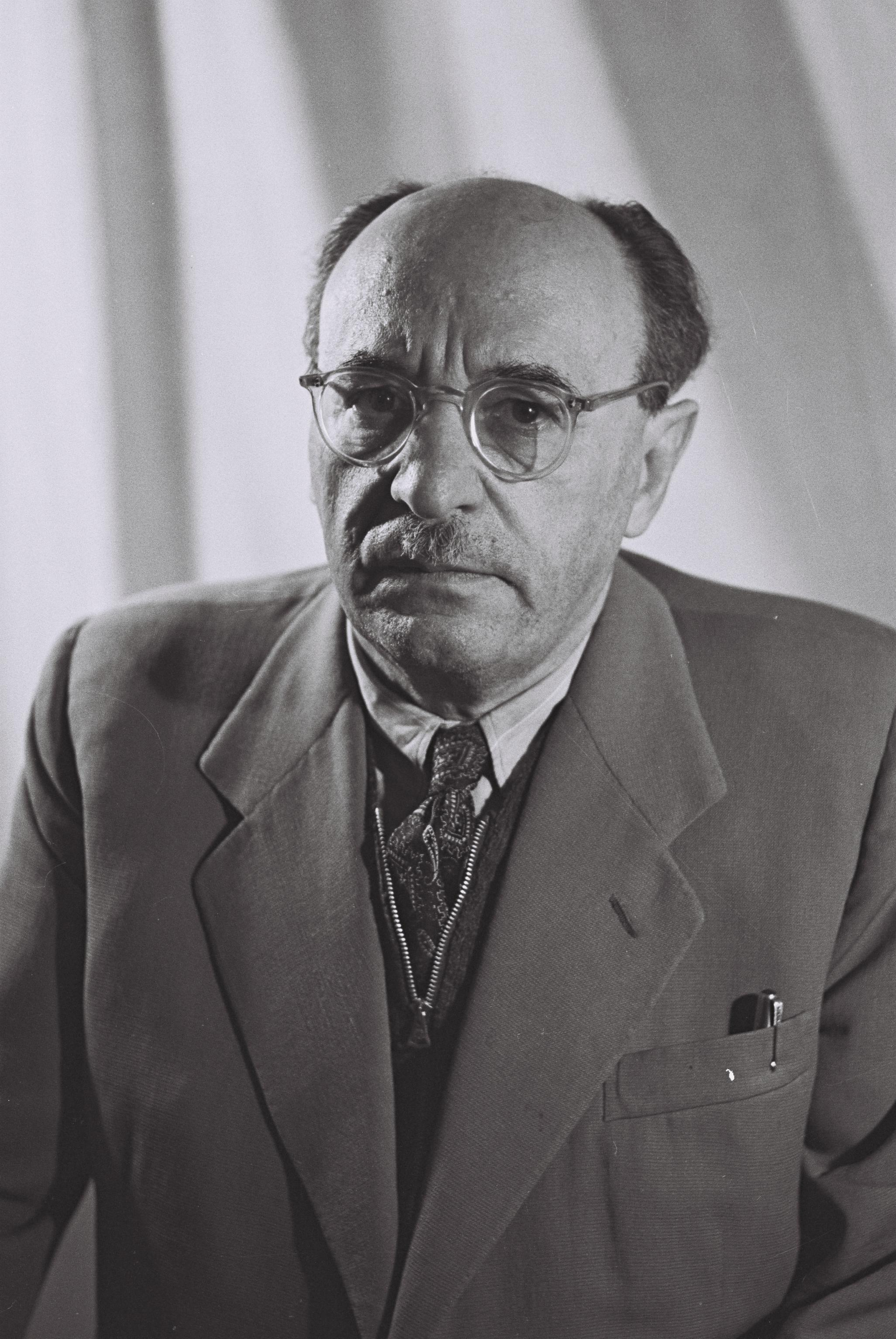
Zalman Shazar

- 15 January – Yosef Serlin (born 1906), Russian (Poland)-born Zionist activist, lawyer and Israeli politician
- 5 April – Yitzhak Arieli (born 1896), leading Israeli rabbi
- 5 October – Zalman Shazar (born 1889), Russian (Belarus)-born Israeli politician, author and poet. He served as the third President of Israel.
- 13 October – Reuven Rubin (born 1893), Romanian-born Israeli painter and diplomat
- 6 November – Shlomo Zemach (born 1887), Russian (Poland)-born Israeli author, agriculturalist and early Zionist pioneer
- Full date unknown
  - Meir Margalit (born 1906), Russian (Poland)-born Israeli stage actor
  - Aharon Meskin (born 1898), Russian (Belarus)-born Israeli stage actor
  - Moshe Halevy (born 1895), Russian (Belarus)-born Israeli theater director and found of the Ohel Theater.

== See also ==
- 1974 in Israeli film
- 1974 in Israeli television
- 1974 in Israeli music
- 1974 in Israeli sport
- Israel in the Eurovision Song Contest 1974
