= October 22 Scud missile attack =

Part of the 1973 Arab–Israeli War

- Part of the Yom Kippur War
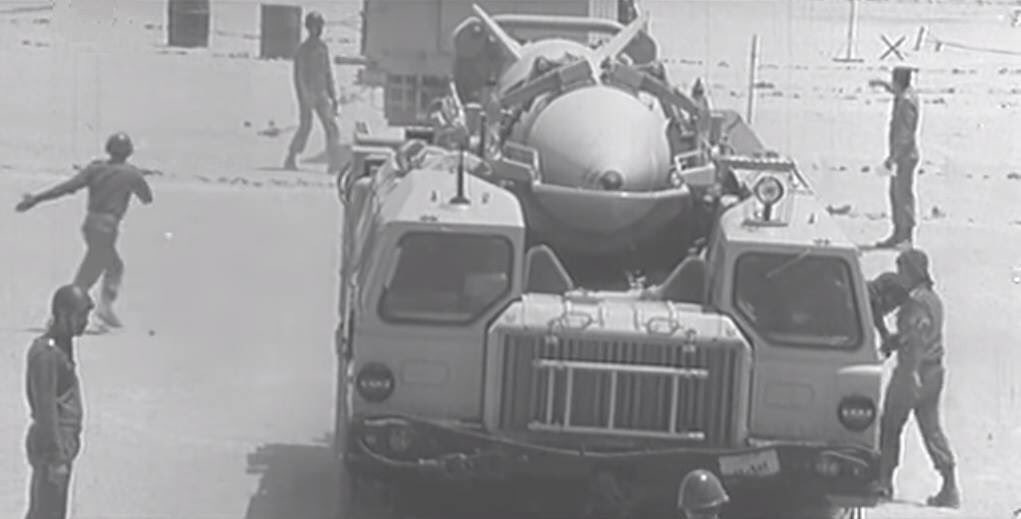
- Egyptian personnel setting up a Scud missile
- Type: Ballistic missile attack
- Location: Israeli Army bridgehead at Deversoir, Egypt; 30°25′22″N 032°20′07″E
- Objective: (Israel) Israeli Army troops
- Date: 22 October 1973
- Executed by: (Egypt) Egyptian Army
- Outcome: Missile landed in Israel
- Casualties: 7 Israeli soldiers killed

Egypt launched three Scud missiles against Israel on 22 October 1973, in the midst of the Yom Kippur War. One of the missiles was fired at Arish and the others at the Israeli bridgehead on the western bank of the Suez Canal, near Deversoir. This was the world's first operational use of Scud missiles.

== Background ==
One of the lessons learned by Egypt following the Six-Day War was the need of a weapon able to hit deep inside Israel. The weapon would have to interrupt any Israeli attack manoeuvres and would serve as a deterrent. As a result of the need, Egypt armed itself with three types of weapons:

- Heavy bombers that could strike deep inside Israel.
- Cruise missiles that would be able to overcome the Israeli missile defence systems.
- Long range surface-to-surface missiles that would be able to strike deep inside Israel and that would be launched from deep inside Egypt, defended by Egypt's air defence networks.

The Soviets feared equipping Egypt with deep-strike abilities, which caused tensions between Egypt and the Soviet Union. Eventually, the Soviets agreed to supply Egypt with KSR-2 Air-to-Surface missiles, Tupolev Tu-16s (instead of the newer Tupolev Tu-22 Egypt requested) and a division of Scud surface-to-surface missiles. The Mossad was aware of the Scud delivery since June 1973, before the missiles had arrived in Egypt on August 24. The Soviets also trained Egyptian soldiers to operate the systems.

The Scud division included 10 launchers, and Israel Military Intelligence (Aman) estimated that the manpower training would take at least 11–12 months, meaning that Egypt would only be able to use the missiles in the first quarter of 1974 at the earliest. However, it is possible that the Egyptians were operating Scud missiles on their own by October 1973. In addition, Aman learned that the Scud division would be on active duty from the beginning of October 1973. The Agranat Commission later referred to the Scud missiles and saw them as a factor that could have changed the balance of power on the battlefield.

Aman estimated that Egypt would not dare to go to war against Israel without first equipping itself with Scud missiles, which could act as an opposing threat to the IAF's abilities (Aman was still convinced Egypt would not be able to operate the Scud missiles before the beginning of 1974).

== The attack ==
Israeli intelligence received information which stated that between October 12 and October 13 Soviet teams conducted reconnaissance in the area of Port Said, Ismailia and Damietta, searching for launching sites for the Scud missiles. The intelligence estimate was that the Scud missiles could hit deep inside Israel, as far as Netanya, and from some launching areas, the Scuds might even be able to hit Haifa. As a response to the intelligence estimates, Israel launched aircraft sorties in the region and asked the Israeli ambassador to the United States, Simcha Dinitz, to inform the U.S. Secretary of State, Henry Kissinger, about the Soviet missions, so he would discuss the subject with his Soviet counterpart.

On the night between October 14 and October 15, the IDF crossed to the western side of the Suez Canal and started forming a bridgehead as preparation to a deep assault inside Egypt. The following day, Egyptian president Anwar Sadat threatened that he would retaliate with surface-to-surface missiles as a response to attacks deep inside Egypt. As a result, the Israeli defense minister Moshe Dayan decided not to attack economical targets in Egypt the following day, in a direct contradiction to his opinion on the subject in the previous days.

On October 20, Moshe Dayan and the Israeli Chief of Staff David Elazar considered conquering Port Said and Port Fuad. During the discussion, the question of Scud launches as an Egyptian response was taken into account. In addition, Israel also bombed the Egyptian missile batteries at Port Said several times. The Egyptians claim that Israel attacked there because of its fear of Scud missiles being positioned there, due to the fact that Scud missiles positioned at Port Said could threaten all of Israel's big cities.

On October 21, out of desperation, the Egyptians moved a battery of Scud missiles that was previously deployed in the eastern area of the Nile's delta (from where Tel Aviv was in the battery's range), to an eastern position in a minimum distance from the canal.

On October 22, the UN Security Council accepted resolution 338. The resolution demanded that a ceasefire be in effect at 19:00.

According to Victor Aisralian, a high-ranking officer in the Soviet Foreign Ministry, the Scud division was under Soviet control, and fully staffed by Soviet personnel. The Egyptian leadership and the Soviet advisers were disappointed that the war was about to end without them having used the most sophisticated weapon the Soviets had supplied Egypt. As a result, in the hours before the ceasefire took into effect, the Soviet ambassador to Egypt called the Soviet foreign minister and asked for his permission to launch missile strikes against Israel. Unable to reach him, he turned to the Soviet minister of defence, who approved the attack. In the last few minutes before the ceasefire took into effect, the Soviet teams managed to fire three missiles, without Egyptian knowledge or approval. Each of the three Scud missiles carried 2 tons of explosives. One of the missiles exploded near Arish, from which Israel received its aid from the United States. The other two were fired at the Israeli bridgehead at Deversoir, one hitting on the western side of the Suez Canal, the other striking on the eastern side, killing seven soldiers from the 410th battalion of the 600th armored brigade. The explosion left a crater of 15 meter in diameter and a depth of four meters. Later on, Sadat claimed in his book that he commanded the forces to fire the Scuds at the Israeli bridgehead: "I wanted Israel to know that we have such weapons and that we would be able to use them later on in the war". Some additional memories were published in Russian in the Vremya Novostei newspaper at the 30th anniversary of the launch of October 22, 1973.

== Aftermath ==
As a result of the knowledge about the Egyptian Scuds able to hit deep inside Israel and take almost all of Sinai from El Arish to the very South of Sinai, Israel avoided attacking strategic targets deep inside Egypt throughout the entire war. This fear was raised by military intelligence chief Eli Zeira at a situation assessment with the Chief of Staff on October 9. This avoidance is more noticeable when compared to the significant Israeli strikes which were conducted during the 1967-70 War of Attrition. These strikes caused significant damage to the Egyptian military and forced it to defend the Egyptian front, therefore weakening its offensive capabilities. On the Syrian front, however, Israel struck deep inside Syria, damaging the Syrian war effort and even disrupting normal life in the country, attacking important power plants, petrol supplies, bridges and main roads.
