= 1973 in Israel =

- Decades: 1950s; 1960s; 1970s; 1980s; 1990s
- See also: History of Israel; Timeline of Israeli history; List of years in Israel

Events in the year 1973 in Israel.

== Incumbents ==
- President of Israel – Zalman Shazar until 24 May, Ephraim Katzir
- Prime Minister of Israel – Golda Meir (Alignment)
- President of the Supreme Court – Shimon Agranat
- Chief of General Staff – David Elazar
- Government of Israel – 15th Government of Israel

== Events ==
- 21 February – Libyan Arab Airlines Flight 114 (Boeing 727) is shot down by Israeli fighter aircraft over the Sinai Desert, after the passenger plane is suspected of being an enemy military plane. Only five (one crew member and four passengers) of the 113 on board survive.
- 7 April – Ilanit represents Israel at the Eurovision Song Contest in Luxembourg City with the song “Ey Sham” (Somewhere), as the country's debut entry in the contest, achieving fourth place.
- 10 April – The Israeli Knesset elects Ephraim Katzir as President of Israel, by a majority of 66 to 41 votes cast in favour of his opponent, Ephraim Urbach.
- 24 May – Ephraim Katzir assumes office as the fourth president of the State of Israel.
- July – The 1973 Maccabiah Games are held.
- 21 July – Lillehammer affair: Israeli Mossad agents assassinate a Moroccan waiter in Lillehammer. He had been mistaken for Ali Hassan Salameh, one of the leaders of Black September, the Palestinian group responsible for the 1972's Munich Olympics Massacre, who had been given shelter in Norway. Six Mossad agents were arrested by the Norwegian authorities and the incident became known as the "Lillehammer affair".
- 13 September – A full-scale aerial battle over the Mediterranean Sea between the Israeli Air Force and the Syrian Air Force. Israeli Air Force jets down 13 Syrian MiG-21s in a dogfight. One Israeli plane was downed but the pilot was rescued.
- October – The Likud party is founded by Menachem Begin in an alliance with several right-wing and liberal parties.

Yom Kippur War:

- 6 October – Yom Kippur War: The fourth and largest Arab–Israeli conflict begins, as Egypt and Syria initiate a surprise attack on Israeli forces in the Sinai Peninsula and Golan Heights on Yom Kippur, the holiest day of the Hebrew calendar. Jordan, Iraq and other Arab nations support the Epyptian-Syrian war effort but do not take part in the conflict.
- 8 October –
  - Gabi Amir's armored brigade attacks Egyptian occupied positions on the Israeli side of the Suez Canal, in hope of driving them away. The attack fails, and over 150 Israeli tanks are destroyed.
  - The 188t brigade (Barak brigade), which played an important role in slowing the Syrian advance, is outnumbered and overwhelmed and, as a result, is almost completely destroyed as the Southern Golan Heights region is captured by the Syrian forces.
- 12 October – US President Richard Nixon authorizes Operation Nickel Grass, an overt strategic airlift to deliver weapons and supplies to Israel, after the Soviet Union began sending arms to Egypt and Syria.
- 17 October – The Arab Oil Embargo against several countries which allegedly support Israel triggers the 1973 energy crisis.
- 21–22 October – Third Battle of Mount Hermon: towards the end of the war, Israeli troops manage to capture the Israeli outpost and the Syrian outpost on Mount Hermon.
- 11 November – Egypt and Israel sign a United States-sponsored cease-fire accord.

Post-war:

- 31 December – the Alignment party headed by Golda Meir wins the eighth Israeli legislative elections.
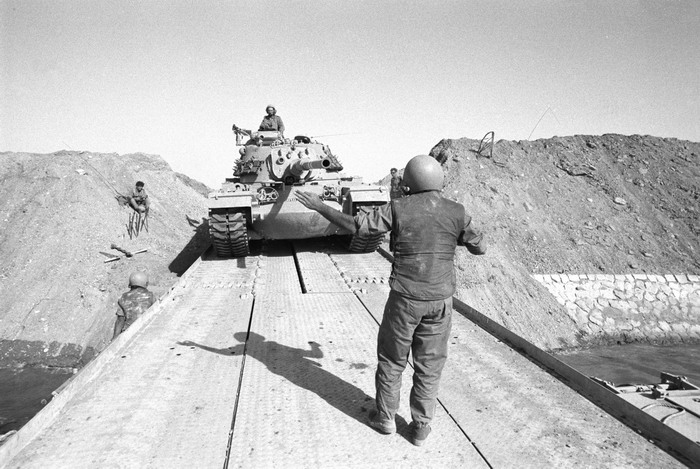
Israeli tanks crossing the Suez Canal

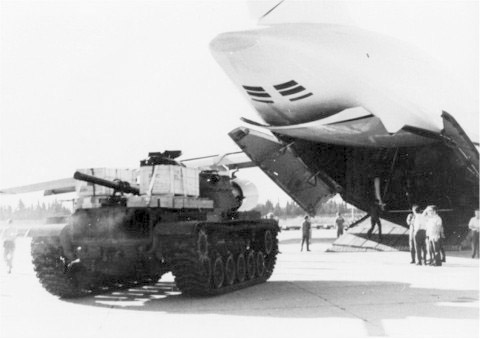
M60 tank unloaded from a USAF C-5 Galaxy during Operation Nickel Grass

=== Israeli–Palestinian conflict ===
The most prominent events related to the Israeli–Palestinian conflict which occurred during 1973 include:

Notable Palestinian militant operations against Israeli targets

The most prominent Palestinian Arab terror attacks committed against Israelis during 1973 include:

- 1 July – Col. Yosef Alon, air force attaché in the Israeli Embassy in Washington, was assassinated outside his home in Chevy Chase, Maryland. Declassified CIA documents, Alon's voluminous FBI case file, and interviews revealed in 2007 that a Palestinian source stated the murder was carried out by the Black September organization.
- 19 September – Ami Shachori, an agriculture counselor at the Israeli embassy in England, was assassinated by Black September militants.
- 17 December – Five Palestinian terrorists shoot at passengers waiting in an El Al Israel Airlines lounge at a Rome airport, killing two civilians. Then they hurled incendiary grenades at a Pan-Am Boeing 707 awaiting to take off, killing 29 passengers.

Notable Israeli military operations against Palestinian militancy targets

The most prominent Israeli military counter-terrorism operations (military campaigns and military operations) carried out against Palestinian militants during 1973 include:

- 9–10 April – Operation Spring of Youth: IDF special forces units attacks several Palestine Liberation Organization (PLO) targets in Beirut and Sidon, Lebanon, During the operation, three of the highest-level PLO leaders, surprised at home, were killed, along with other PLO militants. Several Lebanese security people and civilian neighbors were also killed. Two Israeli soldiers were killed during the operation.

=== Unknown dates ===
- The founding of the kibbutz Ketura.

== Notable births ==
- 8 February – Eviatar Banai, Israeli singer.
- 10 May – Aviv Geffen, Israeli singer.
- 18 August - Carmel Shama, Israeli politician
- 11 December – Tal Berman, Israeli TV host and Radio broadcaster.

== Notable deaths ==
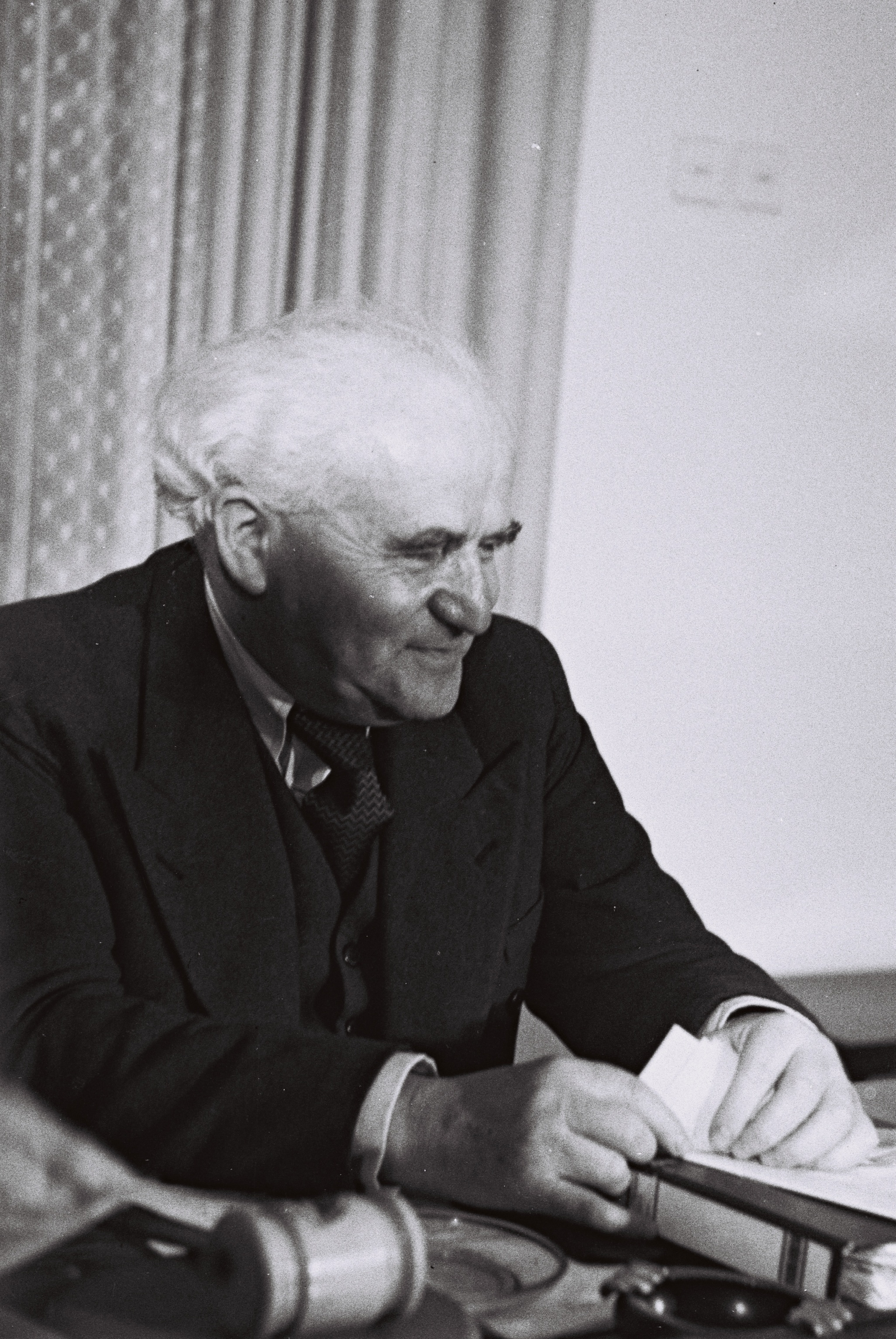
David Ben-Gurion

- 22 January – Yaakov Dori (born 1899), Russian (Ukraine)-born first Chief of Staff of the Israel Defense Forces.
- 15 March – Mark Dvorzhetski (born 1908), Russian (Lithuania)-born Israeli physician and historian.
- 24 March – Haim Hazaz (born 1898), Russian (Ukraine)-born Israeli novelist.
- 18 May – Avraham Shlonsky (born 1900), Russian (Ukraine)-born Israeli poet and editor.
- 1 July – Yosef Alon (born 1929), Israeli pilot, co-founder of the Israeli Air Force, assassinated.
- 8 July – Ben-Zion Dinur (born 1884), Russian (Ukraine)-born Israeli educator, historian and politician.
- 13 October – Major General Albert Mandler (born 1929), Austrian-born Israeli major general, killed by Egyptian artillery fire during the Yom Kippur War.
- October - Lieutenant Colonel Avraham Lanir (born 1940), the highest ranking Israeli fighter pilot to fall into enemy hands. He was tortured to death by his Syrian captors.
- 17 October – Naftali Herz Tur-Sinai (born 1886), Austro-Hungarian (Galicia)-born Israeli biblical scholar, author and linguist.
- 1 December – David Ben-Gurion (born 1886), Russian (Poland)-born Israeli politician and first Prime Minister of Israel.

== See also ==
- 1973 in Israeli film
- 1973 in Israeli television
- 1973 in Israeli music
- 1973 in Israeli sport
- Israel in the Eurovision Song Contest 1973
