= 1975 in Israel =

- Decades: 1950s; 1960s; 1970s; 1980s; 1990s
- See also: History of Israel; Timeline of Israeli history; List of years in Israel

Events in the year 1975 in Israel.

== Incumbents ==
- President of Israel – Ephraim Katzir
- Prime Minister of Israel – Yitzhak Rabin (Alignment)
- President of the Supreme Court – Shimon Agranat
- Chief of General Staff – Mordechai Gur
- Government of Israel – 17th Government of Israel

== Events ==
- 8 January – Yehoshua Ben-Zion convicted of embezzling £20 million from the Israeli-British Bank which collapsed in July 1974 owing British investors £46.6 million. He was sentenced to 12 years in prison. Later, Ben-Zion was pardoned by the Israeli president after intervention of Menachem Begin and was released after serving 3 years.
- 22 March – Shlomo Artzi represents Israel at the Eurovision Song Contest with the song “At Va'Ani” ("You and Me").
- 25 April – Leading Israeli pop star Mike Brant, who achieved world fame after moving to France, leaps to his death from a six store apartment in Paris.
- 4 September – The Sinai Interim Agreement is signed between Israel and Egypt in Geneva.
- 10 November – United Nations General Assembly Resolution 3379 is adopted by a vote of 72 to 35 (with 32 abstentions) which equate Zionism with racism. The resolution was eventually revoked by Resolution 46/86 on 16 December 1991. In the history of the UN, this is the only resolution that has ever been revoked.
- 25 November – Israeli Air Force C-130H 203/4X-FBO, c/n 4533, crashes into mount Jebel Halal, 55 kilometers south-southeast of El Arish, in the Israeli-administered Sinai Peninsula. Pilots were Shaul Bustan and Uri Manor.

=== Israeli–Palestinian conflict ===
The most prominent events related to the Israeli–Palestinian conflict which occurred during 1975 include:

Notable Palestinian militant operations against Israeli targets

The most prominent Palestinian Arab terror attacks committed against Israeli targets during 1975 include:

- 6 March – Savoy Hotel Attack: eight Al-Fatah commandos seize the Savoy Hotel in Tel Aviv after they rowed ashore to Israel from the Mediterranean Sea. 13 civilians were taken hostage. The Israeli counter-terrorism unit Sayeret Matkal stormed the hotel later in the day, killing seven of the eight militants. Five of the hostages were freed while eight hostages and three of the Israeli soldiers died in the operation.
- 3 May – The Israeli capital of Jerusalem was struck by missiles for the first time, after two Czechoslovak-made Katyusha rockets, fired by Arab guerillas, struck 500 meters from the Knesset parliament building.
- 15 June – Kfar Yuval hostage crisis: a terror cell consisting of Palestinian Arab assailants from the Arab Liberation Front cross the border from Lebanon and manage to infiltrate moshav Kfar Yuval in the night and enter one of the houses of the moshav. They kill one of the family members who tries to fight them and then hold the rest of the family members as hostages, demanding the release of Palestinian assailants held in Israeli prisons. A raid by an IDF infantry unit kills all four assailants. Two hostages and one soldier are also killed during the raid.
- 4 July – Zion Square refrigerator bombing: A refrigerator that had five kilograms of explosives packed into its sides explodes on Zion Square, a main square leading to Ben Yehuda Street and Jaffa Road, Jerusalem. Fifteen people are killed and 77 injured in the attack. The PLO claims responsibility for the attack.

Notable Israeli military operations against Palestinian militancy targets

The most prominent Israeli military counter-terrorism operations (military campaigns and military operations) carried out against Palestinian militants during 1975 include:

=== Unknown dates ===
- The founding of the West Bank settlement of Ma'ale Adummim.

== Notable births ==
- 2 March – Muki, Israeli singer and rapper.
- 7 March – Michal Amdursky, Israeli dancer and singer
- 12 March – Tzachi Halevy, Israeli actor and singer
- 23 March – Adi Ashkenazi, Israeli actress and comedian.
- 3 April – Nachshon Wachsman, kidnapped IDF soldier, killed during an attempted rescue operation (died 1994).
- 22 May – Noa Tishby, Israeli actress and activist.
- 17 June – Eli Finish, Israeli actor and comedian
- 8 July – Skazi, Israeli psytrance DJ and a producer
- 28 July – Ori Pfeffer, Israeli actor
- 30 August – Amir Benayoun, Israeli singer-songwriter
- 16 September – Gal Fridman, Israeli windsurfer and Olympic gold medalist.
- 12 November – Nina Brosh, Israeli model and actress

== Notable deaths ==
- 22 February – Mordechai Namir (born 1897), Russian (Ukraine)-born Israeli politician.
- 6 April – Ernst David Bergmann (born 1903), German-born Israeli nuclear scientist and chemist.
- 25 April – Mike Brant (born 1947), Israeli singer, committed suicide.
- 18 June – Hugo Bergmann (born 1883), Austro-Hungarian (Bohemia)-born German and Israeli Jewish philosopher.
- 11 August – Rachel Katznelson-Shazar (born 1885), Russian (Belarus)-born Zionist political figure and wife of third President of Israel.
- 12 August – Pinchas Sapir (born 1906), Russian (Poland)-born Israeli politician.
- 25 September – Yehoshua Bar-Hillel (born 1915), Austrian-born Israeli philosopher, mathematician, and linguist.
- Full date unknown
  - Israel Reichart (born 1891), Russian (Poland)-born Israeli agriculturist and biologist.
  - Moshe Zilberg (born 1900), Russian (Lithuania)-born leading Israeli jurist.

== See also ==
- 1975 in Israeli film
- 1975 in Israeli television
- 1975 in Israeli music
- 1975 in Israeli sport
- Israel in the Eurovision Song Contest 1975
