= 1976 in Israel =

- Decades: 1950s; 1960s; 1970s; 1980s; 1990s
- See also: History of Israel; Timeline of Israeli history; List of years in Israel

Events in the year 1976 in Israel.

== Incumbents ==
- President of Israel – Ephraim Katzir
- Prime Minister of Israel – Yitzhak Rabin (Alignment)
- President of the Supreme Court – Shimon Agranat; Yoel Zussman
- Chief of General Staff – Mordechai Gur
- Government of Israel – 17th Government of Israel

== Events ==
- 3 April – Shokolad, Menta, Mastik represents Israel at the Eurovision Song Contest with the song “Emor Shalom” ("Say Hello"), achieving sixth place.
- 11 July – Miss Israel, Rina Mor, wins the title of Miss Universe 1976 becoming the first Israeli to win one of the most publicized international beauty contest.
- 10 December – The first F-15 fighter aircraft arrive in Israel. The fact that they landed in Israel on a Friday evening, after the start of Sabbath, causes a political crisis and prompts the religious parties in the Knesset to topple the first Rabin government.
- 21 December – Prime Minister Yitzhak Rabin submits his resignation to the president after a coalition crisis with the religious parties triggered by the arrival of the first F-15 aircraft in Israel after the start of the Sabbath.

=== Israeli–Palestinian conflict ===
The most prominent events related to the Israeli–Palestinian conflict which occurred during 1976 include:

- 30 March – Land Day: Arab citizens of Israel hold strikes and protests against government land expropriation plans in the Galilee. Six Arab Israelis are killed in clashes with security forces. The events later become commemorated annually as Land Day.

Notable Israeli military operations against Palestinian militancy targets

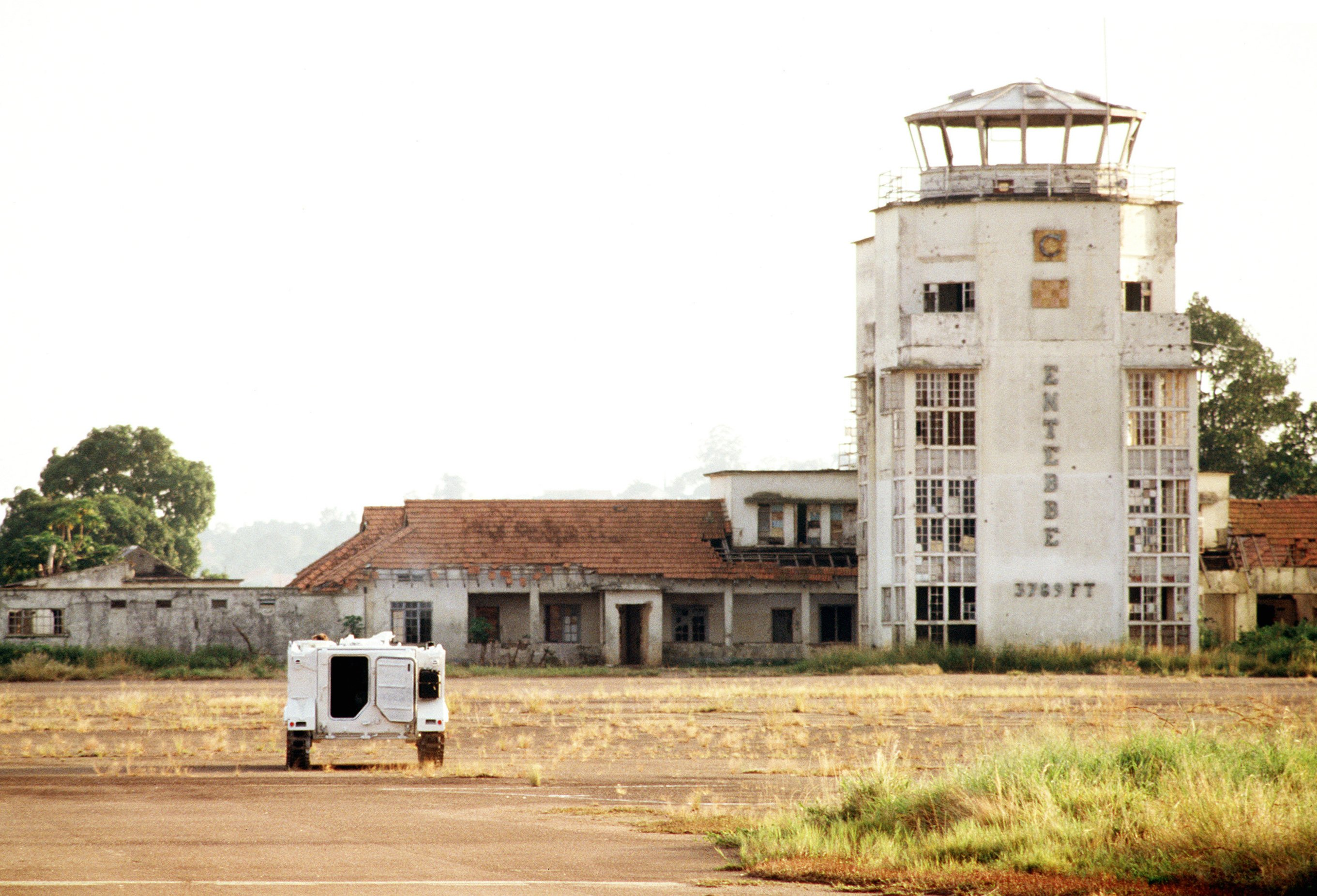
The old airport control tower of Entebbe

The most prominent Israeli military counter-terrorism operations (military campaigns and military operations) carried out against Palestinian militants during 1976 include:

- 4 July – Operation Entebbe: Israeli airborne commandos free 103 hostages being held by Palestinian Arab and German hijackers of an Air France plane at Uganda's Entebbe Airport; one Israeli soldier and several Ugandan soldiers are killed in the raid.
- 22 October – An Israeli naval commando raids a harbor in Tyre and sinks a terrorist ship.

Notable Palestinian militant operations against Israeli targets

The most prominent Palestinian Arab terror attacks committed against Israelis during 1976 include:

- 27 June – Air France Flight 139, originating in Tel Aviv and carrying 248 passengers and a crew of 12 takes off from Athens, Greece, headed for Paris, France. The flight is hijacked by Palestinian Arab assailants with German Revolutionäre Zellen supporters and flown to Entebbe Airport (now known as Entebbe International Airport) in Uganda. Shortly after landing, all non-Jewish passengers were released. The hijacking of this flight leads to the IDF hostage-rescue mission "Operation Entebbe" carried out in the Entebbe Airport seven days later (see details above).

=== Unknown dates ===
- The founding of the kibbutz Samar.

== Notable births ==
- 5 April – Sendi Bar, Israeli actress and model.
- 25 April – Amir Fay Guttman, Israeli singer and actor.
- 18 September – Guri Alfi, Israeli actor and stand-up comedian.

== Notable deaths ==
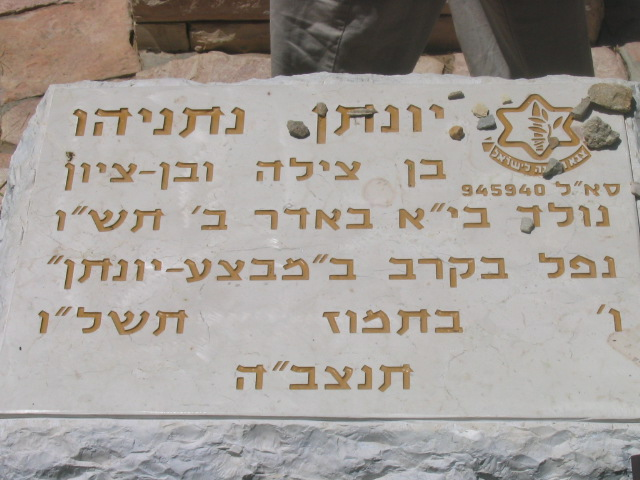
Yonatan Netanyahu's gravestone

- 24 January – Pinhas Lavon (born 1910), Austro-Hungarian (Galicia)-born Israeli politician, minister and labor leader, best known for the Lavon Affair.
- 15 April – David Elazar (born 1925), Yugoslav (Bosnia)-born Israeli military officer, the ninth Chief of Staff of the Israel Defense Forces.
- 25 April – Markus Reiner (born 1886), Austro-Hungarian (Bukovina)-born Israeli scientist.
- 4 July – Yonatan Netanyahu (born 1946), U.S.-born commander of the elite Israeli army commando unit Sayeret Matkal, killed during Operation Entebbe.
- 19 September – Yehezkel Abramsky (born 1886), Russian (Belarus)-born eminent Israeli Orthodox rabbi.

== See also ==
- 1976 in Israeli film
- Israel in the Eurovision Song Contest 1976
- Israel at the 1976 Summer Olympics
