= 1978 in Israel =

- Decades: 1950s; 1960s; 1970s; 1980s; 1990s
- See also: History of Israel; Timeline of Israeli history; List of years in Israel

Events in the year 1978 in Israel.

== Incumbents ==
- President of Israel – Ephraim Katzir until 29 May, Yitzhak Navon
- Prime Minister of Israel – Menachem Begin (Likud)
- President of the Supreme Court – Yoel Zussman
- Chief of General Staff – Mordechai Gur until 16 April, Rafael Eitan
- Government of Israel – 18th Government of Israel

== Events ==
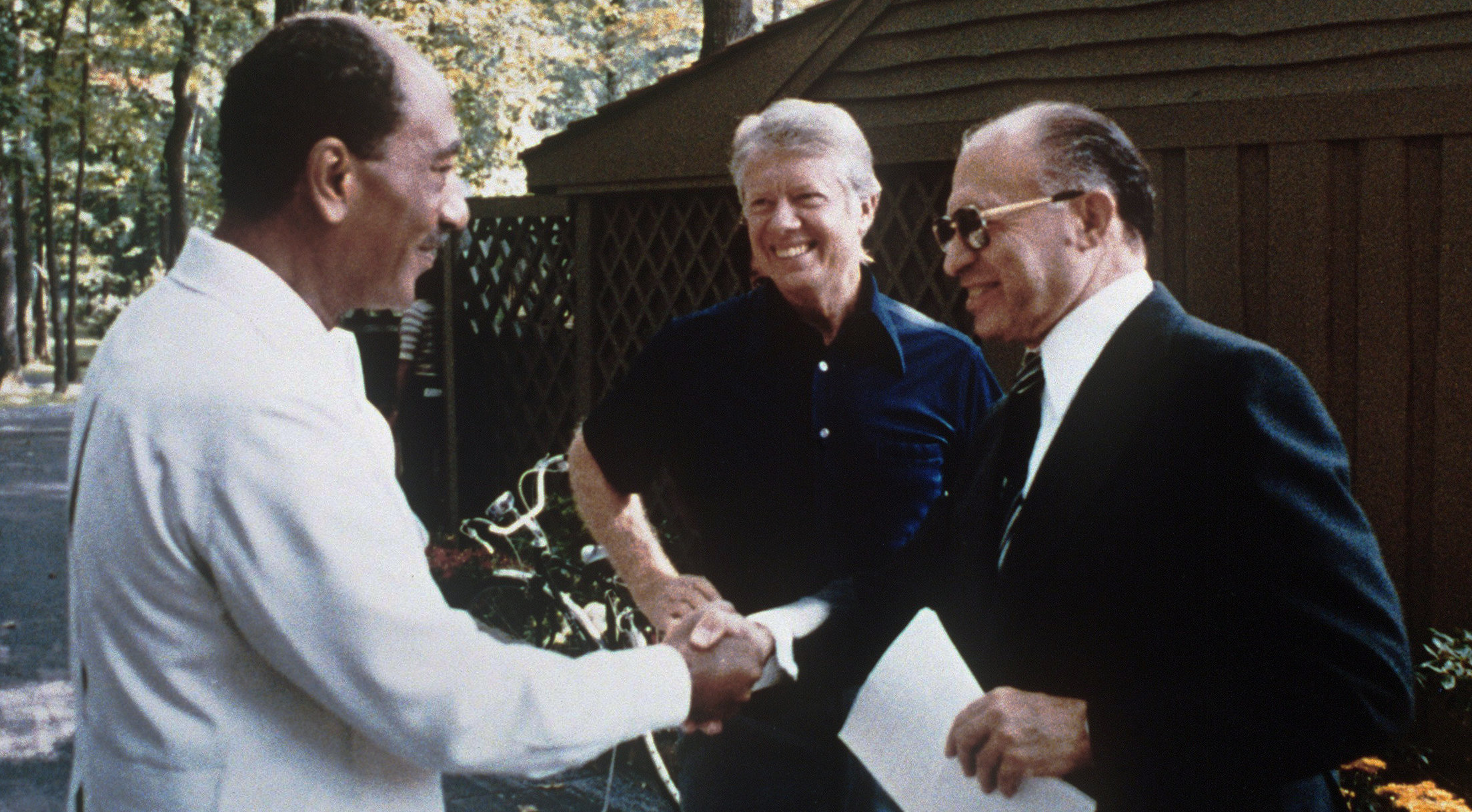
Israeli prime minister Menachem Begin and Egyptian president Anwar Sadat with U.S. president Jimmy Carter at Camp David in 1978

- 16 April – Rafael Eitan is appointed as the 11th Chief of Staff of the Israel Defense Forces.
- 19 April – The Israeli Knesset elects Yitzhak Navon as President of Israel by a vote of 86 in favour, with 23 members casting blank votes. There was no other candidate.
- 22 April – Izhar Cohen and the Alphabeta win the Eurovision Song Contest for Israel with the song "A-Ba-Ni-Bi".
- 29 May – Yitzhak Navon assumes office as the 5th president of the State of Israel.
- 17 September – The Camp David Accords are signed between Israel and Egypt. The Accords lead directly to the 1979 Israel-Egypt Peace Treaty.
- 27 October – Egyptian President Anwar Sadat and Israeli Prime Minister Menachem Begin win the Nobel Peace Prize for their progress toward achieving a Middle East accord.
- 10 December – Prime Minister of Israel Menachem Begin and President of Egypt Anwar Sadat are jointly awarded the Nobel Peace Prize.

=== Israeli–Palestinian conflict ===
The most prominent events related to the Israeli–Palestinian conflict which occurred during 1978 include:

Notable Palestinian militant operations against Israeli targets

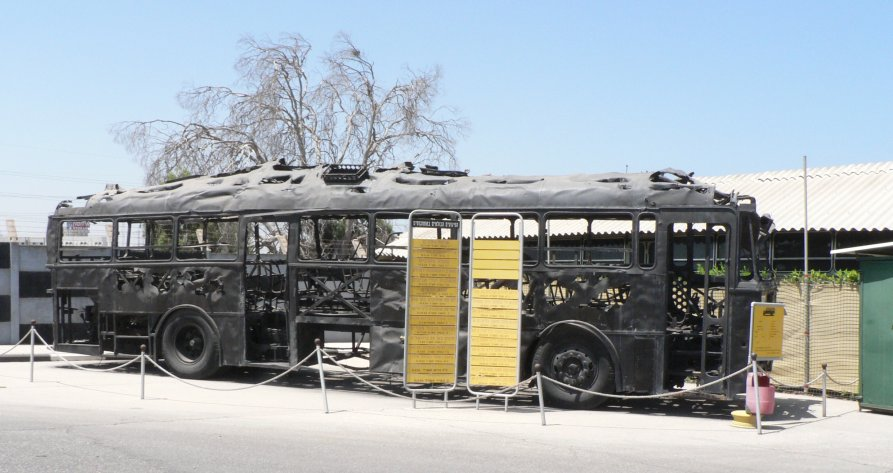
Coastal Road massacre – The charred remains of the hijacked Egged coach, at the Egged museum in Holon.

The most prominent Palestinian Arab terror attacks committed against Israelis during 1978 include:

- 11 March – Coastal Road Massacre: 11 Fatah members led by the 18-year-old female Dalal Mughrabi traveled from Lebanon to Israel, killed several tourists and hijack a bus on the coastal road near Haifa. After a lengthy chase and shootout, 37 Israelis were killed and 76 wounded.

Notable Israeli military operations against Palestinian militancy targets

The most prominent Israeli military counter-terrorism operations (military campaigns and military operations) carried out against Palestinian militants during 1978 include:

- 14 March – 1978 South Lebanon conflict: a large-scale invasion of IDF forces to South Lebanon aimed at expelling the PLO forces from the territory. The operation was successful for the Israeli Defense Forces, as PLO forces were eventually pushed north of the Litani river.

=== Unknown dates ===
- The founding of the moshav Aniam.
- The founding of the West Bank city Ariel.
- The founding of the moshav Avnei Eitan.
- The founding of the kibbutz Ortal.
- The founding of the community settlement Sapir.

== Notable births ==
- 17 April – Ido Mosseri, Israeli actor
- 3 May – Miri Mesika, singer and actress
- 20 August – Assaf Granit, chef and restaurant owner
- 20 September – Sarit Hadad, Israeli singer.

== Notable deaths ==
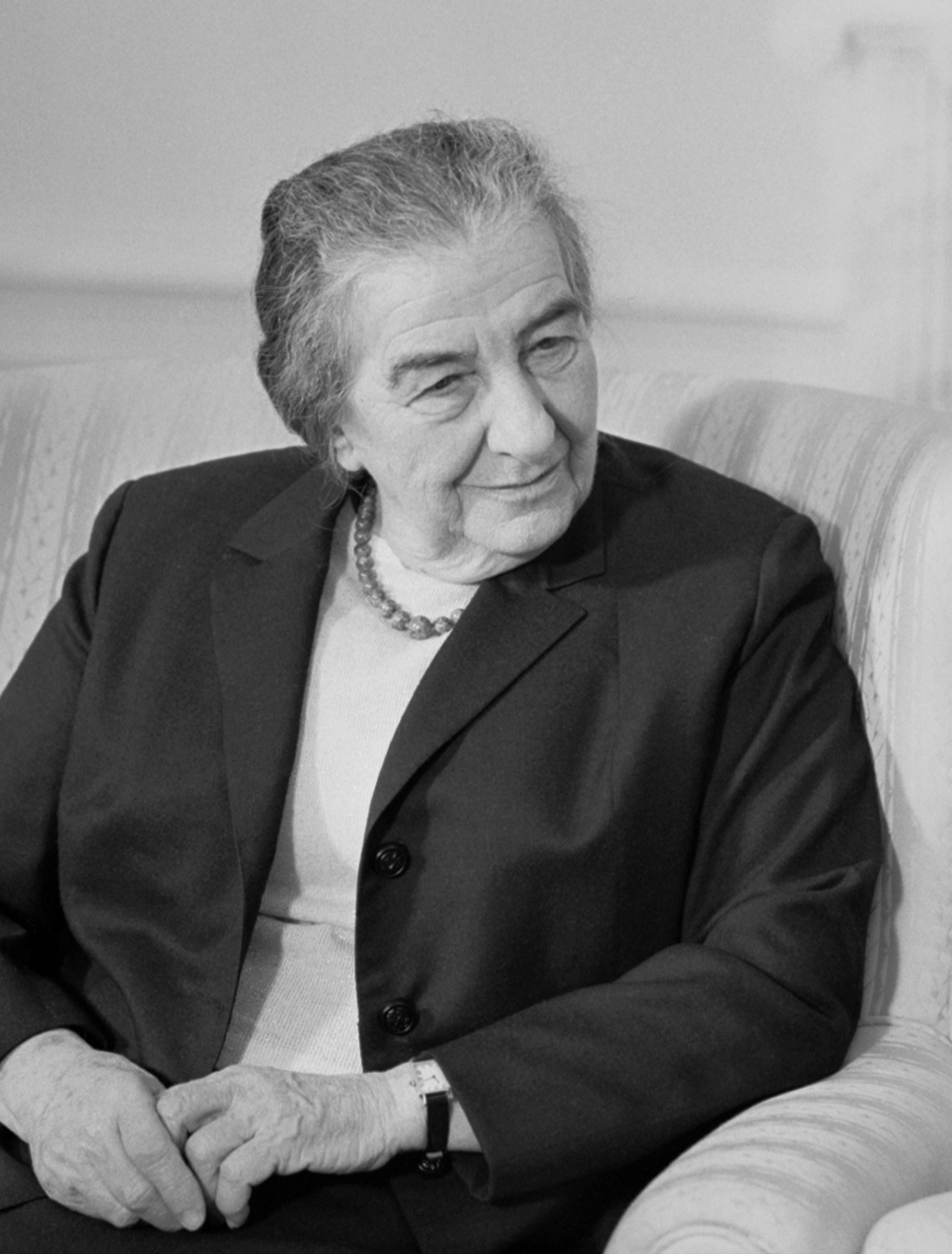
Golda Meir

- 1 February – Yizhar Harari (born 1908), a Zionist activist and Israeli politician.
- 28 February – Rabbi Shlomo Yosef Zevin (born 1888) Russian (Belarus)-born Orthodox rabbi, founded the Encyclopedia Talmudit.
- 23 March – Haim Ernst Wertheimer (born 1893), German-born Israeli biochemist.
- 8 October – Eliyahu Sasson (born 1902), Syrian-born Israeli politician and minister.
- 8 December – Golda Meir (born 1898), Russian (Ukraine)-born and American-raised Israeli politician. Fourth Prime Minister of Israel.

== See also ==
- 1978 in Israeli film
- Israel in the Eurovision Song Contest 1978
