= 1977 in Israel =

- Decades: 1950s; 1960s; 1970s; 1980s; 1990s
- See also: History of Israel; Timeline of Israeli history; List of years in Israel

Events from the year 1977 in Israel.

== Incumbents ==
- President of Israel – Ephraim Katzir
- Prime Minister of Israel – Yitzhak Rabin (Alignment) until 21 June, Menachem Begin (Likud)
- President of the Supreme Court – Yoel Zussman
- Chief of General Staff – Mordechai Gur
- Government of Israel – 17th Government of Israel until 21 June, 18th Government of Israel

== Events ==
- 3 January – The Israeli Minister of Housing Avraham Ofer commits suicide after being suspected of corruption.
- 7 April – Yitzhak Rabin announces his retirement from the premiership of the Labor Party, following the Dollar Account affair.
- 7 April – Maccabi Tel Aviv wins its first European Championship, defeating Mobilgirgi Varese 78:77 in the final held in Pionir Hall, Belgrade and CSKA Moscow 91:79 in semifinal group game held in Virton, Belgium, an achievement that produced Tal Brody's famous sentence "We are on the map, not only in basketball".
- 7 May – Ilanit represents Israel at the Eurovision Song Contest for the second time, with the song “Ahava Hi Shir Lishnayim” ("Love is a Song for Two").
- 10 May – Disaster of the 54: An IAF "Yasur" helicopter crashes in the Jordan Valley. 54 IDF soldiers on board are killed in the disaster.
- 17 May – The Likud Party, led by Menachem Begin, wins the 1977 Israeli legislative election, marking the first time since the establishment of Israel that a right-wing party forms a government.
- 18 May – The election result becomes known as the "Mahapach" (upheaval), signaling a major shift in Israeli politics after nearly three decades of Labor Party Israel Labor rule.
- 20 June – Menachem Begin presents his cabinet for a Knesset "Vote of Confidence". The 18th Government is approved that day and the members are sworn in, ending almost 30 years of rule by the left-wing Alignment and its predecessor, Mapai.
- 21 June – Menachem Begin forms the 18th Government of Israel following a Knesset vote of confidence, officially ending the long period of left-wing political dominance.
- July – The 1977 Maccabiah Games are held.
- Summer – Israel experiences continued economic difficulties, including high inflation, which contribute to public dissatisfaction and political change.
- Autumn – Diplomatic contacts increase between Israel and Egypt following public statements by Anwar Sadat, President of Egypt, expressing willingness to pursue peace negotiations.
- 19 November – Egyptian president Anwar Sadat becomes the first Arab leader to officially visit Israel when he meets with Israeli prime minister Menachem Begin, seeking a permanent peace settlement.
- 20 November – Egyptian president Anwar Sadat gives a speech in the Knesset.
- 25 December – Prime Minister of Israel Menachem Begin meets in Egypt with President of Egypt, Anwar Sadat.
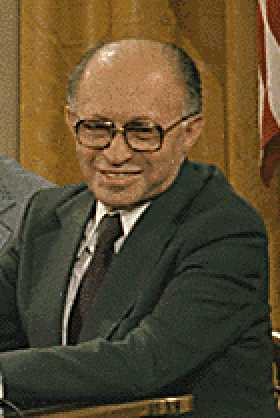
On 17 May 1977 Menachem Begin led the Likud party to victory in the 9th Israeli legislative election

=== Israeli–Palestinian conflict ===
The most prominent events related to the Israeli–Palestinian conflict which occurred during 1977 include:

Notable Palestinian militant operations against Israeli targets

The most prominent Palestinian Arab terror attacks committed against Israelis during 1977 include:

Notable Israeli military operations against Palestinian militancy targets

The most prominent Israeli military counter-terrorism operations (military campaigns and military operations) carried out against Palestinian militants during 1977 include:

=== Unknown dates ===
- The founding of the kibbutz Beit Rimon.

== Births ==
- 12 January – Eithan Urbach, swimmer.
- 16 January – Ariel "Arik" Ze'evi, Judoka.
- 10 February – Dudu Tassa, musician
- 17 March – Rana Raslan, the first Israeli Arab to be crowned Miss Israel.
- 5 April - Jonathan Erlich, tennis player
- 12 July – Yonit Levi, TV news anchorwoman.
- 13 July - Jonah Lotan, actor
- 6 September – Amos Tamam, actor
- 12 September – Idan Raichel, musician
- 19 September – Lior Lubin, basketball player and professional basketball coach (died 2024)
- 12 October – Miri Bohadana, model and actress
- 17 October - Dudu Aouate, footballer
- 9 November – Maya Bouskilla, singer
- 22 November – The Shadow, rapper

== Deaths ==
- 3 January – Avraham Ofer (born 1922), Polish-born Israeli politician.
- 20 February – Baruch Uziel (born 1901), Ottoman (Thessaloniki)-born Israeli politician
- 6 March – Shmuel Stoller (born 1898), Russian-born Israeli agronomist and an early member of the Zionist movement.
- 19 May – Aviad Yafeh (born 1923), diplomat and politician.
- 6 July – Ödön Pártos (born 1907) Hungarian-born Israeli violist and composer.
- 11 July – Yitzhak Danziger (born 1916), German-born Israeli sculptor.
- 13 November – Gertrud Kraus (born 1901), Austrian-born Israeli choreographer and dance pioneer.
- 21 September – Ben-Zion Halfon (born 1930), Libyan-born Israeli politician.

== See also ==
- 1977 in Israeli film
- 1977 in Israeli television
- 1977 in Israeli music
- 1977 in Israeli sport
- Israel in the Eurovision Song Contest 1977
