= List of Israeli films of 1977 =

A list of films produced by the Israeli film industry in 1977.

== 1977 releases ==
Premiere	Title	Director	Cast	Genre	Notes	Ref
?	Operation Thunderbolt (Hebrew: מבצע יונתן, lit. "Operation Jonathan")	Menachem Golan	Yehoram Gaon, Assi Dayan, Klaus Kinski, Sybil Danning	Action, Drama, History		
?	Masa Alunkot (Hebrew: מסע אלונקות, lit. "Journey of the Stretchers")	Yehuda Ne'eman	Gidi Gov, Moni Moshonov and Doval'e Glickman	Drama		
?	Doda Clara (Hebrew: דודה קלרה, lit. "Aunt Clara")	Avraham Heffner	Hanna Meron	Drama		
?	Bo Nefotzetz Million (Hebrew: בוא נפוצץ מיליון, lit. "Let's Blow a Million")	Shmuel Imberman	Yehuda Barkan	Drama		
?	Hershele (Hebrew: הרשל'ה)	Joel Silberg	Mike Burstyn	Musical		
?	Hamesh Ma'ot Elef Shahor (Hebrew: חמש מאות אלף שחור)	Shaike Ophir		Drama		
?	Hatzilu Et HaMatzil (Hebrew: הצילו את המציל, lit. "Save the Lifeguard")	Itzik Kol and Uri Zohar	Uri Zohar and Gabi Amrani	Comedy		
?	Gonev Miganav Patoor (Hebrew: גונב מגנב פטור, lit. "The thief stealing from a thief is exempted")	Ze'ev Revach	Ze'ev Revach	Comedy		

== See also ==
- 1977 in Israel
