= List of Israeli films of 1974 =

A list of films produced by the Israeli film industry in 1974.

== 1974 releases ==
Premiere	Title	Director	Cast	Genre	Notes	Ref
?	Kazablan (Hebrew: קזבלן)	Menahem Golan	Yehoram Gaon	Musical, Bourekas film		
?	Einayim G'dolot (Hebrew: עיניים גדולות, lit. "Big Eyes")	Uri Zohar	Arik Einstein, Uri Zohar	Comedy, Drama		
?	Charlie Ve'hetzi (Hebrew: צ'רלי וחצי, lit. "Charlie and a Half")	Boaz Davidson	Ze'ev Revach, Yehuda Barkan	Bourekas film		
?	Rachel's Man (Hebrew: איש רחל)	Moshé Mizrahi	Michal Bat-Adam	Drama		
?	Sarit (Hebrew: שרית	Shimon Herma and George Obadiah	Yardena Arazi, Yigal Bashan	Drama		
?	Adam (Hebrew: אדם	Yona Day	Ilan Dar and Yehuda Fuchs	Drama		
?	Three and One (Hebrew: שלושה ואחת	Mikhail Kalik	Ori Levy, Yona Elian and Assi Dayan	Drama		
?	The 81st Blow (Hebrew: המכה ה-81)	David Bergman, Jacques Ehrlich, Haim Gouri		Documentary		

== See also ==
- 1974 in Israel
