= List of Israeli films of 1975 =

A list of films produced by the Israeli film industry in 1975.

== 1975 releases ==
Premiere	Title	Director	Cast	Genre	Notes	Ref
October 22	Diamonds (Hebrew: יהלומים)	Menahem Golan	Robert Shaw and Richard Roundtree	Crime, Drama	An Israeli-American co-production	

=== Unknown premiere date ===
Premiere	Title	Director	Cast	Genre	Notes	Ref
?	Hagiga B'Snuker (Hebrew: חגיגה בסנוקר, lit. "Party at the Snooker")	Boaz Davidson	Yehuda Barkan, Ze'ev Revach, Joseph Shiloach, Tuvia Tzafir	Comedy, Bourekas film		
?	Hagiga Le'enayim (Hebrew: חגיגה לעיניים, lit. "Feast for the eyes")	Assi Dayan		Drama		
?	Yom Hadin (Hebrew: יום הדין, lit. "Day of Judgment")	George Obadiah		Drama		
?	Yi'ihiyeh Tov Salomonico (Hebrew: יהיה טוב סלומוניקו, lit. "Good will Salomonico")	Alfred Steinhardt	Reuven Bar-Yotam	Drama		
?	Ha-Diber Ha-11 (Hebrew: הדיבר ה-11, lit. "The 11th Commandment")	Shlomo Suriano	Michal Bat-Adam, Yossi Graber	Drama		

== See also ==
- 1975 in Israel
