= List of Israeli films of 1973 =

A list of films produced by the Israeli film industry in 1973.

== 1973 releases ==
Premiere	Title	Director	Cast	Genre	Notes	Ref
?	The Bull Buster (Hebrew: קוראים לי שמיל)	George Obadiah	Paul L. Smith	Drama		
?	The House on Chelouche Street (Hebrew: הבית ברחוב שלוש)	Moshé Mizrahi	Gila Almagor and Michal Bat-Adam	Drama		
?	Abu el-Banat (Hebrew: אבו אל בנאת)	Moshé Mizrahi	Shaike Ophir and Joseph Shiloach	Comedy, Drama	Entered into the 1974 Cannes Film Festival	
?	Big Gus, What's the Fuss? (Hebrew: הבלש האמיץ שוורץ)	Ami Artzi	Ilan Dar, Dubi Gal, Sassi Keshet	Drama		
?	Haham Gamliel (Hebrew: חכם גמליאל)	Joel Silberg		Drama, Comedy		
?	Or Min Hahefker (Hebrew: אור מן ההפקר)	Nissim Dayan		Drama		
?	Hatzad Hasheni (Hebrew: הצעד השני)	Baruch Dienar		Drama		
?	A Gift from Heaven (Hebrew: מתנה משמיים)	Gad Ben-Artzi	Yosi Alfi, Gabi Amrani	Comedy		
?	Shalom (film) (Hebrew: שלום, תפילת הדרך)	Yaky Yosha	Israel Gurion	Drama		
?	Hazmanah L'Retzah (Hebrew: הזמנה לרצח)	Assi Dayan	Gabi Eldor, Oded Kotler, Avraham Morr	Drama		

== See also ==
- 1973 in Israel
