= List of Israeli films of 1978 =

A list of films produced by the Israeli film industry in 1978.

== 1978 releases ==
| Premiere | Title | Director | Cast | Genre | Notes | Ref |
|---|---|---|---|---|---|---|
| ? | Lemon Popsicle (Hebrew: אסקימו לימון) | Boaz Davidson | Yftach Katzur, Zachi Noy, Jonathan Sagall | Comedy, Drama, Romance | Entered into the 28th Berlin International Film Festival | |
| ? | Ha-Shu'al B'Lool Hatarnagalot (Hebrew: השועל בלול התרנגולות, lit. "The Fox in the Chicken Coop") | Ephraim Kishon | Shaike Ophir, Sefi Rivlin | Satire | | |
| ? | Shraga Hakatan (Hebrew: שרגא הקטן, lit. "Little Shraga") | Ze'ev Revach | Ze'ev Revach, Nitza Shaul | Drama | | |
| ? | Yisraelim Matzhikim (Hebrew: ישראלים מצחיקים, lit. "Funny Israelis") | Boaz Davidson | | Comedy | | |
| ? | Sus Etz (Hebrew: סוסעץ, lit. "Rocking horse") | Yaky Yosha | Shmulik Kraus | Drama | | |
| ? | The Uranium Conspiracy | Menahem Golan, Gianfranco Baldanello | | Action, Drama, Thriller | An Israeli-German-Italian co-production | |
| ? | Millioner Betzarot (Hebrew: מיליונר בצרות, lit. "Millionaire in Trouble") | Joel Silberg | Yehuda Barkan, Ya'ackov Bodo | Comedy | | |
| ? | Khirbet Hiza'a (Hebrew: חרבת חיזעה) | Ram Loevy | Gidi Gov, Dalik Volonitz | Drama, War | | |

== See also ==
- 1978 in Israel
