= Mark Dvorzhetski =

- מרק דבורז'צקי
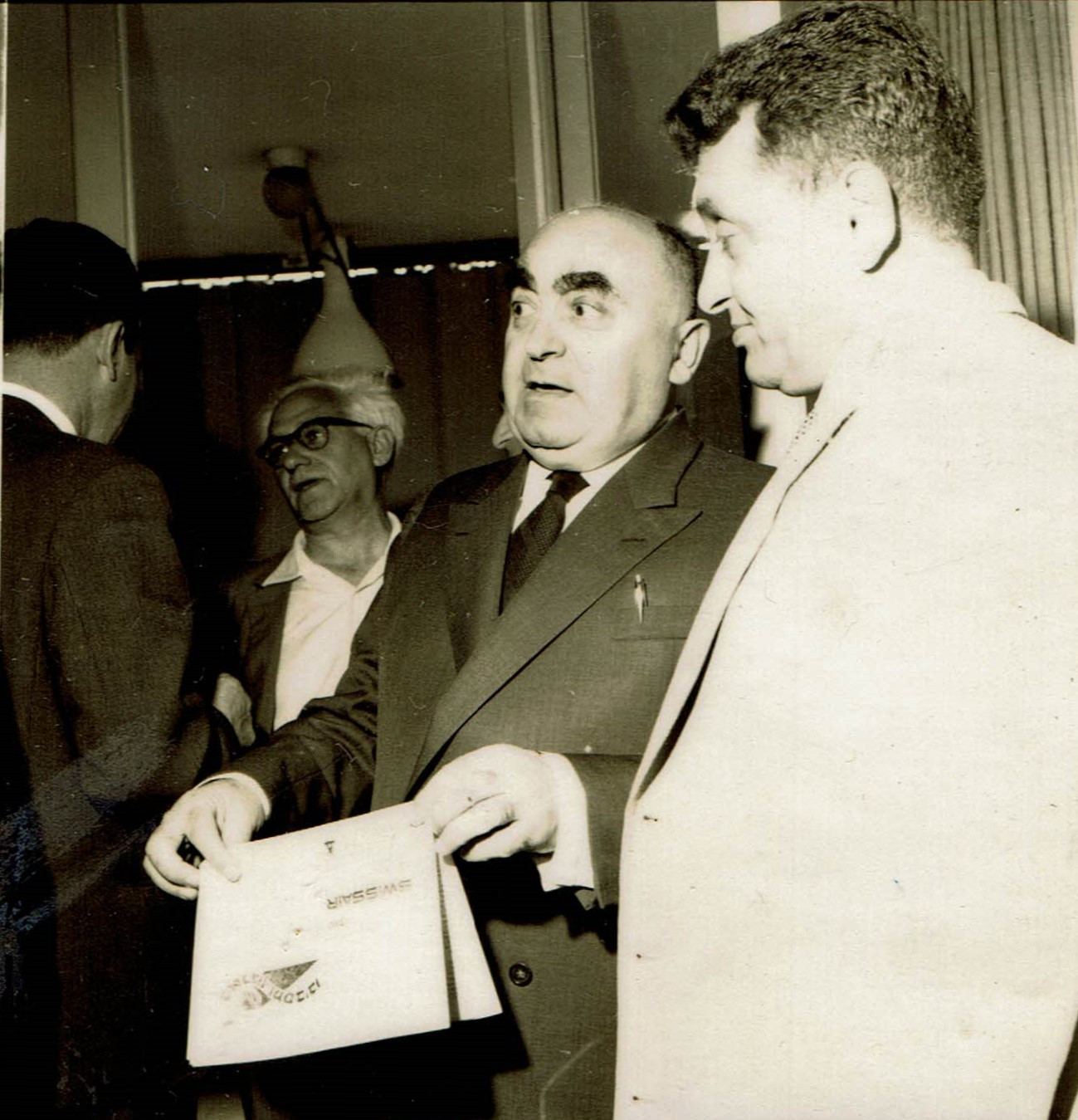
- Dr Mark Dvorzhetski and others at the opening of the Ninth Conference of the Association of War Invalids against Nazism, Tel-Aviv, Beit-Tavori. Dr Dvorzhetski in the center.
- Born: 3 May 1908; Vilnius, Lithuania, Russian Empire
- Died: 15 March 1975 (aged 66); Israel
- Citizenship: Israeli
- Occupations: Social historian, physician
- Writing career
- Language: Hebrew Yiddish
- Notable awards: Israel Prize (1953)

Mark Dvorzhetski (Hebrew: מרק דבורז'צקי; 3 May 1908 – 15 March 1975) was an Israeli physician, historian and Holocaust survivor.

== Biography ==
Mark Dvortzhetski was born in Vilnius (Vilna), Lithuania (at the time part of the Russian Empire). He received his education in Vilnius (Polish: Wilno) during the interwar period, when the city was part of the Second Polish Republic. He completed a medical degree there in 1935, and received a rabbinical diploma in 1938.

At the beginning of the Second World War, in September 1939, Dvorzhetski was drafted into the Polish army as a medical officer. After being taken prisoner by the Germans, he escaped and returned to Vilna.

Under the German occupation of the city, he lived in the Vilna Ghetto (established in September 1941), working in the Jewish hospital. In September 1943 he was deported with other physicians to forced labor in Estonia; his wife, Miriam, and his sister, who volunteered to go with him, perished on the journey there. He worked in the Vaivara concentration camp in Estonia until the fall 1944, when he was transferred to concentration camps in Germany. In 1945 during a death march toward Dachau, he managed to escape into the forest with other Jewish internees, and was subsequently liberated by the French army.

After the war, Dvorzhetski lived in Paris, before immigrating to Israel, in November 1949.

He authored a number of books on the Holocaust, in particular with reference to the Baltic States and the medical profession.

== Awards and recognition ==
- In 1953, Dvorzhetski was awarded the Israel Prize, for social sciences, the inaugural year of the prize.

== Published works ==
- Between the Pieces - an autobiography
- Yerusholaym de-Lita in kamf un umkum. Zikhroynes fun Vilner Geto [Lutte et chute de la Jérusalem-de-Lithuanie. Histoire du Ghetto de Vilna], Paris, L’Union Populaire Juive en France 1948 (Jerusalem of Lithuania in Revolt and in the Holocaust – History of the Vilna Ghetto and the Resistance Movement)
- Europe without Children: Nazi Plans for Biological Destruction
- The Jewish Camps in Estonia
- Hirshke Glik, Paris 1966

== See also ==
- List of Israel Prize recipients
