= Israel Reichert =

Polish-born Israeli agriculturist and biologist

- ישראל רייכרט
- Born: 5 August 1891; Ozorków, Poland
- Died: 22 May 1975 (aged 83); Israel
- Occupations: Agriculturist; Biologist; Phytopathologist
- Awards: Israel Prize (1955)
- Scientific career
- Education: University of Berlin
- Fields: Phytopathology
- Workplaces: Hebrew University of Jerusalem
- Thesis: Fungi of Egypt
- Author abbrev. (botany): Reichert

Israel Reichert (Hebrew: ישראל רייכרט; 5 August 1891 – 22 May 1975) was a Polish-born Israeli agriculturist and biologist who established the field of phytopathology in Israel. He worked on the management of rusts and smuts of field and fruit crops.

== Biography ==
Israel Reichert was born in Ozorkow, Poland to Eliezer Chaim Layzer and Ruchama Reichert. He immigrated to what was then Ottoman Palestine in 1908. He worked as a labourer and then taught natural history. He studied botany at the University of Berlin under Adolf Engler, writing his thesis on the fungi of Egypt.

== Scientific career ==
He applied biogeographical principles to fungi and worked on the management of plant pathogenic fungi. He worked in Italy briefly in 1921 and then moved back to Palestine to start a department of plant pathology. In 1942 he moved to the Hebrew University's School of Agriculture at Rehovot. He served as a professor from 1949 to 1959, co-founding the Palestine Journal of Botany in 1938.

== Awards and recognition ==
- In 1955, Reichert was awarded the Israel Prize, for the life sciences.

== See also ==
- List of Israel Prize recipients
