= Meir Margalit (actor) =

Israeli stage actor (1906–1974)

- מאיר מרגלית
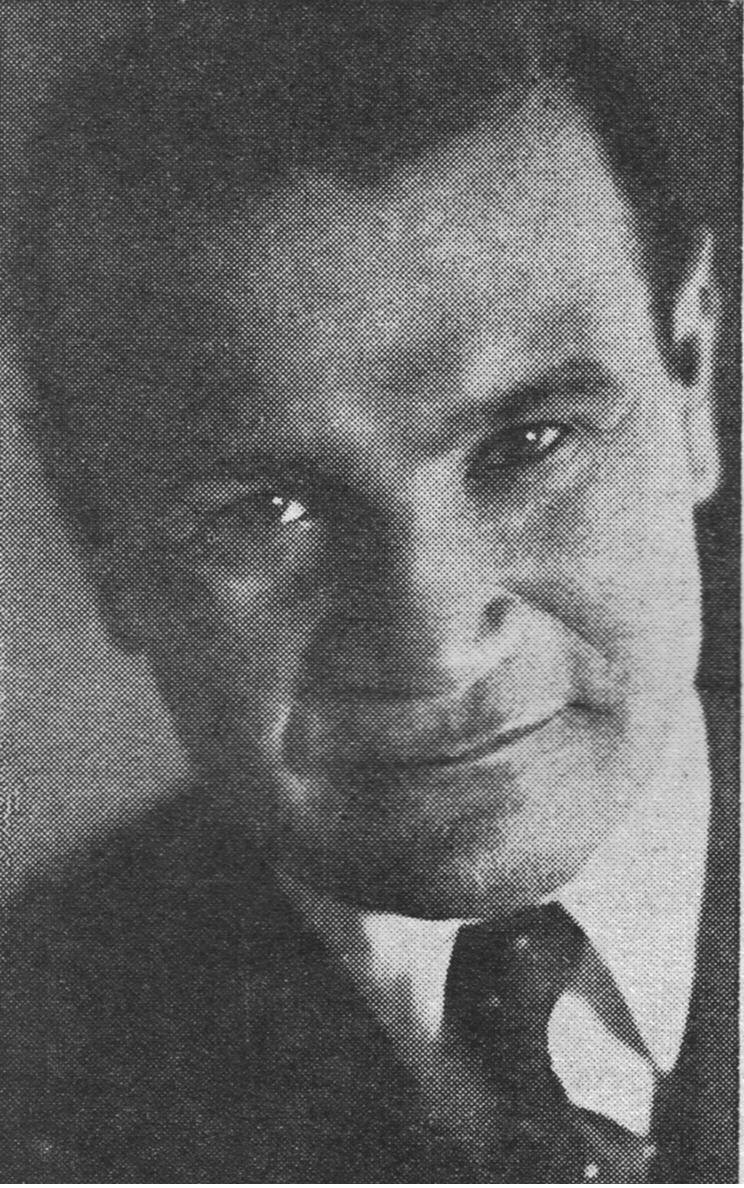
- Meir Margalit (1945)
- Born: 3 May 1906; Ostrołęka, Łomża Governorate, Congress Poland, Russian Empire
- Died: 1974 (aged 67–68)
- Education: Drama school, Ohel Theater
- Occupation: Stage actor
- Notable work: The Good Soldier Schweik
- Awards: Israel Prize (1964); Ramchal Prize (1956); Klausner Prize for Acting (1962)

Meir Margalit (Hebrew: מאיר מרגלית; b. 3 May 1906, d. 1974) was an Israeli stage actor.

== Biography ==
Margalit was born in 1906 in Ostrołęka, in the Łomża Governorate of Congress Poland, then part of in the Russian Empire, and began acting in his home town at the age of 13. In 1922, he emigrated to Mandate Palestine within the framework of the Hechalutz movement. He worked initially as a construction worker in Tel Aviv and Rishon Lezion and as an agricultural worker in Hadera. For two and half years he was a pioneer in the Jerusalem section of Gdud HaAvoda and worked in a quarry.

In 1925, he was chosen and accepted to the drama school of the Ohel Theater under the guidance of Moshe Halevi and in 1929 he joined the acting cast of the theatre.

Margalit excelled in fulfilling comic roles. His most successful role was the title role in The Good Soldier Schweik, the play based on the novel by Jaroslav Hašek and translated into Hebrew by Avigdor Hameiri. The premiere was held on 22 December 1935. This presentation was Ha'ohel's most successful throughout its years of existence and was performed some one thousand and five hundred times. Margalit played the character of Schweik so convincing that Margalit remained identified with the figure of Schweik throughout his acting career.

At the end of the Second World War, Margalit made a tour to play before Jewish volunteers from Palestine serving in the British Army in Europe and the Middle East, as well as Holocaust survivors in Italy and illegal immigrants and deportees held by the British in detention camps in Cyprus.

Another acclaimed role played by Margalit was in the successful comedy "Ha'ketubah" by Ephraim Kishon, performed in Ha'ohel in 1961.

In the early nineteen sixties, he moved briefly to the Habima Theatre, but returned to Ha'ohel, where he continued to act until the theatre closed in 1969.

In 1964, Margalit appeared as Noah Simchon in the film "Simchon Family", based on the popular radio series of the same name, when Samuel Rodensky, hero of the radio series, was abroad at the time.

The last performance by Margalit was in the play "Where is the Land of Israel?" by Ada Ben Nachum, privately produced at the Lilach Theatre in 1972 and 1973.

== Awards and honours ==
- In 1956, Margalit was awarded the Ramchal Prize by Municipality of Tel Aviv.
- In 1962, he received the Klausner Prize for Acting.
- In 1964, he was awarded the Israel Prize, in theatre.
- A street is named after him in the Afeka neighborhood of Tel Aviv.

In 1976, Margalit's family established, in cooperation with the Jerusalem Theatre Archives and Museum, a fund in the name of Margalit to award prizes in the field of theatre arts.

== See also ==
- List of Israel Prize recipients
