= Eli Zeira =

Israeli military intelligence officer (1928–2025)

- אלי זעירא
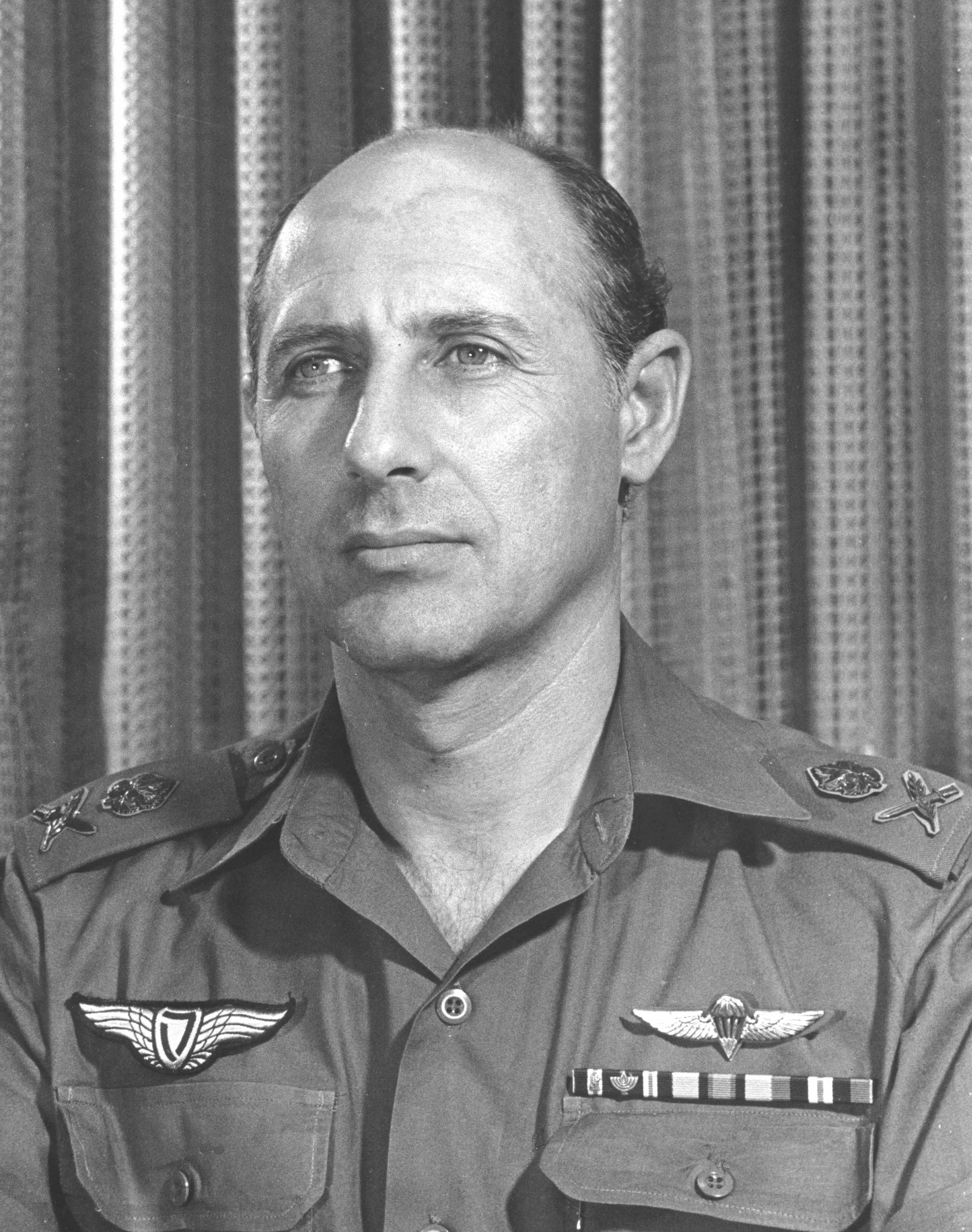
- Born: April 4, 1928; Haifa, Palestine
- Died: November 21, 2025 (aged 97); Tel Aviv, Israel
- Military career
- Allegiance: Israel
- Branch: Israel Defense Forces
- Service years: 1946–1974
- Rank: Major General
- Commands: Director of Aman

Eli Zeira (Hebrew: אלי זעירא; April 4, 1928 – November 21, 2025) was a major general in the Israel Defense Forces. He was director of Aman, Israel's military intelligence, during the 1973 Yom Kippur War. He is most remembered for his ill-conceived prewar assessment that Egypt and Syria would not attack (also known as "The Concept"), despite intelligence to the contrary.

The postwar Agranat Commission, set to investigate the reasons for the costly war, found Zeira to be negligent of his duty, and he resigned.

In 2004, former Mossad Director-General Zvi Zamir accused Zeira of leaking the identity of Ashraf Marwan, an Egyptian billionaire who served as a Mossad informant. The State Prosecutor's Office opened a criminal investigation, which proved inconclusive and was closed in 2012.

== Early life and career ==
Zeira's parents were immigrants to Mandatory Palestine from Poland. His father was an electrical engineer and his mother was a housekeeper. Zeira was born in Haifa on April 4, 1928, where he received elementary and high school education at the Hebrew Reali School. In 1946, when he was 18, he joined the Yiftach Brigade, then part of the Palmach. He fought for the brigade during the 1948 Palestine War, serving as both a company and platoon commander for its 1st Battalion. During the war, he fought against the Arab Liberation Army (ALA) in the Galilee, the Arab Legion at Latrun, and the Egyptian Army in the Negev. He also participated in repelling an offensive by the ALA in kibbutz Tirat Zvi.

Between 1949 and 1950, he led the Southern Command's squad leaders' school. He then enrolled in the United States Army's company commander's school for a year, becoming the first IDF officer to do so, where he learned to fly. When he returned to Israel, he attended the Hebrew University of Jerusalem, graduating with a bachelor's in economics and statistics. In 1951, he became an instructor at a battalion commander's school in Tzrifin.

== Rise in the military ranks ==
Between 1953 and 1954, he commanded the Planning Department of the General Staff. Between 1954 and 1955, he headed IDF chief of staff Moshe Dayan's office, where he was present at weekly meetings with Dayan, then-Defense Minister David Ben-Gurion, and then-director general of the ministry Shimon Peres. He led the Givati Brigade's 51st Battalion in 1956, and after the brigade's disbandment, served as the General Staff's operations head, a role he held during that year's Suez Crisis. He then finished a command and staff course for the US Army in Fort Leavenworth, before serving with the Mossad in an advisory mission for the Ethiopian Army for a year.

Between 1960 and 1962, he commanded the 35th Paratroopers Brigade, before heading the Operations Directorate's Operations Department from 1962 to 1963. He joined the Military Intelligence Directorate (Aman) in 1963, heading its intelligence collection department until 1968. He wrote in an autobiography that at this time, he focused on developing technological innovations for Aman, including for intelligence collection at long-ranges in countries such as Egypt and Syria. His innovations helped the IDF achieve intelligence that led to its victory in the Six-Day War, which he was commended for by the Israel Defense Prize Committee. He became the military attaché to the US and Canada in January 1970.

=== Director of Aman ===
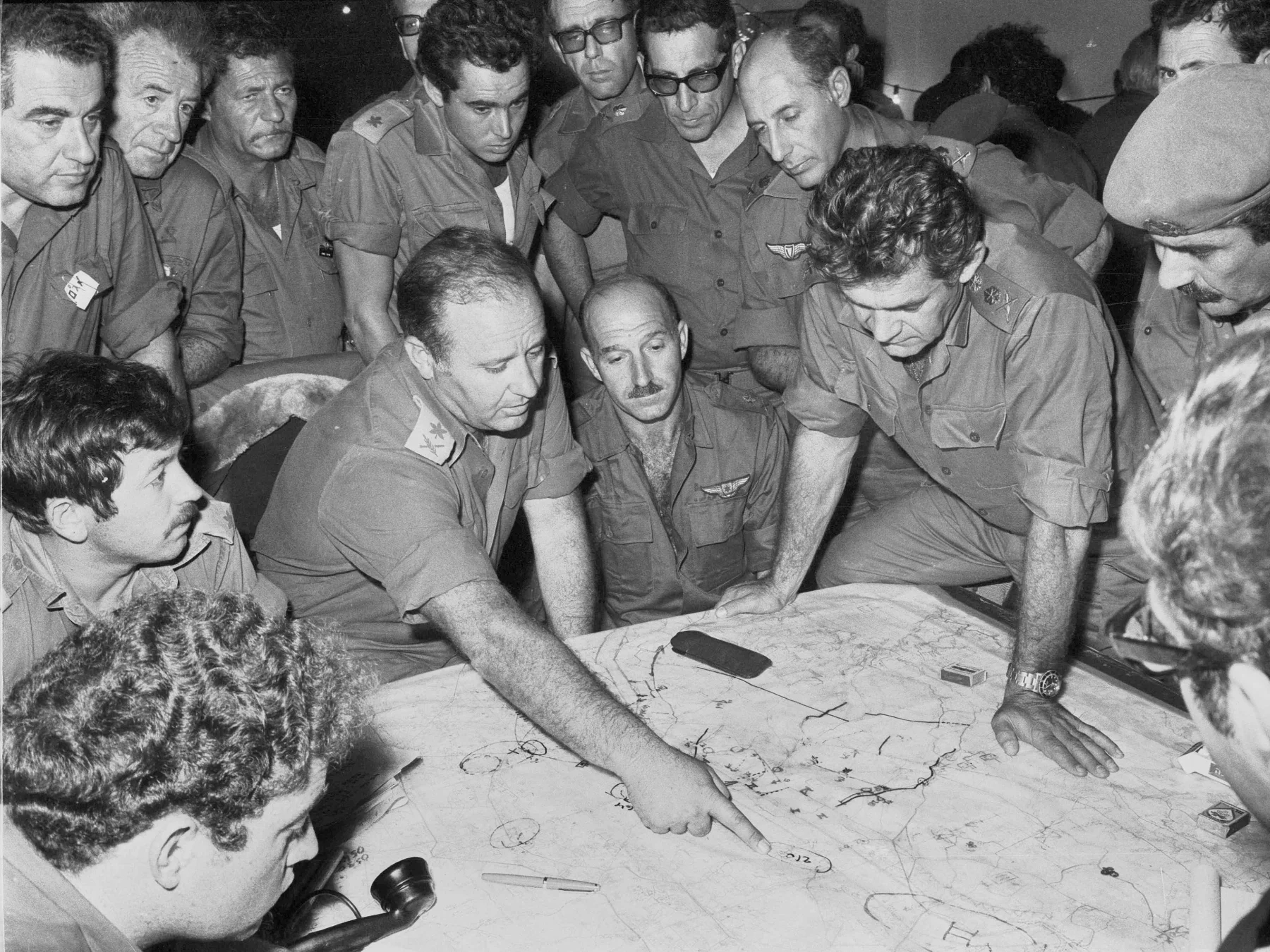
Zeira (fourth from right) and other senior Israeli leaders in a meeting in the Northern Command during the Yom Kippur War

In October 1972, Zeira was appointed as the director of Aman. Before the Yom Kippur War, he assessed in what is known as "The Concept" that Egypt would not declare war on Israel without air superiority, despite intelligence suggesting the contrary, including an October 6, 1973, warning by Mossad head Zvi Zamir. In April 1973, Egyptian spy Ashraf Marwan warned the Mossad that Egypt and Syria would attack Israel in May. Zeira did not believe his warning, and he also doubted Arab military capabilities, stating: "A logical analysis of the situation will show that the Egyptians would make a mistake if they went to war". When no attack occurred, Zeira suspected that Marwan was a double agent attempting to sabotage Israel. A day after a secret meeting by King Hussein of Jordan to the Mossad guesthouse north of Tel Aviv on September 25, 1973, in which he warned of an imminent war, defense minister Dayan held a meeting with Zeira and his deputy, Aryeh Shalev, where they dismissed his warning as too vague. After Egypt conducted a large military drill on the Suez Canal on October 1, he dismissed the threat of war as "very low". During a General Staff meeting on October 5, one day before the war, Zeira assessed that the probability of Egypt and Syria declaring war was "lower than low".

On October 6, Egypt and Syria began a coordinated attack on Israel in the first stage of the Yom Kippur War, catching Israel off guard and leading to heavy losses. After the war, the Agranat Commission was formed to investigate Israel's failures. The commission cleared the political leadership of wrongdoing and found that the key shortcomings stemmed from intelligence failures, particularly Zeira's concept. It also found that Zeira failed to activate Aman's "special means" of collecting intelligence in time, despite the fact that they could have warned of Egypt's offensive. The commission further suspected that Zeira misled Israel's political leadership, including prime minister Golda Meir, IDF chief of staff David Elazar, and defense minister Dayan, into believing that he had activated those "special means". Zeira did not activate these means despite requests from his own staff and Elazar because he was convinced that Egypt would not attack Israel, and believed that activating the means would risk exposing them.

Zeira called the findings baseless, and wrote in his autobiography that "thus the entire blame was placed on those in uniform, and the political leadership came out clean". He argued that the Mossad was responsible for Israel's shortcomings by listening to Marwan, who he claimed was a "double agent" who misguided Israel. The commission did not directly call for Zeira's dismissal, but he left Israel to study at Stanford University and resigned from the IDF anyway, at the age of 47.

== Later life ==
=== State Prosecutor's Office probe ===
In 2004, former Mossad head Zvi Zamir accused Zeira of leaking the identity of Ashraf Marwan, an Egyptian billionaire and senior advisor to president Anwar Sadat who covertly provided Israel with valuable intelligence, including a warning of Egypt's 1973 attack. Zeira said that he had relied on news publications that had already named Marwan, and filed a libel lawsuit against Zamir in April 2005. A criminal probe into Zeira was conducted by the State Prosecutor's Office. The case was arbitrated by retired Supreme Court judge Theodor Orr, who concluded that Zeira had indeed leaked Marwan's identity and ordered him to pay compensation. The Attorney General closed the case with no charges in 2012, due to Zeira's age and his contributions to Israel’s security.

=== Personal life and death ===
Zeira married his friend, Ester, in 1951, and had three daughters. He died on November 21, 2025, at the age of 97.
