= Agranat Commission =

Israeli governmental commission

The Agranat Commission (Hebrew: ועדת אגרנט) was a National Commission of Inquiry set up to investigate failings in the Israel Defense Forces in the prelude to the Yom Kippur War when Israel was found unprepared for the Egyptian attack against the Bar Lev Line and a simultaneous attack by Syria in the Golan—the first phase in a war in which 2,812 Israeli soldiers were killed.

== Commission ==
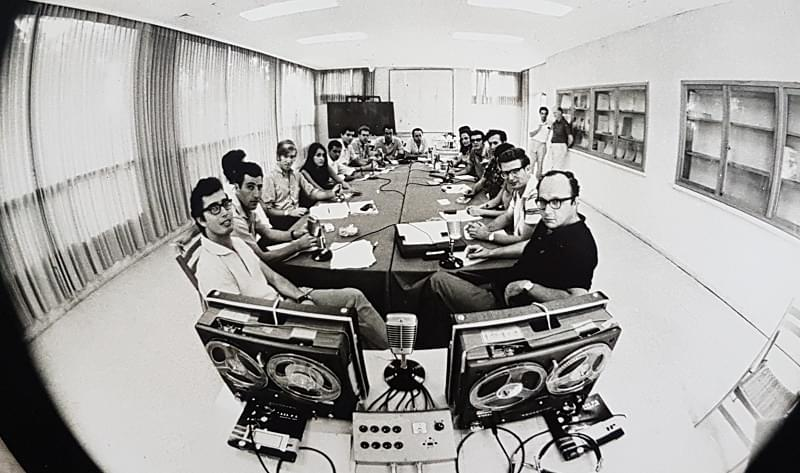
Recording and transcription of the Agranat Commission

The commission was an official National Commission of Inquiry appointed by the Israeli government to investigate the circumstances leading to the outbreak of the Yom Kippur War. The Committee was headed by Shimon Agranat, Chief Justice of Israel's Supreme Court. Its other members were Justice Moshe Landau, State Comptroller Yitzchak Nebenzahl, and former Chiefs of Staff Yigael Yadin and Chaim Laskov. The Committee sat for 140 sessions, during which they listened to the testimony of 58 witnesses. It was established on 21 November 1973 with a remit to investigate:

1. The intelligence information for the days preceding the Yom Kippur War on the enemy's moves and intentions to launch the war, the evaluation of this information, and the decisions taken by the responsible military and civil authorities in response thereto.
2. The general deployment of the IDF in case of war, its state of readiness during the days preceding the Yom Kippur War, and its operations up to the containment of the enemy.

It did not examine the later stages of the war when the IDF went on the offensive.

On 31 December 1973, elections that had been delayed by the war took place. Likud, a new political party, won 39 seats in the Knesset. Newly elected Member of Knesset and one of the Likud founders, Reserve General Ariel Sharon gave a newspaper interview in which he was quoted as saying that he would disobey orders that he felt were against the interests of the State or his subordinates. This caused so much public concern that Sharon was asked to appear before the Commission, which accepted his testimony that the quote was in the context of a specific event that occurred under very exceptional circumstances.

== Findings ==
The commission's report was published in three parts. The interim report, released 1 April 1974, called for the dismissal of a number of senior officers in the IDF and caused such controversy that Prime Minister Golda Meir was forced to resign. The second part was published on 10 July 1974 and contained the reasons for the conclusions of the first report. The final part of the report was published on 30 January 1975. One consequence of the Commission's investigation was the "Basic Law: The Army (1975)", clarifying the IDF's legal status.

=== Interim report ===
Published on 1 April 1974, the interim report caused a sensation. Its headline recommendation was the dismissal of four senior officers in military intelligence: The Chief of Military Intelligence Major General Eliyahu Zeira, his deputy Brigadier Aryeh Shalev, the head of the Egyptian Department Lt Colonel Yona Bendman, and the chief intelligence officer in the Southern Command Lt Colonel David Gedalia. The report also was critical of what it called the "concept" in military intelligence thinking. The "concept" was based on the assumption that Egypt would only attack if it had the air power to take on the Israeli Air Force. Military intelligence also thought that Syria would only attack if Egypt did. In the absence of any upgrading of Egypt's air force, the directorate concluded there was no threat of imminent war. This assumption led to complacency and evidence being ignored. For example, on 1 October and again on 3 October 1973, Lieutenant Benjamin Siman Yov, order of battle intelligence officer for the Southern Command, gave his superior Lt Colonel Gadalia documents indicating Egypt's war preparations.

In its examination of the senior echelons of the IDF, the commission also concluded that GOC Southern Command Shmuel Gonen should be dismissed. After his departure, Gonen argued that he had only been in the post for a few months and that the command had been neglected by his predecessor Ariel Sharon. The Commission also found the Chief of Staff David Elazar responsible, but it refused to give an opinion on the responsibility of the Minister of Defense Moshe Dayan, arguing that this was beyond its remit.

This report caused public uproar and unhappiness in the army. In Abba Eban's words "The conclusions ... did not seem to accord with the narrative" Yitzhak Rabin walked out of the cabinet with Elazar. Thousands of demonstrators took to the streets. Nine days after the publication of the Interim Report, Golda Meir announced the resignation of her government.

After his dismissal, Elazar maintained that had he been given more of the information, he would have mobilized the IDF sooner. This only confirmed the Commission's criticisms about the reliance on a single avenue for intelligence analysis. Elazar died two years later aged 50.

=== Final report ===
The final part of the report was published on 30 January 1975. The completed report was 1,500 pages long, with 746 pages devoted to the fighting in the south and 311 to the northern front. Forty-two pages were made public, the remainder being classified. Besides the IDF's failures, it looked at the issues around civilian and political control of the army and found a "lack of clear definitions...". Surprisingly, they could not find a clear statement of civilian control over the military. They argued that the Basic Law: The Cabinet (1968) implied authority when it stated that the Cabinet has authority over all areas not covered by other legislation. Later critics argued that the Cabinet's authority stemmed from the IDF Order (1948), which authorised the Minister of Defence to set up the army. Further questions arose over hundreds of orders issued by Chiefs of Staff since 1948 without authorisation from the Minister of Defence. These discoveries led to the swift enactment of Basic Law: The Army (1975). Its main clause stated:

- The Army is subject to the authority of the Cabinet.
- The Minister responsible is the Minister of Defense.
- The supreme commander of the Army is the Chief of Staff.
- The Chief of Staff is subject to the authority of the Cabinet and subordinate to the Minister of Defence.

The new law still left some issues unresolved, such as who appointed a Chief of Staff and whether the Chief of Staff was the most senior officer in the army.

In practice, the controversy about the report's absence of criticism of Moshe Dayan led to a strengthening of the Chief of Staff's position since he could argue that if the Chief of Staff had sole responsibility, it must be the Chief of Staff's decision. The Chief of Staff was now a regular attendee of cabinet meetings.

The Commission was critical of the standard of everyday discipline in the IDF: "Discipline is indivisible. For example, a soldier who becomes accustomed in time of peace not to observe the minor rules, such as in matters of personal appearance, without being alerted to this failure by his superior officer, will in the end be negligent in carrying out operational orders."

As a response to the Commission's criticism of using military intelligence as the sole route for analysis of information, the Foreign Ministry established a Research and Planning Department. Despite this, five years later the 29th Comptroller's Report into the conduct of the IDF during Operation Litani, which left 21 IDF soldiers dead, concluded that conditions remained the same as in 1973. The Report's author was Yitzhak Nebenzahl, a member of the Agranat Commission.

The full text of the report, except for 48 pages, was made public on 1 January 1995. The remaining 48 pages were released in 2006 following review by the Commission.

== Critique of the report ==
The findings of the Agranat Commission have been the focus of sharp debate among the Israeli public up until today. Particular criticism relates to its exoneration of the country's political leadership, especially Defense Minister Dayan. According to the Report: "As long as he accepts the opinions of his advisers, he does not bear any personal responsibility."

Further criticism responds to the Commission's recommendations, stemming from the failure of military intelligence to assess the Arab states' intent, that the IDF should not consider the intentions of hostile states, but rather their capacity for war. Thirty years later, Giora Eiland, head of the National Security Council, wrote: "Both the proscription against considering intent and the concentration on the prevention of threats—two central messages of the Agranat Commission [Report]—frustrated and delayed the rebuilding and preparedness of the IDF for years."
