= David Elazar =

Ninth Chief of Staff of the Israel Defense Forces

- דוד אלעזר
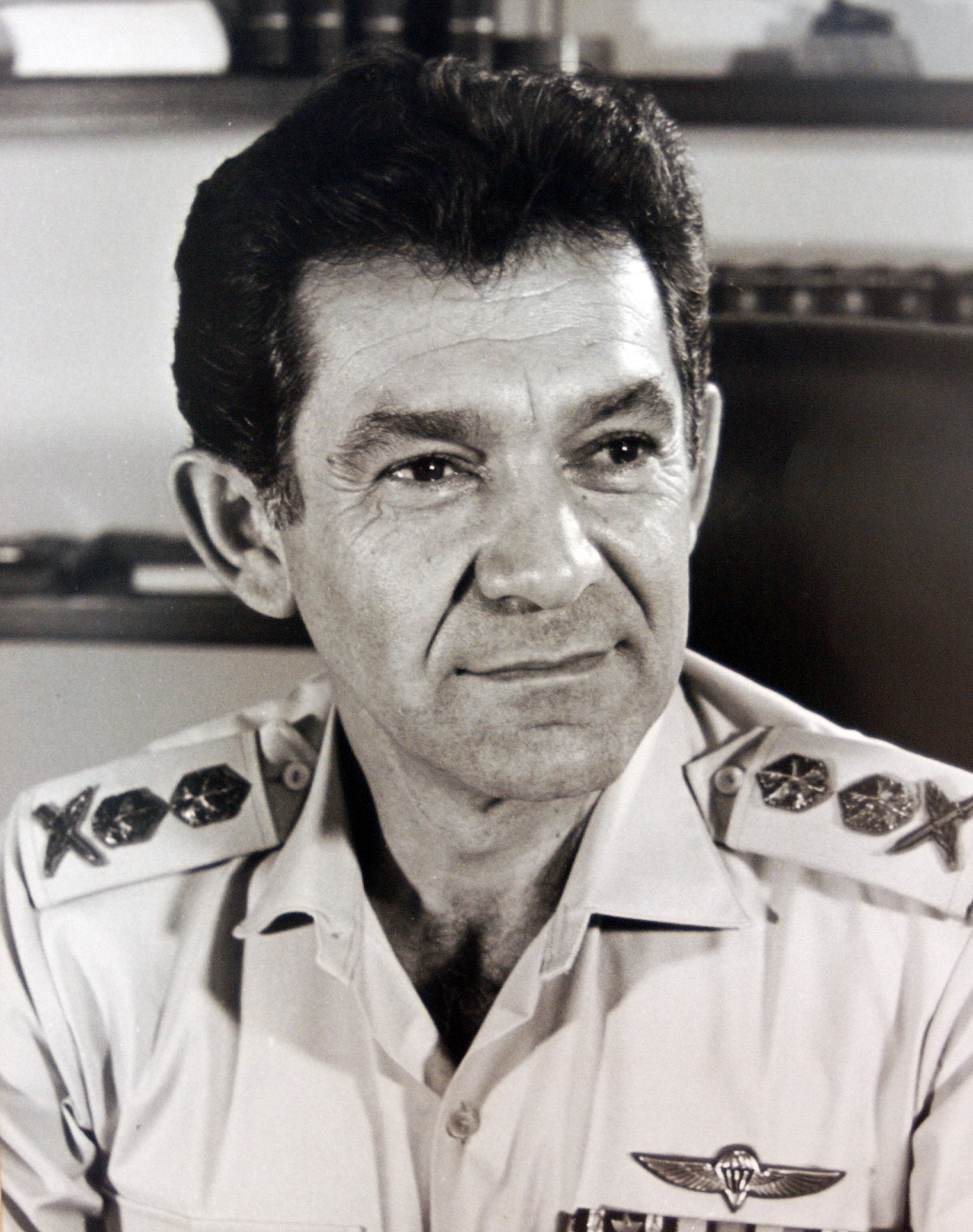
- David Elazar (Dado)
- Born: 27 August 1925; Sarajevo, Yugoslavia
- Died: 15 April 1976 (aged 50); Tel Aviv-Yafo, Israel
- Military career
- Allegiance: Israel
- Branch: Palmach; Israel Defense Forces
- Service years: 1942–1973
- Rank: Rav Aluf (Chief of Staff; highest rank)
- Nicknames: Dado, Big D
- Commands: Director of Operations; Chief of Staff
- Conflicts: 1948 Arab–Israeli War; Suez Crisis; Six-Day War; Yom Kippur War

David "Dado" Elazar (Hebrew: דוד אלעזר; 27 August 1925 – 15 April 1976) was an Israeli senior military officer who was the ninth Chief of Staff of the Israel Defense Forces (IDF), serving in that capacity from 1972 to 1974. He was forced to resign in the aftermath of the Yom Kippur War.

== Early life ==
David (Dado) Elazar was born in Sarajevo, Yugoslavia, to a family of Sephardic heritage. He emigrated to Israel in 1940 with the Youth Aliyah program and settled on kibbutz Ein Shemer. He soon joined the Palmach and fought in many important battles during the 1948 Arab–Israeli War, including the Battle of San Simon Monastery in Jerusalem. As a soldier, he advanced through the ranks, eventually serving as commander of the famous HaPortzim Battalion of the Harel Brigade.

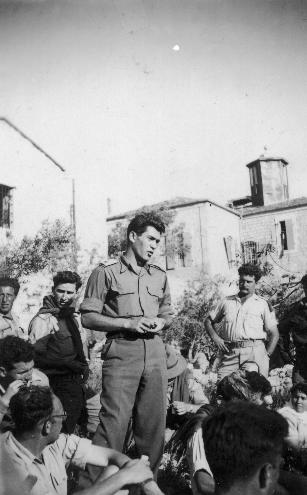
David Elazar addressing members of Harel Brigade. 1948. Rafael Eitan standing on left.

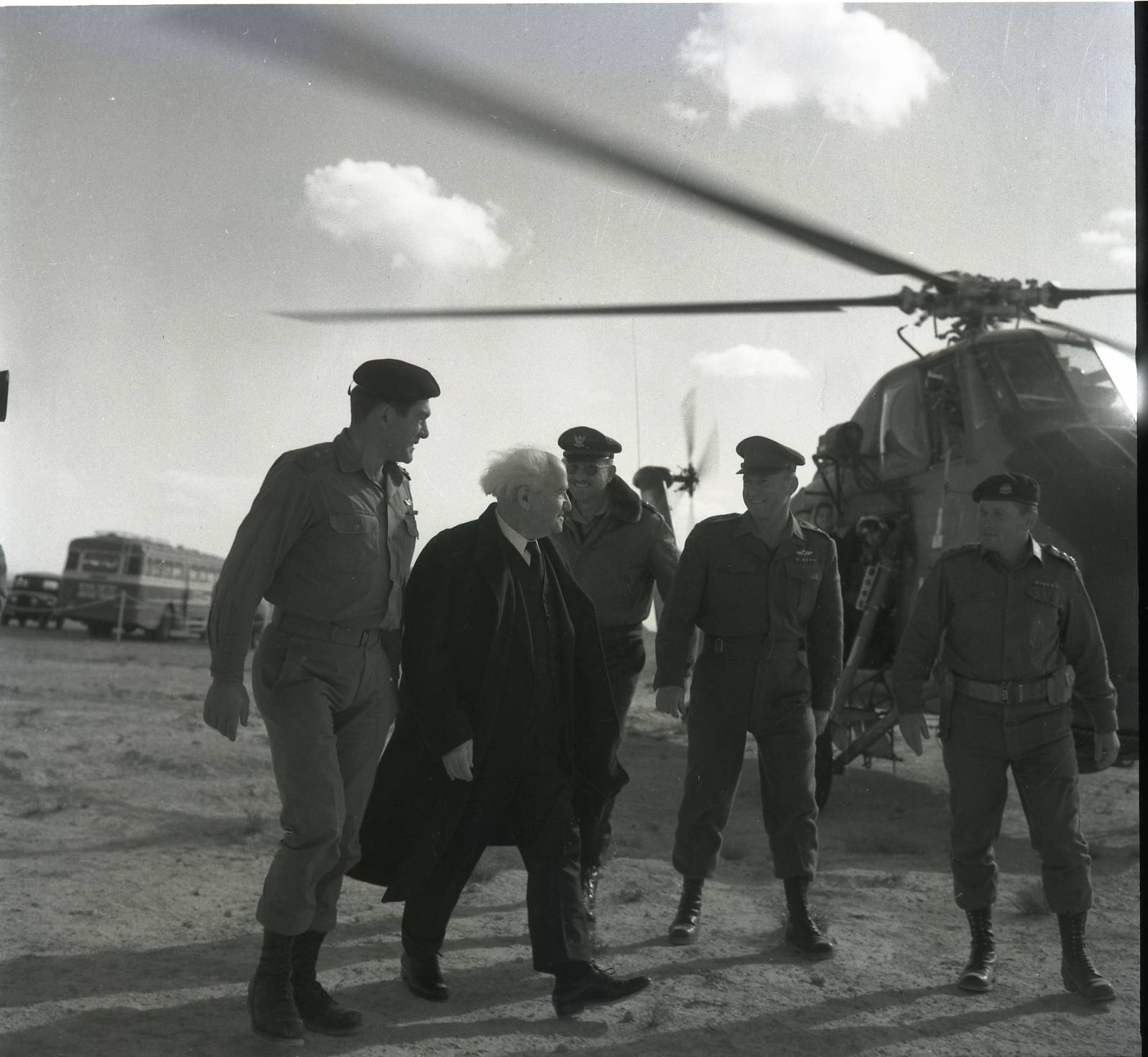
David Elazar to the right of David Ben-Gurion and other officers, 1962.

Elazar remained in the army after the war, transferring to the armored corps following the 1956 Sinai campaign. He served as deputy to the commander of the corps, Haim Bar Lev, who took over as commander of the armored corps in 1961. He remained in this position until 1964, when he was appointed Chief of the Northern Command, a position he held until 1969. During the Six-Day War of 1967, he was a crucial advocate for the occupation of the strategic Golan Heights, which was then a part of Syria, and he oversaw its capture in just two days.

After the war, Elazar served as the chief operations officer on the general staff. On 1 January 1972, he was appointed Chief of Staff.

== Chief of General Staff ==
The first months of his tenure were spent combating terrorism. On 30 May, the Japanese Red Army killed 25 civilians and wounded 71 more at an attack on Lod Airport, Israel's leading transportation hub (see: Lod Airport Massacre). On 5 September of that year, another group attacked Israeli athletes at the 1972 Summer Olympics in Munich. The attack became known as the Munich Massacre. In response to these attacks, Elazar ordered what was, until then, the largest strike against Palestinian bases in Syria and Lebanon. Three Syrian jets were downed, and dozens of fedayeen were killed in a heavy artillery barrage. In Operation Spring of Youth, which took place on the night of 9–10 April 1973, dozens more Palestinians, including several key Palestinian leaders, were assassinated in Beirut by the IDF.

One of the decisions made by Elazar during his tenure was the order to down a Libyan passenger jet that strayed into Israeli airspace and was suspected to be on a terrorist mission when it did not respond. The plane was shot down by the Israeli Air Force over the Sinai Peninsula under direct orders from Elazar, killing over 100 civilians. Only later was it discovered that this was a civilian aircraft that had made a navigational error.

On 27 May 1973, the IDF announced a state of emergency and reserve troops were called up in response to a movement of Egyptian troops. The state of emergency was cancelled when it became clear that this was only an exercise. This event had a major impact on the General Staff, as it led them to believe that the Egyptian forces were not preparing for war, later that year, on Yom Kippur. However, after the war, it became apparent that these frequent maneuvers carried out by the Egyptians were part of an elaborate ruse meant to induce complacency in the Israelis regarding the true intentions of Egyptian troop movements at the time the actual attack took place.

On 13 September, Israel shot down thirteen Syrian fighter jets, which had attempted to down Israeli aircraft.

== The Yom Kippur War ==
=== Events leading up to the war ===
In 1957, Israel was forced, under American pressure, to withdraw from the Sinai which it had occupied since attacking Egypt the previous year. Closing the Tiran strait to Israeli ships by Egyptian President Gamal Abdel Nasser in 1967 was one of the major causes for the 1967 war, during which Israel re-occupied the Sinai peninsula. At 4 a.m. on Yom Kippur, an unequivocal warning was delivered by Mossad head Zvi Zamir – "Today war will break out" to the Prime Minister, the Minister of Defense, the Chief of Staff and other officials. Elazar met with Defense Minister Moshe Dayan at 6 a.m. and demanded full mobilization, a preemptive strike in Syria and photo flights using unmanned aircraft across the canal. Due to heavy cloud cover in the Golan, a preemptive strike was planned not against the Syrian anti-aircraft missile array but against Syrian airfields. Moshe Dayan refused a preemptive strike and reconnaissance flights for fear of losing American support in the event that Israel was the first to launch a war. Dayan did not approve full mobilization of reserves, but approved the mobilization of a division to the south and a division to the north and the Air Force reserve. At 9 a.m. a discussion was held chaired by Prime Minister Golda Meir with members of the kitchen, the Chief of Staff, the Chief of Military Intelligence and the Head of Mossad. In the discussion, Golda Meir accepted Elazar's position regarding the full mobilization he demanded, but on the other hand, Moshe Dayan's opinion on the other two issues and did not approve of a preemptive strike and reconnaissance flight.

On 1 October 1973, the armies of Egypt and Syria were placed on alert. Due to an erroneous intelligence assessment and poor decisions by the Israeli military, the IDF responded with only limited measures, few reserve units were called up, and it was determined that war was "unlikely." In the early hours of 6 October (on Yom Kippur, the holiest of the Jewish holidays), Elazar finally became convinced that war would indeed break out that same day, even though the Chief of Military Intelligence Major General Eli Zeira and the Minister of Defense Moshe Dayan still believed that this was highly unlikely. Dayan's conviction had two major consequences:

1. Dayan refused to approve Elazar's request for a general call-up of the reserves (Elazar nevertheless eventually decided independently on a limited call-up, beginning on 5 October).
2. Dayan refused to approve Elazar's recommendation that the IDF engage in a pre-emptive air strike, planned for 11:00 a.m. on Yom Kippur (the airforce was ready for the strike, but its jets never took off).

=== The war ===
At 2:00 p.m. in 6 October, during Yom Kippur, the armies of Egypt and Syria launched a coordinated attack against Israel. In many ways, this came as a surprise to the IDF and its command.

After a series of fierce battles to block the invading armies, a failed counter-offensive in the Sinai, and heavy losses to Israel's airforce and ground troops alike, the incursion was finally halted. On 11 October, fighting in the north was pushed back across the Syrian frontier, and on 16 October, Israeli troops crossed the Suez Canal under the command of General Ariel Sharon.

In the early days of the fighting, Elazar was one of very few Israeli commanders who managed to keep his cool and even maintain an optimistic view of where events were heading. This was in especially sharp contrast with the political leadership, most notably Moshe Dayan, who spoke of the "destruction of the Third Jewish Commonwealth." At the same time, the war highlighted sharp personal differences among the top military brass, particularly along the Southern Front—some of these differences have yet [when?] to be resolved. At one point in the fighting, Elazar was forced to replace the Chief of the Southern Command, Major General Shmuel Gonen (known as "Gorodish") with the former Chief of General Staff Haim Bar-Lev. He also enlisted the help of generals Rehavam Zeevi and Aharon Yariv, both of whom had recently retired from the IDF, as his special advisers.

By the end of the war, the IDF had penetrated deep into Syrian territory. Mount Hermon, which had been taken from Israel at the start of the war, returned to Israeli control. On the Southern Front, the Egyptian Third Army was surrounded in the Sinai, and Israeli troops had occupied the southern sector of the west bank of the Suez Canal fighting with the unconventional tactics of General Ariel Sharon. Nevertheless, despite these military achievements, Israel paid dearly in casualties. The Egyptians still held some territory east of the canal, and none of the major cities were captured. Although Suez did come under siege, the Battle of Suez was ultimately an Israeli failure, costing 80 IDF troops killed, 120 wounded and 40 tanks destroyed.

=== The aftermath ===
The high casualty rate and the fact that Israel was caught unprepared, in terms of both intelligence and operations, led to a wave of public protests throughout the country.

On 21 November, as soon as the war ended, the Agranat Commission was set up to investigate why the IDF was so poorly prepared for the war. The commission met for several months. It held 140 sessions and listened to dozens of witnesses before releasing its interim report on 1 April 1974, calling for Elazar to be removed as Chief of Staff. The report stated that "Elazar bears personal responsibility for the assessment of the situation and the preparedness of the IDF." It found him to be excessively confident in the IDF's ability to contain Egyptian and Syrian attacks, and faulted him for not visiting the front lines to consult with field commanders. The commission recommended that he be removed from his post alongside military intelligence chief Eli Zeira. The Commission also found the Chief of Staff David Elazar responsible, but it refused to give an opinion on the responsibility of the Minister of Defense Moshe Dayan, arguing that this was beyond its remit.

Elazar immediately submitted his resignation to the government, claiming that he had been mistreated, especially since the report suggested no sanctions against the country's political leadership, contending he had been wrongly blamed for matters that had been the responsibility of the government, particularly of Defense Minister Moshe Dayan. He also complained that his actions during the war were never considered, noting that the report had held him responsible for the early failures of the war but did not give him credit for the subsequent recovery and counteroffensive which left Israel in an advantageous position at the war's end. In his resignation letter, Elazar wrote:

It is not the job of the chief of staff to oversee all tactical details. I testify that as Northern Front Commander in 1967 I submitted a general plan to the chief of staff and did not receive detailed plans...I cannot comprehend why the commission thought that I should have concluded that reserves should be called on 5 October, and yet the Minister of Defense could not have arrived at the same conclusion, while we had exactly the same information and there was no one on the general staff who thought or suggested that reserves be called.

Elazar received widespread public sympathy, with many Israelis viewing him as a scapegoat. After retiring from the IDF, Elazar became managing director of ZIM Integrated Shipping Services.

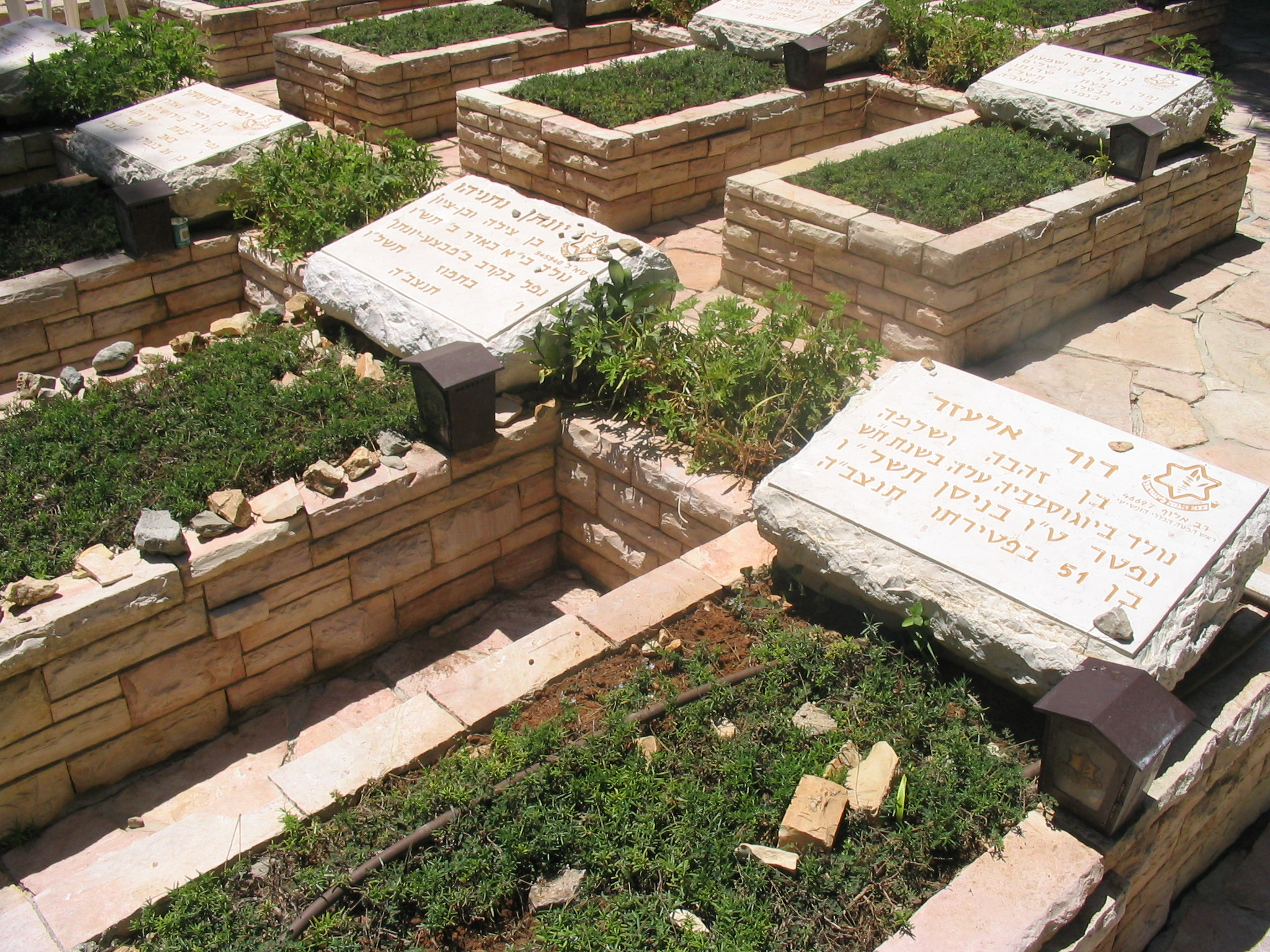
Elazar's grave in Mount Herzl

On 15 April 1976, he died of a heart attack while swimming in a pool near his home in Tel Aviv. He is buried on Mount Herzl, Jerusalem.

== Legacy ==
Elazar remains a controversial figure in Israel. The conclusion made by the Agranat Commission that he was personally responsible for the failure to prepare for war was not fully accepted by the public. The consensus today holds that Elazar was an extremely capable war leader who kept his cool in a crisis situation and made the correct strategic decisions.

Israeli General Aviezer Ya'ari, head of the IDF's research department credits two specific decisions made by Elazar relatively early in the fighting as crucial to achieving Israel's eventual tactical victory in the war despite the significant setbacks it suffered initially. One was Elazar's decision to shift divisional reserve forces that were being held opposite the Jordanian border in the event Jordan was to enter the war to the Golan Heights sector instead. These forces then proved instrumental in first halting the Syrians' rapid advance, then turning the tide of battle against them. The second was his decision, despite vigorous objections from his field generals, to postpone further counter-attacks in the Sinai until the Egyptians, which had dug in defensive positions alongside the east bank of the Suez Canal, first started an offensive push eastwards from those positions. This led to the Battle of the Sinai, which was fought on terms better suited to Israeli tactics and which they decisively won, thus weakening overall Egyptian resistance and facilitating a hard-fought but eventually successful counteroffensive that allowed the IDF to cross the Suez Canal and trap most of the Egyptian Third Army on its eastern bank by the end of the war.

== See also ==
- Agranat Commission
- List of Israel's Chiefs of the General Staff
