= Chief of the General Staff (Israel) =

Head of the Israel Defense Forces

- ראש המטה הכללי

- Flag of the Chief of the General Staff

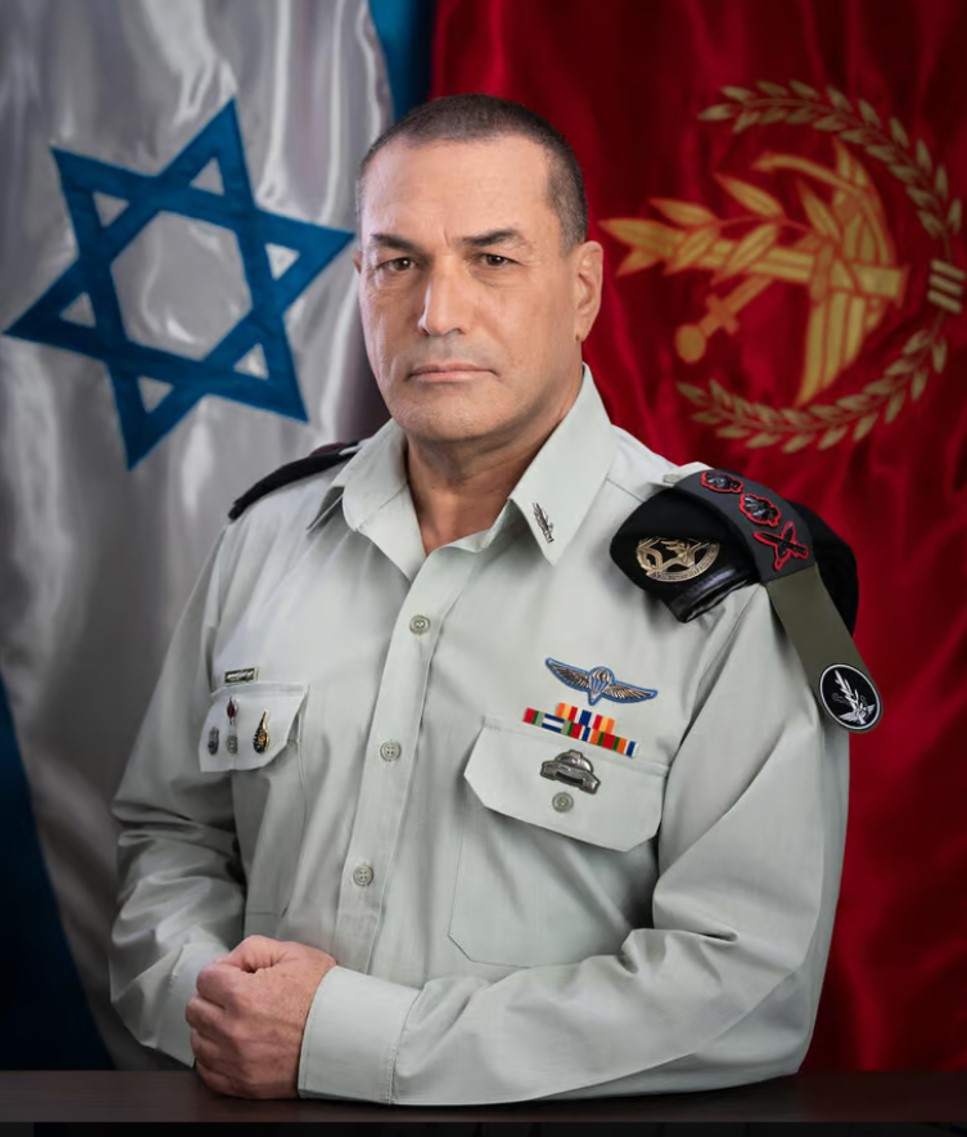
- Incumbent; Rav Aluf Eyal Zamir since 5 March 2025
- Ministry of Defense
- Abbreviation: Ramatkal
- Member of: General Staff
- Reports to: Minister of Defense Government of Israel
- Seat: Rabin Camp, HaKirya, Tel Aviv
- Nominator: Minister of Defense
- Appointer: Cabinet of Israel
- Term length: 3 years; can be extended by 1 year
- Formation: 1 June 1947; 79 years ago
- First holder: Rav Aluf Yaakov Dori
- Deputy: Deputy Chief

The Chief of the General Staff (Hebrew: רֹאשׁ הַמַּטֶּה הַכְּלָלִי, romanized: Rosh hamateh haklali), abbreviated Ramatkal (רמטכ"ל), is the professional head of the Israel Defense Forces (IDF). The current chief of the general staff is Eyal Zamir, having taken office on 5 March 2025.

The chief of the general staff is nominated by the government on advice of the Minister of Defense, and serves a three-year term, extendable by one year only.

At any given time, the chief of the general staff is the only active officer holding the IDF's highest rank, rav aluf (רַב־אַלּוּף), which is usually translated into English as lieutenant general, a three-star rank. The only exception to this rule occurred during the Yom Kippur War, when former Chief of the General Staff Haim Bar-Lev, who was a cabinet member at the outbreak of and during the war, was brought out of retirement and installed as chief of Southern Command. For a brief period, he and Chief of the General Staff David Elazar were both in active service with the rank of rav aluf.

== History ==
The role of the chief of the general staff began with the Haganah organization, where it was named after the head of the general staff of the Haganah. With the establishment of the IDF, the chief of defense and the hief of staff, headed by Yaakov Dori, were converted to head the IDF.

The chief of the general staff is officially appointed for a three-year term, which can be extended for another year. An exception was Rafael Eitan, whose term was extended twice, and he served a total of five years. On the other hand, there were several chiefs of staff who did not complete their full term: Yigal Yadin resigned amid disagreements over the IDF budget, Mordechai Maklef served for only one year at his request, David Elazar was forced to resign following the recommendations of the Agranat Commission investigating the Yom Kippur War, and Dan Halutz resigned due to criticism of the Second Lebanon War. Also, two chiefs of staff have given up part of their tenure extension: Amnon Lipkin-Shahak wanted to end his term in the middle of the fourth year, due to his desire to move into politics and run for prime minister. Haim Laskov asked not to serve a fourth year due to his disagreements with Shimon Peres.

In 2005, Ariel Sharon and Shaul Mofaz did not extend Moshe Ya'alon's term to a fourth year, during which he was interpreted as a dismissal in light of Ya'alon's opposition to the disengagement plan. In order to prevent such problems in the future, and as was done for other positions such as that of the President of the State, Defense Minister Amir Peretz appointed Major General Gabi Ashkenazi in 2007 for a period of four years, thus removing the uncertainty regarding the addition of the fourth year. Ashkenazi raised the issue of extending his term to a fifth year.

At the end of his term, the chief of the general staff (like other senior members of the Israeli defense establishment) has a cooling-off period of three years before he can be elected a Member of the Knesset, be appointed a Minister in the Government or be elected Prime Minister.

== Legal position ==
The position of ramatkal is defined in the Basic Law: The Military (1976), clause three:

- The supreme command rank in the military is that of the chief of the general staff
- The chief of the general staff is to be placed under the authority of the government and subordinate to the defense minister
- The chief of the general staff is to be appointed by the government, according to the recommendation of the Defense Minister

The chief of the general staff is formally appointed once every three years, with the government often extending the term to four years, and in one occasion, even five.

== Significance ==
Given the importance of the IDF in Israeli society, the chief of the general staff is an important public figure in Israel. On appointment of a new chief of the general staff, mass-circulation papers such as Yedioth Ahronoth and Israel Hayom customarily provide their readers with large-scale portrait photos of the new chief. Former chiefs of the general staff often parlay the prominence of their position into political life, and sometimes the business world. Two chiefs of the general staff, (Yitzhak Rabin and Ehud Barak), have become prime minister of Israel and eleven others (Yigael Yadin, Moshe Dayan, Tzvi Tzur, Haim Bar-Lev, Mordechai Gur, Rafael Eitan, Amnon Lipkin-Shahak, Shaul Mofaz, Moshe Ya'alon, Gabi Ashkenazi, and Benny Gantz) have served in the Knesset. Of these, only Tzur did not get appointed to the Cabinet.

Six former chiefs of the general staff (Dayan, Rabin, Barak, Mofaz, Ya'alon, and Gantz) held the position of defense minister, widely considered to be one of the most powerful ministerial posts in the country and the immediate civilian superior of the chief of the general staff. Moshe Dayan served also as foreign minister. Soon after his discharge, Dan Halutz became the CEO of a car importer. Ehud Barak took a hiatus from politics twice after defeats for re-election and pursued international business ventures.

== List of Chiefs of the General Staff ==
The Chiefs of the General Staff have been:

No.	Portrait	Chief of the General Staff	Took office	Left office	Time in office	Ref.
1	Yaakov Dori	Yaakov Dori (1899–1973)	1 June 1947	9 November 1949	2 years, 161 days	
2	Yigael Yadin	Yigael Yadin (1917–1984)	9 November 1949	7 December 1952	3 years, 28 days	
3	Mordechai Maklef	Mordechai Maklef (1920–1978)	7 December 1952	6 December 1953	364 days	
4	Moshe Dayan	Moshe Dayan (1915–1981)	6 December 1953	29 January 1958	4 years, 54 days	
5	Haim Laskov	Haim Laskov (1919–1982)	29 January 1958	1 January 1961	2 years, 338 days	
6	Tzvi Tzur	Tzvi Tzur (1923–2004)	1 January 1961	1 January 1964	3 years, 0 days	
7	Yitzhak Rabin	Yitzhak Rabin (1922–1995)	1 January 1964	1 January 1968	4 years, 0 days	
8	Haim Bar-Lev	Haim Bar-Lev (1924–1994)	1 January 1968	1 January 1972	4 years, 0 days	
9	David Elazar	David Elazar (1925–1976)	1 January 1972	3 April 1974	2 years, 92 days	
–	Yitzhak Hofi	Yitzhak Hofi (1927–2014); Acting	3 April 1974	16 April 1974	13 days	
10	Mordechai Gur	Mordechai Gur (1930–1995)	16 April 1974	16 April 1978	4 years, 0 days	
11	Rafael Eitan	Rafael Eitan (1929–2004)	16 April 1978	19 April 1983	5 years, 3 days	
12	Moshe Levi	Moshe Levi (1936–2008)	19 April 1983	19 April 1987	4 years, 0 days	
13	Dan Shomron	Dan Shomron (1937–2008)	19 April 1987	1 April 1991	3 years, 347 days	
14	Ehud Barak	Ehud Barak (born 1942)	1 April 1991	1 January 1995	3 years, 275 days	
15	Amnon Lipkin-Shahak	Amnon Lipkin-Shahak (1944–2012)	1 January 1995	9 July 1998	3 years, 189 days	
16	Shaul Mofaz	Shaul Mofaz (born 1948)	9 July 1998	9 July 2002	4 years, 0 days	
17	Moshe Ya'alon	Moshe Ya'alon (born 1950)	9 July 2002	1 June 2005	2 years, 327 days	
18	Dan Halutz	Dan Halutz (born 1948)	1 June 2005	14 February 2007	1 year, 258 days	
19	Gabi Ashkenazi	Gabi Ashkenazi (born 1954)	14 February 2007	14 February 2011	4 years, 0 days	
20	Benny Gantz	Benny Gantz (born 1959)	14 February 2011	16 February 2015	4 years, 2 days	
21	Gadi Eizenkot	Gadi Eizenkot (born 1960)	16 February 2015	15 January 2019	3 years, 333 days	
22	Aviv Kohavi	Aviv Kohavi (born 1964)	15 January 2019	16 January 2023	4 years, 1 day	
23	Herzi Halevi	Herzi Halevi (born 1967)	16 January 2023	5 March 2025	2 years, 48 days	
24	Eyal Zamir	Eyal Zamir (born 1966)	5 March 2025	Incumbent	1 year, 192 days	
