= Operation Badr (1973) =

Egyptian military operation against Israel

- Part of the Yom Kippur War
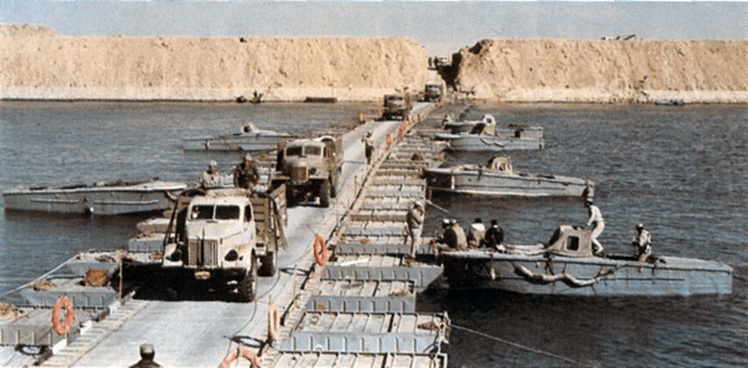
- Egyptian military vehicles crossing the Suez Canal over one of the bridgeheads, 7 October 1973
Date	6–8 October 1973
Location	Sinai Peninsula, Egypt
Result	Egyptian victory
Territorial changes	The Suez Canal comes under Egyptian control; Fall of Israel's Bar-Lev Line

Belligerents
Israel	Egypt

Commanders and leaders
David Elazar; Shmuel Gonen; Albert Mandler; Avraham Adan; Ariel Sharon	Ahmad Ismail Ali; Saad el-Shazly; Saad Mamoun; Abdul Munim Wassel

Strength
6 October: 1 division; 8,000 infantry (460–600 in the Bar-Lev Line); 300–360 tanks; 8 October: 3 divisions; 640 tanks	6 October: 32,000 infantry; 7 October: 200 tanks; 8 October: 5 divisions; 90,000 infantry; 980 tanks

Casualties and losses
950 killed; 2,000 wounded; 400–500 tanks destroyed	280 killed; 20 tanks destroyed

Operation Badr (Arabic: عملية بدر ʻAmaliyat Badr), also known as Plan Badr (خطة بدر Khitat Badr), was an Egyptian military offensive and operation across the Suez Canal that destroyed the Bar-Lev Line, a chain of Israeli fortifications along the frontline of the Israeli-occupied Sinai Peninsula, on 6 October 1973. It was launched in conjunction with a Syrian military offensive against the Israeli-occupied Golan Heights, triggering the Yom Kippur War. During the War of Attrition, which preceded Operation Badr, both Egypt and Syria (previously constituents of the United Arab Republic) had been seeking to recover the territories that Israel had captured from them during the 1967 Arab–Israeli War.

The Egyptians had begun preparing for the offensive with training exercises in 1968, followed by operational planning from 1971 onward, including a deceptive operation. In the opening stages of the attack, known as "the crossing" (العبور al-'obour), Egyptian combat engineers utilized water cannons to rapidly clear numerous passages through the sand wall lining the eastern bank of the Suez Canal, simultaneously laying bridges and operating ferries that allowed armoured vehicles to cross into Israeli-controlled territory.

Israel's military was surprised by the scale of the attack, and by 7 October, the Egyptians had completed their crossing; the Israelis' eastern bank was captured and occupied by five Egyptian infantry divisions, which subsequently established defensive positions on bridgeheads spanning the 160-kilometre (99 mi) frontline. Following a lull in the fighting on 7 October, Israeli armour reserves arrived at the Suez Canal and launched a counterattack against the Egyptians opposite to the city of Ismailia. However, Egypt's military was successful in employing anti-tank weapons to repel the Israeli assault and advanced once more. By the end of 8 October, Egypt had occupied a strip of territory along the entire eastern bank of the Suez Canal to a depth of approximately 15 kilometres (9.3 mi).

In addition to the crossing, Egypt had successfully implemented a naval blockade against Israel in the Red Sea and the Mediterranean Sea. Though Israel ultimately was able to halt the Egyptian advance and begin a counterattack in the southern Suez Canal, the sweeping success of Egyptian troops in the initial stages of the conflict, including Operation Badr, is specially commemorated by the 6th of October Panorama in Egypt's Cairo and by the October War Panorama in Syria's Damascus. In Cairo, the 6th of October Bridge is named for the date on which Operation Badr commenced.

== Prelude: 1967–1970 ==
=== Israeli occupation of the Sinai Peninsula ===
At the end of the Six-Day War, Israel held the entire Sinai Peninsula, with the exception of Port Fouad. Israel's victory in the Six-Day War brought about a sense of security within Israel; the occupied territory added strategic depth to the country's defense. Consequently, Israel and Egypt ignored United Nations Security Council Resolution (UNSCR) 242, which called for withdrawal from occupied territories in return for Arab recognition, and negotiations between the countries ceased. Israeli Prime Minister Golda Meir aimed to maintain the status quo and believed that her country's military strength would secure peace with Arab nations on their terms. Egypt, following the "three nos" policy, refused to recognize Israel or even negotiate with Israel directly, preferring talks via third parties.

=== Soviet aid for Egypt's military ===
The 1967 war had severely depleted Egypt's military strength, as most of their air force and a large quantity of equipment was destroyed. Soviet assistance helped the Egyptian military to start the rebuilding of their armed forces shortly after the war, and by September 1968, Egyptian ground forces had sufficiently recovered to challenge the Israeli presence east of the Suez canal. The War of Attrition began with Egyptian artillery barrages and commando raids into the Sinai, which were countered by deep-striking Israeli airstrikes and heli-borne raids into Egypt. Egypt's inability to challenge Israeli air superiority led to the deployment of Soviet-operated air-defense assets to protect parts of Egypt's interior, deterring the Israelis from launching their deep penetration raids and allowing the Egyptians to rebuild their air defenses. The defensive upgrades incurred increasing Israeli air losses, leading to an August 1970 ceasefire that lasted until 1973. Nasser died in September 1970 and was succeeded by Anwar Sadat.

== Egyptian strategy ==
=== Exploiting the Cold War détente ===
President Sadat believed that Egypt's economic, political, social and military problems were a result of the Six-Day War. He believed the solution to these problems lay with erasing the humiliation of the 1967 defeat, which required regaining the Sinai. In 1971, Sadat began the coordinated political and military groundwork to achieve this. In February, he proposed a phased Israel withdrawal from the Sinai, which would involve a reopening of the Suez Canal, and Israeli fulfillment of the UNSCR 242, including resolving the Palestinian refugee problem. In return, Egypt would sign a peace treaty with Israel and re-establish relations with the United States. However, Israeli insistence on retention of territory necessary for its security ended diplomatic efforts.

Simultaneously, Sadat sought to improve Egypt's military capabilities, and in March began the first of four trips to the Soviet Union to obtain arms and munitions to cover those expended in the War of Attrition. He publicly stated his desire to go to war and marked 1971 the "year of decision". However, the Soviets failed to deliver the promised supplies, and Sadat ruled out an offensive that year. As 1971 drew to a close, Sadat's threats were dismissed as hollow Arab rhetoric. Added to their already weak political position, Arab leaders reached a consensus in 1972 that a diplomatic solution to the conflict was hopeless. American mediation steadily declined, ceasing entirely by mid-1973.

By 1972, the United States and the Soviet Union were focused on détente. The Arabs were worried, as it meant their military situation in regards to Israel would remain at a disadvantage. Believing diplomatic avenues had reached a dead end, Sadat focused on taking decisive military action. A renewed conflict with Israel would disrupt Soviet-American détente, force superpower intervention and make the solution of the Arab-Israeli conflict a center-stage issue to Israel, the US and the USSR.

A number of Egyptian commanders wanted to carry out a general war to regain at least a significant part of the Sinai. This view was notably held by the Minister of War, General Mohammed Ahmed Sadek. However, in January 1972 Sadek acknowledged that Egypt's Armed Forces were not ready for a land reclamation war before some five to ten years. Sadek cited studies in opposition of a limited offensive; Egyptian analyses estimated 17,000 casualties in a canal crossing, while Soviet estimates placed casualty figures at 35,000 troops. Sadek stressed the immense losses that would be sustained would overshadow any military and political gains from a limited offensive, which required following up by liberating all or most of the Sinai.

For political reasons, Sadat dismissed Sadek's arguments. The government's political position was perilous as the Egyptian public, angered by the "No War, No Peace" situation with Israel, demanded action. The economy, already suffering from the loss of the Suez Canal revenues and the Sinai oil fields, could not cope with the country being on a war footing for an extended period. War was a desperate option, and a limited offensive under the current circumstances was the only solution.

=== Assistance from the Arab League ===
At a session of the Arab League's Joint Defence Council on 27–30 January 1973, Egypt presented a report stressing that an attack against Israel would have to be carried out simultaneously from Egypt, Syria and Jordan because of the Israeli air superiority. According to the report, Egypt and Syria's air forces, if reinforced with 16 air squadrons from other Arab countries would achieve numerical superiority. However, the Israelis offset this by superior training, avionics, aircraft payload and weaponry. A simultaneous Arab attack could dilute the effectiveness of the Israeli Air Force (IAF), and would force Israeli ground forces to fight a two-front war.

==== Egyptian–Syrian offensive ====
During that month, Syrian President Hafez al-Assad indicated his intentions of going to war against Israel. Egypt and Syria agreed to coordinate military action via negotiations, and the respective Ministers of War formulated a common military strategy. Egypt enlisted the political support of several more Arab countries, some producers of oil. Sadat discussed the possibility of using oil as an economic weapon to pressure Western governments into adopting more pro-Arab policies. During the war, oil-producing Arab nations, primarily Libya and Saudi Arabia, initiated an oil embargo, and several sent token forces to the front lines.

Sadat bred caution into his commanders, even warning his later Minister of War, Ahmed Ismail Ali, "not to lose the army as had happened in 1967." On 3 June 1971 he outlined his vision of a limited war:

I want us to plan [the offensive] within our capabilities, nothing more. Cross the canal and hold even ten centimeters of the Sinai. I'm exaggerating, of course, but that will help me greatly and alter completely the political situation internationally and within Arab ranks.

Sadat's strategy was designed to achieve political success without needing a comprehensive military victory, and hence, and in view of the Egyptian military's marked inferiority to the Israel Defense Forces, this required only a limited war.

A limited operation was supported by Egyptian armed forces Chief of Staff Saad El Shazly. He argued that Israel has two fatal weaknesses. The first of which is inability to sustain high human casualties due to limited available manpower. The second is inability to sustain a prolonged war for it mobilizes around 18% of the Jewish population. A prolonged limited defensive war can best capitalize both weaknesses.

== Background ==
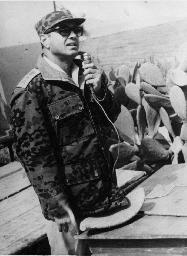
Lt. Gen. Saad El Shazly was responsible for planning a crossing offensive

=== Planning and preparations ===
Major General Mohammed Fawzi, who was Sadek's predecessor as defense minister, regularly held command simulations. These exercises had unrealistic objectives and operational aims that were considerably outside the capabilities of the Egyptian military. When Lieutenant General Saad El Shazly became Chief of Staff on 16 May 1971, no offensive plans yet existed. Rather, there was a defensive plan code named Operation 200, and a more aggressive alternative named Operation Granite. Although Granite incorporated raids and assaults into the Sinai, it was essentially defensive. In his assessment of the military's capabilities, he concluded the air force was the weakest arm. It was outmatched by its Israeli counterpart in various aspects, and Israeli pilots were also more experienced. A pivotal equipment advantage for the IAF was the F-4 Phantom II, a third generation fighter/bomber. By the outbreak of the war in October 1973, the IDF had 122 F-4Es and 6 RF-4Es (R denotes the reconnaissance variant) in service.

To compensate for the weaknesses of Egyptian air power, the Egyptians developed their air defenses. They fielded immobile SA-2 and SA-3 SAMs, the backbone of the air defenses, as well as mobile SA-6 SAMs and ZSU-23-4 SPAAGs (Self Propelled Anti-Air Gun), portable infantry SA-7s, in addition to thousands of conventional anti-air artillery. These air defenses would provide a protective "umbrella" over Egyptian ground forces. However, the SA-2 and SA-3 systems, being immobile, could only be moved over a nine-hour period at best, exposing the air defenses to degradation in case of a redeployment to keep up with advancing forces. On the other hand, the SA-6 systems were available in limited numbers insufficient to provide adequate protection to advancing armored forces.

Due to these restrictions, Shazly supported a limited war to retake only the east bank of the canal, as opposed to Sadek. However, Sadek authorized the planning of two offensive plans, starting in July 1971. The first was Operation 41, which involved an offensive along the entire Suez Canal with the objective of seizing the key passes of the Sinai. The plan was developed in cooperation with Soviet advisers. As it was, the objectives of the operation were outside the capabilities of the Egyptian military and Shazly saw it only as a means of inducing the Soviets to supply more arms and equipment. The plan would also encourage the Syrians to join in an attack against Israel. Operation 41 was completed by September 1971, and the following month, Sadat and Sadek flew to Moscow to conclude Egypt's largest arms deal yet, receiving 100 MiG-21 fighters, 10 Tu-16 bombers, SA-6 anti-aircraft (AA) missiles and heavy artillery. Operation 41 was renamed Operation Granite Two.

The second plan—codenamed the "High Minarets"—called for a crossing at five separate areas along the length of the canal. The Egyptians would advance 10–15 kilometers (6.2–9.3 mi), then establish defensive positions. By restricting their advance, Egyptian ground forces would remain within range of their own SAM defences, which would provide a protective "umbrella", negating the Israeli advantage in the air. In this way the High Minarets was planned in accordance with the capabilities of the Egyptian Army. The plan's outline was completed by September 1971 in absolute secrecy.

As Sadek continued to refuse the concept of a limited war, tensions rose between him and Sadat. Following a heated meeting of senior commanders, the Minister of War was sacked. His replacement, Major General Ahmed Ismail, was in favor of a limited offensive. The High Minarets continued to be developed as the only viable offensive plan, with the spring of 1973 being a possible launch date. Based on intelligence estimates, the main Israeli counterattacks would take place 6–8 hours after the assault began by three armored divisions, while armored support for the crossing would not be available before at least 12 hours. To deal with this, Egyptian infantry would be supplied with large numbers of anti-tank guided missiles (ATGM) and rocket propelled grenades (RPG). The portable anti-tank weapons were principally the RPG-7 and the less numerous wire-guided AT-3 Sagger, as well as hundreds of recoilless rifles and conventional weapons. The manually guided Sagger missile had a long range and a powerful warhead but suffered from low velocity in flight, allowing the target (such as a tank) time to take evasive maneuver or return fire. Its minimum range of 500–800 meters (1,600–2,600 ft) created a significant area of dead ground, which was to be covered by the RPG, along with the B-10 and B-11 recoilless rifles. In addition, there were RPG-43 anti-tank grenades. Assault infantry were equipped with night vision devices, infrared scopes, and welder's goggles to counter a tactic often used by the Israelis; mounting xenon floodlights on tanks and vehicles to blind enemy infantry at night. To allow the infantry to carry an assortment of heavy weaponry—ATGMs, RPGs, flamethrowers, machine guns, and mines—before the bridges were laid, was achieved by two steps. Firstly, five different field kits were created that were lighter, accommodated larger water bottles and could carry 24 hours' food supply. Each field kit was specifically designed to meet the needs of the various assault teams. The other solution was to use four-wheel wooden carts to transport equipment, weaponry and ammunition. Over 2,200 such carts would be used in the crossing, providing the capacity to transport nearly 330 tons (150,000 lb) of matériel. Rope ladders with wooden steps would be deployed to lift ammunition and heavy equipment, such as the B-11 recoilless rifle, to the top of the sand wall.

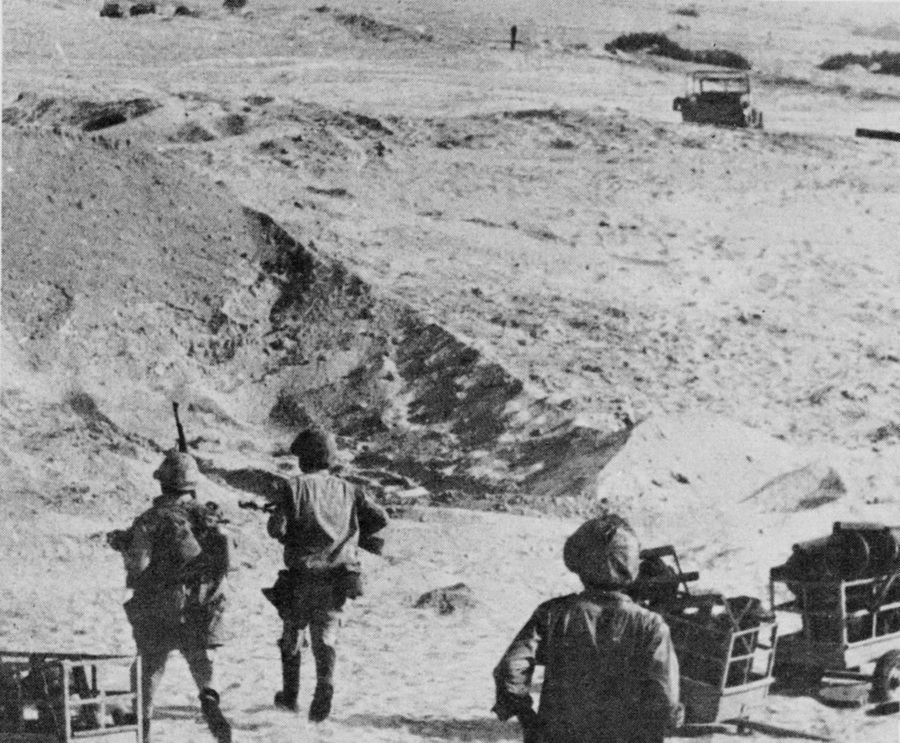
Egyptian soldiers on the east bank. Notice the carts. Pulled by two men, these transports greatly assisted in the movement of weapons and matériel on the east bank, while no vehicles had yet crossed.

The High Minarets called for assault infantry to establish bridgeheads 5 kilometers (3.1 mi) deep and 8 kilometers (5.0 mi) wide. The relatively short perimeter would increase fire density, and initially the attack would receive supporting fire from sand ramparts on the western bank. Once reinforcements and armor crossed, the bridgeheads would be deepened to 8 kilometers (5.0 mi). This had to be accomplished within 18 hours of the start of the operation. Airborne and seaborne forces would conduct attacks and ambushes to delay Israeli reserves heading for the Bar Lev line.

The spring of 1973 passed with no offensive being launched. On 21 August, in complete secrecy, six senior Syrian commanders, using false names and passports, arrived from Latakia at Alexandria harbor in a Soviet passenger liner carrying holiday makers. Among the Syrian commanders were, principally, the Minister of Defense General Mustafa Tlass and the Chief of Staff General Yusuf Shakkour. For the next two days, they convened with their Egyptian counterparts at Egyptian Naval Headquarters in Ras El Tin Palace. By 23 August, two documents were ratified by Shazly and Shakkour concluding that the Egyptian and Syrian armed forces were ready for war. All that remained was to choose a date; either 7–11 September or 5–10 October. The date was to be chosen jointly by Presidents Sadat and Hafez al-Assad, and they were required to communicate their decision to their commanders fifteen days before the date of attack.

When 27 August, fifteen days before 7 September, passed without a reply from either Sadat or Assad, it was clear no offensive would take place in September. During 28 and 29 August, Sadat met with Assad in Damascus, where they agreed to start the war in October. They specified 6 October as D-Day, and informed Ahmed Ismail and Tlass on 22 September, who in turn relayed the decision to the Chiefs of Staff. At the request of Ahmed Ismail, Sadat produced a presidential directive for war. Therefore, it was only in September, less than a month before the attack, that the date 6 October was finally selected as D-Day. The coordinated offensive would begin at 14:00 (Cairo Local Time). 6 October was chosen for several reasons. The speed of the water current and the tide were optimal for a crossing operation, and for most of the night there was a full moon, facilitating bridge construction. The date coincided with Yom Kippur, the Jewish Day of Atonement. This was an important factor in choosing 6 October for an attack; observant Jews fast on that day, abstain from the use of fire or electricity (which meant transportation would be at a standstill), and much of the Israeli army would be demobilised. October also coincided with the month of Ramadan in the Muslim Calendar, which meant that Muslim soldiers would be fasting. It was in Ramadan that the Muslims won their first victory at the Battle of Badr in the year 624. Opting for something more inspirational than the High Minarets as a name, Operation Badr was chosen by Egyptian commanders as the codename for the assault.

=== Combat engineering ===
In any crossing of the Suez Canal by Egyptian forces, success was highly dependent on the performance of the Egyptian Corps of Engineers, which had several daunting tasks to accomplish. Israeli engineers had constructed a massive artificial sand barrier spanning 160 kilometers (99 mi) of the canal's east bank (except for the Great Bitter Lake, where the width of the canal made a crossing unlikely). To prevent erosion, the sand barrier was supported by concrete, which was one metre (3⅓ ft) above the water at high tide, and three metres (10 ft) above water at low tide. The canal was 180–220 meters (590–720 ft) wide and approximately 18 meters (59 ft) deep. Engineers had to clear seventy passages through this sand wall, each 7 m (23 ft) wide. This meant the removal of 1,500 cubic meters (2,000 yd^{3}) of sand for each passage. Initially, conventional methods were tested for breaching the sand wall. It was found that, to clear a single passage required 60 men, 1 bulldozer, 300 kg (600 lb) of explosives and five to six hours, uninterrupted by enemy fire. Since the crossing sites would likely be congested and under enemy fire, these methods proved to be impractical and too costly.

The solution to this dilemma was simple but nonetheless ingenious. Late in 1971, an Egyptian officer suggested the use of small, light, gasoline fueled pumps that could be ferried across the canal in inflatable rafts to blast through the sand barrier by hydraulic mining. The suggestion proved worthwhile, and the Egyptian Military ordered some 300 British-made pumps. Tests showed that five of these pumps could remove 1,500 cubic metres of sand in three hours. In 1972 another 150 more powerful German-made pumps were purchased. A combination of three British-made and two German-made pumps made it possible to clear a passage in two hours.

Once the passages were cleared, engineers had to construct ten heavy bridges (using MTU bridgelayers, TMM bridgelayers and pontoon bridges), five light bridges, ten pontoon bridges and 35 ferries. The passages had to be opened in five to seven hours, immediately followed by the ferries, then the bridges two hours later, all the while under enemy fire. Of the heavy bridges, the Egyptians had only two Soviet-made PMP heavy folding bridges, which could be erected in a shorter time than most other bridges in their inventory, saving a few critical hours. These bridges were also much easier to repair. The speed with which the engineers cleared the passages and laid the bridges and ferries would affect the course of the entire operation. Engineers also had to man the boats that would cross the assault infantry initially. Finally, they had to breach the minefields around Israeli defenses for the assault infantry.

=== Israeli defensive measures ===
The Israelis had constructed a series of fortifications along the canal called the Bar Lev Line, which was considered impregnable. The main obstacle of these defences was a massive artificial sand wall erected by Israeli engineers, 18–25 meters (59–82 ft) high with a 45–60 degree incline, along the entire Suez Canal. The rampart were reinforced by concrete that also prevented any attempt by amphibious vehicles to climb the sand wall. To blast through the sand barrier the Israelis estimated would take at least twenty-four, probably forty-eight hours. Behind this rampart were a series of 22 fortifications comprising 35 strongpoints. On average, the fortifications were 10 kilometers (6.2 mi) apart. A strongpoint was several stories deep into the sand and provided protection from a 1000-pound (~½ ton) bomb. Strongpoints incorporated trenches, barbed wire, minefields 200 meters deep, numerous bunkers and troop shelters, and firing positions for tanks. Each strongpoint had an underground reservoir filled with crude oil. The oil could be pumped into the Suez Canal via a pipe system, and ignited to create temperatures reaching 700 °C (1,292 °F). A second defensive line, 300–500 meters (980–1,640 ft) behind the main line, was concentrated at likely crossing areas, and designed to be occupied by armored forces, incorporating tank firing positions. A third defensive line, 3–5 kilometers (1.9–3.1 mi) behind the sand rampart, had its defences concentrated on the main roads and principal routes of advance for an attacker. Behind the main line on the canal were concentration areas for armor and infantry, supply depots, numerous artillery positions and so forth.

The Israeli command developed a basic defensive plan codenamed Dovecote (Shovach Yonim), the details of which were known to the Egyptians. The plan divided the Bar Lev Line into three sectors: the northern sector defended Arish on the coast to El-Qantarah el-Sharqiyya, the central sector defended Ismailia to Abu-Ageila, and the southern sector defended the area from the Great Bitter Lake to the end of the Suez Canal, and prevented a thrust to the Mitla and Gedy Passes. The 252nd Armored Division, led by Major General Albert Mandler, was charged with the defense of the Bar Lev Line, and incorporated three armored brigades. Positioned 5–9 kilometers (3.1–5.6 mi) behind the series of fortifications was a brigade of 110–120 tanks, led by Colonel Reshef, split into three battalions of 36–40 tanks each, with one battalion to a sector. In case of an Egyptian attack, the brigade was to move forward to occupy tank platforms and firing positions along the Bar Lev Line. A further 20–35 kilometers (12–22 mi) behind the canal were two additional armored brigades led by Colonels Gabi Amir and Dan Shomron, each with around 120 tanks. One brigade was to reinforce the forward armored brigade, while the other brigade counterattacked against the main Egyptian assault.

The Sinai garrison numbered 18,000 men. The overall commander was Shmuel Gonen, who served as head of the Israeli Southern Command. Of the garrison stationed in the Sinai, one infantry brigade occupied the strongpoints on the canal on 6 October, while a further 8,000 could be deployed to the line within 30 minutes to two hours along with the armor.

=== Deception and final days to war ===
Positioning the Second and Third Armies with their bridging equipment along the canal in preparation for Operation Badr would put the Israelis on high alert. Without the element of surprise Egyptian forces would suffer high losses in the attack (estimates for casualties already ran in the thousands). The Directorate of Military Intelligence (abbreviated Aman), which formulated Israel's intelligence estimate and was known for its competency, was tasked with detecting troop movements and activity along Egyptian and Syrian forces; military activity which would be particularly intensive in the last days preceding the assault.

The deception plan mounted by the Egyptians, which included their intelligence services, relied on producing a series of events and incidents, militarily and politically, internationally and nationally, aimed at convincing Israeli intelligence analysts that the Arab world was not preparing for war. Among the plan's requirements was that senior echelon commanders preserve superficial normality while working secretly on the final preparations for the offensive.

The core of the Egyptian deception plan was based on the prevalent Israeli mentality following their lightning-quick victory over Arab forces in the 1967 Six-Day War. This mentality is clearly illustrated in the following Israeli saying:

Damascus is only one hour's drive away, and Cairo perhaps two.

In his thesis of the Yom Kippur War, USMC Major Michael C. Jordan explains that this quote and the prevailing opinion it represented pre-October 1973:

... also reflects the contempt Israelis held for the military abilities of Arab neighbors Egypt and Syria. The 1967 preemptive victory was so complete and won so cheaply, Israelis viewed their military forces as invincible, their intelligence service as unmatched, and their Arab foes as inferior and incapable.

The Israelis expected a forty-eight-hour warning beforehand from their intelligence services. At any rate, they were confident that any Arab attack would be swiftly decimated by the IAF.

The Egyptians sought to exploit this Israeli belief to their advantage. Ever since assuming office, Sadat had continually threatened Israel with war, engaging in brinkmanship, until his threats became ignored by Israel and the world. In order to position their forces for the attack against Israel, the Egyptians announced an exercise by the canal. Exercises had been conducted numerous times before, and in May and August 1973 false alarms had caused the Israeli army to mobilise in response to these exercises, costing Israel some $10 million on each occasion. This time, when the Egyptians began exercises on 1 October to last until 7 October, Aman disregarded the heightened military activity as training maneuvers. Troop movements on the Syrian front were detected as well, but Aman concluded that the Syrians would not go to war without the Egyptians.

The pretext of exercises allowed the Egyptians to conceal their preparations. These were further facilitated by the fact that the Egyptian Second and Third Field Armies were normally stationed along the Suez Canal for defence. Troops, armor, and crucially, the bridging equipment, were moved to their concentration areas over a period of fifteen nights up to the night of 5/6 October, with a peak of activity during the final five nights.

Ever since it occupied the Sinai in 1967, Israel had openly declared it would remain in Sharm el-Sheikh to ensure the sea lanes to the port of Eilat through the Straits of Tiran remained opened (the closing of the Straits to Israeli shipping in 1967 was one of the causes of the Six-Day War). Egypt aimed to nullify Sharm el-Sheikh's importance to Israel by imposing a naval blockade at the straits of Bab-el-Mandeb, almost 2,500 kilometers (1,600 mi) from Israel. To this end, arrangements were made with Pakistan to receive Egyptian vessels for repair early in 1973. Approval was sought, and obtained, from Sudan and Yemen to receive the submarines on their way to Pakistan in Port Sudan and Aden as a friendly visit. Pakistan's approval to receive Egyptian vessels for repairs were made public. On 1 October, a force containing several submarines, destroyers and missile boats set sail on a route planned to ensure their arrival at Bab-el-Mandeb on 6 October. The fleet was fully equipped for combat, and the force was ordered to maintain complete radio silence; which meant there was no way of recalling the submarines. The commanding officers, unaware of their real mission, were issued sealed envelopes detailing their orders and mission, and were instructed to open the envelopes on 6 October, only a few hours before the war was to begin, whereupon they would break their radio silence. Once the fleet had set sail that day, 1 October, "the war had effectively begun".

The military sought to maintain an impression of normality. Just before Ramadan was to begin on 26 September, the Ministry of War publicly announced that military personnel could register to take leave to perform a Umrah (pilgrimage) in Mecca. Egyptian newspapers announced that sailboat races would be held, participants of which included several high-ranking officers of the Egyptian Navy. In addition, a visit planned for 8 October (two days after the scheduled attack) by the Romanian Minister of Defense to Egypt was also publicized by the Ministry of War, and a program for his visit was announced. This coincidental visit would be promptly canceled once war broke out on 6 October, but it proved useful as part of the deception plan.

On 27 September, a large batch of reservists were given orders for mobilization. To lull suspicion, the Cabinet Ministers of the Egyptian Government were invited to an open tour of General Headquarters, where all planning and coordination of the operation took place. Another batch of reservists were called up on 30 September. To quell suspicion once more, the Egyptians publicly announced on 4 October the demobilization of the reservists who had been called up on 27 September, but only demobilized 20,000 men.

From 1 October onwards, the order for war began to spread outside the circle of senior commanders in Egypt. Generals Saad Mamoun and Abdel Munim Wasel, commanders of the Second and Third Field Armies respectively, were informed of the decision to implement Operation Badr. On 3 October, they informed their divisional commanders. Brigade commanders were told on 4 October, battalion and company commanders on 5 October, while platoon commanders and troops were told on 6 October, six hours before the start of the attack.

Sadat also played his role the deception plan; in September he had attended the Non-Aligned conference in Algeria, and upon his return was rumored to be ill. Sadat remained, for several days leading up to 6 October, out of public sight. Egyptian intelligence planted false stories of his illness in the press and initiated a search for a home in Europe, where Sadat would receive treatment, adding to the rumor's credibility.

Implementing the deception operation did not go through entirely without incident. Initially the Soviets were kept in the dark about Egyptian intentions to go to war. Instead, on 2 October, they were told that an Israeli raid was expected. Over the next two days the director of the Defense Intelligence Service, General Fouad Nassar, informed the Chief Soviet Liaison Officer, General Samakhodsky, that the raid was expected to be a large-scale attack, coupled with an air strike. Though Samakhodsky appeared at first to believe Nassar's story, it became clear to the Egyptians that the Soviets were suspicious. In particular Soviet advisors serving with Egyptian and Syrian units were by 3 October reporting the unusually heightened activities of the Egyptian and Syrian forces. Both Sadat and Assad decided to inform the Soviets of their intention to go to war on 3 October. Promptly, the Soviets requested permission to evacuate their personnel in Egypt, and both leaders reluctantly agreed. Egyptian commanders were taken completely by surprise, when, beginning late evening on 4 October, Soviet experts serving with field units, embassy personnel and their families were hurriedly evacuated. By 5 October, the evacuation was complete. This incident would be an important factor in convincing the Israelis that war was likely.

4 October also provided another worrying incident to Egyptian commanders, who became aware that evening that EgyptAir, the country's national airline, had canceled all its flights and was arranging the protection of its civil air fleet by dispersing its aircraft to refuges outside Egypt. The orders came from the Minister of Aviation, Ahmed Nuh. General Headquarters quickly intervened to reverse the dispersal orders, and by 5 October flights were back to their normal schedule. It was believed the incident was a breach of security and a leak on Egyptian plans for war. It was not clear to Egyptian commanders however, whether the Israelis were aware of the incident.

On 13 September 1973, an air battle took place between Syrian and Israeli fighters. It was an alarming skirmish in which twelve Syrian aircraft were shot down while the Israelis lost only one fighter. Tension ran high between both countries. The Egyptians in particular were very concerned; on 7 April 1967, an air battle between Syria and Israel had escalated the military situation and was one of the causes of the Six-Day War. Aware that war was to be launched only days later, the Syrians chose not to retaliate. The air battle aided the Syrians in concentrating their forces for the war, as the Israelis interpreted it to be a defensive reaction on the part of the Syrians. The Israelis closely monitored this buildup near the front, but their intelligence remained adamant that Syria would not go to war without Egypt, which the Israelis believed was currently occupied with internal issues.

Throughout September 1973, Aman had received eleven warnings, including a warning from Jordan's King Hussein, that Egypt and Syria were bent on waging war, but they were all disregarded, as Aman maintained the belief that the Arabs would not launch an attack. Mossad director Zvi Zamir remained of the opinion that war was not an Arab option.

However, there remained too many signs for the Israelis to ignore, chief among which was the hasty Soviet evacuation from Cairo and Damascus, and the constant buildup of forces on the Syrian front when Egypt, it was assumed, would not enter war. Though the Chief of Staff, David Elazar, was assured that the probability of war remained low, he took precautionary steps on 5 October. Elazar placed the entire military on alert, canceled all leaves, and ordered the Air Force to assume a full-alert posture. He also ordered the 7th Armored Brigade to relocate from the Sinai to the Golan Heights. This raised Israeli numbers in the Golan Heights to 177 tanks and 44 artillery pieces on 6 October. To replace the 7th Armored Brigade, the Armor School, under the command of Colonel Gabi Amir, was ordered to activate its tank brigade for immediate airlift; it was in the Sinai by 6 October, before the war began. Ultimately though, no orders for mobilization were issued to reservists; Elazar and other senior commanders still expected a 24- to 48-hour warning from the intelligence services if the Arab nations were bent on war.

During the night of 5/6 October, Zvi Zamir went to Europe to meet personally with Ashraf Marwan, an Egyptian double agent working for Mossad. Marwan informed Zamir that a joint Egyptian-Syrian attack was imminent. Combined with other warnings and incidents, Marwan's warning finally convinced Zvi Zamir of the imminence of war. Eli Zeira, the director of Aman, sent a definite warning of war to the Israeli leadership at 04:30 on 6 October. Aman erred when it concluded the Arabs were to attack at 18:00, an estimation in fact four hours late. Israel's Prime Minister Golda Meir met with Defence Minister Moshe Dayan and General David Elazar at 08:05 for over an hour. Meir asked both men to present their views, which were conflicting: Dayan continued to believe war was not a certainty, while Elazar believed otherwise, arguing for a preemptive air strike against Syria. Dayan also proposed a partial mobilization of reserves, while Elazar favored a mobilization of the entire Air Force, and four armored divisions, totaling around 100,000–120,000 troops. Meir concluded the meeting by stating that no preemptive strike would be launched, in order to ensure the backing of the United States, but she sided with Elazar on the issue of mobilization, and orders were issued to reservists to mobilize.

Aman delivered its warning to Israeli commanders just nine and a half hours before the outbreak of hostilities, falling considerably short of the expected 24 to 48 hour warning period. The Arabs had won the intelligence war, achieving full surprise and gaining the initiative on the battlefield.

== Course of the operation ==
=== 6 October ===
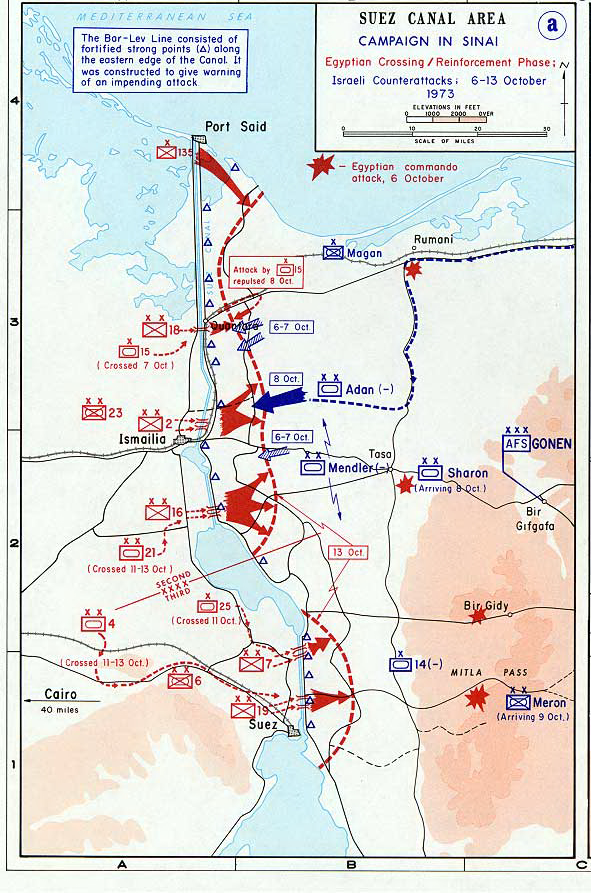
The Egyptian Offensive on 6 October and Israeli counterattacks

Badr began at 14:00 on 6 October 1973. As the Israelis expected the attack to begin four hours later, only part of the troops and none of the armor assigned to man the Bar Lev Line were in position, except for a few platoons in the northernmost forts. Sixteen fortifications on the line were fully manned, and another two were partially manned.

The operation began with a major air strike involving more than 200 aircraft against three airbases, Hawk SAM batteries, three command centers, artillery positions and several radar stations, employing MiG-21s, MiG-17s, and Su-7s. This was in concert with artillery strikes starting at 14:05 from nearly 2,000 pieces against the Bar-Lev line, and against armor concentration areas and artillery positions, using field guns, howitzers, mortars, tank guns, B-10 and B-11 recoilless rifles. The self-propelled 152 mm howitzers and 130 mm field guns were assigned counter-battery fire missions against Israeli artillery. The 53-minute-long fire preparation, one of the largest in history, was divided into four barrages. The first, fifteen minutes long, was aimed at enemy targets on the eastern bank up to a depth of 1.5 kilometers. An estimated 10,500 shells were fired against Israeli targets in the first minute alone.

With the start of the fire preparation, tank hunting detachments—groups of ten equipped with RPG-7 rockets, RPG-43 grenades, and AT-3 Sagger missiles—crossed the canal to deploy one kilometer deep, quickly occupying the tank ramparts, and proceeded to set up ambushes and lay mines. When the first barrage ended, Egyptian artillery began a second, 22 minute-long barrage, against targets at a depth of 1.5–3 kilometers. At this time, 14:20, the first wave of assault infantry, 4,000 men, began crossing the canal. Around 2,500 dinghies and wooden boats were used to transport the troops. Smoke canisters were used at the crossing points to provide cover. During the night of 5 October, engineers had blocked the underwater pipes on the opposite bank, preventing the Israelis from releasing flammable oil into the canal and igniting it. The first wave was lightly equipped, armed with RPG-7s, Strela 2 AA missiles and rope ladders to deploy on the sand wall. Among the first wave were combat engineers and several units of Sa'iqa (lightning; these were commando forces), who were tasked with setting up ambushes on reinforcement routes. The Sa'iqa attacked command posts and artillery batteries in order to deny the Israelis control over their forces, while the engineers breached the minefields and barbed wire surrounding Israeli defenses. Immediately following them, military engineers transported the water pumps to the opposite bank and began setting them up. At this time Egyptian aircraft involved in the air strike began returning. Five aircraft were lost, although by the end of the day this rose to ten. The air strike put the Bir Gifgafa and Bir Thamada air bases out of operation for 48 hours, and damaged the Ras Nasrani and Bir Hasanah airbases. Around ten HAWK batteries, at least two 175mm artillery batteries, an electronic jamming center at Umm Khashib, and various radar stations were destroyed. This allowed the Egyptian Air Force to operate for the rest of the war without any ground-based communications interference, as the only other jamming center in the Sinai was located at el-Arish, considerably behind the front. Over a dozen AS-5 Kelt missiles were fired from Tu-16 bombers as well. Several were shot down, but at least five hit their targets, including two missiles fitted with anti-radiation seekers that knocked out Israeli radars. The success of the air strike caused the Egyptians to cancel a planned second air strike. Another account however states that 18 Egyptian aircraft were lost, and these losses prompted the canceling of a second wave of airstrikes.

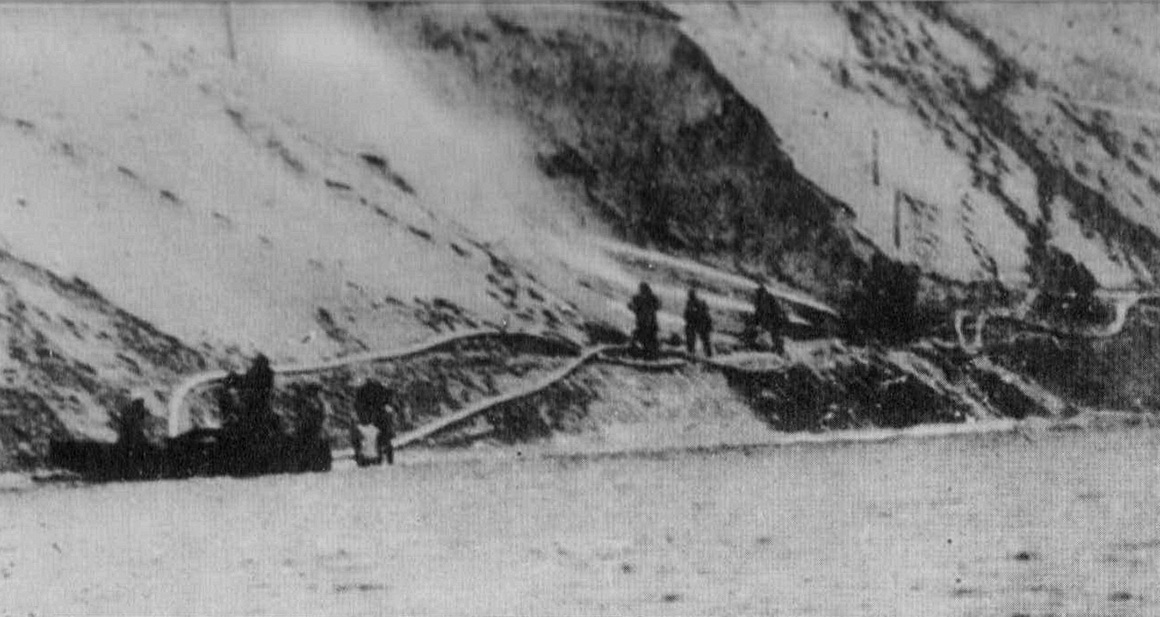
Egyptian engineers employ water cannons to blast an opening in the massive Israeli sand wall.

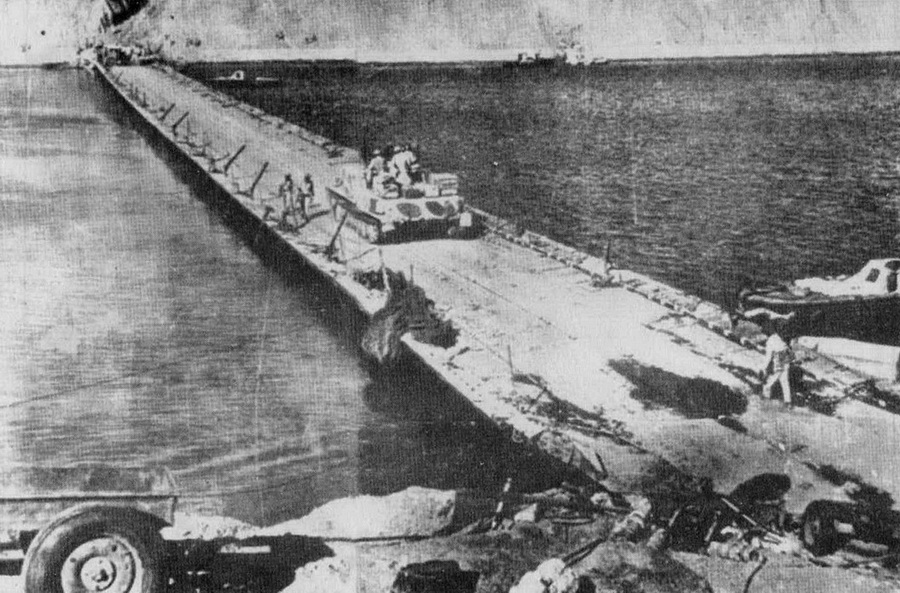
An Egyptian armored vehicle crosses the canal over one of the bridges, 7 October.

At the Great Bitter Lake, the Egyptian 130th Amphibious Brigade performed its own crossing. Composed of the 602nd and 603rd Mechanized Infantry Battalions with 1,000 men, including a Sagger anti-tank battalion, an anti-air battalion, 20 PT-76 tanks and 100 amphibious armored personnel carriers, it was tasked with seeking and destroying enemy installations at the entrances of the Gedy and Mitla Passes. The sand rampart that lined the entire Suez Canal did not exist in the Bitter Lakes, and there were no Israeli defences or units to be encountered, and the brigade reached the opposite bank around 14:40 without any losses. The Egyptians discovered a minefield blocking their advance, and military engineers worked to clear a path.

Subsequently, at around 16:00, the 603rd was regrouping outside the minefield when it was attacked by a company of tanks from Kibrit East (codenamed Putzer by the Israelis), a fortification of the Bar Lev located on the Bitter Lake. The battalion had been reinforced with a tank hunting detachment from the 7th Division, and managed to destroy two tanks and three armored vehicles before the Israelis withdrew. Afterwards, its original assignment was canceled and it was ordered to capture the Kibrit East position (Fort Putzer). It occupied the abandoned position on 9 October which the battalion—despite being cut off and coming under numerous attacks—held for the remainder of the war. As for the 602nd battalion, it began to move eastwards some time after dusk, and stumbled upon an Israeli battalion of 35 tanks along Artillery Road, some 15 kilometers (9.3 mi) from the Bitter Lake. The battalion's ten PT-76s with 76 mm guns were outmatched and outnumbered by the heavier Israeli M48 Pattons with 105 mm guns. The manually guided Saggers were difficult to operate at night, and Israeli tanks were employing blinding xenon floodlights. Caught in the open Sinai desert, the 602nd was defeated and lost many of its tanks and armored vehicles, along with significant casualties. The remaining troops retreated to Third Army lines. Some units may have reached their objectives, although this is disputed. (Note: In his memoirs, Shazly claims that the amphibious brigade managed to strike targets in the Gedy and Mitla passes and raided the Bir Thamada airbase early morning on 7 October. This account is criticized by Hammad who flatly rejects it as entirely fictitious. Dupuy however, states that two platoons did not receive the order to retreat after the skirmish with Israeli armor, and they proceeded towards the passes. At 10:10 on 7 October they raided the Bir Thamada airbase before withdrawing and rejoining their forces. Hammad, p. 141, Dupuy, p. 416.)

Egyptian troops raised their national flag on the eastern bank of the canal at 14:35. By that time company and battalion-size units of Israeli tanks and infantry began reaching the Bar Lev Line, but were prevented from reaching their positions by Egyptian ambushes. Those tanks that broke through came under fire from the west bank ramparts. At 14:45, a second wave of infantry landed on the opposite bank. Subsequent waves of infantry arrived at fifteen-minute intervals. However, after the fourth wave, fatigue and technical problems with the boats gradually widened the time intervals. The Egyptians abandoned their schedules, giving priority to anti-tank teams and weaponry that could critically affect the battle. Amphibious vehicles were also used to cross equipment. The wooden carts were ferried to the east bank via boats, where they were initially lifted to the top of the sand wall with their loads. However, this method proved clumsy, and the carts were first emptied then lifted, after which they were re-loaded and dragged to troops on the front line. The carts greatly facilitated the supply and transportation of matériel on the east bank.

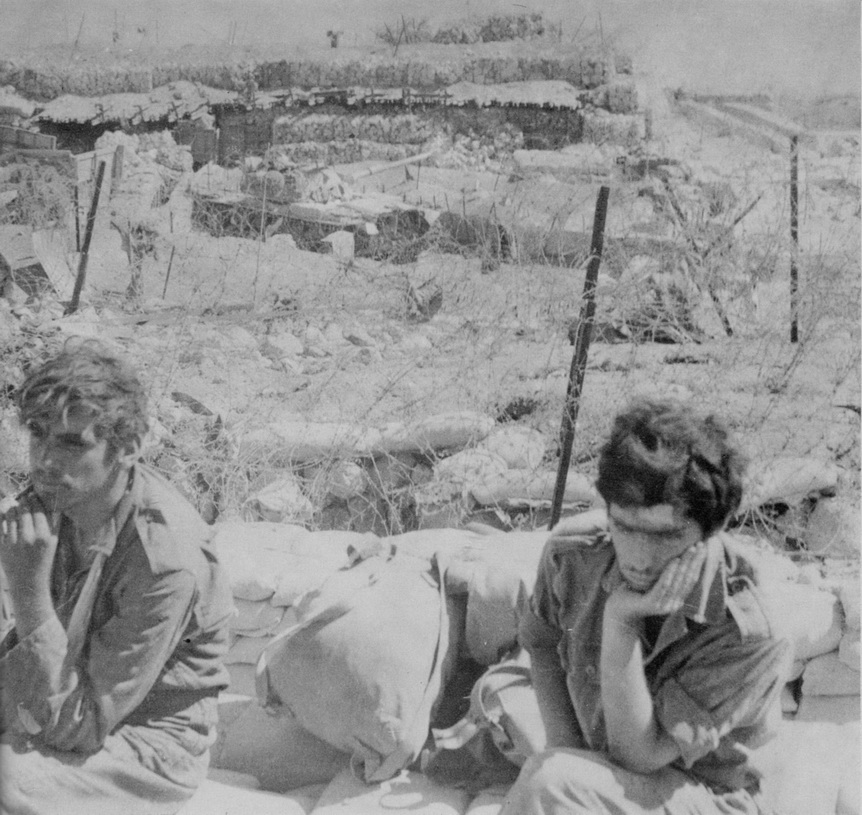
Israeli POWs in one of the Bar Lev forts. In the background is an M60 tank.

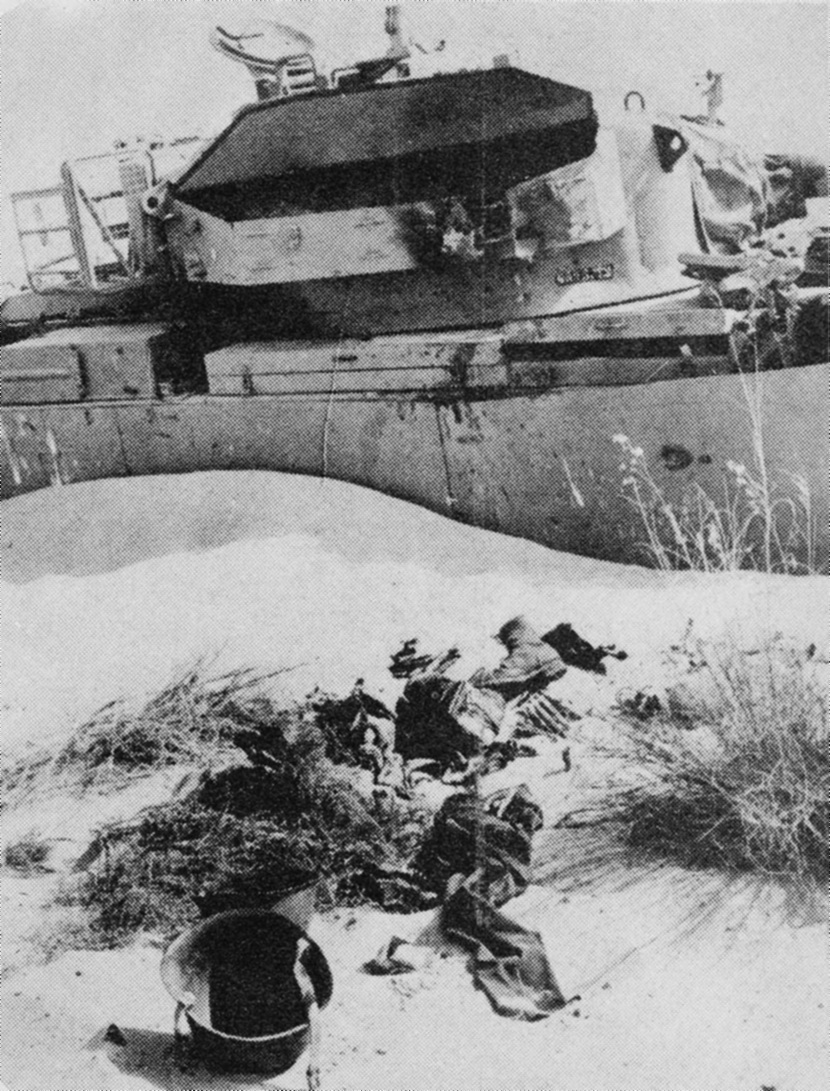
A knocked out Israeli Centurion tank lies partly sunken in the sand.

Meanwhile, Israeli Southern Command attempted to pinpoint the main Egyptian effort to launch a counterattack with Dan Shomron's reserve armored brigade, when, in fact, there was no main effort. As a result, Southern Command wasted several critical hours without taking decisive action. Tactical errors also showcased themselves when Reshef moved his tank brigade forward; Israeli commanders neglected to conduct reconnaissance beforehand, causing their units to fall into Egyptian ambushes. In the confusion ensuing the surprise assault, no attempt was made at evacuating the Bar Lev garrison.

At 15:30, Egyptian forces captured Fort Lahtzanit, the first fortification of the Bar Lev Line to fall, and by then the infantry had been reinforced with 82mm B-10 and 107mm B-11 rifles. At the same time, engineers began operating their water pumps against the sand wall, opening the first passage in less than an hour, and the Egyptians moved up their bridging units to the canal. By 16:30 eight waves had brought across the canal ten infantry brigades in all five bridgeheads, totaling 23,500 men (around 4,700 at each bridgehead). Each bridgehead was on average six kilometers (3¾ mi) wide and around two kilometers deep. The Egyptians had high-velocity 85mm and 100mm rifled anti-tank guns in action on the east bank by that time.

At 17:30, three hours into the war, the twelfth and final infantry wave crossed, bringing the total in all five bridgeheads to 32,000 men (around 6,400 in each bridgehead). By then Israeli armored losses had reached around 100 tanks. The magnitude of Israeli losses stemmed from their insistence to reach their comrades in the Bar Lev Line, and they repeatedly ran into aggressive ambushes by Egyptian soldiers.

Taking advantage of dusk, at 17:50 four Sa'iqa battalions were airdropped deep into the Sinai by helicopters flying at low altitude. The Sa'iqa were assigned the objective of hampering reserves en route from Israel. The helicopters left the range of friendly SAMs and were not assigned air cover, resulting in a number of them being shot down.

At 18:00 Egyptian armor and anti-tank units on the west bank began moving to the crossing sites. Fifteen minutes later engineers completed the assembly of all 35 ferries and waited for the breaches to be opened. By 18:30 the bridgeheads were nearly five kilometers (3 mi) deep. With Israeli artillery on the Bar Lev Line eliminated, the immobile SA-2 and SA-3 units were moved forward. From 22:30 to 01:30 after midnight, all bridges—eight heavy and four light—were laid, and along with the ferries, began transporting reinforcements to the opposite bank. In the far south of the canal, at 19th Division's sector, the sand turned into mud making it difficult to clear. Consequently, four ferries and three bridges assigned to that division were deployed seven hours behind schedule. Periodically the bridges were relocated to confuse Israeli air strikes targeting them—the Egyptians had opened 60 passages but were operating only 12 bridges, allowing each bridge to be moved to one of five passages. Throughout the night and up to the following morning, tanks and vehicles kept crossing the canal. Military police were responsible for directing this enormous traffic, utilizing color-coded signs.

==== Port Said sector ====
The Port Said Sector was an independent military command in the Egyptian military, unattached to the Second Army. It incorporated Port Said, Port Fouad and their vicinity. The sector contained two infantry brigades. Military operations in this area were directed against three fortifications: Budapest, Orkal and Lahtzanit. As with the rest of the front, the offensive here began with a fire preparation. However, high trajectory weapons were not employed because Egyptian aircraft were flying through the sector's airspace, hence only direct fire guns were used to bombard Israeli positions.

Fort Lahtzanit, 19 kilometers (12 mi) south of Port Fouad, was isolated by Egyptian infantry prior to the attack, preventing Israeli reinforcements from reaching it. At 15:00, the Egyptians breached the minefield and barbed wire surrounding the fort, at which point approximately a company-sized force of Egyptian troops assaulted the defenses. By 15:30, the fort was declared under Egyptian control. The Egyptians proceeded to clear a few bunkers still occupied by Israeli soldiers, some of whom surrendered when they began facing flamethrowers. By 18:00, the Egyptians had cleared the fort completely (see Battle of Fort Lahtzanit).

Fort Orkal, 10 kilometers (6.2 mi) south of Port Fouad, was also isolated prior to an attack. The Egyptians approached by land from Port Fouad, and across the Suez Canal. The attack quickly ground to a halt as the force approaching from the north failed to breach the minefield, leaving the force attacking across the canal pinned down at the sand wall by enemy fire. Subsequently, an infantry company crossed and renewed the attack from the south, seizing several positions. Reinforcements soon allowed more positions to be captured. On 7 October, the remaining defenders made a break-out attempt to join friendly forces, but they were intercepted and either killed or captured.

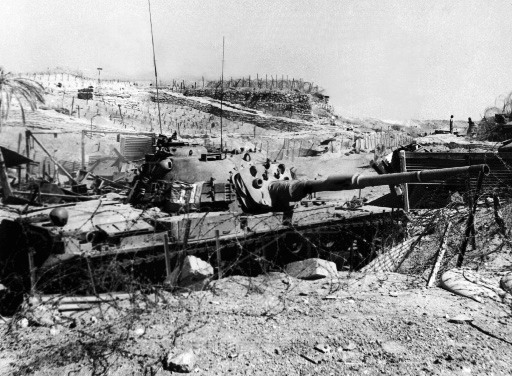
A knocked-out Israeli Magach 3 (M48) tank in one of the Bar Lev stronghold points.

Located on a narrow strip of land southeast of Port Fouad, Fort Budapest was surrounded by water on two sides. The fort came under air and artillery strikes at 14:00. A Sa'iqa company cut off the only route to the fort for reinforcements, while a battalion attacked from Port Fouad, advancing along a narrow strip of land bereft of natural cover. The battalion's attack bogged down at the minefield, which was 600 meters (2,000 ft) deep. It soon came under air attacks, as the fort was outside of the SAM "umbrella", and faced stiff resistance from the fort's garrison. The battalion eventually broke off its attack and retreated, while the Sa'iqa unit east of the fort prevented reinforcements from reaching the fort for four days before it too withdrew. Another attack on 15 October came close to succeeding but ultimately failed, and hence Fort Budapest became the only position of the Bar Lev Line to remain in Israeli hands (see Battles of Fort Budapest).

==== Naval engagements ====
By 6 October the Egyptian naval task force was at Bab-el-Mandeb where they broke radio silence. When Operation Badr began at 14:00, Rear Admiral Fuad Abu Zikry authorized the fleet to proceed with the blockade via a codeword. Egyptian submarines and destroyers intercepted ships traveling through Bab-el-Mandeb destined for Eilat, and all Israeli maritime navigation in the Red Sea ceased. The blockade was a strategic success for Egypt, while the Israeli Navy and Air Force were incapable of lifting the blockade due to the long distance between Israel and Bab-el-Mandeb. Mines were laid at the entrance to the Gulf of Suez to prevent Israel from transporting oil from the Sinai fields to Eilat. Historian Gammal Hammad claims that a blockade was also enforced in the Mediterranean, while other sources dispute this. News of the blockade was censored in Israel.

Aside from the blockade, the Egyptian Navy carried out several other missions. Coastal artillery at Port Said participated in the fire preparation by bombarding Fort Budapest and Fort Orkal, while coastal artillery at Suez hit targets opposite the Third Army. Missile boats bombarded Rumana and Ras Beyron on the Mediterranean, Ras Masala and Ras Sidr on the Gulf of Suez, and Sharm el Sheikh. Naval frogmen raided the oil installations at Bala'eem, disabling the massive driller.

Several naval engagements took place between Egyptian and Israeli missile boats off the coast between Port Said and Damietta, including one on 8 October, when a flotilla of ten Israeli missile boats attempted to shell coastal targets along the Nile Delta. Four Egyptian Osa class missile boats confronted six of them, leading to the Battle of Baltim in which three of the Egyptian missile boats were sunk within forty minutes, with no Israeli casualties. Egypt claimed to have sunk four Israeli "targets", three they believed to be motor torpedo boats and one missile boat.

According to Chaim Herzog, Israel responded with a naval blockade of Egypt which damaged the Egyptian economy. However, the sea routes to Egypt's principal ports—Alexandria on the Mediterranean and Port Safaga on the Red Sea—remained secure and open to shipping for the duration of the war.

=== 7 October ===
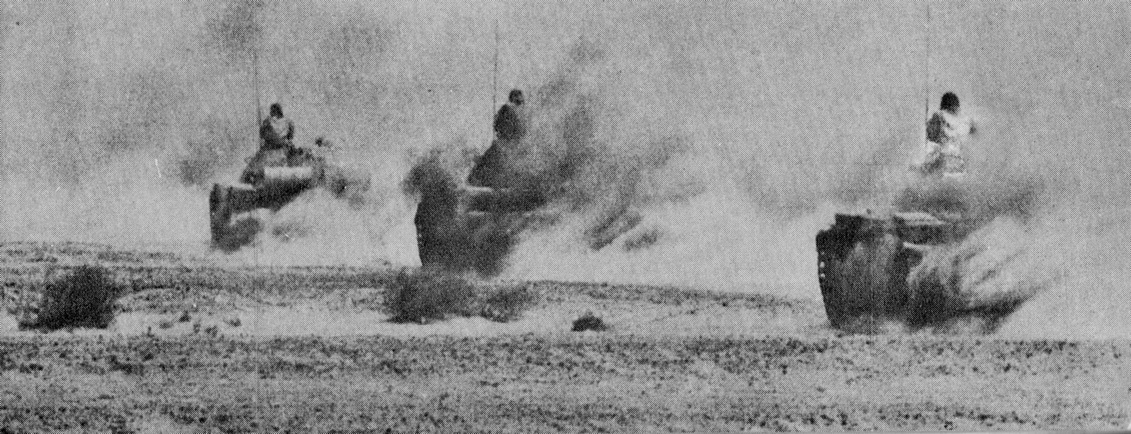
Egyptian tanks advancing in the Sinai desert.

In the early hours of Sunday 7 October, just after midnight, Egyptian infantry, now with tank support, advanced to expand their bridgeheads. Israeli armored formations had experienced heavy losses in trying repeatedly to reach the Bar Lev Line and were disorganized and confused. Many Israeli units, however, stubbornly resisted the Egyptian advance. Twice during the night of 6 to 7 October, groups of tanks and infantry penetrated the bridgeheads to reach the canal line, where they managed to damage two bridges and destroy a number of ferries. Surrounded on all sides, however, these units were soon destroyed. Before sunrise the bridgeheads had reached a depth of 6–9 kilometers (3.7–5.6 mi), and the attacking Israeli units retreated. With sufficient numbers of armor finally on the east bank, reinforcements of infantry began to cross. Dawn on 7 October saw a total of 50,000 men (around 10,000 to each bridgehead) and 400 Egyptian tanks occupying five bridgeheads in the Sinai across the Suez Canal. Egyptian forces reorganised and entrenched themselves in anticipation of Israeli counterattacks.

David Elazar continued to instruct Gonen to evacuate soldiers from strongpoints which were not yet surrounded, even though by 7 October most Israeli defences were encircled. Egyptian losses up to the morning of 7 October were only 280 killed and 20 tanks destroyed. Israeli losses were far heavier; the brigade in the Bar Lev Line was completely surrounded and most of its men were casualties while 200 were captured. Armored losses were 200–300 tanks destroyed. One source puts the losses at roughly 200 by morning, but several battalion-sized attacks to regain the forts around El-Qantarah, and to reach some of the central and southern forts incurred further casualties with over 50 tanks being destroyed. In subsequent days some of the defenders in the Bar Lev Line managed to break through Egyptian forces and return to their lines, or were extracted by Israeli forces in counterattacks that came later on.

As the magnitude of Israeli losses became clear, Gonen made the decision at noon to form a defensive line on the Lateral Road, 30 kilometers (19 mi) east of the canal, and ordered his divisional commanders to deploy accordingly. At noon, elements of Abraham Adan's 162nd Division and Ariel Sharon's 143rd Division began to reach the fronts. Consequently, Gonen divided the front into three divisional commands: Adan was deployed in the northern sector, Sharon in the central sector, and Mandler in the southern sector.

Air strikes continued throughout the day, and Southern Command received optimistic reports during the afternoon from the IAF, which claimed seven bridges knocked out of action, with the remaining ones to be destroyed by evening. In fact, several of the bridges that had been destroyed were decoys. The real bridges meanwhile, had their damaged sections quickly repaired and returned to service. Ten heavy bridges had been laid during the crossing (two bridges in the south were laid but not operational). Now, on 7 October, five of these bridges were removed and placed with the two already in reserve, leaving each division with one heavy bridge and one light bridge.

Egyptian forces widened their bridgeheads that day to narrow the 14–15-kilometer (8.7–9.3 mi) gaps between them. Meanwhile, General Headquarters worked on organizing its forces on the east bank. Egyptian troops had crossed with 24-hours' worth of supplies. By Sunday it became necessary to resupply these forces, but administrative and supply units were in disarray, and to the south problems with laying the bridges further handicapped supply efforts there. 7 October offered a relative lull from the intense fighting that had taken place, allowing the Egyptians to organize battlefield administration. At 19th Division's bridgehead to the south, all efforts to lay three bridges there were abandoned due to difficulties with the terrain. Instead, supplies and reinforcement destined for the division were transferred over 7th Division's bridges to the north, where engineers were more successful in laying the bridges.

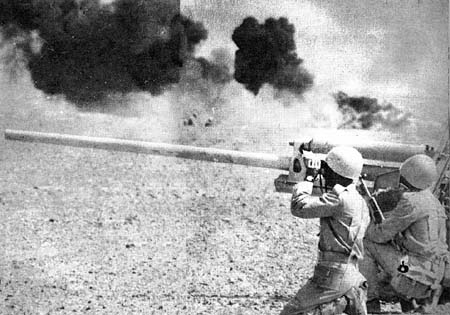
Egyptian artillery conducting a barrage.

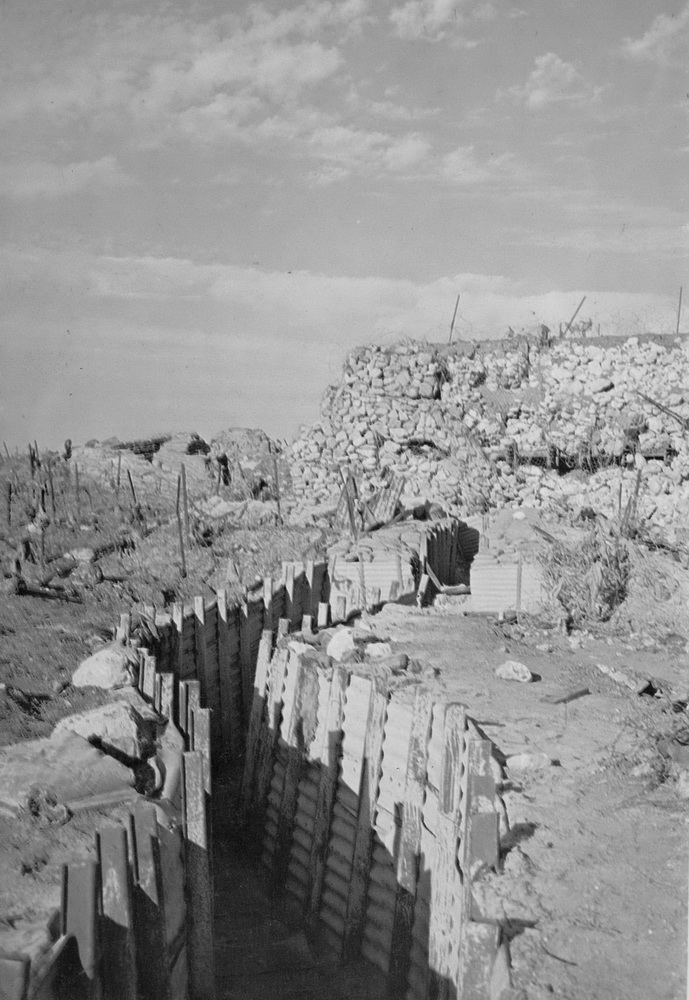
A trench in one of the fortifications of the Bar Lev Line, with a bunker in the background.

Fighting throughout the front did not cease entirely for the rest of the day, most of it taking part around the besieged Israeli defences and strongpoints that still resisted. Meanwhile, the Sa'iqa units airdropped into Sinai the previous day began engaging Israeli reserves heading for the front. The main areas of operation were the central mountain passes, the northern coastal routes, and near the Gulf of Suez. One battalion, transported in 18 helicopters, captured the Ras Sidr Pass south of Port Tawfiq, near the Gulf of Suez. En route four helicopters were shot down, but the survivors, including 9 crewmen, managed to regroup with the rest of the battalion. It held its position for the remainder of the war under extremely difficult conditions, preventing Israeli reserves from using the pass to reach the front. Two companies attempted to establish themselves in central Sinai, between Tasa and Bir Gifgafa. Israeli air interdiction resulted in six helicopter making a forced landing after being hit, while two helicopters turned and withdrew. The forced landings incurred many casualties, particularly due to burns, and the survivors trekked their way back to friendly lines. Only four helicopters reached the designated landing zone, and they could not be flown once more, indicating the suicidal nature of these operations. Albeit a third of their original force, the Sa'iqa managed to block Israeli reserves for over eight hours. Both companies were almost completely destroyed, suffering around 150 dead, including 15 officers. Israeli estimates claim to have downed between ten and twenty helicopters on the first day of the war.

In northern Sinai, a company established itself along the coastal road between Romani and Baluza on 6 October. The following day, it ambushed Colonel Natke Nir's armored brigade, part of Adan's division, destroying around 18 tanks along with other vehicles. The coastal road was blocked for over five hours. Airborne Israeli infantry was committed to support the armor, and in the ensuing battle, another 12 tanks and 6 half-tracks were destroyed. Some 30 soldiers of the brigade were killed, while the Sa'iqa company lost 75 dead. In addition to delaying Israeli reserves, commandos carried out sabotage operations.

The report cards for these operations are highly controversial. Some sources claim the commandos suffered immense casualties and were ineffectual. However, it is clear that these operations inflicted damage and caused confusion and anxiety among the Israelis, who diverted resources to counter these threats, while reservists were slowed down. One Israeli divisional commander also commended the Egyptian Sa'iqa. (Note: Schiff, A History of the Israeli Army, p. 328, Insight Team of the London Sunday Times, Yom Kippur War, Doubleday (publisher), 1974, pp. 169–170. One Israeli source estimates twenty helicopters were shot down and of 1,700 commandos committed in these operations, 1,100 were killed, wounded or captured. However these casualty figures remain controversial. The Insight Team also states that the few commandos that reached their objectives were only a nuisance. However, these operations forced the Southern Command to allocate front-line units to protect installations and perform guard duties, while reserve units en route to the front adopted a cautious approach that delayed their arrival. The elite Israeli reconnaissance companies under Southern Command were also committed to deal with the Sa'iqa. The Egyptians did inflict damage against the Israeli rear in these operations, although at a generally high cost in lives. In general, Israeli sources tend to downplay their significance, while Egyptian sources attribute great importance to them. Israeli divisional commander Abraham Adan, noted that "Natke's experience fighting the stubborn Egyptian commandos who tried to cut off the road around Romani showed again that this was not the Egyptian Army we had crushed in four days in 1967. We were now dealing with a well-trained enemy, fighting with skill and dedication." Gawrych, pp. 37–38)

El-Qantarah also saw heavy fighting as troops from the 18th Division engaged Israeli forces within and around the town. By early morning the division commander, Brigadier General Fuad 'Aziz Ghali, was able to set up his command post there. Close quarter combat and even hand-to-hand fighting took place as the Egyptians cleared the ghost town building by building. Fighting was intense, and by the end of 7 October, the town and its outskirts as well as two nearby fortifications of the Bar Lev Line were under Egyptian control.

==== Israeli conference at Umm Hashiba ====
David Elazar, encouraged by reports of IAF successes, decided to visit Israeli Southern Command. He was accompanied by his aide, Colonel Avner Shalev and the former Israeli Chief of Staff, Yitzhak Rabin. Elazar arrived at Gonen's advance command post at Gebel Umm Hashiba at 18:45; chief among those attending were Gonen, Adan and Mandler. Sharon only arrived after the meeting had been concluded.

At the conference, in light of the little information available on Egyptian dispositions and intentions, and due to a shortage of infantry and artillery, the commanders agreed they could not relieve the surrounded strongpoints on the canal in the near future. There was a general consensus to attack Egyptian forces throwing them off balance, but disagreed on how to do so. Southern Command expected to have 640 tanks on Monday 8 October, of which 530 tanks would be distributed among three divisions: 200 tanks under Adan, 180 under Sharon, and 150 under Mandler after part of his losses were replaced. Estimates put the number of Egyptian tanks at 400, when there were in fact 800 tanks across the canal by Sunday evening. In light of the apparent superiority, Gonen recommended a frontal attack at night with Adan's 162nd Division crossing to the west bank at El-Qantarah and Sharon's 143rd Division crossing into Suez City. Adan however, lacking infantry, urged a cautious approach until more reserves reached the front.

Elazar favored caution as well, and decided on a limited attack on the morning of 8 October. Adan would attack southward against Second Army, remaining 3–5 kilometers (1.9–3.1 mi) away from the canal to avoid Egyptian anti-tank weaponry. Sharon would continue the southward probes towards Ismailia as his division moved into its sector, concentrating at Tasa to support Adan if needed. Kept open was the question of an Israeli counter-crossing should such the Egyptians collapse under Israeli counterattacks. Should Adan succeed, Sharon would attack Third Army's bridgehead in a manner similar to Adan, and then cross to the west bank. Mandler would remain on the defensive, organizing his division which had been mauled by the fighting, and was down to a few dozen tanks. Elazar clearly emphasized that no canal crossing and no attempt to reach the strongpoints would occur without his approval. The meeting ended at 22:00.

Thereafter, Sharon arrived after missing the entire conference. Speaking with Gonen and the other commanders after Elazar had left, Sharon recommended an immediate assault to relieve the beleaguered strongpoints. (Note: Alternatively, Gawrych states that Sharon recommended a concentrated two-division attack against one of the Egyptian bridgeheads. Either way, the proposal was ultimately rejected and did not follow through. Gawrych, p. 42.) Gonen pointed out that this had been the Israeli course of action for the past 14–16 hours, to no avail. However he did not reject Sharon outright, and indeed told him to prepare for such an attack, promising a final decision on the matter before 6:00 at dawn. Nevertheless, Sharon would conform to the original plan for a limited attack on the following day.

=== 8 October ===
The five division-size bridgeheads consolidated themselves on Monday, 8 October into two army-size bridgeheads: the Second Army with its three divisions occupied El-Qantarah in the north to Deversoir in the south, while the Third Army with two divisions occupied the southern end of the Bitter Lakes to a point southeast of Port Tawfiq (at the far end of the canal). These two bridgeheads incorporated a total of 90,000 men and 980 tanks, dug in and entrenched. Each division deployed, in accordance with Operation Badr, two infantry brigades in its forward echelon, and one mechanized infantry brigade in the second echelon. In reserve was one armored brigade. The Egyptians had established anti-tank defences along their lines employing Sagger ATGMs, RPGs, B-10 and B-11 anti tank recoilless rifles.

At dawn a friendly fire incident occurred as the 2nd and 16th Divisions in Second Army were closing the gap between their bridgeheads. While cresting a ridge, two tank platoons from either division confronted each other at 460 meters (1,510 ft). The tank crews were so agitated that they opened fire immediately. Each platoon lost two of its three tanks to direct hits within minutes, and several men were killed.

Shazly visited the front in the early morning before the Israeli attack to form an assessment of the situation. He arrived at Second Army Headquarters where he was briefed on the situation, then went to 2nd Division's advanced headquarters, where he met Brigadier General Hasan Abu Sa'ada and visited the frontline troops. Many of the soldiers had not slept for two nights, but the successful crossing was a morale booster, a tonic as he described it.

Shazly then went southward to 7th Division's bridgehead in Third Army's sector, where traffic was almost at a standstill. Shazly met with 7th division commander Brigadier General Badawy, who informed him of the bridge-laying problems experienced by 19th Division's engineers further south, leading all Third Army supplies and reinforcements to be sent over 7th Division's already congested bridges, creating a solid traffic jam. Despite Sunday's lull, the situation had not yet improved. This created complications, as soldiers and tank crews lost contact with their units and consequently had no idea of their designated positions. Many troops were low on supplies, and some even returned to the west bank of the canal to replenish their food and water supply.

After conferring with the chief engineers of the Second and Third field armies, Shazly became aware that IAF, despite heavy losses, had destroyed so many bridge sections that the Egyptians had lost the equivalent of three heavy bridges, leaving four bridges in reserve along with the five already laid in the canal. This gave rise to concerns about supply in the coming days and weeks. Shazly then discussed the possibility of constructing three bridges in the canal using earth and sand. This would make causeways impregnable against air strikes and artillery. The chief engineer of the Third Army, with whom he discussed the idea, was confident that, given enough bulldozers, the causeways could be constructed in one week.

==== Israeli counterattack ====
Shortly after midnight on 8 October, optimistic field reports expecting an imminent Egyptian collapse caused Gonen to alter plans for the attack. Adan would now attack in the direction of the strongpoints at Firdan and Ismailia. The change was not formulated on precise tactical intelligence, and would come to cause some confusion among Israeli commanders for the rest of the day.

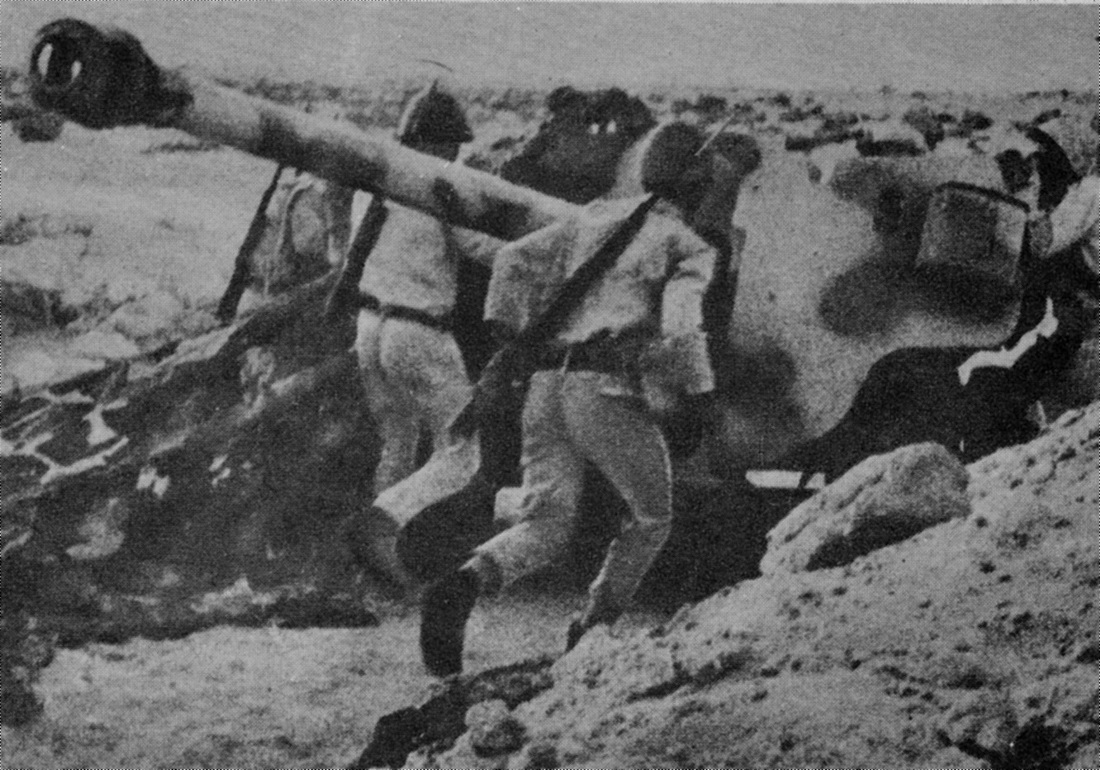
Soldiers move to man a BS-3 anti-tank gun. The Egyptians employed conventional, recoilless, rocket-propelled and guided anti-tank weapons as well as tanks to counter Israeli armored forces.

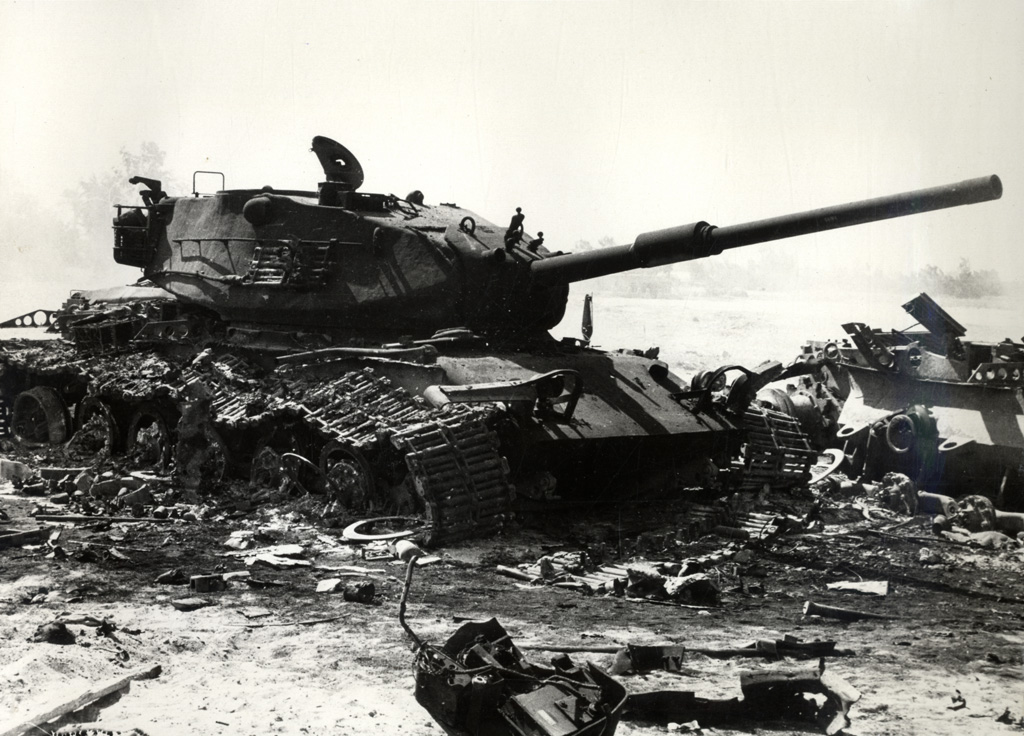
Wreckage of Israeli armor in the aftermath of one of the counterattacks.

Adan's 162nd Armoured Division was deployed along the Baluza–Tasa road to the north. His division was composed of Colonel Natke Nir's armored brigade with 71 tanks, Gabi Amir's brigade with 50 M60 tanks, and Aryeh Keren's brigade with 62 tanks (still en route to the area) for a total of 183 tanks. Adan still planned to avoid Egyptian anti-tank weaponry by having Amir's brigade move southward between Lexicon and Artillery roads (the former road ran immediately alongside the canal, and the latter was 10–15 kilometers (6.2–9.3 mi) east of it), to reach a position that would link the brigade to the Hizayon strongpoint opposite Firdan and the Purkan strongpoint opposite Ismailia. Nir would move in a similar manner to link up with Purkan. Keren would move east of Artillery Road and position his brigade opposite the Matzmed strongpoint at the northern end of the Bitter Lakes. A mechanized infantry brigade with 44 Super Shermans was expected to join in the attack by late morning. Little or no air support would come for the attack; the IAF was concentrated on the Syrian front.

At 07:53, minutes before the Israeli attack was to commence, Israeli forces near El-Qantarah became heavily engaged with a brigade composing the 18th Division's right flank, as Egyptian troops sought to secure the town and its vicinity. Fuad, the division commander supported the brigade with two companies of T-62 tanks. To prevent Israeli forces in the area from being outflanked, Gonen ordered Nir to remain near El-Qantarah to help contain the Egyptian attack. This left Adan with only 50 tanks under Amir's command to carry out the attack.

Amir began the drive south at 08:06, and was ordered to prepare to reach the strongpoints on Adan's signal. Keren was still en route to the area. Once his brigade arrived he would conduct an assault against 16th Division's bridgehead in the direction of Matzmed. However, Amir made an error in navigation, and instead of moving 3 kilometers (1.9 mi) from the canal, he moved along Artillery road, 15 kilometers (9.3 mi) away. Consequently, Amir would be forced to conduct a frontal assault in an east–west direction instead of the north–south flanking maneuver which Adan had planned.

Amir's brigade began to reach the plain between Artillery Road and the Firdan bridge at 09:00. So far no Egyptian resistance of any significance had been encountered. The brigade had the objective of attacking 2nd Division's bridgehead. Abu Sa'ada, the division commander, had the 24th Armored Brigade as the divisional reserve, but he could only commit it in case of an Israeli penetration. Gonen wanted Adan to reach the Hizayon strongpoint, and contacted Elazar in Tel Aviv at 09:55 to request a crossing of the canal. Gonen either downplayed or ignored negative reports and only told Elazar of positive developments. Elazar, who was at a meeting, communicated with Gonen through his assistant and approved of a crossing, also giving permission for Sharon's division to move south.

At 10:40, Gonen ordered Adan to cross to the west bank and Sharon to move towards Suez City. Short of forces, Adan requested that Sharon send a battalion to protect his southern flank. Gonen consented, but Sharon would not comply, and consequently several critical positions would be lost to the Egyptians later on.

Just before the assault commenced, one of Amir's battalions disengaged to restock on ammunition and fuel. The other battalion proceeded with the assault at 11:00. Some 25 tanks carried out an assault planned to be performed by 121 tanks. The Israelis broke through the first Egyptian troops and advanced to within 800 meters (2,600 ft) of the canal. At this point the Israelis came under heavy fire from anti-tank weaponry, artillery and tanks. The battalion lost 18 tanks within minutes, and most of its commanders were either killed or wounded.

By now Nir had disengaged at El-Qantarah, leaving a battalion behind, and arrived opposite the Firdan bridge at 12:30 with two tank battalions. While Amir and Nir discussed plans for an attack, Keren arrived and Adan ordered him to support Nir and Amir by attacking towards Purkan. Meanwhile, Sharon left Tasa and headed for Suez City, leaving a single reconnaissance company to hold vital ridges such as Hamadia and Kishuf, but not the hills to the north, such as Hamutal. Instead, Keren's brigade gained responsibility for these areas, but Sharon's action further endangered Adan's position.

Amir's brigade was now down to one battalion, which was to attack with Nir's brigade of 50 tanks. To Amir's surprise, a reserve armored battalion of 25 tanks commanded by Colonel Eliashiv Shemshi arrived in the area, en route to Keren's brigade. Short of forces, Amir, with Adan's approval, commandeered Shemshi's battalion, and ordered him to provide covering fire for Nir's assault on the Firdan bridge.

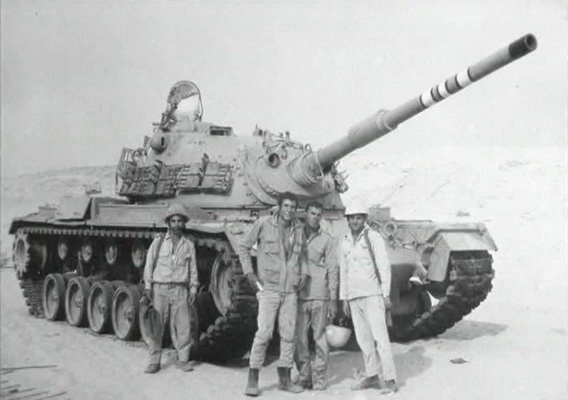
Egyptian soldiers pose in front of a captured Israeli Magach 3 (M48) tank

At around 13:00, a recon group from 2nd Division discovered around 75 tanks concentrating north east of the bridgehead. Ten minutes later the Egyptians intercepted a radio signal in Hebrew. Nir was informing his command that he was ready to attack within twenty minutes. With little time left, Abu Sa'ada decided to take a risky move. Estimating, correctly, that the attack would come be directed between his two forward brigades, the weakest point in his lines, Abu Sa'ada planned to draw Israeli forces into his bridgehead to within three kilometers of the canal before engaging them from all sides, committing all his anti-tank reserves. At 13:30, the attack was carried out by Amir and Nir's brigades. A lack of coordination and communication difficulties between both brigades hampered the attack. Nir's two battalions attacked at the same time in two echelons. The Egyptians allowed the Israelis to advance, then encircled them. When the attackers entered the prepared killing zone, Egyptian armor of the 24th Brigade opened fire on the advancing tanks, complemented by infantry anti-tank weapons on either flank of the Israeli forces, while tank hunting detachments attacked from the rear. Within just 13 minutes, most of the Israeli force was destroyed—the Egyptians destroyed over 50 tanks and captured eight intact. Among the captured were Lieutenant Colonel Asaf Yaguri, a battalion commander, whose unit lost 32 killed. By the end of the attack Nir had just four operational tanks remaining, including his own. Gabi Amir's battalion, attacking to Nir's right, was forced to halt his advance after encountering stiff resistance. Amir requested air support several times, but did not receive any.

==== Egyptian advance ====
Operation Badr called for an enlargement of the bridgeheads on 8 October. To accomplish this, each of the five infantry divisions had to reorganize its forces. Mechanized infantry brigades in the second echelon of divisional lines were to advance between the two forward infantry brigades. Thus the mechanized brigade would form the first line, the two infantry brigades would form the second line, and the reserve armored brigade would constitute a third echelon.

During the afternoon of the 8th, Egyptian artillery barrages and air strikes took place along the entire front against opposing Israeli forces. The Israelis, who believed they were on the counter-offensive, were surprised at the sight of advancing Egyptian troops. Not all advancing Egyptian units managed to reach the 12 kilometers (7.5 mi) mark necessary to control Artillery Road, but each division held positions more than 9 kilometers (5.6 mi) deep. In Second Army's sector, the 16th Infantry Division was the most successful by occupying the strategic positions of Mashchir, Televiza, Missouri and Hamutal after fighting that lasted between 2:00 and 4:30 pm. Hamutal was 15 kilometers (9.3 mi) from the canal and overlooked the juncture of Ismailia and Artillery Roads. Brigadier General 'Adil Yusri lost his leg while commanding his brigade's attack on these positions. The deepest penetration was in Third Army's sector, where the bridgehead reached a depth of nearly 18 kilometers (11 mi). The Egyptians also captured several additional Bar Lev forts. (Note: The 16th Infantry Brigade of the 16th Infantry Division managed to capture Fort Matzmed, composed of two strongpoints 500 meters apart. The battalion tasked with seizing the fort failed in its first attempt. A second attack after midnight succeeded in occupying the northern strongpoint, and the southern strongpoint was seized before dawn. The Israelis lost 37 captured and 20 dead. In the south, a battalion of the 19th Infantry Division seized Fort Mafzeah. Two attacks made since 6 October had failed until the Egyptians discovered a spotter in a former UN peacekeeping observation post, who had been directing effective Israeli air and artillery strikes to defend the fort. Thereafter the battalion managed to assault and capture the fort. The Israelis lost 15 captured and 38 dead. Hammad, pp. 181–183)

The Israelis now made an attempt to regain the lost ground. Keren's brigade organized for an assault on Hamutal Hill. One battalion provided covering fire, while two battalions under Lieutenant Colonels Dan Spair and Amir (not to be confused with the brigade commander Gabi Amir) attacked with 27 tanks. Nearly 1,000 meters (3,300 ft) from Egyptian positions, Dan Sapir was killed when his tank took a direct hit, disrupting his battalion's attack. Amir's battalion continued fighting until dusk after losing seven tanks.

Gonen, starting to realise the gravity of Adan's position, ordered Sharon at 14:45 to pull back and return to his initial positions. The Erez Armored Brigade arrived to offer assistance to Keren, but poor coordination between the commanders led to the failure of further attempts to capture Hamutal Hill. By the end of the day Adan's division alone had lost around 100 tanks.

== Aftermath ==
Operation Badr was the opening battle of the Yom Kippur War in the Sinai, and the first major Arab victory against the Israelis in years.

By repelling a division-sized counterattack on 8 October, and establishing bridgeheads on the east bank to a depth of around 15 kilometers, the Egyptians had accomplished the objectives of Operation Badr. At the start of the war, U.S. Secretary of State Henry Kissinger believed that the better-equipped Israelis would secure victory within a few days, and thus tried to delay a ceasefire in the United Nations Security Council. The counterattack on 8 October however, came against American expectations. Kissinger was taken aback when told of the extent of Israel's losses on the morning of 9 October by Israeli Ambassador Simcha Dinitz, and asked "Explain to me, how could 400 tanks be lost to the Egyptians?" Dinitz may have threatened Kissinger with the use of nuclear weapons against Egypt and Syria in order to underline the urgency of Israel's situation and push the U.S. into initiating an airlift to replace Israel's losses. Later that day Kissinger relayed U.S. President Richard Nixon's decision to initiate Operation Nickel Grass—which aimed to replace all of Israel's material losses—to Dinitz.

The prevailing view of Kissinger and many IDF officers on the Sinai Front was that the tide would quickly turn in their favor. The course of combat on 8 October thus came as a shock. At the end of the day Gonen, commented "It's not the Egyptian Army of 1967." In a press conference at night on 8 October, not knowing that the counteroffensive had been defeated, Elazar claimed that the destruction of the Egyptian Army was underway, and that the IDF would soon "break their [the Arabs military personnel's] bones." He would later regret these statements. Israeli commanders began to doubt Gonen's ability. In a meeting with Israeli commanders after midnight on 9 October, Elazar decided to suspend offensive operations until the Syrians had been neutralized, especially since there were just 400 tanks left in the Sinai. Disregarding this new order, Sharon division mounted a major brigade-sized attack the following day. Despite initial successes, the Israelis had been repulsed by the end of the day with no gains, losing around 60 tanks in the process. Gonen was furious at Sharon, not only because of his violation of the decision to remain on the defensive, but also because he had repeatedly disobeyed direct orders from Gonen on a number of occasions. Elazar was equally livid, but rather than remove Sharon, an insubordinate but innovative commander with political connection to the opposition party, Elazar decided to replace Gonen, who had proven to be out of his depth, inept at being an operational commander. Former Chief of Staff Chaim Bar-Lev was brought out of retirement to replace Gonen. To avoid the appearance of firing him, Gonen was retained as deputy to Bar-Lev by Elazar. By 10 October, the front settled into a stalemate.

The success achieved by Operation Badr surprised Egyptian commanders, whose confidence soared. Sadat came under pressure to press the offensive towards the Sinai Passes, but remained unyielding, holding to the original goal of waging a limited war. Ahmed Ismail and Shazly were also in agreement with Sadat's opinion. However, appeals from the Syrians, whose situation was desperate by 9 October, ultimately forced Sadat to change his mind for political reasons, against the protests of his commanders. Consequently, Egypt would lose the initiative to Israel when it launched its unsuccessful attack eastwards on 14 October.

=== Political impact ===
Soon after the war, many Israelis demanded an impartial inquiry to investigate what became known as the machdal (the blunder), with a focus on the shortcomings of the government and the army, particularly their lack of preparedness for the attack and its ramifications. Golda Meir finally agreed to the formation of the Agranat Commission towards the end of November 1973. War veterans and members of the public attacked Meir and Moshe Dayan, while Israeli generals criticised one another's performance.

While Meir and the Israeli Labor Party won the elections held in late December, the release of the Agranat Commission's findings in April 1974 and its failure to accuse the nation's political leadership of any shortcomings—while recommending the dismissal of several senior officers—led to widespread public outrage. Meir resigned in response to public criticism, but Dayan remained steadfast. Eventually, the 1977 elections saw the end of the Labor Party's unchallenged reign over Israeli politics with the election of Menachem Begin and the Likud Party.

The 1973 war convinced the Israelis of the necessity of negotiations with the Arabs. This unprecedented willingness, coupled with Sadat's diplomatic initiatives and intercession by the United States to break barriers of mistrust between Egypt and Israel, made possible the long series of discussions between both nations. The negotiations ultimately resulted in the 1978 Camp David Accords, and the peace treaty between Egypt and Israel in 1979. Thus, without resorting to another major war, Sadat had been able to regain the Sinai through diplomatic means.

== Online publication ==
- Gawrych, Dr. George W. (1996). The 1973 Arab-Israeli War: The Albatross of Decisive Victory. Combat Studies Institute, U.S. Army Command and General Staff College. p. 97. In parts:
  - Intro
  - Part I p. 1–20
  - Part II p. 21–30
  - Part III p. 31–40
  - Part IV p. 41–52
  - Part V p. 53–61
  - Part VI p. 62–72
  - Part VII p. 73–82
  - Notes p. 83–97
