= Albert Mandler =

Israeli general (1929–1973)

Avraham Albert Mandler
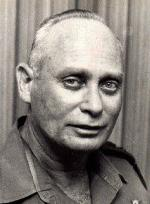
- Native name: אברהם אלברט מנדלר
- Born: May 3, 1929; Linz, First Austrian Republic
- Died: October 13, 1973 (aged 44) Sinai, Egypt
- Buried: Kiryat Shaul Cemetery
- Allegiance: Israel
- Branch: Israeli Ground Forces
- Service years: 1946–1973
- Rank: Major general
- Commands: 8th Mechanized Infantry Brigade
- Conflicts: 1948 Palestine war Six-Day War; Yom Kippur War †

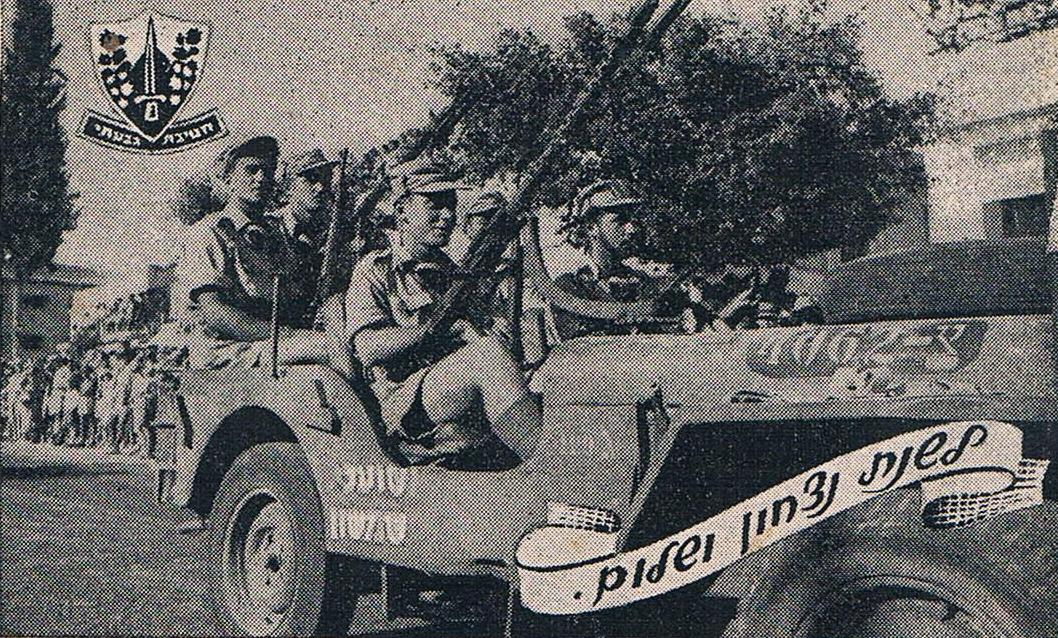
Albert Mandler sitting in the front passenger seat of a jeep during a parade in September 1948.

Avraham Albert Mandler (Hebrew: אברהם מנדלר; 3 May 1929 – 13 October 1973) was an Israeli major general. His journey to the then British Mandate of Palestine started from having been expelled at age 10 from his school in Linz, Austria, before fleeing with his mother through multiple borders until reaching Romania and boarding the last illegal boat the British allowed to anchor in Haifa. At age 16, he joined the Haganah, at 19 he fought outside Jerusalem, and in subsequent wars he climbed the ranks until, as a Major-General, he fought in Sinai until his death in the 1973 Yom Kippur War. In the 1967 Six-Day War, he was a colonel commanding the 8th Mechanized Infantry Brigade. This brigade pushed "elements of the Shazli Force and the Egyptian 6th Division straight into an ambush laid by Arik Sharon" at Nakhl on June 8, 1967.

During the Yom Kippur War, Major-General Mandler was commander of the IDF's armored forces in the Sinai. He was killed in action on 13 October 1973 when an Egyptian missile hit his command car, possibly artillery fire. There are claims that this happened after his voice was intercepted and identified by Egyptian electronic warfare units using tactical COMINT equipment, who immediately transmitted his position to the nearest Second Army artillery battery, but this was disputed by Shmuel Gonen, who experimented the very next day to show that the very brief time between the radio transmission and Mandler's death ("thirty seconds") was not long enough for such a process to have taken place.

Streets in Ramat Gan, where he lived, Tel Aviv, BeerSheba, and Beit Shemesh were named after him.
