= Port Fuad =

Port Fuad بورفؤاد
- City
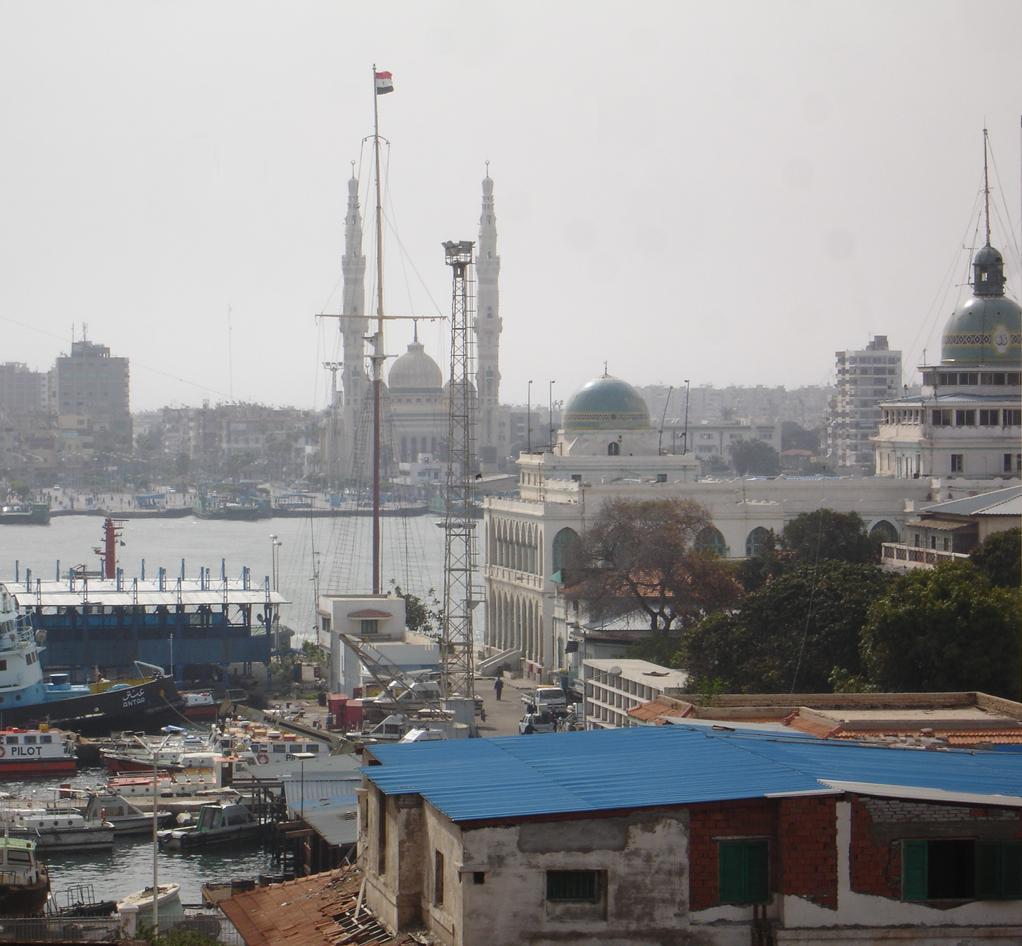
- Port Fouad as seen across the Suez Canal from Port Said.
- Interactive map of Port Fuad
- Location in Egypt
- Coordinates: 31°15′N 32°19′E
- Country: Egypt
- Governorate: Port Said
- Established: 1926
- Founded by: Fuad I of Egypt

Government
  - Head: Samar El-Mowafi

Population (2015)
  - Total: 81,591
- Time zone: UTC+2 (EET)
  - Summer (DST): UTC+3 (EEST)
- Area code: +20 (66)

Port Fuad or Port Fouad (Arabic: بورفؤاد Borfoʾād, IPA: [boɾ.foˈʔæːd]) is a city in Port Said Governorate, Egypt. Port Fuad is located in northeastern Egypt at the northwesternmost tip of the Sinai Peninsula on the Asian side of the Suez Canal, across from the city of Port Said. Port Fuad is considered a suburb of Port Said and together they form a metropolitan area of over one million residents. Along with the likes of Colón, Panama (North/South America) and Istanbul, Turkey (Asia/Europe), it is one of the few transcontinental cities in the world, in that it spans across two continents (Africa/Asia).

Port Fuad has a population of 81,591 (as of 2015).

== History ==
Port Fuad was established in 1926, principally to relieve overcrowding in Port Said, and was named after King Fuad I (also transliterated as Fouad), the first holder of the title King of Egypt in the modern era (having previously held the title Sultan of Egypt).

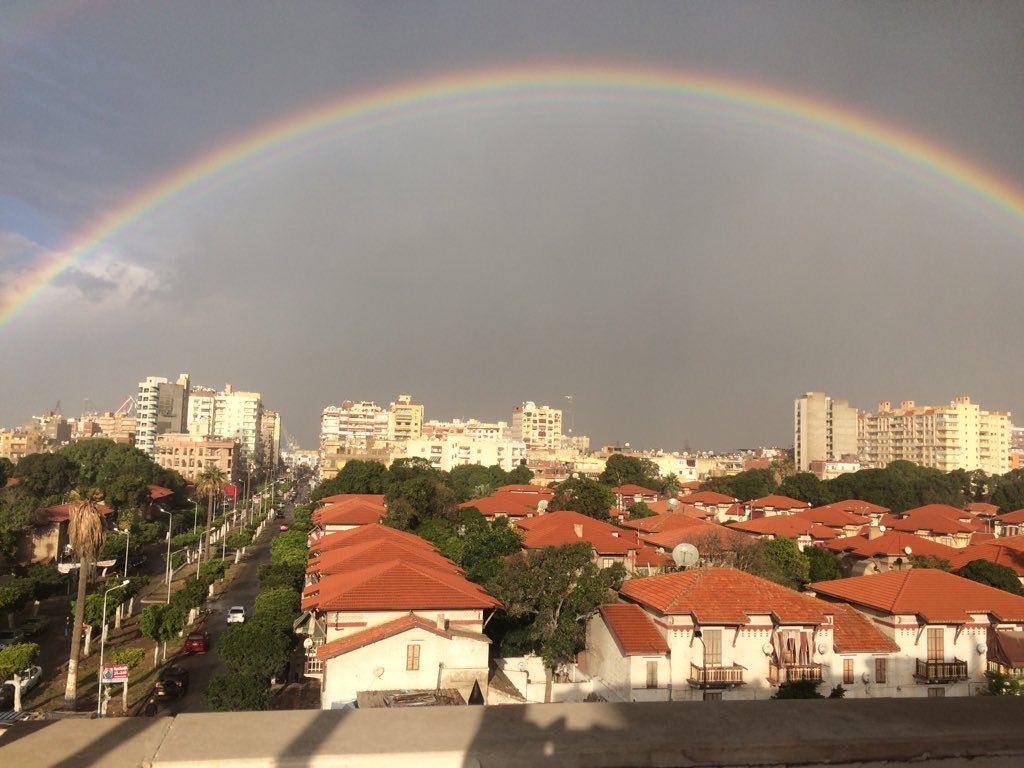
View of the city

After the war of 1967, Port Fuad was the only piece of Sinai held by the Egyptians. The Israeli army tried to capture Port Fuad during the War of Attrition in the battle of Ras al Aish but was defeated by the Egyptian forces. After the October War, in the Camp David Accord of 1978, Israel agreed to return Sinai to Egypt peacefully, and later the two countries signed a peace treaty. Today Port Fuad is a major air defence position for Egypt. Despite its important location, as of 2006, Port Fuad was still considered a residential zone, with very few facilities and no major downtown or city center.

== Geography ==
The city is located on Port Fuad Island, a triangular island bounded by the Mediterranean to the North, the Suez Canal to the West, and the relatively new eastern channel from the Suez Canal to the Mediterranean to the East. Lying on the eastern side of the main canal.

The Suez Canal Authority forms the main employment of the city, and its employees comprise most of the population. It has one general hospital.

== Transport ==
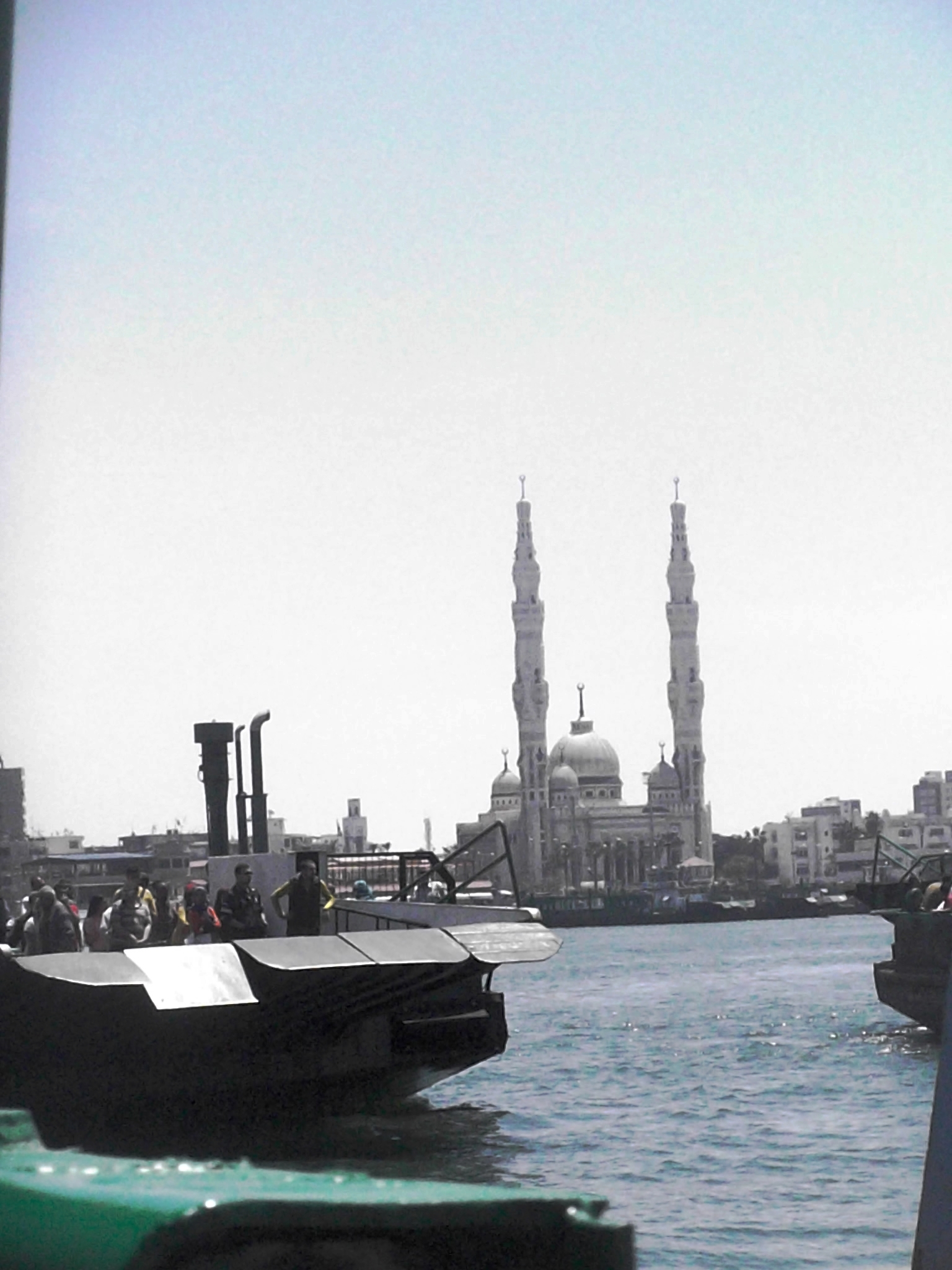
The ferry from Port Said

Until 2016 the town was accessible only by ferry to Port Said. Three ferry lines: the "Port Fouad Ferry" and "Al-Raswa Ferry" from Port Said, and the "Tafreea Ferry" from Port Said East.

In 2016 the floating bridge to Port Said was opened.

=== Port Said East ===
On the Sinai side of the canal, Port Said East is a recently launched development that contains the Suez Canal Container Terminal which opened in 2004. A side canal at Port Said East was opened in 2016.

In November 2015, President Al-Sisi publicly launched a new harbour development project at East Port Said.

In May 2018, an agreement was signed between Russia and Egypt for the development of a Russian Industrial Zone.

== See also ==
- Port Said
- Port Said Governorate
