= Shmuel Gonen =

Israeli general (1930 – 1991)

- שמואל גונן
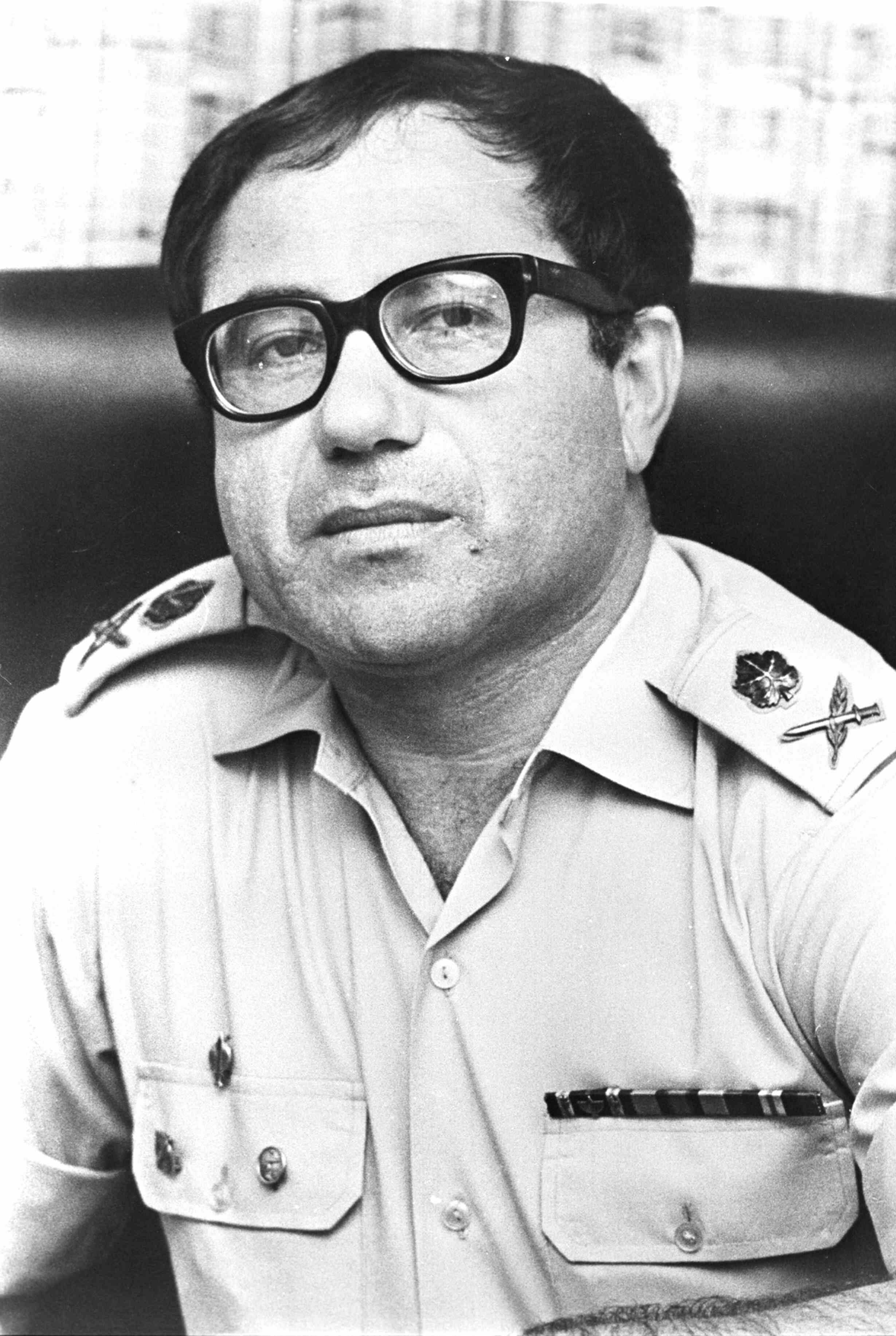
- Born: 1930; Wilno, Wilno Voivodeship, Poland (now Vilnius, Lithuania)
- Died: 3 September 1991 (aged 60–61); Milan, Italy
- Military career
- Allegiance: Palmach; Israel Defense Forces
- Service years: 1944–1974
- Rank: Major General
- Nickname: 'Gorodish'
- Commands: 82nd Battalion; 7th Armored Brigade; Training Division; Southern Command; Solomon Region, Sinai
- Conflicts: 1948 Arab-Israeli War; Suez Crisis; Six-Day War; War of Attrition; Yom Kippur War
- Awards: Medal of Courage

Shmuel "Gorodish" Gonen (Hebrew: שמואל גונן; 14 December 1930 – 30 September 1991) was a Polish-born Israeli general and Chief of the Southern Command of the Israel Defense Forces during the Yom Kippur War.

== Early life ==
Shmuel Gonen was born as Shmuel Gorodish in Wilno, Poland, to Iudel and Rockhla (nee Pilnik) Gorodish. He immigrated to the British Mandate of Palestine with his parents and three siblings at the age of three. He studied at the Mercaz HaRav and Etz Chaim Yeshivas. Gonen joined the Haganah at fourteen, and participated in the battles over Jerusalem in the 1948 Arab-Israeli War, being wounded five times.

After the war, he remained in the Israel Defense Forces (IDF), rising through the ranks of the Armored Corps. He commanded a tank company during the 1956 Sinai Campaign and was awarded the Medal of Courage. He was later charged with overseeing the integration of the new Centurion tank into the IDF, and later commanded the first battalion composed of these tanks.

In 1966, he was appointed commander of the 7th Brigade. It was in this capacity, during the Six-Day War, that he led his troops from the Rafah salient right up to the Suez Canal. After the war, he delivered a famous speech, entitled "My Glorious Brothers, Deserving of Fame", which included the famous line: "We looked death straight in the face, and it lowered its eyes at us."

Throughout his army years, Gonen was not well-liked by his subordinates, who viewed his methods as unjust and Draconian. He was known to set especially low-speed limits for the men of his brigade, only to flout these speed limits himself. It was also documented in a popular Israeli book "חשופים בצריח" ("Chasufim Batzariach", "Exposed in the Turret") that he would deliberately cause his men to fail inspections and then punish them for it. He was overly strict, often meting out severe punishment to soldiers accused of minor offenses such as failure to polish their boots. His subordinates often requested a transfer to a different unit.

In March 1968, Gonen oversaw the armored corps in the Battle of Karameh in Jordan, where Yasser Arafat and the PLO had their base. A few armored vehicles were left on the scene and used by the PLO for propaganda. He continued to rise through the ranks, and on 15 July 1973, he replaced Ariel Sharon as Chief of the Southern Command.

== Yom Kippur War and Agranat Commission ==
Gonen's response to the Egyptian attack during the Yom Kippur War and his actions during the first days of fighting (culminating in the disastrous attack on Hizayon on October 8) was deemed a failure by the army's General Staff, and he was replaced on 10 October by Haim Bar-Lev. The Agranat Commission, which investigated the events leading up to the war, wrote about him that:

He failed to fulfill his duties adequately, and bears much of the responsibility for the dangerous situation in which our troops were caught.

He was removed from all command upon the publication of the Commission's interim report, but this was revoked once the final report was released, and Gonen was given a new position on the General Staff. In both the media and public perception, however, he was considered responsible for many of the fiascos of the war.

== Post-war ==
Gonen resigned from the IDF in 1974 and left for Africa, where he embarked on various business ventures. He never returned to Israel except for short visits.

In writing of Gonen in his comprehensive book on the war, Abraham Rabinovich said of him:

The most tragic figure to emerge in the Israeli military hierarchy from the war was Shmuel Gonen. The ignominy of being superseded as commander on the southern front at the height of the war was compounded by his being forced to leave the army after the final Agranat Report. Although the Israeli establishment usually finds suitable jobs for retired generals, he was offered none. Gonen believed Dayan to be responsible for his disgrace and would tell reporters that he had considered walking into Dayan's office and shooting him.

Instead, he spent thirteen years in the jungles of the Central African Republic searching for diamonds with the intention, he said, of becoming wealthy enough to hire the best lawyers in Israel to prove the Agranat findings mistaken and clear his name. He reportedly made and lost one or two fortunes but rejected appeals by his family and friends to abandon his obsession. A reporter who visited him in the jungle after nine years found him somewhat mellowed, self-aware, and not without sardonic humor, and still sprinkling his conversation with apt quotes from the Talmud. The tough soldier appeared to find satisfaction in coping with the brutal challenges of the jungle rather than nursing his grievances in the cafes of Tel Aviv. Some would see it as a form of penance. He died of a heart attack in 1991 during one of his periodic trips to Europe. Among the few possessions returned to his family were maps of Sinai, on which he had refought the war during his jungle exile, and a copy of Kabbalistic work in which the former yeshiva student may have sought explanations for the disaster that had overtaken him beyond what the maps could tell. (Rabinovich, The Yom Kippur War, p. 506)

In an interview with the Maariv daily newspaper on 7 August 2003, his assistant, Amir Porat, revealed that Gonen considered assassinating Moshe Dayan after the war and that he lived in fear that he would somehow "disappear". Throughout his entire military career, he was considered to be a strict disciplinarian, a political right-winger, and even a militarist.

His tragic life story was the subject of a play, Gorodish, by Israeli author Hillel Mittelpunkt.
