= Attaqa Mountain Pumped Storage Power Plant =

- Interactive map of Attaqa Mountain Pumped Storage Power Plant
- Country: Egypt
- Location: Suez
- Coordinates: 29°57′51″N 32°15′25″E
- Owner: PowerChina

Power Station
- Installed capacity: 2400MW

Attaqa Mountain Pumped Storage Power Plant is an ongoing hydroelectricity power plant currently in development with a planned total capacity of 2400MWp. It is located in Suez, Egypt and is set to be completed in 2024.

== Financial impacts ==
The Exim Bank of China agreed to provide $2.6b for the project and the agreement on the interest rate, repayment period of the loan and grace period are being negotiated.
