= Battle of Suez =

1973 battle of the Yom Kippur War

Coordinates: 29°58′N 32°33′E

- Part of the Yom Kippur War
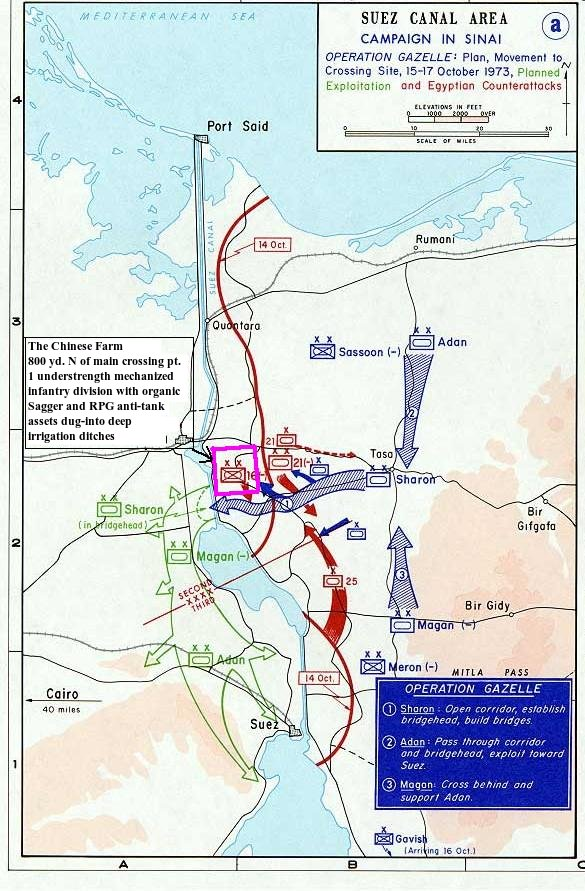
- Map of the Sinai campaign.
Date	October 24–25, 1973
Location	Suez, Egypt
Result	Egyptian victory

Belligerents
Egypt	Israel

Commanders and leaders
Youssef Afifi; Adel Islam (garrison commandant)	Avraham Adan; Yossi Yoffe; Nahum Zaken

Strength
Anti-tank teams Numerous army units with light weapons Local police forces and militia	1 armored brigade 1 infantry battalion

Casualties and losses
Minimal	At least 80 killed and 120 wounded 40 tanks destroyed

The Battle of Suez was fought on October 24–25, 1973 between the Israel Defense Forces and the Egyptian Army in the Egyptian city of Suez. It was the closing battle of the Yom Kippur War, before a ceasefire took effect.

On October 23, with the imminent arrival of UN observers to the front, Israel decided to capture Suez, assuming it would be poorly defended. An armored brigade and an infantry battalion from the Paratroopers Brigade were committed to the task, and entered the city without a battle plan. The armored column was ambushed and suffered heavy losses, while the paratroopers came under intense fire, with many trapped inside a local building. The armored column and part of the infantry were evacuated during the day, while the main paratrooper battalion eventually managed to leave the city and return to Israeli lines. This battle is considered a rare example of defenders successfully repelling an attack in urban warfare.

== Background ==
At 4:00 pm on Tuesday, October 23, the United Nations Security Council met in New York City to reconfirm the ceasefire and send observers to the fighting front. At 6:00 pm, General Ensio Siilasvuo, head of the UN Emergency Force in Cairo, called the Israeli Defense Minister, Moshe Dayan, and told him of the decision. Dayan suggested that the ceasefire go into effect at 7:00 am local time, thirty-six hours after the original ceasefire was supposed take effect, and Siilasvuo accepted. The Israeli Chief of Staff, David Elazar, said in the Kirya that he was in a dilemma. From a military perspective, the IDF needed a few more days to make the Egyptian Third Army surrender and cut off the Second Army, which would collapse the entire Egyptian military. On the other hand, Israel had a great debt to the United States as a result of the massive arms shipments of Operation Nickel Grass. He later said it was the latter consideration that made him accept the ceasefire.

The town of Suez had about 260,000 residents before the War of Attrition, but most of them left during that conflict. However, there were enough men to form a militia, which would make up part of the city's defense force. On October 23, division commander Major-General Avraham Adan had three armored brigades and a makeshift infantry brigade made up of five or six battalions. By October 24, Israel had two brigades on the outskirts of the city, and one battalion from Yoffe's paratroopers brigade southwest of the town at the Gulf of Suez near the old oil refinery. Suez was thus completely isolated from Egypt from the west, and so was most of the Third Army. Yoffe had pushed across the Sarag road west of Suez put a further blocked the Egyptians. Capturing Suez was not considered psychologically or strategically important, although it was presumed to hold supplies for the Third Army. Throughout October 22 to 23, many Egyptian officers and soldiers had withdrawn into Suez. Most of these belonged to administrative and supply units that had been stationed on the west bank of the canal. They also contained a number of units from Third Army that had been engaging Israeli forces since October 16. The number of Egyptian forces inside Suez reached almost 5,000 men, possessing only small arms and assault rifles. Brigadier General Yusuf 'Afifi commanding the 19th Infantry Division east of the canal, reinforced the city with an ATGM company and a tank-hunting team. On its way to Suez, the company had expended its missiles in an engagement with Israeli tanks, destroying more than nine tanks. This left Egyptian forces in the city with a small number of RPG-7 weapons and RPG-43 grenades.

== Prelude ==
At 2:00 am, General Shmuel Gonen called Adan and asked him if he could capture Suez in the two to two and half hours between dawn and the ceasefire. Adan answered that it depended on the Egyptian defenses in the town, but that he thought that at least part of the town could be taken. Gonen said: "Okay, if it's Beersheba, go ahead; if it's Stalingrad, don't do it!", referring to Operation Yoav and the Battle of Stalingrad, respectively. Adan gave his orders accordingly. Israel argued that the attack would not be a violation of the ceasefire if it was launched before 7:00 am, even if the battle continued after that hour, since the Arabs were the ones who chose when to start the war and when to call for a ceasefire. Israel also claimed that the ceasefire did not apply to "mopping up" operations that were altering the rear areas and not the front line. Intelligence knew of a commando battalion, two infantry battalions and an antitank missile company. Since Egyptian soldiers had been mostly surrendering during the previous two days, Adan assumed the defenders of Suez would not resist.

An armored brigade, under the command of Colonel Aryeh Keren, had set up its headquarters west of Suez. Keren was in charge of the attack and ordered Yossi Yoffe to lead the attack with his reserve paratroopers using nine captured Soviet APCs, and drive up the main street of the town. He said the confidence based on which he was being sent was groundless. He said he had only one small map and had seen no air photos and asked for time to draw a plan. Adan pressured Keren to capture Suez before the arrival of the observers, and Keren told Yoffe that "in the armored corps, we take our orders while we're on the move", and gave thirty minutes to organize. A tank battalion, under the command of Lieutenant-Colonel Nahum Zaken was to lead the attack with its own infantry detachment, while Yoffe was to follow and leave platoons to secure the intersections.

== Battle ==
=== Ambush ===
At 10:50 Zaken's column, stretched for over a mile, started moving up the main street, an extension of the Cairo-Suez highway. His battalion was divided into three groups, each containing eight tanks, each tank followed by an APC or halftrack. Zaken had three miles to go before reaching a large square on the bank of the Gulf of Suez. Along the way, he saw Egyptian soldiers, mostly unarmed, and some of them raised their hands in surrender when they saw the Israeli column. All the Israeli tank and APC commanders were standing in their turrets.

Meeting no resistance, the column reached the second intersection at the Al-Arba'een square. A member of the militia, Mahmoud 'Awad, fired two RPG rounds at the lead tank. One round caused superficial damage, and the other missed. Further ahead, the militia had set up another ambush. Ibrahim Suleiman, positioned in a hideout between Cinema Royal and Cinema Egypt, heard the explosions, and asked his comrade, Mohamed Sarhan, to prepare an RPG round. At a range of 12 meters, Suleiman fired his RPG, hitting the turret ring. The tank blew up, and its cannon tilted to the ground. Moments later, Sarhan fired an RPG round against the APC trailing the lead tank. The APC, carrying paratroopers inside, caught fire. At this point, masses of civilians and soldiers began moving towards the square from the adjacent buildings and from roads leading to the square. The column came to a halt, and began receiving heavy small arms fire, also coming under attack by hand grenades. Within minutes, twenty out of the twenty-four Israeli tank commanders were hit. The Israelis panicked, and began disembarking their vehicles and taking cover in nearby buildings. One group of soldiers tried to enter Cinema Royal, but were repulsed at the entrance. One of the APCs that were hit was carrying the brigade's intelligence group. The group abandoned the APC, and all nine men entered a nearby building, where they were presumably killed. The remainder of the battalion turned around to retreat, which was disorderly. The retreating forces came under attack by small arms, grenades and Molotov cocktails. Four tanks came up behind Sidi Al-Arba'een Mosque, but were ambushed by soldiers from the 19th Division, forcing the tanks to retreat.

Zaken, in the second tank, tried to reach his company commanders on the radio, but got no reply. He called the crewmen and told and learned that many of the commanders were either dead or wounded. He told them to keep moving to get out of the ambush and fire all weapons. The battalion made it to the square at the end of the streets and lined up facing the sources of fire. One tank commander Captain Menashe Goldblatt, who had been hit in the shoulder and lost his consciousness, recovered and was asked by Zaken to go from tank to tank and talk to the crews. He found that many of the commanders were either dead or wounded, and that many of the men were in shock. He appointed gunners and loaders as tank commanders, assigned them fire sectors and told them to switch their radio frequency from the company frequency to the battalion frequency so that they could speak directly to Zaken. One tank commander was not wounded but refused to take his head out of the turret and Goldblatt warned him that he would personally fire a shell at him if he didn't start functioning.

The casualties were transferred to an APC which surprised the Egyptians as it drove back up the main street, and managed to make it through. The APC crew left the casualties at an aid station and tried to drive back and rejoin the battalion. Halfway through the APC was hit by an RPG, which killed one man and wounded almost all the others, but the driver managed to get out of the city again. A second APC carrying dead and wounded tried to make a dash out of the city and was stopped by heavy fire, but the driver heard on the radio that the paratroopers were on their way.

=== Trap ===
The paratroopers started going down the avenue and came under fire. They could not distinguish where the enemy fire was coming from. Yoffe's APC was hit by an RPG, killing four of his men and wounding him as well as others. The vehicles pulled over and the soldiers took cover in adjacent buildings, most of them entering Al-Arba'een Police Station, a two-story building surrounded by a tall brick wall. In a very brief firefight the paratroopers wounded two and captured eight policemen. Ten minutes later the second floor was cleared. Lieutenant David Amit, the ranking unwounded officer, organized the defenses of the fifty paratroopers inside. He posted men at windows and behind the brick wall in the front of the building to block the entrance. A room was used as an aid station. Five men positioned themselves on the roof an adjacent building and began firing on the surrounding Egyptians. The policemen launched two attempts to break into the police station and rescue those held inside. In one of the attempts, the Egyptians broke into the building from a side entrance and advanced toward the aid station, and the battalion doctor and his medics opened fire on them. Yoffe's leg had been badly ripped but he refused morphine in order to stay alert. When the Egyptian fire stopped, he told his men that the Egyptians were preparing for an attack. The building was then attacked by RPGs and grenades, and the second floor caught fire. Yoffe told the doctor to burn the maps and papers that might help the Egyptian intelligence. Having lost much blood, he kept losing consciousness. The fire was eventually doused and the attack repulsed. Both attempts failed had cost the Egyptians another eight policemen killed.

Outside the police station, both sides were still firing on each other. A few wounded Israelis who were unable to take cover in the nearby buildings lay stranded on the streets. The Egyptians concentrated their fire against the paratroopers in the building. The Israelis decided to release a police officer to inform the Egyptians of their desire to surrender, provided the Egyptians guaranteed they would not be harmed. The police officer left the building and told Sarhan that the Israelis wanted to surrender. Sarhan took the officer to Colonel Fathy 'Abbas, head of intelligence in the southern sector of the canal. 'Abbas met both men before noon that day, and was enthusiastic to accept the Israeli surrender and end the fighting, especially considering the potential intelligence gains. 'Abbas asked both men to go back to the police station and negotiate terms of surrender with the Israelis. They were unable to enter the building however, as the shooting would not stop and there was no overall commander in control of the militia surrounding the police station. The police officer, an old man, lost his nerve and would not come near the building. Consequently, no negotiations took place and there would be no Israeli surrender.

The armored forces made several failed attempts to break through to the building. When one force approached, they threw furniture out the window to signal their location, but the vehicles' hatches were closed and drove pass the building, all the while under small arms fire. The armored force noticed another paratroop group, under the command of Lieutenant-Colonel Yaakov Hisdai, with eighty men, most of them wounded, which followed Yoffe's battalion. All but sixty men were rescued.

At around 4:00 pm, Ibrahim Suleiman and three others tried to break into the building. Suleiman went around the building and climbed a pole, hoping to take the Israelis by surprise. However, he was spotted and killed. Two others were killed while trying to break in from the front, after coming under massive fire from the paratroopers in the second floor. A few Egyptians climbed up to the rooftop adjacent to the police station where five paratroopers positioned themselves. The rooftop was cleared and all five Israelis were killed after vicious close quarter combat involving hand-to-hand fighting.

Mahmoud 'Awad, fearing the Israelis might try to recover their abandoned armor, resolved to completely destroy the fifteen tanks and APCs, all damaged or destroyed, that lined the streets leading to the square. At midnight, he poured considerable amounts of gasoline on them and set them on fire.

=== Escape ===
As darkness fell, Adan ordered the armored forces out of the city. They were evacuated along the gulf shore, which had been cleared. Adan learned that another force was also meeting stiff resistance in the green belt north of the town, and could spare only one battalion, in addition to another battalion from near Shalufa. Zaken's battalion had eighteen men killed, thirty-five wounded and three disabled tanks which were abandoned. Adan ordered the paratroopers to get out of the city on foot. Hisdai and Keren spoke in the Hebrew equivalent of pig latin to confuse the Egyptians, and Hisdai asked to have tank projectors beam lights toward the sky to indicate the location of the nearest Israeli unit. He checked the route and returned to lead his troops out.

Yoffe's troops were over two miles into the city and after dark others also joined him in the police station, totaling ninety men, twenty-three of them wounded. They made several dashes to their vehicles to bring ammunition, medical supplies and water. Keren tried to convince Amit to lead the men out, but Amit preferred to wait until morning. Eventually, he agreed to send the men in small groups. Keren objected, saying that they must move in one group in order to be able to carry the wounded and defend themselves if attacked. Hisdai also asked Amit to move. Gonen also spoke to Amit and, having heard his explanation, told Keren to make a rescue attempt in the morning. Keren called Adan, who called Gonen and told him that a rescue attempt would be too costly. Gonen then called Amit back and told him to leave on foot. The exchange went on for four hours. After Amit was convinced, Gonen found the location on an enlarged air photo of Suez and planned an artillery box in the center of which Amit could move. He asked Amit to take out a pen and paper, looked at the air photo and dictated to him the route out. Halfway through, Amit stopped writing, deciding that the route would be tough even by day and with a map, and that the area south of the building, through which Gonen's route was to pass, was filled with Egyptian troops. Despite that, he kept answering "Yes sir", and asked for artillery bombardment around the police station, although not in the rest of the city, where Amit preferred to move quietly. He organized his men into squads so that each squad would carry three wounded men. The squads were ordered to keep distance but not lose eye contact. As they were getting ready to move, lookouts reported activity in the nearby buildings and said Egyptian troops had taken positions down the street. Amit ordered all his men back into the building.

The paratroopers concluded that they would not be rescued, and that the Egyptians would not take prisoners. Some of them contemplated committing suicide before the Egyptians broke in. At 2:00 am, Gonen called, asked for Amit, and ordered him "Move out. Report implementation in ten minutes. Out". Amit woke Yoffe up and Yoffe agreed that moving out would be the best solution. Yoffe got up and tried to make a few steps before saying "I can't walk". Other wounded men got up to see if they could. Amit ordered his men out, two of whom had to be carried out on stretchers, while some had to be supported by others. They came out under artillery cover, with the leading squad not carrying any wounded. They did not follow Gonen's route, instead opting to go north across the broad avenue and then turn left on a parallel side street. They could not move quietly because of broken glass and other debris. Egyptian soldiers passed by several times, occasionally passing through gaps in the column, but did not challenge them, perhaps believing they were Egyptians. After almost two hours, they reached the Sweetwater Canal, outside the area under Egyptian control. They followed its inner face toward a vehicular bridge marked on the map, but a few score yards before it they reached a railroad bridge, which did not appear on the map. They could hear that the vehicular bridge was guarded by Egyptians, but the railroad bridge was not and they crossed it. Shortly before dawn, they reached Keren's force outside the city.

== Aftermath ==
The IDF casualties in the battle were 80 dead and 120 wounded. Israel made two more probes into Suez, one on the 25th and one on the 28th, but both were repulsed. On the 28th the UN observers were taking positions west of Suez. The Egyptian Chief of Staff, Saad El Shazly, noted that on October 27, the Israelis refused to let the UN Emergency Force contingent into Suez, and also blocked an Egyptian column of 109 trucks and 20 ambulances. The battle of Suez was the last major battle of the war. When the ceasefire came into effect on October 24, two divisions under the command of Adan and Magen were sealing off the Third Army. The IDF was also holding a corridor on the east bank of the Suez Canal, with three bridges across it, and occupying an area of 1,600 square kilometers inside Egypt as far south as Adabia. On October 28, Israel accepted the ceasefire.
