= Suez =

Capital of the Suez Governorate, Egypt

Suez السويس
- City
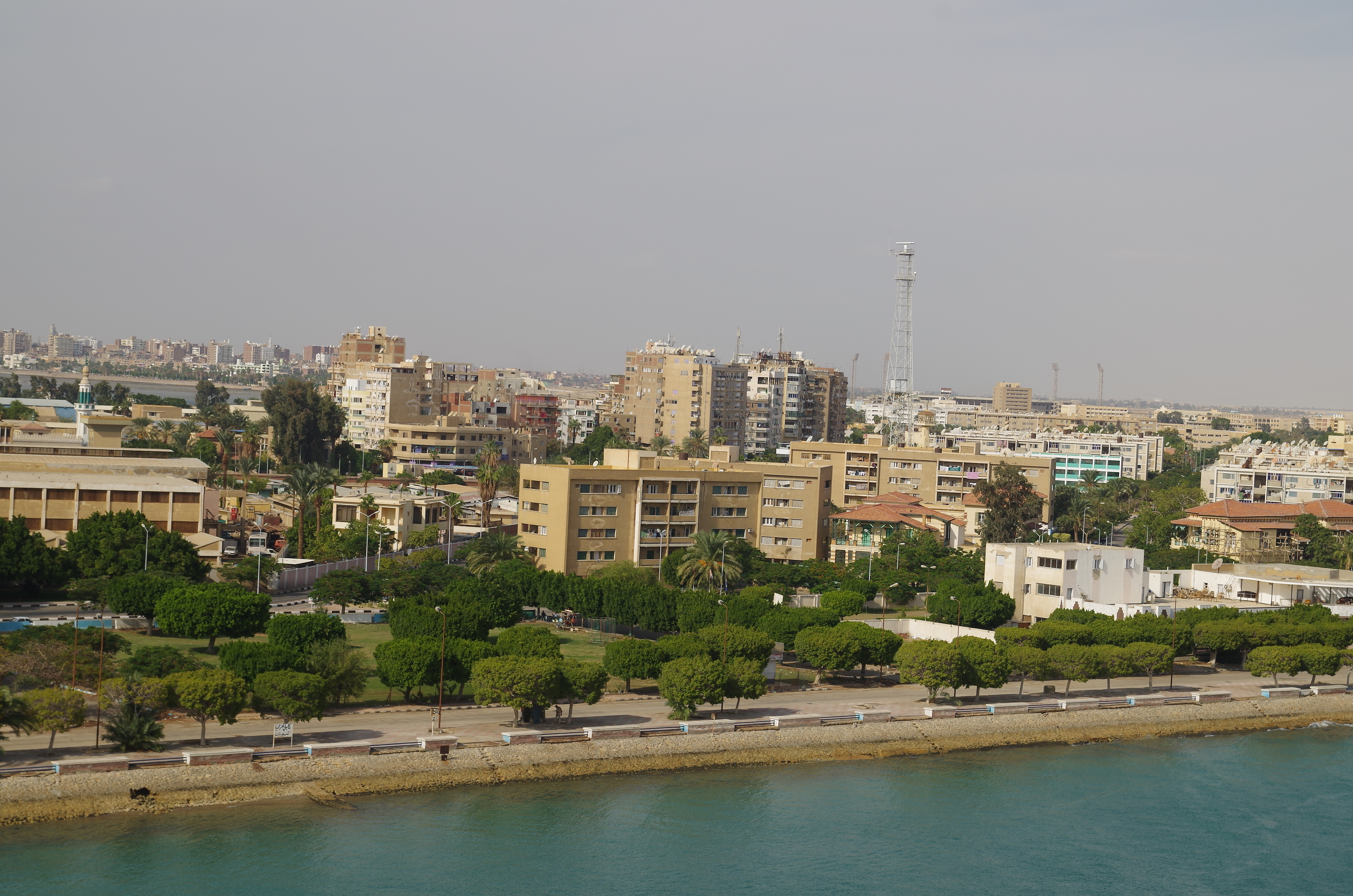
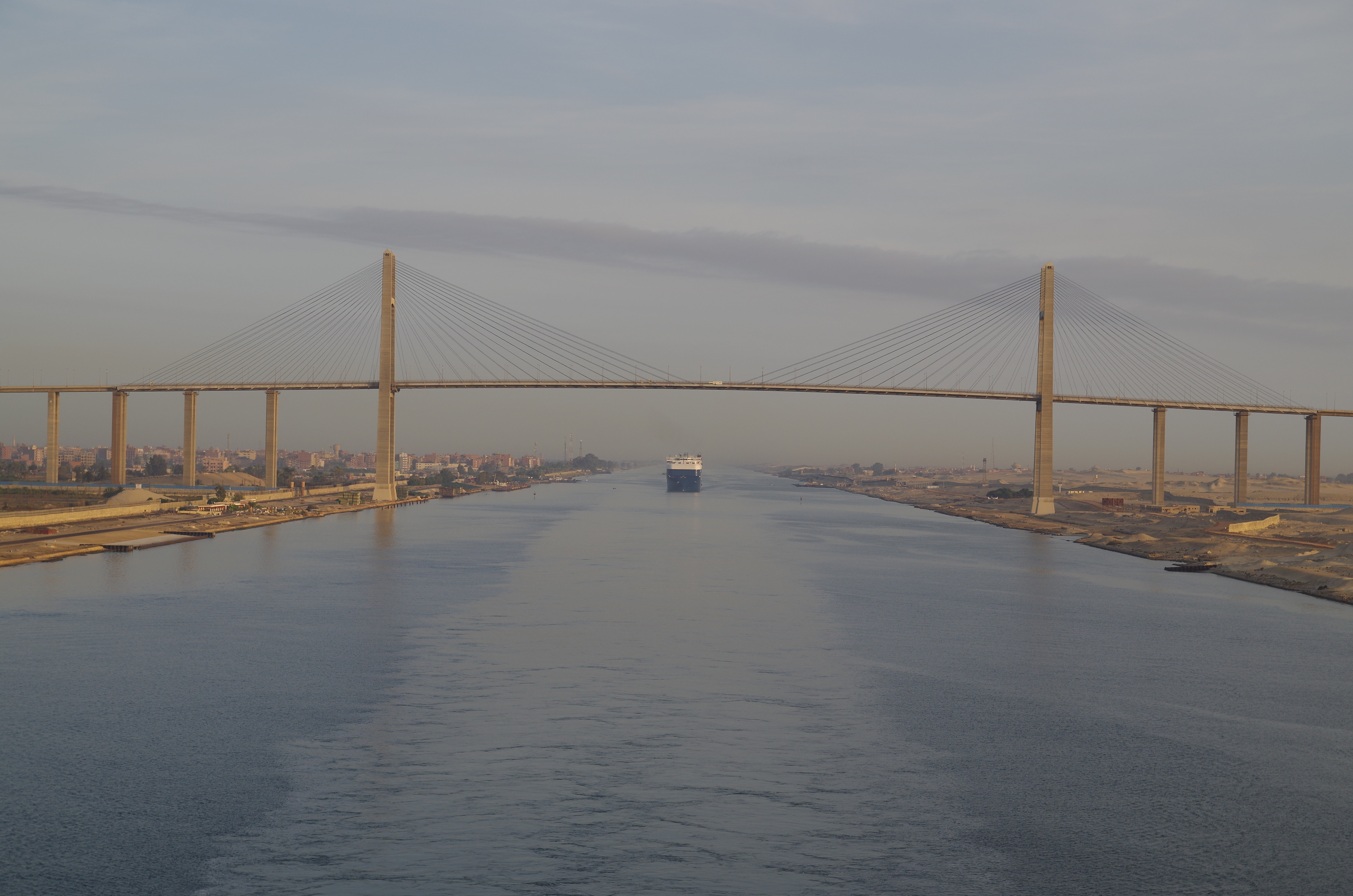
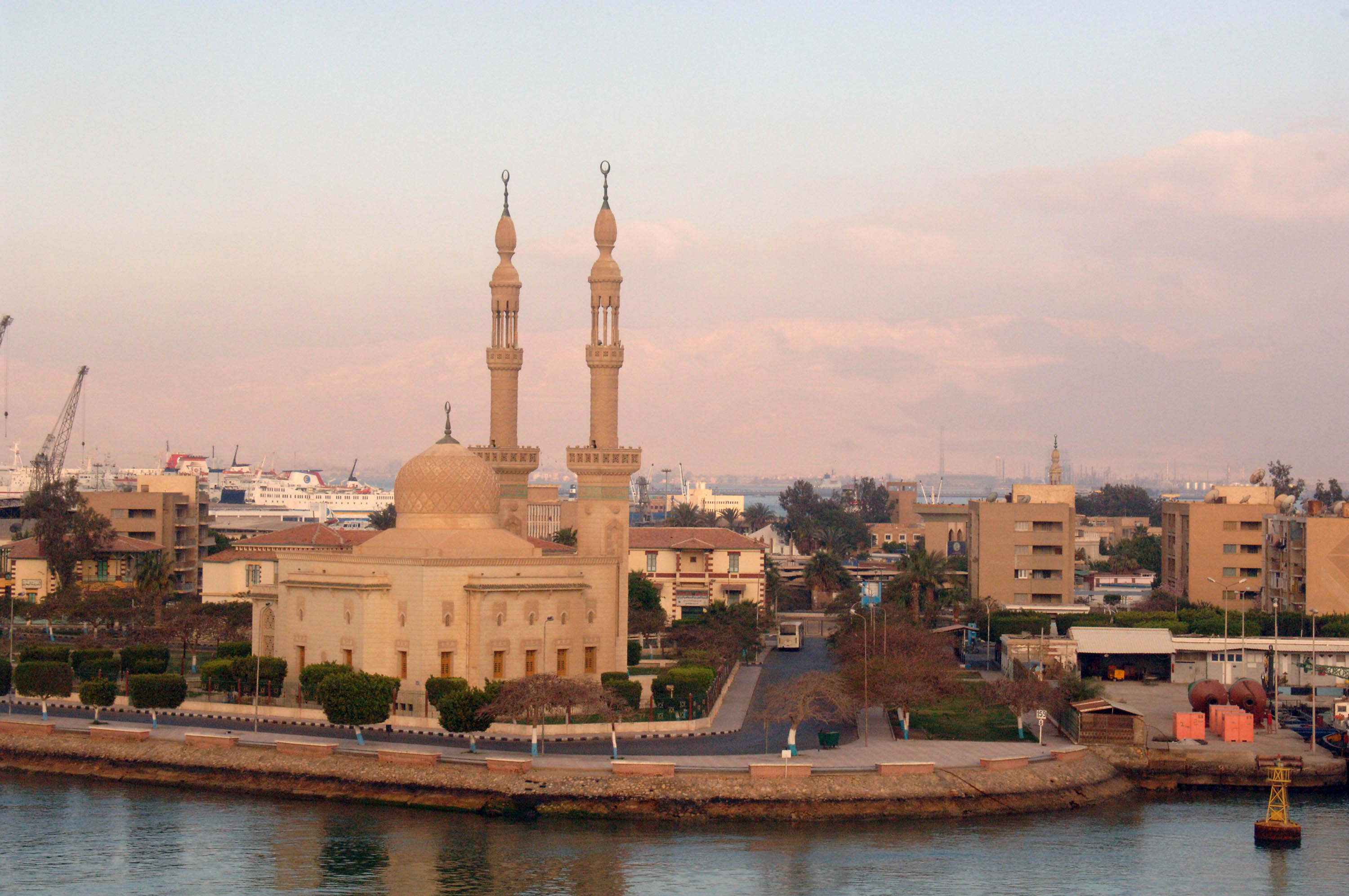
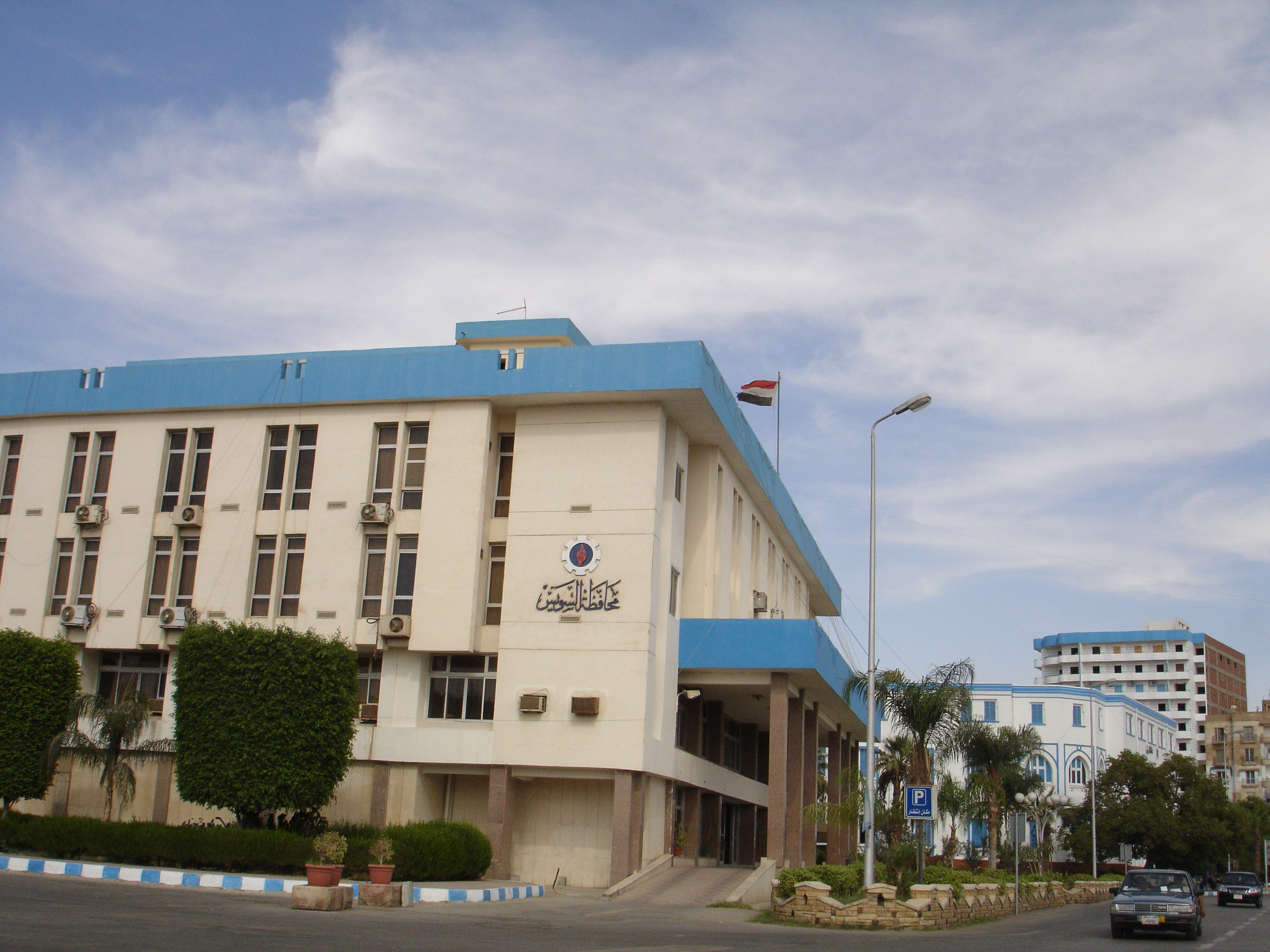
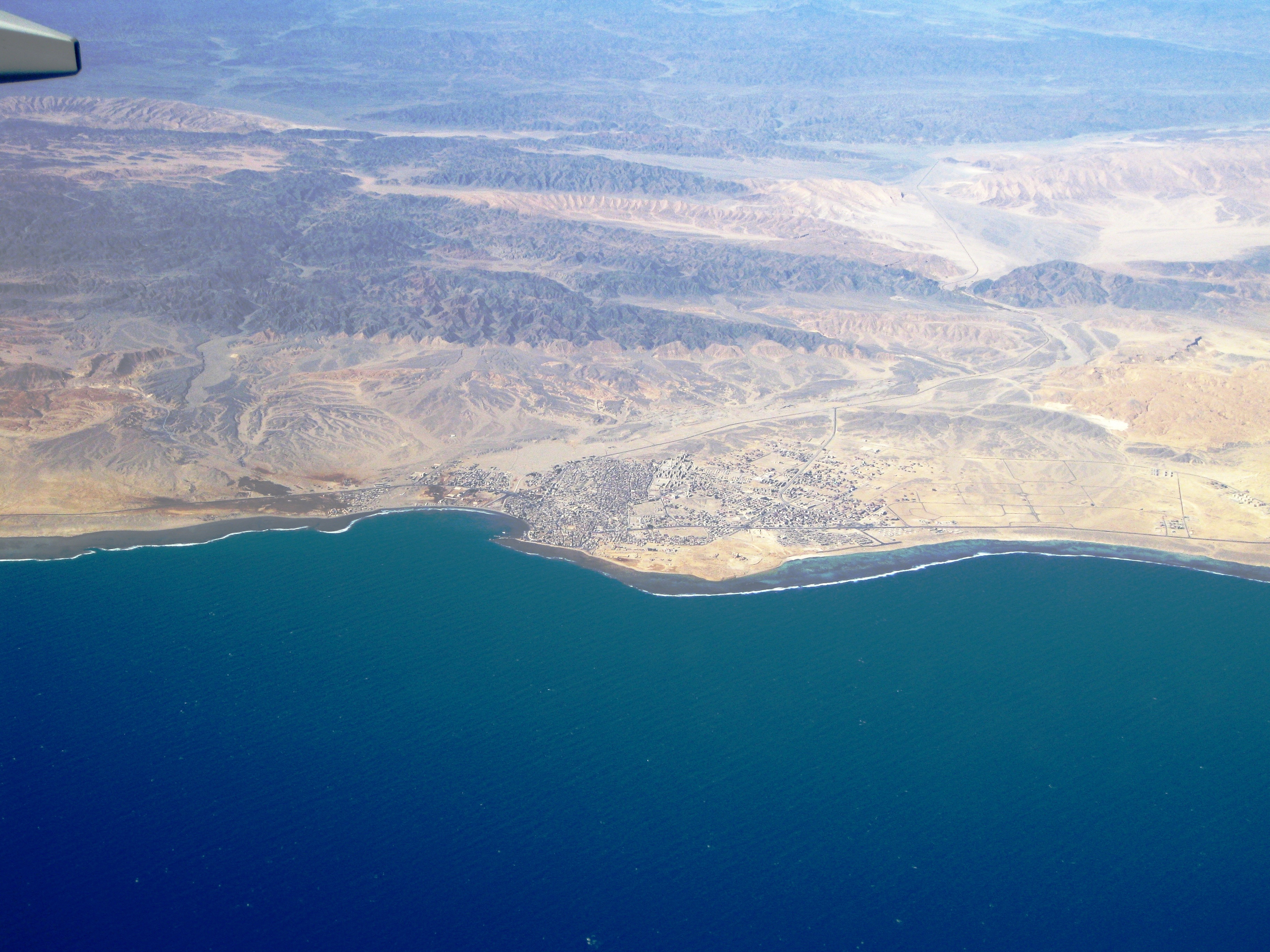
- View of the city shores Suez Canal Bridge Waterfront Suez city hall Gulf of Suez

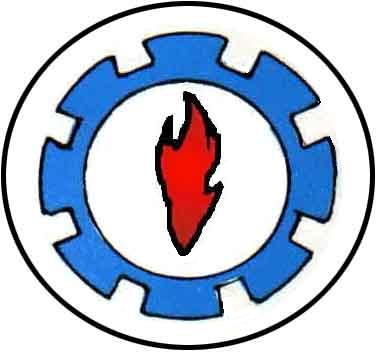
- Flag Seal

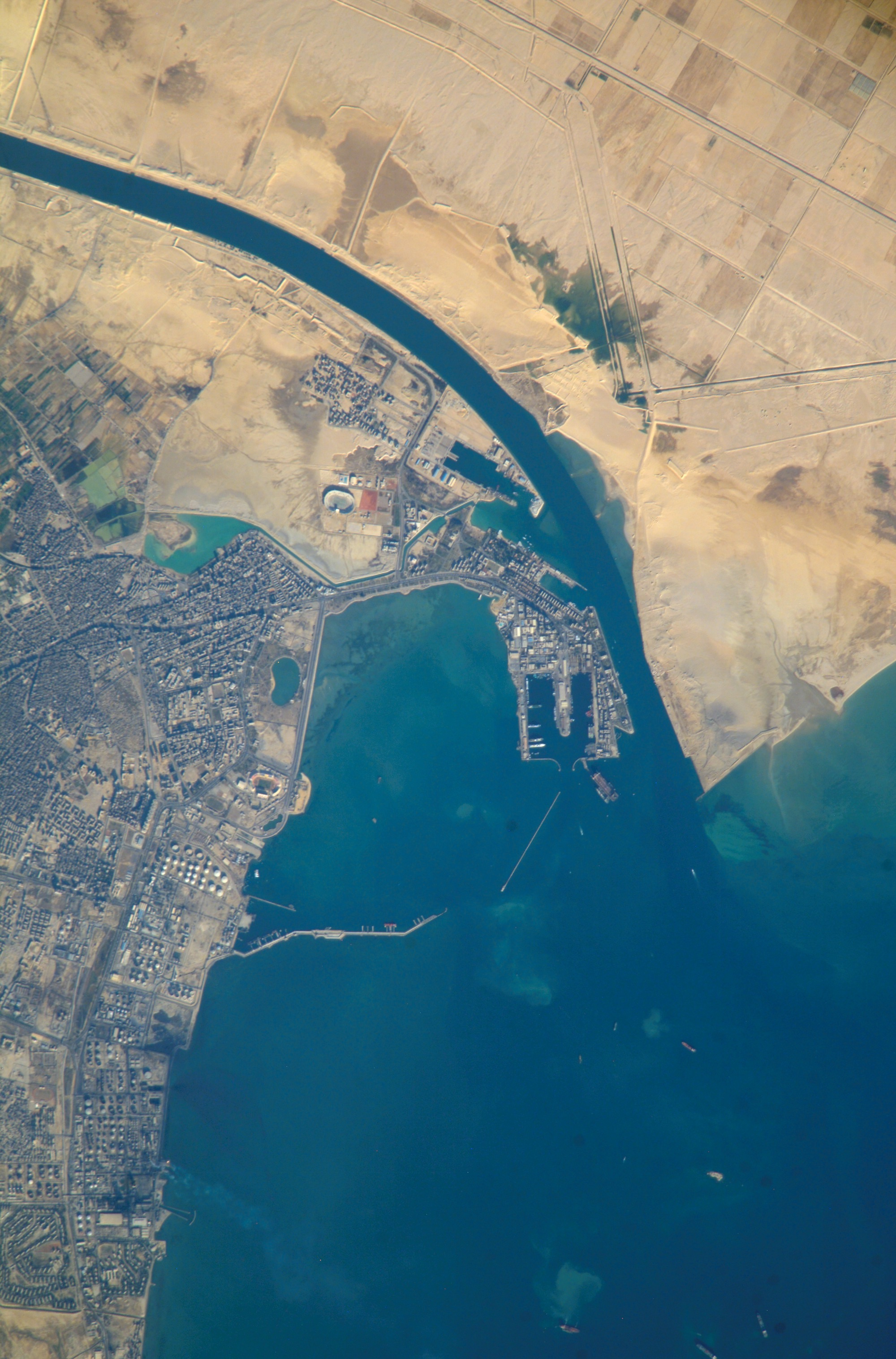
- Satellite view of the port and city, the southern terminus of the Suez Canal that transits through Egypt and debouches into the Mediterranean Sea near Port Said. (Up is north-east).

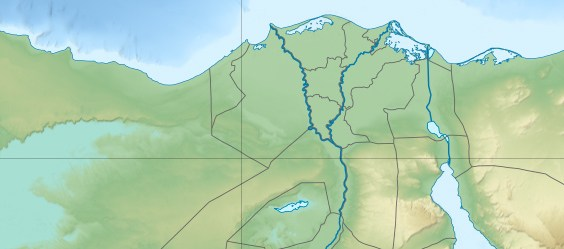
- Location in Egypt Suez (Lower Egypt) Suez (Africa)
- Coordinates: 29°58′N 32°33′E
- Country: Egypt
- Governorate: Suez
- Founded: 1859

Government
  - Governor: Abdel Mageed Saqr

Area
  - Total: 3,128 km^{2} (1,208 sq mi)
- Elevation: 11 m (36 ft)

Population (2024)
  - Total: 690,000
  - Density: 220/km^{2} (570/sq mi)

GDP (nominal, constant 2015 values)
  - Year: 2024
  - Total: $3.6 billion
  - Per capita: $5,217
- Time zone: UTC+3 (EET)
  - Summer (DST): UTC+3 (EEST)
- Postal code: 43511
- Website: Suez.gov.eg

Suez is a seaport city in north-eastern Egypt, located on the north coast of the Gulf of Suez on the Red Sea, near the southern terminus of the Suez Canal. The city is the capital and largest city of the Suez Governorate. The modern city of Suez is a successor of the ancient Egyptian city of Clysma, a major Red Sea port and a center of monasticism.

Railway lines and highways connect the city with Cairo, Port Said, and Ismailia. Suez has a petrochemical plant, and its oil refineries have pipelines carrying the finished product to Cairo. These are represented in the flag of the governorate: the blue background refers to the sea, the gear refers to Suez's status as an industrial governorate, and the flame refers to the petroleum firms of Suez. The city has three ports: the Suez Port (Port Tewfik), al-Adabiya, and al-Zaytiya, and extensive port facilities. Together, the three cities form the Suez metropolitan area, located mostly in Africa with a small portion in Asia.

== Etymology ==
The city's name is derived from a fuʿayl form of the Arabic word for 'liquorice' (Arabic: سُوس, romanized: sūs).

== History ==
=== Achaemenid era ===
Darius the Great's Suez Inscriptions were texts written in Old Persian, Elamite, Babylonian and Egyptian on five monuments erected in Wadi Tumilat, commemorating the opening of a canal between the Nile and the Bitter Lakes, to facilitate a shipping connection between Egypt, then a satrapy of the Achaemenid Empire, and Persia (i.e. the greater portion of the Empire itself).

==== Text of the Suez Inscriptions ====
Partial transliteration and translation of the inscription:

Transliteration of the Old Persian text: xâmanišiya \ thâtiy \ Dârayavauš \ XŠ \ adam \ Pârsa \ amiy \ hacâ \ Pâ rsâ \ Mudrâyam \ agarbâyam \ adam \ niyaštâyam \ imâm \ yauviyâ m \ katanaiy \ hacâ \ Pirâva \ nâma \ rauta \ tya \ Mudrâyaiy \ danuvatiy \ ab iy \ draya \ tya \ hacâ \ Pârsâ \ aitiy \ pasâva \ iyam \ yauviyâ \ akaniya \ avathâ \ yathâ \ adam \ niyaštâyam \ utâ \ nâva \ âyatâ \ hacâ \ Mudrâ yâ \ tara \ imâm \ yauviyâm \ abiy \ Pârsam \ avathâ \ yathâ \ mâm \ kâma\ âha

English translation: "King Darius says: I am a Persian; setting out from Persia I conquered Egypt. I ordered to dig this canal from the river that is called Nile and flows in Egypt, to the sea that begins in Persia. Therefore, when this canal had been dug as I had ordered, ships went from Egypt through this canal to Persia, as I had intended."

=== Early Islamic era ===
In the 7th century AD a town named "Kolzum" stood just north of the site of present-day Suez and served as eastern terminus of a canal built by Amr ibn al-'As, linking the Nile River and the Red Sea. Kolzum's trade fell following the closure of the canal in 770 by the second Abbasid caliph, al-Mansur, to prevent his enemies in Arabia from accessing supplies from Egypt and the lands north of it. Nonetheless, the town benefited from the trade that remained between Egypt and Arabia. By 780 al-Mansur's successor al-Mahdi restored part of the canal. The Qarmatians led by al-Hasan al-A'sam defeated a Fatimid army headed by Jawhar al-Siqilli at Kolzum in 971 and thereby captured the town. Following his defeat in Cairo by al-Siqilli at the end of that year, Hasan and his forces retreated to Arabia via Kolzum. Suez was situated nearby and served as a source of drinking water for Kolzum, according to the Arab traveler al-Muqaddasi, who visited in 986.

The Ayyubid sultan of Egypt, Saladin, fortified both Kolzum and Suez in order to defend Egypt's eastern frontier from Crusader raids by Raynald of Chatillon. Between 1183 and 1184, Raynald had ships stationed in the Red Sea to prevent the Ayyubid garrison at Kolzum from accessing water. In response, Saladin's brother al-Adil had Husam ad-Din Lu'lu' build a naval fleet, which sailed to the southern port of Aidab to end Raynald's venture. By the 13th century, it was recorded that Kolzum was in ruins, as was Suez, which had gradually replaced the former as a population center. According to Muslim historians al-Maqrizi and al-Idrisi, Kolzum had once been a prosperous town, until it was occupied and plundered by Bedouins. Arab geographer al-Dimashqi noted that Kolzum belonged to the Mamluk province of al-Karak at the time.

=== Ottoman and Egyptian rule ===
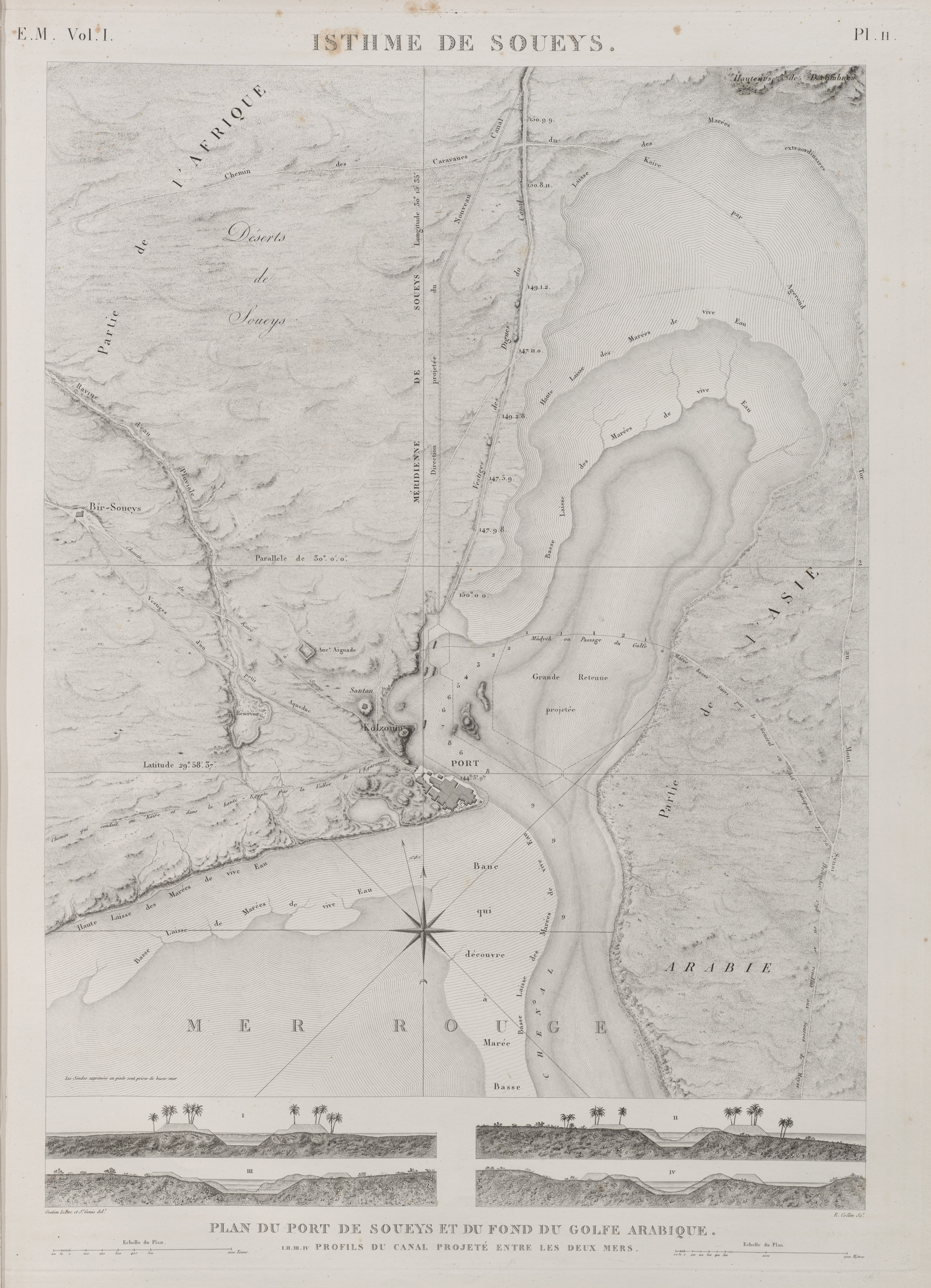
c.1800 French map of the "Isthmus of Suez"; the port area shown on the map is c.10km south of the modern city of Suez and is uninhabited today.

To prevent Portuguese attacks against Egyptian coastal towns and the Red Sea port of Jeddah, Qansuh al-Ghawri, the last Mamluk sultan, ordered a 6,000-man force headed by Selman Reis to defend Suez in 1507, which in turn limited the Mamluk military's capabilities against the Ottomans in the Mediterranean Sea. Following the Ottoman conquest of Egypt at the beginning of the 16th century, Suez became both a major naval and trading station. The Ottoman fleets at Suez were instrumental in disputing control over Indian Ocean trade with the Portuguese. in the Red Sea in the 16th & 17th century. Campaigns against the Ottoman Empire. Yellow - Factories ( Mokha) Red - Allied Territorie or under influence. Dark Green - Campaigns of Adal.

==== Portuguese attacks ====
In trying to limit the Ottoman Navy to the Red Sea, after the siege of Diu in 1538, a Portuguese fleet was sent in 1541 to seek out and destroy the Ottoman navy. After capturing El Tor on the Egyptian coast, the fleet's commander Estevão da Gama gave the order to attack Suez, but failed to engage the Ottoman fleet as the Ottomans had received intelligence about the incoming attack beforehand. Instead, the Portuguese fleet spent the next 7 months in the Red Sea sailing from port to port and waiting in Massawa before eventually leaving for India.

German explorer Carsten Niebuhr noted that in the 18th century a 20-strong fleet sailed annually from Suez to Jeddah, which served both as Mecca's port and Egypt's gateway for trade with India. However, by the French invasion of Egypt and Syria in 1798, Suez had once again devolved into an unimportant town. Fighting between French and Ottoman troops in 1800 left most of the town in ruins. Its importance as a port increased after the Suez Canal opened in 1869.

=== Modern era ===
The city was virtually destroyed during battles in the late 1960s and early 1970s between Egyptian and Israeli forces occupying the Sinai Peninsula. The town was deserted following the Six-Day War in 1967. Avraham Adan tried to capture the city but failed, costing the Israeli Defence Forces (IDF) 80 troops killed, 120 wounded, and 40 tanks destroyed. Reconstruction of Suez began soon after Egypt reopened the Suez Canal following the Yom Kippur War with Israel.

Suez was the first city to hold major protests against the government of Hosni Mubarak during the 2011 Egyptian revolution and was the scene of the first fatality of that uprising. On account of this, it has been called the Sidi Bouzid of Egypt, recalling that small town's role in the 2010–2011 Tunisian revolution.

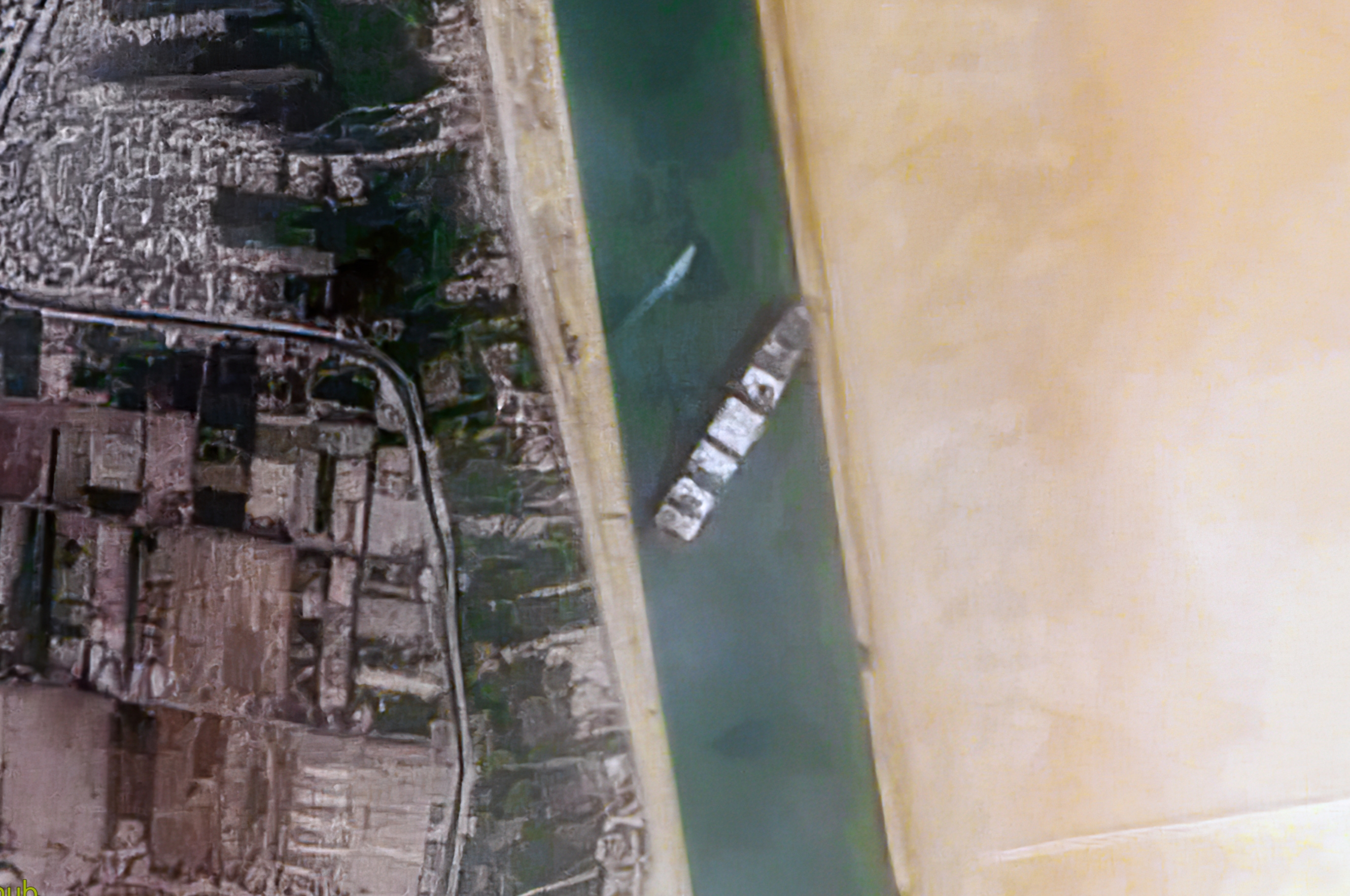
Obstruction at Suez; a container ship got stuck in March 2021

In 2021, the container ship Ever Given became stuck across the Suez canal near Suez. This came to be known as the 2021 Suez Canal obstruction.

== Administration ==
The city is divided into five main districts:

=== El Arbaeen District ===
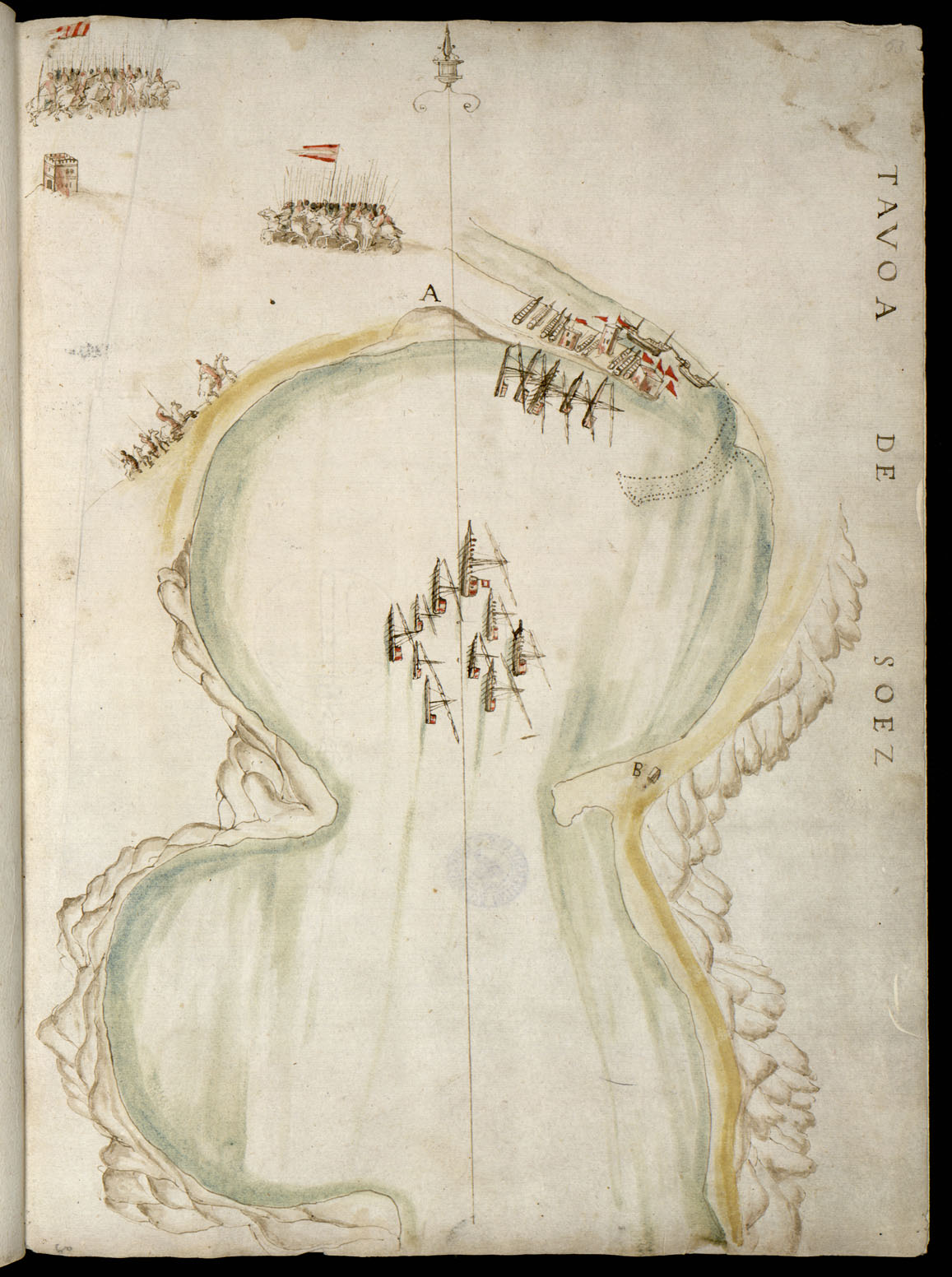
Suez, in 1541 in drawing by Dom João de Castro ( Roteiro do Mar Roxo)

The most populous district of the city, it has most of the government buildings and public institutions. It also has the city's main fruit and vegetable markets in addition to other markets and stores selling various commodities.

=== Suez District ===
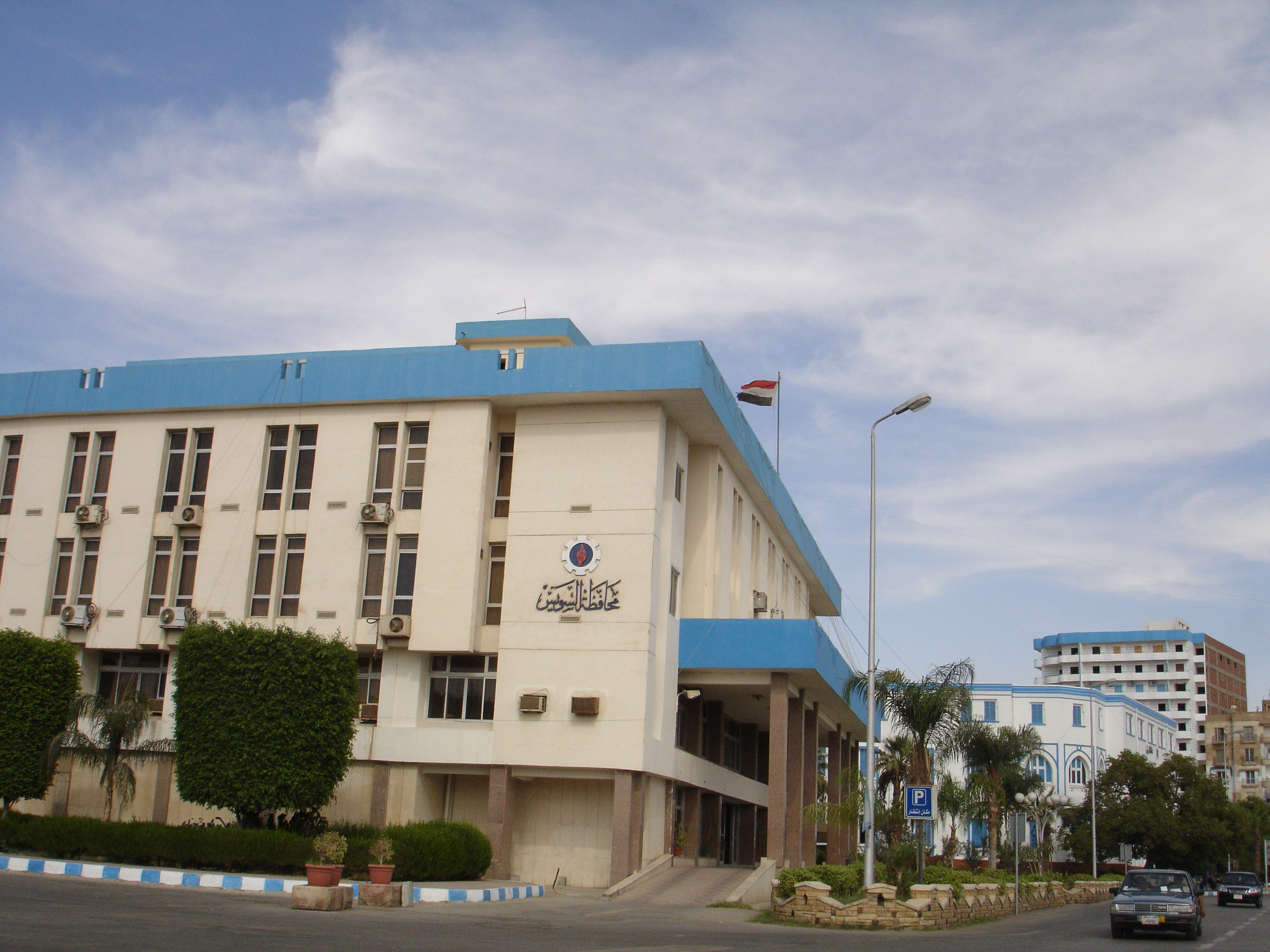
Suez Governorate city hall

Suez district is considered the most affluent area in the city. The real estate there is significantly more expensive than any other district in the city. Its buildings have more modern architectural style than those in the El Arbaeen District. It includes the affluent neighbourhood of Port Tawfik, which directly overlooks the Suez Canal. Port Tawfik includes some old-style houses that date back to the era of English occupation. The district also includes two of Egypt's most important oil refineries; El-Nasr Petroleum Company and Suez Petroleum Company. Also, Suez Port, one of Egypt's main ports, lies within the perimeter of Suez District.

=== El Ganayen District ===
This district stretches all the way to the border with Ismailia Governorate and contains the entire Asian territory of the city. It has all the rural areas of the city and can be thought of as the city's "countryside".

=== Faisal District ===
It includes the newer neighbourhoods of the city. Most of the areas at Faisal District were established after the 1973 Yom Kippur war, which had destroyed vast areas of the city. Examples of neighborhoods in Faisal District include Al-Sabbah, Al-Amal and Al-Mushi, to name a few.

=== Ataqah District ===
It is characterised by the existence of many industrial areas. There are plants and factories specialising in fertilisers, cement, steel, cooking oil, flour products, oil rigs, ceramic tiles, sugar, and many other products. There is also the Attaka Power Plant.

The district also includes Ain Sokhna, one of Egypt's most important sea resorts, overlooking the Gulf of Suez. Ain Sokhna has numerous high-class sea resorts and is frequented by many tourists, Egyptians and foreigners, all over the year due to its warm weather. The district is home to the Ain Sokhna Sea Port, one of Egypt's main sea ports operated by the Dubai-based DP World Company and the Al-Ataka Fishing Port, which is the city's main fish production port.

== Suez Canal ==
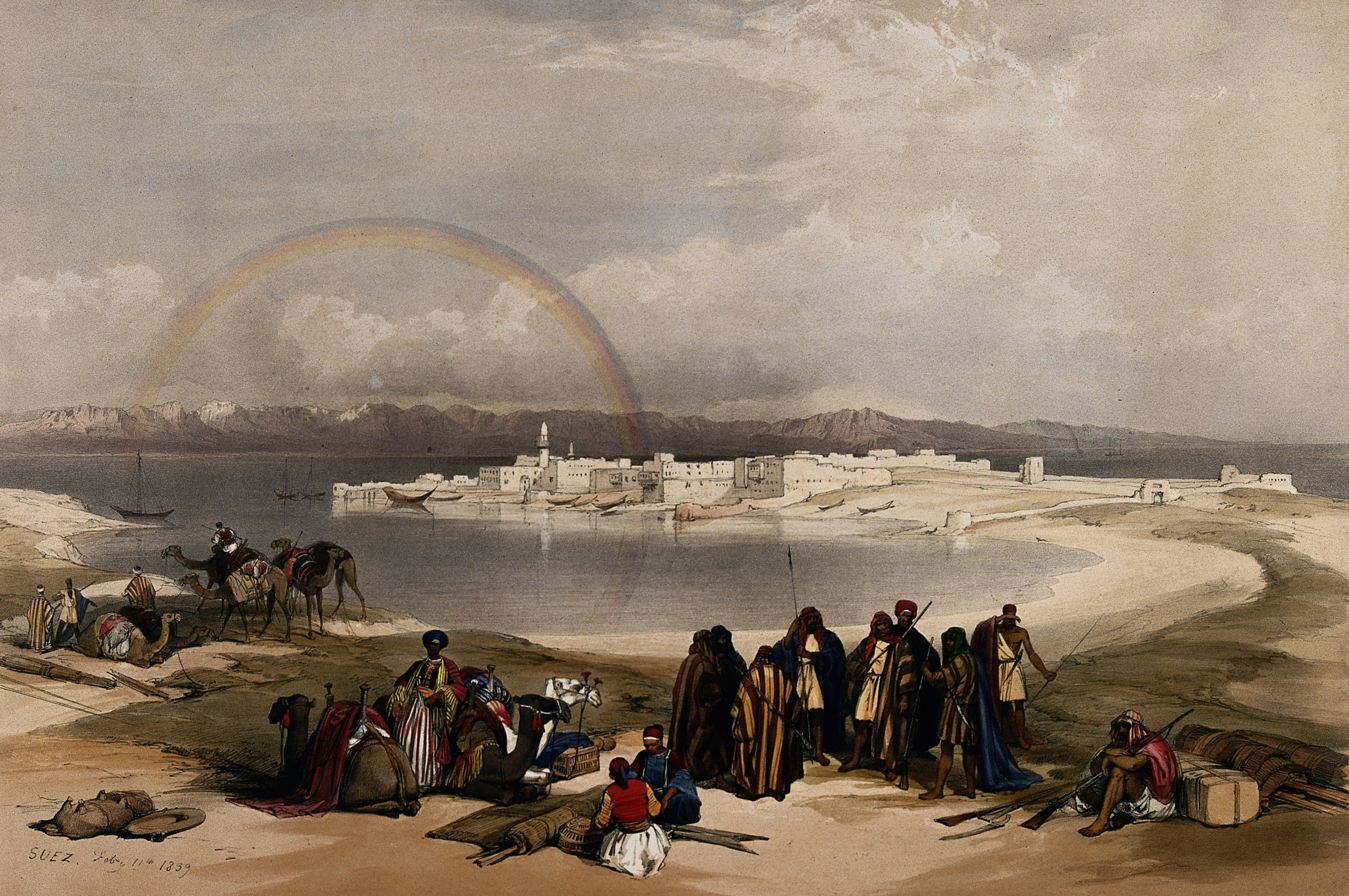
Suez, 1839; A lithograph by David Roberts, in The Holy Land, Syria, Idumea, Arabia, Egypt, and Nubia

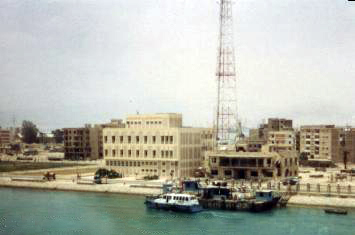
View of Suez from the canal in 1982

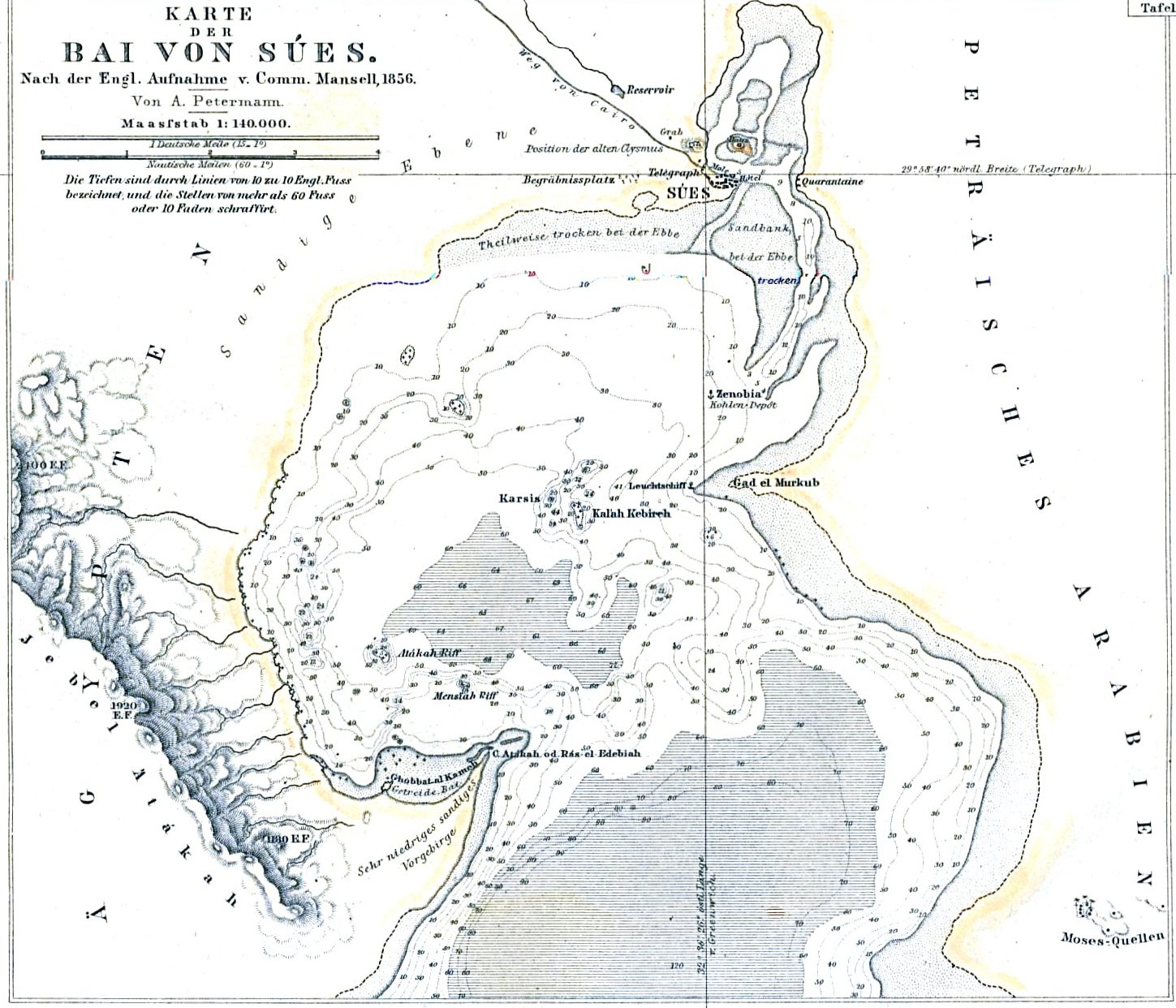
Northernmost part of Gulf of Suez with town Suez on map of 1856

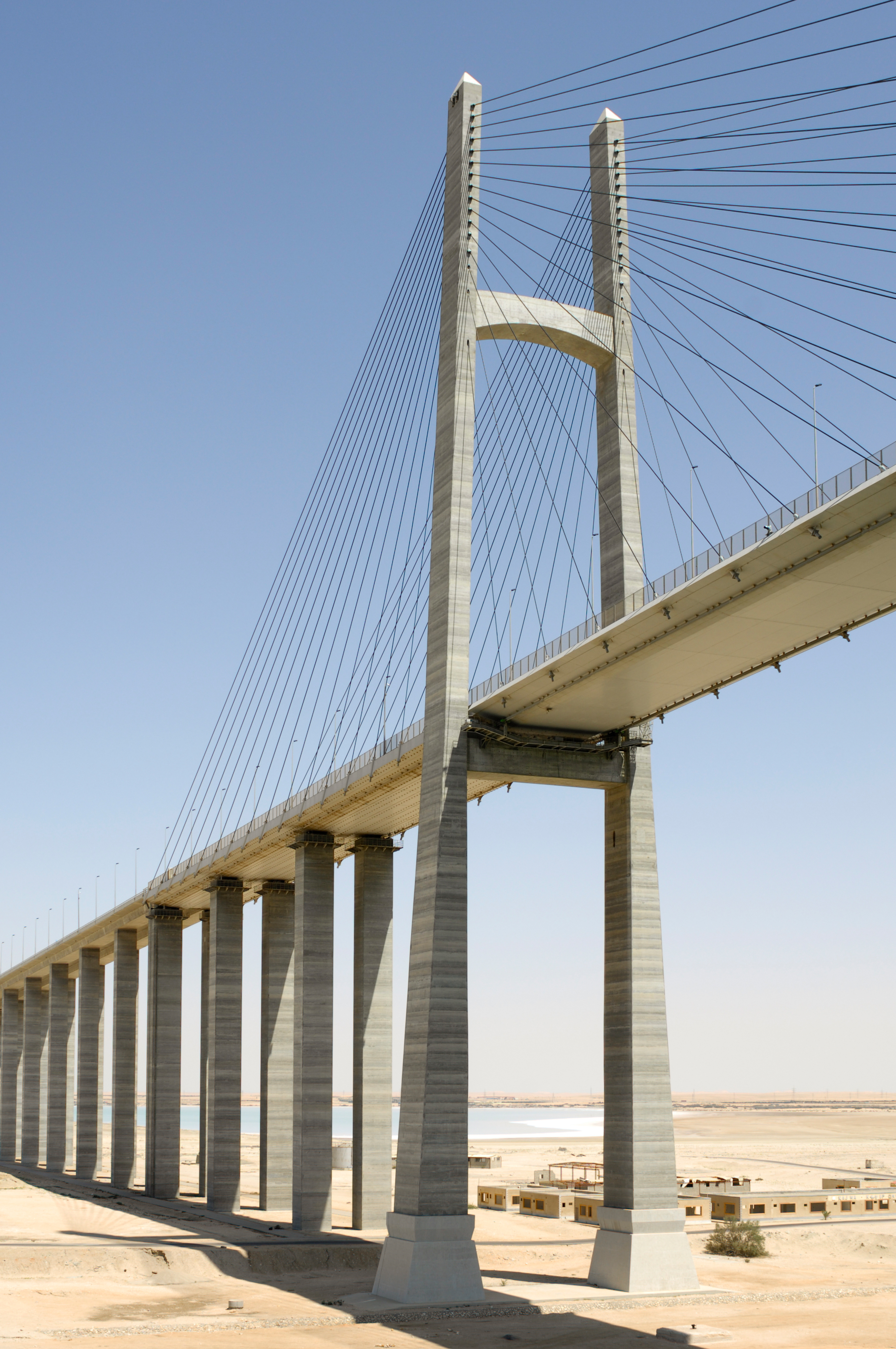
Detail view of one of the main pylons.

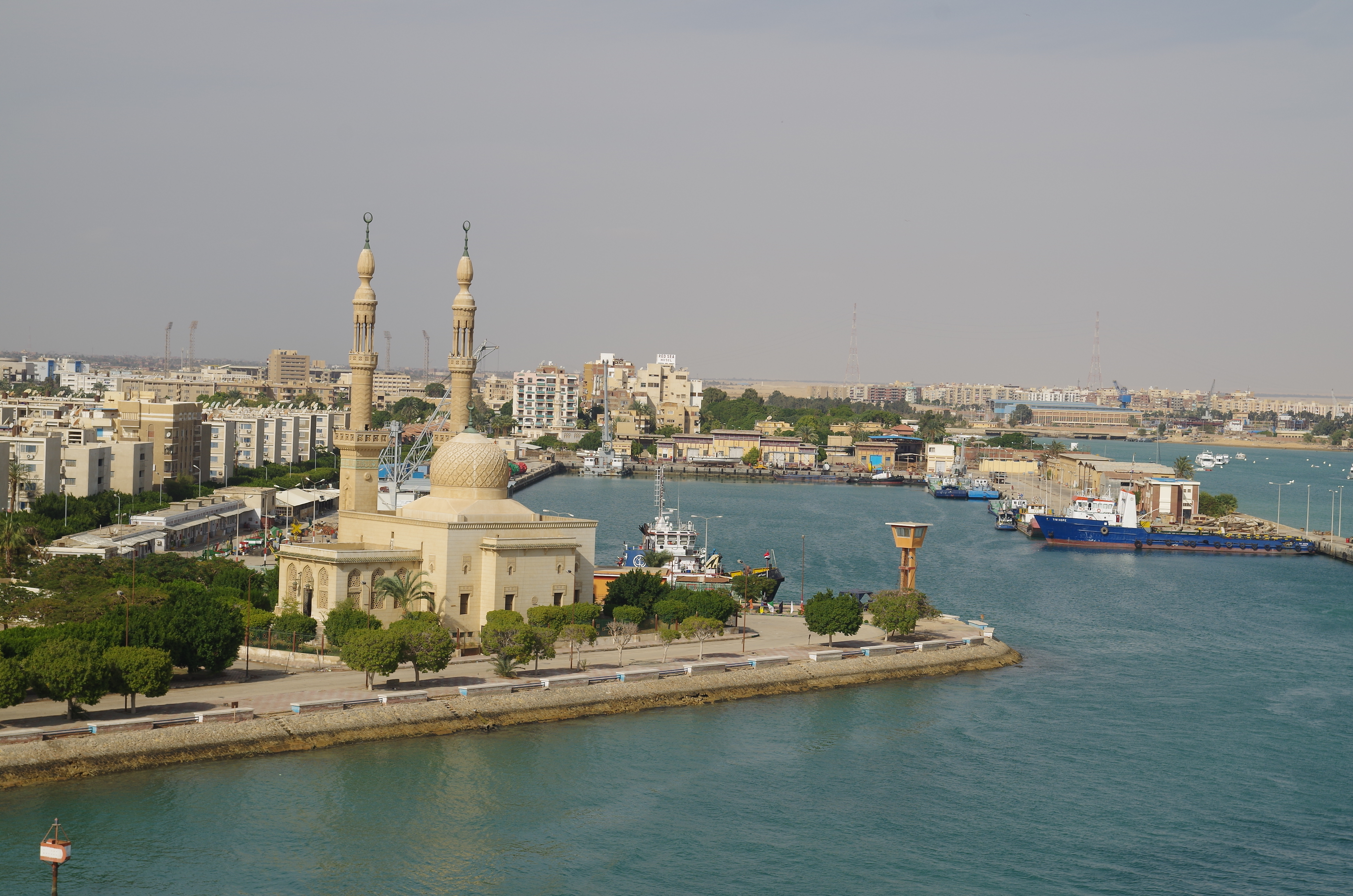
Suez Canal shoreline

In ancient times, there was a canal from the Nile delta to the Gulf of Suez, when the gulf extended further north than it does today. This canal fell into disuse, and the present canal was built in the nineteenth century.

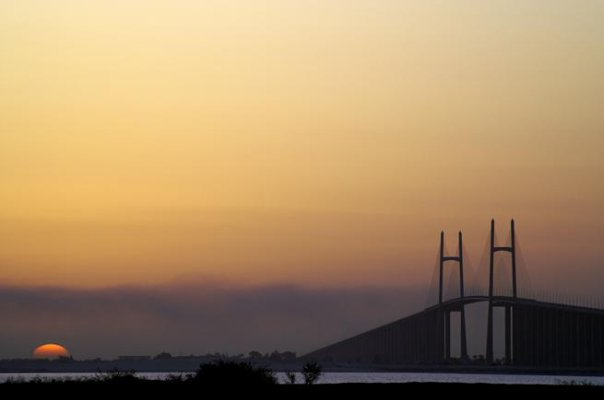
Sunset view from land to Suez Canal Bridge, which links Africa with Asia

The Suez Canal offers a significantly shorter passage for ships, as compared to passing round the Cape of Good Hope. The construction of the Suez Canal was favoured by the natural conditions of the region: the comparatively short distance between the Mediterranean and the Red Sea, the occurrence of a line of lakes or depressions which became lakes (Lake Manzala in the north, and depressions, Timsah and the Bitter Lakes, part way along the route), and the generally flat terrain. The construction of the canal was proposed by the engineer and French diplomat Ferdinand de Lesseps, who in 1854 acquired from Said Pasha the rights of constructing and operating the canal for a period of 99 years. The Compagnie Universelle du Canal Maritime de Suez was formed. Construction took 11 years, and the canal opened on 17 November 1869. The canal had an immediate and dramatic effect on world trade.

In July 1956, just a few days after the fourth anniversary of the Egyptian Revolution of 1952, the Egyptian government under President Gamal Abdel Nasser nationalised the Suez Canal Company, which had been run by the French and owned privately, with the British as the largest shareholders. In 1956, Israeli, British and French forces invaded the Suez Canal, which became known as the Suez Crisis. Following Israel's invasion and occupation of the Sinai Peninsula in the Six-Day War of 1967, the Canal was closed, and did not reopen until 1975.

On March 23, 2021, a container ship called the Ever Given ran aground in the canal and blocked it.

Today, the Canal is a vital link in world trade, and contributes significantly to the Egyptian economy; in 2009 the income generated from the canal accounted for 3.7% of Egypt's GDP.

== Geography ==
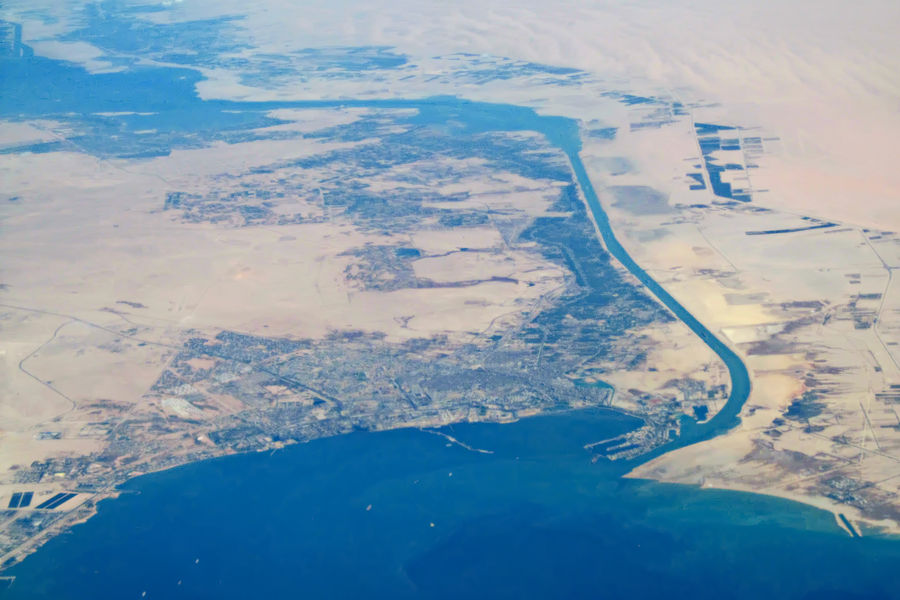
Aerial view of Suez and Suez Canal

The Isthmus of Suez is considered the boundary between Africa and Asia.

=== Climate ===
Köppen-Geiger climate classification system classifies its climate as a hot desert (BWh).

The hottest recorded temperature was 49 °C (120 °F) on June 14, 1965 while the coldest recorded temperature was 1 °C (34 °F) on February 23, 2004. The city receives 3338 sunshine hours a year on average. During the transitional months especially the spring, the city can experience a strong Khamsin wind causing sudden, but short lasting temperature spikes often exceeding 35 °C (95 °F) or even 40 °C (104 °F) in extreme cases.

Climate data for Suez (1991–2020)
Month	Jan	Feb	Mar	Apr	May	Jun	Jul	Aug	Sep	Oct	Nov	Dec	Year
Record high °C (°F)	29.4 (84.9)	39.0 (102.2)	38.6 (101.5)	41.7 (107.1)	45.3 (113.5)	46.2 (115.2)	44.5 (112.1)	43.8 (110.8)	42.4 (108.3)	39.4 (102.9)	35.1 (95.2)	30.0 (86.0)	46.2 (115.2)
Mean daily maximum °C (°F)	19.4 (66.9)	20.8 (69.4)	23.4 (74.1)	28.3 (82.9)	32.5 (90.5)	35.7 (96.3)	36.8 (98.2)	36.7 (98.1)	34.6 (94.3)	30.7 (87.3)	25.4 (77.7)	21.0 (69.8)	28.8 (83.8)
Daily mean °C (°F)	14.4 (57.9)	15.5 (59.9)	17.8 (64.0)	22.0 (71.6)	25.9 (78.6)	29.0 (84.2)	30.4 (86.7)	30.6 (87.1)	28.7 (83.7)	25.1 (77.2)	20.2 (68.4)	16.0 (60.8)	23.0 (73.4)
Mean daily minimum °C (°F)	9.4 (48.9)	10.1 (50.2)	12.2 (54.0)	15.7 (60.3)	19.3 (66.7)	22.3 (72.1)	23.9 (75.0)	24.4 (75.9)	22.8 (73.0)	19.5 (67.1)	15.1 (59.2)	11.0 (51.8)	17.1 (62.8)
Record low °C (°F)	3.6 (38.5)	4.2 (39.6)	5.2 (41.4)	7.7 (45.9)	11.2 (52.2)	16.0 (60.8)	18.0 (64.4)	18.5 (65.3)	15.0 (59.0)	11.6 (52.9)	6.2 (43.2)	4.4 (39.9)	3.6 (38.5)
Average precipitation mm (inches)	6 (0.2)	4 (0.2)	5 (0.2)	2 (0.1)	1 (0.0)	0 (0)	0 (0)	0 (0)	0 (0)	2 (0.1)	4 (0.2)	5 (0.2)	29 (1.1)
Average precipitation days (≥ 1.0 mm)	1.2	0.8	0.9	0.4	0.2	0.0	0.0	0.0	0.0	0.4	0.7	1.0	5.6
Average relative humidity (%)	63	60	57	51	49	50	54	56	59	62	65	68	56.8
Average dew point °C (°F)	7.3 (45.1)	7.7 (45.9)	8.5 (47.3)	9.5 (49.1)	11.4 (52.5)	15.1 (59.2)	18.0 (64.4)	19.1 (66.4)	18.2 (64.8)	15.3 (59.5)	11.4 (52.5)	8.7 (47.7)	12.7 (54.9)
Source: NOAA

== Twin towns and sister cities ==
Suez is twinned with:

- Djibouti City, Djibouti
- Skopje, North Macedonia

== Notable people ==
- Ismail Yassine (1912-1972), singer, comedian and actor
- Ebrahim Nafae (1934–2018), journalist and a former editor-in-chief of Al-Ahram Newspaper.
- Abdel Latif Moubarak (born 1964), poet
- Youssef Maaty (born 1963), playwright
- haroun alrashid maula

== See also ==
- Attaqa Mountain Pumped Storage Power Plant
- Battle of Suez
- List of cities and towns in Egypt
- Suez University

== Bibliography ==
- "Suez" . Encyclopædia Britannica. Vol. 26 (11th ed.). 1911. p. 22.
- Forgotten Books, The Churches and Monasteries of Egypt and Some Neighbouring Countries, Forgotten Books, ISBN 1440060096
- Houtsma, Martijn Theodoor; Wensinck, A.J. (1993), E.J. Brill's First Encyclopaedia of Islam, 1913-1936, BRILL, ISBN 9004097961
