= Jokaru =

2023 Maldivian film

- Official film poster
- Directed by: Yoosuf Shafeeu
- Written by: Yoosuf Shafeeu
- Screenplay by: Yoosuf Shafeeu
- Produced by: Ismail Shafeeq; Ali Shaniz Mohamed
- Starring: Ahmed Nimal; Sheela Najeeb; Ahmed Saeed; Ali Azim; Nashidha Mohamed
- Cinematography: Shivaz Abdulla
- Edited by: Yoosuf Shafeeu
- Music by: Ayyuman Shareef
- Production companies: Eupe Production; Shy Production; Saturn Studio
- Release date: 5 September 2023
- Country: Maldives
- Language: Dhivehi

Jokaru is a 2023 Maldivian comedy film written and directed by Yoosuf Shafeeu. Produced by Ismail Shafeeq and Ali Shaniz Mohamed under Eupe Production, in association with Shy Production and Saturn Studio, the film stars Ahmed Nimal, Sheela Najeeb, Ahmed Saeed, Ali Azim and Nashidha Mohamed in pivotal roles. The film was released theatrically on 5 September 2023.

== Premise ==
Afreen seeks assistance from the gang leader Sarudhar and his trio of accomplices, Joharu, Kadheeru, and Ruhul, to obtain a suitcase full of money. Afreen provides them with all the necessary information about the suitcase. The trio initiates their mission by enticing Haris, who is carrying the same suitcase and visiting Male', into a taxi. They successfully acquire the suitcase, turning the trip into a harrowing ordeal for the three jesters and anyone else caught up in the chaos.

== Cast ==
- Ahmed Nimal as Sarudhar
- Sheela Najeeb as Bareeka
- Ahmed Saeed as Kadheeru
- Ali Azim as Joharu
- Nashidha Mohamed as Mahira
- Moosa Rasheed as Saadh
- Hussain Nadhuvee as Maaz
- Mohamed Rifshan as Aaf
- Ahmed Emau as Ruhul
- Moosa Aleef as Afreen
- Hamdhan Farooq as Haris
- Shaheedha Ahmed as Dhuha
- Fathimath Fareela in the item number "Vagunge Jagadaa"
- Yoosuf Shafeeu in the item number "Vagunge Jagadaa"

== Development ==
After the success of the comedy films Baiveriyaa (2016), Naughty 40 (2017) and 40+, director Yoosuf Shafeeu collaborated with producer Ismail Shafeeq for another comedy film titled Jokaru. The project was officially announced on 11 July 2023, even though some filming sequences of the film were published on social media starting from May 2023. Major cast of the film were announced in July 2023 with actors including Ahmed Nimal, Sheela Najeeb, Ahmed Saeed, Ali Azim and debutants Ahmed Emau, Moosa Aleef and Shaheedha Ahmed. Initial snippets of the film was released in mid-July 2023 indicating that the film revolves around a box which is deeply connected to everyone's life and how everyone is invested in finding the missing box. Filming took place in the greater Male' area.

== Soundtrack ==
Track listing
No.	Title	Lyrics	Music	Singer(s)	Length
1.	"Vagunge Jagadaa"	Mohamed Abdul Ghanee	Hassan Jalaal	Mariyam Ashfa, Hassan Tholaq

== Release ==
The film theatrically released on 5 September 2023.

The film received mixed reviews from critics. Aminath Luba from The Press called it a "laughing riot" and praised the performance of veteran actors including Ahmed Nimal and debut actor Moosa Aleef. Luba noted the "lagging" first half of the film and the "over-humor" as a drawback of the film.

== Accolades ==
Award	Category	Recipients	Result	Ref.
1st MSPA Film Awards	Best Debut – Male	Mohamed Emau	Nominated	
