= Hayyaru =

Maldivian web series

- Screenplay by: Yoosuf Shafeeu
- Directed by: Yoosuf Shafeeu
- Music by: Ayyuman Shareef
- Country of origin: Maldives
- Original language: Divehi
- No. of seasons: 1
- No. of episodes: 15

Production
- Producers: Ismail Shafeeq; Fathimath Fareela
- Cinematography: Shivaz Abdulla
- Editor: Yoosuf Shafeeu
- Production companies: E Creative Media; Shy Productions; Eupe Productions; 24 Entertainment Production

Original release
- Release: February 16 – May 11, 2023

Hayyaru is a Maldivian suspense thriller web series written and directed by Yoosuf Shafeeu. It stars Ahmed Nimal, Yoosuf Shafeeu, Ali Azim, Sujeetha Abdulla and Shiurath Abdulla in main roles. The pilot episode of the series was released on 16 February 2023.

== Cast and characters ==
=== Main ===
- Ahmed Nimal as Juneydh
- Yoosuf Shafeeu as Afzal
- Ali Azim as Reehan
- Sujeetha Abdulla as Fiyaza
- Shiurath Abdulla as Inaya
- Hussein Nadhuvi as Shaan
- Mohamed Ali as Iyaz

=== Recurring ===
- Ibrahim Rasheed as Thaufeeq
- Ahmed Ziya as Seexer

== Episodes ==
No.	Title	Directed by	Original release date
1	"Episode 1"	Yoosuf Shafeeu	February 16, 2023
Afzal, a submissive and jobless husband, takes a loan from Thaufeeq to satisfy his greedy and acquisitive wife, Fiyaza. One late night, Thaufeeq assaults Afzal while he is at the beach and warns him to settle all outstanding payments within fifteen days; otherwise, he might have to face fatal consequences. Upon returning home, Fiyaza demands that he buy the latest phone, which angers Afzal due to her lack of responsibility and empathy. Meanwhile, Juneydh, a grasping father, refuses to finance his daughter Inaya's wedding with Reehan, who is hell-bent on acquiring money from Juneydh for his wedding preparations.
2	"Episode 2"	Yoosuf Shafeeu	February 16, 2023
Juneydh's friend, Shaan request him to grant him a loan but the former declines his request. At the same time, Inaya approaches her father again but he outright refuses him. Reehan, determined to host a grand party insists her to further pressurize him to get the required money. As a last resort, they devise a plan together which would test Juneydh's affection towards Inaya. Soon after, Juneydh receives a call from Afzal, informing him that Inaya is kidnapped and being held captive by him.
3	"Episode 3"	Yoosuf Shafeeu	February 23, 2023
Juneydh is asked to get a ransom of six lakh rufiyaa if he wants his daughter back. He is assisted by his friend Shaan who is also the head of Police Criminal Department. Unable to contact Inaya, Reehan visits her house only to meet Juneydh who conceals the truth from him. Juneydh withdraws money and is asked to meet the kidnapper at "Handi Koshi" who is somehow linked to Juneydh. As Afzal is assured Juneydh is alone, he meets Juneydh inside the construction building and exchanges Inaya for the ransom.
4	"Episode 4"	Yoosuf Shafeeu	February 23, 2023
In the flashback it is revealed that Afzal was involved in the kidnapping in desperate for money and assigned by his resort friend, Iyaz, a person with multiple criminal records. Afzal executes the plan as per the given instructions. However, things take an unexpected turn when Afzal disappears after receiving money. Meanwhile, Shaan briefly questions Juneydh for the gaps in the timeline. It is later revealed that, after handing over the money, Juneydh overpowered Afzal and is now being held captive for interrogation.
5	"Episode 5"	Yoosuf Shafeeu	March 2, 2023
Anxious, Iyaz visits Afzal's house only to meet Fiyaza who is equally disturbed of her husband's disappearance. As Reehan and Inaya's plan backfires, they suspect Iyaz is behind everything and seeks help from Shaan to make exhortation. Juneydh begins his own investigation to dig deep into the kidnapping while the rest is troubled if it could reveal their involvement. Meanwhile, Seexer, a goon of Thaufeeq comes looking for Afzal, further stressing Fiyaza and Iyaz.
6	"Episode 6"	Yoosuf Shafeeu	March 9, 2023
Juneydh deduces that Afzal is coerced into kidnapping Inaya by another party and he is an inexperienced kidnapper. Afzal agrees to cooperate with Juneydh, but on one condition; allow him to call his wife once, which Juneydh rejects. Iyaz brings Fiyaza to a random place promising to show her the last known whereabouts of Afzal, and they are abruptly intervened by Seexer who kept following them all along.
7	"Episode 7"	Yoosuf Shafeeu	March 16, 2023
Seexer and Thaufeeq interrogate Iyaz to find out the truth about Afzal's disappearance, who tipped them about Inaya and Reehan. Juneydh questions Afzal to disclose who assigned him the task of kidnapping, to which Afzal tries to cover up their identity. Afzal ultimately agrees to reveal the truth for MVR1.5 lakh.
8	"Episode 8"	Yoosuf Shafeeu	March 23, 2023
As instructed by Juneydh, Afzal lures Iyaz into the building where he is being held captive, but fails to extract any new information. Juneydh transfers the money and Afzal points to a mobile phone which unravels shocking truths. Juneydh seeks Afzal and Iyaz help to capture the real culprit but for additional benefits.
9	"Episode 9"	Yoosuf Shafeeu	March 30, 2023
Afzal settles his pending payment and reconciles with Thaufeeq. Curious about Afzal's location, Shaan questions Iyaz, who cunningly leads him to the place of the kidnapping. At the site, Shaan encounters Juneydh, who accuses him of being complicit in the crime due to his loan denial, a claim which Shaan vehemently denies. Juneydh revisits their shared history, becoming increasingly convinced of Shaan's involvement and the fact he was assisted by some other closed ones.
10	"Episode 10"	Yoosuf Shafeeu	April 6, 2023
Inaya and Reehan grow suspicious of Shaan's loyalty. Reehan directly challenges Iyaz regarding the missing funds, leading him to the same location. Juneydh ridicules Reehan's scheme and confidently asserts that Reehan will never be able to marry his daughter. Afzal urges Juneydh to bring his daughter to the scene to help piece everything together.
11	"Episode 11"	Yoosuf Shafeeu	April 13, 2023
Reehan maintains his confidence that involving Inaya in the situation won't harm their relationship, a viewpoint that contrasts with Juneydh's beliefs. This leads to a sequence of flashback events, detailing the process of assigning Afzal to the task, his subsequent disappearance, and the ensuing chaos that followed.
12	"Episode 12"	Yoosuf Shafeeu	April 20, 2023
Inaya admits to her father that she is the mastermind behind the malevolent scheme. She proceeds to reveal how she skillfully manipulated both Reehan and Shaan into becoming unwitting accomplices to her plan.
13	"Episode 13"	Yoosuf Shafeeu	April 27, 2023
The episode delves into a series of flashbacks, depicting the meticulous planning process and the gradual adjustments that were made to the initial understanding. It showcases how minor improvisations were integrated into the plan, ultimately shaping the unfolding events.
14	"Episode 14"	Yoosuf Shafeeu	May 4, 2023
Through a flashback sequence, the narrative unveils the method by which Reehan and Inaya orchestrated the collection of upfront funds from Shaan. Additionally, it is disclosed how Inaya, in a last-minute decision, changes the location of the kidnapping. This is succeeded by a series of events characterized by misunderstandings and confusion stemming from the sudden disappearance of Afzal.
15	"Episode 15"	Yoosuf Shafeeu	May 11, 2023
In a significant revelation, Inaya not only admits to her actions driven by financial desperation but also accuses him of being responsible for her mother's death, alleging that his greed for money led him to commit the heinous act. Adding to the shock, Inaya discloses that Juneydh is not her biological father. As tensions escalate, a heated argument ensues between Inaya and Juneydh, culminating in a violent confrontation where she physically attacks Juneydh and inflicts a stab wound to his abdomen. The scene transitions, and Juneydh regains consciousness in a solitary room, his anger fueled by a burning desire for revenge, as he nurses his wounds.

== Release and reception ==
The first episode of the series was released on 16 February 2023 through MS Video Club. The series received mainly positive reviews from critics, most of the praise being attributed to the screenplay and direction by Yoosuf Shafeeu.
