= Dhevansoora =

2018 Maldivian film

- Official film poster
- Directed by: Yoosuf Shafeeu
- Written by: Yoosuf Shafeeu
- Screenplay by: Yoosuf Shafeeu
- Produced by: Yoosuf Shafeeu; Ahmed Shah Ali; Ali Shazleem
- Starring: Yoosuf Shafeeu; Mariyam Shifa; Ali Azim; Fathimath Azifa
- Cinematography: Ibrahim Moosa
- Edited by: Yoosuf Shafeeu
- Music by: Fathuhulla Shakeel
- Production company: My Dream Productions
- Distributed by: Eupe Productions
- Release date: February 6, 2018
- Country: Maldives
- Language: Dhivehi

Dhevansoora (transl. Dual faced) is a 2018 Maldivian suspense thriller film written and directed by Yoosuf Shafeeu. Produced by Shafeeu, Ali Ahmed Shah and Ali Shazleem under Eupe Productions, the film stars Shafeeu, Mariyam Shifa, Ali Azim and Fathimath Azifa in pivotal roles. The film was released on 6 February 2018.

== Plot ==
The film starts with Shiyan telling his therapist Dr. Shiyama about is lover Shiyadha. Just then two police officers come to Shiyan's house and find the corpse of Shiyadha. The police arrest Shiyan for this murder. In the police station, Shiyan is interrogated about Shiyadha's murder, to which Shiyan replied that it was Shiyam (with whom Shiyan believed Shiyadha is having an affair with) who killed her. In order to find Shiyam two police officers reach Shiyam's Island and learned that he left the house at the age of twenty and never returned

On the other hand, Police found a man named Mohammed Shiyam, who is believed to be Shiyadha's murderer. On interrogation, Shiyam revealed that Shiyadha is his wife and that they both got married in Sri Lanka. Shiyam decided to marry Shiyadha after his first wife betrayed him. But Shiyadha's parent was against this marriage. This happened to be the story Shiyan told the police. But still, police gave Shiyam a chance to defend himself. He revealed that one day when they ordered food and Shiyan was the delivery boy as the previous delivery boy was sick. Shiyan and Shiyadha bond together as they both share the same interest and Shiyan fell in love with her. Shiyam and Shiyadha left to Sri Lanka for their marriage and left Shiyan to take care of the house. When they returned to Maldives Shiyadha revealed that Shiyan had made up a story that he and Shiyadha are married, and Shiyadha confronted Shiyan about this. That night, Shiyadha ordered food while Shiyam went to drink water and was attacked. When he gained consciousness he found Shiyan near Shiyadha's dead body telling him to run for his life.

The police find Shiyam's story logical and decided to put both Shiyan and Shiyam in one cell. In the cell Shiyan attacked Shiyam where as Shiyam begs him to tell the truth. The police tracked the actual delivery boy Vafir who told the police that Shiyan is a psycho who always acts very weird and talks to himself. He even revealed that Shiyan killed Shiyadha. Shiyan is proven guilty and Shiyam has been set free. On the other hand, the police found an ID card with belongs to Hassan Shiyam who is none other than Shiyan himself. So the police realised that Shiyan has Multiple Personality Disorder which made him assume other personalities than his own. This is due to the trauma he had experienced in his childhood. Police brought Shiyam's mother, Shiyana hoping that he would confess his crime, but he only confess of not being able to help his mother and didn't tell anything about Shiyadha's murder. This made the police realise that Shiyam was not the culprit.

In an order to reveal the truth about Shiyadha's murder the police tried to force Shiyam's personality to overtake Shiyan's personality. Shiyam revealed that it was Vafir who killed Shiyadha. Vafir accepts his crime and Shiyan is set free.

In the ending scene Shiyama tells Shiyan that she will always remain as his shadow and will never leave him no matter what.

== Cast ==
- Yoosuf Shafeeu as Shiyan / Hassan Shiyam
  - Ali Azim as Young Hassan Shiyam
- Mariyam Shifa as Shiyadha Najeeb
- Mohamed Faisal as Station Inspector Thoha. Leading officer of Shiyadha's murder case
- Ibrahim Jihad as Police Staff Sergeant Ahmed Shiyad
- Ahmed Saeed as Chief Superintendent Riyaz. Reporting officer of Shiyadha's murder case
- Nashidha Mohamed as Thuhufa, Shiyad's wife
- Ahmed Easa as Vafir, deliver boy
- Jadhulla Ismail as Mohamed Shiyam, Shiyadha's husband
- Fathimath Azifa as Dr. Shiyama, Shiyan's so-called Therapist
- Mariyam Shakeela as Shiyana, Shiyam's mother
- Ali Shazleem as Police Sergeant Anees
- Mohamed Waheed as Najeeb, Shiyadha's father
- Mariyam Haleem as Arifa, Shiyadha's mother
- Hamdhoon Farooq as Qalib
- Ibrahim Naseer as Shuaib
- Mohamed Hassan as Police Sergeant Zameer
- Ashraf Mohamed as Mujuthaba

== Development ==
After the success of his previous comedy films, Baiveriyaa (2015) and Naughty 40 (2017), Shafeeu announced his next venture titled Dhevansoora, a suspense thriller, on 21 October 2017. On 30 October 2017, Shafeeu introduced debutant Mariyam Shifa in the lead role and praised her performance to be noteworthy. It was revealed that the film will feature 21 actors in several roles. Filming took place in Male', Hulhumale' and Villimale'.

== Soundtrack ==
Track listing
No.	Title	Lyrics	Music	Singer(s)	Length
1.	"Dhinufa Vee Fana"	Zarana Zareer	Fathuhulla Shakeel	Hussain Shifan

== Release ==
It was initially planned to release the film in December 2017. The first teaser of the film along with posters, were released on 31 October 2017. The release date was shifted to February 2018, citing unavailability of Olympus Cinema during December 2017.

== Accolades ==
Award	Category	Recipient(s) and nominee(s)	Result	Ref(s)
9th Gaumee Film Awards	Best film	Dhevansoora	Nominated	
9th Gaumee Film Awards	Best Director	Yoosuf Shafeeu	Won	
9th Gaumee Film Awards	Best Actor	Yoosuf Shafeeu	Won	
9th Gaumee Film Awards	Best Supporting Actor	Ibrahim Jihad	Nominated	
9th Gaumee Film Awards	Best Supporting Actor	Ali Azim	Nominated	
9th Gaumee Film Awards	Best Supporting Actress	Fathimath Azifa	Nominated	
9th Gaumee Film Awards	Original Song	Fathuhulla Shakeel for "Dhin Ufaa"	Nominated	
9th Gaumee Film Awards	Best Lyricist	Zarana Zareer for "Dhin Ufaa"	Nominated	
9th Gaumee Film Awards	Best Male Playback Singer	Hussain Shifan for "Dhin Ufaa"	Nominated	
9th Gaumee Film Awards	Best Editing	Yoosuf Shafeeu	Won	
9th Gaumee Film Awards	Best Cinematography	Ibrahim Moosa	Nominated	
9th Gaumee Film Awards	Best Screenplay	Yoosuf Shafeeu	Won	
9th Gaumee Film Awards	Best Background Music	Fathuhulla Shakeel	Nominated	
9th Gaumee Film Awards	Best Art Direction	Yoosuf Shafeeu	Nominated	
9th Gaumee Film Awards	Best Costume Design	Eupe Productions	Nominated	
9th Gaumee Film Awards	Best Sound Editing	Fathuhulla Shakeel	Nominated	
1st MSPA Film Awards	Best Film	Dhevansoora	Nominated	
1st MSPA Film Awards	Best Director	Yoosuf Shafeeu	Nominated	
1st MSPA Film Awards	Best Negative Role	Ali Azim	Nominated	
1st MSPA Film Awards	Best Original Screenplay	Yoosuf Shafeeu	Won	
1st MSPA Film Awards	Best Editor	Yoosuf Shafeeu	Won	
1st MSPA Film Awards	Best Cinematographer	Ibrahim Moosa	Won	
1st MSPA Film Awards	Best Makeup – Special Effects	Yoosuf Shafeeu, Mohamed Faisal	Nominated	

== Sequel ==
In February 2018, Shafeeu announced that he intended to develop a sequel of Dhevansoora, reprising the characters from the original.
