= Yoosuf Shafeeu =

Maldivian film actor, director, producer, writer and editor

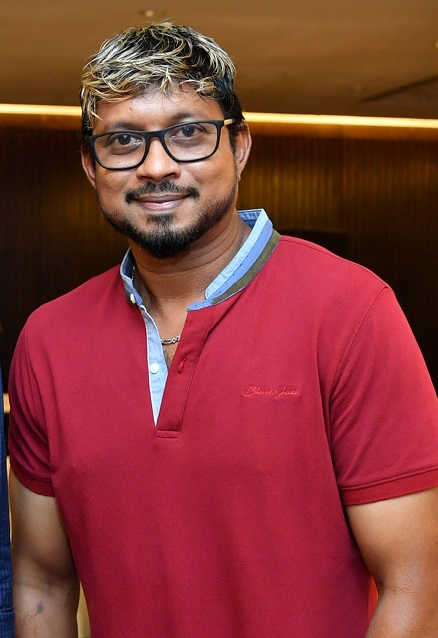
- Shafeeu in 2019
- Born: 20 October 1975 (age 50); Male', Maldives
- Occupations: Actor; director; producer; writer; editor
- Years active: 1999–present
- Spouses: Aminath Liusha (divorced); Fathimath Fareela (divorced); Nahula Ali (divorced); Aashaa Ishee (m. 2021)
- Children: 2

Yoosuf Shafeeu also known as Eupe (20 October 1975) is a Maldivian film actor, director, producer, writer and editor. Regarded as one of the most successful figures in Maldivian cinema, Shafeeu is the recipient numerous accolades, including eight Gaumee Film Awards, and a Maldives Film Award; holding the record for winning the most Gaumee Film Award for Best Actor. In 2003, the Government of Maldives honoured him with the National Award of Recognition.

Shafeeu made his career debut in Amjad Ibrahim's commercially successful comedy-drama Qurbaani (1999), followed by Hussain Adil's college romance Hiyy Halaaku, an unofficial remake of Kuch Kuch Hota Hai (1998). While he received criticism for his performances in Amjad Ibrahim's horror films; Sandhuravirey (2002), Dhonkamana (2003) and Sandhuravirey 2 (2004), he gained critical and commercial success with Fathimath Nahula-directed films such as Naaummeedhu (2000), Loabi Nuvevununama (2002) and Kalaayaanulaa (2003). His performance as a conflicted husband in Kalaayaanulaa, a father diagnosed with cancer in Fathimath Nahula's Zuleykha (2005) and a short-tempered husband in Abdul Faththaah's critically acclaimed Vehey Vaarey Therein (2003) earned him three Gaumee Film Award nominations for Best Actor, with a win for the latter.

Shafeeu won the Best Actor award again for his role in Ahmed Nimal's romantic film Vaaloabi Engeynama (2006) and was also nominated for Hukuru Vileyrey (2006). In 2015, he set a record by winning the Gaumee Film Award for Best Actor for the third consecutive time with Moomin Fuad's suspense thriller Happy Birthday (2009). He was also nominated in the same category for Yoosuf (2008) and Veeraana (2010), which he directed himself. From 2009 onward, he took on more roles as a writer and director, helming projects such as Hiyy Rohvaanulaa (2009), 01 January (2009), Mendhamuge Evaguthu (2010), Loaiybahtakaa (2009), Insaaf (2011). The latter two earned him nominations for Best Director at the Maldives Film Awards.

In later years, he diversified his roles, moving away from romantic characters and experimenting with different genres. In 2013, he starred in Ali Shifau-directed horror film Fathis Handhuvaruge Feshun 3D, first Maldivian 3D film and prequel where he played the iconic character Jinaa, which mainly received criticism. He then explored the thriller genre with 24 Gadi Iru (2014) and Dhevansoora (2018), and ventured into comedy with Baiveriyaa (2016), Naughty 40 (2017) and 40+ (2019), the first Maldivian horror-comedy film. Dhevansoora fetched him four awards including Best Director, Best Actor, Best Editing and Best Screenplay.

== Career ==
=== 1999–05: Early releases ===
In 1999, while working at Paradise Island Resort, a crew from Television Maldives noticed him and offered him a role in a video single. Persuaded by cinematographer Shiyaz, he featured in the video song "Dhiri Huri Furaana Dhaathee" alongside Jamsheedha Ahmed which became popular among audience. Afterwards, he returned to the resort and focused on his career there until he was spotted by director Amjad Ibrahim, who cast him in the comedy-drama film Qurbaani, starring opposite Mariyam Nisha and Hussain Sobah. The film was financially successful and was declared a Mega-Hit at the end of its cinema run. Encouraged by his growing interest in the industry, he resigned from his position at the resort and joined the Motion Pictures studio.

In 2000, he appeared in Saahibaa, directed by Arifa Ibrahim, and portrayed a college student in Hussain Adil's romance Hiyy Halaaku, along with Niuma Mohamed and Sheela Najeeb. The plot intertwined two love triangles set years apart—the first half depicting friendships on a college campus, and the second following a widower's daughter trying to reunite her father with his past love. The film was an unofficial remake of Karan Johar's romantic drama film Kuch Kuch Hota Hai (1998).

That same year, he starred in Ainbehge Loabi Firiehge Vaajib (2000), directed byAmjad Ibrahim, featuring Jamsheedha Ahmed, Arifa Ibrahim and Niuma Mohamed. The film revolves around a woman who has been mistreated by her step-mother and forced into a marriage she disapproves. The film revolved around a woman mistreated by her stepmother and forced into a marriage she disapproves of. He played a dual role: Hazaar, a man whose first wife had an extramarital affair and Shafiu, the man with whom Hazaar's second wife falls in love. He also portrayed a devoted husband opposite Mariyam Nisha in Amjad Ibrahim's comedy dramaMajubooru Loabi (2000).

In Aaah (2001), directed by Ibrahim, he starred alongside Sheela Najeeb, Jamsheedha Ahmed, Mohamed Shavin and Ibrahim Giyas. The film followed two siblings managing a family business and the downfall of the younger brother's love life upon discovering his fiancée was already married to an abusive husband. Additionally, he played Dr. Ahmed Shifan, a man longing for his unrequited love, in Fathimath Nahula's drama film Naaummeedhu (2001), a film about a happily married couple whose life is turned upside down when they inadvertently invite a seductive woman into their lives. The film received favourable reviews and was declared the highest-grossing Maldivian film of the year.

In 2002, he appeared in four films. In Loabi Nuvevununama (2002), directed by Ahmed Shimau and written by Fathimath Nahula, he played a handicapped man betrayed in love, who unknowingly marries his brother's love interest. The film was both a critical and commercial success. He then collaborated with Amjad Ibrahim on two projects: the horror film Sandhuravirey (2002), which told the story of a female jinn seeking a human's love, and the drama Kahvalhah Dhaandhen (2002), opposite Sheela Najeeb and Kausar. Both films received mixed to negative reviews from critics. He then played a single father who sacrifices his love for the sake of his handicapped friend in Mohamed Rasheed's Hithu Vindhu (2002), alongside Mariyam Nazima and Ali Seezan.

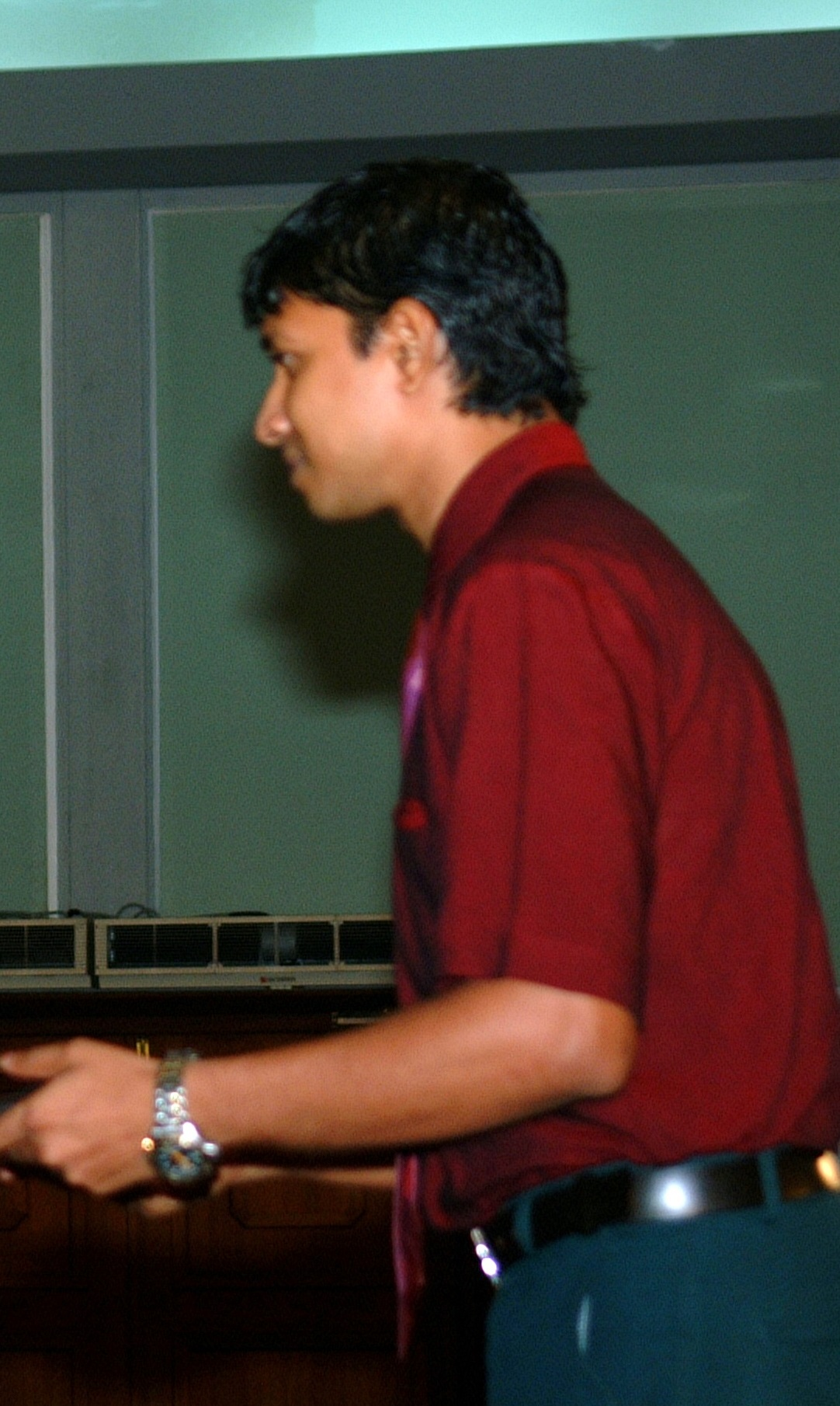
Shafeeu receiving the National Award of Recognition, 2003

In 2003, he worked with Amjad Ibrahim on the romantic horror film Dhonkamana (2003), which depicted a relationship between a young man (played by him) and an older woman (played by Fauziyya Hassan). Despite negative reviews, the film was praised for addressing a relationship with a significant age gap. His most successful release of the year was Fathimath Nahula's romantic drama Kalaayaanulaa (2003), where he played a husband who, after being dissatisfied with his marriage, decides to wed his childhood best friend. The film received widespread acclaim and was the highest-grossing Maldivian film of the year. His performance earned him a nomination for Best Actor at the Gaumee Film Awards. He won his first Gaumee Film Award for Best Actor for his portrayal of a negligent and short-tempered husband entangled in an extramarital affair in Abdul Faththaah's critically praised romantic drama Vehey Vaarey Therein (2003). The film, featuring Jamsheedha Ahmed, Khadheeja Ibrahim Didi, Mohamed Shavin, Amira Ismail and Aminath Rasheedha, explored themes of unrequited love and became one of the highest-grossing Maldivian films of the year.

That same year, he starred alongside Ismail Rasheed and Mariyam Nisha in Hussain Rasheed's Edhi Edhi Hoadheemey (2003), as an ambitious young man who refutes a marriage proposal to pursue his education. Upon release, the film received mainly positive reviews from critics. Hilath Rasheed reviewing from Haveeru Daily praised the performance by actors and also the moments of "pure artistry and sheer film-making brilliance" in the film. During the year, he starred in two television series: the social drama Edhuvas En'buri Annaanenama, directed by Fathimath Nahula, and the family drama Dheewanaa Hiyy, directed by Easa Shareef. In the former, he portrayed a drug abuser struggling to cope after losing his love interest, while in the latter, he played an obedient son who discovers the truth about his father in adulthood.

In 2004, Shafeeu reprised his role as Dhiyash in Sandhuravirey 2 (2004), the sequel to Sandhuravirey (2002). The sequel introduced additional cast members, including Niuma Mohamed, Zeenath Abbas, Mohamed Shavin and Sheereen Abdul Wahid. He also portrayed the role of an established film actor, Nail, the son of Dhiyash and Shafqa, who is harassed by a jinn—his half-sister. Like its predecessor, the film received negative reviews. The following year, he starred in Edhathuru which followed eight friends on a picnic to a haunted, uninhabited island and their struggle for survival. The film received praise for its sound effects and was commercially successful.

The following year, he starred in Zuleykha (2005), a romantic drama directed by Fathimath Nahula, which was both critically acclaimed and commercially successful. The film followed the journey of a nine-year-old girl searching for her mother's lost love. Starring alongside Sheela Najeeb, Mariyam Nisha, Ali Seezan, Mohamed Manik and Mariyam Enash Sinan, he played a vulnerable father diagnosed with terminal cancer. His performance earned him a Gaumee Film Award nomination for Best Actor and won him Gaumee Film Award nomination as the Best Actor. The film screened 33 houseful shows at the cinema, making it the highest-grossing Maldivian film of the year.

=== 2006–09: Awards and recognition ===
Shafeeu starred in another horror film, Hukuru Vileyrey (2006), co-directed by Aishath Rishmy and Aminath Rasheedha, based on a novel published by Ibrahim Waheed in Haveeru Daily in 2003. The film was both a critical and commercial success and was considered "one of the few acceptable horror films the Maldivian film industry has ever produced". It was later released as a 15-episode television series, incorporating several scenes that had been edited out of the theatrical version. His performance as an aspiring author who becomes enthralled by an evil spirit earned him a Gaumee Film Award nomination for Best Actor. His next release, Ahmed Nimal's romantic film Vaaloabi Engeynama (2006), in which he starred alongside Mariyam Afeefa, Fathimath Fareela and Fauziyya Hassan, was a critical and commercial success. It was regarded as the most successful Maldivian film of the year. His portrayal of a conflicted husband struggling to balance his affection for his two wives won him his second Gaumee Film Award as the Best Actor.

In 2007, Shafeeu released the horror short film series Vasvaas, which he wrote, produced and directed. He also starred in all four instalments of the series, portraying an evil master and introducing the character of Kudafoolhu, a jinn who manipulates and misleads people. The series gained popularity among children at the time of its release for its innovative concept, and its technical aspects were praised by critics. His performance earned him a nomination for the Gaumee Film Award for Best Supporting Actor. Following this, he created a two-part horror short film series, Edhonveli Thundi, starring alongside Ali Riyaz and Fathimath Fareela. In the film, he played a blind man and the brother of an unfortunate man who unknowingly vows to marry a spirit. The film won two awards at the 5th Gaumee Film Awards, securing Best Film and Best Director in the short film category.

In 2008, Shafeeu appeared in Fathimath Nahula's romantic drama Yoosuf which depicted the story of a deaf and mute man (played by Shafeeu) mistreated by a wealthy family who mocked his disability. Featuring an ensemble cast—including Niuma Mohamed, Sheela Najeeb, Mohamed Manik, Ahmed Nimal, Fauziyya Hassan, Ravee Farooq, Zeenath Abbas and Ahmed Lais Asimt—who were at the time the biggest names in Maldivian cinema. He described his role in the film as the most challenging of his career. The film received widespread critical acclaim and achieved a blockbuster status at the box office and one of the highest grossing Maldivian films of all time. The film was Maldivian official entry at 2009 SAARC Film Festivals and had the distinction of being the festival's opening film. His performance earned him nomination for Best Actor at both the Gaumee Film Awards and the Maldives Film Awards. That same year, he co-directed the romantic drama Soora (2008) with Fathimath Nahula. Originally released as a television series, it received a positive response.

In 2009, Shafeeu had six film releases. His first role was in Amjad Ibrahim's romantic horror film Udhabaani, where he played the boyfriend of a schoolgirl haunted by a supernatural force. Although the film received mixed reviews from critics, it performed well at the box office, becoming Ibrahim's most successful venture. He then took on a more controversial role in Ahmed Nimal's family drama E Dharifulhu (2009), portraying a seemingly tender husband who rapes his wife's younger sister. The film featured an ensemble cast, including Niuma Mohamed, Mohamed Manik, Sheela Najeeb and Ahmed Nimal. His performance earned him his third Maldives Film Award nomination for Best Actor. He next starred in Moomin Fuad's suspense thriller Happy Birthday (2009), which follows a simple man who receives a call on his birthday informing him that his wife and son have been kidnapped for ransom. He played the role of Asif, a straightforward man who endures an unfortunate birthday. Despite positive critical reception, the film was a commercial failure, with only five screenings and low audience turnout. However, it won five Gaumee Film Awards and twelve Maldives Film Awards and was even screened at the Venice Film Festival. His performance earned him the Best Actor award at both the 6th Gaumee Film Awards and 1st Maldives Film Awards.

That same year, Shafeeu wrote, directed and starred in the drama film Hiyy Rohvaanulaa (2009), alongside Niuma Mohamed, Abdulla Muaz and Nadhiya Hassan. The story follows a blind man who regains his sight but pretends to still be blind to uncover his wife's affair with another man. He portrayed Shiyan, a school supervisor who lost his sense of purpose due to his blindness. The film received favourable reviews and was a commercial success. Another release of the year was Loaiybahtakaa (2009), which was written and directed by Shafeeu and starting him as an orphan who discovers his true identity. A romantic drama co-starring Sheela Najeeb, Fathimath Fareela and Mohamed Faisal, the film explored themes of unrequited love and became a commercial success. His work as both actor and director earned him a nomination at the 1st Maldives Film Awards. During the year, he also released the short film 01 January (2009), a psychological thriller he directed and starred in alongside Yoosuf Zuhuree, Hamdhan Farooq and Mohamed Rifshan. He played a disturbed landlord who terrifies his tenants with his erratic behavior and cryptic instructions.

=== 2010–12: Expansion into film production ===
Shafeeu's first release of 2010 was the Ali Shifau-directed family drama Dhin Veynuge Hithaamaigaa where he played the role of Nashid, a character victimized due to family vengeance by his cousin. The film explores themes of discrimination against islanders, family revenge, and fatherhood responsibilities. It received positive reviews from critics and was considered a significant improvement over recent Maldivian films. The film achieved commercial success, screening fifteen houseful shows. He next starred alongside Sheela Najeeb and Mohamed Manik in Ahmed Nimal's horror film Zalzalaa En'buri Aun (2010), a spin-off of Aslam Rasheed's horror classic Zalzalaa (2000), which starred Ibrahim Wisan, Ali Shameel and Niuma Mohamed. The plot revolves around a mariage blanc, a husband's murder by his wife and her secret lover, and supernatural vengeance. He played the role of Ahmed Hamza, an asexual husband who, after being murdered by his wife, seeks revenge through possession by a spirit. The film received mixed reviews from critics and performed moderately at the box office.

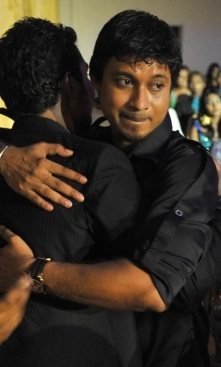
Shafeeu at 1st Maldives Film Awards ceremony, 2011

Later in 2010, Shafeeu appeared alongside Niuma Mohamed and Amira Ismail in Veeraana, a drama film addressing child sexual abuse. Directed by Shafeeu himself, he played Shahin, a father who discovers that his daughter has been sexually assaulted by her step-uncle. The film received mixed to positive reviews, with critics appreciating its attempt to tackle a sensitive topic, though some criticized its melodramatic execution. His performance was deemed satisfactory by the critics. With strong pre-release anticipation, the film was a commercial success. He received a nomination for the Best Actor at the 2nd Maldives Film Awards and a nomination for Best Editing at the 6th Gaumee Film Awards. He then starred in Niuma (2010), the directorial debut of Niuma Mohamed, alongside an ensemble cast including Mohamed, Sheela Najeeb, Mohamed Manik, Ahmed Nimal, Aminath Rasheedha and Abdulla Muaz. He played a brother who ultimately supports his sister after she endures sexual abuse by their father and brother. The film received widespread critical acclaim, particularly for its performances and dialogue. It was a major box office success, screening over thirty houseful shows and becoming the highest-grossing Maldivian film of the year. He received a nomination for Best Choreography for the song "Hiyy Dhevijjey" at the 6th Gaumee Film Awards. Following this, he co-wrote and co-directed the horror film, Mendhamuge Evaguthu (2010) with Amjad Ibrahim. The story follows a group of ten friends who watch a horror film, only to find themselves affected by its narration.

Shafeeu's final release of 2010 was the drama Heyonuvaane (2010), which he directed and starred in alongside Sheela Najeeb and Fathimath Fareela. The film revolves around a man who suffers domestic abuse. He portrayed an impotent husband subjected to discrimination and mistreatment by his domineering wife. While the film received largely negative reviews, his performance was praised. Ahmed Naif from Sun commended his acting but criticized his direction, stating, "The use of flashbacks and character introduction was weak. Neither the order of scenes nor the transitions were noteworthy". Despite the criticism, the film was a commercial success, screening twenty-two houseful shows and becoming the second highest-grossing Maldivian release of the year.

Shafeeu began 2011 with Amjad Ibrahim's suspense thriller film Hafaraaiy, starring alongside Ali Shameel, Mariyam Shakeela, Amira Ismail and Fathimath Fareela. The film, based on a real-life incident, tells the story of a veiled woman who develops a cannibalistic addiction. It was both a critical and commercial failure, with reviewers criticizing its weak plot and unnecessary characters, though its makeup effects were appreciated. Ahmed Naif from Sun commented, "Neither scientifically nor psychologically does the film justify how a chicken addict turns into a cannibal. It transitions from suspense thriller to comedy due to its implausible details". He then directed and starred in the family drama E Bappa (2011), which featured an ensemble cast including Koyya Hassan Manik, Mohamed Manik, Sheela Najeeb, Amira Ismail, Lufshan Shakeeb, Mariyam Shakeela and Fathimath Fareela. The film, centered on themes of fatherhood and familial responsibilities, received negative reviews for its stereotypical approach and underperformed at the box office. His string of box office disappointments continued with Laelaa (2011), directed by Hamid Ali, where he starred opposite Amira Ismail and Fathimath Azifa.

Shafeeu's final release of 2011 was Insaaf, an action drama that he directed and starred in as a police officer named Aiman. The film portrays conflicts between two districts of an island. Upon release, it received mixed to positive reviews. Ahmed Nadheem from Haveeru noted, "Shafeeu clearly invested effort in developing the characters, but he neglected his own. He has demonstrated his acting ability in other films, but this was not his best performance. His work behind the camera was as underwhelming as his acting in the film". Despite the criticism, Shafeeu was nominated for Best Supporting Actor and Best Director at the 2nd Maldives Film Awards.

=== 2013–2017: Further production ventures ===
In 2013, Shafeeu starred in the Ali Shifau-directed horror film Fathis Handhuvaruge Feshun 3D, a prequel to Fathis Handhuvaru (1997), which originally starred Reeko Moosa Manik and Niuma Mohamed in the lead roles. The film was based on Ibrahim Waheed's 2009 story, Jinaa: Fathis Handhuvaruge Feshun, which itself serves as a prequel to Fathishandhuvaru (1996) later adapted into the 1997 film of the same name. Marketed as the first Maldivian film released in 3D, the film saw Sahfeeu portray Jinaa, seeking revenge on humans for the murder of its wife. Upon release, the film received generally negative reviews. Ahmed Nadheem of Haveeru Daily commented, "Hearing the name Jinaa, one expects the influence of Reeko Moosa Manik, but Shafeeu pales in comparison. The lack of excitement in his performance raises concerns that audiences may lose appreciation for the classic character". Despite the criticism, Shafeeu was nominated for Best Actor at the 7th Gaumee Film Awards for his performance.

The following year, he starred opposite Fathimath Azifa in the suspense thriller 24 Gadi Iru (2014) wwhich he co-directed with Mohamed Rasheed. The film explores a romantic relationship between a girl diagnosed with a mental illness and her psychiatrist. Although production began in 2010, the film was released four years later. His role as Visham, a psychiatrist and the film received mixed reviews from critics.

In 2016, Shafeeu appeared as Mifu, a member of a group of friends trapped in a haunted house, in Fathimath Nahula's horror film 4426. The film received mostly positive reviews, with Ahmed Nadheem of Avas describing it as a "masterpiece" praising Shafeeu's performance as "good". The film was declared the highest-grossing Maldivian film of the year. That same year, he starred alongside Niuma Mohamed in Ibrahim Wisan's debut direction Vee Beyvafa (2016), which was shot in 2011. The film received negative reviews, with Ahmed Adhushan of Mihaaru calling it "a step backward" for Maldivian cinema. His final release of the year was Baiveriyaa (2016), a comedy film that he wrote, edited, and directed. The film follows an aspiring actress who runs away from her family to pursue a career in the industry, leading to a series of misunderstandings and suspicions. praising the comic timing and highlighting the heated exchanges between Shafeeu and Sheela Najeeb as standout moments. He noted, "Shafeeu proves he has a sense of comedy, despite not having explored the genre before". The film emerged as one of the highest-grossing Maldivian films of the year.

Shafeeu's first release of 2017 was the romantic comedy Naughty 40, which he directed and starred in alongside Mohamed Manik, Ahmed Saeed and Ali Seezan, Fathimath Azifa and Ali Azim. The film revolves around three friends, Ashwanee, Ahsan and Ajwad (Played by Shafeeu, Saeed and Manik respectively) who, despite being in their forties, maintain a youthful outlook on life. The film achieved both critical and commercial success, becoming one of the highest-grossing Maldivian films of the year. He next appeared alongside Fathimath Azifa and Jadhulla Ismail in Neydhen Vakivaakah, directed by Mohamed Aboobakuru. Unlike his previous release, this film was a critical and commercial failure.

=== 2018–23: Experiment with different genres ===
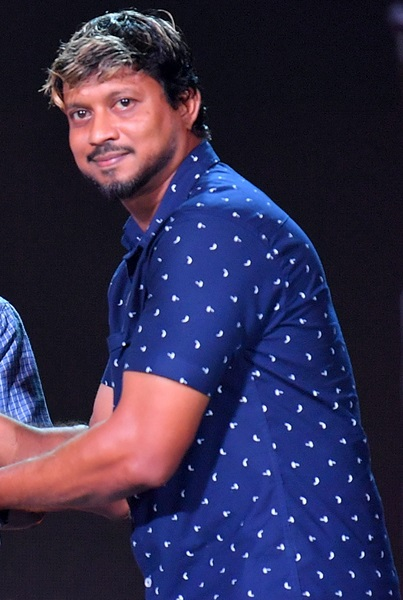
Shafeeu at 9th Gaumee Film Awards ceremony, 2019

2018 was a slow year for the Maldivian film industry, largely due to the 2018 Maldivian presidential election. As a result, Shafeeu had only one film release that year: the suspense thriller Dhevansoora (2018), which he wrote and directed. The film marked his thirtieth directorial project and featured an ensemble cast of twenty-one actors. Centered around a murder investigation, Shafeeu portrayed a character suffering from dissociative identity disorder, who is accused of murder. The film received positive reviews from critics and was regarded as a "norm-breaker" in Maldivian cinema. Ahmed Hameed Adam, reviewing from VNews, described Shafeeu's performance as the "highlight of the film," noting, "Watch out for the little nuances he brought into his character during the investigation scenes". Ismail Nail Rasheed from Raajje.mv wrote, "Shafeeu had to portray three different roles in the film, and he lived in each character to its fullest". The film fetched him four awards at the 9th Gaumee Film Awards including Best Director, Best Actor, Best Editing and Best Screenplay. That same year, he starred in the first Maldivian web series, Huvaa, a romantic drama directed by Fathimath Nahula. The series follows a happy and close-knit family that is shattered by a tragic incident leading to an irreparable loss. The series, along with his performance as a caring husband and responsible father who is mistakenly stabbed and murdered, was well received by audiences and critics.

In 2019, Shafeeu's first release was the psychological horror thriller Nivairoalhi, directed by Moomin Fuad, which marked Niuma Mohamed's final onscreen film appearance. Starring alongside Mohamed and Ahmed Asim, he film received mostly positive reviews. Aishath Maaha from Dho? praised the lead performances and the screenplay's structure but criticized its "weak ending" as unsatisfactory. Commending Shafeeu's performance as a businessman and the husband of a woman suffering from depression, Maaha wrote, "The less said about Shafeeu's performance, the better. His performance is on par with the standards he himself has created". This was followed by his horror comedy film 40+ (2019), a sequel to the 2017 released comedy film Naughty 40 which performed well both critically and commercially. He then directed and starred in Nafrathuvumun (2019), alongside Mariyam Azza, Ali Azim and Ahmed Easa. The film revolves around a guesthouse, the sole source of income for a woman who is persuaded by several men to sell the property. Mariyam Waheedha from Miadhu praised Shafeeu's "simple yet convincing" performance as a supportive friend. Ifraz Ali from Dho? ranked the film among the top five releases of the year, stating, "The director has chosen a different yet engaging concept but fails to bring out the best in the actors". His next project was Dhauvath (2019), a romantic horror film that follows a newlywed couple on their honeymoon as they experience paranormal activities caused by black magic. Waheedha praised the film for its exploration of witchcraft and black magic while effectively delivering a moral message and drawing strong performances from the cast. However, Ifraz Ali from Dho? ranked it among the worst five films of the year, pointing out its resemblance to Turkey's Sijjin film series.

In 2022, he starred in Ahmed Nimal's suspense thriller Hehes, portraying an atoll councilor caught between his wife and ex-girlfriend. The following year, he wrote and directed the comedy film Jokaru, which follows a trio of thugs in pursuit of a suitcase, leading to a series of comical misadventures. While Aminath Luba from The Press while described it as a "laugh riot," she criticized the film's "lagging" first half and excessive humor, which she considered a drawback. The same year, he released the horror film Kalhaki, in which he played the role of Sharif, one of the friends who embark on a holiday getaway, only to find their trip turning into a horrifying nightmare as bizarre events unfold. The film received mixed to positive reviews from critics. Aminath Luba reviewing for The Press praised his performance as a protective brother and commended his direction for effectively "putting all the pieces together". He also released the suspense thriller web series Hayyaru, where he played a desperate husband forced into a blackmail scheme to settle his debts.

=== 2024–present: Further releases ===
In 2024, Shafeeu wrote and directed the romantic horror film Saaya, starring alongside Ibrahim Jihad and Aminath Rashfa. The story follows a newlywed couple whose honeymoon on an uninhabited island is disrupted by a vengeful spirit. The film received mixed to positive reviews from critics. Ahmed Hameed Adam from Minoos praised the film's technical aspects, particularly Shafeeu's screenplay, but found the climax lackluster due to its open-ended conclusion. Ahmed Nadheem from Mihaaru highlighted Shafeeu's overall contribution as the film's strength, though he pointed out plot inconsistencies, overdramatic dialogues, and overacting by some cast members as drawbacks. He then collaborated with Hussain Munawwar for the family drama Kamanaa (2024), starring Mariyam Azza and Aminath Rashfa alongside him. The film follows a happily married couple whose relationship is shattered when the husband undergoes a drastic transformation, while the wife fights to protect herself and her unborn child. The film received mainly positive response from critics and audiences. Aminath Lubaa from The Press described Shafeeu as "a proven versatile actor" who has solidified his standing in the industry. The film had a remarkable theatrical run, screening thirty-seven houseful shows and becoming one of the most commercially successful films in Maldivian cinema history.

== Media image ==
In 2011, Shafeeu was selected in the top five as the "Most Entertaining Actor" in the SunFM Awards 2010, an award night ceremony initiated by Sun Media Group to honour the most recognized personalities in different fields, during the previous year. In 2018, he was ranked in the second position from Dho?'s list of Top Ten Actor of Maldives.

== Filmography ==
Key
†	Denotes films that have not yet been released

=== Feature film ===
Year	Title	Role	Notes	Ref(s)
1999	Qurbaani	Shiyam		
2000	Saahibaa	Shahudhu		
2000	Hiyy Halaaku	Shahil Hannan		
2000	Ainbehge Loabi Firiehge Vaajib	Hazaar / Shafiu		
2000	Majubooru Loabi	Naushad		
2001	Aaah	Junaid		
2001	Naaummeedhu	Dr. Ahmed Shifan		
2002	Loabi Nuvevununama	Ziyad		
2002	Sandhuravirey	Dhiyash		
2002	Kahvalhah Dhaandhen	Viaam		
2002	Hithu Vindhu	Riyaz		
2003	Kalaayaanulaa	Nashid	Nominated—Gaumee Film Award for Best Actor	
2003	Dhonkamana	Shahil	Also the co-writer	
2003	Edhi Edhi Hoadheemey	Rashwan		
2003	Vehey Vaarey Therein	Azim	Gaumee Film Award for Best Actor	
2004	Sandhuravirey 2	Nail / Dhiyash		
2004	Hama Himeyn	Dr. Ibrahim	Special appearance	
2004	Edhathuru	Eevan	Also the director, writer and editor	
2005	Zuleykha	Shahid	Nominated—Gaumee Film Award for Best Actor	
2006	Hukuru Vileyrey	Fairooz	Nominated—Gaumee Film Award for Best Actor	
2006	Vaaloabi Engeynama	Ali Shiham	Gaumee Film Award for Best Actor	
2008	Yoosuf	Yoosuf Ali	Nominated—Gaumee Film Award for Best Actor; Nominated—Maldives Film Award for Best Actor	
2009	Udhabaani	Laamiu	Also the editor	
2009	Hiyy Rohvaanulaa	Shiyan	Also the director, editor and writer	
2009	Happy Birthday	Asif	Gaumee Film Award for Best Actor; Maldives Film Award for Best Actor	
2009	E Dharifulhu	Yanish	Also the editor Nominated—Maldives Film Award for Best Actor	
2009	Loaiybahtakaa	Najah	Also the director and writer	
2010	Dhin Veynuge Hithaamaigaa	Nashid		
2010	Zalzalaa En'buri Aun	Ahmed Hamza		
2010	Veeraana	Shahin	Also the director and editor Nominated—Gaumee Film Award for Best Actor; Nominated—Maldives Film Award for Best Actor	
2010	Niuma	Nihan		
2010	Mendhamuge Evaguthu	Naveen	Also the director, editor and writer	
2010	Heyonuvaane	Ziyad	Also the director and editor	
2011	Hafaraaiy	Naail		
2011	E Bappa	Liyaz	Also the director and editor	
2011	Laelaa	Ziyad		
2011	Insaaf	Aiman	Also the director, editor and writer Nominated—Maldives Film Award for Best Director; Nominated—Maldives Film Award for Best Supporting Actor	
2013	Fathis Handhuvaruge Feshun 3D	Jinaa	Nominated—Gaumee Film Award for Best Actor	
2014	24 Gadi Iru	Dr. Visham	Also the director	
2016	4426	Mifu		
2016	Vee Beyvafa	Hassan Ziyad		
2016	Baiveriyaa	Werash	Also the director, editor and writer	
2017	Naughty 40	Ashvani	Also the director, editor and writer	
2017	Neydhen Vakivaakah	Shihan		
2018	Dhevansoora	Shiyan / Hassan Shiyam	Also the director, producer, editor and writer Gaumee Film Award for Best Director; Gaumee Film Award for Best Actor	
2019	Nivairoalhi	Riffath Abdul Rahman		
2019	40+	Ashvani	Also the director, editor and writer	
2019	Nafrathuvumun	Maaniu	Also the director, producer, editor and writer	
2022	Hehes	Naveen	Also the writer, editor and co-producer	
2023	Jokaru	Himself	Also the director, writer and editor Special appearance in item number "Vagunge Jagadaa"	
2023	Kalhaki	Sharif	Also the director, writer and editor	
2024	Saaya		Also the director, writer and editor	
2024	Kamanaa	Haidar		
2025	Abadhah	Amru		
2025	Sorry	Maiz		
2025	Ilzaam	Shaheen	Also the director, writer and editor	
2025	Koss Gina Mistake	Amsad	Also the writer and editor	
2026	Gilan †	Dhaain	Completed	

=== Television ===
Year	Title	Role	Notes	Ref(s)
2003	Edhuvas En'buri Annaanenama	Niyaz	Main role; 5 episodes	
2003	Dheewanaa Hiyy	Amir	Main role; 5 episodes	
2004	Dhanmaanu			
2005	Baiveriyaa	Adheel	Main role; 14 episodes	
2018	Huvaa	Haanim	Main role; 8 episodes Also the co-editor and co-director	
2019	Kushuge Hafaraaiy	Himself	Also the narrator, screenwriter and director	
2023	Hayyaru	Afzal	Main role; 15 episodes Also the director, screenwriter and editor	
2024	Ereahfahu	Lyle	Main role; 15 episodes Also the director and editor	

=== Short film ===
Year	Title	Role	Notes	Ref(s)
2006	Vasvaas 1	Master	Also the director, co-producer and writer	
2007	Ossunu Iraaeku	Farish		
2007	Vasvaas 2	Kudafoolhu	Also the director, co-producer and writer	
2007	Vasvaas 3	Kudafoolhu	Also the director, co-producer and writer	
2007	Edhonveli Thundi 1	Ali's brother	Also the director, co-producer, writer and editor Gaumee Film Award for Best Director – Short Film	
2007	Vasvaas 4	Kudafoolhu	Also the director, co-producer and writer	
2007	Dhanvaru			
2008	Edhonveli Thundi 2	Ali's brother	Also the director, co-producer, writer and editor	
2008	E Sirru	Shaheem	Also the director, co-producer, writer and editor	
2009	E Vaguthu		Also the director	
2009	01 January	Unnamed	Also the director and writer	

=== Other work ===
Year	Title	Director	Producer	Writer	Editor	Notes	Ref(s)
2003	Dhonkamana			Yes		Feature film	
2004	Edhathuru	Yes		Yes	Yes	Feature film	
2004	Dheke Dhekeves 1	Yes			Yes	Short film	
2005	Dheke Dhekeves 2				Yes	Short film	
2006	Vasvaas 1	Yes	Yes	Yes	Yes	Short film	
2006	Hiyani				Yes	Feature film	
2006	Salhibe	Yes		Yes	Yes	Short film	
2007	Vasvaas 2	Yes	Yes	Yes	Yes	Short film	
2007	Vasvaas 3	Yes	Yes	Yes	Yes	Short film	
2007	Edhonveli Thundi 1	Yes	Yes	Yes	Yes	Short film	
2007	Vasvaas 4	Yes	Yes	Yes	Yes	Short film	
2008	Salhibe 2	Yes	Yes	Yes	Yes	Short film	
2008	Edhonveli Thundi 2	Yes	Yes	Yes	Yes	Short film	
2008	E Sirru	Yes	Yes	Yes	Yes	Short film	
2008	Soora	Yes			Yes	Television series; 5 episodes	
2009	Udhabaani				Yes	Feature film	
2009	Hiyy Rohvaanulaa	Yes		Yes	Yes	Feature film	
2009	E Vaguthu	Yes				Short film	
2009	01 January	Yes	Yes	Yes	Yes	Short film	
2009	E Dharifulhu			Yes	Yes	Feature film	
2009	Loaiybahtakaa	Yes		Yes		Feature film	
2009	Bulhaa Dhombe	Yes			Yes	Short film	
2010	Veeraana	Yes			Yes	Feature film	
2010	Mendhamuge Evaguthu	Yes		Yes	Yes	Feature film	
2010	Heyonuvaane	Yes			Yes	Feature film	
2011	E Bappa	Yes		Yes	Yes	Feature film	
2011	Insaaf	Yes		Yes	Yes	Feature film	
2014	24 Gadi Iru	Yes				Feature film	
2016	Baiveriyaa	Yes		Yes	Yes	Feature film	
2017	Naughty 40	Yes		Yes	Yes	Feature film	
2018	Dhevansoora	Yes	Yes	Yes	Yes	Feature film	
2018–2020	Huvaa	Yes			Yes	Web series	
2019	40+	Yes		Yes	Yes	Feature film	
2019	Gellunu Furaana	Yes			Yes	Television series; 6 episodes	
2019	Dhauvath	Yes		Yes	Yes	Feature film	
2019	Nafrathuvumun	Yes	Yes	Yes	Yes	Feature film	
2020–2021	Huvaa Kohfa Bunan	Yes	Yes	Yes	Yes	Web series	
2021	Avahteriya	Yes	Yes	Yes	Yes	Web series	
2021	Hatharu Manzaru	Yes		Yes	Yes	Segment "Fulhi"	
2021	Giridha	Yes	Yes	Yes	Yes	Web series	
2022	Hehes		Yes	Yes	Yes	Feature film	
2022	Baby	Yes		Yes	Yes	Web series; 3 episodes	
2022	Hissu			Yes	Yes	Web series; 3 episodes	
2022	Bahdhal			Yes	Yes	Web series; 3 episodes	
2023	Jokaru	Yes		Yes	Yes	Feature film	
2023	Kalhaki	Yes		Yes	Yes	Feature film	
2023	Hayyaru	Yes		Yes	Yes	Web series; 15 episodes	
2024	Saaya	Yes		Yes	Yes	Feature film	
2024	Ereahfahu	Yes			Yes	Web series; 15 episodes	
2025	Ilzaam	Yes		Yes	Yes	Feature film	

== Accolades ==
Year	Award	Category	Nominated work	Result	Ref(s)
2003	National Award of Recognition	Performing Arts - Acting		Won	
2007	1st Miadhu Crystal Awards	Best Actor	Zuleykha	Won	
2007	4th Gaumee Film Awards	Best Actor	Vehey Vaarey Therein	Won	
2007	4th Gaumee Film Awards	Best Actor	Kalaayaanulaa	Nominated	
2007	4th Gaumee Film Awards	Best Actor	Zuleykha	Nominated	
2008	5th Gaumee Film Awards	Best Actor	Vaaloabi Engeynama	Won	
2008	5th Gaumee Film Awards	Best Actor	Hukuru Vileyrey	Nominated	
2008	5th Gaumee Film Awards	Best Supporting Actor — Short Film	Vasvaas	Nominated	
2008	5th Gaumee Film Awards	Best Director — Short film	Edhonveli Thundi 1	Won	
2009	1st SunFM Awards	Best Male Entertainer		Nominated	
2011	1st Maldives Film Awards	Best Director	Loaiybahtakaa	Nominated	
2011	1st Maldives Film Awards	Best Actor	Happy Birthday	Won	
2011	1st Maldives Film Awards	Best Actor	E Dharifulhu	Nominated	
2011	1st Maldives Film Awards	Best Actor	Yoosuf	Nominated	
2011	1st Maldives Film Awards	Best Choreography	"Haa Ufaa" – Hiyy Rohvaanulaa (Shared with Abdulla Muaz)	Nominated	
2011	2nd SunFM Awards	Most Entertaining Actor		Nominated	
2012	2nd Maldives Film Awards	Best Director	Insaaf	Nominated	
2012	2nd Maldives Film Awards	Best Actor	Veeraana	Nominated	
2012	2nd Maldives Film Awards	Best Supporting Actor	Insaaf	Nominated	
2012	2nd Maldives Film Awards	Best Editing	Insaaf (Shared with Ahmed Ziya)	Nominated	
2014	3rd Maldives Film Awards	Best Actor	Fathis Handhuvaruge Feshun 3D	Nominated	
2015	6th Gaumee Film Awards	Best Actor	Happy Birthday	Won	
2015	6th Gaumee Film Awards	Best Actor	Veeraana	Nominated	
2015	6th Gaumee Film Awards	Best Actor	Yoosuf	Nominated	
2015	6th Gaumee Film Awards	Best Editing	Veeraana	Nominated	
2015	6th Gaumee Film Awards	Best Choreography	"Hiyy Dhevijjey" – Niuma	Nominated	
2016	7th Gaumee Film Awards	Best Actor	Fathis Handhuvaruge Feshun 3D	Nominated	
2016	7th Gaumee Film Awards	Best Costume Design	Insaaf (Shared with Ahmed Saeed, Ismail Shafeeq)	Nominated	
2019	9th Gaumee Film Awards	Best Director	Dhevansoora	Won	
2019	9th Gaumee Film Awards	Best Actor	Dhevansoora	Won	
2019	9th Gaumee Film Awards	Best Editing	Dhevansoora	Won	
2019	9th Gaumee Film Awards	Best Screenplay	Dhevansoora	Won	
2019	9th Gaumee Film Awards	Best Art Direction	Dhevansoora	Nominated	
2025	1st MSPA Film Awards	Best Director	Dhevansoora	Nominated	
2025	1st MSPA Film Awards	Best Lead Actor – Male	Nivairoalhi	Nominated	
2025	1st MSPA Film Awards	Best Supporting Actor – Male	Kalhaki	Won	
2025	1st MSPA Film Awards	Best Original Screenplay	Dhevansoora	Won	
2025	1st MSPA Film Awards	Best Original Screenplay	40+	Nominated	
2025	1st MSPA Film Awards	Best Editor	Dhevansoora	Won	
2025	1st MSPA Film Awards	Best Choreography	Dhauvath	Nominated	
2025	1st MSPA Film Awards	Best Makeup – Special Effects	Dhevansoora (Shared with Mohamed Faisal)	Nominated	
2025	5th Karnataka International Film Festival	Best Lead Actor	Kamanaa	Won	
