= Mariyam Shifa =

Maldivian actress (born 1999)

- Born: 21 November 1999 (age 26); Lh. Naifaru
- Occupation: Actress
- Years active: 2018–present
- Spouse: Mohamed Tholal (m. 2018; died 2019)
- Children: 1

Mariyam Shifa (22 November 1999) is a Maldivian film actress, dancer and social media personality. She has earned over 1.7 million likes on TikTok.

== Early life ==
Shifa attributed her singing and dancing skills to her parents; her father being a prominent boduberu player and her mother being a singer, played a huge role in accomplishing her "dream of becoming an actor". Naming Aishath Rishmy, Nuzuhath Shuaib and Ali Seezan as her inspirations, Shifa grew up in a cinema-friendly environment.

== Career ==
In 2018, at the age of seventeen, Shifa made her career debut with the suspense thriller film Dhevansoora (2018) written and directed by Yoosuf Shafeeu. Revolving around a murder investigation, she played an imaginary doctor counselling the character played by Shafeeu; a man suffering from dissociative identity disorder. The film received positive reviews from critics and was considered a "norm-breaker" for the Maldivian cinema. Reviewing from Raajje.mv, Ismail Naail Nasheed considered her performance to be "good" despite being a newcomer though he noted that she "needs to polish her dialogue delivery in specific scenes which requires extreme emotion". The following year, she played a small role in the Moomin Fuad-directed psychological horror thriller Nivairoalhi (2019) as a victim who get murdered by a religious extremist. Starring opposite Niuma Mohamed, Yoosuf Shafeeu and Ahmed Asim, the film received majorly positive reviews from critics; Aishath Maaha of Dho? favored the performance of the actors and mentioned the "neat arrangement" of its screenplay though pointed out its "weak ending" to be unsatisfactory. She next starred in Yoosuf Shafeeu's horror comedy film 40+ (2019), a sequel to 2017 released comedy film Naughty 40, which was well received both critically and commercially. Besides, she also played the role of Mizna, a straightforward simple girl who is concerned about her married life, in Mohamed Manik-directed psychological web series Haasaa.

In 2020, she collaborated with Moomin Fuad for his period drama web television series Gamini.

She performed as a dancer in multiple shows in Maldives. She is also a social media influencer with almost 2 million likes on TikTok.

== Filmography ==
Key
†	Denotes films that have not yet been released

=== Feature film ===
Year	Title	Role	Notes	Ref(s)
2018	Dhevansoora	Shiyadha		
2019	Nivairoalhi	Hardy's friend	Special appearance	
2019	40+	Lailaa		
2022	Hehes	Zara		
2023	November	Sana		
2024	Gellunu Rey			
2025	Ilzaam	Lizee		
2025	Koss Gina Mistake	Raaniya		
2026	Majunoon	Laana		

=== Television ===
Year	Title	Role	Notes	Ref(s)
2019–2020	Haasaa	Mizna	Main role; 13 Episodes	
2020	Gamini	Lubna's friend	Recurring role; 2 Episodes	
2020–2021	Huvaa Kohfa Bunan	Haifa	Main role	
2021	Rumi á Jannat	Lizy	Guest role; Episode: "Vaashey Mashaa Ekee"	
2021	Nafsu	Hudha	Main role; 10 episodes	
2022–2023	Lafuzu	Laika	Main role; 32 episodes	
2022	Vihaali	Shanee	Guest role in the segment "Lift Golhi"	
2022	Balgish	Haaya	Main role; 5 episodes	
2023	Yaaraa	Shifa	Guest role; "Episode 1 & 16"	
2024	Ereahfahu	Sara	Main role; 15 episodes	
2025	Imthihaan	Afa	Main role	
2026	JunJulaa	Nahudha		

=== Short film ===
Year	Title	Role	Notes	Ref(s)
2020	Feehaali	Herself	Special appearance	

== Accolades ==
Year	Award	Category	Nominated work	Result	Ref(s)
2025	1st MSPA Film Awards	BBest Makeup – Glamour	Hehes	Nominated	
