= Hehes =

2022 Maldivian film

- Official film poster
- Directed by: Ahmed Nimal
- Written by: Yoosuf Shafeeu
- Screenplay by: Yoosuf Shafeeu
- Produced by: Ismail Shafeeq; Ali Shaniz Mohamed; Yoosuf Shafeeu
- Starring: Yoosuf Shafeeu; Ibrahim Jihad; Ali Azim; Shiyaza Mohamed; Mariyam Shifa; Washiya Mohamed; Irufana Ibrahim; Mariyam Shifa
- Cinematography: Ibrahim Moosa
- Edited by: Yoosuf Shafeeu
- Music by: Hassan Jalaal; Baachi
- Production companies: Eupe Productions; Shy Production
- Distributed by: Medianet
- Release date: 2 May 2022
- Country: Maldives
- Language: Dhivehi

Hehes is a 2022 Maldivian suspense thriller film directed by Ahmed Nimal. Produced by Ismail Shafeeq and Ali Shaniz Mohamed under Eupe Productions and Shy Production, the film stars Yoosuf Shafeeu, Ibrahim Jihad, Ali Azim, Shiyaza Mohamed, Washiya Mohamed, Irufana Ibrahim and Mariyam Shifa in pivotal roles. The film was released on 2 May 2022, on the occasion of Eid al-Fitr 1443.

== Plot ==
Sara (Shiyaza Mohamed) invites her Instagram friend, Ina (Washiya Mohamed) to her island to capture nature photos, who happens to be her husband, Naveen's (Yoosuf Shafeeu) ex-girlfriend. Naveen broke up with Ina, four years ago, due to her behavior and thirst for money. Naveen's younger brother, Mubeen (Ali Azim) aspires to become a politician though he refuses to compete with his brother, Naveen, who is the current atoll councilor. However, his soon-to-be wife, Niufa (Irufana Ibrahim), a policewoman, puts pressure on him to compete against his brother and to replace him. Ina starts blackmailing Naveen into fulfilling her demands and makes advances on him. Naveen decides to meet her to clear all their misunderstandings but gets caught by Niufa during her night patrolling. Once Ina's behavior was unbearable for Naveen, he throws her out of their house, much to Sara's discomfort and surprise. Naveen agrees to meet Ina one last time to delete the misrepresentative photos of their initial encounter, but Sara follows him and catches them together. Ina fabricates lies and changes her narrative to blame everything on Naveen, which leads to the separation of Naveen and Ina. Things take an unexpected turn when their separation is celebrated by some close friends while revealing the mastermind behind the ploy.

== Cast ==
- Ahmed Nimal as Raqeeb
- Yoosuf Shafeeu as Naveen
- Ibrahim Jihad as Ziyadh
- Ali Azim as Mubeen
- Mariyam Shifa as Zara
- Irufana Ibrahim as Niufa
- Washiya Mohamed as Ina
- Shiyaza Mohamed as Sara
- Mariyam Shifa as Seema
- Mohamed Manik as himself (special appearance)

== Development ==
The film and its cast was announced on 12 March 2020. It was reported that the film will star an ensemble cast as female lead including the newcomers Washiya Mohamed, Irufana Ibrahim, Mariyam Shifa along with the debutants Shiyaza Mohamed and Aishath Lahfa. Filming commenced in March 2020 in B. Goidhoo. The filming was severely interrupted due to the COVID-19 pandemic. Shooting for the first schedule resumes at Goidhoo on 11 June 2021 and was completed on 26 July 2021. Rest of the scenes were shot in Male'.

== Soundtrack ==
Track listing
No.	Title	Music	Singer(s)	Length
1.	"Veynekey Ishq Mee"	Hassan Jalaal	Mohamed Abdul Ghanee, Mariyam Ashfa

== Release ==
In June 2021, it was reported that film will not have a theatrical release and will instead be premiered on Medianet Multi Screen. The film was released on 2 May 2022, on the occasion of Eid al-Fitr 1443.

== Accolades ==
Award	Category	Recipients	Result	Ref.
3rd Karnataka International Film Festival – 2023	Best Supporting Actress – Feature Films	Washiya Mohamed	Won	
3rd Karnataka International Film Festival – 2023	Best Cinematographer – Feature Films	Ibrahim Moosa	Won	
1st MSPA Film Awards	Best Supporting Actor – Female	Washiya Mohamed	Won	
1st MSPA Film Awards	Best Cinematographer	Ibrahim Moosa	Nominated	
1st MSPA Film Awards	Best Makeup – Glamour	Mariyam Shifa	Nominated	
