= Jadhulla Ismail =

Maldivian actor and fashion designer

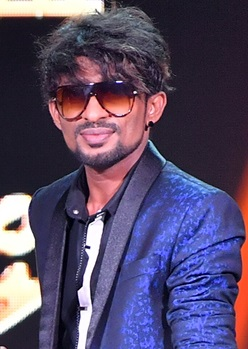
- Ismail handing over an award at 9th Gaumee Film Awards
- Born: 20 March 1979 (age 47); GDh. Thinadhoo, Maldives
- Occupations: Actor, fashion designer
- Years active: 2002–present

Jadhulla Ismail (born 20 March 1979) is a Maldivian film actor and fashion designer.

== Early life ==
Jadhulla Ismail was born on 20 March 1979 and hailed from a southern island of Maldives, GDh. Thinadhoo. He was raised in a family where his sibling sisters had a passion for styling and dressmaking, which he credits for his inspiration to make his own design. However, he had to face several obstacles and was proved to be a tough call for a little boy where societal norms looked down on those that defied gender norms. Despite every challenges, he prevailed on his journey to chase his goal to be reputed fashion stylist in Maldives. After relocating to Male', Ismail joined Maldives National Defense Force in 1998 and worked at MNDF for five years before joining Maldives Police Service.

== Career ==
=== Fashion designing ===
At the age of seventeen, Ismail started working a professional fashion designer and introduced his brand "Jaadhu". He is acknowledged as one of the few designers in Maldives who has maintained a fashion brand. While working at MNDF, Ismail received the opportunity to sew and design costumes for the entertainment shows and stage performances organized by them, which enabled him to showcase his talent to the public. Deemed as a skillful craftsman and hoping to hold a name of his own in the fashion industry, Ismail expanded his workshop into the film industry, where he styled and designed for several music videos, films and stage performances. He is known for his philanthropic acts where he has contributed to several fundraising event in Maldives by sewing, designing and styling all the clothes, free of charge for all the members participated in the fundraising stage events for 2004 Benefit for Tsunami Victims.

Anticipating to pursue a professional career in fashion designing, Ismail completed multiple designing courses in Sri Lanka and India. Accoladed as a pioneer in the Maldivian design industry, Ismail's areas of creativity span the broad spheres of cinema, design, styling and wedding attire. Throughout the career, he has organized numerous training courses all around Maldives.

In 2005, Ismail initiated a fashion show titled "Breeze" to showcase his design which was celebrated as the "most grand fashion" event held in Maldives by a solo designer, with 45 models and displaying a total of 145 unique designs to a large audience. Two years later, he collaborated with Miss Universe Sri Lanka to design clothes for the pageant's competitors. In 2009, he was awarded as the Best Fashion Designer in a local fashion show, Fashion Unlimited. Recognizing his passion for the industry and commitment to develop individuals with fashion sense, in 2011, the Government of Maldives honoured him with the National Award of Recognition for Applied Arts. In 2013, he won the National Youth Award in Fashion Designing.

=== Acting ===
He made his film debut alongside Yoosuf Shafeeu and Fathimath Azifa in Shafeeu's romantic drama film Neydhen Vakivaakah (2017), which was a critical and commercial failure. In the film he played the role of Nizam, a simple and diffident young man who gets into a relationship with a cursed woman.

The following year, he starred in the first Maldivian web-series, a romantic drama by Fathimath Nahula, Huvaa. The series centers around a happy and radiant family which breaks into despairing pieces after a tragic incident that led to an unaccountable loss. The series and his performance as an unfortunate lover were positively received by the critics and audience.

He then collaborated with Shafeeu for his thirtieth direction Dhevansoora (2018), a suspense thriller film featuring an ensemble cast including Shafeeu, Mariyam Shifa, Ali Azim and Fathimath Azifa in pivotal roles. Revolving around a murder investigating, he played the husband accused for the murder of his wife. The film received positive reviews from critics and was considered a "norm-breaker" for the Maldivian cinema.

== Filmography ==
=== Feature film ===
Year	Title	Role	Notes	Ref(s)
2010	Dhin Veynuge Hithaamaigaa	Himself	Special appearance in the song "Annaashey Hinithun Velamaa"	
2017	Neydhen Vakivaakah	Ahmed Nizam		
2018	Dhevansoora	Mohamed Shiyam		

=== Television ===
Year	Title	Role	Notes	Ref(s)
2018	Huvaa	Manik	Main role; 13 episodes	
2026	JunJulaa	Sameer		

== Accolades ==
Year	Award	Category	Nominated work	Result	Ref(s)
2007	Miss Universe Sri Lanka	Best Fashion Designer		Won	
2007	4th Gaumee Film Awards	Best Costume Design	Zuleykha (shared with Laila)	Won	
2009	Fashion Unlimited	All Around First Place		Won	
2009	Fashion Unlimited	Best Casual Wear		Won	
2009	Fashion Unlimited	Best Party Wear		Won	
2011	National Award of Recognition	Applied Arts - Fashion Designing		Won	
2013	National Youth Award	Fashion Designing		Won	
2015	6th Gaumee Film Awards	Best Costume Design	Yoosuf (shared with Razeena Thaufeeq)	Nominated	
2021	ASIA Awards 2020/2021	Asia's Fashion & Lifestyle Face Award		Won	
2025	1st MSPA Film Awards	Best Costume Designer	40+	Nominated	
