= Ilzaam (2025 film) =

2025 Maldivian film

- Official film poster
- Directed by: Yoosuf Shafeeu
- Written by: Yoosuf Shafeeu
- Screenplay by: Yoosuf Shafeeu
- Produced by: Ali Maisan; Mohamed Abdulla
- Starring: Yoosuf Shafeeu; Mohamed Faisal; Amira Ismail; Ahmed Nimal; Mohamed Rasheed; Mariyam Shakeela
- Cinematography: Ibrahim Wisan
- Edited by: Yoosuf Shafeeu; Ahmed Nimal
- Music by: Ayyuman Shareef
- Production companies: Eupe Productions; Dheke Dhekeves Productions
- Release date: 20 October 2025
- Running time: 157 minutes
- Country: Maldives
- Language: Dhivehi

Ilzaam (lit accusation) is a 2025 Maldivian family drama film written and directed by Yoosuf Shafeeu. Co-produced by Ali Maisan and Mohamed Abdulla under the banner Eupe Productions and Dheke Dhekeves Productions, the film stars an ensemble cast including Shafeeu, Mohamed Faisal, Amira Ismail, Ahmed Nimal, Mohamed Rasheed, Mariyam Shakeela and Ahmed Saeed. The film was released on 20 October 2025, coinciding with Shafeeu's fiftieth birthday.

== Cast ==
- Yoosuf Shafeeu as Shaheen
- Mohamed Faisal as Shaheem
- Amira Ismail as Rasma
- Ahmed Nimal as Shiyam
- Mohamed Rasheed as Rashid
- Mariyam Shakeela as Zarifa
- Ahmed Saeed as Manik
- Mohamed Jumayyil as Adhil
- Mariyam Shifa as Lizee
- Ibrahim Jihad as Ibrahim Wajeeh (special appearance)
- Shaheedha Ahmed as Warudha
- Ibrahim Moosa
- Aishath Laisha Latheef as Shifna
- Kinza Hussain as Lamha
- Fazuna Yoosuf
- Washiya Mohamed (Special Appearance)

== Development ==
On 10 March 2025, Amira Ismail confirmed that she will be appearing in a Yoosuf Shafeeu-directed feature film titled Ilzaam. The project was officially announced in mid-August 2025. The cast of the film were announced as Yoosuf Shafeeu, Ahmed Nimal, Mariyam Shakeela, Sheela Najeeb and Mariyam Azza. However the official cast list was later released without Najeeb and Azza, while adding actors as Mohamed Faisal, Amira Ismail, Mohamed Rasheed, Ahmed Saeed, Mohamed Jumayyil and Mariyam Shifa. Filming took place in ADh. Dhangethi.

== Soundtrack ==
Track listing
No.	Title	Lyrics	Singer(s)	Length
1.	"Ilzaam" (Title song)	Mohamed Abdul Ghanee	Malik Nasir
2.	"Ilzaam" (Promo song)	Mohamed Abdul Ghanee	Ibrahim Zaid Ali

== Release and reception ==
The film was theatrically released on 20 October 2025. It received mainly positive reviews from critics, specifically praising the performance of lead actors including Shafeeu, Shifa and Laisha. Due to strong audience demand, additional screenings were scheduled at theatres.
