= Vasvaas =

Maldivian horror short film series

- Opening title scene of the film
- Directed by: Yoosuf Shafeeu
- Written by: Yoosuf Shafeeu (Part 1-4); Abdulla Muaz (Part 1)
- Screenplay by: Yoosuf Shafeeu
- Produced by: Yoosuf Shafeeu (Part 1-4); Hussain Nooradeen (Part 1); Hassan Adam (Part 2-4)
- Production company: Eupe Productions
- Country: Maldives
- Language: Dhivehi

Vasvaas is a four-part Maldivian horror children's short film series produced by Yoosuf Shafeeu, Hussain Nooradeen and Hassan Adam under Eupe Productions. The first installment of the series, written and directed by Yoosuf Shafeeu was released in 2006 and continued as the writer and director for other installments too. The second installment, begins fifty years later from the events of the first part and the story was continued for further two installments. Filming for the second to fourth installment was completed in Kelaa. Several actors, including Fathimath Fareela and Shaahid filmed for significant roles for the film though the series was discontinued after the fourth installment.

== List of productions ==
Title	Release date	Director(s)	Producer(s)	Story by	Screenwriter(s)	Cinematographer(s)	Editor(s)	Ref(s)
Vasvaas 1	2006	Yoosuf Shafeeu	Hussain Nooradeen; Yoosuf Shafeeu	Yoosuf Shafeeu; Abdulla Muaz	Yoosuf Shafeeu	Hassan Haleem	Yoosuf Shafeeu	
Vasvaas 2	2007	Yoosuf Shafeeu	Yoosuf Shafeeu; Hassan Adam	Yoosuf Shafeeu	Yoosuf Shafeeu	Ibrahim Moosa	Yoosuf Shafeeu	
Vasvaas 3	1 April 2007	Yoosuf Shafeeu	Yoosuf Shafeeu; Hassan Adam	Yoosuf Shafeeu	Yoosuf Shafeeu	Ibrahim Moosa	Yoosuf Shafeeu	
Vasvaas 4	1 November 2007	Yoosuf Shafeeu	Yoosuf Shafeeu; Hassan Adam	Yoosuf Shafeeu	Yoosuf Shafeeu	Ibrahim Moosa	Yoosuf Shafeeu	

== Premise ==
=== Vasvaas 1 ===
On his birthday, Ali (Abdulla Muaz) gets a gift from his wife, Suzy (Shiuna), that all her wealth and prosperity belongs to him on the condition that she remains as his only wife, while he has a private affair with another woman, Laila (Thuhufaa). Meanwhile, an evil master (Yoosuf Shafeeu) along with his puppet, Kudafoolhu (Hussain Munawwar) makes it his life mission to implant evil suggestions on locals to put themselves in the wrong, while the saint man, Sheikhul Hayya (Ahmed Ziya) attempts to avert his mission. In a cat and mouse game, Suzy dies at the hand of the Master and Ali rejoices her demise as he now owns all her wealth. After Ali and Laila's wedding, the latter encounters several horror incidents which is known to be the action of the Master as he starts having feelings towards Laila. The Master, ultimately reveals that he is to avenge Ali for peeing on him on a fourteenth lunar night and the Master along with Kuafoolhu and Suzy torture Ali to death. The final battle between Sheikh and the Master ends as the latter gets buried underground.

=== Vasvaas 2 ===
Fifty years later to the events of Vasvaas 1, a group of friends who left in a boat on a stormy night, get stranded on an uninhabited island the next morning. The friends start experiencing strange incidents in their journey from witnessing immortal objects talking, dead end paths to strange appearing creatures. Slowly they start disappearing one by one, while the leader of the group, Faiz (Ali Riyaz) along with another member, Munawwar, unintentionally help Kudafoolhu (Yoosuf Shafeeu) to wake up from his eternal-sleeping curse.

=== Vasvaas 3 ===
Later that night, they encounter with Kudafoolhu, who expresses his gratitude for lifting the spell unto him by his new evil Master, and in return offers to help them. Kudafoolhu insists to break into the residency mansion of the evil creatures and help Sheikhul Hayya escape, whom he guarantees can help the stranded humans. The group along with Kudafoolhu discuss a masterplan while the creatures desperately hunt for them.

=== Vasvaas 4 ===
Sheikhul Hayya is held captive for further interrogation, while the humans travel closer to the mansion with hurdles and unforeseen barriers. Faiz is discovered to possess unexplained powers after drinking the yolk of a destructive egg. On their way, they meet other humans who have been held captive in the island for over an year.

== Cast ==
Vasvaas 1

- Abdulla Muaz as Ali
- Ahmed Ziya as Sheikhul Hayya
- Hussain Munawwar as Kudafoolhu
- Yoosuf Shafeeu as Master
- Shiuna as Suzy
- Thuhufaa as Laila

Vasvaas 2

- Yoosuf Shafeeu as Kudafoolhu (special appearance)
- Ali Riyaz as Faiz
- Mariyam Shahuza as Raihana
- Naashidha Mohamed as Reysham
- Hamdha as Fiyaza
- Saajidh as Faisal
- Aishath Rasheedha as Kamana
- Saalim as Zakariyya
- Solah Mohamed as Munawwar
- Ahmed Ali as Baburu Boa
- Qadhir as Baburu Chee

Vasvaas 3

- Yoosuf Shafeeu as Kudafoolhu
- Ali Riyaz as Faiz
- Ahmed Ziya as Sheikhul Hayya
- Mariyam Shahuza as Raihana
- Naashidha Mohamed as Reysham
- Hamdha as Fiyaza
- Aishath Rasheedha as Kamana
- Solah Mohamed as Munawwar
- Ahmed Ali as Baburu Boa
- Qadhir as Baburu Chee
- Mohamed as Barra Boa

Vasvaas 4

- Yoosuf Shafeeu as Kudafoolhu
- Ali Riyaz as Faiz
- Ahmed Ziya as Sheikhul Hayya
- Mariyam Shahuza Raihana
- Naashidha Mohamed as Reysham
- Hamdha as Fiyaza
- Saajidh as Faisal
- Aishath Rasheedha as Kamana
- Solah Mohamed as Munawwar
- Ahmed Ali as Baburu Boa
- Qadhir as Baburu Chee
- Mohamed as Barra Boa
- Azhar as Faaraveriya
- Fisaan as Thui Thunbu
- Mohamed Ali

Other credited roles filmed for further installments

- Fathimath Fareela as Malaka
- Saalim as Zakariyya
- Shaahid as Ayya Boodey
- Ibrahim as Anwar
- Shaanee as Shaanee
- Abdulla as Assad

== Soundtrack ==
No.	Title	Music	Singer(s)	Length
1.	"Vasvaahun Hiyyve Haas"	Ibrahim Nifar	Mohamed Abdul Ghanee	5:13

== Accolades ==
Year	Award	Category	Nominated work	Result	Ref(s)
2008	5th Gaumee Film Awards	Best Supporting Actor	Yoosuf Shafeeu — Vasvaas 1	Nominated	
2008	5th Gaumee Film Awards	Best Actor — Short film	Ali Riyaz — Vasvaas 2	Won	
2008	2nd Miadhu Crystal Award	Best Makeup — Short film	Hassan Adam	Won	
