= Mohamed Rifshan =

Maldivian film actor

- Born: 7 April 1985 (age 41); K. Thulusdhoo
- Occupation: Actor
- Years active: 2008–present

Mohamed Rifshan (born 7 April 1985) is a Maldivian film actor.

== Career ==
Before pursuing a career in acting, Rifshan appeared in minor roles in short films and television series filmed in his home island, K. Thulusdhoo.

In 2009, Rifshan appeared alongside Fathimath Fareela in Loaiybahtakaa (2009), a romantic drama written and directed by Yoosuf Shafeeu, where he portrayed a thug harassing a young woman. That same year, he acted in several short films, including Dheulhi Ehnuvi Dhiulhi, 01 January, Seedhibe and Dheke Dhekeves 5, all filmed in Thulusdhoo.

In 2011, Rifshan reprised his role as a thug in Yoosuf Shafeeu's action drama film Insaaf, which explores the tensions between two districts of an island. The film received mixed to positive reviews upon release. He also appeared in television series such as Adhives Eloaibah Gadharu Kuran where he played a supportive friend to an aspiring vocalist, marking a departure from his usual gangster roles. Subsequently, he portrayed antagonistic characters in the series Kaiveni and Vakivumuge Kurin.

In 2017, Rifshan appeared in a comedic role alongside an ensemble cast including Yoosuf Shafeeu, Mohamed Manik, Ahmed Saeed and Ali Seezan in the romantic comedy film Naughty 40. The film, centered on three middle-aged friends embracing a youthful outlook, featured Rifshan as Hanim, a womanizer and family member targeting a rival businessman. The film achieved critical and commercial success, becoming one of the highest grossing Maldivian films of the year. He also starred in the first Maldivian web series, Huvaa, a romantic drama by Fathimath Nahula. He played a thug whose accidental murder sets off a series of tragic events within a happy family.

In 2019, Rishfan collaborated with Dark Rain Entertainment on two films. He had a brief role in Ahmed Sinan's crime thriller Goh Raalhu and he appeared in Ali Shifau's comedy film Maamui, as a gangster's bodyguard willing to go to great lengths for a bottle of honey, which holds unexpected value. The latter received positive reviews. Rifshan also played a recurring role in Dark Rain Entertainment's romantic comedy sitcom Rumi á Jannat, explores the dynamics of a newlywed couple with contrasting personalities. The same year, he featured in Mohamed Faisal's romantic web series Loabi Vias and films such as Faree (2021), portraying characters often aligned with his established "thug" persona.

In 2022, Rifshan worked with Ali Seezan for his romantic web series Dhoadhi. The series follows the story of two troubled individuals whose fates intertwine as they cross the sea in search of love and affection. The series received mostly negative reviews from critics. He also collaborated with Ismail Shafeeq for his suspense thriller web series Hissu which narrates the struggles of a man searching for his missing wife. The following year, he reunited with Yoosuf Shafeeu for his comedy film Jokaru (2023). The plot revolves around three thugs chasing a suitcase, resulting in comedic escapades. Aminath Luba from The Press described it as a "laughing riot" and praised the performance of the actors.

== Filmography ==
=== Feature film ===
| Year | Title | Role | Notes | Ref(s) |
|---|---|---|---|---|
| 2009 | Loaiybahtakaa | Iqbal | | |
| 2011 | Insaaf | Ammadey | | |
| 2017 | Naughty 40 | Hanim | | |
| 2019 | Goh Raalhu | Husham's friend | Special appearance | |
| 2019 | Maamui | Hudhu Mukhthar's bodyguard | | |
| 2021 | Faree | Thug | Special appearance | |
| 2023 | Hindhukolheh | Counsellor | | |
| 2023 | Jokaru | Aaf | | |
| 2024 | Fureytha | Isse | | |
| 2025 | Sorry | Hashim | | |
| 2025 | Alifaan | | | |
| 2026 | Majunoon | Fahumee | Special appearance | |

=== Television ===
| Year | Title | Role | Notes | Ref(s) |
|---|---|---|---|---|
| 2012–2013 | Adhives Eloaibah Gadharu Kuran | Rafeeq | Recurring role; 13 episodes | |
| 2012 | Kaiveni | Rifshan | Main role; 5 episodes | |
| 2015 | Vakivumuge Kurin | Shaheeb | Recurring role; 6 episodes | |
| 2018–2020 | Huvaa | Mahmood | Recurring role; 5 episodes | |
| 2019–2021 | Aharenves Loabivey | Wafir | Recurring role; 12 episodes | |
| 2021 | Rumi á Jannat | Ali "ET" Idhurees | Main role; 5 episodes | |
| 2021 | Loabi Vias | Ramiz | Recurring role; 8 episodes | |
| 2022 | Giritee Loabi | Masoodh | Guest role; "Episode 22" | |
| 2022 | Dhoadhi | Shamin | Recurring role; 6 episodes | |
| 2022 | Hissu | Ziyadh | Main role; 3 episodes | |
| 2023 | Gareena | Farey | Guest role; "Episode 9" | |
| 2024 | Yaaraa | Jailam | Guest role; "Episode 33 and 43" | |

=== Short film ===
| Year | Title | Role | Notes |
|---|---|---|---|
| 2008 | Paruvaanaa | Ghafoor | |
| 2009 | Dheulhi Ehnuvi Dhiulhi | Taxi driver | Special appearance |
| 2009 | 01 January | Unnamed | |
| 2009 | Seedhibe | Kahurab | |
| 2009 | Dheke Dhekeves 5 | Dhonko | |
