= Mendhamuge Evaguthu =

- Official film poster
- Directed by: Yoosuf Shafeeu; Amjad Ibrahim
- Written by: Yoosuf Shafeeu; Hussain Rasheed
- Screenplay by: Yoosuf Shafeeu; Amjad Ibrahim
- Produced by: Hussain Rasheed
- Starring: Yoosuf Shafeeu; Fathimath Fareela; Ahmed Fizam; Amira Ismail
- Edited by: Yoosuf Shafeeu; Amjad Ibrahim
- Music by: Ayyuman Shareef
- Production company: Farivaa Films
- Release date: November 9, 2010
- Country: Maldives
- Language: Dhivehi

Mendhamuge Evaguthu is a 2010 Maldivian horror film written and directed by Yoosuf Shafeeu and Amjad Ibrahim. Produced by Hussain Rasheed, the film stars Yoosuf Shafeeu, Fathimath Fareela, Ali Fizam and Amira Ismail in pivotal roles.

== Plot ==
A group of ten friends gather at a haunted house to watch a horror film. The screened film revolves around four friends who observe a rash of red bumps on their skin once they narrate a true terror incident that had happened on Addu Link Road.

== Cast ==
- Yoosuf Shafeeu as Naveen
- Fathimath Fareela as Mahira
- Ahmed Fizam as Naufal
- Amira Ismail as Shaufa
- Mohamed Faisal as Faisal
- Ibrahim Manik
- Zoya
- Ismail
- Wafir
- Yameen
- Munawar

== Soundtrack ==
Track listing
No.	Title	Singer(s)	Length
1.	"Ibaraskalaange Niyaafulhah"	Mohamed Abdul Ghanee
