= Nivairoalhi =

2019 Maldivian film

- Official film poster
- Directed by: Moomin Fuad
- Written by: Moomin Fuad
- Screenplay by: Moomin Fuad
- Produced by: Niuma Mohamed
- Starring: Niuma Mohamed; Yoosuf Shafeeu; Ahmed Asim
- Cinematography: Hussain Adnan
- Edited by: Hussain Adnan
- Music by: Fathuhulla Abdul Fahthah
- Production company: NiuXo Films
- Release date: 3 January 2019
- Running time: 123 minutes
- Country: Maldives
- Language: Dhivehi

Nivairoalhi is a 2019 Maldivian film written and directed by Moomin Fuad. Produced by Niuma Mohamed under NiuXo Films, the film stars Yoosuf Shafeeu, Aminath Rishfa, Zeenath Abbas, Ahmed Saeed, Nashidha Mohamed, and Ahmed Azmeel. The film was released on 3 January 2019.

== Premise ==
Mana (Niuma Mohamed) and Riffath (Yoosuf Shafeeu) are a modern dual-career couple, much to the disappointment of their parents, who look forward to a grandchild. Mana returns for a study break from abroad and Riffath observes a distinctive change in her behavior. The relationship between the couple is affected by Mana's mood swings.

== Cast ==
- Niuma Mohamed as Mana Rasheed
- Yoosuf Shafeeu as Riffath Abdul Rahman
- Ahmed Asim as Moosa "Hardy" Haidhar
- Aminath Rishfa as Dr. Shehenaz
- Ahmed Azmeel as Hassan
- Mariyam Shakeela as Arifa, Mana's mother
- Aminath Rasheedha as Waheedha, Riffath's mother
- Ismail Zahir as Abdul Rahman, Riffath's father
- Zeenath Abbas as Nafeesa
- Nashidha Mohamed as Ainth
- Ahmed Saeed as Anwar
- Ahmed Ziya as Doctor
- Mariyam Haleem as Hardy's mother
- Ajnaz Ali
- Ahmed Asif
- Mariyam Zoya Hassan as Nuha (Special appearance)
- Mariyam Shifa (Special appearance)
- Aminath Eshal Rasheed

== Development ==
The film was announced on 20 October 2017 at a grand event held to celebrate Niuma Mohamed's twenty-year career. Releasing the first look of the film, Mohamed declared her "onscreen retirement" and indicated the film to be her last, though she would "still continue to serve in the industry behind the camera". A thirty-second teaser was released on 22 November 2017, featuring a demoralized Mohamed shattering a drinking glass by continuously hitting it on his forehead. Mohamed had earlier worked with director Moomin Fuad in the segment "Baiveriyaa" from the unreleased anthology film Hatharu Halha, which was the first Maldivian anthology film project.

It was earlier projected that filming would begin on 25 January 2018, but it was delayed, citing the need for Mohamed to "gain weight to showcase the perfect physique of the character". Filming commenced on 17 June 2018 on R. Inguraidhoo, for a ten-day schedule. All indoor shots were completed during this schedule and filming for outdoor shots began on 11 July 2018 in Male'. An ensemble cast including Yoosuf Shafeeu, Aminath Rishfa, Zeenath Abbas, Ahmed Saeed, Nashidha Mohamed, Ahmed Azmeel, Mariyam Shakeela, Aminath Rasheedha, and Mariyam Haleem were announced in a promotional event held on 10 April 2018.

== Soundtrack ==
The first song from the film, "Reydhanve Mendhanve Dhandhen", sung by Mira Mohamed Majid and Falih Adam, was released on 21 September 2018. Two promotional songs were released prior to the film's release: Zoya's "Maa Rangalhu Vaaney" and Mira Mohamed Majid's "Sihuru Fadhavi Kamana". The latter, directed and edited by Aishath Rishmy and Ravee Farooq, was shot over eight days and was an instant hit upon release.

Track listing
No.	Title	Lyrics	Music	Singer(s)	Length
1.	"Reydhanve Mendhanve Dhandhen"	Mohamed Abdul Ghanee		Mira Mohamed Majid, Falih Adam	3:18
2.	"Maa Rangalhu Vaaney" (Promotional song)	Mohamed Abdul Ghanee		Zoya Hassan	3:10
3.	"Sihuru Fadhavi Kamana" (Promotional song)	Mohamed Abdul Ghanee	Hussain Sobah	Mira Mohamed Majid, Hussain Sobah	4:43
4.	"Haasve Goiy Husvanee"	Fathuhulla Abdul Fahthah	Fathuhulla Abdul Fahthah	Hawwa Ashra

== Release ==
The film was initially planned to be released on Mohamed's birthday, 20 October 2018. However, the team later accelerated the release date to 19 October 2018 based on fan requests, before pushing it back for an early-2019 release. On 27 September 2018, Mohamed confirmed that dubbing for the film was halted since she was suffering from laryngitis. Hence, the release date of the film was postponed to January 2019.

== Response ==
Nivairoalhi received mostly positive reviews from critics. Aishath Maaha of Dho? favored the performance of the lead actors, particularly praising Ahmed Asim's work. She also mentioned the "neat arrangement" of its screenplay, though she pointed out its "weak ending", saying it was unsatisfactory. Similar sentiments were echoed from Aminath Luba of Sun, who called Asim "outstanding", while other cast members were thought to be "excellent". Luba also found the scene arrangement to be "gripping", while also calling the film's ending "weak".

== Accolades ==
Award	Category	Recipient(s) and nominee(s)	Result	Ref(s)
1st MSPA Film Awards	Best Lead Actor – Male	Yoosuf Shafeeu	Nominated	
1st MSPA Film Awards	Best Lead Actor – Female	Niuma Mohamed	Won	
1st MSPA Film Awards	Best Supporting Actor – Female	Mariyam Shakeela	Nominated	
1st MSPA Film Awards	Best Child Artist	Mariyam Zoya Hassan	Nominated	
1st MSPA Film Awards	Best Story	Moomin Fuad	Nominated	
