= Shivaz Abdulla =

Maldivian cinematographer (born 1981)

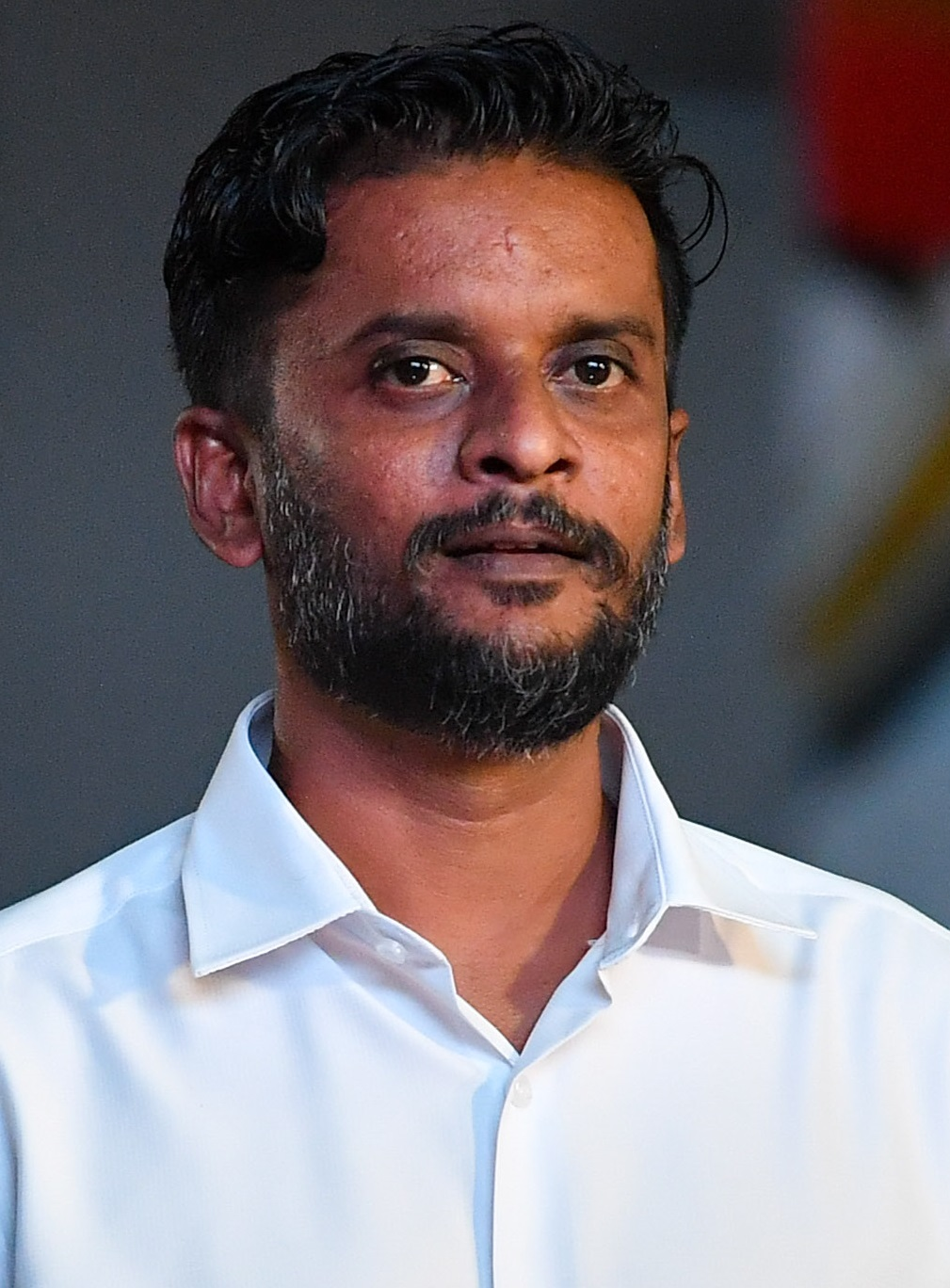
- Born: 6 December 1981 (age 44); Malé
- Occupations: Cinematographer, producer
- Years active: 2008–present

Shivaz Abdulla commonly known as Maaskey (born 6 December 1981) is a Maldivian cinematographer and producer.

== Early life and career ==
Shivaz Abdulla's journey into the entertainment industry was greatly influenced by his family's strong musical background, with his aunt Shafeeqa Abdul Latheef and cousin Mariyam Unoosha being notable figures in the field. His career trajectory began at a local shop called "Chaalee", where he dealt with music rolls and discs, igniting his passion for the industry. After three years there, he transitioned to "Audiomart", a well-known local studio, where he gained valuable experience in the world of filmmaking. During his six-year tenure at Audiomart, Abdulla had the opportunity to connect with various cameramen and producers, forming important relationships within the industry.

During this period, he also participated in a workshop organized by Television Maldives, focusing on cinematography and film direction. Encouraged by his newfound knowledge and enthusiasm, he decided to leave his job and venture into the industry. Initially, he started as an assistant to film crews, helping with equipment and setup. Despite facing initial challenges and working in a technician's role, Abdulla persisted, closely observing the work of seasoned cameramen. His breakthrough came when he collaborated with Abdul Faththaah on a music album shoot, which garnered recognition within the industry.

Abdulla commenced his career by working on smaller projects, including films like Dhanthura (2008), Seedhibe (2009), Loabeege Ninja (2010) and for television series including Soora (2008), Mihithah Loabi Dheyshey (2009), Sirrun Hithaa Kulhelaafa (2010). In 2013, his career took a significant leap when he served as the cameraman for Hussain Munawwar's romantic thriller Dhilakani earning him a nomination for Best Cinematography at the Maldives Film Awards. Another notable achievement came with Ali Seezan's action film Ahsham (2014), for which he received the Gaumee Film Award for Best Cinematography. Reviewing the film, Ahmed Nadheem from Avas praised Abdulla's cinematography, citing it as one of the film's standout features, stating, "It is worth mentioning the young talent in the industry, [Maskey] for his brilliant and unconventional cinematic effects".

Abdulla continued to collaborate with Ali Seezan on Andhirikan, where he not only handled the camera work but also served as a co-producer for the film. The film faced various challenges in the pre-production stage, and after only four screenings due to the COVID-19 pandemic, it was withdrawn from theaters.

== Filmography ==
=== Feature film ===
Year	Title	Producer	Cinematographer	Notes	Ref(s)
2013	Dhilakani		Yes	Nominated—Maldives Film Award for Best Cinematography	
2014	Aniyaa		Yes		
2014	Insaana		Yes		
2015	Ahsham		Yes	Gaumee Film Award for Best Cinematography	
2016	Baiveriyaa		Yes		
2020	Andhirikan	Yes	Yes	Co-produced with Ali Seezan	
2023	Kaushi		Yes	Sinhala film	
2023	Jokaru		Yes		
2023	Zoya		Yes		
2024	Saaya		Yes		
2024	Kamanaa		Yes		

=== Television ===
Year	Title	Producer	Cinematographer	Notes	Ref(s)
2008	Soora		Yes	Television series; 5 episodes	
2009	Mihithah Loabi Dheyshey		Yes	Television series; 15 episodes	
2010	Magey Hithakee Hitheh Noon Hey?		Yes	Digital release; 5 parts	
2010	Sirrun Hithaa Kulhelaafa		Yes	Television series; 10 episodes	
2012	Kaiveni		Yes	Television series; 5 episodes	
2012–2013	Adhives Eloaibah Gadharu Kuran		Yes	Television series; 13 episodes	
2019	Yes Sir		Yes	Web series; 10 episodes	
2021	Avahteriya		Yes	Web series; 9 episodes	
2021	Hatharu Manzaru		Yes	Cinematographer for the segment "Fulhi"	
2021	Giridha		Yes	Web series; 15 episodes	
2022	Dhoadhi		Yes	Web series; 15 episodes	
2022	Hissu		Yes	Web series; 3 episodes	
2022	Bahdhal		Yes	Web series; 3 episodes	
2023	Hayyaru		Yes	Web series; 15 episodes	
2024	Ereahfahu		Yes	Web series; 15 episodes	
2025	Imthihaan		Yes	Web series; 10 episodes	

=== Short film ===
Year	Title	Producer	Cinematographer	Notes
2008	Dhanthura		Yes	
2009	Seedhibe		Yes	
2010	Loabeege Ninja		Yes	
2010	Muhammaage Briefcase		Yes	
2012	13 Ah Visnaa Dhehaas		Yes	Nominated—Gaumee Film Award for Best Cinematography - Short Film; Nominated—Maldives Film Award for Best Cinematography - Short Film
2012	Kidnap		Yes	

== Accolades ==
Year	Award	Category	Nominated work	Result	Ref(s)
2014	3rd Maldives Film Awards	Best Cinematography	Dhilakani	Nominated	
2014	3rd Maldives Film Awards	Best Cinematography - Short Film	13 Ah Visnaa Dhehaas	Nominated	
2017	8th Gaumee Film Awards	Best Cinematography	Ahsham	Won	
2017	8th Gaumee Film Awards	Best Cinematography - Short Film	13 Ah Visnaa Dhehaas	Nominated	
