= 01 January =

2009 film by Yoosuf Shafeeu

- Official film poster
- Directed by: Yoosuf Shafeeu
- Screenplay by: Yoosuf Shafeeu
- Produced by: Yoosuf Shafeeu; Ahmed Wafau
- Starring: Yoosuf Shafeeu; Hamdhan Farooq; Mohamed Rifshan; Yoosuf Zuhuree
- Cinematography: Hussain Munawwar
- Edited by: Yoosuf Shafeeu
- Music by: Ayyuman Shareef
- Production companies: Eupe Productions; Kid Productions
- Release date: 2009
- Running time: 72 minutes
- Country: Maldives
- Language: Dhivehi

01 January is a 2009 Maldivian psychological thriller short film written and directed by Yoosuf Shafeeu. Co-produced by Shafeeu and Ahmed Wafau under Eupe Productions in association with Kids Productions, the film stars Shafeeu, Mohamed Farooq, Mohamed Rifshan and Yoosuf Zuhuree in pivotal roles.

== Premise ==
Two promising surfers (Mohamed Farooq and Mohamed Rifshan) visits an island and stays at a guest room for three days, rented by a short-tempered and peculiar man (Yoosuf Shafeeu). He sets strange rules to be followed by tenants; return home before 11pm, never leave the door open and by no circumstances ever follow him to anywhere. The next day they made a plan to steal a large sum of money in a locked room of the house which Rifshan saw in a dream and interprets it as real since the facts coincides with what their friend who lives in the island says.

== Cast ==
- Yoosuf Shafeeu
- Hamdhan Farooq
- Mohamed Rifshan
- Yoosuf Zuhuree
- Ali Firaq
