= 40+ =

- Official film poster
- Directed by: Yoosuf Shafeeu
- Screenplay by: Yoosuf Shafeeu
- Produced by: Ismail Shafeeq
- Starring: Yoosuf Shafeeu; Ali Seezan; Mohamed Manik; Ahmed Saeed; Sheela Najeeb; Fathimath Azifa
- Cinematography: Ibrahim Moosa
- Edited by: Yoosuf Shafeeu
- Music by: Abdul Basith
- Production companies: Eupe Productions; Shy Productions
- Distributed by: Olympus Cinema
- Release date: March 5, 2019
- Running time: 182 minutes
- Country: Maldives
- Language: Dhivehi

40+ is a 2019 Maldivian horror comedy film written and directed by Yoosuf Shafeeu and the sequel to his previous comedy film Naughty 40 (2017). Produced by Ismail Shafeeq under Eupe Productions, the film stars Yoosuf Shafeeu, Mohamed Manik, Ahmed Saeed and Ali Seezan reprising their role as Ashwanee, Ahsan, Ajwad and Zahid respectively. Fathimath Azifa and Ali Azim were also retained their in the sequel, while Sheela Najeeb, Mohamed Faisal, Ahmed Easa, Mariyam Shakeela, and Mariyam Shifa were added to the cast. The film is scheduled to release on 5 March 2019.

== Plot ==
Four friends, Ashvani, Zahid, Ajwad and Ahsan plan to open a guest house in the outskirt of the island by converting an old ruined house. Their business permit is put on hold by the corrupt councilor Saiman. Despite being married and in their 40s, Zahid, Ajwad and Ahsan have crushes on young girls. Zahid and Ajwad are unhappy with their wives. Zahid's wife, Zarifa gets attacks in between and beats the person in front of her. Ajwad's wife, Thaniya is a fitness freak, who is overly possessive about fitness. Both Zahid and Ajwad have crush on a girl named Shamra, whose father owns the land they want to buy. Ahsan is married to a younger woman but his wife is not happy with their marriage. He has a crush on Saiman's sister, Mishka.

After the friends complain to the higher authorities, Saiman is forced to release the permit. Saiman takes help from a bully, Akram who also has a crush on Mishka, to spread rumors about the house being haunted, in exchange for Mishka's hand in marriage. Unknown to them the house is actually haunted by a jinn named Laila, who wants a husband. At first, the friends let her stay thinking her as a helpless girl. One night, Ashvani takes Ahsan to spy on Zubeiru, Saiman's sidekick, who accompanies him everywhere. In reality, Saiman goes to meet his girlfriend who is Ahsan's wife and Zubeiru helps them cover up. Akram and his friend Nadheem see Zubeiru and decide to prank him. However their prank backfires and Zubeiru along with Nadheem on his back fall on Akram. Ashvani and Ahsan saw the incident and remain disgusted from what they saw.

Mishka proposes to Ashvani for marriage, whereas Zarifa and Thaniya date the salesboy from Ahsan's shop. Zahid and Ajwad along with Ahsan's help disguise themselves and catch their wives red handed. Laila's identity as a jinn is revealed. Ashvani get stuck in the haunted house until he is married to Laila. Ahsan takes help from a sorceress Gumeyra to free Ashvani. Laila drives Saiman crazy for spreading rumors about her house. Zarifa and Thaniya seek forgiveness from their respective husbands, which both Zahid and Ajwad accept. Gumeyra's exorcism fails when Zarifa comes in between and Laila possess her. During the final exorcism, Ashvani offers Saiman to Laila as her supposed husband. The film ends with everyone laughing.

== Cast ==
- Yoosuf Shafeeu as Ashvani
- Ali Seezan as Zahidh
- Mohamed Manik as Ajwad
- Ahmed Saeed as Ahsan
- Sheela Najeeb as Zarifa
- Fathimath Azifa as Thaniya
- Mohamed Faisal as Akram
- Ali Azim as Nadheem
- Ahmed Easa as Saiman
- Mariyam Shakeela as Gumeyra
- Ali Shahid as Zubeiru
- Mariyam Shifa as Laila
- Irufana Ibrahim as Shamra
- Hunaisha Adam Naseer as Mishka
- Aminath Ziyadha as Fazna
- Aishath Sam'aa as Shaira
- Ahmed Bassam as Fairooz
- Mariyam Azza in the item number "Lailaa" (Special appearance)

== Development ==
A sequel to Yoosuf Shafeeu's commercially successful comedy film Naughty 40 (2017) was announced on 31 October 2017. Despite its prequel being a comedy film, the spin off was reported to include horror elements in the film, marking the first of its genre; horror comedy, in Maldivian film industry. It was believed that the film will retain majority of the cast from its prequel with inclusion of additional actors including Sheela Najeeb, Mohamed Faisal and Mariyam Shifa. A casting call was opened on 3 December 2017 to an "overwhelming" response which resulted in five new faces to join the cast post audition of over hundred candidates. Filming was commenced on 23 December 2017 in Th. Burunee scheduled to be completed within twenty five days. Shooting of the film was completed on 21 January 2018.

== Soundtrack ==
Track listing
No.	Title	Lyrics	Music	Singer(s)	Length
1.	"Chaalu Zuvana"	Mohamed Abdul Ghanee	Hassan Jalaal	Hassan Tholaq
2.	"Lailaa"	Mohamed Abdul Ghanee	Hassan Jalaal	Aminath Lamha Latheef

== Release ==
The film was initially planned to release on 1 August 2018 though they pushed the release date to the following year citing the political instability in the country in relation to 2018 Maldivian presidential election. The trailer of the film was released on 24 November 2018 while announcing the release date as 27 February 2019. However, it was again postponed to 5 March 2019 since the Olympus was being occupied during the period for an event organized by National Centre for the Arts.

== Accolades ==
Award	Category	Recipient(s) and nominee(s)	Result	Ref(s)
1st MSPA Film Awards	Best Debut – Male	Ahmed Bassam	Nominated	
1st MSPA Film Awards	Best Original Screenplay	Yoosuf Shafeeu	Nominated	
1st MSPA Film Awards	Best Makeup – Special Effects	Fathimath Shizna	Nominated	
1st MSPA Film Awards	Best Costume Designer	Jadhulla Ismail	Nominated	
1st MSPA Film Awards	Background Score	Abdul Basith	Nominated	
