= Haasaa =

Maldivian web series

- Screenplay by: Aishath Shazleen
- Story by: Aishath Shazleen
- Directed by: Mohamed Manik
- Starring: Fathimath Azifa; Ali Shameel
- Music by: Shaaz
- Country of origin: Maldives
- Original language: Dhivehi
- No. of seasons: 1
- No. of episodes: 13

Production
- Cinematography: Various Arts Studio

Original release
- Release: 14 November 2019 – 7 February 2020

Haasaa is a Maldivian television series directed by Mohamed Manik and streamed through Baiskoafu. The series stars Fathimath Azifa, Ali Shameel, Ibrahim Jihad, Mariyam Shifa, Sobah, Mujuthaba and Shifana in pivotal roles. The series revolves around a modern young girl (played by Azifa) and the fallout in her life after her live in relationship with an older man (played by Shameel).

== Cast ==
=== Main ===
- Fathimath Azifa as Nima
- Ali Shameel as Ramzy
- Ibrahim Jihad as Rifau
- Mariyam Shifa as Mizna
- Sobah as Farish
- Mujuthaba as Mihad
- Aishath Shifana as Ziyadha

=== Recurring ===
- Fathimath Latheefa as Maree
- Ali Yooshau as Ammadey
- Mariyam Haleem as Abidha
- Jauza as Shifa
- Junad as Ibrahim
- Mumthaz as Seytu

=== Guest ===
- Sheela Najeeb as Shiya (Episode 13)

== Episodes ==
No. in season	Title	Directed by	Original release date
1	"Episode 1"	Mohamed Manik	14 November 2019
Nima (Fathimath Azifa), a modern young girl who recently moved to an island accepts a bet to lure an old aged wealthy businessman, Ramzy (Ali Shameel) into her trap, within a week.
2	"Episode 2"	Mohamed Manik	19 November 2019
Nima initiates a meeting with Ramzy which goes well according to her plan.
3	"Episode 3"	Mohamed Manik	27 November 2019
A night prior to her departure, Nima meets Ramzy who proposes her to go for a live in relationship with him, to which she ultimately agrees. The very night, Ramzy catches her a little intimate with his younger brother, Rifau (Ibrahim Jihad).
4	"Episode 4"	Mohamed Manik	4 December 2019
Nima starts experiencing hallucinations and delusions. Ziyadha (Shifana) a rival of Nima's best friend, Mizna (Mariyam Shifa) hears a rumor that her husband is having an affair with the latter.
5	"Episode 5"	Mohamed Manik	11 December 2019
The painkillers Nima take from Rifau have a side effects on her which worsen her paranoia. Mizna is concerned about Nima's reputation and welfare.
6	"Episode 6"	Mohamed Manik	18 December 2019
Nima starts experiencing paranormal experiences inside the house. Ramzy, while out of island for an office trip is unable to contact her. A rumor breaks in the island with regards to Nima and Rifau.
7	"Episode 7"	Mohamed Manik	25 December 2019
Ziyadha spies on her husband to confirm her suspicions. Nima’s annoying neighbor, Abidha (Mariyam Haleem) confirms hearing the sound of a woman crying in her house.
8	"Episode 8"	Mohamed Manik	31 December 2019
Nima inquires about the relationship history of Ramzy to which Rifau denies any, except for his wife. One night, intoxicated, Nima and Rifau share an intimate moment.
9	"Episode 9"	Mohamed Manik	7 January 2020
Ziyadha’s husband is left in a difficult situation due to her invasion of privacy. Rifau convinces Nima that she is experiencing nothing but a bad trip. Ramzy makes a surprise return to the island.
10	"Episode 10"	Mohamed Manik	14 January 2020
Nima decides to discontinue the affair with her soon to be brother-in-law. The catfight between Ziyadha and Mizna continues.
11	"Episode 11"	Mohamed Manik	21 January 2020
12	"Episode 12"	Mohamed Manik	27 January 2020
13	"Episode 13"	Mohamed Manik	7 February 2020

== Reception ==
The first episode of the series met with positive reviews from critics, where Ahmed Rasheed from MuniAvas complimented the acting ability of Fathimath Azifa.
