= Ereahfahu =

Maldivian web series

- Written by: Mariyam Moosa
- Screenplay by: Mariyam Moosa
- Directed by: Yoosuf Shafeeu
- Starring: Yoosuf Shafeeu; Aminath Rashfa; Ibrahim Jihad; Mariyam Shifa
- Music by: Shy Production
- Country of origin: Maldives
- Original language: Divehi
- No. of seasons: 1
- No. of episodes: 15

Production
- Producer: Mohamed Abdulla
- Cinematography: Shivaz Abdulla
- Editor: Yoosuf Shafeeu
- Running time: 23-35 minutes
- Production company: Dheke Dhekeves Productions

Original release
- Release: July 11 – October 3, 2024

Ereahfahu is a Maldivian crime thriller web series produced by Mohamed Abdulla and directed by Yoosuf Shafeeu. It stars Shafeeu, Aminath Rashfa, Ibrahim Jihad, and Mariyam Shifa. The pilot episode was released on 11 July 2024.

== Premise ==
Inaya, a nurse, visits the newly recruited doctor, Lyle, and immediately senses something off about him and his family. She feels an eerie presence stalking her, and at night, she hears the chilling sound of grave digging. Meanwhile, her best friend, Wajeeh, a police officer, starts having strange visions of Inaya with a child, pushing him to investigate the island’s recent supernatural occurrences. Fearing something beyond logic, he calls upon a sorcerer, Qasim for help.

Lyle, despite being married to Sara, feels an inexplicable connection to Inaya. Every attempt to recall their past encounters is met with blocked memories, as if something is keeping the truth hidden. As tensions rise, Qasim, joins them in uncovering the reality behind their visions. Piece by piece, they unravel a long-buried past—one of forgotten love, trapped souls, and a fate manipulated by forces beyond their control.

== Cast and characters ==
=== Main ===
- Yoosuf Shafeeu as Dr. Lyle
- Aminath Rashfa as Inaya / Inasha
- Ibrahim Jihad as Ibrahim Wajeeh
- Mariyam Shifa as Sara

=== Recurring ===
- Yoosuf Zuhuree as Qasim
- Ramiza as Bodu Dhaitha

=== Guest ===
- Shifaz Abdulla as Patient
- Ahmed Athoof as Police Assistant
- Nihal as Police Officer
- Ibrahim Naseer as Delivery Boy

== Episodes ==
| No. | Title | Directed by | Original release date |
|---|---|---|---|
| 1 | "Digging Sounds" | Yoosuf Shafeeu | July 11, 2024 |
Inaya visits the newly recruited doctor, Lyle, and is stunned to learn that his wife is Sara—who is equally shocked to see Inaya. Later, Inaya visits her aunt, who questions her about her husband, but she remains silent. On her way home, she hears mysterious digging at the cemetery but only finds a stray cat. Uneasy, she starts feeling as if someone is following her.
| 2 | "Empty Frame" | Yoosuf Shafeeu | July 11, 2024 |
Sara, an overprotective wife, grows jealous of Inaya. Inaya continues to hear digging sounds at the cemetery, even during the daytime. One day, Lyle offers her a ride, but she is startled when Lyle knows her whereabouts without her telling him, which also surprises Lyle. Meanwhile, Wajeeh, a policeman, follows a suspicious man who suddenly attacks him and escapes. That night, Inaya has a disturbing dream of a mysterious man burying a woman similar to her in the backyard of her house.
| 3 | "Drop of Blood" | Yoosuf Shafeeu | July 18, 2024 |
Inaya senses a mysterious presence in her house, making her uneasy. Wajeeh shares his recent encounter, and Inaya suspects they are being followed by the same person, though he dismisses any supernatural connection. Meanwhile, Sara, Lyle’s short-tempered wife, refuses to leave the house, and the island residents remain unaware of their marriage and child. When Inaya casually mentions Lyle’s birthday, he questions how she knew, forcing her to cover up by claiming she saw it in hospital records.
| 4 | "Abandoned House" | Yoosuf Shafeeu | July 25, 2024 |
While at Lyle’s house, Inaya asks him to call his wife, but Sara refuses to come out. Lyle then invites Inaya for an evening outing, and she agrees. During their meeting, he hallucinates, seeing a strange mark on her hand that later vanishes. Inaya reveals that she is married to a doctor, but her husband took another wife because she couldn’t bear children. As they talk about their past, Lyle grows more intrigued and asks to meet her again.
| 5 | "Newborn" | Yoosuf Shafeeu | August 1, 2024 |
Wajeeh discovers Fareed’s body buried in an abandoned house while searching for the missing delivery boy. Inaya tells Wajeeh that Fareed had also heard the mysterious digging sound the day before he disappeared and had followed it, catching a glimpse of a dark figure. Suspicious of Sara, Lyle begins to believe she swapped a file that Inaya had initially brought with another one.
| 6 | "The News" | Yoosuf Shafeeu | August 8, 2024 |
Wajeeh is deeply disturbed by recent events—finding Fareed’s body, hallucinating figures on the road, and feeling constantly followed. His fear intensifies when he sees Inaya holding a newborn baby, leaving him feverish and wary of her. Meanwhile, Lyle persistently asks about Inaya’s husband, but she avoids giving a direct answer. Inaya, in turn, questions Lyle about his wife, subtly suggesting he should verify whether she truly exists.
| 7 | "The Double" | Yoosuf Shafeeu | August 15, 2024 |
During her night shift, Inaya hears someone calling her name and follows the voice to the hospital’s backyard, where she is attacked—only to wake up realizing it was a dream. She finds herself in a hospital bed, where Lyle shocks her with the news that she is pregnant, though she has no memory of how it happened. Meanwhile, Sara’s jealousy intensifies, and when Lyle compares her to Inaya, she furiously warns him that if given another chance, she will kill them both.
| 8 | "Maternity List" | Yoosuf Shafeeu | August 22, 2024 |
Sara confronts Inaya, cryptically revealing that they have met before and share a connection deeper than Inaya realizes. She claims that they both love the same person and laments being unable to get closer, as if held back by an invisible force. Wajeeh gives Inaya an amulet for protection and urges her to wear it constantly. She later offers the amulet to Lyle, but he insists she keep it and pointedly repeats his question about the identity of her unborn child's father.
| 9 | "The Return" | Yoosuf Shafeeu | August 29, 2024 |
A mysterious spirit, disguised as Lyle, visits Inaya, seeking forgiveness for a past encounter. Shortly after, the real Lyle arrives and asks if she met Sara, which she denies. Suspicious, Inaya confronts Lyle about why he lied about her pregnancy, but he remains evasive. Meanwhile, Lyle struggles with recurring dreams that feel like memories, yet they contradict reality. Wajeeh, determined to uncover the truth, theorizes that the strange events began after a specific night and asks Lyle to compile a list of all newborns since his arrival on the island.
| 10 | "List" | Yoosuf Shafeeu | September 5, 2024 |
Inaya compiles the list of newborns and hands it to Wajeeh and Lyle, only to shock them both when her own name appears. This contradicts her earlier claim that she cannot conceive. The revelation triggers Wajeeh’s memory of a dream where he saw Inaya with a child. Suspiciously, no one has ever seen Inaya’s husband, adding to the mystery. Soon after, Inaya goes missing, and a chilling message written in blood appears, reading: "I have returned".
| 11 | "Ina's Child" | Yoosuf Shafeeu | September 11, 2024 |
Wajeeh keeps having unsettling dreams of Inaya with a child. Troubled, he revisits the file Lyle gave him and is shocked to find Inaya’s name on another list from the island where Lyle previously worked. Dismissing it as a mistake, he returns the file to Lyle. Meanwhile, Lyle grows increasingly disturbed, feeling a deep connection to Inaya but struggling to recall any memories of their past encounters.
| 12 | "Deception" | Yoosuf Shafeeu | September 19, 2024 |
Wajeeh gives an amulet to Lyle, who unexpectedly asks for two more—for his wife and child—leaving Wajeeh surprised. When questioned, Wajeeh shares that he was once married to Inaya’s cousin and has a five-year-old child. He subtly hints at having feelings for Inaya, adding to the tension. Meanwhile, Lyle grows increasingly suspicious of Sara due to her strange behavior.
| 13 | "Reflection" | Yoosuf Shafeeu | September 26, 2024 |
Wajeeh takes Inaya out for her birthday and, during their time together, asks her to divorce her mysterious husband. Later that night, she sees something unsettling and faints. Confused with what the sorcerer, Qasim said, Wajeeh questions Inaya about her siblings, and she shockingly reveals that she had a twin sister, Inasha. She then hands her phone to Wajeeh, telling him to open it if he wants answers to all his questions.
| 14 | "Doubts" | Yoosuf Shafeeu | October 3, 2024 |
Wajeeh opens the phone and finds a photo of Inaya and Lyle together, deepening the mystery. When he confronts Inaya, she abruptly leaves. Meanwhile, Sara grows furious upon seeing Lyle wearing the amulet and reveals that Lyle’s father once tried to separate them using a similar charm. She then shocks him by confessing that she could only be with him after he murdered Inaya. Lyle is horrified to realize that Sara is visible only to him. At Qasim’s request, Wajeeh brings Lyle to his house. Later, when Wajeeh presses Inaya about the photo, she finally confesses that Inaya was murdered—she is actually Inasha, disguised as her twin to uncover the truth.
| 15 | "The Unfolds" | Yoosuf Shafeeu | October 10, 2024 |
Qasim lifts the curse on Lyle and reveals that Inasha possesses supernatural abilities due to her father being a Jinn married to a human. As Lyle struggles with fragmented memories, he begins recalling his marriage to Inaya and the events leading to her murder, which finally start making sense of his visions and dreams. Sara appears, warning Inasha that she will kill her if she tries to separate her from Lyle. She then reveals how she manipulated Lyle into murdering Inaya. Determined to end Sara’s control, Inasha uses her powers to overpower and bring Sara under her spell.

== Development ==
The project was announced in June 2024, as a murder mystery and suspense thriller web series consisting of fifteen episodes. The series written by Mariyam Moosa and directed by Yoosuf Shafeeu was reported to feature Aminath Rashfa, Ibrahim Jihad and Mariyam Shifa alongside Shafeeu in the role. Filming took place in K. Thulusdhoo.

== Reception ==
The first episode of the series was released on 11 July 2024. Upon release, it mainly received positive reviews from critics, for its intriguing screenplay and the powerful performances of the lead actors including Yoosuf Shafeeu, Aminath Rashfa, Mariyam Shifa and Ibrahim Jihad.
