= Saaya (2024 film) =

2024 Maldivian film

- Official film poster
- Directed by: Yoosuf Shafeeu
- Screenplay by: Yoosuf Shafeeu
- Produced by: Ismail Shafeeq
- Starring: Yoosuf Shafeeu; Ibrahim Jihad; Aminath Rashfa
- Cinematography: Shivaz Abdulla
- Edited by: Yoosuf Shafeeu
- Music by: Ayyuman Shareef
- Production companies: Shy Productions; Eupe Productions
- Release date: 7 August 2024
- Country: Maldives
- Language: Dhivehi

Saaya is a 2024 Maldivian romantic horror film directed by Yoosuf Shafeeu. Produced by Ismail Shafeeq under Shy Productions, the film stars Yoosuf Shafeeu, Ibrahim Jihad and Aminath Rashfa in pivotal roles. The film was released on 7 August 2024. It follows a newlywed couple whose honeymoon on an uninhabited island is disrupted by a vengeful spirit.

== Premise ==
A newlywed couple, travel to a secluded, uninhabited island for their honeymoon. Their time together is disrupted when a third person, comes to their life. His presence complicates their relationship, creating suspicious and jealousy between the men. As tensions rise, they start to hear strange noises and experience unsettling events, unaware that the island harbors a dark past.

Years ago, a woman was brutally killed while being assaulted on the very same island, and her vengeful spirit has haunted it ever since. The ghost stirs confusion and chaos, feeding on the couple’s growing mistrust and fear. As the island becomes engulfed in a supernatural riot, they must confront the spirit’s wrath and unravel the tragic history of the island.

== Cast ==
- Yoosuf Shafeeu
- Ibrahim Jihad
- Aminath Rashfa as Saaya
- Shaheedha Ahmed
- Mohamed Manik
- Ahmed Nimal

== Development ==
Following the success of Kalhaki (2023), Yoosuf Shafeeu announced another horror film in June 2024, directed and starring Shafeeu. The main cast also includes Aminath Rashfa and Ibrahim Jihad. Filming took place in R. Maakurathu. Filming schedule was disrupted and rescheduled three times due to bad weather. All scenes were shot outdoor in the jungle of Maakurathu.

== Soundtrack ==
Track listing
No.	Title	Singer(s)	Length
1.	"Thee Hithuge Vindhey"	Mohamed Abdul Ghanee, Mariyam Ashfa

== Release and reception ==
The film was released on 7 August 2024 and received mixed to positive reviews from critics. Ahmed Hameed Adam from Minoos praised the technical aspects of the film, including the cinematography by Shivaz Abdulla, background music by Ayyuman Shareef and screenplay by Yoosuf Shafeeu. However, Adam found the climax lackluster due to its open-ended conclusion. Ahmed Nadheem from Mihaaru commended Shafeeu's overall work on the film despite the loopholes in the plot, overdramatic dialogues and overacting by some cast members.
