= Mee Ishq =

- Official title poster
- Directed by: Azhan Ibrahim
- Written by: Azhan Ibrahim
- Screenplay by: Azhan Ibrahim
- Produced by: Leenaz Hussain
- Starring: Sharaf Abdulla; Aminath Rashfa
- Cinematography: Ahmed Zifaaf
- Edited by: Azhan Ibrahim
- Music by: Shahyd Legacy
- Release date: 6 January 2024
- Country: Maldives
- Language: Dhivehi

Mee Ishq is a 2024 Maldivian film written and directed by Azhan Ibrahim. Produced by Leenaz Hussain, the film stars Sharaf Abdulla and Aminath Rashfa in pivotal roles. The film was released on 6 January 2024.

== Premise ==
The film centers around Ariz and Saba, who cross paths during their separate journeys to K. Maaufshi, where they coincidentally book the same room in a guesthouse. The trip transforms into a memorable experience as it sparks a romantic connection between them. However, after the journey, Saba loses all contact with Ariz. The film unfolds the narrative of how destiny reunites them and how fate intertwines their lives with misfortune.

== Cast ==
- Sharaf Abdulla as Ariz
- Aminath Rashfa as Saba
- Ahmed Sharif as Naaif
- Fathimath Visama as Maisha
- Ahmed Jilyan Rashaad as Dhaain
- Aman Ali as Furugan
- Ahmed Abaan Nazim as Falah
- Aminath Rasheedha as Saba's mother
- Mohamed Rasheed as MP Saeed; Ariz's father
- Fathimath Latheefa

== Development ==
Following the success of the romantic film Hindhukolheh (2023), on 12 March 2023 Dark Rain Entertainment announced another romantic film starring Sharaf Abdulla and Aminath Rashfa in lead roles titled Mee Ishq. Script was finalized in March 2023 while songs composition and pre-production work was completed by April 2023. The film was announced to be directed by Azhan Ibrahim as his directorial debut in a feature film. Principal photography of the film commenced on 4 May 2023 and was completed in November 2023. Filming mainly took place in Male' and K. Maafushi and was completed in November 2023.

== Soundtrack ==
Track listing
No.	Title	Lyrics	Music	Singer(s)	Length
1.	"Mee Ishq" (Title song)	Ali Inaan Saeed	Shahyd Legacy	Ali Inaan Saeedh, Aishath Maain Rasheed	5:48
2.	"Annaashey Udhuhilaa"	Ali Inaan Saeedh	Shahyd Legacy	Ali Inaan Saeedh	4:00
3.	"Shaahy Lolugaa" (Promotional song)	Azhan Ibrahim	Shahyd Legacy	Mohamed Abdul Ghanee, Mariyam Ashfa	3:42

== Release ==
Mee Ishq was theatrically released on 6 January 2024. Following its release, the film garnered mixed to positive reviews from critics.

In addition to the comical duo Furugan and Falah, portrayed by Aman Ali and Ahmed Abaan Nazim, Aminath Luba from The Press lauded the performances of Aminath Rashfa and Sharaf Abdulla, describing them as their career-best. While Luba appreciated the technical aspects of the film, including cinematography, editing, and music, she criticized the synopsis of the first half for its resemblance to the romantic comedy film Love in the Villa (2022) directed by Mark Steven Johnson. Aisha Eman from Dhauru echoed similar sentiments about the film, emphasizing the lead actor's performance, the comedic scenes featuring Aman and Abaan, and the noteworthy music.
