= Aminath Rashfa =

Maldivian actress

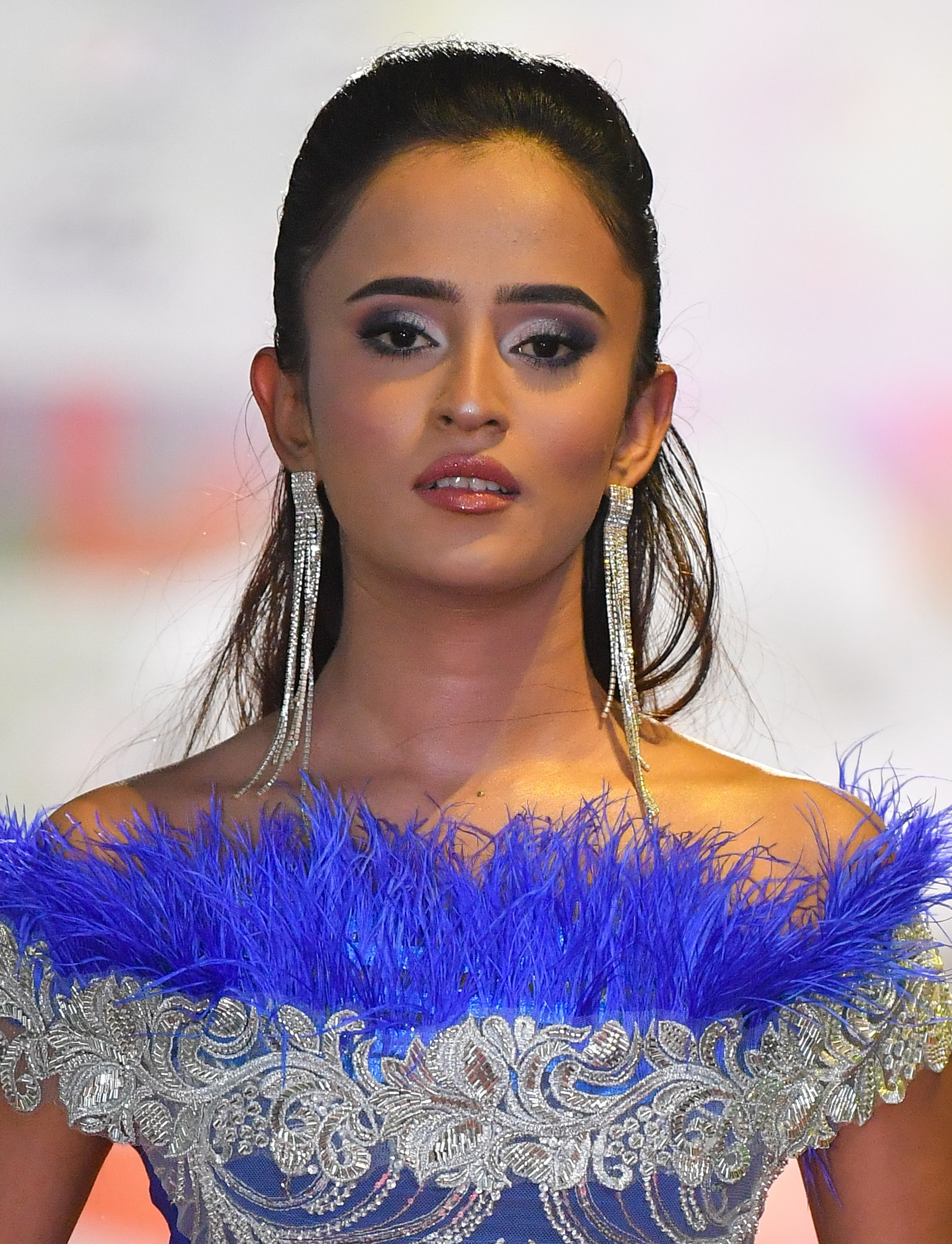
- Rashfa attending Olympus reopening ceremony, 2023
- Born: 16 September 1998 (age 27); GDh. Gadhdhoo, Maldives
- Occupation: Actress
- Years active: 2019–present

Aminath Rashfa commonly known as Aashaa (born 16 September 1998) is a Maldivian film actress.

== Career ==
After completing a diploma in aviation from a Sri Lankan-based institution, Rashfa moved back to Male' and was influenced by the TikTok trend, where she became an active TikTok user, which enabled her to showcase her talent as a performer. She was then offered to play a supporting tole in Ahmed Sinan-directed crime thriller Goh Raalhu (2019) which centers around the criminality and misdemeanor a young man has to deal with while trying to prove his truest intention of love. Upon release, the film received widespread positive reviews from critics; Aminath Luba of Sun called it a "five-star worthy blockbuster film" and wrote: "The fresh faces including [Rashfa] pulls their respective roles with much expertise".

In 2021, she again worked with Dark Rain Entertainment for their romantic comedy web series Giritee Loabi, where she played the role of Noora, the only child of a protective father who struggles to align her introvert boyfriend and her father. The following year she starred in Ahmed Asim's segment titled Firimaru from the crime suspense anthology web series Vihaali, where she played the role of a cashier working at a restaurant and how her life changes after a one-night stand with a customer.

In 2023, Rashfa collaborated with Dark Rain Entertainment for two other films. The first release, Beeveema revolves around the reunion of former students twenty-two years after their graduation and how this reunion changes the perspective of two childhood lovers about life and separation. Aminath Luba from The Press called her an "aspiring actress proving her worth in the industry". This is followed by Ali Shifau-directed romantic film Hindhukolheh opposite Sharaf Abdulla, which narrates the story of a young girl about her love and self-discovery after her recent memory loss.

== Filmography ==
=== Feature film ===
Year	Title	Role	Notes	Ref(s)
2019	Goh Raalhu	Niusha		
2023	Beeveema	Raniya		
2023	Hindhukolheh	Kiara		
2024	Mee Ishq	Saba		
2024	Saaya	Saaya		
2024	Kamanaa	Nora		

=== Television ===
Year	Title	Role	Notes	Ref(s)
2021–2022	Giritee Loabi	Noora	Main role; 22 episodes	
2022	Vihaali	Aisha	Main role in the segment "Firimaru"	
2023	Yaaraa	Aasha	Guest role; "Episode 1 & 50"	
2024	Ereahfahu	Inaya / Inasha	Main role; 15 episodes	

=== Short film ===
Year	Title	Role	Notes	Ref(s)
2021	Gulhun	Yasmine		

== Accolades ==
Year	Award	Category	Nominated work	Result	Ref(s)
2025	1st MSPA Film Awards	Best Debut – Female	Goh Raalhu	Nominated	
