= Naughty Forty =

Football hooligan firm

Naughty Forty (Naughty 40 or N40) is a football hooligan firm linked to the English team Stoke City F.C.

== Background ==
At their height, the firm had over 700 members and were among the more violent football hooligan firms in England.

In January 1998, dozens of hooligans invaded the pitch at the club's new Britannia Stadium at the end of a 7–0 Division One defeat by Birmingham City and several seats were thrown onto the pitch. This was one of several traumatic events in one of the worst seasons in the club's history, as they were relegated from Division One at the end of it.

On 21 October 2001, 84 people were arrested after rival fans clashed at Stoke City's local Potteries derby with Port Vale. Violence broke out in the streets around Vale Park in the Burslem district of Stoke. There were two pitch invasions and fans from both clubs threw missiles at each other. About 300 police officers were drafted in to keep the peace. On 29 December hooligans from the Naughty Forty and another firm associated with the club the Under 5's fought with hooligans from Huddersfield Town in Huddersfield. In the worst incident Stoke fans smashed up and set fire to the White Hart pub, causing extensive damage.

On 28 April 2002, Stoke City played Cardiff City at home. Staffordshire Police mounted a large operation and had to call in officers from other forces and around 1,000 officers were on duty on the day. The match had to be halted for seven minutes as the police attempted to arrest Stoke hooligans in the ground. After the game police were pelted with stones, and Cardiff City chairman Sam Hammam had his car vandalised.

On 1 May, violence again erupted between hooligans of the two clubs when they met in a Division Two play-off match. Five people were arrested as trouble erupted after Cardiff lost the match, when hooligans from both clubs confronted each othert outside Ninian Park. Three police officers needed hospital treatment following disturbances while a number of others suffered minor injuries. Officers using batons struggled to keep the two sets of fans apart as missiles, including stones, bottles and fence posts, were thrown from the Cardiff side.

Former N40 founding members, Mark Chester & Paul Griffiths wrote a book about their exploits with the firm in 2006 stating that he was a reformed character, and that they were proud of their past, having moved on from the violence of football hooliganism.
