= Medianet =

Pay television operator in the Maldives

- Type: Private Limited
- Industry: Pay TV
- Founded: 2005
- Headquarters: Malé, Maldives
- Area served: Nationwide Maldives
- Website: medianet.mv

Medianet is the largest Pay TV and cable TV operator in the Maldives. The company was established as a subsidiary of the Maldives Electronic Services Company in 2001 as CableNET. Today the company is the leading Pay TV provider in all the atolls of the country, providing more than 90 TV channels today. The company renewed itself in 2010, with the launch of ‘MediaNet Digital’; through which a high-definition television and a personal video recorder service were introduced. MediaNet includes channels that hold broadcasting rights for major football leagues. This makes it the exclusive platform for live matches, highlights, and related content, ensuring fans have access to comprehensive football coverage.

== Services availability ==
The service is available in Malé, Hulhumale, the nearby island of Kaafu Atoll, Addu City and Fuahmulah. Medianet is now available nationwide across the Maldives.

== History ==
CableNet started in 2000 with one MMDS Station located at the centre of Malé. The company was officially established in the year 2001. When the government granted permission to expand CableNET’s services in 2002, the company provided decoders to its customers and provided connection kits for installment at homes

=== CableNET and CableVision Merger ===
By 2005, MESCO’s CableNET was the leading cable provider in the Maldives, with J-SAT’s Cable Vision, the second cable provider closely behind. Nevertheless, due to financial problems, the two cable TV providers merged that year to form Multi Service Operator Pvt. Ltd. Due to the merger, the two companies were able to spread throughout the country at a faster speed and provide more channels.

==== Suspension ====
In that same year, it was discovered by the ministry that the Multi Service Operator Pvt. Ltd was operating without a license from the ministry, thus illegally. Even though the company had been discarded, the service was allowed to stay on air since it was a public television network.

==== MediaNET ====
In late 2005, J-SAT's CableVision and MESCO's CableNET merged once again, to form MediaNET, which was registered by the ministry.

=== 2007 antenna collapse ===
On 27 May 2007, the main cable television headend that distributes the TV signals for Malé fell down. The 100-foot antenna had snapped 10 feet from the top due to violent weather conditions that day. service to the neighboring islands were halted for some time due to this incident. The company was able to fix the antenna for use in Malé within 6 hours.
