= Naughty 40 (film) =

- Official film poster
- Directed by: Yoosuf Shafeeu
- Written by: Ismail Shafeeq
- Screenplay by: Yoosuf Shafeeu
- Produced by: Niuma Mohamed; Ismail Shafeeq
- Starring: Yoosuf Shafeeu; Mohamed Manik; Ahmed Saeed
- Cinematography: Ibrahim Moosa
- Edited by: Yoosuf Shafeeu
- Music by: Abdul Basith
- Production company: Envision Entertainment
- Release date: August 2, 2017
- Country: Maldives
- Language: Dhivehi

Naughty 40 is a 2017 Maldivian comedy film written, edited and directed by Yoosuf Shafeeu. Produced by Niuma Mohamed and Ismail Shafeeq under Envision Entertainment, the film stars Shafeeu, Mohamed Manik and Ahmed Saeed in pivotal roles. The film was released on 2 April 2017.

== Plot ==
The film follows three friends, Ashwanee (Yoosuf Shafeeu), Ahsan (Ahmed Saeed) and Ajwad (Mohamed Manik) who are single and in their forties. Ashwanee, s girlfriend fled before they could marry. Divorcee Ajwad is bringing up his son, Jawad. Ahsan's wife died after giving birth to a boy. Nineteen years later, a man comes to Ashwanee to hand over a girl named Ashwa (Mariyam Azza), this being the final wish of her mother, Ziyaana. Ashwanee sees that Ashwa looks exactly like her mother. Ajwad's son invites him to the island where he has his business. Ajwad brings his two friends and their children. On the island, Ajwad, Ahsan and Ashwanee decide to mark their '40s' by dating younger girls from the island. However, Ajwad's business rival, Gulistan plans to scupper his business with the assistance of Zahid, the chief police officer of the island, and her younger sister Taniya (Fathimath Azifa).

In the climax Ajwad's ex-wife Niufa comes to reveal that Ashwa is Ajwad and Ziyaana's daughter. After knowing this Niufa refuse to live with Ajwad until he accept Ashwa as his daughter which later result in there divorce. All this years Niufa was looking after Ashwa after Ziyaana's death and according to Ziyaana's last wish, Niufa wants Ashwa to get her birth right. This is when Zahid reveal that it was he who is Ashwa's father. The film ends with Zahid accepting Ashwa as his daughter.

== Cast ==
- Yoosuf Shafeeu as Ashwanee
- Ahmed Saeed as Ahsan
- Mohamed Manik as Ajwad
- Fathimath Azifa as Taniya
- Ali Azim as Hassan
- Mariyam Azza as Ashwa
- Ali Seezan as Zahid
- Ibrahim Jihad as Shamin
- Nuzuhath Shuaib as Zoya
- Gulisthan Mohamed as Gulisthan
- Niuma Mohamed as Niufa
- Mohamed Rifshan as Hanim
- Ahmed Shareef as Jawad
- Hassan Liam
- Maria Teresa Pagano as dancer in item number "farudhaa nunagadhey"

== Reception ==
Naughty 40 garnered generally positive reviews from critics. Aishath Maaha of Avas favored the film specifically mentioning the comic timing of the characters and acting of the leads. However, Maaha opined that the "film is excessively long" and some scenes can be edited out. The film met with both critical and commercial success, emerging as one of the highest grossing Maldivian films of 2017.

== Soundtrack ==
Track listing
No.	Title	Lyrics	Singer(s)	Length
1.	"Thedhey Anbin Reehchey"	Adam Haleem Adnan	Ahmed Nimal
2.	"Nala Nala Insaanaa"	Adam Haleem Adnan	Hassan Ilham, Shifa Thaufeeq
3.	"Kamana Reethikamunney"	Ahmed Haleem	Hassan Ilham
4.	"Farudhaa Nagan Noolheyshey"	Mohamed Abdul Ghanee	Mohamed Abdul Ghanee, Mariyam Ashfa
