= Thiya Loaibaa Dhurah =

- Official film poster
- Directed by: Mariyam Moosa
- Written by: Mariyam Moosa
- Starring: Ahmed Azmeel; Maleeha Waheed
- Cinematography: Ali Rasheed
- Production company: Techno Media
- Release date: April 21, 2018
- Country: Maldives
- Language: Dhivehi

Thiya Loaibaa Dhurah is a 2018 Maldivian romantic film written and directed by Mariyam Moosa. Produced under Techno Media, the film stars Ahmed Azmeel and Maleeha Waheed in pivotal roles. The film was released on 21 April 2018. The entire film was shot in Sri Lanka.

== Cast ==
- Ahmed Azmeel as Amir
- Maleeha Waheed as Leen
- Ahmed Aman as Faiz
- Mariyam Shahuza as Shiu
- Sujeetha Abdulla
- Arifa Ibrahim

== Development ==
In early 2017, it was revealed that Mariyam Moosa was ready for her directorial debut with the film Thiya Loaibaa Dhurah. Moosa has previously penned stories for films; Majubooru Loabi, Qurubaanee and Sirru, where she worked as the assistant director for the latter. Shooting of the film was completed on 7 December 2017.

== Soundtrack ==
The soundtrack of the film incorporates two songs recorded by Ali Rameez, one for the album Ranfaunu, and one for the album Giritee, sixteen years back. "Dheewaana Mihira Vanee"—a solo version by Rameez and "Aavaa Handhaaney"—a duet with Fazeela Amir, was used in the film since a video for either tracks has not been released earlier. Theme song of the film, "Thiya Loaibaa Dhurah"—sung and composed by Ibrahim Nifar and penned by Ismail Mubaarik—was released on 11 March 2018.

No.	Title	Lyrics	Singer(s)	Length
1.	"Thiya Loaiybaa Dhurah"	Ismail Mubarik	Ibrahim Nifar
2.	"Dheewaanaa Mihira Vanee"	Boi Ahmed Khaleel	Ali Rameez
3.	"Aavaa Handhaaney"	Boi Ahmed Khaleel	Ali Rameez, Fazeela Amir
4.	"Abadhume Fahathun"	Boi Ahmed Khaleel	Ibrahim Amir, Fazeela Amir

== Release and response ==
Thiya Loaibaa Dhurah was released on 21 April 2018 and opened to a positive response at the box office. In May 2018, it was premiered in Sri Lanka, and played two housefull shows at Mount Lavinia Cinema.

The film received moderate response from critics. Aminath Lubaa from Sun praised the music and story of the film though she opined the performance from the actors could have been better.
