= Mariyam Shahuza =

Maldivian actress

Mariyam Shahuza is a Maldivian former film actress.

== Career ==
In 2002, Shahuza appeared in a small role as a doctor in Amjad Ibrahim-directed film Kahvalhah Dhaandhen (2002). Having disappeared from the screen for almost four years, she made a comeback as a gossip loving friend in the horror film Hukuru Vileyrey (2006), co-directed by Aishath Rishmy and Aminath Rasheedha which was based on a novel published by Ibrahim Waheed on Haveeru Daily in 2003. The film being a critical and commercial success was considered as "one of the best horror film the Maldivian Film Industry has ever produced". It was later aired as 15 episodes television series with inclusion of several scenes that were edited out in its theatrical release. This was followed by Amjad Ibrahim's romantic drama film Hithuge Edhun (2006) which narrates the story of a disabled man where she played a guest role of a teacher.

From the year 2006 to 2010, Shahuza mostly appeared in short films from Salhibe series and Vasvaas series to standalone short productions including Umurahves Inthizaaru Kuraanan (2007), The Boat (2008), Dhanthura (2008), Noonekey Nubunaashey (2008), Keehvehey Vakivee Yaaraa? (2010), and Lollypop (2010). During the time, she also starred in several television series including Vimlaa (2007), Hanaa (2008), Kushakaanulaa Shazaa Nudheyshey (2008) and Ssshhh... Miee Sirreh! (2009).

In 2011, she again collaborated with Amjad Ibrahim for his family drama Hithey Dheymee (2011) which received negative reviews from critics and was a box office disaster. A series of flop was continued with Hamid Ali's Laelaa starring Yoosuf Shafeeu, Amira Ismail, Ahmed Easa and Ali. The film revolves around two daughters who were forced to arranged marriages by their parent. The film received negative reviews from critics and was declared a box office failure. She again played a small role in her last release of the year; Yoosuf Shafeeu action drama film Insaaf (2011). The film revolves around the disputes between two districts of an island. Upon release, the film received mixed to positive reviews from critics.

This was followed by several other brief appearances in feature films including Aniyaa (2016), 4426 (2016), Vishka (2017) and Thiya Loaibaa Dhurah (2018). As for the television productions, she had major two releases during the period; Ahmed Saeed's mini-series Furaana Dheynan (2011) and Fathimath Nahula's romantic drama series Vakivumuge Kurin (2015).

== Filmography ==
=== Feature film ===
Year	Title	Role	Notes	Ref(s)
2002	Kahvalhah Dhaandhen	Doctor		
2006	Hukuru Vileyrey	Yusra		
2006	Hithuge Edhun	Idhan's teacher		
2009	Baaraige Fas	Aishath		
2011	Hithey Dheymee	Fazeena		
2011	Laelaa	Ahamma's wife		
2011	Insaaf	Sausan		
2014	Aniyaa	Areef's mistress		
2016	4426	Zeena's mother	Special appearance	
2017	Vishka	Zeenath	Special appearance	
2018	Thiya Loaibaa Dhurah	Shiu		

=== Short film ===
Year	Title	Role	Notes
2006	Salhibe	Jasmine	
2006	Vasvaas 2	Raihana	
2007	Vasvaas 3	Raihana	
2007	Loabeegaa Dhon U	Herself	Special appearance in the song "Come On My Darling"
2007	Umurahves Inthizaaru Kuraanan	Usha	
2007	Edhonveli Thundi 1	Shahu	
2007	Vasvaas 4	Raihana	
2007	Edhonveli Thundi 2	Shahu	
2008	Salhibe 2	Anoora	
2008	The Boat	Shiru	
2008	Dhanthura	Sarubathiyya	
2008	Noonekey Nubunaashey	Humey	
2010	Keehvehey Vakivee Yaaraa?	Zeyna	
2010	Lollypop	Haluvaa	
2011	Gudho Gudho	Shabnam	
2012	Island Thief	Amaanaa	
2012	Kidnap	Shahu	

=== Television ===
Year	Title	Role	Notes
2005–2006	Fukkashi	Various roles	Main role; 3 episodes
2007-2008	Vimlaa	Nathasha	Recurring role
2008	Hanaa		Main role
2008	Kushakaanulaa Shazaa Nudheyshey		Main role
2009	Ssshhh... Miee Sirreh!	Irasha	Recurring role
2009	Vakinuvaan Bunefaa Vaudheh Nuvanhey?	Shifaza	Main role; 13 episodes
2011	Furaana Dheynan	Fathun	Main role; 4 Episodes
2015	Vakivumuge Kurin	Zidhuna	Main role; 15 Episodes
2018	Shakuvaa Akaa Nulaa		Main role
2021	Buneladhee		Main role
