= Maleeha Waheed =

Maldivian film actress

Maleeha Waheed is a Maldivian film actress.

== Career ==
In 2016, Waheed made her film debut in Hussain Munawwar's Neyngi Yaaru Vakivee alongside Aminath Rishfa and Ahmed Azmeel. Critics gave the film bad reviews and considered her performance as Laila, to be "boring" while criticising the character development. Despite the negative reviews, the film did average business at the end of its run. At the 8th Gaumee Film Awards Waheed received a nomination for Best Female Debut award. Her next release of the year was Ali Seezan-directed romantic film Vafaatheri Kehiveriya. The film received a mixed to negative reception from critics. Similar sentiments being echoed as to her previous work, Nadheem severely criticised her "weak portrayal" of the character and "bad dialogue delivery". Yoosuf Shafeeu-directed Baiveriyaa (2016), a comedy film featuring an ensemble cast was her second release of the year. The film revolves around an aspiring actress who flees from her family to pursue a career in the film industry and the suspicions and confusions that arise. Upon release the film was positively received by critics. Nazim Hassan of Avas applauded the comical timing of the characters and mentioned that Waheed showed "improvements from her earlier work". The film emerged as one of the highest grossing Maldive films of the year.

In 2018, Waheed appeared in Mariyam Moosa's directorial debut romantic film Thiya Loaibaa Dhurah. The entire film was shot in Sri Lanka. It was moderately received by critics; Aminath Lubaa reviewing from Sun praised the music and story of the film though she opined the performance from the actors including Waheed, could have been better. In May 2018, it was premiered in Sri Lanka, and played two housefull shows at Mount Lavinia Cinema.

== Controversy ==
On 27 August 2019, Waheed was accused and charged of diamorphine trafficking. On 11 August 2022, Criminal Court finds the actress not guilty of the charge due to insufficient evidence to prove the charges beyond reasonable doubt.

== Filmography ==
=== Feature film ===
Year	Title	Role	Notes	Ref(s)
2016	Neyngi Yaaru Vakivee	Laila	Nominated—Gaumee Film Award for Best Female Debut	
2016	Vafaatheri Kehiveriya	Nuzu		
2016	Baiveriyaa	Iwrisha		
2018	Thiya Loaibaa Dhurah	Leen		
2019	Maamui	Thas	Special appearance	
2024	Bibii	Yashfa		

=== Television ===
Year	Title	Role	Notes	Ref(s)
2023	Badhalu	Reena	Main role; Episode: "Engaged"	
2023–2024	Yaaraa	Dhiyana "D"	Recurring role; 17 episodes	
2024	Dark Rain Chronicles	Shamha	Main role in the segment "Dhemaa"	
2025	Roaleemay	Raya	Recurring role; 4 episodes	

== Accolades ==
Year	Award	Category	Nominated work	Result	Ref(s)
2017	8th Gaumee Film Awards	Best Female Debut	Neyngi Yaaru Vakivee	Nominated	
