= Loabi Nulibunas =

Maldivian television drama series

- Genre: Drama
- Written by: Waleedha Waleed (Ep 1-4); Fathimath Nahula (Ep 5-15)
- Directed by: Waleedha Waleed
- Starring: Sheereen Abdul Wahid; Niuma Mohamed; Sheela Najeeb; Ali Seezan; Zeenath Abbas
- Music by: Hussain Sobah
- No. of seasons: 1
- No. of episodes: 15

Production
- Cinematography: Mohamed Abdul Gafoor; Abdulla Shameel; Hussain Imthiyaz
- Editors: Mohamed Jinah; Aswad Najeeb
- Running time: 20-29 minutes

Original release
- Release: 2004 – 2005

Loabi Nulibunas is a 2005 Maldivian television drama series developed for Television Maldives by Waleedha Waleed. The series stars Sheereen Abdul Wahid, Niuma Mohamed, Sheela Najeeb and Ali Seezan in pivotal roles.

== Cast ==
=== Main ===
- Sheereen Abdul Wahid as Usha
- Ali Seezan as Imran
- Niuma Mohamed as Fazna
- Sheela Najeeb as Dheena
- Zeenath Abbas as Shadhiya
- Ahmed Saeed as Saeed

=== Recurring ===
- Aminath Rasheedha as Khadheeja; Usha's step-mother
- Hassan Afeef as Ihusan
- Koyya Hassan Manik as Dheena's father
- Neena Saleem as Sofoora
- Ibrahim Jihad as Shuad
- Lufshan Shakeeb as Siraj
- Hiyala as Lalla
- Husnee Mohamed as Farooq
- Chilhiya Moosa Manik as Hussain Saeed

=== Guest ===
- Hawwa Ibrahim as Hawwa; Shadhiya's mother (Episode 1)
- Ibrahim Shaheem as Moosafulhu (Episode 1)
- Abdulla Munaz as a doctor (Episode 2)
- Abdul Sattar as Imran's father (Episode 2)
- Hameed as Postman (Episode 3)
- Mohamed Arif as Fahumee (Episode 4)
- Nadhira as Health Worker (Episode 5)

== Episodes ==
No. in season	Title	Directed by
1	"Episode 1"	Waleedha Waleed
Imran (Ali Seezan), visits his family friends for Eid, where he gets attracted to Usha (Sheereen Abdul Wahid), a young woman who lives a strenuous life with her aggressive vile step-mother, Khadheeja (Aminath Rasheedha). Usha also shares similar sentiments towards Imran, but feels too shy to confront her feelings due to the fear of her step-mother. Usha's best friend, Shadhiya (Zeenath Abbas) navigate being the third wheel in their relationship.
2	"Episode 2"	Waleedha Waleed
Despite all the pressures from Khadheeja, Usha firmly decides to put forward her love. Imran had to shorten his trip as his father (Saththaaru) gets admitted in the hospital. Their last meeting was abruptly stopped by Khadheeja who warns Imran and Usha about their relationship. On his deathbed, Imran's father requests him to marry his childhood friend, Fazna (Niuma Mohamed), much to his surprise. Imran confesses his love for Usha in front of Fazna and together they decide to tell the truth to Imran's father. However, fate was against them as he passes away before they could tell him the truth.
3	"Episode 3"	Waleedha Waleed
Unable to contact Usha, Imran sends a letter to her which Khadheeja gets hold of and fabricates it, saying that he is happily married to another woman. She further replaces Usha's reply, saying she intends to marry the man her mother approves. Imran finally finds out about Fazna's affection towards him and he proposes her.
4	"Episode 4"	Waleedha Waleed
Imran marries Fazna and together they relocate to a foreign country to complete Imran's studies. Usha finally agrees to marry Khadheeja's nephew, Shuad (Ibrahim Jihad), which turns out to be a scam plotted by Khadheeja to snatch his money. Two months later to their marriage, Usha is revealed to be pregnant to their first child.
5	"Episode 5"	Waleedha Waleed
Shuad starts having frequent fever and headaches, but he refuses to consult a doctor. Few years after Usha gives birth to their daughter, Shuad passes away. She later reads a letter instructing her to meet a man named Hussain Saeed (Chilhiya Moosa Manik), if she requires to inquire about his secrets and illness. Upon meeting him, Usha discovers that he was previously married to another woman and is cursed by her greedy family. Shadhiya starts an affair with Ihusan (Hassan Afeef) who is already married to a vile indolent woman, Sofoora (Neena Saleem).
6	"Episode 6"	Waleedha Waleed
After returning Male', Imran seems to be distressed over something. Desperate to find answers, Usha, alongside Shadhiya visits Saeed only to find him dead.
7	"Episode 7"	Waleedha Waleed
Imran meets Khdheeja and discovers that Usha is now a single-mother. Hussain Saeed’s death does not stop Usha from seeking for answers.
8	"Episode 8"	Waleedha Waleed
Usha meets Dheena (Sheela Najeeb), niece of Hussain Saeed who happens to be the ex-wife of Shuad. Fazna is shaken with the fear of losing her husband while Dheena spends sleepless nights remembering about Shuad and figuring out what leads to their separation. Usha crosses the path of Imran and reminisces their happy times together.
9	"Episode 9"	Waleedha Waleed
Dheena introduces Usha to her business partner turned best-friend, Fazna who happens to have a vague memory of Usha. Usha is revealed to be having a personal vendetta against Dheena and her ex-husband, Shuad. Imran is startled to see Usha as his personal assistant. Meanwhile, Shadhiya continues her affair with Ihusan.
10	"Episode 10"	Waleedha Waleed
Three years from the demise of Shuad, Dheena still spends sleepless nights reminiscing about him and hoping he will return one day. She becomes anguished when her father (Koyya Hassan Manik) reveals the fate of her ex-husband and the fact his passing was concealed from her. She further puts the blame of his death on her father.
11	"Episode 11"	Waleedha Waleed
Imran secretly starts dating Usha. While fainted on the road, Dheena is brought to a guest house located in Aa. Feridhoo by a stranger, Siraj Lufshan Shakeeb. Sofoora and Shadhiya catches Afeef red-handed entering Usha's room, who was mistaken as Shadhiya.
12	"Episode 12"	Waleedha Waleed
Shadhiya expels Usha and her daughter from her house who was ultimately taken care by Fazna. Ihusan reconcile with Shadhiya after narrating the wicked act of Sofoora. Dheena befriends with Siraj. Late night, Fazuna sees Imran in Usha's room where he is held in a difficult situation.
13	"Episode 13"	Waleedha Waleed
Fazna is devastated to learn her husband's infidelity. Imran is left with two options, choose either Usha or Fazna. The latter decides to sacrifice all her happiness for Imran.
14	"Episode 14"	Waleedha Waleed
In the middle of the argument, Fazna faints and is immediately taken to a hospital where she is revealed to be pregnant. This slowly causes Imran to drift away from Usha. Fazna's pregnancy creates a boundary wall for Usha in completing her mission.
15	"Episode 15"	Waleedha Waleed

== Soundtrack ==
Track listing
No.	Title	Lyrics	Music	Singer(s)	Length
1.	"Loabi Nulibunas"	Adam Naseer Ibrahim	Hussain Sobah	Shifa Thaufeeq
2.	"Loabeege Jaadhooeh Fadhain"	Adam Naseer Ibrahim	Hussain Sobah	Shifa Thaufeeq, Muaviyath Anwar
3.	"Veynaa Rihun Meygaa Vanee"	Adam Naseer Ibrahim	Hussain Sobah	Shifa Thaufeeq
4.	"Chaaloo Thuhthu Dhon"	Adam Haleem Adnan	Hussain Sobah	Shifa Thaufeeq
5.	"Loabi Dhen Gaimu Vevijjey"	Adam Naseer Ibrahim	Hussain Sobah	Hussain Sobah, Aishath Inaya
