= 14 February (TV series) =

- Genre: Horror drama
- Directed by: Ahmed Saeed
- Starring: Fathimath Azifa; Ahmed Asim; Ahmed Saeed; Abdulla Naseer; Aminath Shareef; Ahmed Shah
- No. of seasons: 1
- No. of episodes: 5

Production
- Running time: 23–25 minutes

Original release
- Network: Television Maldives
- Release: August 11, 2010 – 1 September 2010

14 February is a Maldivian romantic horror television series developed for Television Maldives by Ahmed Saeed. The series stars Fathimath Azifa, Ahmed Asim, Ahmed Saeed, Abdulla Naseer, Aminath Shareef and Ahmed Shah in pivotal roles. The series was aired on the occasion of 1431 Ramadan.

== Premise ==
Najuma (Aminath Shareef) and Khalid (Abdulla Naseer) discuss the mysterious murder of their daughter, Suma, who allegedly bled to death six years ago, on 14 February. Suma's twin sister, Shima (Fathimath Azifa) is romantically involved with a spirit in disguise of a human, Ayaan (Ahmed Saeed), a friend of Mahil (Ahmed Asim) who is attracted to Shima. Suspecting an illogical and inconsistent behavior from Ayaan, Mahil interrogates with Shima and explains that she is in love with a ghost. Meanwhile, Ayaan battles with Affal (Ahmed Shah) an evil spirit who murdered Suma.

== Cast and characters ==
- Fathimath Azifa as Shima / Suma
- Ahmed Asim as Mahil
- Ahmed Saeed as Ayaan
- Abdulla Naseer as Khalid
- Aminath Shareef as Najuma
- Ahmed Shah as Affal

== Soundtrack ==
Track listing
No.	Title	Singer(s)	Length
1.	"Mila Handhuvaruge Mathee"	Ibrahim Zaid Ali, Mariyam Ashfa
