= Vakivumuge Kurin =

- Genre: Romantic drama
- Written by: Fathimath Nahula; Fathimath Neena
- Screenplay by: Fathimath Nahula
- Directed by: Fathimath Nahula; Aishath Rishmy
- Starring: Mohamed Faisal; Aishath Rishmy; Sheela Najeeb; Aminath Rishfa; Ahmed Azmeel; Mariyam Shahuza; Ahmed Aman; Mariyam Azza; Aminath Rasheedha; Ibrahim Jihad
- No. of seasons: 1
- No. of episodes: 15

Production
- Producer: Crystal Entertainment
- Cinematography: Hassan Haleem
- Running time: 23–27 minutes

Original release
- Release: February 13, 2015

Vakivumuge Kurin is a Maldivian romantic drama television series developed for Television Maldives by Fathimath Nahula and Aishath Rishmy. The series stars Mohamed Faisal, Aishath Rishmy, Sheela Najeeb, Aminath Rishfa, Ahmed Azmeel, Mariyam Shahuza, Ahmed Aman, Mariyam Azza, Aminath Rasheedha and Ibrahim Jihad in pivotal roles. The first episode of the series was released on Television Maldives on 13 February 2015. A new episode of the series was telecast each Friday 2130.

== Premise ==
Shahid Shafeeq (Mohamed Faisal), happily married to Reenee (Aishath Rishmy) joins a political post at a government office. Reenee's younger sister, Raanee (Aminath Rishfa) an irresponsible young lady who lives with the couple, is almost raped by her gangster boyfriend, Shaheeb (Mohamed Rifshan). She breaks up with Shaheeb and starts a romantic relationship with Nihad (Ibrahim Jihad) whom she meets on Facebook who happens to be her school life friend. Meanwhile, Shahid struggles to deal with his seductive colleague, Maisha (Mariyam Azza) whom he dated previously. Married to Dr. Amir (Ahmed Aman), Maisha mistreats her mother, (Aminath Rasheedha) and calls her a burden.

Raanee takes a loan from her friend, Mary (Sujeetha Abdulla) and marries Nihad, covering all the expenses using that money. Her life turns upside down when police arrests Nihad while using drugs. Reenee is found to be pregnant meanwhile her infertile friend, Zidhna (Mariyam Shahuza) discovers her husband, Maaz (Ahmed Azmeel) to be having an extramarital affair with Rose (Sheela Najeeb). Reenee met an accident and slips on a coma. Shaheeb marries Raanee for the sake of his and Reenee's new born baby.

== Cast and characters ==
=== Main ===
- Mohamed Faisal as Shahid Shafeeq
- Aishath Rishmy as Reenee
- Sheela Najeeb as Rose
- Aminath Rishfa as Raanee
- Ahmed Azmeel as Maaz
- Mariyam Shahuza as Zidhna
- Ahmed Aman as Amir
- Mariyam Azza as Maisha
- Aminath Rasheedha as Maisha's mother
- Ibrahim Jihad as Nihad

=== Recurring ===
- Mohamed Rifshan as Shaheeb; Reenee's boyfriend
- Sujeetha Abdulla as Mary; Raanee's friend
- Ismail Aziel Azumeel as Zellu; Maisha's son

=== Guest ===
- Hassan Liam as Nihad's friend
- Yoosuf Eethan Rameez
- Abdulla Rasheed
- Jaufar Shafeeq
- Reema Hassan
- Ali Nihad
- Mohamed Waheed as Lawyer Saleem

== Soundtrack ==
Track listing
| No. | Title | Lyrics | Music | Singer(s) | Length |
|---|---|---|---|---|---|
| 1. | "Vakimuge Kurin" (Theme song) | Adam Haleem Adnan | Ibrahim Zaid Ali | Ibrahim Zaid Ali | 01:08 |
| Total length: | | | | | 01:08 |
