= Zaharu =

- Official film poster
- Directed by: Ali Shifau
- Written by: Ali Shifau
- Screenplay by: Ali Shifau
- Produced by: Mohamed Ali
- Starring: Ali Seezan; Niuma Mohamed; Sheela Najeeb
- Cinematography: Ali Shifau
- Edited by: Ali Shifau
- Music by: Ayyuman Shareef
- Production company: Dark Rain Entertainment
- Release date: May 5, 2011
- Country: Maldives
- Language: Dhivehi

Zaharu (transl. Poison) is a 2011 Maldivian psychological romantic thriller film written and directed by Ali Shifau. Produced by Mohamed Ali under Dark Rain Entertainment, the film stars Ali Seezan, Niuma Mohamed and Sheela Najeeb in pivotal roles. The film is inspired from Adrian Lyne-directed American psychological erotic thriller film Fatal Attraction (1987). The film centers on a married man who has a weekend affair with a woman who refuses to allow it to end and becomes obsessed with him. The film was released on 5 May 2011. Upon release the film received mixed response from critics and was declared a "flop" at box office.

== Plot ==
Hussain (Ali Seezan) is a successful, happily married interior designer whose work leads him to meet Shaheen (Sheela Najeeb), a long lost friend. While his wife, Aminath (Niuma Mohamed), and daughter, Shumakko (Fathmath Aflaz Faisal), are out of Male' for the weekend, Hussain has an affair with Shaheen. Though it was initially understood by both as just a fling, Shaheen starts clinging to him.

Hussain spends a second unplanned evening with Shaheen after she persistently asks him over. When Dan tries to leave, she starts crying, he consoles her and leaves. He thinks the affair is forgotten, but she shows up at various places to see him. She comes to his office one day to apologize. She then continues to call him until he tells his secretary that he will no longer take her calls. One day she waits at his office, claiming that she is pregnant and plans to keep the baby. When Hussain opines to abort the baby, she cuts her wrists. He helps her bandage the cuts and then leaves. Hussain's colleague Adhil (Mohamed Faisal) breaks into Shaheen's apartment and discovered her lies about pregnancy. He also find a report which states Shaheen has been sentence to a mental asylum of Malaysia and she has been accused of killing her husband.

She helps Aminath to catch a thief who stole her handbag and befriends with Aminath. The next day, Shaheen sends some photographs of Hussain and Shaheen taken that night, to his apartment. Shaheen then phones his home at all hours, claiming that she misses him. On Shumakko's dismissal time, Shaheen picks her up at schools and spends an evening hanging out. Anxious about her well-being, they informs police, while Shumakko returned home that night. Hussain immediately goes to Shaheen's apartment and confronted her.

Hussain took a vacation with his family, but this does not deter Shaheen. When they are not at home, Shaheen breaks into Hussain's apartment, ripped off Shumakko's doll and applies wire in the water which gives Aminath an electric shock. After this, Hussain tells Aminath of the affair. Enraged, she leaves Hussain and moves to Adhil's house. After being counselled by her father, Aminath moves back to Hussain's house. Hussain took a leave from work and moves to K. Thulusdhoo with his family. Worried about his whereabouts, Shaheen meets Liusha (Nashidha Mohamed), wife of Adhil, at a shop, hides her purse and befriend with her by paying for the groceries. From her, Shaheen finds about his whereabouts and goes to Thulusdhoo.

Realizing Shaheen's intention, Adhil calls Hussain, but his phone was switched off and is out for a coffee with a friend. Shaheen barges into Aminath's apartment and attacks her, choking her and coming close to strangling her. Aminath breaks a glass vase over Shaheen's head and stops her for a while. After a moment of chasing they engaged in a scuffle only to be stabbed with the broken vase. Hussain comes and overpowers Shaheen. The final scene shows Shaheen at a mental asylum.

== Cast ==
- Ali Seezan as Hussain
- Niuma Mohamed as Aminath
- Sheela Najeeb as Shaheen
- Fathmath Aflaz Faisal as Shumakko
- Nashidha Mohamed as Liusha
- Mohamed Faisal as Adhil
- Abdulla Hussain as Abusy
- Ahmed Saeed as Issey (special appearance)
- Mohamed Manik as Zareer (special appearance)
- Roanu Hassan Manik as Aminth's father (special appearance)

== Soundtrack ==
Track listing
No.	Title	Lyrics	Music	Singer(s)	Length
1.	"Lah la la laa"	Ismail Mubarak	Ayyuman Shareef	Shifa Thaufeeq, Hassan Ilham, Aminath Sidhana
2.	"Araamudheyshey"	Mohamed Abdul Ghanee	Ibrahim Zaid Ali	Ibrahim Zaid Ali, Rafiyath Rameeza
3.	"Sindhitha"	Mukhthar Fahmy	Mohamed Fuadh	Ahmed Tholal
4.	"Moosumey Mee"	Mohamed Zaheen	Ayyuman Shareef	Shifa Thaufeeq, Umar Zahir
5.	"Zaharu"	Mohamed Abdul Ghanee	Ibrahim Zaid Ali	Ibrahim Zaid Ali
6.	"Baakee"	Mohamed Abdul Ghanee	Ibrahim Zaid Ali	Ibrahim Zaid Ali, Rafiyath Rameeza

== Accolades ==
Award	Category	Recipients	Result	Ref.
2nd Maldives Film Awards	Best Supporting Actress	Sheela Najeeb	Nominated	
7th Gaumee Film Awards	Best Supporting Actress	Sheela Najeeb	Nominated	
