= Hama Ekani Kalaayahtakai =

Maldivian television series

- Opening sequence
- Directed by: Mohamed Manik
- Country of origin: Maldives
- Original language: Divehi
- No. of seasons: 1
- No. of episodes: 5

Original release
- Release: September 10 – October 7, 2008

Hama Ekani Kalaayahtakai is a Maldivian romantic fantasy drama television series directed by Mohamed Manik. It stars Manik, Mariyam Azza, Sheela Najeeb and Aminath Rasheedha in main roles. The series follows the life of a cursed man who turns into a beast each full moon night and his journey to reformation with deceit and sacrifice.

== Cast ==
- Mohamed Manik as Hassan Naail
- Mariyam Azza as Nadhuwa
- Sheela Najeeb as Shiyana
- Aminath Rasheedha as Naail's mother

== Episodes ==
No.	Title	Directed by	Original release date
1	"Episode 1"	Mohamed Manik	September 10, 2008
Hassan Naail (Mohamed Manik) a wise and religious old aged man spends most of his time praying and worshiping God. Concerned citizens request him to share a part of his past, which he rebuffs fearing it would change their perception towards him. However, to ease his pain, he shares his past to a fellow young man. During his childhood, his father, Thakurufaanu, a sorcerer, died of an unknown illness. In his prime youth, he meets Nadhuwa (Mariyam Azza) who visits his island for a health inspection. Nadhuwa and Hassan keep meeting frequently and a relationship grows between them.
2	"Episode 2"	Mohamed Manik	September 17, 2008
Nadhuwa and her team is informed of a supernatural horror event that recurs every full moon days of the month at the eastern side of the island, the exact location where Nadhuwa meets Naail. The following day, he invites her to his home, and gets stuck at his place due to an incoming storm. Naail's mother (Aminath Rasheedha) expresses her extreme discomfort over her stay.
3	"Episode 3"	Mohamed Manik	September 24, 2008
Nadhuwa is kept in a separate room who wakes up to the sound of a beast growling. She moves out of her room only to find Naail chained to a pole as a semi-beast. Naail's mother reveals that he is possessed by a disobedient jinn bewitched by his father who took control of his body after his father's demise. Nadhuwa offers to help him reform completely to a human which Naail's mother refuses realizing its cost. Nadhuwa promises to keep his secret safe.
4	"Episode 4"	Mohamed Manik	October 1, 2008
Nadhuwa insists on staying at the island to be with Naail, which her colleague, Shiyana (Sheela Najeeb) disapproves. Unable to sleep, Nadhuwa pays a visit to Naail one last night. The following morning, he wakes up and decides to go to Nadhuwa's house, much to his mother's surprise, who reveals that Nadhuwa is no more.
5	"Episode 5"	Mohamed Manik	October 7, 2008
Unable to convince him, his mother shows the corpse of Nadhuwa whose body was as pale as a white sheet. Realizing that Naail's curse will uplift only when he murders his first true love, Naail's mother sacrifices Nadhuwa. The guilt fills him and wish to spend the rest of his live as a slave of the God.

== Soundtrack ==
Track listing
No.	Title	Singer(s)	Length
1.	"Hama Ekani Kalaayahtakai"	Ibrahim Zaid Ali

== Release and reception ==
The series was aired on 10 September 2008 on the occasion of 1429 Ramadan. The series mainly received mixed reviews from critics, where its uncanny similarities with Beauty and the Beast were particularly noted. The connectivity between the scenes were further criticized for its frequent change in character names between two scenes.
