= Baiveriyaa =

- Official film poster
- Directed by: Yoosuf Shafeeu
- Screenplay by: Yoosuf Shafeeu
- Produced by: Niuma Mohamed; Ismail Shafeeq
- Starring: Yoosuf Shafeeu; Sheela Najeeb; Ahmed Azmeel; Maleeha Waheed; Ahmed Saeed
- Cinematography: Shivaz Abdulla
- Edited by: Yoosuf Shafeeu
- Music by: Mohamed Ikram
- Production company: Envision Entertainment
- Release date: December 14, 2016
- Country: Maldives
- Language: Dhivehi

Baiveriyaa is a 2016 Maldivian comedy film written and directed by Yoosuf Shafeeu. Produced by Niuma Mohamed and Ismail Shafeeq under Envision Entertainment, the film stars Yoosuf Shafeeu, Sheela Najeeb, Ahmed Azmeel, Maleeha Waheed and Ahmed Saeed in pivotal roles. The film was released on 14 December 2016. The film revolves around an aspiring actress who flees from her family to pursue a career in the film industry and the suspicions and confusions that arise.

== Cast ==
- Yoosuf Shafeeu as Werash
- Sheela Najeeb as Riyasha
- Ahmed Azmeel as Yanish
- Maleeha Waheed as Iwrisha
- Ahmed Saeed as Janu
- Nashidha Mohamed as Noora
- Ahmed Sunie as Wafir
- Mohamed Faisal as Bassam
- Hussain Shibau as Nasir
- Ahmed Rifau
- Maisha Ahmed
- Hussain Shadyaan Hassan
- Fathimath Azifa

== Release ==
Producer Ismail Shafeeq conceptualised the film in 2013 and shared it with Yoosuf Shafeeu who wrote the screenplay, then directed, starred in, and edited the film. The film was announced on 6 June 2016. The film was released on 14 December 2016. Upon release the film was positively received by critics. Nazim Hassan of Avas applauded the comical timing of the characters and picked the arguments between Shafeeu and Najeeb as the highlight of the film. Hassan was dissatisfied with the length of the film though he praised the "twist at the end" of the film.
