= Imthihaan (web series) =

Maldivian web series

- Written by: Mariyam Moosa
- Screenplay by: Mariyam Moosa
- Directed by: Abdulla Muaz
- Starring: Ahmed Azmeel; Mariyam Shifa; Mohamed Ishfan; Shaheedha Ahmed; Aishath Laisha Latheef
- Country of origin: Maldives
- Original language: Divehi
- No. of seasons: 1
- No. of episodes: 10

Production
- Producer: Fathimath Fareela
- Cinematography: Shivaz Abdulla
- Running time: 23-35 minutes
- Production companies: 24 Entertainment; Abdulla Muaz Productions

Original release
- Release: April 10 – June 5, 2025

Imthihaan is a Maldivian romantic drama web series directed by Abdulla Muaz. It stars Ahmed Azmeel, Mariyam Shifa, Mohamed Ishfan, Aishath Laisha Latheef and Shaheedha Ahmed in main roles. The pilot episode was released on 10 April 2025. Filming took place in R. Maakurathu.

== Premise ==
Afa's world is shaken when her ex-husband Mirufaan returns after three years-just as their daughter Ansha falls critically ill. Caught between old wounds and a new life with Shiyaan, Afa must face the family that once abandoned her. But as Ansha's condition worsens, a painful truth emerges.

== Cast and characters ==
=== Main ===
- Ahmed Azmeel as Mirufaan
- Mariyam Shifa as Afa
- Mohamed Ishfan as Shiyaan
- Aishath Laisha Latheef as Inaya
- Shaheedha Ahmed as Athoo
- Abdulla Mahir as Areef
- Ziyana Ahmed Rasheed as Ansha

=== Recurring ===
- Ahmed Rasheed as Ali
- Maajid as Maajid
- Aishath Mahmood as Areefa
- Shaheema Hussein as Sofiyya
- Ali Shareef as Faheem
- Washiya Mohamed
- Shaufa Adam

== Episodes ==
No.	Title	Directed by	Original release date
1	"The Return"	Abdulla Muaz	April 10, 2025
After three years apart, former lovers Afa and Mirufaan reunite on their island home. Unspoken feelings linger as they navigate tense conversations about their daughter, Ansha. Neither knows why their perfect love ended nor dares to ask.
2	"Boundaries"	Abdulla Muaz	April 10, 2025
Mirufaan's colleague, Inaya, is interested in him and wishes to marry him, but her mother strongly disapproves, as he was previously married and has a child. Mirufaan enters Ansha’s room, Afa’s warning echoing in his mind. Flashbacks of a lost love flicker as Ansha stirs in her sleep.
3	"The Truth Hurts"	Abdulla Muaz	April 17, 2025
Areefa continues to express her disdain toward Afa, masking the hidden affection she still holds deep within. Meanwhile, Mirufaan confronts Afa about abandoning him, but she coldly urges him to move on. Just then, Afa’s fiancé, Shiyan, arrives and opens the door—only to freeze in stunned silence at the tense scene before him.
4	"The Clash"	Abdulla Muaz	April 24, 2025
As the battle rages, flashback reveal the deep-rooted conflict between them-betrayals, broken alliances, and a fateful incident that turned them from allies into sworn enemies.
5	"Rising Flames"	Abdulla Muaz	May 1, 2025
The aftermath of the brutal battles leaves Shiyan wounded but determined. As tensions escalate, he struggles to keep his family and allies united, knowing that Mirufaan's victory has emboldened their enemies. Meanwhile, Mirufaan and Afa-now a fearsome duo-grow stronger, their dark ambitions becoming clearer
6	"Breaking Point"	Abdulla Muaz	May 8, 2025
Three shattered relationships hanging by a thread as the embrace lingers ending years of silence. The ice between them begins to crack.
7	"Fragile Hearts"	Abdulla Muaz	May 15, 2025
Mirufaan breaks down upon seeing Ansha hospitalized. Tensions rise as past and present collide at her bedside. As Ansha's condition worsens, Afa's true affection and dependence are revealed, further straining her relationships.
8	"Secrets Exposed"	Abdulla Muaz	May 22, 2025
Tensions explodes as Mirufaan steps closer to Afa, their unresolved chemistry burning bright. Betrayal flashes in his eyes as the truth unravels, leaving all three caught in a storm of anger, longing and broken trust.
9	"Healing Wounds"	Abdulla Muaz	May 29, 2025
Afa's long-lost father returns, sparking a flood of emotion as her broken family begins to heal. Caught between reunion and lost love, Afa must decide if she can truly have both.
10	"The Way Back to Us"	Abdulla Muaz	June 5, 2025
After seasons of heartbreak and struggles, Afa and Mirufaan embrace family approved but at a huge cost.

== Soundtrack ==
Track listing
No.	Title	Singer(s)	Length
1.	"Imthihaan"	Mariyam Ashfa, Ali Inaan Saeedh

== Release and reception ==
The first episode of the series was released on 10 April 2025. Upon release, the film received mixed reviews from critics, with the acting and narration garnering polarized responses.
