= Ahmed Saeed (actor) =

Maldivian actor and director

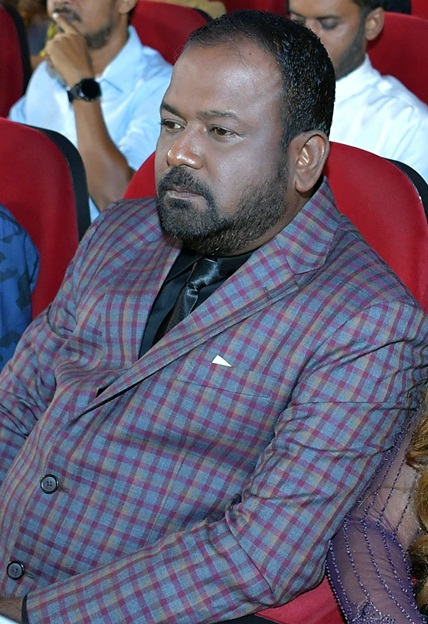
- Saeed at 9th Gaumee Film Awards ceremony, 2019
- Occupations: Actor, director
- Years active: 1997–present
- Spouse: Fathimath Azifa (m. 2016)
- Children: 4

Ahmed Saeed is a Maldivian film actor and director.

== Career ==
=== 1997–2010: Debut and early releases ===
On 13 June 1997, Saeed made his screen debut in a video single alongside Hassan Afeef and Mariyam Nisha. Afterwards, he played a role in Yoosuf Rafeeu's Dhiriulhumakee Mieebaa?. He made his official film debut in Fathimath Nahula's debut direction Fahuneyvaa (1998), starring opposite Hussain Sobah, Jamsheedha Ahmed and Mariyam Nisha which portrays the love-conflict of a man between a prominent stage performer and a deaf-mute poor girl. Saeed played the role of Ahmed, a childhood friend of Ziyan who secretly marries two girls. The film was critically appreciated by critics and was a Hit commercially by screening twenty six housefull shows at cinema.

Amjad Ibrahim-directed Ainbehge Loabi Firiehge Vaajib, starring Saeed, Yoosuf Shafeeu, Jamsheedha Ahmed, Arifa Ibrahim and Niuma Mohamed was released in 2000. The film revolves around a woman who has been mistreated by her step-mother and forced into a marriage she disapproves. Saeed played the fiancé of Vileena who is an indolent daughter ill-treating her own mother.

The following year, he collaborated with Fathimath Nahula for her romantic film Kalaayaanulaa (2003), which follows a happily married couple (played by Yoosuf Shafeeu and Aishath Shiranee) where the husband decided to marry his childhood best friend (played by Niuma Mohamed) when his wife fails to sexually please him. The film received widespread critical acclaim for its performances and was declared to be year's highest grossing Maldivian film release. It was followed by Abdul Faththaah-directed Aan... Aharenves Loabivin (2002) starred alongside Ali Seezan, Sheela Najeeb, Niuma Mohamed, Aminath Rasheedha and Neena Saleem where he played the role of a determined man. Upon release, the film opened to positive response from critics and was a commercially successful project. He was applauded for his performance as the money-greedy cunning man, in the Abdul Faththaah-directed critically acclaimed television series, Thiyey Mihithuge Vindhakee (2003) which was considered as one of the best series production in television industry.

He next appeared in a brief role as colleague of a mystified man who has been detested by his crush in Abdul Faththaah's critically praised romantic film Vehey Vaarey Therein (2003). Featuring Yoosuf Shafeeu, Jamsheedha Ahmed, Khadheeja Ibrahim Didi, Mohamed Shavin, Amira Ismail and Aminath Rasheedha in crucial roles, the film narrates the story of unrequited love, and proved to be one of the highest-grossing Maldivian films of the year. She then stepped into Fathimath Nahula's critically and commercially successful romantic drama television series, Kalaage Haqqugaa to portray the role of Zubair, an obliging friend.

Saeed appeared as a man possessed by evil spirit in Hukuru Vileyrey (2006), co-directed by Aishath Rishmy and Aminath Rasheedha which was based on a novel published by Ibrahim Waheed on Haveeru Daily in 2003. The film was a critical and commercial success while being considered as "one of the few acceptable horror film the Maldivian Film Industry has ever produced". It was later released as 15 episodes television series with inclusion of several clips that were edited off while released in theatre.

In 2008, Saeed appeared in a small role in Fathimath Nahula's romantic drama film, Yoosuf which depicts the story of a deaf and mute man (played by Yoosuf Shafeeu) who has been mistreated by a wealthy family, mocking his disability. Featuring an ensemble cast including Yoosuf Shafeeu, Niuma Mohamed, Sheela Najeeb, Ahmed Nimal, Fauziyya Hassan, Mohamed Manik, Ravee Farooq, Zeenath Abbas and Ahmed Lais Asim, the film received widespread critical acclaim and was attained a blockbuster status at box office.

In 2009, Saeed appeared in Ali Shifau's suspense thriller Happy Birthday which narrates the story of a simple man who receives a call on his birthday informing that his wife and son have been kidnapped, only to be returned for a ransom. Saeed played the role of Hussain, a friend of a straightforward man who had an unfortunate birthday. A total of five shows with little occupancy were screened at the cinema, declaring the film a commercial failure, despite the positive response from the critics. Winning five Gaumee Film Awards and twelve Maldives Film Awards, the film was also screened at the Venice Film Festival.

In 2010, Saeed appeared in a small role in Veeraana as a government official who witness the confess of a murderer. Directed by Yoosuf Shafeeu, it deals with child sexual abuse. The film received mixed to positive reviews from critics; praising the writer and director for touching a condemnatory topic though criticizing its "over-the-top melodrama". Having a strong buzz prior its release, the film was proved to be a commercial success. The same year he directed and starred in the 4 episodes horror television drama series 14 February.

=== 2011–17: Critical appreciation with supporting roles ===
In 2011 Saeed played the role of Junaid, the selfish friend of Nashid—played by Ismail Rasheed—who brainwashed him to be involved in counterfeit dollars business, in Moomin Fuad-directed crime tragedy drama Loodhifa. Featuring an ensemble cast, the film deals with current social issues in the society told from different perspectives of the characters. Made on a budget of MVR 600,000, the film was declared a commercial failure though it received wide critical acclaim and several accolades. At the 7th Gaumee Film Awards, Saeed was bestowed with the Best Costume Design award for his work in the film. He then featured in a small role in Ali Shifau's psychological romantic thriller Zaharu alongside Ali Seezan, Niuma Mohamed and Sheela Najeeb. The film centers on a married man who has a weekend affair with a woman who refuses to allow it to end and becomes obsessed with him. The film is inspired from Adrian Lyne-directed American psychological erotic thriller film Fatal Attraction (1987). Upon release the film received mixed response from critics and was declared a "flop" at box office. Last release of the year featured Saeed as a police officer Zareer in Yoosuf Shafeeu-directed action drama film Insaaf (2011). The film revolves around the disputes between two districts of an island. Upon release, the film received mixed to positive reviews from critics. Ahmed Nadheem from Haveeru praised the performance of Saeed. For his performance, he received a nomination as Best Actor at 7th Gaumee Film Awards and 2nd Maldives Film Awards.

Saeed's only release of 2012 was Abdul Fattah's romantic film Love Story (2012) alongside Ali Seezan, Aishath Rishmy and Amira Ismail. Displeased with the screenplay and performance of the actors, Nadheem of Haveeru wrote: "None of the actors were given scope to build their characters and none was able to justify their character. With excessive emotional scenes, actors were exposed to over-acting and nothing more". In 2013, Saeed featured in Ali Shifau-directed horror film Fathis Handhuvaruge Feshun 3D which serves as a prequel to Fathis Handhuvaru (1997) starring Reeko Moosa Manik and Niuma Mohamed in lead roles. It was based on a story by Ibrahim Waheed, Jinaa: Fathis Handhuvaruge Feshun (2009), which itself is a prequel to the story Fathishandhuvaru (1996) written by himself which was later adapted to a film by same name in 1997. The film was marketed as being the first 3D release for a Maldivian film and the first release derived from spin-off. Upon release the film received generally negative reviews from critics. Ahmed Nadheem from Haveeru Daily called the film a "disappointment" and Saeed's performance a "forgettable" one.

In 2014, he starred opposite Ali Seezan and Aishath Rishmy in Seezan's directorial venture, psychological thriller Insaana. It revolves around a murder and how the murderer tries to evade from the crime. Made on a budget of MVR 220,000, the film was inspired by Ryan Connolly's short psychological horror film Tell (2012) which is loosely based on the Edgar Allan Poe short story "The Tell-Tale Heart". Upon release, the film received widespread critical acclaim. Hassan Naail from Vaguthu called it "one of the best Maldivian release till date" and was satisfied with the performance of whole cast. At the 2015 South Asian Association for Regional Cooperation Film Festival, Insaana was bestowed with Bronze Medal as Best Film, competing with seventeen regional films. He next appeared in the Aishath Fuad Thaufeeq-directed Hulhudhaan alongside Mariyam Majudha and Roanu Hassan Manik which was a critical success. The film was later screened at the Venice Film Festival. The following year, Saeed appeared in Ali Seezan's action film Ahsham. Though the film received mixed reviews from critics, Saeed's performance as Jawid, an underboss was widely acclaimed. It was one of the three entries from the Maldives to the SAARC Film Festival in 2016. At the 8th Gaumee Film Awards Saeed received the Gaumee Best Supporting Actor award for Ahsham.

Saeed again collaborated with Seezan to star in his romantic film Vafaatheri Kehiveriya (2016). The film received a mixed to negative reception from critics. Nadheem blamed the title of the film for giving the impression of "old typical" to the film and considered Saeed's acting to be "strictly average" when compared to his other films. Yoosuf Shafeeu-directed Baiveriyaa (2016), a comedy film featuring an ensemble cast was his second release of the year. The film revolves around an aspiring actress who flees from her family to pursue a career in the industry and the suspicions and confusions that arise. Upon release the film was positively received by critics. Nazim Hassan of Avas applauded the comic timing of the characters and mentioned Saeed's comic sense as a "highlight of the movie" including the scenes in which he depicts different notable film characters. The film emerged as one of the highest grossing Maldivian films of the year.

In 2017, Farooq portrayed MP Manik, a corrupt politician lured into a trap laid by Vishka, played by Aishath Rishmy, in Ravee Farooq's crime thriller Vishka. Prior to release it faced controversies as Hassan Haleel requested a deferred release claiming he allegedly owns the story and script of the film. However, the film was cleared for exhibition with the court order proclaiming that the ownership of the script and story belongs to Rishmy. Upon release, the film opened to a positive response from critics. Mohamed Musthafa of the Sun applauded its "unexpected climax" and Saeed's "exceptional portrayal" of the corrupt politician. Echoing similar sentiments, Ahmed Nadheem of Avas considered his acting to be "per excellence, and beyond Maldivian cinematic standards". The film was screened at the SAARC Film Festival in 2017. He next featured alongside an ensemble cast including Yoosuf Shafeeu, Mohamed Manik, Fathimath Azifa and Ali Seezan in the romantic comedy film Naughty 40 which was directed by Shafeeu. The film revolves around three friends, Ashwanee, Ahsan and Ajwad (Played by Shafeeu, Saeed and Manik respectively) who are single and having a youthful outlook, in spite of being in their forties. Azifa played the role of Taniya, the beguiling lady signed up by her aunt to seduce and take down their rival businessman in the island, Jawad. The film met with both critical and commercial success, emerging as one of the highest grossing Maldivian films of 2017.

=== 2018–present: Experiment with different genres ===
2018 was a dull year for Maldivian film-industry with regards to 2018 Maldivian presidential election, hence only one film of Faisal was released during the year; a suspense thriller film Dhevansoora (2018) written and directed by Yoosuf Shafeeu. The film marks Shafeeu's thirtieth direction and features an ensemble cast of twenty-one actors. Revolving around a murder investigating, Saeed played a police officer and the station head trying to solve the murder mystery. The film received positive reviews from critics and was considered a "norm-breaker" for the Maldivian cinema. Ahmed Hameed Adam reviewing from VNews wrote: "Though Saeed had a small role in terms of screen time, he leaves an impact with the performance".

Saeed's first release of 2019 was the Moomin Fuad-directed psychological horror thriller Nivairoalhi (2019) which marks Niuma Mohamed's last onscreen film. Revolving around a patient suffering from depression, he played a small role in the film. Starring opposite Mohamed, Yoosuf Shafeeu and Ahmed Asim, the film received majorly positive reviews from critics; Aishath Maaha of Dho? favored the performance of the lead actors and mentioned the "neat arrangement" of its screenplay though pointed out its "weak ending" to be unsatisfactory while his performance was noted to be a "one-scene impression". He reprised the role Ahsan in the horror comedy film 40+ (2019), a sequel to 2017 released comedy film Naughty 40, which was well received both critically and commercially.

== Media image ==
In 2018, he was ranked in the fifth position from Dho?'s list of Top Ten Actor of Maldives.

== Personal life ==
On 2 September 2016, Saeed married one of his co-stars, Fathimath Azifa. On 18 May 2019, Azifa gave birth to a daughter.

== Filmography ==
=== Feature film ===
Year	Title	Role	Notes	Ref(s)
1998	Fahuneyvaa	Ahmed		
2000	Ainbehge Loabi Firiehge Vaajib	Vileena's fiancé		
2002	Aan... Aharenves Loabivin	Ammadey		
2003	Kalaayaanulaa	Niyaa		
2003	Vehey Vaarey Therein	Nafil		
2004	Sandhuravirey 2	Matheenu		
2006	Hukuru Vileyrey	Rasheed		
2008	Yoosuf	Aslam's friend		
2009	Happy Birthday	Hussain		
2010	Veeraana	Government officer	Special appearance	
2010	Fanaa	Fahud	Special appearance	
2011	Loodhifa	Junaid		
2011	Zaharu	Issey	Special appearance	
2011	Insaaf	Zareer	Nominated—Gaumee Film Award for Best Actor; Nominated—Maldives Film Award for Best Actor	
2012	Love Story	Iqbal		
2013	Fathis Handhuvaruge Feshun 3D	Shareef		
2014	Insaana	Ibbe		
2014	Hulhudhaan	Rashad		
2015	Ahsham	Jawid	Gaumee Film Award for Best Supporting Actor	
2016	Vafaatheri Kehiveriya	Iburey		
2016	Baiveriyaa	Janu		
2017	Vishka	Manik	Nominated—Gaumee Film Award for Best Supporting Actor	
2017	Naughty 40	Ahsan		
2017	Neydhen Vakivaakah	Imthiyaz		
2018	Dhevansoora	Riyaz		
2019	Nivairoalhi	Anwar		
2019	Goh Raalhu	Husham's uncle		
2019	40+	Ahsan		
2019	Nafrathuvumun	Zameer	Special appearance	
2019	Maamui	Dirty Boy		
2019	Leena	Satthar		
2020	Andhirikan	Hashim		
2021	Maryam	Adhunan Haleem		
2023	Jokaru	Kadheeru		
2024	Fureytha	Solih		
2024	Bibii	Abdu Salaam		
2025	Ilzaam	Manik		
2026	Gilan	Hameed		
2026	Magey Bituge Wedding	Saeed		
2026	Dhevi	Satthar		
2026	Majunoon			

=== Television ===
Year	Title	Role	Notes	Ref(s)
1997	Dhiriulhumakee Mieebaa?			
1999	Aisha	Jina's brother		
1999–2000	Maafkuraashey	Saeed	Main role; 10 episodes	
2000	Reysham	Nasih's friend	Guest role; "Episode 4"	
2000	Dharifulhu	Representative	Television film Special appearance	
2001	Konme Fiyavalhehves	Asif		
2003	Ujaalaa Raasthaa	Afsal	Main role; 8 episodes	
2003	Hiyy Edhey Raasthaa			
2003	Vaisoori	Hameed / doctor	In the segments "Azum" and "Loaiybaa Eku"	
2003–2005	Thiyey Mihithuge Vindhakee	Shareef	Main role; 33 episodes	
2004	Dhiriulhumakee Mieebaa?	Susy's boyfriend	Episode: "Seytu"	
2004–2005	Loabi Nulibunas	Saeed	Recurring role; 8 episodes	
2005	Loabi Vaanama	Yasir	Main role; 13 episodes	
2005–2006	Fukkashi	Various roles	Main role; 8 episodes	
2005	Kalaage Haqqugaa	Zubair	Main role	
2006	Kuramey Vadhaaee Salaam	Ramiz	Main role; 13 episodes	
2006	Huri Gothakee Miee!	Saeedh	Episode: "Chillspa"	
2006	Nethi Dhiyayas	Hampe	Main role; 5 episodes	
2006–2008	Hinithun Velaashey Kalaa	Ibrahim Muraadh	Main role; 21 episodes	
2007	Dhiriulhumakee Mieebaa?	Abdul Ghanee	Episode: "Bithufangi Noos"	
2008	FB!		Main role; 5 episodes Also the director	
2008	Loabi Nuviyas Firumaaladhee			
2009	Ssshhh... Miee Sirreh!	Vildhan		
2009	Huri Gothakee Mieebaa?	Maajidh	Episode: "Member"	
2009	Silsilaa	Wajeeh	Recurring role; 5 episodes	
2010	14 February	Ayaan	Also the director	
2010	Diary	Azim		
2011	Naamaan	Isse		
2013	Vaudhey Mee	Qasim	Main role; 9 episodes	
2016	Bithufangi 2			
2019	Ehenas	Rayan's counselor	Voice-over; Guest role	
2020	Gamini	Ageel	Recurring role; 4 episodes	
2020–2021	Huvaa Kohfa Bunan	Jamsheed "Jaanu"	Main role	
2021	Rumi á Jannat	Haadhy	Main role; 11 episodes	
2021	Nafsu	Faiz	Main role; 10 episodes	
2021–2022	Giritee Loabi	Faiz	Recurring role; 22 episodes	
2022	Vihaali	Hanim	Guest role in the segment "Lift Golhi"	
2022	Biruveri Vaahaka	Zahir	Main role; 6 episodes	
2022–2024	Dark Rain Chronicles	Azee / Razzag	Main role in the segments "Surprise" and "Baiskalu"	
2023	Mirai	Dhanish	Guest role; Episode: "Faara"	
2024	Yaaraa	Rafkhan's brother	Guest role; "Episode 50"	
2025	Hinthaa	Haleem	Recurring role; 2 episodes	
2025	Moosun	Rizwan	Main role; 5 episodes	
2025	Chaalaakee			

=== Short film ===
Year	Title	Role	Notes	Ref(s)
2006	Kudafoolhuge Vasvaas	Sultan	Also the director	
2007	Neena	Hussain		
2007	Jinneenge Dharubaaru	Righteous devil		
2007	Umurahvess Inthizaaru Kuraanan	Reshma's fiancé		
2007	Kudafoolhaai Paree Dhahtha	Sultan		
2007	Kuri Inthizaaruge Nimun	Muhusin		
2009	Burraas Jinni		Also the director	
2009	Lhakoe	Story-teller		
2020	KKB: Kuda Kuda Baaru	Ziyad		
2021	Gulhun	Himself	Special appearance	
2024	Aimi	Labeeb		

=== Other work ===
Year	Title	Director	Screenplay	Notes	Ref(s)
2006	Kudafoolhuge Vasvaas	Yes		Short film	
2008	FB!	Yes		5 episodes series	
2009	Burraas Jinni	Yes		Short film	
2010	14 February	Yes		5 episodes series	
2011	Furaana Dheynan	Yes	Yes	4 episodes series	
2018	Kani	Yes	Yes	Office drama	
2019	Nama	Yes		Office drama	

== Accolades ==
Year	Award	Category	Nominated work	Result	Ref(s)
2012	2nd Maldives Film Awards	Best Actor	Insaaf	Nominated	
2016	7th Gaumee Film Awards	Best Actor	Insaaf	Nominated	
2016	7th Gaumee Film Awards	Best Costume Design	Loodhifa (Shared with Aminath Nasreena)	Won	
2016	7th Gaumee Film Awards	Best Costume Design	Insaaf (Shared with Ismail Shafeeq and Yoosuf Shafeeu)	Nominated	
2017	8th Gaumee Film Awards	Best Supporting Actor	Ahsham	Won	
2017	8th Gaumee Film Awards	Best Supporting Actor - Short film	Kashfu	Nominated	
2019	9th Gaumee Film Awards	Best Supporting Actor	Vishka	Nominated	
