= Thiyey Mihithuge Vindhakee =

2003 Maldivian romantic television series

- Genre: Romantic drama
- Written by: Ibrahim Waheed (Episode 1–31); Aishath Neena (Episode 32–52)
- Screenplay by: Abdul Faththaah
- Directed by: Abdul Faththaah
- Starring: Mohamed Manik; Sheela Najeeb; Zeenath Abbas
- Country of origin: Maldives
- Original language: Divehi
- No. of seasons: 1
- No. of episodes: 52

Production
- Cinematography: Mohamed Shiyaz; Abdulla Shameel; Abdul Latheef
- Editors: Ahmed Mohamed; Mohamed Jinah; Hassan Nishath; Ahmed Zufar
- Running time: 21–32 minutes

Original release
- Release: 2003 – 2004

Thiey Mihithuge Vindhakee is a 2003 Maldivian romantic television series directed by Abdul Faththaah. The series stars Sheela Najeeb, Mohamed Manik, Zeenath Abbas in lead roles.

== Premise ==
Ahmed Ayaz (Mohamed Manik) visits his parents' island and meets Aminath Nadhiya (Sheela Najeeb) whom he falls deeply in love with, although his mother, Zainab (Haajara Abdul Kareem) finalizes his marriage with another girl. Zainab disapproves their relationship and desperately tries to separate the couple. Ayaz leaves to Male' with his family, promising to return in a few days to bring back Nadhiya, however is met with an accident and dies, on the day he was supposed to depart.

Mohamed Adheel (Mohamed Manik), a lookalike of Ayaz is introduced, who is married to an infertile nurse, Husna (Zeenath Abbas) and desperately trying to conceive a baby. Husna is continuously blackmailed by her ex-husband, Shareef (Ahmed Saeed) who warns her to expose her infertility to Adheel, if she fails to fulfill his demands. Adheel unknowingly visits to Nadhiya's island, accompanied by his friend, Amir (Hassan Afeef). He meets Nadhiya who compares him with Ayaz, someone whom Adheel has never met. Nadhiya agrees to marry Adheel unbeknownst to her of his previous marriage.

== Cast ==
=== Main role ===
- Mohamed Manik as Ahmed Ayaz / Mohamed Adheel
- Sheela Najeeb as Aminath Nadhiya
- Zeenath Abbas as Husna
- Hassan Afeef as Amir
- Ahmed Saeed as Shareef
- Mariyam Shakeela as Zubeidha
- Aminath Rasheedha as Zuhura, Adheel's mother
- Aminath Suneetha as Mariyam
- Niuma Mohamed as Farahanaz

=== Recurring role ===
- Zuleikha Abdul Latheef as Azeeza
- Mohamed Faisal as Moosa
- Sheereen Abdul Wahid as Shimla
- Arifa Ibrahim as Zareena
- Ali Ahmed as Hussain
- Neena Saleem as Inaya; Amir's wife
- Mariyam Haleem as Dhaleyka; Nadhiya's grandmother
- Chilhiya Moosa Manik as Saeed; Ayaz's father
- Ali Shameel as Abdul Samad Hussain
- Ibrahim Wisan as Dr. Nadheem
- Haajara Abdul Kareem as Zainab; Ayaz's mother
- Fathimath Shiuna as Zeyna Qasim
- Hussain Sobah as Dr. Muneer
- Mohamed Afrah as Fauzy

=== Guest role ===
- Waleedha Waleed as Adheel's sister
- Khadheeja Ibrahim Didi as Mizna
- Ismail Hilmy as Moosa
- Ravee Farooq as Shaukath; Amir's colleague
- Abdulla Munaz as a Doctor
- Husnee as Falah
- Ibrahim Rasheed as a magistrate
- Nasih as Haneef
- Ahmed Ziya as Afzal
- Mariyam Zuhura as a doctor

== Development and release ==
The story was based on the novel published by Ibrahim Waheed of the name Hithu Vindhu on Haveeru Daily. Few episodes before the series finale, Waheed was replaced by Aishath Neena.

The series was released in 2003. It was later streamed on digital platform Baiskoaf from 5 July 2020. The series mainly received positive reviews from critics and viewers. Ahmed Adhushan from Mihaaru choose the series among the "Top 5 best series directed by Faththaah". Sajid Abdulla reviewing from MuniAvas selected the series in the "Top 10 best television series of all time" and wrote: "The series will remain one of the best production in television industry. The scenes where Sheela desperately waits for a call from Manik and running on the beach bidding farewell to him are still iconic".

== Soundtrack ==
Track listing
No.	Title	Lyrics	Music	Singer(s)	Length
1.	"Thiey Mihithuge Vindhakee"	Ahmed Nashidh (Dharavandhoo)	Hussain Sobah	Lahufa Faiz, Hussain Sobah
2.	"Nindheveethee Meymathee" (Male Version)	Ahmed Shakeeb	Ayyuman Shareef	Muaviyath Anwar
3.	"Nindheveethee Meymathee" (Female Version)	Ahmed Shakeeb	Ayyuman Shareef	Shifa Thaufeeq
4.	"Andhiri Hayaatheke"	Ahmed Nashidh (Dharavandhoo)	Hussain Sobah	Hussain Sobah
5.	"Kihineh Mi Vevey Loaiybaa"	Ahmed Nashidh (Dharavandhoo)	Hussain Sobah	Aishath Inaya
