= Sheela Najeeb =

Maldivian actress

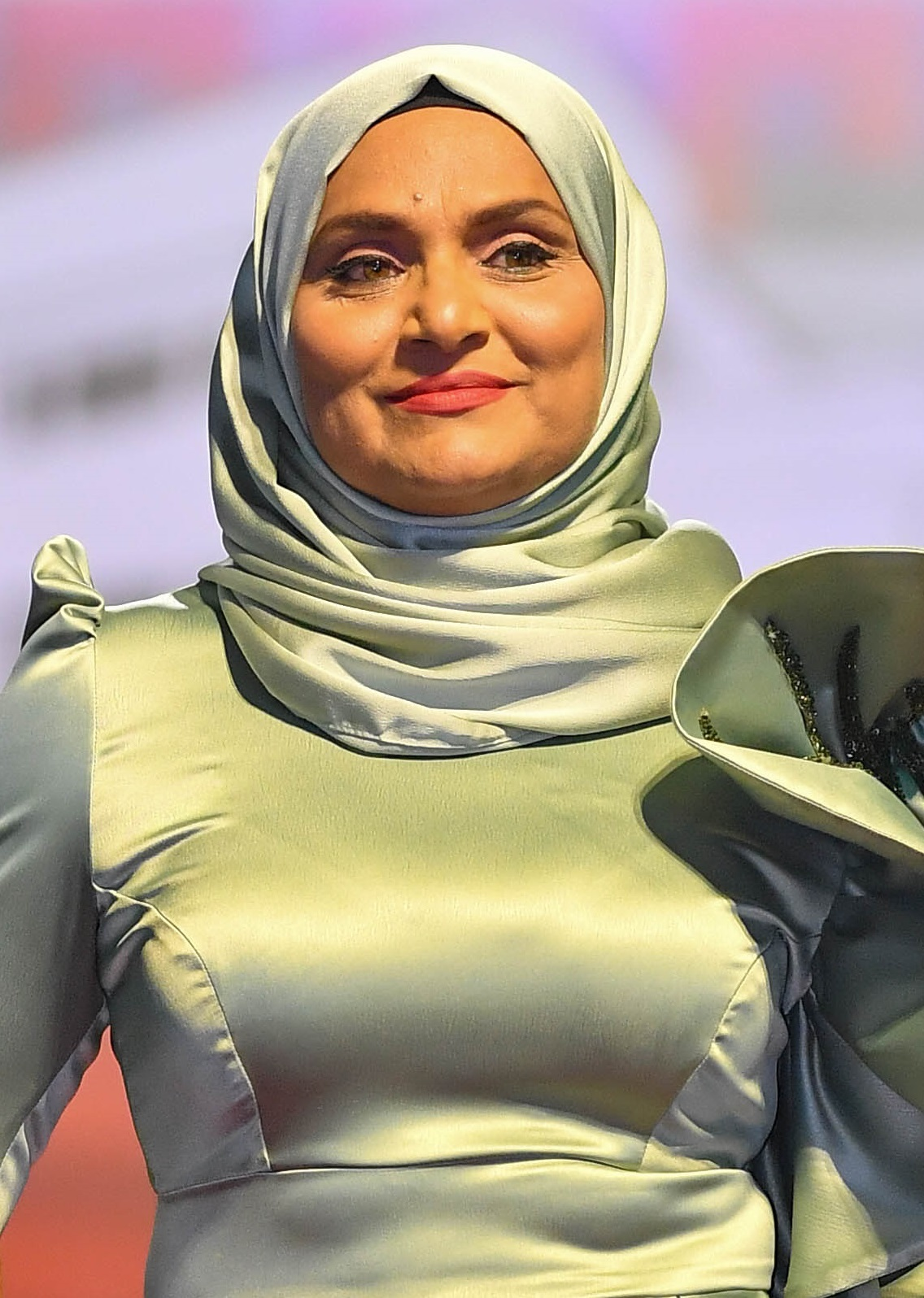
- Born: 7 September 1974 (age 52); S. Hithadhoo, Maldives
- Occupation: Actress
- Years active: 2000–present
- Spouse: Mohamed Manik (m. 2004)
- Children: 3

Sheela Najeeb (born 7 September 1974) is a Maldivian film actress. She has established a career in Maldivian Film Industry and is the recipient of several awards, including one Gaumee Film Awards and two Maldivian Film Awards. She made her screen debut alongside Junaid in a music video "Nudhaashey Magey Loabivaa" and featured in several films thereafter.

In 2001, she gained wider recognition for the lead role in the romance film Hiiy Edhenee; a remake of Dhadkan, followed by Abdul Faththaah's Aan... Aharenves Loabivin (2002) and his horror film Eynaa (2004). She received a Gaumee Film Award for Best Supporting Actress for playing the iniquitous mother in Zuleykha (2005). She went on to establish herself as a leading actress of Maldivian cinema by starring in the horror film Zalzalaa En'buri Aun (2010) resulting in a Gaumee Film Award for Best Actress nomination. During the year played supporting roles in year's two highest grossing films, Niuma (2010) and Heyonuvaane (2010) where her performance gained critical acclaim. Her role as a whistleblower in the former and a ferocious wife in the latter fetched her two Best Supporting Actress nominations.

In 2011, she played several negative characters including a vile woman in E Bappa and a possessive woman in the psychological thriller Zaharu (2011) which fetched her another Best Supporting Actress nomination. Apart from starring in serious roles in films such as Love Story (2012), Emme Fahu Vindha Jehendhen (2015) and 4426 (2016), Najeeb also featured in several comedic roles in Baiveriyaa (2016), 40+ (2019), Maamui (2019), Jokaru (2023) and Bibii (2024). Her performances in these films received positive reviews, with critics praising her emotional depth and comedic timing.

== Career ==
=== 2000–04: Debut and early releases ===
In 2000, Najeeb made her television debut with the role of Aminath, a young woman who, despite being obedient, is coerced by her stepmother into marrying an older businessman, in Abdul Faththaah's television drama series Dhoapatta. The series, which also starred Mohamed Shavin, Niuma Mohamed and Jamsheedha Ahmed, explores themes of unrequited love and the complexities of relationships within and beyond marriage. In the same year she portrayed Zeena, a college student, in Hussain Adil's romance Hiyy Halaaku, opposite Yoosuf Shafeeu and Niuma Mohamed, The plot combines two love triangles set years apart. The first half covers friends on a college campus, while the second tells the story of a widower's young daughter who tries to reunite her dad with his old friend. The film was an unofficial remake of Karan Johar's romantic drama film Kuch Kuch Hota Hai (1998) starring Shah Rukh Khan, Kajol and Rani Mukerji in the lead role.

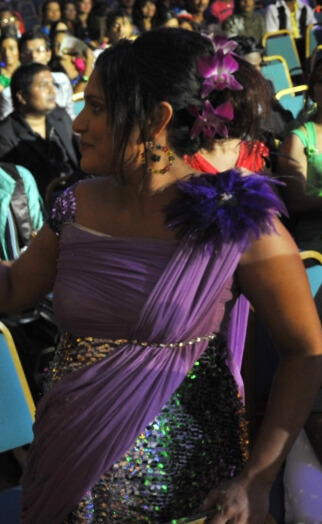
Najeeb at 1st Maldives Film Awards ceremony, 2011

In 2001, Najeeb gained significant acclaim for her role in Aishath Ali Manik's Hiiy Edhenee (2001) which was an unofficial remake of Dharmesh Darshan's romantic film Dhadkan (2000) starring Akshay Kumar, Suniel Shetty and Shilpa Shetty in the lead role. Featured opposite Ali Seezan and Asad Shareef, she played the role of Sheleen Yoosuf, a young woman from a wealthy and influential family, who is forced to marry a man she does not love. She next starred in a brief role opposite Asad Shareef in Ahmed Nimal's melodrama Hilihilaa (2001). Later that year, she featured alongside Yoosuf Shafeeu, Jamsheedha Ahmed, Mohamed Shavin and Ibrahim Giyas in Amjad Ibrahim-directed Aaah (2001), which revolves around two siblings involved in family business and the downfall of the younger brother's love life when he discovers his fiancée is already married to an abusive husband.

Apart from working in Amjad Ibrahim's romantic drama film Kahvalhah Dhaandhen (2002) opposite Yoosuf Shafeeu, Najeeb collaborated with Abdul Faththaah for his drama film Aan... Aharenves Loabivin (2002) starred alongside Ali Seezan, Niuma Mohamed, Aminath Rasheedha and Neena Saleem, where she played Sara, the only child in a family with a troubled relationship and a tragic incident that leads to her character suffering from amnesia. Upon release, the film opened to positive response from critics and performed well commercially.

In 2003, Najeeb rose to widespread prominence for her portrayal of a forbearing second wife in the critically acclaimed television series, Thiyey Mihithuge Vindhakee (2003), directed by Abdul Faththaah. The series was lauded for its high production quality and is regarded as one of the best in Maldivian television. The same year, she collaborated with Amjad Ibrahim for his romantic horror film Dhonkamana (2003). In this project, she played a supporting role in a story about a young man (Yoosuf Shafeeu) who becomes romantically involved with an older woman (Fauziyya Hassan). The film, which also starred Niuma Mohamed, Sheereen Abdul Wahid, Amira Ismail and Aminath Rasheedha, received mostly negative reviews from critics, although the depiction of a romantic relationship with a large age gap was praised.

Najeeb's next notable project was Eynaa (2004), a horror film directed by Abdul Faththaah. In the film, she starred alongside Mohamed Manik, Ahmed Shah, Khadheeja Ibrahim Didi, Ibrahim Jihad and Nashidha Mohamed, portraying one of six colleagues who journey to a haunted, uninhabited island. Eynaa garnered critical acclaim, particularly for its technical aspects, and was a commercial success. During the year, she starred in two television series, including Kamana Vareh Neiy and Loabi Nulibunas, directed by Amjad Ibrahim and Waleedha Waleed respectively.

=== 2005–11: Critical acclaim with supporting roles ===
Najeeb collaborated with Fathimath Nahula for the first time in her critically and commercially successful romantic drama television series, Kalaage Haqqugaa. She replaced Jamsheedha Ahmed after the seventh episode and portrayed the role of Nuzu, a depressive wife mourning the death of her husband. The series received praise for its engaging storyline and character development. Her next collaboration with Nahula was the romantic drama film Zuleykha (2005), which tells the story of a nine-year-old girl seeking to reunite her mother with her lost love. Featuring an ensemble cast including Yoosuf Shafeeu, Mariyam Nisha, Ali Seezan, Mohamed Manik and Mariyam Enash Sinan, Najeeb played the role of a villainous mother. Her performance earned her a Gaumee Film Award for Best Supporting Actress, and the film became the highest-grossing Maldivian release of the year, screening thirty-three housefull shows.

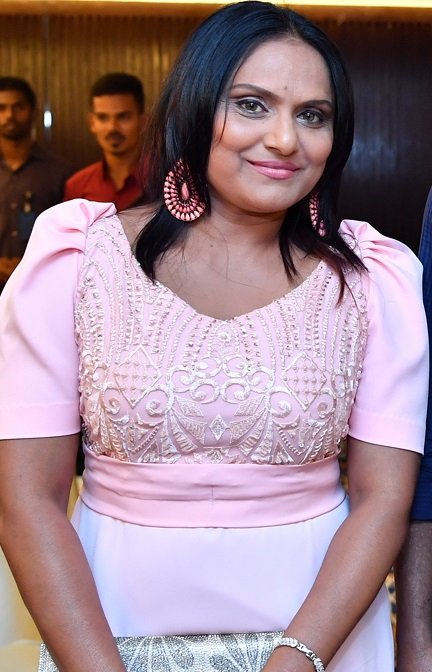
Najeeb at Niuma Mohamed's Silver Jubilee celebration event, 2019

Following this, Najeeb starred in Amjad Ibrahim's romantic drama film Hithuge Edhun (2006), where she portrayed Nisha, a devoted wife abandoned by her husband. The film was well-received, and she earned a Gaumee Film Award nomination as the Best Supporting Actress. In the same year, she worked with Arifa Ibrahim on the romantic television drama series, Vaguthu Faaithu Nuvanees (2006) which follows two best friends in a love triangle. She replaced Mariyam Zuhura in the role of Shazma, a religious and submissive woman mistreated by her brother and sister-in-law. The series was well-received by audiences. The following year, she starred as one of the best friends who gets attracted to an outsider who visits their island for Eid holiday, in her husband's debut direction, Kalaa Dheke Varah Loabivey.

In 2008, Najeeb appeared in Fathimath Nahula's Yoosuf, a romantic drama about a deaf and mute man (played by Yoosuf Shafeeu) mistreated by a wealthy family. Najeeb played the role of a devoted friend to the titular character, which she described as one of the most challenging roles in her career, requiring her to perform many scenes through gestures. The film was a commercial success, earning a Maldives Film Awards for Best Supporting Actress, and was screened at the 2009 SAARC Film Festivals. During the year, she starred in multiple limited television series including the horror thriller Hama Ekani Kalaayahtakai, and Dark Rain Entertainment-produced series titled Yaasmin and Inthihaa. She also played significant roles in three short films released during the year, out of which her performance as an underprivileged wife in Faqeeru Koe (2008) garnered her a Maldives Film Award for Best Actress in the short film category.

In 2009, Najeeb starred in Ahmed Nimal’s E Dharifulhu, a family drama where she played a manipulative wife who tries to murder her sister. She received her first Maldives Film Award for Best Actress for her performance in the film. That year, she also appeared in Loaiybahtakaa (2009), a romantic drama written and directed by Yoosuf Shafeeu, where she portrayed a tailor who marries her best friend. The film, which also starred Fathimath Fareela and Mohamed Faisal, was a commercial success.

In 2010, Najeeb had several notable releases. Her first film of the year was Zalzalaa En'buri Aun, a horror film directed by Ahmed Nimal. It was a spin-off of Aslam Rasheed’s 2000 classic Zalzalaa. She portrayed Shahana, a greedy wife who murders her husband with the help of her secret lover. The film received mixed reviews from critics but performed average business at the box office. Despite the film’s lukewarm reception, Najeeb was nominated for Best Actress at the 6th Gaumee Film Awards, for her performance in the film. She next starred in Niuma Mohamed's directorial debut Niuma (2010), alongside Yoosuf Shafeeu, Mohamed Manik, Aminath Rasheedha and Abdulla Muaz. She played the role of Aminath, a whistleblower who attempts to protect her sister-in-law from being sexually abused by her father and brother. Upon release, the film received widespread critical acclaim, particularly praising the performances of the cast and the powerful dialogues. Her performance was widely appreciated, with many critics noting her dynamic expressions and emotions throughout the film. The film was a massive commercial success, screening over thirty housefull shows and becoming the highest-grossing Maldivian release of the year. At the 6th Gaumee Film Awards, she received a nomination for Best Supporting Actress, and she won the same category at the 2nd Maldives Film Awards.

The last release of 2010 was Heyonuvaane, a drama film directed by Yoosuf Shafeeu. In this film, she played the role of a ferocious wife who discriminates against and abuses her underprivileged husband. The film received mixed reviews from critics, but Najeeb’s performance stood out as a highlight. Critic Ahmed Naif from Sun remarked that Najeeb’s portrayal was the best performance from a heroine in that year. Despite the negative reception, the film became the second highest-grossing Maldivian release of the year, screening twenty-two housefull shows.

In 2011, Najeeb featured in two films, both of which failed to impress critics and audiences, although her performances were noted as the best from the cast. She appeared in Ali Shifau's psychological romantic thriller Zaharu alongside Ali Seezan and Niuma Mohamed. The film, inspired by the 1987 American thriller Fatal Attraction, centers on a married man who has an affair with a woman who becomes obsessed with him. She portrayed Shaheen, a devious woman who tries to trap her former school crush. The film was considered a flop at the box office, but Najeeb received a Best Supporting Actress nomination at both the 7th Gaumee Film Awards, and the 2nd Maldives Film Awards. Najeeb also starred in Yoosuf Shafeeu’s family drama E Bappa (2011), which received negative reviews and was a box office failure. However, her performance was praised by critics.

=== 2012–23: Mature and comedy roles ===
Najeeb's only release of 2012 was Abdul Faththaah's romantic film Love Story (2012), in which she starred alongside Ali Seezan, Amira Ismail and Aishath Rishmy. The film received negative response from critics. Displeased with the screenplay and performance of the actors, Ahmed Nadheem of Haveeru criticized the screenplay and the actors' performances, stating that none of the characters were well-developed, and the excessive emotional scenes led to overacting.

In 2014, Najeeb starred in Raanee opposite Mohamed Manik and Fathimath Azifa, portraying Mariyam, a woman consumed by greed for money and fame. The film was an unofficial remake of Raj Kanwar's melodrama film Judaai (1997). A reviewer from Avas ccriticized the overall production, writing: "Even though the actors give their best with earnest performances, the weak screenplay and poor direction could not save this film. It pales in comparison to the original and should have been left untouched".

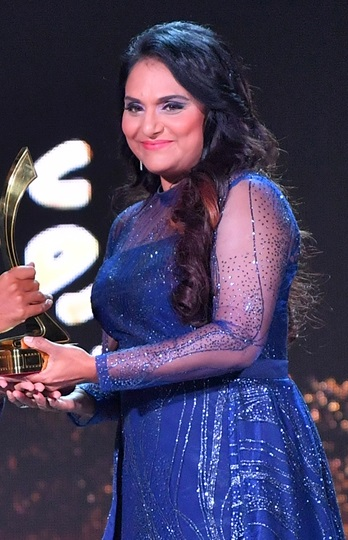
Najeeb at 9th Gaumee Film Awards ceremony, 2019

In 2015, Najeeb appeared in Ali Shifau-directed romantic film Emme Fahu Vindha Jehendhen alongside Mohamed Jumayyil and Mariyam Majudha. In a pre-premiere review from Vaguthu, Ismail Nail praised her performance alongside that of Mohamed Manik. The film was the highest-grossing Maldivian release of the year and achieved significant commercial success. Later that year, she collaborated with Fathimath Nahula and Aishath Rishmy on the television series Vakivumuge Kurin.

The following year, Najeeb played the role of Ruby, one of a group of friends trapped in a haunted house, in Fathimath Nahula's horror film 4426 (2016). The film received positive reviews upon release, with Ahmed Nadheem of Avas describing it as a "masterpiece" and noting Najeeb's performance as commendable. With twenty-five consecutive sold-out screenings, the film became the highest-grossing release of the year. Her second release of the year was Yoosuf Shafeeu's comedy Baiveriyaa (2016), an ensemble film about an aspiring actress fleeing her family to pursue a career, resulting in suspicions and misunderstandings. The film was well received, with Nazim Hassan of Avas praising the comedic timing of the cast and highlighting the heated exchanges between Shafeeu and Najeeb as standouts. He remarked, "No one could have portrayed Riyasha's role better than Najeeb, capturing the character's on-screen malice flawlessly". The film emerged as one of the highest grossing films of the year.

2018 was a dull year for Maldivian film-industry with regards to 2018 Maldivian presidential election. Her only release of the year was Huvaa, the first Maldivian web series, a romantic drama by Fathimath Nahula. The series depicted the disintegration of a once-happy family following a tragic incident. Najeeb’s portrayal of a widow grappling with the loss of her husband received positive feedback, with viewers and critics commending her emotionally resonant performance.

The following year, she starred in Yoosuf Shafeeu's horror comedy 40+ (2019), a sequel to 2017 comedy Naughty 40. The film received positive reviews from critics and performed well commercially, further solidifying Najeeb’s reputation as a versatile actress in the Maldivian entertainment industry. This was followed by her comical performance in Ali Shifau's Maamui (2019), where she portrayed the role Vargina Saeed, an overprotective mother who is insecure of her daughter-in-law. Upon its release, the film received mainly positive reviews from critics, with much of the praise directed for Najeeb for her comical performance. During the year, she starred in several web series out of which her performance as the caring and senive mother in the web series Ehenas, directed by Ravee Farooq. Aishath Maahaa reviewing from Dho? praised the realistic portrayal of mother-son relationship and acting performance of Najeeb for her consistency throughout her career.

In 2020, Najeeb starred alongside Aminath Rishfa and Ali Seezan in the romantic drama film Andhirikan, where she portrayed a pregnant wife striving to win back her husband's love. Upon release, the film received mixed reviews from critics and due to COVID-19 pandemic it was pulled from theaters after only four screenings. The following year, she collaborated with Dark Rain Entertainment on the romantic comedy sitcom Rumi á Jannat for another comical role, which revolves around a newlywed navigating the early days of marriage with a partner who has vastly different worldviews and personality traits.

In 2023, Najeeb appeared in another comedic role in Yoosuf Shafeeu-directed film Jokaru. The story follows a trio of thugs pursuing a suitcase, leading to a series of comical misadventures. Aminath Luba from The Press describing it as a "laughing riot" and praising the performances of veteran actors. However, Luba criticized the film’s "lagging" first half and the excessive humor, which she considered a drawback.

=== 2024–present: Further releases ===
In 2024, Najeeb collaborated with Dark Rain Entertainment for Shahudha Mahmoodh's debut direction, Bibii. The movie combines elements of comedy and horror as it follows a married couple whose lives take a chaotic turn after moving into an allegedly haunted house. In the film she plays the role of the mother-in-law who tries to lift the curse with the help of her boyfriend. Upon release, the film garnered mainly positive reviews from critics for its unique genre approach and performances. Ahmed Hameed Adam from Minoos picked the comedic performances of Najeeb and Ahmed Saeed as one of the standout elements of the film. Aminath Luba of The Press similarly described Najeeb as perfectly suited for comedy roles.

== Media image ==
In 2011, Najeeb was selected in the top five as the "Most Entertaining Actress" in the SunFM Awards 2010, an award night ceremony initiated by Sun Media Group to honour the most recognized personalities in different fields, during the previous year. In 2012, she was ranked at the fifth position in the list of "Best Actresses in Maldives" compiled by Haveeru, where writer Ahmed Nadheem credited her "powerful performance" in Thiyey Mihithuge Vindhakee for the same. In 2018, she was ranked in the second place from Dho?'s list of Top Ten Actresses of Maldives where writer Aishath Maaha opined that Najeeb is the "perfect choice for any role from a vile to a soft-spoken woman".

== Filmography ==
=== Feature film ===
| Year | Title | Role | Notes | Ref(s) |
|---|---|---|---|---|
| 2000 | Hiyy Halaaku | Zeena Saleem | | |
| 2001 | Hiiy Edhenee | Sheleen Yoosuf | | |
| 2001 | Hilihilaa | Haseena | | |
| 2001 | Aaah | Ruwaisha | | |
| 2002 | Kahvalhah Dhaandhen | Yashmee | | |
| 2002 | Aan... Aharenves Loabivin | Sara | | |
| 2003 | Dhonkamana | Zaana | | |
| 2004 | Eynaa | Malakaa | | |
| 2005 | Zuleykha | Ashiya | Gaumee Film Award for Best Supporting Actress | |
| 2006 | Hithuge Edhun | Nisha | Nominated—Gaumee Film Award for Best Supporting Actress | |
| 2008 | Yoosuf | Mary | Maldives Film Award for Best Supporting Actress | |
| 2009 | E Dharifulhu | Maasha | Nominated—Maldives Film Award for Best Actress | |
| 2009 | Loaiybahtakaa | Reysham | | |
| 2010 | Dhin Veynuge Hithaamaigaa | Herself | Special appearance in the song "Annaashey Hinithun Velamaa" | |
| 2010 | Zalzalaa En'buri Aun | Shahana | Nominated—Gaumee Film Award for Best Actress | |
| 2010 | Mi Hiyy Keekkuraanee? | Jennifer | | |
| 2010 | Niuma | Aminath | Nominated—Gaumee Film Award for Best Supporting Actress; Maldives Film Award for Best Supporting Actress | |
| 2010 | Heyonuvaane | Muna | Nominated—Gaumee Film Award for Best Supporting Actress | |
| 2011 | Zaharu | Shaheen | Nominated—Gaumee Film Award for Best Supporting Actress; Nominated—Maldives Film Award for Best Supporting Actress | |
| 2011 | E Bappa | Sabeeaa | | |
| 2012 | Love Story | Afiya | | |
| 2014 | Raanee | Mariyam | | |
| 2015 | Emme Fahu Vindha Jehendhen | Inaya | | |
| 2016 | 4426 | Ruby | | |
| 2016 | Baiveriyaa | Riyasha | | |
| 2019 | 40+ | Zarifa | | |
| 2019 | Maamui | Vargina Saeed | | |
| 2020 | Andhirikan | Aroosha | | |
| 2023 | Jokaru | Bareeka | | |
| 2024 | Bibii | Nishana | | |
| 2025 | Sorry | Sama | | |
| 2025 | Kan'bulo | Nafeesa | | |
| 2025 | Alifaan | Fareedha | | |
| 2025 | Alvadhaau | Afiya Saleem | | |
| 2026 | Paree – Chapter 1 | Laisha | | |
| 2026 | Paree – Chapter 2 | Laisha | | |
| 2026 | Magey Bituge Wedding | Zoona | | |
| 2026 | Keevve? † | Fidha | | |

=== Television ===
| Year | Title | Role | Notes | Ref(s) |
|---|---|---|---|---|
| 2000 | Dhoapatta | Aminath | Main role; 3 episodes | |
| 2002 | Fahu Fiyavalhu | Yumna Easa | Main role; 5 episodes | |
| 2003 | Ruheveynee Kon Hithakun? | | Teledrama | |
| 2003–2005 | Thiyey Mihithuge Vindhakee | Aminath Nadhiya | Main role; 51 episodes | |
| 2004 | Kamana Vareh Neiy | Lubna | Main role; 5 episodes | |
| 2004–2005 | Loabi Nulibunas | Dheena | Main role; 8 episodes | |
| 2005 | Loabi Vaanama | Nisha | Main role; 13 episodes | |
| 2005 | Kalaage Haqqugaa | Nuzu | Main role | |
| 2006–2007 | Vaguthu Faaithu Nuvanees | Shazma | Main role; 17 episodes | |
| 2007 | Kalaa Dheke Varah Loabivey | Nadha | Main role; 12 episodes | |
| 2008 | Hammaa Muhammaa | | | |
| 2008 | Yaasmin | Yaasmin | Main role; 5 episodes | |
| 2008 | Inthihaa | Nuha | Main role; 13 episodes | |
| 2008 | Hama Ekani Kalaayahtakai | Shiyana | Main role; 5 episodes | |
| 2010 | Thiya Loabeegai Abadhahme Vaanamey | Shaina | 4 episodes mini-series | |
| 2011 | Hiyy Vanee Inthizaarugai | Suha | Main role | |
| 2012 | Case 34 | Asima | Teledrama | |
| 2015 | Vakivumuge Kurin | Rose | Main role; 10 episodes | |
| 2018–2020 | Huvaa | Sheeza | Main role; 62 episodes | |
| 2019 | Shhh | Ram | 2 episodes | |
| 2019 | Haasaa | Shiya | Guest role: "Episode 13" | |
| 2019–2020 | Ehenas | Shakeela | Main role | |
| 2021 | Rumi á Jannat | Filameena | Main role; 12 episodes | |
| 2022 | Giritee Loabi | Shaira | Guest role; "Episode 22" | |
| 2022 | Bridge | Areesha | Main role; 10 episodes | |
| 2023 | Fandu | Saleema | Recurring role; 2 episodes | |
| 2024 | Dark Rain Chronicles | Aafiya | Main role in the segment "Baiskalu" | |
| 2024 | Badhalu | Noor's mother | Main role in the segment "Memories" | |
| 2024 | Yaaraa | Kelly's mother | Guest role; "Episode 49" | |
| 2024–2025 | Roaleemay | Raniya | Main role; 15 episodes | |
| 2025 | Hinthaa | Najuma | Recurring role; 2 episodes | |
| 2025 | Loaiybahtakaa | Zulfa | Main role; 6 episodes | |
| 2026 | JunJulaa | Yumna | | |

=== Short film ===
| Year | Title | Role | Notes |
|---|---|---|---|
| 2001 | Paree Dhahtha | Paree Dhahtha | |
| 2007 | Kudafoolhaai Paree Dhahtha | Paree Dhahtha | |
| 2008 | E Sirru | Shaaniya | |
| 2008 | Ummeedh | Unnamed | Special appearance |
| 2008 | Faqeeru Koe | Sanfa Fulhu | Maldives Film Award for Best Actress - Short Film |
| 2009 | Bulhaa Dhombe | Raaid's mother | |
| 2010 | Nu Ufan Dhari | Nasiha | |
| 2010 | Muhammaage Briefcase | Hareera | |

== Accolades ==
| Year | Award | Category | Nominated work | Result | Ref(s) |
|---|---|---|---|---|---|
| 2007 | National Award of Recognition | Performing Arts - Acting | | Won | |
| 2007 | 4th Gaumee Film Awards | Best Supporting Actress | Zuleykha | Won | |
| 2008 | 5th Gaumee Film Awards | Best Supporting Actress | Hithuge Edhun | Nominated | |
| 2011 | 1st Maldives Film Awards | Best Actress | E Dharifulhu | Nominated | |
| 2011 | 1st Maldives Film Awards | Best Supporting Actress | Yoosuf | Won | |
| 2011 | 1st Maldives Film Awards | Best Actress - Short Film | Faqeeru Koe | Won | |
| 2011 | 2nd SunFM Awards | Most Entertaining Actress | | Nominated | |
| 2012 | 2nd Maldives Film Awards | Best Supporting Actress | Niuma | Won | |
| 2015 | 6th Gaumee Film Awards | Best Actress | Zalzalaa En'buri Aun | Nominated | |
| 2015 | 6th Gaumee Film Awards | Best Supporting Actress | Niuma | Nominated | |
| 2015 | 6th Gaumee Film Awards | Best Supporting Actress | Heyonuvaane | Nominated | |
| 2016 | 7th Gaumee Film Awards | Best Supporting Actress | Zaharu | Nominated | |
| 2025 | 1st MSPA Film Awards | Best Comedian | Maamui | Nominated | |
