= Yes Sir (web series) =

2019 Maldivian web series

- Created by: Ali Seezan
- Written by: Fathimath Waheedha
- Directed by: Ali Seezan
- Starring: Mohamed Manik; Aminath Nishfa; Nuzuhath Shuaib; Ali Azim; Irufana Ibrahim; Ismail Jumaih; Mohamed Nawaal; Zeenath Abbas; Fahudh; Mohamed Faisal
- Music by: Ibrahim Nifar
- Country of origin: Maldives
- Original language: Divehi
- No. of seasons: 1
- No. of episodes: 10

Production
- Producer: Baiskoafu
- Cinematography: Shivaz Abdulla

Original release
- Release: 11 August – 16 November 2019

Yes Sir is a 2019 Maldivian comedy web series directed by Ali Seezan. The series stars Mohamed Manik, Aminath Nishfa, Irufana Ibrahim, Ismail Jumaih and Mohamed Nawaal as police officers, and Nuzuhath Shuaib, Ali Azim, Zeenath Abbas and Mohamed Faisal as various characters.

== Cast ==
- Mohamed Manik as Qadhir
- Aminath Nishfa as Haneefa Ibrahim
- Nuzuhath Shuaib as Ribena Mohamed/Lailaa/Sheereen/Kaiydha
- Ali Azim as Farooq/Moosa/Naseer/Hassan
- Irufana Ibrahim as Aishath Athoofa Musthafa
- Ismail Jumaih as Abdulla Muaz
- Mohamed Nawaal as Sunil Petty
- Zeenath Abbas as Lailaa/Zahira
- Fahudh as Basheer "Barbie" Adnan
- Mohamed Faisal as Abdul Satthar/Karan Bohar/Ranveer

== Episodes ==
| No. in season | Title | Directed by | Original release date |
|---|---|---|---|
| 1 | "Episode 01" | Ali Seezan | August 11, 2019 |
A station in-charge, Abdulla Muaz (Ismail Jumaih) is newly assigned to the island's police station, who is exposed to the corrupt environment of the station. Deputy station in-charge, Haneefa Ibrahim (Aminath Nishfa) covers up for the corrupt act which Muaz discredits. Lailaa (Zeenath Abbas) who suffers from pseudobulbar affect, files a missing person report of her husband Farooq (Ali Azim).
| 2 | "Episode 02" | Ali Seezan | August 21, 2019 |
Station's receptionist, Aishath Athoofa Musthafa (Irufana Ibrahim) flirts with Muaz. Haneefa tries every possible way to regain the money from Muaz. Moosa (Ali Azim) files a complaint regarding some paranormal activities at his house. Police investigates and exposes his wife, Ribena Mohamed's (Nuzuhath Shuaib) involvement in it.
| 3 | "Episode 03" | Ali Seezan | August 28, 2019 |
| 4 | "Episode 04" | Ali Seezan | September 4, 2019 |
| 5 | "Episode 05" | Ali Seezan | September 11, 2019 |
| 6 | "Episode 06" | Ali Seezan | September 18, 2019 |
| 7 | "Episode 07" | Ali Seezan | September 25, 2019 |
| 8 | "Episode 08" | Ali Seezan | October 2, 2019 |
| 9 | "Episode 09" | Ali Seezan | October 9, 2019 |
| 10 | "Episode 10" | Ali Seezan | October 16, 2019 |

== Release ==
The first episode of the series was streamed on 11 August 2019. Rest of the nine episodes from the season were streamed on every Wednesday of the week. Upon release, the series received mixed reviews from critics.
