= Raanee =

2014 film

- Official film poster
- Directed by: Mohamed Aboobakuru
- Written by: Hussain Rasheed
- Screenplay by: Mohamed Aboobakuru
- Produced by: Hussain Rasheed
- Starring: Mohamed Manik; Sheela Najeeb; Fathimath Azifa
- Cinematography: Mohamed Aboobakuru
- Edited by: Mohamed Aboobakuru
- Music by: Ayyuman Shareef
- Production company: Emboomaa Studio
- Release date: May 29, 2014
- Running time: 130 minutes
- Country: Maldives
- Language: Dhivehi

Raanee is a 2014 Maldivian melodrama film directed by Mohamed Aboobakuru. Produced by Hussain Rasheed under Emboomaa Studio, the film stars Mohamed Manik, Sheela Najeeb and Fathimath Azifa in pivotal roles. The film was an unofficial remake of Raj Kanwar's melodrama film Judaai (1997) starring Anil Kapoor, Sridevi and Urmila Matondkar. The film was released on 29 May 2014 and received negative reviews from critics.

== Premise ==
Ismail (Mohamed Manik), an honest and dedicated staff working under the wealthy businessman, Adam Manik (Ahmed Nimal), is married to an ungrateful woman, Mariyam (Sheela Najeeb) who thirsts for money and fame. Adam Manik's daughter, Nathasha (Fathimath Azifa) returns from abroad and works at her father's firm, where she falls in love with Ismail, witnessing his integrity and commitment. However she becomes heartbroken when she discovers that Ismail is a married man with two kids. Failed to convince Ismail into marrying her as his second wife, Nathasha offers two million rufiyaa in exchange for marriage to Ismail which she accepts on the spot.

== Cast ==
- Mohamed Manik as Ismail
- Sheela Najeeb as Mariyam
- Fathimath Azifa as Nathasha
- Ahmed Nimal as Adam Manik
- Mohamed Waheed as Mariyam's father
- Sarah Binthi Mohamed as Maiha
- Mohamed Aik Ashraf Rasheed as Namhan
- Ali Mahir
- Ali Ismail

== Soundtrack ==
Track listing
No.	Title	Lyrics	Music	Singer(s)	Length
1.	"Oagaave Bunamey"	Ahmed Nashid	Hussain Sobah	Hassan Ilham, Rafiyath Rameeza

== Release and response ==
The film was released on 29 May 2014. Upon release, it received mainly negative reviews from critics. A reviewer from Avas criticised the whole production of the film and wrote: "Even though the actors give their best with their earnest performances, the weak screenplay and the awful direction could not save this ship from sinking. A total snooze fest no where close to the original, which shall be best left undone".
