= Neydhen Vakivaakah =

2017 Maldivian romantic film

- Official film poster
- Directed by: Mohamed Aboobakuru
- Written by: Mahdi Ahmed
- Screenplay by: Mahdi Ahmed
- Produced by: ME Production
- Starring: Jadhulla Ismail; Fathimath Azifa; Yoosuf Shafeeu
- Cinematography: Ibrahim Wisan
- Edited by: Mohamed Aboobakuru
- Music by: Ayyuman Shareef
- Production company: ME Production
- Release date: September 27, 2017
- Running time: 133 minutes
- Country: Maldives
- Language: Dhivehi

Neydhen Vakivaakah is a 2017 Maldivian romantic film directed by Mohamed Aboobakuru. Produced under ME Production, the film stars Jadhulla Ismail, Fathimath Azifa, and Yoosuf Shafeeu in pivotal roles. The film was released on 27 September 2017.

== Premise ==
Aishath Zeena (Fathimath Azifa) is proposed by her fiancé, Nadheem (Ahmed Azmeel), but their happiness is short-lived since the latter is met with a fatal accident on his way back home. Depressed, she moves back to her homeland, where she meet a simple and diffident young man, Nizam (Jadhulla Ismail) who happens to visit her island, for a wedding reception of a friend. Soon after, a romantic relationship builds between them. However, Nizam has to abruptly leave to abroad to start his college education and an envious man interfere in their relationship. As Zeena tries to move on from her ill-fated relationships, she meets Shihan (Yoosuf Shafeeu), brother of Nizam.

== Cast ==
- Yoosuf Shafeeu as Shihan
- Jadhulla Ismail as Ahmed Nizam
- Fathimath Azifa as Aishath Zeena
- Ahmed Saeed as Imthiyaz
- Arifa Ibrahim as Shihan & Nizam's mother
- Ahmed Azmeel as Nadheem (special appearance)
- Nashidha Mohamed as Sheeza
- Aishath Junaina
- Ali Shahid as Areef
- Ibrahim Riyaz
- Ibrahim Naseer
- Zoya Rasheedh as Meera
- Zeenath
- Sanfa Ibrahim
- Maahi Mohamed
- Ismail Areef
- Zeeshan
- Maria Teresa Pagano as Cari (special appearance)

== Soundtrack ==
Track listing
No.	Title	Lyrics	Singer(s)	Length
1.	"Neydhen Vakivaakah"	Mohamed Abdul Ghanee	Mohamed Abdul Ghanee	04:39
2.	"Abadhu Ekugaa Vaanee"	Mohamed Abdul Ghanee	Mohamed Abdul Ghanee, Mariyam Ashfa	04:55
3.	"Ishqu Hithuge Edhenee Yaaraa"	Mohamed Abdul Ghanee	Mohamed Abdul Ghanee	04:14
4.	"Mendhan Veemaa"	Mohamed Abdul Ghanee	Mumthaz Moosa, Rafiyath Rameeza	03:49
Total length:				17:39

== Release and reception ==
The film was released on 27 September 2017. Upon release, the film received mixed reviews from critics. Mariyam Waheedha reviewing from Miadhu particularly praised the acting performance of Fathimath Azifa, Yoosuf Shafeeu and Arifa Ibrahim calling them "reliable" while she found Ismail's performance "good enough" for a debut.
