= Andhirikan =

- Official film poster
- Directed by: Ali Seezan
- Written by: Ahmed Zareer
- Screenplay by: Ahmed Zareer
- Produced by: Shivaz Abdulla; Ali Seezan
- Starring: Ali Seezan; Aminath Rishfa; Sheela Najeeb
- Cinematography: Shivaz Abdulla
- Edited by: Ali Seezan
- Music by: Ibrahim Nifar
- Production companies: S Productions; Maskey Studio
- Release date: March 4, 2020
- Country: Maldives
- Language: Dhivehi

Andhirikan (English: darkness) is a 2020 Maldivian romantic drama film directed by Ali Seezan. Produced by Seezan and Shivaz Abdulla under S Productions and Maskey Studio, the film stars Seezan, Aminath Rishfa and Sheela Najeeb in pivotal roles.

== Premise ==
Nihan (Ali Seezan), happily married to Aroosha (Sheela Najeeb) manages his own business and is expecting their first child after two miscarriages. However, another miscarriage and the news that she can no longer conceive leads to an emotional despair. Nihan's childhood friend, Leeza keeps providing them with the emotional support and assistance while trying to move on from her complicated relationship with Hashim (Ahmed Saeed). Meanwhile, Leeza's manipulative aunt, Fareedha (Mariyam Shakeela) grasps the opportunity to convince Aroosha to accept Leeza as the second wife of Nihan. However, things take an unexpected turn, when Leeza takes control of their marriage and Nihan prioritizes Leeza over Aroosha.

== Cast ==
- Ali Seezan as Nihan
- Aminath Rishfa as Leeza
- Sheela Najeeb as Aroosha
- Mohamed Rasheed as Faththaah; Nihan's father
- Mariyam Shakeela as Fareedha
- Ahmed Saeed as Hashim
- Zeenath Abbas as Athika
- Aminath Nisha Rasheed as Aroosha's friend
- Nazeeh as HR Intern.

== Development ==
The project was announced in August 2019 as Seezan's next directorial venture after Vafaatheri Kehiveriya (2016). Filming commenced on 23 August 2019 in M. Maduvvaree. Shooting was completed on 10 October 2019, about two weeks prior to the initially announced release date. A week after the ticket sales for the film kick-off, the mastering file becomes corrupted, which delayed the post production of the film for months.

== Soundtrack ==
Track listing
No.	Title	Lyrics	Music	Singer(s)	Length
1.	"Kiyaa Miee Loabi Hey?"	Mohamed Abdul Ghanee	Hussain Sobah	Aleef Ali, Shifa Thaufeeq	3:35
2.	"Andhirikan" (Title Track)	Mohamed Abdul Ghanee	Ibrahim Zaid Ali	Mohamed Abdul Ghanee, Mariyam Ashfa	4:34

== Release ==
On 19 September 2019, a teaser trailer of Andhirikan was released, announcing the premiere date as 22 October 2019. On 15 October 2019, a week prior to its release date, the production team announced that the film release is delayed indefinitely due to a "corrupted file" in post production. The official trailer of the film was revealed on 1 February 2020, while announcing the release date of film as 4 March 2020. After four shows of the film were screened, it was pulled from the theater due to COVID-19 pandemic.
