= Furaana Dheynan =

Maldivian television series

- Written by: Mariyam Moosa
- Screenplay by: Ahmed Saeed
- Directed by: Ahmed Saeed
- Music by: Hussain Sobah
- Country of origin: Maldives
- Original language: Dhivehi
- No. of seasons: 1
- No. of episodes: 4

Production
- Cinematography: Ibrahim Wisan
- Editor: Ali Musthafa
- Running time: 23–25 minutes

Original release
- Release: 2011

Furaana Dheynan is a 2011 Maldivian television mini-series developed for Television Maldives by Ahmed Saeed. The series focusing on the inevitable fate between a couple that are destined to be separated, stars Fathimath Azifa and Ibrahim Jihad in lead roles.

== Cast ==
=== Main ===
- Fathimath Azifa as Aishath Rizna
- Ibrahim Jihad as Nahid

=== Recurring ===
- Mariyam Shahuza as Fathimath
- Ajunaz Ali as Wajeeh

=== Guest ===
- Mariyam Haleem as Aneesa; Nahid's mother (Episode 3)
- Mohamed Waheed as Adnan; Nahid's step-father (Episode 3)

== Episodes ==
No. in season	Title	Directed by
1	"Episode 1"	Ahmed Saeed
Aishath Rizna (Fathimath Azifa), an orphan, living with her cousin, Fathimath (Mariyam Shahuza) is followed by an ordinary man, Nahid (Ibrahim Jihad). Realizing his deep attraction towards her, Rizna decides to marry him.
2	"Episode 2"	Ahmed Saeed
Rizna's expectation for Nahid as an ideal husband steeps low with his irresponsibility and lack of attention to her due to his over-commitment to work. Fathimath accuses Nihad having an extra-marital affair and advises Rizna to spy on him. One day, while the couple were on their way to a lunch date, they meet with a fatal accident where Rizna bleeds to death.
3	"Episode 3"	Ahmed Saeed
Nahid wakes up from the tragic dream and is mentally disturbed with the incident and the fact that his dream sequences prior to the accident keep repeating in the real world. The fear of losing her results in a complete change in his behavior, where he starts spending all day with her, giving all the love and affection she yearns for.
4	"Episode 4"	Ahmed Saeed
The couple spends their happiest days until Nahid's dream sequence of the accident happens in real life at the cost of Nahid's life.

== Soundtrack ==
Track listing
No.	Title	Singer(s)	Length
1.	"Furaana Dheynan"	Rafiyath Rameeza, Mohamed Farhad
