= Kaaku? =

- Official film poster
- Directed by: Mohamed Aboobakuru
- Written by: Mohamed Aboobakuru
- Screenplay by: Mahdi Ahmed
- Starring: Ibrahim Sobah; Shafiu Mohamed; Irufana Ibrahim; Aishath Yasira
- Cinematography: Mohamed Aboobakuru
- Edited by: Mohamed Aboobakuru
- Music by: Sol series
- Production company: Me Production
- Release date: August 10, 2019
- Country: Maldives
- Language: Dhivehi

Kaaku? is a 2019 Maldivian romantic horror film directed by Mohamed Aboobakuru. Produced under Me Production, the film stars Ibrahim Sobah, Shafiu Mohamed and Irufana Ibrahim in pivotal roles. The film was released on 24 September 2019.

== Cast ==
- Hamid Ali as Ayyoob
- Aishath Yasira as Reema
- Irufana Ibrahim as Soby
- Shafiu Mohamed as Naushad
- Ibrahim Sobah as Fazeen
- Nazima Mohamed as Naahidhaa
- Rizwana Ibrahim as Azu
- Abdullah Waheed as Kareembe
- Mohamed Adam as Shopkeeper
- Abbas Adam as Hussainbe
- Mohamed Aboobakuru as Policeman (special appearance)

== Development ==
Filming was started on 26 October 2018 in HDh. Kulhudhuffushi and was completed in twenty days.

== Soundtrack ==
Track listing
No.	Title	Lyrics	Singer(s)	Length
1.	"Maayoos Vefaa"	Mohamed Abdul Ghanee	Mohamed Abdul Ghanee	04:32
2.	"Bunebalaashey Kalaa"	Mohamed Waheed	Ismail Shiyar	04:48
3.	"Sihuru"	Haroon Abdul Gafoor	Hussain

== Release ==
The teaser trailer of the film was released on 4 March 2019. The release date of the film was announced to be 10 August 2019 and was later moved to 24 September 2019.

== Accolades ==
Award	Category	Recipients	Result	Ref.
1st MSPA Film Awards	Best Child Artist	Rizwana Ibrahim	Nominated	
