= Ahmed Azmeel =

Maldivian film actor

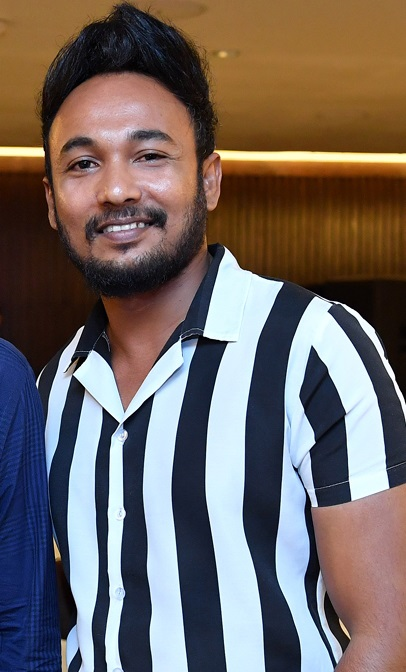
- Azmeel at Niuma Mohamed's Silver Jubilee celebration event, 2019
- Occupations: Actor, director, choreographer, editor
- Years active: 2010–present
- Spouse: Aishath Rishmy (m. 2007; div. 2013)
- Children: Ismail Aziel Azmeel

Ahmed Azmeel is a Maldivian film actor, director and producer.

== Career ==
=== 1999–2009: Music videos ===
In 2004, Azmeel made a brief appearance in Yoosuf Shafeeu directed horror film Edhathuru (2004) which revolves around eight friends who go on a picnic to a haunted uninhabited island and their battle for survival. The film garnered critical appreciation specially for its sound effect and was a commercial success. He made his television debut as a caring friend in the Arifa Ibrahim-directed critically acclaimed television series, Vairoalhi Ahves Sirrun (2005) which revolves around two best-friends involved in extra-marital affairs and who fail to practice their duty as husband and wife. Starring alongside Niuma Mohamed, Ahmed Asim, Aminath Rasheedha and Mariyam Shakeela, the series was listed as one of the most successful television series. The following year, Azmeel again collaborated with the team of Vairoalhi Ahves Sirrun for Arifa Ibrahim's another romantic television drama series, Vaguthu Faaithu Nuvanees (2006) which consists of fifty episodes. The series which follows the vengeance and retribution two best-friends go through when they both love the same person, features Azmeel in a recurring role as a strong-minded and caring friend.

In 2009, Azmeel collaborated with Amjad Ibrahim for his horror film Baaraige Fas, cast alongside Hussain Sobah, Mariyam Nisha, Ali Shameel, Mariyam Shakeela and Amira Ismail. The film follows a temptress vampire who goes into a killing spree to quench her thirst. The film received mainly negative reviews from critics.

=== 2010–present: Film debut and into profession ===
Azmeel officially made his film debut in Aishath Rishmy-directed Fanaa (2010) alongside Rishmy and Aminath Rasheedha. Based on a novel published by Waheed titled Balgish, he played the role of a gangster. Upon release, the film received mixed to negative reviews from critics; Ali Naafiz from Haveeru Daily classified the film as the "worst Maldivian film released so far" during the year, criticizing the performance of lead. However, other critics found the performance of Azmeel to be "good for a starter". His debut performance garnered him a nomination for Best Actor at the 6th Gaumee Film Awards while winning the Best Male Debut award at the Enchanteur Maldives Film Awards 2012.

The following year, Azmeel appeared in Aishath Ali Manik's romantic horror film Kuhveriakee Kaakuhey? (2011) opposite Aishath Rishmy. Inspired by the horror romantic thriller Bollywood film Darling (2007), pre-production of the film was started in 2007 and shot in Sri Lanka. It revolves around a man who cheats on his wife with his secretary, and how his life slides to a haunting shift when he accidentally kills his mistress. The film and his performance received negative reviews from critics. "Azmeel does not seem to be in his form this time; He is weak in delivering sequences with different emotions. He tries hard in the emotional grief scenes, but fails to impress the audience". The film did little business at boxoffice and was declared a flop. His next release was a family drama Hiyy Yaara Dheefa (2011), written and directed by him, starred alongside Aishath Rishmy, Niuma Mohamed, Ali Seezan and Aminath Rasheedha. The film received negative reviews from critics pointing similarities between Bollywood comedy-drama film Ishq (1997) and Kundan Shah's family drama Dil Hai Tumhaara (2002). The film revolves around four young people from different social classes fall in love with partners who do not meet with their parents' approval. The film did not succeed financially, and his work as a writer, actor and director was disapproved by critics.

In 2015, Azmeel collaborated with Fathimath Nahula for two television drama series. In the first release, a 15-episodes romantic series Vakivumuge Kurin, Azmeel portrayed a betrayal husband having an extra-marital affair. This was followed by her 13 episodes television drama series, Umurah Salaan (2015) which centers on a squabble family which is separated due to the greed for money and misunderstandings. The series which stars Mohamed Faisal, Aminath Rishfa, Azmeel and Mariyam Azza in lead roles, he portrays the character Fayaz, a carefree young man and a womanizer.

In 2016, Azmeel appeared in Hussain Munawwar's Neyngi Yaaru Vakivee alongside Aminath Rishfa. Critics gave the film negative reviews and considered Azmeel's performance as Kamal, to be "boring" while criticising the character development. Despite the negative reviews, the film did average business at the end of its run. His next release of the year was Ali Seezan-directed romantic film Vafaatheri Kehiveriya alongside Maleeha Waheed. The film received a mixed to negative reception from critics. Yoosuf Shafeeu-directed Baiveriyaa (2016), a comedy film featuring an ensemble cast was his second release of the year. The film revolves around an aspiring actress who flees from her family to pursue a career in the industry and the suspicions and confusions that arise. Upon release the film was positively received by critics. Nazim Hassan of Avas applauded the comic timing of the characters and mentioned that Azmeel showed "improvements from his earlier work". The film emerged as one of the highest grossing Maldivian films of the year.

In 2018, Azmeel appeared in Mariyam Moosa's directorial debut romantic film Thiya Loaibaa Dhurah. The entire film was shot in Sri Lanka. It was moderately received by critics; Aminath Lubaa reviewing from Sun praised the music and story of the film though she opined the performance from the actors including Azmeel, could have been better. In May 2018, it was premiered in Sri Lanka, and played two housefull shows at Mount Lavinia Cinema.

Azmeel's first release of 2019 was the Moomin Fuad-directed psychological horror thriller Nivairoalhi (2019) which marks Niuma Mohamed's last onscreen film. Revolving around a patient with depression, he played a small role in the film. Starring opposite Mohamed, Yoosuf Shafeeu and Ahmed Asim, the film received majorly positive reviews from critics; Aishath Maaha of Dho? favored the performance of the lead actors and mentioned the "neat arrangement" of its screenplay though pointed out its "weak ending" to be unsatisfactory while his performance was noted to be a "one-scene impression".

== Personal life ==
In May 2007, Azmeel married one of his co-stars Aishath Rishmy; with whom he shared screen space in many songs. In December 2008 he welcomed his son Ismail Aziel Azumeel. In 2013 Azmeel divorced Rishmy.

== Media image ==
In 2011, Azmeel was voted in the top three as the "Most Entertaining Actor" in the SunFM Awards 2010, an award night ceremony initiated by Sun Media Group to honour the most recognized personalities in different fields, during the previous year.

== Controversy ==
On 10 January 2024, Azmeel was arrested for a drug related offence. However, since he has no prior records of criminal activity and is not deemed to be a danger to society, the Criminal court decided to release him under conditions.

== Filmography ==
=== Feature film ===
Year	Title	Role	Notes	Ref(s)
1999	Kaiveneege Furathama Rey	Ali Rasheedh	Special appearance	
2004	Hama Himeyn	Ibrahim	Special appearance	
2004	Edhathuru	Anas	Special appearance	
2009	Baaraige Fas	Adheel		
2010	Fanaa	Aadhan "Aadey"	Nominated—Gaumee Film Award for Best Actor; Maldives Film Award for Best Male Debut	
2011	Kuhveriakee Kaakuhey?	Azeen		
2011	Hiyy Yaara Dheefa	Anil	Also the director	
2016	Neyngi Yaaru Vakivee	Kamal		
2016	Vafaatheri Kehiveriya	Lahchey		
2016	Baiveriyaa	Yanish		
2017	Neydhen Vakivaakah	Nadheem	Special appearance	
2018	Thiya Loaibaa Dhurah	Amir		
2019	Nivairoalhi	Hassan		

=== Television ===
Year	Title	Role	Notes	Ref(s)
2003	Ujaalaa Raasthaa	Adheel	Main role; 8 episodes	
2004	Vaisoori	Nashid	In the segment "An'dhiri Hayaaiy"	
2004	Kamana Vareh Neiy	Himself	Guest role; "Episode 4"	
2005–2006	Vairoalhi Ahves Sirrun	Nahid	Main role; 52 episodes	
2006–2007	Vaguthu Faaithu Nuvanees	Firaz	Recurring role; 50 episodes	
2009	Mihithah Loabi Dheyshey	Nawaal	Also the writer and editor Main role; 15 episodes	
2015	Vakivumuge Kurin	Maaz	Main role; 15 episodes	
2015–2016	Umurah Salaan	Fayaz	Main role; 13 episodes	
2019	Shhh	Sunil	5 episodes	
2020	Huvaa	Mausoom	Main role	
2020	Ehenas	Shaira's doctor	Guest role; Episode: "Aftermath"	
2021	Huvaa Kohfa Bunan	Assad	Main role	
2021	Avahteriya	Jabir	Main role; 9 episodes	
2022	Biruveri Vaahaka	Soba	Main role; Episode: "Jaadhoogar"	
2022	Rimsha	Ahmed Fiyaz	Main role; 13 episodes	
2023–2024	Yaaraa	Shinaan Rasheed	Main role; 47 episodes	
2025	Imthihaan	Mirufaan	Main role	

=== Short film ===
Year	Title	Role	Notes	Ref(s)
2006	Kudafoolhuge Vasvaas	Himself	Special appearance	
2007	Umurahvess Inthizaaru Kuraanan	Rishwan	Also the co-director and co-producer	
2009	Haadhisaa		Also the director	
2012	Haadhisaa 2		Also the director	
2020	KKB: Kuda Kuda Baaru	Shiraz	Also the director	

== Accolades ==
Year	Award	Category	Nominated work	Result	Ref(s)
2011	2nd SunFM Awards	Most Entertaining Actor		Nominated	
2012	2nd Maldives Film Awards	Best Male Debut	Fanaa	Won	
2015	6th Gaumee Film Awards	Best Actor	Fanaa	Nominated	
