= Vakinuvaan Bunefaa Vaudheh Nuvanhey? =

Maldivian television series

- Written by: Mohamed Shareef; Ilyas Faruhad
- Screenplay by: Mohamed Shareef; Hassan Haleem
- Directed by: Hassan Haleem
- Country of origin: Maldives
- Original language: Divehi
- No. of seasons: 1
- No. of episodes: 13

Production
- Producer: Ilyas Faruhad
- Cinematography: Hassan Haleem
- Editor: Muaviyath Anwar
- Production companies: MY Studio; IF Productions

Original release
- Release: July 1 – September 23, 2009

Vakinuvaan Bunefaa Vaudheh Nuvanhey? is a 2009 Maldivian romantic television drama series directed by Hassan Haleem. Produced by Ilyas Faruhad, it stars Ahmed Latheef, Fathimath Azifa, Ibrahim Jihad, Aminath Ameela and Mariyam Shahuza in main roles. The series follows the feud of a family over two outsiders.

== Cast ==
=== Main ===
- Ahmed Latheef as Moosa
- Fathimath Azifa as Reema
- Ibrahim Jihad as Nabeel
- Aminath Ameela as Fazna
- Mariyam Shahuza as Shifaza
- Haseena Mohamed as Faheema

=== Recurring ===
- Shaheem as Hassandhee; Reema's father
- Yooshau Jameel as Ashraf; Reema's husband

== Episodes ==
No.	Title	Directed by
1	"Episode 1"	Hassan Haleem
Moosa (Ahmed Latheef), a close friend of Nabeel visits his island, who is fantasized by almost every woman in the island including Shifaza (Mariyam Shahuza) and a college student residing at her place, Reema (Fathimath Azifa). Even though, Fazna, the younger sister of Shifaza, has a crush on Nabeel, he is more attracted towards her sister. Fazna catches Reema talking privately to Reema which irritates Fazna.
2	"Episode 2"	Hassan Haleem
Moosa proposes to Fazna and is overwhelmed due to her acceptance. Fazna accuses Reema is having an affair with Moosa which makes Moosa suspects of their relationship.
3	"Episode 3"	Hassan Haleem
Since Reema has to accompany Shifaza every time she plans a date with Moosa, he is left with no choice but to avoid Reema and keeps his distance from Nabeel until he clears his suspicions. Fazna is more furious when she finds out Nadheem is attracted to Shifaza.
4	"Episode 4"	Hassan Haleem
Nadheem catches Moosa and Shifaza having fun at the beach, much to his discomfort, which creates tension among the two friends. Shifaza and Fazna's mother, Faheema, figures out Reema's affair and forbids her from leaving the house at night.
5	"Episode 5"	Hassan Haleem
Shifaza is given a false hope that Moosa intends to marry her, which Faheema also approves. As the dispute between Moosa and Nabeel grows, the former moves out from the house.
6	"Episode 6"	Hassan Haleem
All the misunderstanding are cleared when Shifaza catches Fazna meeting Moosa late night. Shifaza strongly determines to breakup the couple at any cost. Nadheem ultimately proposes to Shifaza who faces an outright rejection.
7	"Episode 7"	Hassan Haleem
Faheema deceives Reema by planting false accusation on Moosa and Reema, which forces her to move back to her island for sometimes. Faheema further complicates the situation by defaming her that she has eloped with someone from her island to marry him, which breaks Moosa.
8	"Episode 8"	Hassan Haleem
Shifaza acts rude to Nadheem, who slowly becomes affectionate towards Fazna. Moosa reunites with Nadheem. Shifaza, assisted by her mother, sedates Moosa and spend the night with him.
9	"Episode 9"	Hassan Haleem
Reema returns to the island, the following morning, only to find Moosa and Shifaza sleeping on the same bed. Fazna's eavesdrops the conversation between Faheema and Shifaza, who intends to expose their evil plan to Reema, only to realize she has moved on and married to a resort manager, Ashraf (Yooshau Jameel).
10	"Episode 10"	Hassan Haleem
Reema starts ignoring Moosa and firmly states she has moved on, which Nabeel refuse to believe. Shifaza takes the opportunity to manipulate Moosa into starting a relationship with her. Ashraf is revealed to be a short-tempered and abusive husband.
11	"Episode 11"	Hassan Haleem
Fazna and Nabeel gets married and receive a lukewarm response from Fazna's family. Reema is revealed to be pregnant to her first child, while Moosa is still depressed of losing her. Shifaza confesses her love to Moosa who instead prefers to wait for Reema. Ashraf's true colors are exposed. He begins an extramarital affair with Shifaza, as cleverly planned by her.
12	"Episode 12"	Hassan Haleem
Ashraf makes the Reema's life a living hell. As soon as his work is completed, Moosa departs to Male'. Despite Faheema's disapproval, Shifaza determines to break Reema's marriage and snatch Ashraf from her life.
13	"Episode 13"	Hassan Haleem
Nabeel and Fazna decide to help Reema at any cost. As dictated by Shifaza, Ashraf divorces her. Reema gives birth to a twins. Shifaza and Ashraf's affair gets exposed where the former is kept under house arrest and the latter is sentenced to banishment. Sensing Reema is in danger, Moosa moves back to the island and they reunite.

== Soundtrack ==
Track listing
No.	Title	Singer(s)	Length
1.	"Vakinuvaan Bunefaa Vaudheh Nuvanhey?"	Ibrahim Zaid Ali, Moonisa Khaleel

== Release and reception ==
The first episode of the series was aired on 1 July 209 on the occasion of first anniversary of DhiTV. The series mainly received mixed to negative reviews from critics, for its dragged and melodramatic screenplay and weak acting.
