= Umurah Salaam (TV series) =

- Genre: Romantic drama
- Written by: Fathimath Nahula
- Screenplay by: Fathimath Nahula
- Directed by: Fathimath Nahula; Mohamed Faisal
- Starring: Mohamed Faisal; Aminath Rishfa; Mariyam Azza; Ahmed Azmeel; Mariyam Haleem; Fathimath Mufliha
- No. of seasons: 1
- No. of episodes: 13

Production
- Producer: Crystal Entertainment
- Cinematography: Hassan Haleem
- Running time: 23–27 minutes

Original release
- Release: 2015 – 2016

Umurah Salaam is a Maldivian romantic drama television series developed for Television Maldives by Fathimath Nahula and Mohamed Faisal. The series stars Mohamed Faisal, Aminath Rishfa and Mariyam Azza in pivotal roles.

== Premise ==
Ashraf (Mohamed Faisal), an honest businessman, plans to marry Shazly (Mariyam Azza), an orphan, despite his wicked half-sister, Nashidha (Fathimath Mufliha) and equally villainous, step-mother's (Mariyam Haleem) disapproval. Fayaz (Ahmed Azmeel), a carefree young man, married to an elder woman, Nashidha, is involved in an extra-marital affair with a friend of Shazly, Fareesha (Sujeetha Abdulla). Fayaz and Fareesha marry on the same night of Ashraf and Shazly's wedding. The following day Ashraf's father, Saud (Roanu Hassan Manik) is found to be dead lying on bed. Although the doctors mention the reason for death as a heart attack, both Ashraf and Fayaz suspect he might have been murdered on the night of their weddings. Meanwhile, Nashidha's younger brother, Fazil (Ahmed Aman) confesses his love for the servant working in their house, an orphan, Maasha (Mariyam Majudha) which disgusts both Nashidha and her mother.

Shazly gets pregnant but suffers a miscarriage which rendered her infertile. Badly wanting a child, Ashraf marries Reesha. Shazly doesn't know about Ashraf's remarriage but Reesha knows Ashraf is already married. When Reesha gets pregnant Ashraf tries to spend more time with her. On the other hand, Fareesha also gets pregnant. Few months later, Reesha comes to Ashraf's home island and lives with Shazly. This makes things complicated for Ashraf. After delivery, Reesha leaves her baby at Ashraf's room and leaves forever. Shazly sees Reesha's child's birth certificate and finds out that Ashraf is the father on the child. After confronting Ashraf about marrying Reesha, Shazly leaves him and move on with her life.

== Cast and characters ==
=== Main ===
- Mohamed Faisal as Ashraf
- Aminath Rishfa as Reesha
- Mariyam Azza as Shazly
- Ahmed Azmeel as Fayaz
- Mariyam Haleem as Nashidha's mother
- Fathimath Mufliha as Nashidha

=== Recurring ===
- Roanu Hassan Manik as Saud; Ashraf's father (3 episodes)
- Mariyam Majudha as Maasha
- Ahmed Aman as Fazil
- Sujeetha Abdulla as Fareesha
- Abdulla Mahir as Shahudhee

== Soundtrack ==
Track listing
No.	Title	Lyrics	Singer(s)	Length
1.	"Dhulakun Huvaa Mikuranee"	Yoosuf Mohamed Fulhu	Andhala Haleem	4:26
