= Neyngi Yaaru Vakivee =

- Official film poster
- Directed by: Hussain Munawwar
- Screenplay by: Ibrahim Nifar
- Starring: Aminath Rishfa; Ahmed Azmeel; Maleeha Waheed; Ismail Jumaih; Ahmed Nimal
- Cinematography: Hussain Munawwar
- Edited by: Ahmed Nimal
- Music by: Hassan Jalaal
- Production company: Kid Production
- Release date: March 4, 2016
- Country: Maldives
- Language: Dhivehi

Neyngi Yaaru Vakivee is a 2016 Maldivian romantic film directed by Hussain Munawwar. Produced under the banner Kid Production, the film stars Aminath Rishfa and Ahmed Azmeel in pivotal roles. The film also stars Ahmed Nimal, Ismail Jumaih and Maleeha Waheed in supporting roles. The film was shot at different locations in Sri Lanka.

== Cast ==
- Ahmed Azmeel as Kamal
- Aminath Rishfa as Reema
- Ismail Jumaih as Sham
- Maleeha Waheed as Laila
- Ahmed Nimal as Abdul Zaki

== Soundtrack ==
The musical score was composed by Hassan Jalaal.

No.	Title	Singer(s)	Length
1.	"Beywafaa"	Ibrahim Mamdhooh	1:17
2.	"Haadha Loabinney"	Hassan Jalaal	3:43
3.	"Heeveyey Annahen"	Ahmed Shabeen	3:36
4.	"Karunain Loa Foavey"	Hassan Jalaal	5:58
Total length:			14:38

== Release and reception ==
Neyngi Yaaru Vakivee was released on 4 March 2016 and opened to a positive response at the box office and did average business at the end of its run.

The film received a mixed to negative response from critics. Ahmed Nadheem from Avas criticised the overall film, labeling it "boring" and mentioned the screenplay by Ibrahim Nifar as the weakest factor in the film. He noted that there is no aspect in the film that the audience would find exciting. Ahmed Jaishan of Vaguthu gave the film 3.5 out of 5 stars, and praised Jumaih's acting along with Rishfa's. However he criticised the acting of Maleeha Waheedh, further mentioning the weak screenplay lacked fine character development.

== Accolades ==
Award	Category	Recipient(s) and nominee(s)	Result	Ref(s)
8th Gaumee Film Awards	Best Male Debut	Ismail Jumaih	Nominated	
8th Gaumee Film Awards	Best Female Debut	Maleeha Waheed	Nominated	
