= Shhh (web series) =

- Genre: Horror
- Created by: Amjad Ibrahim
- Written by: Amjad Ibrahim
- Screenplay by: Amjad Ibrahim
- Directed by: Amjad Ibrahim
- Starring: Ahmed Azmeel; Sheela Najeeb; Zeenath Abbas; Ahmed Shaaz; Irufana Ibrahim; Mariyam Haleem

Production
- Producers: Hussain Munawwar; Abdulla Hafiz; Mohamed Mirusam
- Cinematography: Mohamed Aiman
- Editor: Rafhan Shareef
- Running time: 19 minutes

Original release
- Network: Baiskoafu
- Release: 10 May – 11 June 2019

Shhh is a Maldivian horror web television series developed for Baiskoafu by Amjad Ibrahim. It revolves around the haunting of a newly married couple. The series is produced by Hussain Munawwar, Abdulla Hafiz and Mohamed Mirusam.

The series stars Ahmed Azmeel, Sheela Najeeb, Zeenath Abbas, Ahmed Shaaz, Irufana Ibrahim and Mariyam Haleem pivotal roles. The first episode of the series was released on Baiskoafu on 10 May 2019.

== Cast and characters ==
- Ahmed Azmeel as Sunil (5 episodes)
- Sheela Najeeb as Ram (2 episodes)
- Zeenath Abbas as Reesha (2 episodes)
- Ahmed Shaaz as Alifulhube (5 episodes)
- Irufana Ibrahim as Lucian (1 episode)
- Mariyam Haleem as Lucian's mother (2 episodes)
- Ali Nadheeh as Sunil's friend (1 episode)

== Episodes ==
No. in season	Title	Directed by	Original release date
1	"Episode 01"	Amjad Ibrahim	May 10, 2019
Reesha (Zeenath Abbas), after marrying Sunil (Ahmed Azmeel) temporarily moves to his house for a week and is terrified upon meeting the house owner, Alifulhube (Ahmed Shaaz) who sets strange rules to be followed by tenants; forbidding them from leaving and entering their room during the night time. Reesha begs Sunil to search for another place to stay though he tries to convince Reesha on staying. The first night, Reesha wakes up to a horrifying growling sound.
2	"Episode 02"	Amjad Ibrahim	May 17, 2019
Reesha is petrified on seeing Alifulhube's face and helplessly stays the whole night awake. The next morning Sunil and Alifulhube have a conversation which inclines their past relationship and involvement. It is later revealed that Reesha and Sunil are not yet married but in a relationship. Meanwhile, Reesha discovers a closet full of wardrobes and a mobile phone. Alifulhube insists the couple on taking breakfast at home. While Reesha is in the kitchen she is stabbed to death by Sunil.
3	"Episode 03"	Amjad Ibrahim	May 24, 2019
Reesha is being fed to an "undefined animal" which makes the horrifying growling sound when hungry. Sunil preys another woman, Lucian (Irufana Ibrahim) and brings her into the house while introducing Alifulhube as his uncle. Lucian plans her marriage with Sunil which is to be held in the following week. While she is making coffee in the kitchen, Sunil attacks her on the head with a hammer and she dies.
4	"Episode 04"	Amjad Ibrahim	May 31, 2019
Lucian's belongings are incinerated and Sunil informs Lucian's mother that they are departing to abroad in a while. Meanwhile Ram (Sheela Najeeb) moves into Sunil's house and experiences weird incidents.
5	"Episode 05"	Amjad Ibrahim	June 11, 2019
Ram is terrified on discovering a knife in the bathroom. Alibe warns Sunil to get rid of Ram as soon as possible. Ram suspects that Sunil and Alibe are hiding something from her. The following night, when both Sunil and Alibe are sleeping, Ram sneaks into the room where the growling sound was coming from.

== Development ==
In April 2019, it was announced that Baiskoafu has collaborated with Amjad Ibrahim for a horror web series starring Sheela Najeeb, Ahmed Azmeel, Zeenath Abbas and Irufana Ibrahim. Entire series was filmed in Hulhumale. In an interview, talking about his first web series, Amjad Ibrahim stated; "considering the advancement in technology, this series is created for the digital audience and we have created never-seen-before horror scenes in this series thanks the young intellect in our crew".

== Release ==
The first episode among the five episodes from the first season was released on 10 May 2019, on the occasion of 1440 Ramadan. Director Amjad Ibrahim revealed his intention of renewing the series for a second season based on its popularity. A new episode is scheduled to release on Friday 21:00 of every week.
