= Fandu (web series) =

Maldivian web series

- Written by: Mohamed Shifuan; Ibrahim Yafiu
- Directed by: Mohamed Shifuan
- Music by: Ibrahim Yafiu
- Country of origin: Maldives
- Original language: Divehi
- No. of seasons: 1
- No. of episodes: 13

Production
- Executive producers: Mohamed Mirusan; Abdulla Hafiz
- Cinematography: Samaah Ibrahim; Shinaah Ibrahim
- Editors: Shinaah Ibrahim; Mohamed Shifuan; Samaah Ibrahim
- Production company: Lights Out Production

Original release
- Release: March 25 – June 15, 2023

Fandu is a Maldivian famil drama web series co-written and directed by Mohamed Shifuan. It stars Aminath Silna, Hussain Nazim, Ahmed Ifnaz Firag and Thaathi Adam in main roles while Sheela Najeeb and Mohamed Manik play supporting characters in the series. The pilot episode of the series was released on 25 March 2023.

In a tale of complex relationships, the series delves into the intertwined lives of Dheema, Shabana, and Hussain, exploring the devastating effects of abuse, guilt, and strained dynamics as they navigate a path filled with shattered trust, emotional turmoil, and attempts at redemption.

== Cast and characters ==
=== Main ===
- Aminath Silna as Dheema
- Ahmed Ifnaz Firag as Hussain
- Thaathi Adam as Shabana

=== Recurring ===
- Sheela Najeeb as Saleema
- Mohamed Manik as Nasir
- Hussain Nazim as Hassan

=== Guest ===
- Ravee Farooq as Irfan; Hussain's colleague (Episode 11)

== Episodes ==
No.	Title	Directed by	Original release date
1	"Extricate"	Mohamed Shifuan	March 25, 2023
Nasir (Mohamed Manik) is deeply concerned about his teenage stepdaughter, Dheema (Aminath Silna), who is viewed as a burden by those around her. Disturbed by the situation, Nasir's wife, Saleema (Sheela Najeeb) reaches out to her ex-husband, Hassan (Hussain Nazim) seeking his assistance in taking their daughter to Male' for her well-being. A week later, Saleema bids an emotional farewell to her daughter. Hassan's younger brother, Hussain (Ahmed Ifnaz Firag), a short-tempered man, agrees to provide shelter for Dheema in his own home.
2	"Guardian"	Mohamed Shifuan	March 30, 2023
Hussain takes a short leave from work and embarks on a sightseeing trip with Dheema and his wife, Shabana. During their time together, Hussain advises Dheema to enroll in a course before pursuing job opportunities. Meanwhile, Shabana gradually teaches Dheema various household chores, imparting valuable skills along the way. As Hussain's attention increasingly focuses on Dheema, Shabana's behavior towards her takes a turn for the worse, displaying rudeness and hostility.
3	"Contemporary"	Mohamed Shifuan	April 6, 2023
Dheema writes a heartfelt note in her diary, reminiscing about the joyful moments she shared with her father and uncle, affectionately referring to Shabana as her best friend. Meanwhile, Hassan accepts a job offer as a supervisor at a nearby resort, with a duration of six months. Dheema becomes more actively involved in assisting Shabana with household chores.
4	"Treachery"	Mohamed Shifuan	April 13, 2023
Various circumstances arise, causing growing discomfort between Dheema and Shabana. Dheema's thoughtless actions result in Hussain repeatedly subjecting Shabana to abuse, further deteriorating her relationship with Dheema. During a particular incident, tensions escalate as Shabana physically lashes out at Dheema when the latter accidentally breaks Hussain's mobile phone. Despite Dheema being responsible for the mishap, Hussain unjustly places the entire blame on Shabana, intensifying the strained dynamic between them.
5	"Nostalgia"	Mohamed Shifuan	April 20, 2023
Overwhelmed with guilt, Shabana finds herself in a state of uncertainty, unsure of how to process her own actions. Meanwhile, Dheema reflects on her initial experiences in the new house, reminiscing about the bond she formed with Shabana and contemplating the unfortunate turn of events that led to their fractured relationship.
6	"Sincere"	Mohamed Shifuan	April 27, 2023
Despite Dheema's persistent efforts to win Shabana's approval, she consistently falls short, only serving to further emotionally and verbally abuse Shabana while resorting to physical harm.
7	"Torture"	Mohamed Shifuan	May 4, 2023
Devastated and seeking reconciliation, Dheema emotionally assures Hussain of her determination to improve, unknowingly sending a powerful message to those around her. As Hussain departs on a two-week office trip, Shabana manipulates the situation, giving the impression that she is assisting Dheema while exploiting her by assigning all the household chores.
8	"III"	Mohamed Shifuan	May 11, 2023
After Shabana kicks Dheema in her belly, inflicting significant pain and discomfort, she realizes the gravity of her actions and strives to make amends. Seeking redemption, Shabana takes the initiative to prepare food for Dheema and offers her emotional support during this difficult time.
9	"Blunt"	Mohamed Shifuan	May 18, 2023
Despite Shabana's continued care for Dheema, her situation remains unchanged. As the weight of her actions weighs heavily on her conscience, Shabana experiences recurring nightmares, envisioning the potential consequences of her behavior. Hussain comes back from the trip.
10	"Delusion"	Mohamed Shifuan	May 25, 2023
The pain Dheema experiences is attributed to her menstrual cycle. While Hussain suggests taking her to the hospital for medical assistance, Shabana argues against it, considering period cramps as a normal occurrence. Shabana, feeling threatened by the possibility of Dheema revealing the truth, grapples with the fear of the secret being exposed.
11	"Concealed"	Mohamed Shifuan	June 1, 2023
Dheema finally musters the courage to reveal the truth to Hussain. Overwhelmed with anger and disbelief, Hussain reacts violently, attacking Shabana. In her defense, Shabana blames Hussain, asserting that the pain Dheema endured was merely transferred as Hussain has been abusing her all along. Hussain, needing time to process the harsh reality Shabana presented, eventually returns home with an apology and a heartfelt promise never to hurt her again. In response, Shabana reciprocates her forgiveness to Dheema for her actions.
12	"Cessation"	Mohamed Shifuan	June 8, 2023
The household seemed to settle, but clarity was short-lived when Shabana received a call from a relative regarding a rumor of Hussain having an affair during his China trip with a girl named Nathasha. When Shabana confronted Hussain about this unsettling rumor, he reacted with violence once more, deepening the tensions in their relationship.
13	"Demise"	Mohamed Shifuan	June 15, 2023
In a tragic repetition of events, Shabana channels her anger and frustration onto Dheema, this time with even greater violence. Hussain returns home, visibly more relaxed, and begins to explain the true nature of his connection with Nathasha. However, as he talks, a horrifying realization dawns upon him. During this period, Dheema's condition deteriorates, and she is bleeding profusely from the injuries inflicted upon her, inching closer to the brink of death.

== Release and reception ==
The first episode of the series was released on 25 March 2023 through Baiskoafu. Upon release, the series received generally positive reviews from critics, where the technical aspects of the film was applauded along with the performance of lead actors including Ahmed Ifnaz Firag and Thaathi Adam.
