= Irufana Ibrahim =

Maldivian film actress

- Occupation: Actress
- Years active: 2017–present
- Spouse: Shifaz Adil

Irufana Ibrahim is a Maldivian film actress.

== Career ==
Ibrahim made her acting debut in a recurring role in the first Maldivian web-series, a romantic drama by Fathimath Nahula, Huvaa which initiated streaming in November 2018. The series consisting of sixty episodes and streamed through the digital platform Baiskoafu, centers around a happy and radiant family who then experience despair and conflict after a tragic incident that led to an unaccountable loss. The series and Ibrahim's performance as the fiancé of a gang-member being arrested for murder were positively received. After the success of Huvaa, Irufana starred in another web-series; Amjad Ibrahim-directed horror television series Shhh which consists of five episodes. In the series, Ibrahim played the role of Lucian, a victim of homicide. This was followed by Yoosuf Shafeeu's horror comedy film 40+ (2019), a sequel to 2017 released comedy film Naughty 40, which was well received both critically and commercially.

In 2023, Ibrahim played the supporting role of a consideratee friend in Ali Seezan's erotic thriller Loabi Vevijje, which follows a married man who becomes infatuated with a woman after a one-night stand. The film was announced in 2019, but halted due to COVID-19 pandemic, opened to generally positive reviews from critics, specifically for its cinematography.

== Filmography ==
=== Feature film ===
Year	Title	Role	Notes	Ref(s)
2019	40+	Shamra		
2019	Kaaku?	Soby		
2022	Hehes	Niufa		
2023	Loabi Vevijje	Fazee		

=== Television ===
Year	Title	Role	Notes	Ref(s)
2019–2020	Huvaa	Saha	Main role	
2019	Gellunu Furaana	Haifa	Main role; 4 episodes	
2019	Shhh	Lucian	"Episode 3"	
2019	Yes Sir	Aishath Athoofa Musthafa	Main role; 10 episodes	
2021	Huvaa Kohfa Bunan	Airin	Recurring role	
2023	Yaaraa	Zein's second wife	Guest role; "Episode 1"	
