= Mount Lavinia Hotel =

Hotel in Sri Lanka

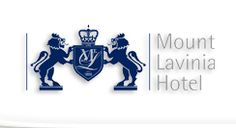
- The Logo of Mount Lavinia Hotel
- Interactive map of the Mount Lavinia Hotel area

General information
- Location: 100 Hotel Road, Mount Lavinia
- Coordinates: 6.8333°N 79.8619°E
- Opening: 1877
- Operator: Mount Lavinia Hotel Group

Technical details
- Floor count: 2

Other information
- Number of rooms: 275
- Number of suites: 11
- Number of restaurants: 3

Website
- http://www.mountlaviniahotel.com

The Mount Lavinia Hotel is a 275-room hotel, situated at 100 Hotel Road in Mount Lavinia, Sri Lanka. Originally constructed as the governor's residence in 1806, it has been continuously operating as a hotel since 1947, and is recognised as one of the oldest and most famous in the country.

== History ==
The governor's palace around 1900

In 1805 Sir Thomas Maitland was appointed as the second governor of British Ceylon. He had acquired land at "Galkissa" (Mount Lavinia) and decided in 1806 to construct a personal residence there.

Legend has it that at a welcoming party held in his honour upon his arrival in the island he saw Lovina Aponsuwa, a local mestizo dancer, whose father was the headman of the dancing troupe. Maitland fell in love with Aponsuwa, who had been born to Portuguese and Sinhalese parents. During construction, the governor arranged to build a secret tunnel between Aponsuwa's nearby house and his wine cellar, so that the lovers could meet in secret.

Sir James Mackintosh, a friend of the governor, wrote in 1810 that it was "a bungalow of one storey, rustic on the outside, but handsomely laid out, and furnished beautifully".

Sir Thomas Maitland was recalled from Ceylon in 1811 and appointed the governor of Malta, where he died a bachelor.

The statue of 'Lady' Lavinia, as the girl later became known, can be found in the middle of a water fountain at the entrance of the hotel.

The next governor, Sir Robert Brownrigg recommended a further purchase of the surrounding land, 35 acres (14 ha) from 14 landowners for 18,000 Rix dollars.

Sir Edward Barnes undertook significant extensions and improvements to the building during his second term as governor. "Mount Lavinia was to be his ultimate creation; a magnificent residence fit for the Grand Master, such as Versailles was to Louis XIV".

British military engineers redesigned the house on the lines of an Italian villa. Captain Edward Sanderson of the Royal Engineers, was the designer and master builder under Barnes’ watchful eye. The building was modelled on the ‘Banqueting House’ in Whitehall, a creation of architect Inigo Jones, also known as the ‘English Palace’. The Banqueting House was refurbished by architect Sir John Soane. "Not only does the date of the refacing of the Banqueting House coincide perfectly with the building of Mount Lavinia but a marked similarity in style is also apparent between the two buildings. Inigo Jones had used the Ionic and Corinthian orders, the height of urban sophistication. At Mount Lavinia, which offered a country setting, Sanderson used the simpler Doric order and superimposed the Ionic. This pattern had been used by Palladio in building his Palazzo Chiericati in Vicenza, Italy."

The works were completed in 1830 however in 1831 Barnes was appointed as Commander in-Chief in India. His successor Sir Robert Wilmot-Horton chose not to reside at Mount Lavinia and it was therefore recommended that the building be disposed of. In 1842 the British government sold the building at auction, with Rev. Dr. John MacVicar, the Colonial Chaplain purchasing it. The mansion was subsequently converted into an asylum for the insane.

In 1877 the government constructed a railway line along the coast. This second railway line in Ceylon passed in front of Mount Lavinia, connecting the house directly to the harbor at Colombo. Seeing the potential for profit, developers bought the dilapidated mansion and turned it into an opulent hotel, The Mount Lavinia Grand Hotel. Later two additional wings were added to the building.

In 1927 the hotel was purchased by Arthur Ephraums, the owner of the Globe, Bristol and Whitehorse hotels in Colombo, and was managed by Cargills & Co. The following year he sold it to C.H.Z. Fernando.

In 1939 following the commencement of World War II Ceylon, the centre of the British Empire's rubber supply, quickly became a priority for the Allies and a target for the Axis forces. The Mount Lavinia Hotel was commandeered by the British Army as a supply base and housed the No 35 British General Hospital from 1942 to 1946.

The hotel was sold in 1944 to Ceylon Hotels Corporation Ltd and later in 1948, the year in which Ceylon achieved Independence; the hotel was sold to H. J. Pilbrow and then sold again in 1955 to P. A. Ediriweera.

In 1957 a number of scenes in the film, The Bridge on the River Kwai, were filmed at the hotel.

In the 1970s, Hyatt assumed operation of the hotel and it became the Mount Lavinia Hyatt for a number of years.

In 1975 U. K. Edmund purchased the hotel becoming the director and chairman of the hotel until his death in 1985, when the property then passed to his son, Sanath Ukwatte, who is the present chairman of the hotel group.

In January 2011 four blue plaques were installed at the hotel's entrance, commemorating Sir Thomas Maitland, Sir Robert Brownrigg, Sir Edward Paget and Sir Edward Barnes, all of whom resided in the building when it was the governor's residence.

== Celebrity guests ==
Guests who have stayed at the hotel include King Leopold of Belgium, cosmonaut Yuri Gagarin, writer Somerset Maugham, English film director David Lean, and actors Vivien Leigh, Kirk Douglas and Gregory Peck.

== See also ==
- Dehiwala-Mount Lavinia

== Literature ==
- Maureen Seneviratne (1995). The Story of Mount Lavinia Hotel. McCallum Publishers.
- William Warren, Jill Gocher (2007). Asia's legendary hotels: the romance of travel. Singapore: Periplus Editions. ISBN 978-0-7946-0174-4.
