= Tribes of Jharkhand =

Scheduled tribes in Jharkhand, India

The tribes of Jharkhand consist of 32 scheduled tribes inhabiting the Jharkhand state in India. As of 2011 census, thy account for 26.21 percent (8 million) of the state's total population. They primarily concentrated in South Chotanagpur, Kolhan and Santal parganas division.

== History ==
In 1872 only 18 tribes were counted among the scheduled tribes from which Banjara, Bhatudi, Chik Baraik, and Mahli were marked as semi-Hindu aboriginal and Kora as proletariat Hindu. In the 1931 census, including the above four semi-Hindu aboriginal and Kora, a proletariat Hindu, the number was raised to 26 from 18. They were Birajia, Godait, Karmali and Paharia, but Kisan was excluded from the list. In the 1941 census, Baga, Bedia and Lohra were included again taking Kisan in the annexure and the number came to 30 which prevailed till June 2003. Kanwar and Kol were added on 8 June 2003 in the annexure and the number of Schedule Tribes came to 32.

== Classification ==
The tribes in Jharkhand were originally classified based on their cultural types by the Indian anthropologist, Lalita Prasad Vidyarthi. His classification was as follows:

- Hunter-gatherer type — Birhor, Korwa, Hill Kharia
- Shifting agriculture — Sauria Paharia, Mal Paharia
- Simple artisans — Mahli, Lohra, Karmali, Chik Baraik
- Settled agriculturists — Bhumij, Ho, Oraon, Munda, Santhal, etc.

== List of Scheduled Tribes ==
List of Scheduled Tribes.

1. Asur
2. Baiga
3. Banjara
4. Bathudi
5. Bedia
6. Bhumij
7. Binjhia
8. Birhor
9. Birjia
10. Chero
11. Chik Baraik
12. Gond
13. Gorait
14. Ho
15. Kanwar
16. Karmali
17. Kharia
18. Kharwar
19. Khond
20. Kisan
21. Kora
22. Kol
23. Korwa
24. Lohra
25. Mahli
26. Mal Pahariya
27. Munda
28. Oraon
29. Parhaiya
30. Santhal
31. Sauria Paharia
32. Savar

== Demographics ==
Scheduled Tribes dominated district of Jharkhand, Census 2011.

According to the 2011 census, the Scheduled Tribe population of Jharkhand is 8,645,042, which constitutes 26.21 percent of the state's total population. Among all States and UTs, Jharkhand holds 6th and 10th rank terms of the ST population and the percentage share of the ST population to the total population of the State respectively. The growth of the ST population has been 17.3 percent, which is lower by 6 percentage points if compared with the growth of the State's total population (23.3 percent) during 1991–2001. The state has thirty Scheduled Tribes and all of them have been enumerated at the 2001 census. The Scheduled Tribes are primarily rural as 91.7 percent of them reside in villages. District-wise distribution of ST population shows that Gumla district has the highest proportion of STs (68.94 percent). The STs constitute more than half of the total population in Lohardaga (56.89 per cent) and Pashchimi Singhbhum (67.31 percent) districts whereas Ranchi has 35.76 percent and Pakur district has 42.1 percent tribal population. Koderma district (0.96 percent) preceded by Chatra (4.37 percent) has the lowest proportion of the STs Population.

Scheduled Tribes	Historical population (includes Bihar population up to 1991)					Demographics based on latest census							
Scheduled Tribes	Historical population (includes Bihar population up to 1991)					Latest population (2011)		Sex ratio	Literacy rate			WPR	
Scheduled Tribes	1961	1971	1981	1991	2001	num.	%	Sex ratio	Total	Male	Female	Main workers	Marginal workers
Asur	5,819	7,026	7,782	9623	10,347	22,459	0.26	958	37.09	45.8	28	23.96	23.5
Baiga	951	1,807	3,553	3,930	2,508	3,582	0.04	958	29.03	34.88	22.93	11.92	34.56
Banjara	42	130	412	861	374	487	0.01	1012	32.44	44.21	20.82	23	16.02
Bathudi	456	880	1,595	2,706	1,114	3,464	0.04	975	44	53.71	34.04	23.67	26.3
Bedia	38,241	48,021	60,445	72,219	83,771	100,161	1.16	995	49.16	58.61	39.66	23.5	19.27
Bhumij	101,057	124,918	136,110	155,961	181,329	209,448	2.42	996	47.7	59.05	36.3	18.11	28.4
Binjhia	6,725	9,119	10,009	13,090	12,428	14,404	0.17	968	48.17	58.74	37.25	27.8	23.49
Birhor	2,438	3,464	4,376	8,083	7,514	10,726	0.12	960	26.4	31.63	20.96	20.21	27.23
Birjia	4,029	3,628	4,057	6,191	5,365	6,276	0.07	977	39.71	48.9	30.3	22.32	27.26
Chero	30,845	38,741	52,147	67,447	75,540	95,575	1.11	956	52.35	62.64	41.58	12.74	25.4
Chik Baraik	30,770	33,476	40,339	46,568	44,427	54,163	0.63	997	54.77	63.78	45.73	26.38	21.35
Gond	33,521	48,869	53,574	104,402	52,614	53,676	0.62	994	50.47	59.79	41.09	25.15	21.92
Gorait	4,793	3,239	5,206	5,926	3,957	4,973	0.06	968	51.48	60.43	42.23	22.48	21.01
Ho	454,746	505,172	536,524	631,541	744,850	928,289	10.74	1021	43.72	54.05	33.61	21.64	24.24
Karmali	26,509	26,908	38,652	47,485	56,865	64,154	0.74	932	52.2	61.55	42.16	19.72	17.42
Kawar (Note: The Kawar and Kol tribes were notified as Scheduled Tribes of Jharkhand in 2003.)	—N/a	—N/a	—N/a	—N/a	—N/a	8,145	0.09	995	54.49	65.09	43.83	27.46	23.89
Kharia	108,983	127,002	141,771	151,634	164,022	196,135	2.27	1019	55.66	61.53	49.9	26.84	23.79
Kharwar	109,357	139,212	222,758	242,558	192,024	248,974	2.88	964	45.04	54.57	35.16	14.58	29.58
Khond	814	596	1,263	5,519	196	221	0	939	53.39	64.04	42.06	20.81	25.79
Kisan	12,011	16,903	23,420	30,766	31,568	37,265	0.43	974	40.3	49.08	31.29	21.98	31.8
Kol	—N/a	—N/a	—N/a	—N/a	—N/a	53,584	0.62	982	38.11	48.33	27.7	16.15	28.41
Kora	13,824	20,804	33,951	39,903	23,192	32,786	0.38	989	46.14	56.75	35.4	17.27	25.38
Korwa	21,162	18,717	21,940	24,871	27,177	35,606	0.41	978	29.41	35.67	23	13.06	37.95
Lohra	92,609	116,828	169,090	180,806	185,004	216,226	2.5	977	45.9	54.71	36.88	22.94	23.09
Mahli	67,979	74,452	91,928	107,645	121,174	152,663	1.77	992	44.81	54.49	35.05	26.92	21.1
Mal Paharia	45,423	48,636	79,322	86,790	115,093	135,797	1.57	1003	31.36	38.81	23.93	22.17	27.13
Munda	628,931	723,166	845,887	920,148	1,049,767	1,229,221	14.22	1001	52.47	60.96	44	25.53	22.45
Oraon	735,025	876,218	1,048,064	1,214,708	1,390,459	1,716,618	19.86	1007	56.4	63.7	49.15	24.19	21.23
Parhiya	12,268	14,651	24,012	30,421	20,786	25,585	0.3	958	25.57	32.2	18.65	11.98	33.73
Santal	1,541,345	1,801,304	2,060,732	2,349,492	2,410,509	2,754,723	31.86	1009	42.32	52.19	32.54	19.04	29.05
Savar	1,561	3,548	3,014	4,264	6,004	9,688	0.11	992	26.93	34.66	19.13	14.83	33.39
Suria Paharia	55,606	59,047	39,269	48,761	31,050	46,222	0.53	1012	31.6	39.05	24.25	20.85	30.71
Unclassified	16,930	36,285	49,665	2,595	36,040	173,746	2.01	988	46.07	55.12	36.92	21.41	27.35
Total	4,204,770	4,932,767	5,810,867	6,616,914	7,087,068	8,645,042	100	1003	47.44	56.44	38.47	21.68	25.26

=== Religion ===
Religions of Scheduled Tribes of Jharkhand, 2011 census
1. Sarna (45.2%)
2. Hinduism (37.5%)
3. Christianity (15.5%)
4. Addi Bassi (0.48%)
5. Bidin (0.33%)
6. Other religion and belief (0.63%)
7. Religion not stated (0.30%)

As per 2011 census, the Scheduled Tribes population in Jharkhand totals 8,645,042. Among them, the largest group follows the Sarna religion, with 3,910,313 adherents. Hindus comprise 3,245,856, and Christians number 1,338,175. Other notable groups include Adi Bassi with 41,680, Bidin with 28,954, and Muslims with 18,107. Smaller communities consist of Adi (8,989), Buddhists (2,946), Sumra Sandhi (2,723), Birsa (2,339), Gond/Gondi (2,292), Tana Bhagat (1,068), Sikhs (984), Santals (938), Sarnam (740), Oraon (709), Munda (696), Ho (695), Paharia (518), Sarvdharm (432), Kharwar (385), Jains (381), Achinthar (273), Saranath (153), Krupa (133), Dupub (122), Malla (111), Marangboro (87), Kuir (69), Loco Bohra (64), and Nature Religion (311). Those whose religion is not stated number 25,971, and other unclassified religions account for 7,828 individuals.

==== Sarna ====
Although Hinduism is the predominant religion of the State (68.6 percent), the tribes constitute 39.8 percent only. As many as 45.1 percent of the tribal population follow 'other religions and persuasions'. Christian tribes are 14.5 percent and less than half percent (0.4 percent) are Muslims. Among the major tribes, more than half of the total population (56.6 percent) of nature worshiping Santals are 'Bedins' who also worship bongas. Oraon and Munda have more than 50 percent of the population follow other religions and persuasions followed by Christianity. Ho tribe has the highest proportion (91 percent) of persons professing 'other religions and persuasions'.

=== Language ===
Languages of Scheduled Tribes of Jharkhand, 2011 census
1. Santali (33.0%)
2. Sadan/Sadri (Note: including 3.79% Nagpuria) (14.0%)
3. Ho (11.1%)
4. Kurukh (10.8%)
5. Mundari (10.5%)
6. Hindi (6.60%)
7. Khortha/Khotta (3.20%)
8. Bengali (2.93%)
9. Pahariya (1.68%)
10. Kharia (1.59%)
11. Magadhi/Magahi (1.14%)
12. Other (3.41%)

According to the 2011 census, Santali is the most prevalent language, spoken by 2,854,878 individuals, followed by Ho with 960,389 speakers, Kurukh/Oraon with 935,458, Mundari with 904,491 speakers, Sadan/Sadri with 885,746 speakers, Hindi with 570,444, Nagpuria with 327,847, Khortha/Khotta with 285,303 speakers, Bengali with 253,434 speakers, and Pahariya with 145,588 speakers. Kharia counts 137,413 speakers, Magadhi/Magahi 98,186, Panch Pargania 81,275, Odia 30,130, and Karmali 27,681. Furthermore, smaller tribal languages include Bhojpuri (20,589), Mahili (18,322), Kol (15,032), Bhumij (8,401), Palmuha (5,733), Koda/Kora (3,301), Munda (2,342), Chhattisgarhi (1,410), Lohra (1,325), Urdu (1,249), and Koli (1,086).

=== Literacy ===
Education level of 47.44% literate Scheduled Tribes of Jharkhand, 2011 census
1. Primary (28.9%)
2. Below primary (27.7%)
3. Middle school (17.4%)
4. Matric/Secondary (10.6%)
5. Higher Secondary/Intermediate (6.27%)
6. Literate without Educational level (5.39%)
7. Graduation (3.52%)
8. Technical diploma or certificate not equal to degree (0.22%)
9. Non-Technical diploma or certificate not equal to degree (0.02%)

According to the 2011 Census, within Jharkhand's Scheduled Tribes population, 47.44% are literate, while 52.56% are illiterate. Of the literate individuals, 28.94% have completed primary education, 27.67% have education below the primary level, 17.35% have reached the middle level, 10.61% have attained matric/secondary education, and 6.27% have completed higher secondary/intermediate. Additionally, 5.39% are literate without any specific educational level, 3.52% hold a graduate degree or above, 0.22% have technical diplomas or certificates not equivalent to a degree, and 0.02% possess non-technical diplomas or certificates not equivalent to a degree.

The overall literacy rate among the STs has increased from 27.5 percent at the 1991 census to 40.7 percent at the 2001 census. Despite this improvement, the literacy rate among the tribes is much below in comparison to that of all STs at the national level (47.1 percent). Among the numerically larger tribes, Oraon and Kharia have more than half of the population in the age of seven years and above are literate while Munda have a literacy rate almost equal to that of all STs at the national level. Among the total tribal literates, 33.6 percent are either without any educational level or have attained education below the primary level. The proportions of literates who have attained education up to primary level and middle level are 28.6 percent and 17.7 percent respectively. Persons educated up to matric / secondary / higher secondary constitute 16.5 percent. This implies that every 6th tribal literate is matriculate. Graduates and above are 3.5 percent while non-technical and technical diploma holders constitute a negligible 0.1 percent. Out of the total 1980,000 tribal children in the age group 5–14 years, only 850,000 children have been attending school constituting 43.1 percent. As many as 1130,000 (56.9 percent) children in the corresponding age group have not been going to school. The statement below shows that among the major STs, Munda, Oraon and Kharia have more than 50 percent school-going children whereas Santhal, Ho, and Lohra have 36–47 percent of children attending school.

== Culture ==
=== Sarhul ===
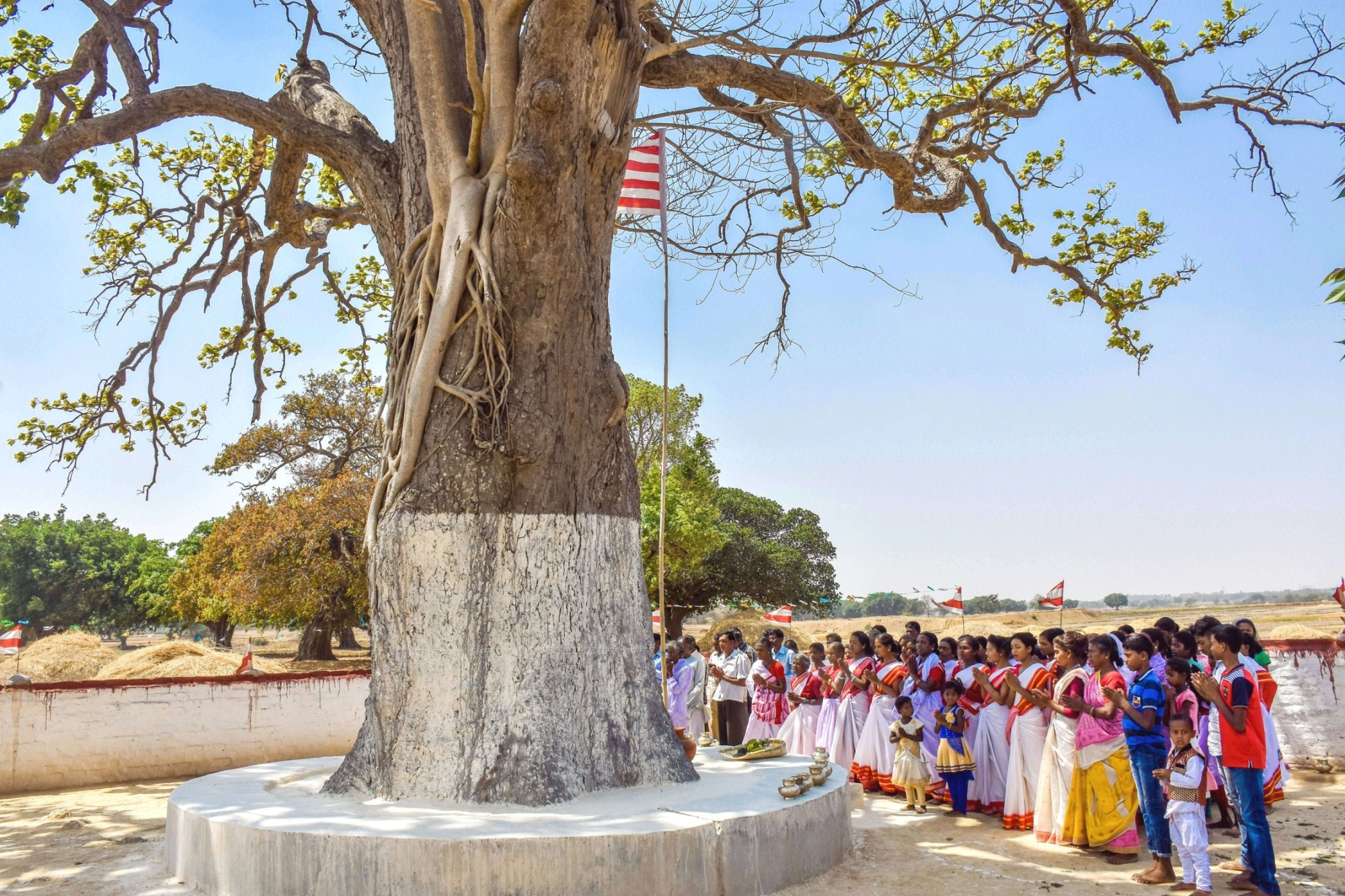
People worshiping under holy sarna tree on the occasion of sarhul in outskirts of Ranchi, Jharkhand.

Sarhul is a spring festival celebrated when the Saal trees get new flowers on their branches. It is a worship of the village deity who is considered to be the protector of the tribes. People sing and dance when the new flowers appear. The deities are worshiped with sal flowers. The village priest or Pahan fasts for a couple of days. In the early morning, he takes a bath and puts on new a dhoti made of virgin cotton (kachha dhaga). The previous evening, the Pahan takes three new earthen pots and fills them with fresh water; the next morning he observes these earthen pots and the water level inside. If the water level decreases he predicts that there will be famine or less rain, and if the water level is normal, that is the signal of good rain. Before pooja starts, the wife of the Pahan washes his feet and gets blessings from him. At the pooja, Pahan offers three young roosters of different colors to one for the god — the Singbonga or Dharmesh, as the Bhumijs, Mundas, Hos and Oraons respectively address him; another for the village deities; and the third for the ancestors. During this pooja villagers surround the Sarna place. Traditional drum – Dhol, Nagara and Turhi – players keep drumming and playing along with Pahan chanting prayers to deities. When pooja is finished, boys carry Pahan on their shoulders and girls dancing ahead take him to his house where his wife welcomes him by washing his feet. Then Pahan offers Sal flowers to his wife and villagers. These flowers represent the brotherhood and friendship among villagers and Pahan the priest, distributes sal flowers to every villager. He also puts sals flowers on every house's roof which is called "phool khonsi". At the same time Prasad, a rice-made beer called Handia, is distributed among the villagers. And the whole village celebrates with singing and dancing this festival of Sarhul. It goes on for weeks in this region of Chhotanagpur. In the Kolhan region it is called "Baa Porob" meaning Flower Festival.

=== Baha Parab ===
Baha parab is the spring festival of Ho, Munda and Santal people. Baha means flower in Munda languages. People worship Marang buru in jaherthan or sacred grove.

=== Sohrai ===
Sohrai is the harvest festival of Santal people residing in India, Bangladesh and Nepal. Sohrai also known as Khuntaw means tie in Santali language. Sohrai is celebrated for five days, where the first day is called Um Maha, second day Dakay Maha or Bonga Maha, third day Khuntaw Maha, fourth day Jale Maha and fifth day Sendra Maha. The celebration if practiced in the month of November. Second and third day are mostly known for entertainment through group dance and music can be seen in all Santal tribes village. Sendra Maha is dedicated for hunting in the jungles. People worship Marang buru in jaherthan or sacred grove before the beginning of the Sohrai celebration. The second day is reserved for each Santal individual worshiping Marang Buru in their home as Garh Bonga means Home Deity.

=== Mage Porob ===
Mage Porob is the principal festival celebrated among the Ho people of eastern India, and is also celebrated by the Munda people, though followers of Birsa Dharam, a new religion based on traditional Munda spirituality and religion, do not celebrate Mage Porob, although they celebrate other traditional Munda festivals. It is also not celebrated by any other Munda-speaking peoples, and is much less prominent to the Mundas than to the Hos. It is held in the month of Magha in honor of the deity Singbonga who, in the Ho creation myth, created Luku Kola, the first man on Earth. It was first described in 1912 by Indian anthropologist Rai Bahadur Sarat Chandra Roy in his The Mundas and their Country.

=== Hal Punhya ===
Hal Punhya is a festival the begins with winter. The first day of Magha month, known as "Akhain Jatra" or "Hal Punhya", is considered as the beginning of ploughing season. The farmers, to symbolize this auspicious morning plough two and half circles of their agricultural land. This day is also considered as the symbol of good fortune.

=== Sendra festival ===
Sendra festival, locally known as Disum Sendra is an annual hunting festival celebrated on the top of Dalma Hills by the tribal people of Chotanagpur region. It is celebrated on the full moon day in the month of Baisakh (usually from April to May) to rejuvenate both the youth of the tribal communities and the wild animals of the forest. On this occasion, hunting games are organized in the dark. The festival is commonly celebrated by the Santal, Bhumij, Munda, Ho, Birhor and Kharia peoples.

== Tribal artwork ==
- Tribal woodwork – Jharkhand is full of supposedly good quality saal forest and hence wooden artwork in the "should" of tribals. The wood is used for cooking, housing, farming, fishing, arts, etc.
- Tribal Painting – The painting is mainly a source of "livelihood" for the Hyhyh tribe in Jharkhand and practiced in the region of Santhal Pragana and nearby areas.
- Tribal Bamboo Artwork – The bamboo found in this area are different from bamboo of Southeast Asia. There is tourist place, Netarhat, which means a Bazaar of Bamboo. The tribal people use bamboo for making baskets, hunting & fishing equipment such as fishing cages.
- with the help of TATA foundation
  Godna – They believe that all ornaments are human made and are mortal. Therefore, they invented tattoos as permanent ornament. Majority of tribal woman have tattoos called Godna, on their bodies. However, tribal man also use Godna. They believe that Godna are the only ornament which goes with them after death.

== See also ==
- Tribal revolts in India before Indian independence
