= Tribal Research Institute and Museum =

- Established: 2006
- Location: Morabadi, Ranchi, Jharkhand
- Coordinates: 23.39415°N 85.33323°E
- Type: Tribal museum
- Collections: stone sculptures, terracotta, arms, ethnological object
- Visitors: ~1,000 (monthly)
- Owner: Government of Jharkhand
- Website: ekalyan.cgg.gov.in

Tribal Research Institute Museum is in Ranchi, the capital of the Indian state of Jharkhand.

== Tribes displayed ==
- Asur
- Baiga
- Bedia
- Bhumij
- Binjhia
- Birhor
- Birjia
- Kanwar
- Karmali
- Kharia
- Kharwar
- Khond
- Kora
- Munda
- Oraon
- Lohra
- Asur
- Santal
- Sauriya Paharia
- Sawar
