= Christianity in Jharkhand =

Overview of Christianity in the Indian state of Jharkhand

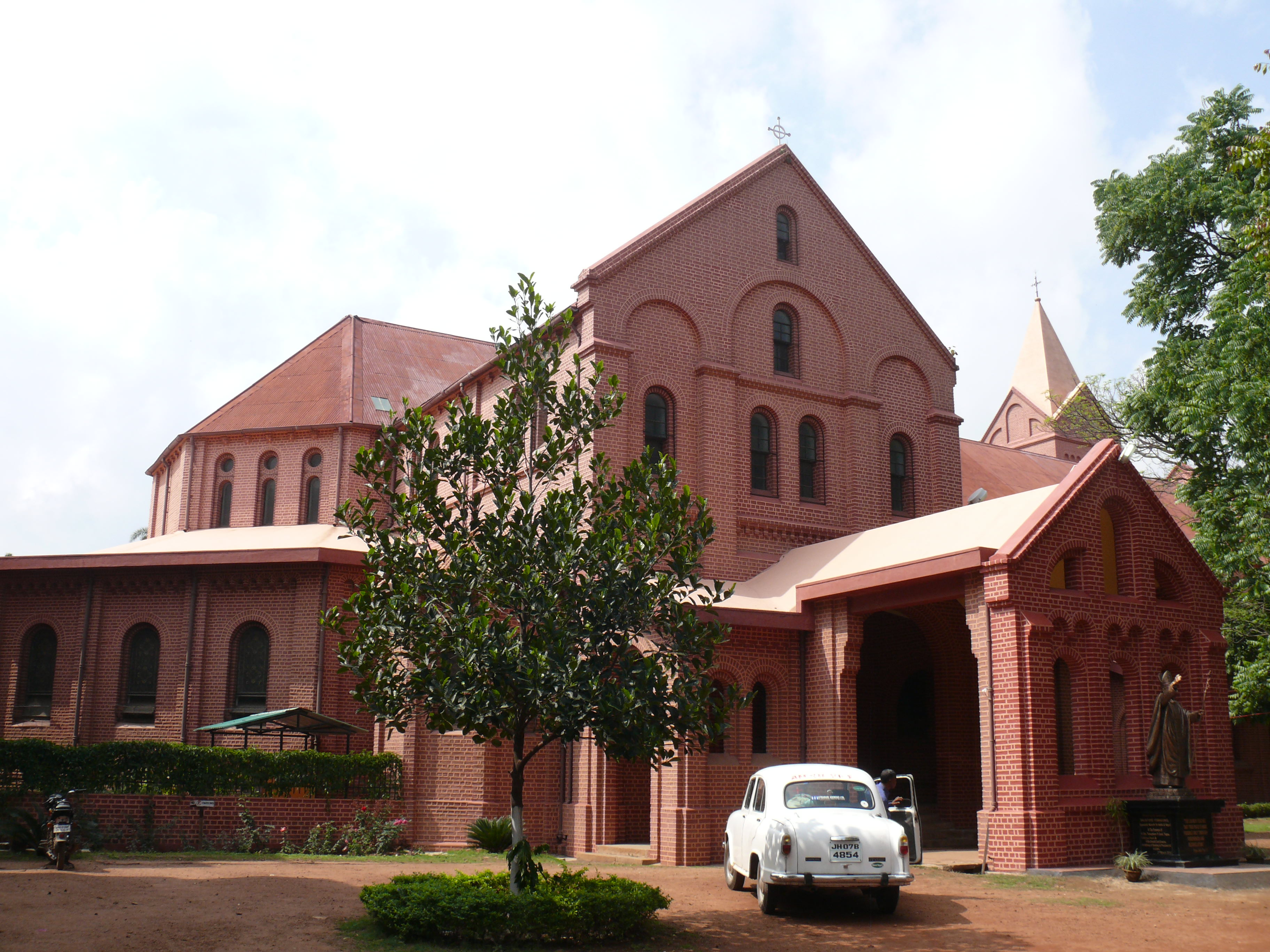
Outer view of St. Mary's Cathedral, mother church of the Roman Catholic Archdiocese in Ranchi.

Christians are a religious community residing in the Indian state of Jharkhand. As per 2011 Census of India, 4.3% of people in Jharkhand are Christians. Christians are majority in Simdega district of Jharkhand.

== Overview ==
Christianity is a minority religion in Jharkhand, a state (formerly Southern region of Bihar state, colloquially Chota Nagpur division) of India. Jharkhand is known for tribals such as Munda, Santhal, Oraon and Kharia. A Roman Catholic Archdiocese of Ranchi exists. St. Mary's Cathedral in Ranchi has been a cathedral since 1909. The Church of North India has a Diocese of Chota Nagpur with a seat at Ranchi. The Church of North India has a St. Paul's Cathedral in Ranchi. Gossner Theological College is in Jharkhand. Many Munda & Kharia are Christians. The then pope visited Ranchi in 1986. The Gossner Evangelical Lutheran Church in Chotanagpur and Assam has its seat in Ranchi. Dhanbad has Oriental Orthodox Churches.

Christian missionaries from the Lutheran Church arrived in today's Jharkhand in 1845. Jesuit missionaries arrived in the region in 1869.

== History ==
=== Pre-independence era ===
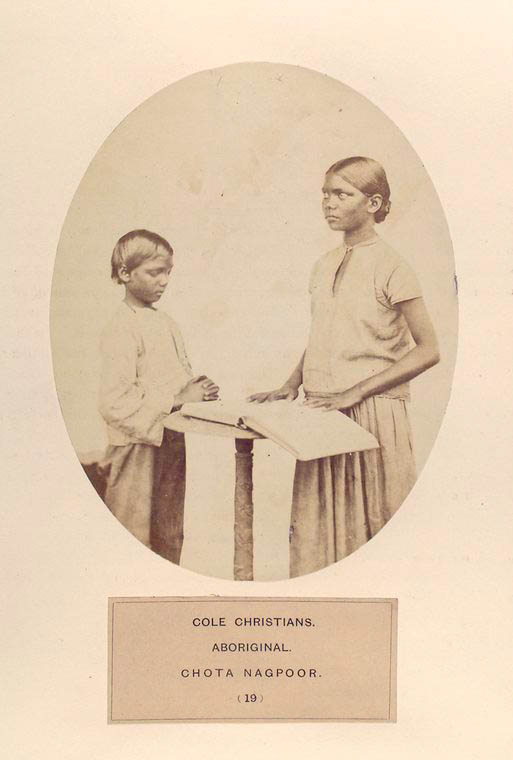
Aboriginal Christian of Chota Nagpur, c. 1868 – c. 1875

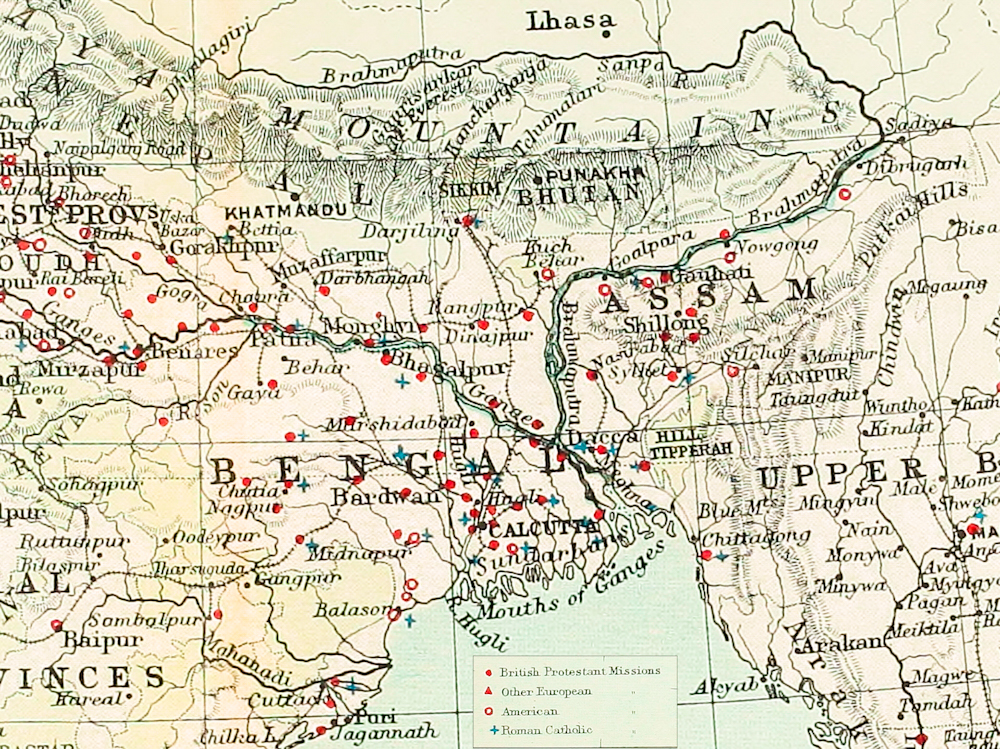
Christian Mission Stations of the Indian Empire, 1893

Erstwhile Ranchi comprising the Christianity region of Jharkhand, 1901–31

Christianity was introduced to Chota Nagpur in 1845 through the arrival of German Evangelical Lutheran missionaries, including Pastors Schatz, Brandt, Batsch, and Janke, following their unsuccessful efforts in Calcutta after arriving from Berlin in 1844. These missionaries were initially heading for Mergui in Myanmar (formerly Burma) in view of preaching the Christian faith among the Karen people or in the areas located in the footsteps of the Himalayas. However, on meeting some people from Ranchi, they changed their plan and headed for Chota Nagpur and its main town, Ranchi. They reached Ranchi on 2 November 1845 and camped on, what is now known as, the 'Bethesda Ground' in Ranchi. Anglican missionary work was established at Ranchi in 1869 under the Anglican Bishop of Calcutta, followed by the establishment of a Roman Catholic mission in 1885 after the arrival of Father Constant Lievens. The Dublin University Mission from Ireland began its work in the region in 1890. Similarly, in Santhal Parganas the Norwegian Santal Mission established in 1867. By 1872, the Christian population in the region (modern Jharkhand) was 16,190, which increased to 43,535, 96,125, and 155,606 in the 1881, 1891, and 1901 censuses, respectively. (Note: Area of consideration: Chota Nagpur Tributary States (39,940 km^{2}, incl. northern part of present-day Chhattisgarh), the District of Chota Nagpur Division, and Santhal Parganas, with the 49,389 square miles (127,920 km^{2}) total area, which corresponds to the present-day 79,710 square kilometres area of Jharkhand.) The growth of Christianity in the region was largely among the tribal communities, which contributed to the rise of anti-conversion movements like the Birsa Munda Movement and the Tana Bhagat Movement.

=== Post-independence era ===
After India became independent, the missionaries who remained post independence, worked for the improvement standard of living and providing education to the children of the tribals. Evidently many of the tribals emerged as sportsmen especially in the game of hockey and football.

Even the first Prime Minister of India, Dr. Jawaharlal Nehru, in his The Discovery of India acknowledges the contribution of the early missionaries for development of tribals dialect stating that even laboured at the dialects of the primitive hill and forest tribes...

Christian missionaries work in tribal belt of Jharkhand, c. 1950 – c. 1960
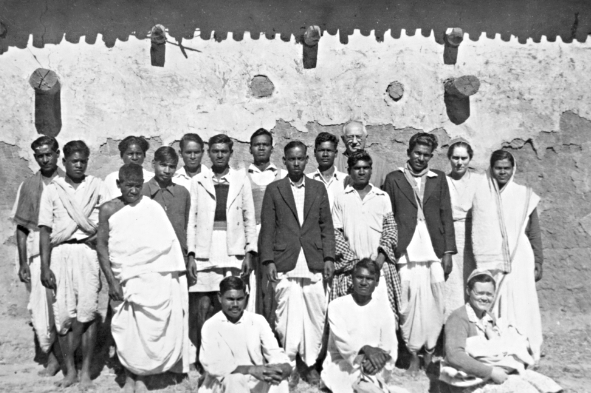
Worker's Meeting, Hisri (1950).

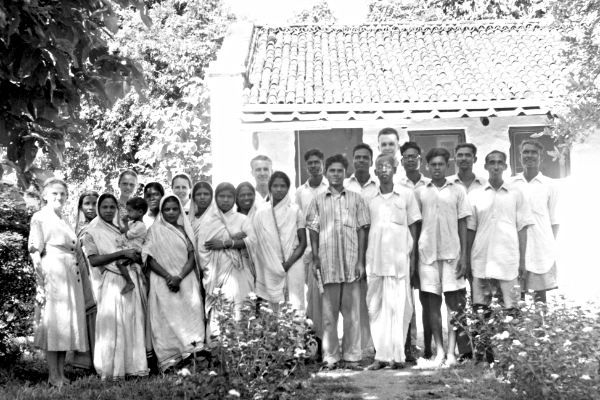
Trainee of Chandwa Bible Training School (1957).

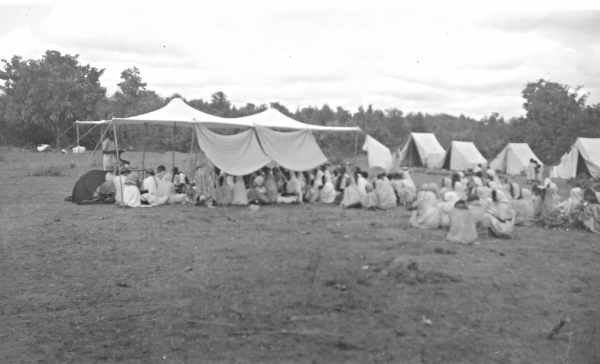
Bihar (present-day Jharkhand) Church Conference, India (1958).

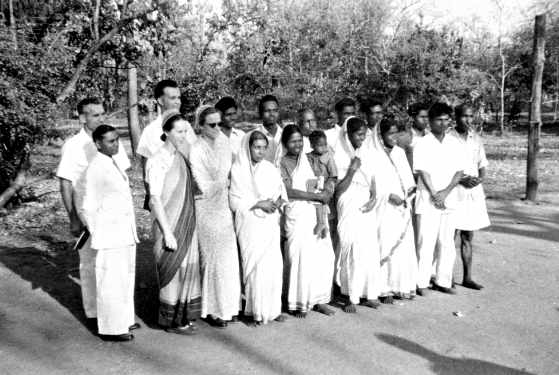
Class of 12 who received diplomas. O. P. Lal, teachers: John and Miriam Beachy, Paul and Esther Kniss (1959).

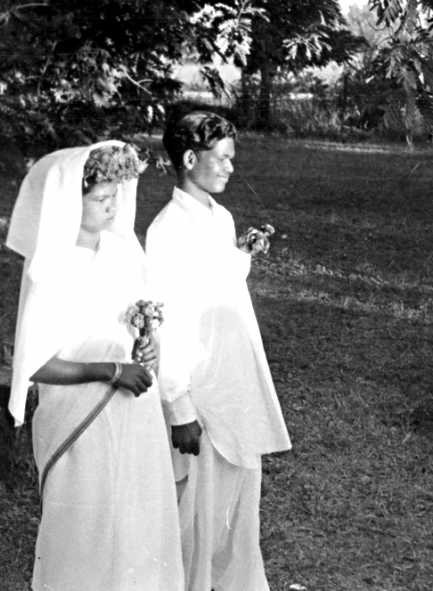
Christian bridegroom (1961)

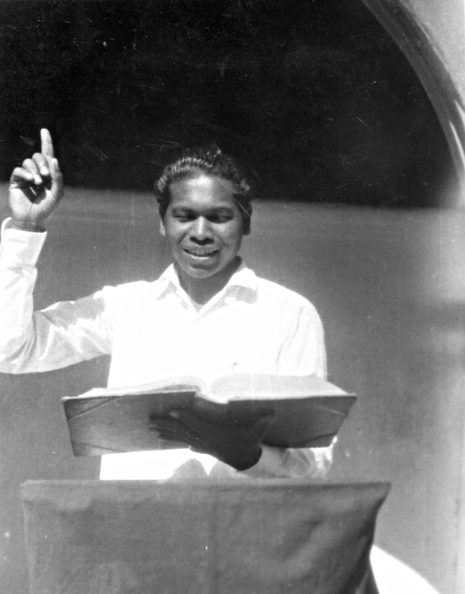
Evangelist Paikas Toppo preaching "Lo, I am with you always" (1962).

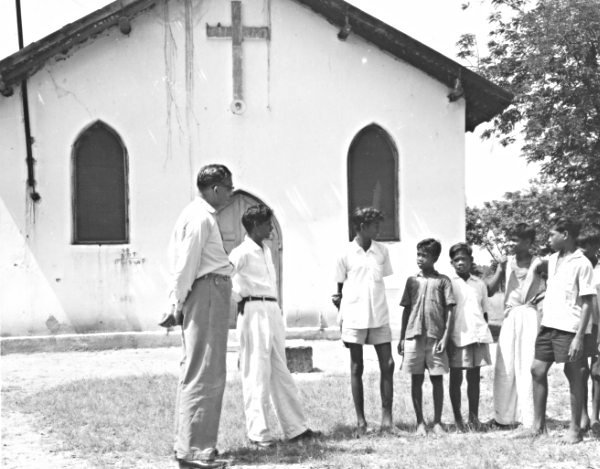
Mirchulal (on left) talks with Christians of the Latehar congregation (1964).

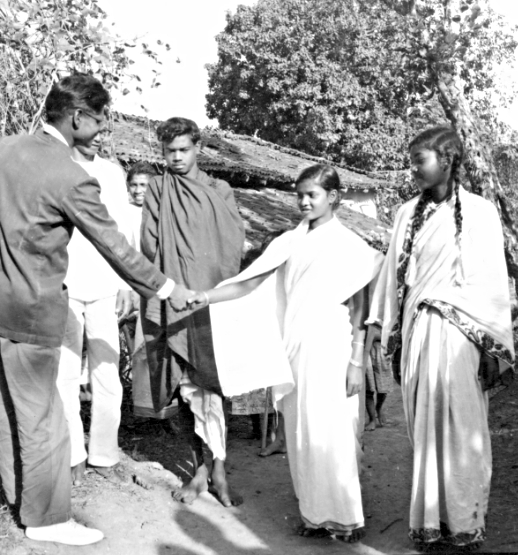
Pastor Sushil Khakha welcomes three newly baptized members into church fellowship in Nareshgarh (1967).

== Demographics ==
Christianity in Jharkhand

Year	Pop.	±%
1872	16,190	—
1881	43,535	+168.9%
1891	96,125	+120.8%
1901	155,606	+61.9%
1911	209,923	+34.9%
1921	234,724	+11.8%
1931	389,770	+66.1%
1941		—

Year	Pop.	±%
1951	415,548	—
1961	502,195	+20.9%
1971	658,717	+31.2%
1981	740,186	+12.4%
1991	843,717	+14.0%
2001	1,093,382	+29.6%
2011	1,418,608	+29.7%

Note: Prior to the 1951, the area corresponding to present-day Jharkhand is used; 1951–2001 census, Bihar's figure also included (but the Christian population in present-day Bihar was minimal), from which Jharkhand was bifurcated in 2000.
Source: Census of India

Christianity among social group of Jharkhand, 2011 census
1. Scheduled Tribes (94.3%)
2. General (incl. converted Scheduled Castes) population (5.67%)

Concentration of Christianity in Jharkhand, 2011

According to the 2011 census, the Christian population in the state stood at 1,418,608, reflecting an increase of 29.75% from the 2001 census, which recorded 1,093,382 Christians. Simdega district has the highest concentration of Christians, accounting for 51.14% of its population, followed by Khunti at 25.66% and Gumla at 19.75%. The Scheduled Tribes, primarily Oraon, Munda, Santal, Kharia, Mal Paharia, Sauria Paharia, Ho (Kolha) constitute 94.33% (1,338,175) of the Christian population, while remaining 5.67% (80,433) belongs to the general population (including converted Scheduled Castes) of the state. The breakdown of Christianity among Scheduled Tribes is:

Statistics of Christianity among tribes, 2011 census
Scheduled Tribe Community	Christian Pop.	Pct. of Christians in Community	Pct. of Christians in ST Christians	Pct. of Christians in State Christians
Asur, Agaria	2,079	9.26	0.16	0.15
Baiga	20	0.56	0	0
Banjara	5	1.03	0	0
Bathudi	4	0.12	0	0
Bedia	136	0.14	0.01	0.01
Bhumij	600	0.29	0.04	0.04
Binjhia	68	0.47	0.01	0
Birhor	684	6.38	0.05	0.05
Birjia	2,010	32.03	0.15	0.14
Chero	126	0.13	0.01	0.01
Chik Baraik	1,959	3.62	0.15	0.14
Generic Tribes	19,285	11.1	1.44	1.36
Gond	316	0.59	0.02	0.02
Gorait	43	0.86	0	0
Ho	19,891	2.14	1.49	1.4
Karmali	142	0.22	0.01	0.01
Kawar	63	0.77	0	0
Kharia, Dhelki Kharia, Dudh Kharia, Hill Kharia	133,249	67.94	9.96	9.39
Kharwar	401	0.16	0.03	0.03
Khond	33	14.93	0	0
Kisan, Nagesia	1,103	2.96	0.08	0.08
Kol	594	1.11	0.04	0.04
Kora, Mudi -Kora	455	1.39	0.03	0.03
Korwa	805	2.26	0.06	0.06
Lohra	7,408	3.43	0.55	0.52
Mahli	8,618	5.65	0.64	0.61
Mal Paharia, Kumarbhag Paharia	24,482	18.03	1.83	1.73
Munda, Patar	403,466	32.82	30.15	28.44
Oraon, Dhangar (Oraon)	449,092	26.16	33.56	31.66
Parhaiya	229	0.9	0.02	0.02
Santal	236,304	8.58	17.66	16.66
Sauria Paharia	24,357	52.7	1.82	1.72
Savar	148	1.53	0.01	0.01
Total ST Community	1,338,175	15.48	100	94.33

== Churches and ministry ==
The major denominations and church bodies in the state are given below.

- Roman Catholic Church having 1,058,812 members in 8 dioceses and 280 parishes.
- Gossner Evangelical Lutheran Church having 583,960 members in 1,895 congregations.
- North Western Gossner Evangelical Lutheran Church having 135,000 members in 735 congregations.

The other smaller denominations are:

- India Pentecostal Church of God
- Dipti Mission
- Bihar Mennonite Mandli
- Gospel Echoing Missionary Society
