= Sarat Chandra Roy =

Indian scholar of anthropology

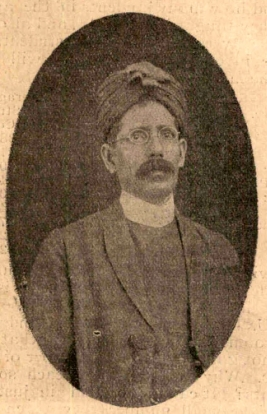
- Born: 4 November 1871; Karapara, Khulna District, Bengal Presidency, British India
- Died: 30 April 1942 (aged 70); Ranchi, Bihar Province, British India
- Other name: S.C. Roy
- Occupations: Lawyer, ethnographer, cultural anthropologist, lecturer, reader
- Known for: Ethnography

Sarat Chandra Roy (4 November 1871 – 30 April 1942) was an Indian scholar of anthropology. He is sometimes regarded as the 'father of Indian ethnography', the 'first Indian ethnographer', and as the 'first Indian anthropologist'.

== Early life ==
Born on 4 November 1871 to Purna Chandra Roy, a member of the Bengal Judicial Service, in a village in Khulna District (now in Bangladesh), young Sarat came in contact with tribal people after his father was posted in Purulia. After his father's death in 1885, he was educated at his maternal uncle's home in Calcutta. In 1892, he graduated in English literature from the General Assembly's Institution (now Scottish Church College). He earned a postgraduate degree in English from the same institution, and subsequently studied law at the Ripon College (now Surendranath College). He had worked for some time as a headmaster at the Mymensingh High School, and later as a principal at the GEL Mission High School in Ranchi. In Ranchi, he became aware of the plight of the tribals. He left teaching and started practising as a lawyer and became a pleader in the district court in the 24 Parganas in Calcutta in 1897. A year later he moved to Ranchi, where he practised at the court of the judicial commissioner in Ranchi.

== Career in anthropology ==
His interest into the plight of the tribal people developed in the course of his visits as a lawyer, in the interior areas of the Chota Nagpur Division. He was deeply moved by the plight of the Munda, Oraon and other tribal groups, who were subjected to the continued oppression by an apathetic colonial administration, and by a general contempt towards them in courts of law, as "upper-caste" Hindu lawyers had little knowledge of their customs, religions, customary laws and languages. Keeping all this in perspective, he decided to spend years and decades among tribal folks to study their languages, conduct ethnography, and interpret their customs, practices, religion and laws for the benefit of humanity, and also for the established system of colonial civil jurisprudence. In so doing, he wrote pioneering monographs, that would set the ground for broader understanding and future research. Thus although he was not formally trained in either ethnology or anthropology, he is regarded the first Indian ethnologist, or ethnographer or an Indian anthropologist.

In his later years, he spent his time editing Man in India and in other journals, writing and lecturing at the newly established anthropology department at the University of Calcutta, and serving as a reader at Patna University.

== Works ==
=== Books and monographs ===
- The Mundas and Their Country (1912)
- The Oraons of Chota Nagpur (1915)
- The Birhors (1925)
- Oraon Religion and Customs (1927)
- The Hill Bhuiyas of Orissa (1935)
- The Kharias vol.1 (1937)
- The Kharias vol.2 (1937)

=== Journal contributions ===
- Man in India, the first anthropological journal in India was started by him in 1921.
- He wrote extensively on totemism among the Asur, the Ho people of Singhbhum, the Pahira of Chota Nagpur; on the Lepcha funeral; kinship among Sikkimese people, Khasi people; Khond human sacrifice; Korku memorial tablets; black Bhils of Jaisamand lake in Rajputana, and on the ethnic groups of Burma.

== Recognition ==
- Kaisar-i-Hind Silver Medal, 1913
- Roy Bahadur, 1919
- Elected as honorary member of the Folklore Society of London, being the only Indian to be awarded thus
- Elected as president of the Anthropological Section in the Indian Science Congress
- Elected as president of the Anthropology section of the All India Oriental Conference, 1932
- Elected as president of the Folklore section of the All India Oriental Conference, 1933
- Elected as member of the Council d'Honour of the International Congress of Ethnological Sciences
- Foundation Fellow of National Institute of Sciences
- Foundation Fellow of Patna University
- The Indian Science Congress awarded him with a commemorative volume of essays in anthropology.
- The Sarat Chandra Roy Institute of Anthropological Studies in Ranchi, established in 1979, commemorates his name.

== See also ==
- Anthropological Survey of India
- Biraja Sankar Guha
- Historical definitions of races in India
- L. P. Vidyarthi
- M. N. Srinivas
- Nirmal Kumar Bose
- Panchanan Mitra
- The People of India
