= List of United Arab Emirates Health Foundation Prize recipients =

This is a list of recipients of the United Arab Emirates Health Foundation Prize awarded by World Health Organization (WHO).

The prize was established in 1993 under the directive of HM Sheikh Zayed Bin Sultan Al Nahayyan (1918–2004). The prize consists of a certified award, a plaque, and up to US$40,000. The prize can be awarded to more than one person or institution that has made an outstanding contribution to health development.

== List of recipients ==
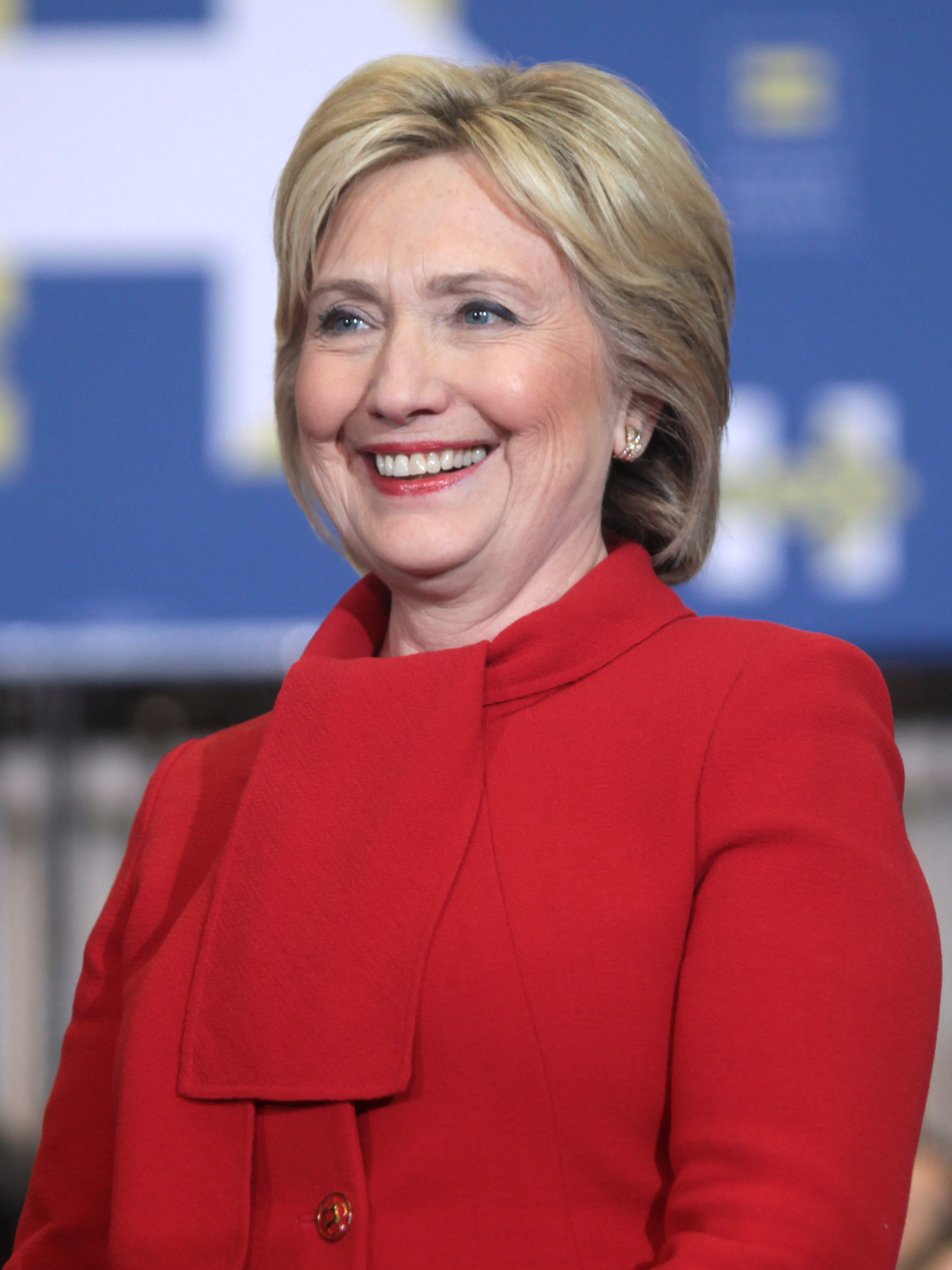
Hillary Clinton, 1998 laureate

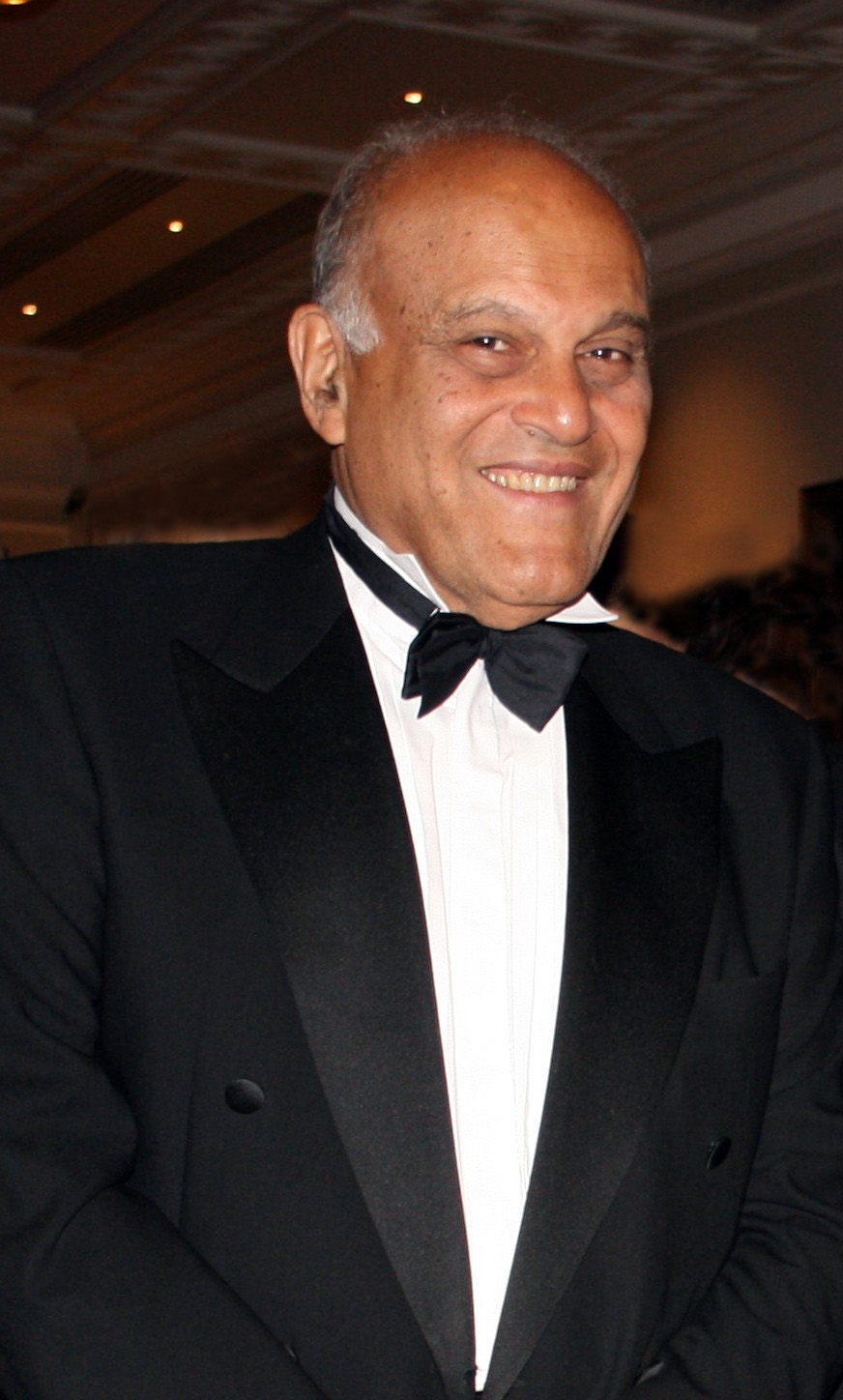
Magdi Habib Yacoub, 2003 laureate

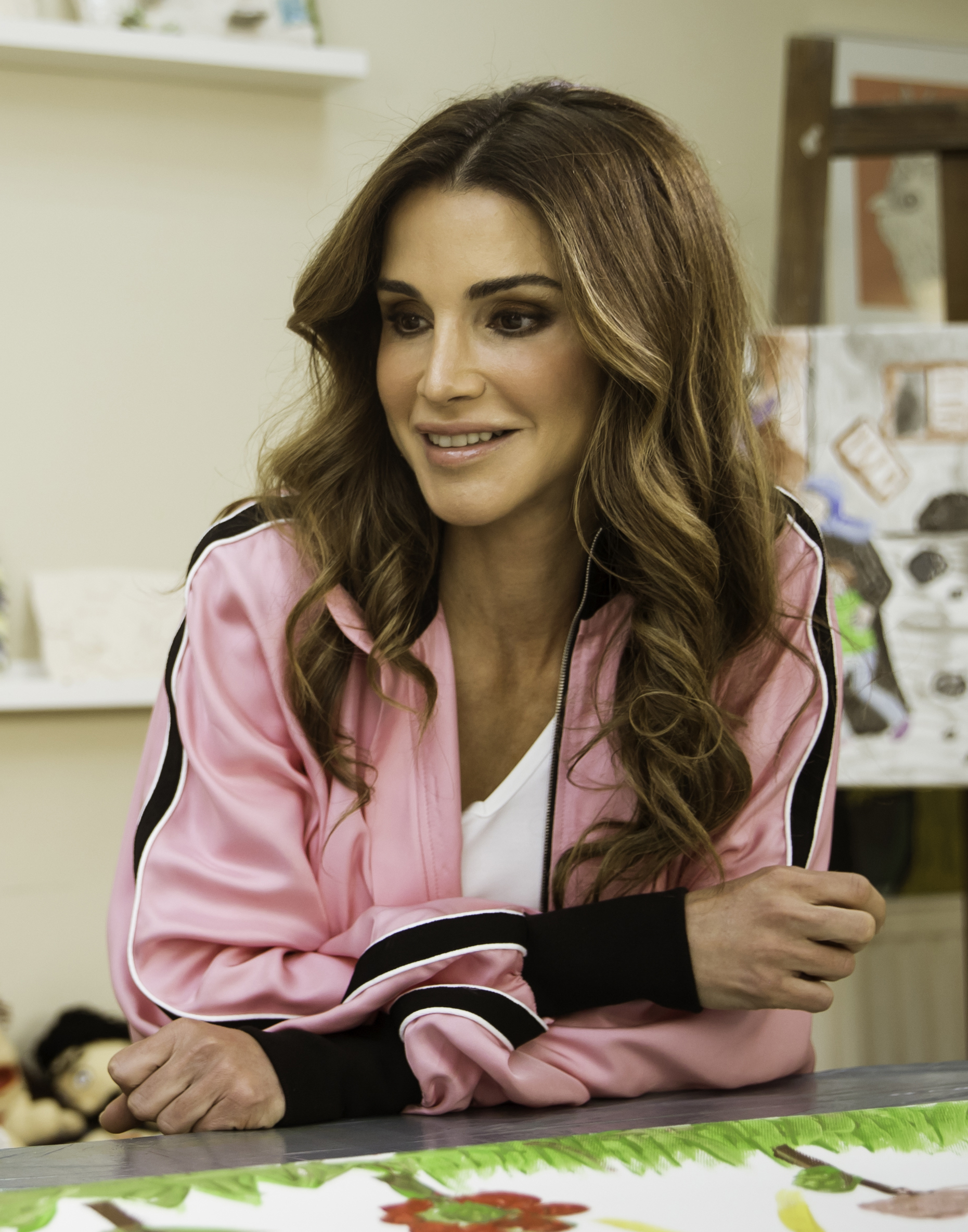
Queen Rania Al-Abdullah, 2005 laureate

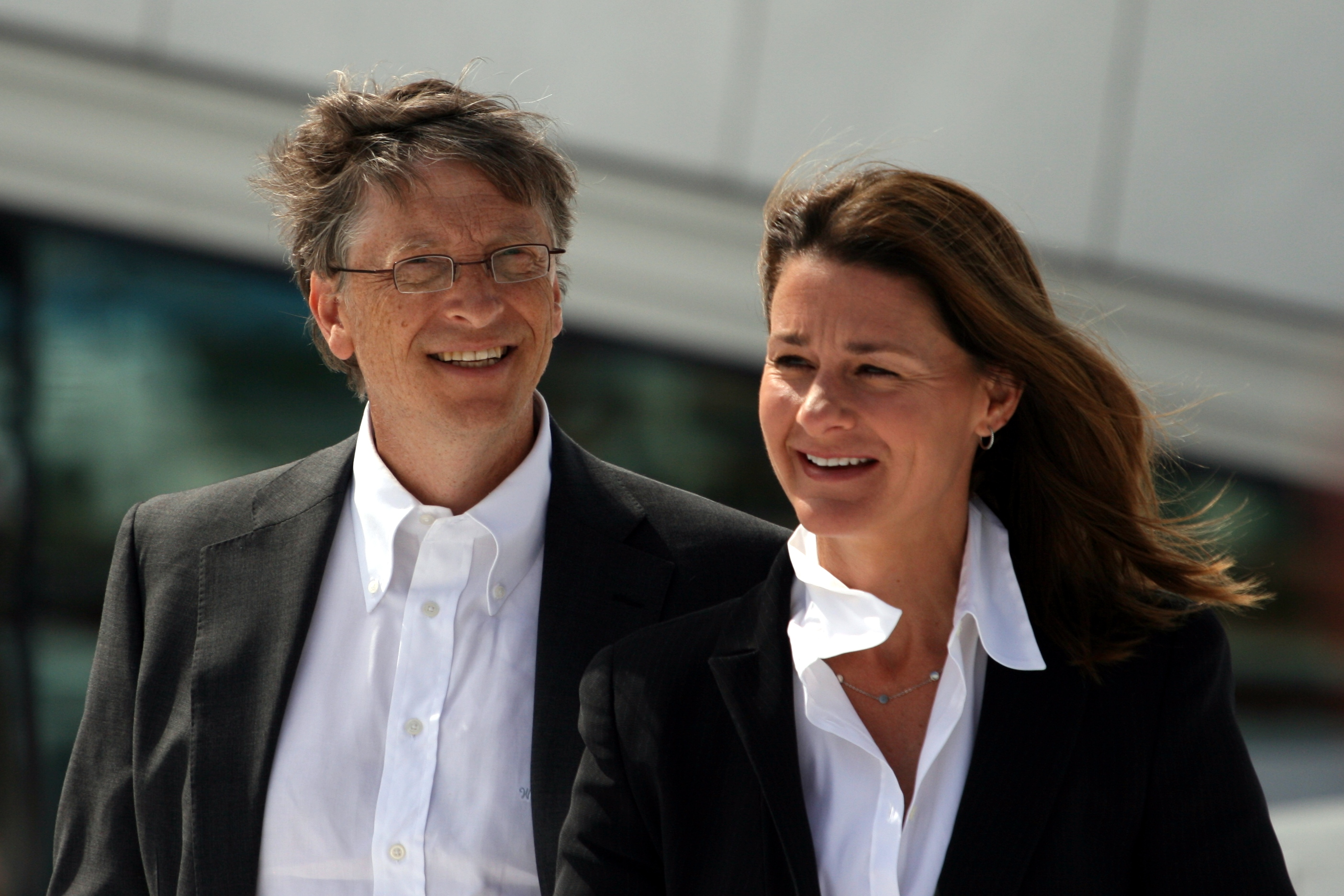
Bill & Melinda Gates Foundation, 2007 laureate

Year	Name	Country
1995	Child Survival Project of Egypt	Egypt
1995	Abdul Rahman Abdul Aziz Al-Swailem	Saudi Arabia
1996	Adnan A. Abbas	Jordan
1996	Khalifa A. Al-Jaber	Qatar
1997	Abdulrahman Abdullah Al-Awadi	Kuwait
1997	R. Salvatella Agrelo	Uruguay
1998	Hillary Clinton	USA
1999	Ismail A. Sallam	Egypt
1999	The Centre for Education about Drugs and Treatment of Drug-addicted Persons (KENTHEA)	Cyprus
2000	Roemwerdiniadi Soedoko	Indonesia
2000	The Institute of Nursing	Myanmar
2001	Ali Jaffer Mohammad Suleiman	Oman
2001	The Union of Palestinian Medical Relief Committees	Palestine
2002	Médecins sans frontières (MSF)	France
2002	Ibrahim Mohamed Yacoub	Bahrain
2003	Mahmoud M.A. Fikree	UAE
2003	Magdi Habib Yacoub	UK
2004	Shaukat Khanum Memorial Cancer Hospital	Pakistan
2004	Stella Lubayelea Obasanjo	Nigeria
2005	Queen Rania Al-Abdullah	Jordan
2006	Rafic Hariri Foundation	Lebanon
2006	Aminath Jameel	Maldives
2007	Bill & Melinda Gates Foundation	USA
2008	Children's Cancer Hospital	Egypt
2009	Integrated Perinatal Care Project, KK Women's and Children's Hospital	Singapore
2009	Georgian Respiratory Association	Georgia
2010	National Center for Diabetes, Endocrinology and Genetics	Jordan
2010	Early Childhood Intervention Programme	Portugal
2011	Aged Care Maldives	Maldives
2011	Association Tchadienne Communauté pour le Progrés	Chad
2012	Chen Bowen	China
2012	Renal Disease Control Program (REDCOP)	Philippines
2013	Laila Ali Akbar Bastaki	Kuwait
2014	Institute for Research in Health (INISA)	Costa Rica
2015	“Akogo?” Foundation	Poland
2016	Palize Mehmett	China
2017	Lô Boubou Baïdy	Mauritania
2018	The Korea Institute of Drug Safety and Risk Management (KIDS)	South Korea
2019	The National Center for Global Health and Medicine	Japan
2019	Askwar Hilonga	Tanzania
2020	Xi Jin	China
2022	National Malaria Component	Nicaragua
2023	Maria Asuncion Silvestre	Philippines
2024	National Death Registry System	Saudi Arabia
