= Panchanan Mitra =

Indian professor of anthropology

Panchanan Mitra পঞ্চানন মিত্র
- Born: 25 May 1892; Kolkata, Bengal, British India
- Died: 25 July 1936 (aged 44); Kolkata, Bengal, British India
- Education: Anthropologist
- Known for: Anthropology
- Spouse: Nirmala

Panchanan Mitra (Bengali: পঞ্চানন মিত্র) (25 May 1892 – 25 July 1936) was an Indian professor of anthropology. He was succeeded by Sarat Chandra Mitra(1863-1938) and B.S.Guha(1894-1961). He was among the first Indians to study at Yale University and conducted several anthropological expeditions in India and abroad. He was the head of the Department of Anthropology of the University of Calcutta and is most known for his works Prehistoric India (1923), History of Ameri-can Anthropology (1930) and Indo-Poly-nesian Memories (1933). He was awarded the Fellowship of the Royal Anthropological Institute of Great Britain and Ireland and today the Asiatic Society awards an annual 'Panchanan Mitra Memorial Lectureship' for outstanding contributions to anthropology.

== Personal life and family ==
He was born to a well-known Bengali Kayastha family at Soora, an eastern suburb of Kolkata, India on 24 May 1892. The Mitra family was one of the oldest families of Bengal and received various honours from the Bengal Nawab. Raja Pitambar Mitra migrated to Oudh after the disaster at Palashi, and the family was settled there for many generations. When the family was under Ajodhyaram they received many honors from the Nawab Vizir of Oudh and the emperor at Delhi as well. Many members of the Mitra family were well known in literary circles. Pitambar and his grandson, Janmejay Mitra wrote Brajabuli poems. Janmejay was an Urdu poet of distinguished standing as well. Dr. Mitra's 1892. His grandfather's elder brother was Rajendralal Mitra was the first Indian President of The Asiatic Society and one of the pioneers of the Indian Renaissance. Rajendralal was the third son of Janmejay Mitra. Mitra died on 25 July 1936.

== Career ==
He was the first Professor of Anthropology at the University of Calcutta, and received the "Bishop Museum Fellowship" in 1924 for studying "Polynesian affinities with India". Panchanan Mitra was the first Indian to obtain a PhD from Yale University, USA in the year 1930. At Yale, he worked under the supervision of Clark Wissler. Mitra undertook and supervised several pioneering anthropological expeditions in India and abroad. Several of his students became notable. Nirmal Kumar Bose, personal secretary of Mahatma Gandhi during the Noakhali pre-partition riots was his student.

== Awards and memberships ==
He was awarded several medals and fellowships during his lifetime and was a member of several professional bodies. He was awarded the Fellowship of the Royal Anthropological Institute of Great Britain and Ireland. He was appointed as the Assistant Curator of the Archaeology section of the Indian Museum. He was the Honorary Magistrate of Kolkata from 1922 to 1924 and later served as a councillor in the Municipal corporation of the city till 1927. He presided over the Anthropology proceedings in the Indian Science Congress in 1933 and the anthropogenetics sessions of the Indian Population Congress, Lucknow in 1936. He was also an associate member at the American Museum of Natural History. The Asiatic Society awards an annual 'Panchanan Mitra Memorial Lectureship' for outstanding contributions to the field of anthropology in his name.

== Legacy ==
The recent (2005) publication of his book entitled Manual of Prehistoric India shows the continuing importance of his work. Although his contributions included much outside the realm of anthropology, probably his greatest legacy is the introduction and development of anthropology as an academic discipline in India. Presently, anthropology and its related sub-disciplines are taught in more than 40 Indian universities.

== Bibliography ==
- 1923 A History of American Anthropology, University of Calcutta. 1933(PDF)
- 1927 Prehistoric India: Its place in the World's Cultures
- 1933 Indo-Polynesian Memories
- A Manual of Prehistoric India

== See also ==
- Rajendralal Mitra
- Biraja Sankar Guha
