= Man in India =

Academic journal in anthropology

- Discipline: Anthropology, archaeology, linguistics and folk-culture
- Language: English

Publication details
- History: 1921–present
- Publisher: Serials Publications Pvt. Ltd. (India)
- Frequency: Quarterly

Standard abbreviations
- ISO 4: Man India

Indexing
- ISSN: 0025-1569
- OCLC no.: 561633210

Links
- Journal homepage

Man in India is an academic journal in anthropology with a focus on South Asia. The scope of the publication includes biological and sociocultural anthropology, archaeology, linguistics, and folk culture. It is currently published by Serials Publications Pvt. Ltd. India.

== History ==
Man in India was first published in 1921 by Sarat Chandra Roy as the first anthropological journal in India.

Sumahan Bandyopadhyay is the current editor of the journal. Previous editors include Verrier Elwin and Nirmal Kumar Bose.
