= Sirrun Hithaa Kulhelaafa =

Maldivian web series

- Opening sequence
- Story by: Azif Abdul Raheem
- Directed by: Ahmed Nimal
- Music by: Ayyuman Shareef
- Country of origin: Maldives
- Original language: Divehi
- No. of seasons: 1
- No. of episodes: 10

Production
- Producer: Ahmed Latheef
- Cinematography: Shivaz Abdulla
- Editors: Ahmed Latheef; Ahmed Asim
- Production company: Actional Movie Productions

Original release
- Release: 2010

Sirrun Hithaa Kulhelaafa is a Maldivian family drama television series written by Azif Abdul Raheem and directed by Ahmed Nimal. It stars Ahmed Latheef, Aminath Ameela, Mariyam Shakeela and Amira Ismail in main roles. The series revolves around three family members: ill-mannered younger sibling, educated and polite older sibling, and their guardian aunt and how a cunning man, plots to exploit their vulnerabilities for personal gain, but his schemes unravel as the family uncovers his deceitful intentions, leading to a climactic confrontation that strengthens their bond.

== Cast and characters ==
=== Main ===
- Ahmed Latheef as Hassan
- Aminath Ameela as Shuhudha
- Mariyam Shakeela as Faruhana
- Amira Ismail as Shaahzaada

=== Recurring ===
- Abdulla Saeed as Nihad
- Ibrahim Riyaz as Alim
- Adam Jinah as Fahudh

=== Guest ===
- Mohamed Rafee as Doctor (Episode 2)

== Episodes ==
No.	Title	Directed by
1	"Episode 1"	Ahmed Nimal
Faruhana (Mariyam Shakeela), an ambitious businesswoman takes care of her two nieces, the youngest one, Shuhudha (Aminath Ameela) a short tempered and ill-mannered girl, and Shaahzaada (Amira Ismail), the polite and well-mannered sibling. While Shaahzaada dedicates all her time to studying, Shuhudha spends most of time chatting. In the midst of this, a cunning man named Hassan (Ahmed Latheef) attempts to lure Shuhudha into a scheme for wealth and prosperity.
2	"Episode 2"	Ahmed Nimal
As a result of exhaustive nights dedicated to studying, Shaahzaada falls ill, prompting Faruhana to suggest that she prioritize self-care. Meanwhile, Shuhudha consistently reacts unfavorably to Faruhana's guidance. Hassan's initial approach towards Shuhudha is met with humiliation and rejection. However, over time, he manages to gradually build a closer connection with her.
3	"Episode 3"	Ahmed Nimal
Shuhudha ultimately agrees to meet Hassan who proposes to her on their first date—an offer she eventually agrees to. Shaahzaada tries to attempts to persuade Shuhudha to contemplate the potential ramifications of her connection with Hassan. Meanwhile, Hassan applies for a job opening within Faruhana's workplace. Faruhana is concerned about Shuhudha's conflicts with her and Shaahzada.
4	"Episode 4"	Ahmed Nimal
Hassan secures the newly offered position at Faruhana's company and garners her admiration through his unwavering dedication and commitment to his work. While Shaahzaada suggests to Faruhana the idea of marriage, Faruhana ultimately decides to place her family's needs at the forefront. Amid a heated disagreement, Shuhudha directs accusations at Faruhana regarding the mishandling of their father's wealth, an allegation that Shaahzaada finds difficult to accept. Shaahzaada is presented with an opportunity for further education. Unaware of their individual connections to Shuhudha, they subtly begin expressing their shared emotions.
5	"Episode 5"	Ahmed Nimal
Shuhudha begins smoking, a habit that proves challenging for Hassan to come to terms with. Despite both Faruhana and Shaahzada imploring her to quit, she persists in her voluntary continuation of the habit. As her examinations draw to a close, Shuhudha appeals to Hassan to expedite their marriage plans.
6	"Episode 6"	Ahmed Nimal
Hassan arranges a romantic dinner date for Faruhana and uses the opportunity to propose to her. Later that night, Faruhana confesses her reciprocal feelings, yet acknowledges their age disparity as an obstacle. Faruhana, is distracted from her family problems and relishes the initial stages of their relationship. Ultimately, Faruhana and Hassan tie the knot. The narrative takes an unforeseen twist when Faruhana introduces Hassan as her husband to her family.
7	"Episode 7"	Ahmed Nimal
Hassan extends his apologies to Shuhudha and successfully persuades her that their relationship will be advantageous for her due to his connection with Faruhana. He openly acknowledges his lack of knowledge about Shuhudha's familial relationship with Faruhana. Reconciled, Shuhudha and Hassan clandestinely rekindle their relationship, discreetly maintaining it without Faruhana's awareness.
8	"Episode 8"	Ahmed Nimal
Subsequently, it comes to light that Faruhana is the stepmother of Shuhudha and Shaahzaada, a revelation that intensifies the existing distance in their relationship. Hassan envisions himself as the eventual beneficiary of the family's wealth. Shuhudha entreats Hassan to divorce Faruhana and marry her instead, to which Hassan acquiesces, indicating his willingness to contemplate this proposition.
9	"Episode 9"	Ahmed Nimal
Shaahzaada discloses a startling revelation, recounting her observations of Hassan and Shuhudha's closeness. Alarmed, Faruhana pledges to be more vigilant moving forward. However, the subsequent night, a shocking truth unravels as Faruhana witnesses Hassan engaging in an extramarital affair with Shuhudha. In his defense, Hassan implores Faruhana to refrain from making hasty decisions. Meanwhile, Hassan's friend, Nihad, seeks a private meeting with Shaahzaada.
10	"Episode 10"	Ahmed Nimal
Nihad entrusts Shaahzaada with Hassan's scheme to divorce Faruhana and wed Shuhudha, with the sinister agenda of seizing the family's property and wealth. Hassan executes the planned divorce from Faruhana but asserts his intention to return to their abode. However, when Shaahzaada unveils a recording capturing Hassan's malevolent intentions, Shuhudha's stance shifts. Filled with fury, Shuhudha severs ties with Hassan, leaving him isolated and empty-handed.

== Soundtrack ==
Track listing
No.	Title	Music	Singer(s)	Length
1.	"Sirrun Hithaa Kulhelaafa"	Ayyuman Shareef	Shifa Thaufeeq

== Release and reception ==
The first episode of the series was released in 2010. Upon release the series met with mixed reviews from critics with particular criticism being pointed to its melodrama.
