= Kalaa Dheke Varah Loabivey =

- Written by: Shifa; Mohamed Manik
- Directed by: Mohamed Manik
- Music by: Ibrahim Nifar
- Country of origin: Maldives
- Original language: Dhivehi
- No. of seasons: 1
- No. of episodes: 12

Production
- Cinematography: Ali Rasheed; Hassan Haleem
- Editor: Ahmed Mohamed
- Production company: Apollo Entertainment

Original release
- Release: 2007

Kalaa Dheke Varah Loabivey is a Maldivian television series developed for Television Maldives by Mohamed Manik. The series stars Manik, Sheela Najeeb, Ibrahim Jihad and Aminath Ameela in main roles. The series follows two best friends who gets attracted to an outsider who visits their island for Eid holiday and what ensues in a game of love and defeat. It marks the directorial debut of Manik in a television series.

== Cast ==
=== Main ===
- Mohamed Manik as Fazeel
- Sheela Najeeb as Nadha
- Ibrahim Jihad as Nihan
- Aminath Ameela as Yumna

=== Recurring ===
- Mohamed Shiyam
- Ismail Shimal
- Mohamed Raqib
- Muawiyath Idhurees
- Mohamed Yamaan
- Mohamed Ahulam
- Ahmed Riyaz
- Shujau
- Nasreena Ali Firaq
- Shaanee
- Sobira
- Zakiyya
- Shifana
- Haleema
- Majeedha
- Majudha

== Episodes ==
No.	Title	Directed by
1	"Episode 1"	Mohamed Manik
Fazeel (Mohamed Manik) returns to his island, Dh. Kudahuvadhoo from Male' for Eid al-Adha and is instantly caught the attention of Yumna (Aminath Ameela) who confesses her feelings and affection without any hesitation. Even though hesitated by her best friend, Nadha (Sheela Najeeb), Yumna starts following him while making desperate moves. However, things does not go as her plan, when Fazeel becomes slowly attracted to Nadha.
2	"Episode 2"	Mohamed Manik
On the day of Eid al-Adha, Fazeel advocates his younger sister to pay attention in life and her surroundings while Yumna declares that nothing in the world can eradicate her trust and confidence in Nadha. Yumna quickly bonds with his family members, hoping to be noticed by him. During the celebrations, Yumna splashes color on him and he throws her into the sea as a light revenge.
3	"Episode 3"	Mohamed Manik
Fazeel's best friend, Nihan, throws shades at Yumna for her new friendship with Fazeel's younger sister, Shuha. Nadha performs a traditional dance at the Eid show which catches the attention of Fazeel, while Yumna remains smitten by him and is distracted from her surroundings by his presence. Despite her obvious moves, Yumna is disturbed when Fazeel praises Nadha.
4	"Episode 4"	Mohamed Manik
Nadha gets ready for Eid show when her hot-headed uncle, Amjad lectures her on discipline and modesty. Nadha and Yumna attend the Eid show and the former performs a traditional dance with Fazeel, which upsets Yumna. While they were on their way home, Amjad dragged her into the house and forbids her from talking to men. Concerned, Fazeel visits Nadha the next morning, further escalating the situation with her uncle.
5	"Episode 5"	Mohamed Manik
Yumna consoles a humiliated Nadha. Nihan pays a visit to Nadha's place requesting to arrange a meeting with Yumna, which further triggers Amjad. Fazeel witness Yumna together with Nihan and realizes, Nihan has been romantically involved with Yumna all along.
6	"Episode 6"	Mohamed Manik
Fazeel confronts Nihan regarding his affair with Yumna. Fazeel keeps thinking about Nadha, while she shares similar feelings towards him. Yumna is disturbed to see Nadha and Faazeel together.
7	"Episode 7"	Mohamed Manik
As the men goes on fishing, the women prepares the sauce to barbeque the fishes. Yumna keeps on teasing Nadha about her secret affection towards Fazeel, while the rest teases Yumna for losing to her best friend. Nihan confronts Yumna for her rapid change in behavior after Fazeel's entry into their lives. Meanwhile, Nadha's uncle impatiently waits for her return. Fazeel proposes to Nadha and she ultimately accepts his proposal.
8	"Episode 8"	Mohamed Manik
The episode recaps the whole incident from Fazeel and Nadha’s first encounter to the beginning of their romantic relationship. Their love story spreads like wildfire in the island. Yumna is disgusted how distanced Nadha currently is while Fazeel’s mother, Shafeega outright disapproves his relationship with Nadha.
9	"Episode 9"	Mohamed Manik
It was later revealed that her rejection was a joke and Shafeega highly approve their relationship. However, Nadha is anxious how her uncle would react to the news. Tensions builds between Nadha and Yumna. Fazeel gets selected for a position at Island Office.
10	"Episode 10"	Mohamed Manik
Yumna and Nadha clears their misunderstanding and gets back together while Yumna declares her change of intention for Fazeel and her new found affection towards Nihan. Meanwhile, Yumna's father, Hamid insists on marrying off his daughter to a well-educate man like Fazeel rather than Nihan. Hamid has a word with Shafeega regarding his intention to which Shafeega rebukes him for prioritizing own need in front of his daughter's preference. Amjad hears the rumor of Nadha and Fazeel's relationship and forbids her from meeting him.
11	"Episode 11"	Mohamed Manik
Nihan decides to apply for a vacant job at island pre-school much to Yumna's happiness. Fazeel is determined to face Amjad if it is what it takes to save their relationship. The same night, Fazeel takes his first step as Amjad tried to humiliate him in front of Nadha and ultimately accepts their relationship. Witnessing Nihan's love for Nadha, Hameed assured him that he is ready to welcome Nihan as his son-in-law, once he is settled and financially stable. Fazeel and Nadha gets married with a colorful celebration. Almost an year later, Nadha gives birth to a baby daughter.
12	"Episode 12"	Mohamed Manik
Nadha and Fazeel continue their romance and live their best lives together with their daughter, Maahee. Meanwhile, Yumna is pregnant to her first child. Nihan and Fazeel along with their friends go to night fishing. Soon after, one of the friends, Ali Shah rushes to Atoll House, informing the island chief that their fishing boat was capsized and he was the only survivor among the friends.

== Soundtrack ==
Track listing
No.	Title	Lyrics	Singer(s)	Length
1.	"Kalaa Dheke Varah Loabivey"	Mohamed Abdul Ghanee	Mohamed Abdul Ghanee

== Response ==
Upon release, the series received mainly positive reviews from critics and audience, where the writing, direction and performance of the actors were highlighted.
