= Sacred complex =

The concept of Sacred Complex was proposed by L. P. Vidyarthi under the influence of Robert Redfield. The aspects of great and little tradition as put up by Redfield were applied to an Indian context. The crux of the concept was to identify the mechanism of cultural complexions in an ancient Indian setting and studying the secondary complexions based on religious centres of India. L. P. Vidyarthi defined the complex in "Sacred complex of Hindu Gaya," as "a happy synthesis of sacred geography, sacred practices and sacred specialist of a Hindu place of pilgrimage, reflecting a level of continuity, compromise, and a combination between the great and little tradition." Later a number of studies were taken by different Indian Scholars in different Sacred Geographies in India as well as outside India. In which, Professor Makhan Jha stands first who studied many pilgrimage center applying "Sacred Complex" as a methodology to understand the trichotomy of the elements of Sacred Complex. After five decades to the concept prouponded by Prof. Vidyarthi, A restudy was done by Dr. Karuna Shanker Pandey in Hindu Gaya for his doctoral Degree in 2015.
