= Biraja Sankar Guha =

Indian physical anthropologist

Biraja Sankar Guha বিরজাশঙ্কর গুহ
- Born: 15 August 1894; Shillong, Assam, British India
- Died: 20 October 1961 (aged 67); Ghatshila, Bihar, India
- Education: University of Calcutta; Harvard University
- Occupation: Anthropologist

Biraja Sankar Guha (Bengali: বিরজাশঙ্কর গুহ) (15 August 1894 – 20 October 1961) was an Indian physical anthropologist, who classified Indian people into races around the early part of the 20th century and he was also a pioneer to popularize his scientific ideas in the vernacular. He was the first Director of the Anthropological Survey of India (ASI) (1945–1954).

== Career ==
B. S. Guha did his graduation in philosophy from the Scottish Church College and earned his post-graduate degree (also in philosophy) from the University of Calcutta. He worked as a research scholar in anthropology in the Government of Bengal in 1917. In 1920, he received the A.M. degree in anthropology from Harvard University, with distinction, and became the Hemenway Fellow of the university. During 1922–1924 he worked as a research scholar at the Harvard Museum of Natural History (Boston), American Museum of Natural History (New York), and the Bureau of Ethnicity of the Smithsonian Institution in Washington D.C. In 1924, he was awarded a Ph.D. degree in anthropology from Harvard University, for his thesis on "The Racial basis of the Caste System in India" (which he defended before Roland Dixon and Earnest Hooton). In the process he became one of the earliest recipients of the doctorate in that discipline in the world and certainly, the first Indian citizen to do so.

In 1927, he joined the anthropological section of the Zoological Survey of India.

In 1934, Guha became a Fellow of the Royal Anthropological Institute of Great Britain and Ireland, and member of the Permanent Council of the International Congress of Anthropology. In 1936, he founded the Indian Anthropological Institute in Calcutta (now Kolkata). In 1938, he became the President of the Anthropology Section of the British Association for the Advancement of Science.

In 1944, he submitted a new proposal for a separate Anthropological Survey of India. His proposal was supported by Nelson Annandale (the first director of the newly founded Zoological Survey of India) and Robert Beresford Seymour Sewell (1880–1964), Annandale's successor. In September 1945, zoology was moved under the Department of Agriculture, and a separate Anthropological Survey of India was set up under the Department of Education. The Survey came into being on 1 December 1945 with Guha in charge, first as "Officer on Special Duty" and later as Director (from August 1946 to 1954).Verrier Elwin was appointed as the first deputy director of the Anthropological Survey of India.

In 1955, Guha became the Director of Social Education Training Centre in Ranchi. During 1956–1959, he served as the Director of Bihar Tribal Research Institute, Ranchi.

Guha died in a railway accident at Ghatshila, Bihar.

== Work ==
Guha is best known for his work on classification of the Indian people into racial groups. Although the concept of race has been rejected by the evolutionary scientists, Guha's theories are of historical interest. In the later part of his life Guha, however strongly opined that purity of race is a myth and mixture of human populations is the reality. So, nations built up on the basis of so-called 'race' is also a myth. Human civilisation is a product of admixture and it is better to reserve the use of the term race in the exclusive biological domain

Apart from Indian tribes, he also did some research on North American Indians.

As anthropologist Kelli M. Kobor of the George Mason University observed in The Transfer of Anthropological Power in India: The Life and Work of Biraja Sankar Guha (1894–1961):

Although he is largely forgotten today, B. S. Guha ranks among the most prominent South Asian anthropologists of this century and served as the founder-Director of the Anthropological Survey of India. ...First, Guha's diverse training and professional experience—his undergraduate degree was from the University of Calcutta, his Ph.D. from Harvard, with fieldwork in both South Asia and the U.S.—belies the stereotype of colonial-era anthropologists as intellectually dependent on European models. The ease with which he shifted his focus from Indian tribals to North American "Indian tribes" highlights the integral links already extant between European, North American, and Asian intellectual communities early in this century. Second, Guha's work demonstrates the global dimensions of race theory, which is generally viewed as a local or regional phenomenon. Not only was India integral to the international project of identifying and classifying the numerous "races" of humankind, but Indian anthropologists like Guha were enthusiastic participants in it (even after that project's association with political repression and mass murder made it unpopular elsewhere). Finally, [Guha's work may be examined] in light of its contribution to a specifically South Asian dialogue about race and nationality.

Guha had a holistic view of anthropology and accordingly he shaped the Anthropological Survey of India by giving importance to all the sub-fields of anthropology. B.S. Guha was the first anthropologist in India who led a thoroughgoing field survey by a multidisciplinary team on the social tensions among the refugees of the then East Pakistan for suggesting the government about how to understand their problem and improve their living conditions. He was interested in writing the history of anthropology in India in which he gave due importance to social and cultural anthropology. Guha also wrote on social anthropological and sociological topics like material culture, youth dormitories, place of aborigines in national life, culture contact, tribal welfare and administration and role of social sciences in nation building.

=== Publications ===
- Racial elements in the population (1944), published by Oxford University Press (a digitised version is available from University of Oklahoma)
- The racial affinities of the people of India in Census of India, 1931 (1935), Government of India Press, Simla
- A biometric study on the tribes of north-western Himalayan region (with S. K. Mazumdar)
- A report on the human relics recovered by the Naga Hills (Burma) Expedition for the abolition of human sacrifice during 1926-1927 (Anthropological bulletins, the Zoological Survey of India; bulletin)
- Moshup legape doying agom lunen; or, the Mythological origin of the Abor dormitory system
- Studies in social tensions among the refugees from Eastern Pakistan
- An archaeological tour in Gedrosia
- The anthropological basis of P.W. Schmidt's Austrisch theory

== See also ==
- Racial groups of India
- Sarat Chandra Roy
- Panchanan Mitra
