= Vaudhey Mee =

Maldivian television series

- Screenplay by: Abdul Faththaah (Episode 1-8); Mahdi Ahmed (Episode 9-13)
- Directed by: Abdul Faththaah
- Music by: Ibrahim Nifar
- Country of origin: Maldives
- Original language: Divehi
- No. of seasons: 1
- No. of episodes: 13

Production
- Producer: Ahmed Shakeeb
- Cinematography: Ibrahim Moosa
- Editors: Abdul Faththaah; Mohamed Rasheed
- Production companies: Red Production; Movie Maldives

Original release
- Release: August 3 – October 26, 2013

Vaudhey Mee (transl. This is a promise) is Maldivian romantic drama television series co-written and directed by Abdul Faththaah. It stars Aishath Rishmy, Mohamed Manik, Aminath Ameela, Ahmed Nimal, Ahmed Saeed and Zeenath Abbas in main roles. The pilot episode of the series was released on 3 August 2013.

Film production began in late 2012. The first eight episodes of the series was written by director Abdul Faththaah, who later roped in screenwriter Mahdi Ahmed to complete the remaining five episodes.

== Cast and characters ==
=== Main ===
- Aishath Rishmy as Aishath Hana
- Aminath Ameela as Hudha
- Mohamed Manik as Fizam
- Ahmed Nimal as Shakir; Hana and Hudha's father
- Zeenath Abbas as Shaaira
- Ahmed Saeed as Qasim

=== Recurring ===
- Mariyam Haleem
- Mohamed Rasheed
- Mariyam Shahuza
- Mohamed Waheed as taxi driver

== Episodes ==
| No. in season | Title | Directed by | Original release date |
|---|---|---|---|
| 1 | "Episode 1" | Abdul Faththaah | August 3, 2013 |
Fizam (Mohamed Manik) returns Maldives after completing his teaching course from Malaysia and meets Hudha (Aminath Ameela), an outspoken young lady, with whom he has an impertinent encounter. Together they go to receive Hudha's sister, Aishath Hana (Aishath Rishmy), a soft spoken and polite woman, the exact opposite of Hudha.
| 2 | "Episode 2" | Abdul Faththaah | August 10, 2013 |
Upon their first meet, Hana has a soft spot for Fizam who is revealed to be the nephew of their guardian (Mariyam Haleem), while Hudha continues quarreling with Fizam. Hudha is frustrated with her regular taxi driver (Mohamed Waheed) who seems to be having a past relationship with her.
| 3 | "Episode 3" | Abdul Faththaah | August 17, 2013 |
Honoring her promise, Hudha goes to a restaurant with the taxi driver, who later gets accompanied by Fizam and Hana, much to the discomfort of Hudha. When Fizam queries Hudha if the taxi driver is her boyfriend, humiliated, she runs to home swearing not to face him ever again. Guilty of his action, and as a form of apology, he sends a bouquet of flowers to Hudha, who slowly becomes affectionate towards him.
| 4 | "Episode 4" | Abdul Faththaah | August 24, 2013 |
Once all the medical formalities were completed, Hana goes back to her island and continues taking care of her father, Shakir (Ahmed Nimal), who is diagnosed with lung cancer. Fizam and Hana bonds over late night calls while he spends most of the day time with Hudha.
| 5 | "Episode 5" | Abdul Faththaah | August 31, 2013 |
Hudha acknowledges having feelings towards Fizam. Few days later, Fizam goes back to his homeland to take his job as a school Principal and is pleased to meet Hana, while Hudha starts missing him.
| 6 | "Episode 6" | Abdul Faththaah | September 7, 2013 |
Fizam's exasperated and loquacious younger sister, Shaaira (Zeenath Abbas), has a distance relationship with her mother and is frustrated with the involvement of her brother in their family business, mainly managed by her cunning and old-fashioned husband, Qasim (Ahmed Saeed). Late night, Fizam eavesdrops Qasim talking romantically to another woman. Meanwhile, Fizam proposes to Hana which she accepts with pleasure.
| 7 | "Episode 7" | Abdul Faththaah | September 14, 2013 |
Hudha makes a surprise visit to her island and the three friends bond on several occasions. Shakir is revealed to have a conflict relationship with Qasim. Hudha confesses her feelings to Fizam, much to his confusion.
| 8 | "Episode 8" | Abdul Faththaah | September 21, 2013 |
Hana agrees to marry Fizam on one condition; they both shall stay at Hana's place after marriage citing the poor health condition of Shakir. Their marriage plans did not go well with Fizam's side of family due to their family's past relationship while the news of their wedding breaks Hudha's heart.
| 9 | "Episode 9" | Abdul Faththaah | September 28, 2013 |
Anguished, Hudha shows an outraged behavior which bemuses Hana. Qasim keeps bluffing narrations against Shakir's family to grow hatred towards them.
| 10 | "Episode 10" | Abdul Faththaah | October 5, 2013 |
Wedding preparations kick-off for Hana and Fizam's wedding while Hudha keeps her distance and Qasim continues mocking Shakir.
| 11 | "Episode 11" | Abdul Faththaah | October 12, 2013 |
Hudha makes an ally with Qasim and together they plan to ruin Hana and Fizam’s marriage.
| 12 | "Episode 12" | Abdul Faththaah | October 19, 2013 |
Hana discovers Hudha's affair with Qasim which causes a rift in their family. Shakir's unfortunate death causes additional sorrow and burden to Hana while Hudha keeps her guilt within her. Qasim takes the opportunity to further separate the siblings.
| 13 | "Episode 13" | Abdul Faththaah | October 26, 2013 |
Muaz, the husband of a woman who has been having an extramarital affair with Qasim, exposes his masterplan and devious goals to Shaaira and Hudha, which leads to an emotional reunion of the siblings.

== Soundtrack ==
Track listing
| No. | Title | Music | Singer(s) | Length |
|---|---|---|---|---|
| 1. | "Vaudhey Mee" | Ibrahim Nifar | Hassan Jalaal, Andhala Haleem |

== Release and reception ==
The first episode of the series was aired through Television Maldives on 3 August 2013, on the occasion of Ramadan 1434. Upon release, the series mainly received porisitive response for the direction and performance of the cast.
