= Aminath Ameela =

Maldivian actress

- Born: 12 December 1985 (age 40); S. Hithadhoo, Maldives
- Occupation: Actress
- Years active: 2006–2012

Aminath Ameela (born 12 December 1985) is a Maldivian film actress.

== Career ==
Ameela made her career debut with the erotic short film Kiss Jazbaath alongside Ali Seezan and Khadheeja Ibrahim Didi. The film was subject to several criticism for its bold display of erotic scenes. This was followed by several other short films including, Dr. Rocky (2007), Hiyy Ekaniveemaa (2007) and Handi Kujjaa (2007); where none of them helped her to receive the critical and commercial recognition.

In 2008, she appeared in a small role in Fathimath Nahula's romantic drama film, Yoosuf which depicts the story of a deaf and mute man (played by Yoosuf Shafeeu) who has been mistreated by a wealthy family, mocking his disability. Featuring an ensemble cast including Yoosuf Shafeeu, Niuma Mohamed, Sheela Najeeb, Ahmed Nimal, Fauziyya Hassan, Ravee Farooq, Zeenath Abbas and Ahmed Lais Asim, the film received widespread critical acclaim and attained blockbuster status at box office. The same year she featured in the short films, including the erotic thriller Guest House Room Number:201, comedy films No Money Full Beggy, Dhanthura and romantic films Umurah Salaam, Kushakaanulaa 1 and Maafukuraashey Kalaa. Apart from that, she also starred as Zeena, an unfortunate wife who loses her husband in a road accident, in Yoosuf Shafeeu and Fathimath Nahula's critically and commercially successful television series Soora.

The following year, she had only one release, a comedy short film, Dheulhi Ehnuvi Dhiulhi (2009). Ali Seezan's family drama Maafeh Neiy was released in 2010, where she appeared alongside Ali Seezan and Niuma Mohamed, where she played the role Rizna, a cruel daughter who mistreats her own mother. The film highlighting many social issues including human rights abuses, forced marriage and domestic violence was criticised for its melodrama. After two years, she starred in Ahmed Nimal's television mini-series Dhirumeh Nethas as a helpful friend followed by a supporting role in another drama series Vaudhey Mee (2012).

== Personal life ==
During her peak days in her career, Ameela married her co-star Ahmed Latheef, but the couple got divorced in 2011. On 4 July 2013, she married an army officer.

== Filmography ==
=== Feature film ===
Year	Title	Role	Notes	Ref(s)
2008	Yoosuf	School teacher	Special appearance	
2010	Maafeh Neiy	Rizna		
2013	Fathis Handhuvaruge Feshun 3D	Shafeega		

=== Short film ===
Year	Title	Role	Notes
2006	Kiss Jazbaath	Fathimath Ulfa Nazeer	
2006	Dr. Rocky	Raanee	
2007	Hiyy Ekaniveemaa	Ameela	
2007	Loabeegaa Dhon U	Herself	Special appearance in the song "Come On My Darling"
2007	Haa Shaviyani Rasgefaanu 4		
2007	Handi Kujjaa	Handi Kujjaa	
2008	Guest House Room Number:201	Aneesa	
2008	No Money Full Beggy	Ameela	
2008	Umurah Salaam	Wafa	
2008	Dhanthura	Sujiyya	
2008	Kushakaanulaa 1		
2008	Girlfriend	Reesha	
2009	Dheulhi Ehnuvi Dhiulhi	Julia	
2010	Maafu Kuraashey Kalaa	Nuha	

=== Television ===
Year	Title	Role	Notes
2007	Kalaa Dheke Varah Loabivey	Yumna	Main role; 12 episodes
2007–2008	Vimlaa	Reema	Recurring role
2008	Soora	Zeena	Main role; 5 Episodes
2008	Kushakaanulaa Shazaa Nudheyshey		Main role
2008	Asarugai...		Main role; 5 Episodes
2009	Vakinuvaan Bunefaa Vaudheh Nuvanhey?	Fazna	Main role; 13 episodes
2010	Sirrun Hithaa Kulhelaafa	Shuhudha	Main role; 10 episodes
2012	Dhirumeh Nethas	Noora	Recurring role; 5 Episodes
2013	Vaudhey Mee	Hudha	Main role; 13 episodes
