= Soora =

- Official film poster
- Directed by: Yoosuf Shafeeu; Fathimath Nahula
- Written by: Fathimath Nahula
- Screenplay by: Fathimath Nahula
- Produced by: Fathimath Nahula
- Starring: Ali Ahmed; Amira Ismail; Aminath Ameela
- Cinematography: Shivaz Abdulla
- Edited by: Yoosuf Shafeeu; Fathimath Nahula
- Production company: Crystal Entertainment
- Release date: 2008
- Country: Maldives
- Language: Dhivehi

Soora is a 2008 Maldivian drama film written and directed by Fathimath Nahula. Produced under Crystal Entertainment, the film stars Ali Ahmed, Amira Ismail and Aminath Ameela in pivotal roles.

== Premise ==
Riyaz and Niyaz (both roles played by Ali Ahmed) are two identical twins; Riyaz is happily married to Zeena (Aminath Ameela) while Niyaz is romantically attracted to Nashwa (Amira Ismail) who is being domestically abused by her drug addict husband, Shifan (Mahir). Niyaz was able to save Nashwa from her miserable life but the family met with an unfortunate incident when the cycle Riyaz and Niyaz were driving gets crashed in an accident ultimately killing the latter.

== Cast ==
- Ali Ahmed as Riyaz / Niyaz
- Amira Ismail as Nashwa
- Aminath Ameela as Zeena
- Arifa Ibrahim as Khadheeja
- Hamid Ali as Fuwad
- Aminath Shareef as Riyaz and Niyaz's mother
- Abdulla Mahir as Shifan
- Inayath as Aisha
- Yooshau Jameel as Huzam
- Haseena as Nashwa's mother
- Abdul Raheem
- Yoosuf Zuhuree
- Shiman

== Soundtrack ==
The film has only one song, titled "Soora" and also known as "Vakive Dhiyayas". Two versions of the song were released; a solo version by Ibrahim Zaid Ali and a duet version along with Mariyam Unoosha. The original melody and track was believed to break the norm in Nahula's films; inclusion of Bollywood unofficial remake songs.

Track listing
No.	Title	Lyrics	Music	Singer(s)	Length
1.	"Soora - Title Track"	Adam Haleem Adnan	Ibrahim Zaid Ali	Ibrahim Zaid Ali
