= Lohra (tribe) =

Community found in Jharkhand India

Regions with significant populations
- India
- Jharkhand: 216,226 (2011 Census)

Languages
- Nagpuri, Mundari, Panch parganiya

Religion
- Sarnaism

Related ethnic groups
- Lohra, Asur

Lohra is a artisan Tribal community found in Jharkhand. They are traditionally associated with works of iron smelting.

== History ==
Historians have no idea from which period the Lohra are residing in Chota-nagpur plateau. There is also no oral or folklore about the origin of Lohra.

The use of iron tool and pottery spread in the Chotanagpur region during 1400 to 800 BCE according to carbon dating of iron slag, sickle and wheel made pottery which was found in Barudih of Singhbhum district. According to carbon dating, Iron celt was dated to 1200 BCE.

== Distribution ==
They are mainly distributed in the state of Jharkhand in district of Ranchi, Simdega, Gumla, Lohardaga, Singhbhum, Hazaribagh, Palamu, Dhanbad, Bokaro, Giridih district. Their population in Jharkhand is 2,16,226.

== Subgroups ==
Loharas are divided into two subgroups i.e. Kanujia Lohra, who are migrants from Bihar, and the indigenous Kol Lohra or Nagpuria Lohra. The Nagpuria Lohra are further divided into two groups i.e. Sad Kamar and Lohra. Sad Kamar have abandoned their occupation and do farming. Sad Kamar still speaks Mundari and eats only fowl and goat.

Lohra follows very few restrictions on foods and eat carcasses of dead animals. Lohra are distributed all over South Bihar. The Sad Kamar live in the Pach Pargana area. The Lohra speak Sadri and Mundari.

== Culture ==
Their traditional occupation is smelting iron and making agricultural and household equipment of iron. They make sickle, axes, arrow heads and Plowshares. They speak Sadani or Nagpuri.

=== Clans ===
They have clans such as Sath, Nag, kachhap, Son (Son river), Magahia, Tutli, Kachhua (turtle), Dhan (rice), Tirkey (a bird) etc. In marriage, the bride price is prevalent. Their festivals are Sarhul, Karam, Sohrai, Fagua.

== Official Classification ==
Lohra are included in Scheduled Tribe in Bihar, Jharkhand and West Bengal.
