= Nirmal Kumar Bose =

Indian anthropologist (1901–1972)

- Born: 22 January 1901; Kolkata, Bengal Presidency, British India
- Died: 15 October 1972 (aged 71); Kolkata, West Bengal, India
- Occupations: Anthropologist, social worker

Nirmal Kumar Bose (22 January 1901 – 15 October 1972) was an Indian anthropologist, who played a formative role in "building an Indian Tradition in Anthropology". A humanist scholar with a range of interests, he was also a leading sociologist, urbanist, Gandhian, and educationist. Also active in the Indian freedom struggle with Mahatma Gandhi, he was imprisoned in 1931 during the Salt Satyagraha.

== Early life ==
He attended the Puri Zilla School, the Scottish Church College, and later the Presidency College, which was then affiliated with the University of Calcutta. He dropped out of the MSc program in geology as a gesture of solidarity with the Non-Cooperation Movement. Later he would earn an MSc degree in anthropology from the University of Calcutta.

== Career in anthropology ==
Bose was originally from Kolkata. His anthropological work was founded on extensive field work and had a pragmatic prescriptive basis, and was considered radical against the background of earlier descriptive work by British anthropologists. He wanted Indian intellectuals to work on Indian anthropology. According to Andre Beteille, Bose showed that the idea that one gets of Indian society by looking at classical texts and the idea that one gets of Indian society by conducting anthropological fieldwork in fact confirm each other; they confirm a picture of a particular kind of social structure. But Bose went on to argue that such a social structure was being dislocated from the middle of 19th century onwards as India became involved more and more in a world economic system, in larger political conflicts, etc.

His initial work was among the Juang of Orissa, as part of his master's work at Calcutta University (1924–25). In 1929, he brought out Cultural Anthropology, presenting a developing world view of anthropology and culture. 1932 saw the publication of Canons of Orissan architecture, announcing his interest in art and architecture. His sociological interests were reflected in Some aspects of caste in Bengal (1958), and his urbanist interests in Calcutta 1964: a social survey (1968) and Anthropology and some Indian problems (1972).

Among his major works is the study Peasant Life in India (1961), based on a wide study with data collected from 311 out of 322 districts of India. Here he comments on the considerable interpenetration in the material culture of rural India, "on the whole independent of language as well as of physical types". Other important works include The Structure of Indian Society (1949).

He was also the editor, from 1951 until his death, of the journal Man in India. He was the director of the Anthropological Survey of India from 1959 to 1964. In 1957–58, he visited the University of California, Berkeley and the University of Chicago. In 1965, he undertook a survey of the Hill districts of Assam and in the following year, the tribal regions of Arunachal Pradesh (then NEFA).

Over a long career during much of which he was also involved in political struggle and government offices, he "found time to write more than 700 articles and almost thirty books", writing in both Bengali and English, for the general public and a scholarly audience.

Prof Bose had also written an explanatory book on the Sun Temple of Konarak in Orissa, in Bengali, titled Konaraker Bibaran. This title was out of print for a long time until recently, when New Age Publishers Private Limited of Kolkata published a new edition, annotated by Prasenjit Dasgupta and Soumen Paul. The edited book was also reviewed. In this review other English works of Bose were cited along with his debate with Stella Kramrisch on the issue of Konark architecture.

In 1972 he was elected President of The Asiatic Society.

== Association and works on Mahatma Gandhi ==
Bose had been reading the works of Mahatma Gandhi since his college days, and his Selections from Gandhi (1934) remains a broad and useful anthology of Gandhi's work. Between 1934 and 1947, Bose started working closely with Gandhi, and served as his secretary in the mid-1940s. He developed a broad appreciation for his ideology, which is reflected in his analytical Studies in Gandhism (1940). This period is covered in his My Days with Gandhi (1953) which describes the last decade of Gandhi's life, particularly his courageous stance in personally moving into areas with fierce communal violence (Noakhali genocide 1947). Bose held Gandhi's philosophy in high esteem. The Indira Gandhi National Centre for the Arts has organised the N. K. Bose memorial lectures once every two years since 1993. Anthropologist Surajit Chandra Sinha has written a field biography: The Anthropology of Nirmal Kumar Bose (1970).
