= L. P. Vidyarthi =

Indian anthropologist (1931–1985)

Lalita Prasad Vidyarthi
- Born: 28 February 1931
- Died: 1 December 1985 (aged 54)
- Education: Lucknow University (M.A., 1953); University of Chicago (PhD)
- Occupation: Anthropologist
- Known for: Indian anthropologist

Lalita Prasad Vidyarthi (28 February 1931 – 1 December 1985) was an Indian anthropologist.

== Education ==
Vidyarthi holds a master’s degree in anthropology (1953) from Lucknow University, having studied under D. N. Majumdar. In 1958, he earned a Ph.D. from the University of Chicago under the supervision of Robert Redfield and McKim Marriott. His doctoral dissertation was titled The Sacred Complex of a Traditional City of Northern India.

== Career ==
He began his academic career as a Professor at Ranchi College (then affiliated with Bihar University), serving there from 1953 to 1956. He later joined Ranchi University as a Professor of Anthropology, teaching from 1958 to 1968, and became the head of the Anthropology Department in 1968, a position he held until he died in 1985.

== Death ==
Vidyarthi died on December 1, 1985.

== Works ==
Vidyarthi encouraged Indian social scientists to study scriptures like the Vedas, Upanishads, and Puranas to understand India's social and cultural realities. He emphasized the importance of Indian thinkers such as Sri Aurobindo, Swami Vivekananda, and Raja Ram Mohan Roy for their focus on spiritual humanism and universal love.

In 1951, he studied the Maler tribe, exploring their ecological practices and spiritual beliefs. He introduced the "Nature-Man-Spirit Complex," which highlights the interplay of nature, human activities, and spirituality. He also developed the concept of the Sacred Complex, analyzing sacred sites like Gaya through "sacred geography," "sacred performances," and "sacred specialists."

=== Books ===
- The Sacred Complex in Hindu Gaya, 1961
- The Maler: The Nature-Man-Spirit Complex in a Hill Tribe, 1963
- Art and Culture of North East India, 1986
- Leadership in India, 1967
- The Tribal Culture of India, 2000
- Rural Development in South Asia, 1982
