= Binjhia people =

Ethnic group found in Odisha and Jharkhand

Binjhia
Total population
- 25,823 (2011)

Regions with significant populations
- Odisha: 11,419
- Jharkhand: 14,404

Languages
- Binjhwari, Sadri, Odia

Religion
- Hinduism, Autonomous Tribal Religion

The Binjhia (also known as Binjhoa, Binjhawar) is an ethnic group found in Odisha and Jharkhand. The 2011 census showed their population to be around 25,835. They are classified as a Scheduled Tribe by the Indian government.

== Etymology ==
According to some sources the name Binjhia is derived from the word Vindhyas meaning Vindhya Hills.

== Origin ==
The Binjhias believe that their original home was Kolanagari in the Vindhya valley. From Vindhya hills they moved east-wards to Chhotnagpur, Keonjhar, Sundargarh and Barasombar. Long time ago they called themselves as Vindhyaniwasi. But after settling down at Chhotnagpur, gradually they were called as Binjhia by the local people.

== Subgroups ==
The Binjhia are divided into four subgroups. They are Asur-Binjhia, Agaria-Binjhia, Pahariya Binjhia and Dand-Binjhia. These subgroups are further divided into a number of septs.

== Culture ==
The Binjhia settlements are large and homogeneous. They do not practise clan exogamy. However consider each village as an exogamous unit. Adult marriage is preferred in some groups. Where as child marriage is common in others. They also allow cross-cousin marriage, levirate, sororate, remarriage of widows and divorcees. They practise both burial and burning of the dead. There are separate burial grounds reserved for different lineages.

They worship a number of benevolent and malevolent spirits along with Hindu gods and goddesses such as Jagannath. Their village deity is named Budharaja. They have the cult of ancestor worship – pitru puja at the clan and lineage levels. They still use barter system at the village community level and the weekly markets. Women are an important part in all forms of socio-economic transactions. The structure of clan starts at level of an extended family called dibiris. A cluster of dibiris comprising a local group of families up to three generations form a jama - a minor lineage. Several jamas in a village constitute a khumuri, a major lineage. The latter make a small clan, a barga. The clan is composed of bargas and headed by a gauntia.

== See also ==
- Tribes of India
