= Karmali tribe =

Scheduled Tribes of Jharkhand and West Bengal

Karmali
- Classification: Scheduled Tribe
- Religions: Folk Hinduism
- Languages: Khotta language
- Country: India
- Original state: Jharkhand, West Bengal, Assam

The Karmali is an artisan tribe of Jharkhand. It is composed of blacksmiths. They are mainly concentrated in Ramgarh, Bokaro, Hazaribagh, Giridih and Ranchi district of Jharkhand and sizable populations are also found in Aurangabad, Rohtas of Bihar; West Bengal and Assam. They speak Khotta language at home and Hindi language with society. As per 1981 census their population in the state was 38,651. They are considered as Scheduled Tribe in West Bengal and Jharkhand.
