= Kanwar (tribe) =

Tribe in India

Total population
- c. 947,000 (2011 census)

Regions with significant populations
- India
- Chhattisgarh: 887,477
- Maharashtra: 26,354
- Madhya Pradesh: 18,603
- Jharkhand: 8,145
- Odisha: 5,225
- Bihar: 868

Languages
- Chhattisgarhi • Sadri • Hindi

Religion
- Hinduism, Ethnic religion

Kanwar or Kawar is a tribal community found in central India, mainly in the state of Chhattisgarh, with significant populations in neighbouring areas of Maharashtra and Madhya Pradesh.

== History and origin ==
Kanwar believe that the term Kanwar is derived from Kaurava, the ruling clan in the Mahabharata and state that they are descendants of a Kaurava. According to Trivedi (1971), the term Kanwar appears to be a corruption of the word Kaurava and refers to trusted soldiers of the Haihaiyavanshi chiefs of Ratanpur. Hewitt (1869) considered them to be imperfect Rajputs who settled the hills of the Vindhya Range and failed to become Hindu like other war-like immigrants. Kanwar speak Chhattisgarhi and Sadri.

== Present circumstances ==
They are listed as a Scheduled Tribe in Bihar, Chhattisgarh, Jharkhand, Madhya Pradesh, Maharashtra and Odisha. They are widespread throughout Chhattisgarh excluding Bastar division, Gondiya and Gadchiroli districts of Maharashtra, and Shahdol district of Madhya Pradesh, as well as districts of Sindh and Punjab.

The Kanwar are landowning cultivators. As a secondary occupation they work as laborers. They select a person to head the community council of several villages. That leader is assisted by elderly members of the community, and his council looks after the social order of the community.

They worship many gods including Dulha deo, Bahan Deo, Thakur Deo, Shikar Deo and goddesses including Sagai Devi, Matin Devi, Banjari Devi etc.

Kanwar have eight endogamous division- Tanwar, Kamalbansi, Paikara, Dudh Kanwar, Rathia, Chanti, Cherwa and Rautia. Of these Cherwa, Rathia and Tanwar have been included in Schedule Tribe list. They are patrilineal, patriarchal and patrilocal. Kanwars have a large number of exogamous totemic septs which are named after plants and animals. Some totemic septs are Baghwa (tiger), Chita (leopard), Bilwa (wild cat), Bokar (goat), Bichhi (scorpion), Bhainsa (buffalo) and Sua (parrot). Other septs include Adila, Bhandari, Chandrama (moon), Chanwar (a whisk), Champa (plumeria flower), Chua(well), Daharia, Dhanguru, Dhenki (Pounding-lever), Darpan (a mirror), Fulbandhia, Gobra (dung beetle), Hudra (wolf), Kothi (a store-house), Khumri(A leaf- umbrella), Lodha(a wild dog), Gonga Cochar, Sanwami, Manjhi, Nahna, Samund, Kodia Dudh, Son Pakhar and Sikuta.

The proposal for a match comes from the boy's father rather than the girls. After selecting a suitable bride, the groom's family sends a party to the bride's family saying the groom would like to have a cup of pej (rice-water) from them. If the girl's family makes pej, the proposal is approved. During the betrothal ceremony, when the boy’s party go to the girl’s house with a present of bangles, clothes, and fried cakes of rice and Urad carried by a Kaurai Rawat. They also take suk, the bride-price, along with goats to be eaten during the wedding. For the marriage they put on special dress, which is passed down for generations. The marriage is done when the bride and groom walk together 6 times around a pole in the girl's house. Afterwards the parents of the girl wash the couple's feet with milk. They then go to the groom's house and repeat the same procedure there. On the following day the couple go and bathe in a tank, where each throws five pots of water over the other. And on their return the bridegroom shoots arrows at seven straw images of deer over his wife’s shoulder, and after each shot she puts a little sugar in his mouth. This is to indicate he will support his family through hunting. On the fourth day, the bride returns to her old home to play the game of Gauri with younger girls. After 3 months of this, she goes to her husband's house.
