= Asur people =

Austroasiatic ethnic group living primarily in the Indian state of Jharkhand

Asur
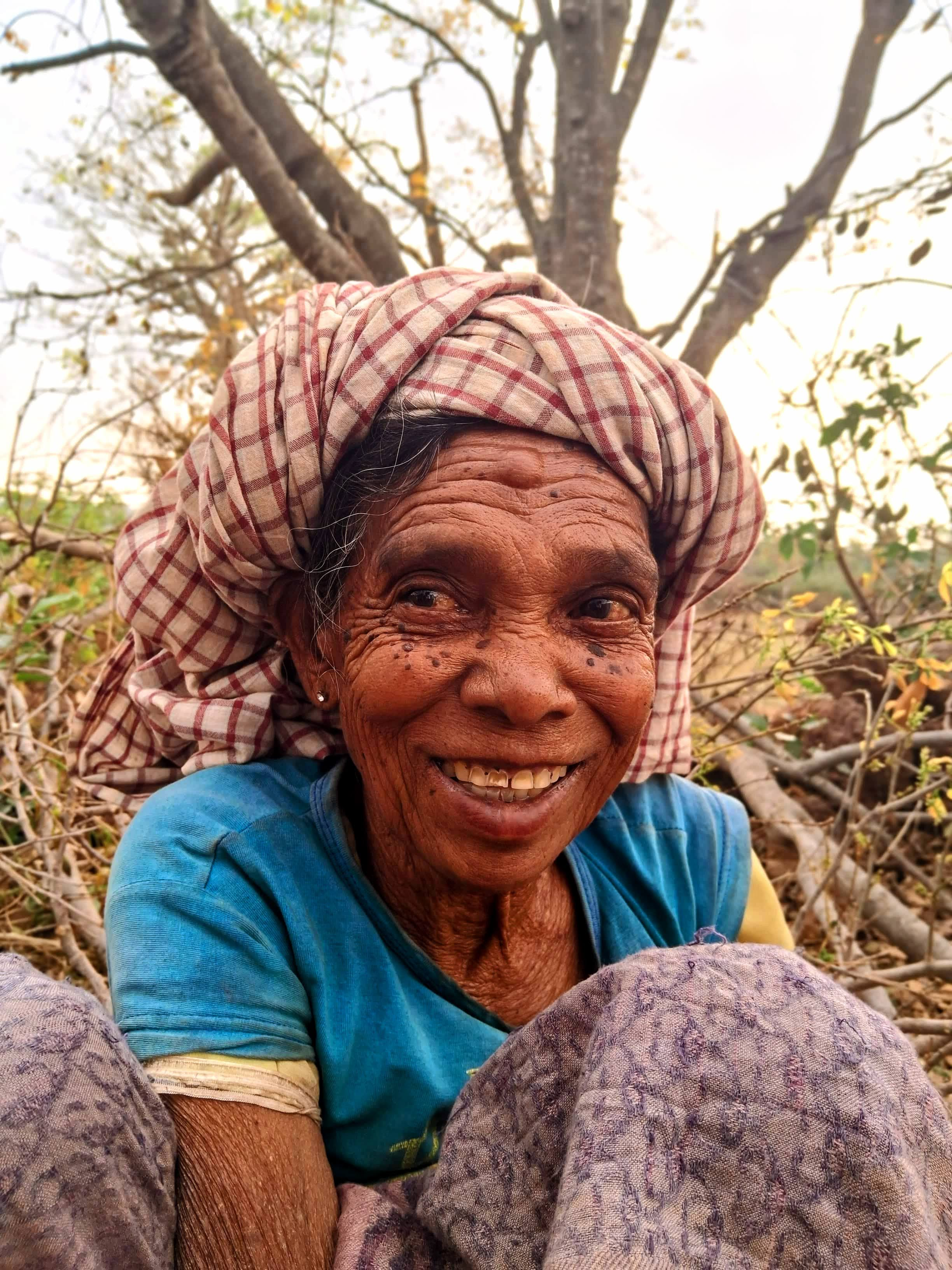

Total population
- c. 33,000 (2011 census)

Regions with significant populations
- Jharkhand: 28,735
- Bihar: 4,987

Languages
- Asur, Birija

Religion
- Traditional beliefs

Related ethnic groups
- Munda peoples

An Asur Sarhul song

The Asur people are a very small Austroasiatic ethnic group living primarily in the Indian state of Jharkhand, specifically within the Gumla, Lohardaga, Palamu, and Latehar districts. They speak Asur, a Munda language.

== Occupations ==
Asurs are traditionally iron-smelters. They were once hunter gatherers, having also involved in shifting agriculture. However, majority of them switched to agriculture, with 91.19 percent enlisted as cultivators in the 2011 census.

Their indigenous technology of iron smelting gives them a distinct identity; as they claim to have descended from the ancient Asuras who were associated with the art of metal craft. When smelting, the Asur women sing a song relating the furnace to an expectant mother encouraging the furnace to give a healthy baby, i.e., good quality and quantity of iron from the ore; and were thence, according to Bera, associated with the fertility cult. But nowadays a major section of the population is also attached with mining work.

== Society ==
Except in emergency cases, they use traditional herbal medicines. They have their own community council (jati panch) where disputes are settled. They accept food from Rajputs, Oraon, Kharwar, Thakur, Ghasi, and few others; and maintain putative kinship ties with the Kharwar, Munda and other neighbouring tribes. Except the burial site, they share all other public spaces with their neighbours. They live in pats (a clearing area) surrounded by the forest, and their houses are made of mud walls supported by wooden poles with a roof covered with paddy straw and self-baked khapras (tiles). Their houses consist of spaces for cattle and poultry and a separate area for worship of ancestors. Utensils for cooking and storing water drawn from wells, are made of iron, aluminium and earthen ware. Traditional male clothing is dhoti while the females wear tattoo marks (depicting totemic objects) upon their bodies as ornaments. The females also wear other metal and non-metal ornaments as well as glass bangles. They use common agricultural implements for cultivation; and occasionally hunt game in the forest using bows and arrows.

== Divisions ==
The modern Asur tribe is divided into three sub-tribal divisions, namely Bir (Kol) Asur, Birjia Asur and Agaria Asur. The Birjia are recognized as a separate schedule tribe.

They are further divided into 12 clans. These Asur clans are named after different animals, birds and food grains. Family is second prominent institution after the clan. The clans are Aind (Eel), Dhan (Rice), Lila (Deer), Suar (Pig), Bharewa (Wild dog), Kerketta (A kind of bird), Munjani (Anjun tree), Titio (A kind of bird), Beng (Frog), Khusar (A kind of bird), Non (Salt) and toppo (Wood pecker).

== Religion ==
The Asur religion is a mixture of animism, animatism, naturalism and ancestral worships. They also believe in black magic like bhut-pret (spirits) and witchcraft. Their chief deity is Singbonga. Amongst the other deities are Dharati Mata, Duari, Patdaraha and Turi Husid.

They celebrate festivals like Sarhul, Karma, Dhanbuni, Kadelta, Rajj karma, Dasahara Karam. Asurs believe the Mahishasura of the Durga Maa was their benevolent ancestor, and mourn during the Durga Puja period for what they see as the unjust butchering of their ancestor. The veneration of Mahishasura has spread throughout the Munda tribes of West Bengal as well as Namasudras.

An Asur Karma festival song

== Marriage ==
Marriage is a very important ritual and comes essentially in the life of every individual. Only the physically disabled are not able to get married. The Asur follow the rule of Monogamy, but in case of barrenness, widower and widow-hood, they follow the rule of Bigamy or even Polygamy. Widow remarriages are permissible. At the time of marriage, they follow the rule of Tribe Endogamy. Those who do not obey these rules are thrown out from the community but are allowed after paying seven times feast to the community members.

An Asur wedding song

== Challenges ==
Presently, the Asurs of Jharkhand are having many difficulties. They don't have access to proper basic amenities like health services, education, transportation, drinking water, etc. They are on the verge to become destitute because of the elimination of their traditional occupation iron-smelting. Their agricultural based economy is also in danger due to bauxite mining in the area. As a result, migration and displacement have become their major problems. There have been cases of human trafficking of the minor girls, poverty is a big reason behind it. These days a young Asur woman called Sushma Asur is striving hard to preserve art, culture and the existence of her community.
